= List of depictions of urine in art =

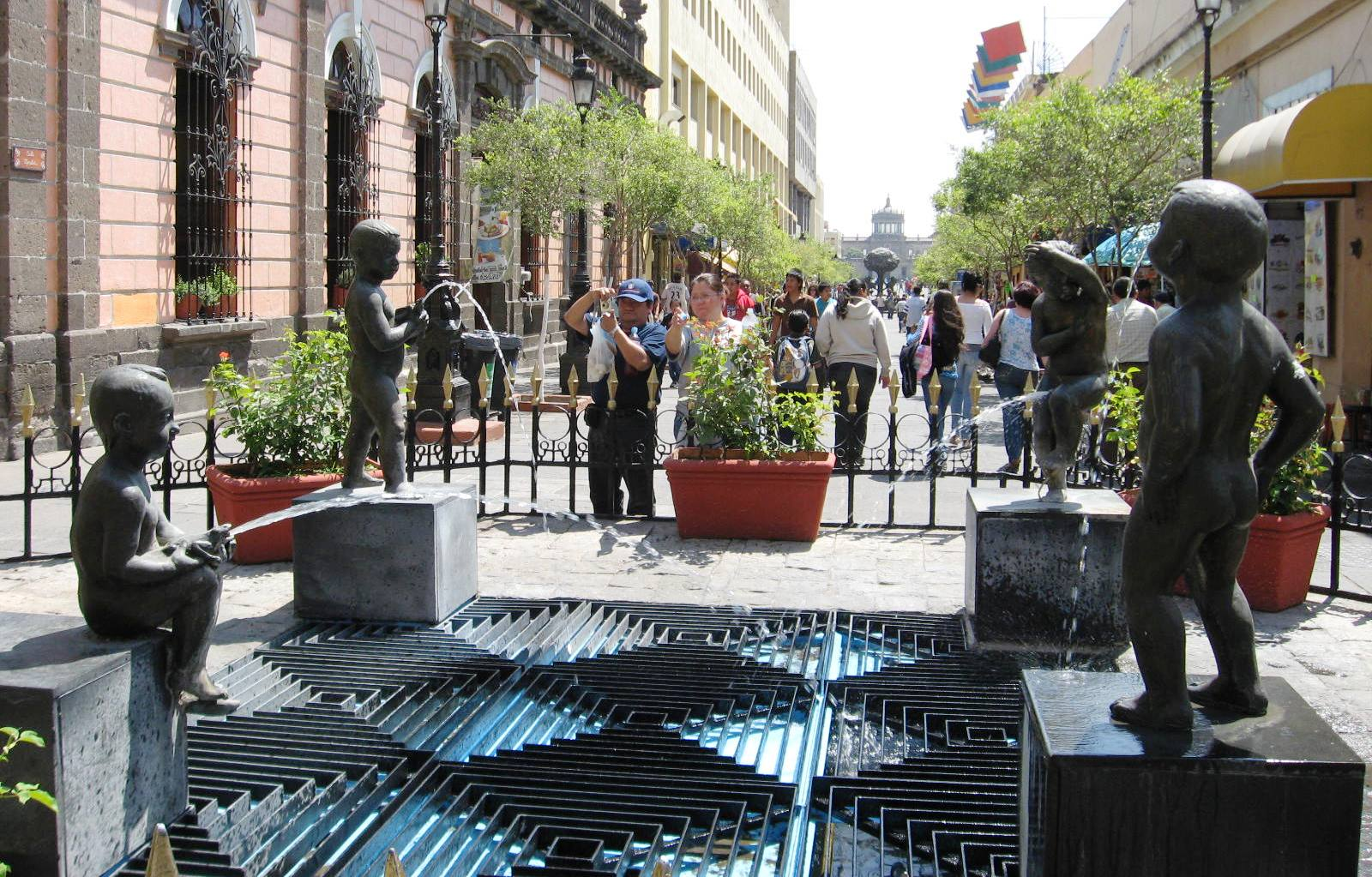
Fuente de los Niños Miones, Guadalajara, Jalisco, Mexico

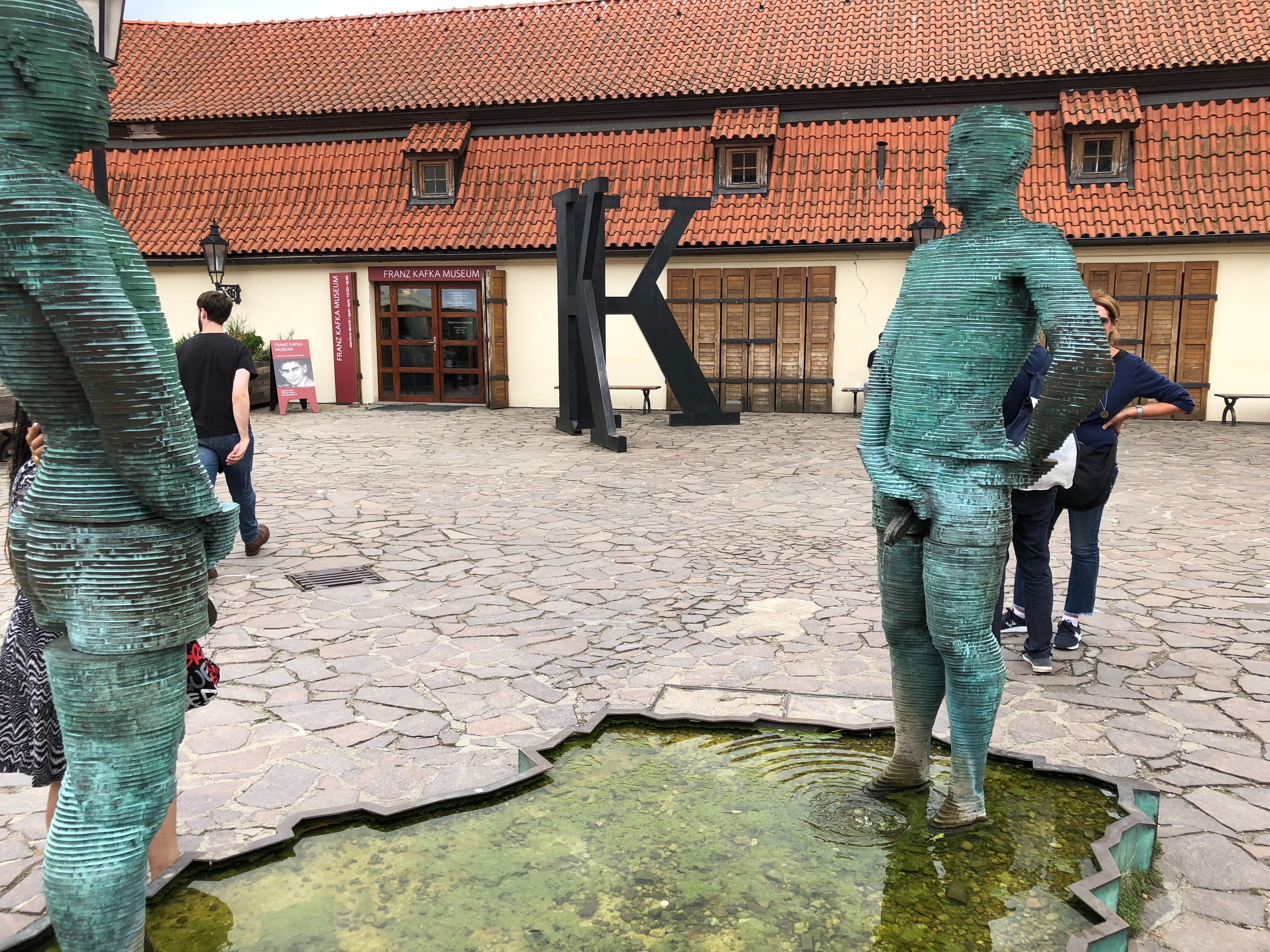
Piss, Prague, Czech Republic

The puer mingens 'urinating boy' is a common motif in art from classical antiquity to the present. Depictions of urine in art include:

- Bad Bad Boy, Helsinki, Finland by Tommi Toija
- Fideicommissum, Wanås, Sweden
- Fill That Seat
- Fountain of the Future
- Fuente de los Niños Miones, Guadalajara, Jalisco, Mexico
- Het Zinneke, Brussels, Belgium
- Jeanneke Pis, Brussels, Belgium
- Manneken Pis, Brussels, Belgium
  - There are replicas in Canada, Taiwan, and the United States.
- Maximilian's Fountain (also known as Roland's Fountain)
- The Peeing Boys (Alekseev), Kyiv, Ukraine
- Peeing Colors
- Piss (Černý), Prague, Czech Republic
- Pissing Pug
- Tisseren ("The Pee-er"), Copenhagen
- To Pee in Public or Private Spaces, Various
- Unity
- Venus and Cupid by Lorenzo Lotto, Metropolitan Museum of Art, New York City

The sculpture Petra has simulated urine. Piss Christ is a 1987 photograph by the American artist and photographer Andres Serrano.

== See also ==
- Body fluids in art
