= Franz Kafka Museum =

Museum in Prague

Coordinates: 50.088°N 14.410°E

Kafka Museum
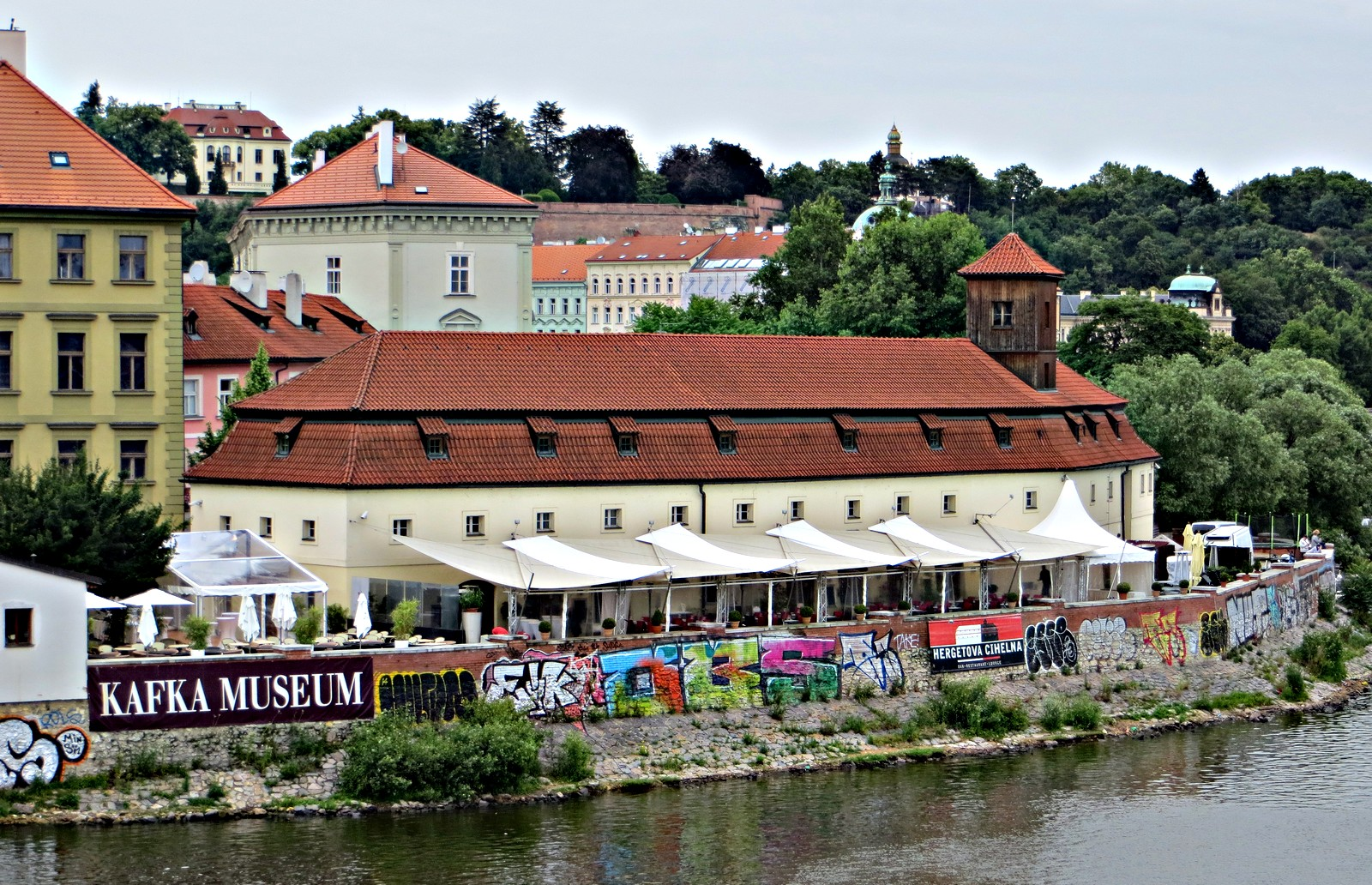
- The museum's exterior in 2015
- Established: 2005; 21 years ago
- Location: Prague, Czech Republic
- Website: Official website

The Franz Kafka Museum (Czech: Muzeum Franze Kafky) in Prague is dedicated to the author Franz Kafka. The museum hosts a number of first edition Kafka books.

== History ==
The exhibit now at the Franz Kafka Museum was first displayed in Barcelona in 1999 in a three-part exhibition exploring famous authors' relationships to their cities. The Kafka exhibit was called "The City of K.: Franz Kafka in Prague" and the two other exhibits explored James Joyce and Dublin and Fernando Pessoa and Lisbon. The Franz Kafka exhibition moved to New York City's Jewish Museum in 2002 before its permanent installment, which opened in the summer of 2005 in the Herget Brickworks building in the Malá Strana district of Prague.

== Exhibition ==
The exhibition features copies of manuscripts as well as photographs and personal documents, but no originals. It includes correspondence between Kafka and writer Milena Jesenská. Some of the explanatory texts are hardly readable, because they are located on transparent surfaces with exhibits in the same color as the letters. All texts are in English, some - mainly quotations - also in Czech and German. The impression therefore is that the museum is made mainly for foreign tourists rather than people from the Czech Republic. There are two permanent exhibitions: one explores Prague's influence on Kafka's work, and the other focuses on how Kafka describes Prague in his writing.

The museum features strange and absurd design elements that are inspired by Franz Kafka's unusual ideas. The space is dark and has special elements such as a long, red-lit staircase and mysterious sound effects. Outside the museum is a sculpture called Piss, a bronze fountain of two men urinating into a lake shaped like the Czech Republic. It was created by Czech sculptor David Černý in 2004.

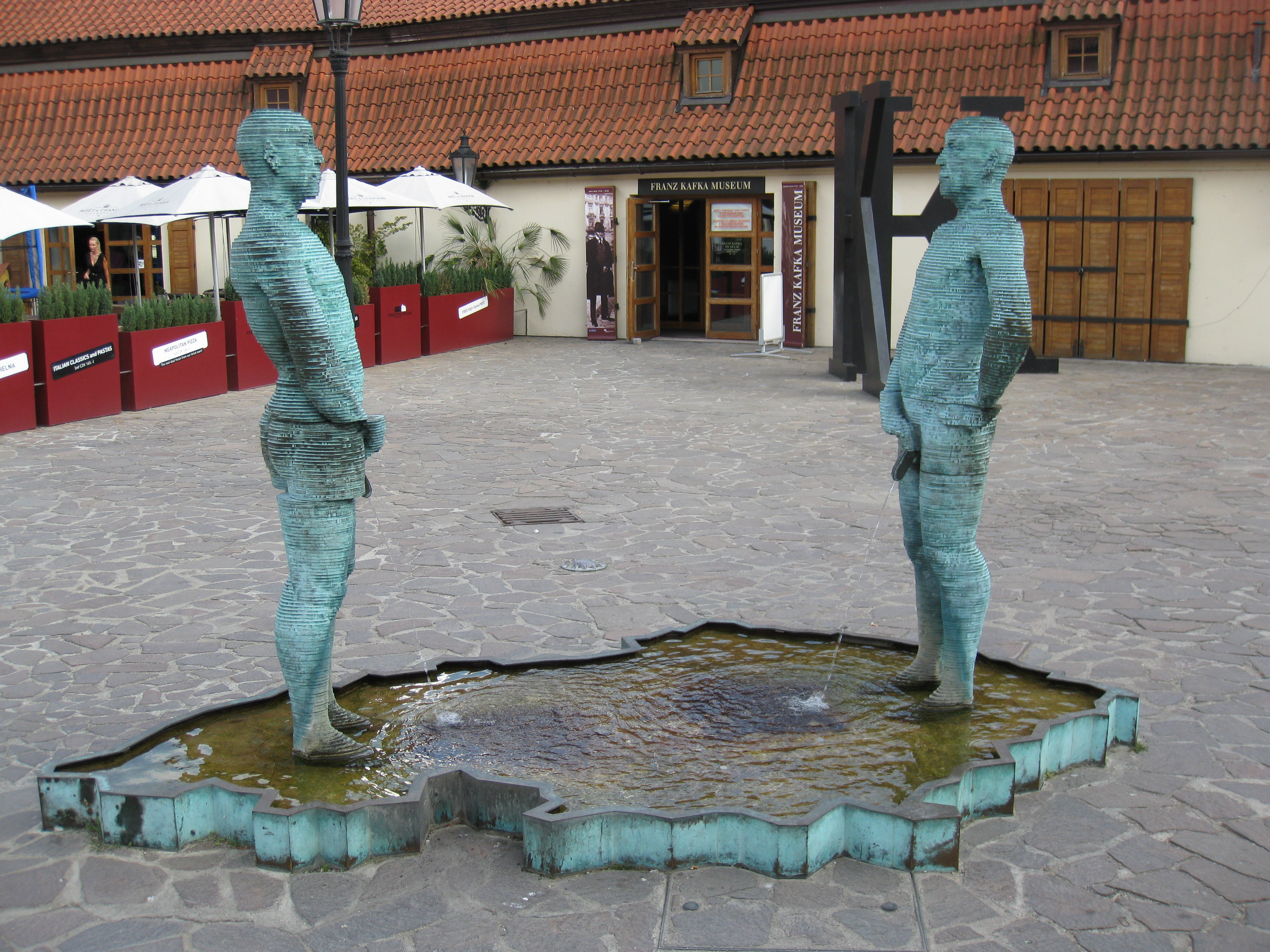
Cerný's statue outside the Franz Kafka Museum
