= Fuente de los Niños Miones =

Fountain in Guadalajara, Jalisco, Mexico

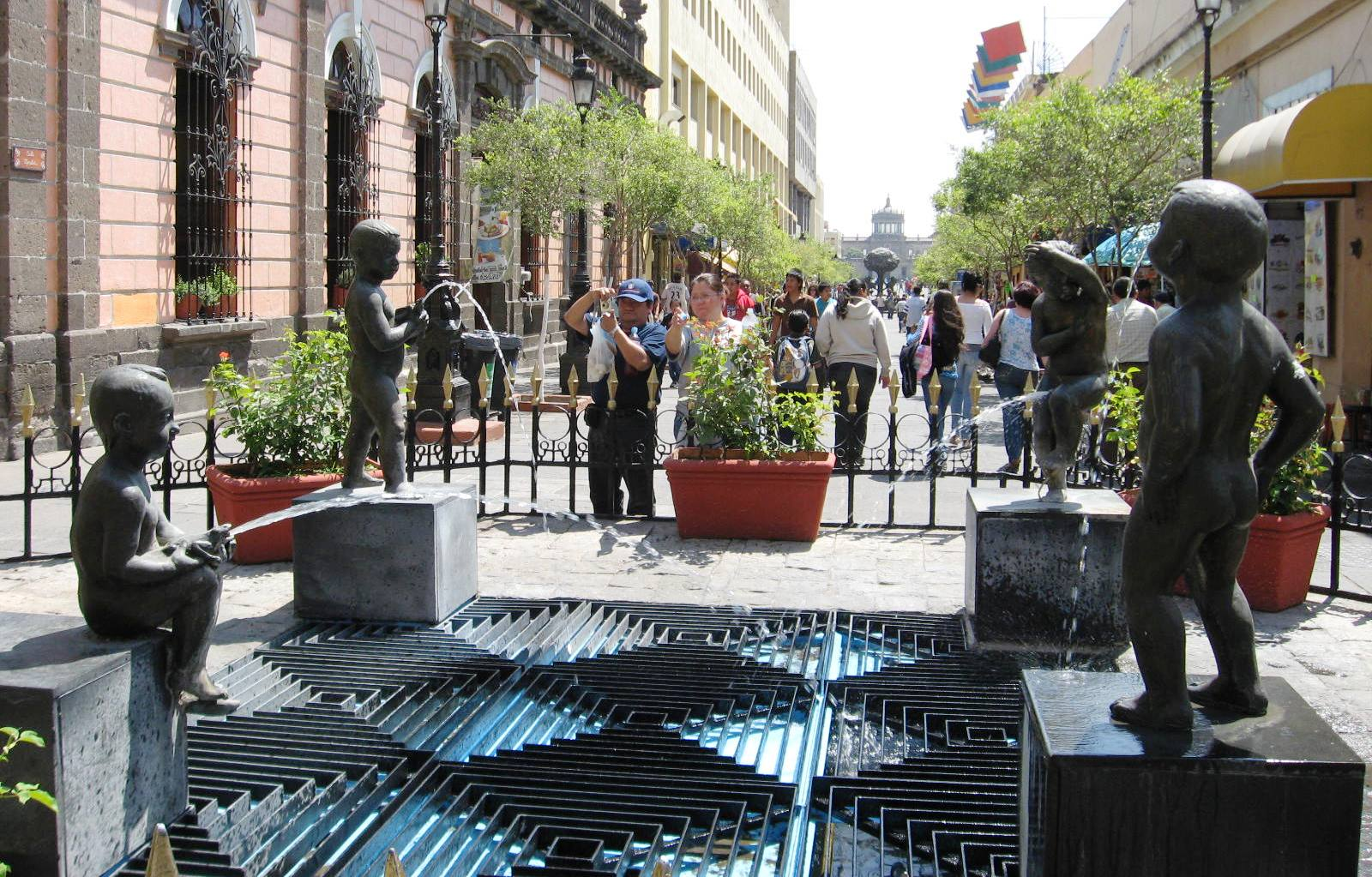
- The fountain in 2009
- Artist: Miguel Miramontes
- Year: 1982
- Location: Guadalajara, Jalisco, Mexico
- 20°40′36.2″N 103°20′34.6″W

The Fuente de los Niños Traviesos (lit. transl. Fountain of the Playful Children), colloquially known as the Fuente de los Niños Miones (lit. transl. Fountain of the Pissing Children), is a fountain with sculptures of boys in Guadalajara, in the Mexican state of Jalisco.

== History ==
In 2012, one of the children was stolen, but it was recovered promptly. On 15 May 2020, the fountain was vandalized again after a person stole one of the sculptures. The responsible was arrested days later and said he attempted to sell it as scrap.

== See also ==
- List of depictions of urine in art
- Manneken Pis, a fountain in Brussels, Belgium
- Piss (Černý), Prague
