= Body fluids in art =

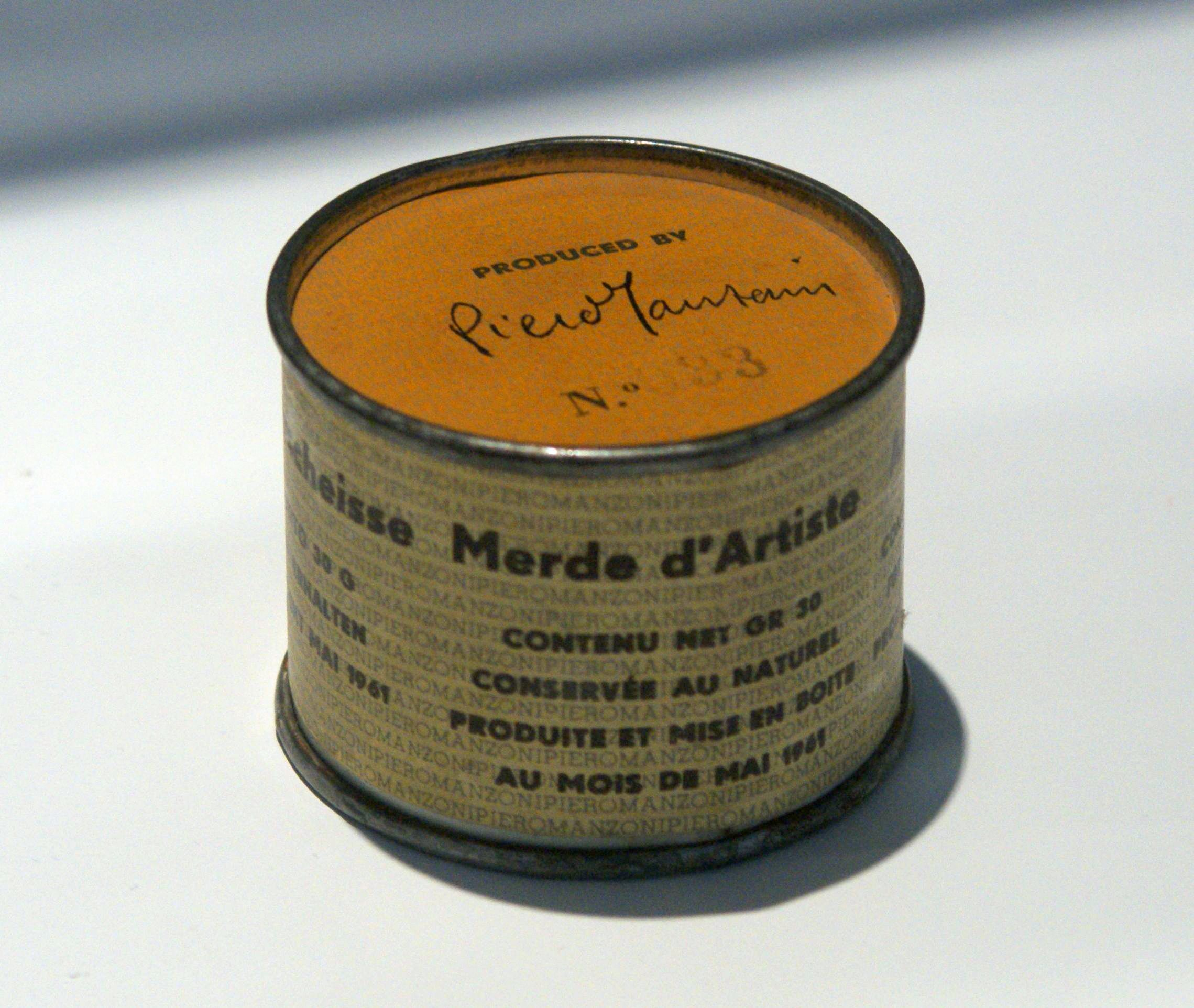
Artist's Shit by Piero Manzoni

Occasional use of body fluids such as blood, urine, feces, etc. in works of art is most common in shock art or transgressive art.

== Examples ==
=== Blood ===
- New York artist Vincent Castiglia uses his own blood to make paintings, and used it to make the artwork on the guitar of thrash metal musician Gary Holt.
- The Anguished Man, an allegedly haunted painting by an unknown artist, contains the artist's blood in its paint, according to its owner.
- The Flaming Lips released a limited run of vinyl records of the 2012 album Heady Fwends containing the blood of the musicians involved, sold for $2,500 each.
- An Illustration of Emperor Jinmu's Campaign to Conquer the East (神武天皇御東征の図, Jinmu Tennō go-Tōsei no zu), painted by Japanese illustrator Itō Hikozō entirely with his own blood in 1932.
- Dutch artist Poppy Koning has produced paintings using her own blood.

=== Urine ===
- Andy Warhol created Piss paintings in the 1960s as well as Oxidation paintings between 1977 and 1988. They both involved his collaborators urinating on large canvases laid out on the floor of his studio at 860 Broadway in New York City. The Piss paintings were strictly urine on white canvases prepared with gesso. The Oxidation paintings involved canvases that were prepared with metallic powders.
- Piss Christ, a controversial 1987 photograph by American photographer Andres Serrano, depicts a small plastic crucifix submerged in a small glass tank full of the artist's urine.
- PISSED, a glass cube containing 200 gallons of the urine of Canadian transgender artist Cassils, was made in 2017 as a protest against a decision by the Trump administration to revoke an Obama administration executive order which guaranteed that transgender students could use restrooms that corresponded with their gender identity. It is currently on exhibition at the Leslie-Lohman Museum of Art.
- Artist-researcher Jatun Risba has explored urine as an artistic material in UroeliXir (2025), a 48-day durational research performance centred on the consumption of the artist’s own first morning urine and documented through instant film photography, video, and collected samples, and Imaginatio (2026), a participatory ritual-performance inviting audiences to create a collective body print exploring embodied spirituality, vulnerability, and metabolic exchange.

=== Feces ===
- Artist's Shit, a 1961 artwork by Italian artist Piero Manzoni, consists of 90 tin cans reportedly filled with 30 grams (1.1 ounces) of his feces.

=== Breast milk ===
- In the work All You Can Feel, the artist Sarah Ancelle Schönfeld sprinkles exposed photo negatives with hormones or endogenous substances such as breast milk and pharmacological substances such as the contraceptive pill.

=== Human fat ===
- Wenming zhu (文明柱, Civilization Pillar) was made by artist duo Sun Yuan & Peng Yu in 2001. The work resembles a classical stone column, but it is, in fact, composed of layers of congealed, gleaming human fat, alongside wax and metal, the former of which was collected from plastic surgery clinics, and is currently held by the M+ Museum in Hong Kong.

== Criticism and difficulties ==
Depicting objects of popular respect (religious subjects, flags, etc.) in art which includes body fluids can trigger public protests due to such material's historic association with dirtiness. The outcry about the Piss Christ photo is an example.

In addition to the obvious difficulties of preserving perishable material, there can be regulations complicating transport by rail, truck, or aircraft of liquid body fluids due to the fluids' possible classification as dangerous goods.

The sale of blood art via eBay is prohibited as eBay prohibits the sale of body parts, and classifies blood art as falling under this heading.

== See also ==
- New materials in 20th-century art
- Urine in art
