= New materials in 20th-century art =

Andy Warhol, Campbell's Tomato Juice Box, 1964, Synthetic polymer paint and silkscreen ink on wood, 10×19×9.5 in (250×480×240 mm), Museum of Modern Art, New York City

New materials in 20th-century art were introduced to art making from the very beginning of the century. The introduction of new materials (and techniques) and heretofore non-art materials helped drive change in art during the 20th century. Traditional materials and techniques were not necessarily displaced in the 20th century. Rather, they functioned alongside innovations that came with the 20th century. Such mainstays as oil-on-canvas painting, and sculpting in traditional materials continued right through the 20th century into the 21st century. Furthermore, even "traditional" materials were greatly expanded in the course of the 20th century. The number of pigments available to artists (painters, primarily) has increased both in quantity and quality, by most reckoning. New formulations for traditional materials especially the commercial availability of acrylic paint have become widely used, introducing initial issues over their stability and longevity.

Pablo Picasso, Georges Braque, Kurt Schwitters, Joseph Cornell and others incorporated paper collage and mixed drawing (materials) with paint to fashion their work. Both Picasso and Marcel Duchamp pioneered the use of found objects as material for paintings and sculpture during the 1910s. In the 1940s Jackson Pollock pioneered the use of housepaint, silver and aluminum paint, duco, and various objects for use in his paintings. In the 1950s Robert Rauschenberg included 3-D elements like tires and stuffed animals as well as using discarded materials like crushed or flattened cardboard boxes. Yves Klein incorporated live nude models and a symphony orchestra in his performance pieces of his paintings. John Chamberlain used crushed auto parts for sculpture. In the 1960s Pop artists Andy Warhol, Claes Oldenburg, Tom Wesselmann and Roy Lichtenstein made art from commercial products, or art that resembled commercial products like television sets, soup cans, brillo boxes, comic books, household furniture and restaurant items among other things. Edward Kienholz made replicas of actual environments both domestic and commercial, while George Segal made life-size plaster figures in settings using real objects and props. Dan Flavin used electric fluorescent lights and ballasts to create sculpture. In the 1970s Frank Stella introduced honeycombed aluminum and glitter. In the 1980s Julian Schnabel made "plate paintings" with broken crockery stuck to the surface and then painted over, Anselm Kiefer and Richard Long used mud, soil or tar in their works. In the 1960s and again in the 1990s artists used excrement notably - the Italian artist Piero Manzoni in 1961 and the British artist Chris Ofili who specialized in using elephant dung in the 1990s. Tracey Emin included her bed, entitled My Bed, in 1999.

Some innovations concerning materials used in art merely function in a supportive way, and other innovative materials are much more conspicuous. Frank Stella's use of honeycombed aluminum served as a lightweight and strong and very configurable support for imagery. In the sculpture entitled "Monogram," by Robert Rauschenberg, an angora goat assumes a position of central importance.

== Early 20th century ==
Pablo Picasso, Compotier avec fruits, violon et verre, 1912

The advent of Modernism and Modern Art in the first decades of the 20th century inspired artists to test and transcend the boundaries and the limitations of the traditional and conventional forms of art making in search of newer forms and in search of new materials. The innovations of painters like Vincent van Gogh, Paul Cézanne, Paul Gauguin, Georges Seurat, Henri de Toulouse-Lautrec, and the French Symbolists provided essential inspiration for the development of modern art by the younger generation of artists in Paris and elsewhere in Europe. Henri Matisse and other young artists revolutionized the Paris art world with "wild", multi-colored, expressive, paintings that the critics called Fauvism. Henri Rousseau, Pablo Picasso, Giorgio de Chirico, Amedeo Modigliani, Marc Chagall, Robert Delaunay and scores of young artists in Paris made their first modern paintings venturing toward abstraction and other new ways of formulating figurative, still-life and landscape imagery.

=== 1900s ===
During the first decade of the 20th century modern art developed simultaneously in several different areas in Europe (France, England, Scandinavia, Russia, Germany, Italy), and in the United States. Artists began to formulate different directions of modern art, seemingly unrelated to one another.

In printmaking, the linocut was invented by the artists of Die Brücke in Germany between 1905 and 1913. At first they described their prints as woodcuts, which sounded more respectable. The technique remains popular as a very simple method of printmaking, even suitable for use in schools.

=== 1910s ===
==== Cubism ====
Pablo Picasso, Georges Braque, Juan Gris and other cubist artists introduced new elements and materials like newspaper clippings, fabric, and sheet music into their paintings. Eventually the movement was called Synthetic Cubism developed between 1912 and 1919. Synthetic cubism is characterized by works with different textures, surfaces, collage elements, papier collé and a large variety of subject matter. It was the beginning of collage materials being introduced as an important ingredient of fine art work by the avant-garde.

Considered the first work of this new style was Pablo Picasso's "Still Life with Chair-caning" (1911–1912), which includes oil cloth that was printed to look like chair-caning pasted onto an oval canvas, with text; and rope framing the whole picture. At the upper left are the letters "JOU", which appear in many cubist paintings and refers to the newspaper titled "Le Journal".

==== Dada ====
The Dada movement began during World War I as a protest against the madness and violence of war. Applying shock tactics and anarchy to art the Dadaists pioneered the use of new artistic techniques such as collage, photomontage readymades and the use of found objects. Artists like Marcel Duchamp, Hannah Höch, Kurt Schwitters, Francis Picabia, Man Ray and others incorporated into their work random everyday objects often combined with more conventional artist materials. They included photographs, panes of glass, picture frames, eyeglasses, boxes, newspapers, magazines, ticket stubs, metal pipes, bulbs, bottle racks, urinals, bicycle wheels and other objects. Marcel Duchamp created The Bride Stripped Bare by Her Bachelors, Even, working on the piece from 1915 to 1923. He made the work on two panes of glass; with materials such as lead foil, fuse wire, and dust.

=== 1920s ===
==== Surrealism ====
During the 1930s Surrealist artist Méret Oppenheim created sexually charged erotic pieces. Oppenheim's best known piece is Object (Le Déjeuner en fourrure) (1936). The sculpture consists of a teacup, saucer and spoon that the artist covered with fur from a Chinese gazelle. It is displayed at the Museum of Modern Art in New York.

== Mid 20th century ==
Le Saut dans le Vide (Leap into the Void); photomontage by Shunk-Kender of a performance by Yves Klein at Rue Gentil-Bernard, Fontenay-aux-Roses, October 1960.

=== 1950s ===
Robert Rauschenberg began to create what became known as his Combine paintings in the early 1950s.

=== 1960s ===
In 1960 Yves Klein incorporated live nude models and a symphony orchestra in his performance pieces of his paintings. Klein also made use of Photomontage in the famous pseudo-performance picture of himself diving off a wall onto a Paris street Le Saut dans le Vide (Leap into the Void. In the 1960s John Chamberlain continued using crushed auto parts for sculpture. Dan Flavin used electric fluorescent lights and ballasts to create his sculpture. In May 1961 Italian artist Piero Manzoni used his own excrement, selling it in cans titled Artist's Shit (Merda d'Artista). However the contents of the cans remain a much-disputed enigma, since opening them would destroy the value of the artwork. Various theories about the contents have been proposed, including speculation that it is plaster.

== See also ==
- Arte Povera
- Photomontage
- Tehching Hsieh
- Body fluids in art
- Plastics in art
- Media (arts)
- List of art materials

== Sources ==
- Cooper, Douglas (1970). The Cubist Epoch. London: Phaidon in association with the Los Angeles County Museum of Art & the Metropolitan Museum of Art. ISBN 0-87587-041-4.
- Richardson, John. A Life Of Picasso, The Cubist Rebel 1907–1916. New York: Alfred A. Knopf, 1991, ISBN 978-0-307-26665-1
