= London Booster =

Art installation in Prague, Czechia

Coordinates: 50°2′16.97″N 14°29′52.47″E

- Klikující autobus (Czech)
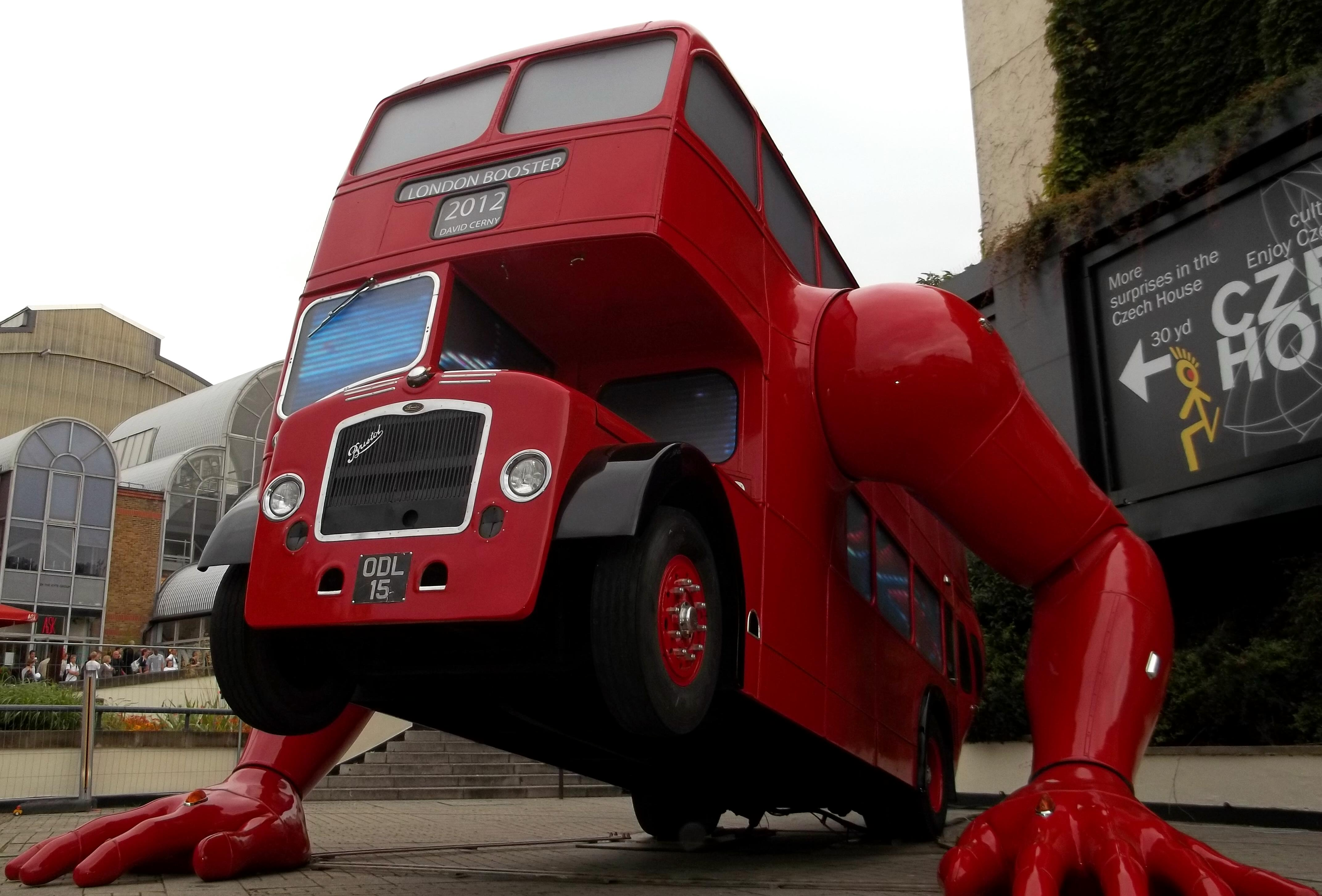
- London Booster in London, 2012
- Artist: David Černý
- Year: 2012
- Subject: Push-up, double-decker bus
- Dimensions: 900 cm (350 in)
- Location: Prague
- Owner: Agrofert

The London Booster is an art installation by the Czech artist David Černý that consists of a bus fitted with hydraulic arms, allowing it to do push-ups. The action is accompanied by audiovisual effects. The piece was created to celebrate the 2012 Summer Olympics and to inspire the Czech Olympic team. It was installed outside the Business Design Centre in Islington, which for the duration of the games was transformed into "Czech House".

After the Olympics, the bus was installed in the Prague neighborhood of Chodov, in front of the headquarters of Agrofert, a company owned by former Czech prime minister Andrej Babiš, which sponsored the work.

== Bus ==
The bus itself is a 1950s Bristol Lodekka LD double-decker with ECW bodywork. Despite being painted red, it never saw use as a London bus; it was new to the Isle of Wight–based operator Southern Vectis, numbered 555, registered ODL 15, and painted in the company's green livery. After twenty years of service, it was sold to a dealer who exported it to a museum in the Netherlands. In the 1990s, it was sold to a private operator, who returned it to use in the Netherlands as a red corporate hospitality vehicle, registered BE-27-64. Černý sourced it in December 2011 from a Dutch dealer.

Video of London Booster in London

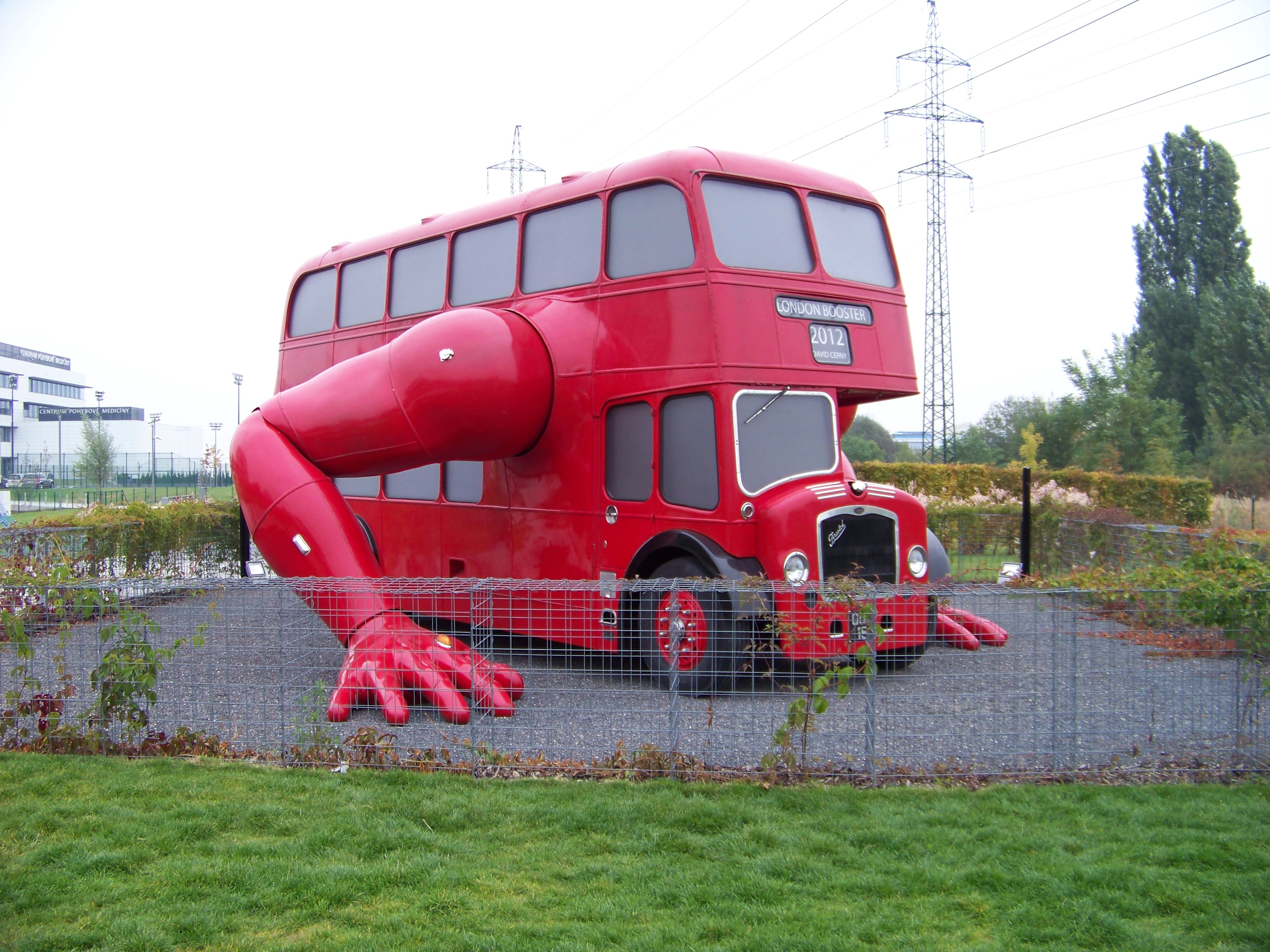
London Booster in Prague
