= Urine in art =

Urine in art may refer to:

- The use of urine in works of art (see body fluids in art)
- Depictions of urine or the act of urination in art (see: List of depictions of urine in art)
