= Puer mingens =

Figures in art of a boy urinating

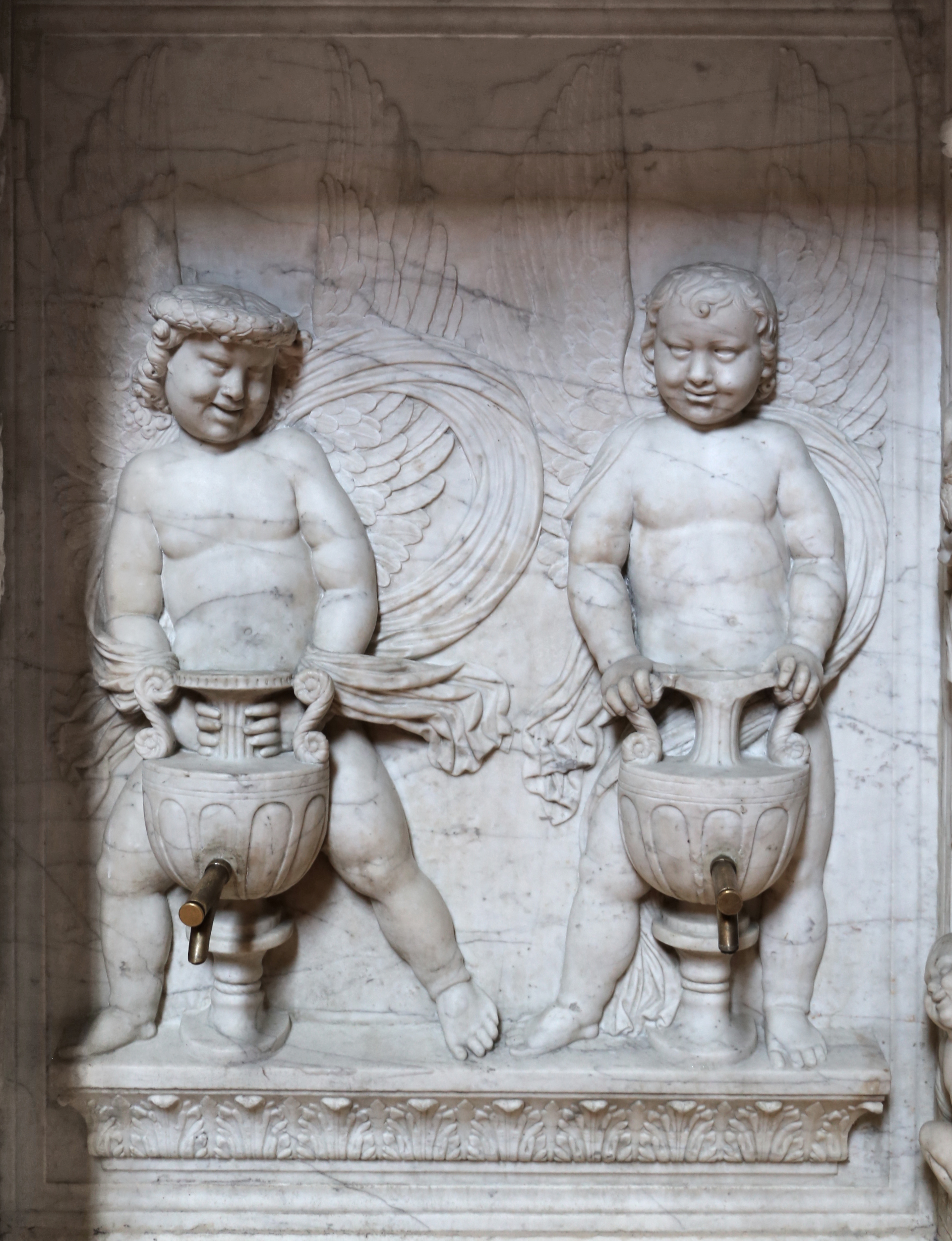
Two pueri mingentes in the sacristy lavabo, Florence Cathedral

A puer mingēns (Latin: [ˈpʊ.ɛr ˈmɪŋ.ɡeːns]; pl.: puerī mingentēs [ˈpʊ.ɛr.iː mɪŋ.ˈɡɛn.teːs]) is a figure in a work of art depicted as a prepubescent boy in the act of urinating, either actual or simulated. The puer mingens could represent anything from whimsy and boyish innocence to erotic symbols of virility and masculine bravado.

== Etymology and word play ==
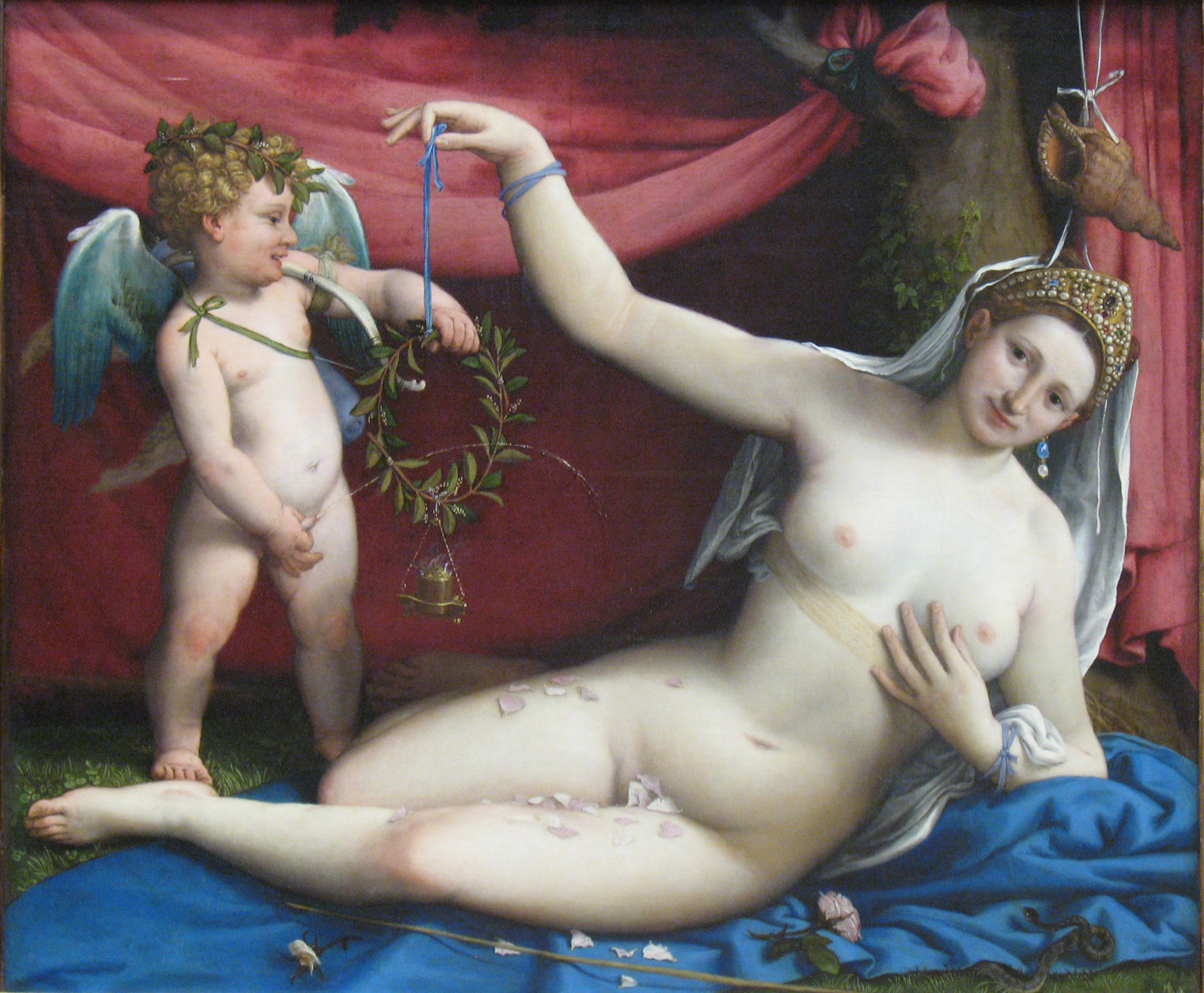
Venus and Cupid, Lorenzo Lotto, 1530, Metropolitan Museum of Art

The term puer mingens comes from the Latin puer, meaning "boy", and from the Latin mingens; "urinating", the present participle of the verb mingere which means "to urinate".

In Latin, verbs for urinating like mingere were frequently employed in the sense of "to ejaculate". This connotation was preserved in various descendants of Latin, including Italian with such words as pisciare. On account of this, the urine emitted from the penis of the puer mingens can be interpreted symbolically as semen; and pueri mingentes are frequently found in works auguring fertility and fecundity. Lorenzo Lotto's Venus and Cupid is an example.

In several languages, such as Italian, French, and English, "to make water" was a euphemism for urinating. In allusion to this, one can find depictions of a puer mingens "making water" in works such as Michelangelo's Children's Bacchanal, or in church lavabos whose waterspouts are positioned in front of naked boys' groins (thereby giving the illusion that their urine has been transformed into water). Pueri mingentes were frequently incorporated as fully functioning statues whose pipes shot forth streams of water out of the statues' penises. One of the most famous examples of this is Manneken Pis in Brussels.

== Renaissance revivals of puer mingens ==
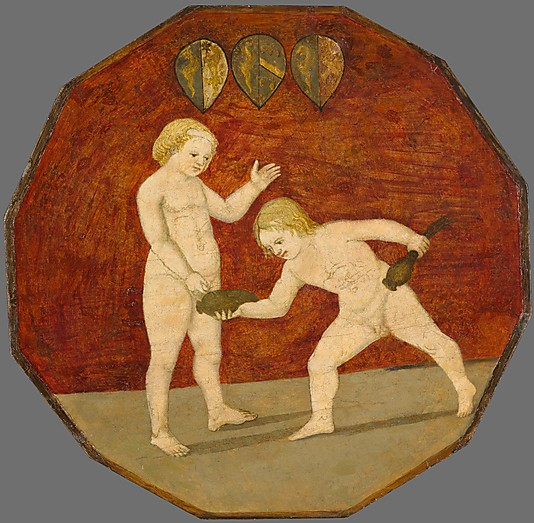
Puer mingens with poppy pods, on a desco da parto, Apollonio di Giovanni, 1450s, Kress collection

Pueri mingentes are a classical motif occasionally found in antiquity. Ancient Roman examples of pueri mingentes occurred mainly on children's sarcophagi.

The puer mingens was revived during the Renaissance. Donatello, who paved the way in the reinvention of the larger motif of the putti in sculpture, depicted one of the earliest Renaissance examples of a puer mingens on the base of his Judith and Holofernes statue. From its revival in 15th-century Florence, the artistic motif of urinating boys spread throughout the rest of Europe, reaching its height of popularity during the late Renaissance in the sixteenth and seventeenth centuries before gradually receding in popularity.

== Pueri mingentes locations ==
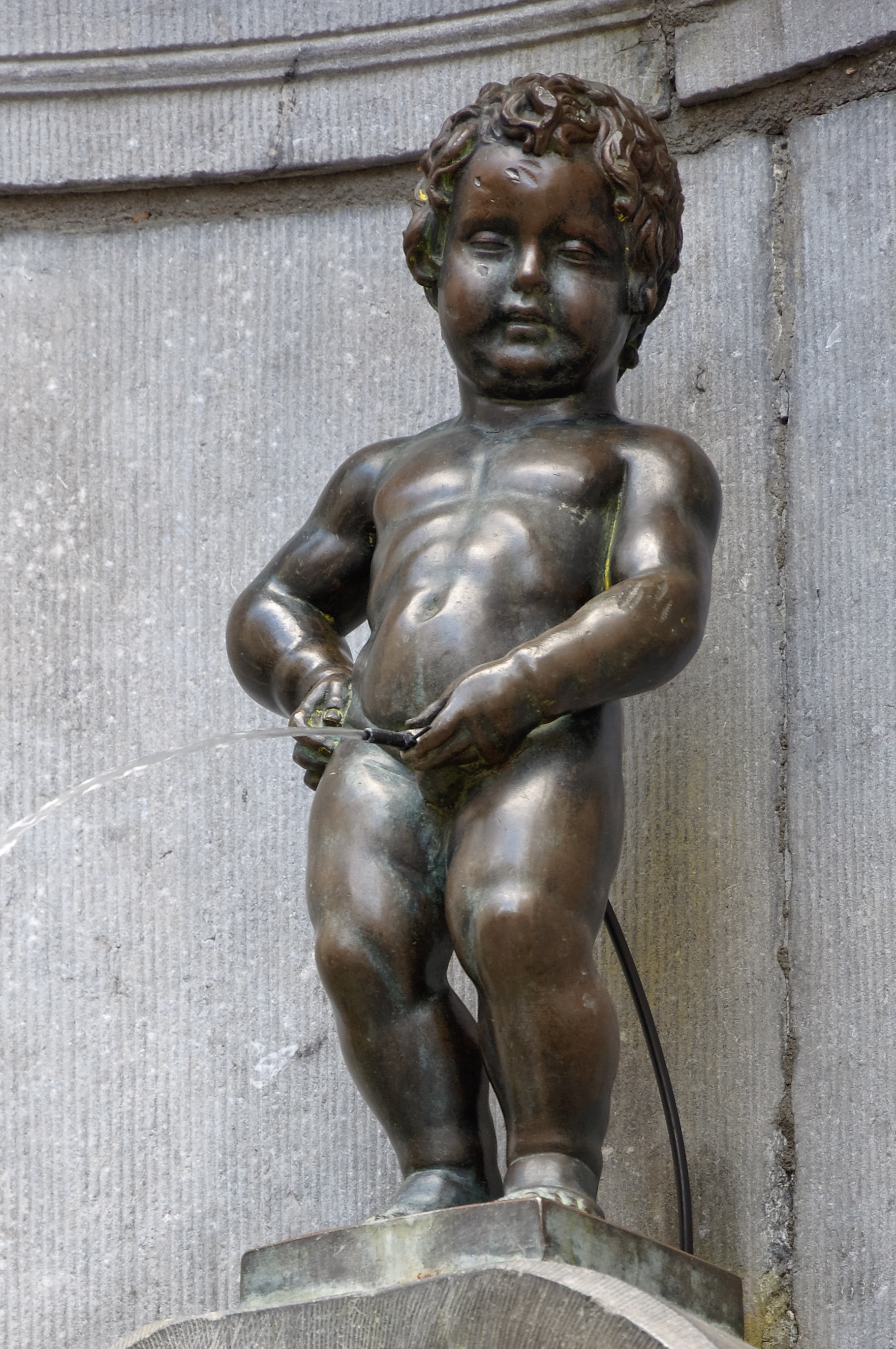
Manneken Pis, a famous example of a puer mingens functioning as a fountain, Brussels

In Roman times the puer mingens was generally found in depictions of Bacchic rites on children's sarcophagi. From the Renaissance onward, the puer mingens can be found in both secular and religious art and across a range of media, from illuminated manuscripts, functional fountains, frescoes, to apotropaic amulets.

Owing to the abovementioned associations with fertility, pueri mingentes are found on deschi da parto – trays given to pregnant women and those who had recently given birth in order to betoken and celebrate the healthy birth of male offspring. Paintings intended as wedding gifts, such as Lorenzo Lotto's Venus and Cupid, might also feature urinating boys.

The puer mingens was prominently incorporated into fountains that would shoot water out of the statue's penis. Although this artistic motif is Roman in origin, there is scant attestation of working fountains incorporating pueri mingentes in Roman times; the Romans did, however, have functional statues portraying the adult Priapus urinating, which may have inspired the Renaissance development of statues of urinating boys. In addition to public spaces, such as Manneken Pis's location in central Brussels, functional fountains also graced many private sixteenth- and seventeenth-century gardens across Europe.

== Gallery ==
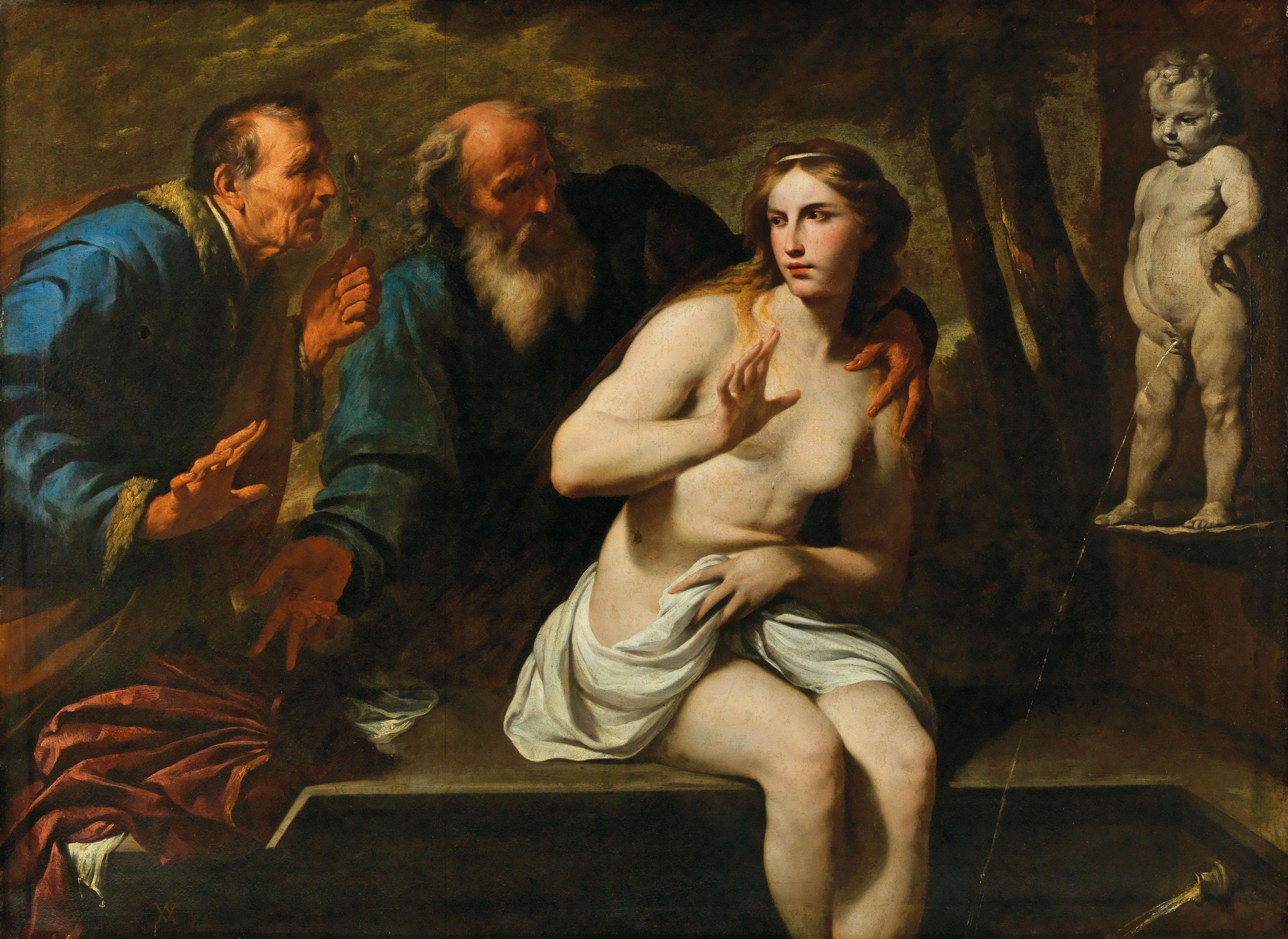
A puer mingens statue in Susanna and the Elders by Andrea Vaccaro, 1650s

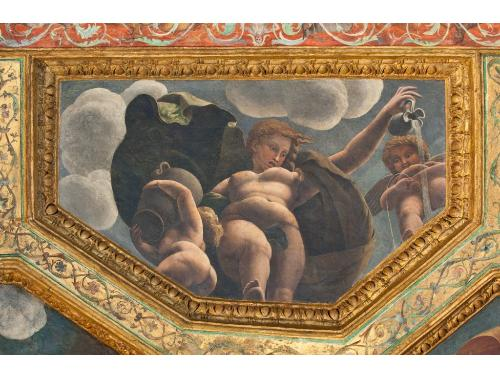
A puer mingens next to a nymph pouring water, 1526–1528, Palazzo del Te, Mantua

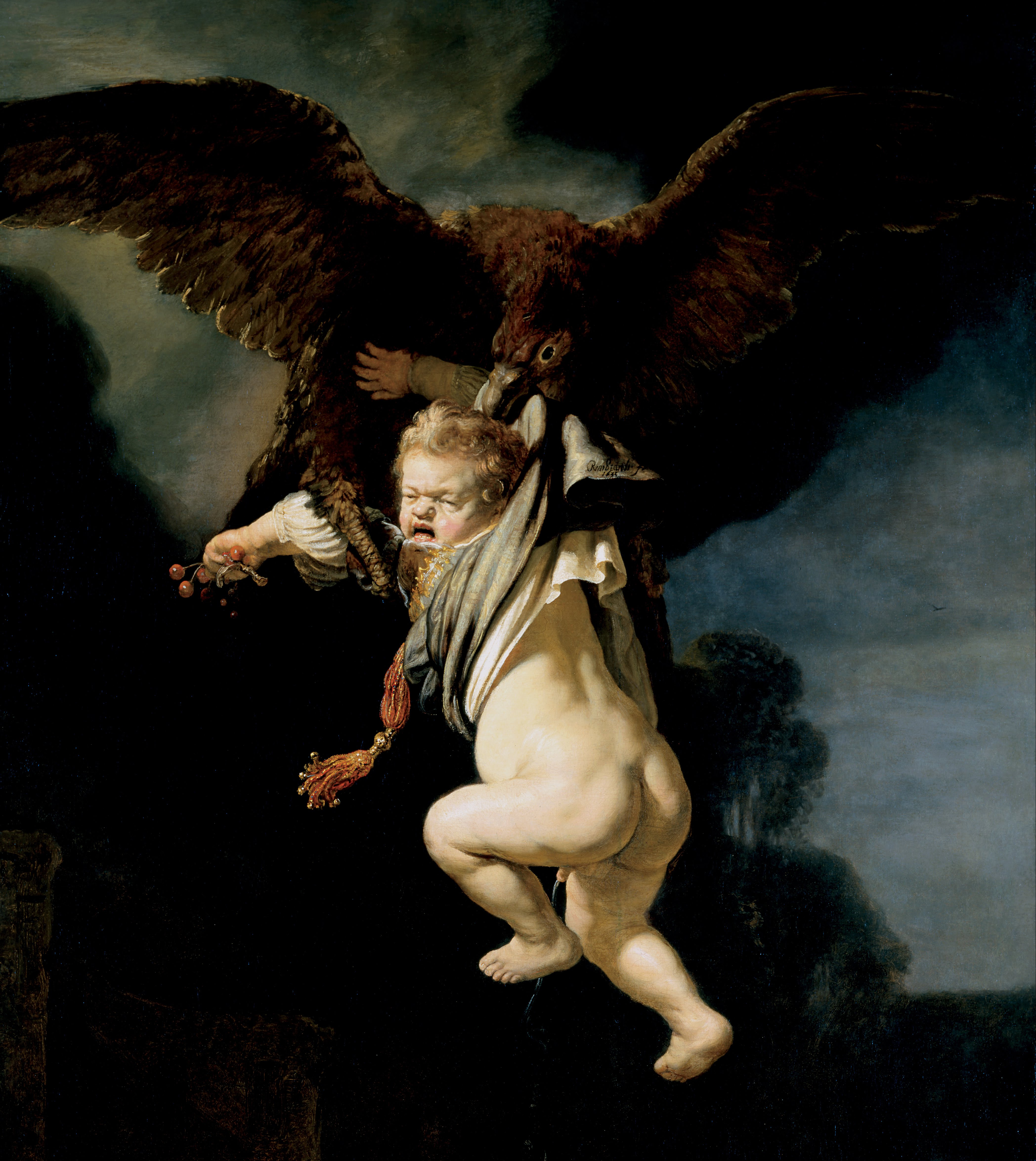
A puer mingens showing Ganymede with his buttocks and penis exposed, and urinating from fright while being taken away by Jupiter as an eagle, The Rape of Ganymede (1635) at Staatliche Kunstsammlungen in Dresden

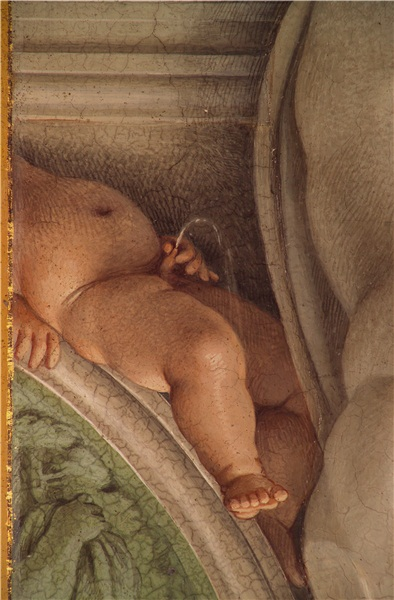
A close up view of a puer mingens by Annibale Carracci, 1600, Palazzo Farnese, Rome

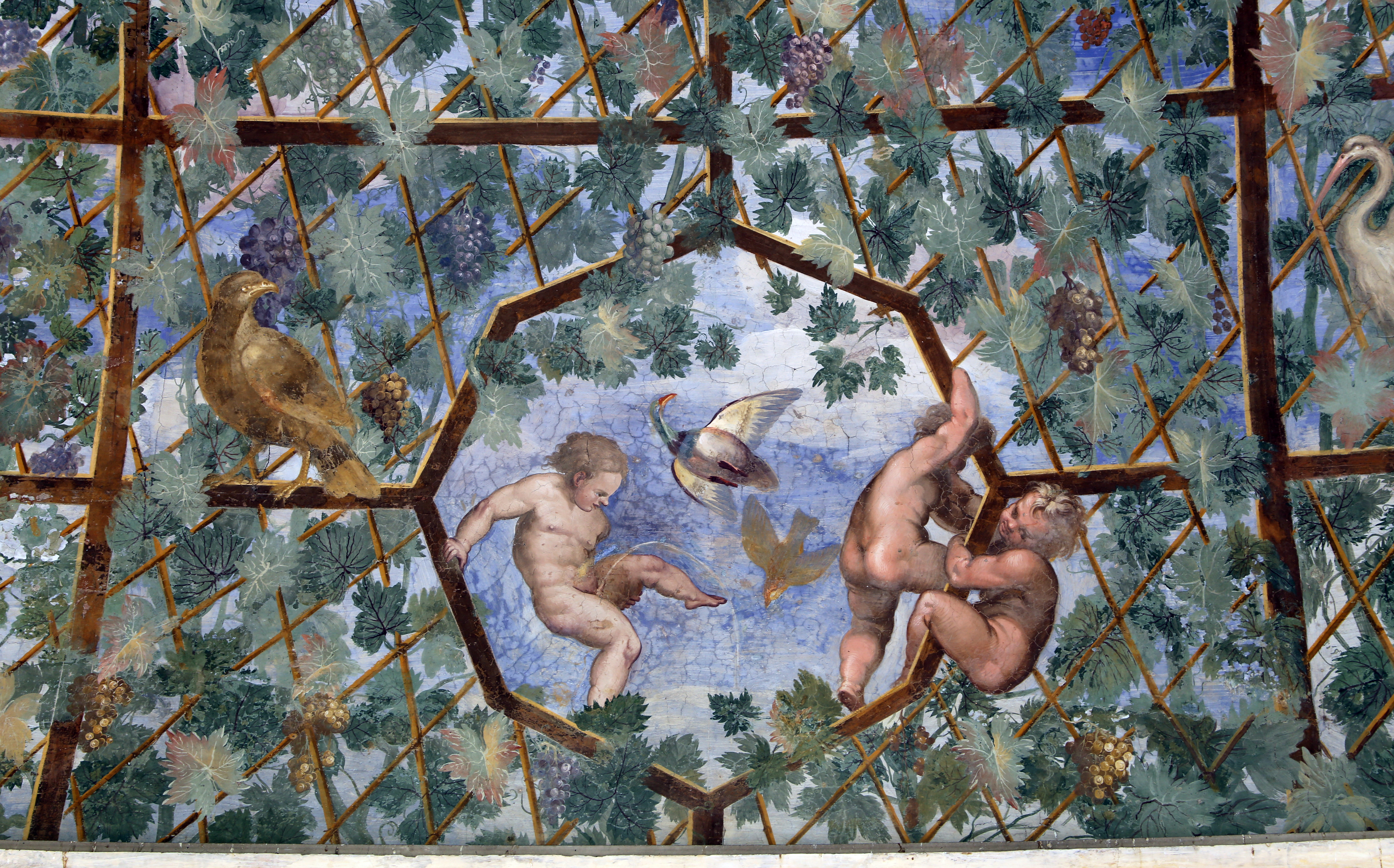
A puer mingens on the ceiling of the Villa Giulia, Rome

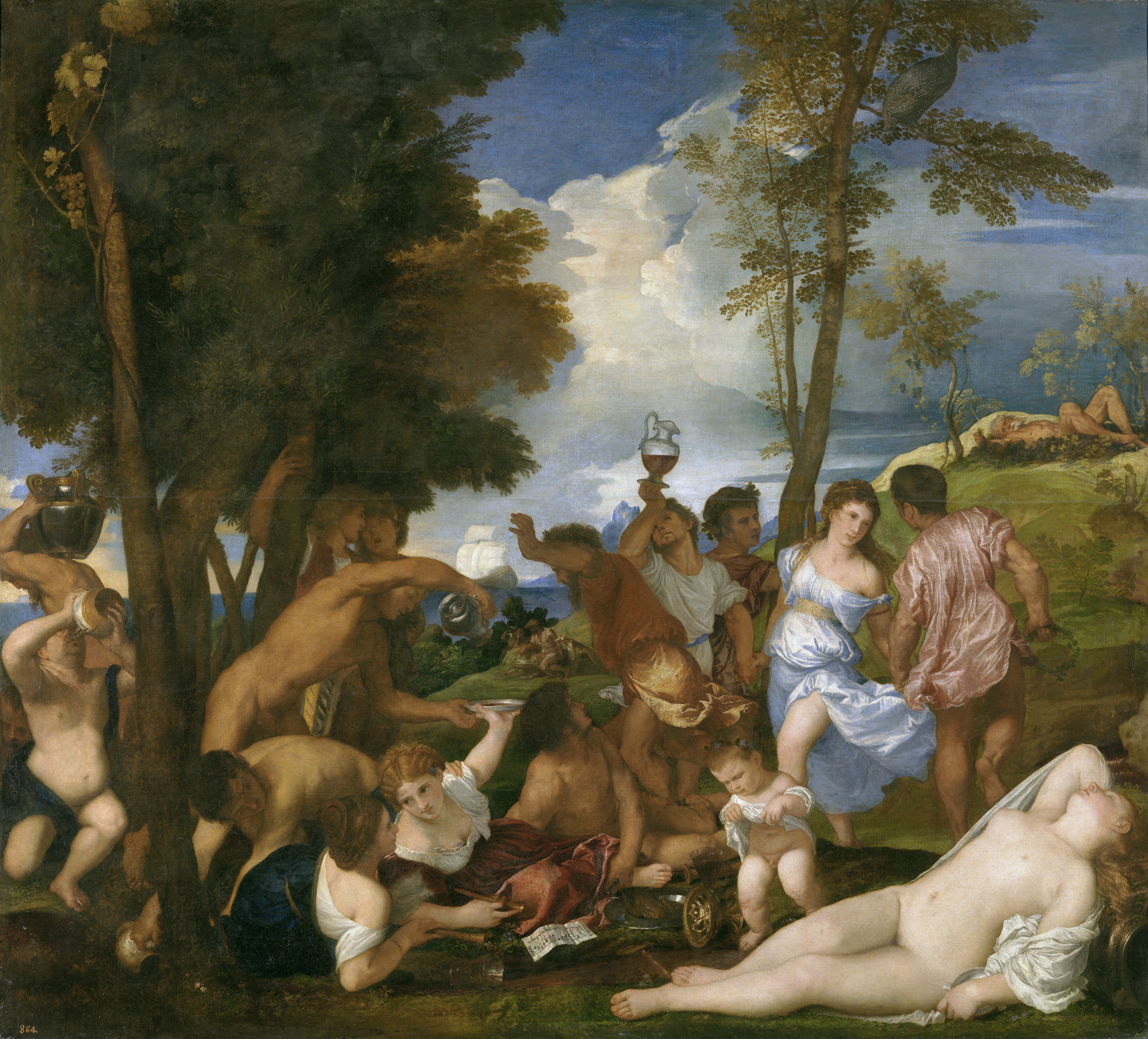
A puer mingens painted in The Bacchanal of the Andrians by Titian, 1523–1526, Museo del Prado, Madrid

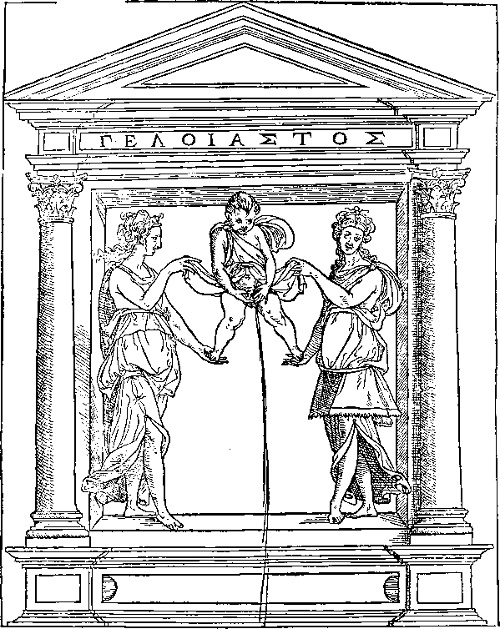
Woodcut of a puer mingens, from the Hypnerotomachia Poliphili, 1499

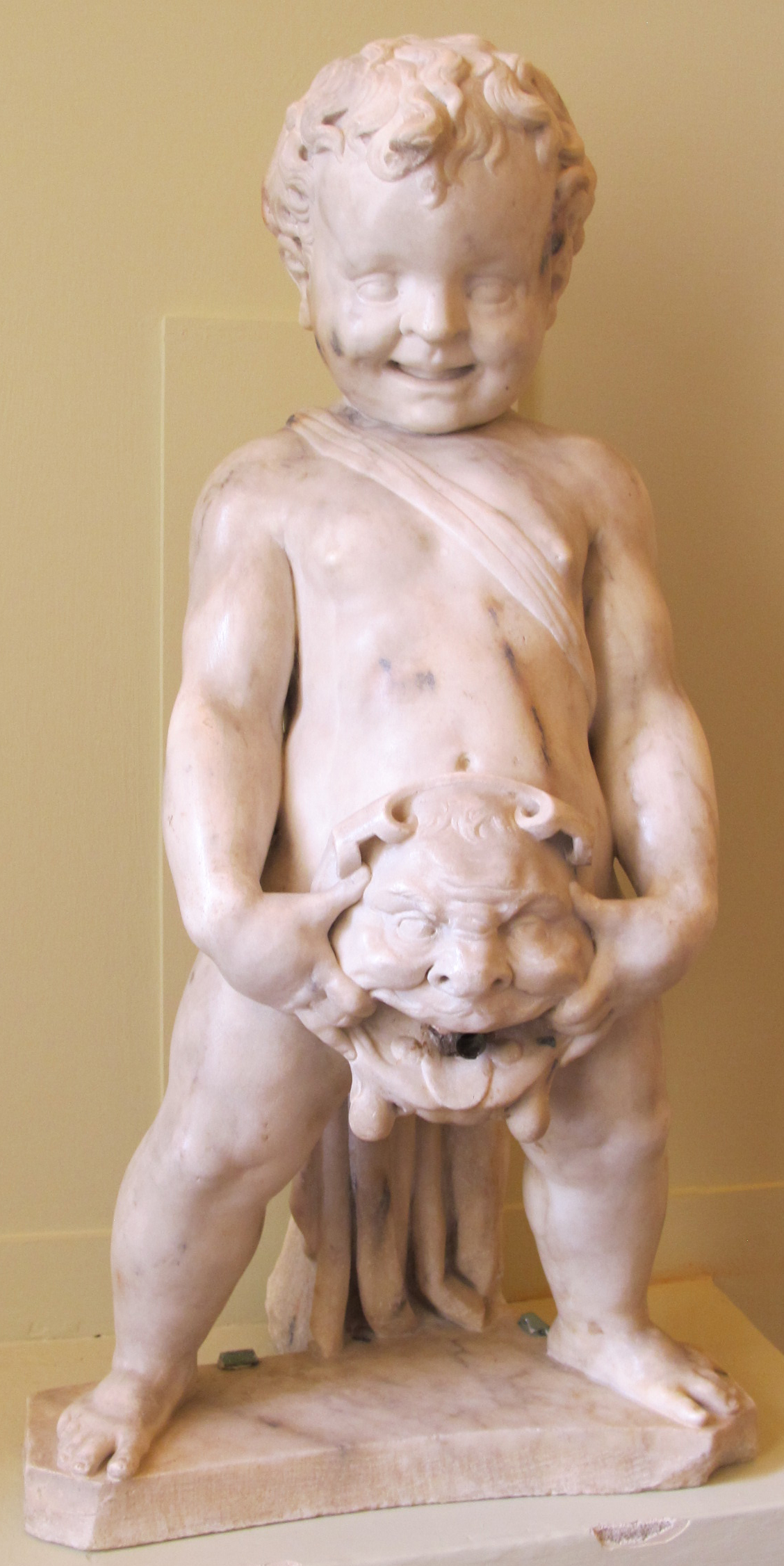
A puer mingens statue with a mask covering its genitals, Pierino da Vinci, 1540s, Museo nazionale d'arte medievale e moderna della Basilicata, Matera, Italy

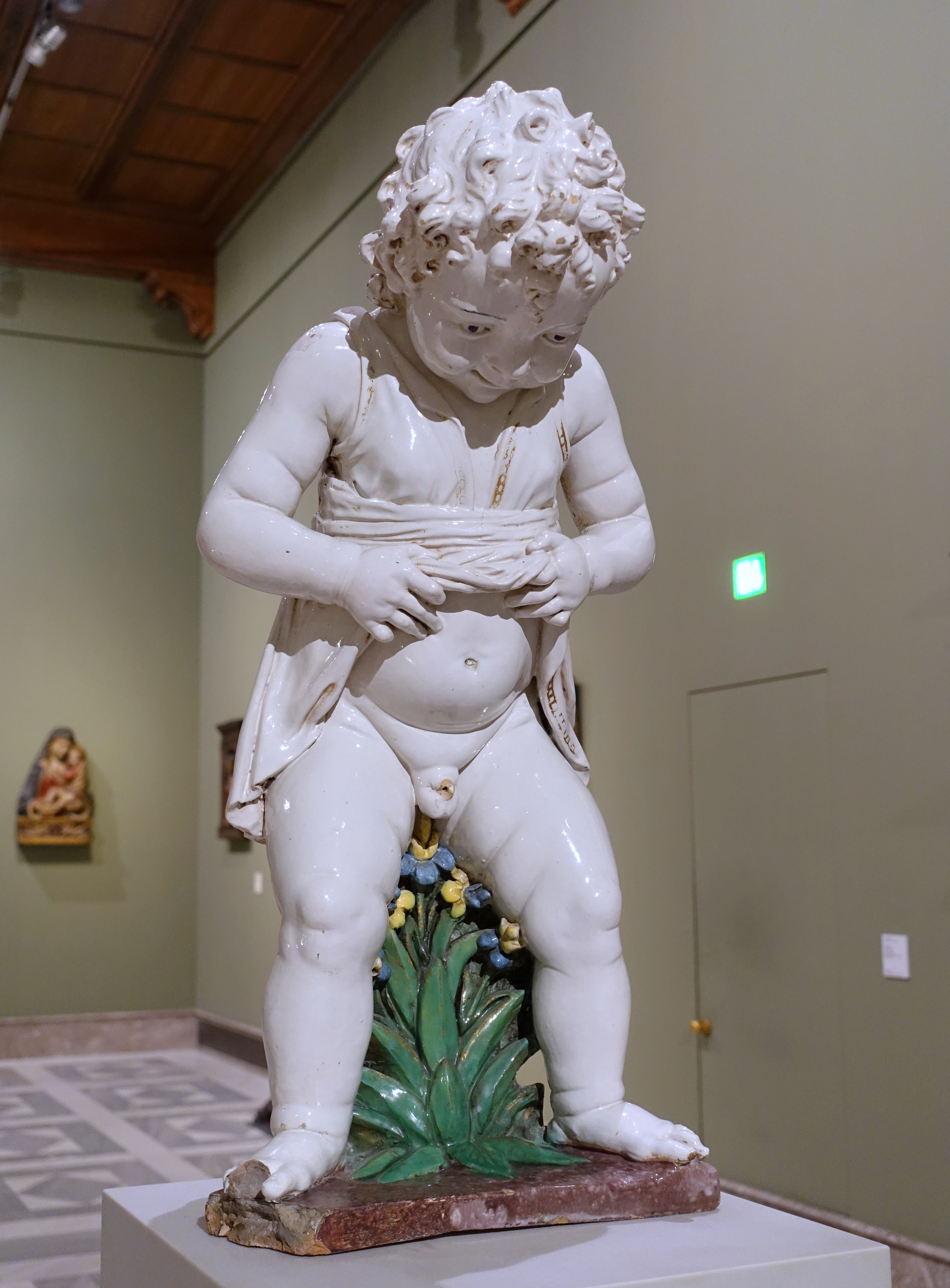
A glazed terracotta statue of a puer mingens, Andrea della Robbia, c. 1490, Bode Museum, Berlin

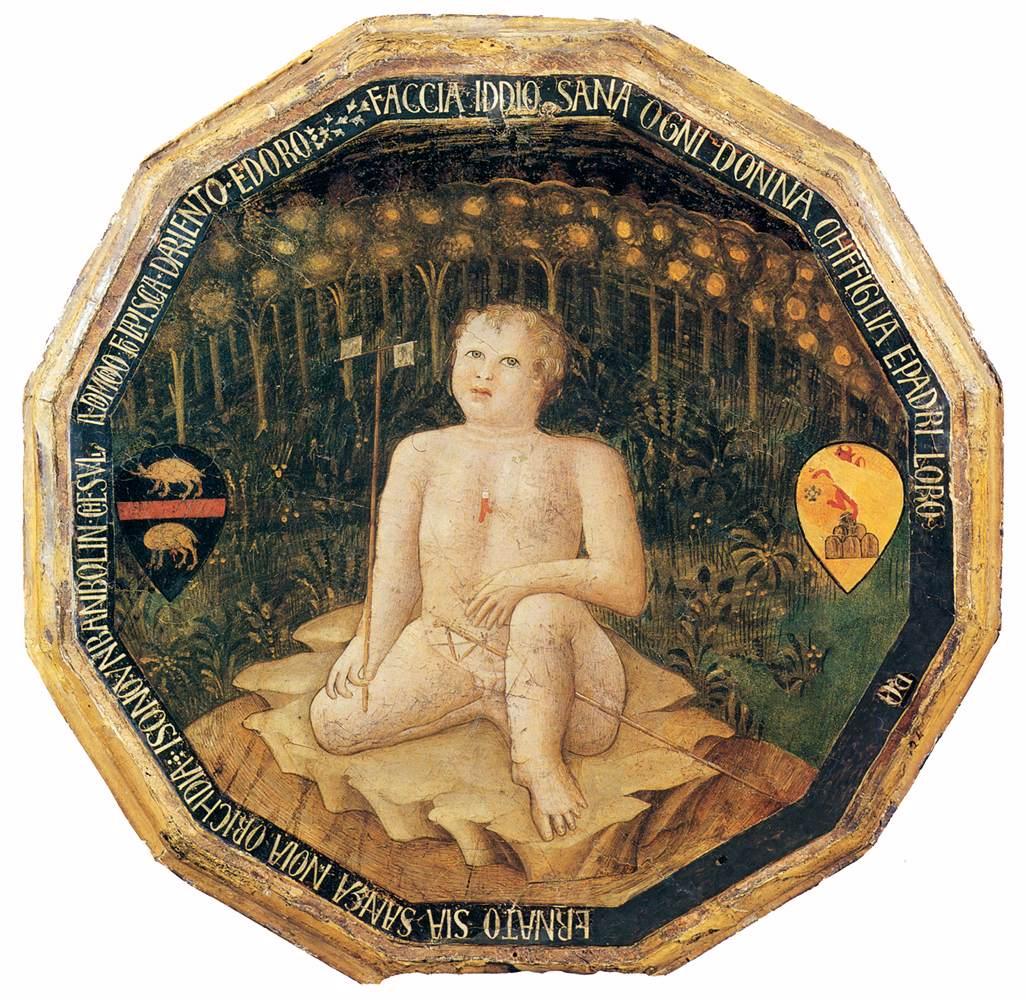
A puer mingens on a desco da parto, Bartolomeo di Fruosino, 1428, New York Historical Society

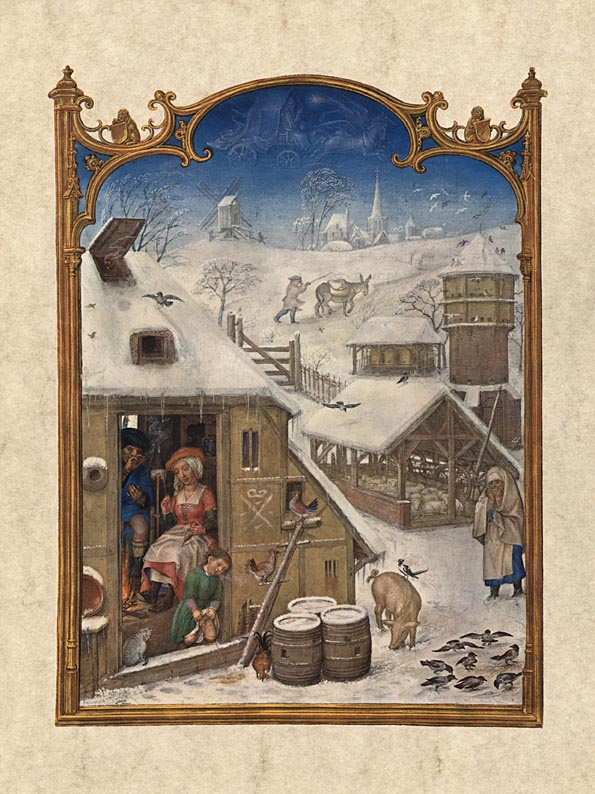
A puer mingens depicted in the Grimani Breviary, c. 1510, Biblioteca Marciana, Venice

== See also ==
- Putti – Artistic depictions of naked boys
- Manneken Pis (1619) – A bronze statue in Brussels of a naked little boy urinating
- Tea pet
- List of depictions of urine in art
