= Petra (sculpture) =

- Artist: Marcel Walldorf
- Year: 2010
- Medium: Silicone and metal
- Subject: Policewoman in riot control gear squatting down and urinating

Petra is a sculpture made in 2010 by the German artist Marcel Walldorf. It is a lifelike representation of a policewoman in riot control gear squatting down and urinating. Although controversial for its alleged misogyny, it obtained an award from the Leinemann-Stiftung für Bildung und Kunst in 2011.

== Description ==
The life-size sculpture, made of silicone and metal, is of a woman in armored olive-green German riot control police uniform, wearing a sidearm. Most of her face is hidden behind a protective helmet and a black ski mask. She is squatting on her haunches, legs spread, pants and underwear pulled down, exposing her genitals to urinate.

The sculpture contains a mechanism by which a liquid can be made to flow out of the sculpture's genitals, but to avoid damaging the wood-tiled floor, a puddle of simulated urine made of gelatin was substituted for the sculpture's exhibition in Dresden.

The title of the work, "Petra", is a common female given name in Germany.

== History ==
Petra is the first major work of Walldorf, a student at the Dresden Academy of Fine Arts. Walldorf built it in 2010, modelling the exposed body of the sculpture after a flatmate who posed for him.

The sculpture was sold to a collector in 2011. Walldorf has been commissioned to build two additional copies.

== Reception ==
Petra was shown at exhibitions in Berlin and Leipzig without attracting public notice. It was awarded the third prize, worth 1,000 euro, of the Kunstpreis für Nachwuchskünstler (award for young artists) of the Leinemann Foundation for 2011. The jury found that it showed "very well the difference between the public sphere and the private sphere."

In advance of its exhibition in Dresden in January 2011, Walldorf's teacher Eberhard Bosslet informed the country's largest tabloid newspaper, Bild, about the potentially controversial sculpture. Bild published a story asking: "Is this really art?", which triggered a plethora of media reports and public controversy. The Minister of the Interior of Saxony, Markus Ulbig, was quoted by Bild as saying: "This so-called work of art is a shame. It's an insult to policewomen. I'm shocked that there are bodies who award prizes to such so-called artists." The German police union also criticized the sculpture as insulting and as "breaching the limits of artistic freedom."

Nonetheless, the curator of the Dresden exhibition reported that the public response to the sculpture had been "overwhelmingly positive". Walldorf himself stated that he did not pursue any political objective with the sculpture, saying that he did not intend to criticize the state or to denounce anything or any profession. In an interview with Der Spiegel, he said that he merely wondered, after seeing male police officers on riot duty relieve themselves, how policewomen would deal with this problem.

== See also ==
- Urine in art
