= List of art media =

Materials used to create works of art

In art, a medium, form, or format is the material used by an artist to create a work of art. The term may also refer more broadly to the material and technical means used in a particular art form, such as paint in painting, stone in sculpture, or ink in drawing. In art history and criticism, the plural media is often used for groups of artistic materials.

This article lists common art media by artistic field.

== Drawing ==
=== Common drawing media ===
- Charcoal
- Chalk
- Colored pencil
- Conté
- Crayon
- Graphite
- Ink
- Pastel
- Silverpoint

=== Common drawing supports ===
- Card stock
- Paper
- Papyrus
- Parchment
- Scratchboard
- Vellum
- Wood

== Painting ==
=== Common paint media ===
- Acrylic paint
- Encaustic
- Fresco
- Gouache
- Ink wash
- Oil paint
- Tempera
- Watercolor

=== Common painting supports ===
- Canvas
- Ceramic
- Cloth
- Glass
- Metal
- Paper
- Paperboard
- Vellum
- Wall
- Wood

== Printmaking ==
=== Common printmaking media ===
- Aquatint
- Collotype
- Engraving
- Etching
- Intaglio
- Linocut
- Lithography
- Mezzotint
- Monotype
- Screen-printing
- Wood engraving
- Woodcut

== Sculpture ==
=== Common sculptural media ===
- Bone
- Bronze
- Ceramic
- Clay
- Glass
- Granite
- Ice
- Ivory
- Marble
- Metal
- Papier-mâché
- Plaster
- Stone
- Synthetic resin
- Wax
- Wood

== Ceramics ==
- Bone china
- Clay
- Glaze
- Porcelain
- Pottery
- Terracotta

== Textiles ==
- Cotton
- Felt
- Flax
- Textile
- Wool
- Yarn

== Photography ==
=== Photographic media ===
- Image sensor
- Photographic film
- Silver nitrate

== Digital art ==
Digital art uses electronic and computational media, including software, digital images, and display or print output. Common digital tools include graphic art software, 3D computer graphics software, graphics tablets, and digital printing systems.

== Installation art ==
Installation art may incorporate a wide range of media, including sculptural materials, sound, light, video, found objects, and architectural space.

== Sound art ==
Sound art uses sound as its primary medium and may incorporate recorded audio, electronic sound, speech, or musical instruments.

== See also ==
- Medium specificity
- Mixed media
- Multimedia
- New materials in 20th-century art
