= Bad Bad Boy (sculpture) =

Concrete statue in Helsinki, Finland

- The Bad Bad Boy sculpture in Helsinki, Finland
- Medium: Concrete sculpture
- Location: Jätkäsaari, Helsinki, Finland
- 60°9′20.92″N 24°55′14.48″E

Bad Bad Boy is a pink sculpture made of concrete in Jätkäsaari, Helsinki, Finland. The sculpture was created by sculptor Tommi Toija and represents a naked urinating boy. The sculpture is 8.5 metres (28 ft) tall and weighs seven and a half tons. The water flow in the sculpture is heated so the boy can urinate all year round, even in winter. The sculpture was made of spray concrete around a steel frame and was made in Sweden.

== Location ==
The sculpture was originally ordered as part of the public art festival OpenArt in Örebro, Sweden, in summer 2013. There Bad Bad Boy urinated into a river in a park near the Örebro castle.

In August 2014 Bad Bad Boy was installed onto the Market Square in Helsinki where it urinated into the ocean in front of the Stora Enso headquarters and the Presidential Palace. At the time it was part of Tommi Toija's exhibition at the Amos Rex art museum during the Helsinki Festival. It became one of Helsinki's most photographed objects.

In February 2015 the sculpture was moved to Jätkäsaari onto the Tyynenmerenaukio square in front of the Verkkokauppa.com electronics store.

== See also ==
- List of depictions of urine in art
- Manneken Pis
