= METALmorphosis =

Kinetic sculpture by David Černý

METALmorphosis is a large (7 meters; weighing 13 tons) kinetic sculpture of a human head, by Czech artist David Černý. The sculpture is in the Whitehall Corporate Center in Charlotte, North Carolina, where it was inaugurated in 2007, and it sits in a large reflecting pool.

The piece is executed in polished stainless steel. The sculpture is made of 40 layers articulated into 7 pieces that can rotate individually. Originally, the sculpture could spout water from the head's mouth. A later and larger work, Head of Franz Kafka (Czech: Hlava Franze Kafky), a bust of Franz Kafka made of 45 tons of steel, is in Prague.
