= David Černý =

Czech artist (born 1967)

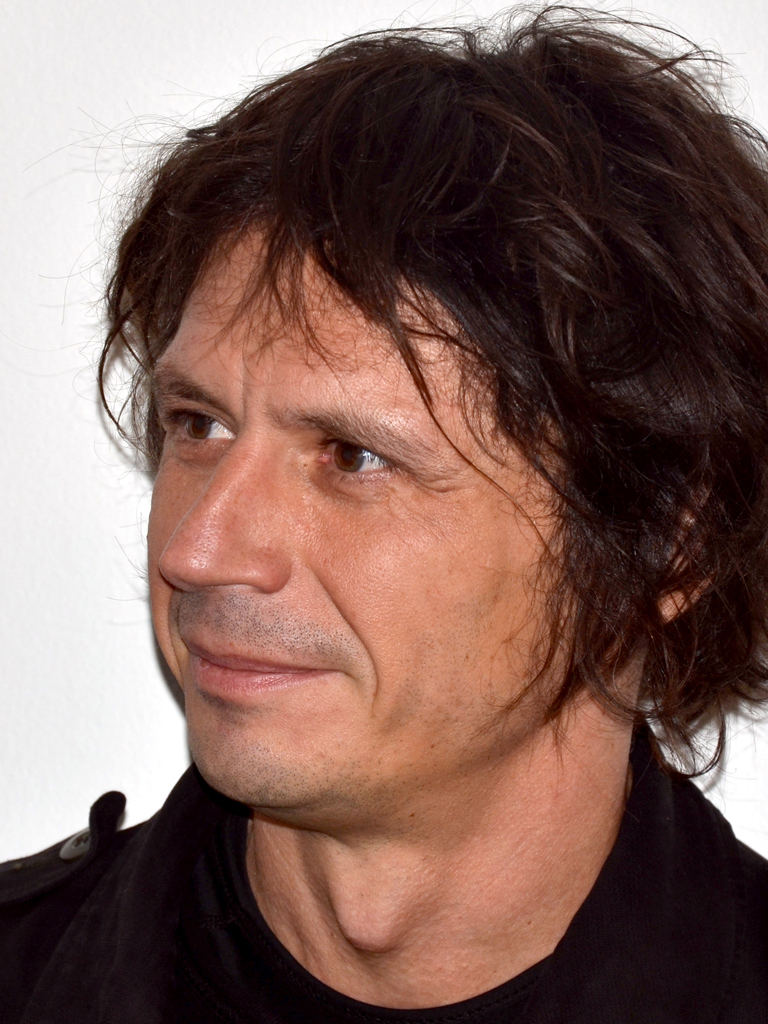
- Černý in 2013
- Born: 15 December 1967 (age 58); Prague, Czechoslovakia
- Occupation: Artist
- Awards: Jindřich Chalupecký Award (2000)
- Website: davidcerny.cz

David Černý (born 15 December 1967) is a Czech artist. His works can be seen in different locations around Prague as well as in his own, Prague-based museum, called Musoleum.

== Early life ==
Černý was born in Prague, Czechoslovakia. From 1988 to 1994, he studied at the Kurt Gebauer Studio at the Academy of Arts, Architecture and Design in Prague, and in 1995 and 1996, he participated in the Whitney Museum Independent Study Program in New York, US. In 1994–1995, he took the PSI artists residence in New York, and in 1996, he received a Pollock-Krasner Foundation grant. In 1991, he took a residency of the Swiss government in Boswil.

== Career ==
Černý gained notoriety in 1991 by painting pink a Soviet tank that served as a war memorial in central Prague. His act of civil disobedience was considered vandalism, and he was briefly arrested. Another of Černý's conspicuous contributions to Prague is Tower Babies (2000), a series of cast figures of crawling infants attached to Žižkov Television Tower.

In 2005 Černý created Shark, an image of Saddam Hussein in a tank of formaldehyde; the piece was presented at the second Prague Biennale that same year. Shark is a direct parody of the 1991 work The Physical Impossibility of Death in the Mind of Someone Living by Damien Hirst. In 2006 the piece was banned in Middelkerke, Belgium; in Bielsko-Biała, Poland; and also in the German town of Büdelsdorf. The mayor of Middelkerke, Michel Landuyt, admitted that he was worried that the exhibit could "shock people, including Muslims" in a year already marred by tensions associated with Danish cartoons depicting the prophet Mohammed.

The deputy mayor of Bielsko-Biała, Zbigniew Michniowski, contacted the city-funded gallery, galeria BWA, on 9 September 2006, and threatened dire consequences if the artwork was not removed promptly. In response, Shark was transported to the Szara Gallery, in the nearby town of Cieszyn. Its mayor, Bogdan Ficek, distanced himself from Bielsko-Biała's position, saying, "I cannot see any reason a politician should censor art". Later, Tatxo Benet added it to his Censored Art Collection. It was then displayed at the Museu de l'Art Prohibit in Barcelona, Spain, until its closure in July 2025.

Černý's statue METALmorphosis is on display in Charlotte, North Carolina. He created a similar outdoor sculpture in 2014, in Prague, called Head of Franz Kafka.

His Entropa, presented to mark the Czech presidency of the Council of the European Union during the first half of 2009, attracted controversy both for its stereotyped depictions of the various EU member states, and because it turned out to have been created by Černý and two friends rather than, as promised, being a collaboration between artists from each of the member states. Some EU member states reacted negatively to the depiction of their country. For instance, Bulgaria decided to summon the Czech ambassador to Sofia in order to discuss the illustration of the Balkan country as a collection of squat toilets. Meanwhile, the Bulgarian permanent representative to the EU allegedly said, "It is a humiliation for the Bulgarian nation and an offense to our national dignity." "

For the 2012 Summer Olympics, Černý created London Booster—a double-decker bus with mechanical arms for doing push-ups.

In April 2023, Černý opened his own gallery space, called Musoleum, in Prague's Smíchov district.

On 19 May 2024, two butterfly sculptures were installed on the facade of the Máj Národní building on Národní street in Prague. The artwork honors Czechoslovak fighter pilots who served in the Royal Air Force during World War II. In front of the building, 359 small fighter plane silhouettes, embedded in the pavement, symbolize the exact number of these pilots. The butterflies represent peace, while the Spitfire symbolizes war, highlighting the balance between the two. The installation was commissioned by AMADEUS Real Estate, which has owned the building since 2019, and precedes its reopening on 24 June 2024, after renovations.

== Awards ==
In 2000, Černý won the Jindřich Chalupecký Award.

== Gallery ==
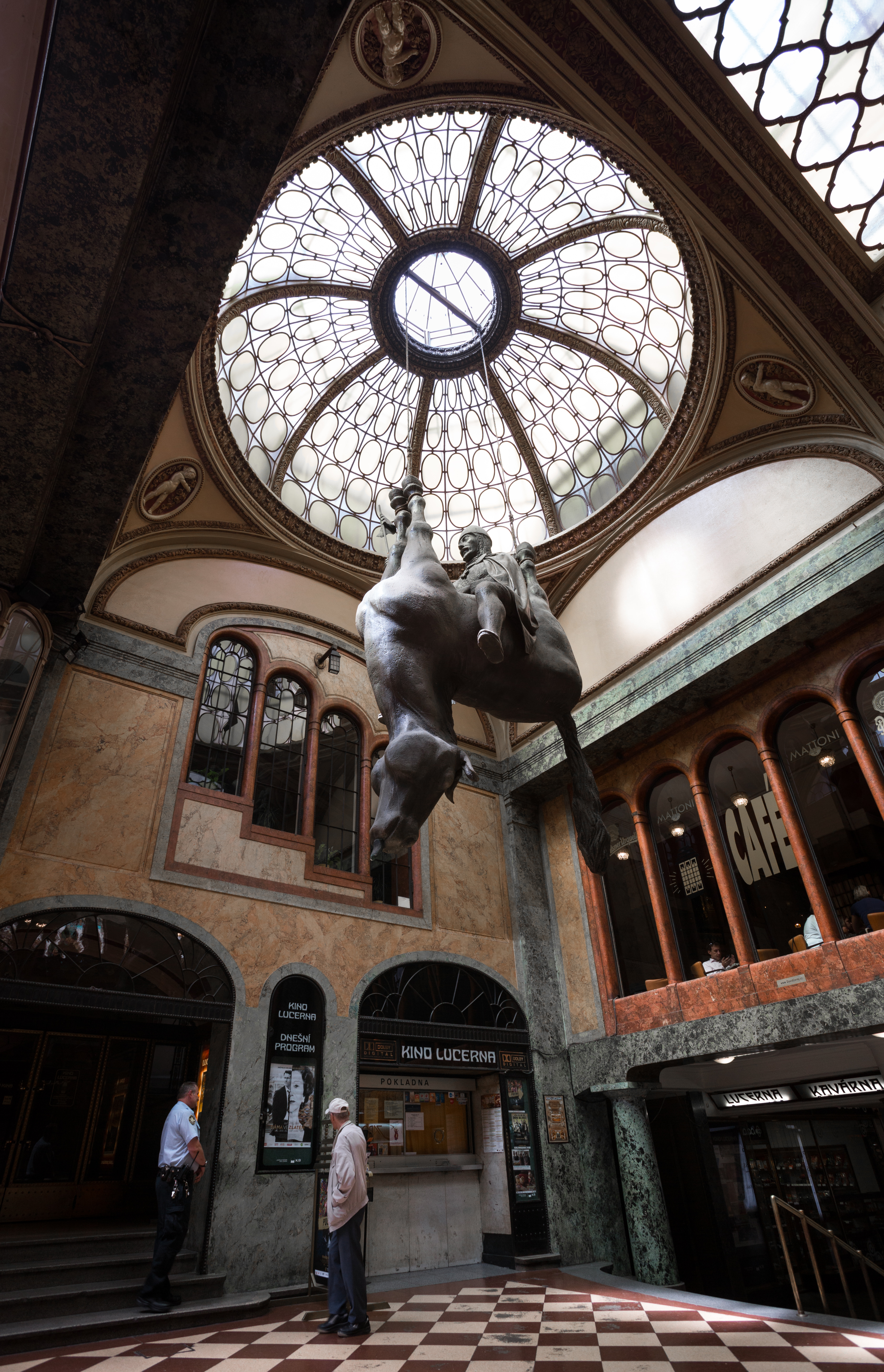
St. Wenceslas riding a dead horse. Cf. this statue by Josef Václav Myslbek.

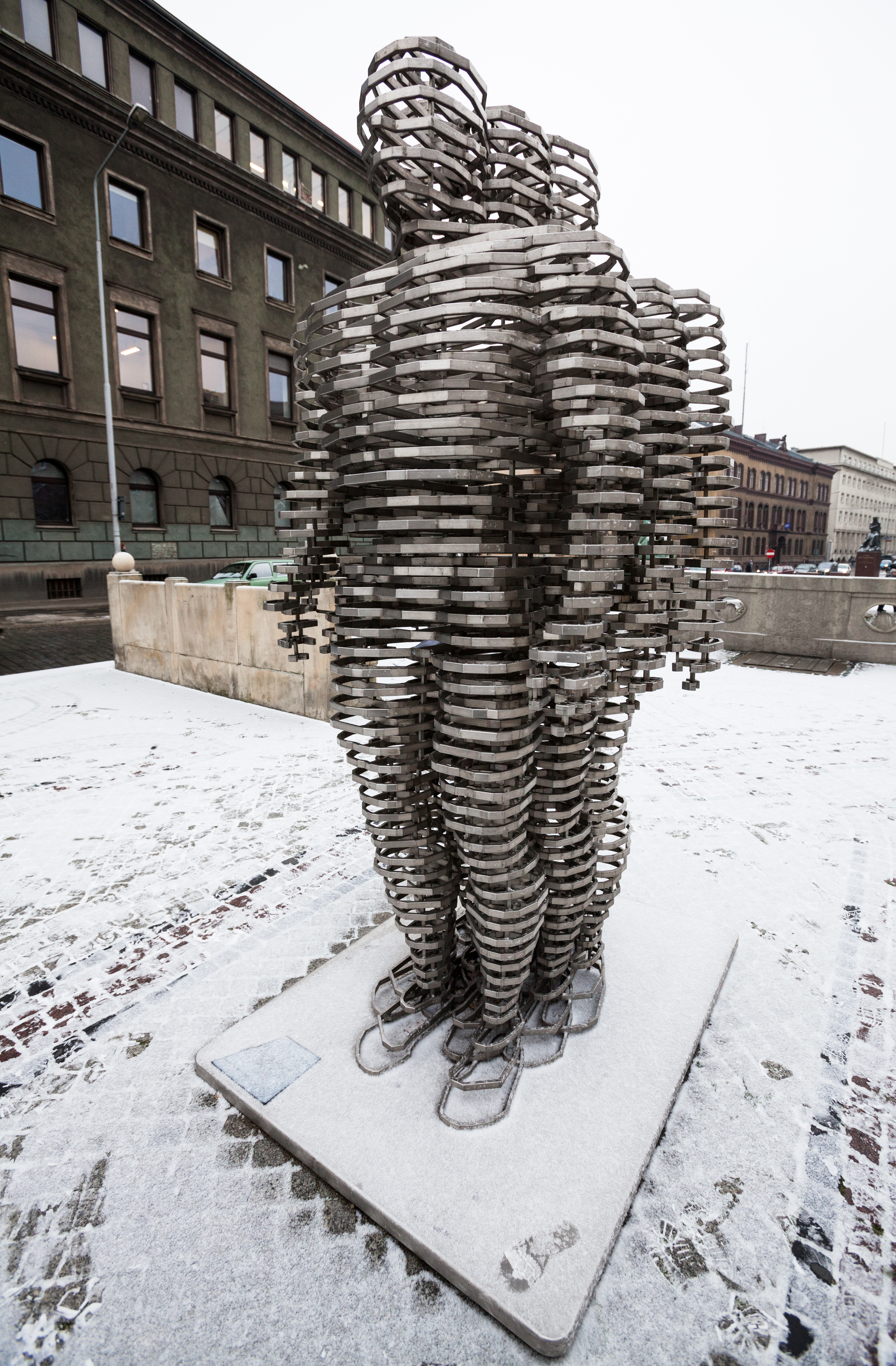
Golem, Poznań

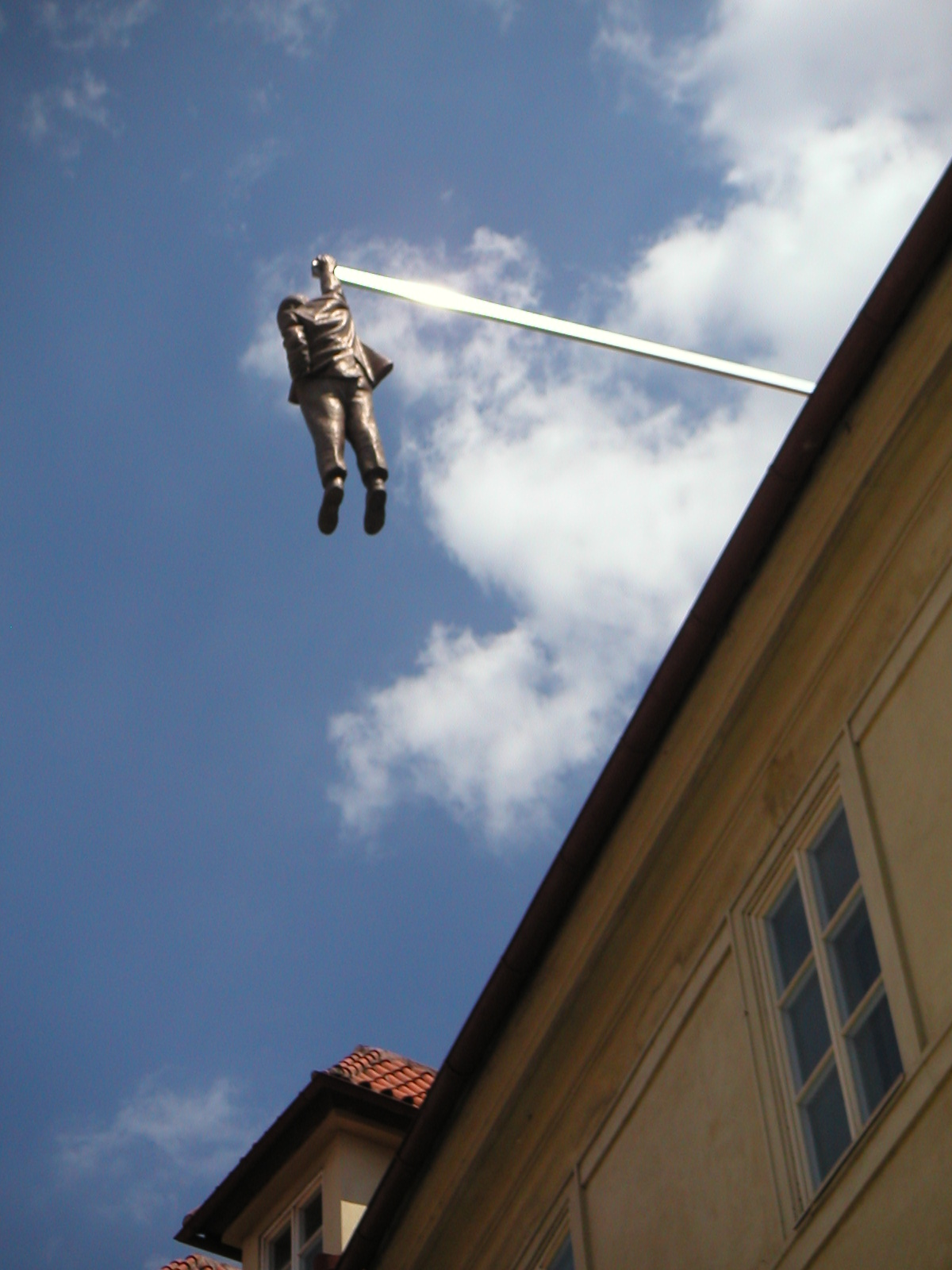
Statue of Sigmund Freud hanging by one hand

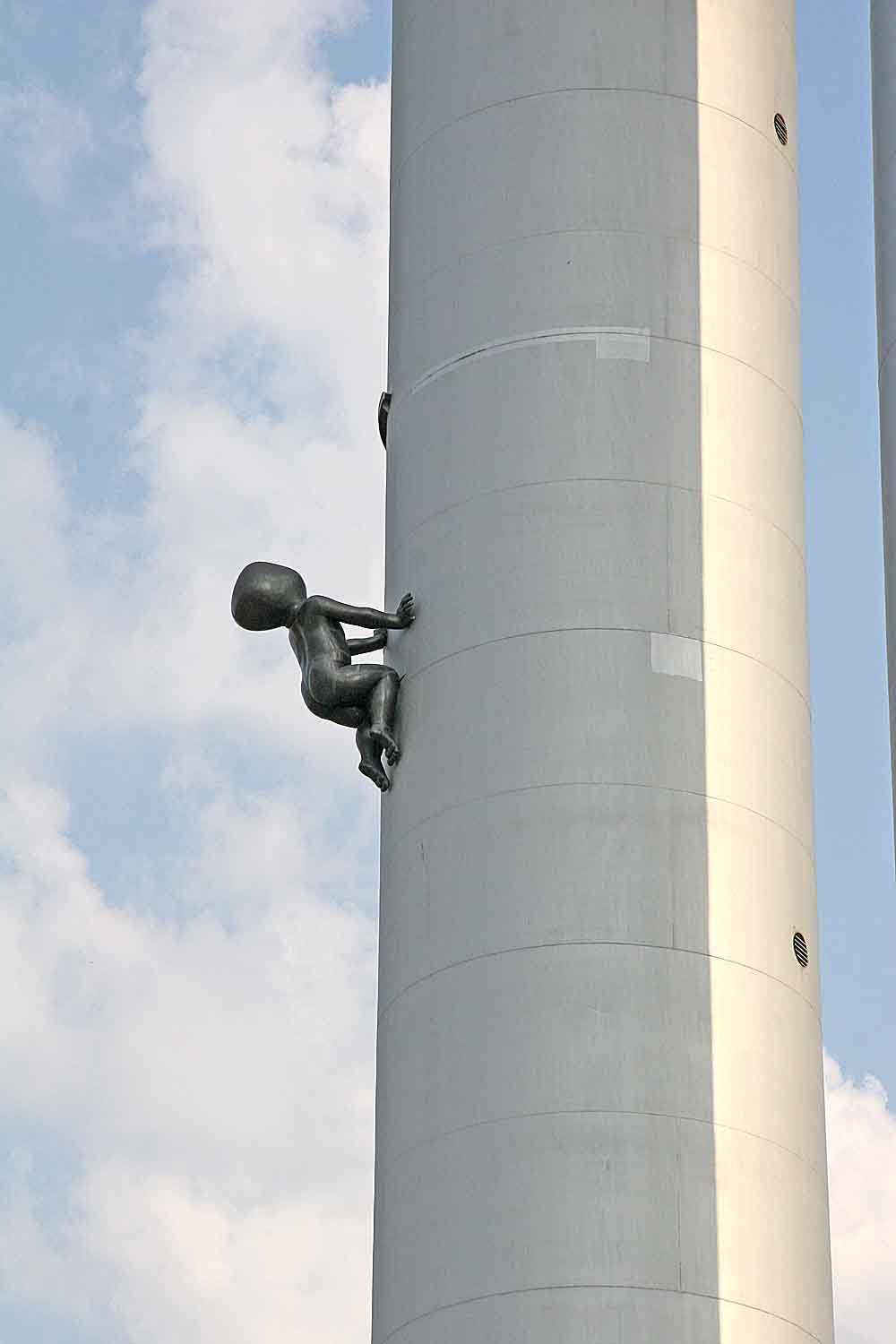
A "tower baby"

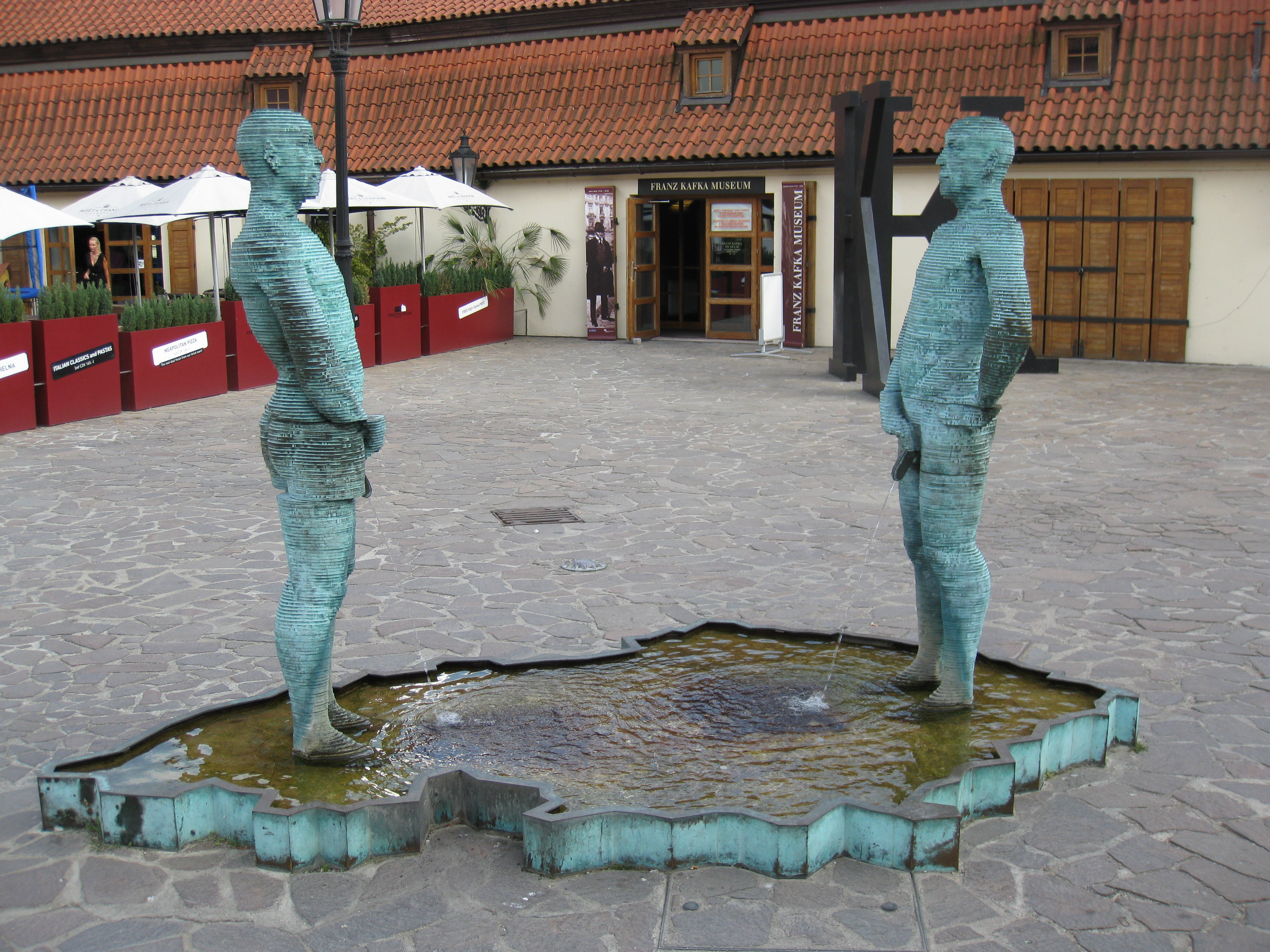
Piss (2004), Prague

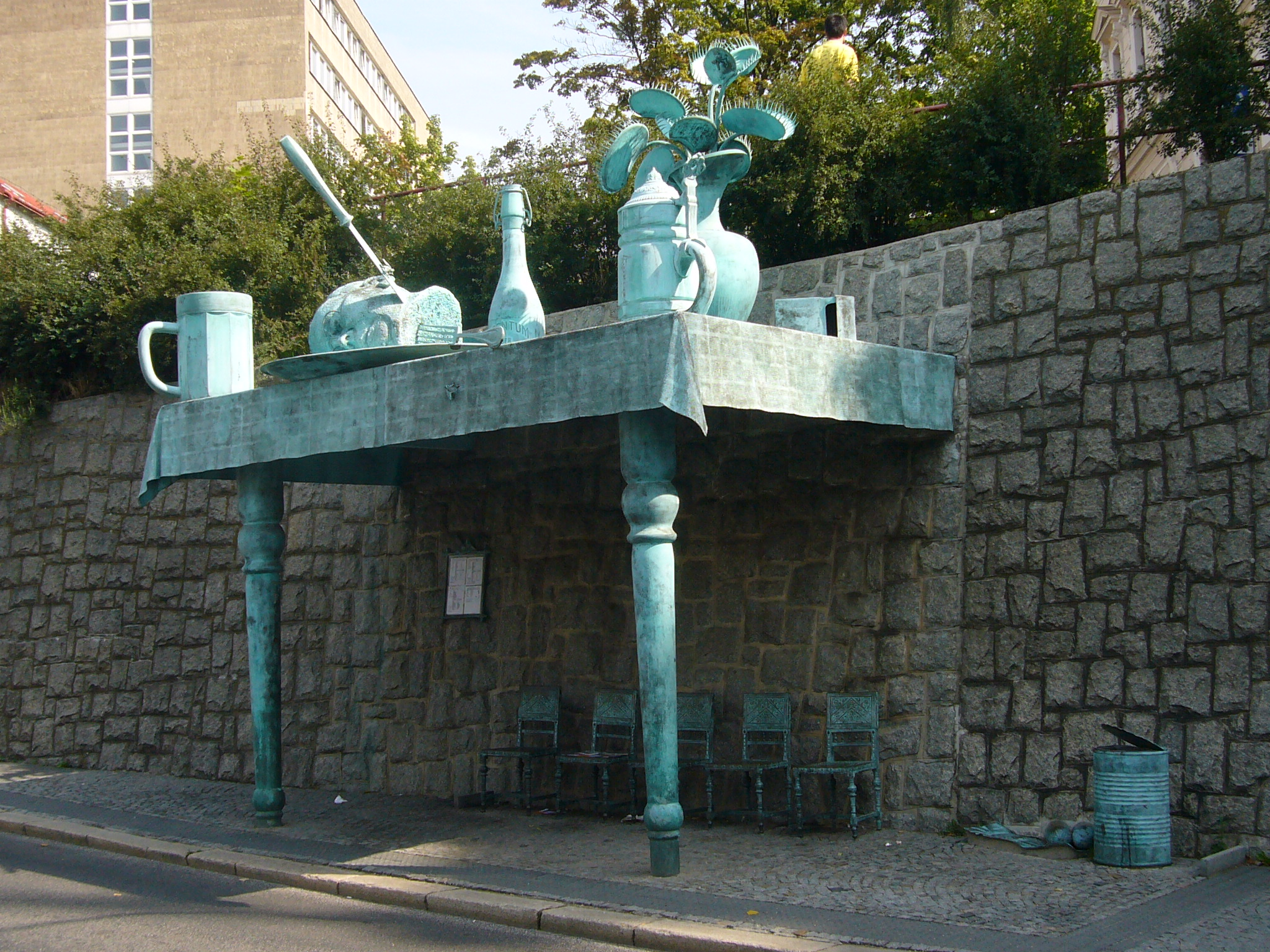
Feast of Giants, a bus stop in Liberec

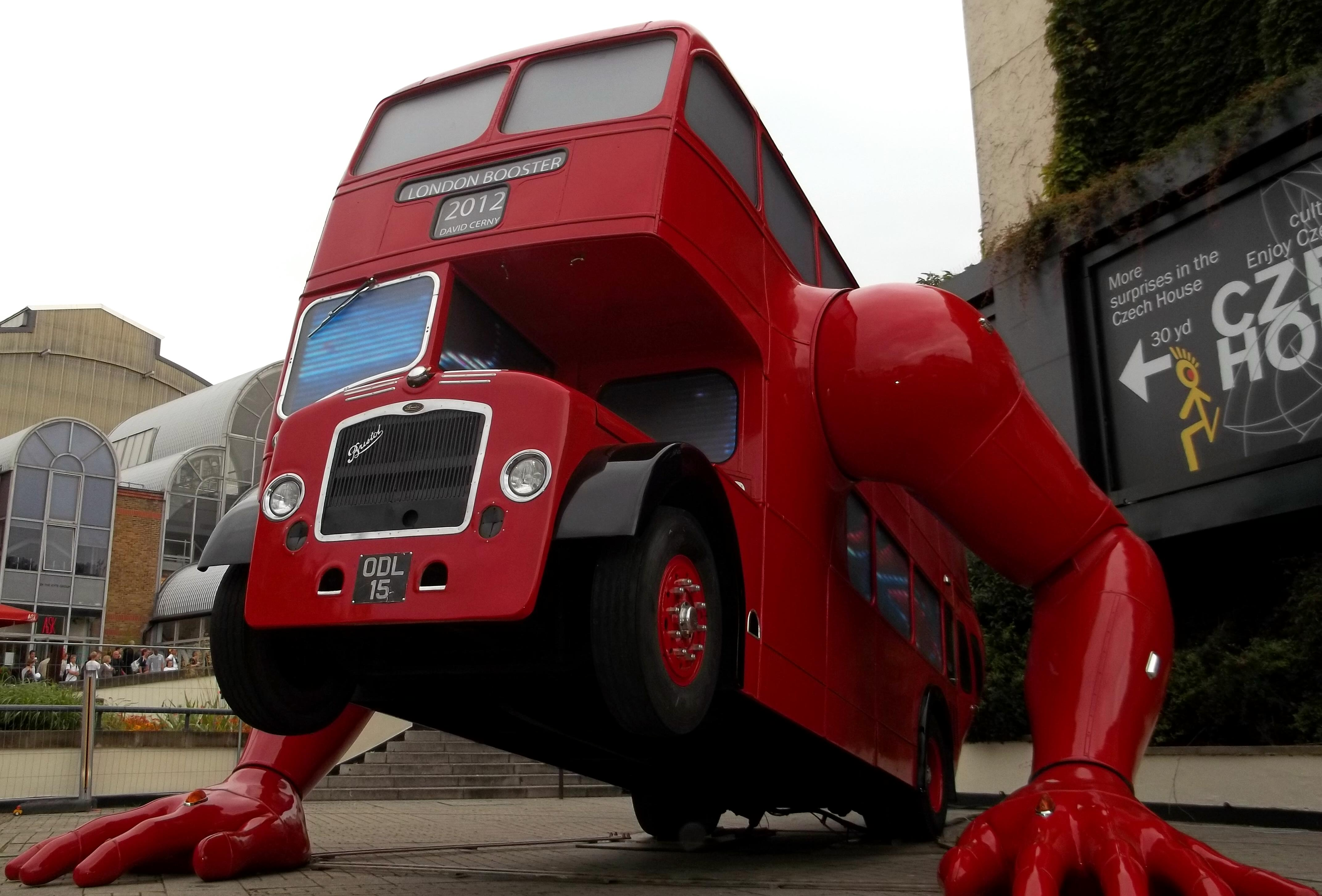
London Booster in front of Czech House in London

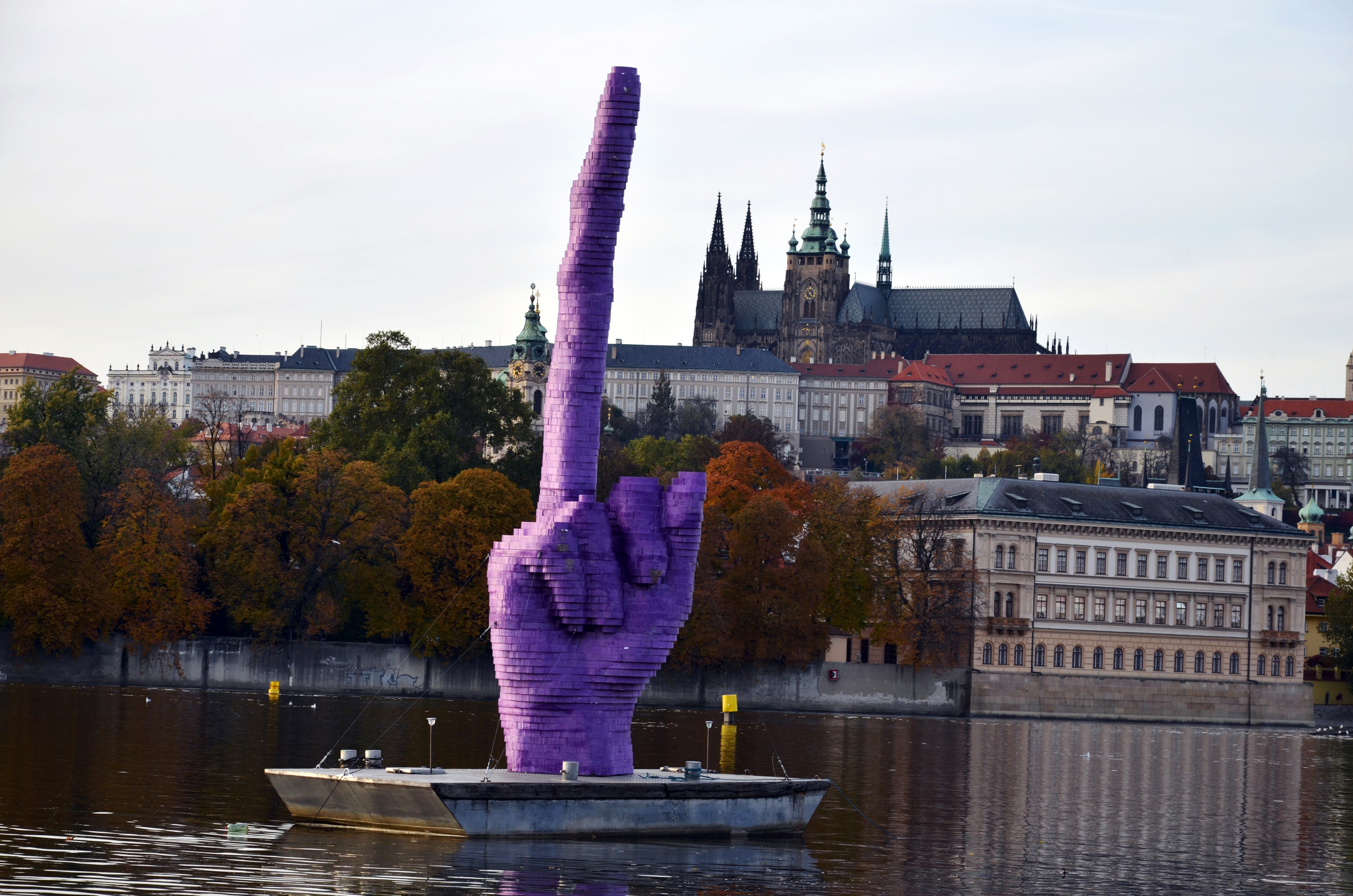
Gesture, Prague
