= Itō Hikozō =

Japanese painter (1904–2004)

- 伊藤 彦造
- Born: February 17, 1904; Ōita, Ōita Prefecture, Empire of Japan
- Died: September 9, 2004 (aged 100)

Itō Hikozō (Japanese: 伊藤 彦造; February 17, 1904 – September 9, 2004) was a Japanese painter and illustrator.

== Early life ==
Itō Hikozō was born in 1904 in the city of Ōita. He was allegedly a descendant of the famous medieval swordsman Itō Ittōsai.

In his youth, while working for The Asahi Shimbun, Hikozō learned the art of creative illustration from Migita Toshihide. After contracting tuberculosis, Hikozō returned home to convalesce. He later also studied painting under the guidance of Hashimoto Kansetsu.

== 1932 blood-portrait of Emperor Jinmu ==
In 1932, using an incision on his wrist as a palette and his own blood as pigment, Itō Hikozō painted a dramatic portrait of Emperor Jinmu. It was titled "An Illustration of Emperor Jinmu's Campaign to Conquer the East" (神武天皇御東征の図, Jinmu Tennō go-Tōsei no zu).

It was dedicated with the following statement: "On April 3ʳᵈ of the 2592ⁿᵈ year of the Empire, I, Itō Hikozō, with purified body and mind, present with awe this humble illustration, executed by brush in my own heart's blood, of the Holy Founding Emperor" (清く紀元の聖帝を仰慕し心血を彩管に淺いで謹写す、皇紀二千五百九十二年四月三日清心浄躯伊藤彦造).

The portrait was presented to Araki Sadao, acting Minister of the Army .

== After the war ==
Because he had produced artwork extolling legendary Imperial history and the samurai spirit, as well as hosting an Exhibition of Patriotic Paintings (愛国絵画展覧会, Aikoku Kaiga Tenrankai), Itō was arrested by the American occupation authorities after the surrender of Japan and charged with political war crimes. He was detained at Camp Zama. However, he was released after currying favor with the Americans by producing a number of Christian-themed paintings and eventually hosted Douglas MacArthur's family at his home.

Suffering from senile infirmity, he died in 2004.
