= Venus and Cupid (Lotto) =

Painting by Lorenzo Lotto

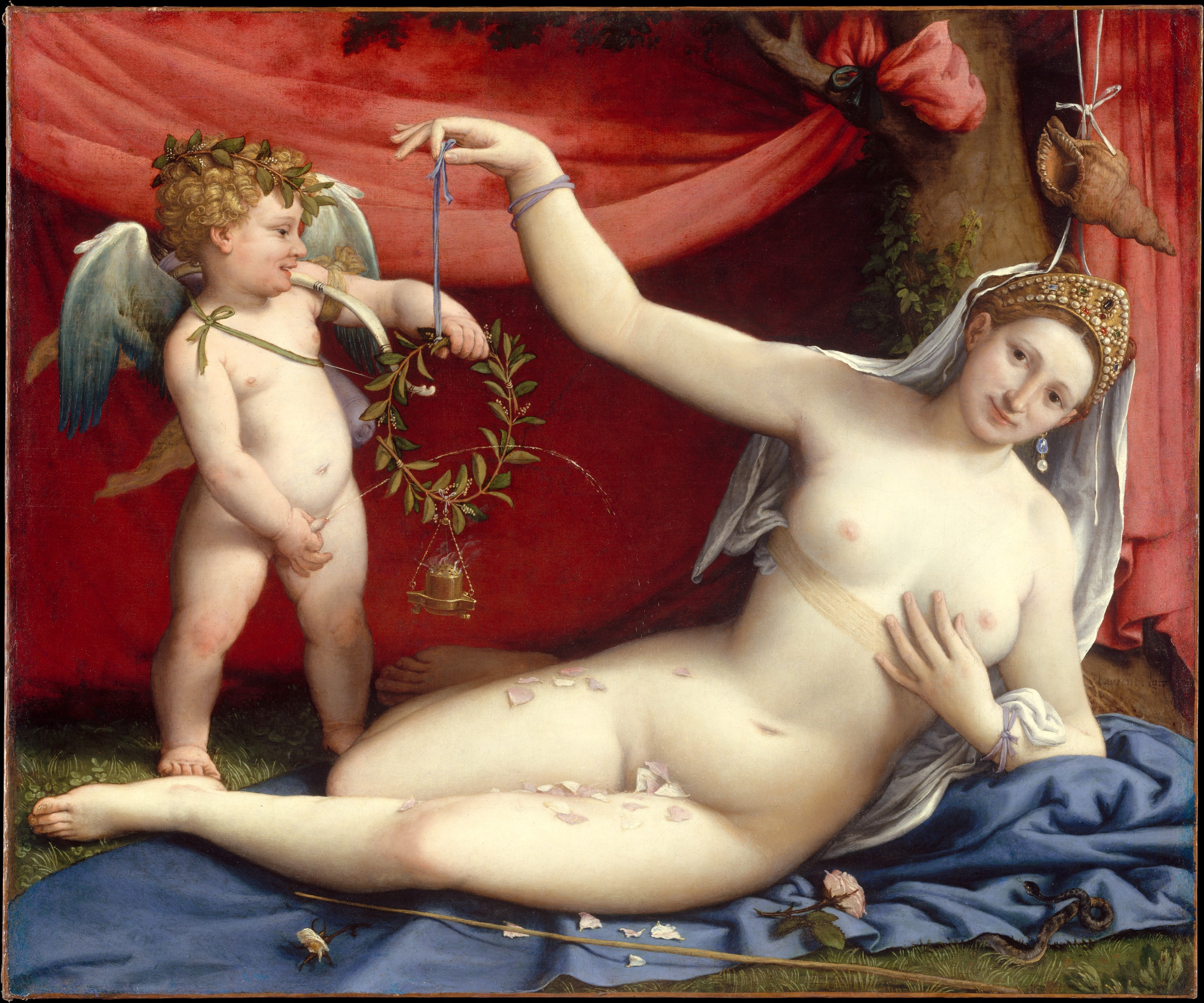
- Artist: Lorenzo Lotto
- Year: c. 1520s
- Medium: oil on canvas
- Dimensions: 92.4 cm × 111.4 cm (36.4 in × 43.9 in)
- Location: Metropolitan Museum of Art
- Accession: 1986.138
- Website: Metropolitan Museum of Art

Venus and Cupid is an oil-on-canvas painting by the Italian Renaissance artist Lorenzo Lotto in the collection of the Metropolitan Museum of Art. It has been dated to several periods, including the late 1530s and the early 1540s, but was probably created in the 1520s.

It is a wedding gift for a couple of Bergamo or Venice. Such paintings were inspired by the classical tradition of wedding poetry.

== Description ==
Venus, lying on the ground and leaning on an elbow on a blue cloth, is accompanied by her son Cupid standing with his bow and quiver. He urinates on the bride through a crown of laurels of myrtle which she holds by a ribbon and below which is suspended a burning incense burner. This urine stream is a symbolic act, the meaning of which is to bring fertility, and which would have seemed humorous to contemporary viewers.

A red cloth tied to a tree provides a background, and ivy climbs on the tree. Around Venus and Cupid are scattered allegorical objects of marriage (garland of myrtle), femininity (rose, seashell, rose petals), eternal love (ivy). The headdress of Venus, with the tiara, the veil and the earring, is typical of the Venetian brides of the sixteenth century. The pendant earring with a pearl is a symbol of purity. The gesture of Cupid urinating through the crown onto the belly of Venus is an allusion to fertility. The figure of a prepubescent boy in the act of urinating is a classical art motif known as a puer mingens, which was revived during the Renaissance.

The painting is Lotto's typically individual contribution to the emerging Venetian tradition of the reclining nude, begun by the Dresden Venus by Giorgione and Titian. The goddess shows no discomfort with her nakedness and looks the spectator in the eye. In front of her are a stick and a snake. The goddess seems to bless the marrying couple, wishing them fertility, and preserving them from hidden dangers like the serpent.

== History ==
Lotto painted Venus and Cupid while taking residence in Bergamo, settling there for a decade of his life to produce some of his most famous works including his San Bernardino Altarpiece.

This painting is not recorded until an image of it was published in the Directory of paintings of the Middle Ages and the Renaissance by Salomon Reinach in 1918, as being with a French dealer in 1912. It was discovered in a private Swiss collection by the English art dealer Adrian Ward-Jackson in 1986. It was bought by the Metropolitan Museum of Art in New York City in July 1986 for $3 million (equivalent to $8,811,475 in 2025) funded by Jayne Wrightsman in memory of Marietta Peabody Tree.

Before the purchase, the painting was cleaned at the Metropolitan, notably to remove an old overpainting that extended the headdress of Venus to drape onto her right thigh.

== Sources ==
- Roberta D'Adda, Lotto, Milan, Skira, coll. SkiraMiniArtBooks, 2010, 96 p. (ISBN 88-572-0098-1 OCLC 800131279)
