= Piss (Černý) =

Sculpture by David Černý in Prague, Czech Republic

- Čůrající postavy (Czech)
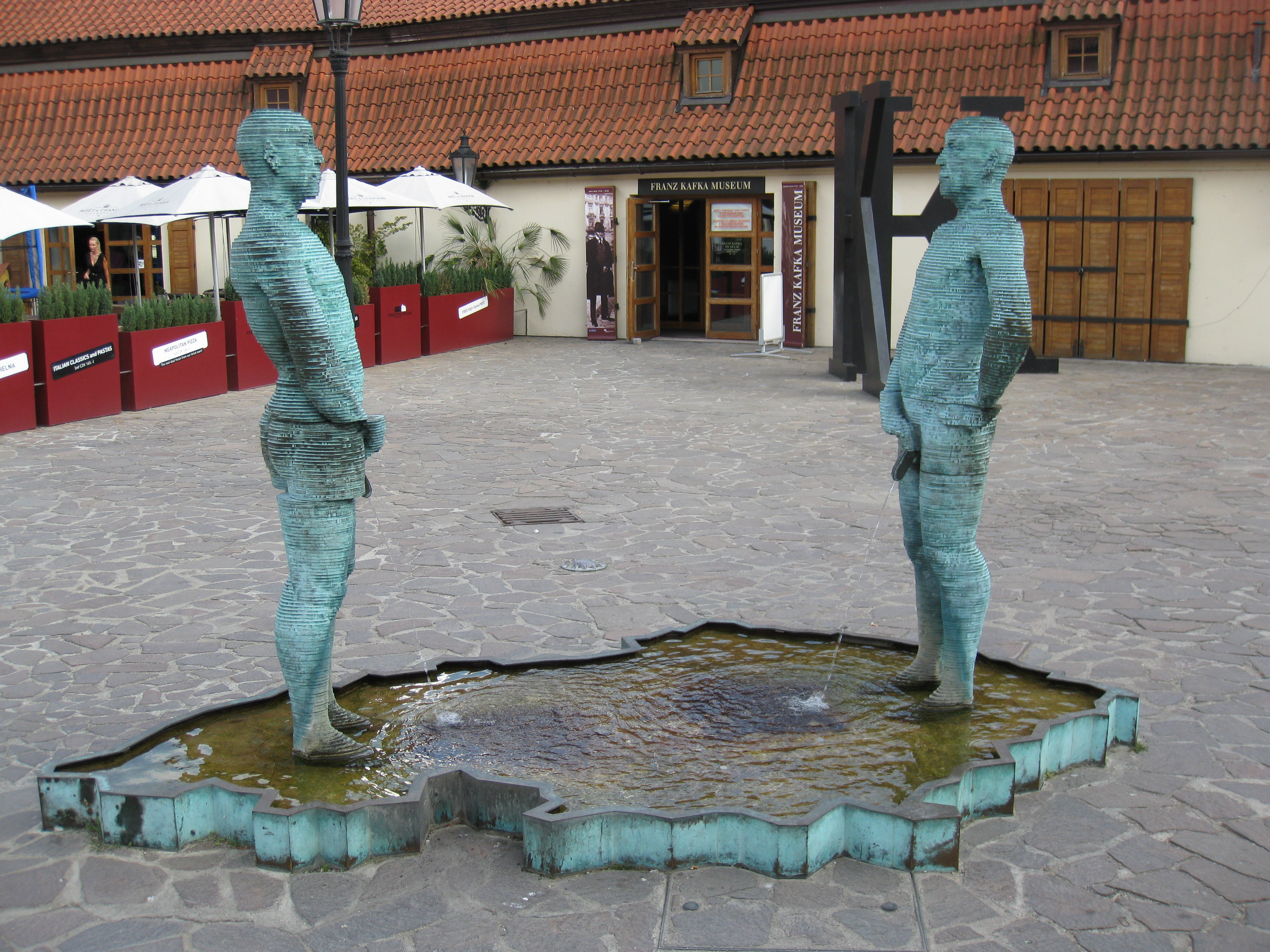
- The sculpture in 2009
- Artist: David Černý
- Year: 2004
- Dimensions: 210 cm (83 in)
- Location: Prague, Czech Republic; 50°5′17.14″N 14°24′36.88″E

Piss (Czech: Čůrající postavy, lit. 'Peeing characters') is an outdoor 2004 sculpture and fountain by Czech artist David Černý, installed outside the Franz Kafka Museum in Malá Strana, Prague, Czech Republic.

== Description ==
The fountain's basin is made of bronze and shaped like the Czech Republic. Standing in the fountain, opposite one another, are mechanical statues of men, standing 210 centimetres (6 ft 11 in) tall with bronze penises, urinating. Visitors to the area can command the men to write messages into the water via SMS.

== Reception ==
The Prague Post ranked Piss number one in their article, "Top 10 strangest statues in Prague", in which Ada von Kayser described the work as "both controversial and amusing".

== See also ==
- Kinetic art
- List of depictions of urine in art
