= Sarah Schönfeld =

German artist

Sarah Ancelle Schönfeld (born 1979 in Berlin) is a German artist.

== Life ==
Sarah Ancelle Schönfeld lives and works in Berlin. 1999–2005 studied fine arts at the Berlin University of the Arts (UdK) Berlin master student with Lothar Baumgarten. Based on the assumption that our Western-liberal understanding of the world is not sufficient to deal with the ever-accumulating global problem, Sarah Ancelle Schönfeld repeatedly designs various puzzling laboratories and treatments in which a wide variety of radically interdisciplinary methods are used to try solutions, healing and meaning to regenerate. Sarah Ancelle Schönfeld is mischievously looking for relevant updates to so-called folk wisdom. Her laboratories materialize in installations, performances, sculptures, instruments, photographs and collages. In her practice she incorporates approaches from various fields such as science, religion, mythology, magic and technology. She explores different modes of knowledge and truth production that constitute, control, and reproduce the human self and the arrangement called “reality” in our world. Her work has been shown in numerous solo and group exhibitions: e.g. Berghain/Boros Collection, Strasbourg Biennale, State Art Gallery Baden-Baden, MAK Vienna/Vienna Biennale.

== Works ==
=== Hero's Journey ===
Hero's Journey (Vitrine), is a 4 meter long glass vitrine filled with 1000 litres of human urine, lit by LEDs on both sides. The sculpture is the result of a collecting process, where visitors of the legendary techno nightclub Berghain in Berlin have been asked to contribute their urine. This work is a fluid travelogue and a liquid archeology of ecstasy, directly derived from the participating bodies. The title is referring to the motif of the classical monomyth by Joseph Campbell, the Hero's Journey.

After having been exhibited at Berghain in 2014 (in the exhibition „10“) and at the Staatliche Museen zu Berlin in 2017 (in the exhibition „Alchemie“) it will be exhibitable in a fluid form for another 5–10 years, due to the conservation additive Phenonip, used mainly for conservation of cosmetics. After this time span the collected liquid will be condensed in a controlled way into a crystal.

=== All You Can Feel ===
In the work All You Can Feel, liquified pharmaceuticals, synthetically produced body-own substances and illegal drugs have been placed on the sensitive side of a photographic negative. After a few days or weeks, the result of a chemical interaction between the photo-emulsion and the substance became visible, which was finally enlarged in the darkroom. By integrating the pharmaceuticals into the photographic process, they have been used as an alternative exposure method. The substances „hack“ the system of the negative by attacking its surface and getting deep into their structure and revealing themselves there as a kind of portrait. In All You Can Feel the possibilities of photography are explored at the frontiers of what can be visually portrayed – the interface between representation and reality.

== Exhibition ==
- 2014 10 Berghain, Berlin (group exhibition)
- 2017 Alchemie – Berlin State Museums, Berlin (group exhibition)
- 2018 Sarah Ancelle Schönfeld – Alien Linguistic Lab, Kunsthalle Baden-Baden (State Art Gallery), Baden-Baden

== See also ==
- Photography
- Drugs
- Computer Art
