= List of urban legends =

This is a list of urban legends. An urban legend or urban myth is a modern genre of folklore. It often consists of fictional stories associated with the macabre, superstitions, ghosts, demons, cryptids, extraterrestrials, creepypasta, and other fear generating narrative elements. Urban legends are often rooted in local history and popular culture.

== 0–9 ==
- The 27 Club is an urban legend that popular musicians and other celebrated artists die at age 27 with statistically anomalous frequency, notably, Jimi Hendrix, Brian Jones, Janis Joplin, Mia Zapata, Jim Morrison, Kurt Cobain, Jean-Michel Basquiat, Kim Jonghyun and Amy Winehouse. The claim of a "statistical spike" for the death of musicians at that age has been repeatedly disproven by studies.
- The 999 phone charging myth is an urban legend which claims that calling an emergency telephone number, then promptly hanging up, charges mobile phone batteries.
- The 1962 Halloween massacre was an urban legend about a photo of a Halloween costume party in 1962, in which seven people were reportedly killed.
- The 2016 clown sightings were urban legends that rose in popularity during 2016 about an individual or group dressed up as clowns who stalk, harass, or otherwise scare random people.

== A ==
- Aerial water bomber picking up scuba diver is an urban legend about an aerial water bomber, or a helicopter with a dangling water bucket, scooping up a scuba diver and dumping them on a wildfire site. This legend was used as a plot device in the films Magnolia and Barney's Version. The urban legend debunking site Snopes reports there are no proven cases of this happening in reality. The Discovery Channel show MythBusters also disproved the myth.
- Alexandria's Genesis is a purported genetic mutation that gives its carrier purple eyes, shimmering pale skin, a lack of body hair, and a lack of menstruation while still remaining fertile. The legend originated in a Daria fanfiction written in 1998, and since the 2000s has seen circulation on internet forums and social media.
- The Amityville Horror is an urban legend about a house in Amityville, NY becoming haunted after a murder. The legend has inspired numerous books and horror films.
- Anastasia Romanov's survival is a popular urban legend claiming that the Grand Duchess Anastasia Nikolaevna of Russia survived after her family was killed in 1918. The legend originated from the fact that Anastasia's remains were not buried with the corpses of her family. It remained a mystery for many years, until the truth was uncovered in 2007: Anastasia did not survive, but was in fact buried in a different place from her family.
- Annabelle (doll) is a Raggedy Ann doll that is claimed to be haunted. The doll is kept in a glass case at Warren Occult Museum in Monroe, Connecticut.
- The Ankle slicing car thief (or the man under the car) is an urban legend that tells of a driver that keeps hearing noises under their car when they are driving. When they step out of the car to investigate, their ankles get sliced open with a knife. While they are rolling around on the ground in pain, a car thief emerges from underneath the car and steals it.
- Area 51 is another name for a portion of the Nevada Test and Training Range that UFO enthusiasts have theorized contains evidence of visitors from outer space. There is disputed evidence for these claims.

== B ==
- Baby Train is an urban legend which claims that a small town had an unusually high birth rate because a train would pass through the town at 5:00 am and blow its whistle, waking up all the residents. Since it was too late to go back to sleep and too early to get up, couples would have sex. This resulted in the mini baby-boom.
- The babysitter and the man upstairs (also known as the babysitter or the sitter) is an urban legend dating back to the 1960s about a teenage girl babysitting children who receives telephone calls from a stalker who continually asks her to "check the children", all while secretly being in the same house as the babysitter.
- The Beast of Bladenboro (colloquially known as the Vampire Beast of Bladenboro or Vampire Cat) were a string of wildlife deaths caused by a reported big cat-like animal from the Winter of 1953–54, appearing in Bladenboro, North Carolina.
- The Beast of Bodmin Moor is a folklore legend that describes a phantom cat purported to live in Cornwall, England, United Kingdom. Bodmin Moor became a centre of purported sightings after 1978, with occasional reports of mutilated slain livestock; the alleged panther/leopard-like black cats of the same region came to be popularly known as the Beast of Bodmin Moor.
- The Beast of Exmoor (also known as the Exmoor Beast) is a folklore legend that describes a phantom cat said to roam the fields of Exmoor in Devon and Somerset in the United Kingdom.
- The Bell Witch is a folklore legend from 1817 to 1821, when farmer John Bell Sr., his family and the local area supposedly came under attack by a mostly invisible entity that was able to speak, affect the physical environment, and shapeshift, and was located in Robertson County, Tennessee.
- Bigfoot (also commonly referred to as Sasquatch) is a folklore legend that describes an ape-like creature that is purported to inhabit the forests of North America.
- Black Aggie is a folklore legend that describes a statue formerly placed on the grave of General Felix Agnus in Druid Ridge Cemetery in Pikesville, Maryland.
- The Black Angel is a folklore legend that describes a statue in Iowa City that is said to be cursed, based on the death of Teresa Feldevert.
- Black Annis (also known as Black Agnes or Black Anna) is a folklore legend that describes a blue-faced hag or witch with iron claws and a taste for human flesh (especially children).
- The Black Lady of Bradley Woods is a folklore legend that describes a ghost which reportedly haunts the woods near the village of Bradley, Lincolnshire, England.
- Black Volga refers to a black Volga limousine that was allegedly used to abduct people in Eastern Europe, especially children.
- Black-eyed children (or black-eyed kids) are an urban legend of supposed paranormal creatures that resemble children between the ages of 6 and 16, with pale skin and black eyes, who are reportedly seen hitchhiking or panhandling, or are encountered on doorsteps of residential homes. Tales of black-eyed children have appeared in pop culture since the late 1990s.
- Bloody Mary is a folklore legend consisting of a ghost or spirit conjured to reveal the future. She is said to appear in a mirror when her name is called multiple times. The Bloody Mary apparition may be benign or malevolent, depending on historic variations of the legend. The Bloody Mary appearances are mostly "witnessed" in group participation games.
- The Blue star tattoo legend refers to a modern legend that LSD tabs are being distributed as lick-and-stick temporary tattoos to children.
- The Brown Lady of Raynham Hall is a folklore legend that describes a ghost that reportedly haunts Raynham Hall in Norfolk, England.
- Mercy Brown is a folklore legend based on the exhumation of a young woman from Exeter, Rhode Island, who died from tuberculosis.
- Bunny Man is an urban legend that probably originated from two incidents in Fairfax County, Virginia, in 1970, but has been spread throughout the Washington, D.C. area. There are many variations to the legend, but most involve a man or ghost wearing a rabbit costume ("bunny suit") who attacks people with an axe.
- The Bogeyman is a ubiquitous folklore figure and "umbrella" urban legend used globally to frighten children into behaving, typically lurking under beds or in closets to kidnap or eat disobedient kids.

== C ==
- Cadborosaurus (nicknamed Caddy) is a sea serpent in the folklore of regions of the Pacific Coast of North America; its name is partly derived from Cadboro Bay in Greater Victoria, British Columbia.
- Carmen Winstead (also known as Jessica Smith) is a chain letter that describes the story of a girl who was pushed down a sewer drain.
- Castilian lisp is an urban legend claiming that the prevalence of the sound /θ/ in European Spanish can be traced back to a Spanish king who spoke with a lisp, and whose pronunciation spread by prestige borrowing to the rest of the population. This myth has been discredited by scholars for lack of evidence.
- The Catman of Greenock is an urban legend originating in the 1970s surrounding a homeless man in Greenock, Scotland who eats rats with his hands. He earned the name 'Catman', due to rumours that he lived with and cared for a group of wild cats.
- The Celebrity Death Rule of Threes is a superstition that movie stars, celebrities, and politicians die in groups of three.
- The Choking Doberman is an urban legend that originated in the United States. The story involves a protective pet found by its owner gagging on human fingers lodged in its throat. As the story unfolds, the dog's owner discovers an intruder whose hand is bleeding from the dog bite.
- The Colander lie detector, a story originating in the 1960s about a group of police or army investigators who would hook up a colander to a photocopier, and then place it on a suspect's head. Should the suspect give an answer the investigators found unreliable, they would make the photo-copier print paper out that said "he's lying".
- The chupacabra (Spanish pronunciation: [tʃupaˈkaβɾa], from chupar "to suck" and cabra "goat", literally "goat sucker") is a legendary cryptid rumored to inhabit parts of the Americas, with the first sightings reported in Puerto Rico. The name comes from the animal's reported habit of attacking and drinking the blood of livestock, especially goats.
- Clara Crane (also known as the Candy Lady) is an urban legend thought to be the inspiration behind an actual missing children case in Terrell, Texas.
- The Clown doll (also known as the Clown statue) is an urban legend somewhat based on "the babysitter and the man upstairs" legend, due to the similar concept of a babysitter being attacked by an intruder (here being a murderer disguised as an inanimate clown doll).
- Eunice Cole (better known as Goody Cole) was blamed for numerous local tragedies and accused of witchcraft twice in Brentwood, New Hampshire in 1656 and again in 1673.
- The corpse light is an urban legend that describes a symbol of false comfort, a phantom light located in Cape Henlopen State Park.
- Cow tipping is the purported activity of sneaking up on any unsuspecting or sleeping upright cow and pushing it over for entertainment, supposedly popular in rural farming communities.
- Cropsey is a folklore legend that describes a boogeyman-like figure, before segueing into the story of Andre Rand, a convicted child kidnapper from Staten Island through the 1970s–80s.
- Crybaby Bridge is a nickname given to some bridges in the United States. The name often reflects the belief that the sound of a baby can be, or has been, heard from the bridge.
- The Crying Boy is a mass-produced print of an allegedly cursed painting by Italian painter Giovanni Bragolin. This was the pen-name of the painter Bruno Amadio. It was widely distributed from the 1950s onwards.
- The Cucuy is a folklore legend that describes a mythical ghost-monster, malevolent and equivalent to the bogeyman of Latin American countries.
- The curse of the Bambino was a superstition evolving from the failure of the Boston Red Sox baseball team to win the World Series in the 86-year period from 1918 to 2004. While some fans took the curse seriously, most used the expression in a tongue-in-cheek manner.
- The cursed memorial of Jonathan Buck is an obelisk featuring a stain in the shape of a woman's boot or stocking-clad foot located in Bucksport Cemetery, Maine.

== D ==
- The Dark Watchers (also known by early Spanish settlers as Los Vigilantes Oscuros) is a legend from Santa Lucia Range, California concerning a group of large, silhouette-like entities reported to have observed travelers from a distance.
- The Dead children's playground is located in Maple Hill Park, Alabama. This urban legend is about how many children lost their lives in Huntsville, during the Spanish Flu Pandemic of 1918. Most of them were buried in Maple Hill Cemetery, alongside a playground.
- The Death Number 999-9999 is an urban legend claiming that if someone calls 999–9999 after midnight, they will be able to request anything they wish, but at the cost of their death. The legend was adapted into a horror movie, 999-9999, in 2002.
- The Death ship of the Platte River (or the ghost ship of the Platte River) is an urban legend about an old sailing ship that appears grey and unnatural, crewed by phantom sailors, sighted between Alcova and Torrington, Wyoming since the mid-1800s.
- The Death of James Dean in a car accident spawned many urban legends related to his Porsche 550 nicknamed "Little Bastard". The most common one (often described as a "curse") states that any individual who took a part from Dean's car after the accident later died in an accident of their own. Other stories include the wreck itself being involved in accidents causing loss of life or heavy destruction of property and its unexplained disappearance in 1960.
- The Devil's chair (or haunted chair) is a folklore legend that describes a class of funerary or memorial sculpture common in the United States during the 19th century.
- The Devil's Footprints (or the Devon Devil) was a phenomenon that occurred during February 1855 around the Exe Estuary in East and South Devon, England.
- The Devil's Tramping Ground is a camping spot located in a forest near the Harper's Crossroads area in Bear Creek, North Carolina.
- Doveland, Wisconsin is an urban legend about a Wisconsin town called Doveland that according to the legend, disappeared entirely in the 1990s, with many people saying they remember the town yet it does not exist.
- The Dover Demon is a creature reportedly sighted in the town of Dover, Massachusetts on 21 and 22 April 1977.
- Dudleytown is an abandoned settlement in Connecticut in the United States, best known today as a ghost town. Due to vandalism and trespassers, the site is not open to the public.
- The Dybbuk box (or the Dibbuk box) is a folklore legend that describes a wine cabinet claimed to be haunted by a dybbuk, a concept from Jewish mythology.

== E ==
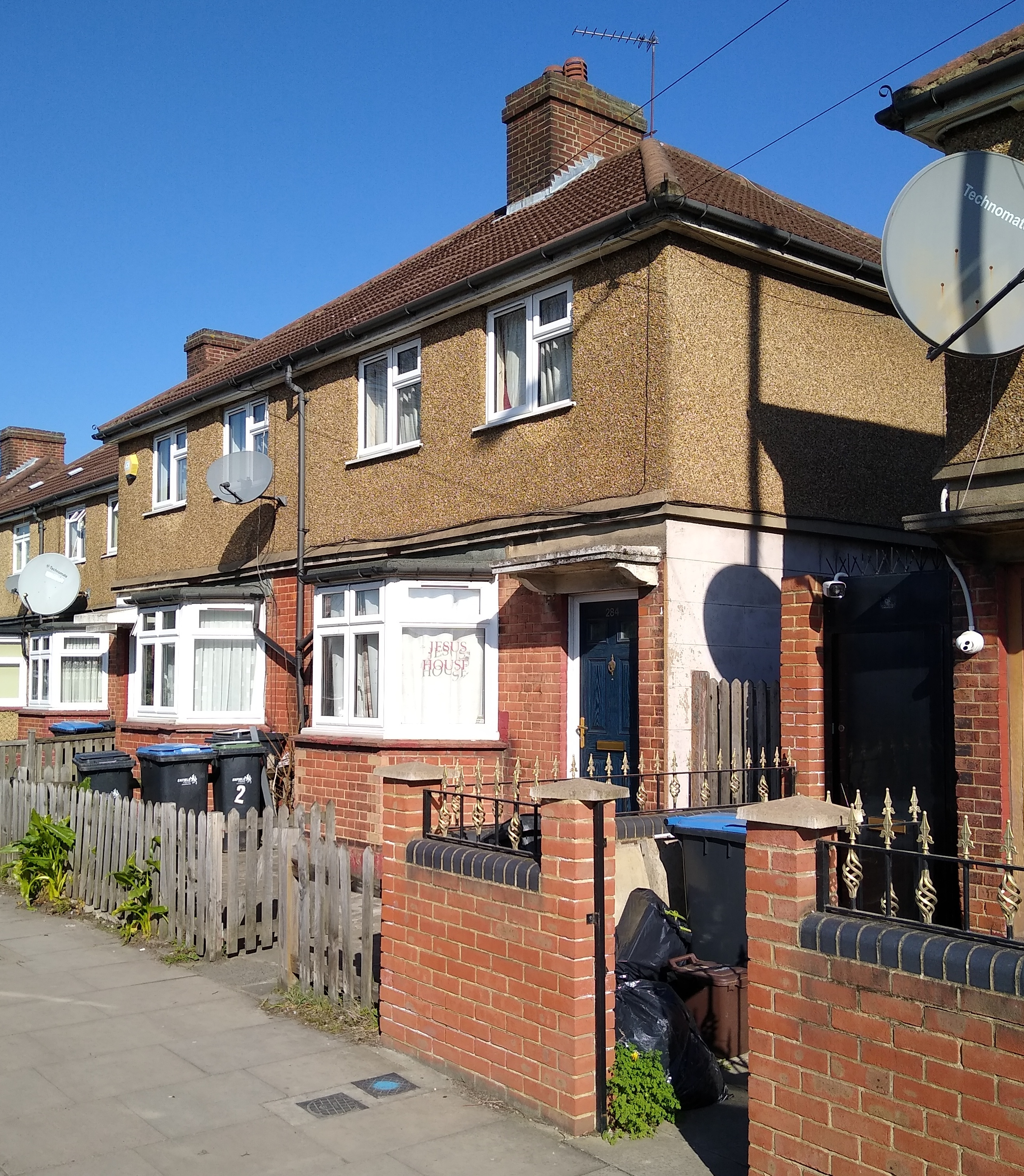
284 Green Street, the supposed home of the Enfield poltergeist

- The Enfield poltergeist was a claim of supernatural activity at 284 Green Street, a council house in Brimsdown, Enfield, London, England, between 1977 and 1979 involving two sisters, aged 11 and 13.
- The Elevator Game is a ritual that purportedly sends the participant to an alternate world if done correctly, and involves a mysterious woman that may enter the elevator with them. The legend is said to date back to 2008 on the Japanese website 2channel.
- The Emo's Grave legend is a ritual involving the mausoleum of brewer Jacob Moritz in the Salt Lake City Cemetery, located in Utah. Participants claim that circling the tomb while chanting "Emo" causes glowing red eyes or a ghostly face to appear behind the iron grate. Historically, the tomb held Moritz's ashes until they were removed by his family due to persistent vandalism.
- The Escalante Petrified Forest curse is a claim that those who remove petrified wood from the Escalante Petrified Forest State Park in Utah will be struck by a series of misfortunes, ranging from financial ruin to physical injury. The park receives dozens of packages annually containing stolen wood and apology letters from people seeking to break the purported curse.

== F ==
- Fair Charlotte is a legend of how a foolish New England girl froze to death during a sleigh ride to a New Years ball because she was too vain to put warm clothing over her silk dress. The source was an 1838 morality tale of a vain girl who froze to death in London.
- Fan death is the purported phenomenon of people dying supposedly as a result of an electric fan running in a closed, windowless room. Originating in South Korea during the 1920s and 1930s, the myth had persisted in the country (and to a much smaller extent, Japan) well into the early 21st century, with the most recent example of its continuation into the public consciousness being a 4 July 2011, edition of The Korea Herald claiming that a 59-year-old man had died while sleeping, with a fan directly pointed at him.
- According to local legend the Fire Island Lighthouse is said to be haunted by the ghost of a lighthouse keeper who committed suicide in the tower after his daughter got sick and died before help could arrive. The legend has attracted paranormal investigators in recent years.
- The Flatwoods monster (also known as the Braxton County monster, phantom of Flatwoods, or "Braxxy") is an alien entity reported to have been sighted in the town of Flatwoods in Braxton County, West Virginia, United States, on 12 September 1952, after a bright object crossed the night sky.
- The Floating Coffin of Charles Coghlan, who died 27 November 1899; his coffin was placed in a vault of Lakeview Cemetery, Galveston, Texas. During the Galveston Hurricane of 1900, his coffin was washed out to sea. A 1929 Ripley's Believe It or Not! cartoon claimed that the coffin was washed ashore on Prince Edward Island, Canada. In fact, Coghlan's coffin/remains was eventually found in January 1907 by a group of hunters who discovered it partially submerged in a marsh some nine miles from Galveston along the east coast of mainland Texas. The 1907 news reports of the recovery of his coffin/remains do not tell of the disposition of his remains; he was certainly not reburied on Prince Edward Island.
- The Fouke Monster (also known as the Boggy Creek Monster and the Swamp Stalker) is a folklore legend that describes an ape-like creature, similar to descriptions of Bigfoot, that was allegedly sighted in the rural town of Fouke, Arkansas during the early 1970s.
- The Frozen Hill people (or the deep frozen old folks) was a folklore legend that describes an extremely poor family of hill farmers isolated in Bridgewater Corners, Vermont since 21 December 1887. The legend describes the family freezing its old and infirm members solid during the winter, and thawing and resuscitating them in the spring.
- The Fresno nightcrawlers are cryptids first spotted in Fresno, California on CCTV footage. They appear to be white, long-legged creatures, compared to "walking pairs of pants".

== G ==
- The gateway to Hell is an urban legend and located in the Stull Cemetery, Kansas, the stairs in an old demolished church open to the other side on Halloween and the spring equinox.
- The ghost boy of Clinton Road is an urban legend that describes a dead young boy who hangs out under a bridge and returns coins to you after you throw them in the water.
- The Ghost of Kyiv is an urban legend of a Ukrainian fighter ace defending Kyiv during the 2022 Russian invasion of Ukraine.
- Goatman is a folklore legend that describes a creature resembling a goat-human hybrid often credited with canine deaths and purported to take refuge in the woods of Beltsville, Maryland.
- The Great South Bay Giant Horseshoe Crab is an urban legend about a new cryptid species of giant eight foot long horseshoe crabs inhabiting the waters off the south shore of Long Island, NY.
- The Green children of Woolpit were two children of unusual skin colour who reportedly appeared in the village of Woolpit in Suffolk, England, some time in the 12th century, perhaps during the reign of King Stephen.
- The Green Clawed Beast is a green-clawed humanoid beast lurking in the Ohio River purported to have attacked unsuspecting women in the city of Evansville, Indiana since 14 August 1955.

== H ==
- Hanako-san is a Japanese urban legend of the spirit of a young girl who haunts school bathrooms, and can be described as a yōkai or a yūrei. To summon her, individuals must enter a girls' bathroom (usually on the third floor of a school), knock three times on the third stall, and ask if Hanako-san is present.
- The Hands Resist Him is a painting that was created by artist Bill Stoneham in 1972. It depicts a young boy and a female doll standing in front of a glass paneled door, against which many hands are pressed. There is a myth that the characters in the painting move during the night and sometimes leave the painting.
- The Hanging Man of Halloween was a 42-year-old woman who hanged herself in a tree along a busy road in Frederica, Delaware.
- The Hanging Munchkin is a small shadowed figure seen during the film The Wizard of Oz, purportedly an actor (portraying a Munchkin) caught in the act of committing suicide. Snopes.com finds no evidence of any such death, and instead identifies the figure as one of several large birds allowed to roam the set.
- Haunchyville is an urban legend that describes a mythical village of dwarves in Waukesha County, Wisconsin, United States. It is rumored to be located near Mystic Drive in Muskego.
- The Hat Man is an urban legend based around a humanoid shadow person who appears after someone takes too much medicine, particularly Benadryl. He is described as a tall, dark silhouette with the outline of a trench coat and a fedora. The legend was popularized on TikTok.
- Headless Rider is a Japanese urban legend about a motorcycle rider whose head was cut off by piano wire when he crashed into it at high speed.
- The Haunted Pillar (or the Cursed Pillar) was a landmark left standing near the remains of a farmer's market that once stood at 5th and Broad Streets in downtown Augusta, Georgia.
- The Highgate Vampire was a media sensation surrounding reported sightings of a vampire and other supernatural phenomena at Highgate Cemetery in London during the late 1960s and early 1970s.
- Hippo eats dwarf is an internet-spread urban legend about a circus performer being accidentally swallowed by a hippopotamus.
- HMS Friday is an urban myth concerning a disastrous attempt by the Royal Navy to dispel the superstition against sailing on a Friday.
- The hodag (or the Rhinelander hodag) was a fearsome critter resembling a large bull-horned carnivore with a row of thick curved spines down its back. The hodag was said to be born from the ashes of cremated oxen as the incarnation of the accumulation of abuse the animals had suffered at the hands of their masters in the city of Rhinelander, Wisconsin.
- Homey the Clown was an urban legend (specifically in Chicago) surrounding a killer clown, predating the "2016 clown sightings" by several years, originating in Chicago, Illinois in 1991.
- The Honey Island Swamp monster is a Sasquatch-like creature that can allegedly be found living in the Honey Island Swamp of Louisiana.
- The Hone-onna (or the 骨ほね女おんな;lit;bone woman) is a female Yōkai that rises from her grave, maintaining the appearance of a beautiful woman to cavort with her lover in life.
- The Hook, also called Hookman, is a highly famous urban legend revolving around a deranged murderer with a hook prosthesis in place of a hand escaping from a mental asylum and terrorizing a teenage couple while parked at a lover's lane. Originating in the post-war United States during the 1950s and 60s, it has been theorized by some folklorists and writers that may have been based (although loosely) on actual events, such as the Texarkana Moonlight murders in 1946.
- The Hopkinsville goblins (or the Kentucky goblins) was a supposed extraterrestrial visit by small, goblin-like, green "hairless children" with three toes in Hopkinsville, Kentucky.
- A Huelga a la japonesa is an urban legend in Spanish-speaking countries. Based on the notion that Japanese workers work extremely hard, the legend says that workers can and sometimes do exert pressure by working harder.
- The hundredth monkey effect is a hypothetical phenomenon in which a new behavior or idea is spread rapidly by unexplained means from one group to all related groups once a critical number of members of one group exhibit the new behavior or acknowledge the new idea.

== I ==
- The Ilkley Moor UFO incident was a supposed extraterrestrial sighting by a retired police officer in the moorland of West Yorkshire, England on 1 December 1987.
- "In the Air Tonight" is a song by Phil Collins that is allegedly about a drowning incident in which someone who was close enough to save the victim did not help them, while Collins, who was too far away to help, looked on. Increasingly embellished variations on the legend emerged over time, with the stories often culminating in Collins singling out the guilty party while singing the song at a concert.

== J ==
- JATO Rocket Car started as a Darwin Award winner where a driver strapped a pair of Jet Assisted Take Off (JATO) units to the rear of his car and ended up smashing into the side of a hill in Arizona. No police agency in Arizona took a report of this type of accident. The Arizona Department of Public Safety even issued a press release on their website debunking the report. This myth was also tested on the Discovery Channel show MythBusters multiple times.
- The Jersey Devil (also known as the Leeds Devil) is a legendary creature said to inhabit the Pine Barrens of South Jersey. The creature is often described as a flying biped with hooves, but there are many variations. The common description is that of a bipedal kangaroo-like or wyvern-like creature with a horse- or goat-like head, leathery bat-like wings, horns, small arms with clawed hands, legs with cloven hooves, and a forked tail. It has been reported to move quickly and is often described as emitting a high-pitched "blood-curdling scream".

== K ==
- The Killer in the backseat (also known as High Beams) is a common car-crime urban legend well known mostly in the United States and the United Kingdom. The legend involves a woman who is driving and being followed by a strange car or truck. The mysterious pursuer flashes his high beams, tailgates her, and sometimes even rams her vehicle. When she finally makes it home, she realizes that the driver was trying to warn her that there was a man (a murderer, rapist, or escaped mental patient) hiding in her back seat.
- The Kinderhook Blob is a local urban legend dating back to the 1960s about a "floating, blob-like creature" haunting wooded areas in and around Kinderhook, New York.
- The Kuchisake-onna (口裂け女, 'Slit-Mouthed Woman') is a Japanese urban legend and folklore. Described as a malicious spirit, or onryō, she partially covers her face with a mask and carries a pair of scissors or some other sharp object. She asks her victims if they think she is beautiful. If they respond with "no", she will kill them with her long medical scissors on the spot.
- The Kunekune (くねくね,"Wriggling body") is an urban legend which concerns distant apparitions seen on widely extended rice or barley fields on hot summer days. A kunekune refers to an indiscernible white object, similar in appearance to a tall, slender strip of paper or a textile sheet, that shimmers and wiggles as if moved by wind, even on windless days. Alleged encounters of kunekune are likely a misinterpretation of a scarecrow wiggling slightly.

== L ==
- The Lafayette vampire is a myth concerning a Transylvanian coal miner who emigrated to Lafayette, Colorado in the early 1900s.
- The Licked Hand (also known as Doggy Lick or Humans Can Lick Too) is an urban legend popular among teenagers. The story describes a killer who secretly spends the night under a girl's bed, licking her hand when offered, which she takes to be her dog.
- Lighthouse and naval vessel, describes a humorous encounter between a large naval ship and what at first appears to be another vessel, with which the ship is on a collision course, which is later revealed to be a lighthouse.
- The Lincoln Imp is a folklore legend that tells of a creature sent to England's Lincoln Cathedral by Satan, only to be turned into stone by an angel.
- Lincoln–Kennedy coincidences urban legend is a list of coincidences that appeared in the mainstream American press in 1964, a year after the assassination of John F. Kennedy.
- La Llorona is a folklore legend that describes a vengeful ghost who roams waterfront areas mourning her children whom she drowned before drowning herself in regret.
- The Loch Ness Monster (also known as Nessie) is a mythical creature in Scottish folklore that is said to inhabit Loch Ness in the Scottish Highlands.
- Love Rollercoaster Scream is an urban legend that about an instrumental portion of the song.
- The Loveland frog (also known as the Loveland frogman or Loveland Lizard) is a folklore legend that describes a humanoid frog standing roughly 4 feet (1.2 m) tall, allegedly spotted in Loveland, Ohio.

== M ==
- The MacKenzie poltergeist is the supposed restless spirit of George Mackenzie, an infamous figure in Scottish history who engaged in merciless oppression of religious minorities, to the extent a portion of the graveyard of Greyfriars Kirkyard he haunts is dedicated (somewhat ironically) to his countless victims.
- The Mad Gasser of Mattoon (also known as the Anesthetic Prowler, the Phantom Anesthetist, or simply the Mad Gasser) was the name given to the person or people believed to be responsible for a series of apparent gas attacks that occurred in Mattoon, Illinois, during the mid-1940s.
- Madam Koi Koi (Lady Koi Koi, Miss Koi Koi, also known in Ghana as Madam High Heel or Madam Moke, Tanzania as Miss Konkoko, South Africa as Pinky Pinky) is an African urban legend that describes a ghost who haunts dormitories, hallways and toilets in boarding schools at night, while in day schools she haunts toilets and students who come to school too early or leave school late. She is often depicted wearing a pair of red heels or wearing a single heel.
- Mae Nak Phra Khanong is an urban legend about the ghost of a pregnant woman whose spirit is said to haunt the people of Phra Khanong, Bangkok, during the early Rattanakosin era (around the reigns of Rama III or Rama IV). She is considered to be one of the most famous Thai ghosts, and her story has been adapted many times into stage plays, TV dramas, and movies.
- La Mala Hora (also known as la Malora or la Malogra) is a folklore legend from New Mexico that describes an evil spirit that haunts the crossroads at night, hunting those who travel the roads alone.
- Melody is dead is an urban legend claiming that Spanish singer Melody died in an airplane accident.
- Melon heads are beings generally described as small humanoids with bulbous heads who occasionally emerge from hiding places to attack people.
- Men in black is an urban legend and conspiracy theory claiming that there are men dressed in black suits who claim to be government agents who harass or threaten UFO witnesses or victims of alleged alien abductions to keep them quiet about what they have seen.
- The Miniwashitu (also known as the Water Monster of the Missouri River) is an aquatic bison-like creature found swimming in the Missouri River in central North Dakota.
- Momo the Monster (also known as the Missouri Monster) is a folklore legend that describes a purported ape-like creature, similar to descriptions of Bigfoot, that was allegedly sighted by numerous people in rural Louisiana, Missouri in 1972.
- The Monkey-man of Delhi was a mysterious creature or criminal that was reported attacking locals near New Delhi in mid-2001. Most sources consider the monster an urban legend and creation brought on from exaggerated media hysteria, often compared to the Spring-heeled Jack epidemic from 19th century London.
- Edward Mordake (sometimes spelled Mordrake) is the apocryphal subject of an urban legend who was, according to the legend, born in the 19th century as the heir to an English peerage with a face at the back of his head.
- The Mothman is a folklore legend that describes a humanoid creature reportedly seen in the Point Pleasant area from 15 November 1966, to 15 December 1967.
- The Mount Victoria Tunnel in Wellington, New Zealand is sometimes claimed to be haunted by the ghost of Phyllis Symons, who was murdered during the construction of the tunnel by being buried alive in the excavated material. Symons' body was discovered and extractd by police, and was ultimately buried in Karori Cemetery. Motorists passing through the tunnel frequently sound their horns, a practice that is claimed to be related to the ghost's presence.
- The Mowing-Devil of Hertfordshire is the title of an English woodcut pamphlet published in 1678. The pamphlet tells of a farmer in Hertfordshire who, refusing to pay the price demanded by a labourer to mow his field, swore he would rather the Devil mowed it instead.
- The mutated Fukushima giant hornets (or the radioactive hornets) is a recent urban legend that describes how giant mutant killer hornets created by exposure to radiation from the Fukushima Daiichi nuclear disaster have killed several people in Nebraska.

== N ==
- The Nai Khanomtom story is a contemporary legend suggesting that a Thai Muaythai fighter had beaten 9 Burmese Lethwei fighters in a row, with no rest period, in 1767. Ultimately, he wins his freedom from King Mangra in Burma.
- The Nain Rouge is a legendary creature of the Detroit, Michigan area whose appearance is said to presage misfortune.
- The Nale Ba are malevolent spirits or witches said to take away children, primarily in Karnataka, India. Writing "naale baa" (which means "come tomorrow") on doors or walls prevents the spirit from entering the houses.
- The Nightmarchers (or the night marchers) are the deadly ghosts of ancient Hawaiian warriors. The nightmarchers are the vanguard for a sacred King, Chief or Chiefess.
- The Niles Canyon ghost is an urban legend within the vanishing hitchhiker archetype about the ghost of a girl who had died in a car accident.
- The Nure-onna (or the 濡女; "wet woman"), a Japanese Yōkai, is a monstrous creature that has the head of a woman and the body of a snake as a giant serpent.

== O ==
- The Oklahoma Octopus is a cryptid story about a giant man eating freshwater octopus living in Lake Thunderbird and other artificial lakes in the US state of Oklahoma. The legend was popularized by an episode of the TV show Lost Tapes.
- The Owlman (sometimes referred to as the Cornish Owlman or the Owlman of Mawnan) is a folklore legend that describes an owl-like creature said to have been seen in 1976 in the village of Mawnan, Cornwall, United Kingdom.
- Ong's Hat is a folklore legend that describes a group of mystics and Princeton scientists that developed interdimensional travel technology in the abandoned town of Ong's Hat, in the New Jersey Pine Barrens.

== P ==
- Paul is dead is an urban legend suggesting that Paul McCartney of the English rock band The Beatles died in 1966 and was secretly replaced by a body double.
- The Parson and Clerk is a tale focusing on a clergyman and the devil set near a natural arch located near the towns of Teignmouth and Dawlish, Devon, England. Along the coast towards Dawlish where the railway runs through the Parson's tunnel can be seen the twin stacks of the Parson and Clerk.
- Julia Petta (also known as the Italian Bride) was a woman who died in childbirth. Her mother dreamed she was still alive and had her body exhumed six years after her death. When the casket was opened, her body, with the exception of the arm holding her stillborn child and the child itself, was still intact.
- The phantom clowns were first sighted in 1981, described as beings dressed as clowns, with white faces, red noses, and colorful clothing in the town of Brookline, Massachusetts.
- The phantom hitchhiker of Black Horse Lake is an urban legend that describes a Native American man with long black hair wearing an outdated, baggy jacket and jeans collides with cars, suddenly appearing on their windshield, only for him to vanish without a dent.
- Phantom P-40 Airplane/pilot in its original form the pilot is a survivor of the 1941 Battle in the Philippines who wages a one-man war against the Japanese until his heavily damaged aircraft crashes in China; a modern variation is that he crashes after flying from the Philippines to Pearl Harbor.
- Phi Yai Wan is an urban legend about the ghost of a pregnant woman, similar to the renowned Mae Nak Phra Khanong, though her story is set in Taling Chan during the 1970s.
- Pishtaco is a folklore legend that describes a mythological boogeyman in the Andes region of South America, particularly in Peru and Bolivia.
- Poisoned candy myths are urban legends about malevolent strangers hiding poisons or sharp objects such as razor blades, needles, or broken glass in candy and distributing the candy to harm random children, especially during Halloween trick-or-treating.
- Polybius is a fictitious arcade game; there is no physical evidence for the game's existence, and it has served as inspiration for several free and commercial games by the same name, as well as a 2025 novel by Collin Armstrong.

== R ==
- The Ratman of Southend is an English urban legend originating in Southend-on-Sea, Essex. The story of the Ratman tells of an old homeless man, seeking shelter from the cold in an underpass, was set upon by a group of youths and beaten to near-death, cold and blood loss doing the rest. As he died, the numerous vermin who inhabit the area gathered, and were found to have devoured his face. After this, a ghostly figure was spotted in the underpass, with people hearing rat-like squealing, and scraping, as if large claws were moving across the walls.
- The Red Lady of Huntingdon College is a ghost said to haunt the former Pratt Hall dormitory at Huntingdon College in Montgomery, Alabama.
- The Red Room Curse (赤い部屋) is a Japanese early Internet urban legend about a supposed red pop-up ad which announces a forthcoming death of the person seeing it.
- Resurrection Mary is a "vanishing hitchhiker"-type ghost story associated with Resurrection Cemetery in Justice, Illinois just outside of Chicago.
- The Richmond Vampire (or Hollywood Vampire) is a purported vampiric entity associated with Church Hill Tunnel and Hollywood Cemetery in Richmond, Virginia. Possibly associated with the 1925 death of Benjamin Mosby, a railway worker killed during restoration work in the tunnel.
- Riverdale Road, a winding 11-mile path between Thornton, Colorado and Brighton, is associated with several supposed hauntings and paranormal phenomena.
- Robert the Doll is an allegedly haunted doll exhibited at the East Martello Museum that was once owned by Key West, Florida, painter and author Robert Eugene Otto.
- Robert Johnson was a Mississippi blues singer and songwriter who, according to legend, sold his soul to Satan "at the crossroads" in exchange for his remarkable talent on the guitar.
- Raymond Robinson (also known as the Green Man and Charlie No-Face) was a severely disfigured man whose years of nighttime walks made him into a figure of urban legend in Pittsburgh, Pennsylvania.
- The Roswell incident is an urban legend that describes a UFO encounter and its extraterrestrial crew crash-landing in the New Mexico desert near Roswell on 2 July 1947.
- The rougarou (alternatively spelled as roux-ga-roux, rugaroo, or rugaru) is a folklore legend that describes a legendary creature in French communities linked to traditional concepts of the werewolf in Acadiana, Louisiana.

== S ==
- La Santa Compaña is a folklore legend that describes a deep-rooted mythical belief in rural northwest of Iberia, Galicia, Asturias (Spain) and Northern Portugal.
- La Sayona is a legend from Venezuela, represented by the vengeful spirit of a woman that shows up only to men that have love affairs out of their marriages.
- The Seven Gates of Hell is a modern urban legend regarding locations in York County, Pennsylvania. Two versions of the legend exist, one involving a burnt insane asylum and the other an eccentric doctor. Both agree that there are seven gates in a wooded area of Hellam Township, Pennsylvania, and that anyone who passes through all seven goes straight to Hell.
- Sewer alligators is an urban legend based upon reports of alligator sightings in rather unorthodox locations, in particular New York City.
- The Shaman's Portal is an urban legend and located in Beaver Dunes Park, Oklahoma due to the strange disappearances that have occurred over the years.
- Shotgun Man is an urban legend of organized crime: as an assassin and spree killer in Chicago, Illinois in the 1910s, to whom murders by Black Hand extortionists were attributed. Most notably, Shotgun Man killed 15 Italian immigrants from 1 January 1910 to 26 March 1911, at "Death Corner," the intersection of Oak Street and Milton Avenue (now Cleveland Avenue) in what was then Chicago's Little Sicily. In March 1911, he reportedly murdered four people within 72 hours. However, a check of the Northwestern University website on "Homicide in Chicago" shows shotgun killings in Chicago – but none in Jan–March 1911 – and only one killing at Oak and Milton Streets between 1900 and 1920 (reference only).
- Showmen's Rest is a mass grave where phantom elephants buried in Woodlawn Cemetery, Forest Park, Illinois, are said to trumpet late at night.
- El Silbón (also known as the Whistler) is a folklore legend that describes a spirit found in Venezuelan legends. He was a former farmer who become a damned soul after he killed his father.
- The Silver Train of Stockholm (also known as the Silver Arrow) is a silver-colored ghost train that supposedly travels in the Stockholm Metro rail system, where ghosts are said to be passengers being taken to the realm of the dead.
- Skeleton in a tree is an urban legend alleging that years after the defeat of St. Clair in 1791 at Fort Recovery, Mercer County, Ohio, the skeleton of a Captain Roger Vanderberg was found in Miami County, Ohio inside a tree, along with a diary. However, no one of this name was a casualty of the 1791 battle; the story originated in 1864 from a Scottish novel.
- Skinned Tom is an urban legend from Walland, Tennessee about a young man named Tom and a bogeyman-type figure who came to a grisly end.
- The skunk ape (also known as the swamp ape and Florida Bigfoot) is a folklore legend that describes an ape-like creature that is purported to inhabit the forests and swamps of the southeastern United States, most notably in Florida where sightings have been reported from as far north as the Georgian border, south to the Florida Keys.
- Slaughterhouse Canyon (or Luana's Canyon) is a valley in Arizona and has an elevation of 3,428 feet; the myth takes place during the Gold Rush.
- The Smith sisters is an urban legend about two young girls who were murdered anonymously while they slept in their bedroom.
- The Snarly Yow is a folklore legend that describes a mysterious giant black dog that has been sighted at various spots on West Virginia, Maryland and Virginia.
- Snuff films (footage of actual murders and other depraved acts of cruelty being created for profit and/or personal entertainment) have been rumored for decades within the American film industry, with one of the first known films to be accused of the practice being the 1976 exploitation horror film Snuff.
- El Sombrerón (also known as the Goblin and sometimes Tzipitio and Tzizimite) is a folklore legend that describes a legendary character and one of the most infamous legends of Central America.
- The Spider Bite (or The Red Spot) is a modern urban legend that emerged in Europe during the 1970s. It features a young woman who is bitten on the cheek by a spider. The bite swells into a large boil and soon bursts open to reveal hundreds of tiny spiders escaping from her cheek.
- The Spiteful Mermaid of Pyramid Lake is an urban legend describing a man from the Paiute tribe that claimed that he fell in love with a mermaid in the lake, with the mermaid then cursing the lake as an act of vengeance.
- Spook Hill is an urban legend that describes a gravity hill, an optical illusion in Lake Wales, Florida, where cars appear to roll uphill.
- The Spooklight is a legend that is a ghost light reported to appear in a small area known locally as the "Devil's Promenade" in Missouri and Oklahoma.
- Springfield pet-eating hoax surfaced in September 2024 when a Facebook post reported that Haitian immigrants in Springfield, Ohio were eating neighbors’ pets. The baseless charge went viral and was taken up by right-wing groups and repeated by presidential candidate Donald Trump and his vice-presidential running mate JD Vance.
- Spring-heeled Jack is a British urban legend from the Victorian era involving the alleged sightings of a humanoid creature capable of leaping at great lengths and for reportedly assaulting several women in the streets of London. The first claimed sighting of Spring-heeled Jack was in 1837. Later sightings were reported all over the United Kingdom and were especially prevalent in suburban London, the Midlands and Scotland.
- Stingy Jack is a legend from Irish folklore describing a mythical character who cheated the Devil and was cursed to roam the Earth for all eternity with a small ember burning inside a carved turnip as his only source of light. He is sometimes associated with the holiday Halloween while also acting as the mascot of the holiday, with his story possibly serving as the basis for the modern Jack-o'-lantern.`

== T ==
- Teke Teke (テケテケ) is the ghost of a young woman or schoolgirl who was tied to the railway line by bullies, which resulted in her body being cut in half by a train. She is an onryō, a vengeful spirit, who lurks around urban areas and train stations at night. Since she no longer has lower extremities, she travels on either her hands or elbows, dragging her upper torso and making a scratching or "teke teke"-like sound. If she encounters a potential victim, she will chase them and slice them in half at the torso with a scythe or other weapon.
- Teufelstritt (also known as the black kick, the devil's kick or the Devil's Footstep) is an imprint on the floor of the entrance hall of the Frauenkirche.
- Tha Tien, where legend has it that two temple guardian giants clashed. The Giant of Wat Pho borrowed money from the Giant of Wat Jaeng (Temple of Dawn) and refused to pay it back. They fought fiercely in the midstream of the Chao Phraya River near Phra Nakhon. As a result of the battle, the around area was completely flattened, hence the name "Tha Tien", which means "flat pier".
- Thong Luk (ทองลุก, lit. 'gold rising') is a supernatural phenomenon in Thai folklore, where a brilliant golden light suddenly rises from the ground, believed to mark hidden treasure. The tale is linked to Lord Uthong, a mythical figure (not the King of Ayutthaya), who was said to have passed through areas like Taling Chan with a barge full of gold that eventually sank. One elderly woman, born in 1927, claimed to witness Thong Luk late at night while pregnant. She awoke to a blinding light in her yard and thought it was fire, but later realized it was the glowing gold. According to local belief, placing a sarong over the glow would make the treasure stay, but she did not know that at the time. A senior monk also recalled hearing elders chant and tell stories of Lord Uthong and glowing gold appearing here and there across the land. In modern Bangkok, the story lives on as both a local legend and an enduring urban legend, blurring the line between myth, memory, and place.
- El Trauco is a folklore legend that describes a repulsive dwarf-like creature with hypnotic powers that is known to prey on and impregnate unmarried women.

== U ==
- The Ultimate Warrior was an American professional wrestler whose death was the subject of numerous urban legends. Stories existed that he either tied his arm tassels too tightly and cut off the circulation to his body, overdosed on steroids or was killed in the ring while wrestling. Warrior eventually died in 2014 from a heart attack.

== V ==
- The Vanishing hitchhiker (or variations such as the ghostly hitchhiker, the disappearing hitchhiker, the phantom hitchhiker or simply the hitchhiker) story is an urban legend in which people traveling by vehicle meet with, or are accompanied by, a hitchhiker who subsequently vanishes without explanation, often from a moving vehicle. Vanishing hitchhikers have been reported for centuries and the story is found across the world with many variants. The popularity and endurance of the legend has helped it spread into popular culture.
- The Vanishing Hotel Room a.k.a. Vanishing Lady: During an international exposition in Paris, a daughter leaves her mother in a hotel room; when she comes back her mother is gone and the hotel staff claims to have no knowledge of the missing woman. It is later revealed that the mother was dying of plague and, fearing for the negative impact on the hotel's public image, the staff just disposed of the mother, redecorated the room and pretended as if nothing had happened. This served as inspiration for the movie So Long at the Fair, and was based on a turn-of-the-century Philadelphia newspaper story.

== W ==
- Walking Sam (or Tall Man) is an urban legend that describes a 7-foot-tall specter whose job it is to collect the souls of suicide victims and stalks lonely, depressed adolescents.
- Walt Disney's Cryo Chamber is an urban legend claiming that after his death in December 1966, Walt's body (or in some versions just his head) was placed in a cryostasis chamber located somewhere beneath Disney World or Epcot.
- The Water Babies of Massacre Rocks (originates from Idaho) are a Native American legend that are found in a couple of different places in America, but most famously in Pocatello at the Massacre Rocks State Park. They are said to be mischievous or malevolent baby- or dwarf-like creatures, with some tales placing their origins as drowned Native American babies during a famine.
- The Well to Hell legend holds that a team of Russian engineers, purportedly led by an individual named "Mr. Azakov" in an unnamed place in Siberia, had drilled a hole that was 14.4 kilometres (8.9 mi) deep before breaking through to a cavity. Intrigued by this unexpected discovery, they lowered an extremely heat-tolerant microphone, along with other sensory equipment, into the well. The temperature deep within was 1,000 °C (1,832 °F) – heat from a chamber of fire from which (purportedly) the tormented screams of the damned could be heard.
- The Duke of Wellington at Pau, France first appeared in a 1907 publication coinciding with the 65th anniversary of the founding of the Pau Hunt, and quickly developed into a tale about the origins of Fox hunting in Béarn. After the Peninsular War, Wellington spent just one night at Pau, 18 May 1814, stopping on the route from Toulouse to Madrid. The tale of a more lengthy and marked presence developed 90 years later as a prank that regular winter colonists played on newcomers. The tale found its way into touristic marketing publications, memoires and academic publications during challenging times, and then, despite contradictory historical evidence, it has developed into Bearnese folklore. Worldwide, it is difficult to find any 21st century historical passage about the 19th century "English" colony at Pau that does not cite some form of this legend as fact.
- Women in Black of Wat Samian Nari is a well-known Thai ghost story involving the spirits of the beautiful Thipsuksri sisters, Chulee and Sulee, who were said to have died tragically in the 1990s. Wearing black dresses, the sisters were reportedly crushed by a train in front of Wat Samian Nari temple in the Chatuchak district of Bangkok; their bodies were torn in half, and their souls are believed to remain in the area. Their ghosts are said to appear at night, particularly to taxi drivers. One frequently told version involves two silent women in black hailing a cab from the Ratchadapisek or RCA entertainment district after midnight; they ask to be taken to Wat Samian Nari. Assuming they are returning home from a night out, the driver notices that the women sit motionless, never speaking or acknowledging him. As the car nears the destination, the driver glances into the rearview mirror and finds the back seat empty. Dazed, he pulls over and steps out, only to see the horrifying sight of the two sisters lying across the train tracks in front of the temple, cut in half, their bloodied torsos slowly dragging forward. A former taxi driver, now a reporter for Thairath, claimed to be the first to share this story publicly. At the time, he was still working night shifts. He told his account on a ghost-themed radio program hosted by Kapol Thongplub, estimating that the incident took place around 1992.

== Y ==
- Yuki-onna (雪女, lit. 'snow woman') is a yōkai in Japanese folklore that haunts mountain passes and snowy forests during fierce blizzards. She kills her victims with her icy breath, leaving them a frozen corpse.

== See also ==
- List of spurious works of fiction
- List of alleged extraterrestrial beings
- List of common misconceptions
- List of conspiracy theories
- List of cryptids
- List of reported UFO sightings
- List of urban legends about illegal drugs

== Bibliography ==
- Thongdaeng, Wityada; Thongpan, Saran (2012). ชุมทางตลิ่งชัน ย่านเก่า [ก่อน] กรุงเทพฯ [Taling Chan junction old neighbourhood [before] Bangkok] (in Thai). Bangkok: Muang Boran Journal. ISBN 978-974-7727-93-7.
