= List of allegedly cursed objects =

This is a list of objects that are said to be cursed.

Object	Description	Nature of supposed curse	References
The Anguished Man	Painting of an abstract figure	Believed to cause bad luck	
Basano vase	15th century silver vase	Those who own it said to die shortly after	
Busby's stoop chair	Wooden chair	Said to have been cursed by murderer Thomas Busby, with wartime deaths and fatal accidents linked to it	
Black Orlov	Indian diamond	Said to bring an "unshakeable curse" to anyone who carries it	
Black Prince's Ruby	Gemstone	Said to bring bad luck and early death to its owners	
The Crying Boy	Painting by Giovanni Bragolin	Thought to be linked to fires in houses that display prints of the painting	
The Conjured Chest	19th century chest of drawers	Said to have caused the death of eighteen people who stored their clothes in it	
Delhi Purple Sapphire	Amethyst thought to have been looted during the Indian Mutiny of 1857	Said to bring bad luck, including the loss of a professional singer's voice	
Dybbuk box	Antique wine cabinet	Said to bring bad luck and nightmares	
Gold of Tolosa	Roman treasure hoard	Said to bring misfortune to those who stole it and their defeat in battle	
The Hands Resist Him	Painting by Bill Stoneham	Said to cause nightmares	
Hope Diamond	Blue-violet gemstone mined in the 17th century	Believed to cause misfortune and death to those who own or wear it	
James Dean's car "Little Bastard"	Porsche 550	Said to have caught fire years after Dean died in it, and to have caused another car that reused one of its parts to crash	
Koh-i-Noor	Indian diamond	Said to bring bad luck if worn by a man	
Man Proposes, God Disposes	Painting by Edwin Landseer	Reputed to cause students in the university room that displays it to fail exams, or be driven to suicide	
Muramasa swords	Swords made by the 16th-century Japanese swordsmith	Thought to lead to misfortune	
Ötzi the Iceman	Mummified body from 3350–3105 BCE	Several people connected with its discovery died premature deaths	
Wood from Petrified Forest National Park	Petrified wood	Removing wood from the park is said to bring bad luck	
Ring of Silvianus	4th century gold ring	After being stolen, the ring was the subject of a Roman curse tablet where its owner said that the family of its thief should "permit no good health until it is returned"	
Robert	Cloth doll	Said to cause accidents and misfortunes to those who fail to "respect" it	
Regent Diamond	17th century Indian diamond	Believed to be connected to violence and murder, with monarchs who owned it being dethroned through execution or exile	
Rudolph Valentino's ring	Jewelled ring	Said to have led to the early death of many owners, including Valentino	
Stones from the Gettysburg Battlefield	Remnants of stone walls	Said to bring bad luck if removed from the park	
Terracotta Army	Chinese funerary sculptures from c. 200 BCE	Said to have brought bad luck to those who discovered the statues in 1974	
Tomb of Tutankhamun	Egyptian burial site	Said to have brought deaths and misfortunes to those connected to the 1922 excavation; press at the time falsely reported that a curse was inscribed in the tomb	
Woman from Lemb	Limestone statue dating from 3500 BCE	Said to bring death to its owners	

== See also ==
- List of reportedly haunted paintings
