= List of reportedly haunted paintings =

The following works of art have been described as being haunted or cursed in some way.

== Portrait of Bernardo de Gálvez ==
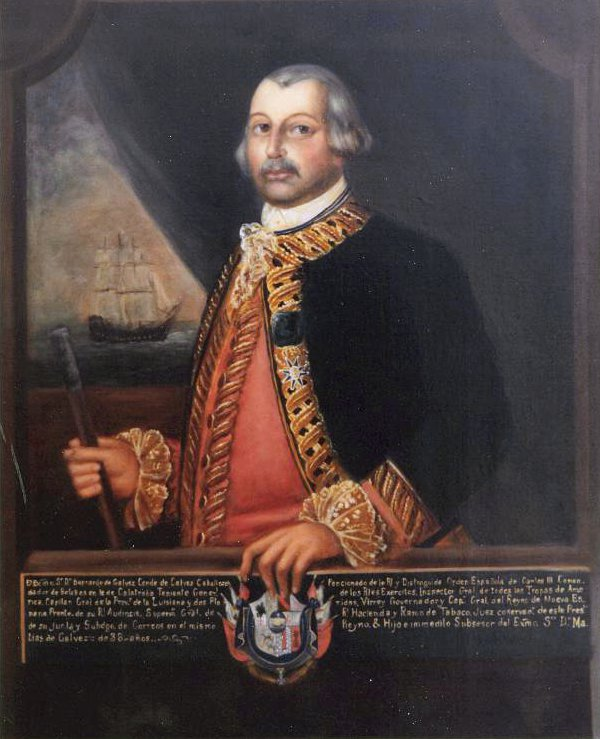
Gálvez's portrait

The painting of the Spanish General Bernardo de Gálvez (1746–1786) at the end of a hallway in Hotel Galvez in Galveston, Texas, is said to have supernatural influence over photographs taken of it. Some claim to see a skull in flash photography of the painting, and, according to local folklore, visitors must politely ask permission of the ghost to take a picture of the portrait, or else the photo will be ruined upon development.

== Portrait of Henrietta Nelson ==
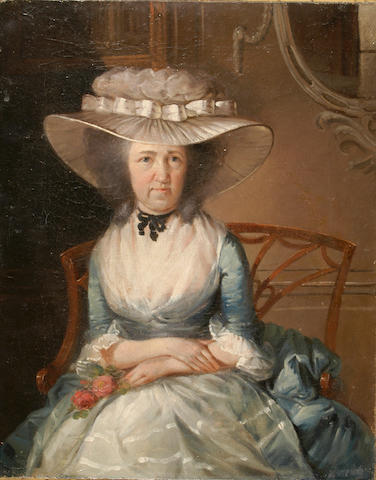
William Johnson's portrait of Henrietta Nelson (c. 1780)

Henrietta Nelson (1734–1816) died by falling down a flight of stairs in her home at Yaxley Hall in the English town of Eye, and was buried in a mausoleum on the property, according to her wishes. However, years later, new owners moved in and destroyed the mausoleum, moving her remains to a nearby church. According to legend, Nelson has haunted the grounds ever since, trying to return home to her desired resting place.

A portrait of Nelson by William Johnson has purportedly become imbued with her spirit, with her ghost following it even when moved out of the house. Viewers have reported her face in the painting changing shape, and a pale figure with identical clothing walking the grounds.

== Man Proposes, God Disposes ==
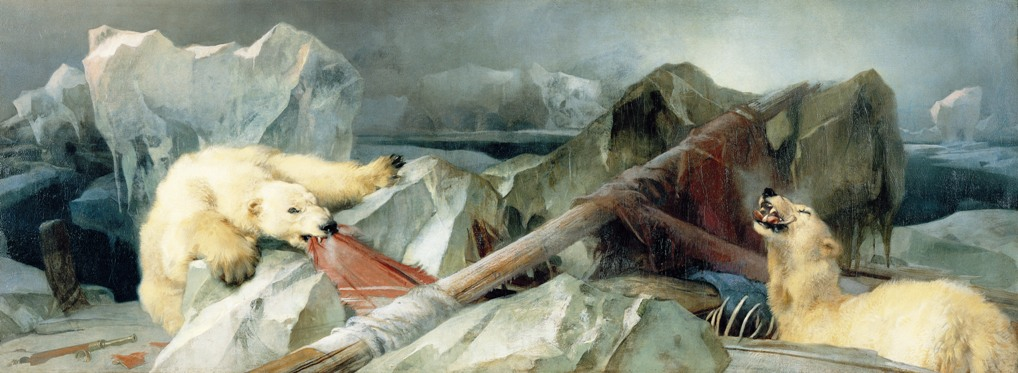
Man Proposes, God Disposes

Edwin Landseer's 1864 painting Man Proposes, God Disposes is believed to be haunted and a bad omen. According to urban myth, a student of Royal Holloway college once committed suicide during exams by stabbing a pencil into their eye, writing "The polar bears made me do it" on their exam paper. There is, however, no university record of a death in the picture gallery.

Another legend among students dating back to at least the 1960s is that anyone sitting in front of the painting during an exam will fail it. This has led to teachers covering the painting with a Union Jack when student examinations are ongoing.

== Mi Novia ==
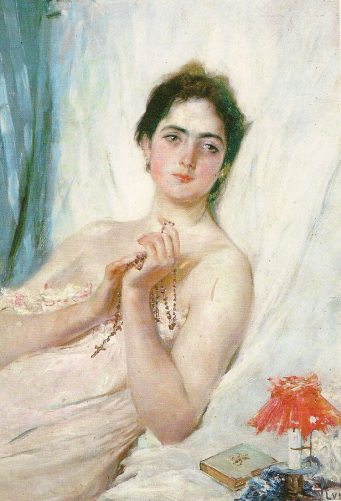
Portrait of a Lady by Juan Luna

Legend says this undated portrait by Juan Luna, also known as Portrait of a Lady, is of the artist's wife, Paz Pardo de Tavera, who Juan Luna murdered.

According to legend, the painting is now possessed by the spirit of Paz, who brings misfortune upon its owners. Past owners have died in car crashes, been forced into bankruptcy, and experienced miscarriage, among other reported sorrows. During the opening night of a 1987 exhibition at the Metropolitan Museum of Manila, the spotlight bulb over the painting exploded.

The woman depicted in the painting is believed to be Angela Duche, a favorite model of the painter who was neither married to nor murdered by him.

== Death and the Child ==
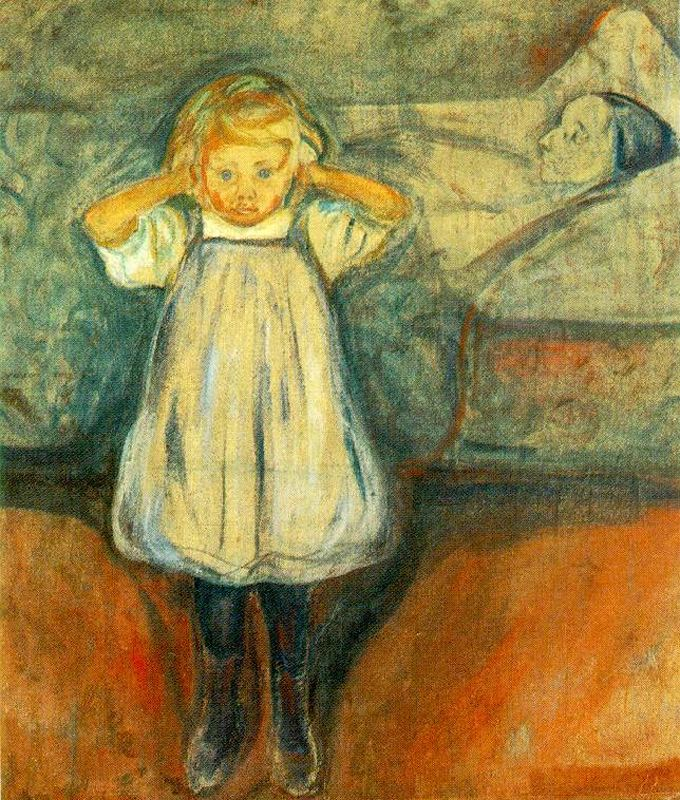
Munch's Death and the Child (1899) from the collection of the Kunsthalle Bremen

According to urban legend, a particular 1899 copy of Edvard Munch's painting Death and the Child (sometimes known as The Dead Mother) is cursed. Viewers have described the horrified girl's eyes following them as they move, and hearing a soft rustling sound (usually attributed to the eponymous mother's bed sheets) when near the painting. Previous owners of the painting are said to have described the girl disappearing altogether from the canvas.

Munch's mother and sister died of tuberculosis when he was a child, and memories of that trauma were a recurring motif throughout his work. Munch was also influenced by the nihilist Hans Jæger, who urged him to paint his own emotional and psychological state (described as 'soul painting'), leading to his distinctive style.

Since 1918 the painting has been in the collection of the Kunsthalle Bremen.

== The Crying Boy ==
Prints of The Crying Boy by 20th-century painter Giovanni Bragolin were blamed for a series of house fires in the 1980s, after prints were found undamaged amidst the ruins of multiple burned houses.

Research at the Building Research Establishment concluded that the prints had been treated with a varnish containing fire retardant, and that the string holding the painting to the wall would be the first to deteriorate, resulting in the painting landing face down on the floor and thus being protected.

== The Hands Resist Him ==
Characters in Bill Stoneham's 1972 painting The Hands Resist Him are said to move or leave the painting during the night. It is on display at the Perception Gallery in Grand Rapids, Michigan.

== Love Letters ==
Richard King's painting Love Letters (painted circa 1990) is said to be haunted by Samantha Houston, a four-year-old girl who fell to her death in the Driskill Hotel in Austin, Texas, where the painting hangs. As a result, the expression of the girl in the painting is said to change whenever one looks away. Guests have also reported dizziness, nausea, and feeling like they are floating or falling while viewing the painting. Despite the legend, no Samantha Houston has been confirmed to have existed or died by falling.

The painting is a replica of an original painting by the same name by Charles Trevor Garland (1855–1906).

== Pogo the Clown ==
Pogo the Clown is a signed 1990s self-portrait by the serial killer John Wayne Gacy, depicting his alter-ego, "Pogo the Clown". Musician Nikki Stone purchased the painting for $3,000 in 2001, but began to regret the purchase when his dog died and his mother got cancer, which he attributed to the malicious influence of the painting. A friend offered to keep the painting, and soon after the friend's neighbor was killed in a car crash. A second friend then took it for storage, and later attempted suicide. The painting was never hung up, and was given to a local art dealer.

== The Rain Woman ==
Svetlana Telets, an artist from Vinnytsia, Ukraine, painted The Rain Woman in 1996 after reportedly feeling like she was constantly being watched for six months. According to the artist, she was sitting in front of a blank canvas, when a clear vision of the final painting appeared to her. Feeling like "someone was controlling" her hand, she sketched the composition for five hours, then spent another month refining the details.

After displaying it in a local art salon, multiple people successively bought the painting, only to return it to the seller after describing a figure following them in their homes and dreams. One temporary owner described white eyes appearing everywhere he looked, and returned the painting with an offer to pay back half the purchase price, fearing he might drown in the eyes if kept for any longer. The piece was eventually purchased by the musician Sergei Skachkov in 2008, though reportedly his wife later hid the painting after seeing a ghostly figure walk around their apartment at night.

According to Archpriest Vitaly Goloskevich of the Transfiguration Cathedral in Vinnytsia, "A person has a spirit and a soul. There are truly spiritual works of art, and there are soulful ones. And the painting you are talking about represents just such soulful art. And it doesn't come from God.... The artist puts into the work the mood in which he was at the time of his writing. And it is not known who led the artist at that moment."

== The Scariest Picture on the Internet (REAL) ==
An early internet creepypasta, a video from the 2000s titled The Scariest Picture on the Internet (REAL), claimed to show a portrait that had been painted by a Japanese woman shortly before committing suicide. The text accompanying the video claims that people who stared into its eyes for more than five minutes had also killed themselves.

== I Can't Be a Bride Anymore ==
A 1999 painting titled I Can’t Be a Bride Anymore by Yuko Tatsushima became attached to one of Yaso Saijō's poems from a 1919 poetry collection named "Sakin" (砂金), titled "Tomino's Hell", with claims that the painting was cursed, even though the painting and the poem were created independently. The red and black scratched painting depicts a figure of a woman with an elongated neck. Tatsushima has stated that most of her paintings are self-portraits, and often incorporate themes of sexual abuse, nuclear holocaust, and borderline personality disorder.

== The Anguished Man ==
The Anguished Man is a painting by an unknown artist. In 2010, owner Sean Robinson uploaded a YouTube video which included a text description of how he had heard “strange noises and crying", and seen the figure of a man appear. Guests reportedly had nosebleeds and experienced extreme nausea while looking at the painting.

== See also ==
- List of allegedly cursed objects
- List of reportedly haunted locations
- Cursed image
