= Freaky Stories =

Canadian television series

- Genre: Comedy thriller; Dark fantasy; Horror; Science fiction; Mystery; Surrealism
- Created by: Steve Schnier
- Developed by: Steve Schnier; John A. Delmage
- Starring: James Rankin; Dan Redican; Stephen Brathwaite; Jayne Eastwood (season 1)
- Theme music composer: John McCarthy
- Country of origin: Canada
- Original languages: English; French
- No. of seasons: 3
- No. of episodes: 35 (140 segments)

Production
- Executive producers: John A. Delmage; Neil Court (season 1); Steven DeNure (season 1); Neil Bregman (seasons 2–3); Curtis Crawford (seasons 2–3)
- Producers: Steve Schnier; Rick Morrison (seasons 2–3)
- Running time: 22 minutes
- Production companies: Decode Entertainment (Note: As Big-Time Talking Pictures Inc. (season 1), Big-Time Talking Pictures 2 Ltd. (season 2), and Big-Time Talking Pictures 3 Ltd. (season 3)); Funbag Animation Studios; Sound Venture Productions (seasons 2–3); Vujade Entertainment

Original release
- Network: YTV (Canada); Canal Famille (French Canada)
- Release: October 24, 1997 – December 17, 1999

Freaky Stories is a Canadian animated anthology television series originally broadcast by YTV in English and Canal Famille in French (five-minute versions using the French title Frissons). It is an animated show about urban legends hosted by two animatronic puppets, Larry de Bug (voiced by James Rankin), a cockroach, and his gooey sidekick, Maurice (voiced by Dan Redican) the maggot in Ted's Diner - a 1940s-era diner setting staffed by Rosie the waitress (voiced by Jayne Eastwood, but never seen - season 1 only).

== Premise ==
The series, described as "a The Twilight Zone for kids", centers on the kind of myths and legends that are told as scary campfire or bedtime stories. Every episode always starts with and finishes with the phrase: "This is a true story, and it happened to a friend of a friend of mine." and by the words of Larry, "Just because they never happened, doesn't mean they ain't true." Animation styles and musical scoring varied within each half-hour episode, incorporating 20 different looks in the first season alone. The short stories and changing styles were specifically designed to keep viewers' attention span.

== Production ==
Series creator Steve Schnier successfully pitched his concept of modern urban legends to YTV in 1991. In 1994, Steve teamed with executive producer John Delmage. The resulting Freaky Stories pilot premiered during YTV's "Dark Night 3" Halloween block on October 28, 1995, and the series itself premiered as a one-hour special as part of "Dark Night 5" on October 24, 1997. While most episodes were finished on Digital Betacam, the pilot was shot on film using traditional animation techniques but completed on video. The subsequent series was digitally inked, painted and composited.

== Cast ==
- James Rankin - Larry de Bug
- Dan Redican - Maurice the Maggot

=== Additional narrator cast ===
- Pam Hyatt
- Sahrla Bonneville
- Ben Campbell
- Jonathan Wilson
- Juan Chioran
- Diego Matamoros
- Susan Roman
- Adrian Truss
- Lisa Yamanaka
- Tara Meyer
- Stephanie Morgenstern
- Don Francks
- Nadine Rabinovitch
- Nigel Bennett
- Denis Akiyama
- Ruby Smith-Merovitz
- Jennifer Dodge
- Richard Yearwood
- Tanja Jacobs
- Rick Jones
- Dan Hennessey
- Chris Wiggins
- Emilie-Claire Barlow
- Diane D'Aquila
- Debbie Murphy
- Maryke Hendrikse
- Neil Crone
- Catherine Disher
- Alyson Court
- Robert Bockstael
- Marnie McPhail
- Alison Sealy-Smith
- Linda Kash
- Maurice Dean Wint

== Episodes ==
=== Season 1 (1997–98) ===
- Episode 1: The Big Queasy - October 24, 1997
  - Prison Break/Cat Food/Weenie Wonderland/Mixed Nuts
- Episode 2: Boys and Ghouls - October 31, 1997
  - A Shot in the Dark/First Kiss/Blind Date/The Suspect
- Episode 3: Animal Maggotism - November 7, 1997
  - The Resurrection of Fluffy/Fifi to Go/Bug in the Ear/The Flying Kitten
- Episode 4: Take This Job and Love It - November 14, 1997
  - Pizza Guy/Carpet Man/Out of the Blue/Blunder Bed
- Episode 5: Designer Tales - November 21, 1997
  - Diet Pill/Spiders in the Hairdo/The Fly/Hanging by a Thread
- Episode 6: Boo! - November 28, 1997
  - Snatched/Graveyard Wager/Puddle and the Glow Monster/The Vampire
- Episode 7: When You Gotta Go You Gotta Go - December 5, 1997
  - Locked Out at 20,000/The $50 Porsche/The Bunker/A Concrete Cadillac
- Episode 8: Law and Disorder - December 12, 1997
  - The Rug Bug/Cat-Napping/Free Gas/The Hook
- Episode 9: Not the Waltons - December 19, 1997
  - Black Bean Soup/Bottle of Wine/To Pee or Not to Pee/Break a Leg
- Episode 10: Oops! - December 26, 1997
  - The Moving Cactus/The Mystery Smell/Fetch the Ball/Accidental Cannibals
- Episode 11: Gotcha! - January 2, 1998
  - Dumb Waiter/Luggage/Mama Mia/Jaxx in the Box
- Episode 12: School Daze - January 9, 1998
  - Field Trip/The Story/Panty Raid/The Experiment
- Episode 13: End of the Day - January 16, 1998
  - The Flower Lady/The Bookkeeper/Voice From Within/Pig Story

=== Season 2 (1998–99) ===
- Episode 14/1: Dog From Mexico/The Mortician's Daughter/Pigeon Dave/Hair Today, Gone... - October 23, 1998
- Episode 15/2: Murray and the Rats/Safe at Home/The Gift/Maple Syrup - October 30, 1998
- Episode 16/3: Last Cab Fare/Nude in the RV/Alligator in the Sewer/Do Unto Others - November 6, 1998
- Episode 17/4: Stolen Lunchbox/Front Row Seats/The Vanishing/Dead Man Walking - November 13, 1998
- Episode 18/5: Radar Benny/Battleship/Severed Digit/Photo Op - November 20, 1998
- Episode 19/6: Last Call/Identical Twins/Bat Girl/The Nosy Maid - November 27, 1998
- Episode 20/7: Apologies to Steinbeck/The Creeping Curse of the Mummy's Tomb/A Fishy Story/Dumped in the Outback - December 4, 1998
- Episode 21/8: Traders/Court in the Act/Furd and the Veep/Mooching Roommate - December 11, 1998
- Episode 22/9: The Iron Fist Principal/Field of Seeds/Last Laugh/The Immortal Osgood Toadworthy - December 18, 1998
- Episode 23/10: The Need For Speed/Zit's A Horrible Life/The Girl With the Hoarky Cough/The Smell of Fear - December 25, 1998
- Episode 24/11: Pirates/Choc-Roaches/Femme Fatale/Dear Mother and Father - January 1, 1999
- Episode 25/12: The Boy Who Cried Alien/Did You Have Fun At The Party?/The Rich Fart/Sewer Swimming Hole - January 8, 1999
- Episode 26/13: The Man Who Picked His Brain/The Big Question/Smelly Kelly/Go Find Something To Do, Kid! - January 15, 1999

=== Season 3 (1999) ===
- Episode 27/1: Deep Forest Diver/Double Your Pleasure/Prize/Hokus Pokus - October 22, 1999
- Episode 28/2: Long Long Distance Call/Sweet Dreams/Duelling Sisters/Stuck Face - October 29, 1999
- Episode 29/3: The 13th Floor/Fishing Hole/Bean Boy/Rugs R us - November 5, 1999
- Episode 30/4: Mark IV/Invisible Shirley/Chatty Monk/Mouse in the House - November 12, 1999
- Episode 31/5: So Long Sing Sing/Fountain of Youth/Ouija Board/Houston, We Have a Problem - November 19, 1999
- Episode 32/6: At the Circus/The Genius/Which is Witch is Which?/Loch Ness Incident - November 26, 1999
- Episode 33/7: Sour Puss/Monkey's Paw/First Anniversary/Bagel Boy - December 3, 1999
- Episode 34/8: The Getaway/The Babysitter/The Meal/Wax Museum - December 10, 1999
- Episode 35/9: Mouse Trap/Monkey Shines/A Little Push/The Lodger - December 17, 1999
