= High beam (disambiguation) =

A high beam is a type of automobile headlight.

High beam or high beams may also refer to:

- Killer in the backseat, an urban legend
- HighBeam Research, a defunct Internet search engine
- "High Beams", song by Big K.R.I.T., from K.R.I.T. Iz Here, 2019
- "High Beams", song by Zach Bryan, from American Heartbreak, 2022
