= Sean Robinson =

Sean Robinson may refer to:

- Sean Robinson (filmmaker) (born 1985), American film director and editor
- Sean Robinson (rugby union, born 1991), English rugby union player
- Sean Robinson (rugby union, born 1993), South African rugby union player
- Sean Robinson (born 1995), English boxer who participated in Ultimate Boxxer V
- Sean Robinson, English owner of the reportedly haunted painting The Anguished Man
