= Surreal humour =

Form of humour predicated on deliberate violations of causal reasoning

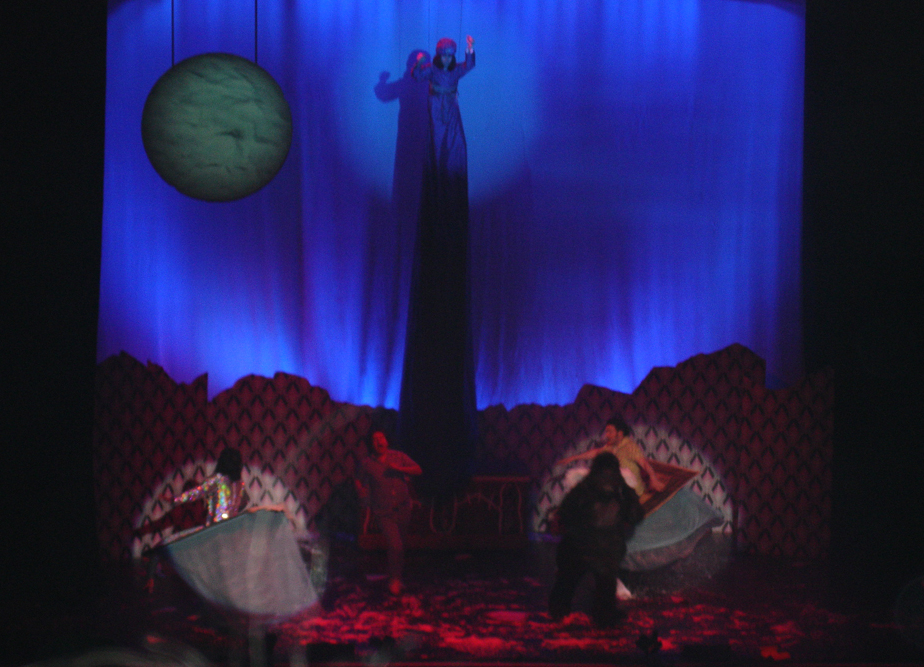
The style of humour of the comedy act The Mighty Boosh is often described as surreal.

Surreal humour (also called surreal comedy, absurdist humour, or absurdist comedy) is a form of humour predicated on deliberate violations of causal reasoning, thus producing events and behaviours that are obviously illogical. Portrayals of surreal humour tend to involve bizarre juxtapositions, incongruity, non-sequiturs, irrational or absurd situations, and expressions of nonsense.

Surreal humour grew out of surrealism, a cultural movement developed in the 20th century by French and Belgian artists, who depicted unnerving and illogical scenes while developing techniques to allow the unconscious mind to express itself. The movement itself was foreshadowed by English writers in the 19th century, most notably Lewis Carroll and Edward Lear. The humour in surreal comedy arises from a subversion of audience expectations, emphasising the ridiculousness and unlikeliness of a situation, so that amusement is founded on an unpredictability that is separate from a logical analysis of the situation.

Surreal humour is concerned with building up expectations and then knocking them down; even seemingly masterful characters with the highest standards and expectations are subverted by the unexpected, which the scene emphasises for the viewer's amusement. Either the "goofball" or "straight" character in the scene can react with dull surprise, disdain, boredom, or detached interest, thus heightening comic tension. Characters' intentions are set up in a series of scenes significantly different from what the audience might ordinarily encounter in daily life. The unique social situations, expressed thoughts, actions, and comic lines are used to spark laughter, emotion, or surprise as to how the events occurred or unfolded, in ways sometimes favourable to other unexpectedly introduced characters.

Surreal humour in theatre is usually about the insensitivity, paradox, absurdity, and cruelty of the modern world. Absurd and surrealist cinema often deals with elements of dark humour, disturbing or sinister subjects like death, disease, or warfare are treated with amusement and bitterness, creating the appearance of an intention to shock and offend.

== Literary precursors ==
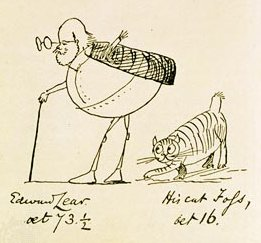
Edward Lear's 1885 lithograph Edward Lear, Aged 73 and a Half, and His Cat Foss, Aged 16

Surreal humour is the effect of the illogical and absurd being used for humorous effect. Under such premises, people can identify precursors and early examples of surreal humour at least since the 19th century, such as in Lewis Carroll's Alice's Adventures in Wonderland and Through the Looking-Glass, both of which use the illogical and absurd (hookah-smoking caterpillars, croquet matches using live flamingos as mallets, etc.) for humorous effect. Many of Edward Lear's children's stories and poems contain nonsense and are basically surreal in approach. For example, The Story of the Four Little Children Who Went Round the World (1871) is filled with contradictory statements and odd images intended to provoke amusement, such as the following:

After a time they saw some land at a distance; and when they came to it, they found it was an island made of water quite surrounded by earth. Besides that, it was bordered by evanescent isthmuses with a great Gulf-stream running about all over it, so that it was perfectly beautiful, and contained only a single tree, 503 feet high.

== Relationship with dadaism and futurism ==
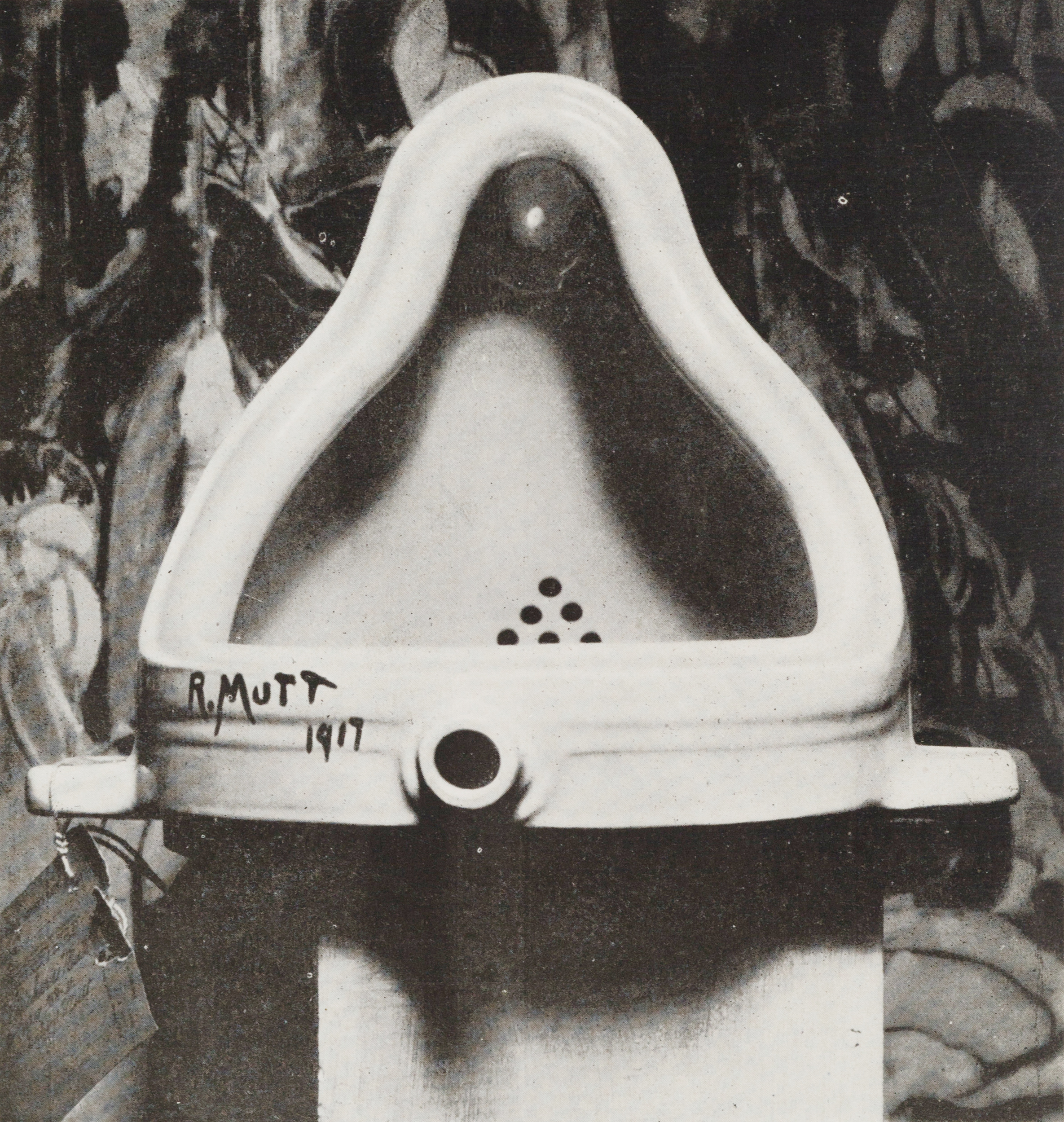
Marcel Duchamp's Fountain (1917), an inverted urinal signed "R. Mutt"

In the early 20th century, several avant-garde movements, including the dadaists, surrealists, and futurists began to argue for an art that was random, jarring and illogical. The goals of these movements were in some sense serious, and they were committed to undermining the solemnity and self-satisfaction of the contemporary artistic establishment of the time. As a result, much of their art was intentionally amusing.

One example is Marcel Duchamp's Fountain (1917), an inverted urinal signed "R. Mutt". This became one of the most famous and influential pieces of art in history, and one of the earliest examples of the found object movement. It is also a joke, relying on the inversion of the item's function as expressed by its title as well as its incongruous presence in an art exhibition.

== Etymology and development ==
The word surreal first began to be used to describe a type of aesthetic of the early 1920s.

Surreal humour is also found frequently in avant-garde theatre such as Waiting for Godot and Rosencrantz and Guildenstern Are Dead. In the United States, S. J. Perelman (1904–1979) has been identified as the first surrealist humour writer.

Surrealist humour appeared on British radio from 1951 to 1960 by the cast of The Goon Show: Spike Milligan, Peter Sellers, and Harry Secombe. The Goons' work influenced the American radio comedy troupe the Firesign Theatre (1966–2012). The Firesigns wrote sophisticated comic radio plays, many of which were recorded on albums.

Surrealist humour is predominantly approached in cinema where the suspension of disbelief can be stretched to absurd lengths by logically following the consequences of unlikely, reversed or exaggerated premises. Luis Buñuel is a principal exponent of this, especially in The Exterminating Angel. It is a prominent feature in the television and cinematic work of the British comedy troupe Monty Python (1969–2014). Other examples include The Falls by Peter Greenaway and Brazil by Terry Gilliam.

Contemporary Internet meme culture, such as Weird Twitter, Skibidi Toilet, and YouTube poop, is also influenced by surreal humour.

== Analysis ==
Mary K. Rodgers and Diana Pien analysed the subject in an essay titled "Elephants and Marshmallows" (subtitled "A Theoretical Synthesis of Incongruity-Resolution and Arousal Theories of humour"), and wrote that "jokes are nonsensical when they fail to completely resolve incongruities," and cited one of the many permutations of the elephant joke: "Why did the elephant sit on the marshmallow?" "Because he didn't want to fall into the cup of hot chocolate."

"The joke is incompletely resolved in their opinion," noted Elliott Oring, "because the situation is incompatible with the world as we know it. Certainly, elephants do not sit in cups of hot chocolate." Oring defined humour as not the resolution of incongruity, but "the perception of appropriate incongruity," that all jokes contain a certain amount of incongruity, and that absurd jokes require the additional component of an "absurd image," with an incongruity of the mental image.

== See also ==
- Cursed image
- Non sequitur
- Theatre of Cruelty
- Theatre of the absurd
