= Fresno nightcrawler =

Cryptid from Fresno, California

- 3D printed figures of the Fresno Nightcrawler

Creature information
- Folklore: Cryptid

Origin
- First attested: 2007
- Country: United States
- Region: Fresno, California

The Fresno nightcrawler is a cryptid said to originate in Fresno, California. It is described as semi-humanoid, white in color, long-legged, and claimed to be typically spotted in pairs. They have been compared to "walking pairs of pants". According to Brian Dunning, the Fresno nightcrawler is an urban legend, "supported by little or no actual belief by anyone that it's a real creature; there's nothing particularly thought-provoking in its backstory; and yet, it has a prodigious community of supporters that is only likely to continue growing".

== History ==
The Fresno nightcrawler was first popularized by CCTV footage shot in 2007 by a man in south Fresno, California, featured on the television network Univision. The video is claimed to show a white figure like a pair of legs without a torso walking from the top left to the bottom right of the screen, followed by a second figure walking in the same direction. The Fresno nightcrawler was featured on the History Channel program The Proof Is Out There.

Subsequent footage claimed to be of similar creatures was shot in Yosemite Lakes Park in 2011, and there have been claimed sightings as far away as Poland. The SyFy program Fact or Faked: Paranormal Files coined the name "nightcrawlers", and said its attempts to investigate if the footage was a hoax proved inconclusive. Images of alleged indigenous sculptures were put forward in an attempt to relate the Fresno nightcrawler to local Native American legends. However, when Weird Fresno founder Michael Banti contacted regional tribes to confirm their authenticity, his contacts did not recognize the photographed sculptures as matching local indigenous monuments.

== Popularity ==
The Fresno nightcrawler has become an icon of Fresno, and has spawned merchandise and fans around the world. According to enthusiasts, the nightcrawler is "super simple, uncomplicated, just a pair of pants out for a walk", which may account for the popularity of the creature.

== See also ==
- Cryptozoology
- List of cryptids
- List of urban legends
- Paranormal
- Preternatural
- Urban legends
