= The Anguished Man =

Supposedly haunted painting by an unknown artist

- Allegedly haunted painting
- Artist: Unknown
- Year: Unknown
- Medium: Oil on canvas, allegedly mixed with the artist's blood
- Owner: Sean Robinson

YouTube information
- Channel: The Anguished Man
- Years active: 2010–present
- Genres: Horror; Paranormal; Art
- Subscribers: 19.8 thousand
- Views: 4 million
- Last updated: August 2025

The Anguished Man is a painting by an unknown artist. Owned by Sean Robinson from Cumbria, England, Robinson claims to have inherited the painting from his grandmother, who told him that the artist who created the painting had mixed his own blood into the paint and died by suicide soon after finishing the work. The painting has been characterized as supposedly haunted or possibly a hoax.

== Background ==
The painting depicts a distorted, eyeless figure with an open mouth that appears to be screaming. The medium is oil on canvas, though details of its creation remain uncertain.

Robinson uploaded videos of the painting to his YouTube channel in 2010. He reported hearing crying noises, seeing mists form, and witnessing shadowy figures. He has further stated that the painting would occasionally fall without explanation and to have once seen "the figure of a man".

== Media coverage and skepticism ==
Skeptics have pointed out that all reported phenomena come exclusively from Robinson and his family, and that no independent investigation has verified the events.

Robinson later uploaded short YouTube clips filmed in his home, which purported to show the painting moving slightly, doors closing, and unexplained sounds. The videos sparked an online debate, with some viewers seeing them as proof of paranormal activity, while others dismissed them as hoaxes involving wires or editing tricks. Common explanations for the phenomena include the use of fishing line, camera manipulation, and the power of suggestion. Many paranormal enthusiasts have studied this painting such as Ian Lawman and John Blackburn.

In 2015, Robinson announced that La Brea Pictures was developing a film based on the story, with Finnish director Tii Ricks attached to the project. In 2016, rights were acquired to make a film based on the story of the painting. The film is to be titled ANGUISHED.

In the online art market, copies or forgeries of the painting have appeared on eBay, though Robinson has repeatedly stated that he would never sell the original.

== See also ==
- Body fluids in art
- The Crying Boy – Mass-produced print of painting by Bruno Amadio
- The Hands Resist Him – Painting by Bill Stoneham
- List of reportedly haunted paintings, works of art believed to be haunted or cursed
- Paranormal – Purported phenomena beyond the scope of normal scientific understanding
- Creepypasta – Horror-related media shared around the Internet
