= Huelga a la japonesa =

Urban legend from Spain and Latin America

Huelga a la japonesa (Spanish for "Japanese-style strike") is an urban legend from Spain and Latin America. The story explains that it is a phenomenon that emerged in Japan as a measure of union pressure in which the workers devote more effort and dedication to their tasks than normal, causing an overproduction that the owners of the industry can not distribute on the market, causing serious economic disruption.

The legend is based on the stereotype around the work culture of Japanese workers, which together with the relative remoteness of the country and its just in time production style, make it appear a credible story.
