= Haunchyville =

Mythical village of dwarfs

Haunchyville is a mythical village of dwarves in Waukesha County, Wisconsin, United States. It is rumored to be located near Mystic Drive in Muskego.

== History ==
Locals say that within the woods near Muskego, Wisconsin lives a conclave of little people, whose homes are built-to-scale and in the woods. In the mythical village is said to live an old man with albinism, who serves as their protector. Legend has it, if trespassers are caught, the unruly dwarves cut their legs from the knees down, so they are forced to live like one of them.

=== Origin ===
According to the legend, a large group of dwarves were forced into miserable life in the circus until they revolted. They killed the ringmaster, chopped off his limbs, and hanged what remained of him in a forest. The gang of dwarves, who detested certain circus performers, fled to Haunchyville, where dwarves continue to develop and defend a community exclusively for dwarves.

=== The Protector ===
The story goes that an old man lives among the dwarves. He is said to wait at the end of Mystic Drive, shotgun in hand to ward off anyone trying to cause trouble to the dwarves.

The story also goes that he first met the group of dwarves as a child. As a young boy, he accidentally stumbled upon Haunchyville and, since he instantly treated them as equals, they sheltered the young boy and raised him as one of their own. As he grew up, he notoriously defended the dwarves, often resorting to violence.

== In popular culture ==
In Punisher #16-17 (2002), Garth Ennis used the legend as basis for a two-part story in which "little people" formed their own mob and cut off their rival mobsters' legs from the knees down, as Haunchyville residents supposedly do to trespassers.
