= Choking Doberman =

Urban legend

The Choking Doberman is an urban legend that originated in the United States. The story involves a protective pet found by its owner gagging on human fingers lodged in its throat. As the story unfolds, the dog's owner discovers an intruder whose hand is bleeding from the dog bite.

Jan Harold Brunvand, a folklorist and professor emeritus of English at the University of Utah, wrote about this and other urban legends in his book The Choking Doberman and Other "New" Urban Legends published in 1984 by W.W. Norton & Company. He provided the reader with several varying accounts of the story. While the basic elements of the story remain the same in each version, the details, such as the number of fingers found, the breed of dog, and the condition of the intruder when discovered change slightly.

== The legend ==
A woman goes out for the evening with friends. Upon her return, she is greeted by her pet Doberman choking in the hallway. Alarmed, she takes the pet to the veterinarian. The vet announces that he must perform a tracheotomy on the animal and he will call her when he has news. When the woman arrives home, the vet calls and tells her to leave the house at once. The dog was choking on three human fingers. The woman calls the police, who search the house. They discover the burglar, hiding in a closet, passed out from blood loss caused by having three fingers bitten off.

=== Precursors ===
In his book Brunvard cites a fable about Llewellyn the Great and his loyal dog Gelert as the oldest possible influence on the story. In the original legend, Llewellyn leaves his young son at home with Gelert while on a hunting expedition. Upon Llewellyn's return, the dog greets him with a bloody face; thinking the animal has eaten his child, Llewellyn immediately draws his sword and kills Gelert. However, Llewellyn's son is soon found alive near the dead body of a wolf, revealing Gelert had actually saved the child from harm.

In her 1992 paper The Ambiguous Guardians, Adrienne Mayor cites the fifth century AD narrative The Omen of the Wolf as an earlier echo of both the Gelert fable and the urban legend as it is today. In this myth, the emperor Honorius's retinue was attacked by a pair of wolves. When the beasts were killed they were found to have a pair of human hands in their bellies. Their aggressive behavior—coupled with the awful last meal—were taken as a sinister sign and rumors lit a panic in Rome. The emperor's official propagandist, Claudian, attempted to counter the popular understanding of the sign with his poem The Gothic War.

=== First appearance in United States ===
The first verifiable appearance of the legend is in the Phoenix New Times on June 24, 1981.

From the article, in part:

Gagging Dog Story Baffles Police

It happened in Las Vegas. A woman returned from work and found her large dog, a Doberman, lying on the floor gasping for air. Concerned over the animal's welfare, she immediately loaded the pet into her car and drove him to a veterinarian.

...

According to the story, police arrived at her house and found an unconscious intruder, sans fingers, lying in a closet. New Times learned of the story from an employee of a large industrial plant in the Valley. He said he had gotten the story third hand from another employee who in turn had said he heard from a woman whose relatives in Las Vegas knew the dog's owner. As of Friday New Times was not able to nail down the identity of the Doberman's mistress.

According to a spokesman at the Las Vegas Sun, that paper, too, was very interested in breaking the story. Unfortunately, even though the story was all over Vegas last Thursday, the paper—and police—weren't able to dig up one shred of evidence to prove the incident ever occurred. "The police are baffled," the Sun spokesman said.

=== Variations ===
- The number of fingers dredged from the dog's throat varies, as does their color. In many tellings the race of the intruder goes unspecified, at times the discovered digits are described as "black" or "Mexican".
- Versions of the story from the 1980s commonly identified the dog as a Doberman. By the 1990s, the dog was more often depicted as a pit bull, reflecting shifts in media portrayals of the breed at the time. Variations of the story have included other dog breeds usually portrayed as large or intimidating, with the exception of a poodle in the Canadian television series Freaky Stories.
- The thief is usually discovered hiding in a closet, the bedroom, or in the basement, but in some tellings he gets away from the house and is only brought to justice when his injuries force him to visit an emergency room. His missing fingers identify him as the culprit police are looking for.
- With very few exceptions, the troubled dog owner is female. Moreover, the setting of the tale makes it very clear she lives alone.
- Most of the time, the dog's presence in the woman's life passes uncommented upon; nothing of the dog's history or her reasons for keeping him are mentioned. Occasionally, it is told the dog was given by her father when she went off to college in a distant city, or that in the wake of her divorce her lawyer recommended her getting a big dog for protection.

== Appearances and tie-ins outside the story ==
Ronald B. Tobias cites the story as an example of oral tradition that through repeated retelling has become plot perfect.

This story appears in the 1991 Judith Gorog novel On Meeting Witches at Wells.

The story also appears in Season 1, episode 1 of Mostly True Stories?: Urban Legends Revealed from 21:00 to 28:55.

== Books ==
- Encyclopedia of Urban Legends by Jan Harold Brunvand (ABC–CLIO, Inc. 2001) (ISBN 978-1-576-07532-6) (pp. 3-18)
- The Choking Doberman and Other "New" Urban Legends by Jan Harold Brunvand (W.W. Norton & Company, 1984) (ISBN 978-0-393-30321-6) (pp. 3-18)
- The Mexican Pet by Jan Harold Brunvand (W.W. Norton & Company, 1986) (ISBN 0-393-30542-2) (pp. 41-47)
- Too Good To Be True by Jan Harold Brunvand (W.W. Norton & Company, 1999) (ISBN 0-393-04734-2) (pp. 51-52)
- Tales, Rumors and Gossip by Gail de Vos (Libraries Unlimited, 1996) (ISBN 1-56308-190-3) (pp. 208-213)
- The Book of Nasty Legends by Paul Smith (Routledge & Kegan Paul, 1983) (ISBN 0-00-636856-5) (p. 98)
- On Meeting Witches at Wells by Judith Gorog (Philomel, October 11, 1991) (ISBN 978-0399218033)
