= Crybaby Bridge =

Nickname given to some bridges

Crybaby Bridge refers to numerous bridges across the United States, associated with urban legends and ghost stories involving the sounds of a baby crying. These tales typically involve tragic backstories of infanticide, accidents, or other sorrowful events that purportedly occurred at or near the bridges, for example, an urban legend relating to a baby or young child/children where the mother threw her baby off the bridge and felt so bad that she killed herself. She now looks for her baby while crying in the river sadly. The phenomenon is not limited to a specific location, but represents a type of folklore that has become embedded in the cultural fabric of various regions, each adapting the legend to fit local histories or landscapes.

== Kentucky ==
A bridge on Sleepy Hollow Road near the border between Jefferson and Oldham counties in Kentucky was known as Crybaby Bridge. Reportedly, mothers would drop their unwanted, sick, or deformed babies off the bridge to drown in the water, and their crying can still be heard there. The original bridge has been replaced by a newer one made of steel and concrete. The bridge is one of several rumors about locations along Sleepy Hollow Road.

== Ohio ==
=== Egypt Road, Salem ===
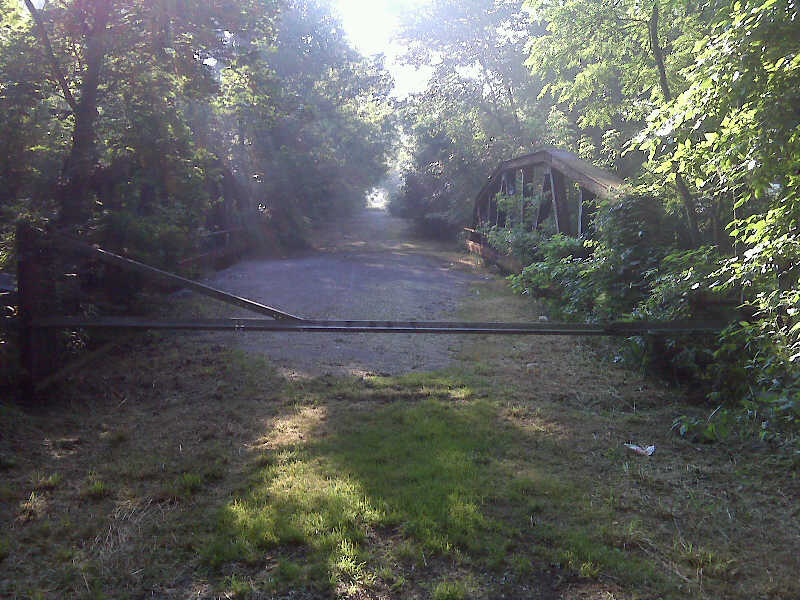
Crybaby Bridge off Egypt Road

Although the bridge is off of Egypt Road near Salem, Ohio, it is actually on what used to be West Pine Lake Roads, which now dead-ends to the east of the bridge. Legends attribute the crying baby to one that fell in and accidentally drowned. There is also a rumor that there is a cult of some sort in the woods surrounding the bridge. In 2010, there was a murder of an elderly woman that was found, strangled to death, and burned just off the bridge.

Map: 40.929744°N 80.829978°W

== Maryland ==
In Weird Maryland: Your Travel Guide to Maryland's Local Legends and Best Kept Secrets, authors Matt Lake, Mark Moran, and Mark Sceurman include three first-person narratives of crybaby bridge experiences in Maryland. The locations mentioned are the Governor's Bridge Road bridge, one on Lottsford Road, and a third unspecified but possibly described a Lottsford Vista Road bridge as well. The latter narratives make mention of purported Satanic churches near the bridge and the appearance of the Goatman.

== Texas ==
=== De Kalb ===
"Crybaby Bridge", or "Spook Bridge", located about 25 miles west of Texarkana, runs across county road 4230, located 4 miles south of De Kalb, Texas. Legend says that a mother driving a car plunged into the creek, and the baby drowned in the near-freezing waters.

=== Lufkin ===
Jack Creek, a stream west of Lufkin, Texas, has for years been known as Cry Baby Creek, supposedly because a woman and a baby died when their auto veered off a wooden bridge and fell into the steep creek. Annette Sawyer of Lufkin said visitors who come to the site at night claim they have heard sounds resembling a baby crying. One visitor supposedly found the imprint of a baby's hand on her auto window after returning from the bridge.

=== Port Neches ===
"Sarah Jane Bridge" on East Port Neches Avenue in Port Neches, Texas, is said to be the bridge from which a baby of the same name was thrown into the alligator-infested water by a man who had murdered the child's mother. It is said Sarah Jane can be heard crying from the water when one stands on the bridge on hot summer nights. The child's mother, a headless ghost wandering the woods nearby, can also be heard whispering "Sarah Jane" as she searches the forest with a lantern. The legendary Sarah Jane is Sarah Jane Block, who lost no children and lived to the age of 99.

== Controversy ==
In 1999, Maryland folklorist Jesse Glass presented a case against several crybaby bridges being genuine folklore, contending that they were instead fakelore that was knowingly being propagated through the internet.

According to Glass, nearly identical stories of crybaby bridges in Maryland and Ohio began to appear online in 1999, but they could not be confirmed through local oral history or the media.

Among Glass' examples was the story of a bridge located in Westminster, Maryland, which concerned the murder of escaped slaves and African American children. It's located specifically on Rockland Road, just off of Uniontown Road outside of Westminster's city limits past Rt. 31. In the 1800s, the story held, unwanted black babies were drowned by being thrown off this bridge. Regional newspapers, such as the American Sentinel and the Democratic Advocate, which usually covered racially motivated murders of the period, make no mention of the events described online.

However, in their book Weird U.S.: Your Travel Guide to America's Local Legends and Best Kept Secrets, authors Mark Moran and Mark Sceurman relate the story of a purported crybaby bridge on Lottsford Vista Road between Bowie and Upper Marlboro, asserting that this bridge has "made believers out of many skeptics." The text included from their informant makes no mention of escaped slaves but does repeat a familiar component of such legends: an out-of-wedlock birth.

== See also ==
- Overtoun Bridge

== Sources ==
- Mark Moran and Mark Scuerman (2004). Weird U.S.: Your Travel Guide to America's Local Legends and Best Kept Secrets. Barnes & Noble. ISBN 978-0-7607-5043-8.
