= Cursed image =

Images perceived as mysterious or disturbing

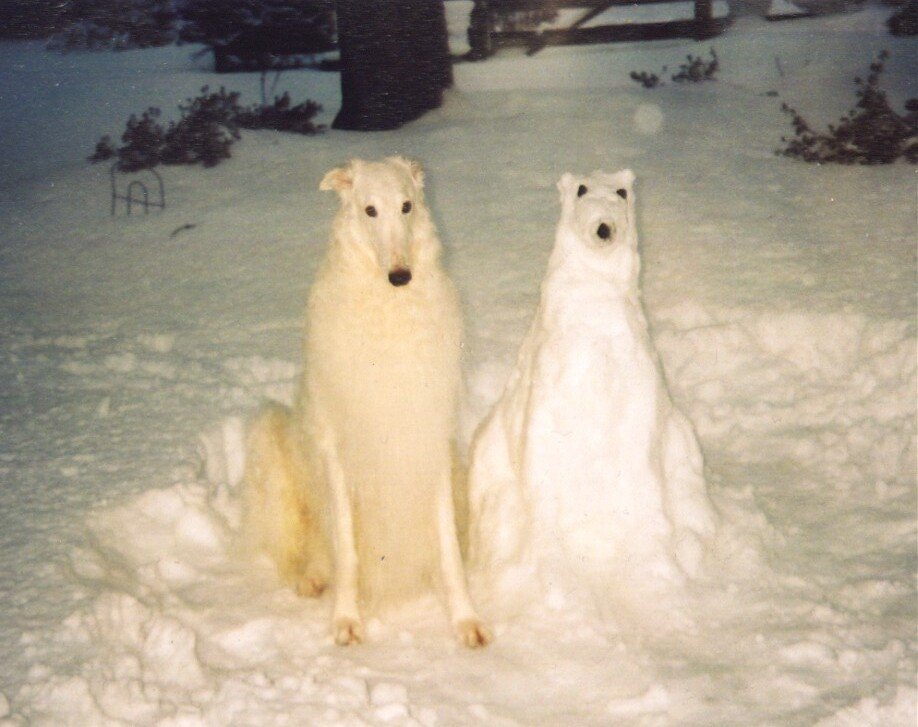
A photo of a borzoi next to a snowman shaped like a borzoi, shared on the @cursedimages Twitter account in 2016

A cursed image refers to a picture (usually a photograph) that is perceived as mysterious or disturbing due to its content, poor quality, or a combination of the two. A cursed image is intended to make a person question the reason for the image's existence in the first place. The term was coined on social media in 2015 and popularised the following year.

== History ==
The concept of "cursed images" originates from a Tumblr blog, cursedimages, in 2015. The first image posted by the account shows an elderly farmer surrounded by crates of red tomatoes in a wood-paneled room. In a 2019 interview with Paper, the blog's owner described the aforementioned image as follows: "It's the perfect cursed image to me because there's nothing inherently unsettling about any part of it. It's a totally mundane moment transformed into something else by the camera and the new context I've given it."

While the term "cursed image" had been used on Tumblr since 2015, it became more widely popularized by July 2016 due to the Twitter account @cursedimages. In a 2016 interview with Gizmodo writer Hudson Hongo, the owner of the account explained that he had seen "one or two" posts on Tumblr containing "unexplainable and odd" pictures that were simply captioned "cursed image". Intrigued by the pictures, the owner of the account began searching for similar images and after finding more photographs in that vein, decided to "post them all in one place". That same year, Brian Feldman of New York magazine interviewed Doug Battenhausen, the owner of the Tumblr blog internethistory, which also posts "cursed images". Feldman asked Battenhausen about the appeal of "cursed images", to which Battenhausen replied: "It's a lot of things. It's the mystery of the photo, it's the strange aesthetics of them, it's seeing a place that you've never seen before, or an intimate glimpse into somebody's life."

Feldman attributes the "cursed" aesthetic to the nature of digital photography in the early 2000s, where point-and-shoot cameras lacked modern filters and were often used with "blaring" flash, and where a photo would be taken more for archival purposes than performative social media sharing. Feldman regards such photography as "not old enough to scan as 'vintage', but not well-manicured enough to be recognizable as contemporary", and sees this as an instance of the uncanny valley.

The opposite of a cursed image is a "blessed image." The term "blursed image" has also been popularized, particularly on the social media platform Reddit, combining the words blessed and cursed to describe images that could fit into both categories.

== See also ==
- Creepypasta
- Dark humour
- Derealization
- Glitch art
- List of haunted paintings
- Non-sequitur
- Surrealism
