= Jan Harold Brunvand =

American folklorist (born 1933)

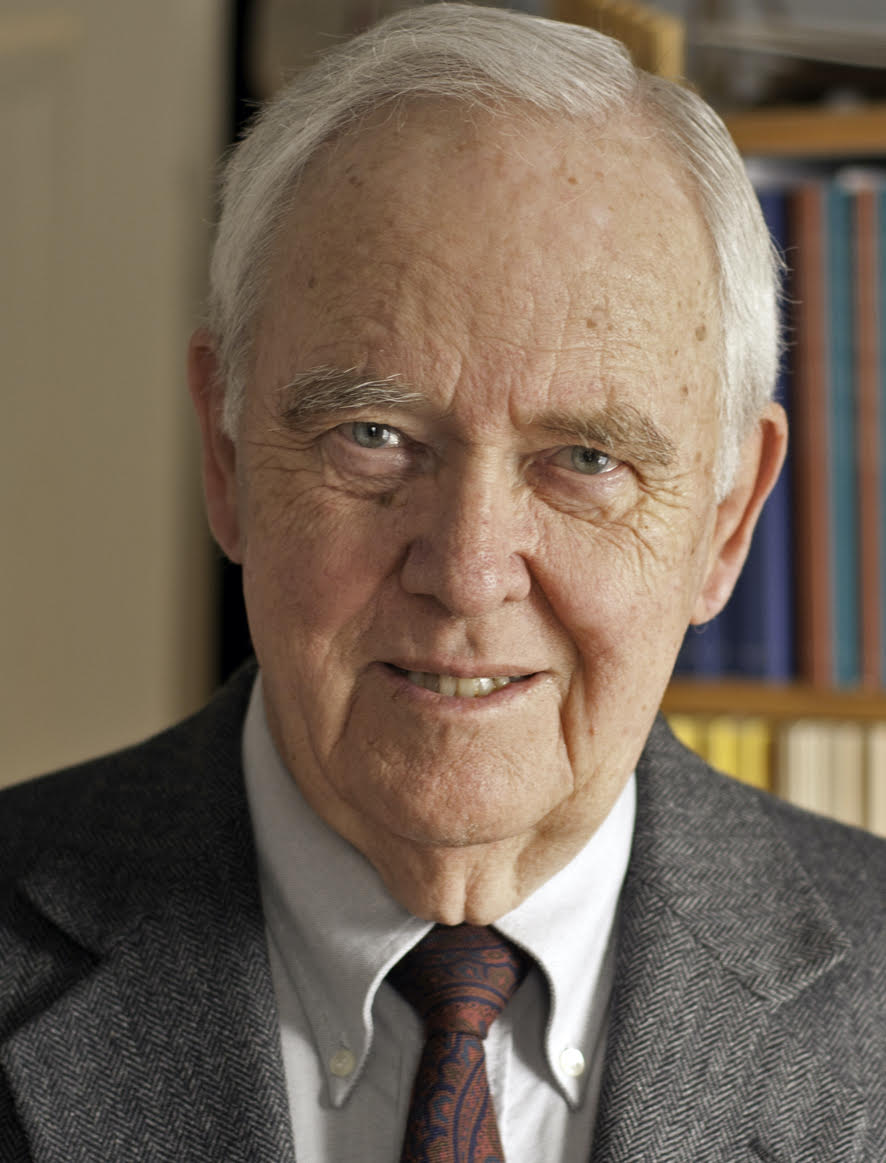
- Brunvand in 2023
- Born: March 23, 1933 (age 93); Cadillac, Michigan, U.S.
- Occupations: Professor; urban legends researcher
- Spouse: Judith Brunvand (m. 1956)
- Awards: Guggenheim fellow 1970; Fulbright scholar, 1970–1971

Academic background
- Education: Indiana University; Michigan State University
- Thesis: The Taming of the Shrew: A Comparative Study of Oral and Literary Versions (1961)
- Doctoral advisor: Richard Dorson

Academic work
- Discipline: Folklorist
- Institutions: University of Utah; Southern Illinois University; University of Idaho
- Notable works: The Vanishing Hitchhiker; The Study of American Folklore: An Introduction

Jan Harold Brunvand (born March 23, 1933) is an American retired folklorist, researcher, writer, public speaker, and professor emeritus of English at the University of Utah.

Brunvand is best known for popularizing the concept of the urban legend, a form of modern folklore or story telling. Urban legends are "too good to be true" stories that travel by word of mouth, by print, or by the internet and are attributed to an FOAF: friend of a friend. "Urban legends," Brunvand says, "have a persistent hold on the imagination because they have an element of suspense or humor, they are plausible and they have a moral."

Though criticized for the "popular" rather than "academic" orientation of his books, The Vanishing Hitchhiker and others, Brunvand felt that it was a "natural and worthwhile part of his job as a folklorist to communicate the results of his research to the public."

For his lifetime dedication to the field of folklore, which included radio and television appearances, a syndicated newspaper column, and over 100 publications (articles, books, notes and reviews), Brunvand is considered to be "the legend scholar with the greatest influence on twentieth-century media."

== Early life and education ==
Brunvand was born on March 23, 1933, in Cadillac, Michigan, to Norwegian immigrants Harold N. Brunvand and Ruth Brunvand. He and his two siblings, Tor and Richard, were brought up in Lansing, Michigan. Brunvand graduated from J. W. Sexton High School in Lansing in 1951.

From high school, Brunvand attended Michigan State University in East Lansing, Michigan, where, in 1955, he earned a Bachelor of Arts degree in journalism. While at Michigan State, he attended a Reserve Officers' Training Corps program and was commissioned a 2nd Lieutenant upon graduation. Brunvand went on to earn a Master of Arts degree in English from the same university in 1957. He briefly served in the U.S. Army Signal Corps at Fort Monmouth and was discharged with the rank of 1st Lieutenant.

== Academic career ==
While attending Michigan State, Brunvand met Richard Dorson, a folklorist and professor, who became a mentor. Brunvand took an undergraduate American Folklore course Dorson offered in the fall quarter of 1954 and, in subsequent semesters, completed two of Dorson's graduate courses in folklore as a special enrollee. The work Brunvand and other classmates did for Dorson's classes included "preparing a large and well organized personal collection of folklore garnered from oral tradition and furnished with informant data and background comments." These papers would later serve as the beginnings of a large archive of folklore housed at Indiana University.

On June 10, 1956, Brunvand married Judith Darlene Ast, also a student at Michigan State University. Four days later, the couple left for Oslo, Norway, where Brunvand attended the University of Oslo on a Fulbright scholarship. He spent the year studying folklore. He started publishing in academic publications during this period, notably a paper on Norwegian-American folklore in the archives of Indiana University and one about the Norwegian folk hero Askeladden. In 1957, Brunvand returned to the United States as a graduate student at Indiana University, Bloomington, Indiana. He switched majors, from English to folklore, and took a series of classes offered through the university's summer institute. He worked as an archivist in the Indiana University Folklore Archives from September 1958 to June 1960. During this time, he met Archer Taylor, who, as a visiting professor, taught a course on proverbs and riddles. This course, according to Brunvand, "changed his life." Proverbs became one of Brunvand's favorite topics to study and discuss. In 1961, Brunvand's A Dictionary of Proverbs and Proverbial Phrases from Books Published by Indiana Authors Before 1890 was published as Number 15 of the Indiana University's Folklore Series. Of the book, Brunvand says two things: "I've become better at choosing titles since then," and "The price was $3.00, and it was worth every penny of it.

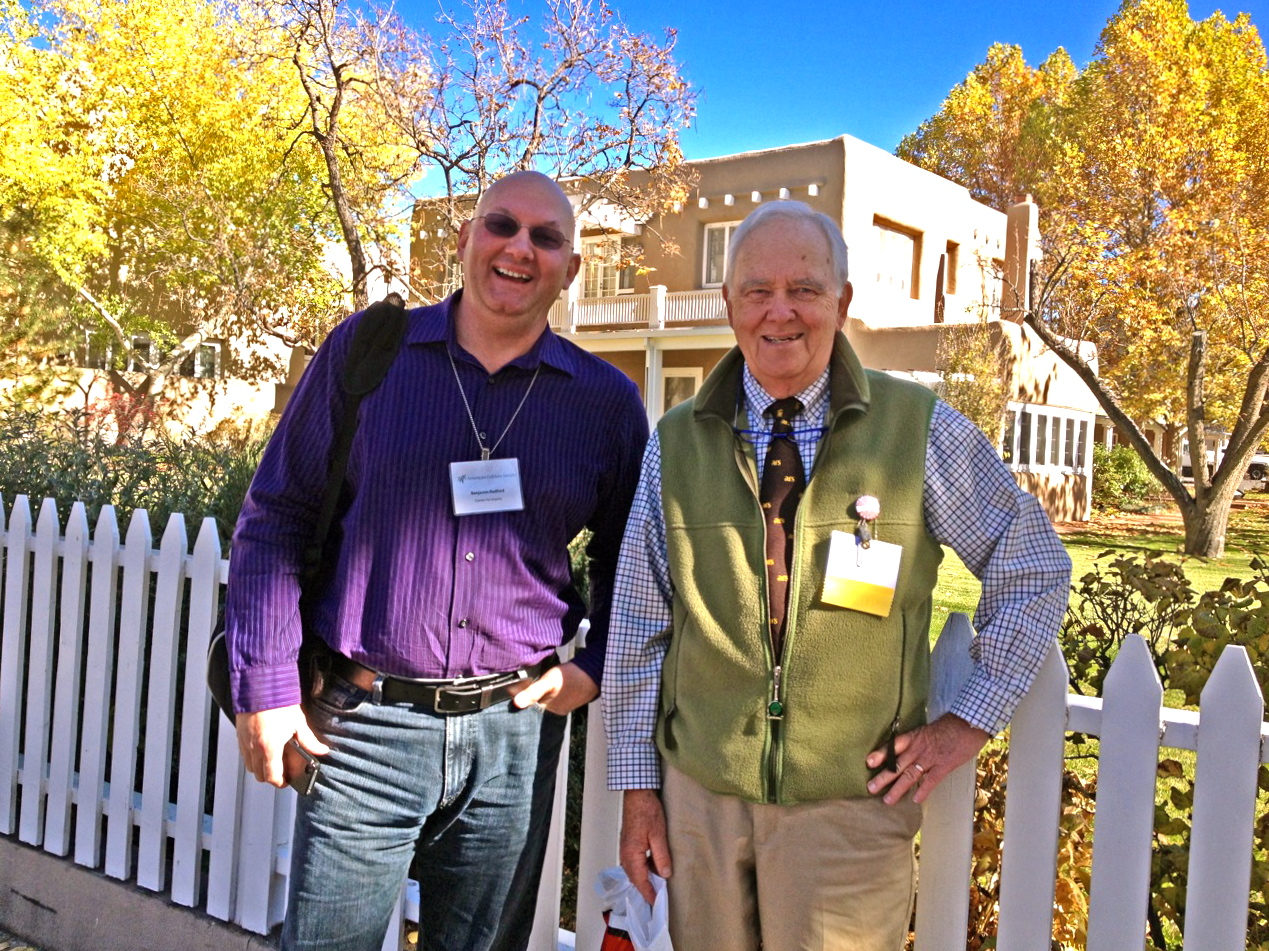
Benjamin Radford and Jan Brunvand at the 2014 American Folklore Society conference in Santa Fe, New Mexico

In 1961, Brunvand also received a Ph.D. in folklore from Indiana University. His dissertation, The Taming of the Shrew: A Comparative Study of Oral and Literary Versions (Aarne-Thompson type 901), later published by Routledge in 1991, highlighted his interest in the structure, morphology and typology of the folktale.

Brunvand taught at the University of Idaho, Moscow, Idaho, from 1961 to 1965. He served as associate editor of the Journal of American Folklore from 1963 to 1967.

In 1965, Brunvand taught for a year at Southern Illinois University, Edwardsville, Illinois, focusing on folktales, folklore and literature, before moving with his wife and four children to the University of Utah, Salt Lake City, Utah, where he remained a professor until his retirement in 1996.

By 1967, Brunvand was a member of the Rocky Mountain Modern Language Association. He had also served as Book Review Editor for the Journal of American Folklore, which he resigned after receiving a Fulbright Scholarship research grant in 1970 to study folklore in Romania. He also won a Guggenheim Fellowship in the Humanities (Folklore and Popular Culture) that same year. Throughout the next decade, Brunvand focused his research on Romanian folklore, with a particular interest in Romanian house decoration. He returned to Romania in 1973-74 and again in 1981, receiving grants from the International Research & Exchanges Board (IREX) to continue his studies. His research would later be published in a single volume collection titled Casa Frumoasa: The House Beautiful in Rural Romania, published by East European Monographs in 2003.

In 1968, The Study of American Folklore: An Introduction was published by W.W. Norton and Company. Brunvand received an Honorable Mention for this book in a 1969 Chicago Folklore Prize competition. The Chicago Folklore Prize is "supported by an endowment established by the International Folklore Association and is awarded annually by the University of Chicago for an important contribution to the study of folklore."

Brunvand's A Guide for Collectors of Folklore in Utah was published by Utah Publications in the American West in 1971.

In the years 1973 to 1976, Brunvand, again, took on the role of associate editor for the Journal of American Folklore. He was named Folklore Fellow by the American Folklore Society in 1974 and was elected president of the organization in 1985.

From 1977 to 1980, Brunvand served as editor of the Journal of American Folklore, with the goal of making the journal more readable and useful to its major audience, American folklorists. He widened the scope of the journal by including articles written by those outside folklore, but whose work was "relevant to that being done by professional folklorists." He wanted to emphasize folklore and literature, folklore and history, folklife, festival and modern folklore.

In 1976, Brunvand's book Folklore: A Study and Research Guide was published by St. Martin's Press. The book, intended for undergraduate folklore students, was a research tool with a bibliographic guide and tips for researching term papers.

Brunvand edited two other textbooks: Readings in American Folklore, published by W.W. Norton and Company in 1979, American Folklore: An Encyclopedia, published by Garland in 1996.

== "Mr. Urban Legend" ==
While teaching folklore at the University of Utah, Brunvand noticed a disconnect with his students and their views toward folklore. "They always seemed to think that folklore belonged to somebody else, usually in the past, that was something quaint and outdated." He began asking his students to think about and discuss stories from their own lives. These stories helped form the basis of a collection which Brunvand later included in several popular books on the topic of urban legends. In 1981, Brunvand's first book devoted to urban legends was published. The Vanishing Hitchhiker: American Urban Legends and Their Meanings helped to popularize the topic for a student audience. Urban legends, Brunvand explains, are "kissing cousins of myths, fairy tales and rumors. Legends differ from rumors because the legends are stories, with a plot. And unlike myths and fairy tales, they are supposed to be current and true, events rooted in everyday reality that at least could happen." Urban legends reflect modern-day societal concerns, hopes and fears, but are "weird whoppers we tell one another, believing them to be factual."

Over the next two decades, Brunvand added to the collection with "new" urban legends: The Choking Doberman and Other "New" Urban Legends, The Big Book of Urban Legends (which was formatted as a comic book), The Mexican Pet: More "New" Urban Legends, Curses! Broiled Again!, The Baby Train: And Other Lusty Urban Legends, Too Good to be True: The Colossal Book of Urban Legends, and The Truth Never Stands in the Way of a Good Story!. He made several appearances on Late Night with David Letterman and, in 1987, began a twice-weekly syndicated newspaper column called Urban Legends. He participated in countless radio talk shows and dozens of press interviews, educating people about this pass-along folk narrative that, typically involves people misunderstanding or making false assumptions about a story they heard. They forget details and fill in the gaps by inventing what they are missing to make sense of the story. Though criticized for the popular orientation of his books, Brunvand was dedicated to publicizing the field of folklore, exploring the roots of the stories, where possible, and, in some cases debunking them. "Folklorists fill different educational roles," Brunvand told members of The Missouri Folklore Society in 2003, "sometimes in classrooms, but often in a more public forum. I believe that the public and media image of what a folklorist does is in fact part of what we should be doing, whether we were trained specifically for it or not, whether we work in academe or not, and whether we like it or not."

Brunvand and his books became so popular, that, when Richard Wolkomir dubbed him "Mr. Urban Legend" in an article for the Smithsonian, the title was later added to book jackets and other publicity. In an article for Western Folklore, Brunvand mentioned a notice he found on a computer newsgroup dated 1 March 1989, presumably an insider's joke: "I think Jan Harold Brunvand, alleged author of The Choking Doberman, is an urban legend. Has anybody ever actually seen this guy?" A Harvard Lampoon publication, Mediagate, parodied urban legend books with this fake publisher's notice: "Bookman Publishing's Catalog for Fall '87: The Embarrassing Fart and More New Urban Legends by Jan Harold Brunvand. Yet another set of rumors, tall tales, and fourth-hand hearsay compiled by the author of The Vanishing Hitchhiker. Includes more recent urban legends such as the Senile President, the Adulterous Evangelist, and the Smelly Gym Sock in the Big Mac. 233 pages hardbound. $34.95 (Harvard 1988: 229)."

== Post-retirement career ==
Brunvand retired from the University of Utah in 1996, but continued doing some research and writing as professor emeritus of English.

He frequently writes for publications dedicated to skiing, vintage automobiles and fly fishing. Once in a while, Brunvand's hobbies and academic interests intersect, notably with an article in The American Fly Fisher debunking a fake quotation by Thoreau. He writes a series of columns on Seniors Skiing.com.

Brunvand was a guest on National Public Radio's All Things Considered in September 1999. He spoke to Noah Adams about his book Too Good to be True: The Colossal Book of Urban Legends.

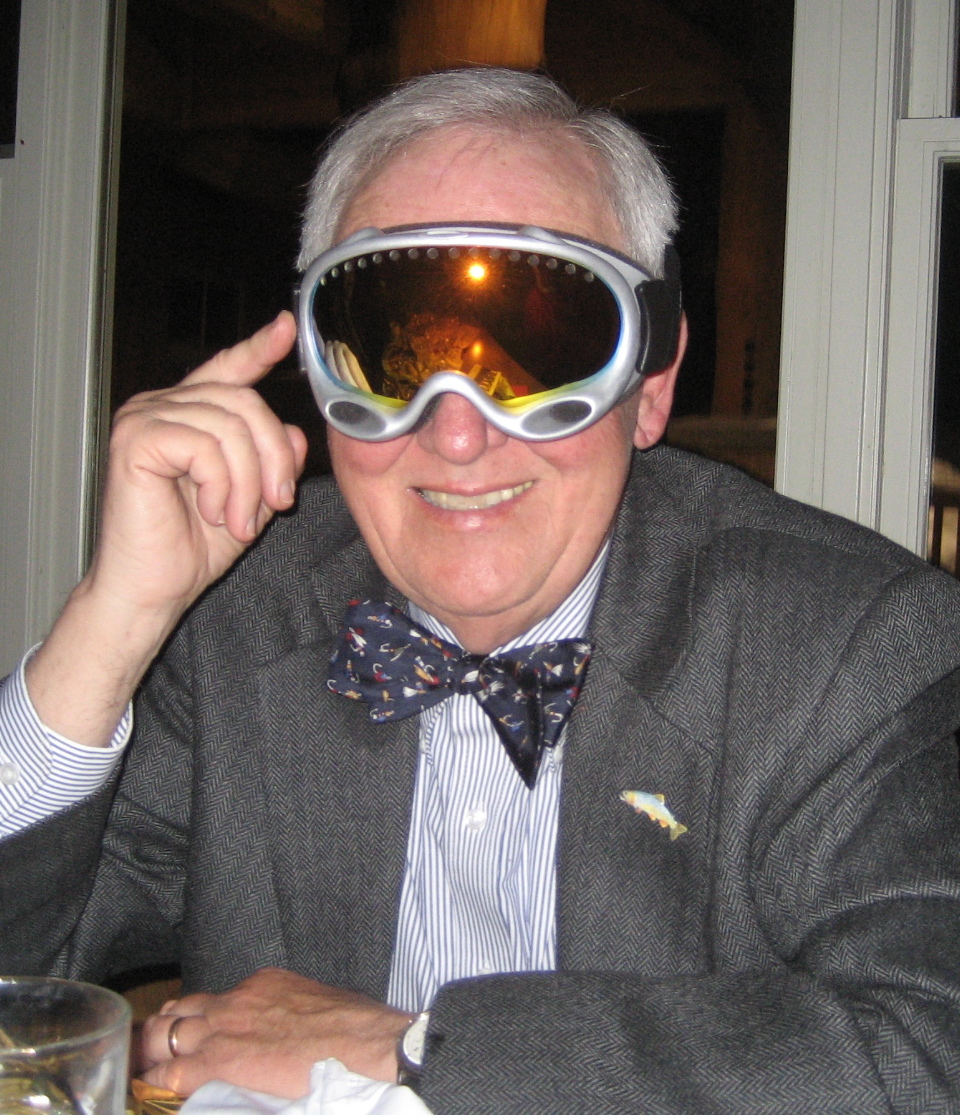
Jan Harold Brunvand trying on a pair of ski goggles on his 75th birthday

His Encyclopedia of Urban Legends, illustrated by Randy Hickman, was published by ABC-CLIO in 2001.

He gave the keynote address at the 2003 meeting of the Missouri Folklore Society. He was a speaker at the World Skeptics Congress in Italy in 2004. His is a fellow of the Committee for Skeptical Inquiry, formerly known as the Committee for the Scientific Investigation of Claims of the Paranormal. In 2003 Brunvand was awarded CSICOP's Distinguished Skeptic Award.

Brunvand's book Be Afraid, Be Very Afraid: The Book of Scary Urban Legends was published in 2004 by W.W. Norton and Company.

== Personal ==
In 2003, Brunvand entered the Trout Bum Tournament sponsored by Fly Rod and Reel. He participated in the Solo-Angler category. Known during the tournament as the Vanishing Fly Fisher (a nod to his book, The Vanishing Hitchhiker), Brunvand spent 10 days alone fishing some of his favorite spots in Utah: Mammoth Creek, Gooseberry Creek, Price River, and Antimony River (where he "fell twice and bashed his knee, though the injury wasn't anything a cold towel and a cold beer wouldn't fix"). "Day 10," Jim Reilly wrote in an article describing the competition," was the last we heard from Jan. We assume he made it home, but maybe he...vanished."

His favorite hobbies are fly fishing and skiing. He and his wife, Judith, continue to reside in Salt Lake City, Utah.

== Popular books about urban legends ==
=== The Vanishing Hitchhiker ===
The Vanishing Hitchhiker: American Urban Legends and Their Meanings is a book intended to introduce the idea of urban legends to the general public. Included in the book are such chilling and humorous stories as "The Vanishing Hitchhiker," "The Economical Car," "The Ghost Airliner," "The Girl with the Beehive Hairdo," "The Solid Cement Cadillac," and "The Killer in the Back Seat." Brunvand's approach, according to reviewer Janet L. Langlois, "sensitizes the reader in a highly readable and effective way to both the dynamic narrative process in an urban context and the discipline of folklore and folklife studies." Some of these stories previously appeared in an article Brunvand wrote for the June 1980 issue of Psychology Today. As with Heard About the Solid Cement Cadillac or the Nude in the Camper?, Brunvand categorizes the different legends included in The Vanishing Hitchhiker into classic urban legend types. For each legend type, Brunvand offers samples that show variations on the legends themselves, historical evidence of how the legend may have originated (often with European or East Asian roots), and an explanation of what the legend might mean in an urban or modern context.

Although recognized by critics for its usefulness as an introductory volume and reference point for expanding the field of folklore, reviewers cautioned that The Vanishing Hitchhiker lacked the depth necessary for people actively researching urban legends. Janet L. Langlois, for example, wondered what criteria Brunvand used in selecting stories for the book, as well as what made the legends American, urban and modern. Reviewer Gary Alan Fine wrote, "The paperback edition makes an excellent supplementary reading for introductory folklore students. It's all good fun, and Brunvand, folklore's Carl Sagan, should thrive and prosper, letting the all-purpose intelligentsia know that folklore is just as much fun as interplanetary travel and not nearly as expensive." To this, Brunvand countered: "I really won't think I have arrived until they refer to Carl Sagan as 'The Jan Brunvand of astronomy.'"

=== The Choking Doberman ===
Patricia T. O'Connor, writer for The New York Times, described The Choking Doberman and Other "New" Urban Legends as "a collection of 'urban legends,' fictitious narratives that are passed from person to person in the guise of true stories and sometimes persist until they reach the status of folklore." These stories are bizarre but believable and often attributed to a friend of a friend (FOAF). Like in his book, The Vanishing Hitchhiker, Brunvand provided the reader with a survey of urban legends, stories such as "The Choking Doberman," "The Poison Dress," and "The Death of Little Mikey." Each story, with its accompanying variations, are categorized into themes and motifs: victimized women and children, food and beverage contamination, fearful encounters, sexual embarrassment, and humorous retribution.

Though Robert D. Bethke called The Choking Doberman "the kind of work one immediately wants to share with friends," he also criticized the work for the "rhetorical devises" Brunvand used "apparently to suit the popular market." Critics also pointed out that Brunvand's urban legend books raise a question about race and stereotypes that, to some, are left unaddressed. Bethke wrote "We are told that the stories are projective of American popular culture, but precisely what racial segment of the culture participates in the currency of such stories? Specifically, we are dealing with a phenomenon like the ethnic joke, examples of which are told by target groups, or is the urban legend essentially a mainstream occurrence? I don't think the final word has been written yet on the genre, but Jan Brunvand has made admirable strides toward that end."

=== The Mexican Pet: "New" Urban Legends ===
The Mexican Pet: "New" Urban Legends is Brunvand's third book in a series of books about urban legends meant to appeal to a general audience. This time, Brunvand includes stories collected from colleagues, students, professional newscasters and appeals through his own publications, lectures and media appearances. He organized the book in thematic categories: animal stories, automobiles, horrors, contaminations, sex and scandal, crime, and products, professionals and personalities. There are new versions of earlier legends, newly obtained pieces and leftovers from his files. Among the stories included in the book are: "The Mexican Pet," "Cabbage Patch Kids' death certificates," "The Green Stamps." Many of the stories have been disseminated through print and broadcast media.

Brunvand wrote in a 2003 article, "Nowadays it would be naive to ask for mere press releases and print articles when most people turn to websites and on-line databases for information." He recognized that urban legend reference sites, like Snopes.com provide readers with far more timely examples and current information than he could keep up with in his books.

== Academic books on American folklore ==
=== The Study of American Folklore. An Introduction ===
The Study of American Folklore. An Introduction is a book intended for students of folklore with a particular emphasis on American Folklore as transmitted in the English language. For the purposes of this book, Brunvand defines folklore as "those materials in culture that circulate traditionally among members of any group in different versions, whether in oral form or by means of customary example." The book is divided into three main categories: verbal (dialect and speech habits, proverbs, riddles, tales, rhymes, folk-songs, ballads), partly verbal (superstitions, customs, dances, plays), and non-verbal (gestures, music, handcrafts, folk architecture, food). Within the text, Brunvand provided for the reader information on data collecting methods, a general assessment of folklore material, bibliographic essays, and extensive lists of books and articles. To some, like reviewer Elliott Oring, the classification system used by Brunvand made The Study of American Folklore more of an "index" of American folklore rather than a "study" of it. Reviewer Kenneth Laine Ketner criticized the book for its failure to make explicit the background theory used to evaluate the works and classification system included in the book, contradictions in detail and narrative, its authoritarian tone, and its charismatic or arbitrary approach to knowledge with serious ethnocentric biases. Peter Tokofsky, in his article Introducing Folklore: A Review Essay, suggested that "the longevity and, presumably, continuing strong sales of the Brunvand text seems to confirm that introducing folklore by way of genres remains an effective and, for many, a preferred teaching tool even if it does not reflect the most current theoretical perspectives."

=== American Folklore: An Encyclopedia ===
American Folklore: An Encyclopedia is an illustrated volume that contains within its pages more than 500 articles covering American and Canadian folklore and folklife. Subject areas include holidays, festivals, rituals to crafts, music, dance and occupations. The book provides short bibliographies and cross-references for further research.

== Selected works ==
- A Dictionary of Proverbs and Proverbial Phrases from Books Published by Indiana Authors Before 1890, compiled by Jan Harold Brunvand (Indiana University Press 1961) (ISBN 978-0-253-38015-9)
- The Study of American Folklore: An Introduction (W.W. Norton & Company 1968, revised 1978, 1986, 1998) (ISBN 978-0-393-97223-8)
- A Guide for Collectors of Folklore in Utah (University of Utah Press 1971)
- Norwegian Settlers in Alberta (Canadian Centre for Folk Cultural Studies 1974)
- Folklore: A Study and Research Guide (St. Martin's Press 1976) (ISBN 978-0-312-29750-3)
- Readings in American Folklore, edited by Jan Harold Brunvand (W.W. Norton & Company 1979) (ISBN 978-0-393-95029-8)
- The Vanishing Hitchhiker: American Urban Legends and Their Meanings (W.W. Norton 1981) (ISBN 978-0-393-95169-1)
- The Choking Doberman and Other "New" Urban Legends (W.W. Norton & Company 1984) (ISBN 978-0-393-30321-6)
- The Mexican Pet: More "New" Urban Legends and Some Old Favorites (W.W. Norton & Company 1986) (ISBN 978-0-393-30542-5)
- Curses! Broiled Again! The Hottest Urban Legends Going (W.W. Norton & Company 1989) (ISBN 978-0-393-30711-5)
- The Taming of the Shrew: A Comparative Study of Oral and Literary Versions (Routledge 1991) (ISBN 978-0-8240-7149-3)
- The Baby Train and Other Lusty Urban Legends (W.W. Norton & Company 1993) (ISBN 978-0-393-03438-7)
- The Big Book of Urban Legends (Paradox Press 1994) (ISBN 978-1-563-89165-6)
- American Folklore: An Encyclopedia, edited by Jan Harold Brunvand (Taylor & Francis 1996) (ISBN 978-0-8153-0751-8)
- Too Good to Be True: The Colossal Book of Urban Legends (W.W. Norton & Company 1999, revised 2001) (ISBN 978-0-393-32088-6)
- The Truth Never Stands in the Way of a Good Story (University of Illinois Press 2000) (ISBN 978-0-252-07004-4)
- Encyclopedia of Urban Legends (ABC-CLIO, Inc. 2001) (ISBN 978-1-576-07532-6)
- Casa Frumoasa: The House Beautiful in Rural Romania (Columbia University Press 2003) (ISBN 978-0-880-33528-7)
- Be Afraid, Be Very Afraid: The book of scary Urban Legends (W.W. Norton & Company 2004) (ISBN 978-0-393-32613-0)
