= Baby Train =

Urban legend

The Baby Train, or simply Baby Train, is an urban legend told in the United States, United Kingdom and Australia. The legend first appeared in Christopher Morley's 1939 novel Kitty Foyle. According to the legend, a certain small town had an unusually high birth rate. This was allegedly caused by a freight train passing through the town and blowing its whistle, waking up all the residents. Since it was too late to go back to sleep and too early to get up, couples would have sex. This resulted in a mini-baby boom.

== Legend ==
One version of the myth, as written down by the Australian author and folklorist Bill Scott in The Long & The Short & The Tall: a collection of Australian yarns tells the story of a little town on the coast, not too far north of Sydney, where the birth rate was three times the average for all the rest of Australia. This was so unusual the Government sent someone out to the town to investigate the cause for the high birth rate.

When the official arrived, he found children everywhere he looked. "Even the local school had those temporary classrooms all over the place to fit them in and they had a special maternity wing at the local hospital." The man was mystified for a while. The people there did not seem different from people in other small towns, so he couldn't understand why they got three times as many children. After a few nights in the town, the man figured it out.

This particular town was right by the main railway line. The train was delivering mail right past the town, and thus blew its whistle when it stopped. Since it was too early to get up and it was too late to go back to sleep again, the adults had to find something to do in bed while waiting. This then led to the very high birth rates.

Other versions of the myth vary to different degrees. Sometimes the small town is in America or England, and one version tells of noisy foghorns rather a than train whistle.

=== Similar myths and actual events ===
The story is related to the rumour that birth rates spiked nine months after the Northeast Blackout of 1965, the actual birthrate increase in Boston after February 1969 nor'easter, the September 11 attacks, and other natural disasters and similar events. It is based on the premise that when regular life is disrupted adults will resort to sex as occupation without regard for family planning or protection.

=== Background ===
- In 1939, Baby Train was mentioned in Christopher Morley's novel Kitty Foyle: "The first thing you hear mornings in Manitou is the early Q train to Chicago. It's too early to get up and too late to go to sleep again. They have a legend out there that the morning yells of that rattler do a good deal to keep up the birth-rate."
- In 1944, the story was published in The New Anecdota Americana: Five Hundred Stories for America's Amusement.
- In 1946, it appeared in A Collection of Jokes and Anecdotes by Bennett Cerf: "A visitor to "a small town near Charleston" is struck by the number of children in that village and thinks to ask the waiter at his hotel about it. The obliging server takes the traveler to see the train tracks at the east end of town where the expresses to Miami come barreling through. "It's this way," he explained. "That damned train rushes by here every morning at seven o'clock. It's too early to get out of bed, and too late to go back to sleep.""
- In 1946, Frank Cunningham wrote the book Big Dan: The Story Of A Colorful Railroader about the railroader Daniel Goode Cunningham or Big Dan. In the book the Baby Train myth is mentioned.
- In 1956, Baby Train popped up in Playboy's "Party Jokes".
- In 1967, Reader's Digest mentioned a version of the myth without a train: "A harried young serviceman, tripping over small children, babies in buggies and the assorted paraphernalia of the very young in a shopping area of San Francisco, sputtered exasperatedly, "Good Lord! Don't these people around here ever do anything else?" A passerby commented knowingly, "It's the foghorns.""
- In 1985, Bill Scott, an Australian folklorist published The Long & The Short & The Tall: a collection of Australian yarns, where the Baby Train is written down.
- In 1993, folklorist Jan Harold Brunvand published the book The Baby Train & Other Lusty Urban Legends. The Baby Train was Brunvand's fifth in a series of books that set out to document, and occasionally debunk, urban legends such as "Cactus and Spiders," "The Slasher Under the Car," and "Car Theft during Earth Quake," along with the "Baby Train." Many of the stories were collected from readers of Brunvand's syndicated newspaper column, "Urban Legend". Like Brunvand's previous urban legend books, stories in The Baby Train & Other Lusty Urban Legends are divided into common themes: automobiles, animals, horror, accidents, sex and scandals, crime, business and professional, government, celebrity rumours, and academic legends.
