= Killer in the backseat =

Urban legend

The killer in the backseat (also known as High Beams) is an urban legend from the United States and United Kingdom. It was first noted by folklorist Carlos Drake in 1968 in texts collected by Indiana University students.

== Legend ==
The legend involves a woman who is driving and being followed by a car or truck. The mysterious pursuer flashes his high beams, tailgates her, and sometimes even rams her vehicle. When she finally makes it home, she realizes that the driver was trying to warn her that there was a man (a murderer, or escaped mental patient) hiding in her back seat. Each time the man sat up to attack her, the driver behind had used his high beams to scare the killer, causing him to duck back down.

In some versions, the woman stops for gas, and the attendant asks her to come inside to sort out a problem with her credit card. Inside the station, he asks if she knows there's a man in her back seat. (An example of this rendition can be seen in the 1998 episode of Millennium, "The Pest House".) In another, she sees a doll on the road in the moors, stops, and then the man gets in the back.

== Origin ==
The story has been identified as circulating at least as early as the late 1960s, and may have gained more widespread recognition after appearing in a letter to advice columnist Ann Landers in 1982. It has been speculated, including by Snopes founder David Mikkelson, that the legend may have been inspired by a vaguely similar case which took place in 1964, in which an escaped murderer hid in the backseat of a car, only to end up shot by the car's owner, a police detective. Other somewhat similar, though not identical, cases have since been noted, including by folklorist Jan Harold Brunvand.

== Interpretations ==
The story is often told with a moral. The attendant is often a lumberjack, a trucker, or a scary-looking man: someone the driver mistrusts without reason. She assumes it is the attendant who wants to do her harm, when in reality it is he who saves her life.

== In popular culture ==
- A version of the story by author Alvin Schwartz appears in the 1981 collection of short horror stories for children Scary Stories to Tell in the Dark.
- The 1998 film Urban Legend begins with this scenario.
- In a 1998 episode of Millennium, "The Pest House", Frank Black chases a doctor from a mental hospital after one of its patients escapes into the back of her car and tries to kill her. When she pulls over at a gas station, the attendant saves her by taking her inside.
- A 2003 episode of the detective series Jonathan Creek, "The Coonskin Cap", begins with a version of this legend, except that instead of a killer inside the car, the pursuing driver is trying to alert the woman that there is a body tied to the back of her car.
- The 2022 episode of American Horror Stories, "Drive", Marci (played by Bella Thorne) is driving home from a night club and a jeep starts flashing its high beams at her. Marci loses the jeep and hides behind a car wash. Her friend Piper tells Marci of the legend. Later, it is revealed the driver of the jeep really did see someone in the backseat, but it was not a killer, it was actually someone Marci kidnapped herself, subverting the legend.

== See also ==
- Balete Drive White Lady
