= The Licked Hand =

Urban legend

The Licked Hand, Also known as The Doggy Lick or People Can Lick Too, is an urban legend. It has several versions, and has been found in print as early as February 1982.

In variations of the story, a young girl or a nearsighted woman is left alone and is scared of a local killer. Her only companion is a pet dog, and she feels reassured during the night when the dog seemingly licks her hand. At some point, she discovers that the dog has either been killed or was never in the house with her. The one who was licking her hand was the killer.

== Plot ==
A very young girl is home alone for the first time with only her dog for company. Listening to the news, she hears of a killer on the loose in her neighborhood. Terrified, she locks all the doors and windows, but she forgets about the basement window and it is left unlocked. She goes to bed, taking her dog to her room with her and letting it sleep under her bed. She wakes in the night to hear a dripping sound coming from the bathroom. The dripping noise frightens her, but she is too scared to get out of bed and find out what it is. To reassure herself, she reaches a hand toward the floor for the dog and is rewarded with a lick to her hand. The next morning, she goes to the bathroom for a drink of water only to find her dead, mutilated dog hanging in the shower, his blood slowly dripping, spreading onto the tiles. On the shower wall, written in the dog's blood, are the words "PEOPLE CAN LICK TOO."
