= Giovanni Bragolin =

Italian painter (1911-1981)

Bruno Amadio
- Born: 9 November 1911; Venice, Italy
- Died: 22 September 1981 (aged 69); Padua, Italy
- Other names: Giovanni Bragolin; Angelo Bragolin; Franchot Seville
- Occupation: Painter
- Notable work: The Crying Boy

Bruno Amadio (9 November 1911 – 22 September 1981), popularly known as Bragolin and also known as Angelo Bragolin, Giovanni Bragolin and Franchot Seville, was the creator of the group of paintings known as Crying Boys. The paintings feature a variety of tearful children looking morosely straight ahead. They are sometimes called "Gypsy boys" although there is nothing specifically linking them to Romani people.

He was an academically trained painter, working in post-war Venice as painter and restorer, producing the Crying Boy pictures for tourists. At least 65 such paintings were made under the name Bragolin, reproductions of which were sold worldwide. He was not always paid royalties for the reproductions. In the 1970s he was found to be alive and well-to-do and still painting in Padua. Claims that he fled to Spain after the war, painting children from a local orphanage which subsequently burned down, appear to be an unconfirmed urban legend.
