= The Crying Boy =

Mass-produced print of painting by Bruno Amadio

The artist's signature G Bragolin is present in the top-right corner.

The Crying Boy is a mass-produced print of a painting by Italian painter Bruno Amarillo, whose pen name was Giovanni Bragolin (1911–1981). It was widely distributed from the 1950s onwards.

There are numerous alternative versions, all portraits of tearful young boys or girls. In addition to being widely known, certain urban legends attribute a 'curse' to the painting.

== Curse ==
On 5 September 1985, the British tabloid newspaper The Sun reported that an Essex firefighter claimed that undamaged copies of the painting were frequently found amidst the ruins of burned houses. By the end of November, belief in the painting's curse was widespread enough that The Sun was organising mass bonfires of the paintings, sent in by readers.

Steve Punt, a British writer and comedian, investigated the curse in an episode of the BBC Radio 4 production called Punt PI, first aired on 9 October 2010. The conclusion reached by the programme, following testing at the Building Research Establishment, is that the prints were treated with a varnish containing fire retardant, and that the string holding the painting to the wall would be the first part to deteriorate, resulting in the painting landing face down on the floor and being undamaged by the fire.

David Clarke, investigative journalist, says that stories naming the child as Don Bonillo or Diablo did not emerge until 2000 in a book by Tom Slemen. They relate the child to several fires including the painter's studio. However, he says that "there is absolutely no truth whatsoever to any of that."

== See also ==
- The Hands Resist Him, also known as The eBay Haunted Painting
