= The Hands Resist Him =

Painting by Bill Stoneham

- Also known as the "eBay Haunted Painting"
- Artist: Bill Stoneham
- Year: 1972
- Medium: Oil on stretched canvas
- Dimensions: 61 cm × 91 cm (24 in × 36 in)

The Hands Resist Him is a painting created by artist Bill Stoneham in 1972. It depicts a young boy and a female doll standing in front of a glass paneled door, against which many hands are pressed. According to Stoneham, the boy is based on a photograph of himself at age five. The doorway is a representation of the dividing line between the waking world and the world of fantasy and impossibilities, while the doll is a guide that will escort the boy through it. The titular hands represent alternate lives or possibilities.

The painting became the subject of an urban legend and a viral internet meme in February 2000 when it was posted for sale on eBay with a description implying that it was haunted.

== History ==
The painting was first displayed at the Feingarten Gallery in Beverly Hills, California, during the early 1970s. A one-man Stoneham show at the gallery, which included the piece, was reviewed by the art critic at the Los Angeles Times. During the show, the painting was purchased by actor John Marley.

The painting appeared on the auction website eBay in February 2000. According to the seller, the painting carried some form of curse. Their eBay description made a series of claims that the painting was cursed or haunted. Included in those claims were that the characters in the painting moved during the night, and that they would sometimes leave the painting and enter the room in which it was being displayed. Also included with the listing were a series of photographs that were said to be evidence of an incident in which the female doll character threatened the male character with a gun that she was holding, causing him to attempt to leave the painting. A disclaimer was included with the listing absolving the seller from all liability if the painting was purchased.

News of the listing was quickly spread by internet users who forwarded the link to their friends or wrote their own pages about it. Some people claimed that simply viewing the photos of the painting made them feel ill or have unpleasant experiences. Eventually, the auction page was viewed over 30,000 times.

After an initial bid of $199, the painting eventually received 30 bids and sold for $1,025.00. The buyer, Perception Gallery in Grand Rapids, Michigan, eventually contacted Bill Stoneham and relayed the unusual story of its auction on eBay and their acquisition of it. He reported being quite surprised by all the stories and strange interpretations of the images in the painting. According to the artist, the object presumed by the eBay sellers to be a gun is actually nothing more than a dry cell battery and a tangle of wires.

Stoneham recalls that both the owner of the gallery in which the painting was first displayed, and the art critic who reviewed it, died within one year of coming into contact with the painting.

== New paintings in the series ==
An individual who saw the story about the original painting contacted Stoneham in 2004 about commissioning a sequel. Stoneham accepted and painted Resistance at the Threshold. The sequel depicts the same characters over 40 years later in the same style as the original. A second sequel commission, Threshold of Revelation, was completed in 2012 and can be seen on Stoneham's website. Several years later, a third commission was requested, this time for a prequel. Stoneham created The Hands Invent Him, depicting the artist as a boy who is behind the original painting's door and who holds a paint brush amongst other visual elements. On March 15, 2017, the Haunted Museum in Las Vegas, Nevada, announced it had acquired the prequel painting. All three commissioned paintings can be seen on Stoneham's website page "The Hands Resist Him".

In 2021, Stoneham created what he says is the final painting of the series. What Remains depicts the original painting's setting as deteriorated and scattered with the detritus of earlier lives and stories.

== See also ==
- List of reportedly haunted paintings
