= Scary Stories to Tell in the Dark =

Children's horror book trilogy

- First-edition paperback cover of the first volume
- Scary Stories to Tell in the Dark (1981); More Scary Stories to Tell in the Dark (1984); Scary Stories 3: More Tales to Chill Your Bones (1991)
- Author: Alvin Schwartz
- Illustrator: Stephen Gammell (original editions); Brett Helquist (reillustrated editions)
- Country: United States
- Language: English
- Genre: Horror fiction, Children's literature, Folklore
- Publisher: J. B. Lippincott (1981, 1984); HarperCollins (1991)
- Published: 1981–1991
- No. of books: 3

Scary Stories to Tell in the Dark is a trilogy of children's horror short-story collections written by Alvin Schwartz and originally illustrated by Stephen Gammell. The trilogy comprises three volumes: Scary Stories to Tell in the Dark (1981), More Scary Stories to Tell in the Dark (1984), and Scary Stories 3: More Tales to Chill Your Bones (1991). In 2011, HarperCollins published editions featuring new art by Brett Helquist, causing mass controversy among fans of Gammell. Subsequent printings have restored the original Gammell art.

The three books each feature numerous short stories in the horror genre. Author Schwartz drew heavily from folklore and urban legends as the topic of his stories, researching extensively and spending more than a year on writing each book. Acknowledged influences include William Shakespeare, T. S. Eliot, Mark Twain, Joel Chandler Harris, Bennett Cerf and Jan Harold Brunvand. The first volume was published in 1981, and the books have subsequently been collected in both a box set and a single volume.

Caedmon issued George S. Irving's recording of the first book on vinyl LP in 1986, with music composed by Steven Blane and Richard DeRosa. The LP contains 18 selections and omits some stories from the book, including "The Wendigo". HarperChildren's Audio also issued the recording on cassette and labeled it "unabridged with music".

As of 2017, the books had collectively sold more than seven million copies, and appeared on numerous children's best-seller lists. They have collectively been hailed as a "cultural touchstone for a generation", with the original charcoal and ink artwork by Gammell often singled out for praise.

A film adaptation of the same name was released on August 9, 2019 to generally favorable reviews from critics.

== Books ==
#	Title	First publication	Pages	ISBN
1	Scary Stories to Tell in the Dark	1981	viii, 111	0-397-31926-6
The first book contains 29 stories that Schwartz collected from folklore books, collections, and archives, as well as from interviews with informants. The stories in this book include: jump stories (stories that end with a jump scare); ghost stories, including a retelling of The Suffolk Miracle; folk music, including The Hearse Song; a story involving voodoo death; a witch story; a story of a man who shapeshifts into an alligator; a couple of stories of omens of death; a retelling of Algernon Blackwood's novella The Wendigo; a game called "The Dead Man's Brains"; a bogeyman story; a number of urban legends, including the legends of the hook, the poison dress, the killer in the backseat, and the babysitter and the man upstairs; and a selection of jokes and humorous folktales
2	More Scary Stories to Tell in the Dark	1984	xii, 100	0-397-32081-7
The second book contains 28 stories, including: ghost stories, including a vanishing hitchhiker story; a retelling of the Legend of the Mistletoe Bough; a story of premature burial; a cautionary tale involving a girl playing a drum. A retelling of The New Mother; a retelling of the legend of Croglin Grange; a legend of a cannibalistic butcher; a witch story; a number of jump stories, including a story of a curse brought onto a fraternity by a hazing ritual; several urban legends, including the legends of the murdered roommate, the dead man in the rapid transit system, and the dangerous medical student prank; a game in which the players attempt to evoke a ghost to appear in a mirror; the ghost that appears in the mirror is said to be Bloody Mary, La Llorona, or another ghost from folklore; a legend involving three men in a nursing home; a variant of the folk song "The Irish Washerwoman"; and a number of jokes and humorous stories, including a humorous story involving a poltergeist
3	Scary Stories 3: More Tales to Chill Your Bones	1991	115	0-06-021794-4
The third and final book contains 25 stories, including: a story of a man who tries to escape from Death; ghost stories, including a vanishing hitchhiker story, as well as a story of a black dog; a retelling of the legend of the death of Oleg the Prophet; a story of an adult-sized doll that comes to life. Inspired by the Swiss Alps tale of the Sennentuntschi; a story from the Lincolnshire Marsh, which was alleged to be inhabited by evil spirits; a witch story; a story of a feral child; a story of a dream that foretells the future. A retelling of a ghost story from Augustus Hare; several urban legends, including the legends of the spider bite, the Mexican pet, and the vanishing hotel room.; a story of a poltergeist/psychokinesis; a selection of jokes and humorous stories; and concludes the series with a variant of the Hearse Song
Compilation	The Scary Stories Treasury	July 25, 2004	368	978-0-760-76273-8
A compilation of all three books.
Compilation	Scary Stories: The Complete 3-Book Collection	July 25, 2017	368	978-0062682895
A box set of all three books with the original illustrations from Stephen Gammell.

== Editions ==
To celebrate the books' 30th anniversary in 2011, HarperCollins re-released the books with new illustrations from Brett Helquist. The new illustrations were generally regarded as kid-friendly and not as disturbing as their previous illustrations, resulting in widespread criticism from fans of the original. In 2017, the books were re-issued with the original artwork. In 2019, HarperCollins published movie tie-in editions with covers featuring images from the film and Gammell's original illustrations inside.

== Reception ==
=== Reviews ===
Jon Scieszka of Entertainment Weekly called the third book, Scary Stories 3, a "wonderful collection of tales that range from creepy to silly to haunting." He added that Gammell's illustrations added "just the right touch of supernatural spookiness."

=== Controversy ===
This series is listed by the American Library Association as being the most challenged series of books from the 1990s, and seventh most challenged from the 2000s. It again made the list in 2012. Complaints have typically centered on its violence, disturbing subject matter, and potential unsuitability for younger readers, as well as religious concerns. Critics have called the stories, many of which feature macabre topics such as murder, disfigurement and cannibalism, "sick ... repulsive", and "really disgusting ... not appropriate for children". The nightmarish artwork by Stephen Gammell has also been a subject of criticism. Among the groups who have attempted to have the book removed from school libraries are local parent groups and Concerned Women for America; defenders have included the American Library Association and The Bulletin of the Center for Children's Books.

Defenders of the books have claimed that they are aimed at "middle-school kids, who are perfectly able to cope with this kind of thing", and that the stories "help children deal with reality by putting faces on what they're afraid of".

=== Documentary ===
In 2018, a documentary about the book series titled Scary Stories was released. It explores the process of the books' creation (including the artwork and the folkloric inspiration of the stories), their legacy, and the controversy surrounding attempts to ban them. It featured interviews of family members of the late Alvin Schwartz, as well as R. L. Stine and several other authors of 1980s and 1990s children's horror. It debuted at the Panic Fest in Kansas City.

=== Tribute anthology ===
The Horror Writers Association compiled a new tribute anthology titled Don't Turn Out the Lights, edited by Jonathan Maberry, and featuring submissions from HWA members. It was released on September 1, 2020.

== Film adaptation ==
The short animated film Just Delicious, based on the story of the same name in the More Tales to Chill Your Bones collection, directed and animated by Brian Bear, was released on YouTube on May 29, 2009.

In 2013, CBS Films acquired the rights to the Scary Stories to Tell in the Dark books from 1212 Entertainment who initially optioned the material. The script, initially written by John August, was ultimately credited to Dan and Kevin Hageman, with Guillermo del Toro, Marcus Dunstan, and Patrick Melton receiving a "story by" credit.

Del Toro produced the film along with Sean Daniel, Jason Brown, and Elizabeth Grave, with Roberto Grande and Joshua Long executive producing. Michael Garza, Austin Abrams, Gabriel Rush, Austin Zajur and Natalie Ganzhorn were cast, with André Øvredal directing.

The film was released on August 9, 2019, by Lionsgate and CBS Films.

== See also ==
- In a Dark, Dark Room and Other Scary Stories
- Scary Stories for Sleep-overs
- Short & Shivery
- Tales for the Midnight Hour
