= Dirk Zimmer =

German-born artist, illustrator of American children's books

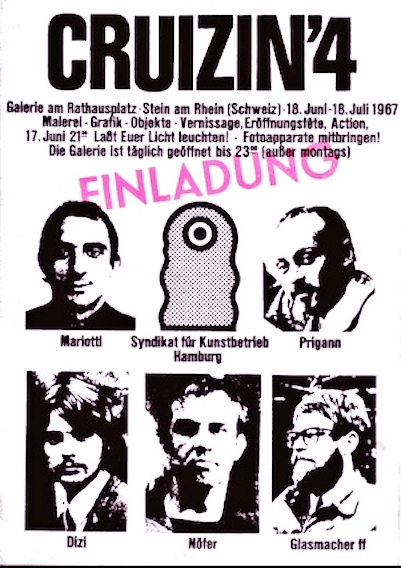
- Second row, far left side: Dirk Zimmer (Dizi), the artist as a young man; exhibition poster by Werner Nöfer, 1967
- Born: 2 October 1943; Goslar, Germany
- Died: 26 September 2008 (aged 64); Poughkeepsie, New York, USA
- Education: University of Fine Arts of Hamburg
- Occupations: Children's book author and illustrator

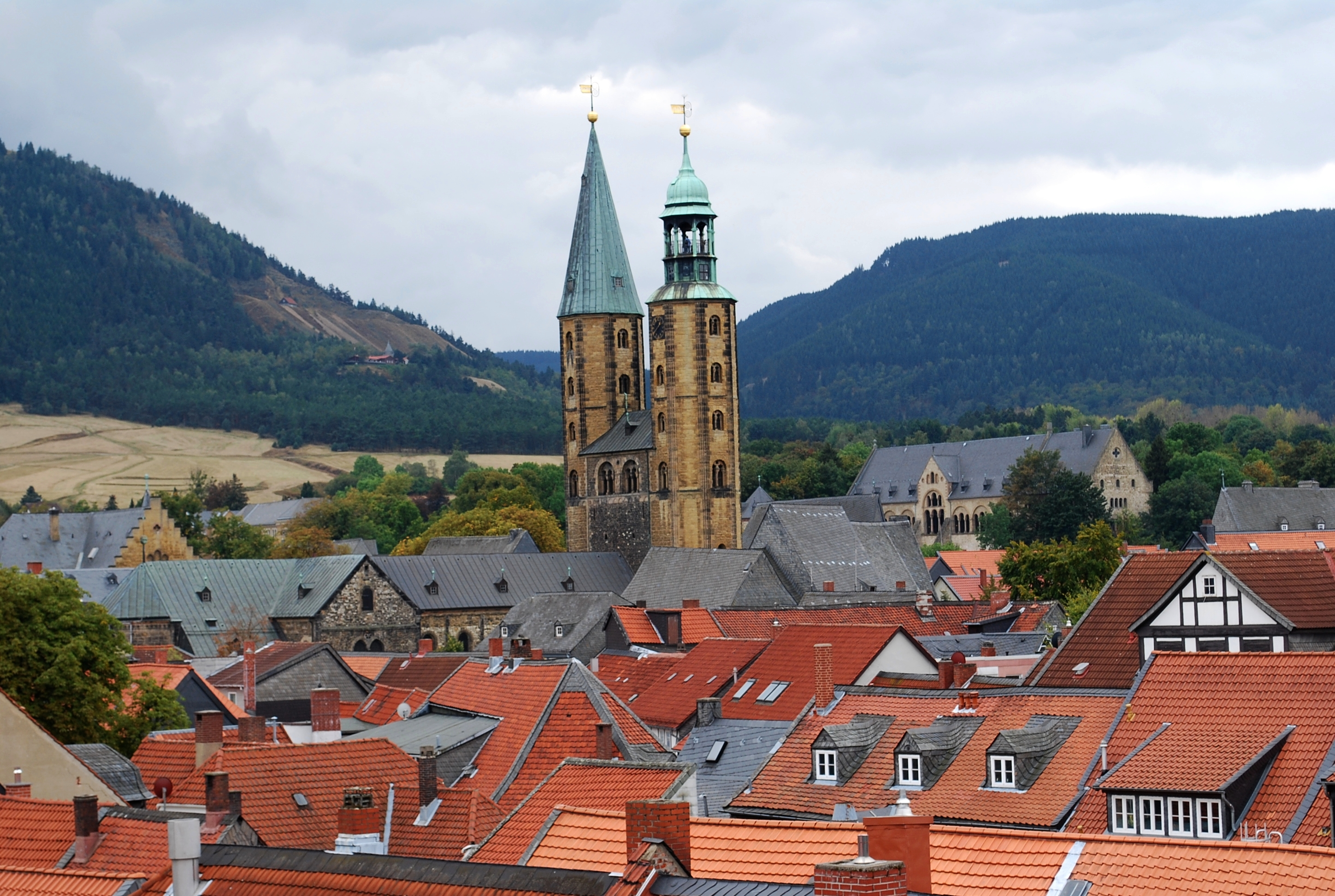
Goslar, near Harz Mountains, Zimmer's birthplace

Dirk "Dizi" Zimmer (2 October 1943 – 26 September 2008) was a German artist and an illustrator and writer of American children's books.

== Biography ==
Zimmer was born in Goslar in Lower Saxony. He grew up mostly in Hamburg, where he attended the University of Fine Arts of Hamburg from 1963 to 1968.

=== The German period ===
In 1965, he, with fellow artists Francesco Mariotti, Herman Prigann, Werner Nöfer, and Dieter Glasmacher, co-founded Cruizin 4, an art organisation best known for two events: the opening of the exhibition Cruizin 4 in the Gallery Mensch at Fischmarkt Hamburg-Altona and a performance at Cosinus, a pub in the university district. The Happening 1. World Record in Permanent Painting took place under medical, and specifically psychiatric care, by doctors of the University Hospital Eppendorf. (The planned 80-hour performance was cancelled after 36 hours on medical advice because of collapse of one of the participants).

Under the moniker 'Dizi', Zimmer had a brief career as a painter during the German avant-garde movement and then turned to film-making, which he eventually dropped in the late 1970s to work as an illustrator for American publications including Crawdaddy, The New York Times, and The New-York Magazine. Over the years, both his paintings and illustrations were shown in private galleries in New York, Germany, Switzerland, and France.

=== The American period ===
His work as a children's book illustrator began after moving permanently to New York City in 1977. He also continued to exhibit his artwork and to be a presence in the New York art scene. He lived in a flat in John Street for a lengthy period of time. The only media contact with his homeland was through the German Boa Vista magazine, in which he first published vignettes, then later his written and illustrated (from 1977, New York) short-story comic with the cryptically and untranslatable German title Die mysteriöse Schratzmichlöse. From 1978 to 2004 Zimmer published more than thirty children's books.

Zimmer moved to Barrytown, NY in the early 1980s, and later lived in the Rondout area of Kingston. He was a contributor and collaborator at the northern Dutchess quarterly AboutTown. He later moved to Tivoli, NY. In 1990, he was one of a small group of illustrators—including Natalie Babbitt, Maurice Sendak, Marc Simont and Barbara Cooney—whose work was featured in The Big Book for Peace (Dutton, 1990), an anthology of 34 artists and writers.

=== Car accident and death ===
In Tivoli, on a walk to the river on the afternoon of September 21, 2008, Zimmer was struck by a car. He died from his injuries on September 26 at St. Francis Hospital in Poughkeepsie, N.Y. He is survived by two sisters who live in Germany. The sequel of the book Egon (1980), on which he was working at that time, was left unfinished. Egon, Zimmer's adventurous, furry alter ego, leaves the following note at the end of the book: "I am having a good time. I will be home some day but not until the show ends. Maybe soon."

== Legacy ==
Zimmer's offbeat, sometimes grotesque, but always gentle humour made him much sought-after as an illustrator for "scary" picture books, two of which were included in the American Library Association Notable Book lists for children's books.

The Trick-Or-Treat Trap - the only book that he wrote and illustrated himself - was critically well received. The New York Times praised its "tongue-in-cheek" humour: "His pen has bite as he pictures a wonderfully wicked assortment of ornery little beings."

== Bibliography ==
=== Books in cooperation ===
==== In German ====
- 1982 Egon by Larry Bograd. Reinbek bei Hbg., Carlsen Verlag (Reinbeker Kinderbücher), Reinbek bei Hamburg.

==== In English ====
- 1968 The Iron Giant: A Story in Five Nights by Ted Hughes
- 1978 Felix in the Attic by Larry Bograd
- 1980 Egon by Larry Bograd
- 1981 Mean Jake and the Devils by William H. Hooks
- 1983 Bony-Legs by Joanna Cole; Esteban and the Ghost by Sibyl Hancock
- 1984 In a Dark, Dark Room and Other Scary Stories by Alvin Schwartz
- 1985 Buster Loves Buttons by Fran Manushkin; Someone Saw a Spider: Spider Facts and Folktales by Shirley Climo
- 1986 Poor Gertie by Larry Bograd; Perrywinkle and the Book of Magic Spells by Ross Madsen
- 1987 Curse Squirrel Bk/Cass by Laurence Yep; The Naked Bear: Folktales of the Iroquois by John Bierhorst; Sky is Full of Song by Lee Bennett Hopkins
- 1989 Weird Wolf by Margery Cuyler; Windy Day: Stories and Poems by Caroline Feller; John Tabor's Ride by Edward C. Day
- 1990 The Big Book for Peace by Lloyd Alexander
- 1991 The Cow Is Mooing Anyhow: A Scrambled Alphabet to Be Read at Breakfast by Laura Geringer
- 1992 Moonbow of Mr. B. Bones by J. Patrick Lewis; The One That Got Away by Percival Everett
- 1993 Tsugele’s Broom by Valerie Scho Carey
- 1994 Seven Spiders Spinning (The Hamlet Chronicles # 1) by Gregory Maguire The curse of the calico cat by Ellen Weiss
- 1995 Some Fine Grumpa! by Alan Arkin
- 1996 One Eye, Two Eyes, Three Eyes: A Hutzul Tale; The Great Turtle Drive by Steve Sanfield
- 1997 Perrywinkle's Magic Match by Ross Martin Madsen
- 2004 An I Can Read Halloween Treat by Michele Sobel Spirn
- 2006 Jake the Gardener: Guide Dog Digs Treasure by E. S. Aardvark

=== Books by himself ===
- 1982 The Trick-Or-Treat Trap, Harper & Row

== Awards, honours ==
- 1978 Irma Simonton Schwarz Award from the Bank Street College of Education for Felix in the Attic, Harvey House
