= Short & Shivery =

Horror short stories for children

- Author: Robert D. San Souci
- Illustrator: Katherine Coville; Jacqueline Rogers
- Country: United States
- Language: English
- Genre: Horror, children's
- Publisher: Yearling Books
- Published: 1987-1998

Short & Shivery, also known as Short & Shivery: Thirty Chilling Tales, is a series of scary short-story children's books, published between 1987 and 1998 and written by author Robert D. San Souci. The anthology series spawned several sequels throughout an 11-year span. Each book contained 30 tales from America and around the world, including classics by various famous authors throughout history.

== Overview ==
Selected from international ghost folklore, each volume contains 30 stories, specifically retold by author Robert D. San Souci for younger readers. Each book contains a mixture of classic and contemporary tales, including several American classics, all accompanied by illustrations by Katherine Coville and Jacqueline Rogers. It includes stories by the Brothers Grimm, Nathaniel Hawthorne, Washington Irving and Charles Dickens.

The series produced several sequels and were later collected into a compilation book, Giant Short & Shivery. Audiobook versions of the first three volumes have since been released on cassette and compact disc, narrated by Mark Hammer.

School Library Journal called the series "an absolute delight ... Young readers will gobble up these thirty thrilling snacks and beg for more".

== Books ==
| # | Title | Author | Original published date | Pages | ISBN |
|---|---|---|---|---|---|
| 1 | Short & Shivery: Thirty Chilling Tales | Robert D. San Souci | September 2, 1987 | 192 | 0-440-41804-6 |
Contents: The Robber Bridegroom (adapted from the Brothers Grimm); Jack Frost (from a Russian folktale); The Waterfall of Ghosts (from the Japanese writings of Lafcadio Hearn); The Ghost's Cap (from a Russian folktale); The Witch Cat (folklore of the United States - Virginia); The Green Mist (a legend from Lincolnshire, England); The Cegua (a folktale from Costa Rica); The Ghostly Little Girl (United States - California); The Midnight Mass of the Dead (a Norse folktale); Tailypo (United States - West Virginia); Lady Eleanore's Mantle (from a tale by Nathaniel Hawthorne); The Soldier and the Vampire (a Russian folktale); The Skeleton's Dance (a folktale from Japan); Scared To Death (United States - South Carolina); Swallowed Alive (a British folktale); The Deacon's Ghost (a folktale from Iceland); Nuckelavee (a folktale from Orkney Islands); The Adventure of the German Student (from a tale by Washington Irving); Billy Mosby's Night Ride (United States - New England); The Hunter in the Haunted Forest (a Native American Legend); Brother and Sister (retold from an African folktale); The Lovers of Dismal Swamp (United States - Virginia); Boneless (based on folklore of the Shetland Islands); The Death Waltz (United States - New Mexico); The Ghost of Misery Hill (United States - California); The Loup-Garou (from French-Canadian folklore); The Golem (based on Jewish folklore); Lavender (United States); The Goblin Spider (a Japanese legend); The Halloween Pony (from a French folktale).
| 2 | More Short & Shivery: Thirty Terrifying Tales | Robert D. San Souci | 1994 | 176 | 0-440-41857-7 |
Contents: "Hold Him Tabb!" (United States - Virginia); The Witches' Eyes (Spanish American - American Southwest); The Duppy (Haiti); Two Snakes (China); The Draug (Norway); The Vampire Cat (Japan); Windigo Island (Canada); The Haunted Inn (China); The Rolling Head (North America - Plains Indians); The Croglin Grange Vampire (British Isles - England); The Yara (Brazil); "Me, Myself" (British Isles - Scotland); Island of Fear (North America - Seneca Tribe); Three Who Sought Death (British Isles - England - from Geoffrey Chaucer); Sister Death and the Healer (Mexico / American Southwest); The Mouse Tower (Germany); The Devil and Tom Walker (United States - from a tale by Washington Irving); The Greedy Daughter (Italy); The Pirate (United States - adapted from a poem by Richard H. Dana); The Golden Arm (British Isles - England); The Serpent Woman (Spain); Loft the Enchanter (Iceland); The Accursed House (United States - Ohio); Escape up the Tree (Nigeria); The Headrest (Papua New Guinea); The Thing in the Woods (United States - Louisiana); King of the Cats (British Isles - England); The Dead Mother (Russia); Knock… Knock… Knock... (United States / Canada - urban folklore); Twice Surprised (Japan).
| 3 | Even More Short & Shivery: Forty-five Spine-Tingling Tales | Robert D. San Souci | December 1, 1997 | 176 | 0-439-04233-X |
Contents: "The Mouse Tower" (Germany); "The Devil and Tom Walker" (United States - from a tale by Washington Irving); The Greedy Daughter" (Italy); "The Pirate" (United States - adapted from a poem by Richard H. Dana); "The Golden Arm" (British Isles - England); "The Serpent Woman" (Spain); "Loft the Enchanter" (Iceland); "The Accursed House" (United States - Ohio); "Escape Up the Tree" (Nigeria); "The Headrest" (Papua New Guinea); "The Thing in the Woods" (United States - Louisiana); "King of the Cats" (British Isles - England); "The Dead Mother" (Russia); "Knock...Knock...Knock..." (United States/Canada - urban folklore); "Twice Surprised" (Japan); "Appointment in Samarra" (Persia); "Deer Woman" (United States - Ponca tribe); "The Maggot" (British Isles - England); "Witch Woman" (United States - African American traditional); "The Berbalangs" (Philippines); "The Dancing Dead of Shark Island" (British Isles - Ireland); "That I See, but This I Sew" (British Isles - Scotland); "La Guiablesse" (West Indies - Martinique); "The Blood-Drawing Ghost" (British Isles - Ireland); "Guests from Gibbet Island" (United States - from Washington Irving); "The Haunted House" (China); "Never Far from You" (British Isles - England); "The Rose Elf" (Denmark - from Hans Christian Andersen); "The Wind Rider" (Poland); "The Skull That Spoke" (Nigeria); "The Monster of Baylock" (British Isles - Ireland); "The New Mother" (British Isles - England); "Rokuro-Kubi" (Japan); "Dicey and Orpus" (United States - African American traditional); "Chips" (British Isles - from Charles Dickens); "The Skeleton's Revenge" (Mexico); "Lullaby" (British Isles - England); "Death and the Two Friends" (United States - South Carolina); "Forest Ghosts" (France); "The Carolina Banshee" (United States - North Carolina); "The Deadly Violin" (Germany - Jewish traditional); "A Night of Terrors" (United States - urban folklore); "The Sending" (Iceland); "The Hand of Fate" (British Isles - Wales); "Old Raw Head" (United States - the South)
| 4 | A Terrifying Taste of Short & Shivery: Thirty Creepy Tales | Robert D. San Souci | September 8, 1998 | 176 | 0-440-41878-X |
Contents: Crocker Waits (British Isles - England); Yara-ma-yha-who (Australia); The Fata (Italy); The Fiddler (British Isles - Wales); Land-Otter (Native American - Tlingit tribe); A Fish Story (United States - Virginia - African American traditional); Apparitions (Germany); The Bijli (India); The Lutin (Canada - French Canadian traditional); The Hundredth Skull (United States - Ohio); The Ogre's Arm (Japan); The Hairy Hands (British Isles - England); The Snow Husband (Native American - Algonquin tribe); The Zimwi (Africa - from the Swahili); Witchbirds (France); Dangerous Hill (British Isles - England); The Witch's Head (El Salvador); Dinkins Is Dead (United States - South Carolina); Old Nan's Ghost (British Isles - England); The Interrupted Wedding (Norway); The Mulombe (Africa - Zimbabwe); The Haunted Grove (Canada); The Tiger Woman (China); Peacock's Ghost (United States - Louisiana); Israel and the Werewolf (Poland - Jewish traditional); Hoichi the Earless (Japan - from Lafcadio Hearn); A Snap of the Fingers (Mexico); Narrow Escape (United States - California); The Black Fox (United States - Connecticut); The Mother and Death (Denmark - from Hans Christian Andersen).
| S | Giant Short & Shivery | Robert D. San Souci | 1998 | 163 | 0-760-71145-3 |
A compilation of previous short scary stories from the Short & Shivery series.

== See also ==
- Robert D. San Souci
- Dare to Be Scared
- Yearling Books
- Scary Stories to Tell in the Dark
- Scary Stories for Sleep-overs
- Tales for the Midnight Hour
