= Croglin Grange =

Vampire legend

The Vampire of Croglin Grange is a vampire legend that took place in Cumberland, England. The story first appeared in Story of My Life by Augustus Hare, written in the 1890s. In 1929, Montague Summers republished the story along with the first chapter of Varney the Vampire. He pointed out that the two stories were very similar and should be dismissed as folklore.

Charles G. Harper challenged the Hare book in 1924 after visiting the area. He found no evidence that Croglin Grange ever even existed, but did however find two similar buildings called Croglin High Hall and Croglin Low Hall. Neither fitted the description of the place in the book. Eventually, after much research, he came to the conclusion that Croglin Low Hall was the place Hare had referred to in the book, even though a chapel had not existed nearby for many years.

== Summary ==
In the tale written by Augustus Hare, several episodes took place between 1875 and 1876. An old house had been rented out to a woman and two brothers, Amelia, Edward, and Michael Cranswell. During one summer, Amelia was trying to sleep when a strange creature appeared at her window and began picking out the lead surrounding one of the window panes with a long fingernail, then removing it and putting its hand through the resulting gap to undo the window latch and let itself in. It was described as having a brown face and flaming eyes. The vampire bit her in the throat. When her brothers came into the room, the monster was gone. While one brother tried to help his sister, the other went after the creature.

After a trip to Switzerland, the three returned to Croglin Grange and the creature returned again. The brother shot it in the leg and was able to track it down to a vault in the local cemetery. They waited until the next day to enter the vault, where they found the body of the vampire, with a fresh wound to the leg, resting inside a coffin. They then burned it.

A version of the story appears under the title "The Window" in Alvin Schwartz and Stephen Gammell's More Scary Stories to Tell in the Dark (1984).

== See also ==
- List of vampires in folklore and mythology
