= Coraline =

2002 children's novella by Neil Gaiman

- Front cover by Dave McKean
- Author: Neil Gaiman
- Illustrator: Dave McKean
- Cover artist: Dave McKean
- Language: English
- Genre: Dark fantasy
- Publisher: Bloomsbury Publishing (UK); HarperCollins (US)
- Publication date: 2 July 2002
- Publication place: United Kingdom
- Media type: Print, e-book, audiobook
- Pages: 210
- ISBN: 0-06-113937-8
- OCLC: 71822484
- Dewey Decimal: 813
- LC Class: PZ7.G1273 Co 2002

Coraline (/ˈkɒrəlaɪn/) is a 2002 British fantasy horror children's novella by author Neil Gaiman. Gaiman started writing Coraline in 1990, and it was published in 2002 by Bloomsbury and HarperCollins. It was awarded the 2003 Hugo Award for Best Novella, the 2003 Nebula Award for Best Novella, and the 2002 Bram Stoker Award for Best Work for Young Readers. The Guardian ranked Coraline #82 in its list of 100 Best Books of the 21st Century. It was adapted as a 2009 stop-motion animated film, directed by Henry Selick under the same name.

== Plot ==
A young girl named Coraline Jones and her parents move into an old house that has been divided into flats. The other tenants include former actresses, April Spink and Miriam Forcible, and Mr. Bobo (commonly referred as the "Crazy Old Man Upstairs"), who claims to be training a mouse circus. The flat beside Coraline's, which lies behind a big brown door, remains empty.

During a rainy day, she discovers the locked door in the living room, which has been blocked by bricks. As she goes to visit her neighbors the next day, Mr. Bobo relays her a message from the mice warning her against going through the door. Spink and Forcible read Coraline's fortune on tea leaves and agree that she is in danger before giving her a lucky adder stone that is "good for bad things". Despite these warnings, Coraline decides to unlock the door when she is home by herself the day after, finding the brick wall behind the door gone. In its place is a long passageway, which leads to a flat identical to her own, inhabited by her Other Mother and Other Father, button-eyed and exaggerated doppelgängers of her parents. In this "Other World", Coraline finds everything to be better than her own – the Other Parents are attentive, her toy box is filled with sentient toys, the world's counterpart of Mr. Bobo trains rats, and the world's counterparts of Spink and Forcible perform a cabaret show in their flat. She even finds the feral black cat that wanders around the house in the real world can talk; however, she learns he is not of the Other World; he only travels from one world. He warns Coraline of the imminent danger, but Coraline pays him no heed.

The Other Mother offers Coraline a chance to stay in the Other World forever, if Coraline will allow buttons to be sewn over her eyes. Coraline is horrified and returns through the door to go home. Upon her return to her flat, Coraline finds her real parents are missing, eventually discovering that the Other Mother has kidnapped them. Though frightened of returning, Coraline goes back to the Other World to confront the Other Mother and rescue her parents. As she ponders this situation in the front yard, the Cat advises Coraline to challenge the Other Mother, as "her kind of thing loves games and challenges". The Other Mother tries to convince Coraline to stay, but she refuses and is detained behind a mirror as a punishment.

In the darkness, she meets a trio of ghost children, each from a different era, who had allowed the Other Mother, truthfully an evil being known as "The Beldam", to lure them into her world and sew buttons over their eyes. The ghost children recount how she eventually stopped loving them and cast their spirits aside. They implore Coraline to avoid their fate and to help find the essences of their souls so that they can finally escape the Other World and move on to the afterlife. After the Beldam releases Coraline from the mirror, Coraline proposes a game in which she must find the essences of the ghost children's souls and her parents, which are hidden throughout the Other World. If Coraline wins, she, her parents and the ghost children may go free; if not, Coraline will stay and finally accept the Beldam's offer of having buttons sewn over her eyes.

Coraline goes through the Other World and overcomes all the Beldam's obstacles, using her wits and the adder stone to locate the souls' essences. At the close of the game, the ghost children warn her that even if Coraline wins, the Beldam will not let them go. Having deduced her parents are imprisoned in a snow globe nearby, Coraline tricks the Beldam by saying her parents are behind the door in the drawing room. As the sorceress opens the door, Coraline throws the cat at her, grabs the snow globe, and she and the cat escape to the real world with the key. In doing so, she forces the door shut on one of the Beldam's hands, amputating it. Back in her home, Coraline finds her parents safe and have mysteriously forgotten about their capture.

That night, Coraline has a dream in which she meets the ghost children before they are allowed to finally rest in peace. They warn her that her task is still not done as the Beldam's amputated hand is in the real world, attempting to steal the key needed to unlock the door that connects the two worlds. Coraline goes to an old and bottomless well in the woods by her house, luring the hand there with the key and casting both down the well. Coraline returns home, victorious, and prepares to go about the ordinary life she has come to accept and love.

== Characters ==
- Coraline Jones is the titular main protagonist of the novel. She is a curious, intelligent, resourceful and courageous girl. Coraline is often irritated by rain, her "crazy" grown-up neighbours and not being taken seriously because of her young age. She is described as being "small for her age".
- Mel Jones is Coraline's mother. She is very busy most of the time and sometimes inattentive, but she loves and cares about her daughter.
- Charlie Jones is Coraline's father. He cares about his daughter very much and is kind, brave and helpful. He makes "creative" food creations that Coraline strongly dislikes. He is usually found working at the house on his computer. Like his wife, Mrs. Jones, he is usually too busy to spend time with Coraline.
- The Cat is a black cat from the real world, who acts as a mentor to Coraline and guides her through her journey. He is unnamed, as he explains that cats do not need names to tell each other apart, but the Beldam refers to him as "Vermin". Unlike many of the characters in the novel, he does not have an "Other World" counterpart, as he states that unlike other creatures in the world, cats can "keep themselves together." He moves freely from one world to the other and is capable of talking in the Other World. He has a sarcastic personality, constantly belittling Coraline, but befriends her and helps her escape from the Beldam. He is defiant of the sorceress, but trembles at the thought of being stuck in the Other World forever.
- The Beldam alias The Other Mother is the main antagonist of the novel. She is an evil and inhuman sorceress and the ruler of the Other World. In her first form, she looks similar to Mrs. Jones but taller and thinner, with long black hair that seems to move by itself, black button eyes, paper-white skin and extremely long and twitchy fingers with long and dark red nails. During the course of the novel, she becomes taller, thinner and paler, having little physical similarities to Mrs. Jones by the end, suggesting she has the ability to metamorphose. She cannot create, but only copy, twist and change things from the real world when constructing her version of it. She collects children by luring them into her world and love bombing them before eventually convincing them to let her sew buttons into their eyes, which allows her to then consume their lives and hold their souls as prisoners after their deaths.
- The Other Father is one of the creations of the Beldam, in the image of Mr. Jones. The Other Father is used to help trick Coraline to stay in the Other World. Like her real father, he has a study and sits there during the day and will not talk to Coraline for long. He does not work, he merely occupies the study and is not permitted to talk to Coraline without the Beldam's influence. He appears to be much more enjoyable than Coraline's real father and always tries to be cheerful and fun in front of Coraline. In reality, the Other Father is sad and somewhat nervous. The Beldam ends up punishing him for revealing too much to Coraline by transfiguring him into a soft, doughy and grub-like creature and orders the Other Father to trap Coraline so she cannot win her challenge. He voices his reluctance not to harm her, yet cannot refuse the Beldam's orders.
- April Spink and Miriam Forcible are a pair of retired actresses who live in the flat under Coraline's. They own many aging Scotties and talk in theater jargon, often referencing their glory days as actresses. In the Other World, they are youthful and perform continuously in front of anthropomorphic dogs. Later in the novel, the Other Spink and Forcible appear to be conjoined twins inside a cocoon-like sac where they possess the second soul. As for the dogs, they appear to have become bat-like.
- Mr. Bobo is a retired circus performer living in the flat above Coraline's and is commonly referred to throughout the story as the "Crazy Old Man". Over the course of the book, he claims to be training mice to perform in a mouse circus, and often brings Coraline messages from them. His Other World counterpart trains rats and is practically made of them.
- The Ghost Children are the spirits of three children, a pair of girls and a boy, who were the Beldam's previous victims. The boy is described as having a dirty face and red trousers. One of the girls has blonde hair with a circle of glittering silver, a dress with a pattern of spider webs and a pair of silver butterfly wings coming out of her back (implying that she might be a fairy). The other has a brown bonnet and brown dress. They were trapped by the Beldam at different times before Coraline and reside in the dark space behind the mirror. After having their souls restored, they are allowed to enter the afterlife.

== Allusions ==
Gaiman has acknowledged Lewis Carroll's Alice's Adventures in Wonderland and "The New Mother" by Lucy Clifford as major influences on the novella. In his study of the novella, David Rudd argues that the work plays and riffs productively on Sigmund Freud's concept of Unheimlich ("the Uncanny").

== Adaptations ==
=== Graphic novel ===
A graphic novel adaptation by P. Craig Russell, lettered by Todd Klein and colored by Lovern Kindzierski, was published in 2008.

=== Film ===
With the help of the animation studio Laika, LLC, director Henry Selick released a stop motion film adaptation in 2009 that received much critical acclaim, and moderate box office success. At the 82nd Academy Awards, the film was nominated for Best Animated Feature but lost to Pixar's Up. Although the 2009 film has several differences (one example is the Beldam turning the Other Father into a pumpkin), it still manages to be relatively accurate to the original plot of the book. In the film, Coraline is depicted as having short blue hair and freckles. In the movie, there was an added new character named Wyborn "Wybie" Lovat, a boy (who is only mentioned in the novel as the boy who lived in the house before Coraline) about Coraline's age who frequently annoyed Coraline at first, but over time, they grow on each other. In the Other World, his copy cannot speak but is an ally to Coraline, and gets punished by the Other Mother when he helps Coraline escape the Other World. At the end of the film, Coraline reaches out to help Wybie tell his grandmother what is behind the little door. The sister of Wybie's grandmother was one of the ghost children lost to the Beldam.

=== Theatre ===
==== 2009 musical ====
A theatrical adaptation, with music and lyrics by Stephin Merritt and book by David Greenspan, premiered on 6 May 2009, produced by MCC Theater and True Love Productions Off-Broadway at The Lucille Lortel Theatre. Nine-year-old Coraline was played by an adult, Jayne Houdyshell, and the Other Mother was played by David Greenspan..

==== 2018 opera ====
Another theatrical adaptation, a stage opera by Mark-Anthony Turnage based on the novella, made its world premiere at the Barbican Centre in London on 27 March 2018.

==== Cancelled 2025 musical ====
On 22 May 2024, it was announced that a new musical adaptation, with music and lyrics by Louis Barabbas and book by Zinnie Harris, would premiere at the Leeds Playhouse on 11 April 2025, before embarking on a tour to the HOME (Manchester), the Birmingham Repertory Theatre, and the Royal Lyceum Theatre in Edinburgh. On 29 January 2025, the new adaptation was cancelled, with ongoing allegations against Neil Gaiman being cited as the reason.

It was set to be directed by James Brining, set and costume designed by Colin Richmond, puppet design and direction by Rachael Canning and choreographed by EJ Boyle.

=== Video games ===
A 2009 video game adaptation, based on the film, was published and developed by D3 Publisher of America. The game was released on 27 January 2009 for the PlayStation 2, Nintendo DS and Wii platforms and contains features such as playing as Coraline, interacting with other characters, and playing minigames. The game received mostly negative reviews, and little success.

In November 2024, a Roblox game based on the film, Coraline: Evade the Others, was released on moblie platforms and PC, developed by Toya in honor of the film's 15th anniversity and its re-release, gaining over 18 million visits by January 2025.

=== Parodies ===
Coraline inspired the "Coralisa" segment of The Simpsons episode "Treehouse of Horror XXVIII", which aired on 22 October 2017. Neil Gaiman provided the voice of the Simpsons' cat, Snowball V.

== See also ==
- Coraline (given name)
- Coraline's Curious Cat Trail
