= The New Mother =

Short story by Lucy Clifford

- Short story by Lucy Clifford
- Country: United Kingdom
- Language: English
- Genre: Horror short story

Publication
- Published in: The Anyhow Stories, Moral and Otherwise
- Publisher: Macmillan and Co.
- Media type: Print
- Publication date: 1882

"The New Mother" is a short story by the English writer Lucy Clifford and first published in her collection of children's stories, The Anyhow Stories, Moral and Otherwise in 1882. The story has been reprinted in anthologies, including The Dark Descent, and was rewritten for the Scary Stories to Tell in the Dark series.

The story starts with two sisters who live with their mother at a forest house, while their estranged father is far away. The girls are initially well-behaved, but they are tempted to be naughty by a strange girl. She promises to eventually reward their new behavior by showing them what she hides in her musical instrument. The girls' mother threatens to abandon them, and tells them that she will be replaced by an intimidating new mother. She eventually fulfills her threat. The strange girl never fulfills her promise, but she informs the sisters that their mother will never return. The sisters live in fear of their new mother, and learn to survive on their own by foraging. They are futilely waiting for the return of their actual mother, which will never happen.

The original story has inspired literary adaptations by both Alvin Schwartz and Robert D. San Souci, and a short film adaptation by Brian Lange. It is also credited as a primary inspiration for Neil Gaiman's novella Coraline.

== Summary ==
The story concerns two well-behaved sisters, Blue-Eyes and Turkey, living with their mother and their baby brother, Arthur, in the forest while their father is far away at sea. One day, the sisters meet a strange girl, who tells them that she has a tiny man and woman in a compartment on her peardrum (a musical instrument described as "like a guitar in shape; it had three strings, but only two pegs by which to tune them. The third string was never tuned at all, and thus added to the singular effect produced by the village girl’s music"), and will only show them to naughty children.

The sisters return home, and do their best to be naughty despite their love for their mother. The mother, despondent, tells the girls that if they don't behave she will have to go away with their infant sibling, and be replaced by a "new mother" with "glass eyes and a wooden tail". When the children next meet the girl, she tells them they haven't been nearly naughty enough, and suggests ways for them to be more naughty. This cycle repeats three times, at the end of which the mother takes the infant child and leaves.

Shortly afterward, the strange girl marches past the sisters' house, taunting them that they will never be naughty enough to see the little people and that the sisters' mother has left to be with their father at sea and will never return. The sisters do not believe the girl and clean up the house and await their mother's return.

The new mother shows up but the sisters try not to let her in. Turkey spies through the front window and see that the new mother does indeed have glass eyes and a wooden tail. The new mother threatens to break down the door with her wooden tail, and the sisters flee into the woods where they live on what they can forage. They occasionally revisit the house in search of their real mother, but the house is now under the ownership of the new mother.

== Adaptations and legacy ==
The story was rewritten by Alvin Schwartz as "The Drum" for More Scary Stories to Tell in the Dark in 1984, the second installment of Scary Stories to Tell in the Dark. In Schwartz's version, the sisters (renamed Delores and Sandra) attempt to obtain a drum that contains a dancing mechanical man and woman from a gypsy girl. And at the end, when the mother and baby leave, the sisters go in search of them. But they do not find them and head back home, only to find the new mother waiting for them inside their hut. Schwartz misattributed the original story as an anonymous folktale entitled "The Pear Drum".

In his 1997 collection Even More Short & Shivery, Robert D. San Souci rewrote the tale, retaining the basic structure but revising the ending and several plot details. The girl and her instrument are changed to an old beggar woman with a music box, where the figurines of a boy and girl come out to dance when it is opened. The two sisters (Blue-Eyes and the renamed Red-Skirts) misbehave to receive the box, only for the beggar woman to be revealed as the new mother with glass eyes and wooden tail in disguise. The children are swallowed by the mother's handbag that grows to a large size when she arrives at their house. The story ends sometime later with two brothers approaching the woman, who opens the box to reveal the dancing figurines of two girls, one with blue eyes and one with red skirts.

"The New Mother" was adapted into the 2008 short film "Music Box", where the sisters are lured into misbehaving by a homeless woman to claim her music box. Unlike the original story, the eponymous new mother is not featured and the sisters' mother simply leaves them at the end. The short film was written and directed by Brian Lange and starred Abi McKenzie and Shelby Howe as the sisters, Dana DeLorenzo as the homeless woman, and Danielle Brothers as the girls' mother.

Neil Gaiman has acknowledged "The New Mother" and Lewis Carroll's Alice's Adventures in Wonderland as major influences on his 2002 novella Coraline.

== See also ==
- "The Father-thing"
- Coraline
