= Song and Dance Man =

1988 picture book by Karen Ackerman

- Song and Dance Man
- Author: Karen Ackerman
- Illustrator: Stephen Gammell
- Genre: Children's picture book
- Publisher: Knopf
- Publication date: 1988
- Publication place: United States
- Media type: Print
- Pages: 32
- ISBN: 0-394-89330-1
- OCLC: 15485512
- Dewey Decimal: [E] 19
- LC Class: PZ7.A1824 So 1988

Song and Dance Man is a children's picture book written by Karen Ackerman and illustrated by Stephen Gammell. Published in 1988 by Knopf Books, the book is about a grandfather who tells his grandchildren about his adventures on the stage. Gammell won the 1989 Caldecott Medal for his illustrations, pencil drawings using full colors.

== Synopsis ==
Three children visit their grandfather and have a wonderful time as he reminisces about his performances on stage. He tells stories of when he was a vaudeville song and dance man, when people did not sit in front of the television for hours. He leads the children to the attic, and finds his old bowler hat, gold-tipped cane, and tap shoes. He performs, telling jokes, dancing and singing, making the children laugh.

== Critical reception ==
Song and Dance Man was published to very strong reviews. The New York Times Book Review called it " a charming, lighthearted and entertaining book", The Everyday Magazine described it as "a wonderfully nostalgic picture book", The video version of Song and Dance Man was reviewed positively by the School Library Journal as a very good addition to both school and public library collections.

Awards
Preceded by Owl Moon	Caldecott Medal recipient 1989	Succeeded by Lon Po Po: A Red-Riding Hood Story from China
