= Thomas Haynes Bayly =

English poet, songwriter, dramatist and writer

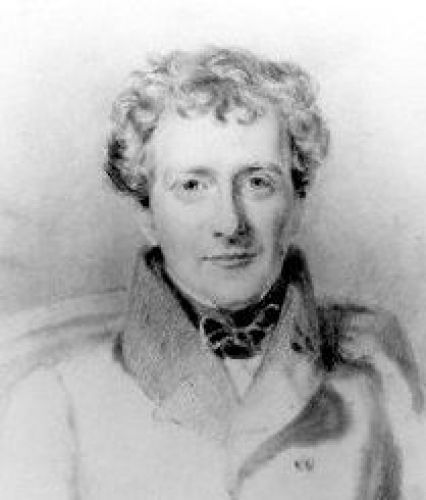
- Born: 13 October 1797; Bath, Somerset, United Kingdom
- Died: 22 April 1839 (aged 41)
- Occupations: poet, songwriter, dramatist

Thomas Haynes Bayly (13 October 1797 – 22 April 1839) was an English poet, songwriter, dramatist and writer.

== Life ==
Bayly was born in Bath on 13 October 1797, the only child of Nathaniel Bayly, an influential citizen of Bath: he was related through his mother to the Earls of Stamford and Warrington and the Baroness le Despencer. He displayed a talent for verse from a young age, and in his eighth year was found dramatising a tale out of one of his story-books. He attended Winchester School, where he produced a weekly newspaper which recorded the proceedings of the master and pupils in the school. At the age of 17 he began working at his father's office for the purpose of studying the law, but soon devoted himself to writing humorous articles for the public journals, and produced a small volume entitled Rough Sketches of Bath. He studied at St Mary Hall, Oxford with the intention of joining the church, but it is reported that "he did not apply himself to the pursuit of academical honours" and left university after three years. Bayly travelled in Scotland, and afterwards visited Dublin, where he distinguished himself in private theatricals and achieved his earliest successes as a ballad writer.

Bayly returned to London in January 1824 and married the daughter of Mr. Benjamin Hayes, of Marble Hill, County Cork in 1826. The profits from his literary works were considerable, and his income was increased by his wife's dowry.

While the young couple were staying in Bitterne, Hampshire, Bayly wrote the song "I'd Be a Butterfly", which became immediately popular. Not long afterwards he produced a three-volume novel, The Aylmers; a second tale, A Legend of Killarney, written during a visit to that part of Ireland; and numerous songs and ballads, which appeared in two volumes, named respectively Loves of the Butterflies and Songs of the Old Château.

After relocating from Bath to London, Bayly dedicated his time to writing ballads and pieces for the stage. The play Perfection, written during a journey by stagecoach from Bath to London and now regarded as his best dramatic work, was declined by many theatrical managers, but ultimately Madame Vestris produced it and appeared in it. Lord Chesterfield, who was present on the first night, declared that he never saw a better farce. The play became a great favourite at private theatricals, and on one occasion it was produced with a cast including the Marchioness of Londonderry and Lord Castlereagh.

By 1831 Bayly and his wife were experiencing financial difficulties. He had invested his wife's dowry in coal mines, which proved unproductive. The agent who managed Mrs. Bayly's property in Ireland failed to provide satisfactory accounts. A replacement agent ultimately made the property pay, but these financial difficulties, combined with poor physical health, had a detrimental effect on Bayly's creativity. During a trip to France to convalesce, he was able to recover sufficiently to write the poem The Bridesmaid, which drew a flattering letter from Sir Robert Peel.

Bayly regained his productivity, and in a short time he wrote thirty-six dramatic pieces. However, By 1837 he had begun to suffer from a range of serious medical conditions. His novel Weeds of Witchery, published that year, led a French critic to describe him as the Anacreon of English romance. In the same year he wrote Kindness in Women, a three-volume collection consisting of a double novel Kate Leslie and an independent tale David Dumps, Or, The Budget of Blunders. They were published by Richard Bentley. He developed dropsy and jaundice, and he died on 22 April 1839. He was buried at Cheltenham, his epitaph being written by his friend Theodore Hook. Bayly played the harmonica, guitar, and banjo.

== Songs ==
Isle of Beauty, Fare Thee Well!

- "Gaily the Troubadour Touched his Guitar"
- "I'd Be a Butterfly"
- "I'll Hang my Harp on a Willow Tree"
- "Isle of Beauty, Fare Thee Well!"
- "The Mistletoe Bough"
- "Oh, No! We Never Mention Her"
- "Oh, Pilot! 'tis a Fearful Night"
- "The Old House at Home"
- "She Wore a Wreath of Roses"
- "We Met, 'twas in a Crowd"
- "Long, Long Ago"

== Bibliography ==
- Thomas Haynes Bayly (1844). Songs and Ballads, Grave and Gay. Carey and Hart.
