= Scary Stories for Sleep-overs =

Series of horror children's books by various authors

- Second volume in the series.
- Author: R.C. Welch; Q.L. Pearce; Don L. Wulffson; Craig Strickland; Allen B. Ury; Mark Kehl
- Illustrator: Ricardo Delgado; Bartt Warbuton; Dwight Been
- Country: United States
- Language: English
- Genre: Terror, children's
- Publisher: Price Stern Sloan
- Published: 1991–1999
- Media type: Print
- Followed by: Scary Mysteries for Sleep-overs

Scary Stories for Sleep-overs is a series of terror children's books written by R.C. Welch, Q.L. Pearce, and various other authors and illustrated by Ricardo Delgado, Bartt Warburton, Dwight Been and others throughout the series. The series was enormously popular, publishing millions of copies and ten initial volumes between the years of 1991 and 1999. The series even produced several one-shot novels and a spin-off series, Scary Mysteries for Sleep-overs. Reaching its peak popularity in the mid-1990s, this was Price Stern Sloan's answer to Scary Stories to Tell in the Dark.

== Overview ==
Reprint of the 1st book in the series, now numbered.

A handful of stories from the first and fourth books in the series have since been released on audiobook in cassette form. The series spawned a compilation book, The Scary Stories for Sleep-overs Almanac, three individual novels, Scary Stories for Sleep-overs: A Novel, and a spin-off series, Scary Mysteries for Sleep-overs. A boxed set was released containing many of the stories from the series. Taking a cue from Scary Stories to Tell in the Dark, this series was also among the most challenged series of books from 1990 to 1999.

== Hallmarks ==
Usually released one a year, one selected author would write 11 anthology-style stories per volume. Each illustrator would create at least one dark illustration per story. The series hit its stride in the mid-1990s when author Q.L. Pearce was selected to write the bulk of the series starting with the second volume. The books were soon reprinted with each book clearly labeled with a number. After the release of the 7th volume the books were shortened to 7 or 8 stories per volume and continued to swap authors each year until the series ended in 1999.

Most stories featured young, troubled protagonists who found themselves facing a paranormal situation or antagonist against their better judgment. Most stories would feature a twist ending, leaving the fate of the main character dead, trapped or uncertain. This device was used most often as a moral tool for readers. Most of the suspense came from dark story-telling, which left room for uncertainty from story to story.

== Scary Stories for Sleep-overs series (1991–1999) ==
#	Title	Author	Original published date	Pages	ISBN
1	Scary Stories for Sleep-overs	R.C. Welch	August 6, 1991	126	978-0-8431-2914-4
Stories include: The Hermit of Collins Peak, Dead Giveaway, The Gift, A Camping Trip, Mummy's Little Helper, Shadow Play, The Dollhouse, Frankenkid, The Girl of Their Dreams, A Wolf in Sheep's Clothing, The Thrill Seekers Club.
2	More Scary Stories for Sleep-overs	Q.L. Pearce	August 30, 1992	138	0-843-13451-8
Stories include: Swimming Lessons, Wish Fulfillment, The Box, Green Thumb, Nightmare, What's the Matter with Marvin?, Crying Wolf, No Laughing Matter, Family Ties, Nine Lives, The Lesson.
3	Still More Scary Stories for Sleep-overs	Q.L. Pearce	June 4, 1993	128	0-843-13588-3
Stories include: Night of the Kii-Kwan, A Special Pair, The Gunslinger, The Slime Mutants of Clear Lake, The Storm, Homecoming, Portrait of Evil, All the Time in the World, Household Help, The Snow Cave, The Fabulous Flyers.
4	Even More Scary Stories for Sleep-overs	Q.L. Pearce	August 25, 1994	127	0-843-13746-0
Stories include: The Tune of Horror, The Shape of Fear, Feast of the Hungry Ghosts, The Invitation, Camp Colby, The Pact, By Any Means, The Power of the Mind, Family Reunion, Nightmare on Sugar Dome, Danger Island.
5	Super Scary Stories for Sleep-overs	Q.L. Pearce	August 24, 1995	128	0-843-13915-3
Stories include: Flesh and blood, The Room at the End of the Hall, It Waits, The Roadside Attraction, The Rocking Horse, Cave Dwellers, A Dead Man's Chest, The Hole in the Ceiling, The Family Honor, A Face in the Crowd, Terror in the Center Ring.
6	More Super Scary Stories for Sleep-overs	Q.L. Pearce	1995	127	978-1-56565-563-8
Stories include: Legend, The Colony, Air Waves, Dead Letter Office, The Wrath of Pele, Faithful Friends, Bungalow 14, The gift, Adrift, The Final Draft, The Exchange.
7	Mega Scary Stories for Sleep-overs	Don L. Wulffson	August 22, 1996	126	0-843-18219-9
Stories include: Corpse of Mr. Porter, Death Sight, Fountain of Terror, Wax Coffins, Electric Girl, Castle of Veins, Brain Pictures, Terror in Room 519, Return from Nowhere, Dead Boy's Clothes, Monster Bait.
8	Scary Stories for Sleep-overs #8	Craig Strickland	August 1, 1997	96	1-565-65714-4
Stories include: Spiderbites, Bloodmobile, Bone Girl, Things from the Jungle, The Black Balloon, Sleep-over at Annette's, Christmas at Mountain Hollow.
9	Scary Stories for Sleep-overs #9	Allen B. Ury	Aug 1, 1998	96	1-565-65895-7
Stories include: Boy Inside, Girl in the Attic, Rules is Rules, Sound Bites, Night Horrors, Faces, Scratcher, Shop Till You Drop.
10	Scary Stories for Sleep-overs #10	Mark Kehl	June 1, 1999	96	0-737-30114-7
The latest in the multimillion-copy-selling Scary Stories for Sleep-Overs series delivers enough fright to scare even the most seasoned horror buff Black-line illustrations make the stories in this collection even more chilling. Stories include: The Crispy Hand, Where the Buffalo Roam, Attack of the Munchies, Rising Horror, The Baby-sitter, Michele's Magical Make-over, Hell on Wheels.
S	The Scary Stories for Sleep-overs Almanac	Michelle Ghaffari	January 1, 1997	79	1-565-65829-9
The title features the true stories of the bizarre and horrifying, terrifying historical figures, peculiar places, frightening folklore, the eerist in entertainment, wretched recipes, outrageous activities, and so much more.

== Scary Stories for Sleep-overs novels (1996) ==
#	Title	Author	Original published date	Pages	ISBN
1	The Living Ghost: Scary Stories for Sleep-overs: A Novel	Allen B. Ury	July 1, 1996	122	1-565-65520-6
When she is accidentally exposed to a beam of radiation while on a school field trip, thirteen-year-old Anne is able to become invisible and to see the malevolent creature that has been plaguing her.
2	Lost in Horror Valley: Scary Stories for Sleep-overs: A Novel	Allen B. Ury	July 15, 1996	121	1-565-65522-2
While on vacation in Utah, fourteen-year-old Bill Nash, his twin sister, and their parents survive the crash of their van only to find themselves in a place full of prehistoric animals and futuristic robots.
3	Scary Stories from 1313 Wicked Way	Craig Strickland	August 1, 1996	124	1-565-65484-6
Connected tales which begin in the late 1700's, detailing how an ancient Victorian Mansion becomes haunted, then brings the reader up to modern times with tales of gargoyles, a Ouija board and a lethal fishpond.

== Scary Mysteries for Sleep-overs series (1996–1997) ==
#	Title	Author	Original published date	Pages	ISBN
1	Scary Mysteries for Sleep-overs	Allen B. Ury	May 7, 1996	126	0-843-18220-2
Stories include: Doppelganger, Deadman's Curve, Public Enemy, Suspended Animation, Foxboro Ghost, Hackers, Nothing to be Afraid of, Scenic Route, Into Thin Air, Joy Ride Revisited.
2	More Scary Mysteries for Sleep-overs	Allen B. Ury	May 7, 1996	128	0-843-18221-0
Stories include: Torture Chamber, Bad Attitude, Money Pit, Bloodlines, People Next Door, Babe, Case of the Very Bad Baby Sitter, Mirror Image, Teddy, Dog Ate My Homework.
3	Still More Scary Mysteries for Sleep-overs	Allen B. Ury	April 14, 1997	125	0-843-17955-4
Stories include: Brain Drain, Secret Admirer, Clear Channel from Beyond, The Girl Most Likely to..., Strange Visitors, Jungle Fever, The Tip of the Iceberg, Swimming Lessons, Easy Pickin's, Flight to Infinity.
4	Even More Scary Mysteries for Sleep-overs	Allen B. Ury	April 14, 1997	128	0-843-17956-2
Stories include: A Lotto Murder, Live & Learn, Checkmate, Call Me Jody, Stringer, Body Donor, The Beacon, Exclusive Interview, Bear Facts, The Mother Lode.

== See also ==
- Price Stern Sloan
- Scary Stories to Tell in the Dark
- Tales for the Midnight Hour
- Short & Shivery
