= The Burger and the Hot Dog =

2001 children's story by Jim Aylesworth

- First Edition Cover
- Author: Jim Aylesworth
- Illustrator: Stephen Gammell
- Language: English
- Genre: Children's poetry
- Publisher: Atheneum Books for Young Readers
- Publication date: October 1, 2001
- Media type: Print (Hardcover)
- Pages: 32
- ISBN: 978-0-689-83897-2

The Burger and the Hot Dog is a children's poetry book about food, written by Jim Aylesworth and illustrated by Stephen Gammell.

== Summary ==
Several poems have to do with behavior and dessert. There are characters such as cheeses named Woodrow and Wanda and eggs named Yack and Yimmy.

== Reception ==
- A Kirkus Reviews review says, "Caldecott Medalist Gammell (Ride, p. 258, etc.) has cooked up a batch of humorous, mixed-media illustrations in a loose, washy style, using coffee for the brown tones for additional thematic flavor."
- A poem from the book, "The Perfect Couple", was in Cool Story Programs for the School-Age Crowd."
- A Publishers Weekly review says, "The chunky blocks of text share center stage with the smoothly paced images, enhancing the book's visual punch; brushstroked poem titles seem to drip along with the ketchup and mustard. Youngsters will enjoy finding out what the denizens of your neighborhood diner do after the waitresses turn out the lights and go home for the night".
