= Egon Huber =

Austrian ceramicist, sculptor, designer

Egon Huber (1905–1960) was an Austrian designer, ceramicist, sculptor, installation artist, and philhellene, best known for his association with the Industria Ceramiche Artistiche Rodio Orientali (I.C.A.R.O.) company, on the island of Rhodes, in the 1930s and 1940s.

== Early life ==
Born in Bregenz, Austria, in 1905, Huber spent his early years in Salzburg. As a boy, he was interested in all the arts, photography, and music (he played the guitar and violin). He expressed an early desire to become a painter and sculptor and secured a place after World War I at the University of Vienna, adding ceramic arts to his curriculum. After university, he lectured at the Academy of Fine Arts in Vienna.

By his late twenties, Huber embarked on a solo journey from Vienna (or Venice, according to Lawrence Durrell, who came to know Huber well in the 1940s), in a dinghy, via the Danube, the Black Sea, and the Turkish littoral, to Egypt. In 1931, he was caught in a storm off the island of Symi and forced to land on Rhodes in the Dodecanese, at that time in the hands of the Italians. He immediately formed an attachment to the island, and it became his home for the next twenty-five years.

== Industria Ceramiche Artistiche Rodio Orientali (I.C.A.R.O.) ==
In early 1928, an Italian pottery company ‘Industria Ceramiche Artistiche Rodio Orientali’ (I.C.A.R.O.) had been founded on Rhodes, as part of the administration’s plan to industrialise the Dodecanese islands, to produce and market a range of pottery for export generally and to sell to the growing number of European tourists. The business model was based on regenerating early ceramic styles and designs, many of Iznik/Syrian/Levantine origin, popularised by the ateliers of Lindos and Archangelos, on Rhodes’ southern coast, since medieval times. Hearing of Huber’s background in ceramics, a meeting took place with I.C.A.R.O. director Alfred Biliotti, who offered the Austrian a position as ceramic designer. The creative team included two Italians, Luigi de Lerma and Dario Poppi, and, briefly, the German potter Günther Stüdemann. Huber’s distinctive designs and use of colour made him a key figure in I.C.A.R.O.’s initial phase (1928 - c. 1942) and he was appointed its first artistic director.

== Friendship with Lawrence Durrell ==
There are many references to Huber in Lawrence Durrell’s Reflections on a Marine Venus (1953). Durrell was stationed on Rhodes as Information Officer for two years when the Dodecanese were under British administration (1945-1947). He describes Huber as “a born solitary, tall, fair-haired... one of the aristocrats of the spirit — the poor artist who wishes for nothing but a chance to create.” World War II effectively brought an end to I.C.A.R.O.’s first, deemed the best, period. Huber spent time beach-combing and fishing, He made vases as house-warming presents for Durrell’s new home: “I remember so vividly the thump of the clay on the wheel, and the gradual emergence of their fine stems under the broad thumbs of Egon Huber”. A photograph exists of Huber at his wheel. The title of Durrell’s book on Rhodes has an association with Huber, who was present when the eponymous ‘Marine Venus’ was buried, in late 1942, to keep it out of the hands of the approaching Germans.

Durrell’s version of events concerning Huber’s arrival on Rhodes is contradicted by contemporary local resident Andonis Vratsalis in the latter’s book on the district of Niochori, where both Huber and Durrell lived: “One morning in 1930, a tall handsome man with two more seafaring Austrians, who were making their way around the world by sail and by oar, were pushed ashore by the waves in the small harbour of Mandraki in a narrow little dugout boat. His name was Egon Hubert [sic]. And he came ashore to explore the island with his companions.”

== Metamorphosis and IKAROS ==
The German occupation of the Dodecanese and the duration of World War II led to a second, less productive phase for the ceramics firm, with Huber obliged to focus less on I.C.A.R.O. and more on designing propaganda material. By this time, the artist was living in one of the medieval windmills on the northern point of Rhodes town. Durrell calls it “a little Martello tower much ruined by damp and neglect. How he avoided having to join the German Army is a miracle... He works in desultory fashion at the ruined workshop outside the town where in the past this world-famous pottery brought him tourists in their thousands and where shortage of clay has reduced him to poverty.”

When the Italian colonists ceded Rhodes and the Dodecanese to Greece officially in 1947, the assets of I.C.A.R.O. were acquired by a Rhodian entrepreneur, who rebadged the new Greek company as IKAROS, and it continued to produce decorative and popular ceramics until 1988. The metamorphosed pottery enterprise lasted 60 years, and the output from the firm’s first phase is now widely collected, based much on Huber's work.

== Marriage and later life ==
Huber left his old firm in 1947 to start a rival company on Rhodes on the main road to Lindos, an offshoot of the large Athenian ceramics manufacturer – Kerameikos S.A. While arranging this in Athens, Huber, now in his forties, met a chemistry student, Elpida Bianchini, who was working as a colour specialist in the Kerameikos factory at Neo Phaliro. They married, and Elpida came to Rhodes, where the couple had a daughter. Huber ran "Kerameikos - To Rodini" from 1947 until the factory closed eight years later.

Huber, now out of work, moved his family to Athens, where he was taken on as a painter in the main Kerameikos factory, near which he lived. In 1956, Huber and his family then moved temporarily back to Vienna to begin a collaboration with his friend the sculptor Rudolf Hoflehner (1916-1995). In 1960 Huber was back in Athens and he and Hoflehner were commissioned to represent Austria at the Venice Biennale that Autumn. Huber busied himself preparing a series of large pieces in stone and iron, but he died that summer in Athens, aged 55. His place at the Biennale was taken by the Austrian painter Max Weiler.

== Huber's work and legacy ==
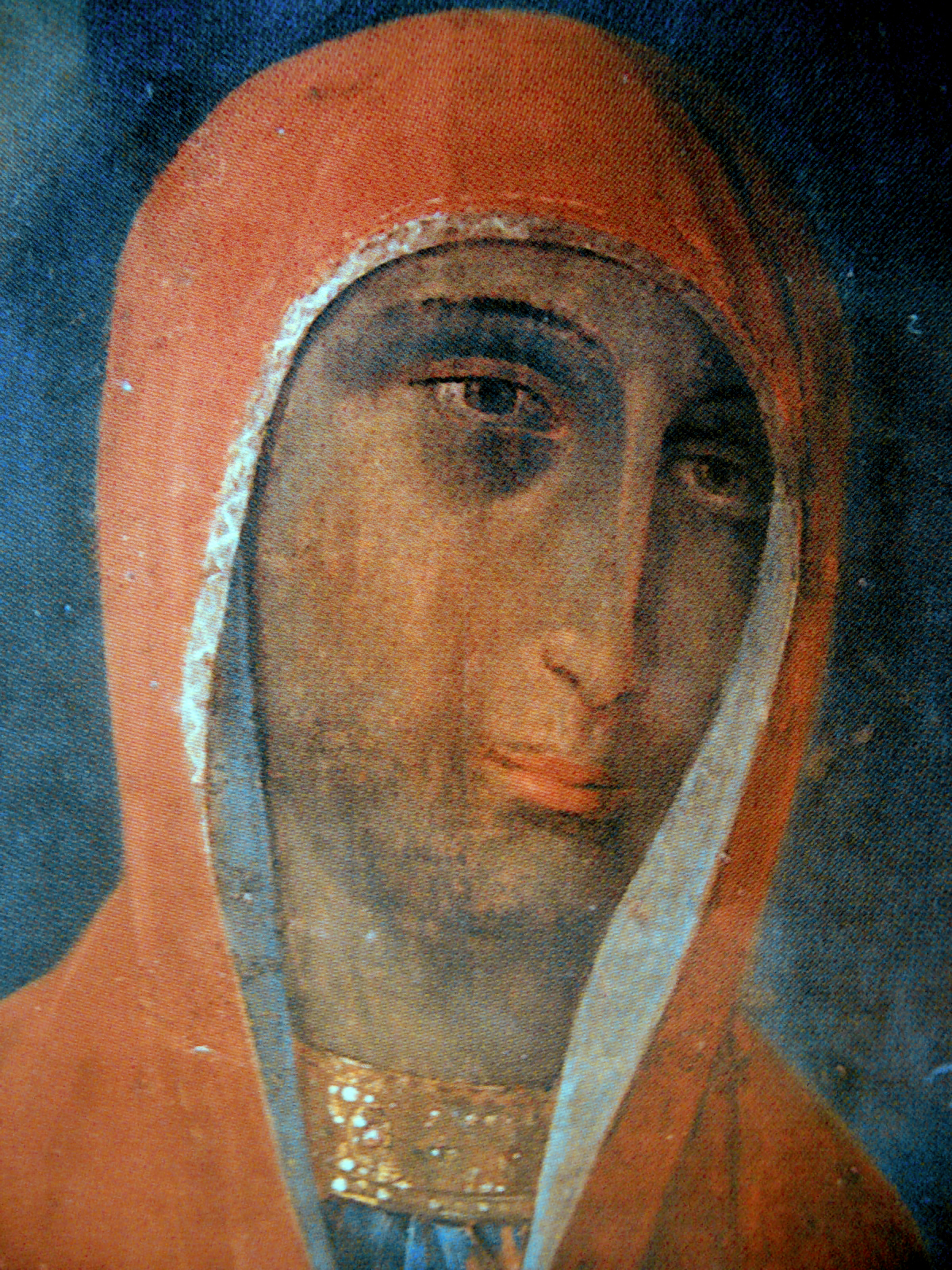
19th-century copy kept in Assisi of the Lady of Philerimos on which Huber based his set of ceramic tiles now to be seen in the Street of Knights, Rhodes.

Examples of Huber’s early work are in the Benaki Museum, Athens, and private collections. In particular, the Benaki displays a series Huber’s popular figurines of women in traditional island costumes He specialised in scenes composed of ceramic tiles, including a representation of the icon of the Virgin of Filerimos, decorative plaques for the port authorities and administration offices of the wider region, and the tile scene ‘La bella Martana, De Mastro De Lindo’ today in the courtyard behind I.C.A.R.O.’s former showroom at the bottom of the Street of Knights in Rhodes’ Old Town. Numerous other decorative pieces can still be seen around Rhodes town.

Huber’s work featured in the exhibition “ICARO – ΙΚΑΡΟΣ The Factory of Rhodes 1928-1988” in 2017 in Athens and 2018 on Rhodes. The accompanying video includes a section on Huber, adding that: “The inclusion of the Austrian ceramist Egon Huber, first as a designer and later as artistic director at ICARO, proved to be particularly important in enriching and renewing the company’s artistic repertoire with new ideas inspired by ancient history, medieval legends, and the island’s local traditions.”

In 1935, Huber designed a pictorial colour map/poster (69 cm x 49 cm) of Rhodes for the Italian State Tourist Department (ENIT), promoting his island and its legends, history and traditions. The composition is dominated by Huber’s interpretation of the Colossus.

Recently (2025), the Conservation Department of the Service of Modern Monuments and Technical Works of the Dodecanese (Rhodes) – Hellenic Ministry of Culture, has identified some pebble mosaics from within the grounds of the former ‘Kerameikos - To Rodini’ factory (now a secondary school), where Huber was manager, as bearing the hallmarks of his work.

Huber’s Rhodian-inspired decorative style continues to interest young ceramicists. In June 2023, the ICARO Contemporary Art Gallery, Athens, ran an exhibition (“Hic Rhodus”) featuring contemporary artists asked to create works representing the legacy of ICARO RODI. These included several pieces based on Huber’s designs, such as his set of tiles depicting the Garden of Eden, commissioned by local businessman Edward Coffino.
