= Tales for the Midnight Hour =

Children's book series by J.B. Stamper

- First edition
- Author: Judith Bauer Stamper
- Country: United States
- Language: English
- Genre: Horror, children's
- Publisher: Scholastic
- Published: 1977-1991

Tales for the Midnight Hour is a series of scary children's books written by Judith Bauer Stamper. This anthology horror series served as the precursor to various other similar works, including Scary Stories to Tell in the Dark and Scary Stories for Sleep-overs. Published by Scholastic's Point Horror banner, this popular series spawned 3 sequels and lasted from 1977-1991.

== Overview ==
The series was written for a younger audience, but was told much darker than many books of the time. With the exception of the first volume, each book contained 13 stories, usually involving youths trying to find their way out of spooky/paranormal situations.

In 1992, the first book in the series was released on audiobook in cassette form.

The series has since been republished in 2005, with new cover art, in a 2-volume collection.

== Books ==
| # | Title | Author | Original published date | Pages | ISBN |
|---|---|---|---|---|---|
| 1 | Tales for the Midnight Hour | J.B. Stamper | 1977 | 124 | 0-590-44502-2 |
Stories include: The furry collar, The black velvet ribbon, The boarder, The ten claws, The jigsaw puzzle, The face, The mirror, The Egyptian coffin, The old plantation, Phobia, The train through Transylvania, The attic door, The tunnel of terror, The fortune teller, The stuffed dog, A free place to sleep, The gooney birds.
| 2 | More Tales for the Midnight Hour | J.B. Stamper | 1987 | 117 | 0-590-41184-5 |
Stories include: The shortcut, Trick-or-treat, The hearse, At midnight, The black mare, The love charm, The mask, Right inn, The collector, A ghost story, In the lantern's light, Footsteps, A night in the woods.
| 3 | Still More Tales for the Midnight Hour | J.B. Stamper | 1989 | 122 | 0-590-42027-5 |
Stories include: Cemetery Road, Wax Museum, Tailypo, Words of Warning, Ghost's Revenge, Special Treat, Magic Vanishing Box, Wait Till Max Comes, Old Beggar Woman, Masked Ball, Skin-and-Bones, Snake Charmer, Snipe Hunt.
| 4 | Even More Tales for the Midnight Hour | J.B. Stamper | 1991 | 120 | 0-590-44143-4 |
Stories include: Voices, The gecko, The head, Better late than never, The golden arm, Dead man's cave, The midnight feeding, When darkness comes, King of the cats, The white dove, Cemetery hill, Claustrophobia, Island of fear.
| V1 | Tales for the Midnight Hour, Volume 1 | J.B. Stamper | 2005 | 245 | 0-760-76775-0 |
30 stories collected from the first 2 volumes in the series. Stories include: The furry collar, The black velvet ribbon, The boarder, The ten claws, The jigsaw puzzle, The face, The mirror, The Egyptian coffin, The old plantation, Phobia, The train through Transylvania, The attic door, The tunnel of terror, The fortune teller, The stuffed dog, A free place to sleep, The gooney birds. The shortcut, Trick-or-treat, The hearse, At midnight, The black mare, The love charm, The mask, Right inn, The collector, A ghost story, In the lantern's light, Footsteps, A night in the woods.
| V2 | Tales for the Midnight Hour, Volume 2 | J.B. Stamper | 2005 | 246 | 0-760-76776-9 |
26 stories collected from the last 2 volumes in the series. Stories include: Cemetery Road, Wax Museum, Tailypo, Words of Warning, Ghost's Revenge, Special Treat, Magic Vanishing Box, Wait Till Max Comes, Old Beggar Woman, Masked Ball, Skin-and-Bones, Snake Charmer, Snipe Hunt, Voices, The gecko, The head, Better late than never, The golden arm, Dead man's cave, The midnight feeding, When darkness comes, King of the cats, The white dove, Cemetery hill, Claustrophobia, Island of fear.

== See also ==
- Scholastic Books
- Scary Stories to Tell in the Dark
- Scary Stories for Sleep-overs
- Short & Shivery
