= The Spider Bite =

Urban legend

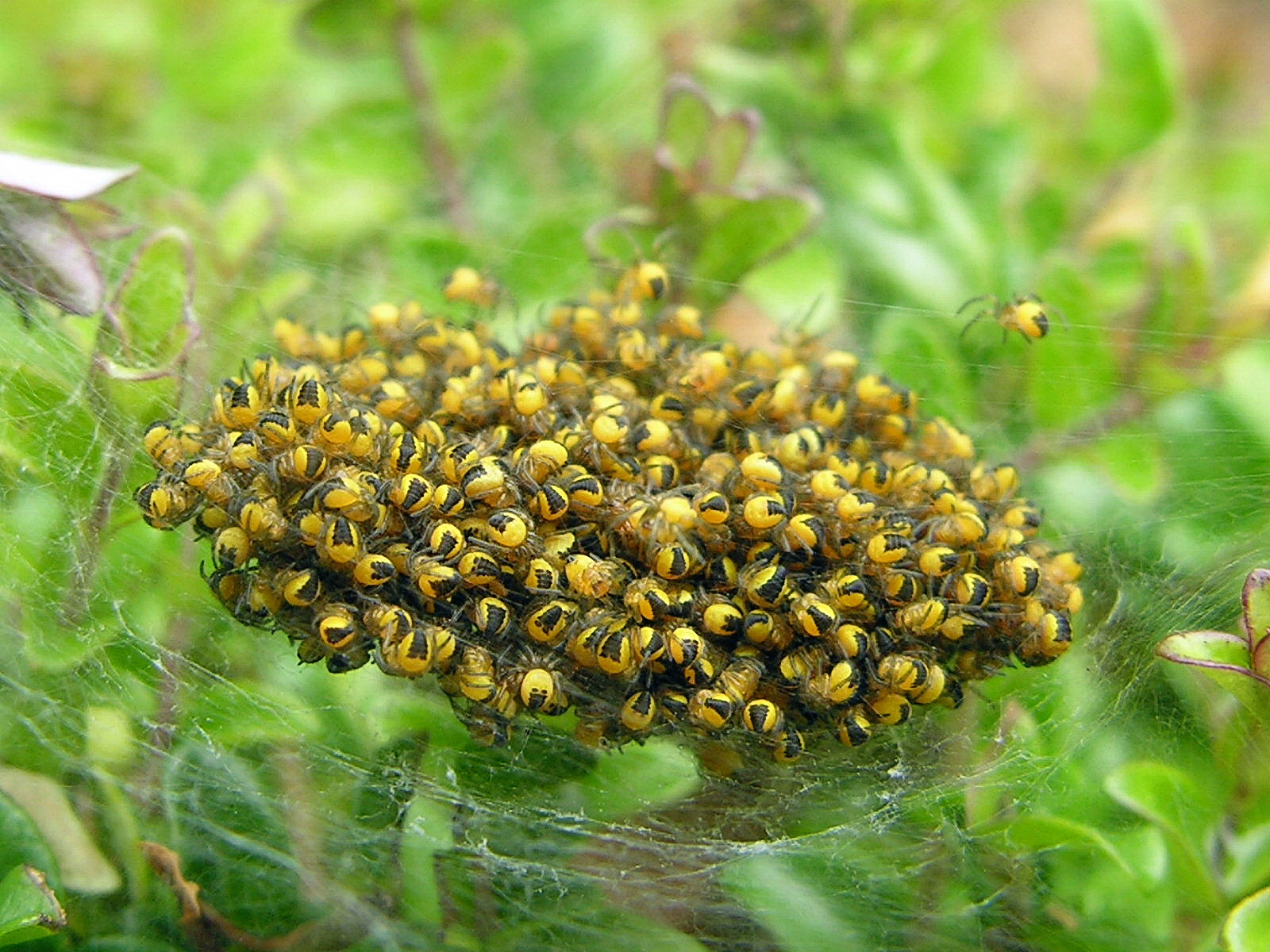
Newly hatched Araneus diadematus

The Spider Bite or The Red Spot is a modern urban legend that emerged in England during the 1970s.

The legend features a young woman from a frigid, northern location (England, New York City, etc.), who is on vacation abroad in a warm southern location (Mexico, etc.). While sunbathing on the beach, she is bitten on the cheek by a spider. The bite swells into a large boil and she rushes home to seek medical treatment. She finds a doctor to lance the boil, causing hundreds of tiny spiders to emerge. She is driven insane by the shock.

== History ==
The legend of The Spider Bite emerged as a modern legend in Europe in the late 1970s, but it echoes earlier manifestations of the bosom-serpent story type, where all types of creatures enter the body and sometimes reproduce there. Modern folklorists adopted the term bosom-serpent from Nathaniel Hawthorne's 1843 short story, "Egotism, or, the Bosom Serpent". The term is now used to generalize other legends in which living creatures enter the human body. In bosom-serpent type legends, the creatures usually have to be removed surgically, but sometimes they depart on their own, or even burst from the skin.

== Interpretations ==
This urban legend provides a social commentary about the perception of the people who consider southern locales to be less clean, and more dangerous than their own home turf. Spiders are loathed by many people, but venomous, hairy, or especially large spiders make frequent appearances in legends. Spiders in urban legends have often taken cover in a variety of items ranging from cactus plants and food, to hairdos and within the human body, so it is natural to have a fear of invasion. Bengt af Klintberg's work in urban legends elaborates and explains that as a consequence of the absence of spiders in the modern urban environment, they have now assumed mythical proportions in our narrative tradition. Analysts have also suggested that bosom-serpent legends may represent pregnancy fears or fantasies.

== Variations ==
In other versions, a young girl is asleep while a spider crawls across her face and rests on her cheek for a few moments. The next morning, she asks her mother about the red spot on her cheek and the mother responds, "It looks like a spider bite. It will go away, just don't scratch it." As time passes, the spot grows into a small boil. She confronts her mother again and complains that it is getting larger and that it's sore. The mother replies, "That happens sometimes, it's coming to a head." More days pass and the girl complains that it hurts and is unsightly. Finally concerned that it might be infected, the mother agrees to take her to a doctor, but he is not available until the next day. In order to soothe herself that evening, the girl takes a bath. As she soaks, the boil bursts and releases a swarm of baby spiders into the water from the eggs that the spider had laid.

In telling the story, there are versions that are set in one's own country instead of being abroad (e.g., a Midwestern woman who is bitten in California). Usually, when the story is told to others, the location of the incident is quite specific.

== In popular culture ==
In the 2005 horror film Urban Legends: Bloody Mary, the character Heather Thompson meets a gruesome fate following a spider bite. Mistaking the bite for a simple pimple, she pops it, unleashing a swarm of spiders that crawl out from the wound. Overcome with terror, Heather frantically tries to rid herself of the arachnids by peeling at her skin. In her panic, she crashes into a mirror, shattering the glass. The shards embed into her face. Desperate and delirious, Heather continues to tear at her skin, eventually peeling off her face before succumbing to her injuries.

In the 2019 horror film Scary Stories To Tell in the Dark, the character Ruth is subject to a spider bite and hospitalized (then sent to a mental hospital). In this version her cheek swells from a red spot and turns to a large boil then releasing the spiders after she tries to investigate the spot. This transformation being relatively fast over the course of a day with the spiders clawing their way out of her cheek during the evening.

== Sources ==
- Af Klintberg, B. (1985). "Legends and Rumours about Spiders and Snakes". Fabula. 26 (3–4): 274–87. doi:10.1515/fabl.1985.26.3-4.274. S2CID 201725102.
- Brunvand, Jan Harold (2001). Encyclopedia of Urban Legends. New York: W. W. Norton & Company. ISBN 0-393-32358-7.
- Schwartz, Alvin (1991). Scary Stories 3: More Tales to Chill Your Bones. New York: Harper Trophy. ISBN 0-06-440418-8.

== See also ==
- Cultural depictions of spiders § Modern myths and urban legends
- The Black Spider, 1842 novella by Jeremias Gotthelf
