= George Ella Lyon =

American writer

- Born: April 25, 1949 (age 77); Harlan, Kentucky, U.S.
- Education: Centre College (BA); University of Arkansas (MA); Indiana University Bloomington (PhD)
- Spouse: Stephen C. Lyon (m. 1972)
- Children: 2

George Ella Lyon (born April 25, 1949, in Harlan, Kentucky) is an American author from Kentucky, who has published in many genres, including picture books, poetry, juvenile novels, and articles.

== Biography ==
George Ella Lyon was born April 25, 1949, in Harlan, Kentucky, a coal mining town in southeastern Kentucky, to Robert Vernon Jr. and Gladys (née Fowler) Hoskins. She married Stephen C. Lyon, a musician, on June 3, 1972, and has since had two children with him.

Lyon received a Bachelor of Arts from Centre College in Kentucky in 1971, a Master of Arts from the University of Arkansas in 1972, and a Doctor of Philosophy from Indiana University Bloomington in 1978.

In 1983, Lyon published her first writing, a poetry collection called Mountain. Aside from publishing, she also taught writing at a number of colleges, including the University of Kentucky, Centre College, Transylvania University, and Radford University. She has also acted as an executive committee member for the Kentucky Women Writers Conference. She currently teaches writing through workshops, conferences, and author visits.

Lyon served as Kentucky Poet Laureate for 2015–16.

== Works ==
In an article in The Reading Teacher, Sylvia Pantaleo notes that Lyon's A Day at Damp Camp bears characteristics of Dresang's Radical Change theory by having a nonlinear story, which artist Peter Catalanotto loops back to the beginning through the illustrations, images, and text within boxes that resemble "hypertext Web links".

Lyon's books frequently take place in Appalachia.

== Bibliography ==
=== Forthcoming works ===
- Voices of Justice: Poems About People Working for a Better World, illustrated by Jennifer M. Potter, Holt Books for Young Readers, 2020.
- Back to the Light: Poems. Univ. Press of Kentucky, 2021.
- Which Side Are you On?, reprinted by Univ. Press of Kentucky, 2021.
- Time to Fly!, illustrated by Mick Wiggins, Atheneum, 2022.

=== Picture books ===
- Father Time and the Day Boxes, illustrated by Robert Andrew Parker, 1985.
- A Regular Rolling Noah, illustrated by Stephen Gammell, 1986.
- A B Cedar: An Alphabet of Trees, illustrated by Tom Parker, 1989.
- Together, illustrated by Vera Rosenberry, 1989.
- Come a Tide, illustrated by Stephen Gammell, 1990.
- Basket, illustrated by Mary Szilagyi, 1990.
- Cecil's Story, illustrated by Peter Catalanotto, 1991.
- The Outside Inn, illustrated by Vera Rosenberry, 1991.
- Who Came Down that Road?, illustrated by Peter Catalanotto, 1992.
- Dreamplace, illustrated by Peter Catalanotto, 1993.
- Five Live Bongos, illustrated by Jacqueline Rogers, 1994.
- Mama Is a Miner, illustrated by Peter Catalanotto, 1994.
- Ada's Pal, illustrated by Marguerite Casparian, 1996.
- A Wordful Child, photographs by Ann W. Olson, 1996.
- A Day at Damp Camp, illustrated by Peter Catalanotto, 1996.
- Counting on the Woods, photographs by Ann W. Olson, 1998.
- A Sign, illustrated by Chris K. Soentpiet, 1998.
- A Traveling Cat, illustrated by Paul Brett Johnson, 1998.
- Book, illustrated by Peter Catalanotto, 1999.
- One Lucky Girl, illustrated by Irene Trivas, 2000.
- Mother to Tigers, illustrated by Peter Catalanotto, 2002.
- Weaving the Rainbow, illustrated by Stephanie Anderson, 2004.
- No Dessert Forever!, illustrated by Peter Catalanotto, 2006. (Originally published as When You Get Little and I Get Big)
- Trucks Roll!, illustrated by Craig Frazier, 2007
- Sleepsong, illustrated by Peter Catalanotto, 2008.
- My Friend, the Starfinder, illustrated by Stephen Gammell, 2008.
- You and Me and Home Sweet Home, illustrated by Stephanie Anderson, 2009.
- The Pirate of Kindergarten, illustrated by Lynne Avril, 2010.
- All the Water in the World, illustrated by Katherine Tillotson, 2011.
- Which Side Are You On? The Story of a Song, illustrated by Christopher Cardinale, 2011.
- Planes Fly!, illustrated by Mick Wiggins, 2013
- What Forest Knows, illustrated by August Hall, 2014.
- Boats Float!, written with Benn Lyon and illustrated by Mick Wiggins, 2015.
- Trains Run!, written with Benn Lyon and illustrated by Mick Wiggins, 2019.

=== Fiction: children/young adult ===
- Borrowed Children, 1988.
- Here and Then, 1994.
- Red Rover, Red Rover, 1989 (published as The Stranger I Left Behind, 1997)
- Gina.Jamie.Father.Bear., 2002.
- Sonny's House of Spies, 2004.
- Holding on to Zoe, 2012.

=== Fiction: adults ===
- Choices: Stories for Adult New Readers, 1989.
- With a Hammer for My Heart, 1996.

=== Poetry ===
- Mountain, 1983.
- Growing Light, 1987.
- Catalpa, 1993.
- Where I'm From, 1993.
- Earth Poems, 2008.
- Back, 2010.
- Woolfwork, 2010.
- She Let Herself Go, 2012.
- Many-Storied House, 2013.
- Voices from the March on Washington, with J. Patrick Lewis, 2014.

=== Miscellaneous works ===
- Braids (two-act play), first produced in Lexington, Kentucky, at Transylvania University, 1985.
- Braids (radio script), 1986.
- Looking Back for Words (play), 1989.
- A Christmas Feast (monologues), 1990.
- (Editor, with Jim Wayne Miller and Gurney Norman) A Gathering at the Forks: Fifteen Years of the Hindman Settlement School Appalachian Writers Workshop, 1993.
- (Editor, with Bob Henry Baber) Old Wounds, New Words: Poems from the Appalachian Poetry Project, 1994.
- With a Hammer for My Heart (stage adaptation by Ed Smith), 1998.
- Where I'm From: Where Poems Come From, photographs by Robert Hoskins, 1999.
- (Editor, with Leatha Kendrick) Crossing Troublesome 25 Years of the Appalachian Writers Workshop, 2002
- (Editor) A Kentucky Christmas, 2003.
- Songs for the Mountaintop (music album), 2006.
- Don't You Remember? (memoir), 2007.
- Sonny's House of Spies (stage adaptation by Alec Volz), 2007.
- Public Outcry (music album), 2008.
- (Editor) Harvest of Fire: New & Collected Works by Lee Howard, 2010
- A Kentucky Christmas (stage adaptation by James W. Rogers), 2015.
- Many-Storied House (readers' theater adaptation by Clint Ibele), 2017.

== Awards ==
- Kentucky Poet Laureate, 2015–17
- Schneider Family Book Award, 2010, American Library Association, for The Pirate of Kindergarten
- Lamont Hall Award, Andrew Mountain Press, 1983, for Mountain
- Golden Kite Award, Society of Children's Book Writers and Illustrators, 1989, for Borrowed Children
- Best Books of the Year citation, Publishers Weekly, for Borrowed Children
- Best Books of the Year citation, School Library Journal, for Borrowed Children
- Best Books of the Year citation, Library of Congress, for Borrowed Children
- Kentucky Bluegrass Award, for Basket and Some Lucky Girl
- Andrew Mountain Press Award, for Mountain
- Book of the Year Award, Appalachian Writers Association, for Catalpa
- Best Books of the Year citation, Publishers Weekly, for Who Came Down that Road?
- Honor Book, Jane Addams Children's Book Award, 2010, for You and Me and Home Sweet Home
- Parents' Choice Award Silver Medal, 2003, for Mother to Tigers
- Cooperative Children's Book Center Choices citation, 2012, for Holding On to Zoe
- Cooperative Children's Book Center Choices citation, 1985, for Father Time and the Day Boxes
- Cooperative Children's Book Center Choices citation, 2010, for You and Me and Home Sweet Home
- Cooperative Children's Book Center Choices citation, 2012, for All the Water in the World
- Cooperative Children's Book Center Choices citation, 2012, for Which Side Are You On? The Story of a Song
- Aesop Prize, American Folklore Society, 2012, for Which Side Are You On? The Story of a Song
- Cybils Award, Poetry, 2014, for Voices from the March on Washington
- Jesse Stuart Media Award, Kentucky School Media Association, for body of work
- Al Smith Fellowship, Kentucky Arts Counsel
- Lee Smith Award, Lincoln Memorial University
- Excellence in Education Award, Carson Newman College
- East Kentucky Leadership Award for Fine Arts
- Emory & Henry College Annual Literary Festival Author, 1994
