= Egon =

Male given name

Egon is a German variant of the male given name Egino. It is most commonly found in Central and Northern Europe. Egon may refer to:

== People ==
- Egon VIII of Fürstenberg-Heiligenberg (1588–1635), Imperial Count of Fürstenberg-Heiligenberg (1618–1635) and a military leader in the Thirty Years' War
- Egon Bahr (1922–2015), German politician
- Egon Bittner (1921–2011), American sociologist
- Egon Bondy (1930–2007), Czech philosopher
- Egon Coordes (1944–2025), German footballer and coach
- Egon Freiherr von Eickstedt (1892–1965), German physical anthropologist
- Egon Eiermann (1904–1970), German architect
- Egon Franke (fencer) (1935–2022), Polish Olympic fencer
- Egon Franke (politician) (1913–1995), German politician
- Egon Frid (born 1957), Swedish politician
- Egon Friedell (1878–1938), Austrian writer
- Egon Guttman (1927–2021), German-American legal scholar
- Egon Henninger (1940–2025), German swimmer
- Egon Huber (1905-1960), Austrian artist
- Egon Hirt (born 1960), German alpine skier
- Egon Jensen (politician) (1922–1985), Danish politician
- Egon Jönsson (1921–2000), Swedish footballer
- Egon Kaur (born 1987), Estonian rally driver
- Egon Kisch (1885–1948), Czechoslovak writer
- Egon Köhnen (born 1947), German footballer
- Egon Krenz (born 1937), German politician, last leader of East Germany
- Egon Loy (1931–2026), German football goalkeeper
- Egon Mayer (1917–1944), German fighter pilot during World War II
- Egon Müller (born 1948) German former international motorcycle speedway rider
- Egon Nuter (born 1955), Estonian actor
- Egon Pearson (1895–1980), British statistician
- Egon Petri (1881–1962), Dutch pianist
- Egon Piechaczek (1931–2006), Polish footballer and football manager
- Egon Ramms (born 1948), German general
- Egon Rannet (1911–1983), Estonian writer
- Egon Ronay (1915–2010), Hungarian food critic and writer in the UK and Ireland
- Egon Roolaid (1918–1943), Estonian freestyle swimmer
- Egon Schidan (1930–2002), German boxer
- Egon Schiele (1890–1918), Austrian painter
- Egon Scotland (1948–1991), German journalist
- Egon Sendler (1923–2014), French Roman Catholic priest
- Egon von Fürstenberg (1946–2004), German fashion designer
- Egon von Vietinghoff (1903–1994), Swiss painter
- Egon Wellesz (1885–1974), Austrian, later British composer
- Egon Wolff (1926–2016), Chilean playwright
- Egon Zimmermann (1939–2019), Austrian alpine skier
- Eothen "Egon" Alapatt (1970s– ), American music executive

== Fictional characters ==
- Egon Olsen, the mob boss in the Olsen Gang films.
- Egon Spengler, the scientist in the Ghostbusters series.
- Egon Tiedemann, the chief of police of Winden in the German television series Dark.

== Business organizations ==
- Egon (restaurants), a restaurant chain in Norway
