= Stephen Gammell =

American book illustrator

Stephen Gammell (born February 10, 1943) is an American illustrator of children's books. He won the 1989 Caldecott Medal for U.S. picture book illustration, recognizing Song and Dance Man by Karen Ackerman. His illustrations in Where the Buffaloes Begin by Olaf Baker (1982) and The Relatives Came by Cynthia Rylant (1986) earned those titles the designation of Caldecott Honor books. Although he is most widely known for his evocative, nightmarish illustrations for Alvin Schwartz's Scary Stories to Tell in the Dark trilogy, he has illustrated seventy books between 1973 and 2013, including nine which he authored himself.

== Biography ==
Gammell grew up in Iowa. His father, an art editor for a major magazine, brought home periodicals that gave Stephen early artistic inspiration. His parents also supplied him with plenty of pencils, paper, and encouragement. He is self-taught.

He started his career with freelance commercial work, but became interested in children's book illustration. His first picture book was published by G. P. Putnam's Sons in 1973: A Nutty Business by Ida Chittum, featuring a "war" between squirrels and a farmer. That same year he illustrated The Search (Harper & Row, 1973), a juvenile biography of Leo Tolstoy by Sara Newton Carroll.

Gammell is particularly known for the surreal, unsettling illustrations he provided for Scary Stories to Tell in the Dark, a series of horror short stories by Alvin Schwartz that is still an adolescent favorite.

He and his wife, photographer Linda Gammell, live in St. Paul, Minnesota. He works daily in his studio, located over a restaurant.

== Works ==
- 1973 A Nutty Business (by Ida Chittum)
- 1973 The Search: A Biography of Leo Tolstoy (by Sara Newton Carroll)
- 1974 Let Me Hear You Whisper: A Play (by Paul Zindel)
- 1974 The Wyndcliffe (by Louise Lawrence) (cover illustration only)
- 1975 Thunder at Gettysburg (by Patricia Lee Gauch)
- 1975 Nabby Adams' Diary (by Miriam Anne Bourne)
- 1976 Meet the Werewolf (by Georgess McHargue)
- 1976 The Kelpie's Pearls (by Mollie Hunter)
- 1976 Ghosts (by Seymour Simon)
- 1977 A Furl of Fairy Wind (by Mollie Hunter)
- 1977 Alice Yazzie's Year (by Ramona Maher)
- 1977 The Wicked One (by Mollie Hunter)
- 1978 The Hawks of Chelney (by Adrienne Jones)
- 1978 Day of the Blizzard (by Marietta Moskin)
- 1978 The Ghost of Tillie Jean Cassaway (by Ellen Harvey Showell)
- 1979 A Net to Catch the Wind (by Margaret Greaves)
- 1979 Leo Possessed (by Dilys Owen)
- 1979 Yesterday's Island (by Eve Bunting)
- 1979 Stonewall (by Jean Fritz)
- 1979 Meet the Vampire (by Georgess McHargue)
- 1980 And Then the Mouse... Three Stories (by Malcolm Hall)
- 1980 Terrible Things: An Allegory of the Holocaust (by Eve Bunting)
- 1980 Blackbird Singing (by Eve Bunting)
- 1981 Flash and the Swan (by Ann Brophy)
- 1981 Where the Buffaloes Begin (by Olaf Baker) —Caldecott Honor
- 1981 Once Upon MacDonald's Farm (by Stephen Gammell)
- 1981 Demo and the Dolphin (by Nathaniel Benchley)
- 1981 Wake Up, Bear...It's Christmas! (by Stephen Gammell)
- 1981 Scary Stories to Tell in the Dark (by Alvin Schwartz)
- 1982 The Story of Mr. and Mrs. Vinegar (by Stephen Gammell)
- 1982 The Best Way to Ripton (by Maggie S. Davis)
- 1983 Git Along, Old Scudder (by Stephen Gammell)
- 1983 The Old Banjo (by Dennis Haseley)
- 1984 Waiting to Waltz (by Cynthia Rylant)
- 1984 The Real Tom Thumb (by Helen Reeder Cross)
- 1984 Thaddeus (by Alison Cragin Herzig, Jane Lawrence Mali)
- 1984 More Scary Stories to Tell in the Dark (by Alvin Schwartz)
- 1985 Who Kidnapped the Sheriff?: Tales from Tickfaw (by Larry Callen)
- 1985 Thanksgiving Poems (by Myra Cohn Livingston)
- 1986 The Relatives Came (by Cynthia Rylant) —Caldecott Honor
- 1986 A Regular Rolling Noah (by George Ella Lyon)
- 1987 Old Henry (by Joan Blos)
- 1987 The Great Dimpole Oak (by Janet Taylor Lisle)
- 1988 Song and Dance Man (by Karen Ackerman) —Caldecott Medal
- 1988 Airmail to the Moon (by Tom Birdseye)
- 1989 Dancing Teepees: Poems of American Indian Youth (by Virginia Driving Hawk Sneve)
- 1989 Halloween Poems (by Myra Cohn Livingston)
- 1989 Will's Mammoth (by Rafe Martin)
- 1990 Come a Tide (by George Ella Lyon)
- 1990 Wing-A-Ding (by Lyn Littlefield Hoopes)
- 1991 The Wing Shop (by Elvira Woodruff)
- 1991 Scary Stories 3: More Tales to Chill Your Bones (by Alvin Schwartz)
- 1992 The Old Black Fly (by Jim Aylesworth)
- 1993 Monster Mama (by Liz Rosenberg)
- 1997 Is That You, Winter? (by Stephen Gammell)
- 1997 You Be the Bread and I'll Be the Cheese: Showing How We Care (by Scott Foresman) (contributing illustrator)
- 2000 Twigboy (by Stephen Gammell)
- 2001 Ride (by Stephen Gammell)
- 2001 The Burger and the Hot Dog (by Jim Aylesworth)
- 2001 The Art Contest (by Stephen Gammell)
- 2002 Humble Pie (by Jennifer Donnelly)
- 2003 Swing Around the Sun (by Barbara Juster Esbensen) (contributing illustrator)
- 2003 Hey, Pancakes! (by Tamson Weston)
- 2005 Timothy Cox Will Not Change His Socks (by Robert Kinerk)
- 2006 The Secret Science Project That Almost Ate the School (by Judy Sierra)
- 2008 My Friend, the Starfinder (by George Ella Lyon)
- 2008 I Know an Old Teacher (by Anne Bowen)
- 2009 How the Nobble Was Finally Found (by C.K. Williams)
- 2009 I Did It Anyway (by Liz Rosenberg) (publication cancelled)
- 2011 Mudkin (by Stephen Gammell)
- 2012 Laugh-Out-Loud Baby (by Tony Johnston)
- 2013 The Frazzle Family Finds a Way (by Ann Bonwill)
