= Karen Ackerman =

American author of children's books

- Born: October 9, 1951 (age 74); Cincinnati, Ohio, U.S.
- Education: Woodward High School
- Occupation: children's author
- Writing career
- Language: English
- Notable work: Song and Dance Man (1988)
- Notable awards: Caldecott Medal (1989)

Karen Ackerman (born October 10, 1951, Cincinnati, Ohio) is an American author of children's books.

== Background ==
She was born in Cincinnati, Ohio, and she graduated from Woodward High School in 1969.

== Career ==
Ackerman's first children's book was published in 1982. She has since published over twenty-five books. Her books have won many awards including Parents' Choice, ABA Pick of the List, ALA Notable Books, Children's Book Council/NCSS Notable Books in the Field of Social Studies, New York Library Best List, Horn Book's Best, and School Library Journal Best Books.

Her picture-book Song and Dance Man, illustrated by Stephen Gammell, won the 1989 Caldecott Medal. The book was adapted into a children's theater production at the Sunset Playhouse in Elm Grove, Wisconsin in 2019.

== Awards ==
Caldecott Medal, 1989, for the book Song and Dance Man, illustrated by Stephen Gammell, Knopf, 1988

== Bibliography ==
=== Picture books ===
- Flannery Row, illustrated by Karen Ann Weinhaus. New York: Atlantic Monthly (1986)
- Song & Dance Man, illustrated by Stephen Gammell. (1988)
- Theo's Vineyard, illustrated by Mary Helen Wallace. (1989)
- Araminta's Paint Box, illustrated by Betsy Lewin. (1990)
- The Banshee, illustrated by David Ray. New York: Philomel (1990)
- Just Like Max, illustrated by George Schmidt. New York: Knopf (1990)
- The Tin Heart, illustrated by Michael Hays. (1990)
- Moveable Mabeline, illustrated by Linda Allen. (1990)
- When Mama Retires, illustrated by Alexa Grace. New York: Knopf (1992)
- I Know A Place, illustrated by Deborah Kogan Ray. New York: Houghton Mifflin (1992)
- This Old House, illustrated by Sylvie Wickstrom. New York: Atheneum (1992)
- By the Dawn's Early Light, illustrated by Catherine Stock. (1994)
- The Sleeping Porch, illustrated by Elizabeth Sayles. New York: Morrow (1995)
- Bingleman's Midway, illustrated by Barry Moser. Honesdale: Boyds Mills Press (1995)
- In the Park With Dad: A Story for Kids Whose Parents Don't Live Together, illustrated by Linda Crockett-Blassingame. Boston: Pauline Books and Media (1996)
- Walking With Clara Belle, illustrated by Debbie Mason. Boston: Pauline Books and Media (1996)
- Bean's Big Day, illustrated by Paul Mombourquette. (2004)

=== Fiction ===
- The Leaves in October (1991)
- The Broken Boy. New York: Philomel (1991)
- The Night Crossing (1994)
