= Georgess McHargue =

American writer and poet (1941–2011)

Georgess McHargue (June 7, 1941 – July 18, 2011) was an American writer and poet.

== Biography ==
McHargue was born in New York City. After working at Golden Press, she became an editor at Doubleday. She had a long career working as an author; she published 35 books including children's fiction and nonfiction works on archaeology, history, mythology and paranormal studies. She also wrote about folklore and the occult.

She was nominated for a National Book Award for The Beasts of Never (1988) and she wrote many reviews for The New York Times Book Review.

McHargue eventually moved to Groton, Massachusetts, where she edited reports on archaeology and history for the Michael's Institute for Conservation Archaeology at Harvard's Peabody Museum and for their historic preservation company Timelines Inc. Her book Facts, Frauds, and Phantasms: A Survey of the Spiritualist Movement (1972) was a skeptical study of spiritualism. The book exposed fraudulent mediums and was described in one review as a "well researched and intriguing case study in human gullibility."

== Published books ==
=== Fiction ===
- Elidor and the Golden Ball (Dodd, Mead & Company, 1973)
- Private Zoo (Viking, 1975)
- Stoneflight (Viking, 1975)
- Funny Bananas: The Mystery in the Museum (Holt, 1975)
- The Talking Table Mystery (Doubleday, 1977)
- The Horseman's Word (Delacorte, 1981)
- The Turquoise Toad Mystery (Delacorte, 1982)
- See You Later, Crocodile (Delacorte, 1988)

=== Nonfiction ===
- The Beasts of Never: A History Natural & Un-natural of Monsters Mythical & Magical (Bobbs-Merrill, 1968) – 112 pages, LCCN 67-18651
- Facts, Frauds, and Phantasms: A Survey of the Spiritualist Movement (Doubleday, 1972)
- The Impossible People: A History Natural and Unnatural of Beings Terrible and Wonderful (Holt, Rinehart and Winston, 1972)
- Mummies (Lippincott, 1972)
- The Beasts of Never (Delacorte, 1988) – revised and expanded edition, x+118 pp, LCCN 86-29374
- A Field Guide to Conservation Archaeology in North America (1977)
