= Our Lady of Philermos =

Byzantine Christian icon

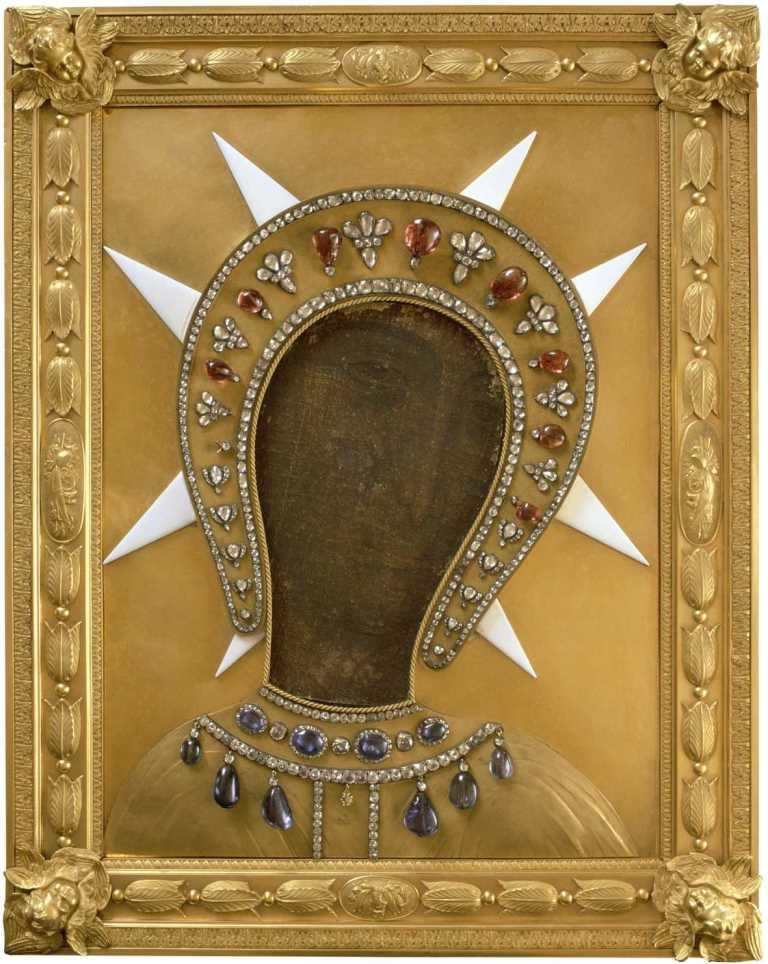
Icon of Our Lady of Philermos

Our Lady of Philermos (also Phileremos, Philerme, Filerimos; Greek: Εικόνα της Υπεραγίας Θεοτόκου της Φιλερήμου, Russian: Филермская икона Божией Матери) is a Byzantine icon of the Theotokos, dated to the 11th or 12th century. Originally kept at Phileremos Monastery in Rhodes and then in Malta, the icon has long been venerated as the patroness of the Knights Hospitaller and the Sovereign Military Order of Malta. It is now kept in the Museum of Art and History in Cetinje, Montenegro.

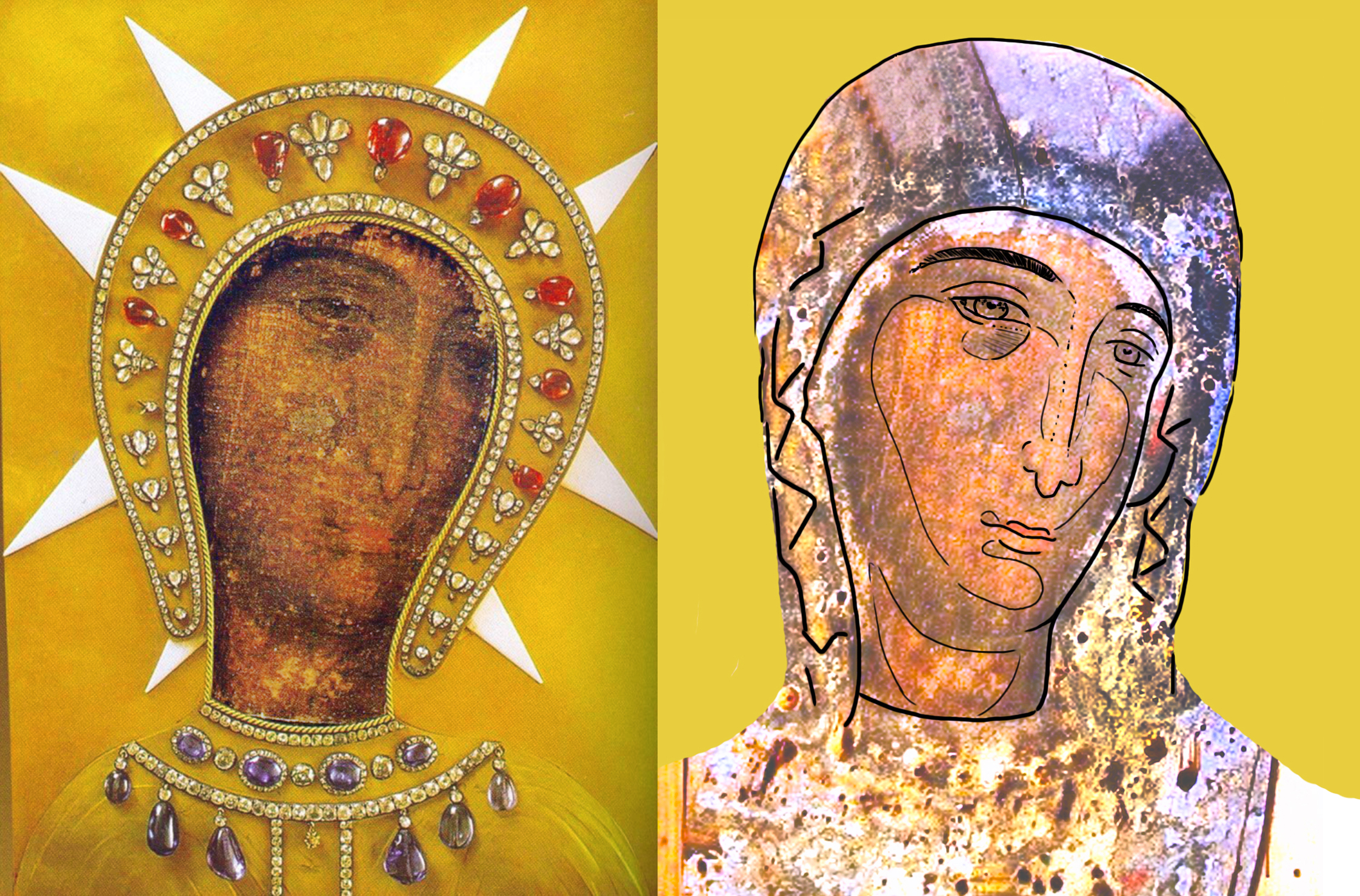
The icon shown with and without riza.

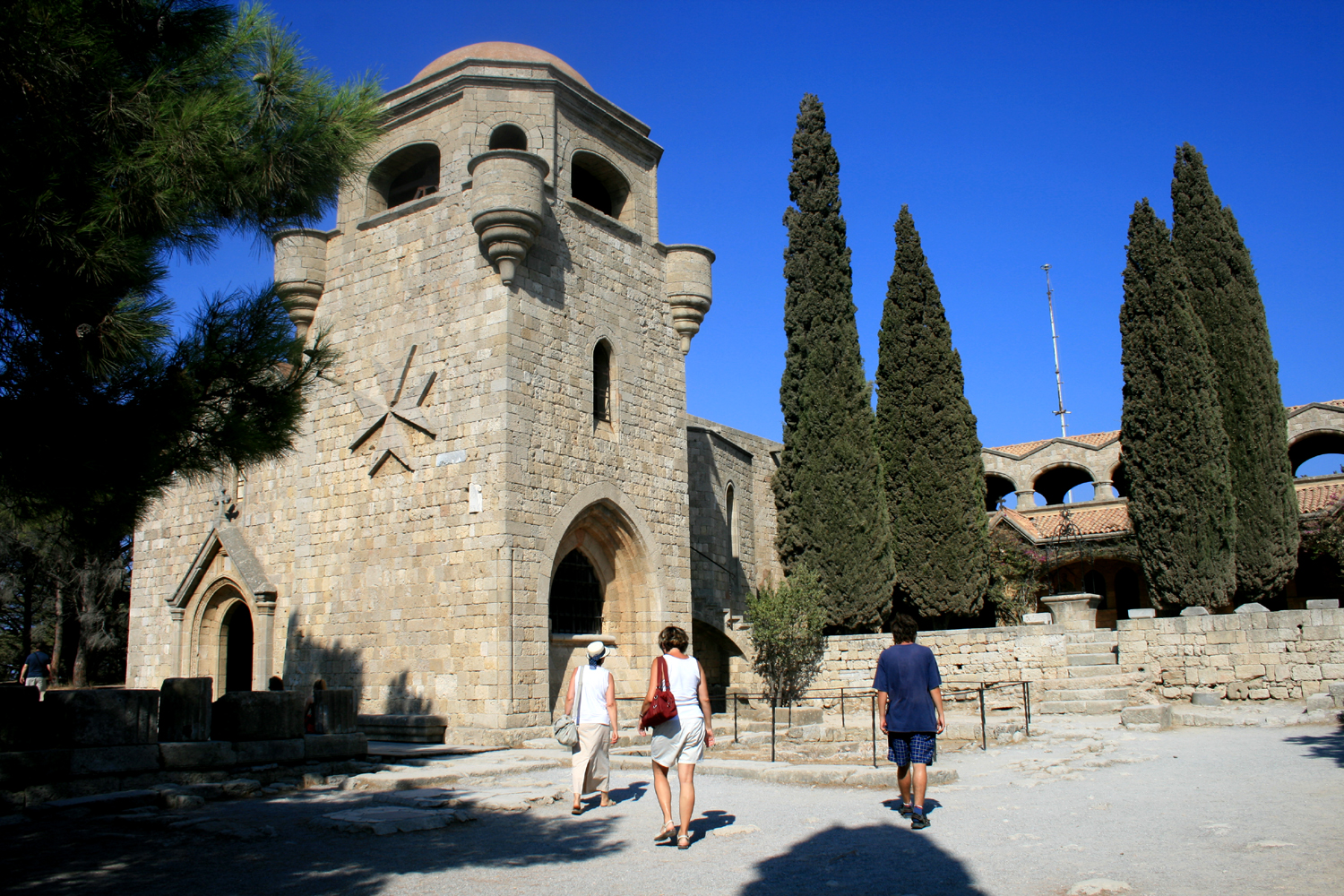
Phileremos monastery, Rhodes.

The icon is tempera on wood, 44 by 36 cm. It depicts just the head of the Virgin Mary. Her face is seen in three-quarters profile, slightly inclined towards her left shoulder. The face is oval with a long nose in the Byzantine style.

The icon was kept at Phileremos Monastery, Rhodes, presumably since the 12th century, although it was often said to have been brought to Rhodes from the Holy Land. It was captured by the Knights Hospitaller in their conquest of Rhodes in 1306/1310. Her fame is due to miracles attributed to her intercession, primarily in the Siege of Rhodes (1480). After the loss of Rhodes in 1522, the icon was rescued, and attached to the mainmast of the Santa Maria, a carrack captured from the Sultan of Egypt in 1507, during the Order's years of exile.

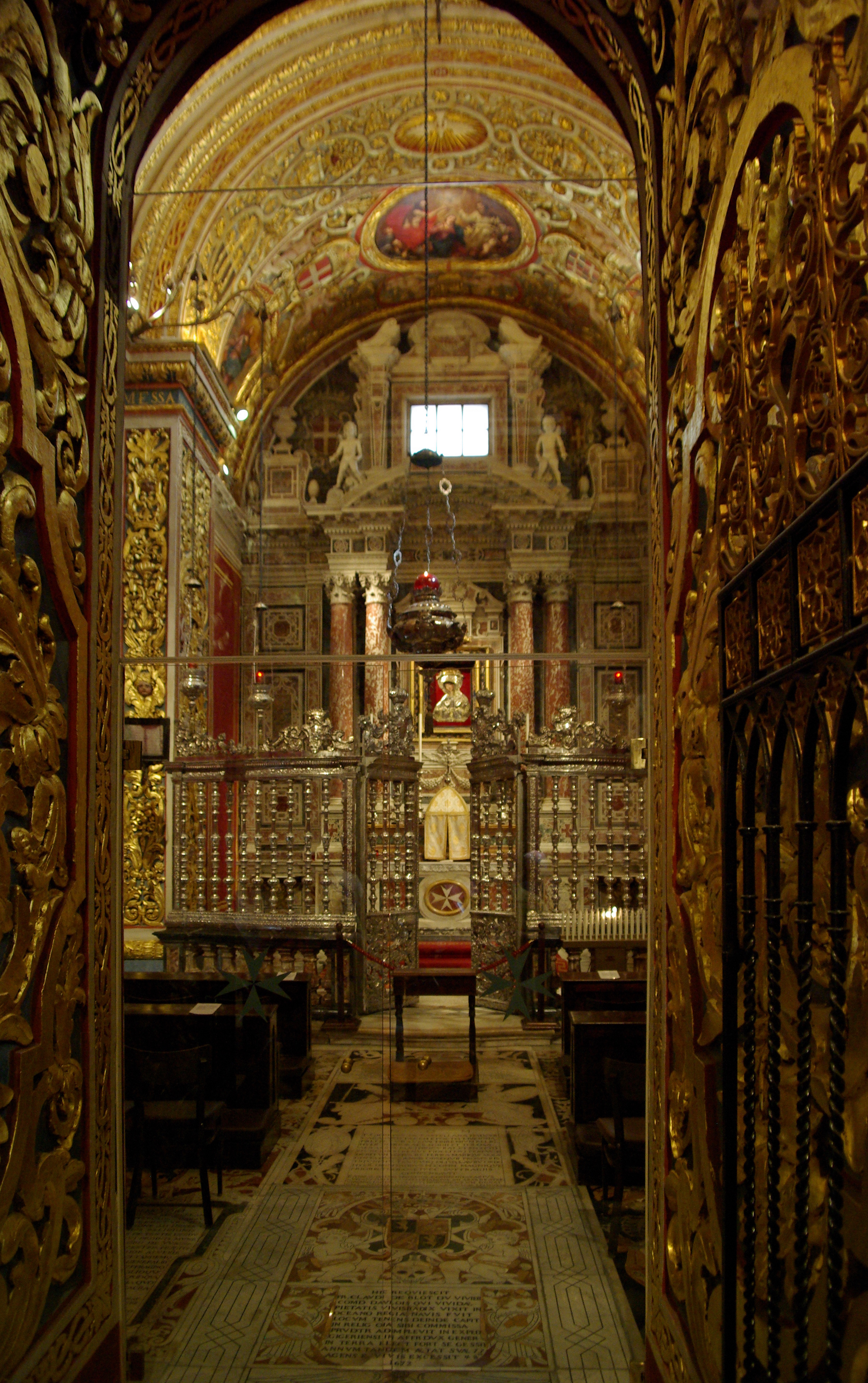
Chapel of Our Lady of Philermos at St John's Co-Cathedral, Valletta, Malta, where the icon was kept from the 1570s to 1798

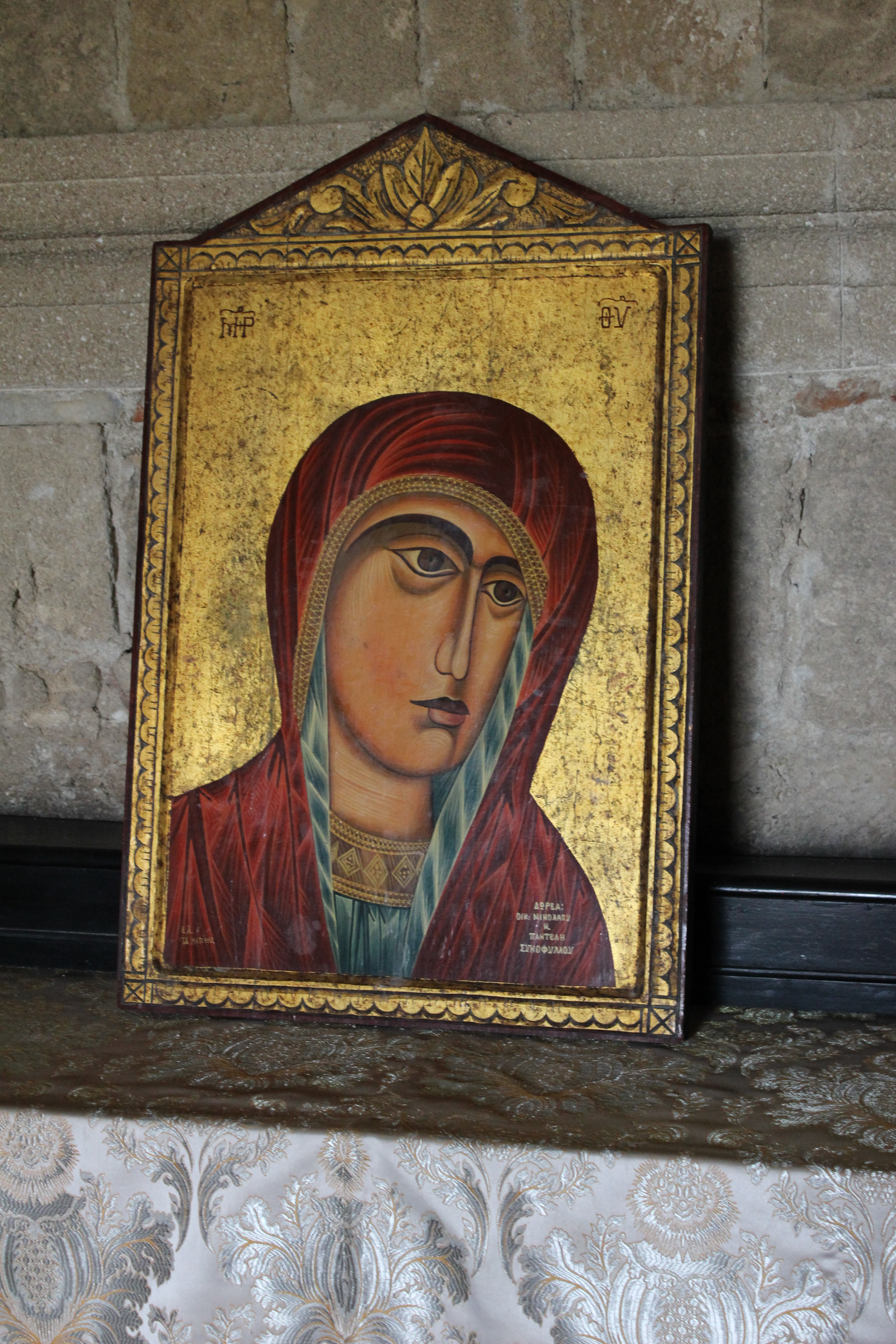
Replica of the Icon of Our Lady of Philermos, as displayed at the Philermos monastery in Rhodes.

When the Order was given possession of Malta in 1530, the icon was held at the Church of St. Lawrence in their headquarters in Vittoriosa. When the Order moved its base to the newly built capital city of Valletta in the 1570s, the icon was housed at a purpose-built side chapel of St John's Co-Cathedral. The icon remained there until the French invasion of Malta in 1798 which expelled the Order from the Maltese Islands. The French allowed the Order to take some relics with them, but not their precious reliquaries. The icon together with a fragment of the True Cross and of the hand of John the Baptist were passed by admiral Giulio Renato Litta to Paul I of Russia, who succeeded Ferdinand von Hompesch zu Bolheim as Grand Master. Paul placed them in the Priory Palace at Gatchina, near St. Petersburg.

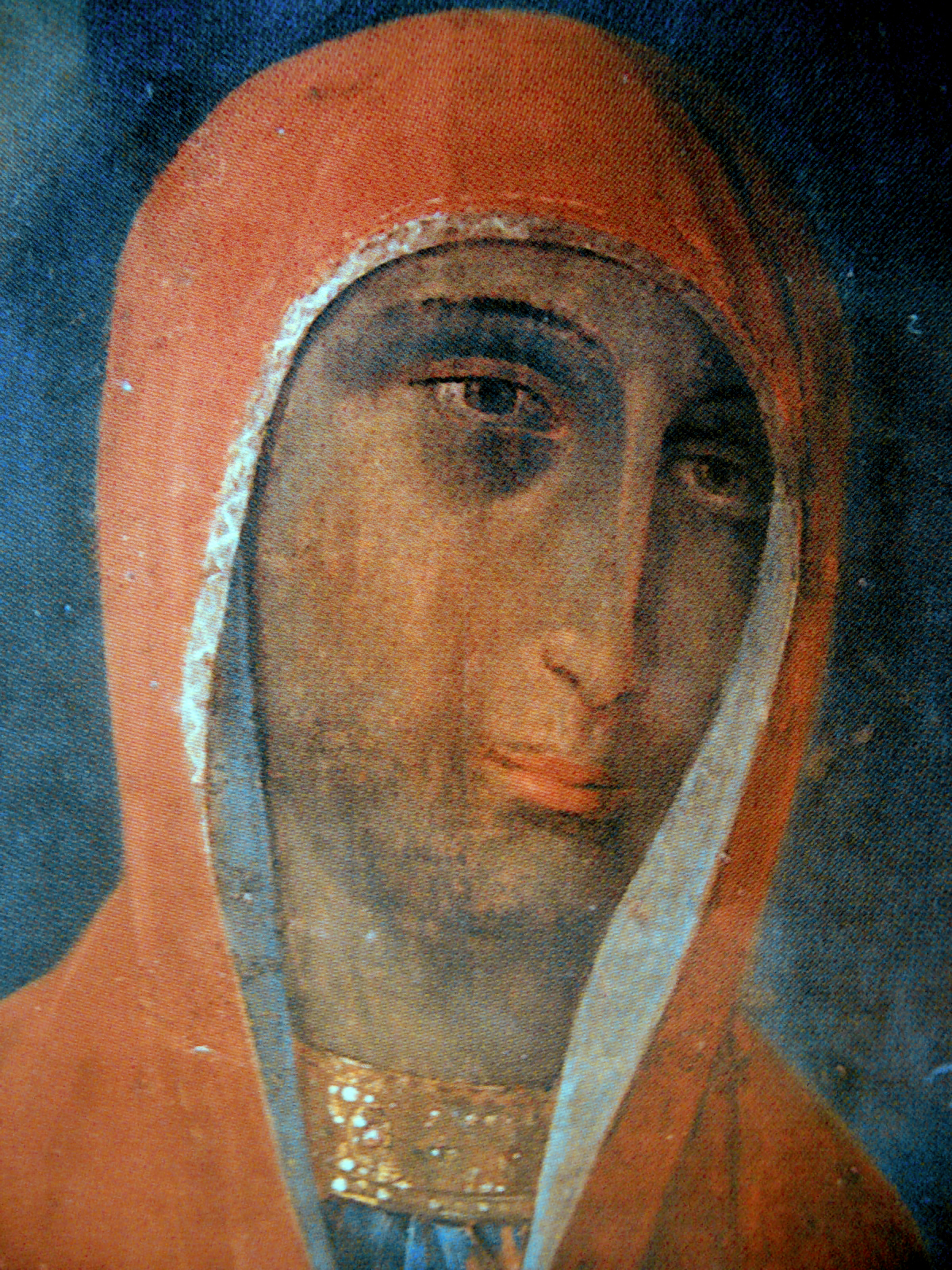
19th-century copy kept in Assisi.

In Russia, the icon was again covered in a riza of gold and precious stones. The riza includes a horseshoe-shaped diadem with rubies and diamonds, two necklaces of sapphire and diamond, and a halo in the form of the Maltese cross, the eight points shown as protruding from behind the head of the Virgin. Tsar Nicholas I ordered a copy to be made, to be carried in processions due to the fragile state of the original. This copy is now kept in the Papal Basilica of Saint Mary of the Angels in Assisi.

The relics survived the October Revolution, and were brought out of Soviet Russia by Maria Feodorovna in 1920, via Copenhagen. Her daughters gave it to Archbishop Anthony, president of the synod of the Russian Orthodox Church in exile. They were transferred to Belgrade in 1932 and placed under the protection of Alexander I of Yugoslavia, kept in the chapel of St Andrew in the royal palace at Dedinje until 1941. It appears that under the threat of Nazi invasion, they were moved to Ostrog Monastery in Montenegro. In 1951, a detachment of Yugoslav special forces captured the relics, and they were secretly placed in the vault of the museum at Cetinje. Their presence there was publicly revealed only in 1993, on the occasion of the visit of Russian patriarch Alexis II of Moscow.

There exists a well-known 1930s interpretation of the icon from the studio of Austrian artist Egon Huber (1905-1960), designer-director for ICARO RODI (Rhodes, Dodecanese, Greece), now in the ‘Street of Knights’, Old Town, Rhodes. The work comprises four unique, hand-painted, glazed tiles, illustrating perfectly Huber’s use of colour and distinctive, sinuous and imaginative style.

In December 2024, Malta's House of Representatives Speaker Anġlu Farrugia was presented with a replica of Our Lady of Philermos by the president of the Montenegrin parliament, Andrija Mandićj, acknowledging Malta's historical connection with this icon.
