= Lucy Clifford =

English novelist and journalist

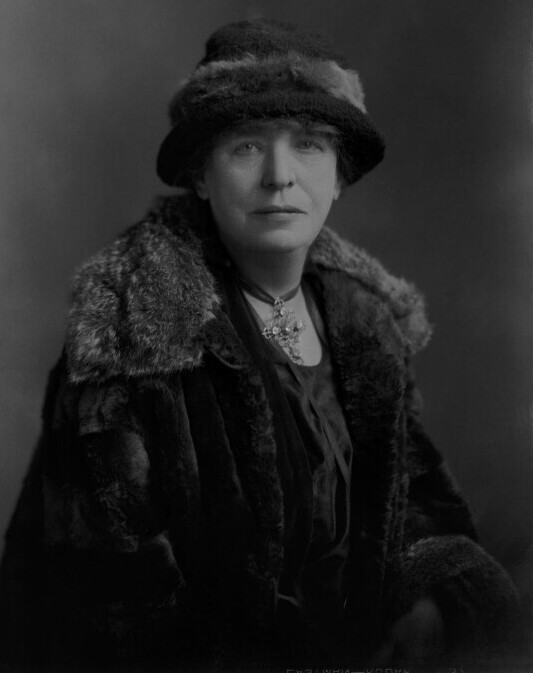
- Born: 2 August 1846; London
- Died: 21 April 1929 (aged 82)
- Occupation: Writer

Lucy Clifford (2 August 1846 – 21 April 1929), better known as Mrs. W. K. Clifford, was an English novelist, playwright and journalist.

== Biography ==
Lucy Clifford was born Lucy Lane in London, the daughter of John Lane of Barbados. She married the mathematician and philosopher William Kingdon Clifford in 1875.

After his death in 1879, she earned a prominent place in English literary life as a novelist, and later as a dramatist. Her best-known story, Mrs. Keith's Crime (1885), centres on euthanasia. It was followed by several other volumes, such as Aunt Anne (1892). She also wrote The Last Touches and Other Stories (1892) and Mere Stories (1896), and several plays between 1898 and 1925. She is perhaps most often remembered as the author of The Anyhow Stories, Moral and Otherwise (1882), a collection of stories she had written for her own children. The best known of these stories is "The New Mother".

Lucy Clifford also wrote cinematic adaptations of her short stories and plays. At least two films were produced from these: The Likeness of the Night (1922), directed by Percy Nash, and Eve's Lover (1925), directed by Roy Del Ruth.

Her wide circle of literary friends included Henry James. She had two children. Her daughter Ethel Clifford (died 1959), later Lady Dilke as the wife of Sir Fisher Wentworth Dilke, 4th Baronet (1877–1944), was a published poet.

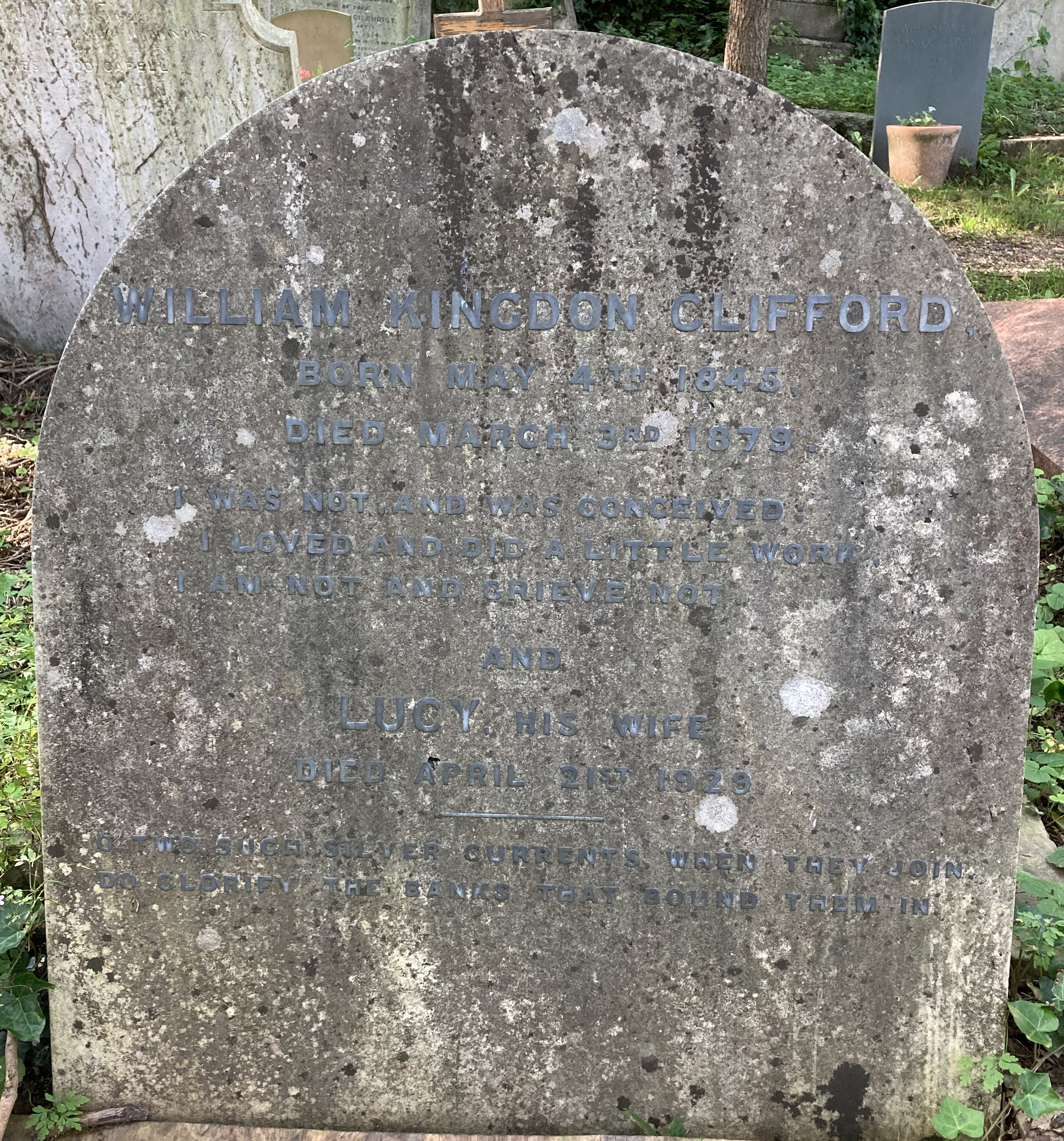
Grave of Lucy and William Clifford in Highgate Cemetery

Lucy Clifford died in 1929, and was buried alongside her husband on the eastern side of Highgate Cemetery, London.

In 2004, Gowan Dawson described Lucy's efforts to uphold the reputation of Clifford after his death:

Clifford's disconsolate widow and two young daughters had been left totally unprovided for, and, notwithstanding a subsequent Testimonial Fund and Civil List pension, it was necessary for Lucy Clifford, who now owned the copyright of her late husband's works, to maximise the potential sales of his posthumous publications, not only by keeping Clifford in the public eye, but by ensuring that it was a generally positive (and thus marketable) portrayal of him that was presented.

== Selected writings ==
- Clifford, Lucy (1885). Mrs. Keith's Crime. London: Richard Bentley & Son. "lucy clifford."
- Clifford, Lucy (1882). The Anyhow Stories, Moral and Otherwise. London: Macmillan & Company. "lucy clifford."
- Clifford, Lucy (1892). Aunt Anne. New York: Harper & Brothers. "w k clifford."
- Clifford, Lucy (1892). Love Letters of a Worldly Woman. Philadelphia: Harper & Brothers. "lucy clifford."
- Clifford, Lucy (1892). The Last Touches and Other Stories. /. Archived from the original on 22 October 2009.
- Clifford, Lucy (1896). A Flash of Summer: The Story of a Simple Woman's Life. New York: D. Appleton and Company. "w k clifford."
- Clifford, Lucy (1896). Mere Stories. London: A. and C. Black. Archived from the original on 22 October 2009.
- Clifford, Lucy (1897). The Dominant Note and Other Stories. New York: Dodd, Meade and Company.
- Clifford, Lucy (1902). A Long Duel: A Serious Comedy. London and New York: John Lane. "lucy clifford."
- Clifford, Lucy (1902). Woodside Farm. London: Duckworth and Company. "w k clifford."
- Clifford, Lucy (1904). The Getting Well of Dorothy. London: Methuen and Company.
- Clifford, Lucy (1910). Plays. New York: Mitchell Kennerley. "lucy clifford."
- Clifford, Lucy (1915). A Woman Alone. New York: Charles Scribner's Sons. Archived from the original on 22 October 2009.
- Clifford, Lucy (1919). Miss Fingal. New York: Charles Scribner's Sons. "w k clifford."
