= In a Dark, Dark Room and Other Scary Stories =

1984 collection of horror stories by Alvin Schwartz

- Cover
- Author: Alvin Schwartz
- Illustrator: Dirk Zimmer
- Country: United States
- Language: English
- Published: August 2, 1984

In a Dark, Dark Room and Other Scary Stories is a collection of horror stories, poems and urban legends retold for children by Alvin Schwartz and illustrator Dirk Zimmer. It was published as part of the I Can Read! series in 1984. In 2017, the book was re-released with illustrations by Spanish freelance illustrator Victor Rivas. The book contains seven works: "The Teeth", "In the Graveyard", "The Green Ribbon", "In a Dark, Dark Room", "The Night it Rained", "The Pirate" and "The Ghost of John".

== Contents ==
=== "The Teeth" ===
A boy is hurrying home and comes upon a man. The boy asks the man for the time, and when he replies, the boy sees he has long teeth, scaring him away. He runs and comes upon another man, who asks him why he is running before revealing that he has even longer teeth. The boy once again runs away, encountering a third man with yet longer teeth, and finally runs all the way home.

=== "In the Graveyard" ===
A "very short and very fat" woman asks three corpses in a graveyard if she will be thin like them when she is dead. She is surprised when the corpses spring to life to respond in the affirmative. She screams, and in her panic she forgets her things and runs.

=== "The Green Ribbon" ===
"The Green Ribbon" follows a girl named Jenny. Jenny always wore a green ribbon around her neck. When she was young, she met a boy named Alfred, and they were quick to fall in love with each other. Alfred asks continuously about the ribbon on her neck, but Jenny only says that she will tell him once the time is right. Time goes by, and when they are newly wed, Alfred asks what the green ribbon is again, and Jenny only says that she will tell him once the time comes. After that, years pass, and they grow of old age together. One day, Jenny gets incredibly sick. The doctor tells her that she is dying. On her deathbed, Jenny decides it is finally the right time to tell Alfred about the ribbon. She tells Alfred to untie it. Slowly, he does, and Jenny dies as her head falls off.

=== "In a Dark, Dark Room" ===
This story is presented as a series of "dark, dark" places and objects which narrow in scope from a woods to a house within the woods to a room within the house to a chest within the room to a shelf in the chest to a box on the shelf. A ghost emerges from the box.

=== "The Night it Rained" ===
A man drives by the cemetery and finds a boy named Jim, standing by himself in the rain. The man offers Jim a ride and gives him his sweater to stay warm. After bringing Jim home, the man told him to keep his sweater till the next day. The man stopped by Jim's house to retrieve his sweater. Jim's mother was confused and told the man that her son, Jim, died, and was buried in the cemetery. The man goes to the cemetery to see Jim's grave. Lying across the grave is his sweater.

=== "The Pirate" ===
A girl named Ruth goes to visit her relatives and is playing with her cousin Susan. Susan tells her a pirate once lived in and currently haunts the room Ruth is staying in. Ruth boldly claims that she does not believe in ghosts and that she is not afraid. She goes to bed that night and checks everywhere, finding nothing. When she gets to bed, she laughs and says "There's no one in this room but me", and a scary voice from nowhere says "AND ME!".

=== "The Ghost of John" ===
A limerick-style poem about a skeleton. Also used in choirs as warm-ups.

== Reception ==
Kirkus Reviews praised the author stating that "[t]he pacing makes at once for comfortable and dramatic reading; the pictures are a ghastly, gloomy, wickedly funny lot."
