= Legend of the Mistletoe Bough =

English folklore and urban legend

The Legend of the Mistletoe Bough is a horror story which has been associated with many mansions and stately homes in England.

A new bride, playing a game of hide-and-seek or trying to get away from the crowd during her wedding breakfast, hides in a chest in an attic and is unable to escape. She is not discovered by her family and friends and dies trapped in the chest. The bride's skeleton, still in her wedding dress, is found in the chest decades later.

Notable claimants for the story's location, some still displaying the chest, include Bramshill House and Marwell Hall in Hampshire, Castle Horneck in Cornwall, Basildon Park Grotto in Berkshire, Minster Lovell Hall in Oxfordshire, Exton Hall in Rutland, Brockdish Hall in Norfolk and Bawdrip Rectory in Somerset.

== History ==
The tale first appeared in print in the form of a poem by Samuel Rogers entitled "Ginevra", in his book Italy published in 1822. In notes on this work, Rogers states 'The story is, I believe, founded on fact; though the time and the place are uncertain. Many old houses lay claim to it.'

The popularity of the tale was greatly increased when it appeared as a song in the 1830s entitled 'The Mistletoe Bough' written by T. H. Bayly and Sir Henry Bishop. The song proved very popular. In 1859, its 'solemn chanting' was referred to as a 'national occurrence at Christmas' in English households, and by 1862 the song was referred to as 'one of the most popular songs ever written', 'which must be known by heart by many readers'.

Further works inspired by the song include a play of the same name by Charles A. Somerset, first produced in 1835, and two short stories: Henry James's "The Romance of Certain Old Clothes" (published 1868) and Susan Wallace's "Ginevra or The Old Oak Chest: A Christmas Story" (published 1887). The song is also played in Thomas Hardy's A Laodicean, after the scene involving the capture of George Somerset's handkerchief from the tower.

Kate Mosse reinterpreted the story in her 2013 short-story collection The Mistletoe Bride and Other Haunting Tales.

Film versions of the story include a 1904 production by the Clarendon Film Company, directed by Percy Stow; a 1923 version made by the British and Colonial Kinematograph Company; and a 1926 production by Cosmopolitan Films, directed by C.C. Calvert. The Percy Stow film version of the story can be seen on the BFI player with a new specially commissioned score by Pete Wiggs from the band Saint Etienne.

The story of the Mistletoe Bough is recounted in the 1948 Alfred Hitchcock film Rope, where it is said to be the favourite tale of the main character, Brandon Shaw. Unbeknownst to the story teller, Shaw has previously murdered his friend, former classmate David Kentley, and hidden the body in the chest in front of which they are standing.

The story is also recounted in The Hand in the Trap, a 1961 Argentine film directed by Leopoldo Torre Nilsson. In a conversation between the characters Laura Lavigne (Elsa Daniel) and Cristóbal Achával (Francisco Rabal), Cristóbal refers to the story as Modena's Bride. He tells the tale of a woman who, on her wedding night, played hide and seek with her husband and hid inside a chest. No-one could find her. Twenty years later, her skeleton was found wrapped in tulle.
