= Alvin Schwartz (children's author) =

American author (1927–1992)

- Born: April 25, 1927; Brooklyn, New York City, U.S.
- Died: March 14, 1992 (aged 64); Princeton, New Jersey, U.S.
- Education: Colby College; Northwestern University
- Occupations: Author; journalist
- Writing career
- Genres: Children's literature; horror; folklore

Alvin Schwartz (April 25, 1927 – March 14, 1992) was an American author and journalist who wrote more than fifty books dedicated to and dealing with topics such as folklore and word play, many of which were intended for young readers.

== Life and career ==
Schwartz was born the son of Gussie and Harry Schwartz, a taxi driver. After a stint in the Navy, Schwartz became interested in writing. He received his bachelor's degree from Colby College and a master's degree in journalism from Northwestern University. He reported for The Binghamton Press from 1951 to 1955. During his professional writing career his work had been published by a variety of firms, including Lippincott, Bantam Books, Farrar Straus, and HarperCollins.

A series of his books on folklore for children were illustrated by Glen Rounds and each featured a type of folklore: the first, A Twister of Twists, a Tangler of Tongues, was published in 1972. Others in this series included Tomfoolery, which featured wordplay; Witcracks which was about smart-aleck riddles and jokes; and Cross Your Fingers, Spit in Your Hat, about superstitions.

He is best known for the Scary Stories to Tell in the Dark series, a series best recognized for its gruesome, nightmarish illustrations by Stephen Gammell. The series was America's most frequently challenged book series for library inclusion during the 1980s and 1990s.

Some of his other books, such as When I Grew Up Long Ago, were aimed at an older audience, and presented glimpses of life in the United States during the late 19th century and the early 20th century.

Schwartz died of lymphoma in Princeton, New Jersey, on March 14, 1992, at age 64. Schwartz was survived by his wife and four children.

== The Scary Stories series ==
- Scary Stories to Tell in the Dark (1981)
- More Scary Stories to Tell in the Dark (1984)
- Scary Stories 3 : More Tales to Chill Your Bones (1991)

== Other books ==
- A Twister of Twists, A Tangler of Tongues (1972)
- Witcracks: Jokes and Jests from American Folklore (1973)
- Cross Your Fingers, Spit in Your Hat: Superstitions and Other Beliefs (1974)
- Whoppers: Tall Tales and Other Lies Collected from American Folklore (1975)
- Tomfoolery: Trickery and Foolery With Words (1975)
- Kickle Sniffers and Other Fearsome Critters (1976)
- When I Grew Up Long Ago (1978)
- Chin Music: Tall Talk and Other Talk (1979)
- Ten Copycats in a Boat and Other Riddles (1980)
- Flapdoodle: Pure Nonsense from American Folklore (1980)
- There Is a Carrot in My Ear and Other Noodle Tales (1982)
- Busy Buzzing Bumblebees and Other Tongue Twisters (1982)
- Unriddling: All Sorts of Riddles to Puzzle Your Guessary (1983)
- In a Dark, Dark Room and Other Scary Stories (1984)
- Fat Man in a Fur Coat: And Other Bear Stories (1984)
- Cat's Elbow and Other Secret Languages (1985)
- All of Our Noses Are Here and Other Noodle Tales (1985)
- Tales of Trickery from the Land of Spoof (1985)
- Telling Fortunes: Love Magic, Dream Signs, and Other Ways to Learn the Future (1987)
- Gold and Silver, Silver and Gold: Tales of Hidden Treasure (1988)
- I Saw You in the Bathtub and Other Folk Rhymes (1989)
- Ghosts!: Ghostly Tales from Folklore (1991)
- Stories to Tell a Cat (1992)
- And the Green Grass Grew All Around: Folk Poetry from Everyone (1992)

== Compilations ==
- Scary Stories to Read When It's Dark (Reading Rainbow Readers series)
