= Urban Legend (film series) =

Slasher media franchise

- Created by: Silvio Horta
- Original work: Urban Legend (1998)
- Owner: Sony Pictures Entertainment
- Years: 1998–present

Films and television
- Films: Urban Legend (1998); Urban Legends: Final Cut (2000)
- Direct-to-video: Urban Legends: Bloody Mary (2005)

Urban Legend is an American slasher media franchise owned by Sony Pictures Entertainment, and consisting of three slasher films. The first installment was written by Silvio Horta, directed by Jamie Blanks, and released in 1998.

== Films ==
Film	U.S. release date	Director(s)	Screenwriter(s)	Producer(s)
Urban Legend	September 25, 1998	Jamie Blanks	Silvio Horta	Gina Matthews, Neal H. Moritz & Michael McDonnell
Urban Legends: Final Cut	September 22, 2000	John Ottman	Scott Derrickson & Paul Harris Boardman	Gina Matthews, Neal H. Moritz & Richard Luke Rothschild
Urban Legends: Bloody Mary	July 19, 2005	Mary Lambert	Dan Harris & Michael Dougherty	Scott Messer, Aaron Merrell & Louis Phillips

=== Urban Legend (1998) ===
A college student suspects a series of bizarre deaths are connected to certain urban legends.

=== Urban Legends: Final Cut (2000) ===
A film school is the center of a fresh spate of killings based on urban legends.

=== Urban Legends: Bloody Mary (2005) ===
On a prom-night dare, a trio of high school friends chant an incantation, unleashing an evil spirit from the past with deadly consequences.

=== Future ===
Ghosts of Goldfield was originally intended to be the fourth entry in the franchise, but the title was dropped due to licensing issues.

In February 2020, a reboot of the film was announced to be in development, to be written and directed by Colin Minihan. In August, Sydney Chandler, Katherine McNamara and Keith Powers were cast in the film. In October 2022, Minihan revealed that the film had been cancelled due to "bad timing". In the following months, Eli Roth confirmed that it was due to the studio losing interest, and McNamara reported that it was due to the COVID-19 pandemic.

In April 2025, it was announced that a new reboot was in development by Screen Gems, with Shanrah Wakefield writing the script. Gary Dauberman and Neal H. Moritz are set to produce, with the story aiming to be "an examination of what an urban legend looks like in a post-digital world."

== Cast and crew ==
Key
- A ^{V} indicates the actor or actress lent only his or her voice for his or her film character.
- A ^{U} indicates an uncredited appearance.
- A ^{Y} indicates the actor portrayed the role of a younger version of the character.
- A ^{C} indicates a cameo appearance.
- A dark gray cell indicates the character was not in the film.

=== Principal cast ===
Characters	Films		
Characters	Urban Legend	Urban Legends: Final Cut	Urban Legends: Bloody Mary
Characters	1998	2000	2005
Officer Reese Wilson	Loretta Devine	Loretta Devine	
Brenda Bates	Rebecca Gayheart	Rebecca Gayheart^{U}^{C}	Mentioned
Paul Gardner	Jared Leto		
Natalie "Nash" Simon	Alicia Witt		
Sasha Thomas	Tara Reid		
Parker Riley	Michael Rosenbaum		
Damon Brooks	Joshua Jackson		
Dean Adams	John Neville		
Professor William Wexler	Robert Englund		
Amy Mayfield		Jennifer Morrison	
Travis Stark Trevor Stark		Matthew Davis	
Graham Manning		Joseph Lawrence	
Vanessa Valdeon		Eva Mendes	
Sandra Petruzzi		Jessica Cauffiel	
Toby Belcher		Anson Mount	
Stan Washington		Anthony Anderson	
Professor Solomon		Hart Bochner	Mentioned
Samantha "Sam" Owens			Kate Mara
David Owens			Robert Vito
Grace Taylor			Tina Lifford Charlene Baptista^{Y}
Bill "Willy" Owens			Ed Marinaro Daniel B. Culmer^{Y}
Mary Banner			Lillith Fields
Buck Jacoby			Michael Gregory Coe
Pamela "Pam" Owens			Nancy Everhard

=== Additional crew ===
Crew/Detail	Film		
Crew/Detail	Urban Legend	Urban Legends: Final Cut	Urban Legends: Bloody Mary
Crew/Detail	1998	2000	2005
Composer(s)	Christopher Young	John Ottman	Jeff Rona
Cinematographer	James Chressanthis	Brian Pearson	Ian Fox
Editor	Jay Cassidy	Rob Kobrin; John Ottman	Michelle Harrison
Production companies	Original Film; Phoenix Pictures; TriStar Pictures (US); Columbia Pictures (UK)	Original Film; Phoenix Pictures; Columbia Pictures	NPP Productions
Distributing company	Sony Pictures Releasing	Sony Pictures Releasing	Sony Pictures Home Entertainment
Running time	100 minutes	98 minutes	93 minutes

== Reception ==
=== Box office performance ===
Film	U.S. release date	Box office gross			Budget	Ref(s)
Film	U.S. release date	U.S. and Canada	Other territories	Worldwide	Budget	Ref(s)
Urban Legend	September 25, 1998	$38,072,438	$34,455,157	$72,527,595	$14 million	
Urban Legends: Final Cut	September 22, 2000	$21,468,807	$17,105,555	$38,574,362	$14 million	
Total		$59,541,245	$51,560,712	$111,101,957	$28,000,000	

=== Critical and public response ===
Film	Rotten Tomatoes	Metacritic	CinemaScore
Urban Legend	30% (66 reviews)	35 (15 reviews)	C
Urban Legends: Final Cut	12% (86 reviews)	16 (25 reviews)	D+
Urban Legends: Bloody Mary	40% (5 reviews)		

== Music ==
Title	U.S. release date	Length	Performed by	Label
Urban Legend: Music from the Motion Picture Soundtrack	September 29, 1998	35:48	Various Artists	Milan
Urban Legends: Final Cut (Original Motion Picture Soundtrack)	September 12, 2000	01:13:12	John Ottman	Varèse Sarabande
