= X-Men (soundtrack) =

X-Men: Original Motion Picture Soundtrack

Soundtrack album by Michael Kamen
- Released: July 11, 2000
- Genre: Film score
- Length: 40:27
- Label: Decca
- Producer: Michael Kamen

Michael Kamen chronology
Frequency (2000)	X-Men (2000)	Band of Brothers (2001)

X-Men: Original Motion Picture Soundtrack is the soundtrack to the 2000 film X-Men featuring the original score written and composed by Michael Kamen. It was released by Decca Records on July 11, 2000 featuring 12 tracks. An expanded edition containing the full score and unused cues processed during the composition and alternate themes, released by La-La Land Records under the "limited edition" of 3,000 units on May 11, 2021.

== Background ==
For the film's score, Singer approached John Williams to compose music, but turned down the offer as his schedule conflicted with that of Star Wars: Episode II – Attack of the Clones (2002). Singer then set on his usual composer, John Ottman. However, once Fox pushed X-Men from December to July, Ottman's commitment to direct Urban Legends: Final Cut made him unable to work with Singer. In February 2000, Michael Kamen was eventually hired to compose the film's score instead. He had previously collaborated with Fox to produce his scores for various film projects, including the Die Hard film trilogy. X-Men was the first film directed by Singer to have a different composer for its score instead of Ottman.

As Kamen was not familiar with the comics, he only tried to "represent Bryan Singer's filmic tone that he's made, for a comic book, a quite serious movie, which is about the capacity of humanity to categorize people by race, religion or type, and prejudice people against them based on their innate characteristics". Character-specific themes were written to "identify these characters, as you go through the film, because they're not always clear". For instance, Mystique's motif, focused on the cello as Kamen found it "a very erotic-sounding instrument", played in the soundtrack as she was disguised as Wolverine. He initially planned to record the score first in London, but due to time restrictions, the recording was held in Los Angeles instead.

Kamen's first draft of the score had been described as having an abundance of themes and rich orchestrations. During early recording sessions, producer Lauren Shuler Donner expressed her dissatisfaction with Kamen's music and forced him to rewrite the entire score by using fewer themes and more electronic elements.

== Track listing ==
=== Standard ===
No.	Title	Length
1.	"Death Camp"	3:04
2.	"Ambush"	3:27
3.	"Mutant School"	3:47
4.	"Magneto's Lair"	5:00
5.	"Cerebro"	2:12
6.	"Train"	2:39
7.	"Magneto Stand Off"	2:58
8.	"The X-Jet"	3:49
9.	"Museum Fight"	2:22
10.	"The Statue of Liberty"	2:38
11.	"Final Showdown"	2:30
12.	"Logan and Rogue"	6:01
Total length:		40:27

=== Expanded edition ===
Disc 1
No.	Title	Length
1.	"Death Camp" (Film Version)	3:07
2.	"Rogue's Kiss"	1:51
3.	"Senate Discussion"	2:25
4.	"Bar Fight"	1:34
5.	"Logan Drives"	1:05
6.	"Ambush"	3:27
7.	"They Knew / Laboratory"	3:57
8.	"School Montage"	3:15
9.	"Helicopter Hijack"	1:00
10.	"Kelly's Transformation"	3:23
11.	"Jean Reads Logan's Mind / Nightmare / Rogue Heals Logan"	3:24
12.	"Kelly In Prison / Beach"	2:48
13.	"Bobby And Rogue"	1:09
14.	"Cerebro"	2:11
15.	"Logan And Rogue In Train"	3:53
16.	"Train"	2:37
17.	"Magneto Stand Off"	3:01
18.	"Xavier Reads Kelly's Mind"	2:10
19.	"Kelly Dies"	1:36
20.	"Xavier Falls"	1:23
21.	"Jean Uses Cerebro"	1:34
22.	"Land Of Tolerance"	2:01
23.	"The X-Jet"	3:48
24.	"Over The Wall"	0:33
25.	"Museum Fight" (Film Version)	3:19
26.	"Museum Fight" (Continued)	1:39
27.	"Logan Kills Mystique"	0:59
28.	"Fight On The Head"	2:40
29.	"Final Showdown" (Film Mix)	2:30
30.	"Logan Holds Rogue"	2:45
31.	"Jean And Logan"	1:57
32.	"Logan Says Goodbye / Why Ask Questions / Finale"	3:43
Total length:		76:44

Disc 2
No.	Title	Length
1.	"Death Camp"	3:04
2.	"Mutant School"	3:48
3.	"Magneto's Lair"	4:59
4.	"Museum Fight"	2:23
5.	"The Statue Of Liberty"	2:39
6.	"Final Showdown"	2:30
7.	"Logan And Rogue"	6:01
8.	"X-Men Main Title" (Film Construct)	0:55
9.	"Senate Discussion" (Revised)	2:32
10.	"Wolverine In The Ring" (Film Construct)	0:28
11.	"Logan Drives" (Film Edit)	0:36
12.	"Ambush" (Part 1) (Full Take)	0:58
13.	"Ambush" (Film Edit)	2:17
14.	"Helicopter Hijack" (Alternate)	1:01
15.	"Helicopter Hijack" (Film Version)	1:10
16.	"Cerebro" (Film Mix)	2:04
17.	"Train" (Film Version)	2:34
18.	"Magneto Stand Off" (Film Mix)	2:54
19.	"Kelly Dies" (Film Version)	1:06
20.	"Xavier Falls" (Film Version)	1:01
21.	"Jean Uses Cerebro" (Film Version)	1:24
22.	"Land Of Tolerance" (Film Version)	1:53
23.	"The X-Jet" (Film Version)	2:04
24.	"Museum Fight" (Part 1) (Alternate)	2:02
25.	"Inside The Statue / Logan Escapes" (Film Construct)	3:48
26.	"Fight On The Head" (Film Version)	2:28
27.	"Logan Holds Rogue" (Film Version)	2:29
28.	"Jean And Logan" (Alternate)	1:58
29.	"Why Ask Questions / Finale / End Credits" (Film Construct)	11:11
Total length:		74:17

== Reception ==
James Southall of Movie Wave commented "Exploring the score reveals it has surprising depth – including a surprising thematic depth, with Kamen taking an unheralded leitmotivic approach to the score – motifs, sometimes just tiny little fragments, are heard throughout the album in different guises." Steven McDonald of AllMusic wrote " the score would have benefited from the absence of most of the electronic elements, which serve only to jar the viewer/listener out of the moment". Filmtracks.com critiqued the score saying "the score requires patience and an acceptance of Kamen's extremely dark treatment of the concept" while the sequels (X2 and The Last Stand) scored by John Ottman and John Powell were "superior efforts that provide the concept with better themes and far more engaging action material".
