= Urban Legend (film) =

1998 film directed by Jamie Blanks

- Theatrical release poster
- Directed by: Jamie Blanks
- Written by: Silvio Horta
- Produced by: Gina Matthews; Michael McDonnell; Neal H. Moritz
- Starring: Jared Leto; Alicia Witt; Rebecca Gayheart; Joshua Jackson; Loretta Devine; Tara Reid; Michael Rosenbaum; Robert Englund
- Cinematography: James Chressanthis
- Edited by: Jay Cassidy
- Music by: Christopher Young
- Production companies: Original Film; Phoenix Pictures
- Distributed by: TriStar Pictures (though Sony Pictures Releasing)
- Release date: September 25, 1998
- Running time: 100 minutes
- Countries: United States; Canada; France
- Language: English
- Budget: $14 million
- Box office: $72.5 million

Urban Legend is a 1998 slasher film directed by Jamie Blanks, written by Silvio Horta, and starring Jared Leto, Alicia Witt, Rebecca Gayheart, Tara Reid, and Michael Rosenbaum, and is the first installment in the Urban Legend film series. Its plot focuses on a series of murders on the campus of a private New England university, all of which appear to be modeled after popular urban legends. In addition to its core cast, the film features supporting performances from Robert Englund, Joshua Jackson, Danielle Harris, Loretta Devine, John Neville, Natasha Gregson Wagner, and Brad Dourif. It is an international co-production between the United States, Canada and France.

Filmed in Toronto in the spring of 1998, Urban Legend was theatrically released in the United States on September 25, 1998, by TriStar Pictures (through Sony Pictures Releasing). It was a commercial success, grossing $72.5 million worldwide on a budget of $14 million, but received generally negative reviews from critics, with chief criticisms being that the film was derivative of Scream (1996). The film has been credited by both cinema and folklore scholars as being one of the first major films to redistribute the urban legends and folklore depicted within it to the public. (Note: Writer Gail de Vos notes the film's influence in re-transmitting the legends it depicts intra-narratively.)

It was followed by two sequels: Urban Legends: Final Cut, which was released theatrically in 2000, and the direct-to-video film Urban Legends: Bloody Mary in 2005. A planned third sequel, Ghosts of Goldfield, was released as a standalone film in 2007. In February 2020, a reboot of the film was announced to be in development, but it was later canceled due to the COVID-19 pandemic and the studio losing interest. In April 2025, it was announced that the reboot has returned to development.

== Plot ==
Michelle Mancini is driving back to Pendleton University and stops at a rundown gas station, where she flees from a clerk who tries to keep her from leaving the store, unaware the clerk was trying to save her from a killer in the backseat of her car. She is decapitated with an axe by the hidden individual as she drives down the road. The next night, college radio show host Sasha Thomas advises other students on their sex lives. Across campus at the student coffee shop, Sasha's boyfriend Parker Riley regales friends Natalie Simon and Brenda Bates by describing a massacre in the abandoned Stanley Hall dormitory, which journalism student Paul Gardner dismisses as an urban legend.

The following day, news of Michelle's murder spreads but Dean Adams and campus police officer Reese Wilson seem determined to bury the story. Damon Brooks, a fraternity member, attempts to console the disturbed Natalie while at the same time taking an advantage of her vulnerability. She rejects his sexual advances in his parked car at a bluff. While Damon is urinating in the woods, an assailant in a hooded parka attacks him and hangs him from a tree. Natalie flees for help, but Damon's body and car have disappeared when she returns with Reese. Parker and Sasha assure Natalie that Damon has pranked her, the story mirroring an urban legend told often in their folklore class. Unconvinced, Natalie turns to the library to research urban legends to ease her mind. There, she runs into Sasha and they look through Natalie's urban legend encyclopedia together, finding one about driving with headlights turned off and pursuing the first driver who flashes them, a legend Sasha is convinced happens all the time.

Later, while Natalie sleeps, her goth promiscuous roommate Tosh Guarini is killed by strangulation. Next morning, Natalie finds Tosh's body along with a bloody message on the wall. Distraught that the authorities treat Tosh's death as a suicide, she and Paul begin to investigate the Stanley Hall Massacre, believing it may be linked to the current murders.

After being caught breaking into American folklore Professor William Wexler's office while investigating, Natalie confides to Brenda that her and Michelle were once best friends, until Michelle caused a fatal car accident after driving with their headlights turned off and pursuing the first driver who flashed them, using Natalie's car while she was a passenger. Meanwhile, Paul continues investigating local urban legends and discovers that the Stanley Hall massacre actually occurred, leaving William Wexler as the sole survivor.

That night, Dean Adams is murdered in the campus parking garage after the killer runs him over with his own car and is impaled on the tire shredders, and Reese later finds Wexler's office disorganized and covered in blood. Natalie, Brenda, Parker and Sasha attend a fraternity party coinciding with the massacre's 25th anniversary, during which Paul reveals to Natalie the truth about Stanley Hall and Wexler, and both are now convinced he's behind the murders. Natalie cries out of fear, which Paul consoles her with a kiss, and Brenda leaves the party in tears after interrupting them, having revealed to Natalie her crush on Paul earlier. A party-goer hits on Sasha by telling her about the song Love Rollercoaster containing a real woman's dying screams, but she is disgusted by his story and brushes him off.

Paul then tries to warn Parker about the danger and that they should end the party, but Parker wants to keep the party going and mocks Paul by accusing him of secretly being the killer to further his journalism career. Paul leaves the party, and Sasha also departs to host her talk show at the campus radio station. Parker then receives a mysterious phone call, where the killer reveals they have microwaved Parker's pet dog. The killer then incapacitates Parker in the bathroom and murders him by forcing pop rocks and bathroom chemicals down his throat. Shortly after, during Sasha's live broadcast, the killer murders her assistant, and then attacks Sasha, whose screams are heard live on air; the fraternity partygoers assume it is a prank referencing Love Rollercoaster and the massacre, but Natalie, fearing Sasha is in danger, rushes to the station. Sasha is pursued through the empty radio station, her attempts to escape continually thwarted by the axe-wielding killer. After a fall from a staircase, she ends up trapped in a third floor room where she sees Natalie run into the main lobby. Sasha cries out for help, but Natalie witnesses the killer enter the room and murder Sasha with an axe, her dying screams broadcast over the radio.

Natalie soon finds Paul and Brenda on campus, notifying them of Sasha's death. Paul, convinced of Wexler's complicity, escorts them away in his car. They stop at a gas station, and while Paul is inside, Natalie and Brenda find Wexler's mutilated body in the trunk. The two women flee through the woods back toward campus as Paul pursues them. They become separated, and Natalie flags down the university's janitor passing by in his truck. He picks her up, but the killer forces their car off the road, pursuing them in a separate vehicle. The crash kills the janitor, but Natalie leaves unscathed and flees on foot.

While passing Stanley Hall, Natalie hears Brenda's screams from inside. In the building, she finds her friend's corpses, along with an apparently dead Brenda outstretched on a bed; however, Brenda knocks Natalie unconscious moments later. When Natalie awakens, Brenda reveals herself as the killer, enacting revenge for her fiancé and high school sweetheart David Evans, who died in the accident caused by Natalie and Michelle. Brenda attempts to remove Natalie's kidney, but is thwarted when Reese arrives and holds her at gunpoint. Brenda manages to stab Reese with a switchblade, only wounding her while gaining her gun, and when Paul arrives, Reese shoots Brenda with her other gun, in which Natalie gains control of the gun and shoots Brenda, who falls out a window, before leaving with him to get help for Reese. As they drive away, the two discuss how this will later be an urban legend and all the facts will be misconstrued. Paul asks, "Well if this is an urban legend, where is the twist?" Brenda then appears in the back seat and attacks them with an axe. Paul crashes the car on a bridge, launching Brenda through the windshield and into the river below.

Later, a group of students at a different university have recounted the events of Brenda's killing spree, during which they say that her body was never discovered. Most of them disbelieve the tale, except for one young woman, revealed to be Brenda, who claims that the story was incorrectly told, and begins explaining "how the story really goes".

== Cast ==
- Jared Leto as Paul Gardner, a student journalist who wants to uncover the Urban Legend myths
- Alicia Witt as Natalie Simon, a former high school cheerleader.
- Rebecca Gayheart as Brenda Bates, Natalie's college friend.
- Tara Reid as Sasha Thomas, a radio talk show DJ and student at Pendleton
- Joshua Jackson as Damon Brooks, a classmate and prankster at Pendleton
- Loretta Devine as Reese Wilson, the Pendleton campus police officer
- Natasha Gregson Wagner as Michelle Mancini, Natalie's high school friend.
- Michael Rosenbaum as Parker Riley, a frat boy dating Sasha
- Danielle Harris as Tosh Guaneri, Natalie's goth roommate
- John Neville as Dean Adams, Dean of Pendleton
- Robert Englund as Professor William Wexler, professor of American Folklore.
- Brad Dourif as Michael McDonnell, the mentally unstable gas clerk.

== Urban legends depicted in the film ==
The film depicts various urban legends, some of which are featured as murder sequences and others that are merely referenced or discussed in passing.

=== Re-enacted ===
- Michelle is murdered by a killer in the backseat. This legend is also referenced by various people looking at the backseat or talking about it.
- Coverage of Michelle's murder in the university newspaper is covered up by the dean, referencing the "University cover-up of campus murder," and the subsequent fears of the students reference the "Hatchet man" legend, which has an unnamed killer targeting college campuses at random. The origins of the latter have been traced to serial killer Richard Speck.
- Brenda and Natalie attempt to invoke Bloody Mary at the entrance to Stanley Hall.
- Professor Wexler suggests eating Pop Rocks and drinking soda at the same time. The death of Little Mikey from this is mentioned by Brenda. The killer later re-enacts this legend on Parker, substituting soda with cleaning chemicals.
- Damon is hanging from a tree while Natalie is waiting in the car below.
- Gangs driving with their headlights turned off, pursuing the first driver to flash them and running him off the road, is mentioned by Sasha in the library. It is later revealed that Natalie and Michelle did this, killing a young man; it is subsequently re-enacted by the killer on Natalie and the janitor and finally revealed as central to the killer's motive.
- Natalie finds her roommate strangled to death in her bed with the note "Aren't you glad you didn't turn on the light?"
- The "ankle slasher under the car" legend is re-enacted on Dean Adams.
- A guest at the fraternity party claims to Sasha that the song "Love Rollercoaster" contains a real murder scream; meanwhile, Sasha later screams for her life on air during her radio broadcast.
- Parker finds the remains of his dog in the microwave, resembling the "Old Lady dries wet dog in microwave" legend.
- The killer attempts to re-enact the "kidney heist" on Natalie.

=== Referenced ===
- A caller to Sasha's radio show states that she replaced her roommate's birth control pills with baby aspirin.
- A caller to Sasha's radio show asks about having her stomach pumped after performing oral sex and ingesting semen.
- A couple suffering from penis captivus call in to Sasha's radio show.
- Professor Wexler discusses the babysitter and the man upstairs legend during his lecture, and Brenda claims it happened in her hometown.
- Parker suggests placing spider eggs in Bubble Yum as the killer's next move.

== Production ==
=== Development and writing ===
The concept for the film was developed by Silvio Horta, a recent film school graduate from New York University who was working at the perfume counter in a Nordstrom. Horta pitched the idea in late-1997 to Gina Mathews, a producer who was leading writers' workshops at the time. Mathews liked the story, and the two began further developing the concept before Horta drafted a screenplay. Producer Neal H. Moritz subsequently became involved, and agreed to co-produce with Mathews and Michael McDonnell. Horta and Mathews pitched the screenplay to numerous film studios, but none expressed interest in funding the project. In a last-ditch effort at getting the film made, Horta brought the screenplay to Phoenix Pictures, a then-new company who had only produced a small number of films. Mike Medavoy, an executive at Phoenix, was impressed by the concept, but Horta recalled that his screenplay "needed to be better," and re-writes began to take place in the late-fall of 1997.

In seeking a director, executive producer Brad Luff scouted potential filmmakers from Australia, and was impressed by then-26-year-old Jamie Blanks's short horror film, Silent Number, which he had made as his thesis film while attending film school in Melbourne. Blanks had initially wanted to direct producer Moritz's I Know What You Did Last Summer (1997), and went so far as directing a mock-trailer for the project, but Jim Gillespie had already been hired to direct it. Instead, Blanks was offered the screenplay to Urban Legend, and signed on as director in February 1998.

=== Pre-production ===
Jared Leto was cast in the role of Paul Gardner, the student journalist investigating the murders. Mathews recalled that he was cast based on a "dark" quality he possessed that was at odds with his conventional appeal, and because he was already an established actor, known for his role on the teen drama series My So-Called Life. Alicia Witt was cast as the female lead, Natalie, as the producers felt she was "against type" and also a strong actress, whose previous credits included David Lynch's Dune (1984) and the series Twin Peaks (1990). Witt said she was intrigued by the prospect of playing a survivor character who has to endure "extraordinary circumstance[s]."

Rebecca Gayheart auditioned for the role of Brenda, Natalie's friend who eventually unveils herself as the film's villain. Numerous actresses were interested in the role, and Gayheart recalled having to "go in and fight" for the part. She read for the role numerous times, and performed multiple screen tests before the producers settled on her for the part.

Of the supporting cast, Joshua Jackson was granted the role of Damon, the joking fraternity member. At the time, Jackson had earned recognition for his featured role on the series Dawson's Creek. Michael Rosenbaum was cast as Parker, a friend of Damon; Rosenbaum was just beginning his film career, and had recently had a small role in Midnight in the Garden of Good and Evil (1997). Originally, a different actor had been considered for the role of Parker, but Blanks ultimately wanted Rosenbaum for the part. For the role of Sasha, Parker's girlfriend and the campus radio host, Tara Reid was cast.

Robert Englund, already well known for his portrayal of Freddy Krueger in the Nightmare on Elm Street film series, appears as Wexler, a psychology professor. Englund agreed to the part after being impressed by the concept of the screenplay, and was also a fan of several of the other cast members. Loretta Devine was cast as Reese, the witty campus police officer. Devine identified with the role based on her past experience as a dormitory director at Brandeis University, which provided her insight into "some of the goofy and dumb stuff they do." Danielle Harris, who had previously starred as Jamie Lloyd in Halloween 4 (1988) and Halloween 5 (1989), originally auditioned for the lead role of Natalie, but was instead cast as Tosh, her temperamental roommate.

In the role of Michelle Mancini, the ill-fated student who is murdered in the opening scene, actress Natasha Gregson Wagner was cast. Wagner was drawn to the part as she felt it encompassed a "proper scene" that she could "sink [her] teeth into." Brad Dourif was given an uncredited cameo appearance as the gas station attendant who appears opposite Wagner in the opening sequence.

=== Filming ===
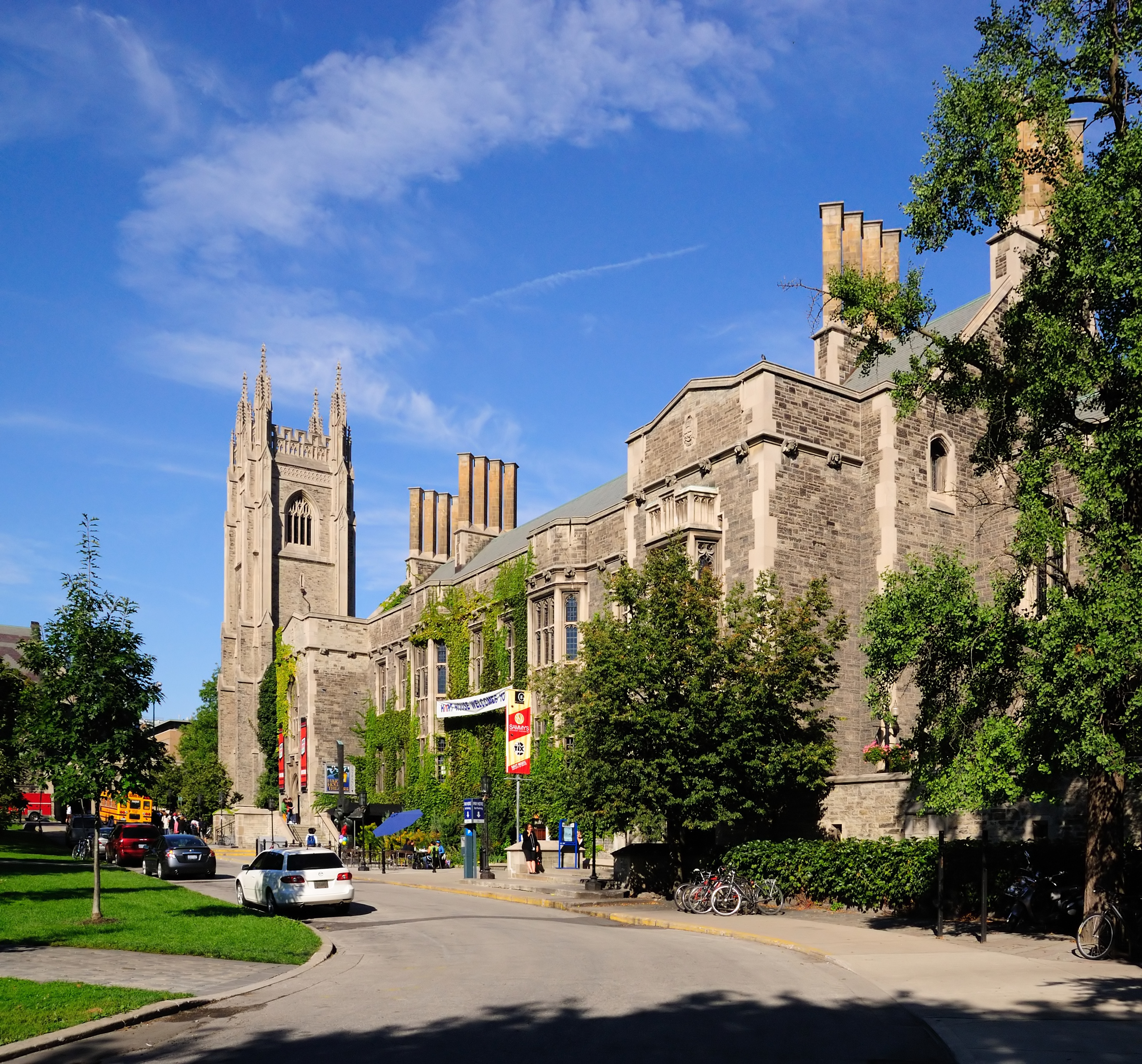
The University of Toronto served as the primary shooting location

Principal photography began in Toronto on April 20, 1998. The University of Toronto served as a stand-in for the fictional Pendleton University. The film's production design was completed by Charles William Breen, who had previously worked on such films as Blade Runner (1982).

The opening sequence was among the first to be filmed, as Blanks wanted to present a completed sequence to the producers early on to assure them of his directorial abilities. It was filmed on location at a gas station outside of Toronto; to achieve the effect of the storm, artificial rain machines were used. For the film's final sequence inside Stanley Hall, the screenplay called for a dilapidated locale. The production found a rundown building in Toronto that was scheduled to be demolished, and were granted permission to shoot there. As the sequence takes place entirely at night, the crew built a scaffolding out of pipe that was then draped in black tarping, giving the appearance of it being nighttime while inside the building. The interiors during this sequence were lit with candlelight, and cinematographer James Chressanthis drew inspiration from El Norte (1984), aspiring for a "ritual"-like appearance. Additionally, aerial images from Trinity College School in Port Hope, were used for Pendleton campus.

Throughout the shoot, Blanks sought to keep on-screen violence "muted" or implied rather than shown in explicit detail. Several moments of violence written in the script were not filmed, among them a shot of Wagner's character's severed head rolling onto the road after her death. The death sequences in the film, however, required significant technical planning, with Sid Armour providing makeup effects. Reid performed her own stunts during her character's chase sequence, including the fall over the staircase landing, during which she was secured by a harness. According to Reid, the stuntman who performed the scene used a real ax throughout the filming of it.

=== Post-production ===
Post-production of the film took place in Los Angeles over a period of less than two months, beginning in July 1998 and to be completed for the film's September 25 release. During the post-production process, producer McDonnell returned to Toronto to complete pick-ups. A rough cut was pre-screened for a test audience in Pasadena during post-production, and the audience response was favorable.

== Music ==
The film's score was composed by Christopher Young, who had previously scored several horror films, including The Dorm That Dripped Blood (1982) and Hellraiser (1987). Producer McDonnell had previously been in a band with Young in the 1970s in their home state of New Jersey. While Young admired the synthesizer scores of such films as Halloween (1978), Blanks insisted that he compose an orchestral score, which was more in alignment with Young's composing background.

There were two albums released from film, the original score by composer Christopher Young, and the original motion picture soundtrack.

Urban Legend: Music from the Motion Picture Soundtrack

Compilation album by Various
- Released: September 29, 1998
- Genre: Alternative rock
- Length: 35:48
- Label: Milan

No.	Title	Artist	Length
1.	"Tortured"	Annette Ducharme	4:43
2.	"Condition"	Ruth Ruth	3:41
3.	"The Only One"	Junkster	4:36
4.	"Trying Not to Think About It"	Juliana Hatfield	3:01
5.	"Love Rollercoaster"	Ohio Players	4:47
6.	"Urban Legend"	Christopher Young	5:00
7.	"Sex Advice with an Axe"	Christopher Young	10:00

Additional songs featured in the film:

- "Save Yourself" by Stabbing Westward
- "Zoot Suit Riot" by Cherry Poppin' Daddies
- "Total Eclipse of the Heart" by Bonnie Tyler
- "Comin' Back" by The Crystal Method
- "Spookshow Baby" by Rob Zombie
- "Crop Circle" by Monster Magnet
- "Love Rollercoaster" by Ohio Players
- "I Don't Want to Wait" by Paula Cole
- "The End of Sugarman" by Roy Ayers
- "I Know God" by David Ivy

== Release ==
Urban Legend premiered at the Fox Village Theatre in Westwood Village, Los Angeles, before being released theatrically in the United States on September 25, 1998.

=== Home media ===
Urban Legend was released on DVD by Columbia TriStar Home Video on February 23, 1999. The release contained an audio commentary with director Blanks, writer Horta, and actor Michael Rosenbaum, as well as a making-of-featurette. The film received a region-free Blu-ray release on July 22, 2008 by Sony. Scream Factory released a 2-disc collector's edition Blu-ray of the film on November 20, 2018. 88 Films subsequently released the film on Blu-ray in the United Kingdom in 2021 as part of a three-film trilogy set, which includes the sequels Urban Legends: Final Cut (2000) and Urban Legends: Bloody Mary (2005).

== Reception ==
=== Box office ===
The film earned $10.5 million in its opening weekend (nearly recouping its $14 million budget), showing at 2,257 theaters across the United States. It would go on to gross $38 million domestically, and earn an additional $34 million internationally for a worldwide total of $72.5 million.

=== Critical response ===
Urban Legend received largely unfavorable reviews from film critics at the time of its release. Many critics drew negative comparisons of the film to Wes Craven's Scream, released two years prior. (Note: Many critics compared Urban Legend negatively to Scream, deeming it a clone or imitation, while others, such as Anita Gates (who gave the film a positive review), merely noted the films' relation as late-1990s slasher films.) Among them were critic Betsy Sherman of The Boston Globe, who assessed the film as a "vapid Scream rip-off."

Anita Gates of The New York Times called the film a "teen-age moviegoer's dream", adding: "It has familiar young television stars, familiar older stars with cult followings (Robert Englund as the aforementioned professor, John Neville as the dean), an edgy sense of humor, a tricky plot and characters too genre-savvy for their own good. Maybe there will be an oversaturation of Scream-inspired horror films someday soon, but this one feels fresh." Bob Heisler of the Los Angeles Times called it an unoriginal "low-voltage drive-in movie, made strictly by-the-book." The New York Daily News gave the film a middling two-star out of five rating, noting that it "starts out with a unique concept but ends up as just another gorefest."

Roger Ebert of the Chicago Sun-Times awarded the film two out of four stars, but praised Christopher Young's musical score, and adding: "The film is competently made, and the attractive cast emotes and screams energetically, and does a good job of unwisely grabbing one another by the shoulders." Entertainment Weekly's Ty Burr wrote of the film: "Proficiently filmed and utterly uninspired, it at least features a ghostly lead performance by Cybill's Alicia Witt and a final twist that's entertainingly stupid. But why do all the characters have to be such nasty little dorks? Oh, right, otherwise we'd care about them." Kim Newman of the British publication Sight & Sound wrote: "Urban Legend manages somehow to be rather endearing, from Natasha Gregson Wagner's opening bit (what must now, after Scream, be called 'the Drew Barrymore position') to the hokey shaggy-dog punchline."

On the review aggregator website Rotten Tomatoes, 32% of 68 critics' reviews are positive, with an average rating of 4.4/10. The website's consensus reads: "Elements of Scream reappear in a vastly inferior vehicle." Metacritic, which uses a weighted average, assigned the film a score of 35 out of 100, based on 15 critics, indicating "generally unfavorable" reviews, although audiences have scored it a positive 6.3 out of 10. Audiences polled by CinemaScore gave the film an average grade of "C" on an A+ to F scale.

=== Accolades ===
Institution	Year	Category	Recipient(s)	Result	Ref.
Fangoria Chainsaw Awards	1999	Best Actress	Alicia Witt	Nominated	
International Film Music Critics Association	1998	Best Original Score – Horror/Thriller	Christopher Young	Won	
Saturn Awards	1998	Best Performance by Younger Actor	Alicia Witt	Nominated	

== Franchise ==
=== Sequels ===
A sequel titled Urban Legends: Final Cut was released in 2000, and the direct-to-video film Urban Legends: Bloody Mary in 2005. Ghosts of Goldfield was originally intended to be the fourth entry in the franchise, but the title was dropped due to licensing issues.

=== Remake ===
In 2003, Whistle, an unofficial Indian Tamil-language remake was released.

=== Reboot ===
In February 2020, a reboot of the film was announced to be in development, to be written and directed by Colin Minihan. In August, Sydney Chandler, Katherine McNamara and Keith Powers were in talks to star in the film. In October 2022, Minihan revealed that the film had been cancelled due to "bad timing". In the following months, Eli Roth confirmed that it was due to the studio losing interest, and McNamara reported that it was due to the COVID-19 pandemic.

In April 2025, it was announced that a new reboot was in development by Screen Gems, with Shanrah Wakefield writing the script. Gary Dauberman and Neal H. Moritz are set to produce, with the story aiming to be "an examination of what an urban legend looks like in a post-digital world". In September 2026, original film star Rebecca Gayheart expressed interest in joining the cast.

== Sources ==
- Brunvand, Jan Harold (2002). Encyclopedia of Urban Legends. New York City, New York: W. W. Norton & Company. ISBN 978-0-393-32358-0.
- De Vos, Gail (2012). What Happens Next? Contemporary Urban Legends and Popular Culture. Santa Barbara, California: ABC-CLIO. ISBN 978-1-598-84634-8.
- Koven, Mikel (2008). Film, Folklore, and Urban Legends. Lanham, Maryland: Scarecrow Press. ISBN 978-0-810-86025-4.
- Koven, Mikel (2017). "Adapting legends: Urban legends and their adaptation in horror cinema". In Hand, Richard; McRoy, Jay (eds.). Monstrous Adaptations: Genetic and Thematic Mutations in Horror Film. Manchester, England: Manchester University Press. pp. 157–171. ISBN 978-1-526-12543-9.
- Tucker, Elizabeth (2005). Campus Legends: A Handbook: A Handbook. Santa Barbara, California: ABC-CLIO. ISBN 978-0-313-03816-7.
- West, Alexandra (2018). The 1990s Teen Horror Cycle: Final Girls and a New Hollywood Formula. Jefferson, North Carolina: McFarland. ISBN 978-1-476-63128-8.
