= John Ottman =

American film composer and editor (born 1964)

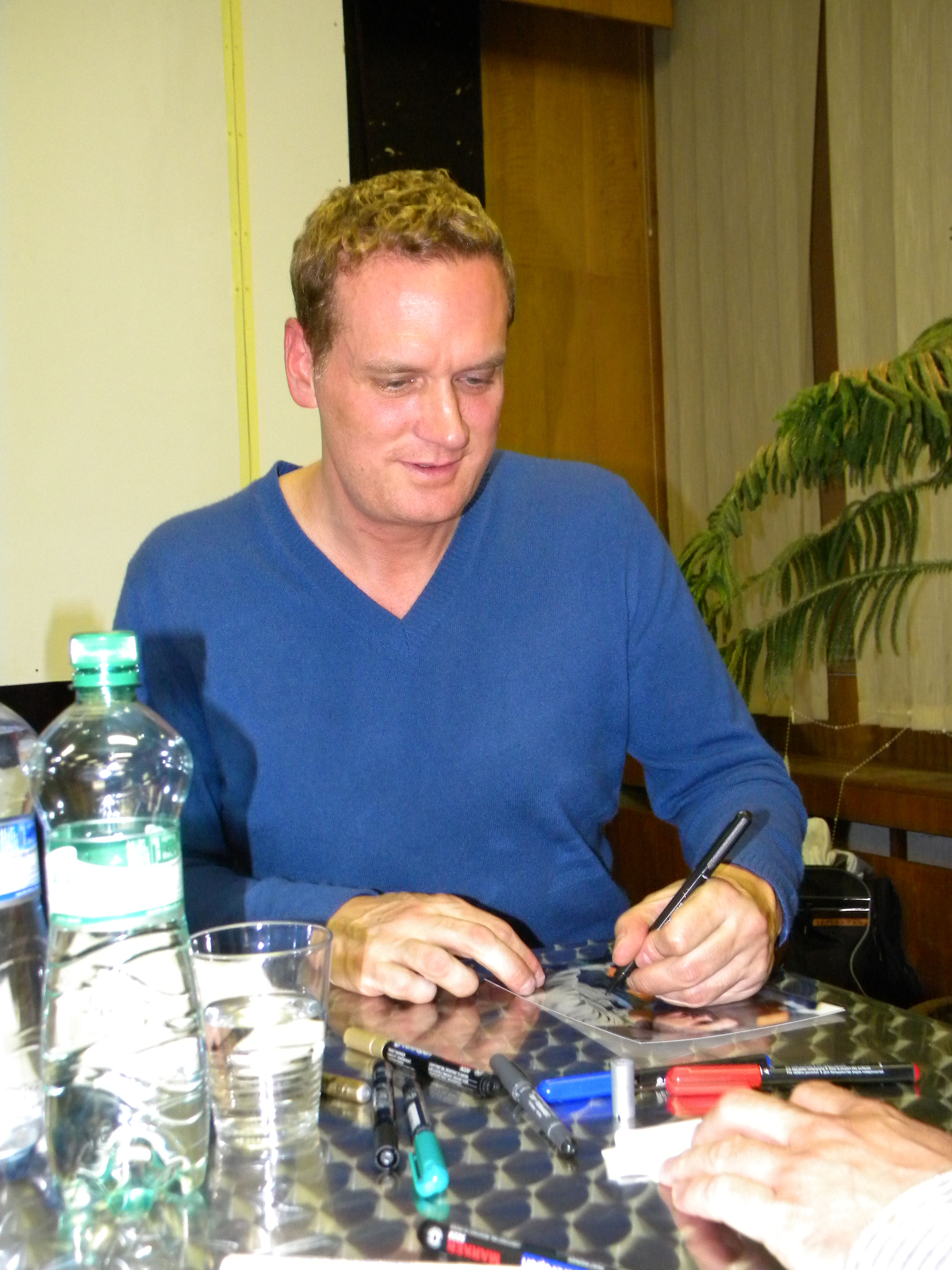
- Ottman in 2011

Background information
- Born: July 6, 1964 (age 62); San Diego, California, U.S.
- Genre: Film score
- Occupations: Composer, editor, and director
- Years active: 1993–present
- Website: www.johnottman.com

John Ottman (born July 6, 1964) is an American film composer, editor, and director. He is best known for collaborating with director Bryan Singer, scoring and/or editing many of his films, including Public Access (1993), The Usual Suspects (1995), Superman Returns (2006), Valkyrie (2008) and Jack the Giant Slayer (2013), as well as the X-Men film series. For his work on Singer's 2018 Queen biopic Bohemian Rhapsody, Ottman won the Academy Award for Best Film Editing.

== Life and career ==
Ottman was born in San Diego, California. Growing up in San Jose, Ottman made many amateur films garnering local attention in the community. He attended De Anza College and then transferred to the School of Cinematic Arts of the University of Southern California, where he graduated in 1988. One of his first assignments was to provide original music for the computer game I Have No Mouth, and I Must Scream. In 2007, Ottman appeared in the documentary Finding Kraftland for his agent Richard Kraft.

He is best known for his multi-tasking as editor and composer for Bryan Singer's films, and on a few occasions, producer roles to boot. The Usual Suspects, Apt Pupil, X2, Superman Returns (including adapting themes originally composed by John Williams), Valkyrie, Jack the Giant Slayer, X-Men: Days of Future Past and X-Men: Apocalypse. Other notable films he worked on as composer are Snow White: A Tale of Terror, the 2005 remake of House of Wax, Kiss Kiss Bang Bang, Fantastic Four and its sequel Fantastic Four: Rise of the Silver Surfer, The Invasion, and Astro Boy.

He also directed (in addition to editing and scoring) the 2000 horror film Urban Legends: Final Cut. He won a BAFTA Award for Best Editing for The Usual Suspects, as well as two Saturn Awards for Best Music for The Usual Suspects and Superman Returns. In 2019, he was nominated for a BAFTA Award for Best Editing and won the ACE Eddie Award and the Academy Award his work on Bohemian Rhapsody, a film Ottman saw through on his own after both directors' departure (Bryan Singer being fired and Dexter Fletcher beginning pre-production on Rocketman shortly after finishing the shoot.) Ottman navigated the film's development in post and the tricky waters between film-maker and studio, working with producer Graham King and Dennis O'Sullivan. Upon Bohemian Rhapsody getting nominated for, and winning its Best Editing awards, a scene of the band outside a pub went viral online after a post by YouTuber Thomas Flight, who was critical of the editing style. Ottman, aware of the clip, explained that for a test screening, a heightened pace for the first act was asked for by the studio. After the test, Ottman returned the scene to its original pace and design. Ottman regretted that he missed returning the scene outside the pub closer to his original version. The scene (directed by Fletcher) contained no master shot of the band at the table.

== Filmography ==
=== Composer ===
Discography
Feature films
Year	Title	Director	Notes	Distributed by
1993	Public Access	Bryan Singer		Occidental Studios; Cinemabeam
1995	The Usual Suspects	Bryan Singer		Spelling Films International; Gramercy Pictures; PolyGram Filmed Entertainment
1995	Night Train	John Coven	Short film	
1995	The Antelope Chess Game	Lance Tracy		
1996	The Cable Guy	Ben Stiller		Columbia Pictures
1997	Snow White: A Tale of Terror	Michael Cohn		PolyGram Filmed Entertainment; Interscope Communications
1997	Incognito	John Badham		Warner Bros. Pictures
1998	Goodbye Lover	Roland Joffé		Warner Bros. Pictures
1998	Halloween H20: 20 Years Later	Steve Miner	Themes by: John Carpenter	Miramax Films
1998	Apt Pupil	Bryan Singer		TriStar Pictures
1999	Lake Placid	Steve Miner		20th Century Fox
2000	Urban Legends: Final Cut	Himself	Also director	Columbia Pictures
2001	Bubble Boy	Blair Hayes		Buena Vista Pictures
2002	Pumpkin	Anthony Abrams; Adam Larson Broder		United Artists
2002	Eight Legged Freaks	Ellory Elkayem		Warner Bros. Pictures
2002	Trapped	Luis Mandoki		Columbia Pictures
2003	X2	Bryan Singer		20th Century Fox; Marvel Entertainment
2003	Gothika	Mathieu Kassovitz	Composed with: Lior Rosner	Warner Bros. Pictures; Columbia Pictures
2004	Cellular	David R. Ellis		New Line Cinema
2004	Imaginary Heroes	Dan Harris	Main theme only	Sony Pictures Classics
2004	Lonely Place	Kevin Ackerman	Short film	
2005	Hide and Seek	John Polson		20th Century Fox
2005	House of Wax	Jaume Collet-Serra		Warner Bros. Pictures
2005	Kiss Kiss Bang Bang	Shane Black		Warner Bros. Pictures
2005	Fantastic Four	Tim Story		20th Century Fox
2006	Superman Returns	Bryan Singer	Themes by: John Williams	Warner Bros. Pictures
2007	Fantastic Four: Rise of the Silver Surfer	Tim Story		20th Century Fox
2007	The Invasion	Oliver Hirschbiegel; James McTeigue		Warner Bros. Pictures
2008	Valkyrie	Bryan Singer		Metro-Goldwyn-Mayer
2009	Orphan	Jaume Collet-Serra		Warner Bros. Pictures
2009	Astro Boy	David Bowers		Summit Entertainment
2010	The RRF in New Recruit	David Bowers	Short film	Summit Entertainment
2010	Astro Boy vs. The Junkyard Pirates	David Bowers	Short film	Summit Entertainment
2010	The Losers	Sylvain White		Warner Bros. Pictures
2010	Halloween: The Night He Came Back	Eric Iyoob; Darla Rae	Short film	Film It Productions
2011	The Resident	Antti Jokinen		Image Entertainment
2011	Unknown	Jaume Collet-Serra	Composed with: Alexander Rudd	Warner Bros. Pictures; Optimum Releasing
2013	Jack the Giant Slayer	Bryan Singer		Warner Bros. Pictures
2014	Non-Stop	Jaume Collet-Serra		Universal Pictures
2014	X-Men: Days of Future Past	Bryan Singer		20th Century Fox
2016	The Nice Guys	Shane Black	Composed with: David Buckley	Warner Bros. Pictures
2016	X-Men: Apocalypse	Bryan Singer		20th Century Fox
Television
Year	Title	Director	Notes	Distributed by
1998	Fantasy Island	Michael Dinner	TV series theme and pilot score	Columbia TriStar Television
2002	Brother's Keeper	John Badham	Television film	USA Network
2002	Point of Origin	Newton Thomas Sigel	Television film	HBO Films
2015	Battle Creek	Bryan Singer	Episode: "The Battle Creek Way"	CBS Television Studios; Sony Pictures Television
2017	The Gifted	Bryan Singer		20th Television
Video documentaries
Year	Title	Director	Notes	Distributed by
2002	Round Up: Deposing The Usual Suspects			MGM Home Entertainment
2003	Evolution in the Details: The Design of X2		Short	20th Century Fox Home Entertainment
2003	The Second Uncanny Issue of X-Men! Making X2			20th Century Fox Home Entertainment
2004	Celling Out	Jeffrey Schwarz	Short	New Line Home Entertainment
2004	Dialing Up Cellular	Jeffrey Schwarz	Short	New Line Home Entertainment
Video games
Year	Title	Director	Notes	Distributed by
1995	I Have No Mouth, and I Must Scream	David Mullich		Cyberdreams MGM Interactive

=== Other credits ===
Editor
Year	Title	Director	Notes
1988	Lion's Den	Bryan Singer	
1993	Public Access	Bryan Singer	
1995	The Usual Suspects	Bryan Singer	
1998	Apt Pupil	Bryan Singer	
2000	Urban Legends: Final Cut	Himself	With Rob Kobrin
2003	X2	Bryan Singer	With Elliot Graham
2006	Superman Returns	Bryan Singer	With Elliot Graham
2008	Valkyrie	Bryan Singer	
2013	Jack the Giant Slayer	Bryan Singer	With Bob Ducsay
2014	X-Men: Days of Future Past	Bryan Singer	
2016	X-Men: Apocalypse	Bryan Singer	With Michael Louis Hill
2018	Bohemian Rhapsody	Bryan Singer	Academy Award Winner - Best Film Editing / BAFTA Award Nomination - Best Editing
2026	Michael	Antoine Fuqua	With Conrad Buff IV , Tom Cross and Harry Yoon
Director
Year	Title	Director	Notes
1988	Lion's Den	Himself	Directed with: Bryan Singer
2000	Urban Legends: Final Cut	Himself	Also composer
Producer
Year	Title	Director	Notes
1998	Apt Pupil	Bryan Singer	Associate producer
2008	Valkyrie	Bryan Singer	Executive producer
2013	Jack the Giant Slayer	Bryan Singer	Associate producer
2016	X-Men: Apocalypse	Bryan Singer	Co-producer

=== Miscellaneous ===
- 2023: His X-Men scores from X2 and X-Men: Days of Future Past were used for the Marvel Cinematic Universe film The Marvels.

== See also ==
- List of film director and composer collaborations
- List of film director and editor collaborations
