= X-Men: Apocalypse =

2016 film by Bryan Singer

- Theatrical release poster
- Directed by: Bryan Singer
- Screenplay by: Simon Kinberg
- Story by: Bryan Singer; Simon Kinberg; Michael Dougherty; Dan Harris
- Based on: X-Men by: Stan Lee; Jack Kirby
- Produced by: Simon Kinberg; Bryan Singer; Hutch Parker; Lauren Shuler Donner
- Starring: James McAvoy; Michael Fassbender; Jennifer Lawrence; Oscar Isaac; Nicholas Hoult; Rose Byrne; Tye Sheridan; Sophie Turner; Olivia Munn; Lucas Till
- Cinematography: Newton Thomas Sigel
- Edited by: John Ottman; Michael Louis Hill
- Music by: John Ottman
- Production companies: Marvel Entertainment; Bad Hat Harry Productions; Kinberg Genre; Hutch Parker Entertainment; The Donners' Company
- Distributed by: 20th Century Fox
- Release dates: May 9, 2016 (London); May 27, 2016 (United States)
- Running time: 144 minutes
- Country: United States
- Language: English
- Budget: $178 million
- Box office: $545 million

X-Men: Apocalypse is a 2016 American superhero film based on the Marvel Comics superhero team the X-Men. A sequel to X-Men: Days of Future Past (2014), it is the ninth in the X-Men film series. The film was directed by Bryan Singer, and written by Simon Kinberg, and stars James McAvoy, Michael Fassbender, Jennifer Lawrence, Oscar Isaac, Nicholas Hoult, Rose Byrne, Tye Sheridan, Sophie Turner, Olivia Munn, and Lucas Till. In the film, the ancient mutant En Sabah Nur / Apocalypse is inadvertently revived in 1983 and plans to recreate the world in his own image, leading the X-Men to try to stop him and defeat his team of mutants.

The film was announced by Singer in December 2013, with Kinberg, Michael Dougherty, and Dan Harris attached to develop the story. Casting began in October 2014, while principal photography commenced in April 2015 in Montreal and ended in August.

X-Men: Apocalypse premiered in London on May 9, 2016, and was released in the United States on May 27 by 20th Century Fox. The film received mixed reviews from critics and grossed $544 million. A sequel, Dark Phoenix, was released in 2019.

== Plot ==
In 3600 BC, the aged but powerful mutant En Sabah Nur rules ancient Egypt. Following a ceremony in which his consciousness is transferred into another man's body in order to gain his healing factor, he and his four followers, the Horsemen of Apocalypse, are betrayed by conspirators. In the process, his followers are killed and he is entombed alive.

In 1983, Scott Summers manifests his mutant powers to shoot concussive kinetic energy blasts from his eyes, so his older brother Alex takes him to Professor Charles Xavier's educational institute, hoping that Xavier and Hank McCoy will teach him to control his mutation. Scott meets and befriends Jean Grey upon arriving. In Egypt, En Sabah Nur is awakened by Moira MacTaggert while following a group of worshippers. He meets a mutant who can control weather, Ororo Munroe, and learns about humanity. Determined that humanity has lost its way, he plans to remake the world. Ororo becomes his follower after he enhances her power.

Meanwhile, in Communist Poland, Erik Lehnsherr lives happily with his wife Magda and daughter Nina. During the worldwide disturbances caused by En Sabah Nur's reawakening, Lehnsherr uses his powers to save a coworker during an earthquake, alerting the Milicja Obywatelska. They hold his daughter hostage in the forest to lure him into turning himself in. As tensions rise, Nina heartbrokenly demonstrates her animal communication mutant powers, and the police accidentally kill her and her mother in the ensuing confusion. In despair, Lehnsherr kills the police. In East Berlin, shape-shifting mutant Raven, revered as a mutant hero following the attack on Washington, D.C., (Note: As depicted in X-Men: Days of Future Past (2014)) rescues Kurt Wagner from a cage fight and requests black marketeer Caliban to transport Kurt to America. He reveals Lehnsherr's situation to her, leading Raven to take Kurt and request Xavier to find and rescue Lehnsherr. En Sabah Nur recruits Caliban's assistant Psylocke and another cage fighter Angel, and enhances both of their powers.

En Sabah Nur finds Lehnsherr and takes him back to Auschwitz where his parents were separated from him, (Note: As depicted in X-Men (2000), and X-Men: First Class (2011).) showing him the true extent of his powers; Lehnsherr destroys the camp and joins En Sabah Nur. When Xavier contacts Lehnsherr, En Sabah Nur remotely accesses Cerebro and forces Xavier to make countries launch their nuclear arsenals into space to prevent interference. He and his Four Horsemen arrive at the mansion and kidnap Xavier. Alex attempts to stop them but causes an explosion that destroys the mansion. Peter Maximoff, having learned he is Lehnsherr's biological son, arrives and uses his super-speed to evacuate everyone except Alex, whom Hank states was closest to the blast. Colonel William Stryker's forces, believing Xavier to be responsible, capture McCoy, Raven, Peter, and MacTaggert, and take them for interrogation. Scott, Jean, and Kurt secretly follow them and liberate their comrades using Stryker's experiment Weapon X, whose memories Jean partially restores.

Lehnsherr uses his powers to alter the Earth's magnetic field, causing destruction across the planet. En Sabah Nur plans to transfer his consciousness into Xavier's body to gain his psychic powers and thus control every mind on Earth. Xavier sends a telepathic distress call to Jean and the others, who travel to Cairo to battle En Sabah Nur and his Four Horsemen. They rescue Xavier and flee in a plane. When Angel and Psylocke attack the plane, Kurt teleports his friends away. Psylocke manages to jump safely and escape, but Angel is killed in the plane crash.

Lehnsherr and Ororo turn on En Sabah Nur and keep him occupied physically with Scott's help while Xavier fights him telepathically in the astral plane. Xavier begs Jean to unleash the full strength of her abilities, and she incinerates En Sabah Nur. Xavier restores MacTaggert's memory and they reconcile. Lehnsherr and Jean help reconstruct the school, but Lehnsherr turns down Xavier's offer to stay and help teach; Peter decides not to tell Lehnsherr yet about their relationship. Using confiscated Sentinels, McCoy and Raven train the new X-Men recruits: Scott, Jean, Ororo, Kurt, and Peter.

In a post-credits scene, vials of Weapon X's blood are placed in a briefcase belonging to the Essex Corporation.

== Cast ==
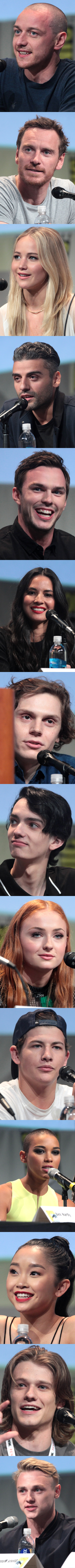
The cast of X-Men: Apocalypse at the 2015 San Diego Comic-Con. From top to bottom: McAvoy, Fassbender, Lawrence, Isaac, Hoult, Munn, Peters, Smit-McPhee, Turner, Sheridan, Shipp, Condor, Till, and Hardy
- James McAvoy as Professor Charles Xavier:
  A pacifistic mutant and the world's most powerful telepath, who is the founder of Xavier's School for Gifted Youngsters and leads the team of mutants known as the X-Men, in order to protect humankind and battle against the deadly enemy within. During the latter part of the film's production, McAvoy shaved his head for the role.
- Michael Fassbender as Erik Lehnsherr / Magneto:
  A mutant Auschwitz survivor with the ability to control magnetic fields and manipulate metal, who was once Xavier's closest ally and best friend, until his belief that mankind and mutantkind would never coexist led to their separation. He is globally infamous for attempting to assassinate U.S. President Richard Nixon on live broadcast 10 years prior.
  - Bill Milner appears in archival footage as a Young Erik.
- Jennifer Lawrence as Raven / Mystique:
  A mutant with shapeshifting abilities, globally renowned for saving Nixon's life 10 years prior. She was once Xavier's closest ally and his adoptive sister. Lawrence said, "she hears about what happened to Erik and she wants to seek him out and help him".
- Oscar Isaac as En Sabah Nur / Apocalypse:
  Born in ancient times, and presumably the world's first mutant, he has a variety of destructive superhuman abilities, including telekinesis, telepathy, technopathy, teleportation, force-field generation, and the ability to augment other mutants' abilities, as a result of being able to amass powers when transferring his consciousness from one body to another. Isaac described Nur as the "creative-slash-destructive force of the Earth". He added, "When things start to go awry, or when things seem like they're not moving towards evolution, [En Sabah Nur] destroys those civilizations." Isaac had to go through extensive makeup and prosthetics applications, 40 pounds (18 kg) suit, and wore high-heeled boots to appear taller. The full costume was uncomfortable, particularly in the humid environment of the outdoor scenes, which forced Isaac to go to a cooling tent between takes. Nur's previous old-form (seen at the beginning of the film) was played by Berdj Garabedian, a 70-year-old Canadian real estate agent, and avid silver screen fan in his first credited film role.
- Nicholas Hoult as Hank McCoy / Beast:
  A mutant with leonine attributes, prehensile feet and superhuman physical abilities. Hank acts as a teacher in Xavier's school and he builds inventions for troubled students. He also built the X-Jet.
- Rose Byrne as Moira MacTaggert:
  A CIA operative who first met and developed feelings for Xavier in X-Men: First Class (2011), where he wiped portions of her memories of him and the X-Men at the end. Simon Kinberg said they are "essentially, strangers" when they meet in this film.
- Tye Sheridan as Scott Summers / Cyclops:
  A mutant who fires destructive optic beams and wears a ruby visor or sunglasses to stabilize and contain them, and who is the younger brother of Havok. Sheridan describes Cyclops as "angry and a bit lost". He added, "He's now learning about being a mutant and trying to handle his powers."
- Sophie Turner as Jean Grey:
  A mutant who is scared of her telepathic and telekinetic power, and one of Charles Xavier's most prized students. Turner states that she was cast in the film because of the "dark side" of her character Sansa Stark in Game of Thrones (2011–2019). She compared Jean to Sansa and described being an outcast in the human world who struggles with her power and gift, the same way Sansa, who wanted to live a normal life, felt. Turner learned archery in preparation for the role.
- Olivia Munn as Psylocke:
  A mutant with psionic abilities. Her abilities include projecting purple psychic energy, usually into the form of an energy blade that can burn through metal. Munn described Psylocke as "very lethal, very powerful and very strong". She practiced sword fighting in preparation for the role.
- Lucas Till as Alex Summers / Havok:
  A mutant who has the ability to absorb energy and release it with destructive force from his body, and the older brother of Cyclops.
- Evan Peters as Peter Maximoff / Quicksilver:
  A mutant who can move, think, and perceive at hypersonic speeds, and the son of Magneto.
- Josh Helman as Col. William Stryker:
  A military officer who hates mutants and has, in the ten years since Days of Future Past, been developing his own plans for resolving "the mutant problem".
- Kodi Smit-McPhee as Kurt Wagner / Nightcrawler:
  A German teleporting mutant and one of Charles Xavier's new students. Singer said Nightcrawler is a source of comic relief.
- Ben Hardy as Angel:
  A mutant with bird-like feathered wings who gains metallic wings that can shoot razor sharp feather-projectiles, similar to his Archangel counterpart in the comics. Hardy practiced indoor skydiving in preparation for his role.
- Alexandra Shipp as Ororo Munroe / Storm:
  A young mutant orphan who can control weather. Storm is discovered by Apocalypse in Cairo. Shipp partially shaved her head to sport a Mohawk for the role.
- Lana Condor as Jubilee:
  A mutant student at Charles's school who has the ability to create psionic energy plasmoids. Discussing her first day on X-Men: Apocalypse, Condor stated, "I was very new and it was my first role. I'd never been on a set before or in front of a camera, so I didn't know what to expect. The first day we shot scenes in an 80s-themed mall with hundreds of extras in 80s gear, plus crew and cameras. It was surreal ... It's a lot easier when you have the costume, as that helps bring everything to life. She has her iconic yellow jacket, which is a staple. It's very bold and confident, like her. A lot of her costumes are super 80s. I also listened to music from the 80s and that helped."

Additionally, Carolina Bartczak and T.J. McGibbon play Erik's wife Magda and mutant daughter Nina, respectively. Tómas Lemarquis portrays Caliban, a mutant with the ability to sense and track other mutants, and wrestler "Giant" Gustav Claude Ouimet plays The Blob, Angel's opponent in an underground fight club. Monique Ganderton, Warren Scherer, Rochelle Okoye, and Fraser Aitcheson play Apocalypse's prior lieutenants, Death, Pestilence, Famine, and War respectively. Zehra Leverman reprised her role as Quicksilver's mother, Ms. Maximoff.

Hugh Jackman makes an uncredited appearance as Logan / Wolverine, in his Weapon X form. In that same scene, director Bryan Singer cameos as a guard who is killed by Wolverine as he attempts to escape the complex. X-Men co-creator Stan Lee and his wife Joan B. Lee make a cameo appearance together, as bystanders witnessing the launch of nuclear missiles worldwide; this was Joan's last film before her death the following year. Željko Ivanek cameos as a Pentagon scientist. Ally Sheedy cameos as Cyclops's teacher. Journalist Jessica Savitch and actors Leslie Parrish and Michael Forest (appearing in footage with dialogue from the 1967 Star Trek episode "Who Mourns for Adonais?") also appear in cameos.

== Production ==
=== Development ===
X-Men: Apocalypse was announced by Bryan Singer in December 2013 via Twitter, before X-Men: Days of Future Past (2014) was released to theaters. In the same month, Simon Kinberg, Dan Harris, and Michael Dougherty were revealed by Singer to be attached to work on the film's story. According to Singer, the film would focus on the origin of the mutants and feature the younger versions of Cyclops, Jean Grey and Storm. Singer also said that he was considering Gambit and a younger version of Nightcrawler to appear. According to Kinberg, it would take place in 1983, and completes a trilogy that began with X-Men: First Class (2011). In September 2014, 20th Century Fox officially announced that Singer would direct the film. Singer has called the film "kind of a conclusion of six X-Men films, yet a potential rebirth of younger, newer characters" and the "true birth of the X-Men".

=== Writing ===
It will address historical mutant-cy, meaning the deep past, mutant origins and things like that. It's something that's always intrigued me when we think about our Gods and our history and miracles and powers.

— Bryan Singer on what will be seen in X-Men: Apocalypse.

Singer said that Apocalypse is the main focus of the film. Kinberg said that the younger versions of Scott Summers, Storm and Jean Grey appearing in the film are "as much a part of the film as the main cast". He described Summers as "not yet the squeaky-clean leader", Storm as a "troubled character who is going down the wrong path in life", and Grey as "complex, interesting and not fully mature." Kinberg also said that the film delivers on the dramatic story and emotion of the last two films and that it acts like the culmination of the main characters portrayed by Lawrence, McAvoy, Fassbender, and Hoult. Kinberg said First Class, Days of Future Past, and Apocalypse formed a trilogy about Mystique, explaining,

She starts in First Class entirely on Charles' side, ends up following Erik, and we then find her in Days of Future Past and she's on her own because Erik is gone. She's on her own side in that movie but is drawn toward Charles by the end of the film and shoots Erik. Then in Apocalypse she comes back to Charles. There's a full circle narrative over the span of this little trilogy that is about Mystique from beginning with Charles in the mansion and ending with Charles in the mansion, but not as the same timid little girl we met in First Class.

Kinberg was paid $8 million for writing the script, the same amount he received for X-Men: Days of Future Past. The plot was partially inspired by the 1988 X-Men story arc "The Fall of the Mutants".

John Ottman, who edited the film together, noted that before filming, there were several issues with the screenplay that the production crew ultimately downplayed due to how complacent the studio had become while making X-Men: Days of Future Past. Ottman also noted that the script had no third act and instead simply featured bullet points explaining what could happen.

=== Casting ===
In October 2014, casting for X-Men: Apocalypse began. In November, Singer confirmed that Oscar Isaac would portray Apocalypse. In January 2015, Singer announced that Alexandra Shipp, Sophie Turner and Tye Sheridan would portray young Storm, Jean and Cyclops, respectively. Grace Fulton, who would go to play Mary Bromfield in the DC Extended Universe Shazam films, originally auditioned to play Jean Grey, but lost out to Turner. Ashley Benson was also considered for Jean Grey. The same month, Kinberg confirmed that Rose Byrne would reprise her First Class role as Moira MacTaggert in the film. In February, Kodi Smit-McPhee was cast as Nightcrawler and Ben Hardy was cast in an unspecified role. In March, Singer announced that Lana Condor was cast as Jubilation Lee. In April, Singer confirmed that Hardy would portray Angel, Olivia Munn would portray Psylocke, and Lucas Till would return as Havok. In May, Singer announced that the mutant Caliban would appear in the film. In July, Hoult revealed on Conan that Josh Helman would return as William Stryker. In April 2016, Hugh Jackman confirmed that he would make a cameo appearance as Logan / Wolverine.

=== Filming ===
Principal photography commenced on April 27, 2015, in Montreal, Canada. In late August, the first-unit production for the film wrapped. Additional filming took place in January 2016.

Australia-based Rising Sun Pictures provided, as it did for X-Men: Days of Future Past, the effects for Quicksilver's time-stopping, quick motion effects in the mansion rescue scene, and also other effects, including when Cyclops splits Professor X's favorite tree in half. Aerial footage of snow-capped mountains as Stryker traveled in his helicopter to the secret base was provided by SmartDrones of St. Albert, Alberta, Canada. Singer had at one point left the production for 10 days, forcing screenwriter Simon Kinberg to fill in as director. Singer claimed he had a thyroid issue and had to be treated in L.A.

=== Visual effects ===
The visual effects are provided by Moving Picture Company and Hydraulx and Supervised by Anders Langlands and Colin Strause with help from Digital Domain, Cinesite, and Rising Sun Pictures.

== Music ==
On March 2, 2015, it was announced that John Ottman, who composed the scores for X2 (2003) and X-Men: Days of Future Past, would return to write and compose the score for Apocalypse. On May 20, 2016, the official soundtrack was released as a digital download. In addition to Ottman's score, the film features a remix of the second movement of Ludwig van Beethoven's seventh symphony entitled "Beethoven Havok" and two songs contemporary to the film's 1983 setting, "Sweet Dreams (Are Made of This)" by Eurythmics and "The Four Horsemen" by Metallica.

== Release ==
=== Marketing ===
In July 2015, Singer, Lee, Jackman, and cast members McAvoy, Fassbender, Lawrence, Isaac, Hoult, Munn, Peters, Smit-McPhee, Turner, Sheridan, Shipp, Condor, Till, and Hardy gave a presentation at the 2015 San Diego Comic-Con, together with the release of the film's first teaser poster, featuring En Sabah Nur and a wreckage of the X-Mansion. Footage from the film was screened.

In October 2015, Mars Chocolate partnered with 20th Century Fox for the marketing of the film, using M&M chocolates in their promotional materials. The deal included retail displays and special packaging markings, TV and cinema commercials, and social media posts featuring M&M's characters mixed with elements of the X-Men. The first image of M&M candies wearing Storm and Magneto costumes was released on the day of the announcement.

In December 2015, Kia Motors collaborated with 20th Century Fox to create a custom Kia Sportage to promote the film. Designed after Mystique, the car was revealed at the 2016 Australian Open. It is Kia's second "X-Car" project after the Kia Sorento customized for the home media release of Days of Future Past and the 2015 Australian Open. A trailer released in the same month received criticism from Rajan Zed, a United States–based Hindu cleric, who stated that the part where Apocalypse claims himself to have been called "Krishna" was an offense to the Hindu religion, and demanded that Singer remove all references to Krishna from the trailer, and the film itself. The references to Krishna were removed from the film's final cut. On January 4, 2016, Kia Motors released the first promo video of the car, featuring Spanish tennis player Rafael Nadal.

Concerning the character Apocalypse, the director Bryan Singer has said,

The way I describe him the most, the best is he to me is the God of the Old Testament and all that comes with that. If there isn't the order and the worship then I'll open up the Earth and swallow you whole, and that was the God of the Old Testament. I started from there and when Oscar and I met we began discussing, since he isn't really God, he's the first mutant perhaps, but he's not God necessarily, he's imbued with certain unique powers. Some of them may or may not be from this Earth, we don't know.

In April 2016, Coldwell Banker partnered with 20th Century Fox to list the X-Mansion for $75 million. The fictional listing included a video tour of the mansion and stories of the home from the perspective of characters such as Charles Xavier and Scott Summers. The fake property was listed by agent Kala V. Rhomedren, an anagram for Raven Darkhölme. That same month, Fox released a faux TV show called "In the Footsteps of ..." narrated by George Takei which is inspired by the classic TV series In Search of ... that focuses on En Sabah Nur's origins. In May 2016, Fox released a faux TV commercial for the Xavier School for Gifted Youngsters with Lana Condor as Jubilee. They also released a video voiced mail message a week later and a faux TV show called Fables of the Flush & Fabulous with Robin Leach which is inspired by Leach's show Lifestyles of the Rich and Famous.

==== Billboard controversy ====
Billboards in Los Angeles and New York City promoting the film garnered controversy for showing an image of Apocalypse choking Mystique, with critics saying the ad advocates violence against women. Among those opposed to the material was actress Rose McGowan, who told The Hollywood Reporter: "There is a major problem when the men and women at 20th Century Fox think casual violence against women is the way to market a film. There is no context in the ad, just a woman getting strangled. The fact that no one flagged this is offensive and frankly, stupid." In apologizing for the billboard, Fox said it intended to remove the image from circulation.

=== Theatrical ===
X-Men: Apocalypse had its world premiere in London on May 9, 2016. The film was released in 20,796 screens across 76 international markets on May 18, 2016, one week before its North American debut. X-Men: Apocalypse was issued triple 3D, 4DX, and 2D formats, and in IMAX 3D in select international markets, using the DMR process. It opened in Korea on May 25 and in China on June 3. It was released in Japan on August 11.

=== Home media ===
The film was released by 20th Century Fox Home Entertainment on digital download on September 9, 2016, and on DVD, Blu-ray, 3D Blu-Ray, and Ultra HD Blu-ray on October 4, 2016. The film topped the national home video sales charts for the week ending on October 9, 2016.

X-Men: Apocalypse was released on The Walt Disney Company's streaming service Disney+ on July 17, 2020.

== Reception ==
=== Box office ===
X-Men: Apocalypse grossed $155 million in the U.S. and Canada and $388 million in other territories, for a worldwide total of $544 million against a budget of $178 million. The film became the third highest-grossing film in the X-Men series, behind Deadpool and X-Men: Days of Future Past. It made 27% less than Days of Future Past.

X-Men: Apocalypse opened in the United States on May 27, 2016, alongside Alice through the Looking Glass and was projected to gross around $80 million from 4,150 theaters in its opening three days, and up to $100 million over the four-day Memorial Day weekend. It made $8.2 million from Thursday previews at 3,565 theaters (better than its predecessor at $8.1 million). On its opening day it grossed $26.4 million (including previews), the fourth-lowest opening day amount of the franchise. In its first three days, it grossed $65.8 million on its way to grossing $79.8 million over the four-day Memorial weekend, including $9 million from 480 premium large format screens and $19 million from RealD screens. In its second weekend the film grossed $22.3 million (a drop of 66.1%), finishing second at the box office behind Teenage Mutant Ninja Turtles: Out of the Shadows.

Elsewhere, X-Men: Apocalypse was released one week before the United States in 76 markets, and grossed $101.5 million from 20,796 screens over the May 18 weekend. It debuted at no. 1 in 71 of those markets, with IMAX contributing $5 million from 246 screens in 57 markets, while RealD took in $18.4 million. It broke opening records for Fox in the Philippines ($4.9 million), India ($3.4 million), Indonesia ($3.1 million), Singapore ($2.8 million), Thailand ($2.7 million) and Colombia ($1.9 million), and had the biggest opening in the X-Men franchise in 33 markets, including Russia ($6.5 million). Its top openings were the United Kingdom ($10.5 million), Mexico ($8.6 million), Brazil ($6.6 million), Russia ($6.5 million) and France ($5.9 million). It opened in China on June 3 and brought in $59 million, the second-largest Fox opening in China and $20 million more than Days of Future Past. It opened next in Japan on August 11.

=== Critical response ===
On review aggregator Rotten Tomatoes, X-Men: Apocalypse holds an approval rating of 47% based on 334 reviews and an average rating of 5.6/10. The website's critical consensus reads, "Overloaded action and a clichéd villain take the focus away from otherwise strong performers and resonant themes, making X-Men: Apocalypse a middling chapter of the venerable superhero franchise." On Metacritic, the film has a weighted average score of 52 out of 100, based on 48 critics, indicating "mixed or average" reviews. Audiences polled by CinemaScore gave the film an average grade of "A−" on an A+ to F scale, while those at PostTrak gave it an overall positive score of 81% and a "definite recommend" of 62% .

Scott Mendelson of Forbes described the film as a "franchise killing disaster" writing "X-Men: Apocalypse is the kind of weightless, soulless trifle of a bore that makes comic book superhero movies look bad and makes me not look forward to the next installment." Birth.Movies.Death stated the film was a fiasco and a low point for the franchise, criticizing its action scenes, CGI, Oscar Isaac's Apocalypse, its lack of story, and waste of various X-Men characters.

Ignatiy Vishnevetsky of The A.V. Club commented, "Much of what makes X-Men: Apocalypse legitimately interesting also makes it frustrating and lopsided, since Singer and screenwriter-producer Simon Kinberg remain committed to the structure of an overlong comic-book blockbuster, complete with a climax in which the world has to be saved using as many different colors of energy beam as possible." Mike Ryan of Uproxx disparaged the film's story as redundant and stale, arguing "I get it: Life is hard for mutants. We all get it. It's literally the only thing mutants ever seem to talk about. It is odd that other superheroes seem to get to have some fun, but never the X-Men. Here we are, 16 years later, and everyone involved is still sad. It feels repetitive." Helen O'Hara of Empire criticized the storytelling and performances of the main cast, stating that the film "was a failed callback to various past glories."

On the other hand, Mick LaSalle from the San Francisco Chronicle gave the film a positive review, calling it "a thinking person's action movie" and complimenting its high stakes. Richard Roeper called the film "a visual feast" and lauded its cast, saying "Even the hardcore geeks who like to get their Comic-Con on, might be feeling a little superhero fatigue right about now. Still. You owe it to yourself to see Quicksilver do his thing."

Oscar Isaac, who played the title character Apocalypse, later expressed his disappointment with the film, commenting "Apocalypse, that was excruciating, I didn't know when I said yes that that was what was going to be happening. That I was going to be encased in glue, latex, and a 40-pound suit—that I had to wear a cooling mechanism at all times. I couldn't move my head, ever. And I had to sit on a specially designed saddle, because that's the only thing I could really sit on, and I would be rolled into a cooling tent in-between takes. And so I just wouldn't ever talk to anybody, and I was just gonna be sitting and I couldn't really move, and like, sweating inside the mask and the helmet. And then getting it off was the worst part, because they just had to kind of scrape it off for hours and hours." In an interview with The New York Times, he later remarked when asked that he doesn't "disown the film", though he wished they would have taken care of the character of Apocalypse a little better.

=== Accolades ===
List of awards and nominations
Year	Award	Category	Recipient(s)	Result	Ref.
2016	AACTA Awards	Best Visual Effects or Animation	John Dykstra, Matt Sloan, Blondel Aidoo, Stephen Hamilton, Tim Crosbie and Dennis Jones	Nominated	
2016	Hollywood Music in Media Awards	Best Original Score – Sci-Fi/Fantasy Film	John Ottman	Nominated	
2016	Spike Guys' Choice Awards	Jean-Claude Gahd Dam	Olivia Munn	Won	
2016	Teen Choice Awards	Choice Summer Movie	X-Men: Apocalypse	Nominated	
2016	Teen Choice Awards	Choice Movie: Hissy Fit	Hugh Jackman	Nominated	
2016	Teen Choice Awards	Choice Movie: Scene Stealer	Evan Peters	Nominated	
2016	Teen Choice Awards	Choice Movie: Breakout Star	Alexandra Shipp	Nominated	
2017	Golden Tomato Awards	Best Comic Book/Graphic Novel Movie 2016	X-Men: Apocalypse	4th Place	
2017	People's Choice Awards	Favorite Movie Actress	Jennifer Lawrence	Won	
2017	People's Choice Awards	Favorite Action Movie Actress	Jennifer Lawrence	Nominated	
2017	People's Choice Awards	Favorite Action Movie	X-Men: Apocalypse	Nominated	
2017	Saturn Awards	Best Comic-to-Film Motion Picture	X-Men: Apocalypse	Nominated	
2017	Saturn Awards	Best Director	Bryan Singer	Nominated	
2017	Saturn Awards	Best Make-up	Charles Carter, Rita Ciccozzi and Rosalina Da Silva	Nominated	
2017	Visual Effects Society Awards	Outstanding Compositing in a Photoreal Feature	"Quicksilver Rescue" – Jess Burnheim, Alana Newell, Andy Peel and Matthew Shaw	Nominated	
2017	Nickelodeon Kids' Choice Awards	Favorite Squad	James McAvoy, Alexandra Shipp, Sophie Turner, Jennifer Lawrence, Michael Fassbender, Nicholas Hoult, Evan Peters, Tye Sheridan, Ben Hardy, Kodi Smit-McPhee, Olivia Munn	Nominated	

== Sequel ==
In May 2016, Simon Kinberg said the next X-Men film would be set in the 1990s. He separately said the post-credits scene mentioning the Essex Corporation was related to Logan (2017), and that it could have ties to Gambit as well as the following X-Men film. Bryan Singer said he would be interested in having the villain Proteus in an X-Men film. He also said he would be stepping away from the franchise, but could envision returning later in some capacity. Amidst allegations of sexual abuse in 2017, Singer was removed from production after being involved in the earliest production stage. The film's sequel, Dark Phoenix, was released on June 7, 2019.
