= Finding Kraftland =

2006 American documentary film

- Movie Poster
- Directed by: Richard Kraft; Adam Shell
- Written by: Richard Kraft; Adam Shell
- Produced by: Richard Kraft
- Starring: Stacey J. Aswad; Richard Kraft; Nicholas Kraft
- Edited by: Adam Shell
- Distributed by: Independent
- Release date: January 27, 2006 (Santa Barbara)
- Country: United States

Finding Kraftland is a 2006 independent documentary from Richard Kraft productions starring Stacey J. Aswad, Richard Kraft, and Nicholas Kraft. It premiered at the Santa Barbara International Film Festival on January 27, 2006 and continued to play in over 75 film festivals around the globe.

== Plot ==
Finding Kraftland is structured as a top ten countdown of the coolest attractions in Kraftland, which is the name given to Richard Kraft's house. Though the host, Stacey, continually bounces around between Richard Kraft's collectibles, the real focus of the film is the bond that develops between Richard and his son Nicholas. Richard remarks that, when Nicholas was born, he didn't know what to make of him, saying he felt as though an "alien being" was living with him. He then goes on to say that, around the time Nicholas turns 3, he realizes that he is "the most interesting person on the planet." This begins a whirl-wind love affair between father and son that sees the two trek around the globe in order to ride every roller coaster, launch themselves into a zero-gravity flight, and generally seek as many thrills as life has to offer. This story unfolds as Richard's collection, which consists of James Bond collectibles from the 1960s, pieces of Disneyland and Walt Disney World attractions, thousands of board games, and advertising memorabilia from Richard's childhood, is displayed and pored over by Stacy. The other story line that develops is Richard's relationship with his deceased parents and older brother, David Kraft, who died in 1993 due to Crohn's disease. The documentary comes to a climax when it is discovered that Richard has also developed Crohn's.

== Music ==
Marc Shaiman provides a musical interlude with his performance of a song titled "Yes" which he wrote for his agent, Richard Kraft. The song pokes fun at Richard's inability to say "no" to any film project.

Nicholas Kraft also composed a piano piece for the film called Kronicles of Kraftland. It serves as the soundtrack for the ending montage. It is the only original piece of music in the film as all the other cues were picked by Richard Kraft from his extensive film music library.

Austin Wintory composed 21 variations of Kronicles of Kraftland titled Kronicles of Kraftland: 21 Film Score Parody Variations on a Theme as a 21st birthday present for Nicholas. The variations are all parodies of Richard Kraft's favorite composers.

== Production ==
Finding Kraftland was intended to be shown once at a joint birthday party for the Krafts and was made as a sweet 16 present for Nicholas from his father. The reception at the showing was so great that they decided to submit the documentary to festivals. Completion of the film took place hours before the premier as last minute changes were made and a final audio-mix had yet to be bounced.

== On screen contributors ==
- Stacey J. Aswad, (host)
- Richard Kraft
- Nicholas Kraft
- Christophe Beck
- Jon Brion
- Danny Elfman
- Alan Menken
- John Ottman
- Trevor Rabin
- Graeme Revell
- Marc Shaiman
- David Zippel

== Film festivals and awards ==
Finding Kraftland was picked to be shown at 62 film festivals, from 2007–2009, winning awards at the following festivals:

- 2007 Santa Fe Film Festival: Best Creative Spirit
- 2007 Central Florida Film Festival: Best Documentary
- 2007 River's Edge International Film Festival: Jury Award
- 2007 The Feel Good Film Festival: 2nd Place, Feature Films
- 2007 BSO Spirit Awards, Spain: Jerry Goldspirit Award (for music)
- 2007 Port Townsend Film Festival: Top Five Favorites, Audience Choice Awards
- 2008 Secret City Film Festival: First place, Documentary Films
- 2008 Tupelo Film Fest: First place, Documentary Films
- 2008 Twin Rivers Multimedia Festival: First place, Documentaries and Outdoor Films
- 2008 Black Earth Film Festival: Best of Fest
- 2008 Lake Havasu International Film Festival: Final Cut Award
- 2008 B Movie Film Festival: Best Documentary
- 2008 Phoenix Film Festival: Best Documentary
- 2008 Columbus International Film Festival: Honorable Mention
- 2008 Accolade Film Awards: Best Creativity/Originality, Best Editing, Best Humor/Humorist and Viewer Impact/Best Entertainment Value

== Sequels ==
Richard Kraft and his son Nicholas have expressed interest in making two sequels to Finding Kraftland. In an interview, Nicholas joked, "[...]the second one will be called Selling Kraftland. At the end of that movie, Richard dies and becomes Obi-Wan Kenobi for the third movie, where I raise my son and he gives me ghostly words of wisdom from beyond the grave." When asked if sequels to Finding Kraftland were seriously being considered, Richard responded, "Oh, absolutely! You can’t have lived this and then go, 'Well, that was the end of it!'"

== That's From Disneyland ==
In 2018, Richard & Nicholas partnered with Van Eaton Galleries to create That's From Disneyland! which was a month-long exhibit and auction of their entire Disney collection which attracted 50,000 people, including celebrities such as Slash, Darren Criss, Neil Patrick Harris, Rebel Wilson, John Landis, Drew Carey, Rachel Bloom, Ben Schwartz and Paul Scheer. The Krafts referred to the exhibit as "Selling Kraftland." The exhibit of Richard's entire Disney collection culminated in a two-day auction which netted $8.3M from the sale of Disney memorabilia" Magician David Copperfield purchased the Disneyland Hotel neon letter “D” for $86,250. American television personality Kris Jenner purchased animatronic dolls from the It's a Small World ride as a Christmas gift for her daughter, Kourtney Kardashian.
