= Urban Legends: Bloody Mary =

2005 film by Mary Lambert

- DVD cover
- Directed by: Mary Lambert
- Written by: Michael Dougherty; Dan Harris
- Based on: Urban Legend by Silvio Horta
- Produced by: Aaron Merrell; Louis Phillips; Scott Messer
- Starring: Kate Mara; Robert Vito; Tina Lifford; Ed Marinaro; Lillith Fields
- Cinematography: Ian Fox
- Edited by: Michelle Harrison
- Music by: Jeff Rona
- Production company: NPP Productions
- Distributed by: Sony Pictures Home Entertainment
- Release date: July 19, 2005
- Running time: 93 minutes
- Country: United States
- Language: English

Urban Legends: Bloody Mary (also known as Urban Legends 3: Bloody Mary or simply Urban Legend 3) is a 2005 American direct-to-video supernatural slasher film directed by Mary Lambert, and starring Kate Mara, Robert Vito, Tina Lifford, Ed Marinaro, and Lillith Fields. A standalone sequel to Urban Legends: Final Cut (2000), it is the third and final installment in the Urban Legend film series, although it is almost entirely unrelated to both of the films that came before it, using supernatural elements instead of a whodunit formula. The film follows three high school students who inadvertently summon the ghost of a dead high-school girl, who starts coming after her old classmates.

Urban Legends: Bloody Mary was released by Sony Pictures Home Entertainment on July 19, 2005.

== Plot ==
On November 5, 1969, three high school football players try to drug and kidnap their prom night dates. Their plan works with two of the girls but the third, Mary Banner (Lillith Fields), tries to escape. The football captain chases her into a storage room and punches her, knocking her out. He panics and locks her body in a trunk, thinking she is dead. She wakes up later locked in the trunk, eventually dying inside it.

35 years later, the story is told among three school girls during a sleepover. Samantha "Sam" and her two friends, Martha and Mindy, jokingly conjure up Bloody Mary and the next morning all three are gone. After having been missing for one day, they reappear, waking up in an old deserted mill, with no knowledge of how they got there. While most suspect a hoax on the girls' part, Sam and her brother David suspect that it is some prank on the football team's part.

While Sam is haunted by visions of a dead girl bleeding from her head, several pupils die under mysterious circumstances resembling urban legends; football player Roger burns in a sunbed. The next day, Sam's friend Heather has spiders burst from her cheek and gets her face mutilated by broken mirror shards, and football player Tom is electrocuted while urinating on an old electrical fence.

In her homework, Sam finds notes that had been sent to Heather about Mary Banner's disappearance and the 1969 homecoming kidnappings. She looks through school paper archives, where she learns that Mary was never found and is presumed dead, and that another victim of the kidnappings, Grace Taylor, still lives in town. Sam and David visit Grace, who claims that Mary's "life force" is exacting revenge on the children of the five people involved in the kidnappings, but that she cannot (or will not) reveal the names of the perpetrators.

The siblings go to warn the school's football captain and Heather's boyfriend Buck, who has been blaming Sam and David for the recent deaths. Buck reveals that his father, Coach Jacoby, the football coach, was one of the kidnappers in 1969, but that he did not hurt Mary. Later, Buck is attacked and murdered by a demonic visage of Mary whilst at a motel.

David is directed to the school archives by Grace and discovers the identity of the fifth person involved in the kidnappings. He rushes home, but finds Sam gone and is suffocated by a hooded figure. Meanwhile, Sam has another vision of Mary, revealing that she was still alive when she was locked in the trunk, but suffocated to death soon after waking up. The visions also reveal to Sam the whereabouts of the trunk. Sam visits Grace, who reluctantly agrees to drive Sam to the school. There, Sam finds the storage room and the trunk with Mary's body. She is nearly attacked by the hooded figure, but manages to escape while carrying Mary's remains outside to the van.

Finding Grace unconscious, Sam drives the van to the cemetery, where she begins to dig a grave for Mary under her headstone. Her stepfather Bill, whom Sam had phoned, also appears, and helps her dig before he suddenly hits Sam with the shovel. Bill reveals to Sam that he was the one that locked Mary in the trunk, and that he also killed David. He attempts to kill her to stop her from telling law enforcement, before Mary's ghost appears and kills him. After the emergency services arrive, Sam and Grace are treated by personnel as they sit consoling one another.

== Cast ==
- Kate Mara as Samantha "Sam" Owens
- Robert Vito as David Owens
- Tina Lifford as Grace Taylor
  - Charlene Baptista as Young Grace
- Ed Marinaro as Bill "Willy" Owens
  - Daniel B. Culmer as Young Willy
- Michael Gregory Coe as Buck Jacoby
- Lillith Fields as Mary Banner
- Nancy Everhard as Pam Owens
- Audra Lea Keener as Heather Thompson
- Don Shanks as Coach Jacoby
- Jeff Olson as Sheriff Thompson McKenna
- Nate Heard as Tom Higgins
- Brandon Sacks as Roger Dalton
- Hailey Evans as Martha
- Olesya Rulin as Mindy
- Odessa Rae as Natalie
- Haley McCormick as Gina Lotnick
- Rooney Mara as Classroom Girl #1

== Production ==
Principal photography began in Salt Lake City, Utah on November 20, 2004, and ended on December 16.

== Release ==
The film was released direct-to-video on July 19, 2005.

== Reception ==
On Rotten Tomatoes, the film has an approval rating of 40% with an average rating of 4.4/10 based on five reviews. Felix Vasquez Jr. of Cinema Crazed gave the film a mixed review, writing, "'Bloody Mary' is not the worst movie on video store shelves as many people have claimed, but it's just not effective enough to ever be anything more than a simple horror movie about urban legends." Geoffrey D. Roberts of ReelTalk.com called the film "a flat, one-note ripoff" and criticized its lack of scares.

== Future ==
Ghosts of Goldfield was originally intended to be the fourth entry in the franchise, but the title was dropped due to licensing issues.

In February 2020, a reboot of the film series was announced to be in development.

== See also ==
- Bloody Mary folklore in popular culture
