= Matthew Davis =

American actor (born 1978)

Matt Davis
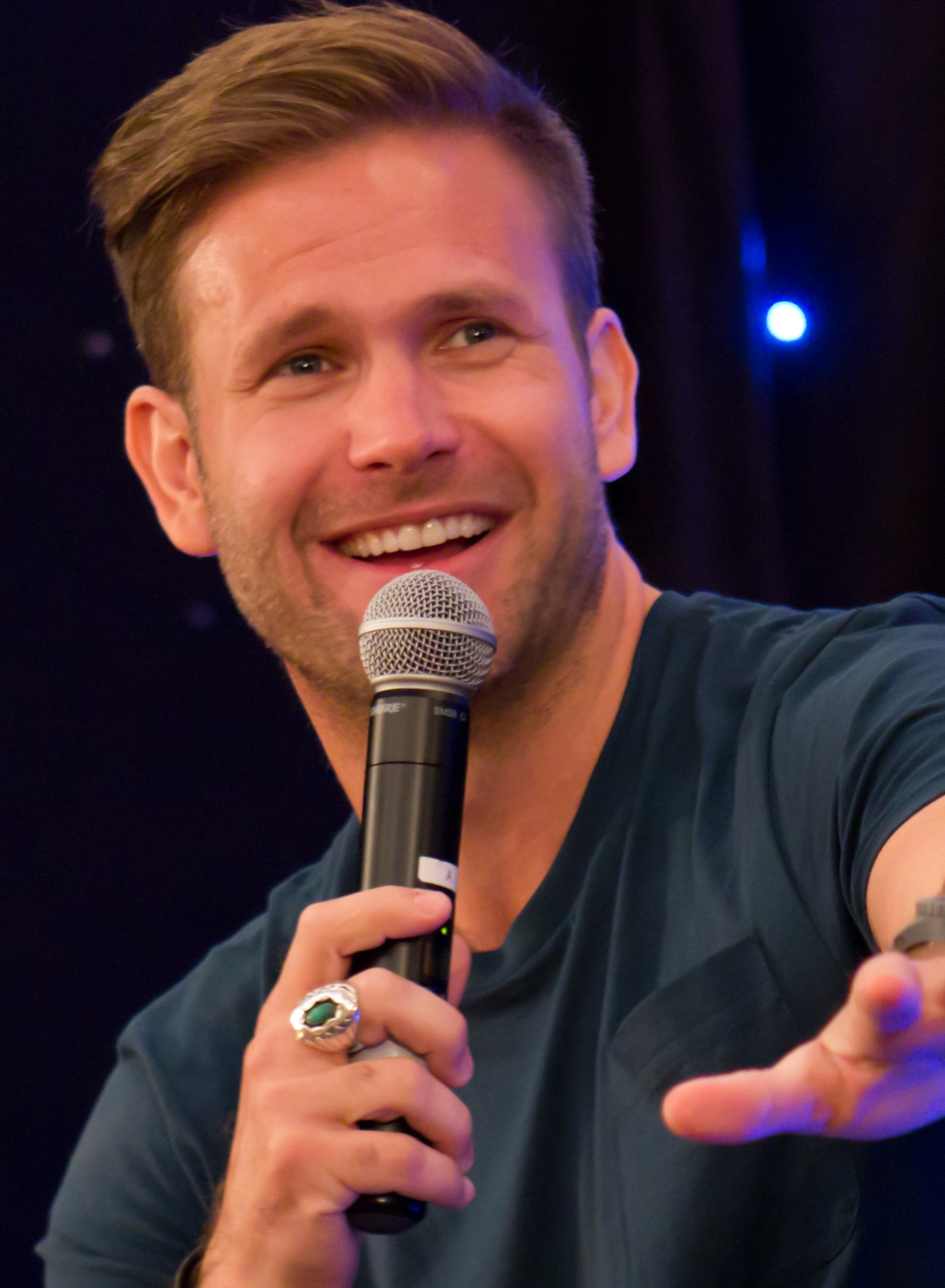
- Davis in 2013
- Born: Matthew Wadsworth Davis; May 8, 1978 (age 48); Salt Lake City, Utah, U.S.
- Education: University of Utah
- Occupation: Actor
- Years active: 2000–present
- Spouse: Kiley Casciano (m. 2018; div. 2024)
- Children: 2

Matthew Wadsworth Davis (born May 8, 1978) is an American actor. He is known for his roles as Warner Huntington III in Legally Blonde, Adam Hillman on the ABC comedy-drama What About Brian (2006–2007) and Alaric Saltzman on The CW fantasy drama The Vampire Diaries (2009–2017) as well as the spin-off series Legacies (2018–2022).

Davis starred on the short-lived CW mystery and horror drama Cult as Jeff Sefton, and had a recurring role on the CBS police drama CSI: Crime Scene Investigation as Sean Yeager.

== Early life ==
Davis was born in Salt Lake City, Utah. He attended Woods Cross High School and the University of Utah.

== Career ==
In 2000, Davis was cast in the Vietnam War film, Tigerland as Private Jim Paxton opposite Colin Farrell and in a dual role as Travis / Trevor Stark in the second installment of Urban Legend film series. The following year, Davis co-starred with Reese Witherspoon and Selma Blair in the comedy Legally Blonde (2001), as Witherspoon's love interest Warner Huntington III. The film was a commercial success and garnered generally positive reviews from critics, grossing over $96.5 million in North America and $141.7 million worldwide. He also appeared in Michael Bay's war drama, Pearl Harbor as Second Lieutenant Joe McKinnon in 2001. Davis then played the role of Matt Tollman in the 2002 surfing movie Blue Crush.

He continued with appearances in films such as Seeing Other People (2004), Heights (2004), Into the Sun (2005), BloodRayne (2005) and Bottoms Up (2006). That same year he began starring in the ABC comedy drama television series What about Brian as Adam Hillman, a lawyer and the best friend of the titular character. He was in the show for two seasons until it ended in 2007.

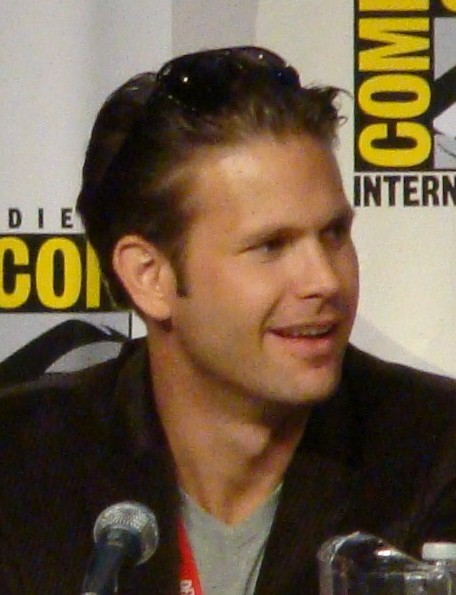
Davis at the 2010 San Diego Comic-Con

Davis starred in The CW fantasy drama The Vampire Diaries, as Alaric Saltzman since 2009. He also played the role of Jeff Drake, an award-winning director of adult films in the comedy film Finding Bliss in June 2010. In April 2012, Davis was cast as Jeff Sefton, a journalist blogger on the short-lived CW psychological thriller series Cult. He also had a recurring role in the CBS police drama CSI: Crime Scene Investigation from 2013 to 2014 in the 14th season, as swing shift CSI Sean Yeager. He appeared in the sixth episode titled "Passed Pawns", the eighth episode titled "Helpless", and the 13th episode titled "Boston Brakes". He later returned to the hit The CW show The Vampire Diaries for its sixth season as Alaric Saltzman once again as a series regular.

Davis starred in The CW series Legacies, a spin-off of The Originals, from 2018 to 2022 where he reprised his role as Alaric Saltzman. He also starred as Nick Sinclair in the 2019 Hallmark Christmas film, Christmas Wishes and Mistletoe Kisses alongside Jill Wagner.

In April 2024, it was announced that Davis would star in the NBC drama series Grosse Pointe Garden Society.

== Personal life ==
Davis was married to actress Kiley Casciano on December 23, 2018, and their two daughters were born in 2020 and 2022, respectively. The couple's marriage ended in February 2024. Davis and Casciano share joint custody of their daughters.

In regards to his political views, Davis has publicly described himself as a social libertarian and a fiscal conservative.

In April 2020, the headline #matthewdavisisoverparty trended on Twitter following a series of controversial posts by Davis that many fans had deemed racist and xenophobic. In response, he tweeted: "What I am NOT: is a racist, bigot, xenophobic, transphobic, homophobic, white supremacist, pedophile. All vile names I’ve been called by those on the Tolerant Left. Anyone who knows me knows these slanderous and despicable accusations are flagrantly untrue."

== Filmography ==
=== Film ===
Year	Title	Role	Notes
2000	Tigerland	Private Jim Paxton	
2000	Urban Legends: Final Cut	Travis Stark / Trevor Stark	
2001	Pearl Harbor	Joe McKinnon	
2001	Legally Blonde	Warner Huntington III	
2002	Lone Star State of Mind	Jimbo	
2002	Blue Crush	Matt Tollman	
2002	Below	Odell	
2003	Something Better	Skip	
2004	Seeing Other People	Donald	
2004	Shadow of Fear	Harrison French	
2004	Heights	Mark	
2005	Into the Sun	Sean Mack	
2005	BloodRayne	Sebastian	
2006	Mentor	Carter	
2006	Bottoms Up	Johnny Cocktail	
2007	Wasting Away	Mike	
2009	Finding Bliss	Jeff Drake	
2009	S. Darko	Pastor John Wayne	
2010	Waiting for Forever	Aaron	

=== Television ===
Year	Title	Role	Notes
2006–2007	What About Brian	Adam Hillman	Main role
2008	Law & Order: Special Victims Unit	Pearson Junior "PJ" Bartlett	Episode: "Trade"
2009	Limelight	David	Television film
2009	In Plain Sight	Lewis Folwer	Episode: "Rubble with a Cause"; as Matt Davis
2009–2010	Damages	Josh Reston	Recurring role
2009–2017	The Vampire Diaries	Alaric Saltzman	Main role (seasons 1–3, 6–8); Recurring role (season 4-5)
2013	Cult	Jeff Sefton	Main role
2013–2014	CSI: Crime Scene Investigation	Sean Yeager	3 episodes
2017–2018	The Originals	Alaric Saltzman	Special guest star (seasons 4–5)
2018–2022	Legacies	Alaric Saltzman	Main role
2019	Christmas Wishes & Mistletoe Kisses	Nick Sinclair	Main role
2025	Grosse Pointe Garden Society	Joel	Main Role
