= Dan Harris (screenwriter) =

American screenwriter and director (born 1979)

- Born: August 29, 1979 (age 47); Kingston, Pennsylvania, United States
- Education: Columbia University
- Occupations: Screenwriter, director

Dan Harris (born August 29, 1979) is an American screenwriter and director best known for working with Michael Dougherty and Bryan Singer, and whose writing credits include Superman Returns, X2 and X-Men: Apocalypse.

== Early life ==
Harris was raised in Kingston, Pennsylvania. He went to Wyoming Valley West Middle and High schools, and graduated from Wyoming Seminary. Before he received his bachelor's degree from Columbia University, Harris's short film Urban Chaos Theory won the Grand Jury Prize for Best Short Film at the NoDance Film Festival, and the following winter, his short film, "The Killing of Candice Klein", played at the 2002 Sundance Film Festival.

== Career ==
Harris made his feature film directing debut with Imaginary Heroes, starring Sigourney Weaver, Jeff Daniels, Emile Hirsch and Michelle Williams. The film had its world premiere at the 29th Toronto International Film Festival and opened Winter 2005 after being given special recognition for excellence in filmmaking from the National Board of Review.

In addition to Superman Returns, Harris and his writing partner Michael Dougherty have co-written many films, including Urban Legends: Bloody Mary and X2, which he wrote at the age of 22 for director Bryan Singer, an assignment offered to him after the director read the screenplay for Imaginary Heroes. In the same year, he was honored as one of Variety’s top 10 screenwriters to watch.

Harris directed I, Lucifer, a film based on the novel which he adapted with Michael Dougherty. Harris and Dougherty opted out of writing the upcoming Superman sequel.

Harris co-wrote X-Men: Apocalypse with Singer, Dougherty and Simon Kinberg.

Also with Dougherty and Singer, Harris wrote the Superman Returns prequel comic books for DC Comics.

Harris' photography has twice been published by New York fashion and arts landmark Visionaire and he was part of Vanity Fair's "Hollywood Portfolio" in 2005.

== Filmography ==
Year	Film	Credit	Notes
1998	Celebrity	Production assistant	
1999	Dancing with Agnes	Director, written by, editor	Short film, as Daniel P. Harris
1999	Mickey Blue Eyes	Production assistant	Uncredited
2000	Urban Chaos Theory	Director, written by, executive producer	Short film, as Daniel P. Harris
2000	The Unbreakable Likeness of Lincoln	Director, executive producer	Short film, as Daniel P. Harris
2002	The Killing of Candice Klein	Director, written by	Short film
2003	X2: X-Men United	Screenplay by	Co-wrote screenplay with Michael Dougherty and David Hayter, based on a story by Zak Penn and David Hayter & Bryan Singer
2004	Imaginary Heroes	Director, written by	
2005	Urban Legends: Bloody Mary	Written by	Co-wrote with Michael Dougherty
2006	Superman Returns	Screenplay by, story by	Co-wrote screenplay with Michael Dougherty, co-wrote story with Bryan Singer & Michael Dougherty
2007	Until Death	Written by	Co-wrote with James Portolese
2007	Rubberheart	Special thanks	
2007	Trick 'r Treat	Executive producer	
2013	Imprints	Producer	Short film
2016	X-Men: Apocalypse	Story by	Co-wrote story with Bryan Singer & Simon Kinberg & Michael Dougherty
2017	Speech & Debate	Director, executive producer	
