= Ghosts of Goldfield =

- Official DVD/Blu-ray cover
- Directed by: Ed Winfield
- Written by: Dominic Biondi; Brian McMahon
- Produced by: Debra Isaacs
- Starring: Kellan Lutz; Marnette Patterson; Mandy Amano; Scott Whyte; Chuck Zito; Ashly Margaret Rae; John Bloom; Teri Corcoran; Roddy Piper
- Cinematography: Adrian M. Pruett; Roland 'Ozzie' Smith
- Edited by: Bryan Todd
- Music by: Steve Yeaman
- Production company: 18th Avenue Productions
- Release date: 27 March 2007
- Running time: 88 minutes
- Country: United States
- Language: English

Ghosts of Goldfield is a 2007 American supernatural horror film directed by Ed Winfield. This film music composed by Steve Yeaman. The film stars Kellan Lutz, Marnette Patterson, Mandy Amano, Scott Whyte, Chuck Zito and Ashly Margaret Rae in the lead roles. The film was originally intended to be a fourth installment of the Urban Legend film series, serving as a standalone sequel to Urban Legends: Bloody Mary (2005); however, the title was abandoned due to licensing issues.

== Plot ==
A group of five led by Julie set up their filming equipment in the hotel of the derelict town of Goldfield, hoping to capture footage of the ghost of Elisabeth Walker, a maid tortured and killed in room 109. Troubled by visions, Julie discovers that a necklace, handed down to her from her grandmother, is somehow connecting her to this tragedy.

== Cast ==
- Kellan Lutz as Chad
- Marnette Patterson as Julie
- Mandy Amano as Keri
- Scott Whyte as Dean
- Chuck Zito as George Winfield
- Ashly Margaret Rae as Elizabeth Walker
- John Bloom as Clancy
- Teri Corcoran as Can-can dancer
- Roddy Piper as Jackson Smith
- Richie Chance as Mike
