= Urban Legends: Final Cut =

2000 film by John Ottman

- Theatrical release poster
- Directed by: John Ottman
- Written by: Paul Harris Boardman; Scott Derrickson
- Based on: Urban Legend by Silvio Horta
- Produced by: Gina Matthews; Neal H. Moritz; Richard Luke Rothschild
- Starring: Jennifer Morrison; Matthew Davis; Hart Bochner; Joseph Lawrence; Anthony Anderson; Loretta Devine
- Cinematography: Brian Pearson
- Edited by: John Ottman; Rob Kobrin
- Music by: John Ottman
- Production companies: Columbia Pictures; Original Film; Phoenix Pictures
- Distributed by: Sony Pictures Releasing
- Release date: September 22, 2000 (United States)
- Running time: 99 minutes
- Countries: United States; Canada; France
- Language: English
- Budget: $14 million
- Box office: $38.6 million

Urban Legends: Final Cut is a 2000 slasher film directed by John Ottman in his directorial debut, and starring Jennifer Morrison, Matthew Davis, Hart Bochner, Joseph Lawrence, Anthony Anderson, and Loretta Devine. In addition to directing, Ottman also edited the film and composed its score. A sequel to Urban Legend (1998), it is the second installment in the Urban Legend film series. It follows a film student being stalked by a serial killer in a fencing mask, who begins murdering the crew members of her thesis film about urban legends. The film is an international co-production film between the United States, Canada and France.

Filmed in late 1999, Urban Legends: Final Cut was theatrically released in the United States on September 22, 2000, by Sony Pictures Releasing. Although it made only roughly half of its predecessor's gross, it was still successful, grossing $38.6 million on a budget of $14 million. The film was universally panned by critics upon release, and was followed by the direct-to-video sequel Urban Legends: Bloody Mary in 2005.

== Plot ==
After conversing with security guard Reese Wilson about a murder spree that happened on the campus where she had previously worked, (Note: As depicted in Urban Legend (1998)) Amy Mayfield, a student at prestigious film school Alpine University, is inspired to make her thesis film about a serial killer murdering in the fashion of urban legends. Meanwhile, fellow student Lisa has a drink with classmate Travis Stark at a bar before her flight. Starting to feel dazed, she is attacked and awakens in a bathtub filled with ice, discovering that her kidney has been removed. Attacked by her abductor, she tries to flee through the window, but is decapitated.

The next day, Amy is preparing to shoot her film but the assigned camera man, Toby Belcher, quits and accuses her of stealing his thesis idea. When Sandra Petruzzi, Amy's actress friend who played a victim in a scene, returns to an empty studio after forgetting her keys, she is killed with a straight razor. Her peers witness her filmed death when the material is smuggled into a sequence of takes of the scene. Amy is disturbed by it, but her peers discount it as part of a showreel.

Travis is said to have committed suicide in the campus tower. At his funeral, Graham Manning, the son of a Hollywood director, offers to help Amy with her film; when she declines, he reveals that her father was a famous documentarian, which she has concealed from most of their peers. Afterwards, Travis' twin brother, Trevor, shares his belief that his brother was murdered. Later, while Amy is recording audio loops of screams for the film, the killer, wearing a fencing mask, fatally beats replacement cameraman Simon Jabuscko outside with his own camera, and the audio is inadvertently recorded. He then attacks and chases her through the campus but she evades him.

Before the filming of another scene in an empty carnival ride, sophomores Stan Washington and Dirk Reynolds are attacked and electrocuted while preparing the set. Amy discovers the corpses, escapes a confrontation with the killer, and informs the police, who attribute the deaths to accidental electrocution. Trevor comforts Amy, and during their period of sexual intercourse, he suddenly stabs her. She awakens, realizing that it was only a dream, but then notices a light inside the bell tower. When Amy arrives there, her friend Vanessa Valdeon presents a note addressed to her that Amy supposedly wrote expressing romantic feelings for Vanessa, but Amy denies writing the note. The killer startles them and pursues them after Amy presses a panic button. Once upstairs, the 2 girls hide in a closet, but the killer discovers them, grabs Vanessa and locks Amy in. Trying to get out, she discovers the corpses of Simon and Sandra. Managing to break down the door, she finds Vanessa's corpse hanging from the bell. Amy runs out passing Reese, who was notified of the disturbance via the campus security system.

Trevor tells Amy all the victims worked on Travis' thesis film. After watching some footage, they suspect Toby, the only person who worked on the film that is still alive, kidnap him, and summon Professor Solomon to an empty film set to present their suspicions. However, Toby reveals that he never went anywhere near Travis' film. Graham encounters the confrontation, and in the confusion, Solomon reveals himself as the killer, attempting to frame Amy and usurp the Hitchcock Award – which includes a large stipend – by presenting Travis' film as his own. In the ensuing melee, Amy wrestles his gun from him and holds him at gunpoint. Reese stumbles upon the scene, and a standoff occurs. Solomon leaps at Amy, who discharges the gun in his abdomen.

At the Hitchcock Awards ceremony a few months later, Trevor attends to accept the award on his brother's behalf. As he goes onstage, Reese shoots production assistant Kevin, who appears as a sniper in the rafters. The altercation is revealed to be a scene in Amy's new film, Urban Legends, on which Toby and Graham are working on her behalf. Later, Solomon, now using a wheelchair, is in a mental institution where, after he watches Amy's film, a nurse (Brenda Bates, from the original film) asks him if he enjoyed the movie. She wheels him out, explaining that they have a lot in common.

== Cast ==
- Jennifer Morrison as Amy Mayfield
- Matthew Davis as Travis Stark / Trevor Stark
- Hart Bochner as Professor Solomon
- Loretta Devine as Reese Wilson
- Joseph Lawrence as Graham Manning
- Eva Mendes as Vanessa Valdeon
- Jessica Cauffiel as Sandra Petruzzi
- Anson Mount as Toby Belcher
- Anthony Anderson as Stan Washington
- Michael Bacall as Dirk Reynolds
- Marco Hofschneider as Simon Jabuscko
- Derek Aasland as P.A. Kevin
- Jacinda Barrett as Lisa
- Peter Millard as Dr. Fain
- Chas Lawther as Dean Patterson
- Chuck Campbell as Geek in Plane
- Yani Gellman as Rob
- Rory Feore as Killer Flight Attendant
- Jeannette Sousa as Libby
- Rebecca Gayheart as Brenda Bates (uncredited cameo)

== Production ==
=== Development and writing ===
The screenplay for Urban Legends: Final Cut was written by Paul Harris Boardman and Scott Derrickson. Ottman sought a "wacky" tone for the film that was more tongue-in-cheek than that of its predecessor.

=== Pre-production ===
Anson Mount originally auditioned for the dual role of Travis / Trevor Stark, but had wanted to play the role of the antagonistic Toby instead; according to Ottman, he "aced" his audition for Toby, and was cast in the role. Matthew Davis auditioned for the role of Travis / Trevor, and was cast, marking his first major film role. Eva Mendes was cast in the role of Vanessa, which had originally been a smaller role, but was expanded to allow her character to be a potential red herring.

=== Filming ===
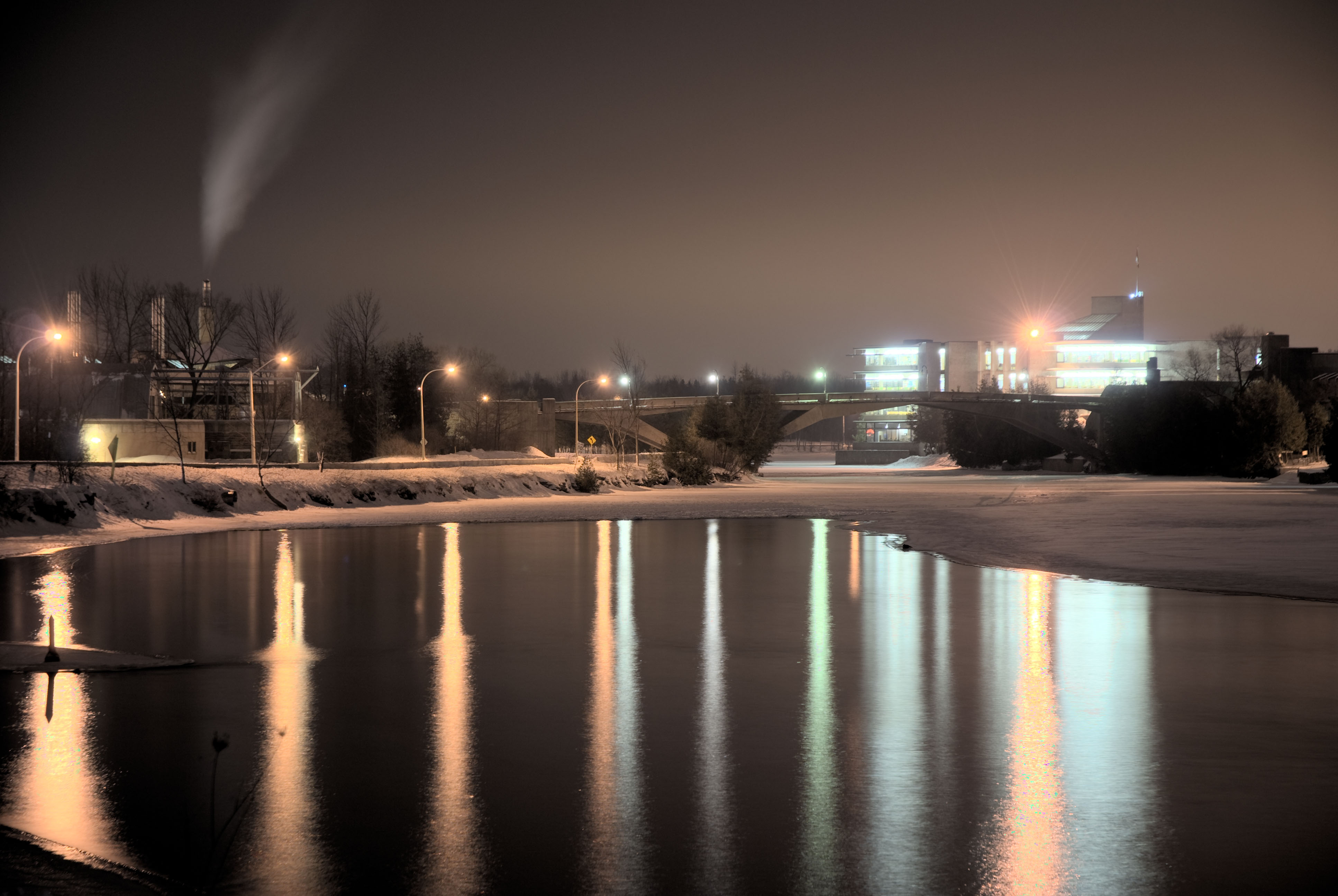
Exterior sequences took place at Trent University in Peterborough, Ontario

Principal photography took place in Toronto, Ontario, Canada over a period of 47 days in the fall of 1999. The film's opening sequence on the airplane, which was shot over a period of three days, was originally written to have occurred on a boat; however, the script was altered last-minute after the production crew came across an airplane set from the film Pushing Tin (1999). Due to the film's low budget, director Ottman chose to make use of the set, and staged the sequence on a plane instead.

The university exteriors featured in the film is Trent University in Peterborough, Ontario, which Ottman chose due to its modern architecture as opposed to Gothic. The bell tower, however, was constructed solely for the film, for $150,000. Interior sequences, however, were filmed in Toronto. The amusement park Ontario Place served as the filming location for the mining amusement ride sequence; the mine ride featured in the film was in fact a log ride that had been drained of its water for the impending winter months, which was re-dressed to appear as a mine-themed ride. Ottman stated that many of the lighting techniques featured in the film – particularly the use of strobe lighting – were inspired by Ridley Scott's Alien (1979) and James Cameron's Aliens (1986).

=== Post-production ===
The sequence featuring Lisa and Trevor at the bar, followed by her death scene, was written and shot in Los Angeles after principal photography had finished, as the film's producers felt the film needed a death sequence earlier on to establish a sense of danger. Originally, the production crew intended to make a fake kidney for the sequence (as the character awakens to find her kidney has been removed), but due to budget and time restraints, opted to use a goat's kidney from a butcher shop. Because a goat kidney is anatomically larger than that of a human, it had to be truncated to reduce its size.

Director Ottman also edited the film, and remarked in the audio commentary on the film's 2001 DVD release that many character interaction sequences were truncated or excised entirely to maintain a quicker pace.

== Intertextuality ==
=== Cinematic allusions ===
With the plot centered on a group of film school students, Urban Legends: Final Cut uses a self-reflexive narrative approach and features numerous references and allusions to cinema and other horror films. The opening sequence on the airplane was inspired by the Twilight Zone episode "Nightmare at 20,000 Feet" (1963). Lisa's abduction sequence in which she is incapacitated with a plastic garment bag in a coat closet is an homage to Black Christmas (1974). (Note: The character of Lisa is attacked with a plastic garment bag and suffocated until unconscious in the film's first murder scene. Similarly, the first murder sequence in Bob Clark's Black Christmas (1974) features an identical death in a closet.)

Film scholar Jim Harper, in his book Legacy of Blood: A Comprehensive Guide to Slasher Movies (2004), cites Urban Legends: Final Cut as a "post Scream slasher" influenced by Italian giallo films, featuring a "distinct Argento influence" present in the film, particularly in its killer's attire. Harper also notes direct references in the film to the work of Alfred Hitchcock as well as Michael Powell's Peeping Tom (1960), which is paid homage in Sandra's filmed murder scene.

=== Urban legends ===
The following urban legends are mentioned or depicted in the film:

- Lisa is drugged at a bar and wakes up in a bath tub of ice, her kidney being removed.
- Amy recounts a legend about students screaming at midnight to relieve tension, causing a brutal assault to go unnoticed. This is later re-enacted in Simon's death.
- Sandra tells of a burrito contaminated with roach eggs, which then hatch inside a girl's nose and of a chicken sandwich containing pus from the chicken's tumor.
- Vanessa warns Travis that cell phones cause cancer.
- The first scene of Amy's film has a girl discovering the corpse of her dog, who supposedly licked her hand at night, in the shower, with the message "Humans can lick too."
- The basis for one of the scenes in Amy's film is a carnival displaying fake corpses in a "Tunnel of Terror". As the carnival moves on, several children are missing and the fake corpses are revealed to be real.
- Sandra's murder is filmed on camera. Her friends think it is a fake murder because there is no body, but it is actually real and filmed in the same fashion as a "snuff film".

== Release ==
=== Home media ===
Urban Legends: Final Cut was released on DVD and VHS by Columbia Pictures Home Entertainment on February 16, 2001. In July 2018, it was announced that Scream Factory would release the film on Blu-ray. It was released on November 20, 2018.

== Reception ==
=== Box office ===
The film brought in $21.4 million in the United States and brought in $17.1 million overseas, bringing its total box office revenue to $38.5 million. The film was considered a moderate success, due to the budget of the film being $14 million. However, the film only grossed about half of what the first film brought in ($72.5 million). Although it did manage to top the box office in its opening weekend, something its predecessor failed to do.

=== Critical response ===
On the review aggregator website Rotten Tomatoes, 11% of 85 critics' reviews are positive, with an average rating of 3.4/10. The website's consensus reads: "This teen horror movie brings nothing new to an already exhausted genre. And it's bad. Really bad." Metacritic, which uses a weighted average, assigned the film a score of 16 out of 100, based on 25 critics, indicating "overwhelming dislike". Audiences polled by CinemaScore gave the film an average grade of "D+" on an A+ to F scale.

Dave Kehr of The New York Times wrote of the film: "[Director] Ottman doesn't have the firm grasp of tone necessary to make his deliberate ambiguities seem other than simple confusion, nor the sense of humor necessary to turn the deliberate cliches into effective satire." Robert Koehler of Variety criticized the film's screenplay for being "[too] stuffed with movie references and jokes," and that it "slavishly follows in lock-step with the prior film's Ten Little Indians-like plot line." Writing for the Los Angeles Times, David Chute wrote: "The coolest single element in the walk-don't-run horror sequel Urban Legends: Final Cut may be its atmospheric setting...[the] concept seems tailor-made for that kind of ingenuity, for a little bit of sly wit and playfulness. Movies like Final Cut are bunker-mentality productions, safe, square and purely functional, like buildings made from poured concrete."

Roger Ebert awarded it two stars out of four, declaring that the movie "makes the fatal mistake... of believing there is still life in the wheezy serial-killer-on-campus formula," although he did concede that the production credits were "slick" and the performances "quite adequate given the (narrow) opportunities of the genre." The BBC echoed this in a review by Michael Thomson, who thought that the meta in-jokes of the murder scenes did not work and that the film "keeps the mediocrity [of the first film] alive as it unleashes yet more unsavoury nonsense." The A.V. Club's Nathan Rabin echoed similar sentiments, writing: "A sequel with the misguided chutzpah to rip off its derivative predecessor, Final Cut proves once again that the self-referential slasher film is every bit as tiresome and devoid of new ideas as the unironic bloodbaths that inspired it in the first place."

=== Accolades ===
Urban Legends: Final Cut was nominated for Saturn Award as the Best Horror Film, and won Teen Choice Award in the Choice Movie: Horror/Thriller category.

== Sequel ==
A sequel titled Urban Legends: Bloody Mary was released in 2005.

== Works cited ==
- Harper, Jim (2004). Legacy of Blood: A Comprehensive Guide to Slasher Movies. United Kingdom: Critical Vision. ISBN 978-1-900486-39-2. OCLC 475680187.
- Ottman, John. Urban Legends: Final Cut (2001). Audio commentary (DVD). Columbia Pictures Home Entertainment.
