= Imaginary Heroes =

- Original poster
- Directed by: Dan Harris
- Written by: Dan Harris
- Produced by: Illana Diamant; Moshe Diamant; Frank Hübner; Art Linson; Gina Resnick; Denise Shaw
- Starring: Sigourney Weaver; Emile Hirsch; Jeff Daniels
- Cinematography: Tim Orr
- Edited by: James Lyons
- Music by: Deborah Lurie
- Distributed by: Sony Pictures Classics
- Release date: December 17, 2004
- Running time: 111 minutes
- Country: United States
- Language: English
- Box office: $291,118

Imaginary Heroes is a 2004 American drama film written and directed by Dan Harris. The film focuses on the traumatic effect the suicide of the elder son has on a suburban family. For her performance in the film, Sigourney Weaver was nominated for a Satellite Award for Best Actress in a Motion Picture, Drama.

== Plot ==
Matt Travis is good-looking, popular, and his school's best competitive swimmer, so everyone is shocked when he inexplicably commits suicide. As the following year unfolds, each member of his family struggles to recover from the tragedy with mixed results.

His mother Sandy tries to keep the lines of communication open with younger son Tim while easing her emotional pain with marijuana. Father Ben, a perfectionist who worshipped Matt as much as he ignored Tim, insists on continuing to place a meal at the dinner table for the dead boy and begins to drink heavily. Eventually, without telling his wife, he takes a leave of absence from work and spends his days lost in reverie on a park bench. Tim, always in the shadows as the smaller, unathletic, less accomplished "other brother," struggles to get through school while trying to resist the recreational drugs his best friend Kyle Dwyer is always offering him and contemplating having sex with classmate Steph Connors. Sister Penny, away at college, dutifully comes home for infrequent visits and tries to help bridge the widening gap between her surviving brother and their parents.

With the passing months, new crises arise and a long-kept secret is revealed, until it is revealed that one family member was aware of Matt's inner turmoil and suicidal thoughts and why nothing was done to help him.

== Cast ==
- Sigourney Weaver as Sandy Travis
- Jeff Daniels as Ben Travis
- Emile Hirsch as Tim Travis
- Michelle Williams as Penny Travis
- Deirdre O'Connell as Marge Dwyer
- Adam LeFevre as Bob Clyde
- Ryan Donowho as Kyle Dwyer
- Kip Pardue as Matt Travis

== Production ==
Screenwriter/director Dan Harris was 22 years old when he sent the script to Bryan Singer, who hired him to work on the screenplays for X2, Superman Returns, and the remake of Logan's Run. Two years later he left Singer to begin pre-production work on Heroes. The film was shot on location in Chatham, Glen Ridge, Montclair, Newark, Wayne, and West Paterson, New Jersey.

== Reception ==
=== Box office ===
Imaginary Heroes premiered at the Cannes Film Market in May 2004 and was shown at the Toronto International Film Festival, the Austin Film Festival, the Chicago International Film Festival, and the Marrakech International Film Festival before opening on two theaters in the United States on December 19, 2004. It earned $4,696 on its opening weekend; at its widest release, it played in only 24 theaters domestically. It eventually grossed $228,767 domestically and $62,351 internationally for a total of $291,118.

=== Critical response ===
On Rotten Tomatoes, Imaginary Heroes holds a 35% rating based on 106 reviews and an average rating of 5.2/10. The site's consensus reads: "Imaginary Heroes is a muddled, melodramatic and unconvincing drama." Metacritic assigned the film a score of 53 out of 100, based on 32 critics, indicating "mixed or average reviews".

Roger Ebert of the Chicago Sun-Times observed, "The film might have been stronger as simply the story of the family trying to heal itself after its tragedy, with the focus on Sandy and Tim. But Harris feels a need to explain everything in terms of melodramatic revelations and surprise developments, right up until the closing scenes. The emotional power of the last act is weakened by the flood of new information. The key revelation right at the end explains a lot, yes, but it comes so late that all it can do is explain. If it had come earlier, it would have had to be dealt with, and those scenes might have been considerable... What remains when the movie is over is the memory of Sandy and Tim talking, and of a mother who loves her son, understands him, and understands herself in a wry but realistic way. The characters deserve a better movie, but they get a pretty good one."

Mick LaSalle of the San Francisco Chronicle said the film "has a strong narrative spine, with interesting and big things happening throughout - an unexpected virtue in a family drama. But this virtue is obscured somewhat by the movie's lack of narrative drive. Writer Dan Harris has written himself a tidy little story, but in directing it, he hasn't sculpted a dynamic drama. To put it in another way, there's a lean, mean 82-minute drama encased in this flabby 112-minute film... What saves Imaginary Heroes is its essential truthfulness about families, which it reveals, not only in the broad movements of its story but in the small details... Sometimes the film's tone wobbles into farce, which is inappropriate, and often the story treads water, as though mimicking, in tone, every somber family film since Ordinary People. But, ultimately, it arrives at an authentic and surprisingly powerful place."

Peter Travers of Rolling Stone rated the film two out of four stars and added, "Sigourney Weaver is a luminous actress with a tough core of intelligence and wit. And Emile Hirsch, who plays her guilt-tormented son, has the talent to sustain a major career. Their scenes together have a warmth that almost makes you forgive Imaginary Heroes... for trying so hard and so futilely to duplicate Ordinary People... What the movie damagingly lacks is a personality of its own."

=== Awards ===
Weaver was nominated for a Satellite Award for Best Actress in a Motion Picture, Drama at the 9th Golden Satellite Awards for her performance.

== Home media ==
The film was released in anamorphic widescreen format on DVD on June 7, 2005. It features an English audio track and subtitles in French. Bonus features include commentary with either Sigourney Weaver or Dan Harris and Emile Hirsch, deleted scenes, and a behind-the-scenes featurette and photo gallery.
