= Michael Dougherty =

American director, screenwriter, and producer

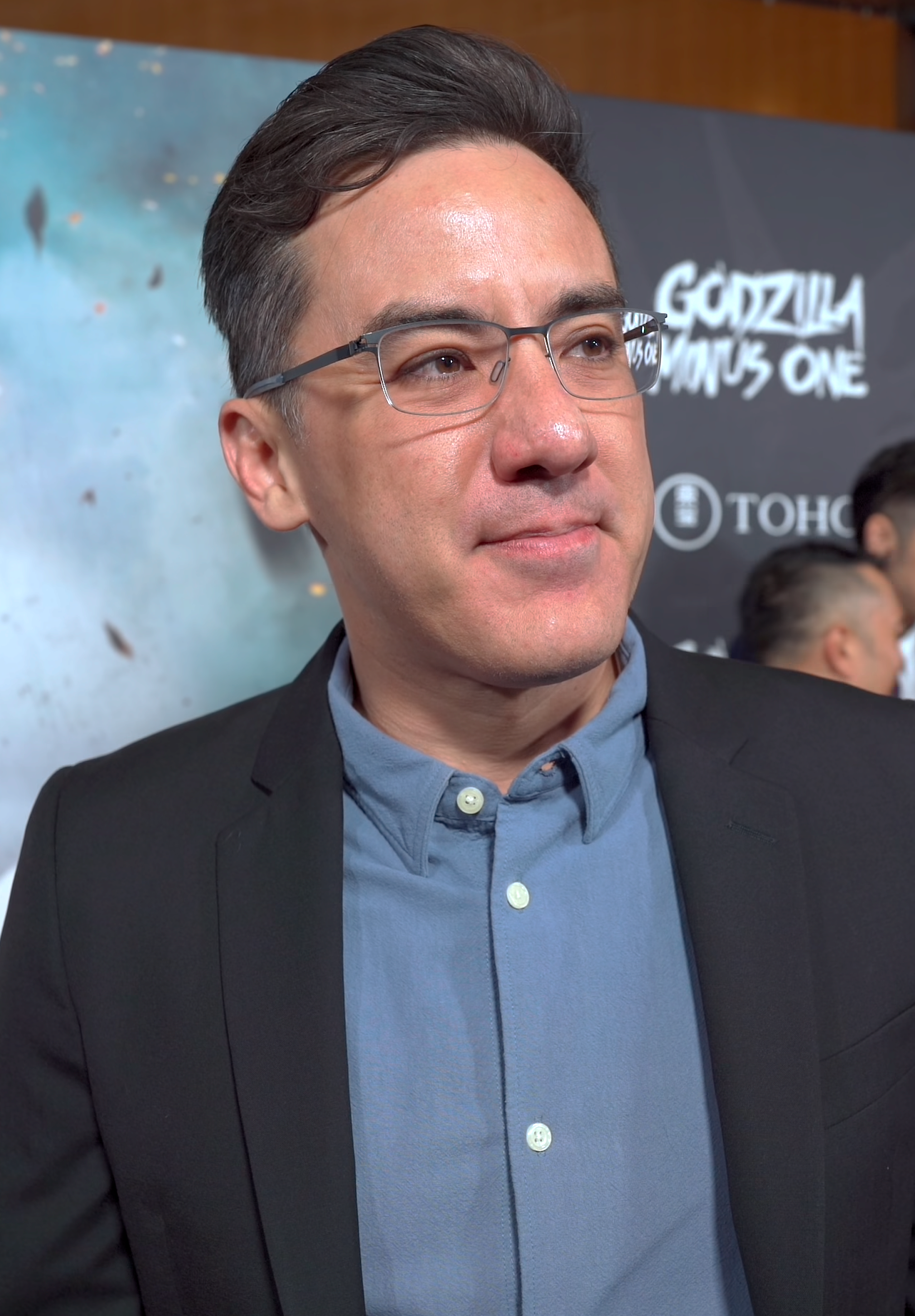
- Dougherty at the Godzilla Minus One premiere in 2023
- Born: Michael Patrick Dougherty; October 28, 1974 (age 51); Columbus, Ohio, U.S.
- Occupations: Film director; screenwriter; producer; comic book creator
- Years active: 1996–present
- Website: mikedougherty.com

Michael Patrick Dougherty (born October 28, 1974) is an American writer, director, animator, and producer known for his work in a variety of genre films, both big and small.

Beginning his career as an animator and illustrator, Dougherty's animated work was featured on MTV, Nickelodeon, and a line of "twisted" greeting cards published by NobleWorks. He then co-wrote the blockbuster films X2 and Superman Returns before making his directorial debut with the horror comedy, Trick ‘r Treat (2007). Dougherty then directed and co-wrote the holiday horror comedy Krampus (2015). Dougherty co-wrote and directed the blockbuster Godzilla: King of the Monsters (2019), and co-wrote the story for its sequel, Godzilla vs. Kong (2021). Collectively, Dougherty's work has grossed over two billion dollars at the box office.

== Early life ==
Dougherty was born and raised in Columbus, Ohio. He attended the Tisch School of Arts at New York University in the Maurice Kanbar Institute of Film and Television, which is where he produced his 1996 short film Season's Greetings.

He is of Vietnamese descent on his mother's side and Irish and Hungarian descent on his father's. He was raised Catholic.

== Career ==
Dougherty made his directorial and writing debut with the animated short film Season's Greetings, which was released in 1996. The hand-drawn short film marked the debut of "Sam", the pint-sized spirit of Halloween who would later become the star of Trick 'r Treat. Michael was also an animator on the Nick Jr. series Blue's Clues and Little Bill at Nick Digital.

Dougherty went on to co-write several screenplays, including the superhero sequel X2, which was released in 2003. He also co-wrote the screenplay for the 2005 supernatural horror film Urban Legends: Bloody Mary, and Superman Returns, which was released in 2006.

Dougherty made his feature directorial debut with the horror anthology film Trick 'r Treat, starring Anna Paquin, Dylan Baker, and Brian Cox. It played at several film festivals, before being released on DVD on October 6, 2009, in the US and Canada. It received acclaim and went on to gain a cult following before finally being released theatrically in October 2022. The short film Season's Greetings, which was the precursor to Trick 'r Treat, was released as a DVD extra and was aired on FEARnet in October 2013 as part of a 24-hour Trick 'r Treat marathon on Halloween. Trick ‘r Treat has since become a perennial favorite that has spawned a growing line of toys, comics, theme park attractions, and Halloween decor, and a sequel is in development with Legendary Pictures.

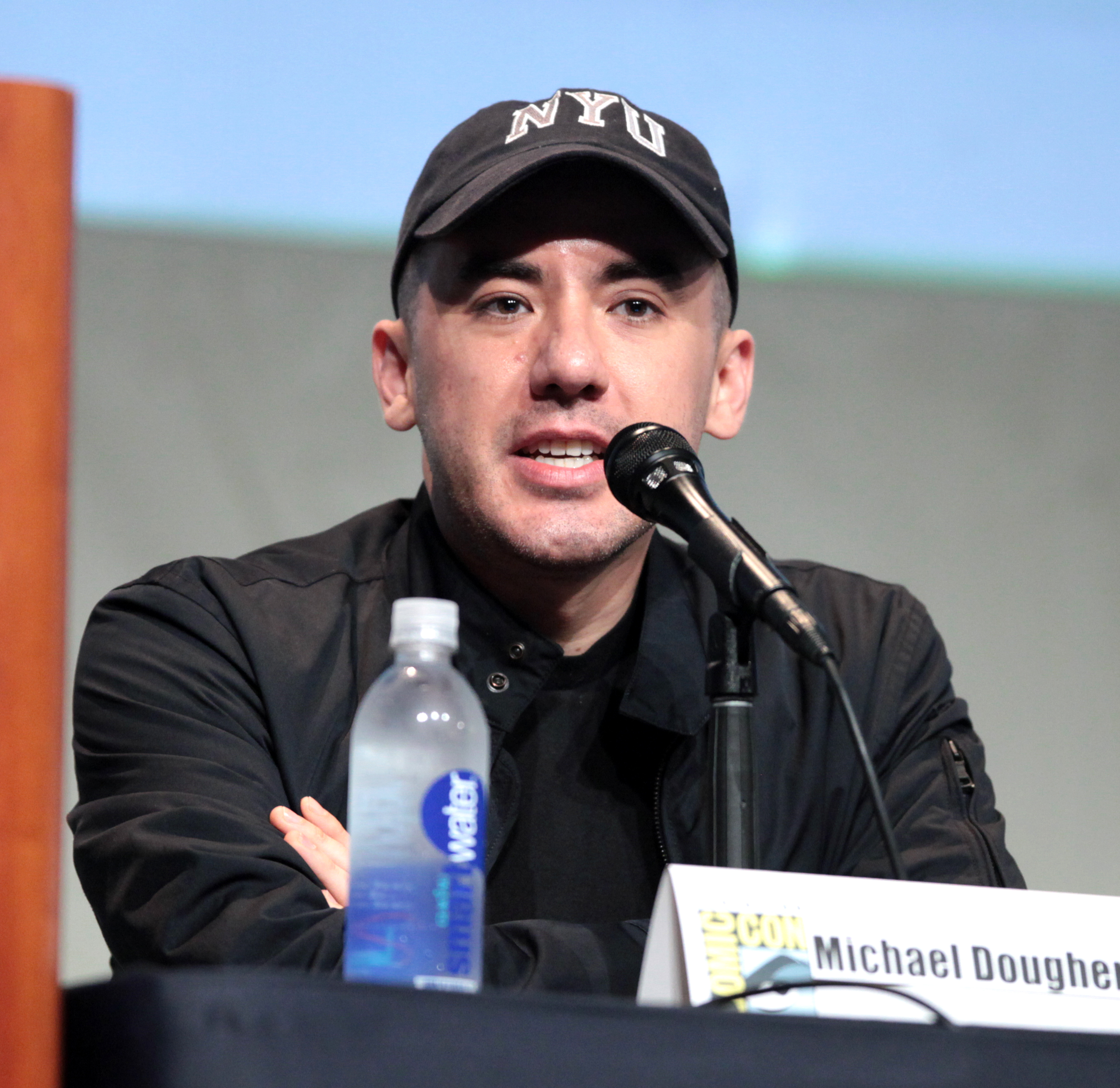
Dougherty at the 2015 San Diego Comic Con

In December 2014, he began work on the holiday horror comedy Krampus, starring Toni Collette, Adam Scott, David Koechner, and Allison Tolman, which was released to moderate critical and commercial success in December 2015. Much like Trick ‘r Treat, Krampus has become an annual holiday classic.

He also co-wrote the story for the film X-Men: Apocalypse (2016). Dougherty directed the science fiction sequel Godzilla: King of the Monsters, for which he wrote the script with Zach Shields, from a story he co-wrote with Shields and Max Borenstein. The film, starring Millie Bobby Brown, Vera Farmiga, and Ken Watanabe, was released in 2019, to mixed reviews; it grossed $386 million worldwide.

In April 2020, HBO was announced to be developing a Hellraiser television series that would serve as "an elevated continuation and expansion" of its mythology, with Mark Verheiden and Dougherty writing and David Gordon Green directing several episodes. The three will executive produce with Danny McBride, Jody Hill, Brandon James and Roy Lee of Vertigo Entertainment.

In September 2020, Clive Barker announced that Dougherty will Direct a television series adaptation of Nightbreed.

Dougherty and Shields provided rewrites for Godzilla vs. Kong, starring Brian Tyree Henry, Rebecca Hall, and Alexander Skarsgård, but only retained a "Story By" credit along with Terry Rossio. Dougherty and Shields provided "additional literary material" for Godzilla x Kong: The New Empire, along with James Ashcroft, Eli Kent, and Nicole Perlman.

In February 2024 Colossal Biosciences announced a Multiyear Docu-series with Dougherty as executive producer.

In September 2026, Dougherty launched Sam: The Soul of Halloween, a website and social media project centred on Sam, the character first introduced in his 1996 animated short film Season's Greetings. The project features plans for new original content, including animated shorts, illustrations and collaborations with artists, alongside merchandise. Its launch coincided with a series of festival and independent cinema screenings of a restored 4K edition of Season's Greetings to mark the short's 30th anniversary.

== Filmography ==
Year	Title	Director	Writer	Producer
2003	X2	No	Yes	No
2005	Urban Legends: Bloody Mary	No	Yes	No
2006	Superman Returns	No	Yes	No
2007	Trick 'r Treat	Yes	Yes	Executive
2015	Krampus	Yes	Yes	Yes
2016	X-Men: Apocalypse	No	Story	No
2019	Godzilla: King of the Monsters	Yes	Yes	No
2021	Godzilla vs. Kong	No	Story	No

Consulting producer

- Monarch: Legacy of Monsters (2023–2026)

== Comic books ==
Dougherty has a long history with comic books, both as a fan and as a writer. Two of his early screenwriting credits, X-Men 2 and Superman Returns were based on the classic Marvel and DC characters, while his original feature films spawned their own graphic novels.

Trick 'r Treat: Days of the Dead (2015)

Co-written with Todd Casey, Zach Shields and Marc Andeyko, Trick 'r Treat: Days of the Dead featured four new short stories, spanning centuries, all of which feature the film's mascot character, Sam. They depict a variety of characters and cultures and how they celebrate Halloween, going back to the holiday's roots in ancient Ireland. Trick 'r Treat: Days of the Dead was a New York Times best seller, debuting at number nine on its list of paperback graphic novels.

Krampus: Shadow of Saint Nicholas (2015)

Published as a tie-in to Krampus, Krampus: Shadow of Saint Nicholas featured three stories which expand the mythology of the Krampus creature, and was co-written by Todd Casey, Zach Shields, and Laura Shields.

Trick 'r Treat: Witching Hours (2026)

Co-written with Todd Casey, Zach Shields, Curtis Waugh and Breehn Burns, Trick 'r Treat: Witching Hours is an original graphic novel that tells four never-before-published stories following everyone’s favorite mischief maker, Sam.

== Accolades ==
Year	Association	Category	Work	Result
1997	Chicago International Film Festival	Student Animated Short	Season's Greetings	Won
2004	Saturn Awards	Best Writing	X2	Nominated
2004	Hugo Awards	Best Dramatic Presentation - Long Form	X2	Nominated
2007	Saturn Awards	Best Writing	Superman Returns	Won
2008	Screamfest Horror Film Festival	Audience Award	Trick 'r Treat	Won
2009	Rondo Hatton Classic Horror Awards	Best Film	Trick 'r Treat	Nominated
2009	Fright Meter Awards	Best Director	Trick 'r Treat	Won
2009	Fright Meter Awards	Best Screenplay	Trick 'r Treat	Nominated
2015	Rondo Hatton Classic Horror Awards	Best Movie	Krampus	Nominated
2016	Horror Society Awards	Best Horror Film	Krampus	Nominated
2016	Fright Meter Awards	Best Director	Krampus	Nominated
2016	Fright Meter Awards	Best Screenplay	Krampus	Nominated
2016	Fangoria Chainsaw Awards	Best Wide-Release Film	Krampus	Nominated
2020	Saturn Awards	Best Fantasy Film	Godzilla: King of the Monsters	Nominated
