= Chris (Friday the 13th) =

Main character in the Friday the 13th series

Chris Higgins
- Friday the 13th character
- Kimmell as Chris
- First appearance: Friday the 13th Part III (1982)
- Created by: Martin Kitrosser; Carol Watson; Petru Popescu
- Portrayed by: Dana Kimmell

In-universe information
- Occupation: College student
- Status: Alive

Chris Higgins is a fictional character in the Friday the 13th franchise. Chris first appears in Friday the 13th Part III (1982) as a young woman visiting a family homestead with friends to overcome trauma. She is portrayed by Dana Kimmell. Writing duo Martin Kitrosser and Carol Watson wrote her as the new protagonist of the series after the previous film Friday the 13th Part 2's lead, Amy Steel, declined to return as Ginny Field. An uncredited Petru Popescu rewrote their script and spent the most time developing Chris—giving her an in-depth background and a past connection to series villain Jason Voorhees (Richard Brooker).

Producers of the film actively sought out Dana Kimmell upon seeing her in the slasher film Sweet Sixteen (1982). A casting agent contacted her and brought her in to Steve Miner, and all she had to do was scream in the audition. Kimmell performed all of her stunts in the film. The character's in-depth background and her characterization of dealing with her trauma have contributed to her being a topic in academic studies for shifting the focus of the villain in horror films to the protagonist. Additionally, Chris is the lead protagonist in the two novelizations based on the third film, Michael Avallone's 1982 and Simon Hawke's 1988 adaptations, each altering her ending.

== Appearances ==
Chris Higgins (Dana Kimmell) appears in the third installment of the twelve Friday the 13th films as a young woman traumatized from an encounter with Jason Voorhees. The books in the expanded universe further explore Chris' story.

=== Film ===
Chris made her cinematic debut in Friday the 13th Part III on August 13, 1982. In this film, Chris is a young woman recovering from trauma who takes a group of friends and acquaintances to the Higgins Haven, her family homestead. Due to her trauma, she distances herself from the group and her boyfriend, Rick Bombay (Paul Kratka). In a monologue sequence, Chris reveals that two years prior, she was assaulted in the nearby woods by a severely disfigured man after a family fight and returned to her family's homestead in an attempt to face her trauma. Soon discovering that everyone is dead, Chris finds herself in a confrontation with her attacker, Jason Voorhees (Richard Brooker). After fending him off, Chris finds herself cornered in her barn. Chris drops from a beam at the top of the barn and temporarily stuns Jason. After knocking him unconscious, she hangs him and hits him in the face with a hatchet. Due to already suffering from prior trauma, the events of the film leave her hysterical.

=== Literature ===
Chris first appeared outside of film in the 1982 novelization of Friday the 13th Part 3 by Michael Avallone; Avallone's novelization, based on the original screenplay, is notably different compared to the film version—which had three different endings that change Chris's fate. Avallone's novel takes different narrative approaches to the character. Avallone features Chris written as a blonde twenty-year old and includes an ending that features Chris decapitating Jason with a sickle in the barn rather than striking him with a hatchet. The novel ends with Chris's original death scene written in as a nightmare sequence. In the nightmare, Chris enters the barn in an attempt to find the missing corpses to prove her sanity to authorities and is decapitated by Jason in the process. Additionally, Chris appears in Simon Hawke's 1988 novelization of the third film which follows the film more closely.

== Development ==
=== Conception ===
“I liked Chris because she fought back, I didn't want her to be a wimp. I wanted her to be someone who could survive — and she did."

— Kimmell discussing Chris

Writers Martin Kitrosser and Carol Watson conceptualized her following Amy Steel's decision to turn down the offer of reprising Ginny Field, the heroine of the prior film Friday the 13th Part 2.

An uncredited Petru Popescu was hired to do additional rewrites featuring the character. Popescu describes rewriting the Chris character to be the most creatively fulfilling as a writer as she had a past he could explore. He found Chris both easy and challenging to write due to this background, and that he spent the most time developing her. The biggest questions asked by the makers surrounding the character were the exact nature of her history with Jason. Early discussions involved a full-fledged rape backstory, although they deemed this too exploitative, and decided to keep her past with Jason ambiguous.

The role of Chris went to actress Dana Kimmell, although she wasn't who the writers of the script envisioned in the role. The television actress had recently led Jim Sotos' feature length slasher film Sweet Sixteen (1983) which caught the attention of Frank Mancuso Jr., the producer of Friday the 13th Part III (1982). He reached out to Kimmell, and she met with a casting director. He brought her to an audition, in which all she had to do was scream, with Mancuso Jr. and director Steve Miner. Due to a scheduling conflict with another project, Kimmell was initially unable to sign on to the film. However, the filmmakers postponed filmmaking until she was available. Kimmell describes the character as "a young college girl who takes her friends up in the mountains." There wasn't a lot of discussion or preparation for her character until she arrived on set to begin shooting. Kimmell has expressed gratitude for the film, stating that "it's by no means a cheap horror film," and described Chris as a "good part."

“It's funny, but apparently, I was interviewed for Fangoria a few years ago, where I talk about these changes I requested in the movie. I honestly don't even remember giving that interview. But I do remember having a meeting with Frank Mancuso, Jr. They had a couple of scenes in there about how Rick and Chris had stayed out all night, and there was a line that they had made love. I said to Frank and Steve Miner, "I'd be a lot more comfortable if we didn't talk about that." And they said, "Just do whatever you want," and rearranged it. I knew this series had a lot of young followers. I just thought it was good not to promote that kind of thing so much. And nobody notices, anyway."

— Kimmell discussing the only things she had changed in the film

18 feet above ground; Kimmell had to do several takes of the barn beam sequence.

Although speculations surfaced that Kimmell pushed for various changes in the movie, Kimmell only recalls expressing discomfort to Mancuso, Jr. about dialogue referencing Chris having sex with her boyfriend Rick. Kimmell states she got permission to alter the lines for this scene as she believed the Friday the 13th series to have a young audience and didn't want the film to be overtly sexual. Costar Tracie Savage states, "Each person took care of themselves. Dana had no say over what was happening. She wouldn't have had that authority. The priority is to scare the hell out of people, and if they have an actress who was concerned about the art, they're going to say, "Sorry, we'll find somebody else."

Kimmell wanted to perform her stunts as there was a lot of free time between takes; it motivated her for her scene work. Kimmell recollects obtaining bruises throughout the shoot from performing Chris's stunts—such as the barn beam scene where she was 18 feet above the ground and had to fall. This sequence had to have several retakes. The original ending of Chris getting decapitated at the hands of Jason Voorhees was scrapped due to the filmmakers finding this ending to be too grim. This ending would have marked the first film in the franchise to feature the protagonist dying.

=== Characterization ===
Film critic Janet Maslin (The New York Times) writes that Chris is the "lone survivor" and by the end of the film, she is left traumatized. Writer Jim Harper wrote that, unlike her peers, Chris is reluctant to engage in sexual activity—because of her past alluding to sexual assault. When discussing the psychological aspects of Chris, scholar Wade Newhouse describes Chris as an exploration of the psychology of a victim—unlike the prior films focus on the killers Pamela Voorhees (Betsy Palmer) and Jason. Newhouse describes her as being set apart from the other characters in the film, attributing it to Chris' self-awareness rather than a morality play. Newhouse highlights her monologue as showing her "in a sense worth saving because her introspection marks her as unique in a world of otherwise generic teenagers."

Similarly, Brennan Thomas characterizes Chris as showing signs of PTSD, emphasizing her as the franchise's most physically and emotionally vulnerable character. Thomas further likens her vulnerability to a post-war Vietnam veteran due to her extensive trauma. Wickham Clayton credits Chris as the first protagonist of the Friday the 13th films to have an in-depth backstory explored. Clayton attributes her backstory and its connected flashback scene that alludes to the possibility of rape by Jason as allowing Chris to have a fully developed character arc that explains her mental breakdown at the end of the film. Clayton argues that the sufficient characterization provided to Chris allows the audience to have an emotional engagement with her wellbeing compared to the heroines of the prior installments.

Tim Dirks describes Chris's confrontation with Jason as a "monumental battle of wits and stamina." Jack Pooley (WhatCulture) describes the character as "annoyingly hysterical" but praises Chris for her resourcefulness during the film's finale. Joan Bunke (Des Moines Tribune) describes Chris as "dim" for the character's decision of returning to the place that traumatized her.

== Popular culture ==
Chris appears as an easter egg in the video game Friday the 13th: The Game (2017) as a figurine players must collect in order to progress in the Virtual Cabin game mode. Writer Stacie Ponder included an illustration of Chris in her 2017 Friday the 13th death count book.

== Works cited ==
- Bracken, Peter (2006). Crystal Lake Memories: The Complete History of Friday the 13th. Titan Books. ISBN 978-1-845-76343-5.
