= 1976 Deauville American Film Festival =

Film festival in France

- Festival poster
- Location: Deauville, France
- Hosted by: Deauville American Film Festival Group
- No. of films: 38 feature films
- Festival date: August 31, 1976–September 5, 1976
- Language: International
- Website: www.festival-deauville.com

The 2nd Deauville American Film Festival took place at Deauville, France from August 31 to September 5, 1976. This year, the festival auctioned film posters of the films screening at the festival, which continued over subsequent years.

The festival was non-competitive in nature and remained so until 1995. The festival introduced Lucien Barrière Prize for Literature, which was awarded every year during the Festival to an American author. The festival contained three different sections in its programme, in which 38 feature films were screened.

== Programme ==
=== America ===
- A Child Is a Wild Young Thing by Peter Skinner
- All Together Now by Randal Kleiser
- Beacon Hill by Fielder Cook and Mel Ferber
- Film About a Woman Who... by Yvonne Rainer
- Gums by Robert J. Kaplan
- Let My Puppets Come by Gerard Damiano
- Loose Ends by David Burton Morris and Victoria Wozniak
- Pleasantville by Ker locker
- Sandstone by Jonathan Dana and Bunny Dana
- Saturday Night at the Baths by David Buckley
- Smash-Up on Interstate 5 by John Llewellyn Moxey
- The Homecoming by Peter Hall
- The UFO Incident by Richard A. Colla
- This Is America by Romano Vanderbes
- Underground by Emile de Antonio, Mary Lampson and Haskell Wexler

=== American cinema overview ===
- Ciao! Manhattan by John Palmer and David Weisman
- Death Play by Arthur Storch
- Emma by John Glenister
- Hollywood Boulevard by Allan Arkush and Joe Dante
- Hearts of the West by Howard Zieff
- Lifeguard by Daniel Petrie
- Mustang: The House That Joe Built by Robert Guralnick
- Sea Marks by Ronald F. Maxwell and Steven Robman
- The Terminal Man by Mike Hodges
- The All American Boy by Charles K. Eastman
- The Bingo Long Traveling All-Stars & Motor Kings by John Badham
- The Challenge... A Tribute to Modern Art by Herbert Kline
- The Last Victim by Jim Sotos
- The River Niger by Krishna Shah
- Tunnel Vision by Neal Israel and Bradley R. Swirnoff

=== Preview ===
- Buffalo Bill and the Indians, or Sitting Bull's History Lesson by Robert Altman
- Death Weekend by William Fruet
- Independence Day by Bobby Roth
- Cry for Me, Billy by William A. Graham
- Mother, Jugs & Speed by Peter Yates
- The Entertainer by Donald Wrye
- The Gentleman Tramp by Richard Patterson
- Jackson County Jail by Mike Miller
- The Sunshine Boys by Herbert Ross
- The Wild Party by James Ivory

== Awards ==
- Lucien Barrière Prize for Literature
  - Crazy in America by Yves Berger
