= Condemned 2: Bloodshot =

2008 video game

- North American cover art
- Developer: Monolith Productions
- Publisher: Sega
- Producers: Dave Hasle; Constantine Hantzopoulos
- Designer: Frank Rooke
- Programmers: Brian Legge; Rick Ellis
- Artists: Matthew Allen; Eric Kohler
- Writer: Frank Rooke
- Composer: Nathan Grigg
- Engine: LithTech Jupiter EX
- Platforms: PlayStation 3; Xbox 360
- Release: Xbox 360: NA: March 11, 2008; AU: March 27, 2008; EU: April 4, 2008; PlayStation 3: NA: March 18, 2008; AU: March 27, 2008; EU: April 4, 2008
- Genres: Survival horror, action, first-person shooter
- Modes: Single-player, multiplayer

Condemned 2: Bloodshot (released as Condemned 2 in Europe and Australia), is a 2008 first-person action and survival horror video game for PlayStation 3 and Xbox 360. Developed by Monolith Productions and published by Sega, it was released for both systems in North America and Australia in March 2008, and in Europe the following month. It is a sequel to the 2005 game Condemned: Criminal Origins.

Set eleven months after the events of the first game, former FBI agent Ethan Thomas has become a violence-prone alcoholic plagued by hallucinations. As violence continues to escalate throughout the city of Metro, Thomas's former colleague, Rosa, elicits his reluctant assistance in tracking down the missing Malcolm Vanhorn. Learning that Leland Vanhorn (aka Serial Killer X) may still be alive, Thomas soon finds himself at the center of a vast conspiracy and must do all he can to evade the powerful cult who want him dead at any cost.

In making Condemned 2, Monolith looked closely at the reception of the first game, focussing on what was popular amongst fans and critics and what was not. With this in mind, they specifically set out to correct the two most frequently criticised elements of the original; the implementation of the forensic tools and the lack of depth in the melee mechanics. At the same time, they attempted to enhance or expand upon every aspect of the original; from the graphics and cutscenes to the AI and overall gameplay and game mechanics. They also hoped to take the story in unexpected directions by making Thomas a much darker figure than in the previous title.

Condemned 2 was well received by critics, who praised the graphics, AI, sound design, atmosphere, the overall improvements to the game from the original Condemned, and, especially, the enhancements to the combat system and the introduction of combos and chain attacks without betraying the core of the original. Critics lauded Monolith for listening to fans and attempting to address their grievances. Common points of criticism included the storyline, an overuse of firearms, and what was perceived as a pointless online multiplayer mode.

== Gameplay ==
Condemned 2: Bloodshot is a psychological thriller with first-person shooter, survival horror, and action elements. There are two main components to the gameplay – combat and investigation.

The game's combat is built primarily around melee; firearms are available but are relatively uncommon (although they are more prevalent than in the first game). Players can acquire melee weapons from their immediate surroundings in several ways; they can be found lying out in the open, they can be forced from the environment (such as pulling a pipe from a wall or snapping off a 2x4), or they can be taken from an enemy. Enemies can also acquire and use any weapon that the player can use, including firearms. Each weapon has its own combination of damage, speed, and range stats; so, for example, an axe may have higher damage and range stats than a pipe, but the pipe may have higher speed. There are three classes of melee weapon; light weapons, heavy weapons, and exotic weapons. Light weapons are fast but weak, and include 2x4s, pipes, signs, electrical conduits, and batons. Heavy weapons are strong but slow, and include sledgehammers, baseball bats, shovels, crowbars, and axes. Exotic weapons are level-specific and include prosthetic arms, gumball machines, exploding dolls, broadswords, and antlers.

The player takes on an enemy in Condemned 2: Bloodshot.

Blocking is an essential component of the game mechanics as the player can only take a few melee hits before dying. A successful block momentarily knocks an enemy off balance, giving the player a chance to attack. The player can also use a quick-kick, which is available at all times; if the player is unarmed, if they are carrying a firearm, or if they are carrying a melee weapon.

The melee combat system differs from the system used in the previous game in several ways. For example, Bloodshot allows for bare-fist hand-to-hand combat. Additionally, the variety of weapons available to the player has been significantly increased, and throwable weapons have been included (including bottles, bricks, and billiard balls). Unlike in the first game, all melee weapons will eventually break after repeated use. The game also features context-sensitive "environmental kills" (such as shoving an enemy's head into a TV or a spiked wall, setting them on fire, impaling them, or throwing them off a balcony).

Another significant difference is that whether fighting with a melee weapon or fighting bare fist, the player can now chain attacks and achieve combos. To perform a chain attack, the player's chain meter must be full, and if so, a chain attack can be initiated at any time, at which point a QTE will begin, which allows the player to chain up to four attacks. Combos can be performed at any time and require a specific sequence of attack types, but if the player takes damage mid-combo, the combo resets and must be restarted.

When using a firearm, as in the first game, each firearm lasts only as long as there are bullets in the current magazine. However, unlike in the first game, the player can now reload their current magazine by picking up spare ammo. The player can also use the butt of any firearm as a melee weapon. The player also has a taser which can be used to temporarily stun a target. This does minimal damage, but it does allow the player to seize the stunned enemy's weapon. However, the taser can only be used a limited number of times before the battery is drained, meaning it cannot be used as a regular substitute for the game's melee weapons.

Initially, the player can carry only one weapon, whether firearm or melee. Later in the game, however, a holster can be unlocked, allowing the player to wield a melee weapon and keep a handgun as a backup weapon. As the game progresses, the holster can be upgraded to hold larger weaponry. A new component to firearm combat is the addition of iron sights aiming. When using an iron sight, the gun will begin to shake and the screen will fade in and out of focus. This is caused by DTs tied to Thomas's alcoholism, and can only be countered by drinking alcohol, which is found throughout each level. Each drink will steady his aim for a limited amount of time.

The overhauled forensic gameplay mechanics in Bloodshot. Here, the player has found evidence and must report back to Rosa. The player has been given five choices from which to choose, only one of which is correct and will unlock the complete dialogue between Thomas and Rosa.

The other primary game mechanic is forensic investigation, which has been overhauled since the first game. Once the player has been alerted that they are in a "study area", they must select the appropriate tool to record and/or collect the evidence. Upon doing so, the player is presented with multiple statements about that evidence and they must pick answers to communicate to Rosa in the lab. For example, the player might need to determine if a wound is an entry or an exit wound, how a blood splatter occurred, whether a body crawled or was dragged, or a cause of death. Picking the correct statements often reveals additional backstory and dialogue and counts towards a better end-of-level ranking, which unlocks upgrades, such as brass knuckles, body armor, and a holster. The player has four forensic tools available to them; a GPS device, a Spectrometer, a Digital camera, and a UV light.

=== Bloodshot Fight Club ===
Available in single-player only, this mode of play puts the player in arena-like environments where they must fight waves of opponents. There are six arenas available: "Practice" (a customisable fight against a never-ending wave of opponents), "Lockdown" (make as many kills as possible in five minutes), Riot Control (using long-range combat only, the player must defend the police), "Streets of Rage" (the player and four AI-controlled allies must defend a building against waves of enemies, the game ends when all five defenders are dead), "Smoke 'Em" (the player must kill as many enemies as quickly as they can) and "Deadly Daycare" (the player must kill 100 exploding dolls).

=== Multiplayer ===
The game's online multiplayer can support up to eight players. There are four game modes;

- "Deathmatch"
- "Team Deathmatch"
- "Bum Rush" – a time-based game of SCU Agents versus Influenced. Two players are randomly selected to be SCU agents and the rest of the players are Influenced. The SCU cannot respawn but they can use guns (which the Influenced cannot), they have more health, and they can kill with one melee hit.
- "Crime Scene" – four Influenced versus four SCU agents; the Influenced must hide two cases of evidence, while the SCU must use their equipment to find and scan the evidence before the timer reaches zero. The SCU can use firearms, whereas the Influenced cannot.

== Plot ==
It is 11 months since the events of Condemned: Criminal Origins. Ethan Thomas has resigned from the FBI and become a violence-prone alcoholic plagued by hallucinations. Meanwhile, the phenomenon causing violence and psychosis amongst Metro's vagrant population has gotten worse, causing riots to breakout throughout the city.

As the game begins, Malcolm Vanhorn is missing and Lt. Rosa convinces a reluctant Thomas to help find him. Narrowing Vanhorn's last location to a derelict hotel, Serial Crimes Unit (SCU) Director Ike Farrell dispatches Thomas, Cmdr. John Dorland, and Sgt. Pierce Le Rue to investigate. They find Vanhorn's mutilated body, and back at SCU, Rosa discovers that the thoracic cavity is exposed and the sternum is missing. She also notes that Vanhorn has unusual vocal cords. She links this back to Thomas's chest x-ray in his personnel file, which would have shown his vocal cords if the area wasn't redacted.

Meanwhile, Mayor Rachel Mars's body is found in Metro Museum, decapitated, with parts of her skin peeled off, and lumps of muscle torn from the bone. Also by her body is a piece of paper with a hand-drawn X. Pointing out that Leland Vanhorn's body was never found, Rosa speculates that perhaps he didn't die, and was nursed back to health by Malcolm until Leland killed him. Thomas also finds blood-stained pieces of metal, which appear to have been ripped from Mars's body.

Finding evidence that Vanhorn recently visited a nature reserve and lodge, Thomas heads there. En route, Farrell contacts him and says, "some of us see you as a threat - the enemy. I see you as an asset, a special tool too great to be wasted. Rememdium." Finding Dorland's men all over the reserve, Thomas sneaks in and finds a computer on which Vanhorn has left him a message. He explains that Thomas's parents were in a cult known as the Oro, but when they left they were killed. Thomas's existence was kept secret from the Oro by Vanhorn but when Leland learned of the Oro, he became obsessed with joining, leading to Thomas's exposure to the cult.

Meanwhile, Rosa informs Thomas that Farrell has disappeared. Thomas finds him held captive by Leland and asks Leland why he killed Malcolm and Mars, to which Leland says, "their bodies possessed the Oro's secret." As Thomas and Farrell leave, they are trapped by Dorland. Farrell sacrifices his own life to save Thomas, saying, "Find the Voice."

As Rosa continues to study the Oro, she learns the group is over three thousand years old, and Oro is short for Oro Invictus which means "Invincible Voice". Their goal involves "Sonic Generation"; sounds that cause paranoia and hallucinations, and for those with a natural tendency for violence to become significantly more violent. Sonic Generation requires a hollow sternum, a higher than normal bone density, and very unique vocal cords, and the resulting sounds can be enhanced with the implantation of metal apparatuses throughout the body. Meanwhile, Thomas learns that "Rememdium" refers to a myth; someone capable of resonating a sound so powerful it can destroy flesh and bone and could potentially wipe out the Oro.

Discovering the secret Oro base from which the sounds are being transmitted to Metro, Thomas heads there and shortly after arriving, realises he can use "The Voice." He battles his way through the Oro members, destroys the sonic machinery, and is confronted by Dorland. He explains that the Oro's motives are "to create hostility, the unwavering desire to fight, to unknowingly become our protectors". Thomas asks what they are protecting against, but Dorland doesn't know. Thomas kills him by using the Voice and escapes in a helicopter with Rosa and Le Rue.

Three hours later, at a press conference to address the violence and social disorder that is now nationwide, the President of the United States receives a note, and upon reading it, has an apparent heart attack. The note reads, "The Remedy is among us!!!" In a post-credits scene, SKX is on an operating table. He says, "I'm ready" and he receives a metal implant in his jaw.

== Development ==
=== Announcement and rating ===
Production on Condemned 2 began in February 2006, just three months after the release of the original game. The press first became aware of the game in March 2007, when Play.com listed it on their website and began taking preorders. Although neither Monolith Productions nor Sega had confirmed the title was in development, Play.com listed a release date of November 30, 2007, with the game selling for £39.99. Sega declined to comment on the authenticity of the listing. Nothing more was heard about the game until May, when Sega and Monolith released a gameplay trailer and formally announced the title for Xbox 360 and PlayStation 3, with a projected release date of early 2008. The game was first shown in demo form at E3 in July.

In June 2007, Manhunt 2 had received an AO rating from the ERSB. At E3 the following month, due to the violent nature of Condemned 2, and wishing to avoid such a rating, producer Constantine Hantzopoulos stated that Monolith had been in contact with the board and had decided to remove several of the more violent environmental kills; "we're working closely with the ESRB to make sure everything goes through okay but there's stuff we've cut already." Examples of cut content included several decapitations, crushing someone's head in a vise, and driving a drill through someone's eye. This close working relationship between Monolith and the ESRB continued throughout the development period. In November, producer David Hasle said, "we're being pro-active about this. Whatever we do we're running by the certification people. If a red flag comes up we're going to address it, we're not going to get to the end and have some big media blow-up."

=== Ethan Thomas ===
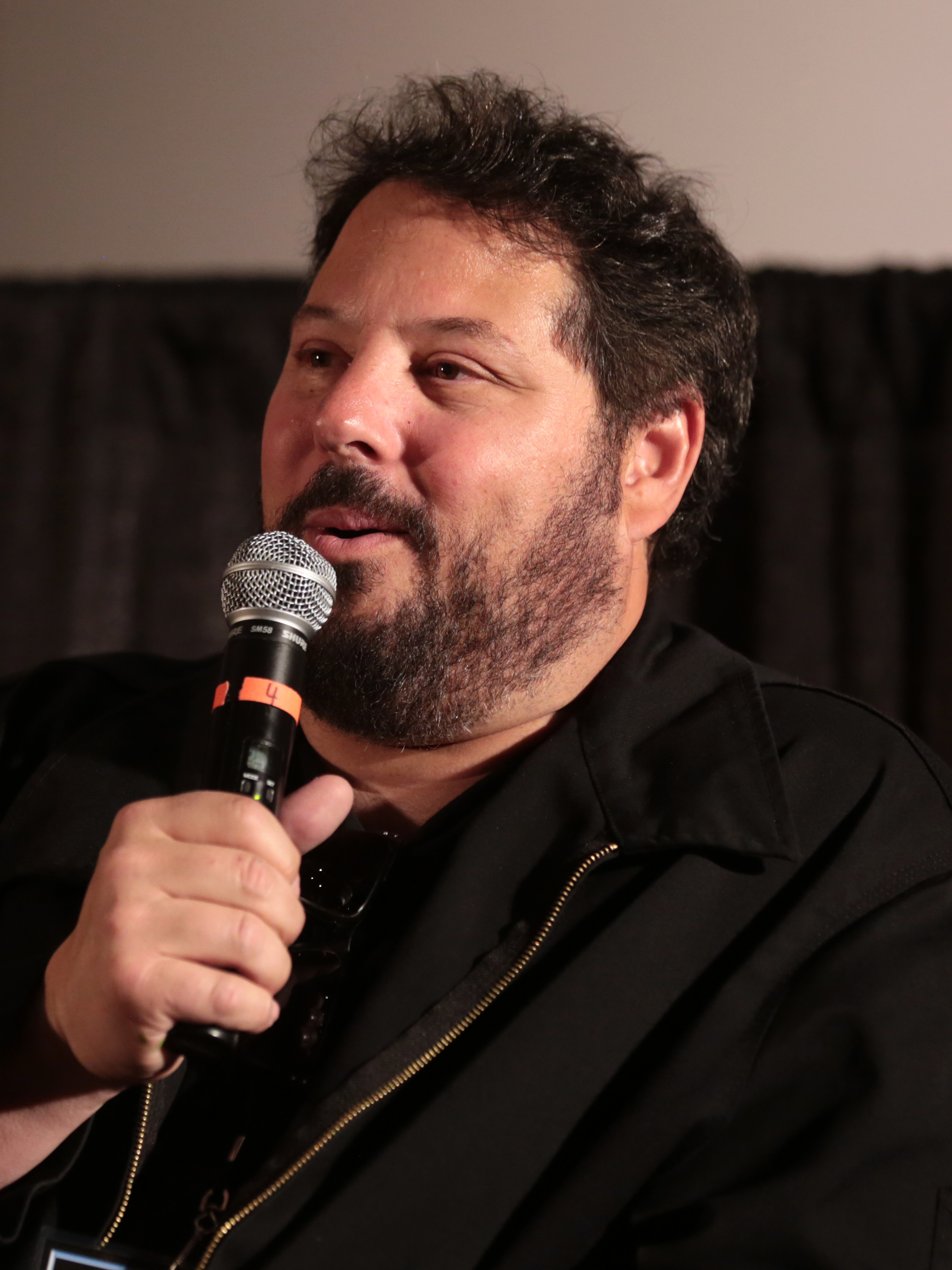
Greg Grunberg (pictured) did not return to voice Ethan Thomas in Condemned 2; instead, Thomas was voiced by André Sogliuzzo, something which many fans were not happy about.

Just prior to E3, Monolith revealed that actor Greg Grunberg would not be reprising his role as Ethan Thomas; instead, Thomas would be voiced by André Sogliuzzo. Hasle assured fans that this was due to the mandates of the material rather than any dissatisfaction with Grunberg's work; "we were very happy with the voice-work he performed for us but we've taken a darker turn with Ethan and wanted to find a voice that better represented that edgy darkness." After fans proved unhappy with the decision to recast the part, Hasle explained,

it was a very, very hard decision. We loved working with Greg and he was excited about working on the game himself. When he found out that we were making Bloodshot, he was the first one to call us up and say, "I'm willing to do it even though Heroes is taking off." But in the end, we had to make that really hard choice about the type of character that Ethan has become. In the first game, Ethan wasn't as hard or dark as he is now and the voice had to go into a new and darker direction.

In 2020, speaking of the changes to Thomas's tone and appearance, writer and lead designer Frank Rooke argued that "the main character's transformation between the first and second games was evolutionary. Who the character was reflected the turmoil of the narrative." He pointed out that "in the first game, Ethan was just discovering the dark world around him. In Condemned 2, he was a bit broken as a result." However, art lead and animator Richard Lico says that the changes to the character was a subject of disagreement; "some felt that Condemned 1's Ethan didn't quite hit the mark and a darker tone was desired for the sequel. But some felt Ethan was too different in Condemned 2."

=== Plot and environments ===
As with the changes to Thomas's character, the evolution of the plot also caused disagreement amongst the designers. According to Rooke, there was a push to fill in the narrative blanks and resolve the open-ended mysteries from the first game. However, "in my opinion, and I feel mostly responsible for this, the result revealed explanations for things that should have remained a mystery."

Unusually, the game's storyline was constructed around the environments, rather than the other way around. Lead level designer Jonathan Stein says that "level theming [...] was more centered around "what environments would be new?" than concern over a cohesive whole [...] after we had our environments, the story was threaded between them." This approach was yet another cause of disagreement; Stein explains, "some – myself included – were concerned that the environment, the story, and the enemies felt schizophrenic, or at least not cohesive."

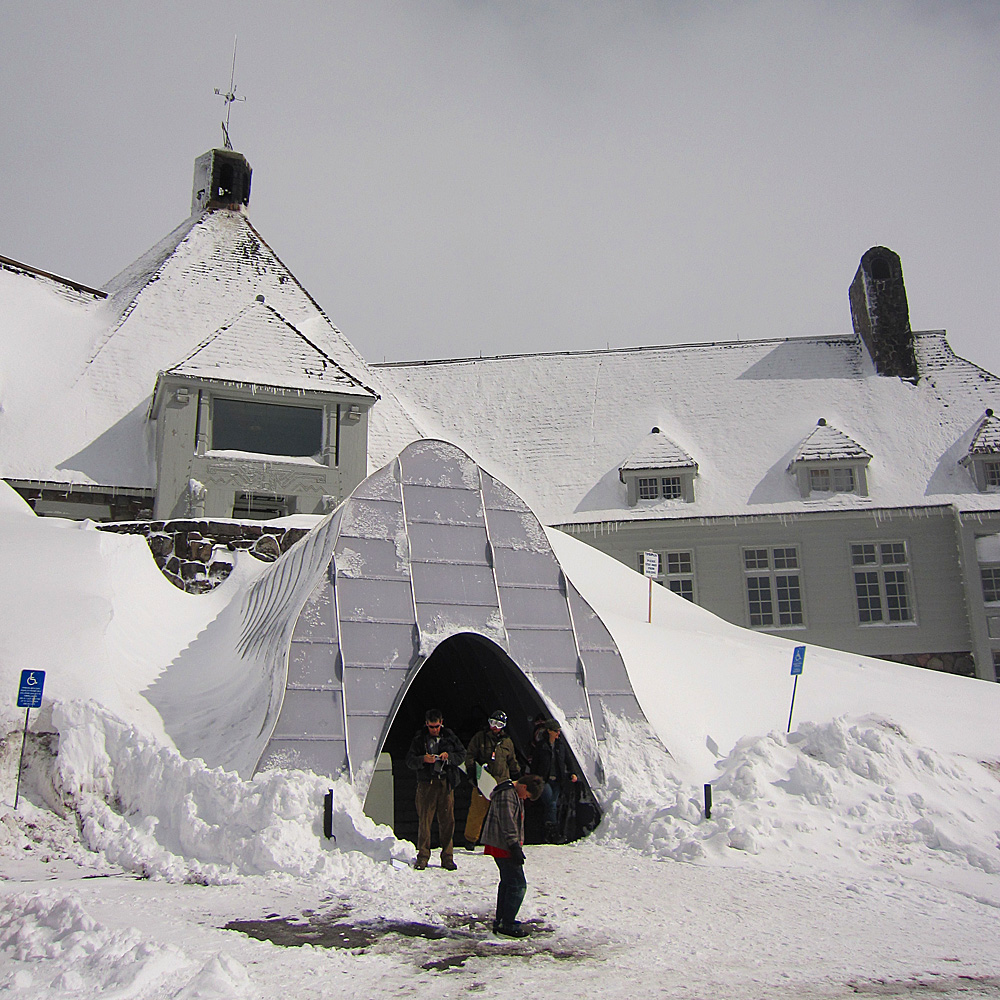
The Timberline Lodge served as inspiration for the lodge seen in the game.

In relation to the environments, as with the first game, the artists had visited various real-world locations, including the Timberline Lodge in winter, a disused boat moored in Ballard, Seattle, the Sunny Jim peanut butter factory in Georgetown, Seattle, and the Satsop Nuclear Power Plant in Grays Harbor County, Washington. In terms of aesthetic influences, the team cite a range of media, including films such as Alex Proyas's Dark City (1998) and Tarsem Singh's The Cell (2000), the Silent Hill games, and the 2002 album Oceanic by ISIS.

=== Design ===
Of the overall design ethos, Rooke said, "the most important element in Condemned 2: Bloodshot is not necessarily a single feature but a philosophy, a goal if you will, to add depth and variety to all facets of the game." Speaking in 2020, he said of the original game, "there were things that we could have done better or expanded upon, which later became the starting point for the sequel."

The team's initial task was to seek out and understand what people had disliked about the first game. Hasle explains, "one thing we did when we decided to make Condemned 2 was to seek out every piece of feedback on the first game we could find and apply that to Bloodshot." Searching forum postings and both critical and user reviews, the team wanted "to determine what the users thought needed to be improved for a sequel." Indeed, so thorough was this process that the "feature list [was] nearly entirely driven from the public's input." Similarly, Stein says, "we devoured every review and forum post after release. Transitioning to the sequel, everyone had a list of improvements to explore."

They found that one area of the first game that was almost universally criticised was the implementation of the forensic tools, and so they decided to completely overhaul not just the mechanics, but the actual purpose, essentially turning the bulk of the forensic tasks into optional side missions. Hasle explains, "unlike the first game, where the player's involvement was mostly about locating evidence rather than deciphering and using deductive reasoning, this time around, the system immerses the player in an investigation."

The other major gameplay element was melee combat, and although fan feedback from the first game was largely positive, the team still wanted to expand the system. Within that, maintaining the feel and tone of the first game was paramount; "we knew we wanted to keep the in-your-face feeling of the melee combat but that we wanted to add several layers and improvements to give depth and choice to the player." Of the game's more complex melee mechanics, which Lico calls "more game-y", particularly the introduction of combos, Rooke clarifies, "realism was never a goal." Similarly, lead character animator Scott Shepherd states, "realism wasn't the goal. We felt with the first one we had the beginnings of something, possibly the best first-person melee combat system out there. We really wanted to continue to develop and expand that into a fully fledged skill based system."

One area of the game that became an example of feature creep was the Bloodshot Fight Club. Originally called Hobo Fight Club, it was created as a simple way for the designers to test various aspects of the gameplay and to allow them to easily demonstrate the game for Sega. It was never intended for release to the public. However, after they realised how much fun they were having using the arenas, the designers decided to make them available in the game. According to Hasle, "it seemed simple enough. But it then quickly grew in June and July to not only a Practice Arena but to also include five different environments with five unique challenges, and a slew of unique UI work that was needed to pull it off."

=== Cutscenes ===
Another area that the team particularly wanted to tackle was the cutscenes. Of the cutscenes in the first game, lead artist Matthew Allen states, "we spent a good amount of time developing a new process to get them into the game with consistent movement and camera animation, all controlled by the animators." However, due to the limited amount of memory, the scenes needed to be rendered real-time, forcing the designers to cut back on "texture resolution and animation fidelity." This led to some of the shots looking pixilated. Another problem was frame rate; "since all of our lighting and shadows are dynamic, being generated real-time, our frame rate is greatly affected by the amount of lights we have in a scene." This again led to compromises with which the team weren't happy.

For the sequel, Allen and cinematic director Rocky Newton decided to pre-render all of the cutscenes in Maya using Mental Ray;

this way we don't have to worry about frame rate, so we can add as many lights and as much shadow-casting geometry as we want, and we also don't have to worry about memory, since we were rendering it on a beefy PC. The memory stuff allowed us to up the resolution on all of the textures.

As they were now using the game engine to render the cinematics, it meant they could use the latest in-game assets for rendering, which freed up time, allowing them to focus on

lighting and tweaking effects rather than moving things into Mental Ray and trying to replicate our in-game shaders. We could also now do a bunch of stuff that the engine can handle, but modern consoles can't - like turning up the real-time velocity-based motion blur, and running with 30 to 40 lights per scene. We can also use a ton of our in-game special effects together: things like depth of field, full-screen color mapping, film grain, sharpen, and a whole host of others, that the consoles aren't powerful enough to use together in real-time.

== Reception ==
Reception

Aggregate score
Aggregator	Score	
Aggregator	PS3	Xbox 360
Metacritic	82/100	80/100

Review scores
Publication	Score	
Publication	PS3	Xbox 360
Destructoid		3/10
Edge		5/10
Eurogamer	8/10	8/10
Game Informer	8.8/10	
GameSpot	8.5/10	8.5/10
GameSpy	3.5/5	3.5/5
IGN	8/10	8/10
Official Xbox Magazine (US)		8/10
PlayStation: The Official Magazine	8/10	
PSM3	8.1/10	

Condemned 2: Bloodshot received "generally favorable reviews", with the Xbox 360 version holding a score of 80 out of 100 on Metacritic, based on 76 reviews, and the PlayStation 3 version holding a score of 82 out of 100, based on 37 reviews.

Game Informer's Ben Reeves scored the PlayStation 3 version 8.75 out of 10, calling it "an atmospheric powerhouse" and "the best survival horror title [of] this generation." He especially praised the combat mechanics and level design, citing the bear chase as one of "the most memorable gaming moments of 2008."

GameSpot's Kevin VanOrd scored the game 8.5 out of 10, praising the "thick, dreadful atmosphere" and citing "the most decrepit and decayed visual design in recent memory." He also praised the sound design, voice acting, score, weapon variety, depth of the combat mechanics, and AI.

PSM3's Andrew Kelly scored the PlayStation 3 version 8.1 out of 10, calling it "incredibly well-designed." He was particularly impressed with how much the character animations and physics enhanced the feeling of combat. On the other hand, he was critical of the shooting mechanics and storyline. He concluded by calling it "one of the best action games on PS3."

Eurogamer's Kristan Reed scored it 8 out of 10, calling it "a one-of-a-kind horror title" and seeing it as "improved in every area" from the first game. He was especially impressed with the atmosphere and environments. He was critical of multiplayer, which he found pointless, but he concluded, "Condemned 2 deserves hearty praise for improving on everything it did first time around."

IGN's Erik Brudvig scored it 8 out of 10, saying it "tackles every criticism levelled at the franchise." He was critical of the "unsatisfying" story and "pointless" multiplayer, but praised the melee combat, sound, graphics, artistic design, and atmosphere.

Official Xbox Magazine's Dan Amrich scored it 8 out of 10, and praised the atmosphere, graphics, and sound, finding it to be an improvement in almost all aspects over the original. Calling the atmosphere "its finest creation", he said that the world "looks disgustingly tangible". He also praised the use of silence for "creating a hyper-aware environment that is terrifying in its lack of ambience." However, he was critical of the "hit and miss" voice acting and the forensic tools.

Edge scored it 5 out of 10, and said that the game had sacrificed the original's tight storyline in favor of violence, in which guns and gore "occur anywhere and everywhere to ever-decreasing effect."

Destructoid's Anthony Burch scored it 3 out of 10. He was impressed with the improvements to the combat system, but little else, arguing that the level design was "irritating" and the gameplay "repetitive." He was heavily critical of the shooting mechanics, the forensic tools, and the changes to Thomas's character. He concluded, "the story sucks, the level design is even worse, and the graphics are grimy to the point of being ridiculous."

=== German ban ===
Due to its violent content, the game was indexed in Germany by the Federal Department for Media Harmful to Young Persons in April 2008. In October, all copies of the game were confiscated because of § 131 StGB, which outlaws the dissemination or public display of media "which describe cruel or otherwise inhuman acts of violence against human beings in a manner which expresses a glorification or rendering harmless of such acts of violence or which represents the cruel or inhuman aspects of the event in a manner which injures human dignity". Although it is not illegal to own the game, it is illegal to distribute it.

== Future ==
In a Facebook post in January 2015, Jace Hall, Monolith co-founder and co-creator of the Condemned concept (as well as the sole owner of the IP), addressed the fact that he is frequently asked about a Condemned 3. Noting that both of the Condemned games sold well, he said, "I am contemplating finding an interested and proven Indie development team so that they can take over the franchise and move it forward."

The following week, after his post received a very positive response, Hall was interviewed by IGN. Asked if he had approached any developers himself, he said, "I have not approached anyone. I have received some inquiries over the last 24 hours. Ultimately I tell them to just send me a proposal for consideration. I place no limiting parameters on the proposal. My desire is to fully empower an indie developer with all the decision-making authority." If the project were to go ahead, he stated,

I believe that the best approach to this is to let a passionate developer do what they do best without interference or limitations imposed by me. Once I decide to grant the rights to a team, they are the boss. I plan on making a real commitment to that. I've developed many games in my career and I know how unpleasant it is to have 'the brand' lording over every design/gameplay decision you are making.

Hall also said that he would not impose any restrictions regarding how funding was raised, or on what platforms the game was to appear. He would not even mandate that it be a full Condemned game;

I am going to grant a license to use the Condemned franchise in general, and the chosen developer will be able to pick what kind of game they want to make. They can choose their vision of the content. They can build up momentum. Perhaps a prequel. Perhaps a simple mobile phone app for starters. It's all on the table. I'm open to hearing new ideas.

Noting that the Condemned game was originally conceived as part of an expanded universe that was never brought to fruition, he pointed out that all the potential for different mediums is still there; "perhaps it would make sense for a mobile app developer to make one kind of game derived from the Condemned universe, and then an entirely different developer create a console game that is Condemned 3. Perhaps while that is happening, some graphic novel artists want to take the franchise and produce a book. There is room here for all these things/ideas."
