= Dana Kimmell =

American actress and model

- Occupation: Actress
- Years active: 1974–2001
- Children: 4

Dana Kimmell is an American actress and model. She is known for her performance as Chris in the Steve Miner-directed 3D horror film Friday the 13th Part III (1982)—which debuted at number one at the United States box office. She also starred as teenaged characters in the slasher film Sweet Sixteen (1982) and the Western film Lone Wolf McQuade (1983).

On television, Kimmell portrayed Dawn Marshall in an episode of the soap opera Another World (1980) before reprising the role in the first season of the spin-off series Texas (1980). She also had guest appearances on series such as Charlie's Angels (1977), Diff'rent Strokes (1981–84), The Facts of Life (1982), Days of Our Lives (1983–84), Hotel (1986), and The Young and the Restless (1984).

== Career ==
=== Early life ===
Dana Kimmell, was born in 1959, the daughter of Dolores and W. Dane Kimmell, grew up in Kingsburg, California, attending primary school until her family moved to Center, Texas. In 1974, she was one of eight girls selected from 20,000 by Teen magazine to model in Hollywood for a week. The following year, the magazine brought her back to appear on a cover. She returned to Kingsburg for her senior year, where she graduated Bullard High School in Fresno as valedictorian of her class in 1977 and signed with Nina Blanchard's modeling agency. Kimmell pursued acting locally, participating in various talent shows and school and church-orientated programs. Kimmell obtained an agent following graduation and made her professional acting debut on the television series Charlie's Angels (1977). Kimmell attended the University of California for two years before dropping out to focus on her acting career.

=== Film career ===
Kimmell made her theatrical debut in Jim Sotos' slasher film Sweet Sixteen (1982). She describes the script she initially read as a "great family-type" film but alleges Sotos persuaded actress Aleisa Shirley into doing nude scenes after filming was complete that earned the film its R Rating. Kimmell's efforts to voice her complaints went unnoticed, with Sotos' asking her to "name one star who has made it without taking her shirt off," which prompted Kimmell to set guidelines for herself when pursuing projects: no nudity and no profanity. An independent film, Kimmell wasn't sure that a major distributor would pick the film up.

Her role in Sweet Sixteen caught the attention of one of the men financing Steve Miner's Friday the 13th Part III (1982). The producer (Frank Mancuso Jr.) and director (Steve Miner) contacted her and asked her to star in the film as Chris Higgins, a character she describes as "a young college girl who takes her friends up in the mountains." Despite generally not liking violence, she has no problems with the violence depicted in Friday the 13th, stating it's not meant to be taken seriously and serves as "shock value" and entertainment for audiences.

I feel television and movies have really gotten out of hand with too much sexuality. They have made sex so common. Women have let themselves be exploited.

— Kimmell discussing sex in film and television.

Kimmell did have issues with certain unnecessary sex scenes. Kimmell has expressed gratitude for the film, stating that "it's by no means a cheap horror film," and described her role as a "good part." The film was a box office success, grossing over $34 million worldwide. Her last film role would be Sally McQuade, Chuck Norris's character's daughter, in Lone Wolf McQuade (1983), another box office success.

After her role in Lone Wolf McQuade, her agent booked her for an audition for the role of Sarah Connor in James Cameron’s science fiction action film The Terminator (1984), which would have had her starring opposite Arnold Schwarzenegger. Retrospectively, Kimmell recalled loving the script; however, she did not like its use of profanity and the inclusion of a sex scene. Based on her previous success in convincing the producer of Friday the 13th Part III to rework the script, Kimmell decided to go to this audition with the same approach. Cameron asked her if she would be willing to do the role, and Kimmell asked him to rewrite the sex scene so that it was removed or depicted off-screen; however, he refused, and she wasn’t cast.

=== Television career ===
Kimmell's most prominent role on television would be Dawn Marshall, "the youngest daughter of the oil and land-rich Marshall family of Houston," in the NBC soap opera Texas for which she is credited for fifty-one episodes. She was selected for the role of Dawn in early 1980, and first portrayed the character in an episode of Another World (1980). Kimmell departed from the show when it was renewed for a second season. Throughout 1977–1988, Kimmell had a nearly decade-long career of guest work in television. She appeared in one episode of Charlie's Angels (1977), Eight Is Enough (1977), Out of the Blue (1979), Bosom Buddies (1981), Code Red (1981), The Facts of Life (1982), Happy Days (1982), Private Benjamin (1982), Fame (1983), Alice (1983), Anatomy of a Scene (1983), The A-Team (1983), Dynasty (1983), Hollywood Beat (1984), Hotel (1986), You Again? (1986), Hunter (1986), and Out of This World (1988). In addition to television series, Kimmell appeared in television films. She appeared in Rivals (1981), Midnight Offerings (1981) as Lily, Return of the Beverly Hillbillies (1981) and By Dawn's Early Light (1990).

== Personal life ==
Kimmell is married and has four children. Her eldest son Cody died in 2021.

Kimmell is a member of The Church of Jesus Christ of Latter-day Saints.

== Filmography ==
=== Film ===
Year	Title	Role	Notes	Ref.
1981	Rivals	Brook		
1982	Friday the 13th Part III	Chris Higgins		
1982	Sweet Sixteen	Marci Burke	Filmed in 1981	
1983	Lone Wolf McQuade	Sally McQuade		
1990	Night Angel	Model		
2013	Crystal Lake Memories: The Complete History of Friday the 13th	Herself	Documentary film	

=== Television ===
Year	Title	Role	Notes	Ref.
1977	His and Hers	Kelly McCabe	Television pilot	
1977	Charlie's Angels	Holly	Episode: "Pretty Angels All in a Row"	
1978	Eight Is Enough	Popular Girl	Episode: "Milk and Sympathy"	
1979	Out of the Blue		Episode: "The Coin of Truth"	
1980	Another World	Dawn Marshall	unknown episodes	
1980	Texas	Dawn Marshall	Contract role, 51 episodes	
1981	Midnight Offerings	Lily	Television film	
1981	Return of the Beverly Hillbillies	2nd Old Maid	Television film	
1981	Bosom Buddies	Susan	Episode: "Reunion"	
1981	Code Red	Lisa Judson	Episode: "The Little Girl Who Cried Fire"	
1981–1984	Diff'rent Strokes	Michelle	3 episodes	
1982	The Facts of Life	Dina Becker	Episode: "New York, New York"	
1982	Happy Days	Carla	Episode: "Tell-Tale Heart"	
1982	Private Benjamin	Bridget	Episode: "Profiles in Courage"	
1982	Hart to Hart	Maureen Tucker	Episode: "A Christmas Hart"	
1983	Fame	Melanie	Episode: "Love is the Question"	
1983	Alice	Girl #1	Episode: "Tommy, the Jailbird"	
1983	Anatomy of a Scene	Herself	Episode: "Girl with the Pearl Earring"	
1983	T.J. Hooker	Susan Folsen / Lisa Telford	2 episodes	
1983	The A-Team	Lane Carter	Episodes: "When You Comin' Back, Range Rider?" (Parts 1 & 2)	
1983–1984	Days of Our Lives	Diane Parker	Unknown episodes	
1984	Dynasty	Emily	Episode: "Fallon"	
1984	Hart to Hart	Susan Wilmott	Episode: "Silent Dance"	
1984	Hollywood Beat	Joeleen Beck	Episode: "Baby Blues"	
1986	Hotel	Denise	Episode: "Recriminations"	
1986	You Again?	Julie	Episode: "Plastic Dream World"	
1986	The Young and the Restless	Stephanie	4 episodes	
1986	Hunter	Jill Tyler	Episode: "From San Francisco with Love"	
1988	Out of This World	Terri	Episode: "The Three Faces of Eve"	
1990	By Dawn's Early Light	Mrs. Tyler	Television film	
