= Chris Higgins =

Chris Higgins may refer to:

- Chris Higgins (academic) (born 1955), vice-chancellor of Durham University
- Chris Higgins (Australian public servant) (1943–1990), Australian public servant
- Chris Higgins (footballer) (born 1985), Scottish footballer, retired; former Queen of the South captain
- Chris Higgins (Friday the 13th), character played by Dana Kimmell in the film Friday the 13th Part III
- Chris Higgins (ice hockey) (born 1983), American NHL ice hockey player
- Chris Higgins (musician) (born 1972), American musician also known as "X-13", former The Offspring touring member
- Christopher P. Higgins (1830–1889), American army captain and businessman
- Christopher Longuet-Higgins (1923–2004), British theoretical chemist and cognitive scientist
