= Friday the 13th Part III =

1982 film by Steve Miner

- Theatrical release poster
- Directed by: Steve Miner
- Written by: Martin Kitrosser; Carol Watson
- Based on: Characters by: Victor Miller; Ron Kurz
- Produced by: Frank Mancuso Jr.
- Starring: Dana Kimmell; Paul Kratka; Richard Brooker
- Cinematography: Gerald Feil
- Edited by: George Hively
- Music by: Harry Manfredini; Michael Zager
- Production companies: Paramount Pictures; Jason Inc.
- Distributed by: Paramount Pictures
- Release date: August 13, 1982
- Running time: 95 minutes
- Country: United States
- Language: English
- Budget: $2.2 million
- Box office: $36.7 million

Friday the 13th Part III (Note: Though marketed with the subtitle Part 3: 3D, the film's copyright and its onscreen title simply use the Roman numeral.) is a 1982 American slasher film directed by Steve Miner, produced by Frank Mancuso Jr., and starring Dana Kimmell, Paul Kratka, and Richard Brooker. It is the sequel to Friday the 13th Part 2 (1981) and the third installment in the Friday the 13th franchise. Set directly after the events of the previous film, the plot follows Chris Higgins, a teenage girl (Kimmell), and her friends who go on a trip to a homestead near Crystal Lake where an injured Jason Voorhees (Brooker) has taken refuge until re-emerging for another killing spree. The film marks the first appearance of Jason's signature hockey mask, which has since become a trademark of both the character and the franchise, as well as an icon in American cinema and the horror genre.

The original storyline was supposed to focus on a post-traumatic Ginny Field from the prior installment. However, this concept was abandoned when actress Amy Steel declined to reprise her role. Martin Kitrosser, a script supervisor on the previous two films, co-wrote the screenplay with Carol Watson. Unlike the previous two installments, Friday the 13th Part III was filmed in California rather than the East Coast. Paramount shot the film in 3D, a choice suggested by Martin Sadoff, an associate of producer Frank Mancuso Jr. The 3D technology used in the film complicated the shooting process, which lasted several months in the spring of 1982.

Friday the 13th Part III was theatrically released in select theaters in 3D, and is the only film in the series to be released in that format. The film was intended to end the series as a trilogy; however, unlike many of its successors, the film did not include a moniker in its title to indicate it as such. The film was theatrically released on August 13, 1982, grossing $36.7 million at the US box office on a budget of $2.2 million, and received negative reviews from critics. It was the first film to remove E.T. the Extra-Terrestrial from the number-one box office spot and became the second highest-grossing horror film of 1982, behind Poltergeist. It has the third most attendance of the Friday the 13th franchise, with approximately 11,762,400 tickets sold. A direct sequel, Friday the 13th: The Final Chapter, was released a year and eight months later.

== Plot ==
Shortly after being sliced with a machete by Ginny Field, (Note: As depicted in Friday the 13th Part 2 (1981)) a badly injured and unmasked Jason Voorhees goes to a lakefront store for a change of clothes. While there, he murders the store owner, Harold, and his wife, Edna. Meanwhile, Chris Higgins and her friends travel to Higgins Haven, her old home on Crystal Lake, for a summer trip. The gang includes pregnant Debbie, her boyfriend Andy, prankster Shelly, his blind date Vera (who does not reciprocate his feelings), and stoners Chuck and Chili. After running into a man named Abel, who warns them to turn back, the gang meets Chris' boyfriend, Rick, at their destination.

At a general store, Shelly and Vera get into a confrontation with three bikers Ali, Fox, and Loco. Shelly gets in the car and knocks down their motorcycles. While the car gets their front window broken with a chain, Shelly returns to knock down the bike again, impressing Vera. Later, the bikers show up at Higgins Haven, where they siphon gas out of the van and attempt to burn the barn down to get even. Jason, who has been hiding inside the barn, murders Fox and Loco each with a pitchfork before beating Ali unconscious. That night, Chris and Rick head out into the woods, where Chris reveals that she was attacked by a deformed man two years prior, which prompted her to leave Crystal Lake in the first place; the main reason that she returned was to confront her fears. Her overall memory of the incident is unclear.

Back at Higgins Haven, a rejected Shelly scares Vera with a hockey mask and then wanders into the barn; Jason emerges wearing Shelly's mask. Vera retrieves Shelly's wallet from under the dock, then is promptly shot in the eye with a speargun. Jason then enters the house and slices a handstanding Andy with a machete. Debbie finishes her shower and rests on a hammock, where Jason thrusts a knife through her chest from beneath. When the power goes out in the house, Chuck goes downstairs to the basement only to be hurled into the fuse box and electrocuted. Chili finds Shelly bleeding to death from a slashed throat, believing it is a joke at first, and Jason impales her with a fire poker.

When Rick's car breaks down, Chris and Rick are forced to walk back to the house, only to find it in disarray. Rick steps outside to search the grounds, but Jason grabs him and crushes his skull with his bare hands, making one of his eyes pop out of its socket. Jason then attacks Chris, who narrowly escapes the house and tries to flee in her van. With the van running out of gas, Chris tries to use the van's reserve tank. However, she runs out of time and the wheel falls through the bridge, prompting Chris to enter the barn to hide, only for Jason to attack again. Inside the barn, Chris strikes Jason over the head with a shovel and hangs him. He regains consciousness and temporarily removes his mask to free himself from the noose, allowing Chris to recognize him as the same man who attacked her two years prior. An awoken Ali tries to attack Jason, but Jason quickly finishes him off. The distraction allows Chris to strike Jason in the head with an axe. He staggers momentarily towards her before finally collapsing. Exhausted, Chris pushes a canoe out into the lake and falls asleep.

Chris has a nightmare of an unmasked Jason running towards her from the house before disappearing, which then cuts to the decomposing body of Pamela Voorhees, (Note: As depicted in Friday the 13th (1980)) with her head attached, emerging from the lake to pull her in. The following morning, the police arrive and escort a traumatized Chris away from Higgins Haven. Jason's body is shown to be still lying in the barn, seemingly dead.

== Cast ==
- Dana Kimmell as Chris Higgins
- Paul Kratka as Rick Bombay
- Tracie Savage as Debbie Klein
- Jeffrey Rogers as Andy Beltrami
- Catherine Parks as Vera Sanchez
- Larry Zerner as Shelly
- David Katims as Chuck Garth
- Rachel Howard as Chili Jachson
- Richard Brooker as Jason Voorhees
- Nick Savage as Ali
- Gloria Charles as Fox
- Kevin O'Brien as Loco
- Terry Ballard as State Trooper
- Anne Gaybis as Cashier
- Cheri Maugans as Edna Hockett
- Terrence McCorry as State Trooper
- Charlie Messenger as State Trooper
- Gianni Standaart as Newswoman
- Steve Susskind as Harold Hockett
- Perla Walter as Mrs. Sanchez
- David Wiley as Abel

Steve Miner, the film's director makes a cameo as a newscaster at the start of the film. (Note: As mentioned in the film's end credits and the documentary film Crystal Lake Memories: The Complete History of Friday the 13th (2013).) Betsy Palmer as Pamela Voorhees, Amy Steel as Ginny Field, John Furey as Paul Holt, and Steve Daskewisz as Jason from Part 2 appear in the film in archive footage and are credited for their "special appearance".

== Themes ==
In his book Legacy of Blood: A Comprehensive Guide to Slasher Movies (2004), the film scholar Jim Harper wrote extensively on the film's final girl character, Chris, who suffers from childhood trauma resulting from sexual assault, which leaves her unable to engage in intimate relationships, although there is no undisputed evidence of what has really happened to her. In the film, Chris' trauma stems from an attack she survived from Jason Voorhees, which leaves her "mentally scarred." According to Jim Harper's interpretation, in comparison to the final girl characters in other contemporaneous slasher films such as Halloween (1978) or A Nightmare on Elm Street (1984), Chris' failure to engage in sexual relations is a function of trauma as opposed to "repress[ion] or dysfunct[ion]."

== Production ==
=== Screenplay ===
Initially, one of the earlier drafts for Part III was Ginny Field (Amy Steel) from the previous film Friday the 13th Part 2 being sent to a psychiatric hospital and confined there. Suffering from the events of Part 2, she eventually finds out that Jason Voorhees survived from his wound and tracks her down to the hospital, murdering the staff and other patients at the hospital. Another proposed concept focused on Ginny who began learning self-defense and returned to college after surviving her ordeal in the previous film. After finding Paul Holt (John Furey)'s corpse inside her dormitory, she and Ted Bowen (Stu Charno) prepare to track down Voorhees and face him in a final confrontation. At the time, Steel turned down the role due to her involvement in other projects, resulting in significant script changes. Steel recalled: "They really wanted me for Part III. They didn't have a script, but they were just going to show me some sort of outline. Then my agents got involved, and I don't know if it was a money issue or a script issue, but I didn't do it."

Screenwriter Ron Kurz, who had written Part 2, was offered to draft a screenplay, but also turned the project down. Husband-and-wife screenwriting duo Martin Kitrosser and Carol Watson instead were hired to write the screenplay for Part III, completing the first draft. Kitrosser had served as a script supervisor on the previous two films. Paramount subsequently brought in Petru Popescu to alter the screenplay and make it "more sinister and menacing." Though the final filmed version of the script contained significant contributions from Popescu, he remained uncredited.

The script for Part III called for Jason to wear a mask to cover his face, having worn a bag over his head in Part 2; this mask would become a trademark for the character, and one instantly recognizable in popular culture in the years to come.

=== Casting ===
Screenwriter Popescu said casting was based on looks rather than talent and recalled that his vision of the characters was at significant odds with the cast chosen by director Steve Miner. Dana Kimmel was cast in the lead role of Chris Higgins after Miner had become aware of her involvement in Sweet Sixteen (1982), another slasher film she had appeared in with Bo Hopkins and Susan Strasberg. Tracie Savage, who had previously worked as a child actor, was offered the role of Debbie Klein through her agent. Larry Zerner was discovered by casting directors while walking along a street and was offered the role of Shelly. For the role of Jason Voorhees, Miner cast British stuntman Richard Brooker.

=== 3D development ===
Georgetown Productions, who had produced the previous two installments in the Friday the 13th series, was initially involved in the pre-production of Part III, agreeing with distributor Paramount Pictures to shoot the film with 3D cameras, making it the first Paramount film produced in 3D since Jivaro in 1954. The decision to shoot the film in 3D was suggested by Martin Jay Sadoff, who had a working relationship with the film's producer, Frank Mancuso Jr.

Paramount leased two 3-Depix cameras from the photography company Marks Polarized Corporation to shoot the film. Simultaneously, Paramount executive Al Lo Presti was researching current 3D camera technology with the intention of developing a 3D lens to be owned and used exclusively by Paramount. The technology used to shoot the film in 3D was developed at a cost of approximately $15 million. According to Sadoff, director Miner and producer Mancuso "didn't give a shit about the 3-D because they were under such a tight schedule. They had to get this film made and, to make matters worse, Paramount told us they wouldn't release the film if the 3-D effects looked stupid. It was a very stressful situation and the whole thing went on right up to the end of filming."

According to a September 1982 issue of Forbes magazine, Sirius II Corp. owner Gale Weaver visited the set of Friday the 13th Part III, reportedly over producer Mancuso's worries that faulty projection lenses at cinemas would prevent the film from having a wide theatrical release. Over a two-week period, Weaver developed a prototype lens that would be adaptable to "almost all theater projectors"; Paramount subsequently awarded Sirius II Corp. $1 million to manufacture the lenses, which would be used in projection—to the exclusion of Marks projection lenses. Marks Polarized Corporation subsequently filed a $25 million lawsuit against Paramount, alleging that the studio was "monopolizing the marketing of 3-D exhibition materials, as well as providing deductions to theaters choosing to lease projection lenses directly from Paramount." Paramount ultimately agreed to credit Marks Polarized Corporation onscreen with the statement: "Filmed utilizing the Marks 3-Depix® Converter," but the company was denied an injunction that would have required Paramount to change its equipment.

=== Filming ===
Jason's original hockey mask was molded from a 1950s Detroit Red Wings hockey mask, and would become a staple for the character for the rest of the series

"The key priority in every scene was making sure that the 3-D effects worked. It didn't matter how the lines were delivered. It didn't matter if we stumbled or fumbled. It didn't matter if our performance was not perfect. We never did a second take... [the 3-D effects] were a very technical, difficult thing to do."

— Tracie Savage on the prioritizing of the film's 3-D effects

Friday the 13th Part III was shot on location at the Valuzet Movie Ranch in Saugus, California between March and May 1982. It was the first film in the series not to be shot on the East coast. The house, barn, and lake featured in the film were all custom-built. The house remained on the ranch lot until it burnt down in 2006. Additional photography for the film's grocery store scenes took place at a small market in Green Valley, California.

Because of the newness of the 3D camera lenses, the shooting process was extensive, with the crew sometimes taking hours to set up a shot, and the cast performing multiple takes of scenes in order for the cinematographer to properly capture the 3D effects. Actor Larry Zerner recalled that perfecting the 3D effects often superseded the actors' performances: "It quickly became clear that most of the time, the performances didn't matter. When we were shooting the scene at the convenience store with the gang members and I had to throw a wallet at the camera, it was, "Hit the camera!" Then, after ten takes it was "Hit the camera, asshole!"" Actress Tracie Savage echoed this sentiment, stating that "it didn't matter how the lines were delivered."

The decision to dress Jason Voorhees in his now-signature hockey mask occurred during a lighting check on set; the film's 3D effects supervisor Martin Sadoff was a hockey fan, and supplied a Detroit Red Wings goaltender mask to Miner. Miner loved the mask, but during test shots found it was too small. Using a technique called VacuForm, makeup effects director Doug White enlarged the mask and created a new mold to work with. After White finished the molds, art director Terry Ballard placed new red triangles on the mask to give it a unique appearance. Holes were also punched into the mask, and the markings were altered, making it different from Sadoff's original template. There were two prosthetic face masks created for Richard Brooker to wear underneath the hockey mask: One mask was composed of approximately 11 different appliances, and took about six hours to apply to Brooker's face; this mask was used for scenes where the hockey mask was removed. In the scenes where the hockey mask is over the face, a simple head mask was created. This one piece mask would simply slip on over Brooker's head, exposing his face but not the rest of his head. The prosthetic masks worn by Booker were inspired by Tom Savini's original prosthetics used in the conclusion of the first film, in which young Jason makes his first appearance.

== Music ==
Friday the 13th Part III

Soundtrack album by Harry Manfredini
- Released: January 13, 2012 (La-La Land); 2016 (Waxworks)
- Recorded: 1982
- Genre: Film score
- Length: 55:19
- Labels: Gramavision, La-La Land, Waxwork

The film's music was composed by Harry Manfredini, who previously composed the scores of the series' first two installments. A disco theme was also included in the film, co-written by Manfredini and Michael Zager, who shared a credit with a fictional band called Hot Ice. The theme was included on releases of the film's soundtrack, and according to Manfredini, became popular at disco and gay clubs at the time.

Upon the release of the third film in 1982, Gramavision Records released an LP album of selected pieces of Manfredini's scores from the first three Friday the 13th films. On January 13, 2012, La-La Land Records released a limited edition 6-CD boxset containing Manfredini's scores from the first six films. It sold out in less than 24 hours. An additional double LP was released by Waxwork Records in 2015, along with other soundtracks in the series. The score was reissued on CD in 2017 alongside Part 2 as a 2-Disc set, using the same 2012 master.

On October 10, 2023, La-La Land Records released an expanded edition titled "The Ultimate Cut", remastered from the original source tapes and featuring cues not heard or used in the final film, along with the extended version of the opening theme, titled "Rock Bottom".

== Release ==
=== Theatrical ===
Friday the 13th Part III was released theatrically in the United States on Friday, August 13, 1982. To promote the film, Paramount launched a $3 million marketing campaign. It was the first-ever 3D film to receive a wide domestic release, opening on 1,079 screens in the United States. Of these screens, 813 were 3D capable, while the remainder consisted of drive-in theaters which were unable to accommodate the format. In order to allow non-3D-capable theaters to screen the film, Paramount completed a seven-week-long conversion process that cost $2 million, "an amount equal to the picture's entire negative cost."

The film was released internationally later in the year, premiering in Argentina on October 28, 1982, followed by France in February 1983. It was later released in Sweden in April 1985.

=== Home media ===
Friday the 13th Part III was first made available on home video on VHS in 1983 by Paramount Home Entertainment. It was also released on CED VideoDisc, LaserDisc, and Betamax. The film was reissued by Paramount on VHS in the fall of 1988, and again on September 28, 1994.

Paramount later issued a DVD edition, with the film presented only in standard 2D form, on October 17, 2000. The 2D version was subsequently included in a box set, titled From Crystal Lake to Manhattan, released in 2004, and featuring the first eight films in the series; this disc features an audio commentary track with several cast members, moderated by historian Peter Bracke.

The 3D version of the film was eventually released on DVD by Paramount in February 2009, and included two pairs of cyan and red (anaglyph 3D) glasses. In June of that year, a "Deluxe Edition" Blu-ray edition (which includes both the 2D and 3D versions) was released, also with two pairs of cyan and red 3D glasses designed to look like Jason's mask.

The film was included in a further three Blu-ray sets: Friday the 13th: The Complete Collection released in 2013, Friday the 13th: 8-Movie Collection in 2018 and Shout! Factory's Friday the 13th Collection: Deluxe Edition in 2020 with 4K scan of the original camera negative.

== Reception ==
=== Box office ===
The film grossed $9,406,522 in its opening weekend and broke the opening horror film record held by Friday the 13th (1980). Domestically, the film made a total of $36.7 million. It placed number 21 on the list of the top-grossing films of 1982, facing strong competition from other high-profile horror releases such as Poltergeist, Creepshow, The Thing, Halloween III: Season of the Witch, The Slumber Party Massacre, X-Ray, Visiting Hours, Amityville II: The Possession, The Beast Within, Cat People and Venom. As of 2020, it still stands as the fourth highest-grossing film in the Friday the 13th series and the third best selling in ticket sales; with approximately 11,762,400 tickets sold, it is surpassed only by the 1980 original with 14,778,700 tickets and Freddy vs. Jason with 13,701,900 tickets. The film also stands as the tenth highest-grossing R-rated film of 1982, the second-highest grossing horror film of 1982, and the sixth largest box office opening of 1982.

=== Critical response ===
On the review aggregator website Rotten Tomatoes, 17% of 106 critics' reviews are positive. The website's consensus reads: "3D effects add a certain funhouse novelty to its stalk-and-slash formula, yet Friday the 13th Part III manages to wind up as a cruder, even more witless variation of its predecessors." Metacritic, which uses a weighted average, assigned the film a score of 30 out of 100, based on 7 critics, indicating "generally unfavorable" reviews. Audiences polled by CinemaScore gave the film an average grade of "B-" on an A+ to F scale.

While criticizing the plot for being derivative, in a mixed review for The New York Times, film critic Janet Maslin praised the acting of Kimmell, Savage, Jeffrey Rogers, and Catherine Parks, in which she called a major improvement to the acting in the predecessors, and wrote that Miner's use of 3D filmmaking was innovative and the most professional effort when compared to other films released at the time, stating: "As in each of the other recent 3-D movies, of which this is easily the most professional, there is a lot of time devoted to trying out the gimmick. Titles loom toward you. Yo-yos spin. Popcorn bounces. Snakes dart toward the camera and strike. Eventually, the novelty wears off, and what remains is the now-familiar spectacle of nice, dumb kids being lopped, chopped and perforated." She also felt the film was superior to the prior two films in the series.

Writing for the Los Angeles Times, Linda Gross wrote: "Ironically, Friday the 13th Part 3 is so terrible that Friday the 13th Part 1 and Friday the 13th Part 2 don't seem so bad." Richard Schickel of Time magazine wrote: "Maybe all sequels should be made in 3-D... It is all so gruesome that horror turns to humor and fun comes from the appreciation of being cleverly conned by Steve Miner. The way the eyeball of one of Jason's victims pops out of his skull and seems to sail over the audience's head is alone worth buying a ticket and putting on funny glasses." Gene Siskel praised the film's "impressive" 3D effects, particularly in the opening credits, also noting its slowburn approach, as the "heavy-duty slaughter doesn't come until one hour into the film," but criticized it for "lingering over the impending deaths of the young women, who are stalked by the camera so we find ourselves in the revolting position of stalking them too."

The entertainment-trade magazine Variety provided a general consensus, stating, "Friday the 13th was dreadful and took in more than $17 million. Friday the 13th Part 2 was just as bad and took in more than $10 million. Friday the 13th Part 3 is terrible, too." The magazine added, "There are some dandy 3-D sequences, however, of a yo-yo going up and down and popcorn popping." Similarly, TV Guide awarded the film one out of five stars, writing that it "exploits precisely the same formula plot as its predecessors, though the gore is a bit deemphasized, with the special-effects crew concentrating on the nicely done 3-D depth work for a change. It's still trash, however, and also made a ridiculous amount of money."

Ted Mahar of The Oregonian felt that the film's 3D effects were a gimmick that compromised the film's integrity, describing it as "a machine-tooled industrial product made to precise specifications, according to a formula derived from observation and experience, for an absolutely dependable consumer."

=== Accolades ===
The film is recognized by American Film Institute in these lists:

- 2003: AFI's 100 Years...100 Heroes & Villains:
  - Jason Voorhees – Nominated Villain

== Legacy ==
Friday the 13th Part III has been most noted for its introduction of villain Jason's hockey mask disguise, which was replicated in the following numerous sequels and became an iconic image in American cinema and the horror genre. Film scholar Carol Clover notes that the film has historically been cited as one of the most violent of the series, with a total of fourteen murder sequences. For his appearance in the film, Jason Voorhees was nominated for AFI's 100 Years...100 Heroes & Villains as one of the Top 50 Villains. Meslow cites the film's 3D effects as paving the way for later horror films which also used the technique.

== Novelizations ==
The film was novelized twice. The first adaptation was written by Michael Avallone and published in 1982 to coincide with the release of the film, while the second was published in 1988 by Signet. The latter novelization was written by Simon Hawke, who had previously written novelizations for the first, second, and sixth installments in the series.

== Sources ==
- Benshoff, Harry M., ed. (2017). A Companion to the Horror Film. Chichester, England: John Wiley & Sons. ISBN 978-1-119-33501-6.
- Bracke, Peter (2006). Crystal Lake Memories: The Complete History of Friday The 13th (First ed.). Los Angeles, California: Titan Books. ISBN 978-1-845-76343-5.
- Clover, Carol J. (2015). "Her Body, Himself: Gender in the Slasher Film". In Grant, Barry Keith (ed.). The Dread of Difference: Gender and the Horror Film (Second ed.). Austin: University of Texas Press. pp. 68–115. ISBN 978-0-292-77245-8.
- Grove, David (2005). Making Friday the 13th: The Legend of Camp Blood. London, England: FAB Press. ISBN 1-903254-31-0.
- Harper, Jim (2004). Legacy of Blood: A Comprehensive Guide to Slasher Movies. Manchester, England: Critical Vision. ISBN 978-1-900-48639-2.
- Hayes, R. M. (1998). 3-D Movies: A History and Filmography of Stereoscopic Cinema (Second ed.). Jefferson, North Carolina: McFarland & Company. pp. 96–97. ISBN 978-0-786-40578-7.
- Heller-Nicholas, Alexandra (2019). Masks in Horror Cinema: Eyes Without Faces. Cardiff, Wales: University of Wales Press. ISBN 978-1-786-83497-3.
- Lentz, Harris M. (2001). Science Fiction, Horror & Fantasy Film and Television Credits: Filmography (Second ed.). Jefferson, North Carolina: McFarland & Company. ISBN 978-0-786-40951-8.
- Muir, John Kenneth (2011). Horror Films of the 1980s. Vol. 1. Jefferson, North Carolina: McFarland & Company. ISBN 978-0-786-45501-0.
- Weinstock, Jeffrey Andrew, ed. (2016). The Ashgate Encyclopedia of Literary and Cinematic Monsters. New York City, New York: Routledge. ISBN 978-1-317-04426-0.
