= Sunny Jim =

Sunny Jim may refer to:

== Advertising mascots ==
- a cartoon character created to promote Force cereal
- Sunny Jim (peanut butter)

== Nickname ==
- Jim Bottomley (1900–1959), American baseball player.
- James Callaghan, Prime Minister of the United Kingdom 1976-1979
- Sunny Jim Fitzsimmons (1874–1966), thoroughbred horse trainer
- James Joyce (1882-1941), Irish writer
- James Mackay (cricketer) (1880–1953), Australian cricketer
- James Rolph (1869–1934), American politician.
- James S. Sherman (1855-1912), Vice-President of the United States
- James Young (footballer, born 1882) of Celtic FC (1882–1922)
- Alexander Vandegrift, 18th Commandant of the U.S. Marine Corps

== Other uses ==
- Sunny Jim's Sea Cave in La Jolla, California
- A character in the David Lynch film The Elephant Man
- A character in the 2017 David Lynch television series Twin Peaks
- A character in the 1968 film Coogan's Bluff
- A character in Lobo web series.
- Sonny Crockett of Miami Vice has a legal first name of James, and is frequently and even officially referred to as "Sonny James Crockett".
