= Catherine Parks =

American actress

- Born: Orlando, Florida, U.S.
- Occupation: Actress
- Years active: 1981–present

Catherine Parks is an American actress who has starred in movies and on television. She is perhaps best known for her roles in the 1982 horror movie Friday the 13th Part III, as Vera Sanchez, and the 1989 comedy Weekend at Bernie's.

Parks was born in Orlando, Florida and grew up in Tampa, Florida. She graduated from Leto High School and attended University of South Florida where she was a theater major.

Parks began doing beauty pageants while still residing in Florida, winning Miss Hillsborough County and Miss Florida before becoming a runner-up in the Miss America 1978 pageant.

She received her Screen Actors Guild card after she appeared in the film Looker.

She has appeared on television shows, her first being Behind the Screen, and she later had a recurring role on the short-lived CBS series Zorro and Son in 1983. Parks has made guest appearances on TV shows such as The Love Boat, Three's Company, Mickey Spillane's Mike Hammer, Street Hawk, Tales from the Darkside, Hunter, and Empty Nest.

== Filmography ==
Film
Year	Title	Role	Notes
1981	Looker	Jan	
1982	Friday the 13th Part III	Vera Sanchez	
1989	Weekend at Bernie's	Tina	
1993	Aspen Extreme	Karen	
2013	Crystal Lake Memories: The Complete History of Friday the 13th	Herself	Documentary film

Television
Year	Title	Role	Notes
1981	Behind the Screen	Sally Dundee	TV series
1982	The Love Boat	Carole Struckland	Episode: "A Dress to Remember"
1982	Three's Company	Susan (uncredited)	Episode: "Extra, Extra"
1982	Days of Our Lives	Mitzi Rummley	TV series
1983	Zorro and Son	Señorita Anita	3 episodes
1984	The New Mike Hammer	Rachel	Episode: "Hot Ice"
1985	Street Hawk	Simkins' Daughter	Episode: "Follow the Yellow Gold Road"
1986	Tales from the Darkside	Gina Casavin	Episode: "The Casavin Curse"
1989	Hunter	Bonnie Arlington	Episode: "Blood Line"
1989	Quantum Leap	Lady in Park	Episode: "The Americanization of Machiko"
1989	Empty Nest	Mrs. Harte	Episode: "Overdue for a Job"
1990	Capital News	Brooke Bros	Episode: "Pilot"; Episode: "Swanns and Drakes"
1991	The Man in the Family	Christina Minetti	Episode: "Once Bitten..."
1993	Body of Influence	Helen	Video
2009	His Name Was Jason: 30 Years of Friday the 13th	Herself	Documentary film
