= Richard Brooker (actor) =

British actor and stuntman (1954–2013)

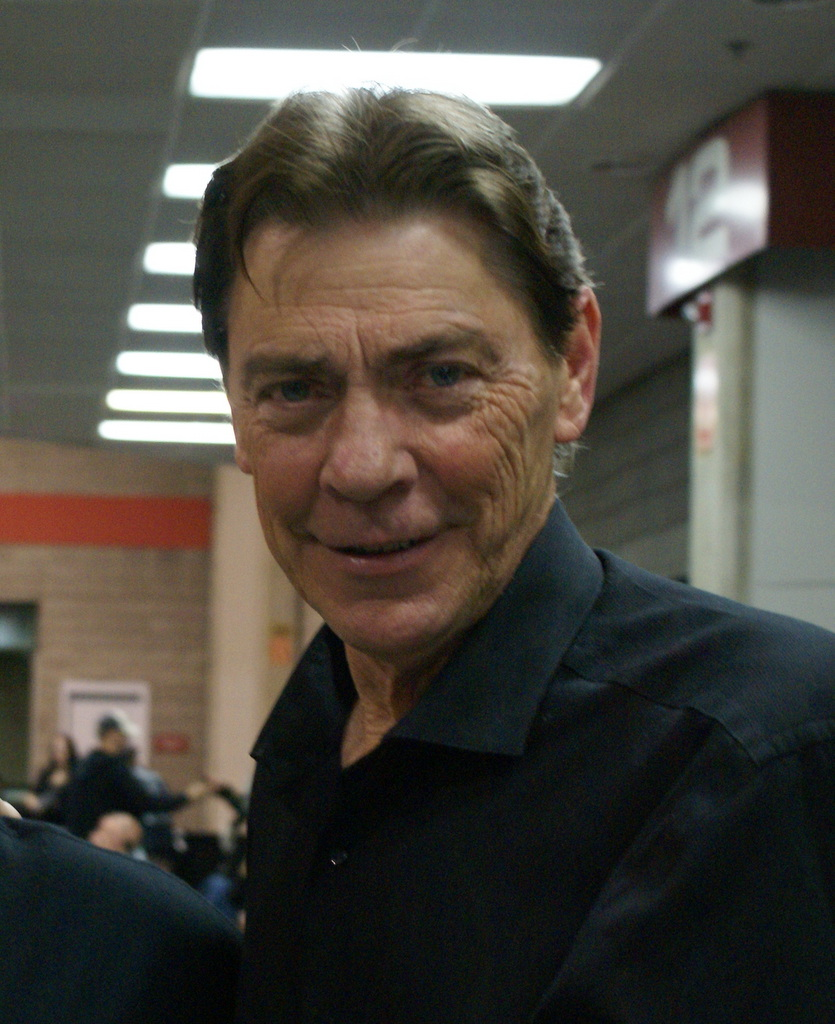
- Richard Brooker at the 2013 Full Moon Tattoo & Horror Festival in Nashville, Tennessee
- Born: 20 November 1954; Münster, West Germany
- Died: 8 April 2013 (aged 58); London, England
- Occupations: Stuntman, trapeze artist, actor, director, producer, businessman
- Years active: 1957–2013

Richard Brooker (20 November 1954 – 8 April 2013) was a British actor and stuntman, best known for his role in Friday the 13th Part III as Jason Voorhees.

== Career ==
Brooker, a former trapeze artist, started his career in acting in a casting magazine, "Dramalogue". The casting call was for a big man to play a role in an upcoming movie directed by Steve Miner; however it wasn't until after Richard's tryout that he found out it was for the role of Jason Voorhees in Friday the 13th: Part III. During filming of the series, Richard had to undergo hours of makeup work to play the role of Jason, as depicted in online photographs. According to the fan-made documentary, Friday the 13th Part III: The Memoriam Documentary, Brooker was at this point in the series the fittest Jason to be played.

Notably, he is the first actor to don the now iconic hockey mask as Jason, which would later become the series trademark. He did all his own stunts and wore blue jeans and a sweatshirt for the duration of filming. Brooker also wore white foam padding under his sweatshirt throughout filming to give him a more stocky appearance due to Brooker's slim and toned body.

After his iconic role as Jason in Friday the 13th Part III, he made appearances in small film roles such as Deathstalker, Deep Sea Conspiracy, and the television series Trapper John, M.D.. Brooker later became a director for such notable series such as Bill Nye the Science Guy, and worked as producer on several sports channels and programs such as Fox and 20th Century FOX. He later shifted from filmmaking and acting to business, creating his own website design company, Production Access Network.

Brooker had also patented a device that is used in mobile phone devices and in the movie industry, which led him to win the Primetime Emmy Award for Outstanding Achievement in Engineering Development in 2006.

== Personal life ==
He was in a relationship with Shannon McMurray from 1995 to 2000, with whom he had two daughters, Madison and Cameron. The two amicably split in mid-2000.

He also had a passion for riding horses and the sport of Polo. Also had an avid passion for sailing, and for a time lived on his sail boat with his daughters.

Brooker frequently appeared at horror conventions across the United States during the 2000s and 2010s, where he participated in autograph signings and photo opportunities with attendees. During this period, he developed professional relationships with other actors who portrayed Jason Voorhees, including Warrington Gillette, Ted White, C.J. Graham, Dick Wieand and Kane Hodder; as well as well as with various cast members from the Friday the 13th film series.

His last convention appearance was in March 2013 at the Full Moon Tattoo and Horror Festival in Nashville, TN.

== Death ==
Richard Brooker died of a suspected heart attack (the cause of death was later found to be undetermined) on 8 April 2013 at a hospital in London, England at age 58; less than one month after his final convention appearance. His name appeared in episode 7 of Hell's Kitchen's 11th season, which paid tribute to him at the end of its 18 April 2013 broadcast.

On 26 May 2017, Friday the 13th: The Game was released as a digital copy in the United States and certain parts of the world. Though Part III Jason's motion capture work was done by Jason Veteran Kane Hodder, the image of Jason's face behind the mask was of Brooker's likeness as Jason; paying homage to his contribution to the series.

On 13 January 2018 a fan-made documentary entitled Friday the 13th Part III: The Memoriam Documentary was published on YouTube. In the documentary, Brooker was memorialized by the people he worked with on the set of Friday the 13th Part III and remembered by friends and a cousin as a caring man who loved his fans and the people he worked with. Dick Wieand, who played Roy Burns in Friday the 13th: A New Beginning ended Brooker's tribute with: "He was one of the good guys, and I am glad to have known him. And if I ever saw him again I’d say: ‘Hey Richard, I know this little bar down in Santa Monica. Let’s go have a drink."

The documentary included interviews with Friday the 13th Part III stars David Katims, Larry Zerner, and Paul Kratka. Also interviewed was Adrienne King, actresses Eileen Dietz, Tracie Savage, Caroline Williams; as well as C.J. Graham and Dick Wieand the men who played Jason in Part VI and Part V respectively. The documentary was dedicated in Brooker's memory.

== Filmography ==
- 1982: Friday the 13th Part III as Jason Voorhees
- 1983: Deathstalker as Oghris
- 1984: Trapper John, M.D. (TV Series) as Vic
- 1987: Deep Sea Conspiracy as Leon (final film role)
- 2009: His Name Was Jason: 30 Years of Friday the 13th (Documentary film) as Himself
- 2013: Crystal Lake Memories: The Complete History of Friday the 13th (Documentary film, posthumous role) as Himself
