= Condemned: Criminal Origins =

2005 video game

- North American cover art
- Developer: Monolith Productions
- Publishers: Sega; Warner Bros. Interactive Entertainment
- Producer: David Hasle
- Designer: Frank Rooke
- Programmers: Joe Waters, Jr.; Kevin Stephens
- Artists: Matthew Allen; Eric Kohler
- Writer: Frank Rooke
- Composer: Nathan Grigg
- Engine: LithTech Jupiter EX
- Platforms: Xbox 360; Windows
- Release: Xbox 360: NA: November 22, 2005; EU: December 2, 2005; AU: March 23, 2006; Microsoft Windows: WW: April 11, 2006
- Genres: Survival horror, action
- Mode: Single-player

Condemned: Criminal Origins (released as simply Condemned in Europe and Australia) is a 2005 first-person action and survival horror video game for Xbox 360 and Windows. Developed by Monolith Productions and jointly published by Sega and Warner Bros. Interactive Entertainment, it was an Xbox 360 launch title and was released in North America in November 2005, in Europe in December, and in Australia in March 2006. The Windows version was released worldwide in April 2006. Monolith also released an online episodic flash game prequel, and there were plans for a film to expand the Condemned universe, with at least three additional games already mapped out by 2005. However, the film was never made, and the only addition to the franchise was Condemned 2: Bloodshot, which was released in 2008 for Xbox 360 and PlayStation 3.

The game tells the story of Ethan Thomas, an agent with the FBI's Serial Crime Unit (SCU). In the fictional city of Metro, there has been a surge in both serial killings and assaults perpetrated by vagrants, and Thomas is convinced the two are connected. As he hunts a killer dubbed the Match Maker, Thomas is framed for murder and, pursued by his former Bureau colleagues, he finds his whole life upended as he stumbles onto something that goes far beyond any one individual killer.

Aesthetically influenced by films such as The Silence of the Lambs and Seven, Condemned's designers wanted to create a game focused on either a new game mechanic or an existing mechanic with a fresh spin, and so they decided to apply their experience with first-person shooters to a game focused primarily on something not usually seen in first-person games – melee combat. Building a simple but robust combat system, the designers utilised the capabilities of the Xbox 360 to create a realistic and unsettling environment, with a heavy focus on visceral and violent close-quarters combat.

Condemned was well received by critics, who praised the combat mechanics, graphics, animations, AI, and, especially, the sound design and atmosphere. Common points of criticism included the game's linearity, a lack of variety in both level design and gameplay, and what was perceived as a poor implementation of the use of forensic tools. The game sold well upon its initial Xbox 360 release, going on to become the fifth best-selling launch title on the platform. It also won multiple categories in both GameSpot's and IGN's Best of 2005 awards.

== Gameplay ==
The player takes on an enemy in Condemned: Criminal Origins.

Condemned: Criminal Origins is a first-person psychological thriller video game with survival horror and action elements. There are two main components to the gameplay – combat and investigating crime scenes.

The game's combat is built primarily around melee; firearms are available but are relatively uncommon. Players can acquire melee weapons from their immediate surroundings in several ways; they can be found lying out in the open, they can be forced from the environment (such as pulling a pipe from a wall or snapping off a 2x4), or they can be taken from an enemy. Enemies can also acquire and use any weapon that the player can use, including firearms. Each weapon has its own combination of damage, speed, range, and blocking stats; so, for example, an axe may have higher damage and range stats than a pipe, but the pipe may have higher speed and blocking stats. There are two classes of melee weapon; debris weapons and entry tools. Debris weapons are items that have no function other than combat. Entry tools are items that can be used in combat but that also have an alternative function. For example, an axe can chop down certain doors, a crowbar can open certain safes, a sledgehammer can destroy certain padlocks, and a shovel can cut through certain electrical wires.

Blocking is an essential component of the game mechanics as the player can only take a few melee hits before dying. A successful block momentarily knocks an enemy off balance, giving the player a chance to attack. An additional component of the game's melee is the ability to perform "finishing moves" when an opponent is on their knees, such as a headbutt, a neck break, a punch, or a head slam. The player can also use a quick-kick, which is available at all times; if the player is unarmed, if they are carrying a firearm, or if they are carrying a melee weapon.

When using a firearm, the player cannot collect additional ammo, as firearms cannot be reloaded; each firearm lasts only as long as there are bullets in the current magazine. The player can also use the butt of any firearm as a melee weapon. However, unlike other melee weapons, firearms will break when used repeatedly. The player also has a taser which can be used to temporarily stun a target. This does minimal damage, but it does allow the player to seize the stunned enemy's weapon. However, after each use, the taser must recharge before it can be used again, meaning it cannot be used as a regular substitute for the game's melee weapons. Irrespective of whether the player is carrying a firearm or a melee weapon, only one weapon can be carried at a time.

The other primary game mechanic is forensic crime scene investigation. The game utilises a context-sensitive button, which can call upon a suite of tools to find and record evidence. When the player encounters an "Instinct Area", the game will alert them to the presence of evidence. Pressing the tool button will automatically deploy the correct detection tool needed to locate the evidence. Once the evidence has been located, pressing the tool button again will automatically ready the necessary collection tool. Once collected, the evidence is automatically sent to the lab to be analysed. Detection tools include a UV light, a laser light, and a spectrometer. Collection tools include a sampler, a portable 3D scanner, and a digital camera. Examples of evidence include fingerprints, footprints, fibers, residues, particles, and blood splatter.

== Plot ==
Ethan Thomas is an FBI agent assigned to the Serial Crime Unit (SCU) in the fictional city of Metro. Possessing the ability to sense a killer's actions, Thomas has the highest solve rate in the unit. However, many of his recent cases have gone cold. Meanwhile, he is convinced that the recent rise in serial killers is connected to a spike in crime, specifically assault amongst vagrants.

Arriving at the location of a homicide in a derelict building, Thomas is met by Det. Dickensen and Ofc. Becker of Metro PD. They conclude that the murder is the work of the "Match Maker", a killer that uses mannequins in his crimes. Realizing that someone else is in the building, they split up, but when Thomas loses his gun, a man takes it and holds him at gunpoint, saying, "we are both on the same path of righteousness." He then shoots and kills both Dickensen and Becker before pushing Thomas through a window.

Thomas wakes up in his apartment to find Malcolm Vanhorn, a family friend. Vanhorn warns Thomas that he is wanted for the deaths of the police and advises him to run. Assisted via phone by his colleague, Lt. Rosa, Thomas heads to a nearby metro station where he finds a room with a camera pointing at his apartment and a wall covered in newspapers, each one detailing a case Thomas worked, although many of the pages have a hand-drawn "X" on them. Finding evidence that the Match Maker is in an abandoned retail store, Thomas heads there.

In the store, he finds the Match Maker's body. Referring back to the newspapers, Rosa notes that all the articles with an X have gone cold, and she concludes that the man who took Thomas's gun is killing serial killers, hence why the cases went cold. She dubs him Serial Killer X (SKX). At the city library, Rosa reveals that she has found several anomalies in Thomas's personnel file - his bone density is abnormally high; he has an overactive serotonergic system; and there is a chest x-ray in which the vocal cords have been redacted. Meanwhile, Thomas begins to have visions of a man with metal implants in his body, most notably his mouth. Finding evidence that Serial Killer X may be operating out of an abandoned orchard, Thomas and Vanhorn head there. (Note: As the game has progressed, the loading screens between each level have been describing an epidemic of bird deaths in Metro, with birds falling out of the sky in certain parts of the city. Scientists discover that the birds are dying due to brain hemorrhaging, with one scientist noting, "their brains are simply dissolving." It is soon discovered that the birds are being drawn to certain areas by sonic fluctuations of unknown origin, and when the birds get close enough, these fluctuations cause hemorrhaging and death. The areas to which the birds are being drawn are also the areas that have seen the most significant spikes in crime. It is subsequently discovered that the sonic fluctuations also affect humans; those predisposed to violence find themselves suffering from hallucinations, paranoia, and uncontrollable rage. Also, amongst the police operating in the areas most affected by bird deaths, the rate of petty crime has risen 64% and the rate of domestic violence has risen 110%.)

As he explores the house, Thomas finds the Torturer's body. He takes SKX by surprise and seems poised to defeat him when he is attacked by Vanhorn. He hears Vanhorn refer to SKX as "Leland, nephew", pleading with him that he doesn't know his own mind, but Leland knocks Vanhorn out as Thomas faints. When he awakens, he is tied up and at the mercy of Leland, who brags about using Thomas to help him find victims. Vanhorn comes to and attacks Leland, allowing Thomas to escape. Vanhorn tells him that he must hunt down and kill the man with the implants as he is the cause of the violence in the city. As Thomas searches, he hears a voice telling him, "You belong to us, Ethan. You have always belonged to us." He eventually tracks down the man and kills him by ripping out his implants.

As Vanhorn drives Thomas home, Thomas discovers that Leland is alive in the trunk. Vanhorn explains, "he was a good boy. We were all good people. We were able to fight it back, most of us. My nephew was not as strong." Thomas pulls his gun on Leland, and the player is given the option of whether to shoot or not. If they do not, Leland pulls out his own gun and seemingly commits suicide. Sometime later, Thomas, now cleared of the deaths of Dickensen and Becker, meets Rosa. She explains that the FBI believes Leland was part of a cult and asks him if he knows anything about it. (Note: Some of the game's unlockable material reveals more background information regarding the cult in the form of internal FBI reports. Taking place before the game begins, these reports are all labeled "Black Clearance Only", and discuss the attempts of the FBI's linguistics department to decipher scrawlings left at various murder scenes. The reports describe these scrawlings as a "mix of ancient and contemporaneous languages, both alphabetic and ideographic with a series of Arabic numerals. Odd features include the presence of quite clear words in Mycenaean, Japanese characters, and the aforementioned Arabic numerals, matched with seemingly meaningless hieroglyphics. Largest group of recognizable characters are representations of what seems to be Minoan Linear A or Linear B script." A few weeks into the investigation, Dr. Strevor, the head of the linguistics department, beats a co-worker to death and then jumps to his death through a window. The agent assigned to the case notes that "upon review of the audiotape, we have detected an odd unidentified sound heard in the background." He orders an autopsy of Strevor, but the results (and the tape of the killing) are classified by Black Ops Command. Meanwhile, the linguistics department come to believe that the writings are a creed, which describes a cult formed around figures called "The Darkened", who "have learned the audio capability to 'influence' humans." The cult members believe that there is a war between them and the rest of humanity, and the report notes that "from the ancient linguistic make-up of the creed, this 'war' between the light and darkened has been going on for probably thousands of years." The report ends by noting, "a search of all other extant serial death cases with similar elements to what has been found in the creed has revealed several additional cases with strong similarities. We found traces of grisly cases that went as far back as 1908. Black Ops Central Command has intervened and deemed information as Coded Double Black.") However, she tips him off that she is wired before he answers. Rosa leaves and Thomas goes to the bathroom. While there, he vomits and the implanted man is seen approaching him in the mirror. The man disappears, and Thomas spins around, showing that his mouth now bears the same implants.

== Development ==
Condemned: Criminal Origins was announced by Sega and Monolith Productions in February 2005 for PC and as yet unspecified next generation consoles. Sega of America's Vice President of Entertainment Marketing, Scott A. Steinberg, said, "the atmospheric tension and cinematic qualities" of the game would "offer consumers the rich experience of a psychological thriller, something that has not been accomplished on previous hardware platforms." Monolith's CEO Samantha Ryan said, "new leaps in technology are allowing our teams to create immersive game environments that are incredibly realistic." She explained that the "goal with Condemned is to combine a disturbing atmosphere with realistic physics, devious AI, and a sophisticated combat system."

In April, it was revealed that the game would be releasing on Xbox 360. The game was first shown at E3 in May as a non-playabe demo. A playable demo was made available at G-Phoria later that month. A more expansive playable demo was presented at X05 in October. Shortly after X05, Sega announced that the game would be an Xbox 360 launch title, releasing on November 22. The game went gold on November 2.

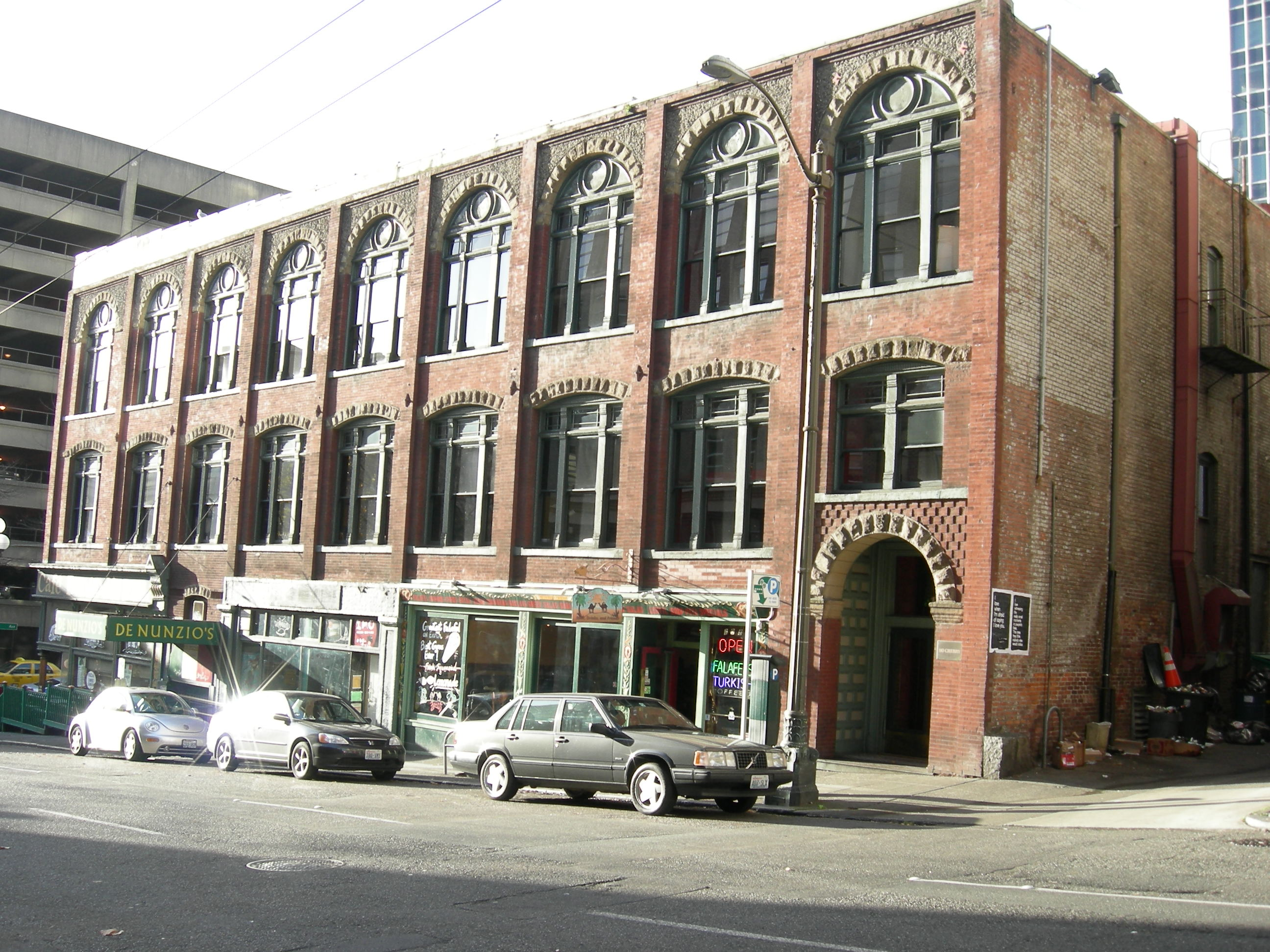
Scheuerman Block at 700 First Avenue in the Pioneer Square neighbourhood of Seattle. The look of the game's Metro City was loosely based on Seattle.

The game's writer and lead designer, Frank Rooke, cites films such as Adrian Lyne's Jacob's Ladder (1990), Jonathan Demme's The Silence of the Lambs (1991), David Fincher's Se7en (1995), Danny Boyle's 28 Days Later (2002), and James Wan's Saw (2004), as well as the TV show The X-Files, as the main influences for the game's atmosphere and aesthetic. Prior to development, Monolith carried out extensive research on real-world serial killers, as they wanted to better understand the psychology of such people. Basing Metro very loosely on Seattle, they also hired surveyors to search out abandoned and condemned buildings, empty warehouses, and neglected and forgotten areas of the city so as to give them a template for the game's visual design. Of the atmosphere, producer David Hasle says that the team focused on three types of horror: shock (such as jump scares), tension (using player anticipation to build dread), and psychology ("the player, will find bizarre hallucinations, strange visions occurring and you won't know if they are real or just in the player's head").

Of the game's combat system, Rooke notes that the team "wanted to mess around, find game mechanics that could be considered new, or at least tweaked a little bit to be fresh." Wanting the melee combat to be "absolutely satisfying, in the same way that dueling somebody with a huge machine gun or shotgun is," Hasle explains that the key design elements underpinning the system were close-quarters combat and gritty, inelegant street fighting, whereby players (and enemies) must do whatever necessary to survive. Hasle states, "we wanted to bring the enemy into your face and keep him there until the combat was resolved." Wanting a "visceral kind of raw feel", the team kept the combat simple; "we didn't mess it up with a bunch of combos; it's just a basic raw, primal kind of fight that you would expect in this setting." An important part of this is the game's AI, with different enemies reacting in different ways to being attacked; some will become more aggressive, some will try to flee, some will hide in the hopes of a surprise attack, some will look for a stronger weapon. The variety of possible reactions adds to the unpredictability of the combat system.

In terms of technology, the game uses per-pixel lighting, volumetric lighting, shaders, anti-aliasing, normal mapping, color mapping, specular mapping, and shadow mapping, with especial emphasis on realistic physics. Speaking of the game's lighting, Hasle explains, "there is absolutely no static lighting in Condemned. Static lighting places light sources in the world and then calculates the shadows that correspond to that light source. The shadows are then burned onto the world and cannot be manipulated." For Condemned, the team felt that "creating natural light and shadow movement is important to creating and maintaining a frightening and tense mood." Tied to this, the game "features numerous unique and carefully crafted shaders. Shaders essentially involve the layering of several textures that react to a light source to create a specific surface reflection [...] these features are highlighted through the use of several stylized screen effects, such as film grain, bleach bypass, and dark shader effects."

=== The Dark ===
Some of the game's unlockable bonus material reveals that it was originally known as The Dark and differed from the final product in several ways. For example, the player character was called Agent Cross, and the game followed him on a government-sanctioned investigation, rather than acting as a rogue on the run from the law. Cross possessed the same instinctual abilities as Thomas, but he could use various magical spells. For example, he could pull a gun from an enemy's hands or break obstacles without touching them. The forensic tools used by Cross also differed, as the detection and collection tools were one individual item – the UV light, for instance, could illuminate clues and then be used to physically take samples.

== Reception ==
Reception

Aggregate score
| Aggregator | Score | |
| Aggregator | PC | Xbox 360 |
|---|---|---|
| Metacritic | 78/100 | 81/100 |

Review scores
| Publication | Score | |
| Publication | PC | Xbox 360 |
|---|---|---|
| Computer Gaming World | 6/10 | |
| Edge | | 6/10 |
| Eurogamer | 6/10 | 7/10 |
| Game Informer | | 8.8/10 |
| GameSpot | 8.1/10 | 8/10 |
| GameSpy | 4/5 | 4.5/5 |
| IGN | 8.5/10 | 8.7/10 |
| Official Xbox Magazine (UK) | | 8/10 |
| Official Xbox Magazine (US) | | 8.5/10 |
| PC Zone | 8.5/10 | |

Condemned: Criminal Origins received "generally favorable reviews", with the Xbox 360 version holding a score of 81 out of 100 on Metacritic, based on 72 reviews, and the PC version holding a score of 79 out of 100, based on 24 reviews.

GameSpy's Will Tuttle scored the Xbox 360 version 4-and-a-half out of 5, praising the "highly atmospheric, downright disturbing environments" and the "brutally visceral combat." Calling the graphics "jaw-droppingly detailed", he also felt the game had "some of the best sound design ever to grace a video game." On the other hand, he was critical of the implementation of the forensic tools. Scott Osborne, also of GameSpy, scored the PC version 4 out of 5, calling it "a startlingly powerful experience." He praised the sound effects for creating "an unparalleled level of visceral violence," and also lauded the atmosphere, lighting, AI, and combat mechanics, although he was critical of the forensic tools.

Game Informer's Jeremy Loss scored the Xbox 360 version 8.8 out of 10. Although he criticized the game's length and plot, he praised it for featuring "some true scares, a fresh approach to its genre, great graphics, and fun gameplay mechanics." IGN's Charles Onyett scored the Xbox 360 version 8.7 out of 10, and the PC version 8.5 out of 10. Praising the sound design ("the game's most frightening aspect"), combat, graphics, animations, and AI, he was critical of the linearity and the use of forensic tools. Calling the game "an unforgettable experience," he praised it as "one of the most immersive and atmospheric games I've ever played."

PC Zone scored the PC version 8.5 out of 10, calling it "brutal, visceral and hard-hitting" and "a masterpiece of nerve-jangling tension." Praising the atmosphere, sound, and AI, their main criticisms were the linearity, length, and convoluted story. Writing for Official Xbox Magazine, Francesca Reyes scored it 8.5 out of 10, and was especially impressed with the AI. She argued that the game illustrated that "next-generation gaming is just as much about gameplay as it is about graphics." The UK edition of Official Xbox Magazine scored it 8 out of 10, praising the "masterful sound" and the "awesome sense of dread." Their main criticism was "a lack of variety in the all-too linear gameplay."

GameSpot's Greg Kasavin scored the Xbox 360 version 8 out of 10, and the PC version 8.1 out of 10, calling it "a visceral, highly atmospheric experience." Although he was critical of the "monotonous gameplay", he did praise the combat mechanics ("it captures hand-to-hand combat with intense, lifelike brutality like no other game before it"). He was also impressed with the AI, animations, and sound. He did, however, feel that "the longer you play, the more you'll wish that there was more substance." Eurogamer's Kristen Reed scored it 7 out of 10, praising the combat mechanics, sound design, and graphics, but finding the gameplay "too simplistic" and criticizing the forensic tools as "giving the player no chance to act as an investigator at any point." He concluded, "in the end, its place in gaming history will go down as merely a pretty good horror adventure."

Edge scored the Xbox 360 version 6 out of 10, calling it "scary, vicious, visually progressive." Computer Gaming World's Jeff Green scored the PC version 6 out of 10, calling it the "best survival horror on the PC". He praised the atmosphere, lighting, sound, and combat ("both visceral and satisfying"), but felt the forensic sections were poorly implemented.

In a 2013 retrospective, Eurogamer's Rick Lane called Condemned "the first and perhaps only game to really get to grips with first-person melee combat." He also wrote, "as a melee fighting game, Condemned is yet to be beaten for both its originality and creating an authentic experience with the limited tools available." In a 2020 retrospective, Collin Henderson of Horror Obsessive called it "a forgotten classic that more people need to check out."

=== Sales, awards, and accolades ===
In North America, the game was the fifth best-selling Xbox 360 launch title, selling considerably more units than had been anticipated.

At GameSpot's Best and Worst of 2005 awards, the game won Best Sound Effects and Best Use of Upset Disheveled Men, and was a runner-up in both Best Xbox 360 Game and a readers' poll in the same category. At IGN's Best of 2005 awards, it won Best Xbox 360 Action Game, Best Use of Sound, and Best Game No One Played, and was a runner up in Best Artistic Design and Best Story. At the 9th Annual Interactive Achievement Awards, it was nominated for both First-Person Action Game of the Year and Outstanding Achievement in Sound Design.

| Year | Publication or ceremony | Award | Result | Ref. |
|---|---|---|---|---|
| 2005 | GameSpot | Best Sound Effects | Won | |
| 2005 | GameSpot | Best Use of Upset Disheveled Men | Won | |
| 2005 | GameSpot | Best Xbox 360 Game | Nominated | |
| 2005 | GameSpot | Best Xbox 360 Game (Readers Choice) | Nominated | |
| 2005 | IGN | Best Xbox 360 Action Game | Won | |
| 2005 | IGN | Best Use of Sound | Won | |
| 2005 | IGN | Best Game No One Played | Won | |
| 2005 | IGN | Best Artistic Design | Nominated | |
| 2005 | IGN | Best Story | Nominated | |
| 2006 | 9th Annual Interactive Achievement Awards | First-Person Action Game of the Year | Nominated | |
| 2006 | 9th Annual Interactive Achievement Awards | Outstanding Achievement in Sound Design | Nominated | |

In 2006, IGN ranked it at #10 in their scariest games ever made list. In 2008, they ranked it #1 in their 13 Scariest Games of This Generation. In 2014, they ranked it at #9 in their top ten surivial horror games. In 2015, Game Informer ranked it at #10 in their "Top 25 Horror Games of All Time" list. In 2017, GamesRadar+ ranked it at #12 in their top 20 horror games list. In 2020, Slant Magazine ranked it at #13 in their "25 Best Horror Games of All Time" list. In 2022, Rock Paper Shotgun ranked it at #9 in their best horror games for PC list. Also in 2022, Den of Geek ranked it at #14 in their "30 Scariest Horror Games Ever Made" list.

=== German ban ===
In February 2008 all copies of Condemned were confiscated in Germany because of § 131 StGB, which outlaws the dissemination or public display of media "which describe cruel or otherwise inhuman acts of violence against human beings in a manner which expresses a glorification or rendering harmless of such acts of violence or which represents the cruel or inhuman aspects of the event in a manner which injures human dignity". Although it is not illegal to own the game, it is illegal to distribute it.

== Other media ==
=== Prequel ===
Debuting on the game's official website towards the end of September, and released in weekly instalments, Condemned: The Prequel Story is a six-part episodic flash game set shortly before the main game. It begins with Agent Mallory of the SCU getting called to a homicide; a young man has been found stabbed in a derelict building. As Mallory searches the building, he finds a photograph of a young woman with the caption, "share your happiness with others today". Identifying the location where the photo was taken (a self storage facility), Mallory heads there and sees the girl being abducted on the security footage. Meanwhile, Christopher Vine, a colleague of the murdered man, has been reported missing. At Vine's house, a phone message leads Mallory to an abandoned factory. There, he finds a tape recorder playing on repeat, "I found you. Time is running out. I will kill you." A vagrant then approaches Mallory and says, "he left this for you", giving him a photo of a building. He then learns that the fingerprints on the murdered man's body are those of Vine. Heading to the location depicted in the photo, he finds the body of the missing girl, with a note directing him to another derelict factory. There, Mallory finds Vine's body. Mallory is then attacked by Serial Killer X. He escapes, but SKX pursues him through the building. Eventually, he catches Mallory, and beats him to death with a 2x4.

=== Expanded universe plans ===
In October 2005, Warner Bros. Pictures announced plans to release a film tied to the then-upcoming Condemned: Criminal Origins. The plan was for the film to take place in the same fictional universe as the game, rather than being an adaptation, and ultimately, the Condemned universe would gradually expand across multiple video games and films. This expanded universe was the idea of Jace Hall and Nathan Henderickson. Hall, former Monolith CEO and current vice president of Warner Bros. Interactive Entertainment, said they wanted to "come up with something specifically designed to use multiple mediums to tell stories that had some continuity and connective thread [...] we wanted to create a universe that, like Star Wars, was big enough where different stories could exist". Indeed, as well as the game and film, Hall had mapped out a storyline that would encompass three additional games, culminating in Condemned 4.

With the film named Species X, Kurt Sutter was hired to write the script, with Basil Iwanyk and David S. Goyer on board as executive producers. The story followed a police officer hunting down a serial killer, but along the way, he discovers that the killer may be tied to other still open murder cases. As he discovers he has supernatural abilities, the cop begins to question his own nature, eventually discovering that he has alien origins. Ultimately, he is dragged into a war between two alien races and must reconcile his humanity with his alien DNA.

In August 2007, it was revealed that the film had been renamed Unforgettable and that Tarsem Singh had been hired as director. Nothing more was heard of the project after that and the film was never made, with the only expansion of the game's story being that found in the video game sequel.

=== Sequel ===
A direct sequel to Criminal Origins, Condemned 2: Bloodshot was released on Xbox 360 and PlayStation 3 in 2008. Once again developed by Monolith and published by Sega, it expands on the gameplay mechanics of the original game and adds several new features such as environmental kills, a larger assortment of weapons, and combos during combat. It also completely overhauls the use of forensic tools, giving the player much more freedom when investigating.

=== Future ===
In a Facebook post in January 2015, Hall (by now the sole owner of the Condemned IP), addressed the fact that he is frequently asked about a Condemned 3. Noting that both of the Condemned games sold well, he said, "I am contemplating finding an interested and proven Indie development team so that they can take over the franchise and move it forward."

The following week, after his post received a very positive response, Hall was interviewed by IGN. Asked if he had approached any developers himself, he said, "I have not approached anyone. I have received some inquiries over the last 24 hours. Ultimately I tell them to just send me a proposal for consideration. I place no limiting parameters on the proposal. My desire is to fully empower an indie developer with all the decision-making authority." If the project were to go ahead, he stated,

I believe that the best approach to this is to let a passionate developer do what they do best without interference or limitations imposed by me. Once I decide to grant the rights to a team, they are the boss. I plan on making a real commitment to that. I've developed many games in my career and I know how unpleasant it is to have 'the brand' lording over every design/gameplay decision you are making.

He also said that he wouldn't impose any restrictions regarding how funding was raised, or what platforms the game was to appear on. He wouldn't even mandate that it be a full Condemned game;

I am going to grant a license to use the Condemned franchise in general, and the chosen developer will be able to pick what kind of game they want to make. They can choose their vision of the content. They can build up momentum. Perhaps a prequel. Perhaps a simple mobile phone app for starters. It's all on the table. I'm open to hearing new ideas.

Noting that the Condemned game was originally conceived as part of an expanded universe that was never brought to fruition, he pointed out that all the potential for different mediums is still there; "perhaps it would make sense for a mobile app developer to make one kind of game derived from the Condemned universe, and then an entirely different developer create a console game that is Condemned 3. Perhaps while that is happening, some graphic novel artists want to take the franchise and produce a book. There is room here for all these things/ideas."
