= Death of an Angel (film) =

- Directed by: Petru Popescu
- Screenplay by: Petru Popescu
- Produced by: Peter Burrell
- Starring: Bonnie Bedelia; Alex Colon; Abel Franco; Irma García
- Cinematography: Fred Murphy
- Music by: Jay Ferguson; Peter T. Myers
- Production companies: Sundance Institute; Inverness Productions
- Distributed by: Twentieth Century Fox
- Release date: March 7, 1986
- Running time: 91 minutes
- Country: United States
- Language: English
- Box office: $18,000

Death of an Angel is a 1986 religious drama film written and directed by Petru Popescu. It stars Bonnie Bedelia as the main character. The film was released on March 7, 1986, in limited release.

== Cast ==
- Bonnie Bedelia as Grace McKenzie, a priest.
- Alex Colon as Robles
- Abel Franco as Don Tarjetas
- Irma García as Rosalba
- Pamela Ludwig as Vera, Grace's daughter.
- Leonard Lewis as Demecio
- Nick Mancuso as Father Angel

== Production ==
The film is co-produced by Sundance Institute. Principal photography for the film takes place in El Paso, Texas, US.

== Reception ==
The film received average reviews from critics. It grossed $18,000 in the United States.

== See also ==
- List of Christian films
