= Forced Entry (1975 film) =

1975 film by Jim Sotos

- Film poster
- Directed by: Jim Sotos
- Screenplay by: Henry Scarpelli
- Produced by: Jim Sotos; Henry Scarpelli
- Starring: Tanya Roberts; Ron Max; Nancy Allen
- Cinematography: Aaron Kleinman
- Edited by: Felix Dileone; Jim Markovic; Drake Silliman
- Music by: Tommy Vig
- Production company: Productions Two
- Distributed by: Howard Mahler Films
- Release date: October 10, 1975
- Running time: 88 minutes
- Country: United States
- Language: English

Forced Entry (also known as The Last Victim) is a 1975 American horror film by director Jim Sotos. The film is a PG-rated (re-rated R later) remake of a 1973 pornographic horror film of the same name by director Shaun Costello.

== Plot ==
The plot centers on a psychopath who is on a violent spree as he randomly stalks and invades the homes of suburban women whom he considers to be whores. His modus operandi is to break in, terrorize, rape, and murder his victims while recording their pleas and his crimes on a portable tape recorder.

One day, Nancy, a young and pretty housewife, accepts a ride from a stranger, unaware that he is a stalker who has been following her for some time. She manipulates his emotions to stay alive and kill him.

== Cast ==
- Tanya Roberts as Nancy Ulman
- Ron Max as Carl
- Nancy Allen as Hitch Hiker
- Michael Tucci as Richie
- Brian Freilino as Peter Ulman
- Billy Longo as Charlie
- Glenn Scarpelli as Glenn Ulman

== Home media ==
Harmony Vision released the film on VHS in the United States. In 2019, Dark Force Entertainment released the film on Blu-ray with two versions of the movie included on it, one using the title Forced Entry title and the other using the title The Last Victim. Neither version matches the VHS release, which contains quite a bit more footage in the sexual assault scenes.
