= Petru Popescu =

American novelist

Petru Popescu (born February 1, 1944) is a Romanian-American writer, director and film producer, author of the novels Almost Adam and Amazon Beaming.

== Romanian beginnings ==
The son of theater critic Radu Popescu and actress Nelly Cutava, he was born in Bucharest, and graduated from the Spiru Haret National College, after which he studied English language and literature at the University of Bucharest. His debut was a collection of poems, Zeu printre blocuri ("A God Between Apartment Buildings"). In 1969, he published Prins ("Caught").

He went on a Herder scholarship to Vienna (1971–1972), and in 1973 participated in the International Writing Program at the University of Iowa.

== Emigration ==
After participating in that writing program, Popescu defected in 1973 or 1974 while in England on a private trip related to the English translation of his book Sfârșitul bahic, taught comparative literature in Great Britain, and moved to the United States in 1975, where he studied at the Center for Advanced Film Studies of the American Film Institute. The Romanian government tried him for treason. In Romania his books were banned.

At the time of his defection he was the Union of Communist Youth secretary of the Romanian Writers' Union and a candidate member of the Central Committee of the Union of Communist Youth.

In the United States, he married Iris Friedman, with whom he has two children: Adam and Chloe. His 2001 novel The Oasis is noted as "A memoir of love and survival in concentration camp" written in the first person as if in the words of the biographee, Blanka Friedman.

== Sundance ==
Popescu received a letter from Robert Redford inviting him to submit a script for consideration for the Sundance Film Festival. In 1983, Popescu took Death of an Angel to Sundance, where the script came to near finalization. The festival enabled him to find backers for the film, which was released in 1986.

== Works ==
=== Novels written in Romanian ===
- 1969 - Prins
- 1970 - Dulce ca mierea e glonțul patriei
- 1973 - Să crești într-un an cât alții într-o zi
- 1973 - Sfârșitul bahic
- 1974 - Copiii Domnului
- 1993 - Înainte și după Edith
- 2002 - Întoarcerea
- 2002 - Oaza
- 2003 - În coasta lui Adam
- 2008 - Urme în Timp
- 2009 - Supleantul

=== Bibliography in English ===
- 1973 - Bough
- 1974 - Blues
- 1975 - Burial of the vine
- 1975 - Boxes, Stairs & Whistle Time
- Popescu, Petru (1977). The Last Wave. Sydney: Angus & Robertson. ISBN 0-207-13591-6.
- 1978 - Before and After Edith
- Popescu, Petru (1989). In Hot Blood. New York: Fawcett Gold Medal. ISBN 0-449-14554-9.
- Popescu, Petru (1991). Amazon Beaming. New York: Viking. ISBN 0-670-82997-8.
- Popescu, Petru (1996). Almost Adam : a novel. New York: William Morrow. ISBN 0-688-14863-8.
- Popescu, Petru (1997). The Return. New York: Grove Press. ISBN 0-8021-1613-2.
- Popescu, Petru (2001). The Oasis: A Memoir of Love and Survival in a Concentration Camp. New York: St. Martin's Press. ISBN 0-312-27869-1.
- Popescu, Petru (2001). Weregirls: Birth of the Pack. New York: Tor Teen. ISBN 978-0-7653-1641-7.
- 2008 - Weregirls: Through the Moon Glass
- Popescu, Petru (2008). Footprints in Time. New York: Laura Geringer Books. ISBN 978-0-06-088400-0.
- Popescu, Petru (2009). Girl Mary. New York: Simon & Schuster. ISBN 978-1-4165-3263-7.

=== Films ===
- 1972 - Drum în penumbră - as producer
- 1977 - The Last Wave (aka Black Rain in USA) - Ultimul val - as producer
- 1982 - Friday the 13th Part III (1982) (uncredited) ... aka Friday the 13th Part 3 (USA: video title)
- 1984 - Obsessive Love - (TV, story) - as writer
- 1986 - Death of an Angel - Moartea unui înger - as director
- 1988 - Emma: Queen of the South Seas TV mini-series - as writer
- 1994 - Nobody's Children (TV) - as writer
- 2013 - Crystal Lake Memories: The Complete History of Friday the 13th - documentary film, as himself
