= Behind the Screen (TV series) =

American television series

- Cast of Behind The Screen
- Created by: David Jacobs
- Country of origin: United States
- No. of seasons: 1
- No. of episodes: 13

Original release
- Network: CBS
- Release: October 9, 1981 – January 8, 1982

Behind the Screen is an American late-night weekly serial which aired on CBS (Fridays, 11:30 PM EST) from October 9, 1981 to January 8, 1982.

== Series overview ==
Behind the Screen was created by David Jacobs (Dallas, Knots Landing) for CBS, which wanted a late night counterpoint to ABC and NBC's more successful efforts in that timeslot. Drawing upon his experience with the prime-time serials, Behind the Screen was a dramatization of the goings-on at a fictional TV soap opera called Generations. This was not the first attempt to explore the concept of a "soap within a soap" as radio soaps had used the idea as far as back as the 1940s (A Woman To Remember). Ryan's Hope had also done a similar storyline in the early 1980s.

The show premiered as an hour-long special, and regular episodes were 30 minutes. It revolved around the beautiful young star of Generations, Janie-Claire Willow (Janine Turner), who was a pawn in a power struggle between her wheelchair-using mother Zina (Joanne Linville), her powerful agent Evan (Mel Ferrer) and her show's leading man, Brian (Michael Sabatino).

The show's early pacing was described as "a bit meandering" and it had problems finding an audience. The show was canceled after only 3 months on the air. The last episode focused on a backstage party where starlet Joyce Daniels was poisoned. Suspicion quickly fell on Lynette Porter (Debbi Morgan). In a bit of levity, Michele Lee (a star on Jacobs' Knots Landing) appeared as herself, playing a guest at the party; when questioned by police, she was mistakenly identified by the cops as Mary Tyler Moore.

== Cast and characters ==
The cast included Generations creator and producer Gerry Holmby (Joshua Bryant); his screenwriter wife Dory Ranfield (Loyita Chapel); his son, Brian Michael Sabatino, a cast member on Generations; Brian's lover Janie-Claire Willow, star of Generations; Janie-Claire's brother Jordan (Scott Mulhern); Janie-Claire's invalid mother Zina (Joanne Linville); her actress roommate Lynette Porter (Debbi Morgan); Janie-Claire and Lynette's conniving manager Evan Hammer (Mel Ferrer); movie mogul Merritt Madison (Warren Stevens); Merritt's son Karl (Mark Pinter), who was Dory's former lover; and Bobby Danzig (Bruce Fairbairn), a married lawyer who is struggling with his homosexuality.

== Episodes ==
No.	Title	Directed by	Written by	Original release date	US viewers (millions)
1	"Episode 1"	William E. Glenn	David Jacobs	October 9, 1981	7.4
2	"Episode 2"	William E. Glenn	Ronnie Wenker-Konner	October 16, 1981	5.8
3	"Episode 3"	William E. Glenn	Peggy Schibi	October 23, 1981	6.7
4	"Episode 4"	William E. Glenn	Margaret DePriest	November 6, 1981	5.1
5	"Episode 5"	William E. Glenn	Peggy Schibi	November 13, 1981	5.7
6	"Episode 6"	William E. Glenn	Ronnie Wenker-Konner	November 20, 1981	6.2
7	"Episode 7"	William E. Glenn	Margaret DePriest	November 27, 1981	5.8
8	"Episode 8"	William E. Glenn	Peggy Schibi	December 4, 1981	5.4
9	"Episode 9"	William E. Glenn	Peggy Schibi	December 11, 1981	5.1
10	"Episode 10"	William E. Glenn	Peggy Schibi	December 18, 1981	5.5
11	"Episode 11"	William E. Glenn	Ronnie Wenker-Konner	December 25, 1981	4.4
12	"Episode 12"	William E. Glenn	Peggy Schibi	January 1, 1982	6.8
13	"Episode 13"	William E. Glenn	Ronnie Wenker-Konner	January 8, 1982	5.8
