= Anatomy of a Scene =

Anatomy of a Scene is an American television series produced by and aired on Sundance Channel from 2001 to 2005. As a tagline for the series notes, each 30-minute episode "dissects the art of filmmaking" of a scene from a specific film, often a film previously showcased at a Sundance Film Festival.

An episode examines the scene from multiple perspectives, such as production design, costume design, cinematography, storyboards, writing, music, acting, and directing. Interviews with the cast and crew are interspersed with snippets from the film.

Episodes of the show were often included on the DVD releases of the films they study.

== Films "dissected" ==
Episodes were produced for the following films:

- American Splendor
- The Anniversary Party
- BAADASSSSS!
- The Believer
- Buffalo Soldiers
- The Cat's Meow
- The Clearing
- Confidence
- The Cooler
- The Dangerous Lives of Altar Boys
- The Deep End
- Die, Mommie, Die!
- Donnie Darko
- The Door in the Floor
- Far From Heaven
- Frailty
- Garden State
- Girl with a Pearl Earring
- Gosford Park
- Hedwig and the Angry Inch
- Memento
- Monster's Ball
- Narc
- Off the Map
- One Hour Photo
- Prozac Nation
- The Quiet American
- The Rules of Attraction
- Saved!
- Sidewalks of New York
- The Singing Detective
- Stander
- Tadpole
- The United States of Leland
- Waking Life
