= Larry Zerner =

American lawyer and actor (born 1963)

- Born: September 29, 1963 (age 63); Los Angeles, California, U.S.

Lawrence J. Zerner (born September 8, 1963) is an American lawyer and actor. He appeared in the 1982 horror film Friday the 13th Part III as Shelly, the original owner of the infamous hockey mask which became Jason Voorhees's trademark. He later reprised the role in the 2017 video game Friday the 13th: The Game.

== Early life ==
Zerner was born and raised in Los Angeles, California, the youngest of six children. He has five older sisters. Zerner attended Fairfax High School.

== Career ==
Zerner is best known for his portrayal of Shelly in Friday the 13th Part III (1982).

Other film roles include the 1984 movie Hadley's Rebellion. He made a guest appearance on the television series Fame. Zerner was born in Los Angeles, California. He was discovered on a street corner in Westwood, Los Angeles, California, handing out passes to a screening of The Road Warrior.

After quitting acting in 1987, Zerner became an entertainment lawyer in Hollywood. Commenting on his career shift, he said:

Basically, my dad was a lawyer. I had no desire to be a lawyer... And then I graduated from school. I didn't really have... after Friday the 13th, there weren't really parts coming. It didn't lead to a TV series or anything. I wasn't really making any money, and my dad said that he would pay for law school. I said, “Well, it will buy three years. I don't know what I'm doing, but it'll buy me three years.” And that was it. It turned out I took the LSAT, I scored in the top 2% on the LSAT. I have a good brain for that kind of thing, I did really well in law school, and turns out I have good aptitude. I'm a good lawyer. I'm a much better lawyer than I am an actor. Not that I'm a bad actor, but I'm a better lawyer.

In 2005, Larry represented Jeff Bergquist in a copyright infringement lawsuit against Daniel Knauf and HBO over the television series Carnivàle. Also in 2005, Zerner represented George Lutz in a lawsuit against the makers of the remake of The Amityville Horror.

Larry was a contestant on the ABC prime time version of Who Wants to Be a Millionaire but did not make it to the "hot seat" with Regis Philbin.

On February 9, 2007, Larry was the $250,000 winner of the Last Man Standing edition of 1 vs. 100, defeating, among others, Ken Jennings, Annie Duke, Brad Rutter, Kevin Olmstead and Nancy Christy. In 2009, he appeared on Doug Benson's comedy podcast I Love Movies (now known as Doug Loves Movies) where he donated $1,800 to the Los Angeles, California Food Bank.

Zerner returned to acting in 2013 in Knights of Badassdom and has appeared in numerous films since, including one video game. He has played a character with the same name Shelly in different franchises on four occasions.

== Filmography ==
Year	Title	Role	Notes
1982	Friday the 13th Part III	Shelly	Character has been known as "Shelly Greenblatt" in the 1988 novelization and "Shelly Finkelstein" in the 2017 video game.
1982	Fame	Stage Manager	Episode: "And the Winner Is...."
1986	New Love, American Style	Bachelor	Episode: "Love a Gram/Love and the Apartment"
1987	Hadley's Rebellion	Dorm Boy	
2009	His Name Was Jason: 30 Years of Friday the 13th	Himself	Documentary film
2013	Knights of Badassdom	Shelly	Uncredited
2013	Crystal Lake Memories: The Complete History of Friday the 13th	Himself	Documentary film
2014	Found	Scientist	Short film
2016	The Horror Geeks	Shelly	TV movie
2016	The Epidemic	Tim	
2017	Death House	Shelly the Prop Man	
2017	Friday the 13th: The Game	Sheldon "Shelly" Finkelstein	Video game, DLC update; did not appear on the initial release.
2023	Never Hike Alone 2	Mayor Paul Owen	Fan Film
