= Tracie Savage =

American journalist and actress

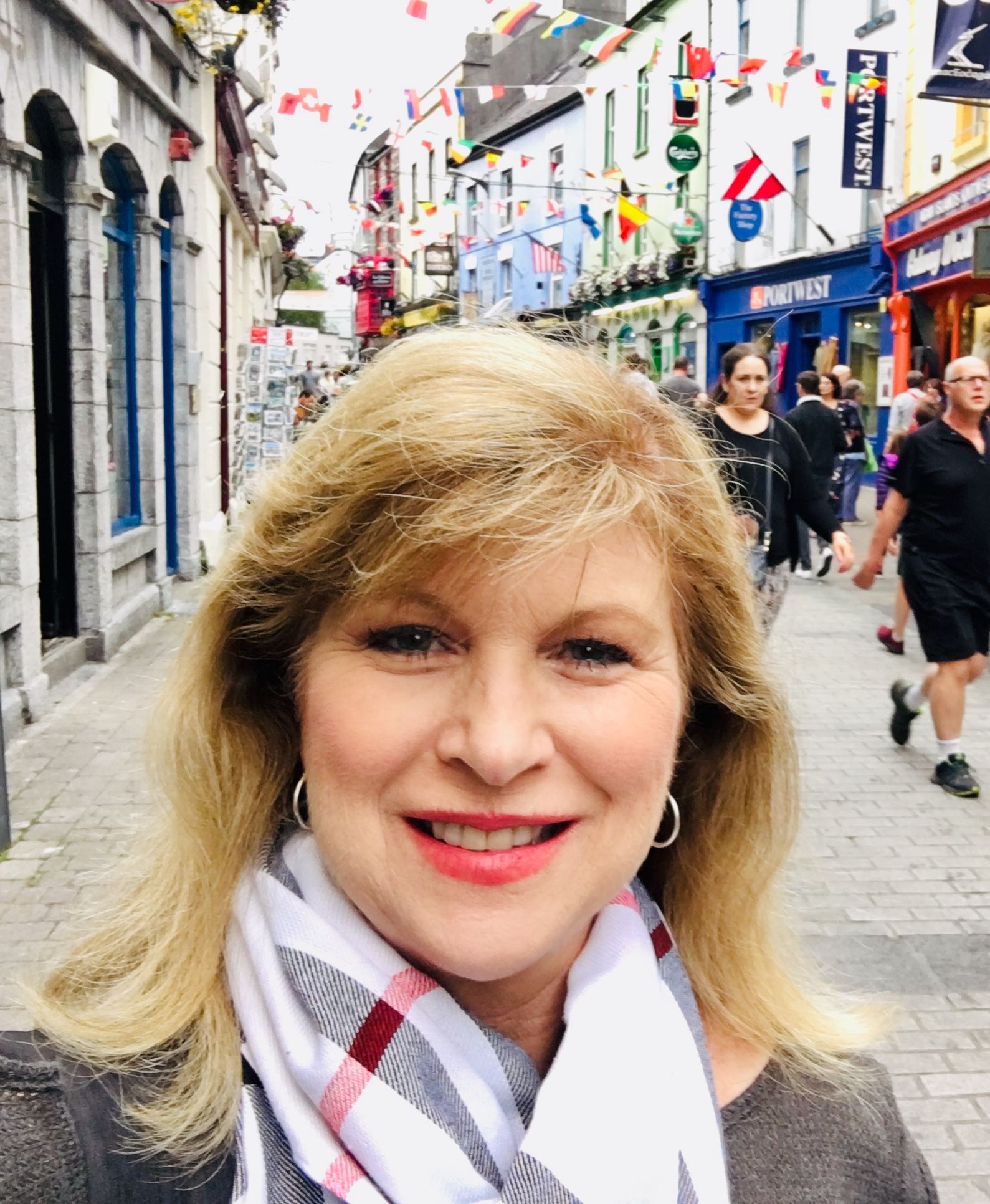
- Born: Chicago, Illinois, U.S.
- Education: University of Michigan
- Occupations: Journalist; actress; professor
- Children: 1
- Awards: 2 Los Angeles Emmy Awards
- Website: traciesavage.tv

Tracie Savage is an American actress and journalist. She has starred in movies and on television.

== Life and career ==
Savage was born in Chicago, Illinois and spent her early childhood in Livonia, Michigan before relocating with her family to Los Angeles when she was seven years old.

Savage graduated from the University of Michigan with a BA in communications. Her mother, Judy, became a talent agent after Tracie began her acting career. Her television appearances include the role of Christy Kennedy on the NBC TV series Little House on the Prairie from 1974 to 1975. She had originally auditioned for the role of Laura Ingalls. She also made guest appearances on television shows including Love, American Style, Marcus Welby, M.D., Family, Happy Days, and Here's Boomer. Her film roles include the character "Debbie" in the 1982 horror movie Friday the 13th Part III. After filming the movie, Savage retired from acting to pursue journalism.

Savage started her career as a reporter/anchor in 1985 first working at WEYI-TV in Flint, Michigan, then at WHIO-TV in Dayton, Ohio from 1986 to 1991. After relocating to Los Angeles in 1991, she worked at KCAL-TV. Beginning in March 1994, she was a reporter/anchor at NBC4 in Los Angeles, California for seven years. Since September 2001, she has been the afternoon drive anchor for KFWB, an all-news radio station in Los Angeles.

Savage has covered the Heidi Fleiss and O. J. Simpson civil trials. During the O. J. Simpson trial, Savage was called to the witness stand to reveal her confidential sources, and was threatened with jail time by Judge Ito, but she invoked her rights as journalist to use the shield law to protect the source of her story.

== Filmography ==
- Little House on the Prairie (1974) (TV) - Christy
- Hurricane (1974) (TV) – Liz Damon
- Terror on the 40th Floor (1974) (TV) – Cathy Pierson
- The Legend of Lizzie Borden (1975) (TV) – Young Lizzie
- Friendly Persuasion (1975) (TV) – Mattie
- The Devil and Max Devlin (1981) – Pammy
- Friday the 13th Part III (1982) – Debbie
- Loretta (2005) – Loretta
- Crystal Lake Memories: The Complete History of Friday the 13th (2013) – Herself (documentary film)
- The Bone Collector (2014) – Alice Hardy
- 13 Fanboy (2021) – Herself
