= Sweet Sixteen (1982 film) =

1983 American slasher film by Jim Sotos

- Theatrical release poster
- Directed by: Jim Sotos
- Written by: Erwin Goldman
- Produced by: Jim Sotos
- Starring: Bo Hopkins; Susan Strasberg; Aleisa Shirley; Patrick Macnee
- Cinematography: James L. Carter
- Edited by: Drake Silliman
- Music by: Ray Ellis; Tommy Vig
- Production companies: Sweet Sixteen Productions; Productions Two
- Distributed by: Century International
- Release date: November 12, 1982
- Running time: 90 minutes
- Country: United States
- Language: English

Sweet Sixteen is a 1982 American slasher film directed by Jim Sotos and starring Bo Hopkins, Susan Strasberg, Aleisa Shirley, Patrick Macnee, Don Stroud, Dana Kimmell, and Steve Antin. The film follows a teenage girl who moves to a small Texas town, after which a series of brutal murders plague the young men there. Don Shanks, Sharon Farrell, and Michael Pataki appear in supporting roles.

Principal photography of Sweet Sixteen took place in Southern California in Piru and Antelope Valley in 1981. The film was given a limited regional release in November 1982 by the independent film distributor Century International before expanding in 1983. The film received largely unfavorable reviews from film critics but was a moderate commercial hit, performing particularly well in south Florida, where it ranked among the top theatrical releases in December 1983.

== Plot ==
In a small town in Texas, Native American Jason Longshadow is harassed by racist patrons of a local bar, spurring a physical altercation. As Jason leaves, 15-year-old Melissa Morgan arrives, having just moved there and become lost. Jason warns her that she is in a seedy part of town and urges her to leave. Locals Hank Burke and Johnny Franklin interrupt the conversation, and Johnny offers to give Melissa a ride home, leaving Hank to walk. Johnny takes Melissa to a rural location, and the two begin to make out. However, Melissa asks him to bring her home after he tells her they are at the site of an Indian burial ground. While parked outside Melissa's house, Melissa tells Johnny that they have moved there because her father, John, is an archaeologist overseeing a local excavation of Native American artifacts, and that her mother, Joanne, was raised in the area. En route home, Johnny's truck breaks down. He begins walking, only to be stabbed to death by an unseen assailant.

Dan Burke, Hank's dad, who is also the local sheriff, receives a call from Billy Franklin, Johnny's older brother, a drunkard, about Johnny not coming home the night before. Dan takes Hank and his sister Marci to look for Johnny's truck. They soon locate it, and Marci stumbles upon Johnny's butchered corpse in a pile of underbrush. At school, Dan gets permission from Melissa's parents to question her about the events of the night before. Melissa recalls her encounter with Jason, who has coincidentally been hired to assist on John's archeological dig. Dan and John question Jason, but Jason explains that his conversation with Melissa was innocuous.

At school, Melissa meets Tommy Jackson, and they make plans to meet behind Earl's bar. While Tommy waits for Melissa, he is stabbed to death by the unseen assailant. Melissa arrives and is startled outside the bar by an elderly Native man, Greyfeather, causing her to knock over a stack of boxes, revealing Tommy's bloody corpse. Police arrive, and Melissa blames Greyfeather for Tommy's murder. Dan visits Greyfeather's home to question him, but finds him hanging in his house. Greyfeather's death is ruled a suicide, but Dan suspects local bigots may have murdered him. After Greyfeather's funeral, Marci confronts Melissa and blames her for his death, accusing her of lying. Marci swiftly feels remorseful for her harsh words, and the two eventually become friends.

John files a police report against Jason for theft, accusing him of stealing several knives from the archeological dig, causing suspicion to fall on Jason for the rash of killings. Dan goes to question Jason, but finds his house empty. In a trunk, Dan locates the blood-stained stolen knives, and Jason is arrested. With the help of Kathy Hopkins, a local archivist, Dan spends the evening researching the county records of murders that have occurred in the area. While doing so, he learns that the blood found on the knives is of animal origin, leading Dan to believe Jason is innocent. Meanwhile, Jason escapes the jail and goes to confront Billy and his friend, Jimmy, about Greyfeather's death.

Meanwhile, Joanne throws a barbecue that night to celebrate Melissa's 16th birthday, which both Hank and Marci attend. Melissa sneaks away with Hank to go skinny dipping at a lake, where Jimmy and Billy spy upon them. Jason stumbles onto the scene and gets into a fight with the two men, resulting in Jason being knocked unconscious. Melissa witnesses this and is attacked and sexually harassed by the drunk Jimmy and Billy. Hank attempts to rescue her, but is knocked out by Jimmy, before Billy also renders Melissa unconscious. Moments later, the unseen assailant stabs both Jimmy and Billy to death.

Marci ventures into the woods to look for Melissa and Hank and stumbles upon Jimmy and Billy's bodies. She subsequently finds Joanne in a catatonic state, kneeling over Melissa, who lay unconscious on the ground beside Hank. Joanne produces a butcher knife and aims to stab Marci, but stops when Dan arrives seconds later. It is revealed that Joanne is Tricia, Joanne's deceased sister, who committed suicide in a psychiatric hospital years prior, following years of sexual abuse by their father. Tricia murdered their father to avenge Joanne's abuse, and assumed Joanne's identity after she died. Dan attempts to reason with the raving Tricia, but she kills herself by driving the knife through her chest just as Melissa awakens.

Paramedics and police arrive at the Morgans' property to recover the bodies as the partygoers slowly scatter. Marci and Hank attempt to comfort a withdrawn Melissa outside. Melissa is impervious and slowly walks into her house alone in a daze. As she enters the front door, she brandishes a bloody knife, which she has concealed under the blanket wrapped around her.

== Cast ==
- Bo Hopkins as Sheriff Dan Burke
- Susan Strasberg as Joanne Morgan
- Patrick Macnee as Dr. John Morgan
- Don Stroud as Billy Franklin
- Dana Kimmell as Marci Burke
- Don Shanks as Jason Longshadow
- Aleisa Shirley as Melissa Morgan
- Steve Antin as Hank Burke
- Sharon Farrell as Kathy Hopkins
- Logan Clarke as Jimmy
- Michael Pataki as George Martin
- Henry Wilcoxon as Greyfeather
- Larry Storch as Earl
- Michael Cutt as Frank (as Michael J. Cutt)
- Glenn Withrow as Johnny Franklin
- Tony Perfit as Tommy Jackson

== Production ==
=== Casting ===
The casting of Susan Strasberg, Bo Hopkins, and Sharon Farrell was announced in mid-1981. Leslie Nielsen was originally cast in the role of Dr. John Morgan, but was replaced by Patrick Macnee due to schedule conflicts.

Aleisa Shirley was cast in the film in her feature debut after being discovered by talent agent Joyce Selznick while she was working as a restaurant hostess in Los Angeles. Shirley met director Jim Sotos while dropping off a headshot at his Burbank office, and he offered her a role in the film.

=== Filming ===
Principal photography of Sweet Sixteen took place largely in Piru, California in the fall of 1981. The film's school sequences were shot at a high school in Antelope Valley in a locale that actress Aleisa Shirley characterized as a "ghost town." The film's opening bar sequence was shot at an actual tavern in Orange County, whil the climactic sequence was partly filmed in a state park near Malibu.

== Music ==
The film's score was composed by Ray Ellis and Tommy Vig. The film also features an original theme song, "Melissa", performed by Frank Sparks.

== Release ==
The film was given a regional limited theatrical release in the United States by Century International, screening in San Antonio, Texas beginning November 12, 1982. After this release, the producers considered changing the film's title to Sweet Melissa.

The film had staggered regional releases in early 1983, opening in Anniston, Alabama on January 28, in Biloxi, Mississippi on April 19, and on August 5, 1983 in Detroit, Michigan. During the week ending December 14, 1983, the film was the seventh-most popular theatrical release in south Florida.

On October 11, 2018, a new digitally-restored print of the film was reissued theatrically for one night as a double feature with The Convent (2000); the screening was part of Bloody Disgusting's "Retro Nightmares" series, via Atom Events.

=== Alternate versions ===
The theatrical version of the film released in the United States features an opening dream sequence in which Dana Kimmell's character is reading a murder mystery novel in a lavish parlor. In the original director's cut, which was released internationally, the film instead opens with a sequence featuring Melissa (Aleisa Shirley) showering, along with a panning shot of her bedroom in which a tarot deck is seen strewn on the floor, with the Death card displayed.

=== Home media ===
Vestron Video released Sweet Sixteen on VHS and Betamax in 1983.

A director's cut of the film was released on DVD in the United States by Code Red in 2008. Code Red also issued a limited Blu-ray release in the United States on August 11, 2015. On September 1, 2026, Vinegar Syndrome announced a forthcoming 4K UHD Blu-ray release, made available through their official website with a general retailer street date of October 27, 2026. This edition features both the theatrical cut and an alternate director's cut (labeled the "international version") of the film.

== Reception ==
=== Critical response ===
The Sacramento Bee critic George Williams panned the film as a "blood-spattered mess of a movie" that "boasts a cast of competent actors who must have been quite desperate to have agreed to appear in [it]." Bill Cosford of the Miami Herald praised the film's cast, but noted the subplot involving anti-Native American prejudice as "wholly gratuitous." Arthur Cabasos of the Abilene Reporter-News felt the film lacked excitement and was uninvolving despite its strong cast.

Twila J. Walker of The Sacramento Union praised the film for its restrained use of violence and added that Hopkins' performance "pull[s] this otherwise static film up above the average in its genre." Roger Calin of the Omaha World-Herald similarly commended the film's cast, adding: "Sweet Sixteen never becomes especially scary or gory, and seems a bit more intelligent than most of this kind of stuff."

In a review for eFilmCritic, Dr. Isaksson gave the film a positive review with much of his praise going towards the lead performances stating, "Ever like a film just because of the cast involved and the overall set up, no matter how ridiculous? This is my love/hate relationship with 1982's Sweet 16. I am a fan of the underground actor (who has been in a few aboveground movies) Steve Antin, (Jonathan Antin's much more endearing and talented brother). And good lord, I cannot express or explain how much I fancy the slasher ingenue Dana Kimmell. It was the beautiful brunette's co-starring role in this horror film that became the catalyst for her being cast by director Steve Miner for the epic 3D installment of the Jason cut em ups, Friday the 13th Part III. One look at Ms. Kimmell and he knew he had his replacement for Amy Steel. So certainly it comes as no shocker that in Sweet 16 Dana shows off some serious screaming ability and for this film, it was a handy talent. Now, all this being stated, I am not hinting that these above mentioned horror films are really anything more than pure drivel but damn, what a nice looking spot of drool it is."

== Sources ==
- Whitehead, Mark (2001). Slasher Movies. Harpenden, England: The Pocket Essentials. ISBN 978-1-903-04727-9.
