= Sunny Jim (peanut butter) =

Brand of peanut butter

Sunny Jim was the name of a brand of peanut butter produced in the Seattle area. It was manufactured in Seattle, Washington, by the Pacific Standard Foods company. The company was founded by Germanus Wilhelm Firnstahl in 1921 after he moved to Seattle from Wisconsin and bought a peanut roaster. Firnstahl based the apple-cheeked character seen on the jars on his son, Lowell, after taking photos of all his children and selecting the best photograph as model (allegedly because Lowell was the only child with all his teeth at the time). During the 1950s the brand accounted for nearly a third of all peanut butter sold in the Seattle area. The company was sold in 1979 for $3 million to the Bristol Bay Native Corp. A large sign on the factory building, which Firnstahl had purchased during the Great Depression, made the "Sunny Jim building" on Airport Way South a familiar landmark to motorists passing on nearby Interstate 5. In 1997, there was a fire at this plant (by then owned by the city of Seattle) which destroyed the sign and a portion of the building. On September 20, 2010, a massive fire finished off the Sunny Jim plant as well as a vacant building on the factory site. The main advertisement for Sunny Jim was "Sunny Jim has underground peanuts with a flavor that's outta sight".
