= Jim Sotos =

American film director

- Born: Dimitri Sotirakis; New York City, U.S.
- Occupations: Film producer, film director

Jim Sotos (né Sotirakis) was an American film director active in the 1970s and 1980s. He is known for directing several horror films, including Forced Entry (1975) and Sweet Sixteen (1982).

== Biography ==
Sotos, born Dimitri Sotirakis, was raised in Staten Island, New York. He graduated from New Dorp High School on Staten Island.

Prior to becoming a filmmaker, Sotos was a guitarist who performed with his brother, Tony, in a jazz group based in Chicago.

Sotos directed the 1975 film Forced Entry, Sweet Sixteen (1982), Hot Moves (1985), and Beverly Hills Brats (1989). He was also a producer and on other films such as Texas Lightning.
