= Expanded universe =

Non-linear additions with consistency to the fictional universe

The term expanded universe, sometimes called an extended universe, is generally used to denote the "extension" of a media franchise (like a television program or a series of feature films) with other media, generally comics and original novels. This typically involves new stories for existing characters already developed within the franchise, but in some cases entirely new characters and complex mythology are developed. This is not necessarily the same as an adaptation, which is a retelling of the same story that may or may not adhere to the accepted canon. It is contrasted with a sequel that merely continues the previous narrative in a linear sequence. Nearly every media franchise with a committed fan base has some form of expanded universe.

== Naming ==
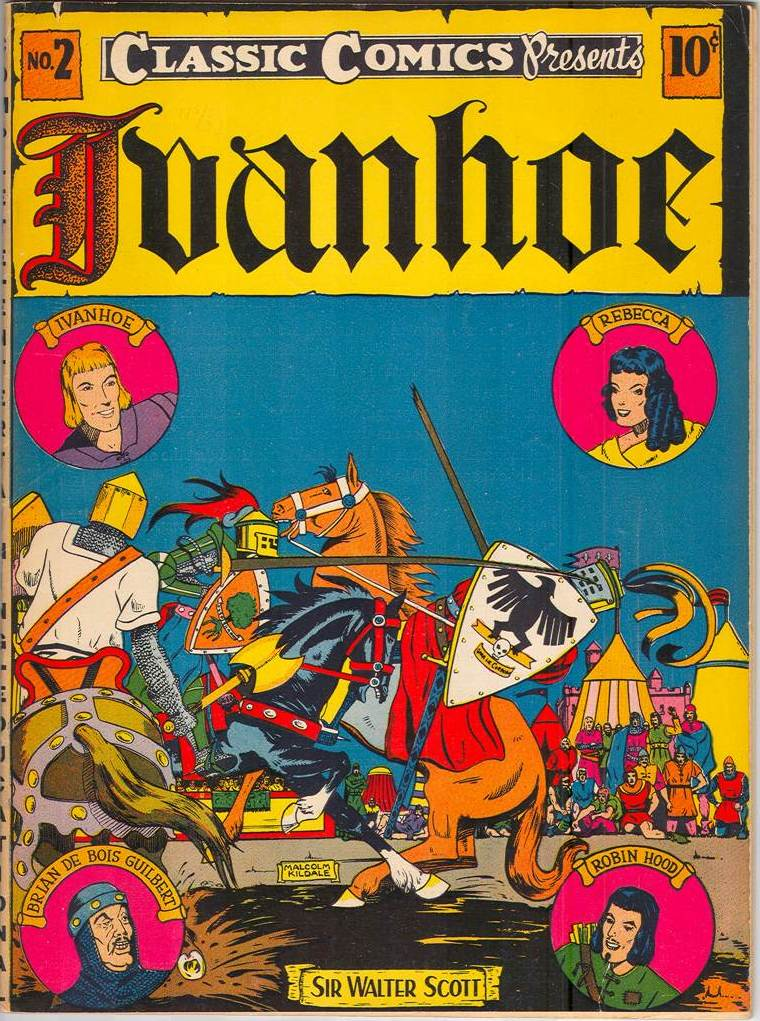
Ivanhoe in comic format

The phrase "Expanded Universe" was used to title the 1980 book of the same name by Robert A. Heinlein. In 1996 the phrase was used to brand a line of Star Wars action figures by Kenner (a division of Hasbro), and came to refer to in-universe material written previously by Alan Dean Foster, Timothy Zahn, roleplaying game authors and others.

== Examples ==
Two prominent examples of media franchises with an expanded universe are Star Wars and Star Trek, which both have a wide range of original novels, comics, video games, and other media that add to the mythology of their fictional universe in different ways. In both cases, entirely new characters and situations have been developed that exist only within the expanded universe media.

== Canonicity ==
Although there are some exceptions, expanded universe works are generally accepted as canon, or part of the "official" storyline continuity. Otherwise, they are considered apocrypha. In some cases, characters created for an expanded universe are later featured in the primary works associated with that franchise, as in the cases of Aayla Secura and Grand Admiral Thrawn in the Star Wars franchise. When all expanded universe works (films, novels, comic books, video games, role-playing games, etc.) are considered canonical, then the expanded universe is an "imaginary entertainment environment."

== See also ==
- Buffyverse
- Star Wars expanded universe
- View Askewniverse
- Whoniverse
- Fan fiction
- Parallel novel – Pastiche novel with in-universe continuity
- Sequel – Continuation of a previous work
