= Novelization =

Adaptation of another work into a novel

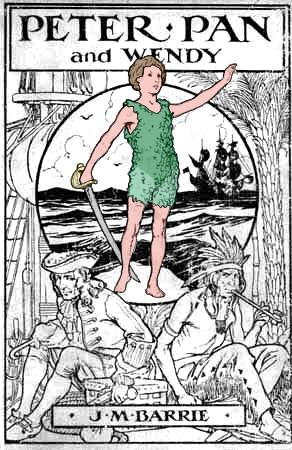
1915 novelization of the original 1904 play Peter and Wendy

A novelization (or novelisation) is a derivative novel that adapts the story of a work created for another medium, such as a film, TV series, stage play, comic book, or video game. Film novelizations were particularly popular before the advent of home video, but continue to find commercial success as part of marketing campaigns for major films. They are often written by accomplished writers based on an early draft of the film's script and on a tight deadline.

== History and purpose ==
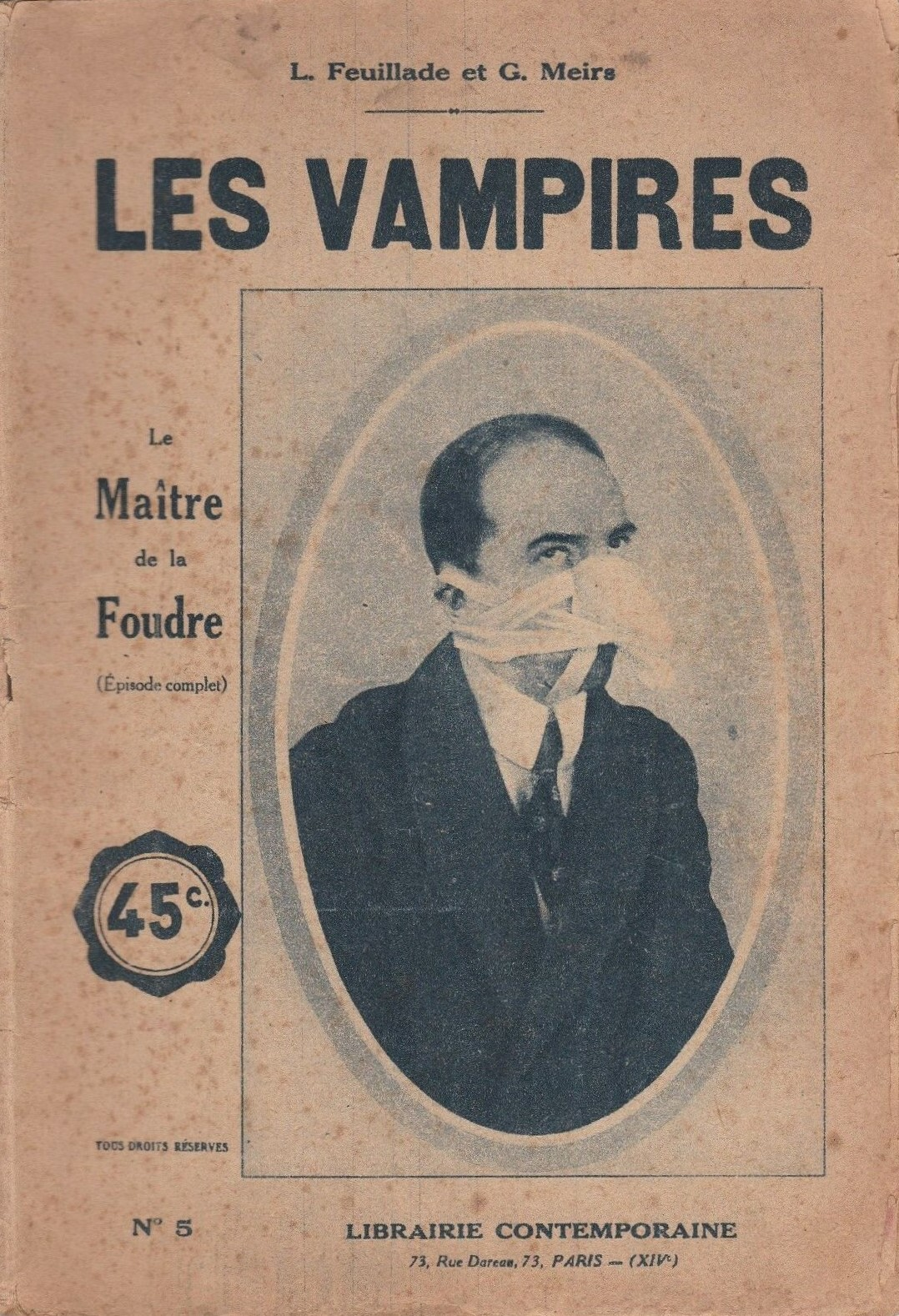
Novelization of chapter 8 of the film series Les Vampires (1915–16)

Novelizations of films began to be produced in the 1910s and 1920s for silent films such as Les Vampires (1915–16) and London After Midnight (1927). One of the first films with spoken dialogue to be novelized was King Kong (1933). Film novelizations were especially profitable during the 1970s before home video became available, as they were then the only way to re-experience popular movies other than television airing or a rerelease in theaters. The novelizations of Star Wars (1977), Alien (1979) and Star Trek: The Motion Picture (1979) sold millions of copies.

The first ever video game to be novelised was Shadowkeep, in 1984.

Even after the advent of home video, film novelizations remain popular, with the adaptation of Godzilla (2014) being included on The New York Times Best Seller list for mass-market paperbacks. This has been attributed to these novels' appeal to fans: about 50% of novelizations are sold to people who have watched the film and want to explore its characters further, or to reconnect to the enthusiasm they experienced when watching the film. A film is therefore also a sort of commercial for its novelization; the film's success or failure affects the novelization's sales. Conversely, film novelizations help generate publicity for upcoming films, serving as a link in the film's marketing chain.

According to publishing industry estimates, about one or two percent of the audience of a film will buy its novelization. This makes these relatively inexpensively produced works a commercially attractive proposition in the case of blockbuster film franchises. The increasing number of previously established novelists taking on tie-in works has been credited with these works gaining a "patina of respectability" after they had previously been disregarded in literary circles as derivative and mere merchandise.

== Variants ==
=== Film ===
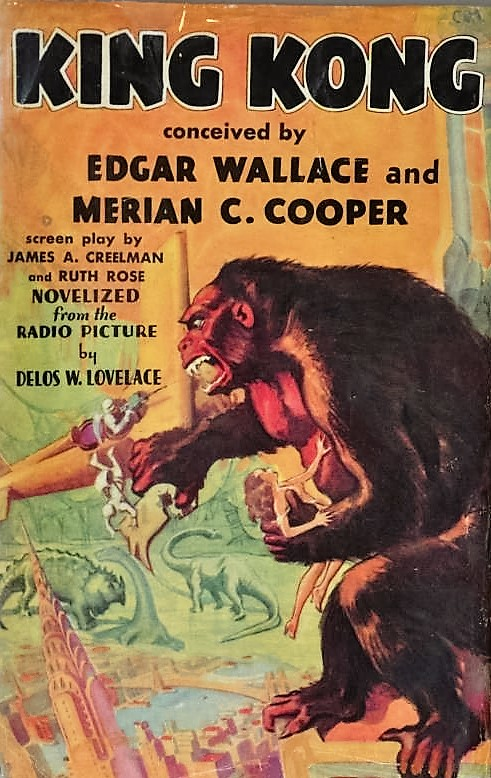
King Kong (1932) novelization of King Kong (1933). The novel was based on the screenplay and was marketing for the film which was released two months later.

The writer of a novelization is supposed to multiply the 20,000–25,000 words of a screenplay into at least 60,000 words. Writers usually achieve that by adding description or introspection. Ambitious writers are driven to work on transitions and characters just to accomplish "a more prose-worthy format". Sometimes the "novelizer" invents new scenes in order to give the plot "added dimension", provided they are allowed to do that. Publishers aim to have novelizations in shops before a film is released, which means it is usually necessary to base the novelization on a screenplay instead of the completed film. It might take an insider to tell whether a novelization diverges unintentionally from the final film because it is based on an earlier version which included deleted scenes. Thus the novelization occasionally presents material which will later on appear in a director's cut. In some cases, separate novelizations of the same film are written for publication in different countries, and these may be based on different drafts of the screenplay, as was very clearly the case with the American and British novelizations of Capricorn One. Writers select different approaches to enrich a screenplay. Dewey Gram's Gladiator, for example, included historical background information.

If a film is based on a novel, the original novel is generally reissued with a cover based on the film's poster. If a film company also wishes to have a separate novelization published, the company is supposed to approach the author who has "Separated Rights". A writer has these rights if he contributed the source material (or added a great deal of creative input to it) and if he was moreover properly credited.

Novelizations also exist where the film itself is based on an original novel: novelist and screenwriter Christopher Wood wrote a novelization of the James Bond film The Spy Who Loved Me. Although the 1962 Ian Fleming novel was still available in bookstores, its story had nothing to do with the 1977 film. To avoid confusion, Wood's novelization was titled James Bond, the Spy Who Loved Me. This novel is also an example of a screenwriter novelizing his own screenplay. Star Wars: From the Adventures of Luke Skywalker was published under the name of George Lucas but his script had been novelized by the prolific tie-in writer Alan Dean Foster.

Acquiring editors looking for a novelizer have different issues. The author may not have all of the information needed; Foster wrote the Alien novelization without knowing what the Xenomorph looked like. The contract may be very restrictive; Max Allan Collins had to write the novelization for Road to Perdition only based on the film, without the detail he had created for the graphic novel of the same name that the film is based on. Rewrites of scripts may force last-minute novelization rewrites. The script for the 1966 film Modesty Blaise was rewritten by five different authors. The writer or script doctor responsible for the so-called "final" version is not necessarily the artist who has contributed the original idea or most of the scenes. The patchwork character of a film script might even exacerbate because the film director, a principal actor or a consulting script doctor does rewrites during the shooting. An acquiring editor who intends to hire one of the credited screenwriters has to reckon that the early writers are no longer familiar with the current draft or work already on another film script. Not every screenwriter is available, willing to work for less money than what can be earned with film scripts and able to deliver the required amount of prose on time. Even if so, there is still the matter of novelizations having a questionable reputation. The International Association of Media Tie-In Writers concedes that by saying their craft is "largely unrecognized". Writers Guild of America rules require that screenwriters have right of first refusal to write novelizations of their own films, but they rarely do so because of the lack of prestige and money.

Some novels blur the line between a novelization and an original novel that is the basis of a film adaptation. Arthur C. Clarke provided the ideas for Stanley Kubrick's 2001: A Space Odyssey. Based on his own short stories and his cooperation with Kubrick during the preparation and making of this film adaptation he wrote the film novelization of the same name which is appreciated by fans because the film provides little exposition, and the novelization fills in some blanks. David Morrell wrote the novel First Blood about John Rambo, which led to the film adaptation of the same name. Although Rambo dies at the end of his original story, Morrell had a paragraph in his contract stipulating he remained "the only person who could write books about Rambo". This paid off for him when the film producers changed the ending and decided for a sequel. David Morrell accepted to carry out the novelization and negotiated unprecedented liberties which resulted in a likewise unprecedented success when his book entered The New York Times Best Seller list and stayed there for six weeks.

Simon Templar or James Bond are examples of media franchises that have been popular for more than one generation. When the feature film The Saint was released in 1997 the creator of this character (Leslie Charteris) had already been dead for four years. Hence its novelization had to be written by another author. Ian Fleming on the other hand had official successors who wrote contemporary "Post-Fleming" James Bond novels. During his tenure John Gardner was consequently chosen to write the novelization of Licence to Kill in 1989 and also the novelization of GoldenEye in 1995. John Gardner found his successor in Raymond Benson who wrote besides several original Bond novels three novelizations including The World Is Not Enough.

=== Comics ===
While comic books such as the series Classics Illustrated have often provided adaptations of novels, novelizations of comics are relatively rare. The Adventures of Superman, written by George Lowther and published in 1942, is the first novelization of a comic book character.

=== Video games ===
Video games are novelized in the same manner as films. While gamers might enjoy playing a certain action scene for hours, the buyers of a novelization might be bored soon if they merely read about such a scene. Consequently, the writer will have to cut down on the action.

== Authors ==
Novelization writers are often also accomplished original fiction writers, as well as fans of the works they adapt, which helps motivate them to undertake a commission that is generally compensated with a relatively low flat fee. Alan Dean Foster, for example, said that, as a fan, "I got to make my own director's cut. I got to fix the science mistakes, I got to enlarge on the characters, if there was a scene I particularly liked, I got to do more of it, and I had an unlimited budget. So it was fun".

Writing skill is particularly needed for challenging situations common to writing novelizations of popular media, such as lack of access to information about the film, last-minute script changes and very quick turnaround times. Collins had to write the novelization of In the Line of Fire in nine days.

Although novelizations tend to have a low prestige, and are often viewed as "hackwork", several critically acclaimed literary authors have written novelizations, including Arthur Calder-Marshall, William Kotzwinkle and Richard Elman. Best-selling author Ken Follett, early in his career, also wrote a novelization, and so did Isaac Asimov, later in his career. While increasingly also a domain of previously established novelists, tie-in writing still has the disadvantages, from the writers' point of view, of modest pay, tight deadlines and no ownership in the intellectual property created.

The International Association of Media Tie-In Writers is an American association that aims to recognize the writers of adapted and tie-in fiction. It hands out annual awards, the "Scribes", in categories including "best adapted novel".

=== TV series ===
Doctor Who had stories novelised in particular from the era of its original series published by Target Books.

Episodes of Star Trek were adapted into short stories by the noted science fiction writer James Blish. Each volume of the stories included a number of the short story adaptations. Alan Dean Foster would later adapt the follow-up animated series into the Star Trek Log series.

Mel Gilden wrote novelizations of Beverly Hills, 90210, merging three episodes into one book. As he explained, this approach required him to look for a joint story arc.

=== Comics ===
In the early 1970s Lee Falk was asked by the Avon publishing house to deliver Phantom novels based on the eponymous comic strip. Falk worked on the novelizations on his own and with collaboration. A dispute over how he would be credited led to the cessation of the series.

Peter O'Donnell, who scripted the Modesty Blaise comic strip, later authored novels featuring the character not directly based on the stories presented in the strips.

=== Video games ===
Matt Forbeck became a writer of novels based on video games after he had been "writing tabletop roleplaying game books for over a decade". He worked also as a designer of video games.

S. D. Perry wrote a series of novels based on the Resident Evil video games and added tie-ins to the novelizations, covering all the mainline titles in the series up until Resident Evil Zero.

Eric Nylund introduced a new concept for a novelization when he delivered a trilogy, consisting of a prequel titled Halo: The Fall of Reach, an actual novelization titled Halo: First Strike and a sequel titled Halo: Ghosts of Onyx.

Raymond Benson novelized the original Metal Gear Solid in 2008 and its sequel Metal Gear Solid 2: Sons of Liberty, while Project Itoh wrote a Japanese-language novelization of Metal Gear Solid 4: Guns of the Patriots also in 2008 (with an English adaptation later published in 2012). Itoh was set to write novelizations of Metal Gear Solid 3: Snake Eater and Metal Gear Solid: Peace Walker, but his death in 2009 resulted in these projects being handed to Beatless author Satoshi Hase and a new writer named Hitori Nojima (a pen name for Kenji Yano) respectively. Kojima would go on to write Metal Gear Solid: Substance (a two-part alternate novelization of the original Metal Gear Solid and Metal Gear Solid 2), as well as the novelizations of Metal Gear Solid V: The Phantom Pain and Death Stranding (a game which he helped write the script for).

== Orphaned novelizations ==
In some cases an otherwise standard novel may be based on an unfilmed screenplay. Ian Fleming's 1961 James Bond novel Thunderball was based on a script he had co-written; in this case his collaborators subsequently sued for plagiarism.

Peter O'Donnell's novel Modesty Blaise was a novelization of a refused film script. In this case the creator of the main character had written the script alone, but later on other authors had changed O'Donnell's original script over and over, until merely one single sentence remained from the original. The novel was released a year before the film and unlike the film it had sequels.

Frederick Forsyth's 1979 novel The Devil's Alternative was based on an unfilmed script he had written.

Cormac McCarthy's 2005 novel No Country for Old Men was adapted from a screenplay the author wrote. This allowed the Coen brothers to stick "almost word for word" faithfully to the book when adapting it back into a screenplay for the acclaimed 2007 film of the same name.

Occasionally a novelization is issued even though the film is never made. Gordon Williams wrote the script and novelization for producer Harry Saltzman's abandoned film The Micronauts.

== Lists of novelizations ==
=== Novels based on comics ===
- List of novels based on comics

=== Novels based on films ===
==== Novels by franchise ====
Franchise	Title	Author(s)	ISBN	Publisher	Notes
Back to the Future	Back to the Future (1985)	George Gipe	ISBN 9780425082058	Berkley Books	Novelization of the film.
Back to the Future	Back to the Future Part II (1989)	Craig Shaw Gardner	ISBN 9780425118757	Berkley Books	Novelization of the film.
Back to the Future	Back to the Future Part III (1990)	Craig Shaw Gardner	ISBN 9780425122402	Berkley Books	Novelization of the film.
Bad News Bears	The Bad News Bears (1976)	Richard Woodley	ISBN 9780440908234	Dell Publishing	Novelization of the film.
Bad News Bears	The Bad News Bears in Breaking Training (1977)	Richard Woodley	ISBN 9780440104179	Dell Publishing	Novelization of the film.
Bad News Bears	The Bad News Bears Go to Japan (1978)	Richard Woodley	ISBN 9780440104278	Dell Publishing	Novelization of the film.
Blade Runner	Blade Runner: A Story of the Future (1982)	Les Martin	ISBN 9780394853031	Random House	Novelization of the film.
Blade Runner	Blade Runner 2: The Edge of Human (1995)	K. W. Jeter	ISBN 9780553099799	Bantam Books	Sequel novel to the original film.
Blade Runner	Blade Runner 3: Replicant Night (1996)	K. W. Jeter	ISBN 9780553099836	Spectra	Second sequel novel to the original film.
Blade Runner	Blade Runner 4: Eye and Talon (2000)	K. W. Jeter	ISBN 9780575068650	Gollancz	Third sequel novel to the original film.
Dollars Trilogy	A Fistful of Dollars (1972)	Frank Chandler	ISBN 9780426064022	Tandem	Novelization of the film.
Dollars Trilogy	For a Few Dollars More (1965)	Joe Millard	ISBN 9780426013617	Award Books	Novelization of the film.
Dollars Trilogy	The Good, the Bad and the Ugly (1967)	Joe Millard	ISBN 9780426139959	Award Books	Novelization of the film.
Dollars Trilogy	A Dollar to Die For (1967)	Brian Fox	ISBN 9780426034209	Award Books	Original novel.
Dollars Trilogy	A Coffin Full of Dollars (1971)	Joe Millard	ISBN 9780352307446	Award Books	Original novel.
Dollars Trilogy	The Devil's Dollar Sign (1972)	Joe Millard	ISBN 9780426140313	Award Books	Original novel.
Dollars Trilogy	Blood for a Dirty Dollar (1973)	Joe Millard	ISBN 9780352304711	Award Books	Original novel.
Dollars Trilogy	The Million-Dollar Bloodhunt (1973)	Joe Millard	ISBN 9780352307453	Award Books	Original novel.
E.T. the Extra-Terrestrial	E.T. the Extra-Terrestrial (1982)	William Kotzwinkle		Berkley Books	Novelization of the film.
E.T. the Extra-Terrestrial	E.T.: The Book of the Green Planet (1985)	William Kotzwinkle	ISBN 9780425080016	Berkley Books	Sequel novel, published three years after the original film.
Friday the 13th	Friday the 13th Part 3 3-D (1982)	Michael Avallone	ISBN 9780352312495	Tower & Leisure Sales Co.	First novelization of the film.
Friday the 13th	Jason Lives: Friday the 13th Part VI (1986)	Simon Hawke	ISBN 9780451146410	Signet	Novelization of the film.
Friday the 13th	Friday the 13th (1987)	Simon Hawke	ISBN 9780451150899	Signet	Novelization of the 1980 film.
Friday the 13th	Friday the 13th Part II (1988)	Simon Hawke	ISBN 9780451153371	Signet	Novelization of the film.
Friday the 13th	Friday the 13th Part III (1988)	Simon Hawke	ISBN 9780451153111	Signet	Second novelization of the film.
Friday the 13th	Friday the 13th: Mother's Day (1994)	William Pattinson (as Eric Morse)	ISBN 9780425142929	Berkley Books	Camp Crystal Lake series; the fifth installment was published as e-book; self-published by the author.
Friday the 13th	Friday the 13th: Jason's Curse (1994)	William Pattinson (as Eric Morse)		Berkley Books	Camp Crystal Lake series; the fifth installment was published as e-book; self-published by the author.
Friday the 13th	Friday the 13th: The Carnival (1994)	William Pattinson (as Eric Morse)		Berkley Books	Camp Crystal Lake series; the fifth installment was published as e-book; self-published by the author.
Friday the 13th	Friday the 13th: Road Trip (1994)	William Pattinson (as Eric Morse)		Berkley Books	Camp Crystal Lake series; the fifth installment was published as e-book; self-published by the author.
Friday the 13th	Friday the 13th: The Mask of Jason Voorhees (2011)	William Pattinson (as Eric Morse)	None	Berkley Books	Camp Crystal Lake series; the fifth installment was published as e-book; self-published by the author.
Friday the 13th	Freddy vs. Jason (2005)	Stephen Hand			Novelization of the film.
Friday the 13th	Jason X (2005)	Pat Cadigan			Novelization of the film.
Friday the 13th	Jason X: The Experiment (2005)	Pat Cadigan	ISBN 9781844161690	Black Flame	Jason X series
Friday the 13th	Jason X: Planet of the Beast (2005)	Nancy Kilpatrick		Black Flame	Jason X series
Friday the 13th	Jason X: Death Moon (2005)	Alex Johnson		Black Flame	Jason X series
Friday the 13th	Jason X: To the Third Power (2006)	Nancy Kilpatrick		Black Flame	Jason X series
Friday the 13th	Friday the 13th: Church of the Divine Psychopath (2005)	Scott Phillips	ISBN 9781844161812	Black Flame	Friday the 13th series
Friday the 13th	Friday the 13th: Hell Lake (2005)	Paul Woods		Black Flame	Friday the 13th series
Friday the 13th	Friday the 13th: Hate-Kill-Repeat (2005)	Jason Arnopp		Black Flame	Friday the 13th series
Friday the 13th	Friday the 13th: The Jason Strain (2006)	Chris Faust		Black Flame	Friday the 13th series
Friday the 13th	Friday the 13th: Carnival of Maniacs (2006)	Stephen Hand		Black Flame	Friday the 13th series
Ghostbusters	Ghostbusters (1984)	Larry Milne	ISBN 9780727811936	Coronet Books	Novelization of the 1984 film.
Ghostbusters	Ghostbusters: The Return (2004)	Sholly Fisch	ISBN 9780743479486	I Books	Non-canon alternate sequel to Ghostbusters and Ghostbusters II.
Halloween	Halloween (1979)	Curtis Richards	ISBN 9780553132267	Bantam Books	Novelization of the 1978 film.
Halloween	Halloween II (1981)	Jack Martin	ISBN 9780890838648	Zebra	Novelization of the film.
Halloween	Halloween III: Season of the Witch (1982)	Jack Martin	ISBN 9780515068856	Jove Books	Novelization of the film.
Halloween	Halloween IV (1988)	Nicholas Grabowsky	ISBN 9781555472924	Critic's Choice Paperbacks	Novelization of the film Halloween 4: The Return of Michael Myers.
Halloween	Halloween: The Scream Factory (1997)	Kelly O'Rourke	ISBN 9781572972988	Boulevard Books	Original novel.
Halloween	Halloween: The Old Myers Place (1997)	Kelly O'Rourke	ISBN 9781572973411	Boulevard Books	Original novel.
Halloween	Halloween: The Mad House (1998)	Kelly O'Rourke	ISBN 9781572973428	Boulevard Books	Original novel.
Halloween	Halloween (2018)	John Passarella			Novelization of the 2018 film.
Halloween	Halloween Kills (2021)	Tim Waggoner	ISBN 9781789096019	Titan Books	Novelization of the 2021 film.
Halloween	Halloween Ends (2022)	Paul Brad Logan	ISBN 9781803361703	Titan Books	Novelization of the 2022 film.
Happy Death Day	Happy Death Day & Happy Death Day 2U (2019)	Aaron Hartzler	ISBN 9781984897725	Anchor Books	Two novelizations in one volume.
Herbie	The Love Bug (1969)	Mel Cebulash	ISBN 9780590323086	Scholastic Book Services	Novelization of the film.
Herbie	Herbie Rides Again (1974)	Mel Cebulash	ISBN 9780590088213	Scholastic Book Services	Novelization of the film.
Herbie	Herbie Goes to Monte Carlo (1977)	Vic Crume	ISBN 9780590104029	Scholastic Book Services	Novelization of the film.
Herbie	Herbie Goes Bananas (1980)	Joe Claro	ISBN 9780590316095	Scholastic Book Services	Novelization of the film.
Herbie	Herbie: Fully Loaded (2005)	Irene Trimble	ISBN 9780736423236	Random House Children's Books	Junior novelization of the film.
Indiana Jones	Raiders of the Lost Ark (1981)	Campbell Black	ISBN 9780345353757	Del Rey Books	Novelization of the film.
Indiana Jones	Indiana Jones and the Temple of Doom (1984)	James Kahn	ISBN 9780345314574	Ballantine Books	Novelization of the film.
Indiana Jones	Indiana Jones and the Last Crusade (1989)	Rob MacGregor	ISBN 9780345361615	Ballantine Books	Novelization of the film.
Indiana Jones	Indiana Jones and the Kingdom of the Crystal Skull (2008)	James Rollins	ISBN 9780345501288	Del Rey	Novelization of the film.
It's Alive	It's Alive (1977)	Richard Woodley	ISBN 9780345258793	Ballantine Books	Novelization of the film.
It's Alive	It Lives Again (1978)	James Dixon	ISBN 9780345276933	Ballantine Books	Novelization of the film.
Jaws	Jaws 2 (1978)	Hank Searls	ISBN 9780553117080	Bantam Books	Novelization of the film.
Jaws	Jaws: The Revenge (1987)	Hank Searls	ISBN 9780425105467	Berkley Books	Novelization of the film.
James Bond	James Bond, the Spy Who Loved Me (1977)	Christopher Wood	ISBN 9780224014977	Jonathan Cape	Novelization of the film.
James Bond	James Bond and Moonraker (1979)	Christopher Wood	ISBN 9780224017343	Jonathan Cape	Novelization of the film.
King Kong	King Kong (1932)	Delos W. Lovelace		Grosset & Dunlap	Novelization of the 1933 film.
King Kong	King Kong (2005)	Christopher Golden	ISBN 9781416503910	Pocket Star Books	Novelization of the 2005 film.
Living Dead	Night of the Living Dead (1974)	John A. Russo	ISBN 9780446764100	Warner Paperback Library	Novelization of the 1968 film.
Living Dead	Return of the Living Dead (1977)	John A. Russo	ISBN 9780895590626	Dale Publishing	Alternate sequel novel to the 1968 film; later adapted to film as The Return of the Living Dead (1985).
Living Dead	Dawn of the Dead (1978)	George A. Romero; Susanna Sparrow	ISBN 9780312183936	St. Martin's Press	Novelization of the 1978 film.
Living Dead	The Living Dead (2020)	George A. Romero; Daniel Kraus	ISBN 9781250305121	Tor Books	Original novel.
Mad Max	Mad Max (1979)	Terry Kaye	ISBN 9780828260374	Circus Books	Novelization of the film.
Mad Max	Mad Max 2 (1981)	Carl Ruhan	ISBN 9780725511838	QB Books	Novelization of the film.
Mad Max	Mad Max Beyond Thunderdome (1985)	Joan D. Vinge	ISBN 9780446329514	Warner Books	Novelization of the film.
A Nightmare on Elm Street	The Nightmares on Elm Street Parts 1, 2, 3: The Continuing Story (1987)	Jeffrey Cooper	ISBN 9780312905170	St. Martin's Press	Novelization of the 1984 film and the sequels Freddy's Revenge and Dream Warriors.
A Nightmare on Elm Street	The Nightmares on Elm Street Parts 4 & 5 (1989)	Joseph Locke	ISBN 9780312917647	St. Martin's Press	Novelization of the films The Dream Master and The Dream Child.
A Nightmare on Elm Street	Wes Craven's New Nightmare (1994)	David Bergantino	ISBN 9780812551662	Tor Books	Novelization of the film.
The Omen	The Omen (1976)	David Seltzer	ISBN 9780860073710	Futura Books; Signet	Novelization of the 1976 film.
The Omen	Damien: Omen II (1978)	Joseph Howard	ISBN 9780708813584	Futura Books; Signet	Novelization of the film.
The Omen	The Final Conflict (1981)	Gordon McGill	ISBN 9780708819586	Futura Books; Signet	Novelization of the film.
The Omen	Omen IV: Armageddon 2000 (1983)	Gordon McGill	ISBN 9780708822753	Futura Books; Signet	First of two novels set after The Final Conflict, unrelated to the 1991 film Omen IV: The Awakening.
The Omen	Omen V: The Abomination (1985)	Gordon McGill	ISBN 9780708827451	Futura Books; Signet	Second of two novels set after The Final Conflict.
The Oz Books	The Scarecrow of Oz (1915)	L. Frank Baum	None	Reilly & Britton	Novelization of the 1914 silent film, His Majesty, the Scarecrow of Oz.
The Oz Books	Tik-Tok of Oz (1914)	L. Frank Baum	None	Reilly & Britton	Novelization of the 1913 play, The Tik-Tok Man of Oz.
The Oz Books	Return to Oz (1985)	Joan D. Vinge	ISBN 9780345322074	Ballantine Books	Novelization of the film.
The Oz Books	Return to Oz (1985)	Alistair Hedley	ISBN 9780140319576	Puffin Books	Junior novelization; published as part of the "Young Puffin" series.
The Pink Panther	The Pink Panther (1963)	Martin Albert	ISBN 9789765339211	Bantam Books	Novelization of the 1963 film.
The Pink Panther	The Return of the Pink Panther (1975)	Frank Waldman	ISBN 9780345251237	Ballantine Books; Futura Books	Novelization of the film.
The Pink Panther	The Pink Panther Strikes Again (1976)	Frank Waldman	ISBN 9780213166380	Ballantine Books; Futura Books	Novelization of the film.
The Pink Panther	The Pink Panther (2006)	Max Allan Collins			Novelization of the 2006 film.
Planet of the Apes	Beneath the Planet of the Apes (1970)	Michael Avallone	ISBN 9780553080339	Bantam Books	Novelization of the film.
Planet of the Apes	Escape from the Planet of the Apes (1971)	Jerry Pournelle		Award Books	Novelization of the film.
Planet of the Apes	Conquest of the Planet of the Apes (1972)	John Jakes	ISBN 9780095132411	Award Books	Novelization of the film.
Planet of the Apes	Battle for the Planet of the Apes (1973)	David Gerrold	ISBN 9780891901631	Award Books	Novelization of the film.
Rambo	Rambo: First Blood Part II (1985)	David Morrell	ISBN 9780515083996	Jove Books	Novelization of the film.
Rambo	Rambo III (1988)	David Morrell	ISBN 9780515093339	Jove Books	Novelization of the film.
The Shaggy Dog	The Shaggy Dog (1967)	Elizabeth L. Griffen	[none]	Scholastic Book Services	Novelization of the 1959 film.
The Shaggy Dog	The Shaggy D.A. (1976)	Vic Crume	ISBN 9780449136423	Fawcett Publications	Novelization of the film.
Species	Species (1995)	Yvonne Navarro	ISBN 9780553574043	Bantam Books	Novelization of the film.
Species	Species II (1998)	Yvonne Navarro	ISBN 9780812570755	Tom Doherty Associates, LLC	Novelization of the film.
Witch Mountain	Return from Witch Mountain (1978)	Alexander Key	ISBN 9780664326302	Westminster Press	Novelization of the film.
Witch Mountain	Race to Witch Mountain (2009)	James Ponti			Novelization of the film.

==== Standalone novels ====
Title	Author	Catalog / ISBN	Publisher	Date	Notes
Dr. Cyclops	Henry Kuttner	Catalog: 445-02485-060 (1967 paperback); ISBN: 0-445-02485-2 / 978-0-445-02485-4 (1967 paperback); 0-87818-013-3 / 978-0-87818-013-4 (1976 paperback)	Stellar Publishing (original); Phoenix Press (1940 hardback); Popular Library (1967 paperback); Centaur Books (1976 paperback)	June 1940 (original)	Novelization of the film, first published as a installment in the Thrilling Wonder Stories pulp magazine (June 1940).
Lady and the Tramp: The Story of Two Dogs	Ward Greene	53-10818	Simon & Schuster	1953	First novelization of the 1955 film, published two years before the release of the source film.
Monster Godzilla	Shigeru Kayama	[none] (original)	Iwatani Bookstore	October 25, 1954	Radio drama of the film Godzilla.
The Pit and the Pendulum	Lee Sheridan	71-303	Lancer Books	1961	Novelization of the film.
Blood Feast	Herschell Gordon Lewis	9780938782070	Novel Books	1964	Novelization of the film.
Two Thousand Maniacs!	Herschell Gordon Lewis	0938782088	Novel Books	1964	Novelization of the film.
The Story of Walt Disney's Motion Picture – Mary Poppins	Mary Virginia Carey	2317	Whitman Publishing Company	1964	Young adult novelization of the 1964 film.
The Story of Walt Disney's Motion Picture – The Jungle Book	Mary Virginia Carey	2726	Whitman Publishing Company	1967	Young adult novelization of the 1967 film.
House of Dark Shadows	Marilyn Ross	64-537	Paperback Library	October 1970	Novelization of the film.
THX 1138	Ben Bova	0446897116 / 978-0446897112	Paperback Library	1971	Novelization of the film.
Super Fly	Philip Fenty	034502818X	Sphere Books	1972	Novelization of the film.
Coffy	Paul W. Fairman	75487-095	Lancer Books	1973	Novelization of the film
That Darn Cat	The Gordons	0590086138 / 978-0590086134	Scholastic Book Services	1973	Novelization of the 1965 film, published eight years after the release of the source film.
Blazing Saddles	Tad Richards	0446765368	Warner Paperback Library	1974	Novelization of the film.>
Earthquake	George Fox	0-451-06264-7 / 978-0-451-06264-2	Signet Books	December 1974	Novelization of the film.
The Sugarland Express	Henry Clement	445-08276-125	Popular Library	1974	Novelization of the film.
Black Christmas	Lee Hays	445-08467-150	Popular Library	1976	Novelization of the film.
One of Our Dinosaurs Is Missing	John Harvey	0-45002-826-7 / 978-0-45002-826-7	New English Library	March 4, 1976	Novelization of the film.
Superdad	Ann Spanoghe	0-45003-143-8 / 978-0-45003-143-4	New English Library	November 1976	Novelization of the film.
The Three Caballeros	Jimmy Corinis	ISBN 0-45002-806-2 / ISBN 978-0-45002-806-9	New English Library	February 5, 1976	Second novelization of the 1944 film.
Walt Disney's Alice in Wonderland (1977)	Ann Spano	0-45003-278-7 / 978-0-45003-278-3 (UK)	New English Library (UK); Wonder Books (US)	February 3, 1977 (UK)	Novelization of the 1951 film of the same title.
Communion	Frank Lauria	0553112414	Random House Publishing	1977	Novelization of the film, better known as Alice, Sweet Alice.
Close Encounters of the Third Kind	Steven Spielberg, Leslie Waller	0-440-11433-0	Dell Books	1977	Novelization of the film.
Handle with Care	E. M. Corder	9780671811808	Pocket Books	1977	Novel "Citizen's Band" was original name of edited, re-titled and re-released film.
Treasure of Matecumbe	Derry Moffatt	0-45003-248-5 / 978-0-45003-248-6	New English Library	April 1977	Novelization of the film.
Orca	Arthur Herzog	067181138X / 9780671811389	Pocket Books	1977	Novelization of the film.
The Cat from Outer Space	Ted Key	067181740X / 978-0671560546	Pocket Books	June 1978	Novelization of the film.
The Deer Hunter	E. M. Corder	0896730352 / 9780896730359	Jove Books	1978	Novelization of the film.
Hot Lead and Cold Feet	Ted Sparks	0-59012-063-8 / 978-0-59012-063-0	Scholastic Book Services	1978	Novelization of the film.
In Search of the Castaways	Hettie Jones	0-67181-936-4 / 978-0-67181-936-1	Pocket Books	February 1978	Novelization of the film, published 16 years after the release of the source film.
Walt Disney's The Jungle Book (1978)	Jean Bethell	0448161079 / 9780448161075	Wonder Books (1978); Ottenheimer Publishers (1984)	1978, 1984	First junior novelization of the 1967 film.
Pete's Dragon (US)	Jean Bethell	044816101X / 978-0448161013	Wonder Books	1978	American novelization of the 1977 film.
Pete's Dragon (UK)	Dewy Moffatt	0-45003-837-8 / 978-0-45003-837-2	New English Library	October 1978	British novelization of the 1977 film.
Warlords of Atlantis	Paul Victor	0708813925 / 978-0708813928	Futura Books	1978	Novelization of the film.
The Wicker Man	Robin Hardy, Anthony Shaffer	0307382761	Crown Publishing Group	1978	Novelization of the film.
1941	Bob Gale	0-345-28332-5 / 978-0-345-28332-0	Ballantine Books	1979	Novelization of the film.
American Gigolo	Timothy Harris	0385280254 / 978-0385280259	Dell Publishing	1979	Novelization of the film; published a year before the release of the source film.
The Apple Dumpling Gang Rides Again	Gary Poole	0-44102-585-4/978-0-44102-585-5	Ace Books	June 1979	Novelization of the film.
The Black Hole	Alan Dean Foster	0-345-29053-4/978-0-345-29053-3	Del Rey Books	December 1979	Novelization of the film.
The Complete American Graffiti: The Novel	John Minahan	0425045544 / 978-0425045541	Berkley Books	1979	Novelization of the films American Graffiti and More American Graffiti.
Meteor	Edmund H. North, Franklin Coen	0-446-82848-3	Warner Books	October 1979	Novelization of the film.
Prophecy	David Seltzer	0345286421 / 978-0345286420	Ballantine Books	1979	Novelization of the film.
The Spaceman and King Arthur	Heather Simon	0-45004-567-6 / 978-0-45004-567-7	New English Library	August 1979	British novelization of the film Unidentified Flying Oddball, under the alternative title.
The Fog	Dennis Etchison	0553138251 / 978-0553138252	Bantam Books	1980	Novelization of the film.
The Awakening	Ronald Chetwynd-Hayes			1980	Novelization of the film, which in turn was based on Bram Stoker's novel The Jewel of Seven Stars
Dead & Buried	Chelsea Quinn Yarbro			1980	
The Funhouse	Dean Koontz	0-425-14248-5	Jove Books	1980	Novelization of the film, released a year before its source material.
Heavy Metal	L.F. Blake	0417063504 / 9780417063508	Magnum Littlehampton Book Services	1980	Novelization of the film.
Riding High					Novelization of the film.
The Last Flight of Noah's Ark (US)	Chas Carner	0345291735 / 978-0345291738	Ballantine Books	1980	American novelization of the film.
The Last Flight of Noah's Ark (UK)	Heather Simon	0450050068 / 978-0450050060	New English Library	1980	British novelization of the film.
Midnight Madness	Tom Wright	0441529852 / 978-0441529858	Ace Books	1980	Novelization of the film.
Saturn 3	Steve Gallagher	0722137621 / 978-0722137628	Sphere Books	1980	Novelization of the film.
Snowball Express	Joe Claro	0590303597 / 978-0590303590	Scholastic Book Services	1980	Novelization of the film, released eight years after its source.
Teddy	John Gault	0770415989	Bantam Books	1980	Novelization of the film The Pit, released a year before its source.
Butcher, Baker, Nightmare Maker	Joseph Burgo, Richard Natale	0671429353	Pocket Books	1981	Novelization of the film.
Clash of the Titans	Alan Dean Foster	0446936758 / 978-0446936750	Warner Books	1981	Novelization of the film.
Condorman (US)	Joe Claro	059032022X / 978-0590320221 (original); 0590721577 / 978-0590721578 (reprint)	Scholastic Book Services	1981	American novelization of the film.
Condorman (UK)	Heather Simon	0450052605 / 978-0450052606	New English Library	1981	British novelization of the film.
The Devil and Max Devlin	Robert Grossbach	0345293649 / 978-0345293640	Ballantine Books	1981	Novelization of the film.
Dragonslayer	Wayland Drew	034529694X / 978-0345296948	Ballantine Books	1981	Novelization of the film.
Final Exam	Geoffrey Meyer	0523415850	Pinnacle Books	1981	Novelization of the film.
The Fox and the Hound	Heather Simon	0671442910 / 978-0671442910	Archway Paperbacks	December 1981	First novelization of the film.
Gallipoli	Jack Bennett	0-312-31572-4	St. Martins Press	1981	Novelization of the film.
Hawk the Slayer	Terry Marcel; Harry Robertson	0450050467 / 978-0450050466	New English Library	1981	Novelization of the film.
The Wave	Todd Strasser	0-440-99371-7	Dell Publishing	1981	Novelization of the film.
Zorro, The Gay Blade	Les Dean	0-8439-1007-0	Leisure Books	1981	Novelization of the film.
The Dark Crystal	A.C.H. Smith	0708822312 / 9780708822319	Futura Books	1982	Novelization of the film.
Poltergeist	James Kahn	0446302228	Grand Central Pub	1982	Novelization of the film.
Local Hero	David Benedictus	0140066608 0727809547	Penguin Severn House	1983	Novelization of the screenplay
Buckaroo Banzai	Earl Mac Rauch	0375841547	Pocket Books	1984	Novelization of the film.
Splash	Ian Don	0352315946 / 978-0352315946	Star Books	1984	Novelization of the film.
Baby	Ian Don	0-352-31693-4 / 978-0-352-31693-6	Star Books	1985	Novelization of the film.
Escape from New York	Mike McQuay	0553149148	Bantam Books	1985	Novelization of the film.
Fright Night	John Skipp, Craig Spector	979-8683973254	Goldmann	1985	Novelization of the film.
The Journey of Natty Gann	Ann Matthews	0671606492 / 978-0671606497	Archway Paperbacks	1985	Novelization of the film.
One Magic Christmas	Martin Noble	0426202422 / 978-0426202424	W. H. Allen & Co.	1985	Novelization of the film.
My Science Project	Mike McQuay	0553253786 / 978-0553253788	Bantam Books	1985	Novelization of the film.
Return of the Living Dead	John A. Russo	0099426102 / 9780099426103	Arrow Books	1985	Novelization of the film.
The Terminator	Randall Frakes, William Wisher Jr.	0553253174	Spectra Books	1985	Novelization of the film.
Young Sherlock Holmes	Alan Arnold	0583309429 / 978-0583309424	Grafton	1985	Novelization of the film.
The Aristocats	Victoria Crenson	0816708878	Ottenheimer Publishers	1986	Junior novelization of the film.
Down and Out in Beverly Hills	Ian Marter	0352318635 / 978-0352318633	Star Books	1986	Novelization of the film.
Lady and the Tramp	Victoria Crenson	0816708886	Ottenheimer Publishers	1986	Junior novelization of the film.
RoboCop	Ed Naha	0440174791	Dell Publishing	1986	Novelization of the 1987 film.
Ruthless People	Martin Noble	0352320265 / 978-0352320261	Star Books	1986	Novelization of the film.
Short Circuit	Colin Wedgelock	0722170351 / 978-0722170359	Sphere Books	1986	Novelization of the film.
Song of the South	Victoria Crenson	0816708886	Ottenheimer Publishers	1986	Junior novelization of the film.
Adventures in Babysitting	Elizabeth Faucher	0-590-41251-5 / 978-0-590-41251-3	Point	1987	Novelization of the film.
Harry and the Hendersons	Joyce Thompson	042510155X / 978-0425101551	Berkley Books	1987	Novelization of the film
Lethal Weapon	Kirk Mitchell	0553174959	Bantam Books	1987	Novelization of the film.
The Lost Boys	Craig Shaw Gardner	0425100448	Berkley Books	1987	Novelization of the film.
Outrageous Fortune	Robin Turner	035232080X / 978-0352320803	Star Books	1987	Novelization of the film.
Re-Animator	Jeff Rovin	0671637231	Pocket Books	1987	Novelization of the film.
Tin Men	Martin Noble	0352320818 / 978-0352320810	Star Books	1987	Novelization of the film.
Tucker: The Man and His Dream	Robert Tine	0671665863 / 978-0671665869	Pocket Books	1988	Novelization of the film.
Who Framed Roger Rabbit	Martin Noble	0352323892 / 978-0352323897	Star Books	1988	Novelization of the film.
Who Framed Roger Rabbit	Justine Korman	0140341889	Puffin Books	1988	Junior novelization of the film.
Willow	Wayland Drew	0345351959 / 978-0345351951	Ballantine Books	1988	Novelization of the film.
The Abyss	Orson Scott Card	0099690608 / 978-0099690603	Pocket Books	1989	Novelization of the film.
Black Rain	Mike Cogan	067168969X / 978-0671689698	Pocket Books	1989	Novelization of the film.
Dead Poets Society	Nancy H. Kleinbaum	9781401308773	Hyperion Books	1989	Novelization of the film.
Honey, I Shrunk the Kids	Elizabeth Faucher	0140902120 / 978-0140902129	Fantail	1989	Novelization of the film.
Honey, I Shrunk the Kids	Bonnie Bryant Hiller and Neil W. Hiller	0590421190 / 978-0590421195	Scholastic, Inc.	1989	Junior novelization of the film.
Total Recall	Piers Anthony	0688052096	Arrow Books	1989	Novelization of the 1990 film.
Darkman	Randall Boyll	0515103780	Jove	1990	Novelization of the film.
Hudson Hawk	Geoffrey Marsh	0515107387 / 978-0515107388	Jove Books	1991	Novelization of the film.
Bram Stoker's Dracula	Fred Saberhagen, James V. Hart	0451175751	Signet Books	1992	Novelization of the film.
Far and Away	Sonja Massie	0-425-13298-6	Berkley Books	1992	Novelization of the film.
Fortress	Rob Gerrand	1863950001 / 978-1863950008	Bookman Publishing	1992	Novelization of the film.
Demolition Man	Robert Tine	0451180798	E. P. Dutton	1993	Novelization of the film.
12 Monkeys	Elizabeth Hand	0061056588	HarperPrism	1995	Novelization of the film.
Lord of Illusions	Clive Barker	0751516511	Little, Brown and Company	1995	Novelization of the film.
Waterworld	Max Allen Collins	0099638312 / 978-0099638315	Arrow Books	1995	Novelization of the film.
Dragonheart	Charles Edward Pogue	1572971304	Berkley Books	1996	Novelization of the film.
The Ghost and the Darkness	Dewey Gram	0671003054 / 9780671003050	Pocket Books	1996	Novelization of the film.
Space Jam	Francine Hughes	0590945556 / 978-0590945554	Scholastic Corporation	1996	Novelization of the film.
Mars Attacks!	Jonathan Gems	0451192567 / 978-0451192561	Signet Books	1996	Novelization of the film.
Good Burger	Joseph Locke	978-0671016920	Pocket Books	1997	Novelization of the film.
Men in Black	Steve Perry	0553577565	Bantam Books	1997	Novelization of the film.
Dark City	Frank Lauria	0312963432	St. Martin's Press	1998	Novelization of the film.
Mulan	Cathy East Dubowski	0786842229	Disney Press	1998	Junior novelization of the film.
The Iron Giant	James Preller	0439086345	Scholastic Corporation	1999	Junior novelization of the film.
The Road to El Dorado	Peter Lerangis	0141310049 / 978-0141310046	Puffin Books	2000	Novelization of the film.
Pirates of the Caribbean: The Curse of the Black Pearl	Irene Trimble	0736421718	Disney Press	2003	Junior novelization of the film.
The Punisher	D.A. Stern	0345475569	Del Rey Books	2004	Novelization of the film.
Van Helsing	Kevin Ryan	0743493540	HarperCollins	2004	Novelization of the film.
Snakes on a Plane	Christa Faust	1844163814	Games Workshop	2006	Novelization of the film.
The Toxic Avenger: The Novel	Lloyd Kaufman, Adam Jahnke	1560258705	Running Press	2006	Novelization of the film.
V for Vendetta	Steve Moore	1416516999	Pocket Star Books	2006	Novelization of the film.
30 Days of Night	Tim Lebbon	1416544976	Pocket Star Books	2007	Novelization of the film.
Jennifer's Body	Audrey Nixon	006180892X	HarperFestival	2009	Novelization of the film.
ParaNorman	Elizabeth Cody Kimmel	0316231851	Little, Brown Books for Young Readers	2012	Novelization of the film.
Pacific Rim	Alex Irvine	9781781166789	Titan Books	2013	Novelization of the film.
Manos: The Hands of Fate	Stephen D. Sullivan	1519301340	Walkabout Publishing	2015	Novelization of the film.
Kubo and the Two Strings	Sadie Chesterfield	0316361445	Little, Brown and Company	2016	Novelization of the film.
Plan 9 from Outer Space	Matthew Ewald	1523689307	Darkstone Productions, LLC	2016	Novelization of the film.
Zootopia	Suzanne Francis	0736433945	Disney Press	2016	Junior novelization of the film.
Mean Girls	Micol Ostow	133828195X	Scholastic Corporation	2017	Novelization of the film.>
The House on Haunted Hill	Tommy Jamerson	9781940865256	Next Stage Press	2019	Novelization of the film.
Pan's Labyrinth: The Labyrinth of the Faun	Guillermo del Toro, Cornelia Funke	0062414461	Katherine Tegen	2019	Novelization of the film.
Nightmare Pavilion	Andy Rausch	1-951036-21-2	Happy Cloud Publishing	2020	Novelization of the film Carnival of Souls.
Freshwater	Julian Michael Carver	1922551945	Severed Press	2021	Novelization of the film.
Once Upon a Time in Hollywood	Quentin Tarantino	0063112523/9780063112520	Harper Perennial	2021	Novelization of the film.

=== Novels based on plays ===
- The Scarlet Pimpernel (1908), Baroness Orczy
- Bought and Paid For (1912), Arthur Hornblow
- Peg o' My Heart (1913), J. Hartley Manners
- Peter and Wendy (1911), J. M. Barrie
- The Bat (1926), Stephen Vincent Benét
- The Girl of the Golden West (1911), David Belasco
- The Lion and the Mouse (1906), Arthur Hornblow
- The Master Mind (1913), Marvin Dana
- The Passing of the Third Floor Back (1935), Claude Houghton
- The Return of Peter Grimm (1912), David Belasco

=== Novels based on television programs ===
==== Standalone novels ====
Title	Author	Publisher	ISBN	Publication date	Notes
Flight into Danger (1958)	John Castle and Arthur Hailey	Souvenir Press	[none]	1958	Novelization of the CBC play of the same title; later adapted as the television film Terror in the Sky (1971).
Boy Dominic (1974)	Geoffrey Morgan	Armada Books	ISBN 0-006-90904-3	1974	Based on the Yorkshire series of the same title.
The View from Daniel Pike (1974)	Edward Boyd and Bill Knox				
Intimate Strangers (1974)	Alan Wykes	New English Library	ISBN 0-450-02314-1	September 1974	Novelization of the LWT series of the same title.
The Organization (1974)	Philip Mackie				
Arthur of the Britons (1975)	Rex Edwards	Target Books	ISBN 0-426-10540-0	1975	Original novel on the Harlech series of the same title.
Victorian Scandals (1976)	Peter Wildeblood	Arrow Books	ISBN 0-099-13940-5	1976	Original novel on the Granada series of the same title.
Danger UXB (1979)	Michael Beaker	Pan Books and Macmillian London	ISBN 0-330-25671-8	1979	Original novel based on the Thames series of the same title.
Quest of Eagles (1979)	Richard Cooper				
The Omega Factor (1979)	Jack Gerson				
The Ravelled Thread (1979)	John Lucarotti	Puffin Books			
The Further Adventures of Oliver Twist (1980)	David Butler	Futura Publications	ISBN 0-7088-1724-6	1980	Novelization of the ATV serial of the same title.
Automan (1984)	Martin Noble	Target Books	ISBN 0-426-19975-8	1984	Novelization of the pilot episode of the series of the same title.
By the Sword Divided (1983)	Mollie Hardwick				
The Bounder (1983)	Eric Chappell				
The Outsider (1983)	Hugh Miller				
Morgan's Boy (1984)	Alick Rowe	Sphere Books	ISBN 0-426-10540-0	1984	Novelization of the BBC One series of the same title.
Mitch (1984)	Roger Mark	New English Library	ISBN 0-450-05516-7	1984	Novelization of the LWT series of the same title.
Charlie (1984)	Nigel Williams				
Lytton's Diary (1985)	Ray Connolly				
Connie (1985)	Ron Hutchinson				
The Collectors (1986)	Evan Christie				Novelization of the BBC One series of the same title.

==== Novels by series ====
Series	Title	Author(s)	ISBN	Publisher	Notes
Battlestar Galactica (1978)	Battlestar Galactica (1978)	Glen A. Larson and Robert Thurston			Novelization of the pilot episode "Saga of a Star World".
Battlestar Galactica (1978)	Battlestar Galactica 2: The Cylon Death Machine (1979)	Glen A. Larson and Robert Thurston			Novelization
Battlestar Galactica (1978)	Battlestar Galactica 3: The Tombs of Kobol (1979)	Glen A. Larson and Robert Thurston			Novelization
Battlestar Galactica (1978)	Battlestar Galactica 4: The Young Warriors (1979)	Glen A. Larson and Robert Thurston			Novelization
Battlestar Galactica (1978)	Battlestar Galactica 5: Galactica Discovers Earth (1980)	Glen A. Larson and Michael Resnick			Novelization of the episode of the same title from Galactica 1980.
Battlestar Galactica (1978)	Battlestar Galactica 6: The Living Legend (1980)	Glen A. Larson and Nicholas Yermakov			Novelization
Battlestar Galactica (1978)	Battlestar Galactica 7: War of the Gods (1980)	Glen A. Larson and Nicholas Yermakov			Novelization
Battlestar Galactica (1978)	Battlestar Galactica 8: Greetings from Earth (1980)	Glen A. Larson and Ron Goulart			Novelization
Battlestar Galactica (1978)	Battlestar Galactica 9: Experiment in Terra (1980)	Glen A. Larson and Ron Goulart			Novelization
Battlestar Galactica (1978)	Battlestar Galactica 10: The Long Patrol (1980)	Glen A. Larson and Ron Goulart			Novelization
Battlestar Galactica (1978)	Battlestar Galactica 11: The Nightmare Machine (1980)	Glen A. Larson and Robert Thurston			Original novel
Battlestar Galactica (1978)	Battlestar Galactica 12: "Die, Chameleon!" (1980)	Glen A. Larson and Robert Thurston			Original novel
Battlestar Galactica (1978)	Battlestar Galactica 13: Apollo's War (1980)	Glen A. Larson and Robert Thurston			Original novel
Battlestar Galactica (1978)	Battlestar Galactica 14: Surrender the Galactica! (1980)	Glen A. Larson and Robert Thurston			Original novel
Ben Casey	Ben Casey (1962)	William Johnston		Lancer Books	
Ben Casey	Ben Casey: A Rage for Justice (1962)	Norman Daniels		Lancer Books	
Ben Casey	Ben Casey: The Strength of His Hands (1963)	Sam Elkin		Lancer Books	
Ben Casey	Ben Casey: The Fire Within (1963)	Norman Daniels		Lancer Books	
Buck Rogers in the 25th Century	Buck Rogers in the 25th Century (1978)	Addison E. Steele			Novelization of the pilot film.
Buck Rogers in the 25th Century	Buck Rogers: That Man on Beta (1979)	Addison E. Steele			Novelization of an unproduced teleplay from the series.

=== Novels based on video games ===
- List of novels based on video games

== See also ==
- Dramatization
- Tie-in
- Ballantine Books
- Dell Publishing
- Target Books
- Tor Books
- Alan Dean Foster
- List of Alien (franchise) novels
- List of Alien vs. Predator novels
- List of Disney novelizations
- List of Doctor Who novelizations
- List of Nickelodeon novelizations
- List of Predator (franchise) novels
- List of Star Trek novels
- List of Star Wars books
- List of television series made into books
- The X-Files literature
