= Third power (disambiguation) =

A third power is the cube of a number.

Third Power may also refer to:

- Third Power (band), an American psychedelic hard rock band
- The Third Power, a 1991 album by Material
- Jason X: To the Third Power, a 2006 novel by Nancy Kilpatrick
- Third Power (album), a 2011 album by DJ Drama
