= Jason Voorhees =

Antagonist of the Friday the 13th franchise

- Friday the 13th character
- Ken Kirzinger as Jason Voorhees in Freddy vs. Jason (2003)
- First appearance: Friday the 13th (1980)
- Created by: Victor Miller
- Portrayed by: Adult: Steve Daskewisz; Richard Brooker; Ted White; Tom Morga; C. J. Graham; Kane Hodder; Ken Kirzinger; Derek Mears; Schuyler White; Jonathan Tison; Young: Ari Lehman; Timothy Burr Mirkovich; Spencer Stump; Caleb Guss; Callum Vinson; Kaiden Cullen; Theo Lonsdale

In-universe information
- Full name: Jason Voorhees; Jason Wittering (Crystal Lake)
- Classification: Mass murderer
- Signature weapon: Machete
- Location: Camp Crystal Lake, New Jersey

Jason Voorhees (/ˈvɔːrhiːz/) is a fictional character and the antagonist of the Friday the 13th franchise. He first appeared in Friday the 13th (1980) as the young son of camp-cook-turned-killer Pamela Voorhees, in which he was portrayed by Ari Lehman. Created by Victor Miller, with contributions by Ron Kurz, Sean S. Cunningham and Tom Savini, Jason was not originally intended to carry the series as the main antagonist. The character has subsequently been represented in various other media, including novels, video games, and comic books.

The character has primarily been an antagonist in the films, whether by stalking and killing the other characters, or acting as a psychological threat to the protagonist, as in the case of Friday the 13th: A New Beginning. Since Lehman's portrayal, the character has been represented by numerous actors and stuntmen, sometimes by more than one at a time; this has caused some controversy as to who should receive credit for the portrayal. Kane Hodder is the best known of the stuntmen to portray Jason, having played the character in four consecutive films.

The character's physical appearance has gone through many transformations, with various special makeup effects artists making their mark on the character's design. Tom Savini's initial design has been the basis for many of the later incarnations. The trademark hockey mask did not appear until Friday the 13th Part III. Since Friday the 13th Part VI: Jason Lives, filmmakers have given Jason superhuman strength, regenerative powers, and near invulnerability. Some interpretations suggest that the audience has empathy for Jason, whose motivation for killing has been cited as being driven by the immoral actions of his victims and his own rage over having drowned as a child. Jason has been featured in various humor magazines, referenced in feature films, parodied in television series, and was the inspiration for a horror punk band. Several toy lines have been released based on various versions of the character from the Friday the 13th films. Jason's hockey mask is a widely recognized image in popular culture.

== Appearances ==
Jason Voorhees first appears during a nightmare of the main character Alice Hardy (Adrienne King) in the original Friday the 13th film; he becomes the main antagonist of the series in its sequels. As well as the films and the television series Crystal Lake, there have been books and comics that have either expanded the universe of Jason, or been based on a minor aspect of him.

=== Films ===
Jason, as he appears in Friday the 13th Part 2

Jason made his first cinematic appearance in the original Friday the 13th on May 9, 1980. In this film, Jason (Ari Lehman) is portrayed in the memories of his mother, Pamela Voorhees (Betsy Palmer), and as a nightmare of the film's protagonist, Alice (Adrienne King). Although not a central character in the original movie, he is still the catalyst of the film's plot—Pamela Voorhees, the main antagonist, seeks revenge for her son's drowning, which she blames on the irresponsible camp counselors. Jason's second appearance was in the sequel, Friday the 13th Part 2 (1981). Retconned as never having died, an adult Jason exacts revenge on Alice for decapitating his mother in the original film. Jason (Steven Dash and Warrington Gillette) returns to Crystal Lake, living there as a hermit and guarding it from all intruders. Five years later a group of teenagers arrive to set up a new camp, only to be murdered one by one by Jason, who wears a sack over his head to hide his face. Ginny (Amy Steel), the lone survivor, finds a makeshift shack in the woods with a shrine built around the severed head of Mrs. Voorhees, and surrounded by corpses. Ginny fights back and slams a machete through Jason's shoulder. He is left incapacitated as Ginny is taken away in an ambulance. In Friday the 13th Part III (1982), Jason (Richard Brooker) escapes to a nearby lake resort, Higgins Haven, to rest from his wounds. At the same time, Chris Higgins (Dana Kimmell) returns to family property with some acquaintances. An unmasked and reclusive Jason kills anyone who wanders into the barn where he is hiding. Taking a hockey mask from a victim to hide his face, he leaves the barn to kill the rest of the group. Chris fends off Jason by slamming an axe into his head, but the night's events drive her into hysteria as the police take her away.

Friday the 13th: The Final Chapter (1984) continues the story, with a presumed-dead Jason (Ted White) found by the police and taken to the morgue. Jason awakens at the morgue and kills the coroner and a nurse, and makes his way back to Crystal Lake. A group of teens renting a house there fall victim to Jason's rampage. Jason then seeks out Trish (Kimberly Beck) and Tommy Jarvis (Corey Feldman) next door. While Trish distracts Jason, Tommy finally kills him with a machete. Friday the 13th: A New Beginning (1985) follows Tommy Jarvis (John Shepherd), who was committed to a mental hospital after the events of The Final Chapter, and has grown up constantly afraid that Jason (Tom Morga) will return. Jason's body was supposedly cremated after Tommy killed him. Roy Burns (Dick Wieand) uses Jason's persona to become a copycat killer at the halfway home to which Tommy was moved. Jason appears in the film only through Tommy's dreams and hallucinations. In Friday the 13th Part VI: Jason Lives (1986), Tommy (Thom Mathews), who has run away from a mental institution, visits Jason's grave and learns that Jason's body was never actually cremated, but buried in a cemetery near Crystal Lake. While attempting to destroy his body, Tommy inadvertently resurrects Jason (C. J. Graham) via a piece of cemetery fence that acts as a lightning rod. Now possessing superhuman abilities, Jason returns to Crystal Lake, renamed Forest Green, and begins his killing spree anew. Tommy eventually lures Jason back to the lake where he drowned as a child and chains him to a boulder on the lake floor, but almost dies in the process. Tommy's friend, Megan Garris (Jennifer Cooke), finishes Jason off by cutting his neck with a boat propeller.

Friday the 13th Part VII: The New Blood (1988) begins an undisclosed amount of time after Jason Lives. Jason (Kane Hodder) is inadvertently freed from his chains by the telekinetic Tina Shepard (Lar Park Lincoln), who was attempting to resurrect her father. Jason begins killing those who occupy Crystal Lake, and after a battle with Tina, is dragged back to the bottom of the lake by an apparition of Tina's father. Friday the 13th Part VIII: Jason Takes Manhattan (1989) sees Jason return from the grave, brought back to life via an underwater electrical cable. He follows a group of students on their senior class trip to Manhattan, boarding the Lazarus to wreak havoc. Upon reaching Manhattan, Jason kills all the survivors but Rennie (Jensen Daggett) and Sean (Scott Reeves); he chases them into the sewers, where he is submerged in toxic waste and dies. In Jason Goes to Hell: The Final Friday (1993), through an unexplained resurrection, he returns to Crystal Lake where he is hunted by the FBI. The FBI sets up a sting to kill Jason, which proves successful. However, through mystical possession, Jason survives by passing his demon-infested heart from one being to the next. Though Jason does not physically appear throughout most of the film, it is learned he has a half-sister and a niece, and that he needs them to retrieve and reinhabit his body. After resurrecting it, Jason is stabbed by his niece Jessica Kimble (Kari Keegan) and dragged into Hell.

Jason X (2001) marked Kane Hodder's last performance as Jason. The film starts off in 2010; Jason has returned after another unexplained resurrection. Captured by the U.S. government in 2008, Jason is being experimented upon in a research facility, where it has been determined that he has regenerative capabilities and that cryonic suspension is the only possible solution to stop him, since numerous attempts to execute him have proved unsuccessful. Jason escapes, killing all but one of his captors, and slices through the cryo-chamber, spilling cryonics fluid into the room, freezing himself and the only other survivor, Rowan (Lexa Doig). A team of students 445 years later discover Jason's body. On the team's spacecraft, Jason thaws from his cryonic suspension and begins killing the crew. Along the way, he is enhanced by a regenerative nanotechnology process, which gives him an impenetrable metal body. Finally, he is ejected into space and falls to the planet Earth II, incinerated in the atmosphere.

Freddy vs. Jason (2003) is a crossover film in which Jason battles A Nightmare on Elm Street's villain Freddy Krueger (Robert Englund), a supernatural killer who murders people in their dreams. Krueger has grown weak, as people in his home town of Springwood have suppressed their fear of him. Freddy, who is impersonating Jason's mother (Paula Shaw), resurrects Jason (Ken Kirzinger) from Hell and sends him to Springwood to cause panic and fear. Jason accomplishes this, but refuses to stop killing. A battle ensues in both the dream world and Crystal Lake. The identity of the winner is left ambiguous, as Jason surfaces from the lake holding Freddy's severed head, which winks and laughs.

In the 2009 Friday the 13th reboot, young Jason (Caleb Guss) witnesses his mother's (Nana Visitor) beheading as a child and follows in her footsteps, killing anyone who comes to Crystal Lake. The adult Jason (Derek Mears) kidnaps Whitney Miller (Amanda Righetti), a girl who looks like his mother, and holds her prisoner in his tunnels. One month later, Whitney's brother Clay (Jared Padalecki) comes to Crystal Lake and rescues her. Eventually, Whitney uses Jason's devotion to his mother against him, stabbing him with his own machete while he is distracted when she appears. When his body is dumped into the lake, Jason emerges from the water to grab Whitney and their fates are left unknown.

=== Literature ===
Jason first appeared outside film in the 1982 novelization of Friday the 13th Part 3 by Michael Avallone. Avallone chose to use an alternate ending, which was filmed for Part 3 but never used, as the ending for his 1982 adaptation. In the alternate film ending, Chris, who is in the canoe, hears Rick's voice and immediately rushes back to the house. When she opens the door, Jason is standing there with a machete, and he decapitates her. Jason next appears in print in the 1986 novelization of Jason Lives by Simon Hawke, who also adapted the first three films in 1987 and 1988. Jason Lives specifically introduced Jason's father, a character who was slated to appear in the film but was cut by the studio. In the novel, instead of being cremated, Jason’s father had him buried after his death.

Jason made his comic book debut in the 1993 adaptation of Jason Goes to Hell, written by Andy Mangels. The three-issue series was a condensed version of the film, with a few added scenes that were never shot. Jason made his first appearance outside the direct adaptations in Satan's Six No. 4, published in 1993, which is a continuation of the events of Jason Goes to Hell. In 1995, Nancy A. Collins wrote a three-issue, non-canonical miniseries involving a crossover between Jason and Leatherface. The story involves Jason stowing away aboard a train, after being released from Crystal Lake when the area is drained due to heavy toxic-waste dumping. Jason meets Leatherface, who adopts him into his family after the two become friends. Eventually they turn on each other. In 1994, four young adult novels were released under the title of Friday the 13th. They did not feature Jason explicitly, but revolve around people becoming possessed by Jason when they put on his mask.

In 2003 and 2005, Black Flame published novelizations of Freddy vs. Jason and Jason X respectively. In 2005, they began publishing a new series of novels; one set was published under the Jason X title, while the second set used the Friday the 13th title. The Jason X series consisted of four sequels to the novelization of the film. Jason X: The Experiment was the first published. In this novel, Jason is being used by the government, who are trying to use his indestructibility to create their own army of "super-soldiers". Planet of the Beast follows the efforts of Dr. Bardox and his crew as they try to clone the body of a comatose Jason, and shows their efforts to stay alive when Jason wakes from his coma. Death Moon revolves around Jason crash-landing at Moon Camp Americana. Jason is discovered below a prison site and unknowingly awakened in To the Third Power. Jason has a son in this book, conceived through a form of artificial insemination.

On May 13, 2005, Avatar Press began releasing new Friday the 13th comics. The first, titled Friday the 13th, was written by Brian Pulido and illustrated by Mike Wolfer and Greg Waller. The story takes place after the events of Freddy vs. Jason, where siblings Miles and Laura Upland have inherited Camp Crystal Lake. Knowing that Jason caused the recent destruction, Laura, unknown to her brother, sets out to kill Jason using a paramilitary group, so that she and her brother can sell the property. A three-issue miniseries titled Friday the 13th: Bloodbath was released in September 2005. Written by Brian Pulido and illustrated by Mike Wolfer and Andrew Dalhouse, the story involves a group of teenagers who come from Camp Tomorrow, a camp that sits on Crystal Lake, for work and a "party-filled weekend". The teenagers discover they share common family backgrounds, and soon awaken Jason, who hunts them. Brian Pulido returned for a third time in October 2005 to write Jason X. Picking up after the events of the Jason X film, Über-Jason is now on Earth II where a biological engineer, Kristen, attempts to subdue Jason, in hopes that she can use his regenerative tissue to save her own life and the lives of those she loves. In February 2006, Avatar published Friday the 13th: Jason vs. Jason X. Written and illustrated by Mike Wolfer, the story takes place after the events of the film Jason X. A salvage team discovers the spaceship Grendel and awakens a regenerated Jason Voorhees. The "original" Jason and Über-Jason are drawn to each other, resulting in a battle to the death. In June 2006, a one-shot comic entitled Friday the 13th: Fearbook was released, written by Mike Wolfer with art by Sebastian Fiumara. The comic has Jason being captured and experimented upon by the Trent Organization; Jason escapes and seeks out Violet, the survivor of Friday the 13th: Bloodbath, who is being contained by the Trent Organization in their Crystal Lake headquarters.

The Friday the 13th novella storyline was not connected to the Jason X series, and did not continue the stories set forth by the films, but furthered the character of Jason in its own way. Friday the 13th: Church of the Divine Psychopath has Jason resurrected by a religious cult. Jason is stuck in Hell, when recently executed serial killer Wayne Sanchez persuades Jason to help him return to Earth in Friday the 13th: Hell Lake. In Hate-Kill-Repeat, two religious serial killers attempt to find Jason at Crystal Lake, believing that the three of them share the same contempt for those that break the moral code. In The Jason Strain, Jason is on an island with a group of convicts placed there by television executives running a reality game show. The character of Pamela Voorhees returns from the grave in Carnival of Maniacs. Pamela is in search of Jason, who is now part of a traveling sideshow and about to be auctioned off to the highest bidder.

In December 2006, DC Comics imprint Wildstorm began publishing new comic books about Jason Voorhees under the Friday the 13th moniker. The first set was a six-issue miniseries involving Jason's return to Camp Crystal Lake, which is being renovated by a group of teenagers in preparation for its reopening as a tourist attraction. The series depicts various paranormal phenomena occurring at Crystal Lake. Jason's actions in this storyline are driven by the vengeful spirits of a Native American tribe wiped out on the lake by fur traders sometime in the 19th century. On July 11 and August 15, 2007, Wildstorm published a two-part special entitled Friday the 13th: Pamela's Tale. The two-issue comic book covers Pamela Voorhees' journey to Camp Crystal Lake and the story of her pregnancy with Jason as she recounts it to hitchhiker Annie, a camp counselor who was killed in the original film. Wildstorm released another two-part special, entitled Friday the 13th: How I Spent My Summer Vacation, that was released on September 12 and October 10, 2007. The comic book provides new insight into the psychology of Jason Voorhees as he befriends a boy born with a skull deformity. Wildstorm released a six-issue series called Freddy vs. Jason vs. Ash, starring the two killers and Ash from the Evil Dead series. In this story, Freddy uses the Necronomicon, which is in the Voorhees' basement, to escape from Jason's subconscious and "gain powers unlike anything he's had before". Freddy attempts to use Jason to retrieve the book, stating it will make him a real boy. Ash, who is working at the local S-Mart in Crystal Lake, learns of the book's existence and sets out to destroy it. Wildstorm released another two-issue miniseries on January 9 and February 13, 2008, titled Friday the 13th: Bad Land, written and illustrated by Ron Marz and Mike Huddleston respectively. The miniseries features Jason stalking a trio of teenaged hikers taking shelter from a blizzard in Camp Crystal Lake.

A sequel to Freddy vs. Jason vs. Ash, subtitled The Nightmare Warriors, was released by Wildstorm in 2009. Jason escapes from the bottom of Crystal Lake to resume his hunt for Ash, but is captured by the U.S. government. Freddy helps him escape and appoints him the general of his Deadite army, using the Necronomicon to heal his accumulated injuries and decomposition; it removes his natural deformities in the process. At the climax of the story, Jason battles his nemesis Tommy Jarvis and his great-niece Stephanie Kimble; Stephanie impales him before Tommy decapitates him with a shard of glass. Jason's soul is then absorbed by Freddy, who uses it to increase his own power.

=== Video games ===
Jason has appeared in multiple video games based on the Friday the 13th franchise. He made his first video game appearance in Friday the 13th, a 1986 game for the Amstrad CPC, ZX Spectrum, and Commodore 64. His next appearance was in 1989, when LJN, an American game company known for its games based on popular movies in the 1980s and early 1990s, released Friday the 13th on the Nintendo Entertainment System. The premise involved the gamer, who picks one of six camp counselors as their player, trying to save the campers from Jason, while battling various enemies throughout the game. On October 13, 2006, Friday the 13th: Road to Hell was released for mobile phones. The game puts the user in the persona of Jason as he battles the undead. Another Friday the 13th video game was released in 2017, which allows players to take control of Jason or camp counselors in a multiplayer format focused on Jason attempting to kill the counselors before they can escape or if time runs out. Jason then appeared in Friday the 13th: Killer Puzzle the following year. The player controls Jason by sliding him around an isometric puzzle to attack victims directly or indirectly, in "Kill Scenes".

Jason has also appeared in several crossover games. He appears as a playable character in the Mortal Kombat franchise with the 2015 fighting games Mortal Kombat X and Mortal Kombat Mobile as a downloadable content bonus character. Jason is also playable in the fighting game MultiVersus. Jason had made appearances as a playable character in the Call of Duty franchise with Call of Duty: Warzone and Call of Duty: Black Ops 6 in an event called "The Haunting" starting on October 9, 2025. Jason appears as a purchasable skin in Fortnite during 2025's edition of their Fortnitemares event. He joined the game on October 10, and became purchasable on October 18. Jason became a downloadable playable character in the online asymmetrical survival horror game Dead by Daylight starting on June 16, 2026.

== Concept and creation ==
Tom Savini applies make-up to Ari Lehman, creating his vision of Jason Voorhees.

Initially created by Victor Miller, Jason's final design was a combined effort by Miller, Ron Kurz, and Tom Savini. The name "Jason" is a combination of "Josh" and "Ian", Miller's two sons, and "Voorhees" was inspired by a girl that Miller knew at high school whose last name was Voorhees. Miller felt it was a "creepy-sounding name", which was perfect for his character. Miller initially wrote Jason as a normal-looking child, but the crew behind the film decided he needed to be deformed. Victor Miller explained Jason was not meant to be a creature from the "Black Lagoon" in his script, and scripted Jason as a mentally disabled young boy; it was Savini who made Jason deformed. Ron Kurz confirmed that Miller's version of Jason was that of a normal child, but claims that it was his idea to turn Jason into a "mongoloid creature", and have him "jump out of the lake at the end of the film". Miller later agreed the ending would not have been as good if he looked like "Betsy Palmer at eight years old". Miller wrote a scene where Alice dreams she is attacked in a canoe by Jason, and then she wakes up in a hospital bed. Miller's intention was to get as close to Carrie's ending as possible. Savini believed having Jason pop out of the lake would be psychologically disturbing to the audience, and since Alice is supposed to be dreaming, the crew could get away with adding anything they wanted.

When it came time to cast the role of Jason, Ari Lehman, who had received a part in Sean Cunningham's Manny's Orphans, arrived to read for the character of Jack. Before he could get started, Cunningham walked in and offered him a different part: Jason. Without having read a single word, Cunningham just looked at Ari and said, "You're the right size, you've got it." In the original Friday the 13th, Ari Lehman is seen only in a brief flashback as the surprise ending. Subsequent actors who portrayed a young Jason include Timothy Burr Mirkovich in Jason Takes Manhattan and Spencer Stump in Freddy vs. Jason. The adult role of Jason Voorhees has been played by various actors, some not credited, others taking great pride in their parts. Due to the physical demands the adult character requires, and the lack of emotional depth depicted, many of the actors since have been stuntmen. The most well known among them is Kane Hodder, who is cited as the best to play the role.

Many ideas were suggested for the sequel to Friday the 13th, including making the title part of a serialized film series, where each succeeding film would be its own story and not related to any previous film under the Friday the 13th moniker. It was Phil Scuderi, one of the producers for the original film, who suggested bringing Jason back for the sequel. The director Steve Miner felt it was the obvious direction to take the series, as he felt the audience wanted to know more about the child who attacked Alice in the lake. Miner decided to pretend as if Alice did not see the "real Jason" in her dream, and Jason had survived his drowning as a boy and had grown up. After killing Jason in The Final Chapter, it was the director Joseph Zito's intention to leave the door open for the studio to make more films with Tommy Jarvis as the main antagonist. Screenwriter Barney Cohen felt Jarvis would become a substitute for Jason, but the idea was never fully developed in A New Beginning. Director and co-screenwriter Danny Steinmann disliked the idea of Jason not being the killer, but decided to use Tommy's fear of Jason as the primary story. This idea was immediately abandoned in Jason Lives, when A New Beginning did not spark the "creative success" the studio was looking for. Executive producer Frank Mancuso Jr. wanted to bring Jason back, and he did not care how it was achieved. In yet another alteration of the series' continuity, Tom McLoughlin chose to ignore the idea that Jason had survived his drowning, instead presenting him as always having been some sort of supernatural force. Since A New Beginning, no sequel has attempted to replace Jason as the main antagonist. Miller, who has not seen any of the sequels, took issue with all of them because they made Jason the villain. Miller believes the best part of his screenplay was that it was about a mother avenging the senseless death of her son. Miller stated, "Jason was dead from the very beginning; he was a victim, not a villain."

=== Men under the mask ===
So I go from lead role to no role. Needless to say, I was disappointed. But I said, "What the hell?"

— Steve Daskawisz, on losing screen credit

Jason Voorhees went from deceased child to full-grown man for Friday the 13th Part 2, and Warrington Gillette was hired to play the role. Gillette auditioned for the role of Paul; that role eventually went to John Furey. Under the belief that he had attended the Hollywood Stuntman's School, Gillette was offered the role of Jason Voorhees. Initially Gillette was unsure about the character, but the idea of starring in his first film grew on Gillette, and he also thought the role was amusing. It became apparent Gillette could not perform the necessary stunts, so the stunt coordinator Cliff Cudney brought in Steve Daskawisz. Daskawisz filmed all of the scenes except the opening sequence and the unmasking shot at the end; Gillette returned for the unmasking scenes. Gillette received credit for playing Jason, while Daskawisz was given credit as the stunt double. When Part 3 was released the following year, Daskawisz was credited as Jason for the reused footage from the climax of the film. Initially, Daskawisz was asked to return to the role for Part 3, but it would have required him to pay for his own transportation and housing during filming. Having secured a part on Guiding Light, Daskawisz declined.

Now wanting a "bigger and stronger-looking" Jason, one that was also "more athletic and powerful", Steve Miner hired British former trapeze artist Richard Brooker. After a conversation, Miner decided he was the right person for the job. Being new to the country, Brooker believed that "playing a psychopathic killer" was the best way into the movie business. Brooker became the first actor to wear Jason's now-signature hockey mask. According to Brooker, "It felt great with the mask on. It just felt like I really was Jason because I didn't have anything to wear before that." For The Final Chapter, Joseph Zito brought his own spin to the character, one that required a "real hardcore stuntman"; Ted White was hired to perform the role. White, who only took the job for the money, did "get into the Jason psychology" when he arrived on the set. White went so far as to not speak to any of the other actors for long stretches. As filming continued, White's experience was not pleasant, and in one instance, he went to battle for co-star Judie Aronson, who played Samantha, when the director kept her naked in the lake for extended periods of time. Displeased with his experience from filming, White had his name removed from the credits. As with Friday the 13th Part 2, there was confusion over who performed the role in A New Beginning, partly because Jason is not the literal antagonist in the film. When Ted White turned down the opportunity to return, Dick Wieand was cast. Wieand is credited as Roy Burns, the film's actual murderer, but it was stuntman Tom Morga who performed in the few flashes of Jason, as well as portraying Roy in almost all of the masked scenes. Wieand has been outspoken about his lack of enthusiasm over his role in the film. Feeling alienated during the shoot, Wieand spent most of his time in his trailer. By comparison, Morga enjoyed his time as Jason and made sure he "really got into the character".

It's like all of a sudden you get to put a baseball uniform on, and you're the pitcher in the ninth inning of the World Series. It's an incredible feeling.

— C. J. Graham, on his experience as Jason

A nightclub manager in Glendale, C. J. Graham, was interviewed for the role of Jason in Jason Lives, but was initially passed over because he had no experience as a stuntman. Dan Bradley was hired, but Paramount executives felt Bradley did not have the right physique to play the role, and Graham was hired to replace him. Although Bradley was replaced early during filming, he can be seen in the paintball sequence of the film. Graham opted to perform most of his own stunts, including the scene where Jason catches on fire while battling Tommy in the lake. The rest of the cast spoke highly of Graham, remarking that he never complained during all the uncomfortable situations he was placed in. Graham had no intention of being an actor or a stuntman, but the idea of playing the "bad guy", and the opportunity to wear the prosthetics, intrigued him. Graham was not brought back to reprise the role, but has often been cited as speaking highly of his time in the part.

Kane Hodder took over the role in The New Blood, and played Jason in the next four films. He previously worked alongside director John Carl Buechler on a film called Prison. Based on his experience working with Hodder, Buechler petitioned Frank Mancuso Jr. to hire him, but Mancuso was apprehensive about Hodder's limited size. Knowing he planned to use full body prosthetics, Buechler scheduled a test screening, the first in Friday the 13th history for the character, and Mancuso immediately gave Hodder approval upon seeing him. It is Buechler's contention that Hodder gave Jason his first true personality, based on the emotions, specifically the rage, that Hodder would emit while acting the part. According to Hodder, he wanted to "get in touch with Jason's thirst for revenge" and try to better understand his motivation to kill. After viewing the previous films, Hodder decided that he would approach Jason as a more "quick and agile" individual than he had been portrayed in the previous sequels. John Carl Buechler felt that Kane had "natural affinity for the role"—so much that Kane's appearance, when wearing the mask, would often terrify the cast, the crew, and in one incident a lone stranger that he came across on his walk back to his trailer. Initially Frank Mancuso Jr. and Barbara Sachs planned to use a Canadian stuntperson for Jason Takes Manhattan. Hodder acted as his own voice, calling and requesting that he be allowed to reprise the role; the ultimate decision was left to director Rob Hedden, who intended to use Hodder, because he felt Hodder knew the lore of the series. With Sean Cunningham's return as producer for Jason Goes to Hell, Hodder felt his chances of reprising the role were even better: Hodder had worked as Cunningham's stunt coordinator for years. Regardless, Adam Marcus, the director for Jason Goes to Hell, always intended to hire Hodder for the role. Jason X would mark Hodder's last performance as Jason, to date. Todd Farmer, who wrote the screenplay for Jason X, knew that Hodder would play Jason from the beginning. Jim Isaac was a fan of Hodder's work on the previous films, so hiring him was an easy decision.

New Line believed Freddy vs. Jason needed a fresh start, and choose a new actor for Jason. Cunningham disagreed with their decision, believing Hodder was the best choice for the role. Hodder did receive the script for Freddy vs. Jason, and had a meeting with director Ronny Yu and New Line executives, but Matthew Barry and Yu felt the role should be recast to fit Yu's image of Jason. According to Hodder, New Line failed to provide him with a reason for the recasting, but Yu has explained he wanted a slower, more deliberate Jason, and less of the aggressive movements that Hodder had used in the previous films. Yu and development executive Jeff Katz recognized the outcry among fans over the replacement of Hodder as Jason, but stood by their choice in recasting.

The role eventually went to Ken Kirzinger, a Canadian stuntman who worked on Jason Takes Manhattan. There are conflicting reports over the reason Kirzinger was cast. According to Yu, Kirzinger was hired because he was taller than Robert Englund, the actor who portrays Freddy Krueger. Kirzinger stands 6 feet 5 inches (1.96 m), compared to the 6 feet 3 inches (1.91 m) of Kane Hodder, and Yu wanted a much larger actor to tower over the 5-foot-10-inch (1.78 m) Englund. Kirzinger believes his experience on Part VIII helped him land the part, as Kirzinger doubled for Hodder on two scenes for the film, but also believes he was simply sized up and handed the job. Although he was hired by the creative crew, New Line did not officially cast Kirzinger until first seeing him on film. Kirzinger's first scene was Jason walking down Elm Street. New Line wanted a specific movement in Jason's walk; Kirzinger met their expectations and signed a contract with the studio. However, concerns that test audiences were confused by the film's original ending caused the studio to reshoot the final scene. Actor Douglas Tait was brought in to film the new ending, as he was available for the reshoot and had been the production's second choice to portray the role of Jason during the original casting.

For the 2009 remake, stuntman Derek Mears was hired to portray Jason Voorhees at the recommendation of makeup special effects supervisor Scott Stoddard. Mears's pleasant demeanor had the studio worried about his ability to portray such a menacing character on screen, but Mears assured them he would be able to perform the role. When Mears auditioned for the role he was asked why they should hire an actor over just another guy in a mask. As Mears explained, portraying Jason is similar to Greek mask work, where the mask and the actor are two separate entities, and, based on the scene, there will be various combinations of mask and actor in the performance.

=== Design ===
The physical design of Jason Voorhees has gone through changes, some subtle and some radical. For Friday the 13th, the task of coming up with Jason's appearance was the responsibility of Tom Savini, whose design for Jason was inspired by someone Savini knew as a child whose eyes and ears did not line up straight. The original design called for Jason to have hair, but Savini and his crew opted to make him bald, so he would look like a "hydrocephalic, mongoloid pinhead", with a dome-shaped head. Savini created a plaster mold of Ari Lehman's head and used that to create prosthetics for his face. Lehman personally placed mud—from the bottom of the lake—all over his body to make himself appear "really slimy."

For Part 2, Steve Miner asked Carl Fullerton, the make-up effects supervisor, to stick to Savini's original design, but Fullerton only had one day to design and sculpt a new head. Fullerton drew a rough sketch of what he believed Jason should look like, and had it approved by Miner. Fullerton added long hair to the character. Gillette had to spend hours in a chair as they applied rubber forms all over his face, and had to keep one eye closed while the "droopy eye" application was in place. Gillette's eye was closed for twelve hours at a time while he was filming the final scenes of the film. False teeth created by a local dentist were used to distort Gillette's face. Much of the basic concept of Fullerton's design was eliminated for Part 3. Miner wanted to use a combination of the designs from Tom Savini and Carl Fullerton, but as work progressed the design began to lean more and more toward Savini's concept. Stan Winston was hired to create a design for Jason's head, but the eyes were level and Doug White, the make-up artist for Part 3, needed a droopy right eye. White did keep Winston's design for the back of the head, because the crew did not have the time to design an entirely new head for Jason. The process of creating Jason's look was hard work for White, who had to constantly make alterations to Richard Brooker's face, even up to the last day of filming.

Jason's original mask was molded from a Detroit Red Wings goalie mask, and would become a staple for the character for the rest of the series.

The script for Part 3 called for Jason to wear a mask to cover his face, having worn a bag over his head in Part 2; what no one knew at the time was that the mask chosen would become a trademark for the character, and one instantly recognizable in popular culture in the years to come. During production, Steve Miner called for a lighting check. None of the effects crew wanted to apply any make-up for the light check, so they decided to just throw a mask on Brooker. The film's 3D effects supervisor, Martin Jay Sadoff, was a hockey fan, and had a bag of hockey gear with him on the set. He pulled out a Detroit Red Wings goaltender mask for the test. Miner loved the mask, but it was too small. Doug White enlarged the mask using a Vac-U-Form to create a new mold to work with. After White finished the molds, Terry Ballard placed red triangles on the mask to give it a unique appearance. Holes were punched into the mask and the markings were altered, making it different from Sadoff's mask. There were two prosthetic face masks created for Richard Brooker to wear underneath the hockey mask. One mask was composed of approximately 11 different appliances and took about six hours to apply to Brooker's face; this mask was used for scenes where the hockey mask was removed. In the scenes where the hockey mask is over the face, a simple head mask was created. This one-piece mask would slip on over Brooker's head, exposing his face but not the rest of his head.

Tom Savini agreed to return to make-up duties for The Final Chapter because he felt he should be the one to bring Jason full circle in terms of his look from child to man. Savini used his design from the original Friday the 13th, with the same practice of application as before, but molded from Ted White's face. Since Jason is not the actual killer in A New Beginning, it was not necessary to do any major designing for Jason's look. Only a head mask to cover the top and back of the head, like the one Brooker wore while wearing the hockey mask, was needed for the film. Make-up artist Louis Lazzara, who cites A New Beginning as almost a direct sequel to The Final Chapter, did base his head-mask on Tom Savini's design for The Final Chapter.

Friday the 13th Part VII: The New Blood sought to make Jason more of a "classic monster along the lines of Frankenstein." From the beginning, Buechler tried to tie the previous films together by having Jason's appearance reflect that of the damage he received in the previous installments. Buechler wanted the motor boat damage from Jason Lives, and the axe and machete cuts Jason received in Part 3 and Part 4 to part of the design for The New Blood. Since Jason had been submerged under water in the previous entry, the effects team wanted Jason to appear "rotted", with bones and ribs showing, and for Jason's features to have a more defined feel to them. Howard Berger was inspired by Carl Fullerton's design in The New Blood, and wanted to incorporate the exposed flesh concept into his model for Jason Goes to Hell. Berger designed Jason's skin to overlap with the mask, to make it appear as if the skin and mask had fused and the mask could no longer be removed. Gregory Nicotero and Berger sculpted a full-body, foam latex suit for Kane Hodder to wear under the costume. The idea was to reveal as much of Jason's skin as possible, because Nicotero and Berger knew the physical character would not be seen for most of the film.

Original concept drawings for "Über-Jason", by makeup effects supervisor Stephan Dupuis, took months to plan. Dupuis sculpted a small-scale version of the new design to show off to the filmmakers, before finally taking mold castings of Kane Hodder.

Stephan Dupuis was given the task of redesigning Jason for the tenth Friday the 13th film. One concept brought into the film was Jason's regenerative abilities. Dupuis gave the character more hair and more of a natural flesh appearance to illustrate the constant regeneration the character goes through; Dupuis wanted a more "gothic" design for Jason, so he added chains and shackles, and made the hockey mask more angular. Jim Isaac and the rest of his crew wanted to create an entirely new Jason at some point in the film. The idea was for the teens to completely destroy Jason's body, allowing the futuristic technology to bring him back to life. What was referred to as Über-Jason was designed to have chunks of metal growing from his body, bonded by tendrils that grew into the metal, all pushing through a leather suit. The metal was created using a Vac-U-Form, the same method used to increase the size of the original hockey mask, and was attached by Velcro. The tendrils were made from silicone. All of the pieces were crafted onto one suit, including an entire head piece, which Hodder wore. The make-up effects team added zippers along the side of the suit, which allowed Hodder to enter and exit the suit within 15 minutes.

By the time Freddy vs. Jason entered production there had been ten previous Friday the 13th films. Make-up effects artist Terezakis wanted to put his own mark on Jason's look—he wanted Jason to be less rotted and decomposed and more defined, so that the audience would see a new Jason, but still recognized the face. Terezakis tried to keep continuity with the previous films, but recognized that had he followed them too literally, then "Jason would have been reduced to a pile of goo." Ronny Yu wanted everything surrounding the hockey mask to act as a frame, making the mask the focal point of each shot. To achieve this, Terezakis created a "pooled-blood look" for the character by painting the skin black, based on the idea the blood had pooled in the back of his head because he had been lying on his back for a long time. As with other make-up artists before him, Terezakis followed Savini's original skull design, and aged it appropriately.

For the 2009 version of Friday the 13th, effects artist Scott Stoddard took inspiration from Carl Fullerton's design in Friday the 13th Part 2 and Tom Savini's work in Friday the 13th: The Final Chapter. Stoddard wanted to make sure that Jason appeared human and not like a monster. Stoddard's vision of Jason includes hair loss, skin rashes, and the traditional deformities in his face, but he attempted to craft Jason's look in a way that would allow for a more human side to be seen. Stoddard took inspiration from the third and fourth films when designing Jason's hockey mask. The make-up artist managed to acquire an original set piece, which he studied and later sculpted. Although he had a model of one of the original masks, Stoddard did not want to replicate it in its entirety. As Stoddard explains, "Because I didn't want to take something that already existed, there were things I thought were great, but there were things I wanted to change a bit. Make it custom, but keep all the fundamental designs. Especially the markings on the forehead and cheeks. Age them down a bit, break them up." In the end, Stoddard crafted six versions of the mask, each with varying degrees of wear.

== Characteristics ==
In his original appearance, Jason was scripted as a mentally disabled young boy. Since Friday the 13th, Jason Voorhees has been depicted as a non-verbal, indestructible, machete-wielding mass murderer. Jason is primarily portrayed as being completely silent throughout the film series. Exceptions to this include in Part III when he grunts in pain several times when final girl Chris manages to stab him (once in the hand and once just above his knee), flashbacks of Jason as a child, a brief scene in Jason Takes Manhattan where the character cries out "Mommy, please don't let me drown!" in a child's voice before being submerged in toxic waste, and in Jason Goes to Hell where his spirit possesses other individuals. Online magazine Salon's Andrew O'Hehir describes Jason as a "silent, expressionless...blank slate." When discussing Jason psychologically, Sean S. Cunningham said, "...he doesn't have any personality. He's like a great white shark. You can't really defeat him. All you can hope for is to survive." Since Friday the 13th Part VI: Jason Lives, Jason has been a "virtually indestructible" being. Tom McLoughlin, the film's director, felt it was silly that Jason had previously been just another guy in a mask, who would kill people left and right, but get "beaten up and knocked down by the heroine at the end". McLoughlin wanted Jason to be more of a "formidable, unstoppable monster". In resurrecting Jason from the dead, McLoughlin also gave him the weakness of being rendered helpless if trapped beneath the waters of Crystal Lake; inspired by vampire lore, McLoughlin decided that Jason had in fact drowned as a child, and that returning him to his original resting place would immobilize him. This weakness would be presented again in The New Blood, and the idea that Jason had drowned as a child was taken up by director Rob Hedden as a plot element in Jason Takes Manhattan.

Many have given suggestions as Jason's motivation for killing. Ken Kirzinger refers to Jason as a "psychotic mama's boy gone horribly awry...very resilient. You can't kill him, but he feels pain, just not like everyone else." Kirzinger goes on to say that Jason is a "psycho-savant", and believes his actions are based on pleasing his mother, and not anything personal. Andrew O'Hehir has stated, "Coursing hormones act, of course, as smelling salts to prudish Jason, that ever-vigilant enforcer of William Bennett-style values." Todd Farmer, writer for Jason X, wrote the scene where Jason wakes from cryonic hibernation just as two of the teenagers are having sex. Farmer liked the idea that sex acts triggered Jason back to life. Whatever his motivations, Kane Hodder believes there is a limit to what he will do. According to Hodder, Jason might violently murder any person he comes across, but when Jason Takes Manhattan called for Hodder to kick the lead character's dog, Hodder refused, stating that, while Jason has no qualms against killing humans, he is not bad enough to hurt animals. Another example from Jason Takes Manhattan, involves Jason being confronted by a street gang of young teenage boys one of whom threatens him with a knife, however Jason chooses not to kill them and instead scares them off by lifting up his mask and showing them his face. Likewise, director Tom McLoughlin chose not to have Jason harm any of the children he encounters in Jason Lives, stating that Jason would not kill a child, out of a sympathy for the plight of children generated by his own death as a child.

In Jason Goes to Hell, director Adam Marcus decided to include a copy of the Necronomicon Ex-Mortis, from the Evil Dead franchise, in the Voorhees home as a way to insinuate that Jason was actually a "Deadite", a type of demonic being from that series. Marcus stated the book's placement was intended to imply that Pamela Voorhees had used it to resurrect Jason after his childhood drowning, resulting in his supernatural abilities: "This is why Jason isn't Jason. He's Jason plus The Evil Dead... That, to me, is way more interesting as a mashup, and [Sam] Raimi loved it! It's not like I could tell New Line my plan to include The Evil Dead, because they don't own The Evil Dead. So it had to be an Easter egg, and I did focus on it. It absolutely is canon." In an early draft of Freddy vs. Jason, it was decided that one of the villains needed a redeemable factor. Ronald D. Moore, co-writer of the first draft, explained that Jason was the easiest to make redeemable, because no one had previously ventured into the psychology surrounding the character. Moore saw the character as a "blank slate", and felt he was a character the audience could really root for. Another draft, penned by Mark Protosevich, followed Moore's idea of Jason having a redeemable quality. In the draft, Jason protects a pregnant teenager named Rachel Daniels. Protosevich explained, "It gets into this whole idea of there being two kinds of monsters. Freddy is a figure of actual pure evil and Jason is more like a figure of vengeance who punishes people he feels do not deserve to live. Ultimately, the two of them clash and Jason becomes an honorable monster." Writers Damian Shannon and Mark Swift, who wrote the final draft of the film, disagreed about making Jason a hero, although they drew comparisons between the fact that Freddy was a victimizer and Jason was a victim. They stated, "We did not want to make Jason any less scary. He's still a brutal killer ... We never wanted to put them in a situation where Jason is a hero ... They're both villains to be equally feared." Brenna O'Brien, co-founder of Fridaythe13thfilms.com, saw the character as having sympathetic qualities. She stated, "[Jason] was a deformed child who almost drowned and then spent the rest of his childhood growing up alone in the woods. He saw his mother get murdered by a camp counselor in the first Friday the 13th, and so now he exacts his revenge on anyone who returns to Camp Crystal Lake. Teenage fans can identify with that sense of rejection and isolation, which you can't really get from other killers like Freddy Krueger and Michael Myers."

As Jason went through some characterization changes in the 2009 film, Derek Mears likens him more to a combination of John Rambo, Tarzan, and the Abominable Snowman from Looney Tunes. To him, this Jason is similar to Rambo because he sets up the other characters to fall into his traps. Like Rambo, he is more calculated because he feels that he has been wronged and he is fighting back; he is meant to be more sympathetic in this film. Fuller and Form contend that they did not want to make Jason too sympathetic to the audience. As Brad Fuller explains, "We do not want him to be sympathetic. Jason is not a comedic character, he is not sympathetic. He's a killing machine. Plain and simple."

In 2005, California State University's Media Psychology Lab surveyed 1,166 people Americans aged from 16 to 91 on the psychological appeal of movie monsters. Many of the characteristics associated with Jason Voorhees were appealing to the participants. In the survey, Jason was considered to be an "unstoppable killing machine." Participants were impressed by the "cornucopic feats of slicing and dicing a seemingly endless number of adolescents and the occasional adult." Out of the ten monsters used in the survey—which included vampires, Freddy Krueger, Frankenstein's monster, Michael Myers, Godzilla, Chucky, Hannibal Lecter, King Kong and the Alien—Jason scored the highest in all the categories involving killing variables. Further characteristics that appealed to the participants included Jason's "immortality, his apparent enjoyment of killing [and] his superhuman strength."

== Reception ==
In 1988, Screamin' toys introduced the build-it yourself Jason figure.

=== Popularity ===
Jason Voorhees is one of the leading cultural icons of American popular culture. In 1992 Jason was awarded the MTV Lifetime Achievement Award. He was the first of only three completely fictional characters to be presented the award; Godzilla (1996) and Chewbacca (1997) are the others. Jason was named No. 26 in Wizard magazine's "100 greatest villains of all time". Universal Studios Theme Parks, in collaboration with New Line Cinema, used the character for their Halloween Horror Nights event. In June 2020, Jason appears in a PSA to encourage people to wear a mask during the COVID-19 pandemic. In October 2021, IGN named Jason the "Greatest Movie Slasher of All Time", while Scott Gleeson of USA Today named Jason the 2nd most "haunting horror movie villain". Red Bull called Jason as one of the scariest video game villains of all time, because "playing as Jason is loads of fun, but having to run and hide from him is as exhilarating as it is terrifying."

The character has been produced and marketed as merchandise over the years. In 1988 Screamin' Toys produced a model kit where owners could build their own Jason statuette. The kit required the owner to cut and paint various parts to assemble the figure. Six years later, Screamin' Toys issued a new model kit for Jason Goes to Hell. Both kits are now out of production. McFarlane Toys released two toy lines, one in 1998 and the other in 2002. The first was a figure of Jason from Jason Goes to Hell, and the other was of Über-Jason from Jason X. Since McFarlane's last toy line in 2002, there has been a steady production of action figures, dolls, and statuettes. These include tie-ins with the film Freddy vs. Jason (2003). In April 2010 Sideshow Toys released a polystone statue of Jason, based on the version appearing in the 2009 remake. NECA and Mezco Toyz also released figures of Jason in its own action figure series.

=== Cultural impact ===
The character has been referenced, or made cameo appearances, in various entertainment mediums. Outside literature sources based on the character, Jason has been featured in a variety of magazines and comic strips. Cracked magazine has released several issues featuring parodies of Jason, and he has been featured on two of their covers. Mad magazine has featured the character in almost a dozen stories. He has appeared twice in the comic strip Mother Goose and Grimm. The Usagi Yojimbo antagonist Jei is based on Voorhees; his name, with the honorific "-san" attached, is in fact a pun on Voorhees' first name.

Many musical artists have made references to Jason Voorhees. Inspired by his own experience, Ari Lehman founded a band called "First Jason". Lehman's band is classified as horror punk, and is influenced by the sounds of the Dead Kennedys and the Misfits. The band's name pays homage to Lehman's portrayal of Jason Voorhees in the original Friday the 13th. One of the band's songs is entitled "Jason is Watching". In 1986, coinciding with the release of Jason Lives, Alice Cooper released "He's Back (The Man Behind the Mask)" from his album Constrictor. The song was written to "signal Jason's big return" to cinema, as he had been almost entirely absent in the previous film in the series. Rapper Eminem has referenced Jason in several of his songs. The song "Criminal", from the album The Marshall Mathers LP, mentions Jason specifically, while songs "Amityville" and "Off the Wall"—the latter featured fellow rapper Redman—contain Harry Manfredini's music "ki, ki, ki ... ma, ma, ma" from the film series. Eminem sometimes wears a hockey mask during concerts. Other rap artists that have referenced Jason include Tupac Shakur, Dr. Dre, LL Cool J, and Insane Clown Posse. In 1989, Puerto Rican rapper Vico C had a song titled "Viernes 13" which featured Jason in Puerto Rico. The song was so popular in the island that Vico C wrote a second part titled "Viernes 13, Parte II". VH1 issued an advertisement for their Vogue Fashion Awards which was labeled "Friday the 20th", and featured Jason's mask created out of rhinestone.The music videos for Chicago band Common Shiner's "Social Mediasochist" and "On and On" both feature Jason as the main protagonist, where he is portrayed by Jeremy Kanne. These videos also serve as crossovers with other horror film characters, with the first video depicting Jason as a teenage student of "Wes Craven's Slasher High School" and being caught in a love triangle where he competes with Michael Myers for the love of Carrie White, and the second video being a sequel following Jason and Carrie in their marriage.

Jason has been referenced or parodied in other films. The 1988 British film Unmasked Part 25, whose title lampoons the high number of installments in slasher film series like Friday the 13th, features a hockey mask-wearing serial killer named Jackson who grows tired of his routine murder sprees and develops a romance with a young woman. In the 1996 film Scream, directed by Elm Street creator Wes Craven, actress Drew Barrymore's character Casey Becker is being stalked by a killer who calls her on her home phone. To survive, she must answer the man's trivia questions. One question is "name the killer in Friday the 13th." She incorrectly guesses Jason, who did not become the killer for the film series until Part 2. Writer Kevin Williamson claimed his inspiration for this scene came when he asked this question in a bar while a group was playing a movie trivia quiz game. He received a free drink, because nobody got the answer right. In another Wes Craven film, Cursed, a wax sculpture of Jason, from Jason Goes to Hell, can be seen in a wax museum. In 2014, Jason made a cameo appearance in the RadioShack Super Bowl XLVIII commercial "The '80s Called".

Jason has also been referenced by several television shows. The stop motion animated television series Robot Chicken features Jason in three of its comedy sketches. In episode seventeen, "Operation: Rich in Spirit", the mystery-solving teenagers from Scooby-Doo arrive at Camp Crystal Lake to investigate the Jason Voorhees murders, and are killed off one by one as well as killing Don Knotts. Velma is the only survivor, and in typical Scooby-Doo fashion, she rips off Jason's mask to reveal his true identity: Old Man Phillips. In "That Hurts Me", Jason reappears, this time as a housemate of "Horror Movie Big Brother", alongside other famous slasher movie killers such as Michael Myers, Freddy Krueger, Leatherface, Pinhead and Ghostface. Three years later, in episode sixty-two, Jason is shown on the days before and after a typical Friday the 13th. Jason is spoofed in the season five episode of Family Guy entitled "It Takes a Village Idiot, and I Married One". The so-called "Mr. Voorhees" explains to Asian reporter Trisha Takanawa how happy he is to see local wildlife return following the cleanup and rejuvenation of Lake Quahog. He reappears later in the episode as the manager of the "Britches and Hose" clothing store. As opposed to his monstrous personality in the films, Jason is depicted here as polite and articulate, albeit still a psychopath; he murders random swimmers and threatens to kill his employee if she screws up. In an episode of The Simpsons, Jason appears in a Halloween episode sitting on the couch with Freddy Krueger waiting for the family to arrive. When Freddy asks where the family is, Jason responds, "Ehh, whaddya gonna do?" and turns the TV on. He also appears in The Simpsons episode "Stop, or My Dog Will Shoot!", alongside Pinhead, menacing Bart in a fantasy sequence. The South Park episodes "Imaginationland Episode II" and "III" feature Jason among an assortment of other villains and monsters as an inhabitant of the "bad side" of Imaginationland, a world populated by fictional characters. This version of Jason has an effeminate voice and describes the removal of Strawberry Shortcake's eyeball as "super hardcore". Experimental pop artist Eric Millikin created a large mosaic portrait of Jason Voorhees out of Halloween candy and spiders as part of his "Totally Sweet" series in 2013.

== See also ==
- Disability in horror films

== Bibliography ==
- Bracke, Peter (2006). Crystal Lake Memories. London: Titan Books. ISBN 978-1-84576-343-5.
- Grove, David (2005). Making Friday the 13th: The Legend of Camp Blood. Godalming, England: FAB Press. ISBN 978-1-903254-31-8.
