= Jason X: Death Moon =

British fiction horror novel

- Author: Alex S. Johnson
- Language: English
- Series: Jason X
- Release number: 4
- Genre: Horror, science fiction
- Publisher: Black Flame (UK); Simon & Schuster (US)
- Publication date: 29 November 2005
- Publication place: United Kingdom
- Media type: Print (Paperback)
- Pages: 414
- ISBN: 9781844162734
- OCLC: 61879352
- Preceded by: Jason X: Planet of the Beast
- Followed by: Jason X: To the Third Power

Jason X: Death Moon is a 2005 British science fiction horror novel written by Alex S. Johnson and published by Black Flame. A tie-in to the Friday the 13th series of American horror films, it is the fourth in a series of five Jason X novels published by Black Flame and is set in Moon Camp Americana, a reformatory for wayward girls that is attacked by undead cyborg Jason Voorhees.

== Plot ==
The New American Republic commandeers a space freighter to track down Jason Voorhees, an undead cyborg last sighted on a research station orbiting Planet #666. Upon finding Jason, nano spiders capture him, bring him aboard the freighter, and murder everyone else on the ship before delivering Jason to Elysium, the moon of Earth II. Elysium contains a laboratory run by Doctor Armando Castillo, a one-eyed necrophile hired to experiment on Jason by the Teknopriests, the mind-linked cabal that runs the NAR, including the still-active MKUltra Program. Also on Elysium is Moon Camp Americana, a newly opened "finishing school" for the teenage daughters of the NAR's political elite, all of whom are worried about an election set to be held soon by the Teknopriests. The girls include April Carlson, a senator's delinquent daughter who was arrested after she and her friends hijacked a hovercar and went on a narcotics binge through New Rose City. The goings-on at Moon Camp Americana are to be documented and televised by an "art porn" director named Roger Bordeaux and his assistant, Lisa Foxx, while the camp itself is overseen by Helga Van Schmerz, a sadistic lesbian Nazi who has been in and out of cryonic suspension since World War II.

The Department of Public Disinformation, not trusting Castillo, recruits Juan Jimenez "JJ" Gonzales, a hacktivist whose parents were killed by Castillo, to spy on Castillo. Castillo begins murdering the campers and staff of Moon Camp Americana to acquire fresh bodies for his experiments with Jason. Castillo dresses as Jason during his killing spree, which he is assisted in by a zombie-like clone of Jason's mother, Pamela. As Van Schmerz tortures and brainwashes the Moon Camp Americana girls, who are to be judged in an "Extreme Beauty" contest by the Teknopriests, Castillo works to find ways to clone or control Jason. After Jason escapes and runs amok, murdering hundreds, among them April, Lisa, and Bordeaux's actresses, he is blown apart by a WMD called the Berzerker. Castillo rebuilds Jason and attempts to fuse him with his A.I. assistant, Major Tom. JJ kills Van Schmerz to save Amanda Cartwright. Amanda is the daughter of a government propagandist and infiltrated Moon Camp Americana after anonymously contacting JJ, who taught Amanda to stay in touch with him through a virtual state of consciousness known as Akasha.net.

Jason goes on another rampage, murdering Castillo, and is exposed to the time-space warping drive kernel of a spaceship, which splits him into his pre-cyborg self and Überjason. Überjason fights and absorbs his past self and is flung into a wormhole by Amanda and JJ, who have celebratory sex with Castillo's android dominatrix, Pinkie 3K. Jason is bumped out of the wormhole by London Jefferson's abandoned space shuttle, which had earlier been sucked into the same vortex while fleeing Planet #666. Jason is deposited elsewhere on Elysium and makes his way to the nearby Moon City, the inhabitants of which he begins slaughtering, as a copy of Jason's essence is revealed to exist within Major Tom back in the abandoned Moon Camp Americana.

== Publication ==
Nancy Kilpatrick, author of the previous Jason X novel, Planet of the Beast, had planned on also writing the proceeding book, but Black Flame had already commissioned Alex S. Johnson to author the next Jason X novel, Death Moon. Death Moon was Johnson's first published novel, and, while acknowledging the "mostly terrible reviews" it received, Johnson still feels he did "a pretty damn good job with it despite being limited by the parameters of the movie series."

== Reception ==
In a dual review written for Chronicle, Don D'Ammassa felt that Friday the 13th: Hate-Kill-Repeat was better written and more plausible than Death Moon, but that Death Moon was more amusing and intriguing than Hate-Kill-Repeat. Author Nancy Kilpatrick, after reading Death Moon in preparation for writing the following Jason X novel, called it "pretty damned weird." Nat Brehmer of Bloody Disgusting opined that author Alex S. Johnson's style of writing made it difficult to know what was happening throughout most of Death Moon but enjoyed the novel regardless, concluding, "I'm not sure this book would be half as memorable if it were remotely digestible or made a lick of sense." Cole Hediger, in an overview of the Jason X novels written for Bookstr, concluded, "The highly action-packed stories and militarized version of Jason make for a more science-fiction spin on the traditional Jason. That being said, for horror fans who are looking for more chills than thrills, this series may not be the fit for you. The Jason X series is written more for those looking for a harder science fiction read or action-packed novel."
