= Tom Morga =

American actor

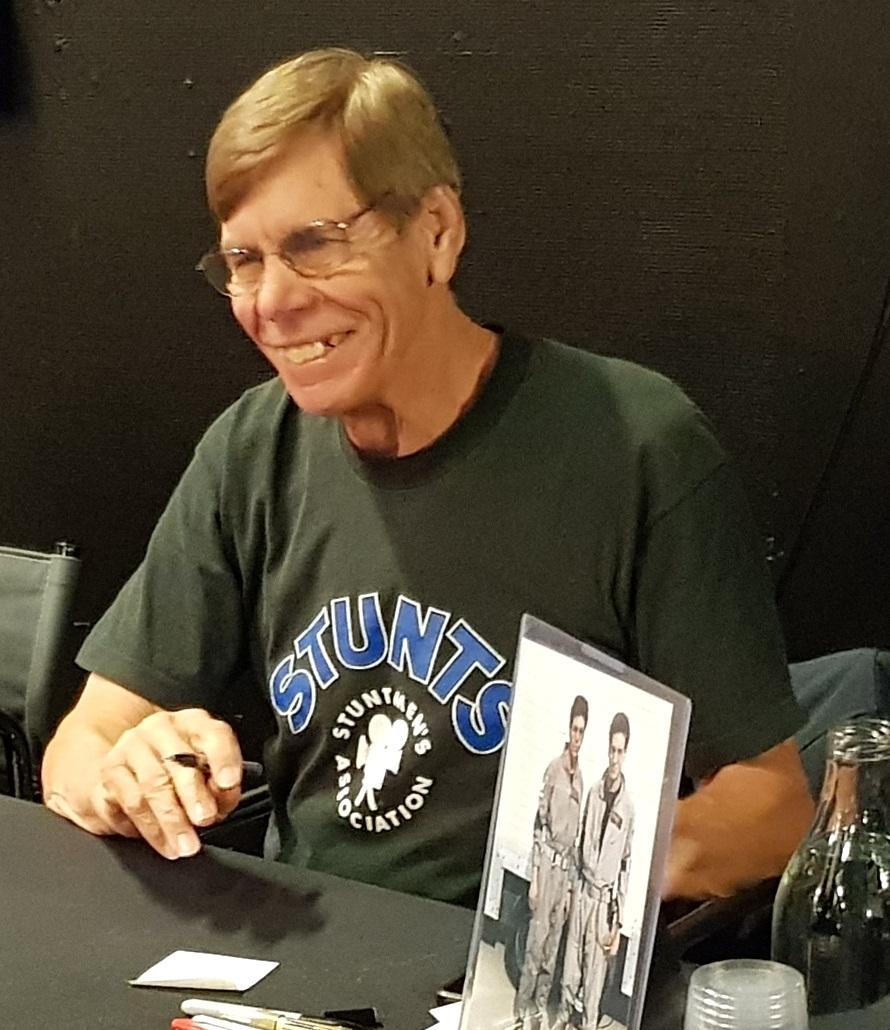
- Tom Morga at the Scandinavian Sci-Fi, Game & Film Convention in Helsingborg, Sweden.
- Born: Thomas Alvin Morga; November 27, 1941 (age 84); Burbank, California, US
- Occupations: Stunt performer, stunt coordinator
- Years active: 1976–present
- Awards: Taurus Award 2007 for Pirates of the Caribbean: Dead Man's Chest
- Website: tommorga.com

Thomas Alvin Morga is an American stuntman, stunt coordinator, and actor best known for his various roles in Star Trek and for being the only actor to play Jason Voorhees, Leatherface and Michael Myers.

== Career ==
Morga began stunt work in the mid-1970s. He later began working as a stunt double for Patrick Duffy in Man from Atlantis. Since then, Morga has doubled for several actors in feature films and television. His work also includes stunt and non-stunt acting roles in numerous Star Trek films and television episodes. However he only received credit for a very little number of his appearances.

== Jason Voorhees, Leatherface and Michael Myers ==
In 1985, Morga portrayed Jason Voorhees in Friday the 13th: A New Beginning during Tommy's hallucinations except for the opening dream sequence where he was played by stuntman John Hock who was personally selected by him to fill-in during his absence. He also stunt-doubled for Dick Wieand, who played Jason's imposter Roy Burns during the film playing him in almost all masked scenes except for a few filmed with Hock. He portrayed Leatherface in the bridge scene of The Texas Chainsaw Massacre 2. He also portrayed Michael Myers in the first half of Halloween 4: The Return of Michael Myers, but was ultimately replaced by George P. Wilbur. Morga appeared as himself in the Friday the 13th documentaries with films His Name Was Jason: 30 Years of Friday the 13th (2009) and Crystal Lake Memories: The Complete History of Friday the 13th (2013) and the web series Friday the 13th: Camp Crystal Legacy (2026), respectively.

== Awards ==
Morga was co-winner of a 2007 Taurus World Stunt Award for "Best Fight" in Pirates of the Caribbean: Dead Man's Chest. He was also part of the stunt team nominated for a 2007 Screen Actors Guild Award nomination for "Outstanding Performance by a Stunt Ensemble in a Motion Picture" in Pirates of the Caribbean: At World's End.
