= Child of the Night (novel) =

1996 novel by Nancy Kilpatrick

Child of the Night is a novel by Nancy Kilpatrick published by Raven in 1996. The novel was nominated for both the 1996 Bram Stoker Award for Best Novel and the 1997 Aurora Awards.

== Plot summary ==
Child of the Night is a novel in which American divorcee Carol Robins flees to Europe from the betrayal that ended her marriage, where she encounters the sexually sadistic vampire Andre.

== Reception ==
Maryanne Booth reviewed Child of the Night for Arcane magazine, rating it a 6 out of 10 overall. Booth comments that "Best described as an erotic Mills & Boon 'girl meets S&M monster', writhing with emotional and colourful passages. Largely a fun read, though more than a tad morally questionable in places. Intriguing, but not comparable to Anne Rice at her best."

== Reviews ==
- Review by Chris Gilmore (1996) in Interzone, #110 August 1996
- Review by Catherine B. Krusberg (1996) in The Vampire's Crypt #14, Fall 1996
- Review by David Mathew (1999) in Interzone, #144 June 1999
