= Jason X =

2001 film by Jim Isaac

- Theatrical release poster
- Directed by: James Isaac
- Written by: Todd Farmer
- Based on: Characters by Victor Miller
- Produced by: Sean S. Cunningham; Noel J. Cunningham
- Starring: Kane Hodder
- Cinematography: Derick Underschultz
- Edited by: David Handman
- Music by: Harry Manfredini
- Production company: Crystal Lake Entertainment
- Distributed by: New Line Cinema
- Release dates: November 15, 2001 (Spain); April 26, 2002 (United States)
- Running time: 92 minutes
- Country: United States
- Language: English
- Budget: $11–14 million
- Box office: $17.1 million

Jason X is a 2001 science fiction and slasher film directed by James Isaac and written by Todd Farmer. It is the tenth installment in the Friday the 13th franchise. It stars Lexa Doig, Lisa Ryder, Chuck Campbell, and Kane Hodder in his fourth and final appearance as Jason Voorhees. In the film, Jason is cryogenically frozen for over 400 years and awakens on a spaceship after being found by a group of students whom he kills one by one.

While the previous films show Jason as a human serial killer or undead monster, this film depicts him as a superhuman who is transformed by future technology into a cyborg. This cyborg incarnation has been called Jason X in tie-in media and in the film’s credits but is also often referred to as Uber Jason (a nickname the art design team and production crew used, and which appeared in later comic books Jason X Special and Friday the 13th: Jason vs. Jason X). When conceiving the film, Todd Farmer came up with the idea of sending Jason into space, suggesting to the studio that it was the only direction left for the series.

Jason X was theatrically released in the United States on April 26, 2002. The film received negative reviews and underperformed at the box-office, grossing $17.1 million on a budget of $11–14 million.

== Plot ==
In 2008, mass murderer Jason Voorhees is captured by the United States government and held at the Crystal Lake Research Facility. By 2010, after numerous failed attempts to kill him, Rowan LaFontaine, the head of the facility, suggests placing him in cryogenic stasis. Dr. Wimmer and Sergeant Marcus from the Scranton Facility arrive with soldiers, hoping to study Jason's ability to heal from lethal wounds, as they believe it involves rapid cellular regeneration that can be replicated. Jason breaks free of his restraints, killing the soldiers and Dr. Wimmer. Rowan lures him into a cryogenic pod, but he ruptures the pod with his machete, stabbing her in the abdomen. Cryogenic fluid spills into the sealed room, freezing them both.

Around the year 2455, Earth has become so polluted that it can no longer support life, and humans have moved to a new planet named Earth II. On a field trip to Earth I, Professor Brandon Lowe, his android companion KM-14, intern Adrienne Thomas, and students Tsunaron Peyton, Janessa Zachary, Azrael Benrubi, Kinsa Cooper, Waylander, and Stoney explore the abandoned Crystal Lake Research Facility, finding the frozen Jason and Rowan. They bring them aboard their spaceship, the Grendel, and revive Rowan while leaving Jason in the morgue, believing him to be dead.

Adrienne is ordered to dissect Jason's body, but Rowan warns them of Jason's nature and superhuman abilities. Lowe, who is in serious debt, calls his financial backer Dieter Perez on the nearby space station Solaris. Perez recognizes Jason's name and notes his body could interest a collector. While Stoney and Kinsa have sex, Jason suddenly awakens and kills Adrienne by freezing her head with liquid nitrogen and smashing it to pieces on a counter. He finds Stoney and Kinsa, killing the former with a machete-shaped surgical tool. He later interrupts a projected holographic game, breaking Azrael's back and bashing crewman Dallas's skull in. He tries to attack engineer Crutch, but Sergeant Elijah Brodski arrives with a group of soldiers to attack Jason. After Brodski splits up his team, Jason kills them one by one.

Lowe orders pilot Lou to dock at Solaris. Jason kills Lou, and the ship crashes through Solaris, destroying it. Jason breaks into the lab, reclaims his machete, and decapitates Lowe. With the Grendel crippled, the survivors head for a shuttle while Tsunaron upgrades KM-14. After Jason electrocutes Crutch, Kinsa attempts to escape on her own, but forgets to release the shuttle's fuel lines, causing it to crash into the ship and incinerate her. Tsunaron reappears with an upgraded KM-14, who wields weapons and combat skills to stand a better chance against Jason. After having his right arm, left leg, right ribs, and part of his head blasted off by KM-14, Jason's body is knocked into a nanite-equipped medical station. The survivors send a distress call, then set explosive charges to separate the ship's undamaged pontoon from the main section.

The medical station nanites rebuild Jason as a cyborg. With his newfound strength, he easily decapitates KM-14. As Tsunaron recovers her still-functioning head, Jason is stopped by Waylander, who sacrifices himself by setting off the charges while the others escape. Jason survives and punches a hole through the hull, causing Janessa to die in the vacuum. A power failure with the docking door forces Brodski to go outside in an EVA suit to fix it.

To distract Jason, a holographic simulation of Camp Crystal Lake is created with two virtual teenage girls. After "killing" them, he realizes the deception just as the door is fixed. Still in his EVA suit, Brodski confronts Jason so the rest can escape. As they leave, the pontoon explodes, propelling Jason at high speed towards the survivors. Brodski intercepts Jason's space flight and maneuvers them both towards Earth II's atmosphere, where they are both incinerated during atmospheric entry. Tsunaron, Rowan, and KM-14 escape. On Earth II, a pair of teenagers by a lake notice what appears to be a shooting star and go to investigate as Jason's charred mask sinks to the bottom of the lake.

== Cast ==
- Kane Hodder as Jason Voorhees
- Lexa Doig as Rowan LaFontaine
- Lisa Ryder as KM-14
- Chuck Campbell as Tsunaron Peyton
- Melyssa Ade as Janessa Zachary
- Peter Mensah as Sergeant Elijah Brodski
- Melody Johnson as Kirra "Kinsa" Cooper
- Derwin Jordan as Waylander
- Jonathan Potts as Professor Brandon Lowe
- Phillip Williams as Trevor Crutchfield "Crutch"
- Dov Tiefenbach as Azrael Benrubi
- Kristi Angus as Adrienne Thomas
- Dylan Bierk as Private Briggs
- Amanda Brugel as Private Geko
- Barna Moricz as Private Kicker
- Yani Gellman as Stoney
- Todd Farmer as Private Dallas
- Thomas Seniuk as Private Sven
- Steve Lucescu as Private Condor
- David Cronenberg as Dr. Aloysius Wimmer
- Robert A. Silverman as Dieter Perez
- Marcus Parilo as Sgt. Marcus
- Boyd Banks as Louis "Fat Lou" Goddard
- Jeff Geddis as Soldier #1 (Private Samuel Johnson)

== Production ==
Development of Jason X began in the late 1990s while Freddy vs. Jason was still in development hell. With Freddy vs. Jason not moving forward, James Isaac and Sean S. Cunningham decided that they wanted another Friday the 13th film made to retain audience interest in the character. The film was conceived by Todd Farmer, who plays "Dallas" in the film. Farmer considered putting Jason in a variety of new settings before settling on and pitching a space slasher concept modeled on Alien. David Cronenberg rewrote his character's dialogue in the script.

The movie was filmed from March 6 to May 2000 in Toronto.

== Music ==
The film score was composed and performed by Harry Manfredini. It was released by Varèse Sarabande on May 14, 2002.

== Release ==
=== Theatrical ===
Jason X premiered in Spain on November 15, 2001, and was released in the United States on April 26, 2002. A theatrical trailer was released on November 9, 2001.

=== Home media ===
The film was released on VHS and DVD on October 8, 2002. It was released on Blu-ray in 2013, along with the other films in the Friday the 13th: The Complete Collection set.

On October 13, 2020, Scream Factory issued the film again on Blu-ray as part of their 16-disc Friday the 13th Collection set. On May 20, 2025, Arrow Films released Jason X in standalone limited edition 4K UHD Blu-ray set.

== Reception ==
=== Box office ===
The film made $13.1 million in the U.S. and $3.8 million internationally for a worldwide gross of $16.9 million.

=== Critical response and legacy ===
On review aggregator website Rotten Tomatoes Jason X has an approval rating of 27% based on 157 reviews, and an average rating of 3.9/10. The site's critical consensus reads: "Neither scary nor funny, Jason X infuses the series' slasher formula with an obnoxious dose of campy, self-aware humor and low budget sci-fi tackiness to disastrous effect." On Metacritic the film has a weighted average score of 25 out of 100, based on 23 critics, indicating "generally unfavorable" reviews. Audiences polled by CinemaScore gave the film an average grade of "C" on an A+ to F scale.

Roger Ebert gave the film 0.5 stars out of 4, quoting one of the film's lines: "This sucks on so many levels."

The film was better received in the United Kingdom, gaining positive reviews from the country's two major film magazines, Total Film and Empire. Empire's review by Kim Newman in particular praised Jason X as "Wittily scripted, smartly directed and well-played by an unfamiliar cast, this is a real treat for all those who have suffered through the story so far."

The film has seen a retrospective growth in popularity, particularly among younger fans of the series. Praise has been directed at the film's ability to poke fun at itself and the film series as a whole, as well as inventive death scenes; Adrienne's death in particular (head frozen in liquid nitrogen and shattered) is often singled out as a highlight, and was even tested on an episode of MythBusters in 2009.

== Other media and merchandise ==
=== Comic books ===
In 2005, Avatar Press published the Jason X Special comic book as a direct sequel to the movie, written by Brian Pulido, with art by Sebastian Fumara and coloring by Mark Sweeney. The comic reveals that a scientist named Kristen intercepted the Grendel's communications and became interested in uncovering the secret of Jason's regenerative abilities so she could save her lover Neil as well as the human race. To trick the Grendel survivors into bringing Jason to her, she faked the rescue transmission and hacked into their system, using their own holographic technology to convince them they were escaping to Earth II. This resulted in the deaths of all aboard the Grendel. Aboard her ship, Kristen then attempts to study Jason X. Jason’s new cyborg abilities allow him to take control of Kristen's technology. When she attempts to pass on his regenerative abilities to Neil, the nanotechnology in Jason’s blood corrupts Neil and he stabs her. Kristen's ship then comes across a spaceship called Fun Club. After docking, Jason boards the Fun Club and begins killing the crew, ending the story.

In 2006, Avatar Press released a licensed two-issue comic book mini-series called Friday the 13th: Jason vs. Jason X, written and illustrated by Mike Wolfer, with Andrew Dalhouse as colorist. Advertised as a fight between Jason and Jason X, the mini-series is a continuation of the comic Jason X Special. While Jason X is aboard the Fun Club, the story returns to the Grendel drifting in space where a malfunctioning medical station attempts to revive the half of Jason's head that KM-14 shot off in the film. Since the nanotechnology cannot revive only 13% of Jason's body mass into a full living being, it collects the remains of other dead bodies aboard the ship and uses them as raw material. As a result, another version of Jason is resurrected, one who resembles the old version. When scavengers board the Grendel, the old Jason attacks them and uses their shuttle to reach the nearest ship (the Fun Club). There, the old Jason finds Jason X and the two fight while also killing everyone they come across. Each killer is revealed to have only part of the mind and memory of the original Jason. The battle ends when Jason X defeats and rips out the brain matter of the old Jason, merging it with his own and restoring his full memories and personality. The ship crashes on Earth II and Jason X leaves the wreckage to explore a nearby forest.

=== Novels ===
In 2005, Black Flame published a novelization of Jason X. After the release of the Jason X novel, Black Flame began publishing a series of novels under the Jason X title. The Jason X series consisted of four sequels to the 2005 adaptation. The first to be published was Jason X: The Experiment, which saw the government attempting to exploit Jason's indestructibility to create an army of "super soldiers". The second novel, Planet of the Beast, follows the efforts of Dr. Bardox and his crew as they try to clone a comatose Jason and stay alive when Jason awakens. Death Moon revolves around Jason crash-landing at Moon Camp Americana, and the final novel, To the Third Power, is about the discovery of Jason underneath a prison.

=== Video games ===
After the 2017 release of Friday the 13th: The Game, it was teased that the cyborg Jason X incarnation and a map based on spaceship the Grendel would be playable in the game the following year. However, Victor Miller, screenwriter of the original Friday the 13th, exercised his legal creative rights and served a lawsuit regarding residual profits he felt he was owed by the film franchise and tie-in media that resulted from the original movie. As a result, the game halted the release of new characters and features. Although a partial version of Jason X already existed in the game's files and could be activated with a hack, the fully playable version of Jason X and the spaceship the Grendel was never released for the game.

A variation of the Jason X story with character appeared in the Friday the 13th: Killer Puzzle and as a playable character in MultiVersus.

=== Toys ===
In 2002, McFarlane Toys released an action figure based on Jason Voorhees' appearance in Jason X as part of the fifth series of its Movie Maniacs toy line. Standing approximately seven inches (17.5 cm) tall, the figure featured six points of articulation and included the character's futuristic machete as well as a display stand featuring the film's theatrical poster.

In 2006, Sideshow Collectibles released a 12-inch (30.5 cm) action figure based on Jason Voorhees' appearance in Jason X (2001), as part of its New Line House of Horrors collection. Unlike McFarlane Toys' depiction of the cybernetically enhanced "Uber Jason", the Sideshow figure portrayed the character in his original appearance from the film, featuring a removable hockey mask, tattered straitjacket remnants, and a fully articulated body with more than 30 points of articulation. The figure included a bloodied machete, leather-strapped hockey mask, neck and wrist restraints with chains, and a display stand bearing the Jason X logo. An exclusive edition, limited to 666 pieces, also included a futuristic "space machete" accessory.
