= Jason X: The Experiment =

2005 novel by Pat Cadigan

- Author: Pat Cadigan
- Language: English
- Series: Jason X
- Release number: 2
- Genre: Horror, science fiction
- Publisher: Black Flame (UK); Simon & Schuster (US)
- Publication date: 25 January 2005
- Publication place: United Kingdom
- Media type: Print (Paperback)
- Pages: 410
- ISBN: 9781844161690
- OCLC: 57063698
- Preceded by: Jason X
- Followed by: Jason X: Planet of the Beast

Jason X: The Experiment is a 2005 British science fiction horror novel written by Pat Cadigan and published by Black Flame. A tie-in to the Friday the 13th series of American horror films, it is the second in a series of five Jason X novels published by Black Flame and acts as a sequel to the 2001 film Jason X and its 2005 novelization, the latter of which was also written by Pat Cadigan and published by Black Flame.

== Plot ==
Undead cyborg Jason Voorhees, sent hurtling towards Earth II after killing almost everyone aboard the spaceship Grendel, crash-lands in Veronica Lake. The nanites in Jason's system reconstruct Jason's decimated body, energized by radiation produced by Three Mile Island, a nearby nuclear power plant being visited by Lynne Bowes, a graduate student and reporter for the Ramsey County Star. Jason goes on a rampage at the plant, butchering dozens of its staff as well as protesting environmental activists before being left stunned when his nanites are overloaded with excess energy channeled into them by the remaining personnel of Three Mile Island. The government covers up the attack on the plant and takes the survivors and the inert Jason into custody, but Lynn escapes with help from a sympathetic guard, Lieutenant Rena Sofira. The survivors, who are kept in drug-induced comas, and Jason are brought to a secret underground military complex run by Doctor Hyacinth Stein, an unethical scientist who believes she can reverse-engineer Jason's regenerative powers and nanite-enhanced physiology to produce super soldiers; the facility is infiltrated by Lynne, who has gone undercover as an intern brought in to replace one who was secretly murdered by Stein.

Jason's paralysis is maintained via constant electrocution as he is studied by Stein, whose disgruntled staff thwart her attempt to use the survivors of Three Mile Island as test subjects for her experiments with Jason. A guard and three interns, at the behest of one of Stein's suspicious subordinates, break into Stein's laboratory to acquire a sample of Jason's DNA. Jason kills the guard after being briefly unfrozen by Stein, while the interns are vivisected by Stein. After Stein tries and fails to graft the victims' tissue to Jason, a swarm of Jason's nanites, having overcome their paralysis, move from Jason's body to the corpses of the interns, which they reconstruct into a lesser copy of Jason. A recovered Jason and his doppelgänger attack Stein, who pushes a panic button, signaling the military to "sterilize" the facility before she is murdered by the two Jasons. The rest of the complex's staff, made aware of Stein's crimes and Jason's destructive capabilities through Stein's hacked files and information provided by Lynne, resuscitate everyone taken from Three Mile Island, including Sofira.

The second Jason, possessed by Stein's mind after assimilating her body, kills and devours people, while Doctor Omar Wing, a scientist whose bloodstream was contaminated by Jason's cells and nanites, morphs into a third Jason. Wing, his consciousness dwindling, forces Jason into a waste disposal rocket launched by Sofira and Master-Sergeant Black Carol before he, the Stein creature, and Corporal Daniel V. Numinen, a guard who was also infected by Jason's cells and nanites, are taken into military custody along with Sofira and Carol. Lynne and a few others who escaped Stein's facility, now fugitives wanted by the authorities, go on the run as Jason drifts through space, his presence noticed by a nigh-omnipotent alien intelligence known as the Most Ancient.

== Publication ==
Author Pat Cadigan has stated she had "a great time" writing her two Jason X novels; one of the ways she met Black Flame's required number of words was by coming up with "an explanation as to why Jason Voorhees was always killing people for having sex." In response to potential criticism over having authored Jason X novels and other media tie-ins, Cadigan declared, "When people are done going to the gallery, and they've finished all the required reading, they've studied up on everything, they take their cues from popular culture." Cadigan further commented, "They're fun and they remind me what I like about writing. And they reinforce lessons to me about narrative momentum and narrative structure. There are things that have to be different on the page rather than on the screen."

== Reception ==
Don D'Ammassa, in a review written for Chronicle, had a middling response to the novel, writing, "Cadigan manages to provide an exciting story, mostly by avoiding the clichés of the film, but her original work is obviously much better than this." Rod Lott of Bookgasm included The Experiment in his 2005 article "9 Recent Books I Just Couldn't Bring Myself to Finish, No Matter How Hard I Tried." Nat Brehmer of Bloody Disgusting felt elements like the depiction of life on Earth II and the creation of a clone of Jason Voorhees with the power to assimilate the dead were handled in an "anticlimactic" way and stated, "The slasher element is abandoned pretty early on, which is obviously not great for a Jason novel, while the environmental plot takes over." Cole Hediger, in an overview of the Jason X novels written for Bookstr, concluded, "The highly action-packed stories and militarized version of Jason make for a more science-fiction spin on the traditional Jason. That being said, for horror fans who are looking for more chills than thrills, this series may not be the fit for you. The Jason X series is written more for those looking for a harder science fiction read or action-packed novel."

William Hutson, co-founder of the band Clipping and a fan of Cadigan, has commented positively on her two Jason X novels, stating, "They are really silly and feel very tossed off, but it's kind of amazing. I really love when really good sci-fi writers write tie-in stuff."
