= The Return of Peter Grimm =

The Return of Peter Grimm is a 1911 play by David Belasco. There were two film adaptations of the play:

- The Return of Peter Grimm (1926 film), featuring Alec B. Francis
- The Return of Peter Grimm (1935 film), starring Lionel Barrymore
