= Jason X: Planet of the Beast =

2005 novel by Nancy Kilpatrick

- Author: Nancy Kilpatrick
- Language: English
- Series: Jason X
- Release number: 3
- Genre: Horror, science fiction
- Publisher: Black Flame (UK); Simon & Schuster (US)
- Publication date: 7 June 2005
- Publication place: United Kingdom
- Media type: Print (Paperback)
- Pages: 398
- ISBN: 9781844161836
- OCLC: 61217088
- Preceded by: Jason X: The Experiment
- Followed by: Jason X: Death Moon
- Website: https://nancykilpatrick.com/portfolio/jason-x-3/

Jason X: Planet of the Beast is a 2005 British science fiction horror novel written by Nancy Kilpatrick and published by Black Flame. A tie-in to the Friday the 13th series of American horror films, it is the third in a series of five Jason X novels published by Black Flame and involves undead cyborg Jason Voorhees running amok on G7, a space station orbiting Planet #666.

== Plot ==
G7, a research station orbiting Planet #666, receives distress signals from an approaching derelict vessel, Black Star 13. The crew of The Revival, a spaceship docked with G7, boards and investigates Black Star 13. The crew of Black Star 13 had found a waste disposal rocket drifting through space before being slaughtered by the vessel's only passenger, undead cyborg Jason Voorhees. Jason attacks The Revival, causing it and Black Star 13 to crash on Planet #666. Professor Claude Bardox, the lead scientist on G7, discovers Jason was aboard Black Star 13. Bardox, believing Jason's nanotechnology-enhanced physiology is the key to genetic breakthroughs, especially in the field of cloning, sets out to retrieve samples of Jason's DNA. Jason rips Bardox's prosthetic arm off and murders Bardox's assistant, Emery Peterson, and pilot, Felicity Lawrence. Despite this, Bardox is successful in bringing samples of Jason's genetic material back to G7, unaware Jason climbed aboard his shuttle to escape Planet #666. After Jason slays two of the station's personnel, Andre Desjardines and Doctor Brandi Essex Williams, Bardox, oblivious to Jason's presence on G7, knocks the rest of the station's crew out by tampering with the air and sets to work modifying the genetic samples he took from Jason. Bardox wants to create a new, perfect breed of humans with Jason's DNA, which he uses to artificially inseminate one of his subordinates, a fellow geneticist named London Jefferson. Bardox believes humanity is being held back by oppressive morality and physical frailty and also wants to impress his abusive father back on Earth II.

When the rest of G7's staff, including London, awakens, Bardox, now aware Jason is aboard the station, regroups with them and concocts a serum to immobilize Jason. The serum fails to work when injected into Jason by the station's lesbian security officer, Akako Tsunami. Jason butchers everyone on G7 besides Bardox, London, and Felicity's twin brother, Bill. Bardox, obsessed with bringing Jason and London back to Earth II for further experiments, drugs London before using a special tranquilizer to pacify Jason. Bardox has Jason murder Bill for opposing him, at which point Jason's tranquilizer wears off and he turns on Bardox. Jason murders Bardox, whose last dying act is to rouse London back to consciousness by screaming, "Save yourself!" Jason chases London through the crumbling space station and to the shuttle bay, but London escapes into space in a damaged shuttle, leaving Jason behind on what is left of G7. Jason prepares to try and jump from the station to London's shuttle but hesitates, an uncharacteristic act London chalks up to Jason being distracted by a deck breaking off of G7. As the shuttle drifts along aimlessly, London has the onboard computer run a medical diagnostic and is informed she is pregnant and the child's father is not her boyfriend, Andre. The child, a blue-eyed boy, is Jason's son and the prototype for the new race of Jason-based superhumans envisioned by Bardox.

== Publication ==
Black Flame approached author Nancy Kilpatrick about writing for the company and suggested she pen a novel based on Jason X. Black Flame did not provide Kilpatrick with a writer's bible and gave her free rein to write however she saw fit pending final approval by New Line Cinema, the owners of the Friday the 13th franchise; according to Kilpatrick, her only notable conversation with her editor while writing Planet of the Beast occurred when the editor asked, "Jason's going to kill a lot of people, right?"

Writing Planet of the Beast and the later Jason X novel To the Third Power was a personal challenge for Kilpatrick, who wanted "to see if I could do science fiction mixed with horror well." It took "maybe a week" for Kilpatrick to develop outlines for Planet of the Beast and To the Third Power after she "read what had come before" to "see where my books could fit into the series." Kilpatrick, a fan of the Friday the 13th films, noted Jason Voorhees was difficult to write, as the character "doesn't speak" and has "maybe only one emotion, rage, although we don't know that for sure." Kilpatrick left it "subject to interpretation" whether Jason "might have an emotion" in a scene near the end of Planet of the Beast. Reflecting on Jason X and its spin-off novels, Kilpatrick stated, "Jason X mixed horror with science fiction and blending genres is sometimes a problem for purist fans who don't like crossovers. Personally, I thought both the movie and the novels were a good idea, though not a sustainable one, but an experiment that I thought worked well."

== Reception ==
Nat Brehmer, in a retrospective about the Jason X spin-offs written for Bloody Disgusting, responded positively to the novel, concluding, "There's deeper characterization here, much more action, and this is probably the book that comes closest to the highs of Black Flame's other Friday the 13th and A Nightmare on Elm Street novels when they were at their best." Cole Hediger, in an overview of the Jason X novels written for Bookstr, concluded, "The highly action-packed stories and militarized version of Jason make for a more science-fiction spin on the traditional Jason. That being said, for horror fans who are looking for more chills than thrills, this series may not be the fit for you. The Jason X series is written more for those looking for a harder science fiction read or action-packed novel."
