= Jason X: To the Third Power =

2006 novel by Nancy Kilpatrick

- Author: Nancy Kilpatrick
- Language: English
- Series: Jason X
- Release number: 5
- Genre: Horror, science fiction
- Publisher: Black Flame (UK); Simon & Schuster (US)
- Publication date: 25 April 2006
- Publication place: United Kingdom
- Media type: Print (Paperback)
- Pages: 412
- ISBN: 9781844162819
- OCLC: 64097892
- Preceded by: Jason X: Death Moon
- Website: https://nancykilpatrick.com/portfolio/jason-x-5/

Jason X: To the Third Power is a 2006 British science fiction horror novel written by Nancy Kilpatrick and published by Black Flame. A tie-in to the Friday the 13th series of American horror films, it is the fifth and final installment in a series of five Jason X novels published by Black Flame and revolves around a group of scientists fighting for their lives against escaped convicts and undead cyborg Jason Voorhees.

== Plot ==
Wealthy businessman Jackson Mansfield has his protégé, Free Jefferson, hire five specialists to build a cybernetic lifeform on Elysium, one of the two moons of Earth II. The quintet consists of Brad Simpson, a cyberdesigner, and his cybertechnician girlfriend, Lynda Barnes; a pair of bioengineers named Anyar Signh and Herbert Dearman, the former of whom is blind and reliant on brain implants; and Skye Fellows, a cyber-engineer and daughter of Doctor Armando Castillo. The group's workspace on Elysium, the abandoned Moon Camp Americana, is overseen by a copy of Castillo's cavalier A.I. assistant, Major Tom. Twenty years ago, Castillo's pet project, undead cyborg Jason Voorhees, butchered him and almost everyone else in a government installation, the Military Complex, and the adjacent Moon Camp Americana, a disaster covered up by the New American Republic, which turned the Military Complex into a prison for criminals exiled from Earth II. Free and Skye become romantically involved, and, through Skye's father's secret logs, they discern Free is Jason's son, the result of an experiment conducted by Castillo's colleague, Professor Claude Bardox, on Free's deceased mother, London Jefferson, over two decades ago on a research station orbiting Planet #666.

The Sling, the experimental teleportation device being used to move Elysium's prisoners to a new penal colony on Elysium's twin moon, Thanos, malfunctions and damages the prison, freeing most of the inmates, including Juan Jimenez "JJ" Gonzales and his lover, Amanda Cartwright, survivors of Jason's rampage through Moon Camp Americana. Viper, an ambitious and conniving prisoner, and his battered pyromaniac girlfriend, Blister, overhear Free and Skye explaining to JJ they discovered Jason is sealed beneath the Military Complex, which he was brought back to by remnants of the original Major Tom's programming within both him and the Military Complex after going on a rampage at the nearby Moon City. Viper, wanting to usurp JJ's leadership of the other convicts, frees Jason for use against JJ. Jason goes on a killing spree, sparking a riot in which gangs of inmates go berserk, committing murders and gang-raping Anyar and Blister. Jason slaughters everyone besides Free and Skye.

Free and Skye complete their team's cybernetic being using programs devised by Castillo and turn it into a copy of Jason piloted by Major Tom. Free has Major Tom transmit an SOS to Mansfield, whom Free believes was manipulated by a conspiracy to get him and Skye to continue the Jason-related projects started by Bardox and Castillo. The duplicate Jason fuses with the original Jason. He then attacks Free and Skye, murdering the latter and pursuing the former to the Sling, which is passing above Moon Camp Americana. Free escapes his father, who is left clinging to the outside of the Sling as it transfers him and the prisoners aboard it to Thanos. Free is left in the decimated Moon Camp Americana to await rescue, and when he asks Major Tom about Jason's fate, the A.I. replies, "He will always survive. It is in his nature."

== Publication ==
Black Flame approached author Nancy Kilpatrick about writing for the company and suggested she pen a novel based on Jason X. Black Flame did not provide Kilpatrick with a writer's bible and gave her free rein to write however she saw fit pending final approval by New Line Cinema, the owners of the Friday the 13th franchise; it took "maybe a week" for Kilpatrick to develop outlines for To the Third Power (which had the working title Jason X: Cubed) and the earlier Jason X novel Planet of the Beast after she "read what had come before" to "see where my books could fit into the series." After completing Planet of the Beast, Kilpatrick planned on writing the proceeding Jason X novel, but Black Flame had already commissioned Alex S. Johnson to author the next Jason X book, Death Moon. Kilpatrick was disappointed over London Jefferson, the sole surviving character from Planet of the Beast, being killed off in Death Moon, as she had envisioned "a big showdown between her and Jason." After talking her editor into getting her the job writing another Jason X novel, Kilpatrick retconned Jefferson's death to set up the events of To the Third Power, which Kilpatrick noted was "a stretch" to write "because of the constraints I felt with book four in terms of how Jason is perceived and how he ends up, and also because of the destruction of my character who I wanted to re-use in another book. I had to go a different way."

Writing Planet of the Beast and To the Third Power was a personal challenge for Kilpatrick, who wanted "to see if I could do science fiction mixed with horror well." Kilpatrick, a fan of the Friday the 13th films, noted Jason Voorhees was difficult to write, as the character "doesn't speak" and has "maybe only one emotion, rage, although we don't know that for sure." Reflecting on Jason X and its spin-off novels, Kilpatrick stated, "Jason X mixed horror with science fiction and blending genres is sometimes a problem for purist fans who don't like crossovers. Personally, I thought both the movie and the novels were a good idea, though not a sustainable one, but an experiment that I thought worked well."

== Reception ==
Nat Brehmer, in a retrospective about the Jason X spin-offs written for Bloody Disgusting, responded positively to the novel, as did Louis Fowler of Bookgasm, who deemed the "fun" and "incredibly entertaining" novel "the silliest, most ridiculous book so far in the series of original horror novels featuring mass murderer Jason Voorhees in future space." Cole Hediger, in an overview of the Jason X novels written for Bookstr, concluded, "The highly action-packed stories and militarized version of Jason make for a more science-fiction spin on the traditional Jason. That being said, for horror fans who are looking for more chills than thrills, this series may not be the fit for you. The Jason X series is written more for those looking for a harder science fiction read or action-packed novel."
