= Nancy Kilpatrick =

Canadian author (1946–2025)

- Born: May 6, 1946; Canada
- Died: March 31, 2025 (aged 78)
- Occupation: Novelist
- Writing career
- Genre: Horror

Nancy Kilpatrick (May 6, 1946 – March 31, 2025) was a Canadian author who wrote stories in the genres of dark fantasy, horror, mystery, erotic horror, and gothic subculture.

Kilpatrick is most known for her vampire-themed works.

== Background ==
Kilpatrick lived and worked in Montreal. She also taught Short Story Writing at George Brown College. Kilpatrick died on March 31, 2025, at the age of 78. She was cremated; the whereabouts of her ashes are unknown.

== Awards ==
Kilpatrick was a recipient of the Arthur Ellis Award. Fangoria called her "Canada's answer to Anne Rice".

== Works ==
=== Fiction ===
- Dracul: An Eternal Love Story (1998)
- Eternal City (2003) with Michael Kilpatrick

==== The Darker Passions (under the pseudonym Amarantha Knight) ====
- Dracula (1993)
- Frankenstein (1995)
- The Fall of the House of Usher (1995)
- Dr. Jekyll & Mr. Hyde (1995)
- The Picture of Dorian Gray (1996)
- Carmilla (1997)
- The Pit and the Pendulum (1998)

==== World of Darkness ====
- As One Dead (1996) with Don Bassingthwaite

==== Power of the Blood World ====
- Child of the Night (1996)
- Near Death (1994)
- Reborn (1998)
- Bloodlover (2000)

==== Friday the 13th: Jason X ====
- Planet of the Beast (2005)
- To the Third Power (2006)

==== Thrones of Blood ====
- Revenge of the Vampir King (2017)
- Sacrifice of the Hybrid Princess (2017)
- Abduction of Two Rulers (2018)
- Savagery of the Rebel King (2019)
- Anguish of the Sapiens Queen (2020)

==== Collections ====
- Sex & the Single Vampire (1994)
- Endorphins (1997)
- The Vampire Stories of Nancy Kilpatrick (2000)
- Cold Comfort (2001)
- Contos / Vampiros (Portuguese, 2011)
- Vampyric Variations (2012)
- Thirteen Plus-1 Lovecraftian Narratives (2023)

==== Anthologies under the pseudonym Amarantha Knight ====
- Flesh Fantastic (1995)
- Love Bites (1995)
- Sex Macabre (1996)
- Seductive Spectres (1996)
- Demon Sex (1998)

==== Other Anthologies ====
- In the Shadow of the Gargoyle (1998) with Thomas S. Roche
- Graven Images: Fifteen Tales of Magic and Myth (2000) with Thomas S. Roche
- 2001 World Fantasy Convention: "Je me souviens ..." (2001) with Matthew Frederick, Margaret Grady, and Hugues Leblanc
- Outsiders: 22 All New Stories From the Edge (2005) with Nancy Holder
- Tesseracts Thirteen: Chilling Tales of the Great White North (2009) with David Morrell
- Evolve: Vampire Stories of the New Undead (2010)
- Evolve Two: Vampire Stories of the Future Undead (2011)
- Danse Macabre: Close Encounters with the Reaper (2012)
- Expiration Date (2015)
- nEvermore! (2015) with Caro Soles

=== Nonfiction ===
- The Goth Bible: A Compendium for the Darkly Inclined (2004)
