= Ginny (Friday the 13th) =

Fictional character

Ginny Field
- Friday the 13th character
- Steel portraying Ginny
- First appearance: Friday the 13th Part 2
- Created by: Ron Kurz; Phil Scuderi
- Portrayed by: Amy Steel

In-universe information
- Full name: Virginia "Ginny" Field
- Occupation: Camp counselor (former); Psychologist
- Status: Alive

Ginny Field is a fictional character in the Friday the 13th series. She first appears in Friday the 13th Part 2 (1981) as a child psychology student working as a camp counselor assistant trainer, in which she was portrayed by Amy Steel. Writer Ron Kurtz conceptualized the character, while director Steve Miner intended to utilize Ginny to carry further installments as the main protagonist. Ginny has subsequently seen representation in other media such as novels and fan labor.

Steel got the part after moving from Florida to New York to begin a career in both modeling and acting. She got called in for an audition for Ginny and described it as typecasting. Steel was asked by director Steve Miner if she would be willing to return for the sequel Friday the 13th Part III, and she declined. Ginny's confrontation with the villain Jason Voorhees (Steve Dash) and her nightmare sequence of the character have been deemed iconic. Film scholar Carol J. Clover cited Ginny among the original examples of the "final girl" theory developed in her 1992 nonfiction book Men, Women, and Chainsaws.

== Appearances ==
=== Film ===
Ginny Field (Amy Steel) made her first appearance in Friday the 13th Part 2 (1981). A child psychology major, Ginny is assisting her boyfriend Paul Holt (John Furey) in his new endeavor—running a counselor training center to train upcoming summer camp counselors. The facility is on the shores of Crystal Lake, which is infamous for the legend of Jason Voorhees (Steve Dash). Ginny believes it and deduces that Jason kills as vengeance for his mother Pamela Voorhees (Betsy Palmer). Ginny faces Jason and retreats to his makeshift hut in the woods. She discovers the shrine of Pamela Voorhees and Alice Hardy (Adrienne King) and decides to put on Pamela's deteriorating sweater—to impersonate Jason's mother. It initially works, as Jason is seeing images of Pamela talking to him whilst Ginny is speaking. However, when he notices the severed head of his true mother, Jason returns to reality and attacks Ginny. However, this is interrupted when Paul enters Jason's shack and tackles Jason. Ginny slices Jason's shoulder with a machete. Ginny has a nightmare sequence of Jason attacking her through a window. The film ends ambiguously with her being pulled away on a stretcher while she is asking about Paul's whereabouts coming in and out of sedation. In Part III (1982), Ginny appears in the films cold open flashbacking her confrontation with Jason and is later confirmed to have survived on a news report detailing her ordeal.

=== Literature ===
Ginny makes her first literary appearance in the novelization of Friday the 13th Part 3 (1982), which states that she is in "serious condition" and is suffering from "severe hysterical shock" because of her battle with Jason Voorhees. She subsequently appears as the lead protagonist in Friday the 13th Part II: A Novel, a novelization of the 1981 film Friday the 13th Part 2, which was released seven years after the film premiered in February 1988. The novel was written by Simon Hawke and based on Ron Kurz's screenplay. The aftermath of her encounter with Jason is once again referenced in the novel Friday the 13th: Carnival of Maniacs, which states that her claims of finding Jason's shack in the woods went ignored, due to the authorities doubting her sanity. Ginny is a prominent recurring character featured in the designs of the apparel company Fright-Rags. Artist Matthew Therrien featured Ginny in his "Final Girl and Cinema Survivors" digital series.

== Development ==
Steel describes filming the window sequence as her least favorite part of filming.

Victor Miller, the writer of Friday the 13th (1980), declined to write the sequel as the idea of Jason being the villain was illogical to him. Ginny, instead, was conceptualized by writer Ron Kurtz. Once Kurtz joined the production, one of his goals was to kill off the protagonist of the first film, Alice (Adrienne King). Kurtz had a misconception that King's agent was trying to push the production for more money. Kurtz created a new group of counselors and wanted them to be believable and likable characters.

Kurtz created Ginny to serve as the successor to Alice. Partial inspiration for Ginny came from numerous women Kurtz had known throughout his life that he characterized as "intelligent."

While Ginny is not in Friday the 13th Part 3 (1982), this was not intentional. Steve Miner intended for the character to return in the sequel as the protagonist and wanted the film to have a more psychological element to it—with Ginny's trauma being the focal point. One concept he worked on with writer Martin Kitrosser would have been set in a mental institution and featured Jason stalking her.

Amy Steel recollects receiving a script that features the character returning to university to finish her psychology degree and being an outcast among her peers. The screenplay features Ginny in a post-traumatic state, taking jiu-jitsu as a means of coping with her trauma. This version of the script also confirms Paul's fate (whose survival was left ambiguous in the second film)—with Jason placing his head in her dormitory. It would have featured Ginny taking proactive steps, joining supporting character Ted Bowen (Stuart Charno) as they hunt Jason down.

== Characteristics ==
Journalist Brendan Morrow (The Week) wrote that Ginny is the Friday the 13th series' most likable heroine due to her charismatic personality and her final encounter with Jason—which Morrow deems as depicting the character as being fearless and intelligent.

Eric Goldman (IGN) wrote of the franchise's lead characters that Ginny is "one of the most appealing in the entire series," attributing it to Steel being likable. Matthew Chernov (Variety) wrote that "actress Amy Steel gives a loveable performance that elevates her to the top ranks of horror movie heroines." Jeremiah Kipp (Slant) describes Steel's performance as an "enjoyably low-key and naturalistic" that resembles Jamie Lee Curtis's performance as Laurie Strode in Halloween (1978).

The Friday the 13th Part 2 script describes Ginny as an aspiring child psychologist working as a camp counselor over the summer. Steel describes liking the character as she wasn't scripted as "total bimbo" and highlights Ginny for having intelligence and confidence. Writer Jason Norman describes Ginny as being likable to the viewers and having a charismatic personality. Scholar Bruce F. Kawin notes Ginny's major in child psychology and writes her empathy toward Jason Voorhees and understanding children's emotions as attributing to her survival.

Critic Barry Keith Grant questions the morality of Ginny impersonating Pamela Voorhees as means of survival and writes that the film's ending undermines Ginny's independence. Conversely, literary critic John Kenneth Muir commended Ginny for being "resourceful" during the film's climax and writes that she upstages Alice (Adrienne King) and Laurie Strode (Jamie Lee Curtis) during her impersonation of Pamela. Writer Richard Nowell praised the character's "self-confident" entrance and "combining masculine traits with feminine attributes."

Writer J. A. Kerswell characterizes Ginny as "warm, resourceful, and plucky." Similarly, writer Jon O'Brien (Inverse) describes the character as tenacious and states that she is the franchise's "ultimate final girl." Adam Charles Hart states that Ginny is a shift in 1980's horror heroines due to her intelligence. In 2016, Paste ranked Ginny 17th on their list of The 20 Best "Final Girls" in Horror Movie History, calling her "a realistic girl of her time period who, at the same time, has the guts and resolve to face off against Jason and come out on top."

== See also ==
- Final girl
- Laurie Strode
- Nancy Thompson
