= Jason (film) =

Upcoming horror film

- Directed by: Steve Miner
- Screenplay by: David Fliegel
- Based on: Friday the 13th by Victor Miller
- Produced by: Rob Barsamian; Robbie Barsamian
- Starring: Natalie Alyn Lind; Matt Cornett; John Owen Lowe; Johnell Young; Lilia Buckingham; Summer Madison; Schuyler White
- Production companies: Horror, Inc.; Catchlight Studios
- Distributed by: Cineverse
- Release date: August 13, 2027
- Country: United States
- Language: English

Jason is an upcoming American slasher film written by David Fliegel and directed by Steve Miner. It will be the thirteenth installment in the Friday the 13th franchise, following the 2009 reboot. The film served a collaboration between Horror, Inc. and Catchlight Studios, and will be distributed by Cineverse. The film stars Natalie Alyn Lind, Matt Cornett, John Owen Lowe, Johnell Young, Lilia Buckingham, and Summer Madison as a group of young artists living in a communal art colony who are targeted by an unstoppable killer. It is the first film in the franchise not to be distributed by New Line Cinema or Paramount Pictures.

Jason is scheduled to be released on August 13, 2027.

== Cast ==
- Natalie Alyn Lind as Lauren
- Matt Cornett as Asher
- John Owen Lowe as Jake
- Johnell Young as Frank
- Lilia Buckingham as Madison
- Summer Madison as Emily
- Schuyler White as Jason Voorhees
- Selena Turner as Olive
- Matthew Sato as Lucas
- Brook Sill as Zoe
- Guillermo Díaz as Rick
- Sencere Messiah Brown as Chase
- Chase and Bryan Gael Guzman as Dylan

== Production ==
=== Development ===
==== Initial plans (2009–2021) ====
Shortly after the 2009 reboot's theatrical release, producers Brad Fuller and Andrew Form expressed an interest in producing another Friday the 13th film, citing the enjoyment they had working on the reboot. In October 2009, Warner Bros. planned to release the Friday the 13th sequel on August 13, 2010, but on December 10, 2009, the studio pulled the sequel from the planned release slot and listed its release as "TBD" (to be determined). Warner Bros. also announced that Damian Shannon and Mark Swift were penning the sequel. In April 2010, Fuller announced on his Twitter page that a sequel to the 2009 remake was no longer in the works, declaring it, "dead — not happening". In a later interview, Fuller explained that the 2009 reboot was the result of a joint effort between Paramount Pictures and New Line Cinema, as both owned portions of the Friday the 13th franchise. With financial problems, both studios were limiting the films they produced each year, opting to produce films carrying lower risks and higher rewards. Accordingly, the companies put Friday the 13th Part 2 on hold in hopes that they would move forward with this next installment when the economy bounced back. Form explained that neither studio would walk away from the sequel's production to allow the other to move forward as the primary producing house, each studio concerned that its players would look like "idiots" should the sequel perform well without its involvement. Form and Fuller also mentioned that the Friday the 13th sequel may be a 3‑D film, should it ever again be green-lit for production by the studios.

Shannon and Swift completed the script for the sequel in February 2011, according to Fuller's claim on Twitter. He was ready to begin production, but New Line was not. In June 2013, Warner Bros. relinquished its film rights to the Friday the 13th series to Paramount as part of a deal that would allow Warner to co-produce Interstellar. One week later, Derek Mears revealed that Paramount was working with Platinum Dunes to make a new installment "as fast as possible". David Bruckner was set to direct the next installment of Friday the 13th. Bruckner's original script was co-written with Ian Goldberg and Richard Naing and was a found footage film, as mandated by the studio. After altering the release date numerous times, Paramount set the film for a May 13, 2016 release date. Television writer Nick Antosca was announced to write the script in March 2015. Later in October, Paramount pushed back the film's release date to January 13, 2017. Two months later, Aaron Guzikowski was negotiating a deal to write a new script, but Bruckner, who had purportedly left the project in 2015, was no longer involved as a director. At the end of May 2016, Fuller revealed that the reboot would be an origin story for Jason, and his mother would be in the film. On August 8, Breck Eisner was in talks to direct the reboot. In September, Paramount pushed back the reboot's release date from January 13 to October 13, 2017.

The reboot's working title was reported as Friday the 13th: Part 13, Platinum Dunes was looking for someone to play a young Jason Voorhees, and production to begin in March, slated for October 13, 2017 release date. On February 6, Paramount officially canceled the project, due to the film Rings (2017) underperforming at the box office and the studio assigned the planned October release date to its then-upcoming film, Mother!. On October 10, Shannon and Swift revealed the title of their proposed sequel, Friday the 13th: Camp Blood – The Death of Jason Voorhees. The rights to the franchise reverted to New Line/Warners in 2018.

Victor Miller, who wrote the original Friday the 13th screenplay, asserted that Horror Inc. derived its current copyright to the screenplay from Miller's transfer of copyright to Horror Inc.'s predecessor-in-interest, the Manny Company. Miller sent a Notice of Termination to Horror Inc. on January 26, 2016, purportedly reclaiming his rights to the screenplay and the content contained therein through termination of the transfer of rights he had formerly made to the Manny Company. Original film producer Sean S. Cunningham claims that Miller wrote the screenplay for Friday the 13th as a work-made-for-hire for the Manny Company. Under copyright law, an employer is considered the statutory author and copyright holder if a work is made in the employee's scope of employment. If, as Cunningham contends, Miller wrote the screenplay as the Manny Company's employee, he never held a copyright to the screenplay to transfer or reclaim. A lawsuit seeking the parties' declaration of rights was filed in a federal court in Connecticut. On September 28, 2018, Miller won the rights against Cunningham. Cunningham appealed, the appeal was withdrawn due to technical reasons, and then reinstated by the deadline of April 12 the following year. The lawsuit was settled on December 29, 2021, with Miller retaining the U.S. domestic rights for the original screenplay and the character elements of the original film, including young Jason Voorhees, while Cunningham and his company Horror, Inc. retain the international rights and adult Jason Voorhees.

In October 2018, LeBron James and his production company SpringHill Entertainment (alongside Vertigo Entertainment) were in talks to co-produce the next film. A month later, screenwriter Clint Ford started writing a prequel screenplay for the franchise titled Friday the 13th: The Beginning. In July 2019, Tom McLoughlin, writer and director of Friday the 13th Part VI: Jason Lives, revealed that he authored a speculative script for a sequel film titled Jason Never Dies. McLoughlin confirmed the film would have served as a direct sequel to Jason Lives, ignoring the other films in the franchise. In 2022, McLoughlin also wrote another film with co-writer James Sweet which was a prequel to the 1980 film titled Diary of Pamela Voorhees.

==== New work as a reboot (2023–present) ====
In January 2023, writer Jeff Locker said that he, alongside Jeremy Weiss and Sean S. Cunningham, pitched a new Friday the 13th reboot, while also having a plan for an alternate direct sequel to the original film. In May 2024, Cunningham explained that a new Friday the 13th film would not be released for at least three years due to movie studios being hesitant to fund a horror movie that may not be a financial success. In July 2025, Robbie Barsamian revealed a new film and video game are in the works.

In March 2026, Sean S. Cunningham stated in an interview with TMZ that a treatment for an "old school" Friday the 13th film had been completed. He also indicated that he and franchise co-creator Victor Miller had resolved their dispute, and suggested that a potential merger between Warner Bros. and Paramount Pictures could provide significant momentum by addressing the longstanding rights issues that had hindered the project.

A thirteenth entry to the Friday the 13th franchise was revealed on November 13, 2026, following the commercial success of the television series Crystal Lake. The script was written by David Fliegel, and Steve Miner, director of Part 2 (1981) and Part III (1982), would return to the franchise to direct. The film is being produced independently by the Barsamian family at Horror, Inc. alongside Catchlight Studios, while Cineverse acquired the film to distribute it theatrically. On November 18, 2026, the film was revealed to be titled Jason.

=== Casting ===
The film was unveiled from over twelve cast members, including the titular character being portrayed by Schuyler White, who previously appeared in the 2025 short film Sweet Revenge.

=== Filming ===
Jason went in production at Atlanta, Georgia in October 2026, under the title Elysian Fields. The film completed shooting in November.

== Release ==
Jason is scheduled to be theatrically released on August 13, 2027 in the United States.
