= Alice (Friday the 13th) =

Main character in the Friday the 13th series

Alice Hardy
- Friday the 13th character
- Adrienne King as Alice in Friday the 13th (1980)
- First appearance: Friday the 13th (1980)
- Created by: Victor Miller
- Portrayed by: Adrienne King; Stephanie Rhodes

In-universe information
- Occupation: Camp counselor; Artist
- Status: Deceased (original continuity); Unknown (remake)

Alice Hardy is a fictional character in the Friday the 13th franchise. Alice first appears in Friday the 13th (1980) as an artist working as a camp counselor. She is portrayed by Adrienne King—who reprises the role in the sequel Friday the 13th Part 2 (1981) and the fan film Jason Rising (2021). Alice's creator, Victor Miller, scripted her as a flawed character, envisioning her in an affair. Once production began on the original film, budgetary constraints limited the deeper exposition intended for Alice's character.

Director Sean S. Cunningham and casting director Barry Moss wanted an established actress for the part but realized they could not afford one. An open casting call was made for the part of Alice, and King secured the role over a hundred actresses who had auditioned. King was asked by director Steve Miner if she would be willing to return for the sequel, and she agreed. Alice is prominently featured in literary works of the franchise, appearing in three novelizations adapted from films and two original novels. Additionally, Alice cameos in the Friday the 13th comics published by WildStorm, and she has been featured in merchandise and works of fan labor.

Alice's confrontation with the villain Pamela Voorhees (Betsy Palmer) and her nightmare sequence of Jason (Ari Lehman) acts as the catalyst for the rest of the events of the series. Film scholar Carol J. Clover cited Alice among the original examples of the "final girl" theory developed in her non-fiction book Men, Women, and Chainsaws (1992). The depiction of Alice's death in Friday the 13th Part 2 helped spark a new slasher film trope, in which the primary surviving character from the first film is unexpectedly killed off in the subsequent sequel.

== Appearances ==
=== Films ===
Alice Hardy (Adrienne King) first appears in the original Friday the 13th (1980) as an aspiring artist hired as a counselor at Camp Crystal Lake. After numerous killings at the camp by an unseen assailant, Alice manages to survive. Alice ultimately decapitates the villain, revealed to be Mrs. Pamela Voorhees (Betsy Palmer), driven to kill by the death by drowning of her young son, Jason (Ari Lehman), which she blamed on negligent camp counselors. The film ends with a dream sequence: Alice's nightmare of being attacked by Jason in a canoe.

Alice's second cinematic appearance comes in the sequel, Friday the 13th Part 2 (1981). Although Adrienne King received top billing for the film, suggesting Alice would be prominently featured throughout, the character is suddenly killed in the prologue by Jason (Steve Daskewisz), who is revealed to be alive, fully grown, and seeking vengeance for the death of his mother. Alice's unexpected demise became a catalyst for a trope found in later slasher films, in which the main surviving protagonist from the first film is unexpectedly killed off in the subsequent sequel.

In the franchise's 2009 reboot, which reimagined the events of the original films, Alice is portrayed by Stephanie Rhodes. She beheads the crazed Pamela Voorhees (Nana Visitor), an event witnessed by the young Jason (Caleb Guss). It is unknown what became of her after that.

=== Literature ===
Alice appears in three of the twelve novelizations based on films in the franchise and two original novels. The character made her literary debut in Simon Hawke's 1987 novelization of the original Friday the 13th (1980). Alice's story arc and backstory depict her in a love affair with two men: John in California and Steve Christy (played in the film by Peter Brouwer) at Crystal Lake. Despite liking them both and struggling to choose one, Alice wants to leave them as they do not put her above their agendas and expect her to give up her ambitions and goals. Hawke's novelization also features Alice being aware of the camp's grim history that began with the drowning of the young boy Jason.

Panel of Alice and Pamela Voorhees in Friday the 13th: Pamela's Tale #2, which shows their first encounter

Alice later appears in Hawke's 1988 novelization of Friday the 13th Part 2 (1981), which expands on her aftermath and trauma. Alice is troubled by recurring nightmares of her encounter with serial killer Mrs. Voorhees and the recollection of being pulled into the depths of the lake by her supposed drowned son Jason. Alice now resides in Crystal Lake and frequently visits the lake in an attempt to deal with her trauma, which strains her relationship with her mother who refuses to understand or listen to her. Unlike the film, the novel details how Jason manages to locate Alice's whereabouts, with the revelations that he recognizes her during one of her visits to the lake and memorizes her car. The book then follows the prologue of the film, with Jason murdering Alice in her home.

While not appearing in the film Freddy vs. Jason (2003) itself, Alice is mentioned briefly in the Stephen Hand novelization detailing her battle with Mrs. Voorhees. Alice later appeared in two original 2006 novels. Alice's first appearance in the original books, is in Christa Faust's novel Friday the 13th: The Jason Strain when Jason becomes enraged when he hallucinates a soldier taking the form of Alice in the process of killing his mother again. The second of the original books is in Stephen Hand's Friday the 13th: Carnival of Maniacs, which adapts the ending of the 1980 film as its prologue.

Alice made her debut in comics in two WildStorm publications, both being cameo appearances adapted from scenes of the first film. The sixth and final issue of WildStorm's Friday the 13th, depicts a flashback of a young Jason pulling her into the lake. The second issue of the comic miniseries Friday the 13th: Pamela's Tale depicts Alice's first encounter with Mrs. Voorhees.

== Development ==
=== Conception ===
Writer Victor Miller was told to watch John Carpenter's Halloween (1978) and base a screenplay upon it. Miller was supposed to build Alice upon the characteristics set forth by virginal heroine Laurie Strode (Jamie Lee Curtis) in Carpenter's film, particularly a sense of "resourcefulness and intelligence." Miller, however, did not find it necessary for Alice to be virginal and wanted to depict her as a less sympathetic character.

Miller's early drafts provide Alice with a backstory, with her having an affair with a married man on the West Coast, which is why her relationship with Steve Christy is deteriorating, and she wants to leave the camp. Miller's most conscious efforts with the character were to write her as an outsider, someone who did not fit in with the rest of the counselors. Once filming began, however, director Sean S. Cunningham did not explore Alice's story arc in-depth due to budget and time constraints.

Miller turned down writing the second film, and Ron Kurtz took on writing duties. Kurtz's script kills Alice off in the opening of the film. Director Steve Miner found Alice to be pivotal to the plot as she is the heroine of the first film and that she needed to have a dramatic death as "Part 2 was Jason's film." Due to budgetary constraints again, the film only has Alice stalked and killed by an unseen assailant all in her apartment. King interprets Alice's death scene as a "nightmare within a nightmare" and that the viewer never really saw Alice's body afterward.

=== Casting ===
In 1979, there was an open casting call for the role of Alice as a publicity stunt to get people interested in the production. The audition process for Alice took an entire summer. Cunningham and casting director Barry Moss were initially looking for a big-name actress. At some point, they were pushing for Sally Field to play the part. They began to look for new actresses upon realizing that they could not afford someone established.

King was a friend of a woman who worked in an office alongside Moss. After several other actresses in New York auditioned, they brought King in to audition. When she arrived, there were hundreds of people in the hallway waiting to audition for Alice. King recollects not having to even read for a scene but rather introduce herself and scream. After meeting her, Cunningham remarked, "You sneaky guys! You saved the best one for last!" Cunningham described her as embodying the "vulnerable, girl-next-door type" and having a natural appeal that he wanted for the Alice character. In late August of that year, King received a letter making her casting official.

Ron Kurtz brought Alice back for Steve Miner's sequel Friday the 13th Part 2 (1981), purposefully in a smaller capacity. Both Kurtz and Miner believed King and her agent were trying to push the production for more money. However, in reality, King suffered an aggressive stalker after the first film and wanted to return as long as her character was handled properly. King did not receive a script but recalls having lunch with Miner and his assistant Denise Pinkley, and they asked if she would be willing to return. She agreed as she felt it was something she owed the filmmakers due to the first film's success.

Alice's scenes for Part 2 were shot over a weekend in Connecticut at the end of November 1980. Miner recalls having fun shooting Alice's sequences, being particular about King's movement as the character. Conversely, King described returning as Alice for this film to be unenjoyable due to a mundane set, "It was just me, a head in the refrigerator and someone outside, ready to throw a black cat at me through the window." Filming Alice's death with the ice pick, King was injured when the prop failed to retract.

=== Characterization ===
Film critic Terry Lawson describes the character's depiction in Friday the 13th (1980) as an "all-American" girl, attributing to her being "destined to be the last one alive." Ted Serrill (Home News Tribune) describes Alice's placement as the heroine feeling arbitrary. Mike Hughes (The Journal News) wrote that Adrienne King "projects a combination of intelligence and fragility," in Alice. Both Hughes and Ron Cowan (Statesman Journal) criticize the character's trait of knocking the villain unconscious and running away without killing her, the latter describing Alice as "a rather panicky young woman." Alice's creator, writer Victor Miller, acknowledges this characteristic of the character in an op-ed, writing, "Without spoiling the ending for you, I'll say that our heroine becomes locked in a terminal struggle with the villain. Time and time again the heroine cannot bring herself to kill the villain."

King states that she based her portrayal on traditional horror movie characters and described Alice as a "great scream queen heroine." She also expresses regret that, due to the nature of horror movies, audiences never got to see Alice's relationship with Steve fleshed out, or what could have happened between her and fellow counselor, Bill (Harry Crosby). King attests that the script didn't provide her with a lot of material to work with in preparing for Alice. King, an artist in real life, incorporated this aspect of herself into Alice and often spent her time sketching on set. Friday the 13th: The Final Chapter (1984) director Joseph Zito praised the natural performance of King, "...the way Adrienne King played the lead—you really felt for her and cared for her."

Alice has garnered her comparisons to other genre heroines such as Laurie Strode, Ellen Ripley (Sigourney Weaver), Nancy Thompson (Heather Langenkamp), and Sidney Prescott (Neve Campbell). Writer Jessica Robinson attributes Alice's survival to her innocence and resourcefulness. Bruce F. Kawin writes that, unlike other heroines of the time, Alice isn't saved by a man in the ending, thus having a more profound impact on future slasher films. Alice is one of the original examples of the "final girl" theory by Carol J. Clover in her non-fiction book Men, Women, and Chainsaws (1992).

== In popular culture ==
King on the set of a fan film

Alice is featured in American popular culture. Merchandise based upon the character has been released periodically years after her debut. McFarlane Toys released a figure depicting Alice being pulled into the lake by a young Jason. NECA released a figure that included Alice's decayed corpse from Part 2 as a part of the model of Jason's shrine to his mother. Illustrator Erin Ellis released a paper doll of Alice.

Alice is a featured character on the alternate cover of the first issue of Famous Monsters of Filmland. Artist Matthew Therrien released a digital piece of Alice alongside Pamela Voorhees for his "Final Girls & Cinema Survivors" series. The character served as inspiration for writer Grady Hendrix's idea for his novel The Final Girl Support Group (2021) as her death in Part 2 bothered him since he was a child, and he wanted to give her a happy ending. His character of Adrienne, named after Adrienne King, reflects Alice's story.

Alice is brought back in fan labor of the franchise. While non-canonical, Alice is a supporting character in James Sweet's fan film Jason Rising (2021) as an artist suffering from post-traumatic stress disorder and wanting vengeance against the Voorhees family. King reprises her role.

== Works cited ==
- Bracken, Peter (2006). Crystal Lake Memories: The Complete History of Friday the 13th. Titan Books. ISBN 978-1-845-76343-5.
- Crane, Jonathan (September 19, 1994). Terror and Everyday Life. Sage Publishing. ISBN 978-0-803-95849-4.
- Ellis, Erin (2013). Great Horror Movie Villains Paper Dolls: Psychos, Slashers and Their Unlucky Victims!. Courier Corporation. ISBN 978-0486498867.
- Faust, Christa (January 31, 2006). Friday the 13th: The Jason Strain. Black Flame. p. 284. ISBN 1-84416-320-2.
- Grove, David (February 2005). Making Friday the 13th: The Legend of Camp Blood. United Kingdom: FAB Press. p. 36. ISBN 1-903254-31-0.
- Hand, Stephen (2003). Freddy vs. Jason. Black Flame. ISBN 1-84416-059-9.
- Hand, Stephen (2006). Friday the 13th: Carnival of Maniacs. Nottingham: Black Flame. ISBN 978-1-84416-380-9.
- Harper, Jim (2004). Legacy of Blood. Critical Vision. ISBN 978-1-900-48639-2.
- Hawke, Simon (1987). Friday the 13th. New York: Signet. ISBN 978-0-451-15089-9.
- Hawke, Simon (1988). Friday the 13th Part 2. New York: Signet. ISBN 978-0-451-15337-1.
- Jowett, Lorna (2018). Joss Whedon Vs. the Horror Tradition, The Production of Genre in Buffy and Beyond. Bloomsbury Publishing. ISBN 978-1-786-73541-6.
- Kawin, Bruce (2012). Horror and the Horror Film. Anthem Press. ISBN 978-0857284495.
- Knight, Gladys (2010). Female Action Heroes: A Guide to Women in Comics, Video Games, Film, and Television. ABC-CLIO. ISBN 978-0313376122.
- Norman, Jason (2014). Welcome to Our Nightmares. McFarland. ISBN 978-1-476-61724-4.
- Robinson, Jessica (2012). Life Lessons from Slasher Films. Scarecrow Press. ISBN 978-0810885028.
