= Crystal Lake (TV series) =

2026 American slasher series

- Genre: Drama; Psychological thriller; Slasher
- Based on: Friday the 13th by Victor Miller
- Developed by: Brad Caleb Kane
- Showrunner: Brad Caleb Kane
- Starring: Linda Cardellini; William Catlett; Gwendolyn Sundstrom; Cameron Scoggins; Devin Kessler
- Theme music composer: Harry Manfredini
- Composer: Giosuè Greco
- Country of origin: United States
- Original language: English
- No. of seasons: 1
- No. of episodes: 8

Production
- Executive producers: Brad Caleb Kane; Marc Toberoff; Victor Miller; Robert M. Barsamian; Robert P. Barsamian; Stuart Manashil; Tyson Bidner; Michael Lennox; Roy Lee
- Running time: 43–56 minutes
- Production company: A24

Original release
- Network: Peacock
- Release: October 15, 2026

Crystal Lake is an American slasher television series developed by Brad Caleb Kane that serves as the prequel to the Friday the 13th franchise, set seven years before the original film, in 1972. Stars Linda Cardellini in the leading role of Pamela Voorhees, with Callum Vinson as a young Jason Voorhees, William Catlett, Gwendolyn Sundstrom, Cameron Scoggins, and Devin Kessler also starring.

Produced by A24, the series premiered on Peacock on October 15, 2026. It received generally positive reviews from critics. The series' success led to a new film installment in the franchise titled, Jason (2027).

== Cast and characters ==
=== Main ===
- Linda Cardellini as Pamela Voorhees, Jason's mother
- William Catlett as Levon "Lee" Brooks, the Crystal Lake Chief of Police
- Gwendolyn Sundstrom as Grace Snell, a young girl that Jason and later Pamela befriend
- Cameron Scoggins as Ronald "Dorf" Dorfman, Levon's partner in the Crystal Lake Police Department
- Devin Kessler as Briana Brooks, a journalist for New York-based The Star-Ledger and Levon's younger sister

=== Recurring ===
- Callum Vinson as Jason Voorhees, Pamela's and Elias' son
  - Kaiden Cullen and Theo Lonsdale as a 4-year old Jason in the episode "Friday...".
  - Jonathan Tison as an adult Jason in the episode "The Final Chapter"
- Nick Cordileone as Ralph, a war veteran living as a recluse in the woods
- Neal Huff as Hamish, a war veteran and Dorf's father
- Joy Suprano as Rita, a friend of Pamela
- Daniel Stewart Sherman as Enos, a truck driver and regular patron at Hartung's
- William Hill as Gus, a friend of Enos
- Bernadette Quigley as Trudy, the owner of the Hartung's diner
- Danielle Kotch as Claudette, a camp counsellor and Barry's girlfriend
- Phoenix Parnevik as Barry, a camp counsellor and Claudette's boyfriend
- Brian J. Carter as John Christy, a camp operator
- Nancy Nagrant as Kay Christy, a camp operator

=== Guest ===
- Dan Thompson as Steve Christy, John and Kay's son
- Blair Sams as Nora, a friend of Pamela
- Nathan Darrow as Wilhelm, a life coach
- Tonya Glanz as Valerie Snell, Grace's mother
- Jason Fuchs as Nate, Briana's colleague at the The Star-Ledger
- Manon Gage as Mary Ann "Harmony" Sacramoni, a member of the hippie group who mentors Grace
- Albert DiCesare as Space Ghost, the leader of a hippie group
- Oona Roche as Willow, a member of the hippie group
- Drew Scheid as Shutterbug, a member of the hippie group and an amateur photographer
- Philip Themio Stoddard as Gabe, a member of the hippie group and Rhiannon's boyfriend
- April Consalo as Rhiannon, a member of the hippie group and Gabe's girlfriend
- Lark White as Stella Blue, a member of the hippie group
- Nate Kelderman as Plato, a member of the hippie group
- Hamish Linklater as Elias Wittering, Pamela's estranged husband and Jason's father
- Christopher Denham as Dr. Landau, a former physician at Bellflower Chemical
- Jeffrey Bean as Dr. Valentine, a physician at Bellflower Chemical
- Olivia Macklin as Trish, a participant in the Bellflower Project Argonaut clinical trials
- Kate Micucci as Miss Parsons, a nurse

== Episodes ==
| No. | Title | Directed by | Written by | Original release date |
|---|---|---|---|---|
| 1 | "Camp Crystal" | Michael Lennox | Story by : Bryan Fuller and Brad Caleb Kane; Teleplay by : Brad Caleb Kane | October 15, 2026 |
In 1971, Pamela Voorhees works as a cook at Camp Crystal Lake, where her son Jason, who has hydrocephalus and suffers seizures, is bullied by the other campers. His only friend is Grace Snell. While counselors Barry and Claudette sneak off to have sex, Jason gets into trouble in deep water and disappears beneath the surface; his body is never found. One year later, Pamela still keeps watch over the lake. Police chief Levon Brooks persuades her to attend the town's Founder's Day fair, but she breaks down at the sight of children swimming. At home, two men posing as state detectives tell her Jason's body has been found, then try to sedate her with a syringe. One of the men threatens to tell the town what she really is. Pamela kills both, one with a pair of scissors and the other with a machete she had bought for Jason. Pamela calls a woman named Nora to warn her that they have been found, then coats the bodies in bait and drags them to a bear's den, where the bear eats them.
| 2 | "Part 2" | Michael Lennox | Brad Caleb Kane | October 15, 2026 |
Nora warns Pamela that the company she fled hires subcontractors and that more trouble may follow. Pamela makes amends with Levon and joins him bowling, where Rita, who once had a stillbirth, invites her to an out-of-town self-help seminar run by a guru named Wilhelm. Wilhelm goads Pamela into singing, uncovering her past as a singer, and accuses her of living behind a mask. That night they nearly sleep together before she bites him and pulls away. The next day, his regression exercise brings back fragmented memories of scientists and experiments, and she flees. She returns with her bowling ball to attack him, but a seminar attendee whose wife left him beats Wilhelm with a baseball bat first. In Crystal Lake, two teenagers find a human pelvis in the woods bearing apparent bear marks. At Briana's urging, Levon examines it himself and finds a broken scissor blade inside. Grace crashes a senior party and threatens to reveal what Claudette and Barry were doing when Jason drowned. Later, something in the woods frightens Barry, and Grace's discarded shoes are thrown through the couple's car window.
| 3 | "Part III" | Michael Lennox | Story by : Jen Silverman & Pia Wilson; Teleplay by : Jen Silverman | October 15, 2026 |
In a flashback, Jason and Grace claim an abandoned house in the woods as their secret fortress. In the present, Levon helps Pamela pack up Jason's belongings; they kiss, but she pulls back. Ralph, who is haunted by his service in Vietnam, finds clothing stolen from his property and large human footprints nearby. Levon traces an abandoned rental car with blood in its trunk to a man using the false name Carl Egan and asks Briana to look into Carl's employer. Grace is suspended after fighting Claudette. Visiting Grace at home, Pamela sees cigarette burns on her hands and concludes that Grace's mother, Valerie, is abusing her. A group of townsmen defy Levon and go on a bear hunt, during which Enos is accidentally shot by a friend; before passing out, he sees a giant figure standing over him. Pamela confronts Valerie at the restaurant where she works, smashes her face with a meat tenderizer, and watches her die in a deep fryer before burning the restaurant down. It is revealed that Grace's burns are self-inflicted.
| 4 | "A New Beginning" | Celine Held and Logan George | Evan Endicott & Josh Stoddard | October 15, 2026 |
Pamela sleeps with Levon on the night of the fire, and Grace is placed with the Christys. Willow, a young woman looking for her friends from a hippie commune, steps into one of Ralph's traps and is abducted. Pamela gets her job back as camp cook and finds Grace befriending Harmony, the leader of the hippie group working at the camp. Levon and Dorf find a second body in a bear den beside one of Ralph's bootprints and realize the deaths were not bear attacks. Briana links Carl's employer to Bellflower Chemical through court filings, and a former colleague of Levon's identifies Carl as an ex-soldier turned private contractor, while refusing further help over a corruption case that drove Levon out of the city. On a double date with Rita and Dorf, Pamela overhears that police now suspect a human killer and leaves abruptly. Dorf searches Ralph's property and finds Willow's body hanging in his slaughterhouse. Pamela comes across Grace at a séance with Harmony's group, where Harmony, seemingly possessed by Valerie, calls Pamela a monster and attacks her. Grace tells Pamela to stay away from her.
| 5 | "The New Blood" | Celine Held and Logan George | Karl Taro Greenfeld | October 15, 2026 |
Dorf arrests Ralph for Willow's murder, though Levon doubts his guilt, while Dorf's father Hamish urges him to go over Levon's head and charge Ralph. Harmony's group plans to return to their commune, and Grace begs to go with them. The camp opens for the summer. After learning that Barry has slept with Harmony, Claudette tearfully confesses to Pamela what she and Barry were doing when Jason drowned. Briana tracks down Dr. Landau, a physician named in lawsuits against Bellflower, who warns her to drop the story. At a drug-fueled memorial for Willow, Grace takes a large dose of LSD after Harmony leaves with Barry, wanders into the woods, and sees Jason. Barry reconciles with Claudette, and the two go to the boathouse to have sex, where Grace attacks them. Pamela arrives to find Grace in a state of shock, finishes off Claudette, and promises to take care of Grace.
| 6 | "Kill Them, Mommy" | Celine Held and Logan George | Brad Caleb Kane & Evan Endicott & Josh Stoddard | October 15, 2026 |
Pamela convinces Grace that she did not kill Barry and Claudette. Urged on by a vision of Jason, Pamela dumps the bodies near the hippies' campsite and kills the group one by one, though Harmony escapes. Pamela finds one fleeing member already killed with a machete and suspects Jason did it to protect Grace. State police take over the case, believing the group turned on one another after taking bad drugs, and shut Levon out by citing his past. Landau sends Briana documents about Pamela but is killed before he can meet her. Elias, who claims to be behind a program called Project Argonaut, confronts Briana instead, and she escapes his men. Pamela coaches a hospitalized Grace on what to tell police. The newly released Ralph tells Pamela that whatever lives in the woods must be killed, and she admits she believes it is Jason. At the fortress, an unseen Jason destroys the supplies she brings him. Levon and Briana confront Pamela at her home with the Bellflower files and the scissor blade, and she prepares to tell them the truth.
| 7 | "Friday..." | Quyen Tran | Laura Marks | October 15, 2026 |
Years earlier, Pamela, then a singer, begins bleeding during a television performance and is told she has lost her pregnancy. Her boyfriend Elias takes her to his employer Bellflower's medical facility in Houston, where Dr. Valentine says the baby can be saved through a clinical trial. Elias proposes, and the couple moves into company housing. Trish, another trial participant, delivers a stillborn baby and then kills herself in front of Pamela, sending her into early labor. Jason is born with deformities, and Elias earns a promotion by agreeing to manage Pamela for the company. When infant Jason drowns in the bath while Pamela sleeps, he revives, and Bellflower places Pamela on mood stabilizers. As Jason grows older and sicker, Pamela learns from his drawings that he is being experimented on. Bellflower takes custody of Jason after he begins bleeding at his birthday party, and Elias threatens to divorce her. During a company event where Elias celebrates the success of Project Argonaut, an effort to create humans who can survive nuclear fallout, Pamela steals Landau's keys, finds a room full of dead babies and children who are having similar experiments performed on them, finds and kills Dr. Valentine who is holding Jason, and escapes with her son with Nora's help.
| 8 | "The Final Chapter" | Quyen Tran | Story by : Brad Caleb Kane & Arthur Imperatore; Teleplay by : Brad Caleb Kane | October 15, 2026 |
Pamela tells Levon and Briana about Bellflower, and Levon takes her to the police station, promising to find her a lawyer. Elias arrives in town and learns of Jason's death and Pamela's address from Enos. At the station, Levon admits he once took dirty money on a case and refuses Pamela's plea to run away with her. Elias and his men arrive, and Pamela pretends to leave with him before stabbing him. Dorf arrives and strikes one of the men with a throwing star, setting off a gunfight in which Levon is shot and Elias escapes into the woods with Pamela. There they encounter Jason, now a fully grown man wearing a sack over his head, who crushes Elias's skull. Jason begins to strangle Pamela, but her pleas of love stir his memories of their life together and he lets her go. Ralph shoots at Jason, who vanishes into the trees, and a laughing Pamela tells Ralph that the woods now belong to her and Jason. Later, Steve Christy tells a group gathered around a campfire the legend of Jason's ghost as someone watches them from the woods.

== Production ==
=== Conception ===
In September 2003, during a panel session at the Maniafest convention, Sean S. Cunningham spoke about the possibility of bringing Friday the 13th to television, with the series focusing on a group of teenagers living in the Crystal Lake area. In October 2005, Cunningham discussed the potential series further. He explained that the idea was to call the series Crystal Lake Chronicles, and "set [it] in a town with all this Jason history". The series would focus more on "coming-of-age issues", in a similar style to Buffy the Vampire Slayer, Dawson's Creek, and Smallville, with Jason Voorhees as more of a recurring "background" character.

In April 2014, Emmett/Furla/Oasis Films and Crystal Lake Entertainment planned to produce an hour-long Friday the 13th television series. The series was intended to focus on a group of characters at Crystal Lake, who have to deal with the return of Jason Voorhees, as well as discover new information about him and his family. The series was being developed by the CW as of August 2015. Steve Mitchell and Craig Van Sickle were hired to write the plot, while Sean S. Cunningham, Randall Emmett, George Furla and Mark Canton were to be the executive producers, but, one year later, the network decided to not move forward with the series. CW president Mark Pedowitz explained: "We had better pilots. The bottom line is we felt we had stronger things to go with, and we didn't go forward with it. It was well-written, it was darker than we wanted it to be, and we didn't believe it had sustainability... We didn't believe that it was a sustainable script, a sustainable series. It was a very good pilot, but not a sustainable series."

=== Development ===
In October 2022, a Friday the 13th prequel series titled Crystal Lake was announced to be in development by A24 with Bryan Fuller as showrunner. It was to be executive produced by Fuller, Victor Miller, Marc Toberoff and Rob Barsamian. The following month, Fuller revealed to Fangoria that they had complete creative freedom of the franchise under the streaming rights. He further explained, "As a streaming series, we have the rights to do everything underneath the Friday the 13th umbrella. The movie rights are a completely different thing. They are tied up at New Line and are super, super messy and probably won't be untangled anytime soon, but as far as us chickens in the television industry, uh, roost, we have access to anything and everything that Friday the 13th has done up until this point." One episode written by Fuller was described as "an hour-long chase" on a frozen Crystal Lake.

Writing for the series was slated to begin in late January 2023, with Kevin Williamson set to write an episode for the first season. It was reported that Adrienne King had been cast in a recurring undisclosed role. She previously portrayed Alice Hardy in the 1980 original film and the 1981 sequel, although ultimately King would not appear in the finished show. Production was halted in May 2023 due to the 2023 Writers Guild of America strike. In May 2024, it was revealed that Fuller had been fired from the series after A24 elected to take the series in a different direction. Williamson also departed the project. At one point in production, Charlize Theron was considered as the role of Jason's mother, Pamela Voorhees. Filming was set to begin in August 2024, with a production budget of $10 million per episode for an eight episode season. Vincenzo Natali and Kimberly Peirce were set to direct episodes.

=== Production ===
Nick Antosca was in talks to join as showrunner. In August 2024, it was announced that Brad Caleb Kane would serve as the series' new showrunner. Michael Lennox directed the first through third episodes, Celine Held and Logan George directed the fourth through sixth, and Quyen Tran helmed the seventh and eighth.

In March 2025, Linda Cardellini was cast as Pamela Voorhees. In April 2025, Kane posted an image of an episode's production script and said that the series' production offices had opened, and by May, interior sets were under construction. William Catlett was cast as Levon Brooks. In June 2025, Devin Kessler, Cameron Scoggins, and Gwendolyn Sundstrom were added to the main cast. Callum Vinson plays a young Jason Voorhees, Pamela's son, in a recurring guest role.

Under the shooting title Mama's Boy, principal photography began in New Jersey on June 20, 2025. Scenes were shot in Jersey City and West Milford. Filming of interior and exterior shots at the Rutt's Hut in Clifton took place from August 1 to 8. Production later moved to Camp No-Be-Bo-Sco in Blairstown, the same camp location and town used in the 1980 original film, Friday the 13th. Filming concluded in October 2025. Other locations were scattered over five counties in New Jersey: Camp Tamarack, the National Newark Building, Cinelease-Caven Point Studio, Lewis Morris Park, Christos M. Cotsakos College of Business and the Blairstown Museum.

In April 2026, Kane shared on Instagram that all eight episodes were in the final stages of post-production, completing audio mixing.

=== Music ===
Crystal Lake was composed by Italian musician Giosuè Greco who scored the series with veteran series composer Harry Manfredini who performed both the series' main title theme and end credits theme only in the series finale episode. The series soundtrack album titled Camp Songs, was available on A24 Music on October 30, 2026.

== Release ==
Crystal Lake premiered on Peacock in the United States with all episodes on October 15, 2026. It was released simultaneously on HBO Max in Europe, Africa and the Middle East, on Crave in Canada, and on October 19 on Sky Atlantic and Now in the United Kingdom and Ireland. Following its release, the series debuted at number 1 in the U.S. and Canada, maintaining its number 1 spot for two consecutive weeks in Canada.

The series had preview screenings in the Primetime program in September at the 2026 Toronto International Film Festival and at the New York Comic Con and Beyond Fest in October.

== Reception ==
On the review aggregator website Rotten Tomatoes, 77% of 77 critics' reviews are positive, with an average rating of 6.6/10. The website's consensus reads: "Linda Cardellini plays the perfect mom who can do no wrong in this slasher prequel that lives up to the best and worst of its franchise's ilk, but since mother knows best, Crystal Lake is a campy, gory, good time." Metacritic, which uses a weighted average, assigned a score of 61 out of 100 based on 22 critics, indicating "generally favorable" reviews.

William Goodman of TheWrap praised Cardellini's performance in Crystal Lake, describing her as the strongest element of the Friday the 13th prequel. Goodman highlighted Cardellini's portrayal of Pamela Voorhees and the series' attempts to expand the franchise's mythology, while criticizing its difficulty balancing established canon with an original story. Peter Gray of The AU Review praised Crystal Lake as an ambitious and entertaining revival of the Friday the 13th franchise.

Benjamin Lee of The Guardian criticized the series for unnecessarily expanding the straightforward premise of Friday the 13th, describing the series as an overcomplicated and misguided attempt to add backstory to the franchise. He also criticized its excessive subplots and inconsistent tone, arguing that the story struggled to justify its eight-episode format, despite Cardellini's performance and the graphic violence.

== Novelization ==
A novelization of the series, written by Tim Waggoner, was published by A24 on October 15, 2026.

== See also ==
- Friday the 13th: The Series, a 1987 television series sharing the same title as the film franchise
