= Rock, Paper, Scissors (2017 film) =

2017 psychological horror film

- Film poster
- Directed by: Tom Holland
- Screenplay by: Kerry Fleming; Victor Miller
- Produced by: Kerry Fleming; Victor Miller; Amy Williams; Tom Holland
- Starring: Luke Macfarlane; Jennifer Titus
- Cinematography: Yash Bhatt
- Edited by: Ed Marx
- Music by: Harry Manfredini
- Production companies: Fuel 1 RPD Entertainment
- Distributed by: Grindstone Entertainment Group (United States); Vertical Entertainment (International)
- Release dates: October 21, 2017 (Nightmares Film Festival); July 23, 2019
- Country: United States
- Language: English

Rock, Paper, Scissors (also known as Rock Paper Dead) is a 2017 American psychological horror film directed by Tom Holland, and written by Kerry Fleming and Victor Miller.

== Synopsis ==
Serial killer Peter "the Doll Maker" Harris is considered cured and is released from a state hospital for the criminally insane. He returns to his ancestral family home, where he is haunted by childhood memories and ghostly visitations from the past victims. Ashley, a beautiful writer who wants to write a book about him, enters his life, rekindling old desires.

== Cast ==
- Luke Macfarlane as Peter Harris
- Jennifer Titus as Ashley Grant
- Michael Madsen as Doyle Dechert
- Tatum O'Neal as Dr. Evelyn Bauer
- Anna Margaret as Zoe Palmer
- John Dugan as Uncle Charles
- Gabrielle Stone as Barbara
- Courtlyn Cannan as Angela Grant
- Nicole Pierce as Detective Walker
- Kerry Fleming as Detective Flynn
- Quinton Aaron as Joe
- Ari Lehman as Jason
- Sam Puefua as Michael
- Maureen McCormick as Nurse Ruland
- Shanda Renee as Nurse Collins
- Najarra Townsend as Harmony
- Max Madsen as Kris

== Promotion and release ==
In 2016 it was announced that Holland would be directing the film Rock Paper Dead, to be written by Friday the 13th screenwriter Victor Miller. A trailer for the film was released on March 2, 2017. On October 21, 2017, the film premiered at Nightmares Film Festival in Columbus, Ohio, where it won Best Screenplay Feature. The film was set for wide release in 2018, but this date was postponed. In May 2019 it was announced that the film would be released under the title Rock, Paper, Scissors on DVD/Blu-ray as well as on VOD on July 23, 2019.
