= Ari Lehman =

American actor (born 1965)

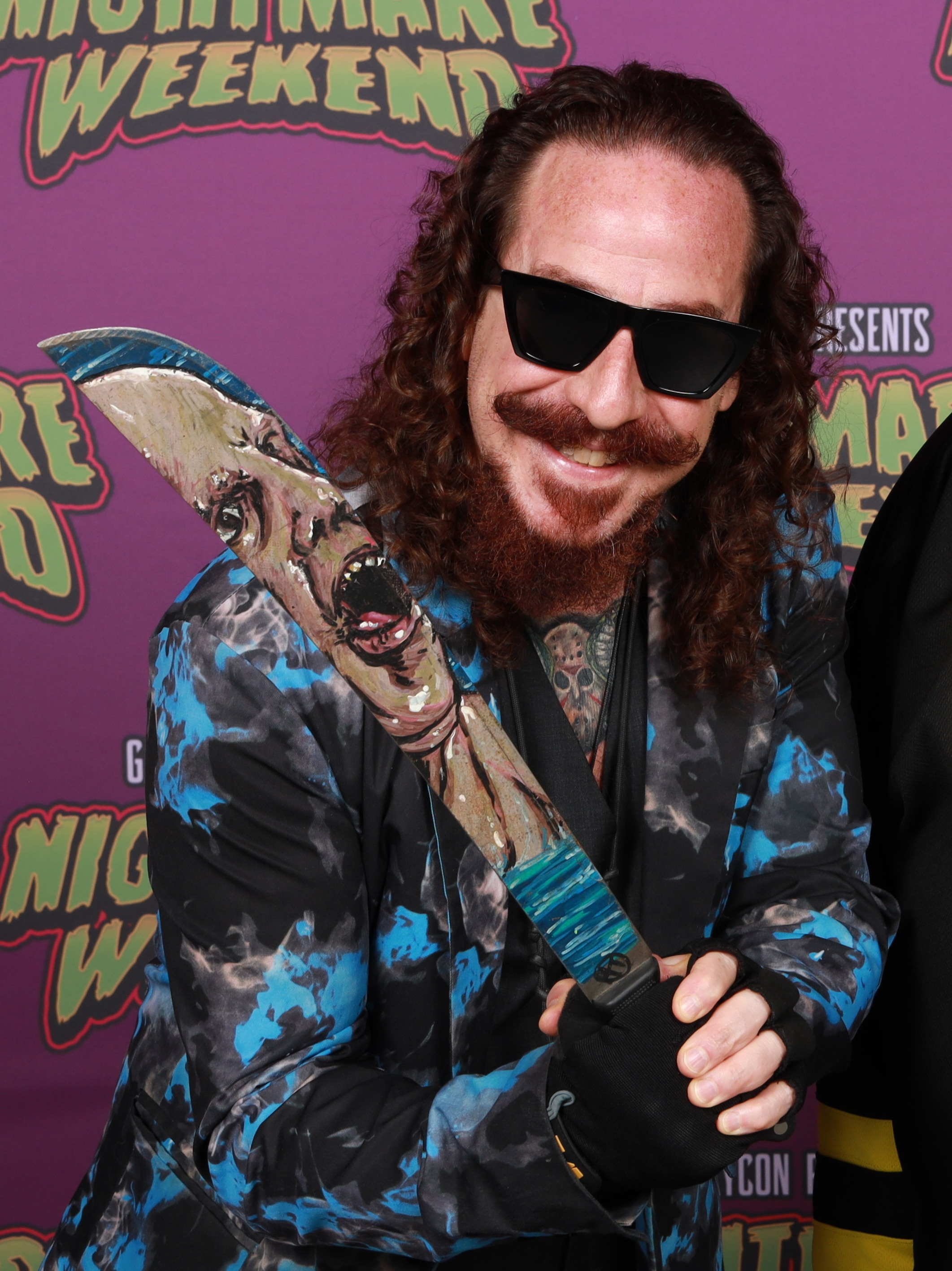
- Lehman in 2025
- Born: May 2, 1965 (age 61); Brooklyn, New York City, New York, United States
- Occupations: Actor, musician
- Years active: 1978–present
- Notable work: Jason Voorhees in Friday the 13th (1980)

Ari Lehman (born May 2, 1965) is an American performing artist, composer and actor. He is known for playing the child Jason Voorhees in the Paramount horror film Friday the 13th, becoming the first actor to portray the horror film icon. As of 2018, Lehman performs in a punk rock/heavy metal band, First Jason.

== Biography ==
A native New Yorker, Ari Lehman grew up in Westport, Connecticut, where he trained in Classical Music and Jazz Piano. Lehman was presented with an All-State Award for Excellence in Jazz Piano and a scholarship to Berklee School of Music by jazz educator, Dr. Billy Taylor.

Lehman heard about an audition being held in Westport for the movie, "Manny's Orphans", about a group of inner-city orphans who play soccer, directed by Sean S. Cunningham. Lehman snuck into the audition and landed the role of "Roger". This role led to Lehman getting the call to play Jason Voorhees in Friday the 13th from Sean S. Cunningham. "For his audition Lehman was asked one key question by the director, ‘Can you swim?’"

After the release of Friday the 13th, Lehman returned to New York City, where he enrolled at New York University and concentrated on Big Band Orchestration and Jazz Piano, "where he studied with the likes of Vladimir Shafranov". Lehman's career led him to become a keyboardist for artists of Reggae and African music of the time, with whom he toured throughout the US, Europe and West Africa, and recorded with at Tuff Gong Records and Interscope Records.

Lehman went on to form his own world rock and reggae band Ari Ben Moses Band, and gained acclaim when, upon moving to Chicago in late 2002, he was contacted by horror fans who invited him to attend an East Coast horror convention. Lehman then created First Jason, a punk metal band specifically for horror fans, especially the fans of Jason Voorhees and Friday the 13th.

== Film career ==
Lehman made his film debut in Sean S. Cunningham's film Manny's Orphans. He then played the role of a child Jason Voorhees in Friday the 13th, appearing in Pamela Voorhees's flashback and Alice Hardy's dream – the final scene of the horror film.

Lehman also appears in archive footage, uncredited, in Friday the 13th Part 2 (1981) and Friday the 13th: The Final Chapter (1984).

== Music career ==
In 2004, Lehman formed his punk metal band whose name, First Jason, is based upon his role as Jason Voorhees. First Jason has independently released two albums: Jason is Watching! (2009), with Chuck Lescewicz "Nefarious" from Chicago death metal band Macabre playing bass, and Amit Shamir "Cleaver" from New York hardcore punk band Cro-Mags on drums; and "Heed My Warning,"(2013), described by Uber Rock (UK) as "a brand of thinking man's horror-themed rock." In 2019, he performed vocals for the acoustic version of the song Thank God It's Friday from Ice Nine Kills album The Silver Scream Final Cut.

Lehman has also composed, performed and recorded a number of soundtracks for independent films, including Alexia Anastasio's critically acclaimed all-female "Salome", and Vamp Films "Vampire the Movie", "which won the 2007 Rondo Award for Best Independent Feature."

== Filmography ==
Title	Year	Role	Notes/ref
Manny's Orphans	1978	Roger	Feature film Also distributed under the name Kick
Friday the 13th	1980	Jason Voorhees	Horror feature film
ThanXgiving	2006	Delbert Eaton	
Three Thug Mice	2008	voiceover	Animated short
Hell-ephone	2008	Professor/Circuit Maker	
Terror Overload	2009	Ray Rae	
His Name Was Jason: 30 Years of Friday the 13th	2009	Himself	Documentary film
Night On Has Been Mountain	2010	Invisible Man	
The Girl	2011	The Man	
House of Forbidden Secrets	2013	Building Crewman	
Crystal Lake Memories: The Complete History of Friday the 13th	2013	Himself	Documentary film
Easter Sunday	2014	Postman	
The Wicked One	2014	Count Creepy	
Pi Day Die Day	2016	Principal Hayward	Horror feature film
The Barn	2016	Rock	Horror feature film
Camp Killer	2016	Joe	
Rock Paper Dead	2017	Jason	Horror feature film
The Lurker	2019	Dr. Stratton	Horror feature film
Friday the 13th: Camp Crystal Legacy	2026	Himself	3 episodes; documentary web series
