= Barry Moss =

American casting director (1940–2014)

- Born: April 25, 1940; Los Angeles, California, U.S.
- Died: June 17, 2014 (aged 74); Manhattan, New York City, New York, United States
- Occupation: Casting director

Barry Moss (April 25, 1940 – June 17, 2014) was an American casting director of theatre, film, and television, and former child actor. Born in Los Angeles, California, he graduated from Fairfax High School and studied theatre at UCLA.

He was the casting director of over eighty Broadway plays and musicals. These included the original, Tony Award-winning productions of the plays Children of a Lesser God and Torch Song Trilogy and such Tony-winning musicals as Sophisticated Ladies, Nine, Woman of the Year, My One and Only, Black and Blue, Jelly's Last Jam, Grand Hotel, The Who's Tommy, and Titanic.

Moss was also a casting director on The Cosby Show for most of its run, from 1985 through 1992. It was Moss who got Adam Sandler cast on the show in the recurring role of Smitty, giving the fledgling actor and comedian his first screen role. The films on which Moss served as casting director include the original Friday the 13th, Endless Love, the Coen brothers' Blood Simple, A Chorus Line, Dominick and Eugene, My Boyfriend's Back, and Beavis and Butt-head Do America. He also provided casting services for such films as A Soldier's Story and the Adam Sandler movies Big Daddy and Little Nicky. In 2013, he was interviewed in a documentary film Crystal Lake Memories: The Complete History of Friday the 13th.

Moss died of congestive heart failure at Mount Sinai West in Manhattan on June 17, 2014. He was 74.
