= Paula Shaw =

American actress (1941–2025)

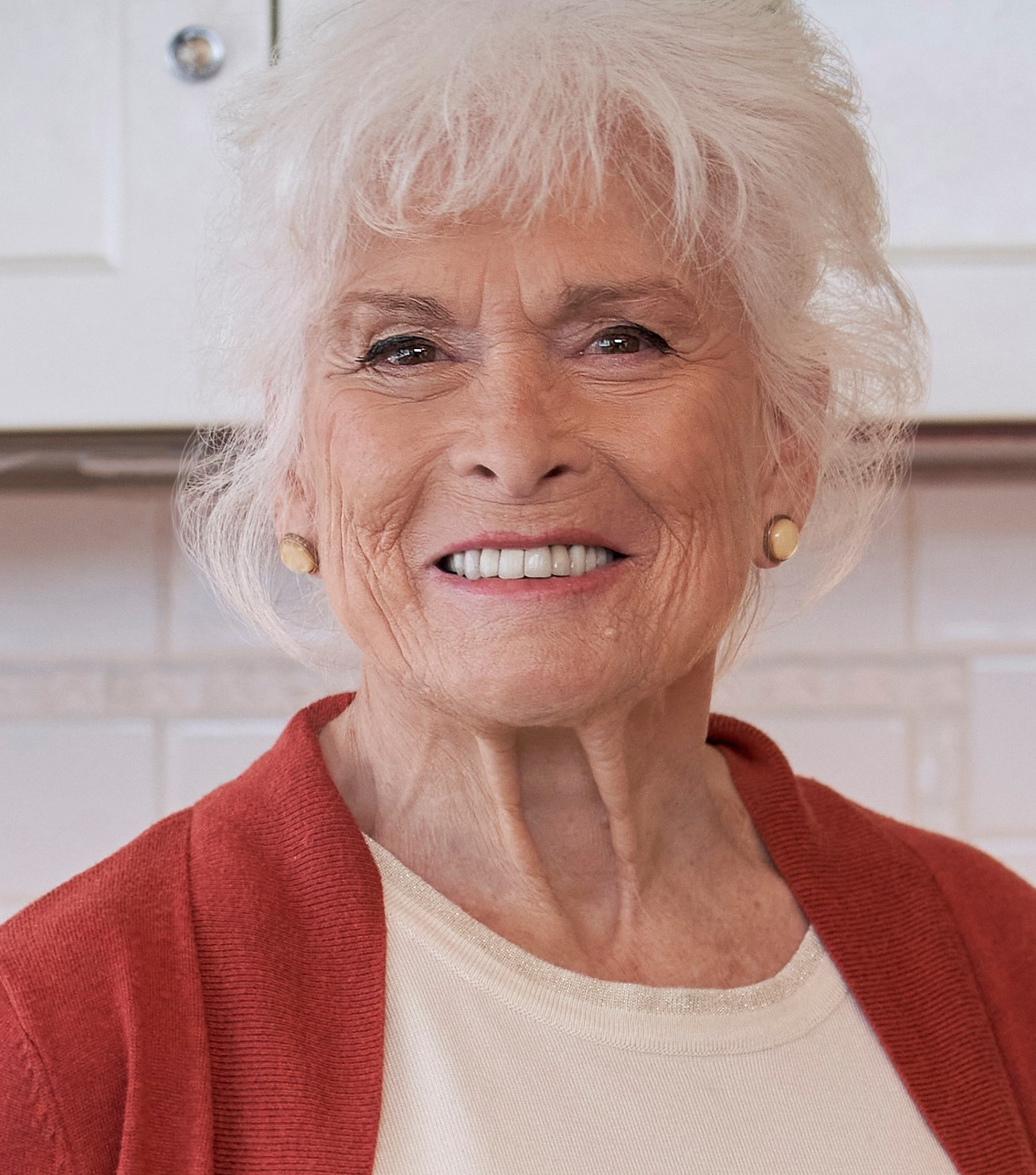
- Shaw in 2021
- Born: July 17, 1941; New York City, U.S.
- Died: September 10, 2025 (aged 84); Vancouver, British Columbia, Canada
- Occupation: Actress
- Years active: 1966–2025

Paula Shaw (July 17, 1941 – September 10, 2025) was an American actress. A life member of the Actors Studio, Shaw portrayed characters in numerous films and on television (including a role as prostitute on Barney Miller, season three, "Quarantine", and season four, "Bugs"). She is most well known for her role as Pamela Voorhees in Freddy vs. Jason.

== Death ==
Shaw died in her sleep after a long illness in Vancouver, Canada, on September 10, 2025, at the age of 84.

== Selected filmography ==
Year	Film	Role
1969	Freiheit für die Liebe	
1969	To Hex with Sex	Lucibel
1973	The Roommates	(Uncredited)
1974	The Bob Newhart Show	Dr. Tammy Ziegler
1974	The Centerfold Girls	Mrs. Walker
1977	In the Glitter Palace	Ruth
1977	Chatterbox	Policewoman
1977	Herowork	Woman in Convertible
1981	Three's Company	Ruth Wood
1982	The Best Little Whorehouse in Texas	Wulla Jean
1984	Savage Streets	Charlene
1986	Witchfire	Nurse Hemmings
1986	Say Yes	Society Reporter
1989	Communion	Woman from Apartment
1995	The X-Files	Ward Nurse
1998	Merchants of Venus	Dolores
2000	Reindeer Games	Aunt Lisbeth
2001	Ignition	Senator
2002	Insomnia	Coroner
2003	Night Creep	Dr. Wayborn
2003	Freddy vs. Jason	Pamela Voorhees
2005	Chupacabra Terror	Mrs. Hartman
2011–2013	Mr. Young	Mrs. Byrne
2013	Cedar Cove	Charlotte Jeffers
2014	Some Assembly Required	Edith
2017	Destination Wedding	Grandma Goldie
2017	Coming Home for Christmas	Pippa Marley
2019	Picture a Perfect Christmas	Louise
2020	Five Star Christmas	Margo
2021	It Was Always You (Hallmark)	Grandma Vivien
2021	Debbie Macomber's A Mrs. Miracle Christmas (Hallmark)	Helen Atwater (Nana)
2022	Hanukkah on Rye (Hallmark)	Esther
2023	Round and Round (Hallmark)	Grandma Rosie
