= Friday the 13th (franchise) =

American horror franchise

- Official franchise logo
- Created by: Victor Miller
- Original work: Friday the 13th (1980)
- Owners: Horror, Inc. (Note: Skydance owns the distribution rights to the films and the 1987–1990 TV series through their subsidiaries: Through Paramount Pictures, they own the domestic distribution rights to the 1980 film, the distribution rights to the 1981–1989 films, the international distribution rights to the 2009 reboot film, and the distribution rights to the 1987–1990 TV series.; Through Warner Bros. Entertainment, they own the international distribution rights to the 1980 film, the distribution rights to the 1993–2003 films, the domestic distribution rights to the 2009 reboot film, and the trademark of the Friday the 13th brand and characters.)
- Years: 1980–present

Print publications
- Books: List of books
- Novels: List of novels
- Comics: List of comics

Films and television
- Films: List of films
- Television series: Friday the 13th: The Series (1987–1990); Crystal Lake (2026)

Games
- Video games: List of video games

Audio
- Soundtracks: List of music

Miscellaneous
- Character(s): List of characters

Friday the 13th is an American horror media franchise that comprises twelve slasher films, two television shows, novels, comic books, video games, and tie‑in merchandise. The franchise primarily focuses on the fictional serial killer Jason Voorhees, who was thought to have drowned as a boy at Camp Crystal Lake due to the negligence of the camp staff. Decades later, the lake is rumored to be "cursed" and is the setting for a series of mass murders. Jason is featured in all of the films, as either the killer or the motivation for the killings. The original film was written by Victor Miller, produced and directed by Sean S. Cunningham, and released by Paramount Pictures. The films have grossed over $468 million at the box office. Among the twelve films was a crossover film featuring fellow horror icon Freddy Krueger from the A Nightmare on Elm Street franchise.

Although the films were not popular with critics, Friday the 13th is considered one of the most successful media franchises in America—not only for the success of the films, but also because of the extensive merchandising and repeated references to the series in popular culture. Jason's hockey mask has become one of the most recognizable images in horror and popular culture.

== Films ==
Film	U.S. release date	Director	Screenwriter(s)	Story	Producer(s)
Friday the 13th	May 9, 1980	Sean S. Cunningham	Victor Miller	Victor Miller	Sean S. Cunningham
Friday the 13th Part 2	May 1, 1981	Steve Miner	Ron Kurz	Ron Kurz	Steve Miner
Friday the 13th Part III	August 13, 1982	Steve Miner	Martin Kitrosser & Carol Watson	Martin Kitrosser & Carol Watson	Frank Mancuso Jr.
Friday the 13th: The Final Chapter	April 13, 1984	Joseph Zito	Barney Cohen	Bruce Hidemi Sakow	Frank Mancuso Jr.
Friday the 13th: A New Beginning	March 22, 1985	Danny Steinmann	Martin Kitrosser & David Cohen and Danny Steinmann	Martin Kitrosser & David Cohen	Timothy Silver
Friday the 13th Part VI: Jason Lives	August 1, 1986	Tom McLoughlin	Tom McLoughlin	Tom McLoughlin	Don Behrns
Friday the 13th Part VII: The New Blood	May 13, 1988	John Carl Buechler	Daryl Haney and Manuel Fidello	Daryl Haney and Manuel Fidello	Iain Paterson
Friday the 13th Part VIII: Jason Takes Manhattan	July 28, 1989	Rob Hedden	Rob Hedden	Rob Hedden	Randolph Cheveldave
Jason Goes to Hell: The Final Friday	August 13, 1993	Adam Marcus	Dean Lorey and Jay Huguely	Jay Huguely and Adam Marcus	Sean S. Cunningham
Jason X	April 26, 2002 (Note: The film was released in Spain in November 2001 for a single showing, but was not released widely until April 2002.)	James Isaac	Todd Farmer	Todd Farmer	Noel J. Cunningham
Freddy vs. Jason	August 15, 2003	Ronny Yu	Damian Shannon & Mark Swift	Damian Shannon & Mark Swift	Sean S. Cunningham
Friday the 13th	February 13, 2009	Marcus Nispel	Damian Shannon & Mark Swift	Damian Shannon & Mark Swift and Mark Wheaton	Michael Bay, Andrew Form, Brad Fuller and Sean S. Cunningham
Jason	August 13, 2027	Steve Miner	David Fliegel	David Fliegel	Rob Barsamian and Robbie Barsamian

=== Overview ===
In the original Friday the 13th (1980), Mrs. Pamela Voorhees (Betsy Palmer) stalks and murders the teenagers preparing Camp Crystal Lake for re‑opening. She is determined to ensure the camp does not reopen, after her son Jason (Ari Lehman) drowned in the lake, due to the negligence of two staff members. The last counselor, Alice Hardy (Adrienne King), fends off Mrs. Voorhees long enough to grab a machete and decapitate her. In Friday the 13th Part 2 (1981), Jason (Steve Daskewisz/Warrington Gillette) is revealed to be alive and fully grown. After killing Alice Hardy, Jason returns to Crystal Lake to guard it from all intruders. Five years later, a group of teenagers arrive at Crystal Lake to be trained as camp counselors, but Jason murders them. Ginny Field (Amy Steel), the last counselor Jason attempts to kill, finds a cabin in the woods with a shrine built around the severed head of Mrs. Voorhees. Ginny fights back and slams a machete through Jason's shoulder. Jason is left for dead as Ginny is taken away in an ambulance.

During the events of Friday the 13th Part III (1982), Jason (Richard Brooker) removes the machete from his shoulder and finds his way to Chris Higgins' (Dana Kimmell) local homestead. Chris returns to her property with some teens, and Jason kills anyone who wanders into the barn where he is hiding. Taking a hockey mask from a victim to hide his face, Jason leaves the barn to kill the rest of the group. Chris seemingly kills Jason with an axe to his head, but the night's events drive her into hysteria as the police take her away. Friday the 13th: The Final Chapter (1984) continues where Part III leaves off, with Jason (Ted White) found by the police and taken to the local morgue after removing the axe. Upon arrival, Jason awakens to kill the coroner and a nurse before returning to Crystal Lake. A group of teens rents a house on Crystal Lake and fall victim to Jason's rampage. After killing the teens, Jason seeks out Trish (Kimberly Beck) and Tommy Jarvis (Corey Feldman), who live next door. While distracted by Trish, Jason is attacked and ultimately killed by Tommy.

Friday the 13th: A New Beginning (1985) follows Tommy Jarvis (John Shepherd), who was committed to a mental health institution after the events of The Final Chapter and grew up constantly afraid that Jason (Tom Morga) would return. Roy Burns (Dick Wieand) uses Jason's persona to become a copycat killer at the halfway home to which Tommy has moved. Tommy, supervisor Pam (Melanie Kinnaman), and a young boy named Reggie (Shavar Ross) manage to defeat Roy. They eventually learn that Roy had a son who was murdered by one of the patients at the institution, triggering Roy to take on Jason's likeness and kill everyone there. Friday the 13th Part VI: Jason Lives (1986) begins with Tommy (Thom Mathews) visiting Jason's grave after being released from another mental institution. Tommy inadvertently resurrects Jason (C. J. Graham) with a piece of the fence surrounding the cemetery acting as a lightning rod. Jason immediately heads back to Crystal Lake and kills the people working at the new summer camp. Tommy eventually chains Jason to a boulder that he tosses into the lake, where he leaves Jason who is revealed to be alive.

Friday the 13th Part VII: The New Blood (1988) begins an indeterminate length of time after Jason Lives. Jason (Kane Hodder) is resurrected again by the telekinetic Tina Shepard (Lar Park Lincoln), who is trying to resurrect her father whom Tina caused to drown in the lake when she was a child. Jason once again kills those who occupy Crystal Lake and is returned to the bottom of the lake after a battle with Tina. Jason is resurrected again in Friday the 13th Part VIII: Jason Takes Manhattan (1989) by an underwater electrical cable. He follows a group of students on their senior class cruise to Manhattan, where he kills the ship's crew and the majority of the students. Upon reaching Manhattan, Jason chases Rennie (Jensen Daggett) and Sean (Scott Reeves), the two remaining students, into the sewers. Jason eventually melts away when the sewer is flooded with toxic waste.

In Jason Goes to Hell: The Final Friday (1993), Jason, through an unexplained resurrection, is hunted by the FBI at Crystal Lake. The FBI sets up a sting that successfully kills Jason. Through possession, Jason manages to survive by passing his black heart from one being to the next. It is revealed that he has a sister and a niece, and that he needs them to get his body back. Jason resurrects himself, but his niece, Jessica Kimble (Kari Keegan), stabs him with a mystical dagger and he is dragged into Hell. Jason X (2001) takes place in the future, when Jason has again been inexplicably resurrected. A scientist, Rowan LaFontaine (Lexa Doig), decides that cryonic suspension is the only method of stopping him, but Jason breaks free and kills the army personnel guarding him before he can be again imprisoned. Rowan manages to lure Jason into the cryo‑chamber, but he ruptures the tank and freezes both himself and Rowan. Over 400 years later, a team of students studying Earth discover Jason's body and take it into space. Upon being thawed by the team, he proceeds to murder everyone aboard the spacecraft. He is seemingly killed, but is then resurrected via nanotechnology as a cyborg version of himself. Finally, he is ejected into space and incinerated by Earth Two's atmosphere, his mask falling to the bottom of a lake.

The next Friday the 13th film, Freddy vs. Jason (2003), was a crossover with A Nightmare on Elm Street. Set in the contemporary period, Freddy Krueger (Robert Englund) resurrects Jason (Ken Kirzinger) and sends him to Springwood hoping that he will create enough fear among the residents that Freddy will be strong enough to invade their dreams. Jason accomplishes this but refuses to stop killing. A battle ensues both in the dream-world and at Crystal Lake. The outcome is left ambiguous, as Jason surfaces from the lake holding Freddy's severed head, which winks and laughs.

In 2009, a new Friday the 13th film which restarted the film series continuity was released. In this film, after witnessing his mother being beheaded at a young age, an adult Jason (Derek Mears) follows in her footsteps and kills anyone who comes to Crystal Lake. Jason subsequently kidnaps a young woman, Whitney Miller (Amanda Righetti), who resembles his mother at a young age. Six weeks after her disappearance, her brother, Clay Miller (Jared Padalecki), comes to look for her. The pair reunite and work together to seemingly kill Jason.

=== Development ===
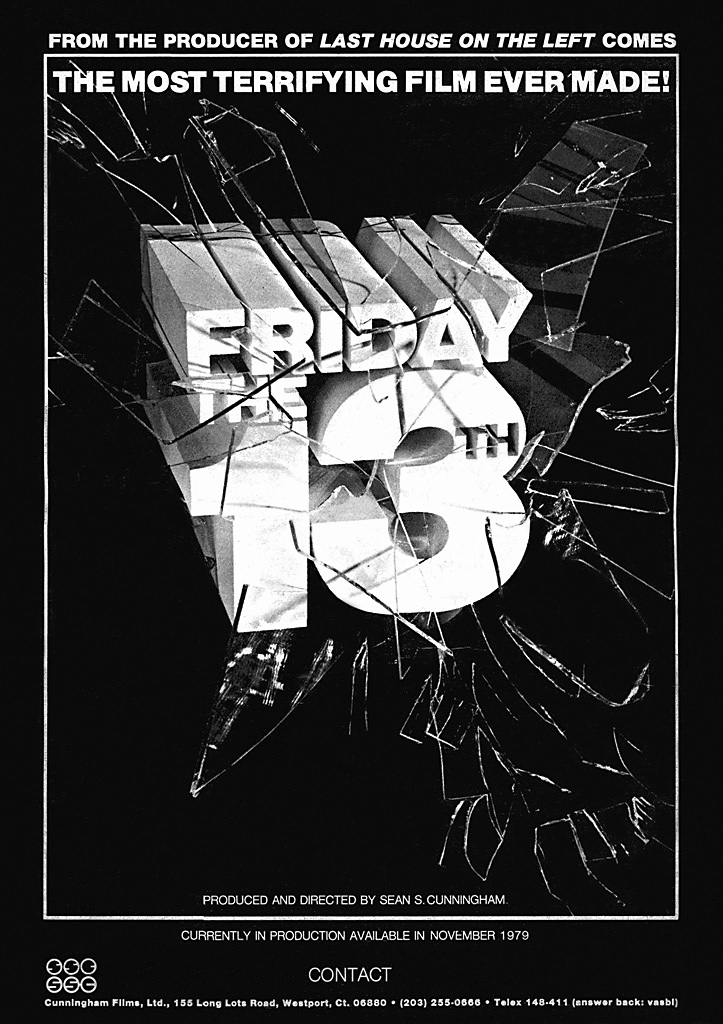
Friday the 13th did not have a completed script when Sean S. Cunningham took out this advertisement in International Variety magazine.

The original Friday the 13th was produced and directed by Sean S. Cunningham, who had previously worked with filmmaker Wes Craven on The Last House on the Left (1972). Cunningham, inspired by the success of John Carpenter's Halloween (1978), wanted Friday the 13th to be shocking, visually stunning, and "[make] you jump out of your seat". Distancing himself from The Last House on the Left, Cunningham wanted Friday the 13th to be more of a "roller coaster ride". The first film was meant to be "a real scary movie", and at the same time make audiences laugh. The concept for Friday the 13th began as nothing more than a title. A Long Night at Camp Blood was the working title Victor Miller used while he drafted a script, but Cunningham believed in his "Friday the 13th" moniker and rushed to place an advertisement in International Variety. Worrying that someone else owned the rights to the title and wanting to avoid potential lawsuits, Cunningham thought it would be best to find out immediately. Cunningham commissioned a New York advertising agency to develop his visual concept of the Friday the 13th logo, which consisted of big block letters bursting through a pane of glass. In the end, Cunningham believed there were "no problems" with the title, but distributor George Mansour contends that there was an issue: "There was a movie before ours called Friday the 13th: The Orphan. Moderately successful. But someone still threatened to sue. It is unknown whether Phil [Scuderi] paid them off, but the issue was eventually resolved."

Following the success of Friday the 13th in 1980, Paramount Pictures began plans to make a sequel and immediately acquired the worldwide distribution rights. According to Paramount Pictures' Chairman and CEO Frank Mancuso Sr., "We wanted it to be an event, where teenagers would flock to the theaters on that Friday night to see the latest episode." Initial ideas for a sequel involved the Friday the 13th title being used for a series of discontinuous films, released once a year, and each would be a separate "scary movie" of its own right. Phil Scuderi—a co‑owner of Esquire Theaters with Steve Minasian and Bob Barsamian and a producer of the original film—insisted that the sequel must have Jason Voorhees, Pamela's son, even though his appearance at the end of the original film was only meant to be a joke. Steve Miner, associate producer of the first film, believed in the idea, and he ultimately directed the first two sequels after Cunningham opted not to return to the director's chair.

The studio continued to generate sequels over the years, based on the financial success they produced compared to their relatively low budgets. With every film repeating the same basic premise, the filmmakers came up with subtle adjustments so the audience would return. Changes involved the addition of a subtitle—as opposed to just a number attached to the end—like "The Final Chapter" and "Jason Takes Manhattan", or filming the movie in 3-D, as Miner did for Friday the 13th Part III. The third film would also be the birthplace of one of the most recognizable images in popular culture, that of Jason's hockey mask. Producer Frank Mancuso Jr. eventually decided to kill Jason for good, after he experienced problems finding new films to produce that were more than just horror movies, because his name brought constant association to the Friday the 13th film series.

Jason would not stay buried for long, as the success of The Final Chapter ensured another Friday the 13th film. Mancuso Sr. stated, "Quite simply, the public still wanted to see these films. So until they really stopped coming, why not continue to make more?" A New Beginning shifted the focus of the story to the character of Tommy Jarvis and how he battles his inner demons, hallucinations, and "rages to kill" after his ordeal with Jason in The Final Chapter. This premise was not repeated, as the very next installment brought Jason back from the dead. Jason Lives attempted to create a "funnier, faster, and more action-packed [...] Friday" than had previously been done. The limited financial success of Jason Lives provided enough incentive to create another sequel, The New Blood. The idea proposed by screenwriter Daryl Haney stemmed from his realization that the films always ended with Jason battling the "final girl". Haney decided that this final girl should have telekinetic powers, which led Producer Barbara Sachs to dub the film, Jason vs. Carrie.

Okay, we'll make Vancouver look like New York and we'll do it that way. But they came back again with, 'You can't do the Brooklyn Bridge in Vancouver. You can't do Madison Square Garden in Vancouver. You can't do the Statue of Liberty in Vancouver.' Pretty soon it was half New York, half on the boat. Then it was the last third in New York. It just kept getting whittled down and down.

— Rob Hedden (writer/director) on the deconstruction of Jason Takes Manhattan's story

Plans were made to take Jason away from Crystal Lake and place him in a larger environment for the eighth film. New York City was selected as the main setting, with Jason spending approximately a third of the movie on a boat before reaching New York. The film was then subtitled Jason Takes Manhattan. Ultimately, the character spent the majority of the time on the cruise ship, as budget restrictions forced scenes of New York to be trimmed or downgraded. Vancouver had to substitute for the majority of the New York scenes.

When Jason Takes Manhattan failed to perform successfully at the box office, Sean Cunningham decided that he wanted to reacquire the rights to Friday the 13th from Paramount and start working with New Line Cinema on Freddy vs. Jason, as New Line owned the Nightmare on Elm Street franchise. The concept of a fight between Freddy and Jason was not new, since Paramount had approached New Line about filming a crossover years before the latter had gained the licensing rights to Friday the 13th. At that time, both companies wanted the license to the other's character so that they could control the making of the film. Negotiations on the project were never finalized, which led Paramount to make The New Blood. After Jason Takes Manhattan was released in 1989, the rights reverted to Scuderi, Minasian, and Barsamianto, who sold them to New Line. Before Cunningham could start working on Freddy vs. Jason, Wes Craven returned to New Line to make New Nightmare. This effectively put Freddy vs. Jason on hold, but allowed Cunningham the chance to bring Jason back into the spotlight with Jason Goes to Hell. The ninth installment "turned a healthy profit", though it was only intended to open the door for a crossover with Freddy Krueger rather than to start a new series for New Line. Ultimately, the film series would go through another sequel before that would happen.

Cunningham's "frustration" with the delayed development of the Freddy vs. Jason project forced him to create another sequel in an effort to keep the franchise in the minds of audiences. Based on Jason Takes Manhattan's concept of taking Jason away from Crystal Lake, the 10th film would put the titular character in space. The film suffered from the loss of its biggest supporter, President of Production Michael De Luca, when he resigned from his position. Lack of support forced the finished film to sit for two years before finally being released on April 26, 2002, and it would go on to become the lowest-grossing film in the franchise at the domestic box office. It also held the distinction of having the largest budget of any of the previous films at that time. After more than 15 years of off-and-on development, and approximately $6 million spent in 18 unused scripts from more than a dozen screenwriters, New Line finally produced a Freddy and Jason crossover for 2003. One of the biggest hurdles for the film was developing a story that managed to bring the two horror icons together. Potential stories varied widely, from Freddy having molested and drowned Jason as a child, to a cult of Freddy worshipers called the "Fred Heads".

In January 2007, Platinum Dunes producers Andrew Form and Brad Fuller outlined their intended goal to bring a Friday the 13th reboot to life. New Line approached Fuller and Form to create a reboot, but because Paramount still owned certain copyrights to the first film, the reboot would not be able to use anything from the original. Paramount, who wanted to be included in the development of a reboot, approached the producers and gave them license to use anything from the original films, including the title. With Paramount on board, Fuller and Form decided they wanted to use pieces from the early films. Fuller said, "I think there are moments we want to address, like how does the hockey mask happen." Shannon and Swift, writers of Freddy vs. Jason, were brought on to pen the script for the new film, with Marcus Nispel, director of The Texas Chainsaw Massacre remake of 2003, hired in November 2007 to direct.

=== Box office ===
As of 2023, the Friday the 13th series is the second-highest grossing horror movie franchise domestically, grossing $908.4 million over twelve films, only behind Halloween ($1.09 billion) and ahead of A Nightmare on Elm Street ($793.5 million), Scream ($779.5 million), Saw ($688.3 million), The Texas Chainsaw Massacre ($459.7 million), and Child's Play ($305.2 million), all adjusted for inflation.

The films' financial success has extended to home releases, with more than five million DVDs sold by 2005.

Film	Year	Budget	Box office (USD)			Reference
Film	Year	Budget	United States	International	Worldwide	Reference
Friday the 13th	1980	$550K	$39.76 million	$20 million	$59.75 million	
Friday the 13th Part 2	1981	$1.25 million	$21.72 million	$491	$21.72 million	
Friday the 13th Part III	1982	$2.5 million	$36.69 million	$6,604	$36.69 million	
Friday the 13th: The Final Chapter	1984	$2.6 million	$32.98 million	$2,014	$32.98 million	
Friday the 13th: A New Beginning	1985	$2.2 million	$21.93 million		$21.93 million	
Friday the 13th Part VI: Jason Lives	1986	$3 million	$19.47 million	$752	$19.47 million	
Friday the 13th Part VII: The New Blood	1988	$2.8 million	$19.17 million		$19.17 million	
Friday the 13th Part VIII: Jason Takes Manhattan	1989	$5 million	$14.34 million		$14.34 million	
Jason Goes to Hell: The Final Friday	1993	$3 million	$15.94 million		$15.94 million	
Jason X	2001	$14 million	$13.12 million	$3.96 million	$17.1 million	
Freddy vs. Jason	2003	$30 million	$82.63 million	$34.01 million	$116.6 million	
Friday the 13th	2009	$19 million	$65 million	$27.67 million	$92.67 million	
Total		$80.9 million	$383.3 million	$83.78 million	$468.24 million	

=== Critical response ===
Critical and public response of Friday the 13th films
Film	Rotten Tomatoes	Metacritic	CinemaScore
Friday the 13th (1980)	49% (123 reviews)	22 (11 reviews)	
Friday the 13th Part 2	28% (106 reviews)	26 (8 reviews)	
Friday the 13th Part III	17% (106 reviews)	30 (7 reviews)	
Friday the 13th: The Final Chapter	20% (80 reviews)	33 (7 reviews)	
Friday the 13th: A New Beginning	11% (84 reviews)	16 (8 reviews)	
Friday the 13th Part VI: Jason Lives	39% (88 reviews)	30 (10 reviews)	B
Friday the 13th Part VII: The New Blood	21% (75 reviews)	13 (9 reviews)	B
Friday the 13th Part VIII: Jason Takes Manhattan	8% (84 reviews)	14 (10 reviews)	C+
Jason Goes to Hell: The Final Friday	11% (70 reviews)	17 (11 reviews)	
Jason X	27% (157 reviews)	25 (23 reviews)	C
Freddy vs. Jason	42% (214 reviews)	37 (29 reviews)	B+
Friday the 13th (2009)	27% (183 reviews)	34 (29 reviews)	B-

Every film in the franchise received generally negative reviews upon release except for Part VI, which was met more positively. In the years since their releases, the first two films gained mixed retrospectives reviews, while the reception for The Final Chapter became more positive.

=== Impact ===
In December 2006, IGN ranked Friday the 13th seventh in the top 25 film franchises. Qualifications included: the franchise must have at least three films released before December 2006; the franchises must be either a commercial or artistic success; and the franchise must have had some form of impact on popular culture. Three senior editors, the editor-in-chief, and IGN's entertainment editorial manager judged the various film franchises. In commenting on Friday the 13th's seventh-place ranking, the general consensus among the reviewers was that even though the Halloween franchise started the slasher genre, Friday the 13th became one of "the most influential franchises of the 1980s" and that its commercial success through 11 films, novelizations, comic books, and other collectables is proof of its legacy. ABC Online's Arts and Entertainment reporter, Gary Kemble, makes note of the popularity of the franchise throughout popular culture. Kemble points out that Jason's mask, which was not adopted until the third film in the series, is one of the most widely recognizable images in popular culture. Talking with Brenna O'Brien, co‑founder of the Fridaythe13thfilms.com website, the pair discusses how the fan base of the franchise has become so impassioned with the series that they have created films, latex body suits to emulate Jason's appearance, and tattoos of Jason and the Friday the 13th moniker on their body.

Everybody in the audience imitated hoot‑owls and hyenas. Another girl [in the film] went to her room and started to undress. Five guys sitting together [in the theater] started a chant: 'We want boobs!'

— Karnick believes that this excerpt from Ebert's review of Friday the 13th Part 2 shows how critics have misunderstood the point the Friday the 13th films have tried to make.

S. T. Karnick, editor of American Culture, wrote an article for the National Review detailing the impact Friday the 13th has had on the slasher genre and noting that the reasons critics have deplored the films are the same reasons why the franchise has had such a strong influence. Karnick explained that Friday the 13th did not try and recreate the same "clever" film that John Carpenter made in 1978, but instead "[codified] the formula" of Halloween, and "[boiled] it down to its essentials" so that it could be copied by other filmmakers. In his assessment, Friday the 13th changed the horror genre by purposefully not providing back‑stories for characters so that when the audience witnessed a character's death, they are "strangely unaffected". Instead, Friday the 13th focuses on the history and motivations of the killer, who would exact revenge not on the people directly responsible, but on innocent people—a formula Karnick notes was replicated in A Nightmare on Elm Street, Child's Play, Scream, I Know What You Did Last Summer, Saw, the Hannibal Lecter films, and the Halloween sequels. As Karnick sees it, "these films spoke directly to fears of increasing crime and social dislocation [and] provided audiences with ways to detach from these worries and conquer their fears of violence by laughing at it".

In Karnick's eyes, contemporary critics have failed to see how the film has affected audiences and subsequently branded the film series as "both irresponsible (for numbing audiences to violence) and puritanical (for showing the murders of sexually active teens)". Quoting director John Carpenter, Karnick emphasized that "teens thus dispatched became victims not as punishment for sexual activity but simply because they were too preoccupied to notice the presence of a murderer". Pointing to Roger Ebert as a prime example of how critics have misunderstood the films (Ebert wrote that during a screening of Friday the 13th Part 2, he noticed that the audience had no sympathy for the victims and cheered during death scenes), Karnick explains that Ebert's remarks show how the film series forces "audiences to experience the very thing that motivates the murders: a lack of compassion". In closing, Karnick suggested that these films were not puritanical, but proved that audiences "could be just as indifferent and callous as the characters in the films".

=== Future ===
In October 2009, Warner Bros. Pictures set a release date for a sequel to Friday the 13th as August 13, 2010. On December 10, 2009, however, the sequel was pulled from its release date and was delayed indefinitely. In April 2010, producer Brad Fuller announced that a sequel to the film was not happening. In February 2011, Fuller announced that Damian Shannon and Mark Swift had finished a script for the sequel. In June 2013, Warner Bros. relinquished their film rights to the Friday the 13th franchise to Paramount. During the same month, however, Derek Mears (who portrayed Jason Voorhees in the 2009 film) revealed that Paramount was working with Platinum Dunes to produce a sequel to the remake. However, the sequel was later developed into a separate installment of the franchise. The rights to the franchise reverted to New Line/Warners in 2018.

In January 2023, writer Jeff Locker said that he, alongside Jeremy Weiss and Sean S. Cunningham, pitched a new Friday the 13th reboot, while also having a plan for an alternate direct sequel to the original film. In May 2024, Cunningham explained that a new Friday the 13th film would not be released for at least three years due to movie studios being hesitant to fund a horror movie that may not be a financial success. In July 2025, Robbie Barsamian revealed a new film and video game are in the works. In March 2026, Sean S. Cunningham stated in an interview with TMZ that a treatment for an "old school" Friday the 13th film had been completed. He also indicated that he and franchise co-creator Victor Miller had resolved their dispute, and suggested that a potential merger between Warner Bros. and Paramount Pictures could provide significant momentum by addressing the longstanding rights issues that had hindered the project.

In November 2026, a new film titled Jason was officially announced, which will be directed by Steve Miner, written by David Fliegel, produced by Horror, Inc. and Catchlight Studios and distributed by Cineverse.

== Television ==
Series	Season	Episodes	First released	Last released	Creator	Network
Crystal Lake	1	8	October 15, 2026		Brad Caleb Kane	Peacock

=== Friday the 13th: The Series (1987–1990) ===
On September 28, 1987, Paramount began airing Friday the 13th: The Series, a television series that focuses on two cousins' attempts to recover cursed antiques that were sold from a shop they inherited from their uncle. The show starred John D. LeMay as Ryan Dallion and Louise Robey as Michelle Foster. It was created by Frank Mancuso Jr. and Larry B. Williams originally under the title of The 13th Hour, and the series ran for 72 episodes. Mancuso Jr. never intended to link the television show directly to the film series, but he utilized "the idea of Friday the 13th, which is that it symbolizes bad luck and curses". The creators wanted to tie‑in Jason's trademark hockey mask to the series, but the idea was discarded so that the show could have a chance to exist on its own. Mancuso Jr. was afraid that mentioning any events from the films would take the audience away from "the new world that we were trying to create". The decision to name the show Friday the 13th over the original title was made because Mancuso Jr. believed a "Friday the 13th" moniker would better help to sell the show to networks. Filming took place in Toronto, Ontario, Canada. Friday the 13th: The Series initially aired in first-run syndication in a late-night spot; the success of the series as a late-night show prompted some broadcasting stations to move it to primetime. Produced on a budget estimated below $500,000 per episode, the first season placed second in the male 18-to-49-year-old demographic, just behind Paramount's Star Trek: The Next Generation. In addition, the first season placed fifth in the female 18-to-49-year-old demographic.

In 1988, the sci-fi sitcom Red Dwarf joked about the franchise's high number of sequels in the episode "Better Than Life". Taking place 3 million years in the future, when checking through the mail, one of the characters picks up a copy of "Friday the 13th part 1649".

=== Crystal Lake (2026) ===
In September 2003, during a panel session at the Maniafest convention, Sean S. Cunningham spoke about the possibility of bringing Friday the 13th to television, with the series focusing on a group of teenagers living in the Crystal Lake area. In October 2005, Cunningham discussed the potential series further. He explained that the idea was to call the series Crystal Lake Chronicles, and "set [it] in a town with all this Jason history". The series would focus more on "coming-of-age issues", in a similar style to Buffy the Vampire Slayer, Dawson's Creek, and Smallville, with Jason as more of a recurring "background" character.

On October 31, 2022, a Friday the 13th prequel series was announced, titled Crystal Lake. It was originally set to be written and executive produced by Bryan Fuller and Victor Miller, along with executive producers Marc Toberoff and Rob Barsamian. A24 will serve as the studio behind the series and will air on Peacock. In January 2023, Adrienne King was cast in a recurring undisclosed role. She previously portrayed Alice Hardy in the 1980 original film and 1981 sequel. Writing for the series was slated to begin in late January 2023 with Kevin Williamson writing one episode. In May 2024, it was revealed that Fuller had been fired from the series after A24 elected to take the series in a different direction. Production was set to commence once a new showrunner had been hired and no casting had taken place. In August 2024, Brad Caleb Kane was revealed to be the new showrunner for the series. In March 2025, it was announced that Linda Cardellini was cast as Pamela Voorhees. Principal photography began on June 20, 2025 and concluded on October 19. The series premiered on October 15, 2026.

=== Critical response ===
Critical response to Friday the 13th series
Series	Season	Rotten Tomatoes	Metacritic
Friday the 13th: The Series	1	62% (13 reviews)	—N/a
Friday the 13th: The Series	2	83% (6 reviews)	—N/a
Friday the 13th: The Series	3	—N/a	—N/a
Crystal Lake	1	77% (77 reviews)	61 (22 reviews)

== Music ==
When Harry Manfredini began working on the musical score for the 1980 film, the decision was made to play the music only alongside the killer so as not to trick the audience into believing that the killer was around during moments that they were not supposed to be. Manfredini explains that the lack of music for certain scenes was deliberate: "There's a scene where one of the girls [...] is setting up the archery area [...] One of the guys shoots an arrow into the target and just misses her. It's a huge scare, but if you notice, there's no music. That was a choice". Manfredini also noted that when something was about to happen, the music would cut off so that the audience would relax a bit, which allowed the scare to become more effective.

Friday the 13th theme
Harry Manfredini's theme, used to identify the presence of the killer in the Friday the 13th film series

Since Mrs. Voorhees, the killer in the original Friday the 13th, does not show up until the final reel of the film, Manfredini had the job of creating a score that would represent the killer in her absence. Manfredini was inspired by the 1975 film Jaws, where the shark is not seen for the majority of the film, but the motif created by John Williams cued the audience as to when the shark was present during scenes and unseen. While listening to a piece of Krzysztof Penderecki music, which contained a chorus with "striking pronunciations", Manfredini was inspired to recreate a similar sound for Friday the 13th. He came up with the sound "ki ki ki, ma ma ma", based on the line "Kill her mommy!", which Mrs. Voorhees recites repeatedly in the final reel. The "ki" comes from "kill", and the "ma" from "mommy". To achieve the unique sound he wanted for the film, Manfredini spoke the two words "harshly, distinctly, and rhythmically into a microphone" and ran them into an echo reverberation machine. Manfredini finished the original score after a few weeks and recorded it in a friend's basement. Victor Miller and assistant editor Jay Keuper have commented on how memorable the music is, with Keuper describing it as "iconographic". Manfredini makes note of the mispronunciation of the sounds: "Everybody thinks it's cha, cha, cha. I'm like, 'Cha, cha, cha'? What are you talking about?"

When Manfredini returned for the first sequel, he had an easier time composing since he only needed to perfect what he had already created. Over the course of the sequels, Manfredini loosened the philosophy that the theme should be reserved just for the killer. Manfredini describes the style of the sequels as more of a "setting 'em up and knocking 'em down" approach, which meant that there were more "McGuffins and red‑herrings" that required the killer's theme music be played to try to trick the audience. Manfredini explains: "The original had the real myopic approach, and then we had to start thinking of the sequels as more conventional films". For Part III, Manfredini only returned to score the first and last reels of the film because he was busy with a Broadway production. Jack Tillar pieced together portions of the score from the first two films to fill the remaining time for Part III, while Michael Zagar composed an opening and closing theme. Manfredini and Zagar met at the latter's apartment, where Zagar rescored the original opening theme using a disco beat. Manfredini returned for The Final Chapter, and although there were similar elements to the score, everything was newly recorded for the fourth Friday the 13th.

When he began work on the score for A New Beginning, Manfredini created a theme just for the character of Tommy Jarvis. The idea was to suggest that there was "madness afoot", which he believed helped to "'point the finger' at various characters [...] to suggest that things were not as you might expect". For Jason Lives, Tom McLoughlin instructed Manfredini to create a score that would not alert the audience about what was happening or about to happen, "but instead allow the audience to do it to themselves". McLoughlin took this idea from John Carpenter's 1978 film Halloween, which would always follow any shock in the film with Carpenter's "Eeeeeeee!" sound. McLoughlin wanted something more subtle, with a "Gothic" resonance.

Manfredini did not score The New Blood and Jason Takes Manhattan because of prior film engagements, but his scores from previous films were reused. While Manfredini was working on Sean Cunningham's DeepStar Six, producer Iain Paterson hired Fred Mollin, who was scoring Friday the 13th: The Series, to finish composing the music to The New Blood. Manfredini's original music only filled half the film. Mollin returned to fully score Jason Takes Manhattan, and worked with Steve Mizer to write an original song reminiscent of Robert Plant for the opening credits. Manfredini would score the next two entries in the series before being replaced on Freddy vs. Jason. The official reason for Manfredini's replacement was because New Line wanted to take the series in a "new direction", but Manfredini contends that the final cut of Freddy vs. Jason was "just the same thing".

In Crystal Lake was composed by Italian musician Giosuè Greco who scored the series with Manfredini did both the main title theme and end credits theme only in the series finale episode.

== Cancelled projects ==
=== Freddy vs. Jason sequel ===
Following the box office performance and ambiguous ending of the crossover slasher film Freddy vs. Jason (2003), plans were being made for a follow-up film based on the storyline of the comic sequel which delved into the concept of including Ash Williams of the Evil Dead franchise and recurring characters from both A Nightmare on Elm Street and Friday the 13th franchises. However, due to creative differences between New Line Cinema and actor Bruce Campbell, the film was scrapped.

=== Warner Bros. Pictures: 2009–2010 ===
Shortly after the 2009 reboot's theatrical release, producers Brad Fuller and Andrew Form expressed an interest in producing another Friday the 13th film, citing the enjoyment they had working on the reboot. In October 2009, Warner Bros. Pictures planned to release the Friday the 13th sequel on August 13, 2010, but on December 10, the studio pulled the sequel from the planned release slot and listed its release as "TBD" (to be determined). Warner Bros. also announced that Damian Shannon and Mark Swift were penning the sequel. In April 2010, Fuller announced on his Twitter page that a sequel to the 2009 remake was no longer in the works, declaring it, "dead — not happening". In a later interview, Fuller explained that the 2009 reboot was the result of a joint effort between Paramount and New Line Cinema, as both owned portions of the Friday the 13th franchise. With financial problems, both studios were limiting the films they produced each year, opting to produce films carrying lower risks and higher rewards. Accordingly, the companies put Friday the 13th Part 2 on hold in hopes that they would move forward with this next installment when the economy bounced back. Form explained that neither studio would walk away from the sequel's production to allow the other to move forward as the primary producing house, each studio concerned that its players would look like "idiots" should the sequel perform well without its involvement. Form and Fuller also mentioned that the Friday the 13th sequel may be a 3‑D film, should it ever again be green-lit for production by the studios.

=== Paramount: 2013–2017 ===
Shannon and Swift completed the script for the sequel in February 2011, according to Fuller's claim on Twitter. He was ready to begin production, but New Line was not. In June 2013, Warners relinquished its film rights to the Friday the 13th series to Paramount as part of a deal that would allow Warners to co-produce Interstellar. One week later, Derek Mears revealed that Paramount was working with Platinum Dunes to make a new installment "as fast as possible". David Bruckner was set to direct the next installment of Friday the 13th. Bruckner's original script was co-written with Ian Goldberg and Richard Naing and was a found footage film, as mandated by the studio. After altering the release date numerous times, Paramount set the film for a May 13, 2016 release date. TV writer Nick Antosca was announced to write the script in March 2015. Later in October, Paramount pushed back the film's release date to January 13, 2017. Two months later, Aaron Guzikowski was negotiating a deal to write a new script, but Bruckner, who had purportedly left the project in 2015, was no longer involved as a director. At the end of May 2016, Fuller revealed that the reboot would be an origin story for Jason, and his mother would be in the film. On August 8, Breck Eisner was in talks to direct the reboot. In September, Paramount pushed back the reboot's release date from January 13 to October 13, 2017.

The reboot's working title was reported as Friday the 13th: Part 13, Platinum Dunes was looking for someone to play a young Jason Voorhees, and production to begin in March, slated for October 13, 2017 release date. On February 6, Paramount officially canceled the project, due to the film Rings (2017) underperforming in the box office and the studio assigned the planned October release date to its then-upcoming film, Mother!. On October 10, Shannon and Swift revealed the title of their proposed sequel, Friday the 13th: Camp Blood – The Death of Jason Voorhees. The rights to the franchise reverted to New Line/Warners in 2018.

=== The CW: 2014–2015 ===
In April 2014, Emmett/Furla/Oasis Films and Crystal Lake Entertainment planned to produce an hour-long Friday the 13th television series. The series was intended to focus on a group of characters at Crystal Lake, who have to deal with the return of Jason Voorhees, as well as discover new information about him and his family. The series was being developed by The CW as of August 2015. Steve Mitchell and Craig Van Sickle were hired to write the plot, while Sean S. Cunningham, Randall Emmett, George Furla and Mark Canton were to be the executive producers, but one year later the network decided to not move forward with the series. The CW president Mark Pedowitz explained: "We had better pilots. The bottom line is we felt we had stronger things to go with, and we didn't go forward with it. It was well-written, it was darker than we wanted it to be, and we didn't believe it had sustainability... We didn't believe that it was a sustainable script, a sustainable series. It was a very good pilot, but not a sustainable series".

=== Lawsuit and other projects: 2018–2022 ===
Victor Miller, who wrote the original Friday the 13th screenplay, asserted that Horror Inc. derived its current copyright to the screenplay from Miller's transfer of copyright to Horror Inc.'s predecessor-in-interest, the Manny Company. Miller sent a Notice of Termination to Horror Inc. on January 26, 2016, purportedly reclaiming his rights to the screenplay and the content contained therein through termination of the transfer of rights he had formerly made to the Manny Company.

Original film producer Sean S. Cunningham claims that Miller wrote the screenplay for Friday the 13th as a work-made-for-hire for the Manny Company. Under copyright law, an employer is considered the statutory author and copyright holder if a work is made in the employee's scope of employment. If, as Cunningham contends, Miller wrote the screenplay as the Manny Company's employee, he never held a copyright to the screenplay to transfer or reclaim. A lawsuit seeking the parties' declaration of rights was filed in a federal court in Connecticut. On September 28, 2018, Miller won the rights against Cunningham. Cunningham appealed, the appeal was withdrawn due to technical reasons, and then reinstated by the deadline of April 12 the following year. The lawsuit was settled on December 29, 2021, with Miller retaining the U.S. domestic rights for the original screenplay and the character elements of the original film, including young Jason Voorhees, while Cunningham and his company Horror, Inc. retain the international rights and adult Jason Voorhees.

In October 2018, LeBron James and his production company SpringHill Entertainment (alongside Vertigo Entertainment) were in talks to co-produce the next film. A month later, screenwriter Clint Ford started writing a prequel screenplay for the franchise titled Friday the 13th: The Beginning. In July 2019, Tom McLoughlin, writer and director of Friday the 13th Part VI: Jason Lives, revealed that he authored a speculative script for a sequel film titled Jason Never Dies. McLoughlin confirmed the film would have served as a direct sequel to Jason Lives, ignoring the other films in the franchise. In 2022, McLoughlin also wrote another film with co-writer James Sweet which was a prequel to the 1980 film titled Diary of Pamela Voorhees.

== Literature ==
=== Novels ===
I couldn't believe it. He started writing this book with low expectations, but a few pages in, he was already enjoying himself. He'd found a way to tell the story in his own interesting way—with his own imprint—and he wrote the book in less than a week. Dad never wrote a book that he didn't like.

— David Avallone on his father's experience writing Friday the 13th Part 3

Six of the twelve films have been adapted into novels—Friday the 13th 1 – 3, Jason Lives, Jason X, and Freddy vs. Jason—with Friday the 13th Part 3 being adapted twice. The first novel was Michael Avallone's 1982 adaptation of Friday the 13th Part 3; Avallone had previously adapted Beneath the Planet of the Apes and Shock Corridor. The author chose to use an alternate ending, one that was filmed for Part 3 but never used, as the conclusion for his adaptation. In the alternate ending, Chris, who is in a canoe, hears her boyfriend Rick's voice and immediately runs back to the house. When she opens the door, Jason is standing there with a machete and kills her. The next book was not published until 1986, when Simon Hawke adapted Jason Lives. Hawke would also adapt the first three films into novels, and his adaptation of the original Friday the 13th was published in 1987, with novelizations of Part 2 and 3 both being published in 1988. Hawke's first adaptation, Jason Lives, introduced the character of Elias Voorhees, Jason's father, who was supposed to appear in the film before being cut by the studio. The book explains how Elias has Jason's body buried, instead of the planned cremation, after his death in The Final Chapter. A novelization of the first season of Crystal Lake, written by Tim Waggoner, was published by A24 on October 15, 2026.

In 1994, four young adult novels were released under the title of Friday the 13th. These stories focused on different people finding Jason's mask and becoming possessed by his spirit, but the actual character did not appear in the novels. The novels were written by author William Pattinson, under the pen name Eric Morse, and published in 1994. The books are titled Mother's Day, Jason's Curse, The Carnival, and Road Trip. In 2003 and 2005, Black Flame published novelizations of Freddy vs. Jason and Jason X. After the release of the Jason X novel, Black Flame began publishing two series of novels. One set was published under the Jason X title, while the second set used the Friday the 13th moniker. The Jason X series consisted of four sequels to the 2005 adaptation. The first to be published was Jason X: The Experiment, which saw the government attempting to exploit Jason's indestructibility to create an army of "super soldiers". The second novel, Planet of the Beast, follows the efforts of Dr. Bardox and his crew as they try to clone a comatose Jason and stay alive when Jason awakens. Death Moon revolves around Jason crash-landing at Moon Camp Americana, and the final novel, To the Third Power, is about the discovery of Jason underneath a prison.

The Friday the 13th series of novels are not connected to the Jason X series and do not continue any story set forth by the films. Instead, each novel developed the character of Jason in its own way. Friday the 13th: Church of the Divine Psychopath has Jason resurrected by a religious cult. In Friday the 13th: Hell Lake, a recently executed serial killer, Wayne Sanchez, persuades Jason to help him escape back to the real world. In Hate-Kill-Repeat, two religious serial killers attempt to find Jason at Crystal Lake, believing that the three of them share the same contempt for those that break the moral code. The Jason Strain places Jason on an island with a group of death row convicts—placed there by television executives running a reality game show—while a scientist attempts to create an age-retarding "super drug" from Jason's DNA. Instead, she creates a virus that reanimates the dead into zombies. The character of Pamela Voorhees returns from the grave in Carnival of Maniacs, and she searches for Jason, who is now part of a traveling sideshow and about to be auctioned off to the highest bidder.

=== Comic books ===
Since New Line Cinema's acquisition of the franchise, several Friday the 13th comic books have been published by Topps Comics, Avatar Press, and DC Comics imprint WildStorm. The first comic book release for the franchise was the 1993 Topps Comics adaptation of Jason Goes to Hell, written by Andy Mangels. The three-issue series was a condensed version of the film with a few added scenes. Topps Comics published another series in 1995, with Nancy A. Collins writing a three-issue, non‑canonical miniseries involving a crossover between Jason and The Texas Chainsaw Massacre's Leatherface — Jason vs. Leatherface. The story involves Jason stowing away aboard a train and eventually meeting Leatherface. The two initially become friends, with Leatherface adopting Jason into the former's family. After a series of misunderstandings, Jason and Leatherface turn on each other.

On May 13, 2005, New Line first exercised their rights to use the Friday the 13th moniker when they, along with Avatar comics, released an issue of Friday the 13th Special. Written by Brian Pulido and illustrated by Mike Wolfer and Greg Waller, the story takes place after the events of Freddy vs. Jason, where siblings Miles and Laura Upland inherit Camp Crystal Lake. Knowing that Jason caused the recent destruction, Laura, unknown to her brother, sets out to kill Jason with a paramilitary group so that she and her brother can sell the property. The issue pre‑sold more than 17,500 copies. Avatar released a three-issue miniseries titled Friday the 13th: Bloodbath in September 2005. The series was written by Brian Pulido, illustrated by Mike Wolfer and Andrew Dalhouse, and revolves around a group of teenagers who come to Camp Tomorrow, a camp near Crystal Lake, for work and a "party-filled weekend". The teenagers begin to discover that they share common family backgrounds and soon awaken Jason, who proceeds to kill them. Brian Pulido returned for a third time in October 2005 to write another special issue for Avatar, titled Jason X. Picking up after the events of the Jason X film, Jason is now on Earth II where a bioengineer, Kristen, attempts to subdue him in hopes that she can use his regenerative tissue to save her own life and the lives of those she loves. In February 2006, Avatar published a two-issue miniseries titled Friday the 13th: Jason vs. Jason X. The series was written and illustrated by Mike Wolfer. The story takes place after the events of the film Jason X, where a salvage team discovers the spaceship Grendel and awakens a regenerated Jason Voorhees. The "original" Jason and Uber-Jason, a version of Jason with mechanical limbs, are drawn into a battle to the death. In June 2006, Avatar's final Friday the 13th comic, a one-shot comic titled Friday the 13th: Fearbook, was released, written by Mike Wolfer with art by Sebastian Fiumara. In the comic, Jason is captured and experimented upon by the Trent Organization. Jason escapes and seeks out Violet, the survivor of Friday the 13th: Bloodbath, whom the Trent Organization is holding in their Crystal Lake headquarters.

In December 2006, WildStorm began publishing Friday the 13th comics, beginning with a six-issue miniseries that involves Jason's return to Crystal Lake, a lone survivor's tale of the murder of her friends by a monster, a new revelation about the evil surrounding Crystal Lake, and the truth of what Jason embodies. The miniseries pre‑sold approximately 60,318 copies altogether, with each issue pre‑selling 15,800, 9,600, 8,964, 8,637, 8,715 and 8,602 copies, respectively. The trade paperback of the series, released in September 2007, contained a foreword by musician Andrew W.K. On July 11 and August 15, 2007, WildStorm published a two-part special titled Friday the 13th: Pamela's Tale. The two-issue comic book covers Pamela Voorhees' journey to Camp Crystal Lake and the story of her pregnancy with Jason as she recounts it to hitchhiker Annie, a camp counselor who is killed in the original film. The miniseries pre‑sold a combined 16,051 copies.

I did about a 30-page treatment for the potential sequel, turned it in, and they all backed it. [...] After some time passed and the Ash thing had gone away [...] the New Line licensing guys started talking about doing it as a comic book. [...] while I was at New Line [...] I was trying to encourage it along as best I could, knowing [the comic] was the only way it was going to see the light of day.

— Jeff Katz on how the Freddy vs. Jason sequel became a comic

WildStorm released another comic book special, titled Friday the 13th: How I Spent My Summer Vacation, consisting of two issues that were released on September 12 and October 10, 2007. The comic book provides insight into the psychology of Jason Voorhees as he befriends a boy born with a skull deformity. The first issue of How I Spent My Summer Vacation pre‑sold approximately 7,837 copies. WildStorm released a six-issue sequel to Freddy vs. Jason, titled Freddy vs. Jason vs. Ash, starring the two aforementioned killers and Ash from the Evil Dead film series. The story focuses on Freddy using the Necronomicon, which is in the basement of the Voorhees home, to escape from Jason's subconscious and "gain powers unlike anything he's had before". Freddy attempts to use Jason to retrieve the book, but Ash, who is working at the local S‑Mart in Crystal Lake, learns of the book's existence and sets out to destroy it once and for all. The story, by Jeff Katz, was a sequel to the Freddy vs. Jason film in development before the former film had been theatrically released. After meeting with executives, the negotiations ended and the story was shelved. Following the success of Freddy vs. Jason, the idea of including Ash was brought up again, but New Line ultimately decided they would put the story in comic book form and bring in James Kuhoric to write and Jason Craig to do the artwork. On January 9 and February 13, 2008, WildStorm released another two-issue miniseries, titled Friday the 13th: Bad Land, which was written and illustrated by Ron Marz and Mike Huddleston, respectively. The series explores the history of Crystal Lake before Pamela and Jason Voorhees arrived. Bad Land takes place in two time frames, the "present day" and 250 years before "present day". It follows three hikers in the present and three fur trappers in the past, each of whom is snowed in by a blizzard at Crystal Lake. Each group experiences similar events, suggesting that there is a connection between the two groups. A one-shot comic, titled Friday the 13th: Abuser and the Abused, written by Joshua Hale Fialkov with artwork by Andy B., was released on April 30, 2008. The story involves a teenager named Maggie tricking her abusive boyfriend into travelling to Crystal Lake, where she plans to murder him, but she encounters Jason shortly after arriving at the camp. On June 24, 2009, the six-issue sequel to Freddy vs. Jason vs. Ash, subtitled The Nightmare Warriors, began. Written by Katz and James Kuhoric, and illustrated by Jason Craig, the miniseries has Ash and survivors of both Freddy and Jason banding together to defeat the two after Freddy is released from the world of the Deadites by government operatives who had discovered the Necronomicon.

== Other media ==
=== Video games ===
In May 1986, Domark released Friday the 13th: The Computer Game for the Amstrad CPC, Commodore 64, and ZX Spectrum. The plot involved the player picking a "sanctuary" and attempting to persuade others to hide there. Jason is "disguised as a friend" until he decides to attack the player. Three years later, LJN published a game for the Nintendo Entertainment System.

In 2006, HeroCraft with publisher MindMatics released the mobile game Friday the 13th: Road to Hell under license from New Line Cinema. In the same year Sammy released a pachinko machine CR Freddy vs. Jason based on the film. In 2007, Xendex released their own Friday the 13th game for mobile phones based on the first film. In the game, the player plays as one of the counselors at Camp Crystal Lake. While the staff is preparing the camp for its first summer weekend, an "unknown stalker" begins murdering each of them. The player must discover the truth and escape the camp alive.

Electronic Gaming Monthly announced in January 2015 that a new multi-platform survival horror game, labeled as an "asymmetrical, co-operative and competitive multiplayer predator/prey horror experience" was in development, with a tentative release date of October 2015. The game was developed by IllFonic and was originally going to be titled Slasher Vol. 1: Summer Camp until Gun Media joined and helped develop, in which they would publish the game. The game was raised through BackerKit and Kickstarter, with BackerKit collecting US$271,439.20 from 16,109 backers and Kickstarter collecting US$823,704.20 from 12,128 backers, collecting a total of US$1,095,143.40 from an overall 28,237 backers, with a confirmed title of Friday the 13th: The Game. A developer panel for Gun Media and IllFonic was opened at PAX South 2016 in January with alpha footage and a list of kill animations. The game was released digitally on May 26, 2017, before being released physically on October 13 that same year. Due to licensing issues with franchise creator Victor Miller, the game's servers were shut down in November 2020, though online play remained accessible via peer-to-peer matchmaking. The game was delisted at the end of 2023 due to the license expiring. On December 31, 2024, all online services were discontinued, leaving only offline modes available for play.

A mobile game available on iOS, Android and Steam, Friday the 13th: Killer Puzzle, was released on January 20, 2018. It has also been released on the Xbox One and PlayStation 4. In 2019, Hishijin released a pachinko machine Friday the 13th based on the 2009 reboot film.

A new video game alongside a new film, were announced to be in the works in July 2025.

Jason Voorhees appeared as a playable character in Mortal Kombat X, Mortal Kombat Mobile, MultiVersus, Call of Duty: Warzone, Call of Duty: Black Ops 6, Fortnite, and Dead by Daylight.

=== Mockumentary miniseries ===
The Crystal Lake Massacres Revisited is a three-episode mockumentary directed by Daniel Farrands which is exploring the Jason Voorhees murders at Crystal Lake with interviews from the local townsfolk, historians, skeptics and families of the victims who investigated or knew about the events of the first six films. It was released in 2009 as part of DVD Deluxe Editions Friday the 13th IV-VI.

=== Short film ===
A 13-minute short film titled Sweet Revenge, directed by Mike P. Nelson, was released on August 13, 2025, as part of the franchise's 45th anniversary and in conjunction with the Angry Orchard hard cider brand. Starring Ally Ioannides as Eve and Schuyler White as Jason, who went on to reprise his role in the 2027 film.

=== Merchandise ===
In addition to the films, television shows, and various literature based on the Friday the 13th franchise, there are over 100 licensed products that have grossed more than $125 million in revenue. Over the years, the characters of Friday the 13th have been marketed under various toy lines. In 1988, Screamin' Toys produced a model kit of Jason Voorhees. Six years later, Screamin' Toys issued a second model kit based on Jason's appearance in Jason Goes to Hell. Both kits are no longer in production. In 1998, as part of McFarlane Toys' Movie Maniacs 1 collection, a figure of Jason from Jason Goes to Hell was released. Jason was one of the three most popular figures sold from the Movie Maniacs 1 collection, and the other two were Freddy Krueger and Leatherface. The following year, 6 in (150 mm) scale models of Jason and Freddy in a glass display case were released by MacFarlane Toys. In 2002, as part of its Movie Maniacs 5 collection, McFarlane released a model of Über-Jason from Jason X. McFarlane did not release another Friday the 13th collectable until November 2006, when a 3-dimensional movie poster was released. Since 2002, there has been a steady production of action figures, dolls, and statuettes, with more merchandise tying into the film Freddy vs. Jason.

Apart from video games and toys, the series has also seen the release of its films' soundtracks. In 1982, Gramavision Records released an LP album of selected pieces of Harry Manfredini's scores from the first three films. On September 27, 2005, BSX Records released a limited edition CD of Fred Mollin's scores. On January 13, 2012, La-La Land Records released a limited edition 6-CD boxset containing Manfredini's scores from the first six films. Beginning with Jason Goes to Hell, each film in the series has had their musical score and soundtrack released for sale.

== Non-fiction works ==
=== Books ===
Cover of Crystal Lake Memories: The Complete History of Friday the 13th, a book on the Friday the 13th franchise

There have been two books released chronicling the making of the Friday the 13th films and one about making Friday the 13th: The Series—Curious Goods: Behind the Scenes of Friday the 13th: The Series. In February 2005, FAB Press published their book containing interviews with the cast and crew of the Friday the 13th series of films. David Grove, a film journalist who has written for Fangoria, Cinefantastique, and various other British magazines detailing the creation of the Friday the 13th films, wrote the comprehensive book, Making Friday the 13th: The Legend of Camp Blood. Grove interviewed over 100 "key personnel involved in making the films" to collect "detailed production histories of each of the 11 films", not including interviews with other film professionals like Wes Craven. Grove's book also includes previously unseen production photos which were acquired from private collections.

Eight months after the release of Grove's book, Titan Books, in association with Sparkplug Press, released a detailed history on the Friday the 13th series. Peter M. Bracke released Crystal Lake Memories: The Complete History of Friday the 13th on October 24, 2005. The book chronicles the creation of the series up to the release of Freddy vs. Jason. Bracke spent three years researching the series and collecting more than 200 interviews from the cast and crew of each of the films. Bracke's extensive work for the book prompted Sean S. Cunningham to provide a foreword. Crystal Lake Memories also includes images, storyboards, concept art, and publicity material that had not been released to the public. A private party was held on October 22 at Universal Studios CityWalk Hollywood for the book's premiere.

=== Documentaries ===
A documentary film, titled His Name Was Jason: 30 Years of Friday the 13th, was released in February 2009. This film was directed by Daniel Farrands, who had also written the film Halloween: The Curse of Michael Myers as well as a documentary on The Amityville Horror. The film was broadcast on the Starz television channel during the first week of February, and afterwards it was released on DVD on February 3, 2009. The documentary is hosted by special make-up effects artist Tom Savini, who interviews the cast and crew members of each of the Friday the 13th films, asking them questions on the choices they made during filming. It also features interviews with journalists and other filmmakers who offer their opinion of the series. Composer John Corlis wrote the music for the documentary and it was released digitally in 2018.

In September 2013, Farrands wrote and directed a second documentary film on the Friday franchise, Crystal Lake Memories: The Complete History of Friday the 13th, this time directly inspired by Bracke's book of the same name. This documentary discusses each of the twelve films, from the original to the 2009 reboot, as well as the first television series. It is narrated by Corey Feldman, and also features interviews with key individuals in the franchise's history. Farrands has suggested that his work on the well-received 2010 film, Never Sleep Again: The Elm Street Legacy, which documented the making of the Nightmare on Elm Street series, demonstrated the possibility for a documentary film that was more in depth and more comprehensive than his previous effort, His Name Was Jason. In making such a film, Farrands turned to Bracke's book, which he had also worked on, and drew from its structure and content. It grossed over $650,000 in home sales. Harry Manfredini wrote the music for the documentary and it was released on CD in October 2013.

A short four-episode documentary web series titled Friday the 13th: Camp Crystal Legacy, released between February and November 2026, to commemorate the franchise's 46th anniversary. Featuring the cast of the film series and composer Manfredini, and was directed by Michael Varrati. The series was only available at the Paramount Scares' YouTube channel.
