= Pamela Voorhees =

Fictional character in the Friday the 13th series

- Friday the 13th character
- Betsy Palmer as Pamela Voorhees in Friday the 13th (1980)
- First appearance: Friday the 13th (1980)
- Created by: Victor Miller
- Portrayed by: Betsy Palmer (1980 film and Part 2); Marilyn Poucher (Part III); Paula Shaw (Freddy vs. Jason); Nana Visitor (2009 film); Linda Cardellini (Crystal Lake)
- Voiced by: Jennifer Ann Burton

In-universe information
- Full name: Pamela Voorhees; Pamela Wittering (Crystal Lake); Pamela Scott (Crystal Lake)
- Alias: Mrs. Voorhees
- Occupation: Waitress (Crystal Lake); Singer (Crystal Lake)
- Spouse: Elias Voorhees
- Children: Jason Voorhees (son)
- Classification: Vengeful mass murderer; Camp Cook
- Primary location: Camp Crystal Lake, New Jersey
- Signature weapon: Bowie knife
- Status: Deceased: (1980 film & 2009 film); Alive: (Crystal Lake)

Pamela Voorhees (/ˈvɔːrhiːz/) is a fictional character and the overarching antagonist of the Friday the 13th series of horror films. She was created by Victor Miller, and first appeared in Sean S. Cunningham's Friday the 13th known only as Mrs. Voorhees, and remains an antagonistic presence in its sequels, in which she is seen mostly as a severed head or a figment of her son, Jason's, imagination, after he took over in Friday the 13th Part 2 (1981). In Friday the 13th Part III (1982), the character appears as a reanimated corpse in a hallucination, played by Marilyn Poucher. Paula Shaw played Pamela in the crossover Freddy vs. Jason (2003). According to Palmer in Friday the 13th Reunion, she was asked to reprise her role in the film, but turned it down after reading the script. Nana Visitor played Pamela in the 2009 reboot. Linda Cardellini portrayed a younger version of the character in the prequel television series Crystal Lake (2026).

In the original film, Pamela is introduced as the mother of Jason Voorhees, a boy who supposedly drowned in 1957 at Camp Crystal Lake due to the negligence of the staff, while Pamela was working there as a cook. After she has exacted revenge on those she blamed for her son's death, the camp is closed. Twenty-two years later, its new owner and a group of counselors attempt to re-open it. To ensure that the camp remains closed so no other children will ever suffer Jason's fate, the vengeful and psychotic Pamela stalks and kills them one by one but is ultimately decapitated by the sole survivor of her killing spree, Alice Hardy. After Jason is revealed to still be alive, he avenges his mother and later murders anyone who sets foot into Camp Crystal Lake and the surrounding woods area, guided by Pamela's spirit, which he hallucinates inside his head as urging him to kill.

== Appearances ==
=== Films ===
==== Friday the 13th (1980) ====
Pamela Voorhees during her killing spree

Pamela (whose maiden name is never revealed) was born in 1930 (as revealed in Friday the 13th: The Final Chapter). At age 15, Pamela became pregnant by a man named Elias Voorhees. Very little is known about their romance and short marriage, aside from the fact that Pamela kept a class ring which she wore on her ring finger of her left hand (as seen in several scenes in the first Friday the 13th film). On June 13, 1946, at age 16, she gave birth to a hydrocephalic boy and she named him Jason (as shown in Jason Goes to Hell: The Final Friday). Because of his condition, Pamela never sent him to school, and was extremely overprotective of him.

Pamela later got a job as a cook at Camp Crystal Lake through her acquaintances David and Louise Christy. On a fateful day in 1957, Jason, infuriated by the constant teasing and harassment from other children, snuck out of his cabin late at night to prove that he could swim. No counselors were watching him, as they were partying and having sex in one of the adult cabins. Jason was presumed dead by drowning, but his body was never found in the lake. When an investigation concluded that Jason's death was accidental, the camp resumed as scheduled.

After Jason's death, Pamela began to hear auditory hallucinations of her son telling her to kill those responsible for his demise. In 1958, a year after Jason's death, Pamela brutally murdered two counselors, Barry and Claudette, in cold blood, blaming them for allowing her son to drown. Camp Crystal Lake was closed after the murders and nicknamed "Camp Blood" by local residents. When the owners tried to re-open the camp in 1962, Pamela returned, poisoned the water, and set several fires, causing the camp to be closed once more (the first film establishes that the culprit behind these incidents was never found). At the time of these incidents, Pamela lived in a house that bordered Camp Crystal Lake, which allowed her to observe that the camp remained unattended.

In 1978, Steven "Steve" Christy inherited the property from his parents, who had reportedly died bankrupt and traumatized by the series of events. The younger Christy was confident that the camp could reopen, and spent nearly $25,000 and a good portion of the year hiring contractors to renovate the rundown summer camp in anticipation of the following summer. Steve hired seven young counselors: Annie Phillips, Alice Hardy, Bill Brown, Ned Rubenstein, Marcie Stanler, Jack Burrell, and Brenda Jones. On June 13, 1979, Steve had the counselors making final preparations on the property for its grand reopening, even after several ominous warnings of a death curse by the local residents. Steve's goal had been to appeal to inner-city families, offering their children an opportunity to spend a summer outdoors. Pamela, who does not want the camp re-opened for fear of another tragic accident, is enraged and goes on a savage killing spree: she slashes Annie's throat in the woods with her bowie knife, lures Ned inside a cabin to slit his throat, pierces Jack's throat with an arrow from underneath the bed, slams a felling axe into Marcie's face inside the bathroom stalls, and brutally attacks Brenda at the archery range. Prior to the killing spree, Steve had gone into town to procure supplies. Returning to the camp after a rain squall hit, Steve recognized Pamela and greeted her, surprised at seeing her so far out in the woods. Before Steve could make any other remarks, she stabbed him in the stomach.

Bill investigates the generator which has been turned off, and Pamela slits his throat before pinning his body with arrows to the shed door. With Alice as the last remaining counselor, she finds Bill's body and barricades herself in the main cabin. After terrorizing Alice by throwing Brenda's body into one of the windows, she drives her jeep towards the cabin to lure Alice out, thinking that Steve has returned. Outside, she greets the frightened Alice in a friendly manner and cites herself as a friend of Steve Christy. When she enters inside the cabin with Alice, she sees Brenda's body and begins to discuss about Jason's drowning in which she blames the counselors for not paying attention to his incident. As she begins to have visions of Jason's drowning, she turns violent and draws her bowie knife to attack Alice, but the surviving counselor strikes her with a fireplace poker. When Alice flees into the gun storage, Pamela violently slaps her before Alice stuns her by smacking the butt of a rifle into her face. As Pamela searches around the camp saying in Jason's voice "kill her, mommy!", she finds Alice hiding inside the pantry of the mess hall. When Pamela breaks parts of the door and tries to attack with a machete, Alice renders her unconscious with a frying pan. When she later awakes, she finds Alice at the shore and attacks her once again. During the struggle, Alice gains the upper hand. Pamela's last look is one of horror as Alice attacks Pamela with her own machete, which decapitates her.

==== Other films ====
Although Pamela does not share her son's later immortality, she does reappear in later films, as a corpse or a hallucination in Jason's mind urging him to kill. In Friday the 13th Part 2 (1981), Pamela's head is used by the revealed-to-be-alive Jason to scare Alice by placing it in her fridge, before killing her to avenge his mother's death. The head is later seen on a shrine built by Jason in his cabin, which also stores the rest of Pamela's body and those of some of Jason's victims. One of the few survivors of Jason's killing spree, Ginny Field, stumbles upon the cabin and dons Pamela's sweater to trick Jason into thinking she is his mother. When Ginny attempts to calm Jason down, he briefly visualizes his mother (again played by Betsy Palmer) talking to him, but then notices Pamela's head on the shrine and sees through the deception. Despite this, Ginny is ultimately able to escape from Jason and injure him with his machete.

Pamela is seen again in Friday the 13th Part III (1982) when lone survivor Chris Higgins has a nightmare which ends with Pamela's corpse (played by the Second Assistant Director, Marilyn Poucher), with her head attached, reaching up from the lake to pull her underwater. Pamela's grave briefly appears in Friday the 13th: The Final Chapter (1984). Pamela's final appearance in the original series is in Freddy vs. Jason (2003), where she is played by Paula Shaw. While in Hell, Jason sees his mother commanding her son to come back to life and kill the children of Elm Street. However, it is quickly revealed that "Pamela" was actually Freddy Krueger in disguise, trying to manipulate Jason for his own ends. Jason is notably furious when the deception is revealed.

Pamela (played by Nana Visitor) has a minor presence in the 2009 Friday the 13th reboot. The opening scene shows her chasing a young girl, presumably Alice, at the end of her Camp Crystal Lake killing spree, who ultimately decapitates Pamela with her own machete. The event is witnessed by a young Jason, who later examines his mother's corpse and finds a locket containing pictures of him and a younger Pamela, before hearing her voice commanding him to "kill for Mother." As an adult, Jason kidnaps one of his potential victims, Whitney Miller, who resembles the young Pamela seen in the picture, setting the film's events into motion.

In an interview, John Carl Buechler revealed he had originally intended to have a scene in Friday the 13th Part VII: The New Blood in which protagonist Tina Shepard has a surreal vision in which Pamela's severed head appears in Jason's arms, repeatedly yelling "help me mommy!" The scene was never shot, due to being deemed too over-the-top. Reportedly, the character was to make another appearance for Jason Goes to Hell: The Final Friday in a flashback. Jason X was originally meant to feature an appearance of Pamela in the holographic projection of Camp Crystal Lake that Jason is distracted by in the film. One idea was to even have Jason attack the virtual Pamela to show just how evil he had become.

=== Television series ===
On March 24, 2025, it was announced that actress Linda Cardellini would be appearing as a younger version of Pamela Voorhees in the Peacock series Crystal Lake, served as a prequel to the Friday the 13th film series. The series premiered on October 15, 2026.

=== Literature ===
The cover of Friday the 13th: Pamela's Tale #1, which reveals much of Pamela's early life, such as her pregnancy with her son Jason

The severed head of Pamela Voorhees is a major character in the first book of Eric Morse's Camp Crystal Lake series. In the novel, hunter Joe Travers finds an unmarked gravestone in the forest and digs nearby to find a wet cardboard box containing the still living head, having been reanimated by Jason's cursed mask. Pamela then gives him directions to the location of Jason's buried hockey mask, which he digs up and puts on, thus becoming possessed by Jason in the process. Carly, the novel's heroine, later discovers the head still in its box, still in the grave. During the final showdown with Pamela and the hunter, she destroys the head with a shotgun blast, killing Pamela.

In the non-canonical Jason vs. Leatherface comic miniseries by Topps Comics, Mrs. Voorhees is identified as Doris and appears in two flashbacks, one in the first issue and another in the second. In the first flashback, brought on by Jason being asked his name by Cook, she appears, face obscured, encouraging a young Jason as he writes his name on a chalkboard. The second flashback, provoked by Jason seeing the Hitchhiker abuse his younger brother Leatherface, has her killing Elias Voorhees with a machete when he attempts to beat Jason.

The comic one-shot Jason X Special by Avatar Press features Pamela coming back from the dead by possessing a swarm of nano ants. Discovering Jason has been captured by a bio-engineer named Kristen, Pamela releases him and guides him to a camp near Kristen's laboratory populated by androids, who Jason begins to destroy, quickly becoming dissatisfied with these victims due to the fact that, as Pamela states, "they aren't real." At the end of the comic, Pamela, after Jason is launched into space by Kristen, gets revenge on the bio-engineer by possessing her lover Neil and forcing him to stab Kristen in the stomach and slit his own throat. In the sequel to the one-shot, the two-issue miniseries Friday the 13th: Jason vs. Jason X, Pamela appears only as a fragmented memory shared between Jason and his clone (which was created using a portion of Jason's brain). After Jason disposes of his clone and assimilates the portion of his brain it possessed, his memories of Pamela (who he and the clone did not recognize) are restored.

In the novel Jason X: Death Moon by Black Flame, a character, while in a holographic version of Crystal Lake, stumbles across an underwater recreation of Pamela's grave in the lake and is attacked by a zombified version of her created by Dr. Armando Castillo. In Friday the 13th: Hell Lake, the character Gretchen Andrews, after an encounter with Jason, seemingly becomes possessed by Pamela. Friday the 13th: Carnival of Maniacs involves Pamela possessing characters who come into contact with her severed head.

In 2007, a two issue comic miniseries titled Friday the 13th: Pamela's Tale, detailing much of Pamela's history, was printed by Wildstorm. The comics take place before the main events of Friday the 13th and feature Pamela picking up Annie, one of the Camp Crystal Lake counselors in-training, and recounting her past. She reveals that Elias abused her while she was pregnant, which may have caused Jason to be born deformed. Driven by what she believed to be the unborn Jason's voice, Pamela killed Elias with an axe, blew up their trailer and dumped her husband's body in Crystal Lake. After killing Elias, Pamela moved to Crystal Lake and got a job as a chef at a diner, later being hired as Camp Crystal Lake's cook by the Christy family. After telling Annie her origin Pamela, as in the film, slits her throat, but treats her body as if it were still alive afterwards. The miniseries ends with a recreation of the scene from the film where Pamela meets Alice at Camp Crystal Lake. In the two-issue miniseries Friday the 13th: How I Spent My Summer Vacation, Pamela appears in a flashback to when she first brought Jason to Camp Crystal Lake in the first issue and the end of the second issue has Jason visiting his mother's grave.

In the first issue of the six-issue comic book miniseries Freddy vs. Jason vs. Ash, in a dream of Jason's, Freddy Krueger creates a vision of Pamela and uses it to manipulate Jason into seeking out the Necronomicon that is in the house that he and Pamela lived in when he was a child, as seen in the movie Jason Goes To Hell: The Final Friday. In the fifth issue of the miniseries, in addition to there being a portrait of Pamela in her and Jason's old house, it is implied that she used the Necronomicon to resurrect Jason after he drowned in Crystal Lake.

== Other media ==
Pamela also appears in the Friday The 13th video game for the NES. Her severed head is a mini-boss in a hidden cave. It floats around after lifting itself off a pedestal surrounded by candles, reminiscent of the second movie. Just as Jason has to be defeated three times to complete the game, Pamela can also be fought three times, and each defeat earns the player a unique item — a powerful weapon (usually a machete or axe), then her sweater, and finally the pitchfork.

In the 2017 video game Friday The 13th: The Game, Pamela (whether it's the real Pamela or a figment of Jason's imagination is unknown), voiced by Jennifer Ann Burton, tells Jason to kill the camp counselors that have come to Camp Crystal Lake. In the game, there are two series of unlockable audio tapes, one of which follows Pamela after Jason's drowning, and the other of which follows Tommy Jarvis after the events of the fourth, fifth, and sixth films of the Friday The 13th film series. Pamela's tapes offer background information on Pamela and Jason's life before the latter's drowning, revealing that Jason was not actually the son of Elias Voorhees, but the product of a brutal rape by an unknown stranger. Pamela and Jason were heavily abused by Elias, culminating in Pamela murdering her husband. When questioned by the police on the murder, Pamela claims that she did on Jason's urging. The tapes also feature a brief, friendly exchange between Pamela and Dr. Malcolm Jarvis, the father of Jason's future nemesis Tommy Jarvis, who sympathizes with Pamela. Over the course of the tapes, Pamela becomes increasingly errant and vicious as the police's apathy towards her plight becomes more apparent, culminating in the search for her son being dropped altogether and her being removed from the premises. As she is taken away, she ferociously declares that Crystal Lake now has "death curse", igniting the town's bloody history.

Action figures of Pamela have been released by both Sideshow Collectibles and NECA.

Pamela's grief and homicidal rage are the subject of "Pamela," the third track on the 2022 album God's Country by Oklahoma City noise rock band Chat Pile.

== Casting ==
Crystal Lake showrunner Brad Caleb Kane said Linda Cardellini was his first choice to portray Pamela in the series, recalling her as "very excited about the possibility of taking on such a massive character in the horror pantheon, and she looked at the twists and turns of the story and found her own unique way in". They considered recreating Betsy Palmer's hairstyle from the 1980 film, "but in the end it felt like cosplay." Cardellini said of Pamela, "There is a rage in her that has not been in any other character that I have found. There's a few moments where I'm punching, hitting, screaming, and crying, that almost is like scream therapy." She was also surprised by some of the plot elements of the series.

== Reception ==
In 2016, Dread Central ranked Pamela in fifth place on their Top 5 Most Powerful Performances in Horror History Since 1960! list, opining that Pamela encompassed both false compassion and blind rage and Palmer made the most of every second she appeared onscreen in the original film. Empire ranked Pamela as the 92nd best horror movie character, bemoaning that she was never resurrected and calling her "much more interesting than her son, Jason".

Cardellini received acclaim for her portrayal of Pamela in Crystal Lake.
