= Friday the 13th: Carnival of Maniacs =

2006 novel by Stephen Hand

- Author: Stephen Hand
- Language: English
- Series: Friday the 13th
- Release number: 5
- Genre: Horror
- Publisher: Black Flame (UK); Simon & Schuster (US)
- Publication date: 6 June 2006
- Publication place: United Kingdom
- Media type: Print (Paperback)
- Pages: 414
- ISBN: 9781844163809
- OCLC: 220038585
- Preceded by: Friday the 13th: The Jason Strain

Friday the 13th: Carnival of Maniacs is a 2006 British horror novel written by Stephen Hand and published by Black Flame. A tie-in to the Friday the 13th series of American horror films, it is the fifth and final installment in a series of five Friday the 13th novels published by Black Flame and involves undead killer Jason Voorhees being placed on display as a sideshow attraction by Doktor Geistmann's Carnival of Terror.

== Plot ==
Undead killer Jason Voorhees, weakened after his battle with supernatural killer Freddy Krueger, falls into a coma and is found by the Grissoms, inbred cannibals who live in the backwoods of Jason's hunting ground, Crystal Lake. Elsewhere, a trio of teenage goths in search of Camp Crystal Lake stumble on to Jason's abandoned shack, which contains the head of Jason's mother, Pamela. Pamela's spirit possesses one of the teens, Gloria Sowici, and exposes the head to moonlight, rousing Jason. Jason slaughters the Grissoms and Glo's friends, Trick and Z-Moll, but falls comatose again when Glo passes out atop Pamela's head, shielding it from the moon, after she and Jason are accidentally hit by an RV belonging to Doktor Geistmann's Carnival of Terror. Jason is mistaken for dead by the carnival's owners, George Arthur Witney and his drunk and disgruntled daughter, Alice Jane Witney, who decide to make Jason the new star attraction of the Carnival of Terror. Glo's suicide attempt to thwart Pamela fails, with Pamela taking permanent possession of Glo's body to go in search of Jason. Jason's condition will be cured if Pamela helps him commit murder on the upcoming Friday the 13th.

Also looking for Jason is Michelle Kyler, an FBI agent and paranormal investigator who believes her mother was murdered by Jason. Kyler, put on leave due to her unsanctioned solo takedown of a murderous Vodou cult, receives backing to search for Jason from Nathaniel Morgas, a multimillionaire obsessed with all things Voorhees. During Jason's premiere as the Carnival of Terror's newest star, Pamela wakes him up by exposing her head to moonlight, sparking a massacre in which dozens are killed, including George. After Jason murders Pamela, having failed to recognize her in Glo's body, he falls inert again and is put up for sale on the Internet by Alice. A bidding war erupts between Morgas and Ross Feratu, a shock rocker similarly obsessed with Jason. Ross wins the auction with an illegal bid blocker and draws up plans to use Jason as a prop for a televised performance to be held on Friday the 13th. Kyler, having acquired Pamela's head, makes a deal with Pamela to find Jason before being betrayed by her partner Cory Tolleson, who takes her to Morgas.

As Morgas and Tolleson torture Kyler for information about the connection between Pamela's head and Jason, Tolleson, having partially overheard Kyler's conversation with Pamela, realizes the moon is the key; he exposes the head to moonlight, prompting Jason to wake up during Ross's show and butcher everyone present, curing his condition and making it so he no longer needs the moonlight-derived power channeled into him by Pamela. After Pamela reveals Kyler's mother was murdered by the Grissoms, not Jason, the dying Kyler allows Pamela to possess her and kill Morgas and Tolleson. Jason and Pamela begin making their way back to Crystal Lake while Alice relaxes in the Caribbean with the five million she received from Ross.

== Reception ==
Don D'Ammassa, in a review written for Chronicle, deemed Carnival of Maniacs a "not entirely serious extension of the series" that benefitted from "a wry sense of humor." Rod Lott of Bookgasm felt the "crazy" novel was a "lovably over-the-top gorefest" that, despite not being scary, was ultimately "critic-proof, because it's intended only for F13 fans, and they're going to enjoy it."
