= Victor Miller (writer) =

American writer (1940–2026)

- Born: Victor Brooke Miller; May 14, 1940; New Orleans, Louisiana, U.S.
- Died: August 31, 2026 (aged 86); Alameda, California, U.S.
- Occupations: Actor, film writer
- Years active: 1968–2026
- Spouse: Elizabeth Thurston (m. 1962)
- Website: victormiller.com

Victor Brooke Miller (May 14, 1940 – August 31, 2026) was an American writer for film and television. He was best known for his screenplay of the original Friday the 13th film, the popularity of which spawned a long series of sequels. Miller was not involved with any of the sequels, though he remains credited with creating the characters of Jason Voorhees, his mother Pamela Voorhees, and the heroine Alice Hardy.

Miller also wrote for several daytime television series, for which won three Daytime Emmy Awards. His television work includes Guiding Light, One Life to Live, Another World, and All My Children. Much of his tenure of several shows were working under head writer Megan McTavish.

== Early life ==
Miller was born in New Orleans, Louisiana, on May 14, 1940, the son of John Dabney and Barbara Leovy Miller. He attended Milton Academy in Milton, Massachusetts, and Yale in New Haven, Connecticut, where he said he took every creative writing course offered. Beginning in 1962, he worked in television programming for a year with Stuart Erwin, Lee Rich, Irwin Segelstein, and Philip Capice at Benton & Bowles Advertising in New York City. He co-founded the American Shakespeare Theatre's Center for Theatre Techniques in Education and attended Herbert Berghof's playwriting class in New York City.

== Career ==
Friday the 13th was Miller's most successful film, grossing $59,754,601 worldwide on a very low budget of $550,000. The original is the only one of the series that had Miller's involvement; it grew into a long series of sequels and became the highest grossing horror franchise in the United States, earning a worldwide total of $465,239,523.

Miller said he had not seen any of the other Friday the 13th films because he did not approve of Jason Voorhees being the killer rather than Jason's mother as she was in the original. Miller was involved in a protracted lawsuit to gain the rights to the first Friday the 13th film. The issue turned on whether Miller's was a "work for hire", resolved on September 30, 2021, when the United States Court of Appeals for the Second Circuit decided otherwise; consequently, Miller had the right to terminate rights to his work. For Copyright Act purposes, as a screenwriter, Miller was an independent contractor of the film production company (Manny, Inc.) in 1979, when Miller wrote the screenplay (the film was released in 1980). The court concluded that copyright law, not labor law, controlled the "work for hire" determination, and thus affirmed the district court's grant of summary judgment to Miller.

He adapted two novels into films: A Stranger Is Watching by Mary Higgins Clark was adapted into the 1982 film of the same name and the 1967 young adult novel The Black Pearl by Scott O'Dell into the 1977 film of the same name. His horror film Rock, Paper, Scissors was released in 2017 and he had co-written the script for the horror thriller Eden Falls.

== Personal life ==
Miller was the third of four children. He married Elizabeth (Tina) Couzens Thurston in 1962. He had two children.

== Death ==
Miller died due to Alzheimer's disease in Alameda, California, on August 31, 2026, at the age of 86.

== Filmography ==
=== Film ===
Year	Title	Writer	Notes
1977	The Black Pearl	Yes	
1978	Here Come the Tigers	Yes	As Arch McCoy
1978	Manny's Orphans	Yes	
1980	Friday the 13th	Yes	
1982	A Stranger Is Watching	Yes	
2017	Rock, Paper, Scissors	Yes	

=== Television ===
Years held	Title	Position held	Notes	Ref.
1982–1984	One Life to Live	Associate head writer		
1984–1986; 1987–1989, 1997–2001, 2003–2006	All My Children	Associate head writer		
1986–1987; 1995–1997	Guiding Light	Associate head writer		
1990–1995	Another World	Associate head writer		
2001–2002	General Hospital	Associate head writer		

=== As producer ===
Year	Title	Role	Notes	Ref.
2011	Close Encounter of Mahjong	Executive		
2017	Rock, Paper, Scissors	Yes		
2025	Sweet Revenge	Executive	Short film	
2026	Crystal Lake	Executive	Posthumous release; 8 episodes	

=== Acting roles ===
Year	Title	Role	Notes	Ref.
1978	Manny's Orphans	Vice Principal		
2009	His Name Was Jason: 30 Years of Friday the 13th	Himself	Documentary film	
2013	Crystal Lake Memories: The Complete History of Friday the 13th	Himself	Documentary film	
2017	Rock, Paper, Scissors	Man in Overalls	Uncredited	
2022	The Once and Future Smash	Himself		

== Bibliography ==
Miller was the author of several books titled, Telly Savalas Kojak in a numbered series. The books were published in New York by Pocket Books between 1974 through 1975. Several reprints were published by Star Books in the U.K. without the series number, but with same title. The series:

- 1974, Kojak #1: Siege
- 1974, Kojak #2: Requiem for a Cop
- 1975, Kojak #3: Girl in the River
- 1975, Kojak #4: Therapy in Dynamite
- 1975, Kojak #5: Death Is Not a Passing Grade
- 1975, Kojak #6: A Very Deadly Game
- 1975, Kojak #7: Take-Over
- 1975, Kojak #8: Gun Business
- 1975, Kojak #9: The Trade-off

Other books:

- 1976, Fernanda, Pocket Books
- 1978, Hide The Children, Ballantine Books
- 1978, Giving In To Get Your Way: The attack-tics system for winning your everyday battles, Delacorte Press
- 1979, Toga Party, Fawcett Books
- 1979, The Glory Sharer, Jove Books
- 1981, Angel's Blood, Playboy Press
- 1981, The Book Of Worries: Hundreds of Horrible Things that Can Happen to You, Warner Books
- 1983, Windborne, Bantam Books
- 1993, Aikido In Everyday Life: Giving In to Get Your Way, North Atlantic Books, Berkeley, California Reprint of 1978 with Terry Dobson co-author.
- American Dynasty (3 volumes), Dell Books

== Awards and nominations ==
=== Daytime Emmy Awards ===
==== Nominations ====
- (1990, 1999, 2001, 2002 & 2004; Best Writing; All My Children)
- (1994 & 1996; Best Writing; Another World)
- (1983; Best Writing; One Life to Live)

==== Wins ====
- (1985, 1988 & 1998; Best Writing; All My Children)

=== Writers Guild of America Award ===
==== Nominations ====
- (1989 & 1999 Season; All My Children)
- (1997 Season; Guiding Light)
- (1993-1995 Season; Another World)

==== Wins ====
- WIN (1998, 2000, 2001 & 2003 Season; All My Children)
