= List of A Nightmare on Elm Street media =

A Nightmare on Elm Street refers to installments in the A Nightmare on Elm Street film series, an American horror franchise beginning with the 1984 film, A Nightmare on Elm Street, and based on the fictional character Freddy Krueger, who stalks teenagers in their dreams and kills them. Most media within the franchise include the phrase, "A Nightmare on Elm Street", as part of their title.

Installments in the franchise include:

== Films ==
Film	Year
A Nightmare on Elm Street	1984
A Nightmare on Elm Street 2: Freddy's Revenge	1985
A Nightmare on Elm Street 3: Dream Warriors	1987
A Nightmare on Elm Street 4: The Dream Master	1988
A Nightmare on Elm Street 5: The Dream Child	1989
Freddy's Dead: The Final Nightmare	1991
Wes Craven's New Nightmare	1994
Freddy vs. Jason	2003
A Nightmare on Elm Street	2010

== Other media ==
- Freddy's Nightmares, a TV series spun-off from the film series. It ran for 44 episodes from 1988 to 1990.
- A Nightmare on Elm Street comics, including various series published beginning in 1989. Among them were Freddy vs. Jason vs. Ash and Freddy vs. Jason vs. Ash: The Nightmare Warriors.
- All of the Elm Street films except for the 2010 remake received novelizations. Original Elm Street-related novels include an anthology Freddy Krueger’s Seven Sweetest Dreams released in 1991 by Futura Press, the Freddy Krueger’s Tales of Terror series published in 1994-1995 by Tor Books (its entries are "Blind Date", "Fatal Games", "Virtual Terror", "Twice Burned", "Help Wanted", and "Deadly Disguise"), and a series of novels published by Black Flame in 2005 and 2006 ("Suffer the Children", "Dreamspawn", "Protégé", "Perchance to Dream", and "The Dream Dealers").
- A Nightmare on Elm Street video game, also published in 1989. Freddy Krueger has also appeared in the 2011 Mortal Kombat game, the mobile version of Mortal Kombat X, and Dead by Daylight.
- The documentaries Never Sleep Again: The Elm Street Legacy, I Am Nancy, Nightmares in the Makeup Chair, and Scream, Queen! My Nightmare on Elm Street.
