= Protégé (disambiguation) =

A protégé is an apprentice or recipient of mentoring.

Protégé may refer to:

== Art, entertainment, and media ==
- Protégé (comics), a fictional Marvel Comics character
- A Nightmare on Elm Street: Protégé, a 2005 novel by Tim Waggoner
- Protégé (TV series), a Philippine reality-based talent search television show created by GMA Network
- Protégé (film) (Moon To), a 2007 Hong Kong film
- The Protégé, a 2021 U.S. film

== History ==
- Protégé system in Morocco, in which protégés were individuals associated with foreign consuls and given special privileges and protections

== Brands and enterprises ==
- Protégé (restaurant), a restaurant in Palo Alto, California, U.S.
- Protégé (software), a free, open source ontology editor and a knowledge acquisition system
- Mazda Protegé, known variously as the Familia, 323, Mizer, GLC, Astina, Etude, etc.
- Grupo Protege, a Brazilian private security company
- Protégé Partners, a U.S. hedge fund investment firm
- Protégé Corporation, a team and company from the first season of the U.S. version of The Apprentice

== See also ==
- Toshiba Portégé, laptop computer
