= Fiends of the Eastern Front =

Comic by Gerry Finley-Day and Carlos Ezquerra

- Cover of Fiends of the Eastern Front (2005), hardcover collected edition, art by Carlos Ezquerra
- Created by: Gerry Finley-Day; Carlos Ezquerra

Publication information
- Publisher: IPC; Rebellion Developments
- Schedule: Weekly; Monthly
- Title(s): 2000 AD #152-161; Judge Dredd Megazine #245-252
- Formats: Original material for the series has been published as a strip in the comics anthology(s) 2000 AD and Judge Dredd Megazine.
- Genre: War; Vampire
- Publication date: February–April 1980; May–December 2006

Creative team
- Writer(s): Gerry Finley-Day; David Bishop
- Artist(s): Carlos Ezquerra; Colin MacNeil
- Letterer(s): Jack Potter; Colin MacNeil; Ellie de Ville
- Editor(s): Steve MacManus; Matt Smith

Reprints
- Collected editions
- Fiends of the Eastern Front: ISBN 1-904265-64-2

Fiends of the Eastern Front was a story published in the British comics anthology 2000 AD, created by Gerry Finley-Day and Carlos Ezquerra. The series mixed vampires into the general horror of the Eastern front.

== Plot ==
A diary found with an unearthed skeleton casts new light on a lost piece of history from World War II. It belongs to a young German soldier who was stationed on the Eastern Front alongside a group of Romanian soldiers who always fought at night. Their true nature is soon revealed and when they change sides all Hell breaks loose.

== Characters ==
=== German ===
- Hans Schmitt - The main protagonist
- Karl Mueller - Hans' friend
- Inspector Brandt - A police officer in 1980 Germany

=== Russian ===
- The Rabbi - An unnamed rabbi who performs the ritual
- The Golem - Created by the Rabbi to destroy Costanza and his Vampyr
- Jesf Charnosov - A member of SMERT KROFPEET

=== The Vampyr (Blood Pack) ===
- Hauptmann Costanza - Vampire leader
  - Colonel Grant - An alias of Costanza's
- Corporal Gorgo - Costanza's chief lieutenant
- Corporal Cringu - Costanza's loyal thrall
- Fourteen other unnamed Vampyr followers

== Bibliography ==
They have appeared in their own series (the original run being released as a single volume by Rebellion Developments in June 2006 and a new series starting to coincide with this) as well as cropping up elsewhere and now feature in a series of novels.

=== Comics ===
- Fiends of the Eastern Front:
  - "Fiends of the Eastern Front", written by Gerry Finley-Day, art by Carlos Ezquerra, in 2000 AD #152-161, February–April 1980 (collected in hardcover, June 2006, ISBN 1-904265-64-2)
  - "Stalingrad", written by David Bishop, art by Colin MacNeil, in Judge Dredd Megazine #245-252, May–December 2006
  - "1812", written by Ian Edginton, art by Dave Taylor, in 2000 AD #2100–2105, September 2018
  - "Fiends of the Western Front", written by Ian Edginton, art by Tiernen Trevallion, in 2000 AD #2111–2115, December 2018 - January 2019
  - "Costanta", written by Ian Edginton, art by Tiernen Trevallion, in 2000 AD #2201-2211, September-December 2020
  - "1963" written by Ian Edginton, art by Tiernen Trevallion, in 2000 AD #2273-2285, March-June 2022
  - "Fiends of West Berlin", written by Karl Stock, art by Warren Pleese, in 2000 AD Sci-Fi Special 2022
  - "Fiends of the Western Front: Wilde West", written by Ian Edginton, art by Warren Pleese in 2000 AD #2310, November 2022

==== Cameo appearances in other series ====
- Judge Dredd: "Helter Skelter" (with Garth Ennis; Carlos Ezquerra (1-7, 10-12) and Henry Flint (8-9), in 2000 AD #1250-1261, 2001)
- The Scarlet Apocrypha: "Red Menace" (with Dan Abnett and Carlos Ezquerra, in Judge Dredd Megazine #4.17, 2002)
- Fodder (with Hannah Berry and Dani K, in 2000AD Free Comic Book Day 2016)

=== Novels ===
Black Flame released a series of novels based on the series, all written by David Bishop:

- Fiends of the Eastern Front:
  - Operation Vampyr (December 2005 ISBN 1-84416-274-5)
  - The Blood Red Army (April 2006, ISBN 1-84416-325-3)
  - Twilight of the Dead (August 2006, ISBN 1-84416-384-9)
  - Fiends of the Rising Sun (July 2007, ISBN 1-84416-494-2)

The first three books were collected in one volume, Fiends of the Eastern Front (672 pages, February 2007, ISBN 1-84416-455-1)

The novel Fiends of the Rising Sun deals with the same premise but with vampire samurai in the Pacific War.

== See also ==
- American Gothic, another 2000 AD story which features vampires

Other items that mix horror with the World Wars and/or feature undead Nazis include:

- The Keep
- The Bloody Red Baron
- Return to Castle Wolfenstein
- The Wolf's Hour
- Shock Waves
- Oasis of the Zombies
- Zombie Lake
- Deathwatch
- Hellsing
- The Bunker
- 30 Days of Night: Red Snow
- Dead Snow
