= Natasha Rhodes =

English-born author (born 1978)

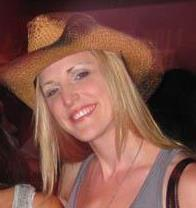
- Rhodes at Comicon, California
- Born: 8 April 1978 (age 48); Kent, England
- Occupation: Novelist
- Writing career
- Period: 2004–present
- Genres: Dark Urban Fantasy, Paranormal romance, Action, Adventure, Horror
- Notable works: Blade: Trinity, A Nightmare on Elm Street: Perchance to Dream, Dante's Girl
- Website: natasharhodes.com

Natasha Rhodes (now Natasha Rohner) (born 8 April 1978) is an English author, best known for her contemporary fantasy book series starring supernatural crime-fighter Kayla Steele. She has also written novelisations of films include Blade: Trinity and the Final Destination series of movies, as well as original books based on films such as the A Nightmare on Elm Street series.

== Personal life ==
Rhodes was born in Kent, England in 1978. Her education includes a BA Honors degree from the University of Wales, Newport. She was involved in the post-production of cult Indie hit Cop on the Edge IX: A Prelude to Justice, a spoof produced by Coten Films and directed by Edward Keaton.

Rhodes currently lives in Orange County, California, with her husband Criss 6, former bassist of glam metal band Pretty Boy Floyd and Mötley Crüe tribute band True 2 Crue.

== Works ==
After graduating from the University of Wales, Rhodes was hired to write official film novelisations for Black Flame, an imprint of BL Publishing, the publishing arm of UK gaming giant Games Workshop.

Between 2004 and 2010, Rhodes penned eight original novels and movie-based novelisations for BL Publishing to support her post-university travels around America. Inspired by the colorful local characters she met in Hollywood, she wrote her first original novel Dante's Girl at the age of 28, the first part of a three-book series following the life of supernatural crime-fighter Kayla Steele. Her supernatural trilogy was set on the streets of Los Angeles and was published by Solaris Books, an imprint which focuses on science fiction, fantasy and dark fantasy novels and anthologies to showcase both established and new authors. The series was distributed to the U.K. and U.S. booktrade via local divisions of Simon & Schuster.

Her short horror story Crazy Train, set in the world of the Los Angeles heavy metal scene, was published as part of an anthology of new horror writers in The End of the Line: An Anthology of Underground Horror by Rebellion Books.

Rhodes currently works at BlackBerry Limited as Principal Threat Research Publisher of two digital publications: ThreatVector, an award-winning cybersecurity blog, and PHI Magazine, BlackBerry's bi-annual print publication focusing on the past, present and future of artificial intelligence and machine learning in the information security industry.

She was credited as a contributor/editor of the first non-fiction book produced by the cyber division of the company, Finding Beacons In The Dark: A Guide to Cyber Threat Intelligence, a practical guide to cyber threat hunting.

== Bibliography ==
=== Kayla Steele series ===
- Dante's Girl (2007) ISBN 1-84416-666-X
- The Last Angel (2008) ISBN 1-84416-577-9
- Circus of Sins (2010) ISBN 978-1-906735-73-9

=== Official Movie Novelizations ===
- Blade: Trinity (2004) ISBN 1-84416-106-4
- Final Destination: Dead Reckoning (2005) ISBN 1-84416-170-6
- Final Destination I: The Movie (2006) ISBN 1-84416-317-2
- Final Destination II: The Movie (2006) Co-written with Nancy A. Collins. ISBN 1-84416-318-0
- A Nightmare on Elm Street: Perchance to Dream (2006) ISBN 1-84416-322-9

=== Short stories ===
- The End of the Line: An Anthology of Underground Horror (2010) Contributor of Short Story: "Crazy Train." ISBN 978-1-907519-33-8

=== Non-Fiction ===
- Finding Beacons In The Dark: A Guide to Cyber Threat Intelligence (2021) Co-written with the BlackBerry Threat Research and Intelligence team. (Contributor/Editor)

== Interviews ==
- SciFi Blog interview with Natasha about the portrayal of women in fantasy books
- Interview with Natasha Rhodes on ScifiChick.com
- Interview on Author David H. Burton's popular blog 'Random Musings'
- Natasha Rhodes interviewed about 'Circus Of Sins' on Mookychick.com
- Barnes and Nobel Review of 'Circus of Sins'
- Kayla Steele Series Review
