= Matt Smith (comics editor) =

British editor and author (born 1972)

- Matt Smith, photographed at Bristol UK Comics Festival, 2004, holding a copy of small press comics magazine FutureQuake
- Born: Matthew Joseph Ratcliffe Smith; 31 October 1972 (age 54)
- Area: Editor
- Notable works: 2000 AD; Judge Dredd Megazine
- Awards: "Favourite Editor" Eagle 2007, 2008 and 2011

Matt Smith (born 31 October 1972) is a British editor and author. He is the current and longest-serving editor of the long-running British science fiction weekly comics anthology magazine 2000 AD and its sister title the Judge Dredd Megazine.

== Career ==
Smith joined 2000 AD in 2000, after three years working as a desk editor for MacMillan, at the time the comic was changing ownership – from Egmont to Rebellion Developments. Starting out as the assistant to the new editor Andy Diggle, Smith was appointed as the ninth incarnation of Tharg the Mighty (a humorous character representing the 2000 AD editor) in January 2002.

After Alan Barnes resigned from the Judge Dredd Megazine, Smith also took over the editorship thereof in 2006, taking the newly-created title editor-in-chief.

Since 2005 Smith has also branched out into writing: his credits so far include a Judge Dredd novel and three novellas, along with three more novellas for one of that series' many spinoffs, and regular stints on the syndicated Judge Dredd newspaper strips.

== Bibliography ==
=== Editing ===
Comics edited include:

- 2000 AD #1274 – ongoing, January 2002 – present
- Judge Dredd Megazine #241 – ongoing, February 2006 – present

=== Writing ===
==== Narrative prose ====
- Judge Dredd: The Final Cut (Black Flame, February 2005, ISBN 1-84416-135-8)
- Tomes of the Dead: The Words of Their Roaring (Abaddon Books, May 2007, ISBN 1-905437-34-X)
- Judge Dredd Year One: City Fathers (Abaddon Books (e-book), August 2012)
- Strontium Dog: Among the Missing (Abaddon Books (e-book), October 2013)
- Judge Dredd Year Two: Down and Out (Abaddon Books (e-book), September 2016)
- The Fall of Deadworld: A trilogy of novellas set in an grimmer alternative version of the Judge Dredd setting shortly before its destruction at the hands of the Dark Judges. The prose stories by Smith act as an extended prelude to the main Fall of Deadworld comic series, created for 2000 AD by writer Nigel "Kek-W" Long and artist Dave Kendall.
  - Red Mosquito (Abaddon Books, 2019)
  - Bone White Seeds (Abaddon Books, 2020)
  - Grey Flesh Flies (Abaddon Books, 2020)
  - An omnibus containing all three novellas was published in June 2020.
- Zenith: "Permission to Land" (credited as Martin Howe), short story in 2000 AD #2050, 2017
- Judge Dredd Year Three: Machineries of Hate (Abaddon Books (e-book), 2020)

==== Comics ====
- Dredd: "Top of the World, Ma-Ma" in Judge Dredd Megazine #328, 2012
- Judge Dredd: Year One #1–4, IDW Publishing, 2013
- Judge Dredd:
  - "The Jimps Club" in 2000 AD Free Comic Book Day issue, 2013
  - "The Badge" in 2000 AD FCBD 2014
  - "In Through the Out Door" in 2000 AD FCBD, 2015
  - "Forty Years of Hurt" in 2000 AD FCBD, 2017
- Judge Anderson #1–4, IDW Publishing, 2014
- Cadet Dredd:
  - "Crowd Control" in 2000 AD FCBD, 2018
  - "Combat Ready" in 2000 AD #2183, 2020

==== Reviews ====
- Nemesis the Warlock: A Monograph (supplement with Judge Dredd Megazine #395, May 2018)

== Awards ==
- 2007: Won the "Favourite Editor" Eagle Award
- 2008: Won the "Favourite Editor" Eagle Award
- 2010: Nominated for the "Favourite Editor" Eagle Award
- 2011: Won the "Favourite Editor" Eagle Award
- 2012: Nominated for the "Favourite Editor" Eagle Award

== Bibliography ==
- Matt Smith at 2000ad.org
- Matt Smith at the Comic Book DB (archived from the original)
- Bishop, David Thrill Power Overload (Rebellion Developments, 260 pages, February 2007, ISBN 1-905437-22-6)

Preceded by Andy Diggle	2000 AD editor 2002–present	Incumbent
Preceded by Alan Barnes	Judge Dredd Megazine editor 2006–present	Incumbent
