= Robert Englund =

American actor and director (born 1947)

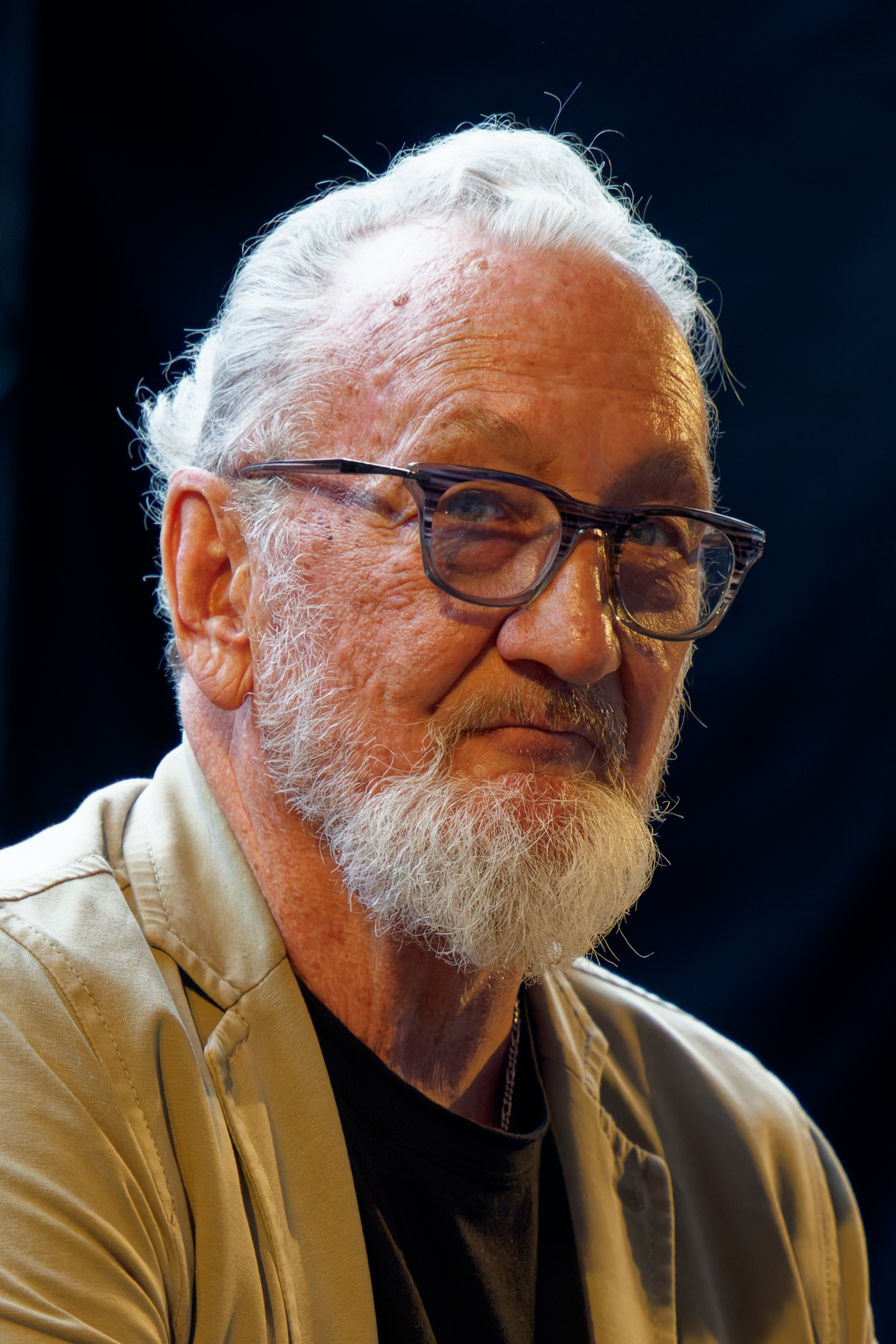
- Englund in Brussels, May 2023
- Born: Robert Barton Englund; June 6, 1947 (age 79); Glendale, California, U.S.
- Education: University of California, Los Angeles; Oakland University; Royal Academy of Dramatic Art
- Occupations: Actor; director
- Years active: 1973–present
- Known for: Portraying Freddy Krueger in A Nightmare on Elm Street
- Spouses: Elizabeth Gardner (m. 1966; div. 1972) Roxanne Rogers (m. 1986; div. 1988) Nancy Booth (m. 1988)
- Website: www.robertenglund.com

Signature
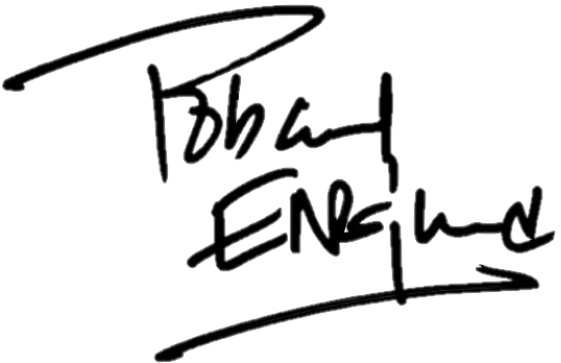

Robert Barton Englund (born June 6, 1947) is an American actor and director. Englund is best known for playing the villain Freddy Krueger in A Nightmare on Elm Street franchise and the crossover film Freddy vs. Jason, a character that earned him the title of scream king. Englund has received multiple accolades and honors, including a Saturn Award, a Fangoria Chainsaw Award, and a star on the Hollywood Walk of Fame.

Classically trained at the Royal Academy of Dramatic Art, Englund began his career as a stage actor in regional theatre and made his film debut in Buster and Billie (1974), followed by supporting roles in films such as Stay Hungry (1976), A Star Is Born (1976), and Big Wednesday (1978). Englund had his breakthrough as the resistance fighter Willie in the miniseries V in 1983. Following his performance in the original A Nightmare on Elm Street (1984), he became closely associated with the horror film genre, and his performance as Freddy is often referenced in American pop culture; Englund has reprised his role as Freddy in seven sequels, as well as the horror anthology series Freddy's Nightmares (1988–1990). Englund has acted in over 100 film and television productions throughout his career, and he has also directed the horror films 976-EVIL (1988) and Killer Pad (2008).

== Early life ==
Englund was born on June 6, 1947, in Glendale, California, the son of Janis MacDonald and Clyde Kent Englund, an aeronautics engineer who helped develop the Lockheed U-2 airplane. He is of part Swedish and Scottish ancestry. Englund began studying acting at the age of twelve, accompanying a friend to a children's theater program at California State University, Northridge.

While in high school, he attended Cranbrook Theatre School (organized by the Cranbrook Educational Community) in Bloomfield Hills, Michigan. He then attended UCLA for three years, before dropping out and transferring to Michigan's Oakland University, where he trained at the Meadow Brook Theater, at the time a branch of the Royal Academy of Dramatic Art.

Englund had five successful years performing in regional theater including plays by Shakespeare and Bernard Shaw. He married for the first time in 1966 to a nurse Elizabeth Gardner. Shortly afterward, he returned to the West Coast in search of film work, and landed a supporting role in the film Buster and Billie, directed by Daniel Petrie.

== Career ==
In 1976, Englund auditioned for the roles of Han Solo and Luke Skywalker in Star Wars. While he didn't get either part, he suggested Mark Hamill for the role of Luke. Englund appeared in the 1976 film Eaten Alive directed by Tobe Hooper. He then played Ranger in Galaxy of Terror, produced by Roger Corman, which was released in 1981. Since then, Englund has made over 100 appearances on film and television. In his early film roles, Englund was usually cast as a nerd or a redneck, and he first gained attention in the role of Visitor technician and resistance fighter Willie in the 1983 miniseries V, as well as the 1984 sequel V: The Final Battle, and V: The Series, in which he was a regular cast member.

Englund as Freddy Krueger in A Nightmare on Elm Street 3: Dream Warriors (1987)

Englund went against type when he accepted the role of Freddy Krueger, the psychopathic burn victim and child murderer in Wes Craven's hugely successful A Nightmare on Elm Street in 1984. He reprised his role as Freddy Krueger in A Nightmare on Elm Street 2: Freddy's Revenge (1985), A Nightmare on Elm Street 3: Dream Warriors (1987), A Nightmare on Elm Street 4: The Dream Master (1988), A Nightmare on Elm Street 5: The Dream Child (1989), Freddy's Dead: The Final Nightmare (1991), Wes Craven's New Nightmare (1994) and Freddy vs. Jason (2003). His association with the genre led him to top-billed roles in The Phantom of the Opera (1989), The Mangler (1995) – another film directed by Tobe Hooper, and 2001 Maniacs (2005).

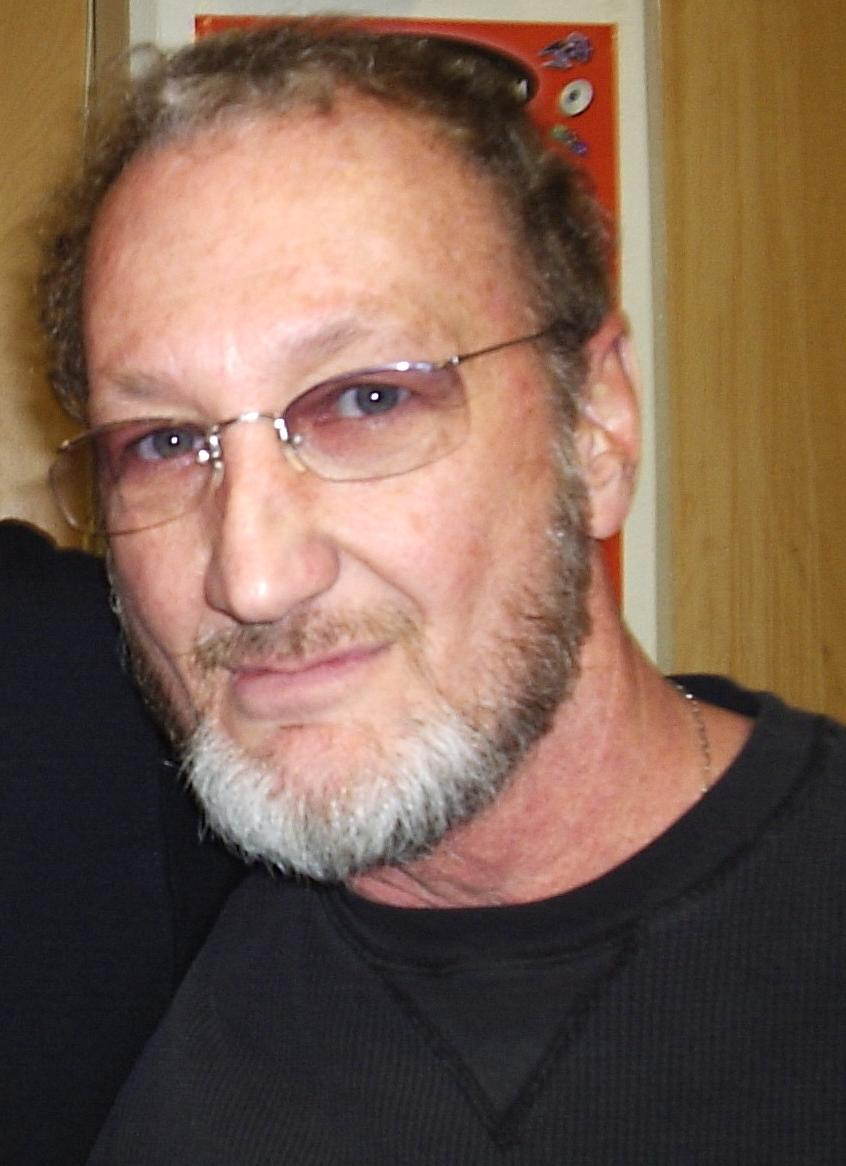
Englund in Gothenburg, Sweden in March 2005

Englund's portrayal of Freddy Krueger is notable for its longevity, with Englund playing the same character in eight consecutive films. Englund has said that he enjoys the role of Freddy as it gives him a break from always acting out the nice guy; indeed, many people who have worked with Englund attest to his congeniality. Makeup artists responsible for the Krueger makeup have commented that Englund was so friendly and talkative that it made the lengthy makeup application slightly more challenging.

Englund's TV appearances include starring in the short-lived series Nightmare Cafe (1992), in which he played Blackie, the mysterious proprietor of the title cafe, and reprising his role of "Freddy Krueger" in the series Freddy's Nightmares – A Nightmare on Elm Street: The Series. His guest roles include the science fiction series Babylon 5, one episode of the show MacGyver as Tim Wexler, Masters of Horror, MadTV, Sliders, and Knight Rider, where he appeared as a phantom haunting a film studio, and Walking Tall: The Series as well as a guest star spot on the hit TV show Walker, Texas Ranger.

His work in voice-over animation includes magician Felix Faust in Justice League, The Riddler on The Batman, The Vulture on The Spectacular Spider-Man, and as Dormammu on The Super Hero Squad Show. On the TV witch drama Charmed (Episode: "Size Matters"), he appeared as a demon who used the services of a lackey to lure people into a decrepit household (where he lived in the walls) and shrank them down to action figure size. He also appeared on an episode of Married... with Children as The Devil. Another appearance was in a 2010 season episode of the television spy send-up Chuck, as a scientist who created a fear-inducing nerve toxin, a similar character to the Scarecrow, one of Batman's enemies in the DC Comics (A character he later portrayed in the video game Injustice 2).

Englund performed as host of the Horror Hall of Fame awards show three times, from 1990 to 1992.

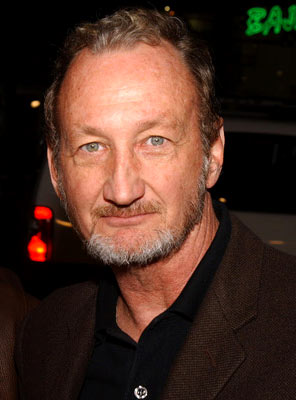
Englund in 2008

Englund made his directorial debut with the 1988 horror film 976-EVIL, co-written by future Oscar winner Brian Helgeland and starring Stephen Geoffreys. During production, Englund met set decorator Nancy Booth, whom he married. His second feature, Killer Pad, was released direct-to-DVD in 2008. During July 2013, he was in pre-production to direct The Vij, about a young priest who is led by an evil genie to commit murder, and who falls in love with an old witch who is not what she seems.

Englund also directed 2 episodes of “Freddy's Nightmares”. The first was “Cabin Fever” and the second “Monkey Dreams”.

His memoir, Hollywood Monster: A Walk Down Elm Street with the Man of Your Dreams, which Alan Goldsher transcribed from his dictations, was published by Pocket Books on October 13, 2009.

He had also starred in the web series "Fear Clinic", where he appeared in five episodes as Dr. Andover.

Englund noted he would welcome a guest appearance in the ABC revival of V in an interview with Todd Sokolove from Forces of Geek. But the series was canceled before he could make such a guest appearance.

In January 2010, it was announced that Englund would return as Jackson Roth for the sequel to Dee Snider's Strangeland, titled Strangeland II: Disciple. However, as of December 2010, no specific dates or plans had been made regarding the project.

Englund made a guest appearance in "The Death of the Queen Bee" episode of Bones, appearing as a quirky janitor at protagonist Dr. Temperance Brennan's old high school. His character, a friend of Brennan's, and situation were introduced as "very creepy... it's like Freddy creepy." Englund was a special guest at the 2010 Streamy Awards, and also appeared as a special guest of the CA Weekend of Horrors on October 8, 2010.

Englund appeared on the Creation Entertainment Weekend of Horrors in May 2010. In May 2010, he was signed for the American independent thriller Inkubus.

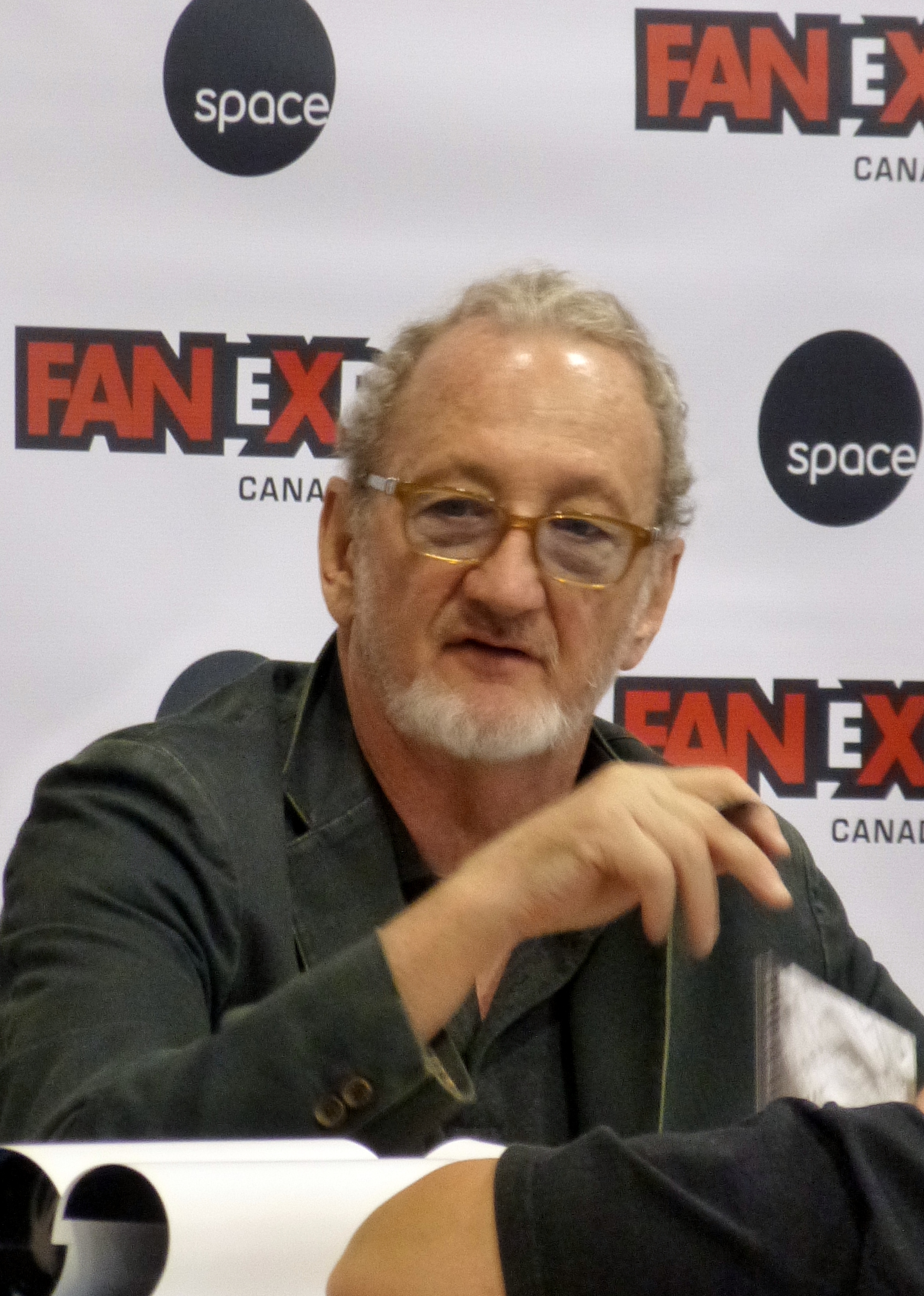
Englund in the 2014 Fan Expo Canada

Englund appeared as himself in the Call of Duty: Black Ops Zombies map, "Call of the Dead" as one of the playable characters, and acted out the part of a Halloween-themed serial killer in the 2010s revival of Hawaii Five-0. He also took part in a Halloween Come Dine with Me for Channel 4 in 2012. He also appeared in Jack Brooks: Monster Slayer and Behind the Mask: The Rise of Leslie Vernon.

Although the character of Freddy Krueger is regarded as one of the most terrifying in cinema history, Englund is often described by fellow actors and film crews as being extremely friendly and appreciative of his fans, many admitting that his portrayal of Krueger frightened them as children.

He starred in The Last Showing and Fear Clinic, the latter was released on October 22, 2014, at the Screamfest Film Festival. Englund was also a special guest at Shock Comic Con on Valentine's Day 2015. In February 2016, Englund hosted a "Nightmare on Elm Street" marathon on El Rey Network.

Englund was featured in the 2019 documentary Scream, Queen! My Nightmare on Elm Street, which examines the LGBT themes of A Nightmare on Elm Street 2: Freddy's Revenge and the life of actor Mark Patton.

As of 2020, Englund has been hosting the Travel Channel show True Terror with Robert Englund, which showcases scary but true stories about the supernatural or strange.

In 2022, Englund appeared in the fourth season of the Netflix series Stranger Things as Pennhurst Mental Hospital patient Victor Creel.

He was given a star on the Hollywood Walk of Fame on Halloween in 2025.

== Filmography ==
=== Film ===
Year	Title	Role	Notes
1974	Buster and Billie	Whitey	
1975	Slashed Dreams	Michael Sutherland	Also known as Sunburst
1975	Hustle	Hold-up Man	
1976	Stay Hungry	Franklin	
1976	St. Ives	Hood #1	
1976	Eaten Alive	Buck	
1976	A Star Is Born	Marty	Uncredited
1977	The Great Smokey Roadblock	Beebo Crozier	
1978	Big Wednesday	Narrator, Fly	
1978	Bloodbrothers	Mott	
1978	The Fifth Floor	Benny	
1981	Dead & Buried	Harry	
1981	Galaxy of Terror	Ranger	
1982	Don't Cry, It's Only Thunder	Tripper	
1984	A Nightmare on Elm Street	Freddy Krueger	
1985	A Nightmare on Elm Street 2: Freddy's Revenge	Freddy Krueger / Bus Driver	
1986	Never Too Young to Die	Riley	
1987	A Nightmare on Elm Street 3: Dream Warriors	Freddy Krueger	
1988	A Nightmare on Elm Street 4: The Dream Master	Freddy Krueger / Nurse	
1988	976-EVIL		Director
1989	C.H.U.D. II: Bud the C.H.U.D.	Man in Trenchcoat Walking with Trick-or-Treaters	Uncredited
1989	A Nightmare on Elm Street 5: The Dream Child	Freddy Krueger / Maniac	
1989	The Phantom of the Opera	Erik Destler, The Phantom	
1990	The Adventures of Ford Fairlane	Smiley	
1991	Freddy's Dead: The Final Nightmare	Freddy Krueger	
1992	Dance Macabre	Anthony Wager, Madame	
1993	Tobe Hooper's Night Terrors	Paul Chevalier, Marquis De Sade	
1994	Wes Craven's New Nightmare	Himself / Freddy Krueger	
1995	The Mangler	Bill Gartley	
1996	Killer Tongue	Prison Director	
1996	The Paper Brigade	Crazy Man Cooper	
1996	The Vampyre Wars		
1997	Perfect Target	Colonel Shakwell	
1997	Wishmaster	Raymond Beaumont	
1998	Meet the Deedles	Nemo	
1998	Urban Legend	Professor William Wexler	
1998	Strangeland	Jackson "Jack" Roth	
1999	The Prince and the Surfer	Kratski	
2001	Wish You Were Dead	Bernie Garces	
2003	Freddy vs. Jason	Freddy Krueger	
2003	As a Bad Dream	Professor	
2003	The Return of Cagliostro	Erroll Douglas	(Il ritorno di Cagliostro)
2003	Nobody Knows Anything!	Jack Sampson	
2005	2001 Maniacs	Mayor George W. Buckman	
2005	Repetition	Himself	
2006	Hatchet	Sampson Dunston	
2006	Behind the Mask: The Rise of Leslie Vernon	Doc Halloran	
2006	Heartstopper	Sheriff Roger Berger	
2007	Jack Brooks: Monster Slayer	Professor Gordon Crowley	
2008	Red	Mr. Doust	
2008	Zombie Strippers	Ian Essko	
2008	Killer Pad		Director
2009	Night of the Sinner	The Prince	
2009	The Vij		
2010	Web Cam 3D		
2010	De mayor quiero ser soldado	Psychologist	
2010	Never Sleep Again: The Elm Street Legacy	Himself	
2010	Hollywood Don't Surf!	Himself	
2010	Tamora Gamble	Rory Columbus	
2011	Good Day for It	Wayne Jackson	
2011	Inkubus	Inʞubus	
2012	Strippers vs Werewolves	Tapper	
2012	Zombie Mutation	Dream Man	
2013	Sanitarium	Sam	(segment "Figuratively Speaking")
2013	The Moleman of Belmont Avenue	Mr. Hezekiah Confab	
2013	Crystal Lake Memories: The Complete History of Friday the 13th	Himself	Documentary
2014	The Last Showing	Stuart	
2014	Witches Blood	Himself	
2015	Fear Clinic	Dr. Peter Andover	
2015	Kantemir	John	
2015	The Funhouse Massacre	Warden Kane	
2016	The Midnight Man	Dr. Harding	
2017	Nightworld	Jacob	
2017	Nightmares in the Makeup Chair	Himself	Documentary
2020	In Search of Darkness: Part II	Himself	Documentary
2022	Choose or Die	Himself	
2023	Natty Knocks	Mr. Meredith	
2023	Abruptio	Mr. Salk	
2023	Hollywood Dreams & Nightmares: The Robert Englund Story	Himself	Documentary
2026	Pinocchio Unstrung	The Cricket	

=== Television ===
Year	Title	Role	Notes
1977	The Hardy Boys/Nancy Drew Mysteries: Mystery of the Fallen Angels	Gar	1 episode
1977	Young Joe, the Forgotten Kennedy	Willy	Television film
1978	Police Woman	Jonas	Episode: "Sons"
1978	The Courage and the Passion	Sgt. Bell	Television film
1979	The Ordeal of Patty Hearst	Informer	Television film
1979	Police Story	Painter	Episode: "A Cry for Justice"
1979	Soap	Simon	2 episodes
1979	Mind Over Murder	Ted Beasly	Television film
1979	California Fever	Buddy Burns	Episode: "Centerfold"
1979	Paris	J.J. Eastwick	Episode: "Dead Men Don't Kill"
1980	Charlie's Angels	Harold Belkin	Episode: "Harrigan's Angel"
1980	Flo	Web	Episode: "The Hero of Flo's Yellow Rose"
1981	CHiPs	Zack	Episode: "Forty Tons of Trouble"
1981	Walking Tall	Bobby Joe Wilson	Episode: "The Killing of McNeal County's Children"
1981	Hart to Hart	Buddy Kilgore	Episode: "Rhinestone Harts"
1982	Thou Shalt Not Kill	Bobby Collins	Television film
1982	Mysterious Two	Boone	Television film
1982	Cassie & Co.	Cliff	Episode: "Fade Out"
1983	The Fighter	Charlie	Television film
1983	Starflight: The Plane That Couldn't Land	Scott	Television film
1983	Simon & Simon	3-Card Monty	Episode: "Red Dog Blues"
1983	V	Willie	2 episodes
1983	I Want to Live	Sam Cooper	Television film
1983	Manimal	Thug	Episode: "Night of the Beast"
1983	Hobson's Choice	Freddy Beenstock	Television film
1983	Journey's End		Television film
1984	Alice	Sammy	Episode: "Vera, the Horse Thief"
1984	V: The Final Battle	Willie	3 episodes
1984–1985	V	Willie	13 episodes
1985	Hunter	Vaughn	Episode: "Million Dollar Misunderstanding"
1986	MacGyver	Tim	Episode: "Flame's End"
1986	Knight Rider	Edward Kent	Episode: "Fright Knight"
1986	North and South Book II	Deserter	1 episode
1986–1987	Downtown	Dennis Shothoffer	14 episodes
1988	D.C. Follies	Freddy Krueger	Episode: "Freddy Krueger's Nightmare: Dan Quayle Elected President"
1988–1990	Freddy's Nightmares	Freddy Krueger	44 episodes Director: "Cabin Fever"
1992	Nightmare Cafe	Blackie	6 episodes
1994	Mortal Fear	Dr. Ralph Wannamaker	Television film
1995	Legend	Mordechai, Willy Miles	Episode: "The Gospel According to Legend"
1995	The Unspoken Truth	Ernest "Ernie" Trainor	Television film
1996	Walker, Texas Ranger	Lyle Eckert	Episode: "Deadline"
1996	Babylon 5	Jeremiah	Episode: "Grey 17 Is Missing"
1996	Sliders	Dr. James Aldohn	Episode: "State of the A.R.T."
1997	Married... with Children	Lucifer	Episode: "Damn Bundy"
1998	The Simpsons	Freddy Krueger	Voice, episode: "Treehouse of Horror IX"
1999	The Jamie Foxx Show	Clive	Episode: "Bro Jack"
1999	The Hughleys	Evil Bloodthirsty Brian	Episode: "Storm o' the Century"
2000	Python	Dr. Anton Rudolph	Television film
2001	The Nightmare Room	Mr. Bell	Episode: "The Howler"
2001	Charmed	Gammill	Episode: "Size Matters"
2002	Justice League	Felix Faust	Voice, episode: "Paradise Lost"
2002	Windfall	Scratch	Television film
2003	I'm with Her	Leonard Heckman	Episode: "All About Evil"
2004	Super Robot Monkey Team Hyperforce Go!	Ringmaster	Voice, episode: "Circus of Ooze"
2004–2008	The Batman	Riddler	Voice, 4 episodes
2005	Justice League Unlimited	Felix Faust	Voice, episode: "The Balance"
2005	Masters of Horror	The MC	Episode: "Dance of the Dead"
2007	Black Swarm	Eli Giles	Television film
2008–2009	The Spectacular Spider-Man	Vulture	Voice, 4 episodes
2009	The Super Hero Squad Show	Dormammu	Voice, episode: "Enter Dormammu!"
2009	Fear Clinic	Dr. Andover	5 episodes
2010	Bones	Ray Buxley	Episode: "The Death of the Queen Bee"
2010	Chuck	Dr. Stanley Wheelwright	Episode: "Chuck Versus the Aisle of Terror"
2010	Supernatural	Dr. Robert	Episode: "Appointment in Samarra"
2011	Hawaii Five-0	Samuel Lee	Episode: "Ka Iwi Kapu (Sacred Bones)"
2011	Scream: The Inside Story	Himself	Documentary film
2011–2017	Regular Show	Anti-Pops, Stag Man	Voice, 8 episodes
2012	Green Lantern: The Animated Series	Myglom	Voice, episode: "Razer's Edge"
2012	Criminal Minds	Detective Gassner	Episode: "Heathridge Manor"
2012	Lake Placid: The Final Chapter	Jim Bickerman	Television film
2013	Workaholics	Dr. TelAmeriCorp, Josh	Episode: "A TelAmerican Horror Story"
2014	Teenage Mutant Ninja Turtles	Dire Beaver, Dread Beaver	Voice, episode: "In Dreams"
2015	Hulk and the Agents of S.M.A.S.H.	Pluto	Voice, episode: "The Tale of Hercules"
2015	Hell's Kitchen	Himself	1 episode
2015	Lake Placid vs. Anaconda	Jim Bickerman	Television film
2017	Uncle Grandpa	Boogie Man	Voice, episode: "Broken Boogie"
2017	Pig Goat Banana Cricket	Lost Larry, Hockey Mask	Voice, episode: "Jiminy Ron Cricket"
2018	The Goldbergs	Freddy Krueger	Episode: "Mister Knifey-Hands"
2018	Spy Kids: Mission Critical	The Squatter	Voice, episode: "Home Sick"
2020	True Terror with Robert Englund	Himself	
2020	JJ Villard's Fairy Tales	Hive Head, Toilet, Porridge Dad	Voice, episode: "The Goldilox Massacre"
2021–2022	Dota: Dragon's Blood	Aetherak	Voice, 2 episodes
2022	Stranger Things	Victor Creel	Episode: "Chapter Four: Dear Billy"
2023	King Star King	Jeff Bezos	Voice, special: "King Star King!/!/!/"
2023–2024	Curses!	Corneilus Vanderhouven	Voice, 5 episodes
2026	Stranger Things: Tales from '85	Cosmo	Voice
2026	Regular Show: The Lost Tapes	Anti-Pops, Guard 2	Voice, episode: "Fix That Tape"

=== Music videos ===
Year	Title	Artist	Role	Ref.
1987	"Dream Warriors"	Dokken	Freddy Krueger	
1988	"Are You Ready for Freddy"	The Fat Boys	Freddy Krueger	

=== Web ===
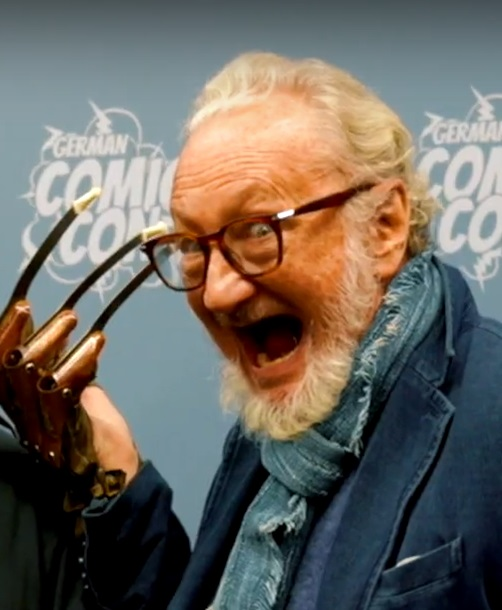
Robert Englund referencing his character Freddy Krueger, 2022

Year	Title	Role	Notes
2009	Fear Clinic	Dr. Andover	5 episodes

=== Video games ===
Year	Title	Voice role	Notes
2011	Marvel Super Hero Squad Online	Dormammu	
2011	Mortal Kombat	Freddy Krueger	DLC character
2011	Call of Duty: Black Ops	Himself	Zombies mode
2016	Master of Orion: Conquer the Stars	Terran Khan	
2017	Injustice 2	Dr. Jonathan Crane / The Scarecrow	
2026	Fortnite	Freddy Krueger	

== Awards and nominations ==
Year	Award	Category	Nominated work	Result
1988	Saturn Award	Best Supporting Actor	A Nightmare on Elm Street 3: Dream Warriors	Nominated
1990	Saturn Award	Best Supporting Actor	A Nightmare on Elm Street 4: The Dream Master	Nominated
1995	Fantafestival	Best Actor	The Mangler	Won
2001	Saturn Award	The Life Career Award	-	Won
2004	Fangoria Chainsaw Awards	Best Actor	Freddy vs. Jason	Nominated
2007	Sitges Film Festival	Time-Machine Honorary Award	-	Won
2009	Fangoria Chainsaw Awards	Best Supporting Actor	Jack Brooks: Monster Slayer	Nominated
2010	New York City Horror Film Festival	Lifetime Achievement Award	-	Won
2010	Streamy Awards	Best Male Actor in a Drama Web Series	Fear Clinic	Nominated
2020	CinEuphoria Awards	Career – Honorary Award	-	Won
2022	Saturn Award	Guest Performance in a Streaming Series	Stranger Things	Nominated
