= Friday the 13th: Hell Lake =

2005 Friday the 13th series novel

- Author: Paul A. Woods
- Language: English
- Series: Friday the 13th
- Release number: 2
- Genre: Horror
- Publisher: Black Flame (UK); Simon & Schuster (US)
- Publication date: 9 August 2005
- Publication place: United Kingdom
- Media type: Print (Paperback)
- Pages: 393
- ISBN: 9781844161829
- OCLC: 61477161
- Preceded by: Friday the 13th: Church of the Divine Psychopath
- Followed by: Friday the 13th: Hate-Kill-Repeat

Friday the 13th: Hell Lake is a 2005 British horror novel written by Paul A. Woods and published by Black Flame. A tie-in to the Friday the 13th series of American horror films, it is the second in a series of five Friday the 13th novels published by Black Flame and revolves around undead killer Jason Voorhees escaping from Hell to resume his killing spree on Earth.

== Plot ==
Wayne Ricardo Sanchez, a Satanist who committed rapes and murders throughout Florida, is executed and condemned to Hell. On the lowest level of Hell, Sanchez befriends and forms a telepathic bond with undead killer Jason Voorhees, whom Sanchez corrals into leading him and thousands of other damned souls up through the other layers of Hell and to a portal that drops everyone in Crystal Lake, Jason's old hunting ground on Earth. Most of the resurrected criminals, including Sanchez, disperse throughout the United States, but Jason remains in Crystal Lake, preying on students of the nearby Forest Green University. Trey Leblanc, one of the only African Americans enrolled at Forest Green, becomes a suspect in the murders, partly due to racial profiling, and rallies the university's remaining students into leaving in defiance of Sheriff George Casey. Paul Christos, a misanthropic nihilist who idolizes Sanchez, nearly falls victim to Benjamin Weilman and Harold Lawrence, a pair of snuff filmmakers who were among those who escaped from Hell. Trey, his ex-girlfriend, Shawna Black, and their friend, Gretchen Andrews, combat the duo, killing Lawrence before encountering Jason, who kills Weilman. The trio escapes from Jason, who loses his hockey mask in the melee, only to be arrested by Sheriff Casey and the National Guard.

Jason, having donned a welding helmet and acquired a machine gun, teleports into the prison the students were remanded to and goes on a rampage through it, narrowly missing Trey and Shawna. The pair go in search of Gretchen, who has been taken in by Trey's lawyer, Diane Miranda, and her colleague, Edward North, who is secretly one of the fugitives from Hell, a serial date rapist named Charles Westenhaus who overdosed his own diabetic mother with insulin and now seeks to consolidate power over the other Hellions. Fearing Jason and Sanchez's influence over him, Westenhaus uses hypnotic drugs to interrogate Gretchen about Jason, which results in Gretchen being possessed by Jason's deceased mother, Pamela. Trey and Shawna reunite with Gretchen, saving her from Jason, who skinned Sheriff Casey and wore his flesh as a disguise to get to her and Diane. The trio flees after Jason bisects Diane.

In Miami, Christos, having met Sanchez, assists him in murdering a family before they are confronted by Santo Alicante, another escapee from Hell who had been sent by Westenhaus to assassinate Sanchez. Sanchez murders Alicante and Christos and is himself killed by an angry mob that recognizes him as the "Daytona Beach Devil Boy." Elsewhere, Jason attacks the refugee camp Trey, Shawna, and Gretchen had joined and kills Shawna. Trey returns to Crystal Lake, which Jason is lured to by Gretchen channeling Pamela. Trey sacrifices himself to send an electric shock through the lake, which incinerates Jason and opens a gateway to Hell that sucks in all of the surviving Hellions, including Westenhaus. Gretchen, burned and disfigured by the electric shock, is admitted to a psychiatric hospital, where she has a vision of Jason in Hell.

== Reception ==
Mark L. Miller of Ain't It Cool News enjoyed the book's premise, kills, and exploration of Jason Voorhees's psyche, but also opined that the writing suffered from "show, don't tell" and that the plot was "a bit fan fic-y" and unfocused, concluding, "there's a lot going on in this book and only some of it works." Nat Brehmer of Wicked Horror felt that, while the novel did have an intriguing beginning, developments like Jason wielding an assault rifle and replacing his trademark hockey mask with a welding helmet gave the impression Hell Lake was a case of author Paul A. Woods "just not wanting to write about the character and bitterly doing it anyway." Similarly, Joel Harley of Rue Morgue opined that once the book's narrative left Hell, it became "stickier" and began suffering from increasingly purple prose, with Harley concluding, "What had started as one of the series' most inventive stories becomes muddled by increasing levels of silliness, with ideas thrown thick and fast, whether they make sense or not."
