= A Nightmare on Elm Street (soundtrack) =

A Nightmare on Elm Street (Original Motion Picture Soundtrack)

Film score by Steve Jablonsky
- Released: April 27, 2010
- Recorded: 2009–2010
- Genre: Film score
- Length: 49:55
- Label: WaterTower Music
- Producer: Steve Jablonsky

Steve Jablonsky chronology
Transformers: Revenge of the Fallen (2009)	A Nightmare on Elm Street (2010)	Your Highness (2011)

A Nightmare on Elm Street (Original Motion Picture Soundtrack) is the soundtrack to the 2010 film A Nightmare on Elm Street; a remake of Wes Craven's 1984 film, as well as the ninth overall installment of the Nightmare on Elm Street franchise. The film's original score is composed by Steve Jablonsky and released through WaterTower Music on April 27, 2010, three days before the film's release.

== Development ==
Steve Jablonsky composed the film's original music who integrated and re-interpreted elements from Charles Bernstein's score for the original film; although he opined on not including the original film's theme. According to the producer, Brad Fuller, the score was reminiscent of the 1980s with the use of synthesizers and instruments from that era. Jablonsky and Y. Suzette Moriarty orchestrated a 60-piece string orchestra from the Hollywood Studio Symphony, conducted by Nick Glennie-Smith, with the film's director Samuel Bayer watched the orchestral sessions. Besides the orchestra, a 15-person children's choir also employed to perform the main theme. Although, 65 minutes of music had been recorded for the film, only around 50 minutes of music had been included in the soundtrack.

== Reception ==
Hugh Hart of Wired wrote "by the sixth or seventh variation on the "Oh my God, it's Freddy!" theme, the novelty wears off, despite daggerlike orchestrations from composer Steve Jablonsky". A. O. Scott of The New York Times described it as "creepy", and Dennis Harvey of Variety called it "horrifying".

== Track listing ==
A Nightmare on Elm Street (Original Motion Picture Soundtrack) track listing
No.	Title	Length
1.	"Freddy's Coming for You"	4:28
2.	"Main Title"	2:35
3.	"Missing Pictures"	2:22
4.	"Rufus?"	1:34
5.	"Quiet Drive"	1:48
6.	"Jesse and Kris"	1:07
7.	"Jesse and the Police"	2:50
8.	"You Smell Different"	2:14
9.	"A Man Named Fred Krueger"	5:03
10.	"Research"	2:22
11.	"It's Hot in Here"	3:12
12.	"The School"	0:52
13.	"Where the Monster Lives"	4:51
14.	"Wake Me Up"	4:55
15.	"Boo"	1:06
16.	"Like It Used to Be"	5:32
17.	"One More Nap"	2:44
18.	"Jump Rope" (written by Charles Bernstein)	0:20
Total length:		49:55

== Personnel ==
Credits adapted from liner notes.

Production

- Composer – Steve Jablonsky
- Producer – Steve Durkee, Steve Jablonsky
- Additional music – Jay Flood
- Sound design – Clay Duncan
- Sound engineer – Daniel Kresco
- Recording and mixing – Jeff Biggers
- Mastering – Stephen Marsh
- Vocals – Dahlia Low

Orchestra

- Conductor – Nick Glennie-Smith
- Orchestra contractor – Peter Rotter
- Supervising orchestrator – Y. Suzette Moriarty, Steve Jablonsky
- Additional orchestration – Elizabeth Finch, Frank Macchia, Geoff Stradling
- Music preparation – Booker White
- Concertmaster – Endre Granat

Choir

- Choir – Claire Gershon, Clara Logan, Colin Clarke, Emily Logan, Emma Gunn, Hana Culbraith, Joel Thomas Anderson, Joshua Britt, Kaylin Anderson, Kylan Brooks, Lexi Gunn, Maia Culbraith, Mariah Britt, Sally Stevens, Susie Logan, Teri Koide
- Choir contractor – Sally Stevens

Instruments

- Cello – Andrew Shulman, Armen Ksajikian, Cecelia Tsan, Christina Soule, Christine Ermacoff, Dane Little, David Speltz, Dennis Karmazyn, Erika Duke-Kirkpatrick, Jennifer Kuhn, John Walz, Paula Hochhalter, Steve Richards, Suzie Katayama, Timothy Loo, Vanessa Freebairn-Smith, Steve Erdody
- Double bass – Bruce Morgenthaler, Christian Kollgaard, David Parmeter, Drew D Dembowski, Edward Meares, Michael Valerio, Oscar Hidalgo, Richard Feves, Nico Abondolo
- Drums – Jon Darling
- Viola – Andrew Duckles, Darrin McCann, David Walther, Gina Coletti, Jennie Hansen, Keith Greene, Luke Maurer, Maria Newman, Matthew Funes, Robert Becker, Roland Kato, Shawn Mann, Victoria Miskolczy, Brian Dembow, Maria Newman
- Violin – Alyssa Park, Belinda Broughton, Bruce Dukov, Charlie Bisharat, Darius Campo, Dimitrie Leivici, Eun-Mee Ahn, Jacqueline Brand, Josefina Vergara, Katia Popov, Kenneth Yerke, Kevin Connolly, Lisa Sutton, Lorenz Gamma, Mari Tsumura, Natalie Leggett, Phillip Levy, Roberto Cani, Searmi Park, Serena McKinney, Shalini Vijayan, Sid Page, Tamara Hatwan, Julie Ann Gigante
