= Friday the 13th: Church of the Divine Psychopath =

2005 novel by Scott S. Phillips

- Author: Scott S. Phillips
- Language: English
- Series: Friday the 13th
- Release number: 1
- Genre: Horror
- Publisher: Black Flame (UK); Simon & Schuster (US)
- Publication date: 9 August 2005
- Publication place: United Kingdom
- Media type: Print (Paperback)
- Pages: 403
- ISBN: 9781844161812
- OCLC: 60371478
- Followed by: Friday the 13th: Hell Lake

Friday the 13th: Church of the Divine Psychopath is a 2005 British horror novel written by Scott S. Phillips and published by Black Flame. A tie-in to the Friday the 13th series of American horror films, it is the first in a series of five Friday the 13th novels published by Black Flame and revolves around government operatives coming into conflict with a cult that worships undead killer Jason Voorhees.

== Plot ==
Camp Crystal Lake, the hunting ground of undead killer Jason Voorhees, has been leased to the Ministry of the Heavenly Vessel, a fringe Christian group led by Father Eric Long. Long believes Jason is an avenging angel who judges and punishes sinners at the behest of God and draws up plans to revive him after finding Jason lying dormant in Crystal Lake. Long's congregants include Kelly Mills, a troubled twenty-six-year-old with a history of being abused both physically and sexually, including being gangraped as a child, and her best friend Meredith Host, a closeted teenage lesbian who has a crush on Kelly. A few days after the Ministry moves into the camp, a group of government Operators set up nearby, having been assigned to locate and kill Jason. Walter Hobb, a member of the unit living in disgrace since his involvement in a meth lab raid that went awry, is convinced the mission is a Snipe hunt.

Long uses electricity to resuscitate Jason, who murders several of Long's disciples, whom Long dismisses as sinners rightfully punished by Jason. Kelly flees the church and seeks aid from the Operators. Jason begins murdering the Operators one by one and is assisted in his rampage by Long, who has ordered his followers to kill the Operators. One of the slain Operators is the group's leader and Hobb's best friend, Jeff Townsend. Meredith, distraught over Long's increasingly megalomaniacal behavior, the lecherous advances of Long's second-in-command, a disabled Marine named Curtis Rickles, and her belief her sexuality was the reason Jason murdered her parents, runs away from the camp in search of Jason but is found and snapped back to her senses by Hobb and Kelly.

After Long refuses to surrender, the remaining Operators lay siege to Camp Crystal Lake. Jason joins the fray, killing combatants on both sides; during the battle, Rickles sexually assaults Meredith and is shot by Hobb, who is unable to save Meredith from Jason. In the aftermath, the only ones left alive are Hobb, Kelly, Jason, and Long. Long, having missed the conflict due to passing out after abandoning his three wives and engaging in frenzied self-flagellation, denounces his cultists before supplicating himself before Jason to be "judged" by him; he is killed while declaring, "Praise God in all His wisdom."

Hobb arms himself with a pair of grenade launchers, while Kelly, in a bid to lure Jason out into the open, strips to her underwear and prances through the ruins of Camp Crystal Lake. Jason takes the bait and chases Kelly into the cafeteria, where he is ambushed by Hobb. During their fight, Hobb knocks Jason into a pit where the Ministry had been dumping the dead, including Townsend. Hobb blows Jason and the mass grave up, recovers Jason's body parts and hockey mask to place in government custody, and drives off with Kelly.

== Publication ==
Author Scott S. Phillips has stated he had "a great time" writing the book and that he was "pretty much left alone" while authoring it; the only parameter Black Flame had given him to follow was "to make it R-rated." However, Phillips has also declared, "After a truly unpleasant experience with the editor of my novel Friday the 13th: Church of the Divine Psychopath, I decided to take a stab at self-publishing, and I've never looked back." Black Flame "goofed up" and did not credit Phillips with the "S" initial he used to avoid being confused with another author named Scott Phillips.

Phillips celebrated the book's release with a signing at the Dark Delicacies bookstore in Burbank, California, on August 20, 2005.

== Reception ==
Nat Brehmer of Wicked Horror felt the novel was "pretty decent" with an intriguing premise and a "great" villain in the form of Father Eric Long. In a review written for Rue Morgue, Joel Harley praised the book, opining that it added "a new dimension to the franchise in a way that the movies could never have" and was "one of the franchise's most vibrant and exciting entries to date." Brehmer, in an expanded review written for Medium, reiterated that Church of the Divine Psychopath was "a crude, hyper-violent, exceptional splatterpunk horror novel" that, despite being "gleefully mean-spirited" with a "jet-black" sense of humor, did not shy away from serious and traumatic topics, which, in Brehmer's opinion, contributed to it being the best of the five Friday the 13th novels published by Black Flame.
