= Thrill-Power Overload =

- Cover of the book, featuring a montage of 2000 AD characters, by Brian Bolland
- Author: David Bishop
- Illustrator: Various
- Cover artist: Brian Bolland
- Language: English
- Subject: 2000 AD
- Publisher: Rebellion Developments
- Publication date: February 2007
- Publication place: United Kingdom
- Media type: Comics
- Pages: 260
- ISBN: 1-905437-22-6
- OCLC: 72151598

Thrill Power Overload, or TPO is a book about the history of the British comic 2000 AD written by David Bishop, one of its editors.

== History ==
The book started life as series of articles written by David Bishop and serialised in the Judge Dredd Megazine, forming the most comprehensive history of the comic 2000 AD yet written.

The articles gave details of the way particular strips were created, the various financial and other external pressures the comic had faced, and some behind the scenes gossip.

A similar follow-up feature, Fifteen Years, Creep!, was a history of the Megazine itself.

== Bibliography ==
The instalments were:

- Thrill Power Overload (Judge Dredd Megazine #4.09-205, 2002-2003)
- 15 Years, Creep! (Judge Dredd Megazine #237-242, 2005-2006)

They have now been collected and expanded into a book:

- Thrill Power Overload (Rebellion Developments, 260 pages, hardcover, February 2007, ISBN 1-905437-22-6, paperback, February 2009, ISBN 1-905437-95-1)

== Awards ==
- 2007: Nominated for the "Favourite Comics-Related Book" Eagle Award
