= Nightmares in the Makeup Chair =

- Starring: Robert Englund
- Release date: 2018
- Country: United States
- Language: English

Nightmares in the Makeup Chair is a documentary film, written and directed by Mike Kerz and released in 2018.

The film stars Robert Englund, Robert Kurtzman and Rich Koz. The film features Robert Englund’s return to his Freddy Krueger makeup and documents the process as special makeup effects artist Robert Kurtzman creates and applies the Freddy makeup to Robert Englund. Every step in the Freddy Krueger makeup process is detailed as Robert Englund reminisces and shares stories and anecdotes about the making of the Nightmares on Elm Street movies and his years playing Freddy Krueger.

Robert Englund agreed to wear his Freddy Krueger makeup one more time and produce Nightmares in the Makeup Chair to pay tribute to the art of practical special effects makeup artists.

The Freddy makeup application process was filmed at the 2014 Flashback Weekend Chicago Horror Convention at the Crowne Plaza Chicago O’Hare in Rosemont, Illinois. Scenes for Nightmares in the Makeup Chair were also filmed in Robert Kurtzman’s studio, Creature Corps, in Crestline, Ohio. Robert Kurtzman filmed the process in which he details the creative steps in designing, sculpting, manufacturing and applying the final version of Robert Englund’s Freddy Krueger overlapping appliance prosthetic makeup.

The film was announced to the public on February 1, 2017 by Entertainment Weekly. The trailer was premiered on YouTube and had over 100,000 views in the first two days.
