= A Nightmare on Elm Street: The Dream Dealers =

2006 novel by Jeffrey Thomas

- Author: Jeffrey Thomas
- Language: English
- Series: A Nightmare on Elm Street
- Release number: 5
- Genre: Horror, science fiction
- Publisher: Black Flame (UK); Simon & Schuster (US)
- Publication date: 11 July 2006
- Publication place: United Kingdom
- Media type: Print (Paperback)
- Pages: 398
- ISBN: 9781844163830
- OCLC: 65469780
- Preceded by: A Nightmare on Elm Street: Perchance to Dream

A Nightmare on Elm Street: The Dream Dealers is a 2006 British science fiction horror novel written by Jeffrey Thomas and published by Black Flame. A tie-in to the Nightmare on Elm Street series of American horror films, it is the fifth and final installment in a series of five Nightmare on Elm Street novels published by Black Flame and is set in a future where technological advancement has allowed for the recording and reliving of dreams, which attracts the attention of supernatural killer Freddy Krueger.

== Plot ==
In the near future, where dreams and memories can be recorded and relived with Saxon Systems' TranceBoxes, the government has contracted the Springwood, Ohio, branch of Macrocosm Research to study the digitized brains of local murder victims, all of whom had strange tumors in the parts of their brains associated with dreaming; unbeknownst to the Macrocosm researchers, the victims were killed by Freddy Krueger, a serial child rapist and killer who, after being burned to death by angry parents, now haunts the Dream World. Freddy, long dormant due to a lack of fear from Springwood's populace to feed on, is revitalized by his old victims' nightmares being studied and begins terrorizing the Macrocosm researchers and the employees of Mnemonic Designs, a company Alex Carmack, a researcher for Macrocosm, had smuggled the dreams to in hopes of selling them to Saxon. Alex gives TranceBox copies of the recorded nightmares to his younger brother, Devon, and five of Devon's friends, unknowingly granting more power to Freddy.

One of Devon's friends, a hacker named Autumn Langevin, contemplates making the nightmares available for illegal download on the Internet, which would give Freddy the means to torment the entire world and not just Springwood. As Freddy begins killing people, including two of Devon's friends, he also tries to tempt Autumn into uploading the nightmares, promising to make her a God. After three of his colleagues at Macrocosm are killed, Alex trashes the company's equipment in an attempt to combat Freddy and calls Trisha Smith, his girlfriend and co-worker at Mnemonic, and instructs her to destroy everything related to the nightmares at Mnemonic. After dismantling Mnemonic's equipment, Trisha calls Devon, and together they use a TranceBox to enter the Dream World in an attempt to save a trio of Mnemonic employees being held there by Freddy. Devon and Trisha fail to stop Freddy from butchering the three Mnemonic employees but do call and warn Devon's girlfriend, Grace Simmons, and her friend, Ama Oduro, to destroy their copies of the nightmares while Devon checks in on Autumn.

Autumn has begun uploading the nightmares onto her website, but Devon destroys Autumn's computers, stopping the upload and prompting an enraged Freddy to murder Autumn. Alex uses Macrocosm technology to erase Trisha, Grace, and Ama's memories of Freddy. Devon, using a bomb he found in Dream World, blows Freddy up and leaves him to the mercy of the vengeful souls of his recent victims, including Autumn. Alex wipes his and Devon's memories of Freddy, but a few weeks later, Macrocosm, goaded by the government, begins studying the tumors found in the brains of Freddy's latest victims, with the project being headed by the amnesiac Alex, who believes he can use memories extracted from the brains to discover the identity of whoever killed his and Devon's friends and "drag him out of the shadows—into the light."

== Publication ==
In 2004, Black Flame solicited pitches from author Jeffrey Thomas for tie-in novels based on films produced by New Line Cinema. Black Flame turned down Thomas's pitch for a Jason X novel but accepted his proposal for one based on A Nightmare on Elm Street, "which had a little bit of a SF spin to it." The concept of combining science fiction with horror by setting a Nightmare on Elm Street story "a couple years in the future" was suggested to Thomas by Black Flame associate editor Mark Newton. The novel, Thomas's first mass-market release, was, according to Thomas, "a blast to write" and "an exciting challenge" in which he was able to "bring my own imagination to the task of writing a story based on an established series." When it came to writing Freddy Krueger, Thomas took inspiration from the 2003 film Freddy vs. Jason, specifically the film establishing Freddy needing to be remembered to retain his power; paced Freddy's appearances to build suspense and to not water down the character's impact; and characterized Freddy as having a "nasty" and "smugly self-amused" sense of humor comparable to the demon (Pazuzu) from William Peter Blatty's 1971 novel The Exorcist.

== Reception ==
Don D'Ammassa of Chronicle commended the novel, calling it "quite readable" and further commenting, "Thomas has proven himself to be an interesting writer, particularly at shorter length, and here demonstrates his ability to take an existing theme and do something new with it." Similarly, Louis Fowler of Bookgasm opined that the book's plot was "brilliant in its simplicity" and concluded, "Thomas has written a great read, one that, while using familiar characters, works so well on its own that [it] would be an incredible way to bring the franchise back to life if it ever hit the silver screen."
