= Christa Faust =

American author

Christa Faust (born June 21, 1969, in New York City) is an American author who writes original novels, as well as novelizations and media tie-ins. Faust won the 2009 Crimespree Award (Best Original Paperback) for Money Shot. Money Shot also received nominations for Best Paperback Original from the Edgar Awards, Anthony Awards, and Barry Awards.

== Bibliography ==
=== Novels ===
- Control Freak (1998)
- Hoodtown (2004)
- Triads (2004) (with Poppy Z. Brite)
- Money Shot (2008)
- Hunt Beyond the Frozen Fire (2010)
- Choke Hold (2011)
- Butch Fatale, Dyke Dick: Double-D Double Cross (2012)

=== Novelizations and media tie-ins ===
- A Nightmare on Elm Street: Dreamspawn (2005)
- The Twilight Zone: Burned / One Night at Mercy (2005)
- Final Destination 3 (2006)
- Friday the 13th: The Jason Strain (2006)
- Snakes on a Plane (2006) (Winner of the Scribe Award for Best Adapted novel in 2007.)
- Supernatural: Coyote's Kiss (2011)
- Fringe: The Zodiac Paradox (2013)
- Fringe: The Burning Man (2013)
- Fringe: Sins of the Father (2013)
- Batman: The Killing Joke (2018)

== Filmography ==
- The Shining (1997)
- Dita in Distress (1999)
- Girl Trouble (2001)
- Payne for Hire (2002)
- Rope Sluts (2004)
- Never Sleep Again: The Elm Street Legacy (2010)
- April Flores World (2012)

The Hunger episode "Skin Deep" was adapted from Faust's 1995 short story "Skin Deep."
