= A Nightmare on Elm Street: Dreamspawn =

2005 novel by Christa Faust

- Author: Christa Faust
- Language: English
- Series: A Nightmare on Elm Street
- Release number: 2
- Genre: Horror
- Publisher: Black Flame (UK); Simon & Schuster (US)
- Publication date: 26 April 2005
- Publication place: United Kingdom
- Media type: Print (Paperback)
- Pages: 407
- ISBN: 9781844161737
- OCLC: 57527052
- Preceded by: A Nightmare on Elm Street: Suffer the Children
- Followed by: A Nightmare on Elm Street: Protégé

A Nightmare on Elm Street: Dreamspawn is a 2005 British horror novel written by Christa Faust and published by Black Flame. A tie-in to the Nightmare on Elm Street series of American horror films, it is the second in a series of five Nightmare on Elm Street novels published by Black Flame and focuses on a group of high school girls who summon and attempt to control supernatural killer Freddy Krueger.

== Plot ==
Seven-year-old Rose Gibson lives in Bakersfield, California, with her negligent drug addict mother, Laurie, and sexually abusive father, Ed Parker, a drunk who once made Rose watch as he killed her pet dog, Pepper. One night, the Gibson household is visited by Freddy Krueger, a serial child killer who, after being burned to death by angry parents, now haunts the Dream World. Freddy murders Laurie and Ed but fails to kill Rose.

Eleven years later, Jane DeHaan moves to Southern California. Jane, a teenager whose father died of AML, is an insecurely overweight goth who adores the Victorian era. Jane is bullied at Hemingway High, where her main tormentor is a promiscuous and alcoholic cheerleader named Amber Dunn. After Jane befriends Lola Cole, a punk horror film fan, the two kidnap an inebriated Amber and check her in to a rehab clinic as a prank on her and her three sycophants, Ashley, Kayla, and Shayne. When Amber returns, she is rejected by the other cheerleaders and thanks Jane and Lola for helping her overcome her addiction, befriending them, and confiding in them about how she was rendered infertile by a botched abortion; the three outcasts are nicknamed the "Petticoat Mafia." Jane also becomes romantically involved with and loses her virginity to a member of the school's wrestling team, an artist named Brandon Ortiz.

Rose, having become a self-harming misanthrope since her parents' deaths, transfers to Hemingway High and joins the Petticoat Mafia. After attending a party alone, Rose tells her new friends she was gangraped by the wrestling team and talks the other girls into helping her get revenge by performing a ritual to summon Freddy. The ceremony, held in the abandoned factory where Freddy was once employed, works, with Rose coercing Freddy into doing her bidding by withholding the bladed glove Freddy wielded in life as the "Springwood Slasher." After Freddy murders every member of the wrestling team besides Brandon, it is revealed Rose lied about being raped in order to get the Petticoat Mafia to help her revive Freddy, whom Rose has been obsessed with since childhood, wanting to use Freddy to commit a grandiose murder–suicide that entails detonating a bomb full of knockout gas in Hemingway High. With everyone in the school knocked out by the gas, a massive shared dream forms in which Freddy begins killing people by the dozens, including Amber and Lola, the latter of whom has her brain eaten by Freddy after he traps her in a nightmare recreation of Night of the Living Dead.

Freddy, after mocking Rose for believing she was "special" and could control him through his glove, murders Brandon and attacks Jane. Rose rips Freddy's heart out and incinerates it, the glove, and herself in a furnace, which vanquishes Freddy. Jane is confined indefinitely to a psychiatric hospital, where she spends all of her time staring blankly at a TV, after the Petticoat Mafia is blamed for the 461 deaths that occurred at Hemingway.

== Publication ==
Author Christa Faust celebrated the book's release with a signing at the Dark Delicacies bookstore in Burbank, California, on June 12, 2005.

In 2006, Black Flame reprinted Dreamspawn as part of Ripped From a Dream: A Nightmare on Elm Street Omnibus, a compilation that included Suffer the Children and Protégé, the preceding and subsequent Nightmare on Elm Street novels published by Black Flame.

== Reception ==
In a dual review of Dreamspawn and its predecessor, Suffer the Children, Don D'Ammassa wrote for Chronicle, he concluded; "I wasn't really surprised by anything in either book, but both are quite suspenseful and do a good job of capturing the atmosphere of their inspiration." Writing for The Boar, Reece Goodall lambasted the novel, which he noted felt like "a poor high school drama, full of caricatures of teenagers" and "two very different stories awkwardly stapled together."
