= David Bishop (writer) =

New Zealand screenwriter and author

- Born: New Zealand
- Occupations: Editor, comic book writer, novelist
- Writing career
- Period: 1991–present
- Genres: Comic book, science fiction
- Website: viciousimagery.blogspot.com

David James Steven Bishop (born 27 September 1966), also known as D. V. Bishop, is a New Zealand comic book editor and writer of comics, novels and screenplays. He lives in the United Kingdom.

In the 1990s he edited the UK comics titles Judge Dredd Megazine (1991–2002) and 2000 AD (1995–2000). He has since become a prolific screenwriter and novelist, and has won awards for his Cesare Aldo mystery novels which are set in Renaissance Florence.

== Biography ==
Bishop was born in Cambridge, New Zealand and grew up in Auckland. He studied journalism at Auckland Technical Institute (now Auckland University of Technology), and worked as a journalist for the New Zealand Herald. He emigrating to the UK in 1990.

He completed an MA in Screenwriting at Scotland's Edinburgh Napier University in Scotland in 2007. He helped establish the university's MA Creative Writing programme in 2009, which he headed from 2017 to 2022. He remains a creative writing lecturer for the programme. In 2017, he began a PhD in Creative Writing at England's Lancaster University, for which he wrote the historical thriller City of Vengeance (Pan Macmillan, 2021). His coming thesis examines the scarcity of LGBTQ+ sleuths in historical mystery fiction.

In 2017, he was awarded a Robert Louis Stevenson Fellowship by Creative Scotland and the Scottish Book Trust.

In 2008, he appeared on 23 May edition of the BBC One quiz show The Weakest Link, beating eight other contestants to win more than £1500 in prize money.

In September 2025, Bishop was a guest on the Off the Shelf podcast as part of a feature on the McIlvanney Prize.

== Comics ==
Bishop was sub-editor of the Judge Dredd Megazine and of Crisis, before becoming the editor of the Megazine from 1991 to 2002. He became the editor of 2000 AD just before Christmas 1995, staying four and a half years before resigning to become a freelance writer in the summer of 2000.

Bishop was responsible for discovering many new British talents, including:

- Andy Diggle
- Robbie Morrison
- Siku
- Frank Quitely
- Dean Ormston
- Chris Halls (comics pseudonym of video director Chris Cunningham)
- Simon Fraser
- Jim Murray

He also edited Judge Dredd – Lawman of the Future and, with collaborator Roger Langridge, contributed the insane asylum-set strip The Straitjacket Fits in the Megazine.

Since leaving 2000 AD in the year 2000, Bishop has enjoyed a successful career as a freelance writer, working on novels of Doctor Who (including Who Killed Kennedy, a journalist's point-of-view on the early Third Doctor stories), Judge Dredd, Heroes and Nikolai Dante, as well as comic strip adventures of The Phantom.

The Spacegirls, a parody of the Spice Girls, is on the list of 2000 AD's 20 Worst Strips as chosen by fan rating on the official website.

Away from British comics, his work on The Phantom has won awards for the "Best Phantom story of the year" for European comic publisher Egmont several times. Bishop introduced new characters to the Phantom mythos, such as the pirate queen Kate Sommerset, who grew so popular with readers that Bishop made her the main character of five stories.

In 2006, Bishop also signed on to participate in the writing of stories for American publisher Moonstone Books' two collections of Phantom short stories, called Phantom Prose Anthologies.

Bishop's history of 2000 AD, in a series of articles under the name Thrill Power Overload, was revised, expanded and updated in a book version published in 2007 to coincide with the 30th anniversary of 2000 AD. After that sold out, a paperback edition was issued in February 2009. An expanded edition with new material by Karl Stock was released in 2017.

== Scriptwriting ==
Bishop received his first drama scriptwriting credit when BBC Radio 4 broadcast his radio play Island Blue: Ronald in June 2006. In 2007, he won the PAGE International Screenwriting Award in the short film category for his script Danny's Toys, and was a finalist in the 2009 PAGE Awards with his script The Woman Who Screamed Butterflies.

In 2010, Bishop received his first TV drama credit on the BBC medical drama series Doctors, writing an episode called A Pill For Every Ill, broadcast on 10 February.

In 2020 he won the Sir Julius Vogel Award for Best Dramatic Presentation for his audiobook, The Elysian Blade.

== Historical fiction ==
Moving away from science fiction, in 2021 he released his first historical fiction novel under the name D. V. Bishop. City of Vengeance, the first book in the Cesare Aldo mystery series, is set in Florence in the 1530s. He wrote the book as part of a PhD in Creative Writing at Lancaster University in England; his thesis examines the scarcity of LGBTQ+ sleuths in historical mystery fiction. The novel won the 2022 New Zealand Booklovers Award for Best Adult Novel. It was described by the judges as: "A stunning debut novel [which] seamlessly blends historical fiction with crime thriller... Storytelling centred on intrigue and betrayal doesn't come more polished and captivating than this."

The second novel, The Darkest Sin, won the 2023 Crime Writers' Association Historical Dagger.

The third novel, Ritual of Fire, won the 2024 Ngaio Marsh Award for best New Zealand crime novel.

The fourth novel, A Divine Fury was a finalist for the 2024 McIlvanney Prize in Scotland.

The fifth Aldo novel, Carnival of Lies, was published in 2025.

The sixth novel in the series, Shadow of Madness, was published in 2026.

A seventh novel, The True Confession of Contessa Coltello, will be published in 2027.

== Bibliography ==
=== Comics ===
- The Straitjacket Fits (with Roger Langridge):
  - "The Straitjacket Fits" (in Judge Dredd Megazine #1.09-1.20, 1991–1992)
  - "The Final Fit" (in Judge Dredd Yearbook 1993 1992)
- Soul Sisters (with co-writer Dave Stone and artist Shaky Kane, in Judge Dredd Megazine vol.2 ##2-9 & 1993 Judge Dredd Yearbook, 1992)
- Strontium Dogs: "Hate & War" (pseudonymous rewrites, in 2000 AD ##993-999, 1996)
- Vector 13: "Case Ten: Case Closed?" (uncredited, with Simon Davis, in 2000 AD #1032, 1997)
- B.L.A.I.R. 1: "B.L.A.I.R. 1" (with co-writer Steve MacManus and artist Simon Davis, in 2000 AD #1034, 1997)
- Dan Dare: "Dan Dare 3000AD" (with co-writer Steve MacManus and artist Kev Walker, in 2000 AD #1034, 1997)
- Flesh: "Flesh 3000AD" (with co-writer Steve MacManus and artist Carl Critchlow, in 2000 AD #1034, 1997)
- Harlem Heroes: "Hike Harlem Heroes" (with co-writer Steve MacManus and artist Jason Brashill, in 2000 AD #1034, 1997)
- Invasion: "Invasion! 3000AD" (with co-writer Steve MacManus and artist Henry Flint, in 2000 AD #1034, 1997)
- The Spacegirls (development & uncredited co-writer, with Jason Brashill, in 2000 AD ##1062-1066, 1997)
- A Life Less Ordinary (uncredited, with Steve Yeowell, in 2000 AD ##1063-1070, 1997)
- Pulp Sci-Fi: "Water of Life" (as "James Stevens", with David Bircham, in 2000 AD #1098, 1998)
- Past Imperfect: "Nixon Must Die!" (as "James Stevens", with Neil Edwards, in 2000 AD #1315, 2002)
- Dead Men Walking (as "James Stevens", with Boo Cook, in 2000 AD ##1362-1370, 2003)
- The Phantom (Swedish Fantomen magazine #26/2001, ##15 & 22/2002, ##8, 16 & 26/2003, ##7, 12, 16, 23, 24 & 26/2004, ##1, 10, 13, 17 & 18/2005, ##8, 9, 16, 19, 20 & 25/2006, ##1, 10, 16, 20 & 26/2007, ##1, 4, 9, 13, 20 & 24/2008, ##1/2009)
- Fiends of the Eastern Front: "Stalingrad" (with Colin MacNeil, in Judge Dredd Megazine 245–252, 2006)

=== Novels ===
==== As David Bishop ====
- Judge Dredd:
  - The Savage Amusement (Virgin Books, August 1993, ISBN 0-352-32874-6)
  - Cursed Earth Asylum (Virgin Books, December 1993, ISBN 0-352-32893-2)
  - Silencer (Virgin Books, November 1994, ISBN 0-352-32960-2)
  - Bad Moon Rising (Black Flame, June 2004, ISBN 1-84416-107-2)
  - Kingdom of the Blind (Black Flame, November 2004, ISBN 1-84416-133-1)
- Doctor Who:
  - Who Killed Kennedy (with "James Stevens", Virgin Books, April 1996, ISBN 0-426-20467-0)
  - Amorality Tale (BBC Books, April 2002, ISBN 0-563-53850-3)
  - The Domino Effect (BBC Books, February 2003, ISBN 0-563-53869-4)
  - Empire of Death (BBC Books, March 2004, ISBN 0-563-48615-5)
- Nikolai Dante:
  - From Russia with Lust: The Nikolai Dante Omnibus (672 pages, March 2007, ISBN 1-84416-454-3) collects:
    - The Strangelove Gambit (January 2005, ISBN 1-84416-139-0)
    - Imperial Black (August 2005, ISBN 1-84416-180-3)
    - Honour Be Damned (March 2006, ISBN 1-84416-324-5)
- A Nightmare on Elm Street: Suffer the Children (Black Flame, May 2005, ISBN 1-84416-172-2)
- Fiends of the Eastern Front:
  - Fiends of the Eastern Front (672 pages, February 2007, ISBN 1-84416-455-1) collects:
    - Operation Vampyr (December 2005, ISBN 1-84416-274-5)
    - The Blood Red Army (April 2006, ISBN 1-84416-325-3)
    - Twilight of the Dead (August 2006, ISBN 1-84416-384-9)
  - Fiends of the Rising Sun (July 2007, ISBN 1-84416-494-2)
- Warhammer Fantasy:
  - A Murder in Marienburg (416 pages, Black Library, May 2007, ISBN 1-84416-474-8)
  - A Massacre in Marienburg (416 pages, Black Library, December 2008, ISBN 978-1-84416-670-1)

==== As D. V. Bishop ====
The Cesare Aldo mysteries:

- City of Vengeance (416 pages, Pan MacMillan, February 2021, ISBN 978-1-52903-877-4)
- The Darkest Sin (Pan MacMillan, 2023)
- Ritual of Fire (Pan MacMillan, 2024)
- A Divine Fury (Pan MacMillan, 2024)
- Carnival of Lies (Pan MacMillan, 2025)
- Shadow of Madness (Pan MacMillan, 2026)
- The True Confession of Contessa Coltello (Pan MacMillan, upcoming 2027)

=== Audio dramas ===
- Sarah Jane Smith: Buried Secrets (2006, Big Finish Productions)
- Sarah Jane Smith: Snow Blind (2006, Big Finish Productions)
- Sarah Jane Smith: Fatal Consequences (2006, Big Finish Productions)
- Sarah Jane Smith: Dreamland (2006, Big Finish Productions)
- Sarah Jane Smith: Test of Nerve (2002, Big Finish Productions)
- Doctor Who Unbound: Full Fathom Five (2003, Big Finish Productions)
- Doctor Who – Enemy of the Daleks (2009, Big Finish Productions)
- Sapphire and Steel: All Fall Down (2005, Big Finish Productions)
- Judge Dredd — Wanted: Dredd or Alive (Big Finish Productions)
- Judge Dredd — War Crimes (Big Finish Productions)
- Judge Dredd — Death Trap! (Big Finish Productions)
- Judge Dredd — The Big Shot! (Big Finish Productions)
- Judge Dredd — Get Karter! (Big Finish Productions)
- The Elysian Blade (BBC Audio, 2019)

=== Non-fiction ===
- Bright Lights, Baked Ziti: The Sopranos Programme Guide (Virgin Books, 2001)
- Starring Michael Caine (Reynolds & Hearn, 2003)
- Thrill Power Overload (Rebellion Developments, 2007, ISBN 1-905437-22-6)
- Endeavour: The Complete Inspector Morse (Vicious Imagery, 2016)

== Notes ==
Preceded by Steve MacManus	Judge Dredd Megazine editor 1991–1996	Succeeded by John Tomlinson
Preceded by John Tomlinson	Judge Dredd Megazine editor 1996–2000	Succeeded by Andy Diggle
Preceded by Andy Diggle	Judge Dredd Megazine editor 2000–2002	Succeeded by Alan Barnes
Preceded by John Tomlinson	2000 AD editor 1996–2000	Succeeded by Andy Diggle
