= A Nightmare on Elm Street: Perchance to Dream =

2006 novel by Natasha Rhodes

- Author: Natasha Rhodes
- Language: English
- Series: A Nightmare on Elm Street
- Release number: 4
- Genre: Horror
- Publisher: Black Flame (UK); Simon & Schuster (US)
- Publication date: 28 February 2006
- Publication place: United Kingdom
- Media type: Print (Paperback)
- Pages: 412
- ISBN: 9781844163229
- OCLC: 62761341
- Preceded by: A Nightmare on Elm Street: Protégé
- Followed by: A Nightmare on Elm Street: The Dream Dealers
- Website: https://natasharhodes.wixsite.com/official-author-site/a-nightmare-on-elm-street-perchance--

A Nightmare on Elm Street: Perchance to Dream is a 2006 British horror novel written by Natasha Rhodes and published by Black Flame. A tie-in to the Nightmare on Elm Street series of American horror films, it is the fourth installment in a series of five Nightmare on Elm Street novels published by Black Flame and pits Jacob, a young man with the power to suppress the dreams of others, against supernatural killer Freddy Krueger.

== Plot ==
Alice Johnson's son, Jacob Johnson, has spent the last five years in Westin Hills Psychiatric Hospital, having been placed there when he was 13. Jacob was manipulated into killing his foster parents by Freddy Krueger, a serial child killer who, after being burned to death by angry parents, now haunts the dreams of the people of Springwood, Ohio. Jacob has telepathic abilities, which he has been using to suppress the dreams of Springwood's inhabitants to protect them from Freddy. After Freddy tricks him into killing four other Westin Hills patients, Jacob escapes from the asylum with help from his caseworker Jack Kane and goes on the run, pursued by the Springwood PD. Kane believes Jacob can help him steal Freddy's powers with a Deathstone. Freddy's powers were granted to him by Dream Demons, and the Deathstone, once activated by a human sacrifice, will make Kane the Dream Demons' new avatar, while Freddy will be left trapped in the Deathstone.

Upon entering Springwood, Doctor Sally Spencer, a psychiatrist brought in by the police to help deal with the disorder caused by the townspeople's inability to dream, is attacked by Freddy, who kills Sally's partner, Mitchell, and crashes her SUV. Sally abandons her vehicle and the Freddy and Jacob-related paperwork within it, which is found by Ella Harris, a reporter for Springwood High's student newspaper, and a delinquent named Mathew Irwin. Freddy murders Matt after manipulating him into calling his and Ella's classmates to tell them about Freddy, whose power, diminished due to a lack of fear from Springwood's populace to feed on, will be replenished as knowledge of him spreads among the children of Springwood. As Freddy picks off Ella's friends one by one, he orders her to kill Jacob. Ella and her remaining friends, Henry and Jennifer, are joined by Sally as they search for Jacob, who has been taken in by Kane.

Jacob reluctantly goes along with Kane's plan to sacrifice Sarah, a kidnapped Westin Hills patient, to activate the Deathstone. The ritual is interrupted by Ella's group and a trio of police officers, and, in the ensuing chaos, Freddy possesses Kane. Freddy slaughters Sarah, the officers, and Sally before Kane frees himself, having stolen half of Freddy's power; the two engage in a reality-warping duel on a runaway train, with Freddy emerging victorious, reclaiming his pilfered power, and killing Kane. Jacob tries to complete the Deathstone ritual with himself as the sacrifice by committing suicide but accidentally shoots Jen. Jacob then enters Freddy's mind, where Freddy shows off the captive souls of all of his victims, including Alice. In desperation, Jacob blasts Freddy with all of Springwood's pent-up dream energy, which frees all of the tortured souls and overwhelms Freddy, who explodes and is banished back to the Dream World. Ella's, Henry's, and Jacob's victory celebration is short-lived, as all three of them are arrested and committed to Westin Hills, where Jacob, as he falls into a drug-induced slumber, is taunted by Freddy.

== Reception ==
Louis Fowler of Bookgasm felt Perchance to Dream suffered from drawbacks like too many uninteresting characters, awkward pacing, and Freddy Krueger being relegated to "second-banana" status but still had a "great" premise and was "entertaining enough, showing extreme promise for the series." The California Bookwatch, in a dual review of Perchance to Dream and Fear the Darkness, commended the former, noting, "Prior fans of Nightmare on Elm Street will relish this new thriller."
