= A Nightmare on Elm Street: Suffer the Children =

2005 novel by David Bishop

- Author: David Bishop
- Language: English
- Series: A Nightmare on Elm Street
- Release number: 1
- Genre: Horror
- Publisher: Black Flame (UK); Simon & Schuster (US)
- Publication date: 26 April 2005
- Publication place: United Kingdom
- Media type: Print (Paperback)
- Pages: 404
- ISBN: 9781844161720
- OCLC: 61259479
- Followed by: A Nightmare on Elm Street: Dreamspawn

A Nightmare on Elm Street: Suffer the Children is a 2005 British horror novel written by David Bishop and published by Black Flame. A tie-in to the Nightmare on Elm Street series of American horror films, it is the first in a series of five Nightmare on Elm Street novels published by Black Flame and involves a group of teenagers who, after taking part in an anti-insomnia drug trial, find themselves being terrorized by supernatural killer Freddy Krueger.

== Plot ==
Alexandra Marie Corwin, a teenager with a history of self-harm brought on by her father abandoning her, has moved to Springwood, Ohio, with her mother, Joyce. The Corwins' new home, 1428 Elm Street, once belonged to Freddy Krueger, a serial child rapist and killer who, after being burned to death by angry parents, now haunts the Dream World. Alex begins having nightmares about Freddy, including at school, and while in detention she meets Peter O'Mahoney, an oft-bullied nerd who is being beaten by his father; Christopher Harris, an African American athlete whose father is constantly pressuring him to succeed; Heather Sutherland, a bulimic beauty queen whose alcoholic mother is living vicariously through her; Lloyd Reeves, a stoner and drug dealer; and Katherine Walker, a rebellious goth whose parents are fundamentalist Christians. Lloyd convinces the other students to skip school the next day to participate in a paid anti-insomnia drug trial being held at the Katja Institute.

During the trial, Freddy attacks the teens in their dreams, mutilating Lloyd severely enough that he falls into a coma after being rushed to Springwood General Hospital. Afterward, the other teens discover Freddy used the experimental drug to grant them supernatural powers, which he demands they use to kill people in his name, telling them, "You kill for me, or I will kill you." As the quintet tries to resist Freddy, Alex and Peter become romantically involved, as do Chris and Heather, despite their fears of racist backlash from Chris's respectability politics-obsessed father, Gideon, and Heather's "white trash" mother, Tammy. After Freddy murders Kat, one of the remaining teens betrays the others and gives in to Freddy's demands, killing Peter's father, Chris's family, and Heather. These murders empower Freddy enough that he is able to use Lloyd's body as a conduit to physically manifest in Springwood General. As Freddy butchers the hospital's patients and staff, attracting police attention, he is confronted by Alex, Chris, and Peter. Freddy kills Chris, and Alex accidentally stabs Peter, who dies while expressing remorse over being the one who sided with Freddy. Alex is knocked out by Freddy and, in the Dream World, encounters Lloyd, who implores her to mercy kill him while he distracts Freddy. Alex wakes up and stabs Lloyd's body before being subdued by Sheriff Williams. With Peter and Lloyd dead and no longer able to act as his anchors in the waking world, Freddy is once again relegated to the Dream World.

Springwood officials suppress Freddy's involvement in the murders as part of a cover-up in which all the deaths are blamed on Alex. Alex, having become catatonic after suffering a psychotic break, is judged unfit to stand trial and confined indefinitely to Westin Hills Psychiatric Hospital. Freddy briefly possesses an orderly to visit Alex, who is revealed to be pregnant with Freddy's son, the result of Alex losing her virginity to Peter while Peter was secretly possessed by Freddy.

== Publication ==
After Black Flame acquired the license to produce tie-in novels to New Line Cinema's Nightmare on Elm Street series of horror films, author David Bishop submitted a pitch for Suffer the Children to Black Flame in September 2003 and, eight months later, was contracted to write a 95,000-word novel by the company after the pitch was approved by New Line Cinema. Bishop's influences for the story included the 1980 Stephen King novel Firestarter and the script for an unproduced Nightmare on Elm Street sequel written by Peter Jackson. Bishop initially struggled with the writing process, having compared the synopsis he wrote for Suffer the Children to "the instructions of a confused dyslexic with Tourette's Syndrome after too many beers."

In 2006, Black Flame reprinted Suffer the Children as part of Ripped From a Dream: A Nightmare on Elm Street Omnibus, a compilation that included Dreamspawn and Protégé, the two subsequent Nightmare on Elm Street novels published by Black Flame.

=== Sequel ===
Bishop plotted a sequel to the novel, titled House of 100 Maniacs, which would have seen the return of Alex Corwin, the protagonist of Suffer the Children. Bishop submitted a proposal for House of 100 Maniacs to Black Flame and New Line Cinema, both of whom responded positively to it, but the book went unpublished due to the flagging sales of the New Line Cinema spin-off novels published by Black Flame. Bishop posted the outline for House of 100 Maniacs on his personal blog in November 2006.

== Reception ==
In a dual review of Suffer the Children and its successor, Dreamspawn, Don D'Ammassa wrote for Chronicle, he concluded; "I wasn't really surprised by anything in either book, but both are quite suspenseful and do a good job of capturing the atmosphere of their inspiration." Writing for The Boar, Reece Goodall criticized the book for having "very predictable" kills and expressed frustration over the cliffhanger ending but found the novel to be an otherwise "solid read" with "generally good" characterization and a "well-written" Freddy Krueger. In a review written for Rue Morgue, Joel Harley felt the book's characters were "well-drawn and distinct" and that the novel was "a faithful working" of the source material but also opined that the dream sequences being so "grounded" was "a missed opportunity in the limitless budget afforded by the medium" and that, when it came to Freddy Krueger, author David Bishop struggled "to find the character's voice" even if he did succeed "in making Freddy scary again."
