= Grupo Protege =

Grupo Protege S/A
- Company type: Sociedade Anônima
- Industry: Security
- Founded: 1971
- Area served: Brazil
- Key people: Marcelo Baptista de Oliveira
- Services: Cash in transit operations, security technologies and manned guarding
- Net income: R$1,6 billion (2014)
- Number of employees: 23,000 (2015)
- Website: protege.com.br/en/

Grupo Protege S/A or simply Protege is a Brazilian private security company, based on the city of São Paulo, Brazil.

”Protege" is Portuguese for "protects" (third person indicative present conjugation of the verb "protect").

== History ==
The company was originally founded on the city São Paulo by a group of people in 1971, eventually being purchased and renamed as "Protege" by the current CEO Marcelo Baptista de Oliveira in 1979. The company has thrived through the Brazilian currency transitions between the cruzeiro, the cruzado and finally, the real. Currently, it only operates in Brazil and offers coverage in 14 Brazilian states (including the Federal District).

In August 2010, it was present in a ranking of the Brazilian business magazine ISTOÉ Dinheiro. Protege was in the 4th position in the Financial Sustainability category, in the miscellaneous segment, being the only private security company in this category. In May 2017, it was mentioned as the "best private security agency" in the state of São Paulo, for the third consecutive year.

=== Operations ===
Protege's main services include cash in transit operations and logistics with the use of armored vehicles, manned guarding and maintenance in private properties and airports, security personnel training and electronic security.

=== Social responsibility ===
Protege is one of the companies that joined the Sócio Investidor (Investor Associate) program of the Brazilian child cancer institute GRAACC, in 2011, funding researches and campaigns along with other companies.
