= A Nightmare on Elm Street: Protégé =

2005 novel by Tim Waggoner

- Author: Tim Waggoner
- Language: English
- Series: A Nightmare on Elm Street
- Release number: 3
- Genre: Horror
- Publisher: Black Flame (UK); Simon & Schuster (US)
- Publication date: 27 September 2005
- Publication place: United Kingdom
- Media type: Print (Paperback)
- Pages: 409
- ISBN: 9781844162550
- OCLC: 65201174
- Preceded by: A Nightmare on Elm Street: Dreamspawn
- Followed by: A Nightmare on Elm Street: Perchance to Dream
- Website: https://timwaggoner.com/writing/a-nightmare-on-elm-street-3-protege/

A Nightmare on Elm Street: Protégé is a 2005 British horror novel written by Tim Waggoner and published by Black Flame. A tie-in to the Nightmare on Elm Street series of American horror films, it is the third in a series of five Nightmare on Elm Street novels published by Black Flame and revolves around a teenager named Jerome Starkey as he attempts to prevent himself from falling under the thrall of supernatural killer Freddy Krueger.

== Plot ==
Expectant teenage mother Joanna Larkin falls asleep at the wheel and has a nightmare about Freddy Krueger, a serial child killer who, after being burned to death by angry parents, now haunts the dreams of the people of Springwood, Ohio. Freddy injects Joanna's unborn child with his evil essence before causing Joanna to die in a car crash, though Joanna's baby, Jerome, survives and is raised by his father, Don Starkey, and stepmother, Lynn. Growing up, Jerome is shielded from Freddy's influence by a dreamcatcher gifted to him by Joanna's twin sister, Rebecca, a tarot card reader who received the artifact from a being implied to be an angel during a trip to New Mexico. Jerome has a volatile temper and suffers from violent outbursts, such as crushing his pet gerbil, Kirby, and biting and permanently scarring Lynn and a bully named Patrick Cottril.

One night, Jerome accidentally damages the dreamcatcher and begins having nightmares about Freddy. Freddy's machinations cause Jerome to develop a malevolent alter ego who seizes control of his and Jerome's shared body whenever Jerome falls asleep, gaining power and further autonomy by murdering Cottril and the bully's two cohorts, Eddie Jackson and Brent Haney. Rebecca, after being made aware of Jerome's dilemma, attempts to save her nephew by repairing the dreamcatcher with help from Joanna, whose spirit Rebecca is briefly able to call forth during a visit to the Astral plane. Jerome's evil half destroys the dreamcatcher and murders Rebecca. Jerome, overcome with despair, attempts suicide by jumping in a river, but when he passes out in the water, his body is possessed by "Dark Jerome." Jerome's doppelganger then goes on a killing spree, butchering three of the staff of Jerome's school, his bosses at a video rental shop, and his best friend, Ellery Belasco, while Jerome's consciousness is trapped in the Dream World with Freddy.

Jerome, guided by Rebecca's spirit, escapes Freddy and stops Dark Jerome from killing Lynn and his stepsiblings but is unable to save Don. Dark Jerome takes back control of Jerome's body and kidnaps Jerome's girlfriend, Cheryl Garringer. Dark Jerome brings Cheryl to Freddy's old abandoned house, 1428 Elm Street. The house is where Freddy is at his strongest in the waking world, and, with Dark Jerome acting as a nexus, he is able to physically manifest there, intent on helping his "son" slaughter Cheryl. Jerome reassumes control of his body and attacks Freddy. As Freddy lashes out, Jerome swaps places with Dark Jerome, who is accidentally killed by Freddy. Jerome, now a disembodied spirit, forces Freddy back into the Dream World before saying goodbye to Cheryl. At Jerome's funeral, Cheryl laments that, even though Dark Jerome was destroyed, depriving Freddy of an agent in the mortal plane, it was a pyrrhic victory since Jerome and eleven others are dead and Jerome was blamed for Dark Jerome's rampage, which has produced a surplus of fear for Freddy to feed on and use to continue terrorizing Springwood.

== Publication ==
In his initial pitch to Black Flame for a Nightmare on Elm Street tie-in novel, author Tim Waggoner had Freddy Krueger become mortal again and attempt to reclaim his position of power in the Dream World. Waggoner, encouraged by his editor, had already begun writing this story when he was informed by a representative from New Line Cinema, the owners of the Nightmare on Elm Street franchise, that it had been rejected because the concept of Freddy becoming human again would "raise the specter of Freddie [sic] having been a child molester/murderer when he was alive and they didn’t want to deal with that issue." Waggoner then wrote and presented Black Flame with an outline for Protégé, which was approved by New Line Cinema. To promote the book, Waggoner read the first chapter of it at the World Horror Convention in New York City in April 2005. In a 2018 article written for Apex Magazine, Waggoner revealed Protégé included "subtle commentary" about how, over the years, Freddy had gone from being "a figure of terror" to "a wise-cracking" antihero, Waggoner stating, "I provided a reason in my story for why Freddy wore this less-threatening mask to disguise the insanely terrifying darkness that was his true self."

In 2006, Black Flame reprinted Protégé as part of Ripped From a Dream: A Nightmare on Elm Street Omnibus, a compilation that included Suffer the Children and Dreamspawn, the two preceding Nightmare on Elm Street novels published by Black Flame.

== Reception ==
Don D'Ammassa opined that Protégé was "quite well written" in a dual review of it and Final Destination: Dead Man's Hand he wrote for Chronicle. Reece Goodall of The Boar commended the novel, which he felt had "a really interesting main character and some solid horror" as well as an intriguing premise that set it apart from its two predecessors, Suffer the Children and Dreamspawn.
