= A Nightmare on Elm Street (franchise) =

American supernatural slasher franchise

- Official franchise logo
- Created by: Wes Craven
- Original work: A Nightmare on Elm Street (1984)
- Owner: Warner Bros. Entertainment (Skydance) (Note: Warner Bros. Entertainment, through New Line Cinema, own the rights to the franchise and the international rights to the 1984 film screenplay, while the estate of Wes Craven own the domestic rights to the 1984 film screenplay and licensed them to Paramount Pictures in 2026. Since 2026, both are subsidiaries of Skydance.)
- Years: 1984–present

Print publications
- Book: Behind the Screams (2018)
- Novels: A Nightmare on Elm Street: Suffer the Children (2005); A Nightmare on Elm Street: Dreamspawn (2005); A Nightmare on Elm Street: Protégé (2005); A Nightmare on Elm Street: Perchance to Dream (2006); A Nightmare on Elm Street: The Dream Dealers (2006)
- Comics: A Nightmare on Elm Street

Films and television
- Films: A Nightmare on Elm Street (1984); A Nightmare on Elm Street 2: Freddy's Revenge (1985); A Nightmare on Elm Street 3: Dream Warriors (1987); A Nightmare on Elm Street 4: The Dream Master (1988); A Nightmare on Elm Street 5: The Dream Child (1989); Freddy's Dead: The Final Nightmare (1991); Wes Craven's New Nightmare (1994); Freddy vs. Jason (2003); A Nightmare on Elm Street (2010)
- Television series: Freddy's Nightmares (1988–1990)
- Direct-to-video: Never Sleep Again: The Elm Street Legacy (2010)

Games
- Video game: A Nightmare on Elm Street (1990)

Audio
- Soundtracks: Freddy vs. Jason (2003); Freddy vs. Jason score (2003); A Nightmare on Elm Street (2010)
- Original music: Dream Warriors; Are You Ready for Freddy; A Nightmare on My Street; Nightmare; I'm Awake Now

Miscellaneous
- Character(s): List of characters

A Nightmare on Elm Street is an American supernatural slasher media franchise consisting of nine films, a television series, novels, comic books, and various other media. The franchise began with the film A Nightmare on Elm Street (1984), written and directed by Wes Craven. The overall plot of the franchise centers around the fictional character Freddy Krueger, the apparition of a former child killer who was burned alive by the vengeful parents of his victims, who returns from the grave to terrorize and kill the teenage residents of the fictional Springwood, Ohio in their dreams. Craven returned to the franchise to co-script the second sequel, A Nightmare on Elm Street 3: Dream Warriors (1987), and to write and direct Wes Craven's New Nightmare (1994). The films collectively grossed $472 million at the box office worldwide.

The original film was released in 1984. A series of sequels produced by the independent film company New Line Cinema followed. New Line often attributes the growth of their company to the success of the Nightmare series. The film series as a whole has received mixed reviews by critics, but has been a financial success at the box office. When comparing the United States box office grosses of other American horror film series, A Nightmare on Elm Street is the third highest grossing series in adjusted US dollars. In 1988, a television series was produced with Freddy as the host. The pilot episode focused on the night Freddy was burned alive by the angry parents of the children he had killed, though the rest of the series featured episodes with independent plots. Twelve novels, separate from the adaptations of the films, and multiple comic book series were published featuring Freddy Krueger, as well as a crossover film featuring fellow horror icon Jason Voorhees from the Friday the 13th franchise. A remake of the 1984 film was released in 2010. In 2026, it was revealed that after a 16-year period of inactivity following the negative reception of the 2010 Platinum Dunes remake, Paramount Pictures would be reviving the film series, working with the Wes Craven estate to craft a new film project under Paramount's new label, Paramount Primal.

== Films ==
Film	U.S. release date	Directed by	Screenwriter(s)	Story by	Produced by
Original series
A Nightmare on Elm Street	November 9, 1984	Wes Craven	Wes Craven	Wes Craven	Robert Shaye
A Nightmare on Elm Street 2: Freddy's Revenge	November 1, 1985	Jack Sholder	David Chaskin	David Chaskin	Robert Shaye
A Nightmare on Elm Street 3: Dream Warriors	February 27, 1987	Chuck Russell	Wes Craven, Bruce Wagner, Chuck Russell & Frank Darabont	Wes Craven & Bruce Wagner	Robert Shaye
A Nightmare on Elm Street 4: The Dream Master	August 19, 1988	Renny Harlin	Jim Wheat, Ken Wheat & Brian Helgeland	Brian Helgeland & William Kotzwinkle	Robert Shaye & Rachel Talalay
A Nightmare on Elm Street 5: The Dream Child	August 11, 1989	Stephen Hopkins	Leslie Bohem	John Skipp, Leslie Bohem & Craig Spector	Robert Shaye & Rupert Harvey
Freddy's Dead: The Final Nightmare	September 13, 1991	Rachel Talalay	Michael De Luca	Rachel Talalay	Aron Warner & Robert Shaye
Wes Craven's New Nightmare	October 14, 1994	Wes Craven	Wes Craven	Wes Craven	Marianne Maddalena
Freddy vs. Jason	August 15, 2003	Ronny Yu	Mark Swift & Damian Shannon	Mark Swift & Damian Shannon	Sean S. Cunningham
Remake
A Nightmare on Elm Street	April 30, 2010	Samuel Bayer	Wesley Strick & Eric Heisserer	Wesley Strick	Brad Fuller, Andrew Form & Michael Bay
TBA
Untitled film	TBA	TBA	TBA	TBA	J. D. Lifshitz, Raphael Margules, Marc Toberoff, Iya Labunka & Jonathan Craven

=== Overview ===
The original film, written and directed by Wes Craven and titled A Nightmare on Elm Street, was released in 1984. The story focuses on Freddy Krueger (Robert Englund) attacking Nancy Thompson (Heather Langenkamp) and her friends in their dreams, successfully killing all but Nancy, in fictional Springwood, Ohio. Krueger's backstory is revealed by Nancy's mother, Marge, who explains that he was a child murderer. The parents of Springwood killed Krueger after he was acquitted on a technicality. Nancy defeats Freddy by pulling him from the dream world and stripping him of his powers when she stops being afraid of him.

Freddy returns to possess the body of Jesse Walsh (Mark Patton), the new teenager living in Nancy Thompson's house, in 1985's A Nightmare on Elm Street 2: Freddy's Revenge. Jesse is temporarily saved by his girlfriend Lisa (Kim Myers), who helps him exorcise Krueger's spirit.

Wes Craven returned to write A Nightmare on Elm Street 3: Dream Warriors, released in 1987. In the second sequel, Freddy is systematically killing the last of the Elm Street children. The few remaining children have been placed in the Westin Hills Mental Institution for allegedly attempting suicide. Nancy Thompson arrives at Westin Hills as a new intern, and realizes the children are being killed by Freddy. With the help of Dr. Neil Gordon (Craig Wasson), Nancy helps Kristen Parker (Patricia Arquette), Joey (Rodney Eastman), Taryn (Jennifer Rubin), Kincaid (Ken Sagoes), and Will (Ira Heiden) find their dream powers, so they can kill Freddy once and for all. Neil, unknowingly until the end, meets the spirit of Freddy's mother, Amanda Krueger (Nan Martin), who instructs him to bury Freddy's remains in hallowed ground in order to stop him for good. Neil completes his task, but not before Freddy kills Nancy.

The story of Kristen Parker would continue with 1988's A Nightmare on Elm Street 4: The Dream Master. This time, Kristen (Tuesday Knight) unwittingly releases Freddy, who immediately kills Kincaid and Joey. Before Freddy can kill Kristen, she transfers her dream powers to Alice Johnson (Lisa Wilcox), a friend from school. Alice begins inadvertently providing victims for Freddy when she begins pulling people into her dreams while she sleeps. Alice, who begins taking on traits of the friends who were murdered, confronts Freddy. She uses the power of the Dream Master to release all the souls Freddy has taken; they subsequently rip themselves from Freddy's body, killing him in the process.

Picking up shortly after the events of The Dream Master, A Nightmare on Elm Street 5: The Dream Child involves Freddy using Alice's unborn child, Jacob (Whitby Hertford), to resurrect himself and find new victims. The spirit of Amanda Krueger (Beatrice Boepple) returns, revealing that Freddy was conceived when she, a nun working in a mental asylum, was accidentally locked in a room with "100 maniacs" and raped "hundreds of times". Amanda Krueger convinces Jacob to use the powers he was given by Freddy against him, which gives her the chance to subdue Freddy long enough for Alice and Jacob to escape the dream world.

Two years later, 1991's Freddy's Dead: The Final Nightmare followed the exploits of "John Doe" (Shon Greenblatt), an amnesiac teenager from Springwood, who was sent out to find Freddy's daughter Maggie (Lisa Zane), who he needs to leave Springwood. Freddy's goal is to create new "Elm Streets", and begin a new killing spree after having killed all of the children in Springwood. Maggie, utilizing new dream techniques, uncovers Krueger's past, which include: being taunted by schoolmates for being the "son of 100 maniacs", being cruel to animals, beaten by his stepfather, the murder of his own wife when she discovers he has been killing children, and the moment when the Dream Demons arrive in his boiler room to make him the offer of eternal life. Eventually, Maggie pulls Freddy out of the dream world, and uses a pipe bomb to blow him up.

Wes Craven returned to the Nightmare series a third time with New Nightmare in 1994. This film focuses on a fictional "reality", where Craven, Langenkamp, and Englund all play themselves, and where the character of Freddy Krueger is really an evil entity that has been trapped in the realm of fiction by all the movies that have been made. Since the movies have stopped, the entity, which likes being Freddy Krueger, is trying to escape into the real world. The only person in its way is Heather Langenkamp, who the entity sees as "Nancy" – the first person who defeated him. Craven explains to Langenkamp the only way to keep the entity contained is for her to "play Nancy one last time". Langenkamp pursues "Krueger", who has kidnapped her son, into the dream world as "Nancy". There, she and her son trap Krueger in a furnace until he is finally destroyed.

In 2003, New Line pitted Friday the 13th's Jason Voorhees against Freddy Krueger. The film, Freddy vs. Jason, explains that Freddy Krueger has grown weak as people in Springwood, his home, have suppressed their fear of him. Freddy, who is impersonating Pamela Voorhees, the mother of Jason Voorhees, sends Jason (Ken Kirzinger) to Springwood to cause panic and fear. Jason accomplishes this, but refuses to stop killing. A battle ensues in both the dream world and Crystal Lake between the two villains. The winner is left ambiguous, as Jason surfaces from the lake holding Freddy's severed head, which winks and laughs.

In 2010, a remake of the original Nightmare on Elm Street was released. Here, Freddy (Jackie Earle Haley) stalks the dreams of Nancy Holbrook (Rooney Mara) and her friends as they discover that they all share a common link from their childhood; they were all molested by Freddy before he was murdered by their vengeful parents. Now a supernatural force in their dreams, Freddy kills off the children that alerted the parents about his transgressions. Freddy slowly works his way to Nancy, his favorite of the children, and manipulates her into going without sleep long enough that her body falls into a coma, resulting in permanent sleep and life with Freddy forever. Nancy is awakened when her friend Quentin (Kyle Gallner) injects adrenaline into her and pulls Freddy out of the dreamworld, where she and Quentin kill him and burn the remains of his body.

=== Development ===
The basis for the original Nightmare on Elm Street has been said to have been inspired by several newspaper articles printed in the LA Times in the 1970s on a group of Khmer refugees, who, after fleeing to America from the Khmer Rouge Genocide in Cambodia, were suffering disturbing nightmares after which they refused to sleep. Some of the men died in their sleep soon after. Medical authorities called the phenomenon "Asian Death Syndrome". The condition itself afflicted only men between the ages of 19-57 and is believed to be sudden unexplained death syndrome and/or Brugada syndrome. The 1970s pop song "Dream Weaver" by Gary Wright sealed the story for Craven, giving him not only an artistic setting to "jump off" from, but a synthesizer riff from the Elm Street soundtrack as well. It has also been stated that he drew some inspiration after studying Eastern religions.

Initially, Fred Krueger was intended to be a child molester, but Craven eventually decided to characterize him as a child murderer to avoid being accused of exploiting a spate of highly publicized child molestation cases that occurred in California around the time of production of the film. By Craven's account, his own adolescent experiences led to the naming of Fred Krueger. He had been bullied at school by a child named Fred Krueger, and named his villain accordingly. The colored sweater he chose for his villain was based on the DC Comics character Plastic Man, and Craven chose to make Krueger's sweater colors that of red and green, after reading an article in Scientific American in 1982 that said the two most clashing colors to the human retina were this particular combination.

Robert Englund has revealed that at a time, there was a serious development toward a prequel for Freddy's story called The First Kills, which would have been centered around two policemen chasing for the Springwood Slasher and two lawyers during the legal proceedings. Englund claims that John McNaughton was considered for directing the prequel, but these plans were forgotten after New Line Cinema was merged with Turner Broadcasting System in 1994. McNaughton came back later around the millennium shift and hoped to produce an alternative prequel story, alongside scriptwriter R.J. Tsarov, which would have been set in Hell, where McNaughton imagined Freddy to have been stuck in between his lynching and the events of the 1984 film. New Line Cinema rejected this idea due to the film Little Nicky (2000) having been partially set in Hell while also being a box-office bomb, deterring the company from producing another film set in Hell at that time.

On January 29, 2008, Variety reported that Michael Bay and his Platinum Dunes production company would be rebooting the Nightmare on Elm Street franchise with a remake of the original 1984 film. To provide a freshness to the character, producer Brad Fuller explained that they were abandoning the things that made the character less scary—Freddy would not be "cracking jokes" as had become a staple of his character in later sequels—and focus more on trying to craft a "horrifying movie". There was not agreement among the original crew as to whether it would be a good idea to remake the film. Craven expressed his displeasure, primarily because the filmmakers chose not to have him as a consultant to the film, unlike with the 2009 remake The Last House on the Left where he "shepherd[ed] it towards production". In contrast, Robert Englund felt it was time for A Nightmare on Elm Street to be remade. Englund liked the idea of being able to "exploit the dreamscape" with CGI and other technologies that did not exist when Craven was making the original Nightmare on Elm Street in 1984.

=== Box office ===
The Nightmare on Elm Street series, when compared to the other top-grossing American horror series—Halloween, Child's Play, Friday the 13th, Saw, Scream, and The Texas Chainsaw Massacre—and adjusting for 2023 inflation, is ranked third with $793.5 million. Halloween is the highest-grossing horror series in the United States at approximately $1.09 billion. Next in line is Friday the 13th at $908.4 million, The Scream film series is in fourth place with $779.5 million, followed by the Saw series with $688.3 million, The Texas Chainsaw Massacre with $459.7 million, and the Child's Play film series rounding out the list with $305.2 million.

Film	Year	Budget	Box office revenue			Reference
Film	Year	Budget	United States	Other territories	Worldwide	Reference
A Nightmare on Elm Street	1984	$1,800,000	$25,624,448	$31,560,686	$57,185,134	
A Nightmare on Elm Street 2: Freddy's Revenge	1985	$3,000,000	$29,999,213		$29,999,213	
A Nightmare on Elm Street 3: Dream Warriors	1987	$4,300,000–4,600,000	$44,793,222		$44,793,222	
A Nightmare on Elm Street 4: The Dream Master	1988	$6,500,000	$49,369,899		$49,369,899	
A Nightmare on Elm Street 5: The Dream Child	1989	$8,000,000	$22,168,359		$22,168,359	
Freddy's Dead: The Final Nightmare	1991	$9,000,000	$34,872,033		$34,872,033	
Wes Craven's New Nightmare	1994	$8,000,000	$18,090,181	$1,631,560	$19,721,741	
Freddy vs. Jason	2003	$30,000,000	$82,633,448	$34,009,973	$116,643,421	
A Nightmare on Elm Street	2010	$35,000,000	$63,075,011	$52,620,171	$115,695,182	
Total		$105,600,000–$105,900,000	$370,625,814	$119,822,390	$490,448,204	

=== Critical response ===
Film	Rotten Tomatoes	Metacritic	CinemaScore
A Nightmare on Elm Street (1984)	93% (71 reviews)	76 (12 reviews)	
A Nightmare on Elm Street 2: Freddy's Revenge	49% (37 reviews)	43 (6 reviews)	
A Nightmare on Elm Street 3: Dream Warriors	69% (68 reviews)	49 (11 reviews)	
A Nightmare on Elm Street 4: The Dream Master	56% (34 reviews)	56 (10 reviews)	
A Nightmare on Elm Street 5: The Dream Child	32% (38 reviews)	54 (11 reviews)	
Freddy's Dead: The Final Nightmare	23% (40 reviews)	39 (14 reviews)	
Wes Craven's New Nightmare	76% (51 reviews)	64 (21 reviews)	
Freddy vs. Jason	42% (214 reviews)	37 (29 reviews)	B+
A Nightmare on Elm Street (2010)	14% (184 reviews)	35 (25 reviews)	C+

=== Future ===
In August 2015, it was reported that Warner Bros. Pictures and New Line Cinema were developing a second remake with Orphan writer David Leslie Johnson, with Toby Emmerich, Walter Hamada and Dave Neustadter producing it. In June 2016, Brad Fuller said the remake was in development hell. Englund expressed interest in returning to the series in a cameo role. He later expressed interest in having Kevin Bacon portray Freddy.

In October 2018, Robert Englund reprised his role as Freddy Krueger on a Halloween-themed episode of The Goldbergs. In December, Johnson said the remake of A Nightmare on Elm Street was still in development, but New Line Cinema was more focused on The Conjuring Universe:

"It's still happening. Nothing is percolating just yet. The Conjuring universe is sort of first and foremost on [New Line Cinema's] horror burner. Everybody wants to see Freddy again I think, so I think it's inevitable at some point".

In September 2019, it was announced that film rights had reverted to Wes Craven's estate. By November, the estate had begun work on future project pitches for new A Nightmare on Elm Street projects, with pitches received for both feature film and a potential HBO Max series, with the intent to have Robert Englund reprise his role as Freddy Krueger.

In 2022 and 2024, Heather Langenkamp expressed interest in reprising the role of Nancy Thompson in a potential legacy sequel directly following A Nightmare on Elm Street. In 2025, Robert Englund also expressed interest in reprising the role of Freddy Krueger in animated form.

In July 2026, it was announced that Paramount Pictures had acquired U.S. rights to the original screenplay for the first film from Wes Craven's estate, with plans to adapt it into a reboot that will serve as the first film for its genre label, Paramount Primal. Meanwhile, Warner Bros. Pictures and New Line Cinema retained international rights to the franchise. The same month, it was reported that Warner Bros. was developing a separate film, with Lee Cronin in talks to write and direct, to compete with Paramount, with each studio attempting to advance into their projects before the proposed merger finalized. After Paramount Skydance Corporation merged with Warner Bros. Discovery to form Skydance Corporation on October 6, 2026, Skydance Motion Picture Group became the worldwide rights holder for the entire franchise. In November 2026, it was announced that Paramount's film would be moving forward.

== Television ==
Beginning on October 8, 1988, Freddy's Nightmares was an anthology series, in the vein of The Twilight Zone, which featured different horror stories each week. The show was hosted by Freddy Krueger, with Robert Englund reprising his role from the films. Freddy played more of a background character, but occasionally showed up to influence the plot of particular episodes. The series ran for two seasons and a total of 44 episodes, ending March 12, 1990. Although most of the episodes did not feature Freddy taking a major role in the plot, the pilot episode "No More Mr. Nice Guy" depicts the events of Krueger's trial, and his subsequent death at the hands of the parents of Elm Street after his acquittal. Directed by Tobe Hooper, creator of The Texas Chainsaw Massacre franchise, Freddy's acquittal is based on the arresting officer, Lt. Tim Blocker, not reading him his Miranda rights, which is different from the original Nightmare that stated he was acquitted because someone forgot to sign a search warrant. After the town's parents burn Freddy to death he returns to haunt Blocker in his dreams. Freddy gets his revenge when Blocker is put to sleep at the dentist's office, and Freddy shows up and kills him.

== In other media ==
=== Literature ===
==== Novels ====
Between 1987 and 2003, Freddy Krueger appeared in the novelization of each of the films. The first five films were adapted by St. Martin's Press. Those adaptations follow the films closely, with minor changes to specific details that occurred in the film. A Nightmare on Elm Street 3 does not follow the respective film, instead utilizing the same plot elements to tell a different story altogether. This novel also provides a different backstory for Freddy. In 1992, Abdo & Daughters Publishing Company released adaptations of their own for the first six films. Written by Bob Italia, each was under one hundred pages and followed the films' plot. The final two books, Wes Craven's New Nightmare and Freddy vs. Jason, were published by Tor Books and Black Flame. These novels also followed the films closely, with the adaptation of Freddy vs. Jason containing a different ending than the movie.

==== Comic books ====
The popularity of the film series also led to the creation of several comic book series published by companies such as Marvel Comics, Innovation Comics, Trident Comics, Avatar Press and, most recently, WildStorm Comics. Writers such as Steve Gerber, Andy Mangels, Chuck Dixon and Brian Pulido have all contributed stories to the various series. There have been crossovers with other franchises, such as Freddy vs. Jason vs. Ash: The Nightmare Warriors.

=== Documentary ===
On May 4, 2010, a 4-hour documentary chronicling the Nightmare on Elm Street series was released. The documentary includes interviews with the cast and crew for all of the Nightmare films. In a wish to utilize individuals who contributed to the series, the makers of the documentary procured poster artist Matthew Joseph Peak to create the artwork for the release poster and DVD cover, and composer Charles Bernstein for the film's main title music. As part of a special offering, the filmmakers gave away a limited edition poster to anyone that ordered the documentary from the official website. Those same individuals would also be entered into a drawing to win one of three 27" × 40" teaser posters signed by dozens of people who worked on the films and were interviewed in the documentary. Michael Gingold of Fangoria felt the filmmakers did an amazing job bringing together all of the behind-the-scenes footage, picture, never-before-seen deleted scenes, FX scenes, and other "treasures". Gingold noted that even die-hard fans would find something new. Bloody Disgusting's Ryan Daley praised the film for being educational, and looking at the legacy of both A Nightmare on Elm Street and New Line Cinema. Daley believed that there was no better horror documentary. Nick Hyman of Under the Radar noted that Never Sleep Again, unlike the earlier His Name Was Jason documentary, provided a more candid interview process with the people involved. Hyman pointed out that the best part of the documentary is the look at New Line's success through the Elm Street films, and the financial struggles and deadlines that plagued the film series.

Aside from the Never Sleep Again: The Elm Street Legacy documentary, some smaller documentaries have been made; The Making of 'Nightmare on Elm Street IV' (1989) and The Making of Freddy's Dead: The Final Nightmare (1991) covered the making of part 4 and 6 respectively. MTV released another short promotional special Slash & Burn: The Freddy Krueger Story in 1991. Robert Englund also narrated the documentary Freddy Speaks in 1992, both as himself and as Freddy Krueger. Heather Langenkamp released her own documentary called I Am Nancy in 2011, while Mark Patton also released a personal documentary, Scream, Queen! My Nightmare on Elm Street in 2019.

=== Merchandise ===
In February 2010, Funko released a Freddy Bobblehead. Also in 2010, NECA released a 10" puppet of Freddy Krueger from Phillip's death scene in A Nightmare on Elm Street 3: Dream Warriors, a metal replica of his glove, and two action figures: Freddy before he was burned, and the other being him after the burning, including two interchangeable heads.

=== Video games ===
A Nightmare on Elm Street is the shared name of two unrelated video games released in 1989, both loosely based on the series. From among those films, Dream Warriors and The Dream Master were particular influences on the gameplay of each. LJN (programmed by Rare) released one title for the NES, and Monarch Software the other for the Commodore 64 and IBM PC compatibles.

- A Nightmare on Elm Street: A Nintendo Entertainment System videogame released in 1989. Up to four players control characters who jump and punch their way through Elm Street locations as they collect the bones of Freddy Krueger to place them in a furnace and end his reign of terror. Each character can withstand only four hits from opponents before losing a life. An on-screen meter slowly diminishes (more quickly when sustaining damage), representing how close a particular character is to falling asleep. Obtaining cups of coffee within the game restores characters' sleep bar. When any character's sleep bar empties, all the players are transported to the dream world, where enemies take on new appearances and are more difficult to defeat. In the dream world, coffee cups are replaced with radios, which return the characters to the normal world and difficulty. Dream Warrior icons appear that once collected by any player, permit transformation into one of three "Dream Warriors". Each warrior has a projectile attack and improved movement: ninja (throwing stars, jump kick), acrobat (javelins, somersault), and magician (fireballs, hovering). These icons appear only in the normal world, and can be used only in the dream. If a character remains asleep too long, the film's theme song plays and a combative encounter with Freddy ensues. Upon collecting all the bones in a level, the player is automatically put in the dream world and battles Freddy, who takes on a special form similar to those presented in the films. The final level is set at Elm Street High School as players navigate to the boiler room to burn Freddy's bones. Here one final battle with Freddy Krueger occurs. The game can utilize the NES Four Score or NES Satellite accessories to enable four-player gameplay.
- A Nightmare on Elm Street: A game produced by Monarch Software for C64/IBM-PC gaming. Developed by Westwood Associates, its role-playing elements and overhead viewpoint bear some similarity to Gauntlet. The player chooses to play as either Kincaid, Kristen Parker, Will, Nancy, or Taryn on a quest to save Joey and defeat Freddy. The player must locate keys to open doors. Weapons and items are scattered about the levels or can be purchased from vending machines. Enemies are varied, from skeletons to wheelchairs. Freddy assumes the role of "boss monster" and transforms into a snake, much like his appearance in A Nightmare on Elm Street 3: Dream Warriors.
- A Nightmare on Elm Street content has been featured in video games such as Mortal Kombat (2011), Mortal Kombat Mobile, Dead by Daylight, and Fortnite.

David Bergantino, video game developer, wanted to produce a Freddy vs. Jason game called Freddy vs. Jason: Hell Unbound, but the film being stuck in development hell constantly delayed any release of a video game, and once a release date had been set for the film, there would have been insufficient time to develop the game to correspond with the film's release date. The game would have continued on from Jason Goes to Hell: The Final Friday (1993) and have been its own storyline instead of being based on any screenplay. Bergantino considered Dreamcast, PlayStation 2 and later Xbox as possible platforms for the video game. The game would have allowed up to four players with Freddy or Jason as player characters, in various forms such as "Hooded Jason" or "Snake-Freddy". The premise would have been that Freddy and Jason are permanently stuck in Hell due to their countless unforgivable sins; Death makes the offer that whoever of the two can fight their way out of Hell, against demons and others of its denizens, gaining the highest body-count, would have been allowed to leave Hell, while the loser will remain stuck there forever. As each of the slashers are stuck in their personal hells, versions of Elm Street and Camp Crystal Lake would have existed there in some form. Freddy-based levels would have been more surreal, while Freddy could have toyed with Jason's perceptions.
