= List of Friday the 13th characters =

Friday the 13th is an American horror franchise that consists of twelve slasher films, two television shows, novels, and comic books. The main villain in the series is Jason Voorhees, who drowned at Camp Crystal Lake as a boy due to the negligence of the teenage counselors. Decades later, the lake is rumored to be "cursed" and is the setting for a series of mass murders. Jason is featured in all of the films, either as the killer or as the motivation for the killings. Each entry in the series features a different cast of characters, including a final girl who defeats the killer in the end. Recurring characters in the series include Jason's vengeful mother Pamela Voorhees, Alice Hardy, Tommy Jarvis and Crazy Ralph.

== Overview ==
Characters	Films												Television series
Characters	Original series										Crossover	Reboot	Television series
Characters	Friday the 13th	Friday the 13th Part 2	Friday the 13th Part III	Friday the 13th: The Final Chapter	Friday the 13th: A New Beginning	Friday the 13th Part VI: Jason Lives	Friday the 13th Part VII: The New Blood	Friday the 13th Part VIII: Jason Takes Manhattan	Jason Goes to Hell: The Final Friday	Jason X	Freddy vs. Jason	Friday the 13th	Crystal Lake
Characters	1980	1981	1982	1984	1985	1986	1988	1989	1993	2001	2003	2009	2026
Jason Voorhees	Ari Lehman	Steve Daskewisz (masked) Warrington Gillette (unmasked)	Richard Brooker	Ted White	Tom Morga (Hallucinations) John Hock (Opening dream sequence)	C. J. Graham	Kane Hodder	Kane Hodder Timothy Burr Mirkovich^{Y}	Kane Hodder	Kane Hodder	Ken Kirzinger Spencer Stump^{Y}	Derek Mears Caleb Guss^{Y}	Jonathan Tison Callum Vinson ^{Y} Kaiden Cullen^{Y} Theo Lonsdale^{Y}
Pamela "Pam" Vorhees	Betsy Palmer	Betsy Palmer	Marilyn Poucher								Paula Shaw	Nana Visitor	Linda Cardellini
Alice Hardy	Adrienne King	Adrienne King		Flashback		Mentioned						Stephanie Rhodes	
Crazy Ralph	Walt Gorney	Walt Gorney		Walt Gorney^{A}									Nick Cordileone
Freddy Krueger									Hand		Robert Englund		
Bill Brown	Harry Crosby III												
Marcie Stanler	Jeannine Taylor												
Brenda Jones	Laurie Bartram												
Jack Burrell	Kevin Bacon												
Ned Rubenstein	Mark Nelson												
Annie Phillips	Robbi Morgan												
Dorf	Ron Millkie												Cameron Scoggins
Enos	Rex Everhart												Daniel Stewart Sherman
Trudy	Dorothy Kobs												Bernadette Quigley
Steve Christy	Peter Brouwer												Dan Thompson
Barry	Willie Adams												Phoenix Parnevik
Claudette	Debra S. Hayes												Danielle Kotch
Virginia "Ginny" Field		Amy Steel	Amy Steel^{A}	Amy Steel^{A}									
Sandra Dier		Marta Kober		Marta Kober^{A}			Marta Kober^{A}						
Terry McCarthy		Kristen Baker	Flashback	Kristen Baker^{A}									
Paul Holt		John Furey											
Ted Bowen		Stuart Charno											
Vickie Perry		Lauren-Marie Taylor											
Mark Jarvis		Tom McBride											
Jeff Dunsberry		Bill Randolph											
Scott Cheney		Russell Todd											
Christine "Chris" Higgins			Dana Kimmell	Flashback									
Rick Bombay			Paul Kratka										
Debbie Klein			Tracie Savage										
Andy Beltrami			Jeffrey Rogers										
Vera Sanchez			Catherine Parks										
Shelly Finkelstein			Larry Zerner										
Chuck Garth			David Katims										
Chili Jachson			Rachel Howard										
Thomas "Tommy" Jarvis				Corey Feldman	John Shepherd Corey Feldman^{Y}^{C}	Thom Mathews							
Patricia "Trish" Jarvis				Kimberly Beck	Kimberly Beck^{A}^{P}								
Tracy Jarvis				Joan Freeman	Joan Freeman^{P}								
Rob Dier				E. Erich Anderson									
Sara Parkington				Barbara Howard									
Doug Bell				Peter Barton									
Jimmy Mortimer				Crispin Glover									
Ted Cooper				Lawrence Monoson									
Samantha Lane				Judie Aronson									
Paul Guthrie				Alan Hayes									
Tina Moore				Camilla More									
Terri Moore				Carey More									
Pam Roberts					Melanie Kinnaman	Mentioned							
Reggie Winter					Shavar Ross								
Dr. Matthew Letter					Richard Young								
Roy Burns					Dick Wieand (Unmasked) Tom Morga(Masked)								
Violet Moraine					Tiffany Helm								
Robin Brown					Juliette Cummins								
Joey Burns					Dominick Brascia								
Vic Faden					Mark Venturini								
Jake Patterson					Jerry Pavlon								
Eddie Kelso					John Robert Dixon								
Tina McCarthy					Debi Sue Voorhees								
Ethel Hubbard					Carol Locatell								
Junior Hubbard					Ron Sloan								
Megan Garris						Jennifer Cooke							
Sheriff Mike Garris						David Kagen							
Paula Mott						Kerry Noonan							
Sissy Baker						Renée Jones							
Cort Andrews						Tom Fridley							
Nikki Parsley						Darcy DeMoss							
Lizbeth Mott						Nancy McLoughlin							
Darren Robinson						Tony Goldwyn							
Allen Hawes						Ron Palillo							
Tina Shepard							Lar Park Lincoln Jennifer Banko^{Y}						
Nick Rogers							Kevin Blair						
Melissa Paur							Susan Jennifer Sullivan						
Amanda Shepard							Susan Blu						
Dr. Crews							Terry Kiser						
Michael Rogers							William Butler						
David Peabody							Jon Renfield						
Robin Peterson							Elizabeth Kaitan						
Maddy Paulson							Diana Barrows						
Eddie McCarlo							Jeff Bennett						
Russell Bowen							Larry Cox						
Ben MacNeal							Craig Thomas						
Kate Pataki							Diane Almeida						
Rennie Wickham								Jensen Daggett Amber Pawlick^{Y}					
Sean Robertson								Scott Reeves					
Colleen Van Deusen								Barbara Bingham					
Charles McCulloch								Peter Mark Richman					
Julius Gaw								V. C. Dupree					
Eva Watanabe								Kelly Hu					
Tamara Mason								Sharlene Martin					
Miles Wolfe								Gordon Currie					
J.J. Jarrett								Saffron Henderson					
Wayne Webber								Martin Cummins					
Steven Freeman									John D. LeMay				
Jessica Kimble									Kari Keegan				
Creighton Duke									Steven Williams				
Vicki Sanders									Allison Smith				
Diana Kimble									Erin Gray				
Robert Campbell									Steven Culp				
Joey B.									Rusty Schwimmer				
Shelby B.									Leslie Jordan				
Sheriff Ed Landis									Billy "Green" Bush				
Deputy Josh									Andrew Bloch				
Randy Parker									Kipp Marcus				
Phil									Richard Gant				
Rowan LaFontaine										Lexa Doig			
KM-14										Lisa Ryder			
Tsunaron Peyton										Chuck Campbell			
Janessa Zachary										Melyssa Ade			
Azrael Benrubi										Dov Tiefenbach			
Professor Braithwaite Lowe										Jonathan Potts			
Kinsa Cooper										Melody Johnson			
Waylander										Derwin Jordan			
Stoney Zachary										Yani Gellman			
Adrienne Hart										Kristi Angus			
Sergeant Elijah Brodski										Peter Mensah			
Trevor "Crutch" Crutchfield										Philip Williams			
Lori Campbell											Monica Keena		
Will Rollins											Jason Ritter		
Kia Waterson											Kelly Rowland		
Mark Davis											Brendan Fletcher		
Charlie Linderman											Chris Marquette		
Deputy Scott Stubbs											Lochlyn Munro		
Gibb Smith											Katharine Isabelle		
Bill Freeburg											Kyle Labine		
Trey Cooper											Jesse Hutch		
Clay Miller												Jared Padalecki	
Whitney Miller												Amanda Righetti	
Jenna												Danielle Panabaker	
Trent												Travis Van Winkle	
Bree												Julianna Guill	
Chewie												Aaron Yoo	
Chelsea												Willa Ford	
Nolan												Ryan Hansen	
Lawrence												Arlen Escarpeta	
Levon "Lee" Brooks													William Catlett
Grace Snell													Gwendolyn Sundstrom
Briana Brooks													Devin Kessler
Rita													Joy Suprano
John Christy	Mentioned												Brian J. Carter
Kay Christy	Mentioned												Nancy Nagrant
Elias Wittering						Mentioned			Mentioned				Hamish Linklater

== A ==
=== Abel ===
- Portrayed by David Wiley
- Appears in: Friday the 13th Part III
- Status: Alive

Abel is an elderly gentleman who picks up where Crazy Ralph left off by warning teenagers who venture into the area of Camp Crystal Lake. He is met briefly as Chris Higgins nearly runs him over with her van as he is lying in the middle of the road. After thanking the teens for their compassion and kindness, Abel claims that "he" (Jason) had given him a token to warn off any who venture into the area. He reveals the gift as a disembodied eyeball, which suddenly frightens the teens who drive off and leave him behind as he continues to proclaim his warning. He is never seen again.

=== Admiral Robertson ===
- Portrayed by Warren Munson
- Appears in: Friday the 13th Part VIII: Jason Takes Manhattan
- Status: Deceased
- Died in: Friday the 13th Part VIII: Jason Takes Manhattan

Admiral Robertson was the captain of the SS Lazarus cruise ship that a group of graduating senior students from Lakeview High School had boarded to visit New York City. He is the father of Sean Robertson, while in the ship's cabin he and Sean argue over the procedure of how to correctly set sail. During a violent storm Admiral Robertson briefly leaves the wheel, while he is gone Jason kills his first mate. Admiral Robertson returns to the cabin to find the first mate's dead body, Jason then appears from behind and slits his throat with a machete. Admiral Robertson's body is later found by Sean and Rennie.

=== Alexis Peterson ===
- Portrayed by Kathryn Atwood
- Appears in: Jason Goes to Hell: The Final Friday
- Status: Deceased
- Died in: Jason Goes to Hell: The Final Friday

Alexis Peterson, Deborah, and Deborah's boyfriend Luke, hitchhiked to Crystal Lake to celebrate Jason's death. When Steven gave them a ride, Alexis flirted with Steven, unsuccessfully trying to persuade him to come with them. After skinny dipping, Alexis slept outside while Luke and Deborah had sex in her tent. While peeing, a Jason-possessed Phil slashed Alexis to death with a scalpel, and propped her corpse on a tree.

=== Ali ===
- Portrayed by Nick Savage
- Appears in: Friday the 13th Part III, Friday the 13th: The Final Chapter
- Status: Deceased
- Died in: Friday the 13th Part III

Ali is the leader of a biker gang, consisting of himself, Fox, and Loco. After a tense confrontation with Shelly and Vera at a convenience store, Shelly destroys the gang's bikes in front of Ali. In retaliation, the gang sneaks into Higgins Haven and drains the gas from Chris's van. When Fox and Loco wander into the barn, Ali goes to check on them where he discovers their corpses. Jason then beats Ali unconscious with a pipe wrench. Ali later awakens when Chris is about to be killed by Jason and attacks him. Jason severs Ali's hand and slices him to pieces with his machete, allowing Chris to put Jason down with an axe to the head moments later.

An alternate ending saw Ali and Chris survive and contact the authorities only for Jason's body to be missing when they arrive.

=== Alice Hardy ===
- Portrayed by Adrienne King (1980 - Part 2) and Stephanie Rhodes (2009)
- Appears in: Friday the 13th (1980), Friday the 13th Part 2, Friday the 13th (2009)
- Status: Alive (reboot timeline) / Deceased (original timeline)
- Died in: Friday the 13th Part 2

Alice Hardy is one of the camp counselors hired by Steve Christy to reopen and work at Camp Crystal Lake. In the film, the counselors are murdered until she is eventually left alone as the only survivor, and is discovered by Pamela Voorhees. Mrs. Voorhees explains to Alice how her son Jason drowned at the camp several years ago, and reveals herself to be the killer. After a long chase and a brief struggle, Alice is finally able to decapitate Mrs. Voorhees with a machete before passing out in a canoe on the lake. There, she suffers a nightmare in which Jason's decayed corpse drags her underwater. The police arrive and take Alice to the hospital. When she tells them her story, they explain that they did not find a boy, to which she replies "Then he's still there..." Alice makes a brief reappearance in the opening scene of Friday the 13th Part 2, where she is stabbed in the temple with an ice pick in her apartment by an adult Jason Voorhees, who evidently survived his childhood drowning and had tracked her down. Later in the movie, Paul explains how Alice went missing and blood was found in her apartment. Her decomposed body is later seen in Jason's shack. Alice also appears in a flashback in Friday the 13th: The Final Chapter.

Although always the heroine, Alice was originally scripted as a slightly less sympathetic character than seen in the final cut of the first film. In early drafts, she was having an affair with a married man on the West Coast, which was the reason her relationship with Steve Christy is deteriorating and she wants to leave Crystal Lake. Adrienne King claims she played the character as a traditional horror movie character, stating "I think that Alice is a great scream queen heroine. You got the feeling that Alice could handle anything which, in a way, she could". She also expresses regret that, due to the nature of horror movies, audiences never got to see more of Alice's relationship with Steve, or what could have happened between her and fellow counsellor, Bill. Rather than viewing the character as a victim, King describes the role as an "empowering position" due to her survival in the film. Steve Miner, director of Part 2, says "Alice was a very special character: she was the hero of the first film and indestructible in a way. It was important that she be killed off in a dramatic way because this is Jason's film and avenging the death of his mother is what motivates him." Because the character displayed an artistic side in the first film, production designer Virginia Field included various sketches in her apartment to show that Alice was a "real person". She says, "It didn't seem like a big deal at the time we were filming, but I knew that Alice liked to draw and I wanted to show evidence of that." Adrienne King felt that killing her character was somewhat unusual since she had survived so much in the original film. She claims Alice's death was done in such a way to leave the door open for a possible return, but does not know how she could have survived an icepick through the head.

Alice's decayed corpse appears as a part of the model of Jason's shrine to his mother NECA has released. Mezco Toyz has also released a screen grab statuette of Alice, which depicts the hallucination of Jason attacking her from the ending of Friday the 13th. Alice Hardy was Jason Voorhees's first murder victim, yet he murdered her in her house, not at the Crystal Lake Campground.

=== Andy ===
- Portrayed by Jeffrey Rogers
- Appears in: Friday the 13th Part III, Friday the 13th: The Final Chapter
- Status: Deceased
- Died in: Friday the 13th Part III

Andy is the boyfriend of Debbie and is also a friend of Chris Higgins, as well as Chuck, Chili, Vera, and Shelly. At Higgins Haven Andy gets into a juggling challenge with Shelly, and Debbie walks up to him, saying there are better things he could be doing with his hands. Andy forfeits and leaves Shelly to his juggling while he and Debbie go upstairs. Later, after Chris and Rick go out for the night, Andy and Debbie finish having sex. Debbie then gets up to take a shower. Andy handstands his way into the bathroom, asking if she wants a beer, to which she accepts. Andy is killed when Jason slices him in half at the groin with his machete. His halves are then wedged in the rafters of Chris's room seen by Debbie moments before she is killed.

=== Annette ===
- Portrayed by Cynthia Kania
- Appears in: Friday the 13th Part VI: Jason Lives
- Status: Deceased
- Died in: Friday the 13th Part VI: Jason Lives

Annette and her boyfriend Steven are having a picnic in the woods when they hear a scream. Steven goes to check out the noise and sees Jason killing the local gravedigger Martin. A panicked Steven runs back to Annette who asks him what is wrong, she and Steven board his motorbike but Jason approaches and impales both Steven and her with his machete.

=== Annie Phillips ===
- Portrayed by Robbi Morgan
- Appears in: Friday the 13th (1980), Friday the 13th Part 2
- Status: Deceased
- Died in: Friday the 13th (1980)

Annie Phillips is a young teenage girl who hitchhikes her way to Camp Crystal Lake after being hired to work as the camp cook. Arriving in the area, she stops in a diner and one of the locals, Enos, agrees to drive her part of the way to the camp. En route, Enos informs Annie about the camp's notorious history, telling her about the two counselors, Barry and Claudette, who were murdered in 1958, as well as mysterious fires and water contamination that occurred after the deaths of the two counselors. Annie dismisses the warnings, stating that she can't just quit her job. After Enos drops her off, Annie is picked up by someone else, whose identity is not revealed. During this second car ride, Annie tells the driver that she really likes children when she suddenly notices that they have driven past the camp. Annie, panicked, opens the passenger door and jumps out of the car. However, the unknown driver stops alongside the road and pursues Annie into the woods. After a brief chase, the unknown driver of the car finds Annie and slits her throat. Her corpse is later discovered by Alice Hardy inside the car of Pamela Voorhees.

=== Allen Hawes ===
- Portrayed by Ron Palillo
- Appears in: Friday the 13th Part VI: Jason Lives, Friday the 13th Part VII: The New Blood
- Status: Deceased
- Died in: Friday the 13th Part VI: Jason Lives

Allen Hawes is a friend of Tommy Jarvis. Hawes was a friend of Tommy who was going to help him on his mission to cremate Jason Voorhees’ body. When Jason comes back from the dead and touches Tommy’s foot, Allen runs, but soon after, he comes back hitting Jason in the head. Jason in turn punches his heart out.

=== Axel Burns ===
- Portrayed by Bruce Mahler
- Appears in: Friday the 13th: The Final Chapter
- Status: Deceased
- Died in: Friday the 13th: The Final Chapter

Axel Burns was a coroner. Axel scares his girlfriend, a nurse named Robbie Morgan, but he apologises for it and they end up almost having sex until Robbie is scared by Jason's hand dropping from the gurney and leaves. Axel, disappointed, starts watching aerobics and drinking coffee. Jason promptly slits Axel's throat with a hacksaw, before twisting his head around.

== B ==
=== Barry ===
- Portrayed by Willie Adams (1980) and Phoenix Parnevik (2026)
- Appears in: Friday the 13th (1980) and Crystal Lake (2026)
- Status: Deceased
- Died in: Friday the 13th (1980) and Crystal Lake (episode: "The New Blood")

Barry was a counselor at Camp Crystal Lake during the summer of 1958 and was the boyfriend of Claudette, a fellow counselor. After singing with the other counselors around a campfire, he and his girlfriend snuck away and secretly entered a cabin used for storage to have sex. Unbeknownst to the young couple, Pamela Voorhees was lurking and watching them. Eventually, she revealed herself to the teens, whereupon Barry attempted to convince her that they were just horsing around, but Mrs. Voorhees stabbed him in the abdomen, killing him.

Several years later, he is mentioned along with Claudette by Enos, the truck driver, when a young girl named Annie Phillips hitches a ride halfway to Camp Crystal Lake. Little information is given about this character, but he is notable for being the first murder victim of the entire series.

In the television series Crystal Lake, unlike the 1980 film, the series takes place in 1972. The fifth episode "The New Blood", he and Claudette both have sex in a cabin and later killed by Grace Snell (after being drugged with LSD). The sixth episode "Kill Them, Mommy", Barry and Claudette's bodies carried away by Pamela Voorhees to the forest as she starts to kill Harmony and her group.

=== Ben ===
- Portrayed by Craig Thomas
- Appears in: Friday the 13th Part VII: The New Blood
- Status: Deceased
- Died in: Friday the 13th Part VII: The New Blood

Ben and his girlfriend Kate are attending a birthday party with a group of friends. The pair head to Ben's van to have sex but hear noises outside. When Ben goes to investigate, he is grabbed by Jason who crushes his skull to a pulp.

=== Bree ===
- Portrayed by Julianna Guill
- Appears in: Friday the 13th (2009)
- Status: Deceased
- Died in: Friday the 13th (2009)

Bree is Chelsea's best friend. Bree spends most of the movie partying, drinking, and making videos on her camcorder. By the evening, with Jenna nowhere in sight, she then ceases the opportunity to seduce and take Trent to the master bedroom. After they finish, they come downstairs and witness Jason killing Lawrence, leaving Bree horrified. She follows Trent upstairs when he goes looking for a gun, then wanders into the bathroom after seeing an open window. She is ambushed by Jason, impaled on a rack of antlers and thrown out the window.

== C ==
=== Charles McCulloch ===
- Portrayed by Peter Mark Richman
- Appears in: Friday the 13th Part VIII: Jason Takes Manhattan
- Status: Deceased
- Died in: Friday the 13th Part VIII: Jason Takes Manhattan

Charles McCulloch is a biology teacher at Lakeview High School. He is also a chaperone aboard the SS Lazarus; a ship bound for New York City for a senior class trip. Much to his chagrin, his coworker Colleen Van Deusen brings his niece Rennie Wickham along, who has a strong fear of water. He ignores a deckhand's warning that Jason Voorhees is on board killing his students, stating that "Walking corpses don't exist" and he thinks the deckhand is responsible for the murders, until he discovers him dead from an axe to his back. McCulloch, along with Van Deusen, Rennie, Sean Robertson, Julius Gaw and Rennie's dog Toby escape the Lazarus and find their way to New York. Later, Rennie steals a police car after the officer is killed. She hallucinates, seeing a young Jason. She drives the car at the vision but the car crashes, killing Colleen. Rennie then remembers that McCulloch was responsible for her fear of the water, by forcing her into Camp Crystal Lake to learn how to swim. Disgusted, Rennie and Sean leave him behind before Jason appears. McCulloch tries to run but he is thrown from a window like a rag doll. Jason then stuffs McCulloch into a toxic filled barrel and drowns him.

=== Chelsea ===
- Portrayed by Willa Ford
- Appears in: Friday the 13th (2009)
- Status: Deceased
- Died in: Friday the 13th (2009)

Chelsea joins her friends for a fun filled weekend at Trent's summer home on Crystal Lake. After passing the time playing games and drinking, she and Nolan Hamilton go down to the lake to do some wakeboarding. As Nolan drives the boat, Chelsea loses her balance and falls into the lake. As Nolan turns the boat around, he is shot in the head with an arrow, causing his body to fall onto the throttle, increasing the boat's speed. Chelsea watches as the boat comes towards her, realizing too late as the boat runs over her, suffering a head injury. As she comes to, her eyes find Jason standing on the banks of the lake, watching her. A terrified Chelsea gets under the dock at the shoreline, but Jason appears and walks out onto the dock. Jason is shown walking off the dock and out of Chelsea's sight. As she starts to relax, a machete bursts through the top of Chelsea's head, killing her.

=== Chewie ===
- Portrayed by Aaron Yoo
- Appears in: Friday the 13th (2009)
- Status: Deceased
- Died in: Friday the 13th (2009)

Chewie joins his friends for a fun filled weekend at Trent's summer home on Crystal Lake. Chewie passes the time getting stoned and playing games. After breaking a chair, he is directed to the tool shed by Trent to get some tools. In the shed, he bumps into Jason, who stabs him under the chin with a screwdriver. Driving the screwdriver deeper into his skull, Jason hangs Chewie's body from the ceiling after killing him.

=== Chili ===
- Portrayed by Rachel Howard
- Appears in: Friday the 13th Part III, Friday the 13th: The Final Chapter
- Status: Deceased
- Died in: Friday the 13th Part III

Chili and her boyfriend Chuck are hippy stoners. On the way to Higgins Haven, the police begin following Chris Higgins's van when Chuck and Chili are smoking marijuana in the back. They get their friends to eat the "evidence", but are annoyed when the police pass them. Later that evening, Chuck and Chili are making popcorn when the power goes out. Chili finds Shelly on the doorstep with his throat slit. She thinks it's another prank but soon realizes he's actually dead. As Chili runs through the house, Jason stabs her through the stomach with a hot fire poker. He carries her body away.

Chili's bloody sweater is later found by Chris in the bathtub.

=== Chris Higgins ===
- Portrayed by Dana Kimmell
- Appears in: Friday the 13th Part III, Friday the 13th: The Final Chapter
- Status: Alive

Christine "Chris" Higgins is a teenage girl who lives in the Crystal Lake area. She returns to her home three years after a traumatic experience. It is later revealed through flashback that Chris survived an attack by a disfigured man who turns out to be Jason Voorhees. Jason, who is still living in the forest, attacks her again at her summer home and murders her friends. Chris manages to hit Jason in the head with an axe, before suffering a hallucination of Jason's mother dragging her into the lake, similar to the ending of the first Friday the 13th. She is then taken away by the police, severely traumatized.

In the opening sequence of Friday the 13th: The Final Chapter (which takes place the day after Part III), a mother is seen consoling her daughter in a hospital waiting room. Since the daughter is only seen from behind, the probable implication is that she is Chris.

In an alternate ending of Friday the 13th Part III, Chris's fate is changed; after hearing her boyfriend Rick's voice while canoeing to safety, Chris follows it to a cabin, only to be decapitated by an unmasked Jason, who is waiting inside.

Dana Kimmell has said that she only took the role of Chris due to the paycheck, stating she felt uncomfortable working on the movie, persuading executive producer Frank Mancuso to alter or remove several scenes involving gratuitous sexual or violent material. Her reason for taking the role is similar to that of Ted White taking the role of Jason in Friday the 13th: The Final Chapter.

=== Chuck ===
- Portrayed by David Katims
- Appears in: Friday the 13th Part III, Friday the 13th: The Final Chapter
- Status: Deceased
- Died in: Friday the 13th Part III

Chuck and his girlfriend Chili are hippy stoners, always high when given the chance. On the way to Higgins Haven Chuck, Chili, Andy, Shelly and Vera are forced to eat Chuck's marijuana as the police are behind them. Chuck is unhappy when he realizes the police weren't following them. Chuck and Chili make popcorn that night and Chuck goes outside when the power goes out. As he checks the fuse box, Jason appears behind him and throws him into the fuse box electrocuting him to death.

=== Claudette ===
- Portrayed by Debra S. Hayes (1980) and Danielle Kotch (2026)
- Appears in: Friday the 13th (1980) and Crystal Lake (2026)
- Status: Deceased
- Died in: Friday the 13th (1980) and Crystal Lake (episode: "The New Blood")

Claudette was a counselor working at Camp Crystal Lake during the summer of 1958 and was Barry's girlfriend. After having sung a camp fire song with the other counselors, she snuck away with her boyfriend to have sex privately in a cabin that was used for storage. Unbeknownst to them at the time, Pamela Voorhees was lurking and watching. She eventually interrupted the two teens and killed Barry first. Claudette was left alone, screaming and pleading for her life. Despite attempts to defend herself with a few items and run away from her assailant, she was ultimately cornered and killed off-screen by Pamela.

In the television series Crystal Lake, unlike the 1980 film, the series takes place in 1972. The fifth episode "The New Blood", she and Barry both have sex in a cabin and later killed by Grace Snell (after being drugged with LSD). Pamela arrives and stabs Claudette dead. The sixth episode "Kill Them, Mommy", Claudette and Barry's bodies are carried away by Pamela to the forest as Pamela starts to kill Harmony and her group.

=== Clay Miller ===
- Portrayed by Jared Padalecki
- Appears in: Friday the 13th (2009)
- Status: Unknown

Clay Miller comes to Crystal Lake searching for his missing sister, Whitney, who is attacked by Jason Voorhees early in the movie. The Crystal Lake locals have given up searching for Whitney, who has not been seen for six weeks, and advise Clay to look for her somewhere else. Undeterred, Clay eventually meets a group of college students vacationing in the woods, and befriends one of them, a girl named Jenna. Jenna decides to aid Clay in his investigation of Camp Crystal Lake, but while searching the camp grounds, they witness Jason Voorhees hauling a dead body. The pair escape to warn Jenna's friends, but Jason follows them and kills the other students. Clay and Jenna eventually wind up back at the camp, where they discover Whitney alive in Jason's underground lair. As the three make their way through the tunnels, Jason murders Jenna, leaving only Clay and his sister alive. The siblings take refuge in a barn, where Jason catches up with them. Whitney uses her resemblance to Jason's mother to distract the killer long enough to stab him with his own machete. She and Clay then dispose of his body in the lake, only to be attacked once more. His ultimate fate is left a mystery.

Jared Padalecki describes his character as a real hero, because when his sister goes missing he sets out "to do the right thing", and tends to go about it as this "lone wolf" who wants to take on this responsibility of finding his sister himself.

=== Ralph "Crazy Ralph" Neely ===
- Portrayed by Walt Gorney (1980–1981) and Nick Cordileone (2026)
- Appears in: Friday the 13th (1980), Friday the 13th Part 2, Crystal Lake (2026)
- Status: Alive (Crystal Lake) / Deceased (original timeline)
- Died in: Friday the 13th Part 2

"Crazy Ralph" is a man who lives in the Crystal Lake area, Ralph rides around on his bicycle telling people to stay away from Camp Crystal Lake (which he refers to as Camp Blood) or they will be killed, claiming he was a messenger sent by God to warn people of the campground's "death curse", always saying "Doomed. You're all doomed!" Ralph is murdered in Friday the 13th Part 2 by Jason Voorhees, who strangles him with a length of barbed wire and stuffs his body in a pantry, where Ginny Field discovers him. Crazy Ralph appears in archive footage in Friday the 13th: The Final Chapter.

Two other characters have had a Crazy Ralph-type role. In Friday the 13th Part III, the main characters encounter an old drifter named Abel while travelling to Higgins Haven. Abel carries around an eyeball which he views as an "omen" and warns the group to "Go back from whence ye came!" In Friday the 13th Part VIII: Jason Takes Manhattan, an unnamed deck hand of the Lazarus, having seen Jason climb aboard, attempts to warn the crew and passengers of the ship, but is dismissed as insane and later, when people aboard the ship are found dead, is accused of being the killer. The deck hand is later killed by Jason with a fire axe to the back.

Victor Miller claims that "the function of Crazy Ralph is to set the tone for this horrible geographic area." Miller also states that in the original screenplay for Friday the 13th, Ralph was known as "Ralphie the Rat Boy" and describes the character as "one of those crazies you see in Deliverance, a demented person who knows the truth, a character who gives you the sense that the world you're in is not what it seems, a soothsayer right out of Shakespeare. Most people think people like Ralphie are nuts, but they are closer to reality in some ways than the 'normies'."

Ralph is featured in the third installment of IGN's Obscure Character of the Day feature, which has him referred to as the "unsung hero of the slasher movie genre".

=== Creighton Duke ===
"Here's what happened. A teenage Creighton was out on Crystal Lake with his girlfriend, Jason capsized their small boat and pulled the girl down into the lake. Creighton tried to save her but could not. She was never seen again. Creighton vowed revenge and from that moment on he spent his life in the study and pursuit of Jason. He became a bounty hunter just to fund his work in taking down his nemesis. That's the story."

— Adam Marcus (2017) on his imagined backstory for Creighton Duke.
- Portrayed by Steven Williams
- Appears in: Jason Goes to Hell: The Final Friday
- Status: Deceased
- Died in Jason Goes to Hell: The Final Friday

Creighton Duke is an antiheroic bounty hunter who styles himself like a cowboy. He witnesses Jason Voorhees being blown apart by the FBI, but remains unconvinced that Jason is truly dead. After several murders are committed in a style similar to Jason's, Creighton is hired by talk show host Robert Campbell to hunt down and kill Jason. Before going to search for Jason, Creighton attempts to warn Jason's half-sister Diana that Jason will be searching for her, but is arrested by Diana's boyfriend, the sheriff, for harassing her. While in jail, Creighton meets Steven Freeman, the ex-boyfriend of Diana's daughter Jessica who has been blamed for Jason's murder of Diana. Creighton tells Steven that Jason will be looking for Jessica because; if he manages to possess her he can recreate his body. Creighton later escapes his jail cell when a Jason-possessed Robert Campbell goes on a rampage at the police station while looking for Jessica. Going to the diner where Diana worked, Creighton abducts Stephanie, Steven and Jessica's infant daughter, and brings her to Pamela Voorhees's old house, leaving a note for Steven and Jessica telling them to meet him there. When Jessica and Steven arrive, Creighton gives Jessica a dagger, which he claims can kill Jason if it is used against him by someone of Voorhees descent. When Jason (who has possessed a local deputy) arrives at the Voorhees house, he finds and possesses Diana's body, which had earlier been moved to the house by Robert Campbell. Attempting to fight the newly resurrected Jason, Creighton is incapacitated when Jason crushes his back in a bear hug.

Adam Marcus, the director of Jason Goes to Hell: The Final Friday, has imagined a backstory for Duke and claims that he survived his encounter with Jason off-screen after the film's conclusion and has hopes of creating a spin-off featuring the character. Marcus has said that he believes Creighton to be, after Jason, the best character in the Friday the 13th series, also stating Creighton "is the flip side of the Jason coin. A sadistic psychotic who happens to be sort of a hero or at least an enemy of Jason".

Creighton's original name was Anderson Duke. According to Marcus, Tony Todd was among those who auditioned for the role.

=== Colleen Van Deusen ===
- Portrayed by Barbara Bingham
- Appears in: Friday the 13th Part VIII: Jason Takes Manhattan
- Status: Deceased
- Died in: Friday the 13th Part VIII: Jason Takes Manhattan

Colleen Van Deusen is Rennie Wickham's teacher who accompanies her on the Lazarus for the students' graduation trip. She and Rennie are very close much to the chagrin of Charles McCulloch who disapproves of her bond with Rennie. When the group arrive in New York, Colleen is forced to watch as Rennie is kidnapped by two thugs. Colleen dies in an explosion when the police car Rennie commandeered and drove at Jason crashes and blows up, killing her instantly.

Colleen is the first Friday the 13th character to encounter Jason and not be killed by him, but still die.

=== Cort ===
- Portrayed by Tom Fridley
- Appears in: Friday the 13th Part VI: Jason Lives
- Status: Deceased
- Died in: Friday the 13th Part VI: Jason Lives

Cort is a scruffy, work-shy layabout who arrives with Megan, Paula and Sissy to teach the boys coming to the summer camp. He instantly gets on the wrong side of Sheriff Garris who disapproves of his dress sense and manners. Cort meets up with his girlfriend Nikki in her RV to have sex whilst listening to loud music, suddenly, the power goes off. Cort goes to investigate and finds the wire cut. Spooked, Cort decides to leave and starts driving the RV recklessly sending Nikki flying. She is pulled into the bathroom and killed by Jason via having her face forced into a mirror. Cort continues to drive while listening to Alice Cooper's "Teenage Frankenstein" on high volume; he spots Jason in the rear view mirror as Jason grabs his head and stabs him in the temple, killing him and causing the mobile home to crash.

== D ==
=== Debbie ===
- Portrayed by Tracy Savage
- Appears in: Friday the 13th Part III, Friday the 13th: The Final Chapter
- Status: Deceased
- Died in: Friday the 13th Part III

Debbie is Andy's pregnant girlfriend and a good friend of Chris Higgins. In the summer of 1984, she goes along with her friends to Higgins Haven with Andy's roommate Shelly and his blind date Vera Sanchez. At Higgins Haven, she watches Andy and Shelly have a juggling contest before walking over to Andy and telling him he can do better things with his hands. Later, she and Andy go upstairs to have sex. As she takes a shower, Andy walks in doing a handstand, asking her if she wants a beer. At first she says yes, but soon calls out to Andy to tell him she has changed her mind, but there is no answer. Debbie lays down on the hammock to read a Fangoria magazine and soon notices blood dripping down. She looks up and sees Andy's mutilated corpse wedged in the rafters above her. Before she can react, Jason, who had concealed himself beneath the hammock, grabs her head and stabs her through the neck, killing both Debbie and her unborn child.

=== Deborah ===
- Portrayed by Michelle Clunie
- Appears in: Jason Goes to Hell: The Final Friday
- Status: Deceased
- Died in: Jason Goes to Hell: The Final Friday

Deborah Caldwell, her boyfriend Luke, and Alexis hitchhiked to Crystal Lake to celebrate Jason's death, getting a ride from Steven. After skinny dipping, Deborah and Luke have sex in the tent. When Deborah reaches an orgasm, a Jason-possessed Phil impales her on a pole, and bisects her with it.

=== Diana Kimble ===
- Portrayed by Erin Gray
- Appears in: Jason Goes to Hell: The Final Friday
- Status: Deceased
- Died in: Jason Goes to Hell: The Final Friday

Diana Kimble is Jason's half-sister, mother of Jessica Kimble, and grandmother of Stephanie Kimble. She is targeted by Jason after his body is destroyed by the FBI, forcing him to possess other people; however, his hosts eventually decay, forcing him to find a surviving member of his family to be reborn. After possessing a police officer named Josh, Jason goes to his sister's house interrupting a phone call with her daughter. Seeing Jason's reflection in a mirror, Diana realizes her half-brother has possessed Josh and grabs a handgun from a drawer, shooting him in the head. Believing she had killed him, she steps over Josh's body only for Jason to grab her and tries to transfer his soul into her. However, the father of her granddaughter, Steven Freeman enters the house and seeing Diana being attacked, attacks Josh unaware that he is actually Jason. During the ensuing struggle, Diana is killed and Jason escapes.

Steven is blamed for her murder and arrested. Her daughter's current boyfriend, American Casefiles host Robert Campbell, later steals her body from the morgue and places it in the Voorhees house to have it found by the police to spice up his shows ratings, only for Jason to transfer his soul from Josh's body to Robert's. After his latest host is killed, Jason escapes in the form of a demonic fetus. He eventually ends up inside the cellar where Diana's body ended up and uses her body to completely resurrect himself, as he only requires the body of a Voorhees to be resurrected.

=== Doug ===
- Portrayed by Peter Barton
- Appears in: Friday the 13th: The Final Chapter
- Status: Deceased
- Died in: Friday the 13th: The Final Chapter

Doug is a very popular guy amongst the gang of friends that stay opposite the Jarvis house. He and his girlfriend Sara are a devoted couple and Sara has saved herself for him, that night she tells him she's ready, so they have sex in the shower. Sara then goes into the bedroom to blow dry her hair, leaving Doug singing in the shower. Jason then enters the bathroom, and Doug, seeing only a vague form through the shower's steamed-up door, mistakes him for his friend, Paul, before asking if Sara has returned. Jason smashes through the shower door and slams Doug's head against the tiled wall, crushing his skull and killing him.

Doug's body is seen a short while later, when Trish finds him impaled to the wall through the back of the neck.

=== Duke Johnson ===
- Portrayed by William Caskey Swaim
- Appears in: Friday the 13th: A New Beginning
- Status: Deceased
- Died in: Friday the 13th: A New Beginning

Duke Johnson is a paramedic and Roy Burns's partner. When Duke and Roy attend the murder of Joey, a resident at Pinehurst Halfway House, Roy appears distracted by Joey's corpse, Duke snaps him out of it, mocking the grief of the other residents seemingly angering Roy.

Pam later finds Duke dead with his throat slashed.

== E ==
=== Eddie ===
- Portrayed by John Robert Dixon
- Appears in: Friday the 13th: A New Beginning
- Status: Deceased
- Died in: Friday the 13th: A New Beginning

Eddie is a promiscuous teenager who is often getting trouble for being caught with girlfriend Tina on private property. He and Tina sneak into the woods and have sex. Eddie goes to freshen up at a nearby lake, as he is gone Tina is killed. When Eddie returns he discovers her corpse. As he backs away in horror against a tree a strap is thrown over his eyes and Roy Burns, masquerading as Jason, tightens it by twisting a branch attached to the strap eventually crushing Eddie's skull.

=== Elias Voorhees ===
- Portrayed by Hamish Linklater
- Appears in: Friday the 13th Part VI: Jason Lives (mentioned only), Jason Goes to Hell: The Final Friday (mentioned only), Crystal Lake
- Status: Deceased
- Died in: Crystal Lake (episode: "The Final Chapter")

Elias Voorhees (or simply Mr. Voorhees and Elias Wittering) is the husband of Pamela Voorhees, and the father of Jason Voorhees and Diana Kimble.

Hardly anything is known about this character, making him one of few mysteries surrounding Jason in the series. The nature of Elias is much debated among fans largely due to what little information is given in Friday the 13th Part VI: Jason Lives, which is the first installment to touch upon the character in any way. Though some scenes involving and mentioning Elias were edited out of the theatrical cut, it nevertheless is, to date, the most information given on the character.

According to Tom McLoughlin's treatment, the red-haired Elias is depicted as being silent, but quite intimidating. The caretaker of Jason's grave makes sure not to touch Elias's hand when taking his payment and is careful not to look into his eyes. There is a general belief that Elias is quite aware of what Jason is. This evidence stems from the fact that Elias paid for burials of Jason and Pamela rather than a cremation, which would have prevented Jason's resurrection. Additionally, at the end of the film, Elias is seemingly aware of the fact that Jason's body is no longer in his grave (in the deleted scene, he peers into the camera; in the novel, he looks in the direction of the lake where he was left defeated in the film).

The reason for abandoning his family also remains unknown and left up to fan speculation, but the closest thing to an answer is given in and with the writer of the first film, Victor Miller. When he was asked about the background of the father, Miller says that there was no time allowed for a proper backstory when they made the film, including that of Jason's father. The only idea Miller had was that Mr. Voorhees simply ran off at least in part because he could not handle Mrs. Voorhees's slightly unbalanced obsession with their child. Miller's wording does not make it clear if it was due to how Jason came out, though it is of note that Miller did not envision Jason with deformities. However, as this is only Miller's admitted assumption, the issue of discrepancies is moot.

Because the information regarding Elias does not derive from what made it to film, its canonicity is unknown. However, the ninth film Jason Goes to Hell: The Final Friday does briefly mention Elias as the father of Jason, securing the name, at least, as canon. Elias himself is present in an early screenplay of Jason Goes to Hell: The Final Friday written by Dean Lorey, in which he is the main antagonist and Jason's brother, instead of his father. The film's director, Adam Marcus, has stated that the version of Elias present in this early screenplay is "far more evil than Jason".

=== Eric Pope ===
- Portrayed by Dean Lorey
- Appears in: Jason Goes to Hell: The Final Friday
- Status: Deceased
- Died in: Jason Goes to Hell: The Final Friday

Eric Pope is Phil's assistant. After he returns from getting lunch, Pope tells Phil, who had just been possessed by Jason, that they could say whatever they wanted about Jason. Pope began insulting Jason, and Phil promptly stabbed Pope with a surgical probe and mangling his face on a grater, thereby killing him.

=== Enos ===
- Portrayed by Rex Everhart (1980) and Daniel Stewart Sherman (2026)
- Appears in: Friday the 13th (1980) and Crystal Lake (2026)
- Status: Alive

Enos is a friendly gentleman encountered by teenager Annie Phillips. He agrees to drive her part of the way to Camp Crystal Lake and, during the drive, he informs Annie about the 1958 murders of camp counselors Barry and Claudette, as well as the mysterious fires and water contamination. Unfortunately, his warnings are dismissed by Annie.

=== Ethel Hubbard ===
- Portrayed by Carol Locatell
- Appears in: Friday the 13th: A New Beginning
- Status: Deceased
- Died in: Friday the 13th: A New Beginning

Ethel Hubbard is a foul-mouthed, mean woman who owns the farm near to Pinehurst Halfway House. She and her son, Junior, are vehemently opposed to the facility, mainly due to residents Eddie and Tina having sex on her property and because she hates "crazies". She complains to Matt and the sheriff about the facility. Later, she offers a vagrant named Raymond food in exchange for labour. That night, Junior is beaten up by Tommy Jarvis in self defence as he screams at his mother riding erratically around the farm he is decapitated by a meat cleaver. Ethel hears his bike stop and tells him to come in, getting no response she begins to insult him. Suddenly a meat cleaver smashes through the window striking Ethel right between the eyes, she drops head first into her stew, dead.

=== Eva Watanabe ===
- Portrayed by Kelly Hu
- Appears in: Friday the 13th Part VIII: Jason Takes Manhattan
- Status: Deceased
- Died in: Friday the 13th Part VIII: Jason Takes Manhattan

Eva Watanabe is a female student of Ms. Van Deusen, first seen with the New York-bound group aboard the SS Lazarus. She is shown to be friends with Tamara Mason, and tries her best to emulate Tamara in small ways. When the pair sneak off to do cocaine, they are chanced upon by fellow student, Rennie Wickham, who declines Tamara's offer of a 'hit'. After almost being caught moments later by their teacher (and Rennie's uncle) Charles McCulloch, Tamara assumes that Rennie 'narced' on them, and, in revenge, intentionally knocks Rennie overboard. Disgusted at her friend's actions, Eva makes her excuses and leaves Tamara to her own devices. Later, after Jason's murderous activities endanger the ship, an announcement goes out for all students to gather on the bridge. Eva goes in search of Tamara, only to find her friend's mutilated body in her cabin. Horrified, Eva runs out of the room only to come face-to-face with Jason. After a brief chase, she finds herself on the ship's dance floor. Realizing that Jason has followed her, and already terrified, the strobe lighting and pounding music only serve to disorient her further as Jason appears to somehow be in several places at once (possibly the effects of drugs she and Tamara took earlier). Suddenly, Jason appears right in front of her. He grabs her around the neck, hoists her into the air and throttles the life from her.

== F ==
=== Freddy Krueger ===
- Portrayed by Robert Englund
- Appears in: Jason Goes to Hell: The Final Friday, Freddy vs. Jason
- Status: Alive

Frederick Charles "Freddy" Krueger is a horror icon and the main antagonist of the Nightmare on Elm Street franchise. He appears in several crossovers with the Friday the 13th series. In life, Freddy Krueger was a sadistic child murderer responsible for the deaths of some twenty children from the Elm Street area. Spared from prison due to a legal technicality, the enraged parents of the innocent children he butchered sought their own vengeance: they cornered him in the boiler room of the abandoned factory where Krueger had once worked, and where he would take his young victims, doused the place in gasoline, and set it ablaze, burning Krueger to death. In doing so, they unwittingly created a new reign of terror which their own children would be forced to suffer. Despite his fiery death, Krueger was somehow able to use the fear he induced to allow him to invade the dreams of his killers' children. In a nightmare world which he could seemingly manipulate at will, he used his supernatural powers to slaughter his teenage victims as they slept. His signature weapon, a home-made killing glove with four razor-sharp blades extending from each finger, made a cameo at the climax of Jason Goes to Hell: The Final Friday, and Freddy himself appeared fully in Freddy vs. Jason. In that film, Freddy has grown weak, unable to invade the dreams of potential victims as the people of Springwood, his home town, have managed to suppress their fear of him. Freddy, by impersonating Pamela Voorhees, manipulates Jason into going to Springwood, knowing that Jason's brutal murders will be attributed to him, causing panic and fear. It does not take Jason long to accomplish Freddy's goals, but when he refuses to stop killing, a ferocious battle ensues between the two iconic mass murderers, spanning both the dream-world and the campgrounds of Crystal Lake. The ultimate victor is left ambiguous, as Jason surfaces from the lake holding Freddy's severed head, which winks and laughs.

=== Fox ===
- Portrayed by Gloria Charles
- Appears in: Friday the 13th Part III, Friday the 13th: The Final Chapter
- Status: Deceased
- Died in: Friday the 13th Part III

Fox is part of a biker gang, and attempts to steal Shelly's wallet, harassing Vera when she tries to get it back. After Shelly destroys their bikes, Fox reluctantly joins the others in stealing gas from Chris's van. Fox then walks into the barn and starts fooling around, before being stabbed in the throat by Jason with a pitchfork.

Fox is also featured as a playable character in Friday the 13th: The Game.

== G ==
=== George Winter ===
- Portrayed by Vernon Washington
- Appears in: Friday the 13th: A New Beginning
- Status: Deceased
- Died in: Friday the 13th: A New Beginning

George Winter is a cook and maintenance man at Pinehurst Halfway House. He is Reggie's grandfather and shares a strong bond with him despite chastising him for his behaviour. He warns Reggie to behave when he goes to visit his brother, Demon.

George is not seen again until his dead body is thrown through a window, his eyes gouged out.

=== Ginny Field ===
- Portrayed by Amy Steel
- Appears in: Friday the 13th Part 2, Friday the 13th Part III, Friday the 13th: The Final Chapter
- Status: Alive

Virginia "Ginny" Field is a friend of Paul Holt, and arrives at Crystal Lake to partake in his counselor training camp. Familiar with the legend of "Camp Blood", she initially feels sorry for Jason Voorhees, sympathizing with his lonely childhood and the traumatic death of his mother. However, when Jason enters the camp and murders all the counselors, Ginny is forced to fight for her life. She eventually discovers Jason's shack in the woods, and dons Pamela Voorhees's old sweater in effort to convince him she is his mother. Jason falls for her plan, and she manages to calm him down before driving a machete into his shoulder. One of the final scenes in the movie is of Ginny being carried away in a stretcher, crying out for Paul, whose fate is unknown.

Ginny appears briefly in Friday the 13th Part III, using footage from Friday the 13th Part 2. She can be seen on a news report detailing the events of the last film.

== J ==
=== Jack Burrell ===
- Portrayed by Kevin Bacon
- Appears in: Friday the 13th (1980)
- Status: Deceased
- Died in: Friday the 13th (1980)

Jack Burrell and his girlfriend Marcie Stanler arrive at Camp Crystal Lake to help Steve Christy re-open it; however, they are more interested in sneaking off for fun. During a walk Jack listens as Marcie relays a story about a terrifying recurring dream. A storm breaks and Jack and Marcie take refuge in an old cabin and have sex. Marcie goes to freshen up in the camp bathrooms while Jack relaxes on the bed, suddenly, an arrow pierces Jack's throat from underneath the bed, killing him.

=== J.J. Jarrett ===
- Portrayed by Saffron Henderson
- Appears in: Friday the 13th Part VIII: Jason Takes Manhattan
- Status: Deceased
- Died in: Friday the 13th Part VIII: Jason Takes Manhattan

J.J. Jarrett is first seen aboard the SS Lazarus, playing her guitar while being filmed by her young friend, aspiring film school student, Wayne. After giving him some advice about women, she heads down into the lower decks of the ship to take advantage of the superior guitar acoustics the cavernous interior will offer. As J.J. loses herself in a jam session, she fails to notice Jason stalking her until the last minute. Upon seeing him, she panics and runs deeper into the bowels of the ship. After running down a flight of steps, she suddenly stops and lets out a blood-curdling scream as Jason appears in front of her wielding her guitar Jason swings the heavy instrument caving her skull in.

J.J's corpse is shown later when Wayne literally falls over her whilst fleeing from Jason.

=== Jake ===
- Portrayed by Jerry Pavlon
- Appears in: Friday the 13th: A New Beginning
- Status: Deceased
- Died in: Friday the 13th: A New Beginning

Jake is a shy awkward teenager who often stutters when nervous or anxious, he is attracted to fellow Pinehurst resident Robin. Jake is upset when Robin spurns his sexual advances, humiliated he storms upstairs to talk to Violet who is too busy dancing. Jake leaves Violet's room and sees a meat cleaver raised in the air, he tries to scream but stutters as the meat cleaver slams into his face.

Jake's body is discovered by Robin when she gets into bed, but before she can react, she is killed by a machete through her back.

=== Jane ===
- Portrayed by Staci Greason
- Appears in: Friday the 13th Part VII: The New Blood
- Status: Deceased
- Died in: Friday the 13th Part VIII: The New Blood

Jane is the girlfriend of Michael Rogers, whose surprise birthday party, thrown by his cousin and their friends, the pair are en route to when their car breaks down, forcing them to walk the remainder of the way through the woods. They decide to take a quick break so that Michael can relieve himself. While Jane waits a short distance away, Jason, having just been resurrected from the depths of Crystal Lake, surprises her. Grabbing her from behind, he covers her mouth to stifle her screams, before pushing her against a tree and ramming a metal tent spike through the front of her throat, killing her and pinning her body to the tree.

=== Janessa ===
- Portrayed by Melyssa Ade
- Appears in: Jason X
- Status: Deceased
- Died in: Jason X

Janessa, is one of the futuristic college students from Jason X. She has a wry sense of humor, and frequently trades insults with Tsuarnon, who she seems to have an unrequited crush on. She acts as a dominatrix for her professor in exchange for a better grade. She spends most of Jason's rampage avoiding the action and trying to take care of a traumatized Kinsa. In the climax, Jason punches a hole through the spaceship, depressurizing it, and causing people and objects to be sucked toward the hole. Janessa isn't wearing a spacesuit and grabs at the floor, but eventually loses her grip and is yanked through a grate and into the vacuum of space. Upon realizing what's about to happen, her last words are a bitter exclamation that "Oh, this sucks on so many levels."

=== Jason Voorhees ===
- Portrayed by Ari Lehman (1980), Steve Daskewisz (Part 2), Warrington Gillette (Part 2; unmasked), Richard Brooker (Part III), Ted White (The Final Chapter), C. J. Graham (Part VI), Kane Hodder (Part VII, Part VIII, Jason Goes to Hell, Jason X), Ken Kirzinger (Freddy vs. Jason), Spencer Stump (Freddy vs. Jason; young), Derek Mears (2009), Caleb Guss (2009; young), Callum Vinson (2026; young), Jonathan Tison (2026; teenage)
- Appears in: Friday the 13th (1980), Friday the 13th Part 2, Friday the 13th Part III, Friday the 13th: The Final Chapter, Friday the 13th: A New Beginning, Friday the 13th Part VI: Jason Lives, Friday the 13th Part VII: The New Blood, Friday the 13th Part VIII: Jason Takes Manhattan, Jason Goes to Hell: The Final Friday, Jason X, Freddy vs. Jason, Friday the 13th (2009), Crystal Lake (2026)
- Status: Alive (Freddy vs. Jason) & (Crystal Lake) / Deceased (original timeline) / Unknown (reboot)
- Died in: Jason X

Jason Voorhees is the main antagonist in the Friday the 13th series. He first appeared in Friday the 13th as Mrs. Voorhees's son. Created in combination by Victor Miller, Ron Kurz, Sean S. Cunningham and Tom Savini, he was never intended to carry the series as the main villain. Jason Voorhees has also been represented in numerous novels, comic books, and a cross-over film with another horror legend, Freddy Krueger.

The character has primarily been an antagonist in the films, whether by stalking and killing the characters, or acting as a psychological threat to the lead character, as is the case in Friday the 13th: A New Beginning. Since Lehman's portrayal, the character has been represented by numerous actors and stuntmen, sometimes by more than one at a time; this has caused some controversy as to who should receive credit for the portrayal. In the fifth film, Jason is knocked off the edge of a barn loft and lands on a tractor harrow below, which impales him through the chest. The end of the film reveals that a character shown earlier as a paramedic, Roy, was using the hockey mask and boiler suit to imitate Jason to carry out his revenge-driven killing spree. This mask differs from those seen in the previous films, featuring two blue markings instead of three red markings. Kane Hodder is the most well known of the stuntmen to have portrayed Jason Voorhees, having played the character in four consecutive films.

The character's physical appearance has gone through many transformations, with various special makeup effects artists making their mark on the character's design, including makeup artist Stan Winston. Tom Savini's initial design has been the basis for many of the later incarnations. The trademark hockey mask did not appear until Friday the 13th Part III. Since Friday the 13th Part VI: Jason Lives, filmmakers have given Jason superhuman strength, and near invulnerability. He has been seen as a sympathetic character, albeit one whose motivation for killing has been cited as driven by the immoral actions of his victims.

Jason Voorhees has been featured in many humor magazines, referenced in feature films, parodied in television shows, and been the inspiration for a horror punk band. Several toy lines have been released based on various versions of the character from the Friday the 13th films. Jason Voorhees's hockey mask has become one of the most recognizable images in popular culture.

=== Jeff ===
- Portrayed by Bill Randolph
- Appears in: Friday the 13th Part 2, Friday the 13th: The Final Chapter, Friday the 13th Part VII: The New Blood
- Status: Deceased
- Died in: Friday the 13th Part 2

Jeff and girlfriend Sandra Dier visit Camp Crystal Lake in the Summer of 1984 on a counselor program. One night they go to the bedroom to have sex. Jason Vorhees enters the house and grabs a spear, he walks upstairs and enters the room where Jeff and Sandra are in bed. Sandra sees Jason and gasps but Jeff does not see him. Jason spears them both with such force that the spear goes through the bed to the floor killing them both instantly.

Jeff's body is seen hung up on the door discovered by Vickie in her death scene.

=== Jenna ===
- Portrayed by Danielle Panabaker
- Appears in: Friday the 13th (2009)
- Status: Deceased
- Died in: Friday the 13th (2009)

Jenna is Trent's girlfriend. She is athletic, nice, and adventurous. She meets Clay at a gas station and immediately feels an attraction for him. Jenna and Clay eventually meet up again, and she decides to help him look for his sister, Whitney. Jenna and Clay stumble upon Jason's home and return to the cabin where most of Jenna's friends are dead. Jenna, Clay and Trent are left and Trent wants to leave with Jenna while Clay wants to go find his sister. Jenna ends up deciding to stay with Clay, angering Trent even more. When Jenna and Clay find Jason's lair they find Clay's sister. As Clay attempts to free Whitney, Jenna hears Jason coming and warns Clay to hurry. Jenna, Clay and the now released Whitney attempt to escape and they eventually find an exit. When Whitney and Clay are safe Clay attempts to help Jenna but Jason stabs her in the chest after sneaking up behind her.

=== Jessica Kimble ===
- Portrayed by Kari Keegan
- Appears in: Jason Goes to Hell: The Final Friday
- Status: Alive

Jessica Kimble is the niece of Jason Voorhees and daughter of Diana Kimble. While searching for a host body, Jason tries to transfer his soul into Jessica's baby, Stephanie, but later claims Diana's instead. Being a Voorhees, Jessica is the only one who can kill Jason, and is responsible for sending him to Hell with an enchanted dagger after he recreates his body after possessing Diana's body.

Dean Lorey, the writer of Jason Goes to Hell: The Final Friday, has stated he had Jessica be a mother because "I thought that a mother fighting to protect her baby would really up the stakes and elevate the movie." Lorey would later regret this decision, agreeing with film director Adam Marcus that Jessica having a child "made her less sexy and, therefore, less appealing to the core audience."

=== Jim Miller ===
- Portrayed by Todd Caldecott
- Appears in: Friday the 13th Part VIII: Jason Takes Manhattan
- Status: Deceased
- Died in: Friday the 13th Part VIII: Jason Takes Manhattan

Jim Miller is the one who accidentally brings Jason back to life. He is a Lakeview High Student. While on his boat travelling to the Lazarus graduation party ship, he and his girlfriend Suzie have sex. He plays a trick on Suzie scaring her in a hockey mask, she is initially angry but they go back to bed leaving the hockey mask on the boat's wheel. Meanwhile, Jason has boarded the boat, he takes the mask and fires a harpoon gun at Jim and Suzie, Suzie runs out the open window but Jim is disemboweled with the harpoon.

=== Jimmy ===
- Portrayed by Crispin Glover
- Appears in: Friday the 13th: The Final Chapter
- Status: Deceased
- Died in: Friday the 13th: The Final Chapter

Jimmy joins his friends in 1984 on a trip to a summer house at Crystal Lake, after an unsettling breakup with his girlfriend, not knowing the murderous Jason Voorhees is still on the loose. His friend Ted teases him as being a "dead fuck" and convinces him to find someone new. Sure enough, the gang meets local twins Tina and Terri. Jimmy proves he is not a "dead fuck" after he sleeps with Tina. He then goes to gloat to Ted and celebrate with a bottle of wine. While searching for a corkscrew, Jason appears from the shadows and slams it on Jimmy's hand before hitting him in the face with a meat cleaver, killing him.

=== Joey Burns ===
- Portrayed by Dominick Brascia
- Appears in: Friday the 13th: A New Beginning
- Status: Deceased
- Died in: Friday the 13th: A New Beginning

Joey Burns is an overweight gentle man and resident of the Pinehurst Youth Development Center for social outcasts and adolescents with behavioural problems. He was the son of Roy Burns and unnamed mother who died during childbirth. Joey is killed by a violent resident named Vic who hacks him to pieces.

His murder triggers Roy's killing spree.

=== Deputy Josh ===
- Portrayed by Andrew Bloch
- Appears in: Jason Goes to Hell: The Final Friday
- Status: Deceased
- Died in: Jason Goes to Hell: The Final Friday

Deputy Josh is a police officer, and had a wife, Edna. Josh had an affair with Diane Kimble, though Diane was unaware of that Josh was married. A Jason-possessed Phil attacked both Josh and Edna, killing Edna and capturing Josh. After giving him a shave, Jason possessed Josh. In Josh's body, Jason killed Diane, but was stopped from possessing her corpse by Steven. Jason later possessed Robert, causing Josh to regain consciousness before discovering to his horror that he was melting to death.

In deleted scenes, the Jason-possessed Josh kills Vicki's boyfriend and a man inside of a bathroom.

=== Julius ===
- Portrayed by Vincent Craig Dupree
- Appears in: Friday the 13th Part VIII: Jason Takes Manhattan
- Status: Deceased
- Died in: Friday the 13th Part VIII: Jason Takes Manhattan

Julius is an avid boxer who is highly competitive and has a tendency to leap before he looks. He is easily the best boxer at Lakeview High School, and is part of the graduating party on the SS Lazarus on their trip to New York City where he spends his time doing what he loves. After the captain and his first mate are murdered, he decides to override McCulloch's authority and rallies the rest of the students to hunt down the killer. He is caught by Jason and overpowered before being thrown overboard. After Charles McCulloch, Colleen Van Deusen and his classmates Rennie and Sean escape the ship via life raft, Julius and Rennie's dog Toby are recovered alive. They make their way to New York on the life raft where Rennie is kidnapped by a pair of punks, and McCulloch advises they split up to find help.

Finding a payphone, Julius tries to call for the police, but he is attacked by Jason. Fleeing Jason up a fire escape and onto a roof, he finds himself unable to escape and he decides to beat Jason down. Punching Jason and making him back away across the roof, Julius soon becomes exhausted and his fists start bleeding from punching Jason's mask. Unable to make any more ground, Julius tells Jason to "Take your best shot"; Jason decapitates Julius with a single blow. Later, his head is stuck on a pike and is discovered in a police car by Rennie, Sean, McCulloch, Colleen and a police officer.

=== Junior Hubbard ===
- Portrayed by Ron Sloan
- Appears in: Friday the 13th: A New Beginning
- Status: Deceased
- Died in: Friday the 13th: A New Beginning

Junior Hubbard is the somewhat simple son of Ethel Hubbard, both Junior and Ethel oppose Pinehurst's endeavours to help the young people in the facility. Junior often angers Ethel and he is oblivious to her insults. One night he encounters Tommy Jarvis, he labels him as crazy and attempts to attack him but Tommy severely beats up Junior. Upset, Junior erratically rides his bike around the farm as Ethel yells at him to come inside, Junior shouts to his mother to "chop "em and kill 'em". As he revs his bike again, he drives past a tree and is decapitated by a meat cleaver that appears from behind it, his head is seen falling to the ground.

== K ==
=== Kate ===
- Portrayed by Diane Almeida
- Appears in: Friday the 13th Part VII: The New Blood
- Status: Deceased
- Died in: Friday the 13th Part VII: The New Blood

Kate is one of Michael's friends and is first shown at the house where Michael's surprise birthday party is taking place. Her boyfriend is Ben and early on it is shown that there is some tension between them after David slips up and reveals something unbeknownst to Kate, which Ben quickly tries to cover. They make up and head out to the van where while in the middle of having sex, begin to hear noises outside the van, as well as it shaking here and there. They believe that it is Michael screwing around with them, so Ben goes out to try to scare him, leaving Kate in the van. Kate calls out to Ben several times with no reply, not knowing that he had just been killed by Jason. She crawls into the front seat and sticks her head out the window, calling for Ben and telling him to quit fooling around. Suddenly Jason appears, grabbing her by the back of the neck, and taking a party horn and ramming it into her eye, killing her.

Her body is later shown along with Sandra's, Maddy's and Russell's when Tina discovers them.

=== KM-14 ===
- Portrayed by Lisa Ryder
- Appears in: Jason X
- Status: Alive

KM-14 (aka Kay-Em) is a gynoid who accompanies Professor Braithwaite Lowe and his students on their field trip to Earth in 2455, when they discover the frozen Jason and Rowan LaFontaine. She is the one who reveals that Rowan is still alive and perfectly preserved, leading to her being revived on board the Grendel. She is among the survivors of Jason's attack on the Grendel. While the other survivors prepare to escape on the shuttle, Kay-Em goes off with Tsunaron, who ends up making out with her. Tsunaron later upgrades Kay-Em into a combat android complete with an array of weapons and new combat skills to take on Jason. She fights Jason off and seemingly kills him, knocking him into a nanite-equipped medical station and blasting off his right arm, left leg, right rib cage, and, finally, part of his head. However, Jason is resurrected by the malfunctioning medical station into a more powerful cyborg called Uber Jason. Kay-Em tries to destroy his body as she had before, but his new body is impervious to her weapons and he easily defeats her by punching her head off, though she remains functional and is saved by her lover Tsunaron. She later helps Tsunaron create a holographic simulation of Crystal Lake to distract Jason, to allow the others time to open the door to the patrol ship, Tiamat. She, Tsunaron, and Rowan are the only survivors of Uber Jason's rampage and Tsunaron promises to get her a new body.

== L ==
=== Loco ===
- Portrayed by Kevin O'Brien
- Appears in: Friday the 13th Part III, Friday the 13th: The Final Chapter
- Status: Deceased
- Died in: Friday the 13th Part III

Loco is one of the members of a biker gang consisting of Fox, Ali, and himself. After Shelly accidentally destroys their bikes after a heated confrontation at a convenience store, the bikers arrive at Higgins Haven to drain the gas from Chris's van. When Fox starts fooling around in the barn, Loco goes in after her to tell her to stop fooling around. Loco then discovers her corpse pinned to a beam in the barn, a pitchfork through her throat, Loco, himself, is then impaled in the abdomen with a pitchfork by Jason.

=== Lori Campbell ===
- Portrayed by Monica Keena
- Appears in: Freddy vs. Jason
- Status: Alive

Lori Campbell is a character whose name was inspired by both character Laurie Strode from the Halloween franchise and actress Neve Campbell who played Sidney Prescott in the horror film Scream. Being one of the few residents of Springwood who realizes Jason Voorhees is responsible for the recent string of murders there and not Freddy Krueger, Lori and her boyfriend Will, along with their friends, make several attempts to stop the latter's return to full power. After a failed attempt at retrieving the dream suppressant Hypnocil and after Jason is left comatose due to the machinations of Freddy, Lori volunteers to enter the dream world and confront Freddy there and bring him to earth; after nearly being raped by Freddy and learning he was responsible for the death of her mother as a child, Lori does successfully force him into entering the real world, where he and the reawakened Jason battle in Crystal Lake. In the end, Lori blows up the dock the two are fighting on with gasoline and propane, and later decapitates Freddy, whose body falls into the depths of Crystal Lake, along with Jason.

In an unused ending for Freddy vs. Jason, Lori dies when, while having sex with Will two months after Jason and Freddy's battle, he transforms into Freddy and proceeds to kill her. This scene is retained in the novelization of the film.

Monica Keena has praised the depth of her character, claiming "I think Lori's a very independent and tough character. She has an arc in the film because she learns that Freddy killed her mother and that inspires her to have a need to get revenge. She's the real hero of the story." Jeff Katz, who worked on the original screenplay for Freddy vs. Jason vs. Ash, explains that Lori and Will's deaths were a way to continue the long-running tradition of Friday the 13th and Nightmare on Elm Street survivors being killed off in subsequent films.

=== Luke ===
- Portrayed by Michael B. Silver
- Appears in: Jason Goes to Hell: The Final Friday
- Status: Deceased
- Died in: Jason Goes to Hell: The Final Friday

Luke, along with his girlfriend Deborah and Alexis, hitchhiked to Crystal Lake to celebrate Jason's "death", getting a ride from Steven Freeman. While having sex with Deborah, a Jason-possessed Phil impales them both with a pole.

== M ==
=== Maddy ===
- Portrayed by Diana Barrows
- Appears in: Friday the 13th Part VII: The New Blood
- Status: Deceased
- Died in: Friday the 13th Part VII: The New Blood

Maddy is first seen at the house where the party is taking place for Michael. She is a quiet, shy type who appears to share a close friendship with Robin and, like Robin, has an attraction for David. She is also one of the few people to show any kindness to Tina during her brief visit. Later in the evening, after asking Robin about the way David looked at her, Maddy is offended when Robin tells her to "get real" and that "you're not his type." Maddy storms off, disappearing upstairs.

When we next see her, she has given herself a makeover, wearing makeup with her hair styled and dressed more provocatively. She ventures out of the house in search of David, but ends up finding the body of Russell, which tumbles out of the tree which he was tied up into. Jason appears and chases Maddy into a small shed like building. She hides, and it appears that she may have given him the slip. Suddenly, Jason's arm comes bursting through the wall directly behind her, grabbing her, followed by his other hand, which is wielding a sickle, which he swings into her neck, killing her.

Her body is shown later along with Kate's, Sandra's and Russell's.

=== Marcie ===
- Portrayed by Jeannine Taylor
- Appears in: Friday the 13th (1980)
- Status: Deceased
- Died in: Friday the 13th (1980)

Marcie was the girlfriend of Jack Burell and the friend of Ned Rubenstein. Marcie, Jack and Ned were a stoner three-person gang. She spent most of the day messing around like the other counselers. After explaining to Jack her fear of thunder storms, they sneak into a cabin to have sex. Marcie goes in the bathroom while Jack is murdered by Mrs. Voorhees who then sneaks into the bathroom and slams an axe in her face, killing her.

=== Mark ===
- Portrayed by Tom McBride
- Appears in: Friday the 13th Part 2, Friday the 13th: The Final Chapter, Friday the 13th Part VII: The New Blood
- Status: Deceased
- Died in: Friday the 13th Part 2

Mark is unable to walk, but still likes to keep fit. He plays video games with the other guys and gets the attention of Vickie Perry. They talk and Mark tells her he doesn't plan to be in a wheelchair his entire life, the two kiss and Vickie leaves to freshen up. Mark goes outside to look around—unbeknownst to him, Jason approaches from behind and kills him by slamming a machete into his face, hurling him down a flight of stairs.

=== Martin ===
- Portrayed by Bob Larkin
- Appears in: Friday the 13th Part VI: Jason Lives
- Status: Deceased
- Died in: Friday the 13th Part VI: Jason Lives

Martin is a local gravedigger and resident drunk. He is annoyed when he finds Jason Voorhees's grave dug up. When Tommy Jarvis returns to the graveyard with Sheriff Garris and Deputy Cologne he orders Martin to dig it up to prove Jason isn't in his grave, Martin scoffs at the idea as Tommy is taken away. Later, a drunk Martin tosses his empty bottle of whiskey, when he doesn't hear it smash he turns around and is shocked to see Jason standing there. Jason crushes the bottle and stabs Martin in the throat with it then finishes him off with his machete.

=== Matthew Letter ===
- Portrayed by Richard Young
- Appears in: Friday the 13th: A New Beginning
- Status: Deceased
- Died in: Friday the 13th: A New Beginning

Matthew Letter (often referred to as Matt) is a doctor at Pinehurst Halfway House aided by director Pam Roberts, who he has a strong friendship with. He has great affection for all of the young people at the facility. When resident Joey is killed by fellow resident Vic, Matt witnesses it and phones the police and paramedics. He talks to Sheriff Tucker as Joey's body is taken away by Roy Burns and his partner Duke. Later in the day randy teens Eddie and Tina go missing and Matt decides to go looking for them but fails to return. When Pam is fleeing from "Jason" she finds Matt's body, his throat slit and pinned to a tree with a railroad spike.

Matt is one of four characters from the movie to be killed off-screen, the others being George, Demon's girlfriend Anita and Duke.

=== Megan Garris ===
- Portrayed by Jennifer Cooke
- Appears in: Friday the 13th Part VI: Jason Lives
- Status: Alive

Megan Garris is a counselor working at the rebuilt and renamed Camp Forest Green, she is also the daughter of the local sheriff. Megan finds herself drawn to Tommy Jarvis, who claims to have brought local killer Jason Voorhees back from the dead while trying to cremate his body. Rebelling against her father's wishes and more than slightly motivated by the fact that she knows Tommy did not commit the murders as he was with her at the time one was being committed, she releases Tommy from jail and helps him track down Jason. When Jason arrives at Camp Forest Green and enters the children's cabin, Megan lures him out before he can hurt the children, Tommy subsequently calling Jason over to a boat on the lake. Although he manages to tie weights to Jason's feet, Tommy nearly drowns in the process, but Megan is able to get him back to land and stop Jason by cutting his neck and face with a speedboat motor, subsequently performing CPR on Tommy and saving his life.

Jennifer Cooke was at first hesitant to appear in Friday the 13th Part VI: Jason Lives, but decided to take the part of Megan due to the pay. Cooke found her experience as Megan enjoyable though, stating "My character, Megan, was likeable and funny, and I got to drive a car fast."

=== Melissa ===
- Portrayed by Susan Jennifer Sullivan
- Appears in: Friday the 13th Part VII: The New Blood
- Status: Deceased
- Died in: Friday the 13th Part VII: The New Blood

Melissa first appears at the house scene where the party is taking place for Michael. She has a huge attraction to Nick, and becomes jealous when she sees that he is more interested in Tina. She then starts to pick on and tease Tina, which only results in Nick becoming more distant towards her and more protective towards Tina. She then feigns being interested in joker Eddie to try to make Nick jealous, which garners no results.

Later that evening, she ups the fake interest in Eddie further by planning on sleeping with him, but at the last second, she changes her mind and instead goes out in search of Nick. She is later shown, having found Nick, back at Tina's. Upon hearing their stories, she does not believe them for a second and begins to storm out. She opens the door and encounters Jason, who proceeds to slam an axe into her head, killing her and throwing her body across the room.

=== Miles Wolfe ===
- Portrayed by Gordon Currie
- Appears in: Friday the 13th Part VIII: Jason Takes Manhattan
- Status: Deceased
- Died in: Friday the 13th Part VIII: Jason Takes Manhattan

Miles Wolfe is friends with Sean Robertson and is first seen when Sean argues with his father, later, he joins in the hunt for Jason with the other male students; however, as he tries to attack Jason with an axe he is disarmed, he runs up the ship's mast only to be grabbed by Jason and hurled from the top impaling him on the ship's communication device.

His body is found moments later by Julias Gaw.

Apparently, Miles was meant to have a bigger role in the original draft including dialogue and referencing that he is an Olympic diver.

=== Mrs. Tracy Jarvis ===
- Portrayed by Joan Freeman
- Appears in: Friday the 13th: The Final Chapter
- Status: Deceased
- Died in: Friday the 13th: The Final Chapter

Mrs. Tracy Jarvis is the mother of Trish and Tommy Jarvis. She is shown to be maternal and shares a loving relationship with her children. While Trish and Tommy are out Mrs Jarvis hears a noise. She ventures outside to investigate and is, presumably, killed by Jason off screen.

Mrs. Jarvis was originally meant to be found dead by Trish, photography of her dead body emerged in later years.

== N ==
=== Ned Rubenstein ===
- Portrayed by Mark Nelson
- Appears in: Friday the 13th (1980)
- Status: Deceased
- Died in: Friday the 13th (1980)

Ned "Neddy" Rubenstein is good friends with Jack Burrell and Marcie Cunningham and travels with them to Crystal Lake to help Steve Christy re-open the abandoned summer camp. Ned is a practical joker and likes to make people laugh; however, the group are taken aback when Ned appears to be drowning but upon rescuing him find out it was a joke to get to kiss Brenda as she gave him mouth-to-mouth resuscitation. Ned goes on a walk and sees a mysterious figure enter a cabin, he follows them in and is killed off-screen.

Later, Jack and Marcie have sex in the same cabin unaware that Ned's corpse is laying above them with his throat slit.

=== Nikki ===
- Portrayed by Darcy DeMoss
- Appears in: Friday the 13th Part VI: Jason Lives, Friday the 13th Part VII: The New Blood
- Status: Deceased
- Died in: Friday the 13th Part VI: Jason Lives

Nikki is Cort's girlfriend and while having sex in her RV the power is cut. Upon investigating and finding the power cable cut she agrees with Cort to leave; however, Cort decides to drive the RV recklessly and Nikki is thrown backwards, moments later she is pulled into the bathroom by Jason, her screams for help muffled, and killed when her face is rammed into the mirror leaving an imprint in the wall.

=== Nurse Robbie Morgan ===
- Portrayed by Lisa Freeman
- Appears in: Friday the 13th: The Final Chapter
- Status: Deceased
- Died in: Friday the 13th: The Final Chapter

Nurse Robbie Morgan was a nurse at the hospital that Jason's body is taken to after the events of Friday the 13th Part III. After going to meet Axel in the cold room she is scared by him, however, he apologizes and they then began making out, until Jason's hand drops off of the gurney and startles her. Morgan leaves and heads into the supply room. She accidentally knocks over some jars. While cleaning them, Jason enters turns off the lights, grabs her by the throat, holds her up against the wall and disembowels her with a scalpel.

== P ==
=== Pam Roberts ===
- Portrayed by Melanie Kinnaman
- Appears in: Friday the 13th: A New Beginning
- Status: Unknown

Pam Roberts is an 17 year old who works as the assistant director of the Pinehurst halfway house in Crystal Lake, she was Tommy Jarvis ex girlfriend before Tommy dated Megan. she is forced to protect herself and a young boy named Reggie (whose brother and grandpa were killed) from machete-wielding killer Roy Burns. The film ends with the implication that Pam is killed by Tommy Jarvis, but her fate is never revealed in the series.

Melanie Kinnaman was to reprise her role as Pam in the sixth Friday the 13th and died in the original script, but was cut when it was decided that the film would not be a direct sequel to Friday the 13th: A New Beginning.

=== Pamela Voorhees ===
- Portrayed by Betsy Palmer (1980 - Part 2), Paula Shaw (Freddy vs. Jason), Nana Visitor (2009), Kathleen Garrett (2009; voice), Linda Cardellini (2026)
- Appears in: Friday the 13th (1980), Friday the 13th Part 2, Freddy vs. Jason, Friday the 13th (2009), Crystal Lake (2026)
- Status: Alive (Crystal Lake) / Deceased (original timeline)
- Died in: Friday the 13th (1980) and Friday the 13th (2009)

Pamela Voorhees is the mother of Jason and the main antagonist in the original Friday the 13th. She was beheaded by Alice Hardy.

=== Paula ===
- Portrayed by Kerry Noonan
- Appears in: Friday the 13th Part VI: Jason Lives, Friday the 13th Part VII: The New Blood
- Status: Deceased
- Died in: Friday the 13th Part VI: Jason Lives

Paula arrives at Forest Green to help her friends Megan, Sissy and Cort run a summer camp for young children. Paula is the most sensible counsellor at the camp and prepares with Sissy for their arrival. Later Paula is trying to sleep as Sissy is killed, Paula dismisses it as a her friends joking around. She is awoken by one of the little girls at the summer camp called Nancy who claims she saw a "scary man", Paula comforts the little girl and takes her back to bed. Paula returns to the cabin and is spooked at the door blowing open, she sighs in relief as she realises it is the wind and goes to shut the door just as Jason bursts into the cabin, Paula screams and is thrown through a window head first then pulled back in by Jason and killed off-screen.

Sheriff Garris and later, Megan, discover Paula's cabin completely covered in her blood but her body is never seen again.

=== Paul ===
- Portrayed by Clyde Hayes
- Appears in: Friday the 13th: The Final Chapter
- Status: Deceased
- Died in: Friday the 13th: The Final Chapter

Paul is the boyfriend of Samantha. In the summer of 1984, Paul goes with his friends to spend the weekend at Crystal Lake. While there, Tina—one of the twins—starts flirting with him, which angers Samantha who storms out of the house to go skinny dipping. He then rejects Tina and goes looking for Sam (whom he finds dead). He then panics and is stabbed in the groin with a harpoon gun by Jason which kills him.

=== Paul Holt ===
- Portrayed by John Furey
- Appears in: Friday the 13th Part 2, Friday the 13th Part III
- Status: Unknown

Paul Holt is the head of a group of hopeful camp counselors operating close to the original "Camp Blood" on Crystal Lake. Confident and sure, he defies several warnings that he is too close to where the killings happen. Having to balance a professional and personal relationship with his girlfriend Ginny Field, he proves to be a capable leader. When several of the counselors leave for one last night on the town, Ginny suggests putting Jason in real terms, but Paul dismisses it on the idea that Jason is just an urban legend. He is proven wrong when he and Ginny return to the camp, and they find Jason lying in the dark, wait for them. After a brief struggle with Jason, Paul is left for dead as Jason chases Ginny around the camp and into the woods. Paul eventually catches up to them as Jason is about to kill her, but is overpowered and wrestled to the ground. He is nearly killed before Ginny slices Jason's shoulder with a machete, seemingly killing him. Paul then carries a weakened and shocked Ginny back to the camp, and goes to defend her when they think someone is at the cabin door, opening it to find Terry's dog Muffin on the other side. Ginny goes to call for Muffin and an unmasked Jason suddenly bursts through the window behind her.

By the time Ginny awakens, Paul has vanished and she gets no response as she calls for him while being placed in an ambulance. Paul's fate is ultimately left ambiguous, though it is strongly implied in the following film that the scene where Jason attacked Ginny unmasked was a hallucination.

=== Pete ===
- Portrayed by Corey Parker
- Appears in: Friday the 13th: A New Beginning, Friday the 13th Part VI: Jason Lives, Friday the 13th Part VII: The New Blood
- Status: Deceased
- Died in: Friday the 13th: A New Beginning

Pete is stranded with his best friend Vinnie when his car breaks down in the woods. Pushy and wanting to get laid, Pete orders Vinnie to fix the car by the time he gets back from "taking a dump". He is briefly startled by a rabbit he sees in the woods, unaware that Vinnie is being killed by Roy Burns (disguised as Jason). He returns to the car and sees Vinnie propped in the engine and tells him he's a "dead man" if he hasn't fixed the car. He gets in the car, which finally starts after several attempts and he tells Vinnie "Let's GO!" Before Roy; hidden behind the driver's seat, grabs his head and slits his throat with a machete he falls onto the horn dead.

=== Phil ===
- Portrayed by Richard E. Gant
- Appears in: Jason Goes to Hell: The Final Friday
- Status: Deceased
- Died in: Jason Goes to Hell: The Final Friday

Phil is an African-American coroner who examines Jason's remains after he is blown up by the FBI. While examining Jason's heart, he discovers a mysterious black liquid that he concludes is not blood before the heart starts beating and causes him to inexplicably consume it, causing Jason to possess him. In Phil's body, Jason kills Phil's assistant (Eric) and the two FBI guards outside, before returning to Crystal Lake. He finds three partying teens whom he then kills. He then attacks two police officers, Edna and Josh. He kills Edna by smashing her head into a car door, before abducting Josh. After giving Josh a shave, he transfers his soul from Phil's body to Josh's.

Later in the film, it is revealed that when Jason possesses a new host, his previous host decomposes and dies, indicating that this is presumably what happened to Phil's body.

== R ==
=== Raymond Joffroy ===
- Portrayed by Sonny Shields
- Appears in: Friday the 13th: A New Beginning
- Status: Deceased
- Died in: Friday the 13th: A New Beginning

Raymond Joffroy is a vagrant living in the area. He first appears at Ethel Hubbard's farm asking for food in exchange for labour. Ethel tells him to muck out the chickens then she'll feed him, he is appreciative and leaves. Later, he spies on Tina and Eddie getting frisky in the woods. A snap of a twig draws his attention to a figure and he is stabbed and killed.

=== Reggie Winter ===
- Portrayed by Shavar Ross
- Appears in: Friday the 13th: A New Beginning
- Status: Alive

Reggie Winter lives with his grandfather George at Pinehurst Halfway House. He is the youngest member of Pinehurst at 14, and he often acts childish and immature. Upon meeting Tommy Jarvis he pranks him with a rubber spider, Tommy responds by scaring Reggie with a mask. Later in the day Pam Roberts drives Reggie to see his brother Demon, Tommy tags along reluctantly but runs off after beating up Junior Hubbard. Pam drops Reggie off at Pinehurst to go and search for Tommy. Reggie falls asleep but wakes up when a storm breaks, he goes upstairs and discovers Robin, Jake and Violet's corpses in Tommy's room. Pam returns and Reggie tells her to go into Tommy's room. Pam screams and grabs Reggie and they flee through the woods. Pam is attacked by Roy Burns (masquerading as Jason), suddenly Reggie comes out of the barn driving a tractor and sends the killer flying, injuring him. Reggie and Pam run into the barn pursued by Roy, as Roy prepares to kill Reggie, Tommy appears, Tommy is attacked as he thinks he is hallucinating. Reggie leaps on Roy as he prepares to kill Pam but Roy grabs Reggie too, Tommy slices Roy's hand with a machete and Roy falls to his death onto a harrow below as Tommy, Pam and Reggie look down at Roy's body.

Apparently Shavar Ross (along with Melanie Kinnaman) was set to reprise the role of Reggie in Friday the 13th Part VI: Jason Lives. Unconfirmed reports state Reggie was set to be the friend Tommy took to Jason's grave in the opening scene and is killed by Jason but rewrites changed the original plans.

=== Rennie Wickham ===
- Portrayed by Jensen Daggett and Amber Pawlick (child)
- Appears in: Friday the 13th Part VIII: Jason Takes Manhattan
- Status: Alive

Rennie Wickham was pushed into Crystal Lake by her uncle when she was young, in an attempt to make her swim, and nearly dies when a young Jason attempts to drag her underwater. During the events of the film, Rennie is traveling to New York on the cruise ship Lazarus when Jason climbs on to it when it passes through Crystal Lake. As Jason begins killing everyone aboard, Rennie, her dog and a handful of others manage to flee from him and reach Manhattan after Jason sinks the ship. Tracking Rennie and her boyfriend Sean Robertson down after killing the other survivors from the ship, Jason chases them through New York and into the city sewer system. It is there that Rennie and Sean defeat Jason, flinging toxic waste at his face and climbing back to the surface as the sewer floods, sweeping Jason, who seemingly regresses back to a child, although this could be Rennie's perception. Safe from Jason, Rennie and Sean reunite with Rennie's pet dog Toby in the middle of Times Square.

=== Rick Bombay ===
- Portrayed by Paul Kratka
- Appears in: Friday the 13th Part III, Friday the 13th: The Final Chapter
- Status: Deceased
- Died in: Friday the 13th Part III

Rick Bombay Rick arrives at Higgins Haven to see girlfriend Chris Higgins. They later head into the woods, but Rick's car won't start so they sit down. Chris recalls a story to Rick about an encounter with a deformed man (implied to be Jason). She tells Rick she returned to face her fears. On Rick's suggestion he and Chris return to Higgins Haven to find it empty in disarray with no one around. They search for their friends but find only a blood-covered sweater. Rick goes outside to search the area. Chris, concerned over the time Rick is taking, goes outside and calls to him; however, Jason has grabbed Rick in one arm with his hand over Rick's mouth. As Chris returns inside Jason crushes Rick's skull with such force one of his eyes pops out of its socket.

=== Deputy Rick Cologne ===
- Portrayed by Vincent Guasteferro
- Appears in: Friday the 13th Part VI: Jason Lives
- Status: Alive

Rick Cologne serves as Sheriff Mike Garris's right-hand man, agreeing with Garris's disbelief that Jason returned. While Garris and the other officers investigate the camp, Rick guards Megan and Tommy, only to be locked in a jail cell when Megan steals Rick's gun. In some edits of the movie Rick can be seen trying to retrieve the cell keys with a towel only to lose his grip on it and then scream in frustration.

=== Rob Dier ===
- Portrayed by E. Erich Anderson
- Appears in: Friday the 13th: The Final Chapter
- Status: Deceased
- Died in: Friday the 13th: The Final Chapter

Rob Dier is the brother of Sandra Dier, who died in Friday the 13th Part 2. He is at Crystal Lake to hunt and kill Jason for murdering Sandra. He meets Trish Jarvis and her younger brother, Tommy Jarvis, whose car had stopped by the side of the road. Trish and Tommy bring Rob to their house where he meets their mother, Mrs. Jarvis. Later on, he reveals to Trish why he's at Crystal Lake, after they see some dead bodies. Rob tells her and Tommy about Jason Voorhees being responsible for killing his sister. They encounter Jason and Rob tries to fight off Jason so Trish and Tommy can get away and is killed in the process.

Rob's infamous "He's killing me" line is referenced in Friday the 13th: The Game.

=== Robin ===
- Portrayed by Juliette Cummins
- Appears in: Friday the 13th: A New Beginning
- Status: Deceased
- Died in: Friday the 13th: A New Beginning

Robin is one of three girls at the Pinehurst Halfway House when Tommy Jarvis is sent there to try an acclimate to society. She has a demure demeanour and an upbeat personality, and is close friends with fellow patient Violet. She does not spend much time socializing with the others, but has a genuine concern for other people. While watching A Place in the Sun with Reggie and Jake, Jake attempts to confess his feelings toward her, which makes her laugh suddenly and Jake storms off upset having his feelings hurt. Later, she puts a blanket on Reggie, who had fallen asleep and goes upstairs to bed. She regrets hurting Jake's feelings and turns over to go to sleep, only to discover Jake's body lying next to her. She screams and tries to get up, but a hand grabs her by the throat while a machete is stabbed through her bed and into her back.

Her body, along with Violet's and Jake's are discovered by Reggie a short time later.

=== Robin ===
- Portrayed by Elizabeth Kaitan
- Appears in: Friday the 13th Part VII: The New Blood
- Status: Deceased
- Died in: Friday the 13th Part VII: The New Blood

Robin first appears at the house scene where the party is taking place for Michael. She is shown to have a closer bond with Maddy than the others, as well as having a huge attraction towards David, as does Maddy. She is then shown throughout the movie spending most of her time with David, dancing, drinking, smoking, etc. Before long they wind up having sex, just as Jason cuts the power to the house and enters it. While David goes downstairs to get something to eat, Robin stays upstairs. After David does not return, she ventures out and starts looking, winding up in David's bedroom, where she finds a cat. Shortly after she discovers Eddie's severed head, then Jason enters the room, backing her into a corner. He grabs her around the neck then launches her out a window, sending her falling to her death.

=== Rowan LaFontaine ===
- Portrayed by Lexa Doig
- Appears in: Jason X
- Status: Alive

Rowan LaFontaine is the project leader of a group running experiments on Jason Voorhees, she leads several unsuccessful attempts to execute him, and is ultimately forced to cryogenically freeze Jason when he escapes confinement and kills the team meant to transport him to another facility. However, before the process is complete, Jason breaches the containment with his machete and stabs Rowan in the abdomen, critically wounding her just as cryonics fluid spills into the room and freezes her along with him. Unfrozen in the year 2455 aboard the spacecraft the Grendel, she is then forced to fight for her life when Jason awakens and starts killing everyone on the ship. At the conclusion of the film, she, a student named Tsunaron and the gynoid Kay-Em 14 he created are the only survivors of Jason's attack, picked up by a rescue vessel while Jason is sent hurtling through the atmosphere of Earth II when the Grendel explodes.

=== Roy Burns (Copycat killer) ===
- Portrayed by Dick Wieand
- Appears in: Friday the 13th: A New Beginning
- Status: Deceased
- Died in: Friday the 13th: A New Beginning

Roy Burns is a quiet loner paramedic who keeps to himself and the main antagonist of Friday the 13th: A New Beginning. Roy discovers that his son Joey (who he had presumably abandoned unbeknownst to anyone) has been murdered by a troubled, abusive teenager named "Vic Faden", a resident of the Pinehurst Halfway House. Enraged, Roy becomes unbalanced and decides to avenge Joey's death by murdering all those he deems responsible, similar to Pamela Voorhees. He uses Jason Voorhees's persona for this. As he goes on a massacre throughout Pinehurst and the surrounding area, Roy is eventually killed when Pam, Reggie, and Tommy cause him to fall and be impaled on a tractor harrow.

== S ==
=== Sandra Dier ===
- Portrayed by Marta Kober
- Appears in: Friday the 13th Part 2, Friday the 13th: The Final Chapter, Friday the 13th Part VII: The New Blood
- Status: Deceased
- Died in: Friday the 13th Part 2

Sandra Dier goes to Camp Crystal Lake in the summer of 1984 with her boyfriend Jeff and friend Ted who pranks them by getting their car towed. Later on, as Jeff plays video games with Mark, she tempts him into having sex, after having sex with Jeff, Sandra notices Jason Voorhees enter the room, wielding Ted's spear. Before she can warn Jeff, who is on top of her, Sandra is killed when Jason drives the spear through Jeff, her body, the bed and into the floor. After killing her, Jason hides Sandra's corpse in the bed he murdered her and Jeff in. Her nudity was edited out of Friday the 13th Part 2 when it was discovered she had lied about her age and was actually 16 years old at the time of filming.

In Friday the 13th Part VII: The New Blood, Sandra appears in archive footage.

In Friday the 13th: The Game, Sandra and Jeff's deaths appear as a loading screen.

=== Sandra ===
- Portrayed by Heidi Kozak
- Appears in: Friday the 13th Part VII: The New Blood
- Status: Deceased
- Died in: Friday the 13th Part VII: The New Blood

Sandra was the girlfriend of Russell Bowen, whose uncle owned the house that the birthday party was held in. She goes out for a walk early in the night with her boyfriend Russell and she goes skinny dipping in the lake. She tries to entice him into joining her and dives under water. Jason kills Russell by axing him in the face and when she resurfaces she sees his body and screams. Jason goes into the lake after her and pulls her under water, which drowns her.

=== Sara ===
- Portrayed by Barbara Howard
- Appears in: Friday the 13th: The Final Chapter
- Status: Deceased
- Died in: Friday the 13th: The Final Chapter

Sara goes to Camp Crystal with her friends in 1984. She is a reserved, traditional girl who has saved herself for the right man, she tells her boyfriend Doug she's ready to have sex with him. They make love in the shower. Soon after she leaves to blow dry her hair Jason proceeds to kill Doug by crushing his head against the shower wall and cannot hear him scream, later, she goes back to the bathroom and sees Doug dead and runs down stairs in a panic and is killed when Jason throws an axe at her through the door.

Her body is later spotted when Trish goes into the house with Rob.

=== Samantha ===
- Portrayed by Judie Aronson
- Appears in: Friday the 13th: The Final Chapter
- Status: Deceased
- Died in: Friday the 13th: The Final Chapter

Samantha "Sam" parties with her friends in 1984. As they party, she is angered when her boyfriend Paul dances with Tina—one of the twins they meet at Crystal Point. Enraged with Paul she runs to Crystal Point where she goes skinny dipping. While in the water, she climbs into a nearby raft and is stabbed through the raft.

Her body is later discovered by Paul, who is killed by Jason also.

=== Scott ===
- Portrayed by Russell Todd
- Appears in: Friday the 13th Part 2
- Status: Deceased
- Died in: Friday the 13th Part 2

Scott is a bit of a troublemaker and has an eye for Terry McCarthy. Whilst spying on her skinny-dipping he is caught in a rope trap and left hanging upside down. Terry is amused and threatens to leave him there. He begs her to cut him down and she relents and leaves to get a knife to cut him down. As Terry leaves Jason appears with a knife and Scott is helpless and sees his own throat slit.

Terry returns and finds Scott dead but as she flees she is killed by Jason too.

=== Sergeant Brodski ===
- Portrayed by Peter Mensah
- Appears in: Jason X
- Status: Deceased
- Died in: Jason X

Sergeant Brodski is a security contractor onboard the Grendel. He and his team are sent to dispatch Jason once his killing spree resumes. They disregard their orders to take the dangerous killer alive for monetary reasons, but Jason gets the better of them, wounding Brodski and killing the others. Despite his wounds, Brodski helps rig the ship to explode, and then uses an EVA suit to fix the docking door so that the survivors can evacuate. He sacrifices himself for the others by propelling both himself and the cyborg Jason into the atmosphere of Earth Two, and they burn up on entry.

=== Sean Robertson ===
- Portrayed by Scott Reeves
- Appears in: Friday the 13th Part VIII: Jason Takes Manhattan
- Status: Alive

Sean Robertson is the son of Admiral Robertson and is first seen arguing with his father about how to set sail. He is later revealed as a love interest of Rennie Wickham. When Rennie convinces Sean that Jason Voorhees is on board the ship they rush to the front of the ship only to find Admiral Robertson and his first mate dead. The male students arm themselves and hunt Jason but all fall prey to him, After the ship goes down Sean pilots the safety raft that takes him, Rennie, Charles McCulloch, Colleen Van Deuson, Julius Gaw and Toby the dog to New York. Two punks mug them and kidnap Rennie, Sean later finds her and they flee from Jason. As they head through the city sewers Sean is knocked out when Jason kills a sanitation worker. After Rennie douses Jason in toxic waste, she revives Sean and they escape as Jason seemingly dies. He and Rennie embrace on the street as they reunite with Toby and they start to walk along Times Square.

=== Shelly Finkelstein ===
- Portrayed by Larry Zerner
- Appears in: Friday the 13th Part III
- Status: Deceased
- Died in: Friday the 13th Part III

Sheldon "Shelly" Finkelstein (Note: Only known as Shelly in the film. Different expanded media gave him different surnames, "Greenblatt" and "Finkelstein" mainly.) is an overweight prankster with an afro. Shelly is self-conscious about his looks and pulls pranks on his friends. He is notable for being the owner of Jason's original hockey mask. Shelly tries an unsuccessful advance on Vera but is rejected. Angered by Vera spurning him, Shelly later sneaks up on her at the Crystal Lake dock, wielding a harpoon while wearing a wetsuit and hockey mask, intending to scare her. After being frightened by Shelly, an enraged Vera tells Shelly that she would like him more if he did not act like a "jerk," which Shelly responds to by saying that "being a jerk is better than being a nothing" before walking to a nearby barn where the hiding Jason Voorhees slits his throat off-screen and takes his hockey mask and harpoon. Shelly later tries to get help from friend Chili, but she thinks that he is pulling another trick, and eventually dies from his wound.

In the 2009 DVD/Blu-ray special features, and Friday the 13th: The Game his full name is "Sheldon Finkelstein".

=== Sheriff Mike Garris ===
- Portrayed by David Kagen
- Appears in: Friday the 13th Part VI: Jason Lives
- Status: Deceased
- Died in: Friday the 13th Part VI: Jason Lives

Sheriff Mike Garris is the law in Forest Green. We first see him when Tommy bursts through the door claiming Jason is alive. Garris dismisses Tommy's words of warning, saying he knows who he is and he'll escort him out of town; however, Tommy drives to the graveyard followed by Garris and his deputy, Rick. Tommy is apprehended and placed in the police station's jail cell. Garris's daughter Megan arrives in town with her friends to open the summer camp. He is annoyed when Megan and Tommy hit it off. Garris and his men find Cort and Nikki's bodies and he implicates Tommy in the murders believing him to be insane and imagining Jason. Megan helps Tommy escape the jail cell and they head to the camp, Garris and his men are on the way there too. Garris later finds his men dead and comes face to face with Jason. He puts him down with a shotgun shot and unloads bullets into Jason to no effect, Garris runs and hides in the bushes, he hears Megan shout for him and Jason turns to head towards her, Garris shouts "No not her!" and tackles Jason, picking up a rock and slamming it down on to the killer's mask, Jason, unfazed, folds Garris in half breaking his back and killing him.

=== Sissy Baker ===
- Portrayed by Renée Jones
- Appears in: Friday the 13th Part VI: Jason Lives
- Status: Deceased
- Died in: Friday the 13th Part VI: Jason Lives

Elizabeth "Sissy" Baker arrives with friends Megan Garris, Paula Mott and Cort Andrews to run a summer camp for young children. Later that night Sissy hears a noise outside of her window, believing it to be Cort playing a trick on her, she pours a beer out of the window. She is stunned by no response, then Jason grabs her and pulls her out the window and twists her head ripping it off of her body.

Sissy's severed head is later found by Megan in Sheriff Garris's car.

=== Stephanie Kimble ===
- Portrayed by Brooke Scher
- Appears in: Jason Goes to Hell: The Final Friday
- Status: Alive

Stephanie Kimble is the daughter of Jessica Kimble and Steven Freeman, and the great-niece of Jason Voorhees. In Jason Goes to Hell, she is a baby and Jason tries to use her to be reborn in another body, but is stopped and sent to Hell by Jessica and Steven.

=== Steve Christy ===
- Portrayed by Peter Brouwer (1980) and Dan Thompson (2026)
- Appears in: Friday the 13th (1980) and Crystal Lake (2026)
- Status: Deceased
- Died in: Friday the 13th (1980)

Steve Christy is a man from a rich family, who tries to rebuild Camp Crystal Lake or "Camp Blood" as the locals have coined it. He is old fashioned and has an attraction toward Alice Hardy, who works with him in rebuilding the camp. He leaves Crystal Lake to go to town for supplies and stops at a diner, leaving late after a heavy storm comes into the area. He drives a Jeep Wrangler much like the one that the movie's killer had been seen in, leading the audience into believing he was the one responsible for killing his counselors. His car breaks down and he has a deputy give him a lift to Crystal Lake, but he is dropped off when an emergency is called over the radio and Steve makes his way back on foot. Approaching the sign for Crystal Lake, he encounters someone holding a flash light whom he recognizes and as he approaches, he is suddenly stabbed in the abdomen and dies.

Later, his body is discovered by Alice when it falls from a tree she is running past, a knife plunged deep into his chest.

=== Steven Halavex ===
- Portrayed by Roger Rose
- Appears in: Friday the 13th Part VI: Jason Lives
- Status: Deceased
- Died in: Friday the 13th Part VI: Jason Lives

Steven Halavex and his girlfriend Annette are in the woods having a moonlight picnic when they hear a scream. Steven goes to investigate and sees Jason standing over gravedigger Martin's body. He rushes back to Annette and they get on his motorbike with the intention to go to the police; however, before they can leave Jason impales them both with his machete.

=== Steven Freeman ===
- Portrayed by John D. LeMay
- Appears in: Jason Goes to Hell: The Final Friday
- Status: Alive

Steven Freeman is Jessica Kimble’s ex-boyfriend and father of her baby Stephanie, whom he has no contact with. Adam Marcus, director of the film, had originally intended for the character to be Tommy Jarvis, but New Line Cinema at that time lacked the legal rights to Tommy's character after buying the franchise from Paramount Pictures and the creative team had to write a new character and name for the film instead. When Jessica's mother Diana is murdered by Jason Voorhees, Steven is blamed. In jail, he learns from bounty hunter Creighton Duke that Jason is attempting to be reborn through another Voorhees, and that Jessica and Stephanie are his only surviving blood relatives. Steven escapes from jail and tries to warn Jessica of the danger she and their daughter are in, but she does not believe his story. When Jason attacks Jessica in the body of her current boyfriend Robert Campbell, Steven guns him down and saves her. Steven and Jessica eventually travel to the Voorhees house to retrieve their baby from Duke, who reveals that Jessica is the only one capable of killing Jason permanently. When Jason is finally reborn through Diana's corpse, he and Steven engage in a fist fight until Jessica uses a mystical dagger to send Jason to Hell. Steven is almost dragged into Hell as well, but Jessica rescues him and the couple reconcile, walking off into the sunrise with their baby.

The book Making Friday the 13th: The Legend of Camp Blood describes Steven as "a deadbeat who refuses to grow up and take responsibility for his actions, but who, nonetheless, eventually summons the courage to fight Jason". Horror website Slasherama labels him "plucky, if rather geeky" and "one of the more quirky Friday heroes". The role was initially offered to Blair Underwood but he refused it for "personal reasons"; Making Friday the 13th asks whether having a "strong African-American presence" may have been beneficial for the series, but concludes that it is a moot point since Jason is "an equal opportunity killing machine". The part of Steven eventually went to John D. LeMay, who had previously appeared as lead character Ryan Dallion in Friday the 13th: The Series. LeMay was hesitant about returning to the Friday franchise, having left the television series to avoid being typecast. He states "It's hard to say, looking back, if it was a good move or a bad move, career-wise"; he ultimately accepted the role because "it was a lead role and I liked the character and, with New Line involved, it seemed like the series was going in a whole other direction." However, he also admits "I was broke at the time so it was a beautiful lifesaver. I needed it to pay the rent!" Nevertheless, he says "I had a blast making Jason Goes to Hell. You had to have a sense of humour while fighting Jason at three in the morning, trying to find ways to hit him with a shovel and stuff like that [laughs]. As if that would do any good!".

=== Suzi Donaldson ===
- Portrayed by Tiffany Paulsen
- Appears in: Friday the 13th Part VIII: Jason Takes Manhattan
- Status: Deceased
- Died in: Friday the 13th Part VIII: Jason Takes Manhattan

Suzi Donaldson learns of Jason Voorhees and how he drowned in Camp Crystal Lake in 1957, while on her boyfriend Jim’s boat. After hearing the story she is terrified, and has sex with Jim. Jason walks in the room wielding a new hockey mask and a harpoon, which Jim previously used to scare Suzie. She screams and jumps out the window while Jim gets disemboweled by Jason. She hides in a storage room on the boat, but Jason finds her, stabbing her with the arrow from the harpoon as she screams hysterically and pleads for her life. He then closes the hatch to the storage room.

== T ==
=== Tamara Mason ===
- Portrayed by Sharlene Martin
- Appears in: Friday the 13th Part VIII: Jason Takes Manhattan
- Status: Deceased
- Died in: Friday the 13th Part VIII: Jason Takes Manhattan

Tamara Mason is a prom queen and popular girl, Tamara often hangs out with her best friend Eva Wantabe. She rejects the advances of Wayne Webber who has a crush on her and prefers more mature men. She is a delinquent as well, earning the ire of chaperone Charles McCulloch who threatens that she will not be able to visit New York City if she does not provide him a passable biology report. After his niece Rennie catches Tamara and Eva doing drugs, they are nearly caught by McCulloch moments later. Believing that Rennie ratted on them, she plays a prank and knocks her overboard. Later, using Wayne and his camera, she uses her biology report as a sexual advance toward McCulloch, recording him in a compromising position. She spurns Wayne and lets him out of her cabin before going to take a shower, when she emerges she discovers Jason has entered her cabin and tries to hide quietly in the bathroom. Jason punches through her bathroom door, grabs her by the hair and hurls her into her mirror. She collapses and sobs as Jason smashes her mirror, begging for her life. Jason grabs a large shard of the mirror and kills her with it.

After an emergency is called on the ship, Eva goes to find Tamara and finds her body still in her cabin's bathroom.

=== Ted Bowen ===
- Portrayed by Stuart Charno
- Appears in: Friday the 13th Part 2
- Status: Alive

Theodore "Ted" Bowen is good friends with counselors-in-training Jeff Dunsberry and Sandra Dier, showing it after playing a prank on them in which he has their car towed a couple of blocks. He is also the second-in-charge of the team; a practical joker, he aids Paul in telling a story of Jason Voorhees by scaring the other counselors wielding a spear and a mask. His spear is later used by Jason ironically to kill Jeff and Sandra. When he leaves with Ginny, Paul and most of the others from the cabin, he drinks heavily but promises to have someone else drive back to the camp. Ted is one of the only main counselors in the entire series to not be killed by Jason as he is never seen again when Paul and Ginny leave him at the bar.

Reports were rife that in the original script Ted returned to the camp only to be killed by Jason but this idea was dropped due to time constraints, making him one of the only Friday the 13th characters to not encounter Jason and to not be killed by him.

=== Ted ===
- Portrayed by Lawrence Monoson
- Appears in: Friday the 13th: The Final Chapter
- Status: Deceased
- Died in: Friday the 13th: The Final Chapter

Ted is a know-it-all who is always on his best friend Jimmy "Jimbo" for his sexual failures and inserting the information into an imaginary "computer" concludes that Jimbo is a "dead fuck". He is easily turned on by girls and fawns after Tina and Terri as soon as they meet. He is also not bashful about skinny dipping and also uses a teddy bear as a come on. First to Tina, then to Terri at a party he asks them if they "Want to give the "teddy bear" a kiss. After he is spurned by both girls, he turns to smoking pot and watching vintage stag films. After the reel is cut, he stands in front of the white screen looking for Jimmy and is suddenly stabbed in the back of the head through the screen.

=== Terry ===
- Portrayed by Kirsten Baker
- Appears in: Friday the 13th Part 2, Friday the 13th Part III, Friday the 13th: The Final Chapter
- Status: Deceased
- Died in: Friday the 13th Part 2

Terry is one of the counselor trainees, bringing her pet dog Muffin to the camp. Muffin later goes missing and Terry remains at the camp in case Muffin returns. While skinny dipping, Scott steals her clothes and runs off. However, Scott is caught with a snare that leaves him hanging in the air, and Terry takes her clothes back before going to get a knife to cut him down. When she returns, Scott has been killed by Jason, who then proceeds to kill Terry and place her corpse in his shrine to Pamela at his shed.

Terry's corpse appears in a flashback in Friday the 13th Part III and appears in archive footage in Friday the 13th: The Final Chapter.

=== Tina & Terri ===
- Portrayed by Camilla More and Carey More (respectively)
- Appears in: Friday the 13th Part 2, Friday the 13th Part III, Friday the 13th: The Final Chapter
- Status: Both deceased
- Died in: Friday the 13th: The Final Chapter

Tina & Terri are two twins, who live locally in Crystal Lake where they meet six teens who have rented a cabin for the weekend. They spend the day skinny dipping with their new friends and at a party that night, Terri decides to leave the more promiscuous Tina and return home alone. She is impaled through the back by Jason and killed before she can gather her bike and leave.

After Tina and Jimmy have sex, Jimmy goes downstairs and is murdered. While waiting for him to return, Tina notices Terri's bicycle out in the rain before Jason suddenly bursts through the window and hurls her from the second floor. She falls onto the teens' parked car below and hits it with enough force to blow out all the windows in the vehicle and falls into the darkness. Her body is later discovered by Trish.

=== Tina ===
- Portrayed by Debi Sue Voorhees
- Appears in: Friday the 13th: A New Beginning
- Status: Deceased
- Died in: Friday the 13th: A New Beginning

Tina is a promiscuous teenager who is always with her boyfriend Eddie, often getting in trouble with the police and having to be returned to Pinehurst Halfway House. Tina and Eddie sneak into the woods. They have sex and after Eddie goes to freshen up Tina lies on the blanket, opening her eyes she screams as Roy Burns masquerading as Jason Voorhees kills her by stabbing her through the eyes with garden shears. Eddie discovers her body and is then murdered himself.

=== Tina Shepard ===
- Portrayed by Lar Park Lincoln and Jennifer Banko (child)
- Appears in: Friday the 13th Part VII: The New Blood
- Status: Alive

Tina Shepard is a character who possesses telekinetic/psychokinetic powers, Tina accidentally killed her abusive father as a child when she destroyed the pier he was standing on, causing him to drown in Crystal Lake. As a teenager, Tina is being treated by psychiatrist Dr. Crews, who secretly plans to exploit her psychic powers for his own personal gain. Returning to Crystal Lake to deal with the trauma, Tina attempts to resurrect her father with her powers, but instead succeeds in releasing Jason from his watery prison. As Jason wanders the forest killing anybody in his way, Tina experiences psychic visions of the people he kills. When Jason murders Tina's mother, her doctor, and friends, she is forced to use her powers to defend herself and fellow survivor Nick. Tina eventually summons a manifestation of her father to drag Jason back underwater.

A New Blood was initially conceived as Freddy vs. Jason; when studios failed to agree over rights to the respective franchises, the concept became Jason vs. Carrie instead, with Tina created to fill in for Stephen King's telekinetic character Carrie White. Screenwriter Daryl Haney believed giving the character telekinetic abilities would add a new twist to the commonly seen final girl in the films. Director John Carl Buechler sees similarities between Tina and Alice Johnson, the protagonist of A Nightmare on Elm Street 4: The Dream Master. He says, "Both films are about heroines who take on special powers which they use to fight the monster. In The New Blood, Tina's able to fully harness her telekinetic powers by the end of the film and she uses the powers to defeat Jason which is what happened, more or less, in The Dream Master." Buechler was disappointed that the film did not explore Tina's powers more, "I wanted to really get into the clairvoyant stuff and have Tina experience all of these surreal nightmares because I'd really done a lot of homework about the paranormal and the way that clairvoyants use their powers. The producers did not like the idea." One of Beuchler's plans involved Tina seeing her mother holding Pamela Voorhees's head, which would have cried, "Help me, help me." The idea was vetoed by Barbara Sachs for being too "out there". Composer Fred Mollin came up with theme music for Tina "because she was a psychic and I felt like she'd project a certain aura since there had never been character like her before in a Friday the 13th film. When developing the comic miniseries, The Nightmare Warriors, the creators felt that Neil Gordon from A Nightmare on Elm Street 3: Dream Warriors would be a natural replacement for Dr. Crews as Tina's doctor.

Actress Lar Park Lincoln was intrigued by the role of Tina and her telekinetic powers, saying, "It was a complex story and it would allow me to play something other than a drug addict or a prostitute. So I said sure." Lincoln was already a Friday the 13th fan, and was proud to have seen every one of the films. She claimed, "I don't think anybody really set out to change the world with these movies. Nobody will ever be accused of trying to make a social statement or great art. What these films are is entertainment." Serious about doing the movie justice, Lincoln took it upon herself to study with real life psychics. She explains, "I knew how important Tina's telekinetic powers were to the character so I went out and met with real psychics and learned about psychic visions and the way that psychics can relate their visions because it's one thing to have a vision and another to be able to explain it." Lincoln admits she does not know how genuine the psychics she met were, but claims it was an interesting experience. Another area of Tina's characterization the actress took interest in was her guilt over her father's death; "It gets worse by the end of the story because so many people die, including her mother, and it's really her fault because she brought Jason back."

=== Tommy Jarvis ===
- Portrayed by Corey Feldman (The Final Chapter, A New Beginning; young), John Shepherd (A New Beginning), Thom Mathews (Part VI)
- Appears in: Friday the 13th: The Final Chapter, Friday the 13th: A New Beginning, Friday the 13th Part VI: Jason Lives, Friday the 13th Part VII: The New Blood
- Status: Alive

Thomas "Tommy" Jarvis is one of the series' most frequently recurring characters, and is Jason's nemesis. He made his first appearance in Friday the 13th: The Final Chapter as a young boy with an affinity for making his own masks and make-up effects. When Jason arrives at the Jarvis cabin, Tommy is forced to fight for his life along with his sister Trish. To trick Jason, Tommy shaves his head to make himself appear as Jason did when he was young. As Jason is distracted by his appearance, Jarvis attacks with a machete, leaving him apparently dead. While embracing Trish, Tommy notices Jason beginning to stir and proceeds to go into a maniacal state, brutally attacking Jason with his machete and ignoring Trish's protests for him to stop. The film ends with Tommy visiting Trish at a hospital an unspecified time later. While hugging her, he stares emotionlessly at the camera. Tommy returns in Friday the 13th: A New Beginning as a teenager/adult, now living in a halfway house, having spent the last five years in a mental institution. When Roy Burns begins committing murders in the style of Jason Voorhees, Tommy's sanity begins to slip away again and he starts suffering hallucinations and nightmares of Jason. Tommy is later forced to kill Burns in self-defense, and this seems to push him over the edge; the final scene of the film has a hockey-masked Tommy preparing to stab the halfway house's assistant director, Pam. Original Tommy actor Corey Feldman reprised the role for a cameo appearance in a dream sequence at the beginning of the film.

In Friday the 13th Part VI: Jason Lives, a more stable Tommy decides to confront his demons by cremating Jason's body. Digging up Jason's body with his friend Allen Hawes, Tommy's memories of his encounter with Jason rise to the surface, and he ends up repeatedly impaling Jason's corpse with a piece of cemetery fence. Unfortunately, this attracts a bolt of lightning, which both resurrects Jason and grants him numerous superhuman abilities. After Jason kills Hawes, Tommy drives off. Trying to make amends for his mistake, Tommy warns Sheriff Garris that Jason has returned to Crystal Lake (renamed "Forest Green"), but the sheriff assumes he has had another psychotic break and ignores him; the pile of bodies Jason racks up only convinces the sheriff that the killer is in fact Tommy. Tommy eventually teams up with Garris's daughter Megan, a counselor at Camp Forest Green, to defeat Jason himself. Researching occult books, he decides to return Jason to the lake where he originally drowned as a child. Tommy succeeds in chaining Jason to the bottom of the lake, but almost drowns in the process. After regaining consciousness thanks to Megan swimming him ashore and performing CPR on him, Tommy grimly notes that it is finally over, and Jason is at last home.

In the mockumentary "The Crystal Lake Massacres Revisited" from the 2009 DVD extra, it is mentioned that Tommy was thought to be the killer in Friday the 13th Part VI: Jason Lives by the local town folk. It also talks about Tommy's stay at the state mental hospital, and how due to overcrowding was sent to Pinehurst. It was Joseph Zito's original intention to have Tommy become the antagonist and "new Jason" in any subsequent Friday the 13th films created after the fourth. The ending of Friday the 13th: A New Beginning leads up to this, although due to the negative reaction to that film, the idea was dropped. The producers of the 2009 Friday the 13th reboot considered using the Tommy character, but decided not to because they wanted to create their own mythology.

Mezco Toyz has released a statuette of both Tommy and Jason, depicting the scene of them fighting underwater from Friday the 13th Part VI: Jason Lives.

=== Trish Jarvis ===
- Portrayed by Kimberly Beck
- Appears in: Friday the 13th: The Final Chapter, Friday the 13th: A New Beginning, Friday the 13th Part VI: Jason Lives, Friday the 13th Part VII: The New Blood
- Status: Alive

Patricia "Trish" Jarvis is a local of the Crystal Lake area, who lives with her mother and younger brother, Tommy. Trish and Tommy meet a man named Rob Dier in the woods, who claims to be hunting bears but is actually searching for Jason Voorhees, the man who killed his sister, Sandra (a character in Friday the 13th Part 2). Trish and Rob discover that Jason has murdered a group of teenagers vacationing next to the Jarvis house. When Rob and her mother are killed, Trish is forced to protect herself and her brother from Jason, fighting him off with a machete while Tommy distracts him. She is last seen being visited in the hospital by Tommy after he kills Jason.

Trish can be seen briefly in Friday the 13th: A New Beginning along with her mother in a photo belonging to Tommy. In the mockumentary called "The Crystal Lake Massacres Revisited", (included in the extras of the 2009 DVDs) it is mentioned that Trish was the one who had Tommy institutionalized after he was having difficulty adjusting to life after Jason killed their mother. Trish did not want to have Tommy committed, but in the end agreed it might help him. She also visited Tommy during his six-year stay, but the visits were lessened due to lack of progress.

=== Trent ===
- Portrayed by Travis Van Winkle
- Appears in: Friday the 13th (2009)
- Status: Deceased
- Died in: Friday the 13th (2009)

Trent is killed when Jason stabs him in the heart with his machete.

Van Winkle played a similarly-dispositioned character also named Trent in the live-action Transformers film (2007), also produced by Michael Bay, causing some to speculate that he is the same character.

== V ==
=== Vera Sanchez ===
- Portrayed by Catherine Parks
- Appears in: Friday the 13th Part III, Friday the 13th: The Final Chapter
- Status: Deceased
- Died in: Friday the 13th Part III

Vera Sanchez is invited by Andy to be his friend Shelly's blind date for a weekend stay at Higgins Haven, but was put off by Shelly's odd appearance and behavior. Vera began to warm up to him after an encounter with members of a biker gang, led by Ali. Vera had told Shelly the reason she was not attracted to him was because of his behavior. After he leaves, she gets up and drops his wallet in Crystal Lake and goes to retrieve it. She then spots Jason, but believes it to be Shelly until the killer shoots her in the eye and through her head with a speargun.

=== Vic Faden ===
- Portrayed by Mark Venturini
- Appears in: Friday the 13th: A New Beginning
- Status: Alive (Possibly incarcerated)

Victor J. "Vic" Faden is a disturbed young man and a resident of Pinehurst Halfway House. One day he is chopping wood with an axe when fellow resident Joey approaches him, offering him some chocolate. Vic tells Joey he hates being in Pinehurst and demands Joey to go away but Joey puts it on a piece of wood. Vic chops the chocolate up, angering Joey who tells him that he's out of line. This makes Vic snap and swing the axe into Joey's back, killing him in front of all the residents and Dr. Matthew Letter.

Vic is last seen in the back of a police car, showing no remorse nor regret for killing Joey. He is never seen again, presumably getting a life sentence in prison for murder.

=== Vicki ===
- Portrayed by Allison Smith
- Appears in: Jason Goes to Hell: The Final Friday
- Status: Deceased
- Died in: Jason Goes to Hell: The Final Friday

Vicki is a waitress at Joey B.'s diner, Vicki was a friend of Randy, Jessica, and Steven. Vicki was often critical of Joey's actions, such as the "Jason is dead" burger and only closing the diner until noon to honor the death of fellow waitress Diana. Vicki was the one to tell Jessica that Steven was the one suspected of murdering Diana. When a Jason-possessed Robert attacked the diner, Vicki attempted to kill Jason with a double-barreled shotgun. Jason impaled Vicki on an iron rod, before crushing her head.

=== Vickie ===
- Portrayed by Lauren-Marie Taylor
- Appears in: Friday the 13th Part 2, Friday the 13th Part VII: The New Blood
- Status: Deceased
- Died in: Friday the 13th Part 2

Vickie is attracted to Mark and goes all out to let him know she likes him. They talk and kiss and Vickie goes to freshen up, as she does Mark is killed by Jason. Upon returning and being unable to find Mark Vickie goes upstairs to find her friends Sandra and Jeff dead, Jason cuts her knee and then advances on her killing her with a kitchen knife.

=== Vinnie Manalo ===
- Portrayed by Anthony Barrile
- Appears in: Friday the 13th: A New Beginning
- Status: Deceased
- Died in: Friday the 13th: A New Beginning

Vincent "Vinnie" Manalo is stranded with his friend Pete Linley after their car breaks down in the middle of the woods. Knowledgeable of cars, Vinnie is elected by Pete to fix the car while Pete goes off to use the bathroom. While Pete's gone, someone lights a road flare, startling Vinnie who mistakes it for Pete. As he approaches, the killer shoves the road flare in Vinnie's mouth, killing him.

Pete sees Vinnie propped up against the car and assumes he is still alive, threatening that he's a "dead man" if he hasn't gotten the car started yet. Moments later, Pete is killed too.

=== Violet Moraine ===
- Portrayed by Tiffany Helm
- Appears in: Friday the 13th: A New Beginning
- Status: Deceased
- Died in: Friday the 13th: A New Beginning

Violet Moraine is portrayed as a punk/goth girl who was independent and occasionally absent minded, by accidentally setting plates for people no longer at the Pinehurst halfway house and often listened to loud music. She spurns Jake who wants to talk to her about his attraction to Robyn and is unbeknownst killed immediately after she dismisses him. Later Roy, a killer under the guise of Jason sneaks up to her as she is dancing to His Eyes by Pseudo Echo when she is grabbed by the neck and lifted up into the air before being stabbed in the stomach and be killed.

Her body is later discovered by Reggie who goes searching for Tommy at the house.

== W ==
=== Wayne Webber ===
- Portrayed by Martin Cummins
- Appears in: Friday the 13th Part VIII: Jason Takes Manhattan
- Status: Deceased
- Died in: Friday the 13th Part VIII: Jason Takes Manhattan

Wayne Webber is a young man on the SS Lazarus cruise ship bound for New York City with his graduating class. Wayne is close friends with fellow student J.J. He has large glasses and shoulder-length hair and is an aspiring film maker. He rejects helping J.J. with her guitar audio test in the bowels of the ship in an attempt to impress his crush Tamara. He helps her bribe Principal McCulluch so she can secure a high grade by videotaping him with her in a compromising position. When Admiral Robertson and the first mate are found dead in the ship's cabin Wayne joins the hunt for Jason with the other male students. He accidentally kills another student when he loses his glasses and fires a shotgun at someone he cannot see. He uses his video camera to accommodate for his poor eyesight and encounters Jason who knocks the video camera out of his hand and chases him. During the chase Wayne falls over a body, he realises it is J.J.'s corpse just as Jason grabs him and hurls him into an electrical box, killing him. His body catches fire and sets the events in motion that cause the SS Lazarus to sink.

=== Whitney Miller ===
- Portrayed by Amanda Righetti
- Appears in: Friday the 13th (2009)
- Status: Deceased
- Died in: Friday the 13th (2009)

Whitney Miller is looking after her mother full-time as she is dying. She is convinced by her boyfriend Mike to take a vacation to Crystal Lake, but while there, they are attacked by Jason Voorhees. Jason kills Mike and the rest of the group, but leaves Whitney unharmed and abducts her as she resembles his mother at a young age. Six weeks later, Whitney's brother Clay explores Crystal Lake looking for his sister, concerned by her failure to attend their mother's funeral. He eventually finds and rescues her from Jason's tunnels. Whitney later uses her resemblance to Mrs. Voorhees to her advantage by distracting Jason long enough to stab him with his own machete. She and Clay then dump Jason's body in the lake, but he rises and grabs Whitney.

In February 2026, when asked about the cancelled sequel, writers Mark Swift and Damian Shannon confirmed that Whitney was killed by Jason and her body would've been seen in the frozen Crystal Lake during the opening sequence.

=== Deputy Winslow ===
- Portrayed by Jack Marks
- Appears in: Friday the 13th Part 2
- Status: Deceased
- Died in: Friday the 13th Part 2

Deputy Winslow was a local police officer. He tells Ginny and Paul that any trouble will result in closure of the counselor program. On his way out of the camp he sees a figure run out in front of him. When he stops his car and investigates further, he finds a shack and is shocked at what is inside, but before he can do anything, he is killed by a hammer to the back of the head.

== See also ==
- List of Friday the 13th media
- List of A Nightmare on Elm Street characters
- List of Evil Dead characters
- List of The Texas Chainsaw Massacre characters
