= Bob DeSimone =

American actor

- Born: April 15, 1946 (age 79); Boston, Massachusetts, United States

Bob DeSimone (born April 15, 1946) is an American actor who has starred in several movies. He is perhaps best known for his role as Billy, the cocaine-snorting mental health worker, in the 1985 horror movie Friday the 13th: A New Beginning. His other films were Savage Streets (1984), and Angel III: The Final Chapter. DeSimone also appeared on the hit comedy show, Make Me Laugh and was a headliner at The Comedy Store and Improv during their heyday, working with Jay Leno, David Letterman, Richard Pryor and Jerry Seinfeld.

Before DeSimone turned to comedy and acting, he was, (and still is) an accomplished drummer. Almost immediately after arriving in California, he was in demand. The early 1970s found DeSimone playing with many top bands in and out of the studios. He was a fixture at the Ash Grove club in West Hollywood, noted for promoting up and coming blues and folk musicians. Teaming up with Bernie Pearl, they both backed Lightnin' Hopkins, Big Mama Thornton, The Bernie Pearl Band, Dr. John, Albert King, Luke "Long Gone" Miles, Taj Mahal and Chuck Berry.

From there he signed on with Atlantic Records after creating a country rock band named, "Country". Signed by Peter Asher, they opened for America, Fleetwood Mac, Linda Ronstadt, and the Bee Gees. The band also featured Tom Snow.

DeSimone left acting in 1983 and began his own successful business. He still plays drums and is currently working with local R&B, blues and rock bands in Southern California.

He married his girlfriend, Lisa Stern in 1994, and together they have two children.

== Filmography ==
- Chatterbox (1977) - Cab Driver
- The Seduction (1982) - Photographer
- The Concrete Jungle (1982) - Parelli's Assistant
- Savage Streets (1984) - Mr. Meeker
- Friday the 13th: A New Beginning (1985) - Billy
- Angel III: The Final Chapter (1988) - Porn Director
- His Name Was Jason: 30 Years of Friday the 13th (2009) - Himself (Documentary film)
- Crystal Lake Memories: The Complete History of Friday the 13th (2013) - Himself (Documentary film)
