= Shavar Ross =

American actor and filmmaker

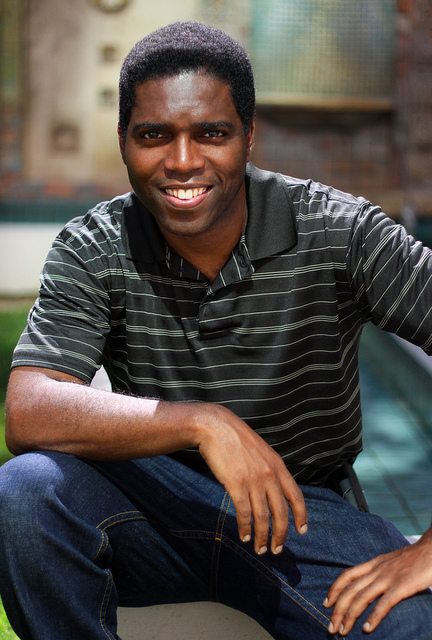
- Shavar Ross in 2011
- Born: Bronx, New York, U.S.
- Education: Pasadena City College (AA)
- Occupations: Actor; film director; Entrepreneur; Spiritual Mentor/Teacher
- Years active: 1980–present

Shavar Ross is an American actor, film director, screenwriter, film producer, editor, photographer, author, online retail entrepreneur, and spiritual mentor and teacher. He is known for his recurring television role as Dudley Johnson, Arnold Jackson's (Gary Coleman's) best friend in the NBC sitcom Diff'rent Strokes, Alex "Weasel" Parks in the ABC sitcom Family Matters, and as "Reggie the Reckless" in the fifth installment of the Friday the 13th movie series Friday the 13th: A New Beginning.

== Early life ==
Ross was born in the South Bronx, New York. His parents separated when he was seven years old. His mother took Shavar and his sister to Macon, Georgia, while his father went to Los Angeles to pursue an acting career.

== Career ==
While visiting his father in California during his school's Christmas vacation, Shavar was discovered by top children's agent Evelyn Shultz.

Ross landed his first recurring television role on NBC's Diff'rent Strokes as Dudley Johnson, the best friend of Gary Coleman's character Arnold Jackson. Shavar appeared in the TV film Scout's Honor, also with Gary Coleman.

Ross became a voice actor for Hanna-Barbera and voiced Our Gang kid Billie "Buckwheat" Thomas from the animated TV series version of The Little Rascals. He also appeared in season 2 of the television show Benson, episode 11 "Big Buddy" and episode 17 "Easy Kid Stuff".

Ross also had a recurring role on the series Family Matters as Alex "Weasel" Parks.

Ross has appeared in over 100 film and episodic television projects throughout his career, including such films as the fifth installment of the Friday the 13th movie series Friday the 13th: A New Beginning as Reggie "Reggie the Reckless" Winter and as Bryant Calvin, T.C.'s (Roger E. Mosley) son in the television series Magnum, P.I.

After completing four years of Bible School at The Ministry Training Institute, an auxiliary of Crenshaw Christian Center, Ross founded The Alive Church, a non-denominational Christian church in Los Angeles, and was its pastor for four years.

Shavar is founder and CEO of Tri-Seven Entertainment, Inc., a film, television and online retail company which produces, develops, acquires and distributes inspirational products for a global audience. As a director, his first short film, Soul to Take (2003), garnered him an Internet distribution deal with Russell Simmons' media company Simmons/Lathan Media Group. His second short film, A Taste of Us (2004), dealt with the civil unrest of the 1960s segregation in the south and was originally made as a pilot presentation for the TV One Network. Lord Help Us (released nationally in May 2007 through Image Entertainment), an inspirational urban romantic comedy starring American Idol‘s Nadia Turner, Oscar nominee Margaret Avery (The Color Purple), Debra Wilson (MADtv, Scary Movie 4), comedian Joe Clair (BET's Rap City, Take the Cake), Grammy-Award winning singer Al Jarreau and many others marked his feature film directorial debut.

In May 2006, Ross appeared on an E! Child Stars Special, Geeks, Freaks, and Sidekicks, where he revealed that during the taping of the very special episode of Diff'rent Strokes in which he was molested, he was going through a similar experience in real life; he was being "touched" by a family friend inappropriately while he was asleep.

In 2008, he played a "prosperity preacher" on David Alan Grier's show Chocolate News on Comedy Central. In 2009, he appeared in a documentary film His Name Was Jason: 30 Years of Friday the 13th and in 2013 in a documentary film Crystal Lake Memories: The Complete History of Friday the 13th.
