= Vernon Washington =

American actor (1923–1988)

- Born: Samuel Vernon Washington; August 10, 1923; Hartford, Connecticut, U.S.
- Died: June 7, 1988 (aged 64); Los Angeles, California, U.S.
- Occupation: Actor
- Years active: 1974–1987
- Spouse: Marion Blunt
- Children: 4

Samuel Vernon Washington (August 10, 1923 – June 7, 1988) was an American actor who starred in film and television.

== Biography ==
Vernon Washington was born and raised in Hartford, Connecticut, the 8th child of Benjamin and Olive Evans of Dinwiddie County, Virginia and Frederick, Maryland, respectively. He was 5 feet 11 inches tall and father of 4 children with his wife, Marion Blunt. Washington was educated at the Wolter School of Speech and Drama, Carnegie Hall, New York City, where he studied Speech under Madame Annette Wolter and Dr. Walter O. Robinson; and Drama under Rossi, Mary Higgins and Gus Lambluise.

Washington is best known for his roles in the 1984 science fiction movie The Last Starfighter as Otis and in the 1985 horror movie Friday the 13th: A New Beginning as George Winter and television roles in the 1979 miniseries Roots: The Next Generations as Rev. Mills. Vernon had a recurring role on the CBS hit series The Jeffersons as Leroy. Later he appeared in an episode of the hit CBS series, Falcon Crest as Teddy Eubanks, a horse groomer.

Washington's special abilities and training include writer, director and producer. He has been awarded the Stars & Stripes Award for Ready, Front, at Ease, a lighthearted Army musical. He was the founder, producer and director of West End Repertory Theatre in New York City. He has served as artistic director of Greensburgh, Newark and Staten Island Theatre Arts Workshops; and assistant professor of drama, Staten Island Community College, New York City.

== Filmography ==
- Change at 125th Street (1974, TV Movie) as Herbert
- Uncle Joe Shannon (1978) as Old Timer
- Roots: The Next Generations (1979, TV Mini-Series) as Rev. Mills
- The Dark (1979) as Henry Lydell
- Pray TV (1981, TV Movie) as Jimmy
- Falcon Crest (1983, Episode: "Solitary Confinements") as Teddy Eubanks
- The Last Starfighter (1984) as Otis
- Joan Rivers and Friends Salute Heidi Abromowitz (1988, TV Special) as himself
- Friday the 13th: A New Beginning (1985) as George Winter
- Dream West (1986, TV Mini-Series) as Dodson
- The Jeffersons (1977–79) as Leroy (6 episodes)
