= Melanie Kinnaman =

American dancer, film and stage actress)

- Born: Holyoke, Massachusetts, U.S.
- Occupation: Actress

Melanie Kinnaman is an American film and stage actress. She is known for her role as Pam Roberts in the 1985 horror film Friday the 13th: A New Beginning. She later co-starred with Eric Roberts in the 1989 film Best of the Best. Kinnaman has made guest appearances on television in programs such as Hill Street Blues, The People Next Door and Cheers. She is continuing acting and working on projects for stage, television and film.

== Biography ==
Kinnaman was born and raised in Holyoke, Massachusetts, where she attended Holyoke High School, and later, the Williston Northampton School in Easthampton. Kinnman is of German and Czech descent.

After graduating from high school, Kinnaman relocated to New York City where she appeared in several Off-Broadway productions, attempted to obtain roles in soap operas as well as appearing in commercials. She relocated to Los Angeles in 1982, and eight months later appeared in a thirteen-week run of General Hospital.

In 1984, Kinnaman was cast as a drug-addicted prostitute in Cannon Films's Thunder Alley (1985). She was subsequently cast as the lead heroine, Pam Roberts, in Friday the 13th: A New Beginning. She was originally going to reprise her role as Pam (who evidently survived in the previous film) in Friday the 13th Part VI: Jason Lives, but Paramount Pictures changed the concept of the sequel and the character was written out.

== Filmography ==
Film and television roles
Year	Title	Role	Notes
1978	Saturday Night Live	Cheryl Ladd	Episode: "The Rolling Stones" (uncredited)
1981–1982	General Hospital	Maria	7 episodes
1982	Hill Street Blues	Tanya	Episode: "Stan the Man"
1985	Friday the 13th: A New Beginning	Pam Roberts	Film
1985	Thunder Alley	Star	Film
1989	The People Next Door	Bridesmaid	Episode: "I Do, I Do"
1989	Best of the Best	Woman	Film
1989	Cheers	Tanya	Episode: "For Real Men Only"
2022	The Once and Future Smash	Herself	Film
2025	Season's Screamings	Pam	Short film

Web roles
Year	Title	Role	Notes	Ref.
2026	Friday the 13th: Camp Crystal Legacy	Herself	2 episodes; documentary web series	

== Sources ==
- Dobbs, G. Michael (2014). Fifteen Minutes With... : 40 Years of Interviews. BearManor Media. ISBN 978-1-593-93592-4.
