= Mark Venturini =

American actor (1961–1996)

- Born: January 10, 1961; Elmhurst, Illinois, U.S.
- Died: February 14, 1996 (aged 35); Los Angeles, California, U.S.
- Education: West Leyden High School
- Occupation: Actor
- Years active: 1984–1996

Mark D. Venturini (January 10, 1961 – February 14, 1996) was an American actor. He was best known for his roles as Suicide in the cult classic films, The Return of the Living Dead and Victor in Friday the 13th: A New Beginning.

== Personal life and career ==
Mark Venturini was born to parents Osvaldo and Carmelina Venturini (née DeAngelis) and raised in Illinois. He had two brothers, Ralph, Patrick and a sister Emily. He attended West Leyden High School where he played football and wrestled. After graduation, he quickly pursued his acting career. He moved to California in his early 20s and began his acting career. His father owned a sandwich store in Illinois called Ozzie's. His children, including Venturini, often worked there to help out.

Venturini appeared as a contestant on Episode #4792D of The Price Is Right (aired 2/8/83), making it up on stage and winning prizes in the Clock Game but going over in the Showcase Showdown spins.

Venturini was perhaps best known for his role in movies like Friday the 13th: A New Beginning (1985) as Vic Faden, and The Return of the Living Dead (1985) as Suicide. Venturini's final role was in the movie Out-of-Sync (1995). He made guest appearances on television series like Fantasy Island, Knight Rider, Charles in Charge, Murder, She Wrote, Falcon Crest, and Space Rangers.

Venturini died from leukemia on Valentine's Day 1996 at age 35. He was buried in Queen of Heaven Cemetery in Hillside, Illinois.

== Filmography ==
=== Movies ===
Year	Title	Role	Notes
1985	Friday the 13th: A New Beginning	Victor J. "Vic" Faden	
1985	The Return of the Living Dead	"Suicide"	
1987	Best Seller	Bodyguard #2	
1989	Nam Angels	Bonelli	
1992	Drive Like Lightning	Al	
1992	Mikey	Detective Jack Reynolds	
1995	Out-of-Sync	Nut	(final film role)

=== Television ===
Year	Title	Role	Notes
1984	Fantasy Island	George	1 episode: "Sing Melancholy Baby/The Last Dogfight"
1985	Knight Rider	Keith Lawson	1 episode: "Knight Song"
1987	Murder, She Wrote	Leon Bigard	1 episode: "The Corpse Flew First Class"
1987	Duet	Eddie	2 episodes
1987–1988	Charles in Charge	Herman Holloway	2 episodes: "Feud for Thought", "May the Best Man Lose"
1990	Falcon Crest	John "Big John"	1 episode: "Dark Streets"
1993	Renegade		1 episode: "Lyon's Roar"
1993	Space Rangers	Lieutenant	1 episode: "The Replacements"
