= Friday the 13th: A New Beginning =

1985 film by Danny Steinmann

- Theatrical release poster
- Directed by: Danny Steinmann
- Screenplay by: Martin Kitrosser; David Cohen; Danny Steinmann
- Story by: Martin Kitrosser; David Cohen
- Based on: Characters by Victor Miller
- Produced by: Timothy Silver
- Starring: Melanie Kinnaman; John Shepherd; Shavar Ross; Richard Young; Marco St. John
- Cinematography: Stephen L. Posey
- Edited by: Bruce Green
- Music by: Harry Manfredini
- Production companies: Georgetown Productions Inc.; Terror, Inc.
- Distributed by: Paramount Pictures
- Release date: March 22, 1985
- Running time: 92 minutes
- Country: United States
- Language: English
- Budget: $2.2 million
- Box office: $21.9 million

Friday the 13th: A New Beginning (also known as Friday the 13th Part V: A New Beginning) is a 1985 American slasher film directed by Danny Steinmann and starring Melanie Kinnaman, John Shepherd, and Shavar Ross. The film also features a cameo appearance from Corey Feldman, who portrayed Tommy Jarvis in the previous film. It is a sequel to Friday the 13th: The Final Chapter (1984) and the fifth installment in the Friday the 13th franchise. Set years after the events of the previous film, the story follows a teenage Tommy Jarvis (Shepherd), who is institutionalized at a halfway house near Crystal Lake because of nightmares of mass murderer Jason Voorhees (Tom Morga), whom he killed as a child. Tommy must face his fears when a new hockey mask-wearing murderer initiates another violent killing spree in the area.

A New Beginning features a high number of on-screen murders. Aside from its gore and violence, the film has also become known for its explicit nudity, sex scenes, and numerous depictions of illicit drug use. Peter Bracke's book Crystal Lake Memories: The Complete History of Friday the 13th details that the production was plagued with rampant drug use behind the scenes.

Shot in California in 1984 on a budget of $2.2 million, A New Beginning was released theatrically on March 22, 1985, and grossed $21.9 million at the U.S. box office. The film was initially going to set up a new trilogy of films with a different villain for the series but, after a disappointing reception from fans and a steep decline in box-office receipts from Friday the 13th Part III (1982) and The Final Chapter, Jason Voorhees was brought back for the next installment, Friday the 13th Part VI: Jason Lives (1986), and has been the main antagonist in the series since. In addition to weak box office returns, the film received mostly negative reviews from critics.

== Plot ==
Five years after killing mass murderer Jason Voorhees, (Note: As depicted in Friday the 13th: The Final Chapter (1984)) a teenage Tommy Jarvis is tormented by nightmares of him, resulting in his internment in numerous psychiatric hospitals. He is eventually transferred to the Pinehurst Halfway House, managed by Dr. Matt Letter and his assistant Pam Roberts.

There, Tommy meets a circle of other teens, including lovers Eddie and Tina, the stutterer Jake, punk Violet, the serious Robin, the compulsive eater Joey, and the young Reggie, whose grandfather George works as the facility's cook. The group is disliked by their foul-mouthed neighbor, Ethel, as Eddie and Tina habitually engage in sexual intercourse on her property. For this reason, Matt forbids the group from venturing outside the facility's premises.

Vic, a violent-tempered patient who hates being in the institute, is gripped by a fit of madness caused by Joey's impertinence and brutally kills him with an axe. This leads to his arrest by the cops while the paramedics take the corpse of Joey. That evening, two greasers, Vinnie and Pete, are murdered by an unseen assailant after their car breaks down, and Lana, a diner waitress and her boyfriend Billy are killed the following night. Local Sheriff Cal Tucker theorizes that Jason Voorhees has come back to life and is the perpetrator of these murders, while suspicion is cast on Tommy.

The next morning, Eddie and Tina go into the forest and have sex while smoking cannabis. They are watched by Ethel's farmhand who is killed soon after. After returning from washing off in the pond, Eddie finds Tina murdered, and he soon meets the same fate. Meanwhile, Reggie begs George to let him visit his brother Demon, who has just returned to town, and Pam offers to accompany him while bringing Tommy along. Tommy meets Ethel's son Junior and gets into a fight with him, but then runs away into the forest after realizing his actions. After Pam and Reggie leave to find Tommy, Demon and his girlfriend are slaughtered.

Upon Pam and Reggie's return to the institute, they are told of Matt's and George's disappearances. Pam searches for them, entrusting Reggie to Violet, Jake, and Robin. Ethel and Junior are killed, as are Jake, Robin, and Violet after Reggie falls asleep. Reggie awakens just as Pam returns, and they discover corpses in Tommy's room. Moments later, Jason Voorhees, apparently resurrected, bursts into the house.

After a long chase in which Pam and Reggie find the corpses of paramedic Duke, Matt, and George, Jason is struck by a tractor driven by Reggie and lured into a barn. Tommy returns and is attacked by Jason. He defends himself but is knocked unconscious after being helped to the loft of the barn. Pam and Reggie set a trap and kick Jason from the loft window, but he holds on and grabs Reggie. During the commotion, Tommy regains consciousness, grabs Jason's machete, cuts his hand off, and Jason falls from the loft window onto a tractor harrow, which kills him instantly. The killer's hockey mask comes off, revealing that "Jason" was Roy Burns, one of the paramedics who arrived at the scene of Joey's murder. Sheriff Tucker later identifies Roy as Joey's father and determines that he went insane after his son's death and sought revenge.

While recovering in the hospital, Tommy has another hallucination of Jason, but he faces his fears and makes him disappear. He then hears Pam approaching and smashes the window to appear as though he has escaped. When Pam rushes in, Tommy appears behind the door wearing Roy's hockey mask and wielding a kitchen knife.

== Cast ==
- Melanie Kinnaman as Pam Roberts
- John Shepherd as Tommy Jarvis
  - Corey Feldman as Tommy Jarvis at 12
- Shavar Ross as Reggie Winter
- Richard Young as Dr. Matt Letter
- Marco St. John as Sheriff Cal Tucker
- Tiffany Helm as Violet Moraine
- Juliette Cummins as Robin Brown
- Carol Locatell as Ethel Hubbard
- Vernon Washington as George Winter
- John Robert Dixon as Eddie Kelso
- Jerry Pavlon as Jake Patterson
- William Caskey Swaim as Duke Johnson
- Mark Venturini as Victor Faden
- Anthony Barrile as Vinnie Manalo
- Dominick Brascia as Joey Burns
- Richard Lineback as Deputy Dodd
- Suzanne Bateman as Nurse Yates
- Bob De Simone as Billy Macauley
- Jeré Fields as Anita Robb
- Ric Mancini as Mayor Cobb
- Miguel A. Nunez Jr. as Demon Winter
- Corey Parker as Pete Linley
- Rebecca Wood-Sharkey as Lana Ardsley
- Ron Sloan as Junior Hubbard
- Debi Sue "Debisue" Voorhees as Tina McCarthy
- Dick Wieand as Roy Burns
- Todd Bryant as Neil
- Curtis Conaway as Les
- Sonny Shields as Raymond Joffroy
- Eddie Matthews as Second Deputy
- Chuck Wells as Third Deputy

Tom Morga appears, uncredited, as Jason Voorhees. John Hock appeared as Jason Voorhees in the opening dream sequence because Morga was unavailable when the scene was shot. He also performed the stunt where Roy fell off the barn.

== Production ==
=== Casting ===
The hockey mask design used in A New Beginning. Unlike the one worn by main series antagonist Jason Voorhees, which has red stripes, this model has blue stripes; a subtle hint for the audience that the killer in the film is not Jason.

Friday the 13th: A New Beginning was cast under a fake title, Repetition, and many of the actors in the film were not aware it was a Friday the 13th installment until after they were cast in their roles. Among the unaware cast was lead actor John Shepherd, who spent several months volunteering at a state mental hospital to prepare for the role, and that he felt "really disappointed" to discover that Repetition was actually the fifth entry in the Friday the 13th series. Actor Dick Wieand stated "It wasn't until I saw Part V that I realized what a piece of trash it was. I mean, I knew the series' reputation, but you're always hoping that yours is going to come out better", and director Danny Steinmann stated that he "shot a fucking porno in the woods there. You wouldn't believe the nudity they cut out."

Corey Feldman was only able to make a cameo appearance in the film as a result of his involvement as an actor in The Goonies, which was released the same year as A New Beginning. Feldman filmed the inserts of his cameo on a Sunday, as that was his off day of shooting his other film, and the footage was shot in the backyard of his family's home in Los Angeles with a rain machine.

The film is the only entry in the Friday the 13th film series to feature a hockey mask design with two blue triangles pointing downward, as opposed to the more common variant of three red triangles, with the lower two pointing upward.

== Music ==
Friday the 13th: A New Beginning

Soundtrack album by Harry Manfredini
- Released: January 13, 2012
- Recorded: 1985
- Genre: Film score
- Length: 48:20
- Label: La-La Land

On January 13, 2012, La-La Land Records released a limited edition 6-CD boxset containing Harry Manfredini's scores from the first six Friday the 13th films. Due to the original source tapes being considered missing at the time, the music for this movie, along with Parts 1–4, were instead sourced from the original sound stem. It sold out in less than 24 hours. In 2018, the soundtrack was reissued alongside Friday the 13th: The Final Chapter as a separate 2-Disc set, using the same 2012 master.

On September 10, 2024, La-La Land Records released an expanded edition titled "The Ultimate Cut", remastered from the original source tapes and featuring cues not heard or used in the final film.

== Release ==
=== Home media ===
Friday the 13th: A New Beginning was released on LaserDisc, Betamax, VHS, and CED in 1986, and reissued on VHS in 1994 by Paramount Home Video. Paramount released it in the United States on DVD on September 25, 2001. In 2009, Paramount reissued its Friday the 13th films on DVD in "Deluxe Editions", reissuing A New Beginning on June 16, 2009. This release featured several newly commissioned bonus materials, including an audio commentary and interviews with the cast and crew.

Paramount and Warner Brothers co-released the Friday the 13th: The Complete Collection Blu-ray box set on September 13, 2013, featuring each of the twelve films; this marked the first Blu-ray release of A New Beginning. Paramount and Warner reissued the film as a standalone double-feature Blu-ray paired with Friday the 13th Part VI: Jason Lives in 2014. Paramount re-released the film in another box set titled, Friday the 13th: The Ultimate Collection in February 2018; the box set features only the first eight films of the franchise.

== Reception ==
=== Box office ===
Friday the 13th: A New Beginning opened on March 22, 1985, on 1,759 screens. The film debuted at number 1 on its opening weekend with a gross of $8,032,883, beating the teen sex comedy sequel Porky's Revenge, the biopic Mask, Berry Gordy's martial-arts action musical The Last Dragon and the Disney dinosaur fantasy Baby: Secret of the Lost Legend. By the end of its theatrical run, the film earned $22 million at the US box office, placing it at number 41 on the list of 1985's top box office earners. The film faced competition throughout the first half of the year against horror releases Cat's Eye and Lifeforce.

=== Critical response ===
On the review aggregator website Rotten Tomatoes, Friday the 13th: A New Beginning holds an approval rating of 11% based on 84 reviews. The consensus summarizes: "Failing even as mindless splatter entertainment, Friday the 13th Part V: A New Beginning crudely hacks its way through a repetitive parade of uninspired kills with little style or tension." On Metacritic, it has a weighted average score of 16 out of 100 based on eight critics, indicating "overwhelming dislike."

Gene Siskel of the Chicago Tribune criticized the film for a perceived lack of originality and said there "is little suspense". Variety wrote that it has "even less variation than its predecessors". Vincent Canby of The New York Times wrote, "It's worth recognizing only as an artifact of our culture." A review in the British film journal Films and Filming was critical of its redundancy in comparison to the previous sequels. Henry Edgar of the Daily Press wrote: "If you like the others in this series, you'll like this one. If you didn't, stay away. Jason has his own followers, and he seems willing to continue the bloodshed forever." Steve Davis of The Austin Chronicle criticized the film's repetitive scenes mimicking previous films. Scott Meslow of GQ called the film "the bloodiest, most deranged" installment in the series, noting its total of 22 murder sequences. Leonard Maltin in his movie guide awarded the film the lowest possible rating and called it "as gruesome and disgusting as ever". Writing for Slant Magazine, Jeremiah Kipp wrote that the film has "more plot than usual", but "the tone is crude, raunchy, and leering".

== Bibliography ==
- Bracke, Peter (2006). Crystal Lake Memories: The Complete History of Friday the 13th (First ed.). London: Titan Books. ISBN 1845763432.
- Maltin, Leonard (2008). Sader, Luke; Clark, Mike (eds.). Leonard Maltin's 2009 Movie Guide. New York: Penguin. ISBN 978-0-452-28978-9.
- Pratt, Douglas (1988). The Laser Video Disc Companion: A Guide to the Best (and Worst) Laser Video Discs. New York: New York Zoetrope. ISBN 978-0-918-43286-5.
