= Friday the 13th (1980 film) =

1980 slasher film by Sean S. Cunningham

- Theatrical release poster by Alex Ebel
- Directed by: Sean S. Cunningham
- Written by: Victor Miller
- Produced by: Sean S. Cunningham
- Starring: Betsy Palmer; Adrienne King; Harry Crosby; Laurie Bartram; Mark Nelson; Jeannine Taylor; Robbi Morgan; Kevin Bacon
- Cinematography: Barry Abrams
- Edited by: Bill Freda
- Music by: Harry Manfredini
- Production company: Georgetown Productions Inc.
- Distributed by: Paramount Pictures (United States and Canada); Warner Bros. (International)
- Release date: May 9, 1980
- Running time: 95 minutes
- Country: United States
- Language: English
- Budget: $550,000–$650,000
- Box office: $59.8 million

Friday the 13th is a 1980 American slasher film produced and directed by Sean S. Cunningham, written by Victor Miller, and starring Betsy Palmer, Adrienne King, Harry Crosby, Laurie Bartram, Mark Nelson, Jeannine Taylor, Robbi Morgan, and Kevin Bacon. The plot follows a group of teenage camp counselors who are murdered one by one by an unknown killer while they are attempting to reopen an abandoned summer camp with a tragic past.

Prompted by the success of John Carpenter's Halloween (1978), Cunningham put out an advertisement to sell the film in Variety in early 1979, while Miller was still drafting the screenplay. After casting the film in New York City, filming took place in New Jersey in the fall of 1979, with an estimated budget of between $550,000 and $650,000. A bidding war ensued over the finished film, ending with Paramount Pictures acquiring the film for domestic distribution, while Warner Bros. secured international distribution rights. Friday the 13th became the first independent slasher film to be acquired by a major motion picture studio.

Released on May 9, 1980, Friday the 13th was a major box office success, grossing $59.8 million worldwide, making it the fifteenth highest-grossing film of the year, and the second highest-grossing film for Paramount. The film's original critical response was largely unfavorable, with numerous critics deriding it for its graphic violence, though it did receive some praise for its cinematography and score.

Aside from being the first independent film of its kind to secure distribution in the U.S. by a major studio, its box office success led to a long series of sequels, a crossover with the A Nightmare on Elm Street film series, a 2009 series reboot and two television shows. A direct sequel, Friday the 13th Part 2, was released the following year.

== Plot ==
In 1958 at Camp Crystal Lake, camp counselors Barry and Claudette sneak away from other counselors for a late night rendezvous in a supply shed where they are murdered.

On Friday, June 13, 1979, a camp counselor and cook named Annie hitchhikes with truck driver Enos toward the reopened Camp Crystal Lake. Enos warns her about the camp's troubled past, beginning when a young boy drowned in Crystal Lake in 1957. After Enos drops Annie off at a crossroads, she hitches another ride from an unseen person driving a Jeep. After the driver passes the camp entrance, Annie becomes fearful and leaps from the vehicle, fleeing into the woods where the driver eventually slashes her throat.

Counselors Ned, Jack, Bill, Marcie, Brenda, and Alice arrive at the camp. Alice, along with owner Steve Christy, refurbish the cabins and prepare for incoming campers. As a thunderstorm approaches, Steve leaves for supplies. Ned sees a cloaked figure walk into a cabin and follows. Later, while Jack and Marcie have sex, they are unaware of Ned's dead body above them in the bunk bed. When Marcie leaves the cabin for the public bathroom, the killer pierces Jack's throat with an arrow before following Marcie into the bathroom and killing her with an axe. After playing strip Monopoly with Alice and Bill, Brenda returns to her cabin. She is lured outside by a little boy's voice calling for help and ventures toward the camp's archery range, where the floodlights suddenly turn on and she is attacked offscreen by the killer.

Alice hears Brenda screaming. Worried by their friends' disappearances, Alice and Bill investigate. They find a bloodied axe in Brenda's bed, and the phones disconnected. Steve returns and, at the camp's entrance, recognizes the unseen killer, who stabs him. When the power goes out, Bill goes to check on the generator. Alice later finds his body pinned to the door with arrows. She flees to the main cabin and barricades herself inside, before the killer hurls Brenda's body through a window.

Mrs. Voorhees, a middle-aged woman who claims to be a friend of the Christys, arrives at the camp. She reveals that it is her son Jason's birthday and that he was the young boy who drowned in 1957. She blames his death on the counselors who failed to supervise him, instead having sex. Revealing herself as the killer, she brutally attacks Alice. Alice flees, discovering the bodies of Annie and Steve in the process. Following a chase throughout the camp and several physical altercations, Mrs. Voorhees finally confronts Alice on the lakeshore. The two struggle until Alice decapitates Mrs. Voorhees with a machete. Exhausted, Alice seeks refuge inside a canoe, which she pushes out onto the lake, and falls asleep.

At dawn, police officers arrive moments before Jason's decomposing corpse rises from the lake and pulls Alice underwater. She then awakens in a hospital, surrounded by a police sergeant and medical staff. The sergeant says that there was no sign of a boy at the lake. Alice replies, "Then he's still there."

== Cast ==
- Adrienne King as Alice
- Harry Crosby as Bill
- Jeannine Taylor as Marcie
- Laurie Bartram as Brenda
- Kevin Bacon as Jack
- Mark Nelson as Ned
- Robbi Morgan as Annie
- Peter Brouwer as Steve Christy
- Rex Everhart as the truck driver
- Ronn Carroll as Sgt. Tierney
- Walt Gorney as Crazy Ralph
- Willie Adams as Barry
- Debra S. Hayes as Claudette
- Sally Anne Golden as Sandy
- Betsy Palmer as Mrs. Voorhees
- Ari Lehman as Jason

== Production ==
=== Development ===
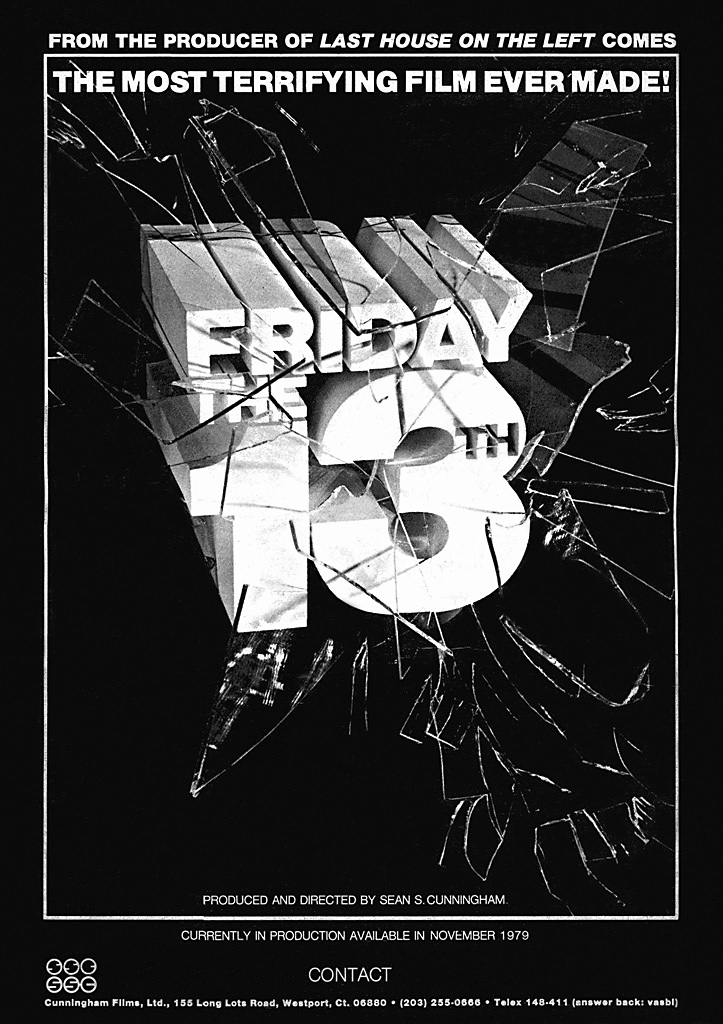
Friday the 13th did not have a completed script when Sean S. Cunningham took out this advertisement in Variety.

Friday the 13th was produced and directed by Sean S. Cunningham, who had previously worked with filmmaker Wes Craven on the film The Last House on the Left (1972). Cunningham, inspired by John Carpenter's Halloween (1978), wanted Friday the 13th to be shocking, visually stunning and "[make] you jump out of your seat." Wanting to distance himself from The Last House on the Left, Cunningham wanted Friday the 13th to be more of a "roller-coaster ride".

The original screenplay was tentatively titled A Long Night at Camp Blood. While working on a redraft of the screenplay, Cunningham proposed the title Friday the 13th, after which Miller began redeveloping. Cunningham initially proposed the title Friday the 13th for a list of titles for his comedy film Manny's Orphans (1978). Cunningham rushed out to place an advertisement in Variety using the Friday the 13th title. Worried that someone else owned the rights to the title and wanting to avoid potential lawsuits, Cunningham thought it would be best to find out immediately. He commissioned a New York advertising agency to develop his concept of the Friday the 13th logo, which consisted of big block letters bursting through a pane of glass. In the end, Cunningham believed there were "no problems" with the title, but distributor George Mansour stated, "There was a movie before ours called Friday the 13th: The Orphan. It was moderately successful. But someone still threatened to sue. Either Phil Scuderi paid them off, but it was finally resolved."

The screenplay was completed in mid-1979 by Victor Miller, who later went on to write for several television soap operas, including Guiding Light, One Life to Live and All My Children; at the time, Miller was living in Stratford, Connecticut, near Cunningham, and the two had begun collaborating on potential film projects. Miller delighted in inventing a serial killer who turned out to be somebody's mother, a murderer whose only motivation was her love for her child: "I took motherhood and turned it on its head and I think that was great fun. Mrs. Voorhees was the mother I'd always wanted—a mother who would have killed for her kids." While writing the film's death scenes, Miller incorporated elements of nightmares he had experienced throughout his life in which he was murdered.

The idea of Jason appearing at the end of the film was initially not present in the original script; in Miller's final draft, the film ended with Alice merely floating on the lake. Jason's appearance was actually suggested by makeup designer Tom Savini. Savini stated that "The whole reason for the cliffhanger at the end was I had just seen Carrie, so we thought that we need a 'chair jumper' like that, and I said, 'let's bring in Jason.'" Miller was unhappy about the filmmakers' decision to make Jason Voorhees the killer in the sequels, saying "Jason was dead from the very beginning. He was a victim, not a villain."

=== Casting ===
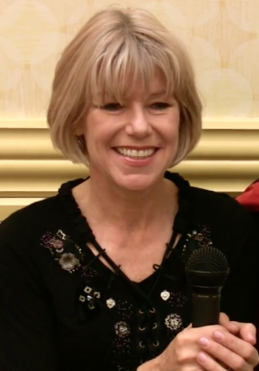
Cunningham cast Adrienne King in the role of Alice due to her naturalistic acting.

A New York-based firm, headed by Julie Hughes and Barry Moss, was hired to find eight young actors to play the camp's staff members. Cunningham admits that he was not looking for "great actors", but anyone that was likable, and appeared to be a responsible camp counselor. The way Cunningham saw it, the actors would need to look good, read the dialogue somewhat well, and work cheap. Moss and Hughes were happy to find four actors, Kevin Bacon, Laurie Bartram, Peter Brouwer, and Adrienne King, who had previously appeared on soap operas. The role of Alice was set up as an open casting call, a publicity stunt used to attract more attention to the film. The producers originally wanted Sally Field for the role of Alice, but realized that they could not afford an established high-profile actress and went for unknowns instead. As Cunningham explains, he was looking for actors that could behave naturally, which he felt King demonstrated.

With King cast in the role of lead heroine Alice, Laurie Bartram was hired to play Brenda. Kevin Bacon, Mark Nelson, and Jeannine Taylor, who had known each other prior through mutual stage work, were cast as Jack, Ned, and Marcie respectively. It is Bacon and Nelson's contention that, because the three already knew each other, they already had the specific chemistry the casting director was looking for in their roles. Taylor has stated that Hughes and Moss were highly regarded while she was an actress, so when they offered her an audition she felt that, whatever the part, it would "be a good opportunity."

Friday the 13th was Nelson's first feature film, and when he went in for his first audition, the only thing he was given to read were some comedic scenes. Nelson received a call back for a second audition, which required him to wear a bathing suit. The character is regarded as one of the first "practical joker victim[s]," a trope seen in subsequent slasher films. According to author David Grove, there was no equivalent character in John Carpenter's Halloween, or Bob Clark's Black Christmas (1974) before that. He served as a model for the slasher films that would follow Friday the 13th.

Estelle Parsons was the first choice to portray Mrs. Voorhees but declined, as her agent said that the film was too violent, though Miller later stated that Parsons could not do it due to a scheduling change. Shelley Winters and Dorothy Malone were also offered the part, but turned it down, while Louise Lasser was considered. Hughes and Moss sent a copy of the script to Betsy Palmer, in hopes that she would accept the part. Palmer could not understand why someone would want her for a part in a horror film, as she felt the role was casting against type. Palmer only agreed to play the role because she needed the funds to purchase a new car, even though she believed the film would "be a piece of shit." Stavrakis performed as a double for Palmer as well, primarily during the stalking scene involving Morgan's character, where only the killer's feet and legs are seen. Morgan's training as an acrobat assisted her in these scenes, as her character was required to leap out of a moving Jeep when she discovers that Mrs. Voorhees does not intend to take her to the camp.

Palmer, an adherent to the Stanislavsky method, created her own backstory for Pamela Voorhees in preparation for the role: Palmer envisioned that, while a teenager, Pamela had given birth to her son, Jason, out of wedlock, and was disowned by her family. After struggling to raise Jason as a single mother, and following his subsequent drowning due to the counselors' negligence, she "became very psychotic and puritanical in her attitudes as she was determined to kill all of the immoral camp counselors." Cunningham wanted to make the Mrs. Voorhees character "terrifying", and to that end he believed it was important that Palmer not act "over the top." There was also the fear that Palmer's past credits, as more of a wholesome character, would make it difficult to believe she could be scary. Palmer was paid $1000 per day for her ten days on set.

Ari Lehman, who had previously auditioned for Cunningham's Manny's Orphans, failing to get the part, was determined to land the role of Jason Voorhees. According to Lehman, he went in very intense and afterward Cunningham told him he was perfect for the part.

=== Filming ===
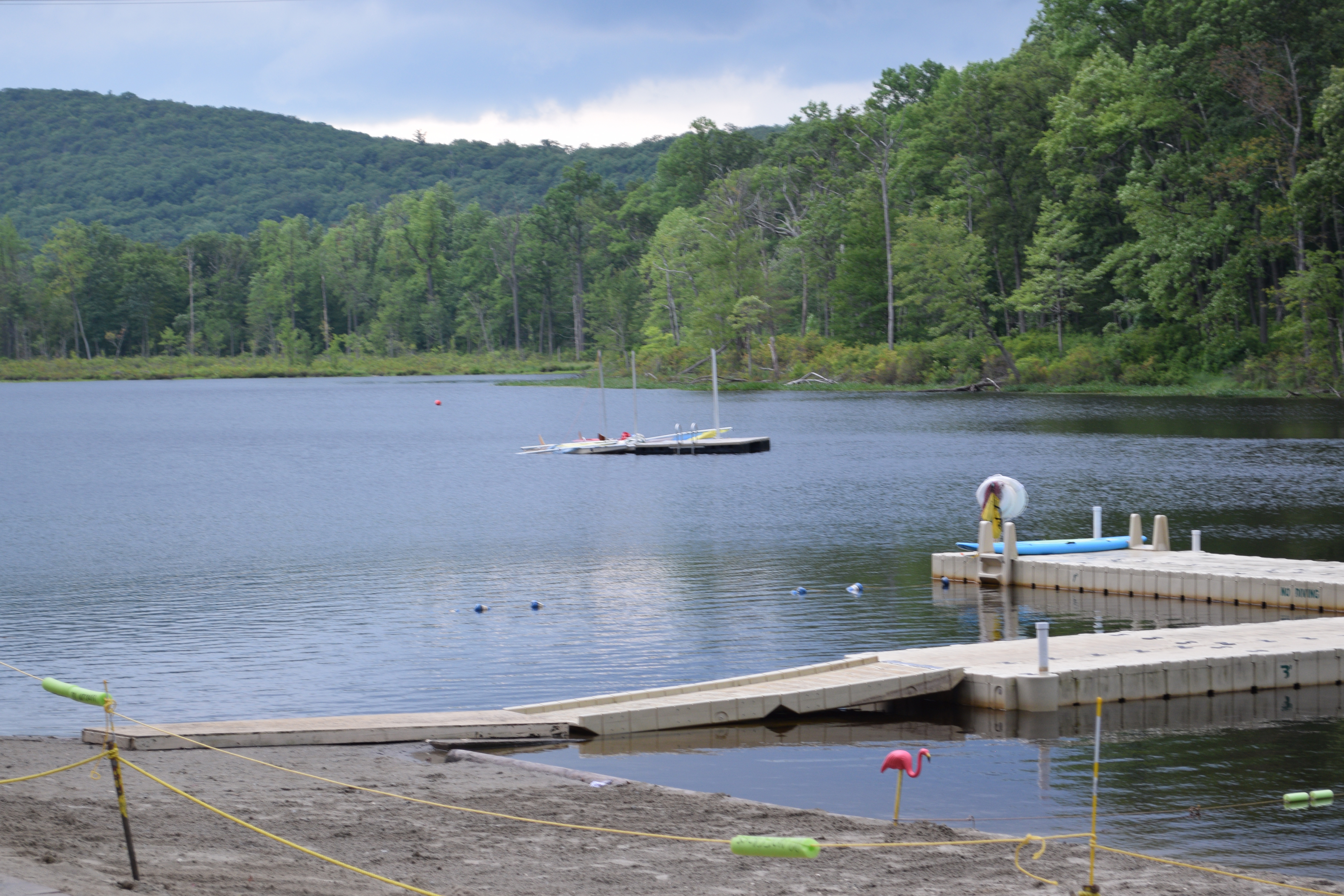
Camp No-Be-Bo-Sco, where much of the film was shot

Friday the 13th was shot in and around the townships of Hardwick, Blairstown, and Hope, in Warren County, New Jersey beginning in early September 1979. (Note: A production report for the film notes the first official day of shooting was September 4, 1979, though some sources state the film began shooting on September 10, 1979.) The camp scenes were shot on a working Boy Scout camp, Camp No-Be-Bo-Sco, which is located in Hardwick. During the initial stages of filming, Cunningham and Miller continued to write and re-write sequences with contributions from Ron Kurz, though only Miller received screenwriting credit.

The weather on set was described as "bitterly cold" at times, especially during the filming of the opening prologue scene in which Barry and Claudette are murdered, a sequence which was originally intended to take place while the couple were walking along the lake. Unexpected snowfall forced the scene to be reworked to take place inside a barn, as the film is set during the summertime. Actor Harry Crosby also commented on the cool weather conditions, stating that "it was very cold on the set by the end [of filming]," but that Cunningham, the cast, and crew maintained "a very pleasant attitude" despite this. Actress Robbi Morgan recalled filming all of her scenes in a single day. Reshoots and additional photography occurred as late as November 1979.

The cinematography in the film employs recurrent point-of-view shots from the perspective of the villain. Due to the film's limited production budget, few exterior lights were used, resulting in many of the nighttime sequences appearing very dark. The production also could not afford stunt doubles for King or Palmer, necessitating both actresses to perform their own stunts and choreograph their fight sequences themselves. During the filming of the fight sequences, Palmer suggested rehearsing the scene based on her theater training: "I said to Adrienne that night, 'Why don't we rehearse this scene, I have to slap you,' because on stage when you slap somebody, you slap them." While rehearsing, Palmer slapped King in the face, and she began crying: "She collapsed to the floor, crying, 'Sean! [Cunningham] She hit me.' I said, 'Well, of course I hit her, we were rehearsing the scene.' He said, 'No, no, no Betsy, we don't hit people in movies. We miss them.'"

A live snake was killed during filming as part of a scene where Alice discovers it in her cabin. Adrienne King said in the book Crystal Lake Memories that she was shocked, and that "the owner of the snake was just standing off to the side, tears running down his cheeks."

=== Special effects ===
Storyboard sketch demonstrating the special effects methods used to achieve Jack's death scene in the film

Tom Savini was hired to design the film's special effects based upon his work in George A. Romero's Dawn of the Dead (1978). Savini's design contributions included crafting the effects of Marcie's axe wound to the face, the arrow penetrating Jack's throat, and Mrs. Voorhees's decapitation by the machete.

Jack's murder scene as he is lying in bed was accomplished using a prosthetic neck piece, with actor Kevin Bacon's head inserted from below through the mattress, while the rest of his body remained seated on the floor. A bag of fake blood with a pump was designed, which spurted fake blood through the hole pierced in the prosthetic neck with an arrow. During the scene, the pump with the fake blood malfunctioned, which led to Stavrakis blowing air through it.

Savini intended to shoot Marcie's death sequence in graphic detail, with a view of the axe grinding into her face, but attempts at doing so were unsuccessful, as the axe recurrently slid across the mold. Instead, the filmmakers resorted to a cutaway shot in which Marcie is seen with the axe statically plunged into her face.

While Bill's death sequence was not shown on camera, Savini and Stavrakis created fake arrows which were attached to his body and harnessed him to a door, recreating an appearance that was described in the screenplay to the martyrdom of Saint Sebastian. Actor Harry Crosby recounted that the cosmetics to achieve this were uncomfortable as one of the prop arrows was affixed to his closed eye, making it appear as though he had been shot through his eye socket. Chemicals in the fake blood used during the sequence resulted in Crosby becoming temporarily blind in one eye.

For Mrs. Voorhees's death scene, Savini created a prosthetic head moulded from Palmer's, and filmed the shot of her decapitation without actresses King or Palmer present.

== Music ==
Friday the 13th

Soundtrack album by Harry Manfredini
- Released: January 13, 2012
- Recorded: 1980
- Genre: Film score
- Length: 43:41
- Labels: Gramavision Records; La-La Land Records

When Harry Manfredini began working on the musical score, the decision was made to only play music to represent the stalker so as to not "manipulate the audience". (Music does play in scenes in which the stalker and their POV are absent, such as Ralph's appearance at the camp and when Bill refuels the generator.) Manfredini pointed out the lack of music for certain scenes: "There's a scene where one of the girls ... is setting up the archery area... One of the guys shoots an arrow into the target and just misses her. It's a huge scare, but if you notice, there's no music. That was a [deliberate] choice." Manfredini also noted that when something was about to happen, the music would cut out so that the audience would relax, rendering the subsequent scare more effective.

Because the killer, Mrs. Voorhees, appears onscreen only during the final scenes of the film, Manfredini had the job of creating a score that would represent the killer in her absence. Manfredini borrows from Jaws (1975), where the shark is likewise not seen for the majority of the film but the motif created by John Williams cued the audience to the shark's invisible menace. The score's strings also recall Bernard Herrmann's score for Psycho.

"Main Theme"
Harry Manfredini's main theme for Friday the 13th features atonal arrangements and vocal cues that became popularly emblematic of the film

While listening to a Krzysztof Penderecki composition, which contained a chorus with "striking pronunciations", Manfredini was inspired to recreate a similar sound. He came up with the sound "ki ki ki, ma ma ma" from the final reel when Mrs. Voorhees arrives and is reciting "Kill her, mommy!" The "ki" comes from "kill", and the "ma" from "mommy". To achieve the unique sound he wanted for the film, Manfredini spoke the two words "harshly, distinctly and rhythmically into a microphone" and ran them into an Echoplex machine. Manfredini finished the original score over approximately two weeks, and then recorded it in a friend's basement. Victor Miller and assistant editor Jay Keuper have commented on how memorable the music is, with Keuper describing it as "iconographic". Manfredini says, "Everybody thinks it's cha, cha, cha. I'm like, 'Cha, cha, cha? What are you talking about?'"

Music historian Randall D. Larson describes Manfredini's score as "an effectual atonal composition for strings, brass, keyboard and voice." Rachel Reeves, writing for Bloody Disgusting in 2024, praised the score, observing: "More than just beautifully evocative and eerily unsettling, the music is one of the key elements that elevates the film from a copycat cash grab to a worthy slasher successor." Reeves opined that the film's score was mimicked in subsequent slasher films like My Bloody Valentine (1981), The Slumber Party Massacre (1982), A Nightmare on Elm Street (1984), and Candyman (1992).

In 1982, Gramavision Records released an LP record of selected pieces of Harry Manfredini's scores from the first three Friday the 13th films. On January 13, 2012, La-La Land Records released a limited edition 6-CD boxset containing Manfredini's scores from the first six films. It sold out in less than 24 hours. In 2021, La-La Land Records released an expanded "Ultimate Cut" edition of the score, featuring a new remaster sourced from the original master tapes, which were considered lost at the time of the 2012 box set's creation, as well as music cues not used or heard in the final film.

== Themes ==
=== Teen sexuality ===
Friday the 13th has been credited by numerous film scholars for popularizing the trope of teenage characters suffering violent murders after their engagement in premarital sex, a theme which is central to its plot. Film scholar Tony Williams views Friday the 13th as "symptomatic of its era", particularly Reagan-era America, and part of a trajectory of films such as The Texas Chain Saw Massacre (1974) and Race with the Devil (1975), which "exemplify a particular apocalyptic vision moving from disclosing family contradictions to self-indulgent nihilism." The film's recurring use of point-of-view shots from the killer's perspective have been noted by scholars such as Philip Dimare as "inherently voyeuristic". Dimare regards the film as a "cautionary tale that succeeds in warning against the sexual impropriety even as it fetishizes violent transgression."

Film critic Timothy Shary notes in his book Teen Movies: American Youth on Screen (2012) that while Halloween introduced a "more subtle sexual curiosity within its morbid moral lesson," films such as Friday the 13th "capitali[zed] on the reactionary aspect of teen sexuality, slaughtering wholesale those youth who deigned to cross the threshold of sexual awareness." Commenting on the film's violence and sexuality, film scholar David J. Hogan notes that, "throughout the film, teenage boys are hideously dispatched, but not with the same buildup and attention to detail that Cunningham and makeup wiz Tom Savini reserved for nubile young girls."

=== Gender of the villain ===
Friday the 13th has spurred critical discussion over the obfuscation of its villain, ultimately revealed in the finale to be Pamela Voorhees, a middle-aged woman seeking revenge over the death of her son. Jim Harper, writing in Legacy of Blood: A Comprehensive Guide to Slasher Movies (2004), describes her as the most famous example of a female antagonist in a slasher film.

This plot point is examined at length by film scholar Carol J. Clover in her book Men, Women, and Chainsaws. Clover notes the revelation of Pamela Voorhees as the killer as "the most dramatic case of pulling out the gender rug" in horror film history. Commenting on the first-person point-of-view shots from the killer, Clover writes: "'We' [the audience] stalk and kill a number of teenagers over the course of an hour of movie time without even knowing who 'we' are; we are invited, by conventional expectation and by glimpses of 'our' own bodily parts—a heavily booted foot, a roughly gloved hand—to suppose that 'we' are male, but 'we' are revealed, at the film's end, as a woman." Film scholar Sotiris Petridis echoes this assessment, commenting that the "filmic text is structured around the question of the murderer's identity, which is answered just about 15 minutes before the end of the film."

Writing for PopMatters, Francesc Quilis says Friday the 13th has a "monstrous feminine" theme derived from Alfred Hitchcock's Psycho (1960). Whereas Hitchcock's film is about a son going on a killing spree because of his dead mother, Friday the 13th is about a mother going on a killing spree because of her dead son. In The Boston Globe, Wesley Morris said Pamela Vorhees functions as a "reverse Norman Bates." He felt the killer's motive gave Friday the 13th a "psycho-social subtext" that made the film frightening despite its amateurishness.

== Release ==
=== Distribution ===
A bidding war over distribution rights to the film ensued in 1980 between Paramount Pictures, Warner Bros., and United Artists. Paramount executive Frank Mancuso, Sr. recalled: "The minute we saw Friday the 13th, we knew we had a hit." Paramount ultimately purchased domestic distribution rights for Friday the 13th for $1.5 million, while Warner Bros. secured distribution rights to the film in international markets.

Based on the success of recently released horror films (such as Halloween) and the low budget of the film, Paramount deemed it a "low-risk" release in terms of profitability. It was the first independent slasher film to be acquired by a major motion picture studio. Paramount spent approximately $500,000 in advertisements for the film, and then an additional $500,000 when the film began performing well at the box office.

=== Marketing ===
Paramount launched a $4 million marketing campaign to promote the film. A full one-sheet poster, featuring a group of teenagers imposed beneath the silhouette of a knife-wielding figure, was designed by artist Alex Ebel to promote the film's U.S. release. Paramount and producer Frank Mancuso, Sr. intended to market the film as an "illicit event" picture in the hopes of targeting the younger moviegoing public.

Scholar Richard Nowell has observed that the poster and marketing campaign presented Friday the 13th as a "light-hearted" and "youth-oriented" horror film in an attempt to draw interest from America's prime theater-going demographic of young adults and teenagers. Nowell also notes that the film's striking poster artwork served to distance the film from other independent films of the period, evoking the image of "prestige" horror films such as The Exorcist (1973). The poster was the template for one of the posters for Eli Roth's Thanksgiving (2023).

=== Home media ===
Paramount Home Entertainment first released Friday the 13th on VHS in 1981 in a gatefold-style package. The same year, Betamax, LaserDisc, and CED Videodisc editions were distributed. The film was reissued by Paramount on VHS in the fall of 1988, and again in 1994 in conjunction with the tape distribution companies Gateway and in Extended Play!. The film was given a fourth and final VHS release by Paramount in 2002, featuring alternate cover artwork.

Paramount released the film for the first time on DVD October 19, 1999 as part of the Paramount Widescreen Collection line. The disc sold 32,497 units. On February 3, 2009, Paramount released the film again on DVD and Blu-ray in an unrated uncut, for the first time in the United States (previous VHS, LaserDisc, and DVD releases included the R-rated theatrical version). The uncut version of the film contains approximately 11 seconds of previously unreleased footage.

In 2011, the uncut version of Friday the 13th was released in a 4-disc DVD collection with the first three sequels. It was again included in two Blu-ray sets: Friday the 13th: The Complete Collection, released in 2013 and Friday the 13th: The Ultimate Collection, in 2018. Paramount's Blu-ray was re-released as a 40th Anniversary Limited Edition steelbook in 2020. In 2020, to celebrate the film's 40th anniversary, Shout! Factory released a 4K scan of the original film, as well as parts 2—4, in a complete series box set on Blu-ray. In 2022, the film was released on Blu-ray in 4K Ultra HD and grossed $60,507.

== Reception ==
=== Box office ===
Friday the 13th opened theatrically on May 9, 1980, across the United States, ultimately expanding its release to 1,127 theaters. Pre-release projections from Variety predicted a "bleak" box-office performance, with the magazine declaring that the film "has nothing to exploit but its title and whatever oomph [Paramount] puts into the marketing campaign." Despite this, Friday the 13th was a major box-office hit, earning $5,816,321 in its opening weekend, before finishing domestically with $39,754,601, with a total of 14,778,700 admissions. It was the 18th highest-grossing film that year, facing competition from other high-profile horror releases such as The Shining and The Fog. The worldwide gross for the film was $59,754,601 (equivalent to $227,506,713.90 in 2024). Of the seventeen films distributed by Paramount in 1980, only one, Airplane!, returned more profits than Friday the 13th. Overall, it was the fifteenth highest-grossing American film of the year. Grove wrote that the slasher film market was oversaturated in 1980 and 1981, with the release of Friday the 13th, Prom Night (1980), Dressed to Kill (1980), Terror Train (1980), New Year's Evil (1980), Maniac (1980), Mother's Day (1980), He Knows You're Alone (1980), Funeral Home (1980), Graduation Day (1981), Hell Night (1981), My Bloody Valentine (1981), Night School (1981), Student Bodies (1981), and The Burning (1981). Only the grosses of Friday the 13th and Prom Night would live up to industry expectations.

The film earned an additional $20 million in international box office receipts. Not factoring in international sales, or the 2003 cross-over film with A Nightmare on Elm Street's Freddy Krueger, the original Friday the 13th is the highest-grossing film of the franchise.

=== Critical response ===
==== Contemporary ====
Friday the 13th received largely unfavorable reviews at the time of its original release, with many critics deriding it for its violent content and characterizing it as an exploitation film. Linda Gross of the Los Angeles Times referred to the film as a "silly, boring, youth-geared horror movie", though she praised Manfredini's "nervous musical score", the cinematography, as well as the performances, which she deemed "natural and appealing", particularly from Taylor, Bacon, Nelson, and Bartram. Variety, however, deemed the film "low budget in the worst sense—with no apparent talent or intelligence to offset its technical inadequacies—Friday the 13th has nothing to exploit but its title." The Miami News's Bill von Maurer praised Cunningham's "low-key" direction, but noted: "After building terrific suspense and turning over the audience's stomachs, he doesn't quite know where to go from there. The movie begins to sag in the middle and the expectations he has built up begin to sour a bit." Lou Cedrone of The Baltimore Evening Sun referred to the film as "a shamelessly bad film, but then Cunningham knows this. This is sad."

Many critics compared the film unfavorably against John Carpenter's Halloween, among them Marylynn Uricchio of the Pittsburgh Post-Gazette, who added: "Friday the 13th is minimal on plot, suspense, and characterization. It's not very original or very scary, but it is very low-budget." Dick Shippy of the Akron Beacon Journal similarly suggested that Carpenter's Halloween played "like Hitchcock when compared to Cunningham's dreadful tale of butchery." The Burlington Free Press's Mike Hughes wrote that the film "copies everything, that is, except the quality" of Halloween, concluding: "The lowest point of the movie comes near the end, when it exploits the genuine grief and madness of the villain. By then, things simply aren't fun anymore." Ron Cowan of the Statesman Journal noted the film as a "routine 'endangered teenagers' exploitation movie", adding that "Cunningham betrays a rather plodding approach to suspense for most of the film, sometimes allowing his camera to act as the killer, sometimes as the victim. And the victims, of course, deliberately put themselves in peril."

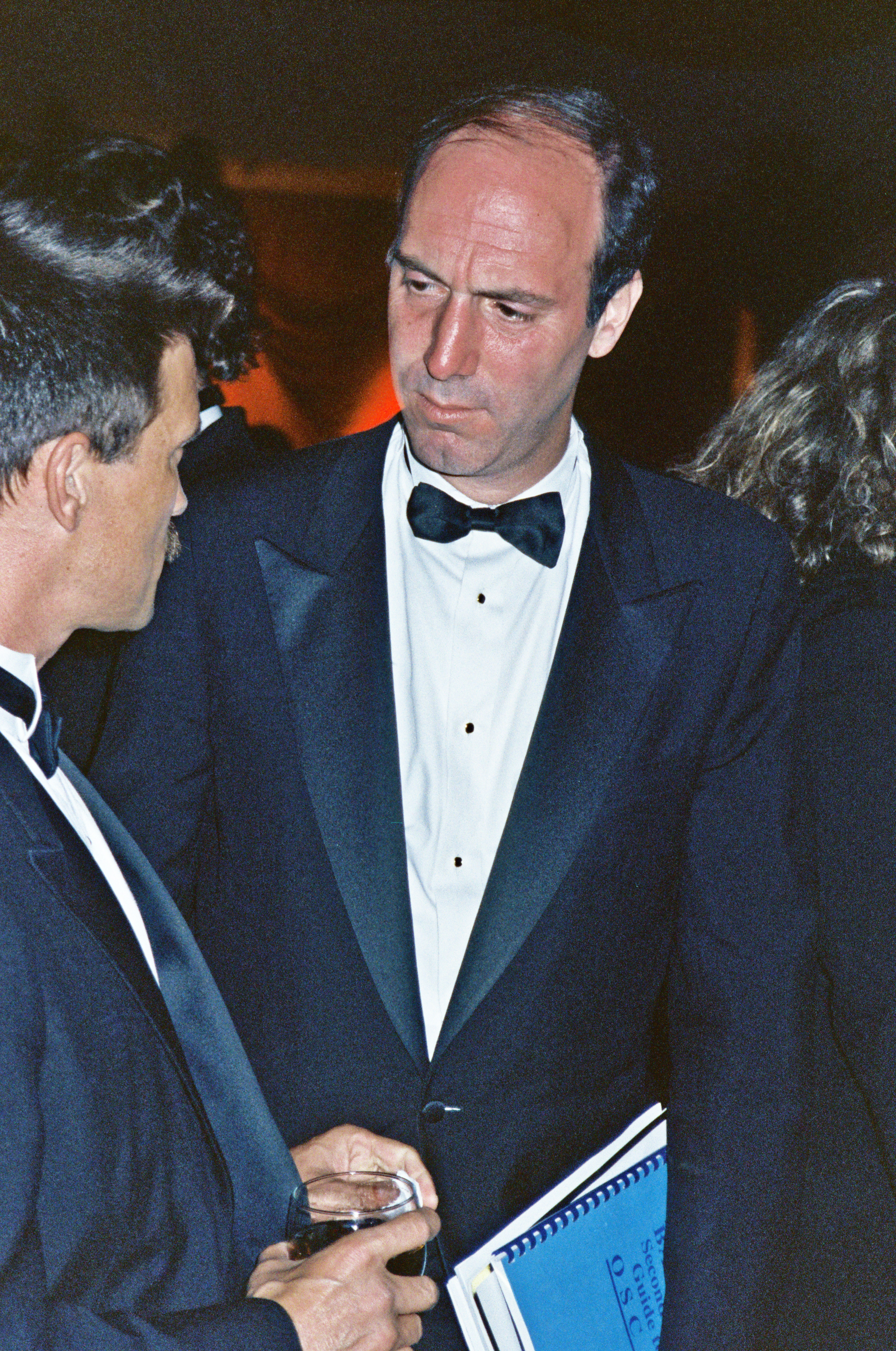
Gene Siskel was a vocal critic of the film, going so far as to publicly spoil the film's ending in an attempt to convince audiences not to see it.

A significant number of reviews criticized the film for its depiction of violence: The Hollywood Reporter derided the film, writing: "Gruesome violence, in which throats are slashed and heads are split open in realistic detail, is the sum content of Friday the 13th, a sick and sickening low budget feature that is being released by Paramount. It's blatant exploitation of the lowest order." Michael Blowen of The Boston Globe similarly referred to the film as "nauseating", warning audiences: "Unless your idea of a good time is to watch a woman have her head split by an ax or a man stuck to a door with arrows, you should stay away from Friday the 13th. It's bad luck."

One of the film's most vocal detractors was Gene Siskel, who in his review called Cunningham "one of the most despicable creatures ever to infest the movie business." He also published the address for Charles Bluhdorn, the chairman of the board of Gulf+Western, which owned Paramount, as well as Betsy Palmer's home city and encouraged fellow detractors to write to them and express their contempt for the film. Attempting to convince people not to see it, he even spoiled the film's surprise ending in his published review. Siskel and Roger Ebert spent an entire episode of their TV show berating the film (and other slasher films of the time) because they felt it would make audiences root for the killer. Leonard Maltin initially awarded the film one star, or 'BOMB', but later changed his mind and awarded the film a star and-a-half "simply because it's slightly better than Part 2" and called it a "gory, cardboard thriller...That younger viewers made it a box-office juggernaut is one more clue as to why SAT scores keep declining. Still, any movie that spawns this many sequels must have done something right".

==== Retrospective ====
Over time, the critical reception of the film has softened, with many now regarding it as a classic of the genre. On the review aggregator website Rotten Tomatoes, 49% of 123 critics' reviews are positive, with an average rating of 5.8/10. The website's consensus reads: "A grisly campfire tale in slasher form, Friday the 13th delivers a brutal showcase of creative, effects-driven kills that never quite disguises its threadbare plotting or lack of genuine chills." Metacritic, which uses a weighted average, assigned the film a score of 22 out of 100, based on 11 critics, indicating "generally unfavorable" reviews.

Bill Steele of IFC ranked the film the second-best entry in the series, after Friday the 13th Part 2 (1981). Critic Kim Newman, in a 2000 review, awarded the film two out of five stars, referring to it as "a pallid Halloween rip-off, with a mediocre shock count and a botched ending... As the bodies pile up amongst this testy crowd of horny teens, there remains a vacant hole were [sic] someone scary should be. In a strange way, this film stands unique amongst all slasher films as one where the killer is nearly intangible." Jeremiah Kipp of Slant Magazine reviewed the film in 2009, noting "a kind of minimalism at work, eschewing anything special in terms of mood, pacing, character, plot, and tension." Further commenting on the revelation of the killer's identity, Kipp observed:

The murderer turns out to be a middle-aged woman named Mrs. Voorhees (Betsy Palmer) with a butch haircut and a gigantic bulky sweater, whose line readings are akin to nails on a chalkboard ("They were making love while that boy drowned! His name was Jason!") and a predilection for speaking to herself in the mincing voice of her dead child ("Kill her, Mommy! Kill her!"). It's only in this last 20-minute appearance of this scene-stealing harpy (not to mention the memorable cameo by her rotting zombie son) that Friday the 13th becomes memorable as high camp.

Why did it make such a splash? Theories abound, but here's mine: Friday the 13th succeeded because it was brazen enough to steal so many tricks from the many brilliant horror films that came before it.

— Critic Scott Meslow on the film's legacy

In 2012, Bill Gibron of PopMatters wrote of the film: "This movie feels at least twice as long as its 90-minute running time and not always in a good way. There are far too many pointless pauses between the bloodletting. On the positive side, Tom Savini's make-up work is flawless, and Betsy Palmer's turn as big bad Pamela V. has to go down in history as one of the meanest 'mothers' in the entire horror genre. For those who think it's a classic–think again. Of a type? Absolutely. Of faultless movie macabre? No way."

Scott Meslow of The Week reviewed the film in 2015, assessing its original critical reception in a contemporary context: "Before it became an absurdly prolific franchise, Friday the 13th was a cynical, one-off attempt to make a fast buck on a sleazy slasher movie that accidentally ended up spawning a decades-spanning, multimillion-dollar phenomenon... What's most striking about Friday the 13th is how little regard anyone but its fans seem to have for it."

=== Accolades ===
Institution	Year	Category	Recipient	Result	Ref.
AFI's 100 Years... 100 Thrills	2001	America's Most Heart-Pounding Movies	Friday the 13th	Nominated	
Avoriaz Fantastic Film Festival	1981	Grand Prize	Sean S. Cunningham	Nominated	
Golden Raspberry Awards	1981	Worst Picture	Sean S. Cunningham	Nominated	
Golden Raspberry Awards	1981	Worst Supporting Actress	Betsy Palmer	Nominated	
Satellite Awards	2005	Best DVD Extras (Note: Nominated for the documentaries included on the Crystal Lake to Manhattan DVD set.)	Friday the 13th	Nominated	
Saturn Awards	2014	Best DVD/Blu-ray Collection (Note: Nominated for Friday the 13th: The Complete Collection Blu-ray set.)	Friday the 13th	Nominated	

=== Legacy ===
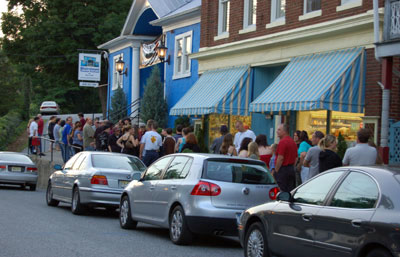
Crowds attending a 2007 revival screening of the film in Blairstown, New Jersey, where filming took place

Contemporary scholars in film criticism, such as Tony Williams, have credited Friday the 13th for initiating the subgenre of the "stalker" or slasher film. Cultural critic Graham Thompson also considers the film as a template, along with John Carpenter's Halloween (1978), that "instigated a rush" of films of its type, in which young people away from supervision are systematically stalked and murdered by a masked villain. The character of Alice has also been noted as a prominent example and "standardization" of the "final girl" trope in slasher films.

While critical reception of the film has been varied in the years since its release, it has attained a significant cult following. In 2017, Complex ranked the film ninth in a list of the best slasher films of all time, while Entertainment Weekly ranked it fourth in a list of twenty-one films compiled in 2024. The same year, Paste magazine ranked it the twenty-fourth best slasher film of all time in a list of fifty films. Also in 2024, Vulture declared it one of the most influential slasher films of all time, noting: "Bloody, shocking, and with a final cliffhanger jump scare, it's no wonder this turned into one of horror's most enduring and successful franchises of all time... Though Friday the 13th draws heavily from slashers that came before it, it does firm up established rules that would later become commonplace—particularly, that premarital sex equals a vicious demise."

Film scholar Matt Hills wrote of the film's legacy: "Friday the 13th has not just been critically positioned as intellectually lacking, it has been othered and devalued in line with the conventional aesthetic norms of the academy and official film culture, said to lack originality and artfulness, to possess no nominated or recognized auteur, and to be grossly sensationalist in its focus on Tom Savini's gory special effects." The film was nominated in 2001 for AFI's 100 Years... 100 Thrills.

Friday the 13th has had multiple revival screenings since its original release: On July 13, 2007, it was screened for the first time on Blairstown's Main Street in the very theater which appears shortly after the opening credits. Overflowing crowds forced the Blairstown Theater Festival, the sponsoring organization, to add an extra screening. A 35th anniversary screening was held in the Griffith Park Zoo as part of the Great Horror Campout on March 13, 2015. In April 2018, Camp No-Be-Bo-Sco, where the film was shot, held Crystal Lake Tours, an event dedicated to the making of the film which brought attendees to nine of the filming locations on the property. The event was attended by actress Adrienne King, who recounted the making of the film to fans. On June 13, 2025, Paramount reissued the film theatrically for one day only in theaters across the United States in celebration of its 45th anniversary.

== Other media ==
=== Sequel and franchise ===
As of 2026, Friday the 13th has spawned ten sequels, including a crossover film with A Nightmare on Elm Street villain Freddy Krueger. Friday the 13th Part 2 introduced Jason Voorhees, the son of Mrs. Voorhees, as the primary antagonist, which would continue for the remaining sequels (with exception of the fifth movie) and related works. Most of the sequels were filmed on larger budgets than the original. For comparison, Friday the 13th had a budget of $550,000, while the first sequel was given a budget of $1.25 million. At the time of its release, Freddy vs. Jason had the largest budget, at $30 million. All of the sequels repeated the premise of the original, so the filmmakers made tweaks to provide freshness. Changes involved an addition to the title—as opposed to a number attached to the end—like "The Final Chapter" and "Jason Takes Manhattan", or filming the movie in 3-D, as Miner did for Friday the 13th Part III (1982). One major addition that would affect the entire film series was the addition of Jason's hockey mask in the third film; this mask would become one of the most recognizable images in popular culture.

A reboot to Friday the 13th was released theatrically in February 2009, with Freddy vs. Jason writers Damian Shannon and Mark Swift hired to script the new film. The film focused on Jason Voorhees, along with his trademark hockey mask. The film was produced by Michael Bay, Andrew Form and Brad Fuller through Bay's production company Platinum Dunes, for New Line Cinema. In November 2007, Marcus Nispel, director of the 2003 remake of The Texas Chainsaw Massacre, was hired to direct. The film had its United States release on February 13, 2009.

=== Novelization ===
In 1987, seven years after the release of the film, Simon Hawke produced a novelization of Friday the 13th. One of the few additions to the book was Mrs. Voorhees begging the Christy family to take her back after the loss of her son; they agreed. Another addition in the novel is more understanding in Mrs. Voorhees' actions. Hawke felt the character had attempted to move on when Jason died, but her psychosis got the best of her. When Steve Christy reopened the camp, Mrs. Voorhees saw it as a chance that what happened to her son could happen again. Her murders were against the counselors, because she saw them all as responsible for Jason's death.

=== Comic and documentary books ===
A number of scenes from the film were recreated in Friday the 13th: Pamela's Tale, a two-issue comic book prequel released by WildStorm in 2007. In 2016, the book On Location in Blairstown: The Making of Friday the 13th was released detailing the planning and filming of the movie.

=== Video games ===
In 2007, Xendex released game-adaptation movie Friday the 13th for mobile phones. In the game, the player plays as Annie Phillips (unlike in the film, she is not killed), one of the counselors at Camp Crystal Lake. While the staff is preparing the camp for its first summer weekend, an "unknown stalker" begins murdering each of them. The player must discover the truth and escape the camp alive.

In 2017, IllFonic and Gun Media released Friday the 13th: The Game, an asymmetrical survival horror game which, though utilizing Jason as the killer, features elements based on the locations of the original film.

=== Prequel series ===
On October 31, 2022, a Friday the 13th prequel streaming series was announced, titled Crystal Lake. It will be written and executive produced by Bryan Fuller and Victor Miller, along with executive producers Marc Toberoff and Rob Barsamian. In January 2023, Adrienne King was cast in a recurring undisclosed role. She previously portrayed Alice Hardy in the 1980 original film and its 1981 sequel. Writing for the series was slated to begin in late January 2023 with Kevin Williamson writing one episode for season one, but production was delayed by the Writers Guild of America strike from May 2 to September 27, and the SAG-AFTRA strike from July 4 to November 9. On May 6, 2024, unconfirmed reports stated that the series was no longer happening. However, the following day, Bloody Disgusting confirmed that the series was still happening, but was going through a retooling process. A24 serves as the studio behind the series and Brad Caleb Kane served as the main series' showrunner. The series premiered on Peacock in October 2026.

== See also ==
- 1980 in film
- List of films featuring psychopaths and sociopaths

== Bibliography ==
- Armstrong, Richard B.; Armstrong, Mary Willems (2015). Encyclopedia of Film Themes, Settings and Series. Jefferson, North Carolina: McFarland & Company. ISBN 978-1-476-61230-0.
- Bracke, Peter (2006). Crystal Lake Memories. London, England: Titan Books. ISBN 978-1-845-76343-5.
- Bracke, Peter; Cunningham, Sean S.; Freda, Bill; King, Adrienne; Miller, Victor; Palmer, Betsy (2009). Friday the 13th (Uncut Version) (Blu-ray audio commentary). Paramount Home Entertainment. OCLC 1230315641.
- Clover, Carol (1993). Men, Women, and Chainsaws: Gender in the Modern Horror Film. Princeton, New Jersey: Princeton University Press. ISBN 978-0-691-00620-8.
- Dimare, Philip C. (2011). Movies in American History: An Encyclopedia. Vol. 1. Santa Barbara, California: ABC-CLIO. ISBN 978-1-598-84296-8.
- Falconer, Peter (2010). "Fresh Meat? Dissecting the Horror Movie Virgin". In McDonald, Tamar Jeffers (ed.). Virgin Territory: Representing Sexual Inexperience in Film. Detroit, Michigan: Wayne State University Press. pp. 123–137. ISBN 978-0-814-33318-1.
- Grove, David (2015). Jamie Lee Curtis: Scream Queen. Albany, Georgia: BearManor Media. ISBN 978-1-59393-608-2. OCLC 840902442.
- Grove, David (2005). Making Friday the 13th: The Legend of Camp Blood. Godalming, England: FAB Press. ISBN 978-1-903-25431-8.
- Harper, Jim (2004). Legacy of Blood: A Comprehensive Guide to Slasher Movies. Manchester, England: Critical Vision. ISBN 978-1-900-48639-2.
- Hawke, Simon (1987). Friday the 13th. New York City, New York: Signet Books. ISBN 978-0-451-15089-9.
- Hills, Matt (2007). "The Friday the 13th Film Series as Other". Sleaze Artists: Cinema at the Margins of Taste, Style, and Politics. Durham, North Carolina: Duke University Press. pp. 219–239. ISBN 978-0-822-39019-0.
- Hogan, David J. (1986). Dark Romance: Sexuality in the Horror Film. Jefferson, North Carolina: McFarland & Company. ISBN 978-0-786-46248-3.
- Kawin, Bruce F. (2012). Horror and the Horror Film. London, England: Anthem Press. ISBN 978-0-857-28241-5.
- Kendrick, James (2009). Hollywood Bloodshed: Violence in 1980s American Cinema. Carbondale, Illinois: Southern Illinois University Press. ISBN 978-0-809-32888-8.
- Kendrick, James (2017). "Slasher Films and Gore in the 1980s". In Benshoff, Harry M. (ed.). A Companion to the Horror Film. Hoboken, New Jersey: John Wiley & Sons. pp. 310–328. ISBN 978-1-119-33501-6.
- Maltin, Leonard (2000). Leonard Maltin's Movie Guide. New York City, New York: Signet Books. ISBN 978-0-451-19837-2.
- Krone, Kassia (2024). Hollywood's Monstrous Moms: Vilifying Mental Illness in Horror Films. Jefferson, North Carolina: McFarland & Company. ISBN 978-1-476-68893-0.
- Larson, Randall D. (1985). Musique Fantastique: A Survey of Film Music in the Fantastic Cinema. Metuchen, New Jersey: Scarecrow Press. ISBN 978-0-810-81728-9.
- McCarty, John (1984). Splatter Movies: Breaking the Last Taboo of the Screen. New York City, New York: St. Martin's Press. ISBN 978-0-312-75257-6.
- Norman, Jason (2014). Welcome to Our Nightmares: Behind the Scene with Today's Horror Actors. Jefferson, North Carolina: McFarland & Company. ISBN 978-0-786-47986-3.
- Nowell, Richard (2010). Blood Money: A History of the First Teen Slasher Film Cycle. London, England: Bloomsbury. ISBN 978-1-441-12496-8.
- Petridis, Sotiris (2019). Anatomy of the Slasher Film: A Theoretical Analysis. Jefferson, North Carolina: McFarland & Company. ISBN 978-1-476-63567-5.
- Rockoff, Adam (2002). Going to Pieces: The Rise and Fall of the Slasher Film. Jefferson, North Carolina: McFarland & Company. ISBN 978-0-786-41227-3.
- Robinson, Jessica (2012). Life Lessons from Slasher Films. Lanham, Maryland: Scarecrow Press. ISBN 978-0-810-88502-8.
- Shapiro, Marc (June 1989). "The Women of Crystal Lake: Part One". Fangoria. No. 83. pp. 18–21. ISSN 0164-2111. Archived from the original on October 24, 2023.
- Shary, Timothy (2012). Teen Movies: American Youth on Screen. New York City, New York: Columbia University Press. ISBN 978-0-231-50160-6.
- Thompson, Graham (2007). American Culture in the 1980s. Edinburgh, Scotland: Edinburgh University Press. ISBN 978-0-748-62895-7.
- Wardinski, Nathan (2024). Dissecting Cannibal Holocaust. Lanham, Maryland: Lexington Books. ISBN 978-1-666-91403-0.
- Williams, Tony (2015). Hearths of Darkness: The Family in the American Horror Film (Revised ed.). Jackson, Mississippi: University Press of Mississippi. ISBN 978-1-628-46107-7.
