= I Am Anne Frank =

I Am Anne Frank may refer to:

- I Am Anne Frank (musical), a 1996 American musical
- I Am Anne Frank (American Horror Story), a two-part episode of the FX anthology television series American Horror Story, aired November 2012
