= Erik Marcisak =

American comedian

Erik Marcisak (pronounced "Mar-See-Sack") was born on March 17, 1978, in Queens, New York. He is an American writer, sketch comedy producer, and actor. Marcisak was named one of Back Stage’s Top Ten "Comedy Best Bets" in 2005 for producing the controversial sketch comedy show Saturday Night Rewritten which used the previous night's Saturday Night Live as a creative jumping-off point for an entirely new sketch show that was written, rehearsed, and performed within 8 hours the next day. Saturday Night Rewritten ran in New York City from 2003-2006.

From 2002 to 2004, Marcisak ran Above Kleptomania, a theater company devoted to improv and sketch comedy shows. He and his associate producer Joe Guercio produced more than 700 performances. Above Kleptomania was named by Time Out New York Magazine in their “Best of 2003” issue as “best local development in comedy.”

From 2004 to 2006, Marcisak produced & managed the theater company known as Juvie Hall. He produced and helped create several shows such as Sara Schaefer Is Obsessed With You, The Midnight Kalan, and Saturday Night Rewritten. Some comedic writers and performers who did shows at Juvie Hall included Sara Schaefer, Elliott Kalan, Brock Mahan, Amanda Melson, Dan McCoy, and Rick Younger. Juvie Hall received an Emerging Comics of New York Award for "Best Venue" in 2005.

In 2004, Marcisak was the talent coordinator for the Bass Ale Red Triangle Comedy Tour. He was in charge of their national search for the best improv and sketch comedy teams in San Francisco, Los Angeles, Chicago, Atlanta, Boston, and New York City.

In 2006, at the Toronto International Film Festival it was revealed that Erik Marcisak played the role of Eric Rost, a fictional filmmaker in the JT Petty film S&MAN. The other interview subjects in the mostly-true horror "documentary" were identified accurately. Many early reviews of the film treated Erik Rost as a real person, and not a character.

Since 2006, Marcisak has been a writer in the video game industry.
