= S&Man =

2006 pseudo-documentary film by J. T. Petty

S&Man.
- Directed by: J. T. Petty
- Screenplay by: J. T. Petty
- Produced by: Jason Kliot; Lawrence Mattis; Joan Vicente
- Starring: Carol J. Clover; Debbie D Michelle Glick; Bob Steenburgh; Erik Marcisak
- Cinematography: Patrick McGraw
- Edited by: Andy Grieve
- Music by: On Filmore; Darin Gray; Glenn Kotche
- Production company: HDNet Films
- Distributed by: Magnolia Pictures
- Release date: 10 March 2006 (South by Southwest Film Festival)
- Running time: 84 minutes
- Country: United States
- Language: English

S&Man (pronounced Sandman) is a 2006 American pseudo-documentary film that examines the underground subculture of horror films. It contains interviews with filmmakers and other participants in the low budget indie horror scene, as well as film professor and author Carol J. Clover. The second half of the film also features a scripted plot, which stars comedian Erik Marcisak as the fictional filmmaker Eric Rost.

The film discusses why some people enjoy underground horror films involving fetishes. Although the film is presented as a documentary, it has a fictional subplot in addition to its nonfiction elements.

S&Man was shown at the reRun Gastropub Theater in New York City, film festivals, and released on home video.

== Summary ==
Director J.T. Petty interviews Carol J. Clover, exploitation film actress Debbie D. (along with Debbie's husband and a sexologist), and the underground horror directors Bill Zebub and Fred Vogel. These interviews are interspersed with clips from various horror films. The character of Eric Rost is also introduced, presented as an additional real-life filmmaker being interviewed.

In the fictional subplot of the film, Petty (playing himself) begins to suspect that Eric Rost is not a horror director but a producer of unsimulated snuff films. Fictional clips from Rost's films, the titular S&Man video series, are shown. They are all shot in the first person and contain no dialogue. Rost refuses to give Petty the contact information of any of the actresses who appear in his films, and Rost is shown spying extensively on women he considers for roles. It ultimately remains ambiguous whether or not Rost's films depict real-life violence.

== Interviewees ==
- Bill Zebub – A veteran director of low-budget horror exploitation films.
- Fred Vogel – The head of Toetag Pictures. He began his career as a special effects artist and later directed August Underground and August Underground's Mordum.
- Debbie D. – An actress who stars in low-budget horror exploitation films; she is interviewed along with a sexologist and her husband, a forensic psychologist.
- Carol J. Clover – Film professor and author of Men, Women, and Chainsaws: Gender in Modern Horror.

== Cast ==
- J.T. Petty as himself.
- Erik Marcisak as Eric Rost.

== Production ==
We have to react to real violence and real snuff footage all the time, news channels show decapitations and bodies dragged in the streets.

— J. T. Petty

S&Man's director J. T. Petty originally intended the film to focus on a man who lived near his childhood home; the man often spied on, and filmed, his neighbors. The footage led to an indictment towards "the peeper", who recorded 191 videotapes of Petty's childhood neighborhood. The indictment implied the footage should be viewed in court, but the people in the neighborhood opposed this owing to privacy concerns. Petty said of the 191 videotapes, "I admired the peeping tom; he had made movies that were frightening and titillating and real." The idea of using a camera to record his neighbor's house for hours fascinated him so much that he decided to direct a film about it. Although he had already secured funding, Petty was left without a subject since "the peeper" wanted nothing to do with the film. Petty decided to focus on three directors, who did not direct films aimed at the general public; they directed simulated snuff films, involving murder and sexual assault. Petty found the directors — Zebub, Vogel, and Marcisak, Petty's friend who played the fictional director Rost — at the Chiller Convention, an underground horror event.

== Release ==
=== Film festivals and theater ===
S&Man premiered in the Toronto International Film Festival's "Midnight Madness", a section which features a variety of films from new directors, in 2006. Twitch Film reported that the film's release at the Toronto International Film Festival caused controversy both offline and online, but TMZ reported that the film was popular at the festival. It was shown again at South by Southwest in Austin, Texas, in 2006, and UnionDocs in Brooklyn, New York, in 2009. S&Man had a theatrical release at the reRun Gastropub Theater in New York City in 2010.

=== Home video ===
The DVD and Blu-ray of the film were released on 12 October 2010. The DVD and Blu-ray releases both include deleted scenes, other unused material, and two commentary tracks (one featuring Petty and Marcisak, the other featuring Zebub).

=== Reception ===
Jeannette Catsoulis of The New York Times called the film "a queasy glimpse into bargain-basement sleaze," but also praised it as "cleverly executed". Nick Schager of The Village Voice criticized the pseudo-documentary conceit as "a transparent and uninformative gimmick". Meg Hewings of Hour Community reviewed the film negatively overall, describing it as "puzzling" and "somewhat pointless". Joe Leydon of Variety described the film as an "uncomfortably close look at underground horror" and speculated that the film "could scare up a cult following on the midnight screening circuit".
