= Mark Nelson (actor) =

American actor, director, and teacher

- Born: September 26, 1955 (age 71); U.S.
- Occupations: Actor, director, teacher

Mark Nelson (born September 26, 1955) is an American actor, director, and teacher.

== Biography ==
Nelson grew up in Westwood, New Jersey, in a Jewish family. Nelson graduated from the Horace Mann School before attending Princeton University, graduating in 1977. He later studied acting under Uta Hagen.

Nelson made his feature film debut in the slasher film Friday the 13th (1980). He appeared on Broadway in Angels in America, The Invention of Love, After the Fall, and Three Sisters at Roundabout Theatre Company, and the original casts of A Few Good Men, Rumors, Biloxi Blues, and Amadeus. For his performance as Einstein in Steve Martin's Picasso at the Lapin Agile, he received the Obie, Drama League, Carbonell, and San Francisco Critics Awards. He played Herr Schultz in the 2016 national tour of Cabaret and acted off-Broadway in My Name is Asher Lev for which he received a Lortel nomination.

Other roles include Shylock in The Merchant of Venice at The Shakespeare Theater, Uncle Vanya (in Bartlett Sher's production at the Intiman Theatre), Matt in Talley's Folly (Berkshire Theatre Festival), Bluntschli in Arms and the Man (Long Wharf Theatre) and two solo pieces: I Am My Own Wife by Doug Wright (Carbonell Award) and Underneath the Lintel by Glen Berger (Connecticut Critics Award).

His TV work includes roles on Unforgettable, Law & Order, and Spin City. He teaches acting at Princeton University, Circle in the Square Theatre School, and at New York City's HB Studio. He has directed at Manhattan Theatre Club, Drama Dept., McCarter Theatre, George Street Playhouse, Chautauqua Theatre Company, and is a frequent guest director at the Juilliard School.

In 2013, he received a Lunt-Fontanne Fellowship.

== Filmography ==
=== Film ===
Year	Title	Role	Notes
1980	Friday the 13th	Ned Rubenstein	
1981	The Chosen	Fighting Student	
1989	Bloodhounds of Broadway	Sam the Skate	
1993	The Seventh Coin	Librarian	
1996	The First Wives Club	Eric Loest	
2014	The Rewrite	Josh	
2019	Lingua Franca	Roman	
2024	The Evil Three	Darryl Wells	Short film

=== Television ===
Year	Title	Role	Notes
1985	Remington Steele	Lino	Episode: "Gourmet Steele"
1991	Thirtysomething	Leonard Katz	Episode: "Melissa and Men"
1996	Law & Order	Stein	Episode: "Custody"
1997	Liberty! The American Revolution	Loyalist	Episode: "Are We to Be a Nation? (1783-1788)"
1998	Suddenly Susan	Paul	Episode: "Not in This Life"
1998–2000	Spin City	Therapist	4 episodes
1999	Law & Order: Special Victims Unit	Robert Stevens	Episode: "Payback"
1999	Now and Again	Doctor	Episode: "A Girl's Life"
2000	Law & Order	Julius Reinhard	Episode: "High & Low"
2002	Law & Order: Criminal Intent	Mancuso	Episode: "Badge"
2002	Ed	Sid Pennington	Episode: "Neighbors"
2004	Law & Order	Dr. Stuart Barton	Episode: "Cut"
2007	American Experience	Nathaniel Pendleton	Episode: "Alexander Hamilton"
2010	Law & Order	Symposium Organizer	Episode: "Brazil"
2013	Unforgettable	Dr. Eugene Lustig	Episode: "Memory Kings"
2014	The Good Wife	Principal Adam Englehardt	Episode: "The Trial"
2022	Julia	Dr. Greenberg	Episode: "Foie Gras"
2026	Crystal Lake	Dick Wagner	Cameo; episode: "Kill Them, Mommy"
