= The Flop House =

Comedy and film podcast

Presentation
- Hosted by: Dan McCoy; Stuart Wellington; Elliott Kalan; Simon Fisher (former)
- Genre: Comedy; film
- Language: English
- Updates: Weekly
- Length: 60–90 minutes

Production
- No. of episodes: 604 (including 446 "main" episodes, 34 "Movie Minutes" and 124 "FH Minis")

Publication
- Original release: September 7, 2007
- Provider: Maximum Fun

The Flop House is a comedy podcast about films that flop, either commercially or critically, produced every two weeks. It is made in Brooklyn, New York and hosted by Dan McCoy, Stuart Wellington, and Elliott Kalan. Each episode focuses on a specific bad movie, a film noted for being a critical or commercial failure.

== Reception ==
The Flop House has received praise from The New York Times, The A.V. Club, Parade Magazine, and The Guardian, with the BBC noting that the podcast "has grown to command a large audience." Slate listed the 2012 episode about Tango & Cash as one of "the 25 Best Podcast Episodes Ever".

== Background ==
The first episode of The Flop House was released in September 2007 and featured McCoy, Wellington, and original co-host Simon Fisher discussing the 2005 film Stealth. Following Fisher's departure from the show, Kalan became a permanent co-host in early 2008. The podcast has featured a guest host on several episodes, including multiple appearances by The Daily Show writer Hallie Haglund.

The Flop House was an independent production for several years before joining the All Things Comedy podcasting network in October 2012. The podcast then moved to the Maximum Fun network in September 2014.

Performing live as The Flop House, McCoy, Wellington, and Kalan co-hosted, along with the editors of film zine I Love Bad Movies, a series of bad movie screenings at 92YTribeca in New York City from June 2011 until the venue's closing in June 2013. They have since hosted a series of "Flop Night" screenings along with the editors of I Love Bad Movies at the Alamo Drafthouse Cinema in Yonkers, New York.

In September 2014, it was announced McCoy, Wellington, and Kalan would cumulatively write a forty-page Flash Gordon Holiday Special comic book to be released in December 2014.

Through its history, guests featured on the podcast have included film critic Alonso Duralde, author Linda Holmes, radio producer Roman Mars, comedian Zhubin Parang, and author Gillian Flynn.

== See also ==
- My Year of Flops - similar in content
- RiffTrax
