= Elliott Kalan =

American comedian (born 1981)

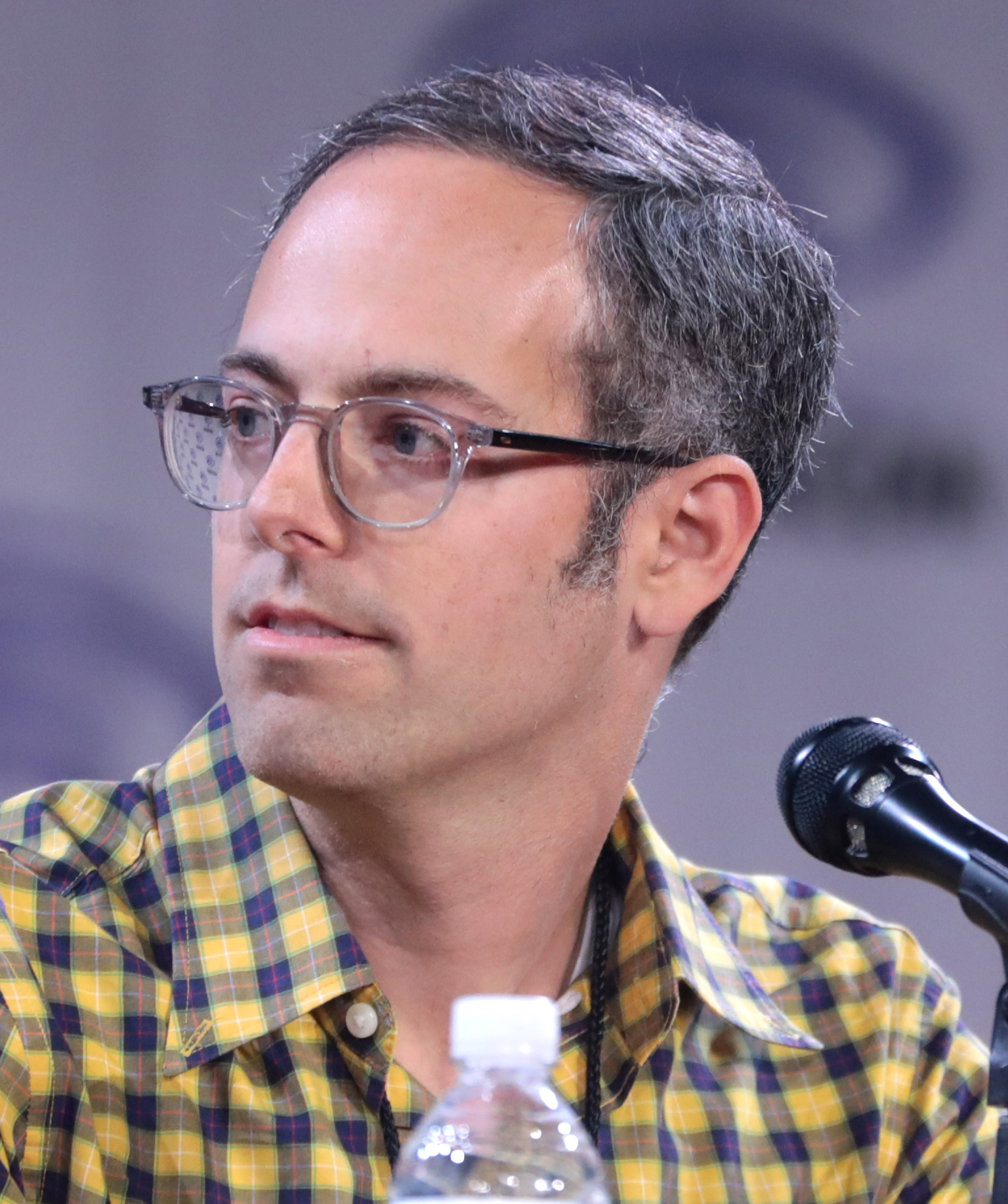
- Kalan at the 2023 WonderCon
- Born: December 3, 1981 (age 44)
- Education: New York University
- Occupations: Writer; comedian

Elliott Charles Kalan (born December 3, 1981) is an American comedian, podcaster, and writer. He was writer and head writer for The Daily Show with Jon Stewart from 2008 to 2014 and writer and head writer for Mystery Science Theater 3000 from 2017 to 2018. He is a co-host of the podcast The Flop House.

== Early life ==
Kalan grew up in Millburn, New Jersey and graduated from Millburn High School as part of the class of 1999. He attended the New York University Tisch School of the Arts, where he majored in screenwriting at the Rita & Burton Goldberg Department of Dramatic Writing.

== Comedy career ==
Elliott Kalan began his career at The Daily Show as a production assistant in 2003 before moving up to producer, staff writer, and ultimately head writer.

Kalan was co-founder of comedy group The Hypocrites with fellow television writer Brock Mahan. He also hosted a live talk and variety stage show, The Primetime Kalan (originally The Midnight Kalan and later The New Kalan Show). The show was created by Kalan, producer Erik Marcisak, and director Joe Guercio, and written and performed by Kalan, Marcisak, and Dan McCoy. Many of Kalan's The Daily Show co-workers appeared on the show, including Stephen Colbert, Samantha Bee, and Rob Corddry.

Kalan occasionally appeared in bit parts on The Daily Show and provided voice-over narration for "The Decider" comic-book segments. He was instrumental in putting together the "gay cowboy" montage (a comedic series of clips from classic westerns, illustrating that the gay content in Brokeback Mountain is nothing new), when Jon Stewart hosted the 78th Academy Awards. Along with the writing staff of The Daily Show with Jon Stewart, Kalan has won four Primetime Emmy Awards.

From 2006 to 2009, Kalan wrote a weekly column for the free morning daily Metro. Following a column he wrote in the August 3, 2007 issue of the Metro, Kalan was fired for writing a self-deprecating joke about the increasing obsolescence of the newspaper industry. This was followed by a brief article in New York Magazine on August 20, 2007, about the incident, which was heavily publicized on internet blogs including Media Bistro, Huffington Post, and Gawker. Many blog postings about the incident imply that the Metro violated basic principles of journalism and freedom of expression in firing Kalan. Perhaps as a result of this publicity, he was later re-hired. In 2009, he left the Metro of his own accord, saying "Why leave now? It just feels like the right time for me to move on creatively. Or I’m going undercover to deliver Osama bin Laden to justice. Pick whichever reason sounds cooler."

Kalan also performs as a stand-up comic, and in 2013 performed several USO shows in Afghanistan along with John Oliver, Rory Albanese, and Adam Lowitt.

In August 2015 Kalan announced that he had left his position as head writer for The Daily Show. In May 2016, it was announced he was joining the writing staff of the Mystery Science Theater 3000 revival as head writer.

On April 14, 2017, Kalan appeared on Episode 1103 of the Netflix production of Mystery Science Theater 3000 along with series creator Joel Hodgson. The two portrayed characters in a "host segment" of that episode's source film, The Time Travelers.

Kalan was a contestant on the January 25, 2021 episode of Jeopardy!. He came in second place.

== Podcasting ==
Along with comedians Dan McCoy and Stuart Wellington, Kalan co-hosts The Flop House podcast, on which the hosts discuss and mock major movies that were either commercial or critical "flops", such as Gamer and All About Steve. One supplemental episode of the Flop House, in which Kalan improvised a rapid-fire pitch for a film based on the comic Ziggy became a minor viral Internet success after being posted on Gawker. Dan McCoy and Kalan have also been published in comedy magazine Whim Quarterly and film zine I Love Bad Movies.

Kalan is also the co-host of the Audible podcast Presidents Are People Too!, along with American historian Alexis Coe. The podcast examines the life and times of the presidents of the United States.

In 2024, Kalan co-hosted a year-long series on the podcast 99 Percent Invisible, taking the audience through the Pulitzer Prize winning book The Power Broker by Robert Caro about American urban planner and public official Robert Moses.

== Film criticism ==
From early 2009 until April 2012, Kalan hosted the screening series Closely Watched Films at 92YTribeca. These events commonly featured the screening of a rare older film followed by a discussion between Kalan and a celebrity guest who had not previously seen the film.

== Comic book writing ==
Kalan is a comic book writer; among other titles, he wrote the six-issue limited series Spider-Man and the X-Men. An exchange of dialogue between the characters Spider-Man and Sauron, where Sauron stated his intent to transform humans into dinosaurs, became a popular Internet meme.

== Personal life ==
Kalan lives in Los Angeles, California with his wife Danielle and their sons. He has a twin sister and a brother.
