= Laurie Bartram =

American actress (1958–2007)

- Born: Laurie Lee Bartram; May 16, 1958; St. Louis, Missouri, U.S.
- Died: May 25, 2007 (aged 49); Lynchburg, Virginia, U.S.
- Other name: Laurie Brighton
- Occupations: Actress; ballet dancer
- Years active: 1973–2007
- Spouse: Gregory McCauley (?–2007)
- Children: 5

Laurie Lee Bartram (May 16, 1958 – May 25, 2007) was an American actress and ballet dancer best known for her role as "Brenda" in the 1980 landmark slasher film Friday the 13th.

== Career ==
Bartram was an actress and ballet dancer. She is perhaps best known for her role as the camp counselor Brenda in the original film Friday the 13th, a performance where she was praised as one of the more "likeable" characters in the film. Bartram also appeared in the soap opera Another World as recurring character Karen Campbell, and in two episodes of the 1972 TV series Emergency!, although she was credited as "Laurie Brighton". She also had an uncredited appearance in the 1974 horror film The House of Seven Corpses as Debbie.

After Friday the 13th, Bartram directed and choreographed local theater productions, made costumes for numerous productions and did voice work for local businesses including WSET in Lynchburg, Virginia. She also did numerous local commercials and billboards.

== Personal life ==
After leaving the entertainment industry in the early 1980s, Bartram became a born again Christian and decided to pursue an education. She attended Liberty Baptist College (now Liberty University), where she met her future husband, Gregory McCauley. The couple had five children, named Lauren, Scott, Jordan, Francis, and Isabelle, all of whom were home-schooled. Bartram resided in Tacoma, Washington, and later in Lynchburg, Virginia, where she lived at the time of her death.

== Death ==
Bartram died from pancreatic cancer on May 25, 2007, nine days after her forty-ninth birthday. The documentary His Name Was Jason: 30 Years of Friday the 13th was dedicated to her memory, as well as several other deceased cast and crew members.

== Filmography ==
Year	Title	Role	Notes
1973	Emergency!	Karen / Jill	2 episodes
1974	The House of Seven Corpses	Debbie	Uncredited
1978–1979	Another World	Karen Campbell	Television series
1980	Friday the 13th	Brenda Jones	
