= Blairstown Theater Festival =

Former film festival in Blairstown, New Jersey

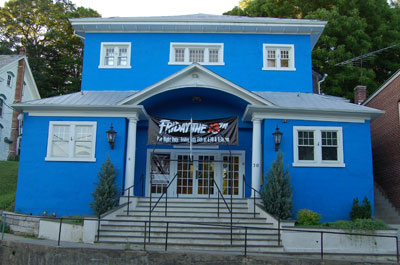
Blairstown's Roy's Hall, built in 1913.

The Blairstown Theater Festival operated from December 2006 through November 2007 at historic Roy's Hall (also known as Roy's Theatre), a former silent movie theater built in 1913 at 30 Main Street in Blairstown, New Jersey.

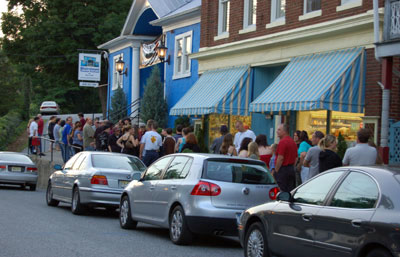
Crowds awaiting a screening of Friday the 13th on July 13, 2007.

On July 13, 2007, the company attracted considerable media attention when they presented three screenings of the classic horror film, Friday the 13th, which was shot in and around Blairstown in the fall of 1979. Roy's Hall appears in the film shortly after the opening credits.

The company's January 2007 production of Letters from the Inside was selected by The Star-Ledger as one of the top five new plays of the 2006–2007 New Jersey theater season and actress Kelli Ambrose, who played Mandy in Letters from the Inside, was selected as one of the top five Best Leading Actresses in a Play.

Among the other concerts and productions presented by the Blairstown Theater Festival were Nancy Anderson singing early Broadway songs backed by the Baroque Orchestra of North Jersey (Baroque to Broadway), the Still River Band in Concert, Malachy McCourt and Jarlath Conroy in A Couple of Blaguards, Betsy Palmer and Will Hutchins in A.R. Gurney's Love Letters, the New Jersey premiere of I Am Anne Frank, and concerts by cabaret performers KT Sullivan (Vienna to Weimar), John O'Neil ('So Kaye), the Western Wind Vocal Ensemble (Holiday Light), Cris Groenendaal (Music of the Night), Jana Robbins (One Hell of a Ride! The Songs of Cy Coleman) and jazz pianist Bill Mays and his Inventions Trio.

The company also presented several film festivals with such classic titles as Gone with the Wind, Casablanca, Seven Samurai, Abbott and Costello Meet Frankenstein, A Night at the Opera, The Court Jester, La Belle et la Bête, Black Orpheus, Mon Oncle, The Wages of Fear and La Strada.

The Blairstown Theater Festival was not able to continue past its first season for several reasons. Most significantly, Blairstown Township suddenly increased the real estate taxes on the building by more than 680% (from $1,031.55 to $7,032.30) and the landlord decided to sell the theatre.

A CD featuring highlights from the Blairstown Theater Festival's season was released in February 2008.

== 2007 Audio Sampler ==
- Hellertown Still River Band
- A Little Attila (Tamerlan) KT Sullivan with Jed Distler, piano
- Grandpa's Spells Bill Mays
- Zip Jana Robbins with Doyle Newmeyer, piano
- Carnegie Hall and Moon Landing Malachy McCourt and Jarlath Conroy
- Too Many Miles From Broadway Nancy Anderson with the Baroque Orchestra of North Jersey, Robert W. Butts, Musical Director
- Ballin' the Jack John O'Neil with David Wolfson, piano
- Phil the Fluter's Ball Jarlath Conroy
- Merry Little Minuet Still River Band
- I Am a Vamp KT Sullivan with Jed Distler, piano
- Co-Dependent With You Cris Groenendaal with Sue Anderson, piano
- Old Dusty Road Still River Band
- Old Fashioned Girl Nancy Anderson with the Baroque Orchestra of North Jersey
- Medley: You Can Always Count On Me / Nobody Does It Like Me Jana Robbins with Doyle Newmeyer, piano
- Letters from the Inside (Excerpt) Kelli Ambrose as Mandy
- Music of the Night (from The Phantom of the Opera) Cris Groenendaal with Sue Anderson, piano
- The Cherry Tree Carol The Western Wind Vocal Ensemble
- I Remember (from I Am Anne Frank) Jenny Rose Baker & Danny Rothman with the Baroque Orchestra of North Jersey
- Tango Moonlight Duo (Katherine Hoover)
- Mozart: Piano Concerto #23 – Third Movement The Baroque Orchestra of North Jersey featuring Sohyun Ahn, piano
- Tchaikovsky (and Other Russians) John O'Neil and Robert Armin with David Wolfson, piano

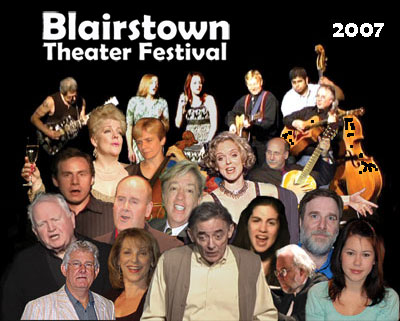
Performers at the 2007 Blairstown Theater Festival. Credit: Robert Armin
