= Joshua Clover =

American journalist (1962–2025)

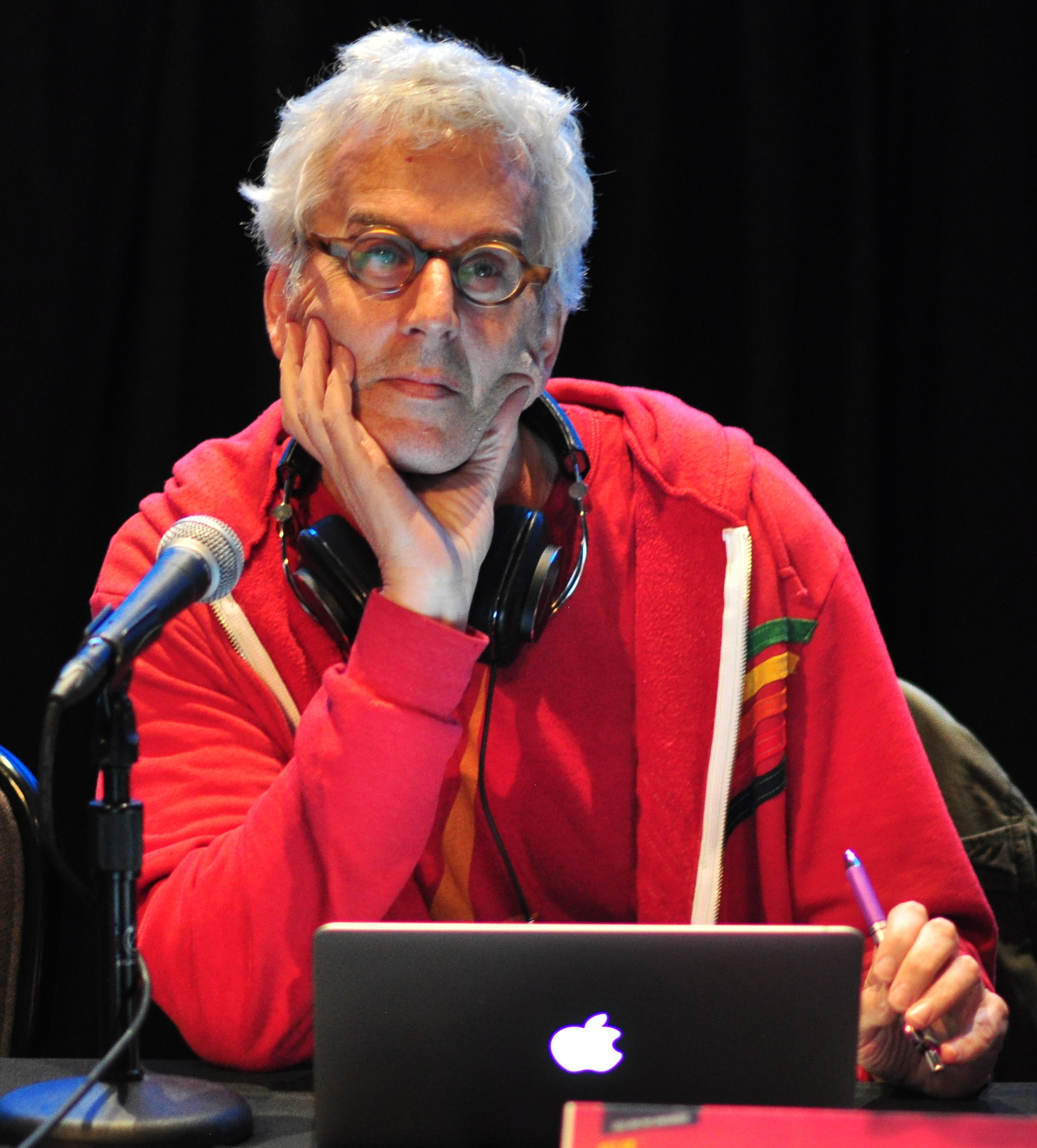
- Clover in 2015
- Born: Joshua Miller Kaplan; December 30, 1962; San Francisco, California, U.S.
- Died: April 26, 2025 (aged 62)
- Education: Boston University; Iowa Writers' Workshop
- Mother: Carol J. Clover
- Writing career
- Language: English
- Genres: Scholarship, poetry
- Notable works: Riot.Strike.Riot: The New Era of Uprisings, Madonna anno domini

Joshua Clover (December 30, 1962 – April 26, 2025) was an American poet, writer, and professor of English and comparative literature at the University of California, Davis.

Clover was a published scholar, poet, critic, and journalist whose work has been translated into more than a dozen languages; his scholarship on the political economy of riots has been widely influential in political theory. He appeared in three editions of The Best American Poetry and two times in Best Music Writing, and received an individual grant from the NEA as well as fellowships from the Cornell Society for the Humanities, the University of California Humanities Research Institute, and Institute of Advanced Study, University of Warwick. His first book of poetry, Madonna anno domini, received the Walt Whitman Award from the Academy of American Poets in 1996, selected by Jorie Graham.

== Background ==
Born in San Francisco, California, a graduate of Boston University and the Iowa Writers' Workshop, Clover was a professor of English Literature and Comparative Literature at the University of California, Davis, and was the distinguished Holloway poet-in-residence at the University of California, Berkeley in 2002–2003.

Clover's given name at birth was Joshua Miller Kaplan, but via legal change he took his mother's maiden name. He has a sister named Greta. His mother, Carol J. Clover, is the originator of the final girl theory in a book on horror films and a professor emerita at the University of California, Berkeley.

Clover died on April 26, 2025, at the age of 62. The Marxist Institute for Research announced his death.

== Scholarship ==
Clover's scholarly books in addition to many articles and book chapters have all in various ways considered changes to daily life, work, politics, and social struggle since the Sixties. Originally studying poetry, music, and film, he focused since the 2008 economic crisis directly on political-economic matters. Basic concerns include the array of changes wrought by deindustrialization in the west, the decline of the United States empire and the future of global capitalism. Particular focuses run from the rise of office work to the nature of financialization, from the world after the end of the Soviet project to the transformations of social movements, all considered within the framework of Marxist value theory, with a particular interest in racialized regimes of power and struggle against state and capital. Riot.Strike.Riot: the New Era of Uprisings, a widely cited study translated into five languages other than English, "offers a decidedly materialist theory of the riot and sketches a unique history of the return of the riot to the center of social struggles"; the Chicago Tribune called it "timely and audacious."

In addition to his scholarship he was a journalist since the Nineties. He contributed columns, often on popular culture and politics, to various journals, including the column "Pop and Circumstance" for The Nation and "Marx and Coca-Cola" for Film Quarterly. He was a senior writer and editor at The Village Voice and Spin. He contributed to The New York Times, the Los Angeles Review of Books, and many other venues, sometimes under the name "Jane Dark."

== Poetry ==
Clover published three volumes of poetry in addition to shorter works for which he won various prizes and fellowships; poems have been anthologized in multiple volumes and languages, including the Norton Introduction to Literature (10th edition, 2009). His poetry often concerns the life of great cities and the twilight character of late modernity, particularly the way it is entangled with the products of overdeveloped capitalism (especially the pleasures of popular music) and how we will have to forsake all of those pleasures for our freedom. Judith Butler has written, regarding The Totality for Kids (2006), that "In this brilliant volume, the fragmented world of a late and lost modernity has its own moving and lucid affect, its forms of aliveness." Increasingly his work concerned direct political struggle; as one reviewer noted, "Few books, let alone books of poetry, arrive boasting a blurb from Entertainment Weekly while simultaneously, and aggressively, declaring the attempt to establish a Marxist lyric praxis." Clover has also translated poetry from the Dutch and French, including the book Tarnac: A Preparatory Act, by Jean-Marie Gleize.

He was a co-founder, along with Jasper Bernes and Juliana Spahr, of the poetry press Commune Editions. In 2020, the press was awarded the American Book Award as the best publisher in the United States.

== Political work ==
Clover wrote extensively about the campus movements against tuition increases and student debt, about the Occupy movement, and about free speech and policing both on and off the university campus. In January 2012, he and eleven students at the University of California, Davis, engaged in a sit-in to protest the financial arrangements between U.S. Bank and the university, permanently closing the bank branch along with ending the university's particular arrangements with the bank. The protesters, who became known as the "Davis Dozen," were charged with "obstructing movement in a public place and conspiracy to commit a misdemeanor." One month before the trial was scheduled to begin, the Davis Dozen accepted a plea deal from the Yolo County District Attorney. Under the terms of that agreement, the protesters received an infraction notice ticket and agreed to perform 80 hours of community service.

== Controversy ==
Nick Irvin, in a February 2019 opinion piece for The California Aggie, drew attention to published comments by Clover suggesting he was in favor of killing police. Among them was the September 2015 SFWeekly interview statement by Clover: "People think that cops need to be reformed. They need to be killed." Clover also was reported by CBS Sacramento to have tweeted in November 2014 "I am thankful that every living cop will one day be dead, some by their own hand, some by others, too many of old age", and in December of that year "it’s easier to shoot cops when their backs are turned".

In response to all media requests for comment, Clover said only, "On the day that police have as much to fear from literature professors as Black kids do from police, I will definitely have a statement. Until then, I have nothing further to add." In March 2019 California State Assemblyman James Gallagher gathered over 10,000 signatures on a petition calling for Clover to be fired. UC Davis Chancellor Gary May replied in a letter to Gallagher that "Professor Clover’s statements, although offensive and abhorrent, do not meet the legal requirement for 'true threats' that might exempt them from First Amendment protection. . . . Accordingly, the university will not proceed with review or investigation of concerns regarding Professor Clover’s public statements."

== Books ==
- Madonna anno domini: Poems. Louisiana State University Press. January 1, 1997. ISBN 978-0-8071-2147-4.
- The Matrix (British Film Institute, 2004), 128 pp.
- The Totality for Kids. University of California Press. 2006. ISBN 978-0-520-24599-0.
- 1989: Bob Dylan Didn't Have This to Sing About. University of California Press. October 7, 2009. ISBN 978-0-520-94464-0.
- Red Epic. Commune Editions, Oakland 2015 ISBN 978-1934639160
- Riot. Strike. Riot: The New Era of Uprisings. Verso, London & Brooklyn 2016 ISBN 1784780596
- Roadrunner. Duke University Press, Durham 2021.
