= Stuart Wellington =

- Born: Stuart Lenton Wellington; February 26, 1980 (age 46)
- Occupations: Comedian; podcaster; bartender; bar proprietor
- Years active: 2007–present
- Known for: The Flop House; Psycho Goreman
- Spouse: Sharlene Wellington

Stuart Lenton Wellington (born February 26, 1980) is an American comedian and bar proprietor based in Brooklyn, New York. With Dan McCoy, he is a co-creator of the bad-movie podcast The Flop House, which he has co-hosted since 2007 with McCoy and Elliott Kalan, moving to the All Things Comedy podcast network in October 2012 and then the Maximum Fun network in September 2014. He has been featured in The A.V. Club's Podmass column for his work on the podcast.

In addition to appearing on the Flop House, Wellington also co-hosts Till Def do us Ppardy, along with Alexander Smith, an educational Def Leppard podcast which explores themes in Def Leppard's music.

Wellington is the creator of the Flop House Housecat character and vocalist of a biographical song, produced by musician Alexander Smith, detailing the character's back story. He was a co-host of the live "Bad Movie Night" screening series at 92YTribeca in New York City, which included a sold-out showing of Bratz: The Movie in December 2012.

Wellington voiced character Tube Man in the Steven Kotanski movie Psycho Goreman, which was released in 2020.

With his wife, Sharlene, Wellington is also a co-owner of the Hinterlands Bar in Brooklyn, New York, that opened for business in mid-June 2016.

He appeared in three episodes of Hello from the Magic Tavern as Globulous the Beholder.
