= Jeannine Taylor =

American actress

- Born: June 2, 1954 (age 72); Hartford, Connecticut, U.S.
- Other name: Jeannine McConnell
- Education: Wheaton College
- Occupation: Actress
- Spouse: James McConnell (m. 1990)

Jeannine Alice Taylor (born June 2, 1954) is an American film, stage, and television actress. She is best known for her role as Marcie in Sean S. Cunningham's 1980 horror film Friday the 13th. From 1980 to 1981, Taylor portrayed the lead, Madame Trentoni / Aurelia Johnson, in Robert Kalfin's Off-Broadway production Hijinks! and has had roles in several stage productions including Jenny in The Umbrellas of Cherbourg (1979) and Henrietta in Robert and Elizabeth (1984).

== Life and career ==
=== Early life ===
Taylor was born on June 2, 1954, in Hartford, Connecticut. Her mother, Diane (née Coperthwaite) was from Fort Myers, Florida. Taylor graduated from Wheaton College, a Christian liberal arts college in Wheaton, Illinois.

=== Film and theater career ===
In 1979, Taylor portrayed Jenny in the stage adaption of The Umbrellas of Cherbourg. The production was met with positive reviews. Linda in Cy Coleman's musical Home Again, Home Again. The production opened at the American Shakespeare Theatre in Stratford, Connecticut, on March 10 and lasted until March 17. It subsequently opened at the Royal Alexandra Theatre in Toronto, Ontario, Canada on March 19 and lasted until April 14. The musical was scheduled to open at the Mark Hellinger Theatre on April 26 but was cancelled at the cost of $1,250,000.

In 1980, Taylor made her film debut as Marcie Stanler in Sean S. Cunningham's horror film Friday the 13th. She starred alongside Kevin Bacon, Adrienne King, and Betsy Palmer. Taylor portrayed the lead, Madame Trentoni / Aurelia Johnson, in Robert Kalfin's off-Broadway production Hijinks! from December 17, 1980, to January 18, 1981. In 1982, Taylor portrayed Samantha Edwards in the television film The Royal Romance of Charles and Diana.

In 1984, Taylor portrayed Henrietta in the stage production of Robert and Elizabeth. The following year, she portrayed Nina in Robert Kalfin's stage production Seagulls. In 2006, archive footage of her was used in the documentary Going to Pieces: The Rise and Fall of the Slasher Film.

=== Later career ===
After appearing in several films and onstage, Taylor worked as the marketing manager for The Institutional Investor, a New York-based magazine.

In 2010, Taylor reunited with Robert Kalfin for the stage production A Cable from Gibraltar, which was staged at the Medicine Show Theatre in New York City. In 2013, Taylor appeared as herself in the documentary Crystal Lake Memories: The Complete History of Friday the 13th.

== Personal life ==
Taylor married twice, both of which ended in divorce, before marrying James Whitney McConnell on February 3, 1990; the two married at St. Bartholomew's Episcopal Church in New York City.

== Filmography ==
Year	Title	Role	Notes
1980	Friday the 13th	Marcie Stanler	Feature film
1982	The Royal Romance of Charles and Diana	Samantha Edwards	Television film

== Stage credits ==
Year	Title	Role	Notes
1979	The Umbrellas of Cherbourg	Jenny	The Public Theater
1979	Home Again, Home Again	Linda	American Shakespeare Theatre / Royal Alexandra Theatre
1980–1981	Hijinks!	Madame Trentoni / Aurelia Johnson	Off-Broadway
1982	Robert and Elizabeth	Henrietta	Paper Mill Playhouse
1985	Seagulls	Nina	Cincinnati Playhouse
2010	A Cable from Gibraltar	Infant Girl / Woman / Old Woman	Medicine Show Theatre
