= I Am Anne Frank (musical) =

I Am Anne Frank is a 1996 song cycle by Enid Futterman and Michael Cohen, adapted from their 1985 musical-theater piece Yours, Anne.

A staged version featured at the Ivey Awards under direction of Ben Krywoscz and musical direction of Mindy Eschedor of the Nautilus Music Theater. The New Jersey premiere took place at the Blairstown Theater Festival.

Andrea Marcovicci played Anne Frank and Stephen Bogardus played Peter van Pels in the New York premiere at Alice Tully Hall in October 1996.
