= Carol J. Clover =

American professor of film studies

- Born: Carol Jeanne Clover; July 31, 1940 (age 86); Visalia, California, U.S.
- Children: Joshua Clover (d. 2025)

Academic background
- Education: University of California, Berkeley

Academic work
- Discipline: Medieval studies, film studies
- Notable ideas: Final girl

Carol Jeanne Clover (born July 31, 1940) is an American professor of Medieval Studies (Early Northern Europe) and American Film at the University of California, Berkeley.

Clover has been widely published in her areas of expertise, and is the author of three books. Clover's 1992 book, Men, Women, and Chain Saws: Gender in the Modern Horror Film, achieved popularity beyond academe. Clover is credited with developing the "final girl" theory in the horror genre, which has changed both popular and academic conceptions of gender in horror films.

Clover is a featured expert in the film S&Man, which premiered at the Toronto International Film Festival in 2006.

== Biography ==
Clover attended the University of California at Berkeley for both her undergraduate and graduate studies. In 1965, Clover was a Fulbright Fellow at Uppsala University in Sweden. From 1971 to 1977 Clover was an assistant professor at Harvard University before returning to Berkeley, where she became Class of 1936 Professor Emerita in the departments of rhetoric, film and Scandinavian.

== Honors ==
Clover has been awarded fellowships by the American Council of Learned Societies, as well as the Mellon, Guggenheim, and Rockefeller foundations. In 2001 she became the Hesselgren Distinguished Professor (Sweden). She is a Fellow of the American Academy of Arts & Sciences (elected 1995) and has honorary doctorates from Lund University (Sweden) and the University of Iceland. For her scholarly contributions to the study of early Icelandic culture, she was honored in 2018 by the president of Iceland with the Knight's Cross of the Order of the Falcon. Clover was presented the 2020 Bram Stoker Award for Lifetime Achievement.

== Works ==
=== Books ===
- The Medieval Saga (1982). Cornell University Press.
- Old Norse Icelandic Literature: A Critical Guide (1985). University of Toronto Press, in association with the Medieval Academy of America.
- Men, Women, and Chain Saws: Gender in the Modern Horror Film (1992). Princeton University Press.
  - Reprint: the British Film Institute, 2004

=== Articles ===
- "Telling Evidence in Njáls saga", in Emotion, Violence, Vengeance and Law in the Middle Ages: Essays in Honour of William Ian Miller, ed. by Kate Gilbert and Stephen D. White, Medieval Law and Its Practice, 24 (Leiden: Brill, 2018), pp. 175–88 doi:10.1163/9789004366374_011.
- "God Bless Juries!" Refiguring American Film Genres History and Theory, ed. Nick Browne (University of California Press, 1998): 255-77.
- "Law and the Order of Popular Culture," Law in the Domains of Culture, ed. Austin Sarat and Thomas R. Kearns (University of Michigan Press, 1998): 97- 119.
- "Judging Audiences: The Trial Movie." Film Studies, ed. Christine Gledhill and Linda Williams. (London: Arnold, 1998).
- "Dancin’ in the Rain." Critical Inquiry, 21 (1995).
- "Regardless of Sex: Men, Women, and Power in Early Northern Europe." Speculum: Journal of the Medieval Academy of America, 68 (1993). Rpt. in Studying Medieval Women: Sex, Gender, Feminism. Medieval Academy of America, 1993. Rpt. in Representations, 44 (1993).
- "The Politics of Scarcity: On the Sex Ratio in Early Scandinavia." Scandinavian Studies, 60 (1988), 147–88. Rpt. in New Readings on Women in Old English Literature. Ed. Helen Damico and Alexandra Hennessey Olsen. Indiana Univ. Press.
- "Hildigunnr's Lament: Women in Bloodfeud." In Structure and Meaning. Ed. Gerd Wolfgang Weber, et al. Odense Univ. Press, 1987.
- "The Long Prose Form." Arkiv för nordisk filologi, 101 (1986).
- "The Germanic Context of the Unferth Episode," Speculum, 55 (1980).
- "Her Body, Himself: Gender in the Slasher Film," Representations, 20 (1987).
- "Warrior Maidens and Other Sons", Journal of English and Germanic Philology, 85 (1986), 35–49.
- "Vǫlsunga saga and the Missing Lai of Marie de France’, in Sagnaskemmtun: Studies in Honour of Hermann Pálsson on his 65th Birthday, 26th May 1986, ed. by Rudolf Simek, Jónas Kristjánsson and Hans Bekker-Nielsen, Philologica Germanica, 8 (Vienna: Böhlau, 1986), pp. 79–84.

== See also ==
- Film criticism
  - List of film critics
- Nóregs konungatal
- Halloween
