= Dan McCoy =

American comedian (born 1978)

Daniel Kirk McCoy (born June 19, 1978) is an American comedian and was an Emmy-winning writer for the news satire program The Daily Show. He is the producer and co-host of the movie podcast The Flop House, which he co-hosts with comedian/bar owner Stuart Wellington and former Daily Show head writer Elliott Kalan. He is the creator and co-star (along with Daily Show writer Matt Koff) of the animated webseries 9 AM Meeting, which won an MTV development deal at the 2010 New York Television Festival.

McCoy lives in New York with his wife, Audrey, and their two cats.

McCoy's father, Jerry McCoy, is a professor emeritus at Eureka College. Dan McCoy is a 1996 graduate of Eureka High School in Eureka, Illinois. He is also a member of the Earlham College (Richmond, Indiana) Class of 2000.
