= Men, Women, and Chain Saws =

1992 book by Carol J. Clover

Men, Women, and Chain Saws: Gender in the Modern Horror Film
- Cover of the first edition
- Author: Carol J. Clover
- Language: English
- Subject: Gender in slasher films
- Publisher: Princeton University Press
- Publication date: 1992
- Publication place: United States
- Media type: Print
- Pages: 260
- ISBN: 0-691-00620-2

Men, Women, and Chain Saws: Gender in the Modern Horror Film is a non-fiction book by American academic Carol J. Clover, published in 1992. The book is a cultural critique and investigation of gender in horror films and the appeal of horror cinema, in particular the slasher, occult, and rape-revenge genres, from a feminist perspective.

The books first chapter, an essay entitled Her Body, Himself examining gender and identification in the slasher film, is the most famous part of the book, coining the term final girl, which has since entered mainstream use.

The book was nominated for the Bram Stoker Award for Best Non-Fiction in 1992.
