= Ginger (1971 film) =

1971 American drama film

- Directed by: Don Schain
- Written by: Don Schain
- Produced by: Ralph T. Desiderio
- Starring: Cheri Caffaro; Cindy Barnett; Herbert Kerr
- Cinematography: R. Kent Evans
- Music by: Robert G. Orpin
- Production company: Derio
- Release date: 1971
- Running time: 100 minutes
- Country: United States
- Language: English

Ginger is a 1971 film starring Cheri Caffaro. It was the first in the "Ginger" trilogy. It was written and directed by Don Schain. The lead character was described as a female James Bond. The Abductors, a sequel to Ginger, was released in 1972. The final film in the trilogy, Girls are for Loving, was released in 1973.

== Premise ==
A girl, Ginger, goes undercover to bust a prostitution ring.

== Production ==
It was shot in New Jersey in 1970.

== Reception ==
The film made $2 million.

The film was "an unlikely hit of 1971" and was described as follows, "Atrociously acted, sluggishly paced, with audio, camerawork and production values that would have disgraced a syndicated television show".

The website Nostalgia Central stated, "he acting is wobbly, the script is implausible, the plot is poor, the sets are cheap (a lot of it is clearly filmed in motel rooms) and the cinematography is dodgy – but this made-in-New-Jersey effort is 1970s sexploitation at its best." while Pulp International found that "the value of Ginger is not artistic or erotic—it's historic. With its in-your-face nudity and harsh racial language it's a type of movie that may never, ever be made again."
