= Too Hot to Handle (1977 film) =

1977 film by Don Schain

- Theatrical release poster
- Directed by: Don Schain
- Written by: Don Buday; Don Schain; Jan Michael Sherman
- Produced by: Ralph T. Desiderio
- Starring: Cheri Caffaro; Aharon Ipalé; Corinne Calvet; Vic Diaz; John Van Dreelen
- Cinematography: Fred Conde
- Edited by: Barbara Pokras
- Music by: Hugo Montenegro
- Distributed by: New World Pictures
- Release date: 27 May 1977
- Running time: 88 minutes
- Countries: United States; Philippines
- Language: English

Too Hot to Handle is a 1977 exploitation film directed by directed by Don Schain and starring Cheri Caffaro, Aharon Ipalé, Corinne Calvet and Vic Diaz. The plot concerns about the adventures of hitwoman Samantha Fox in the Philippines. The film is also billed as She's Too Hot to Handle.

== Plot ==
Samantha Fox engages in secret agent exploits in Manila.

== Cast ==
- Cheri Caffaro as Samantha Fox
- Aharon Ipalé as Domingo De La Torres
- Vic Diaz as Sanchez
- Corinne Calvet as Madame Ruanda
- John Van Dreelen as MacKenzie Portman (as John vanDreelen)
- Jordan Rosengarten as Justin Stockwell
- Butz Aquino as Carlos Rossimo
- Subas Herrero as Octavio Calderone
- Grace Lee as Miss Chow
- Paquito Salcedo as Lu Chang
- Vic Silayan as District Attorney
- Joonee Gamboa as Mr. Bulacon (as June Gamboa)

== Reception ==
Leonard Maltin called it a "(t)rashy sex- adventure film".
