= Jeramie Rain =

American actress (born 1948)

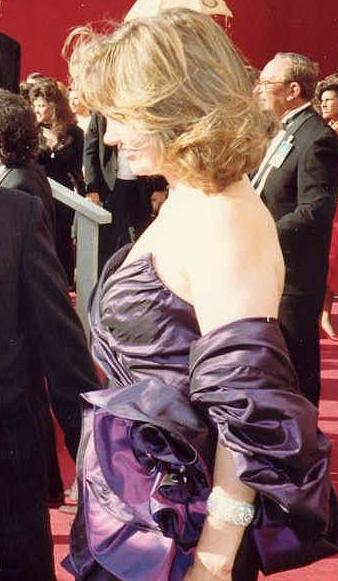
- Rain in 1988
- Born: Susan Davis; August 23, 1948 (age 77); Charleston, West Virginia, U.S.
- Other names: Jeramie Rain Dreyfus; Sue Davis; Kristin Marle
- Occupation(s): Actress, screenwriter, producer
- Spouse: Richard Dreyfuss (m. 1983; div. 1995)
- Children: 3

Jeramie Rain (born Susan Davis; August 23, 1948) is an American screenwriter, producer, philanthropist and former actress. Rain began her career with starring roles in several local stage productions in Charleston before moving to New York City in the early 1970s. After appearing in a string of commercials, she made her film debut in the crime film The Abductors (1972), then became known for roles as Sadie in Wes Craven's controversial horror film The Last House on the Left (1972) and Willie Mae in Albert T. Viola's comedy film Preacherman Meets Widderwoman (1973).

Outside of film, Rain had a supporting role as Nurse Samantha Tolliver in the soap opera The Doctors (1972–77), followed by guest appearances on several soap operas, including General Hospital, and starring roles in off-Broadway productions, including 22 Years and The Fan Club. Rain quit acting in the mid-1970s and subsequently worked as a writer and producer for NBC and CBS. At the age of 28, Rain was diagnosed with systemic lupus and has launched several philanthropic efforts to bring awareness to the disease.

== Early life ==
Rain was born as Susan Davis in Charleston, West Virginia, on August 23, 1948, the daughter of Mr. and Mrs. Hugh Davis. During her adolescent years, she worked with the Children's Theatre, Kanawha Players, and The Light Opera Guild. She graduated from George Washington High School in 1966, then moved to New York City in the early 1970s.

== Career ==
After appearing in a string of commercials, Rain had a short stage, film and television acting career from 1972 to 1973.

Rain made her film debut as Jane in Don Schain's 1972 crime film The Abductors. In January 1972, under the stage name Kristin Marle, Rain portrayed Sadie Mae Glutz (who was born only weeks before Rain) in the two-week run of 22 Years, an off-Broadway musical production that revolved around the story of the Charles Manson murders. She next appeared as Sadie in Wes Craven's controversial rape and revenge film The Last House on the Left (1972).

Rain played Nurse Samantha Tolliver in the soap opera The Doctors from 1972 to 1977 and had guest appearances on General Hospital. In 1973, Rain was cast in the comedy film Preacherman Meets Widderwoman. After this role, Rain retired from acting and worked as a writer and producer at CBS. She worked in Rockefeller Center and the Los Angeles location.

In the early 1990s, she founded Mother's Touch, a Los Angeles-based charity that benefits children diagnosed with serious illnesses. In 2000, David A. Szulkin interviewed Rain for his book Wes Craven's Last House on the Left, which tells the inside story of making the film. In 2003, Rain appeared as herself in the documentary Celluloid Crime of the Century.

== Personal life ==
Rain was a friend of John Belushi and tried to discourage him from using drugs. She was diagnosed with systemic lupus at the age of 28, though she suffered from it all through her 20s. Her first pregnancy in 1983 exacerbated her condition so severely that she could not hold her new daughter for two years, due to the loss of use of both of her arms. Rain married actor Richard Dreyfuss in 1983, and they had three children together before their 1995 divorce: Emily (born in 1983), Benjamin (born in 1986), and Harry (born in 1990).

In an interview in 2009, Rain—who once played Manson Family member Susan Atkins on stage—said that she was once picked up hitch-hiking by Tex Watson and Charles Manson, stayed in their van after her friends were dropped off, and that they later showed up at her aunt's house.

== Filmography ==
=== Film ===
Year	Title	Role	Notes
1972	The Abductors	Jane	Feature film
1972	The Last House on the Left	Sadie	Feature film
1973	Preacherman Meets Widderwoman	Willie Mae (as Sue Davis)	Feature film
2003	Celluloid Crime of the Century	Herself	Documentary, short

=== Theatre ===
Year	Title	Role	Notes
1972	22 Years	Sadie Mae Glutz (as Kristin Marle)	Off-Broadway
1972	The Fan Club	Supporting	Off-Broadway

=== Television ===
Year	Title	Role	Notes
1972	The Female Instinct	Supporting	TV pilot
1972	General Hospital	Guest	3 episodes
1972-77	The Doctors	Nurse Samantha Tolliver	30 episodes
1987	The Simon Wiesenthal Center Annual Humanitarian Awards Honoring Anatoly Scharansky	Herself	TV special
1987	The Annual Entertainment Industry Honors Presents a Salute to Bud Grant	Herself	TV movie
1991	1st Annual Environmental Media Awards	Herself	TV special
