= A Place Called Today =

1972 film directed by Don Schain

- Theatrical release poster
- Directed by: Don Schain
- Written by: Don Schain
- Produced by: Ralph T. Desiderio
- Starring: J. Herbert Kerr Jr. Lana Wood; Cheri Caffaro; Richard Smedley; Timothy Brown; Peter Carew
- Cinematography: R. Kent Evans
- Edited by: Harry D. Glass
- Music by: Robert G. Orpin
- Production company: Derio Productions
- Distributed by: Embassy Pictures
- Release date: June 7, 1972
- Running time: 103 minutes
- Country: United States
- Language: English

A Place Called Today is a 1972 American drama film written and directed by Don Schain. The film stars J. Herbert Kerr Jr., Lana Wood, Cheri Caffaro, Richard Smedley, Timothy Brown and Peter Carew. The film was released on June 7, 1972, by Embassy Pictures. The film is also known as City in Fear.

== Plot ==
During a political campaign for mayor elections in an American town, white and black militants attack each other violently, leading to the kidnapping of Cindy, the mistress of one of the candidates.

== Cast ==
- J. Herbert Kerr Jr. as Randy Johnson
- Lana Wood as Carolyn Schneider
- Cheri Caffaro as Cindy Cartwright
- Richard Smedley as Ron Carton
- Timothy Brown as Steve Smith
- Peter Carew as Ben Atkinson
- Woody Carter as Black Radical
- Leo Tepp as Alexander Cartwright
- Cucho Viera as White Radical
- Howard Zeiden as Doug Gilmore
- Humphrey Davis as John Higgins
- Mary Rio Lewis as Mrs. Johnson

== Reception ==
In his list of the 10 worst films of 1972, Vincent Canby of The New York Times, wrote of A Place Called Today, "This is my sentimental choice as the most horrible film of the year, one of the two soft-core porn films of 1972 that, starred Cheri Caffaro (Mrs. Don Schain) as a singularly unqualified enchantress, a role that amounts to a kind of character part for her. The film also has to do with a furiously complicated and crooked election campaign involving a crooked black politician, a crooked white politician, and a pretty white revolutionary (Lana Wood) who obviously divides her time equally between participating in politics and applying eye make-up."
