= Fred J. Lincoln =

American actor and director

- Born: January 19, 1936; New York City, U.S.
- Died: January 16, 2013 (aged 76); Los Angeles, California, U.S.
- Other name: F. J. Lincoln
- Occupation: Pornographic filmmaker
- Years active: 1971–2011

Fred J. Lincoln (January 19, 1936 – January 16, 2013) was an American director, producer, screenwriter, actor, editor, and cinematographer of pornographic films.

== Biography ==
Born Fred Piantadosi, Lincoln grew up in the Hell's Kitchen neighborhood of New York City. His career in adult film and video was prolific; his filmography at the Internet Movie Database credits him as the director of 310 films, the producer of 42, and as an actor in 64 films. In 1984, Lincoln won the Critics' Adult Film Award as Best Director for his film Go for It.

His credits in mainstream cinema are limited, although he did play the role of Fred "Weasel" Podowski in Wes Craven's 1972 horror film The Last House on the Left. He starred alongside David Hess, Sandra Peabody, Jeramie Rain, Marc Sheffler and Lucy Grantham. He contributed to its DVD commentary track with costars Hess and Sheffler. In 1973, he starred in Sean S. Cunningham's horror film Case of the Full Moon Murders with his Last House costar Sandra Peabody.

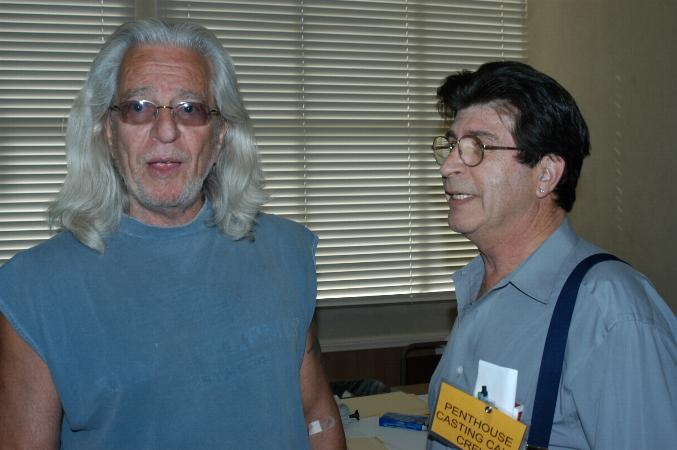
Lincoln, left, with Henri Pachard in 2004

Lincoln was a member of the AVN Hall of Fame, and the XRCO Hall of Fame.

Lincoln succeeded Larry Levinson as the owner of the 1970s and 1980s New York City sex club Plato's Retreat.

Lincoln was married several times, most notably to pornographic director Patti Rhodes-Lincoln and former pornographic actress Tiffany Clark.

At one point, Lincoln lived in Ventura, California in an apartment adjacent to pornographic actress Erica Boyer.

== Death ==
Lincoln died on January 17, 2013, at his home in Los Angeles from complications of emphysema and heart disease at age 76. He is survived by his daughter Angelica and his son, Charles.

== Partial filmography ==
Year	Film	Role	Credits	Notes
1971	Pay the Babysitter	Unknown role	actor only	
1971	SEX USA	First guy having sex	actor only	
1972	The Last House on the Left	Fred "Weasel" Podowski	actor only	only non-pornographic acting role
1973	Case of the Full Moon Murders	Joe	actor only	Credited as Fred Lincoln
1974	Teenage Nurses	Fred	actor only	
1976	Souperman	Dick Larson	actor/writer/producer/director	directorial debut
1978	A Formal Faucett	Guy on Street	actor/director	
1980	A Place Beyond Shame		writer/producer/director	
1983	Go For It		writer/producer/director	
1985	Freedom of Choice		director only	
1986	Rough Draft		director only	
1989	Coming of Age	Granpappy	actor/producer/director	
1991	Strange Behavior	Hunter	actor/producer/director	
1991	Vegas 5: Blackjack		cinematographer only	
1992	Sterling Silver		producer/editor	
1994	Pleasure Dome: The Genesis Chamber		editor only	
1997	Terror Night		writer/director	
1998	69 Hours	Unknown role	writer/director	
1999	The Shark		director only	
2000	Up for Grabs		director only	
2000	Sexual Healing		director only	
2003	Looking for Love		editor/director	
2004	Garden of Eatin'		director only	
2006	Return to Insanity		director only	
2007	Porn Valley	Poker Buddy	actor only	
2008	The Last Rose	Fred	actor only	
2009	Oriental Babysitters		editor only	
2010	Girls Who Want Girls		editor only	
2011	Foot Fuckers		editor only	
2011	Evil Cuckold 2		editor only	
