= Case of the Full Moon Murders =

1973 sexploitation comedy film by Sean S. Cunningham

- Film poster under the title The Case of the Smiling Stiffs
- Directed by: Sean S. Cunningham; Brud Talbot
- Written by: Jerry Hayling
- Produced by: Sean S. Cunningham; Brud Talbot
- Starring: Sheila Stuart
- Cinematography: Gus Graham
- Edited by: Steve Miner
- Music by: Steve Chapin
- Production companies: Dana Films; Lobster Enterprises
- Distributed by: Sean S. Cunningham Films
- Release date: October 17, 1973
- Running time: 74 minutes
- Country: United States
- Language: English

Case of the Full Moon Murders (also known as The Case of the Smiling Stiffs) is a 1973 sexploitation comedy film directed by Sean S. Cunningham and Brud Talbot and starring Fred J. Lincoln and Harry Reems.

It features many of the same cast and crew as the 1972 horror film The Last House on the Left, though is wholly disparate in terms of its tone and content. It was advertised with the tagline "The First Sex-Rated Whodunit," reflecting the film's mix of softcore pornography and mystery film elements.

== Plot ==
A killer, who may be a vampire, leaves her victims with smiles on their faces.

== Cast ==
- Todd McMillan
- Andrew Galloways

== Filming locations ==
The movie was filmed in Miami, Florida.

== See also ==
- List of American films of 1973
