= Christa Speck =

Polish model and actress (1942–2013)

Playboy centerfold appearance
- September 1961
- Preceded by: Karen Thompson
- Succeeded by: Jean Cannon

Playboy Playmate of the Year
- 1962
- Preceded by: Linda Gamble
- Succeeded by: June Cochran

Personal details
- Born: August 1, 1942 Danzig, German Reich
- Died: March 22, 2013 (aged 70) Los Angeles, California, U.S.
- Height: 5 ft 5 in (165 cm)

Christa Speck (August 1, 1942 – March 22, 2013) was a German model and actress. She was chosen as Playboy magazine's Playmate of the Month for the September 1961 issue and as the 1962 Playmate of the Year. Her original pictorial was photographed by Sam Wu.

== Career ==
Speck was working as a bank secretary at Bank of America when she was discovered by Playboy. She was chosen as Playboy magazine's Playmate of the Month for the September 1961 issue and as the 1962 Playmate of the Year, the first foreign-born model to be so named. She worked as a Bunny in the company's Chicago nightclub, lived in the Playboy Mansion, and was featured in all of the magazine's '60s pictorials about life at the Mansion: 1961's Playmate Holiday House Party, 1963's Playmate Pillow Fight and Bunnies, and 1966's The Playboy Mansion. Speck was selected by Playboy editors and readers as one of their "ten favorite Playmates from the magazine’s first decade."

Her centerfold is seen in the 1978 film Animal House, which takes place in 1962. Speck is mentioned in the 2007 book Confessions of a Crabgrass Cowboy: From Lincoln Logs to Lava Lamps: Coming of Age in an Early American Suburb by William Schwarz. She is also mentioned briefly in the 2011 book The Bunny Years by fellow, former Bunny Kathryn Leigh Scott.

== Personal life ==
Speck was born in Danzig, Germany (now Gdańsk, Poland).

She was later married to children's programming producer Marty Krofft. Speck and Krofft had three daughters.

== Death ==
Speck died of natural causes at her home in Los Angeles, California, at the age of 70.

== See also ==
- List of people in Playboy 1960–1969
