= Sam Wu =

American photographer

Samuel Wu (February 19, 1919 – August 19, 2005) was an American photographer during the 1950s and 1960s.

Wu worked for adult magazines such as Playboy and Modern Man. He photographed Playboy centerfolds of Rusty Fisher, Pat Sheehan, and Christa Speck. He also filmed Pat Sheehan's centerfold and Tania Velia movie pics. Glamor Photography Magazine, #5 of 1968 was devoted as Sam Wu Special Issue.

He was married to Grace Chun-Fan Wu.
