= Cheri Caffaro =

American actress

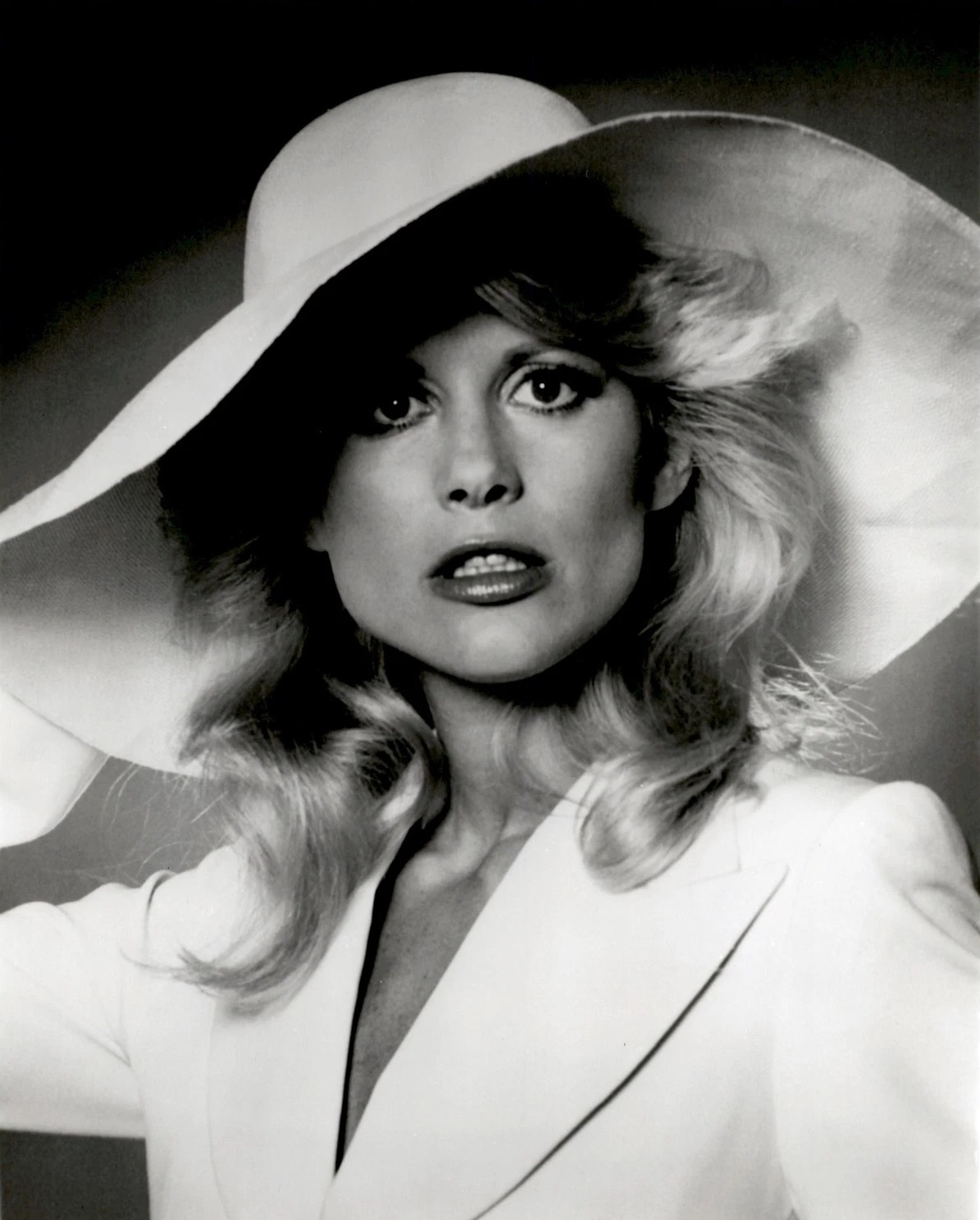
- Occupation: Actress
- Years active: 1971–1977
- Spouse: Don Schain (m. 1971; div. 1982)

Cheri Caffaro is an American actress who appeared mainly in low-budget exploitation films in the 1970s.

== Career ==
In 1960, a fifteen-year-old Pasadena resident, she won a Life-magazine-reported Brigitte Bardot look-alike contest, beating a twelve-year-old Portland Mason.

In the early 1970s, she was directed by then-husband and Manhattan theatre owner Don Schain in a series of softcore sexploitation action films, most notably the "Ginger" trilogy, consisting of Ginger, The Abductors and Girls Are For Loving. Caffaro played Ginger McAllister, a tough and resourceful bed-hopping private-eye and spy. Her missions involved busting up seedy wrongdoers involved in drugs, prostitution and white slavery. Her character also spends an inordinate amount of time bound and gagged and/or raped.

Caffaro also appeared in A Place Called Today and Too Hot To Handle (both also directed by Schain). She was quickly stereotyped, became disenchanted with the direction her film career had taken and disappeared from the public eye.

She has also been credited with an appearance on the TV show Baretta, and as a writer and producer of the 1979 sex comedy H.O.T.S. Her last screen credit is noted as a character voice in an episode of the 1997 animated TV series Extreme Ghostbusters.

== Filmography ==
- Ginger (1971)
- Up Your Alley (1971)
- The Abductors (1972)
- A Place Called Today (1972)
- Girls Are for Loving (1973)
- Savage Sisters (1974)
- Too Hot to Handle (1977)
