= The Tropicana Holiday =

Striptease revue

- Characters: Jayne Mansfield (Trixie Divoon); Mickey Hargitay; Elaine Dunn; Cathy Crosby; Dante D'Paulo; Gearoge Chakaris; Lizanne Truex; Sean Garrison; Jack Ackerman
- Mute: Showgirls (8) including Pat Sheehan Sandra Jo Drummond, and Felicia Atkins; Chorus line (7)
- Genre: Striptease revue

Premiere
- Date: February 12, 1958
- Place: Tropicana Las Vegas

The Tropicana Holiday was a striptease revue starring Jayne Mansfield. It was launched in February 1958 at the Tropicana casino on the Las Vegas Strip under a four weeks contract which was extended to eight. The opening night raised $20,000.00 for March of Dimes ($223,183 in 2025 dollars). Mansfield received $25,000.00 per week for her performance as Trixie Divoon in the show ($278,979 in 2025 dollars). The showgirls were paid $200.00 per week. The show was produced by Monte Proser and stage managed by Earl Barton. Nat Brandwynne and Orchestra played the original music by Gordon Jenkins. Glen Holse designed the set. Mansfield's last nightclub act French Dressing was at Latin Quarter in New York City in 1966. It was a modified version of the Tropicana show, and ran for six weeks with fair success.
