= Richard Dreyfuss =

American actor (born 1947)

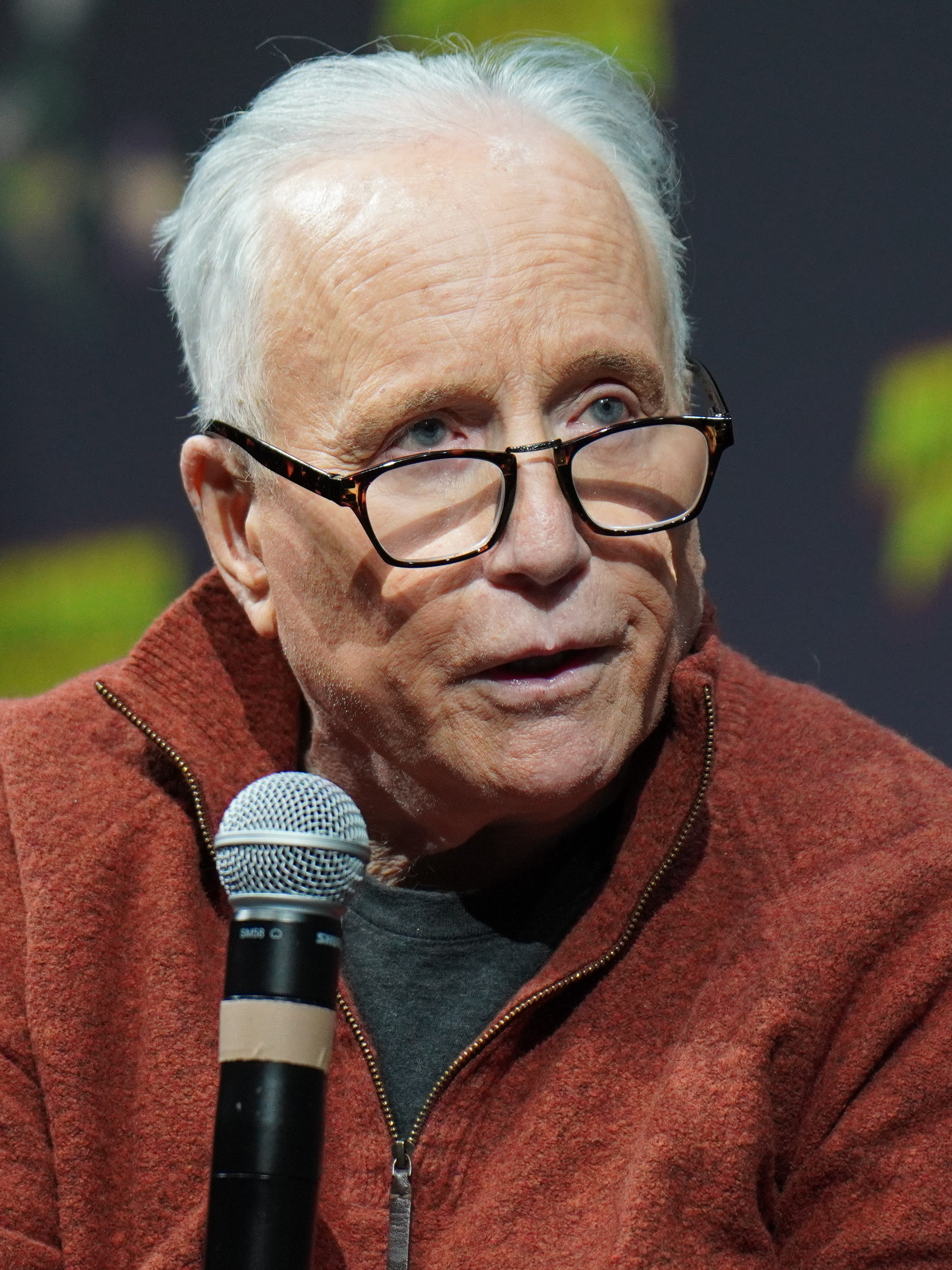
- Dreyfuss in 2023
- Born: Richard Stephen Dreyfus; October 29, 1947 (age 79); New York City, U.S.
- Occupations: Actor; producer
- Years active: 1964–present
- Works: Full list
- Spouses: Jeramie Rain (m. 1983; div. 1995) Janelle Lacey (m. 1999; div. 2005) Svetlana Erokhin (m. 2006)
- Children: 3
- Relatives: Lorin Dreyfuss (brother); Natalie Dreyfuss (niece)

Richard Stephen Dreyfuss (/ˈdraɪfəs/ DRY-fəs; né Dreyfus; born October 29, 1947) is an American actor. He emerged from the New Hollywood wave of American cinema, finding fame with a succession of leading man parts in the 1970s. He has received numerous acting honors, including an Academy Award, a BAFTA Award, a Satellite Award, a David di Donatello Award, a Saturn Award, and a Golden Globe Award, as well as nominations for two Actor Awards, two Photoplay Awards, and a Grammy Award.

Dreyfuss rose to prominence with starring roles in American Graffiti (1973), The Apprenticeship of Duddy Kravitz (1974), Jaws (1975), and Close Encounters of the Third Kind (1977). He won the Academy Award for Best Actor for his portrayal of Elliot Garfield in the 1977 romantic comedy The Goodbye Girl, and was Oscar-nominated in the same category for his title role in the 1995 drama Mr. Holland's Opus. His other film credits include The Competition (1980), Stand by Me (1986), Down and Out in Beverly Hills (1986), Stakeout (1987), Nuts (1987), Always (1989), Postcards from the Edge (1990), What About Bob? (1991), The American President (1995), Poseidon (2006), W. (2008), Piranha 3D (2010), and Red (2010).

On television, Dreyfuss starred as the title character on the CBS drama series The Education of Max Bickford (2001–2002), for which he was nominated for the Screen Actors Guild Award for Outstanding Performance by a Male Actor. He also portrayed Fagin in the 1997 Disney adaptation of Oliver Twist, Meyer Lansky in HBO's Lansky (1999), Alexander Haig in Showtime's The Day Reagan Was Shot (2001), and Bernie Madoff in the ABC miniseries Madoff (2016).

== Early life and education ==
Dreyfuss was born on October 29, 1947, in Brooklyn, New York City, the second son of Norman Dreyfuss, an attorney, restaurateur and plastics company owner originally from a "violent gang culture in Brooklyn", and Geraldine (nee Robbins), a peace activist. He is the second of three children. He had an older brother, Lorin, who was an actor, film producer and screenwriter, and a younger sister, Cathy. His father Norman suffered from the debilitating physical effects of a mortar explosion at the Battle of the Bulge in World War II, requiring the use of crutches, canes, and special footwear provided by the Army for the rest of his life. He left the family when his son was 21 years old, and remarried more than once; he and his son were not on speaking terms at the time of his death.

Dreyfuss was raised in the Bayside area of Queens from 1950 until the age of eight. His family is Jewish, descended from immigrants from Russia and Poland; the Dreyfuss family was from Rzeszów. He has commented that he "grew up thinking that Alfred Dreyfus and [he] are from the same family" and that his great-grandaunt was Hesya Helfman, one of the assassins of Tsar Alexander II of Russia and the only one to escape execution for the deed. His father disliked New York, and briefly moved the family first to Europe in February 1956, and then with funds running low, returned home and relocated to Los Angeles the same year when Dreyfuss was nine. Dreyfuss attended Beverly Hills High School.

== Career ==
=== 1964–1974: Rise to prominence ===
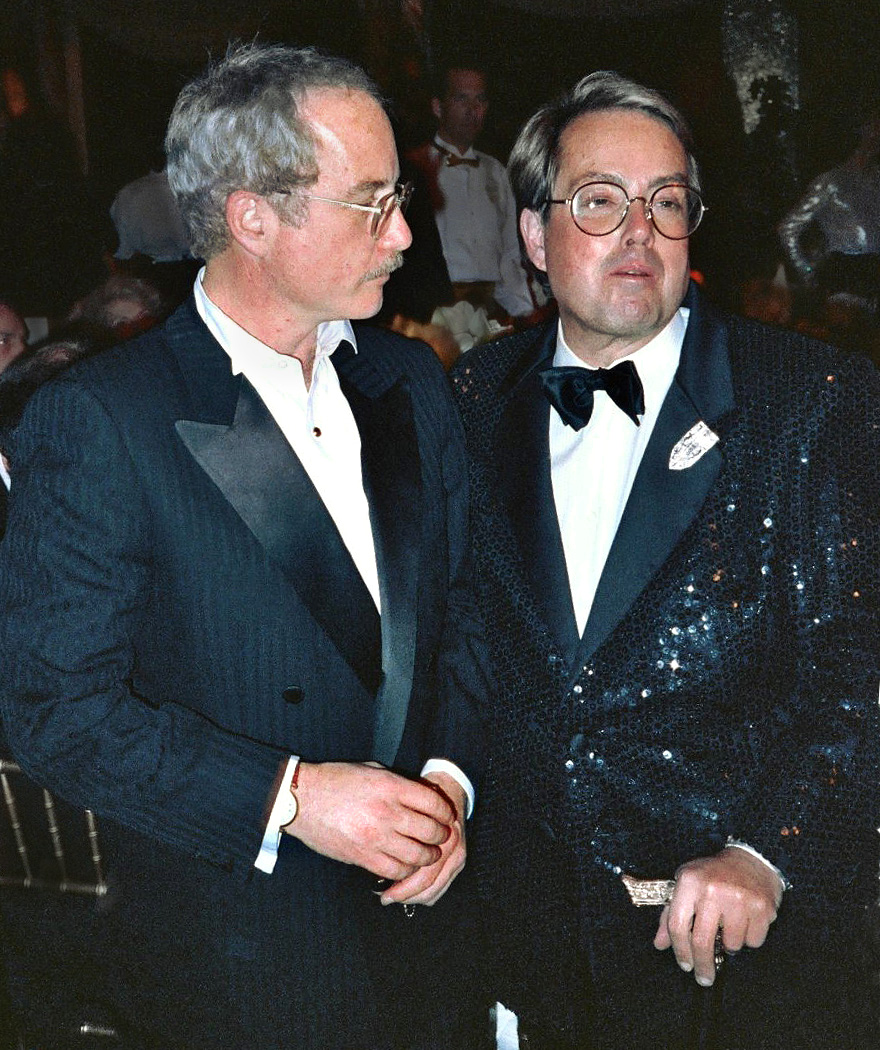
Dreyfuss (left) and producer Allan Carr at the Governors Ball after the 1989 Academy Awards

Dreyfuss began acting in his youth, at Temple Emanuel of Beverly Hills Arts Center and the Westside Jewish Community Center, under drama teacher Bill Miller. He debuted in the TV production In Mama's House, when he was fifteen. He attended San Fernando Valley State College, now California State University, Northridge, for a year, and was a conscientious objector during the Vietnam War, working in alternate service for two years, as a clerk in a Los Angeles hospital. During this time, he acted in a few small TV roles on shows such as Peyton Place, Room 222 , Gidget, That Girl, Gunsmoke, Bewitched, The Ghost & Mrs. Muir, and The Big Valley. He played a larger role in an episode in the second season of Judd, for the Defense. During the late 1960s and early 1970s, he also performed on stage on Broadway, Off-Broadway, repertory, and improvisational theater. Dreyfuss appeared in the play The Time of Your Life, which was revived on March 17, 1972, at the Huntington Hartford Theater in Los Angeles, and directed by Edwin Sherin.

Dreyfuss's first film role was a brief, uncredited appearance in The Graduate (1967), where he came up behind the landlord and said "Shall I get the cops? I'll get the cops," after Elaine's screams in Ben's room had disrupted the boarding house. He was also briefly seen as a stagehand in Valley of the Dolls (1967), in which he had a few lines. Dreyfuss featured more prominently in Hello Down There (1969) starring Tony Randall and Janet Leigh. In mid-1972, Dreyfuss filmed a supporting role in The Second Coming of Suzanne, but the movie did not premiere for two years. In 1973, he starred in the CBS pilot Catch-22. He subsequently appeared in Dillinger, and landed a key role in the 1973 George Lucas hit American Graffiti, acting with other future stars such as Harrison Ford. Dreyfuss played his first lead role in the Canadian film The Apprenticeship of Duddy Kravitz (1974), receiving positive reviews, including praise from Pauline Kael.

=== 1975–1995: Career stardom and acclaim ===
Dreyfuss went on to star in box office blockbusters Jaws (1975) and Close Encounters of the Third Kind (1977), both directed by Steven Spielberg. He won the 1978 Academy Award for Best Actor at the 50th Academy Awards ceremony for his portrayal of a struggling actor in The Goodbye Girl (1977), becoming the youngest actor to do so (at the age of 30 years, 125 days old), besting Marlon Brando, who had won his first Oscar in 1955 at the age of 30 years, 360 days old. This record stood for 25 years until it was broken in 2003 by Adrien Brody, who was three weeks shy of age 30 at the time of the 75th Academy Awards ceremony. Dreyfuss is still, however, the shortest to have ever won Best Actor, standing at about 5 foot 4 inches tall. In five years, between 1973 and 1978, the films that Dreyfuss appeared in grossed upwards of $900 million. He made his producing debut with The Big Fix (1978), in which he also starred.

Around 1978, Dreyfuss began using cocaine frequently; he claims to not remember anything from the production of the 1981 film Whose Life Is It Anyway?. His addiction came to a head in 1982, when he was arrested for possession of the drug after he blacked out while driving, and his Mercedes-Benz 450 SL struck a tree. He entered court-appointed rehabilitation and eventually made a Hollywood comeback with the films Down and Out in Beverly Hills in 1986 and Stakeout the following year. Dreyfuss appeared as the elder Gordie Lachance (played by his Buddy System co-star Wil Wheaton) in Rob Reiner's Stand by Me (narration only), a 1986 coming-of-age drama/comedy adapted from Stephen King's novella The Body. He was nominated for a Golden Globe playing a defense lawyer in the courtroom thriller Nuts (1987). In 1988, he reunited with director Paul Mazursky to star in the political farce Moon over Parador.

In 1989, Dreyfuss reunited with Spielberg on Always, a remake of A Guy Named Joe in which he co-starred with Holly Hunter, and reunited with his Close Encounters co-star Teri Garr for the comedy Let It Ride. In 1990, he appeared as a doctor in Postcards from the Edge, and after three pictures with Disney, Dreyfuss/James Productions, a company owned by Richard Dreyfuss and Judith James got a new production deal with Touchstone Pictures. He had a starring role opposite Bill Murray in the 1991 comedy What About Bob?, as a psychiatrist driven to insanity by a particularly obsessive new patient as a byproduct of the new deal. That same year, Dreyfuss produced and starred as Georges Picquart in Prisoner of Honor, an HBO movie about the historical Dreyfus Affair. In 1993, he reunited with his Stakeout co-star Emilio Estevez in Another Stakeout. In 1994, he participated in the historic Papal Concert to Commemorate the Shoah at the Vatican in the presence of Pope John Paul II, Rav Elio Toaff, chief rabbi of Rome, and Oscar Luigi Scalfaro, President of the Italian Republic. He recited Kaddish as part of a performance of Leonard Bernstein's Third Symphony with the Royal Philharmonic Orchestra under the baton of Gilbert Levine. The event was broadcast worldwide. Dreyfuss then played the political opponent of Michael Douglas's character in The American President (1995). That same year, he received his second Oscar nomination for his performance as Glenn Holland in Mr. Holland's Opus.

=== 1996–present ===
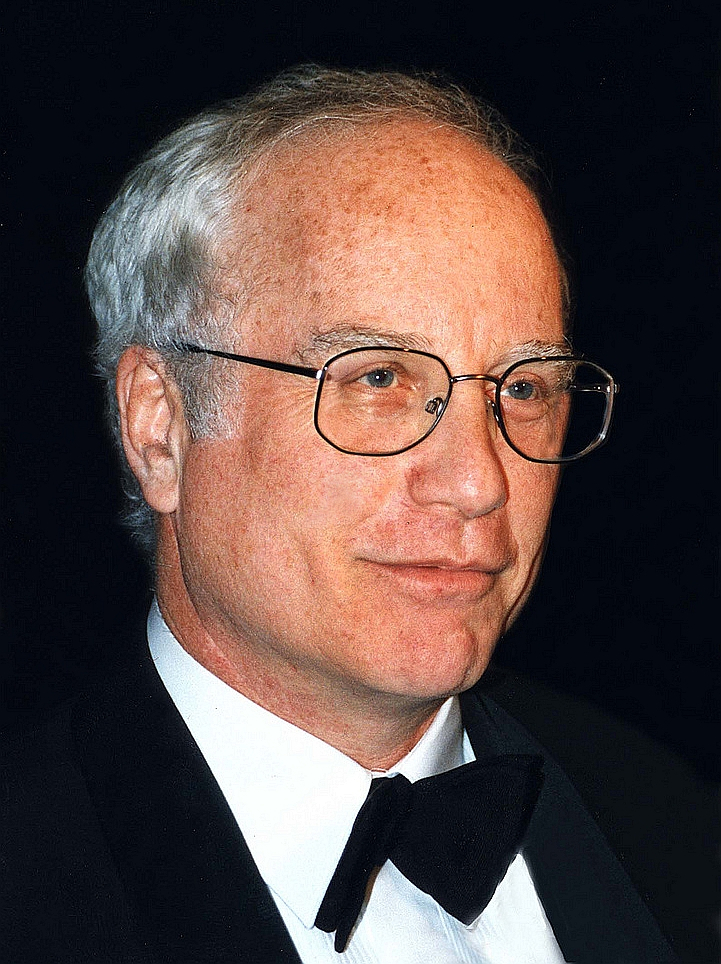
Dreyfuss in 1997

In 1997, Dreyfuss recorded a voiceover for the Apple Computer "Think Different" ad campaign, and also provided the voice of the narrator in The Call of the Wild: Dog of the Yukon. He also portrayed Fagin in the 1997 Disney adaptation of Oliver Twist and Meyer Lansky in HBO's 1999 film Lansky. In 1999, Dreyfuss made his London West End debut starring alongside Marsha Mason in Neil Simon's The Prisoner of Second Avenue at the Theatre Royal Haymarket. In 2001–2002, he played Max Bickford in the television drama The Education of Max Bickford for which he was nominated for the Screen Actors Guild Award for Outstanding Performance by a Male Actor. Dreyfuss also portrayed Alexander Haig in Showtime's The Day Reagan Was Shot (2001).

In 2004, he appeared in the revival of Sly Fox on Broadway (opposite Eric Stoltz, René Auberjonois, Bronson Pinchot and Elizabeth Berkley). Dreyfuss spent four years as a research adviser at St Antony's College, Oxford, from 2004 until 2008. He was scheduled to appear in a 2004 production of The Producers in London, but withdrew from the production a week before opening night. The media noted that Dreyfuss was suffering from problems relating to an operation for a herniated disc, and that the part of Max Bialystock in the play was a physically demanding one. Both he and his assistant for the production stated that Dreyfuss was accumulating injuries that required him to wear physical therapy supports during rehearsals. After Dreyfuss was officially let go from the production he was replaced by Nathan Lane.

In 2006, he appeared as Richard Nelson, a gay architect and one of the survivors in the film Poseidon. Dreyfuss portrayed U.S. vice president Dick Cheney in Oliver Stone's 2008 George W. Bush biopic W.

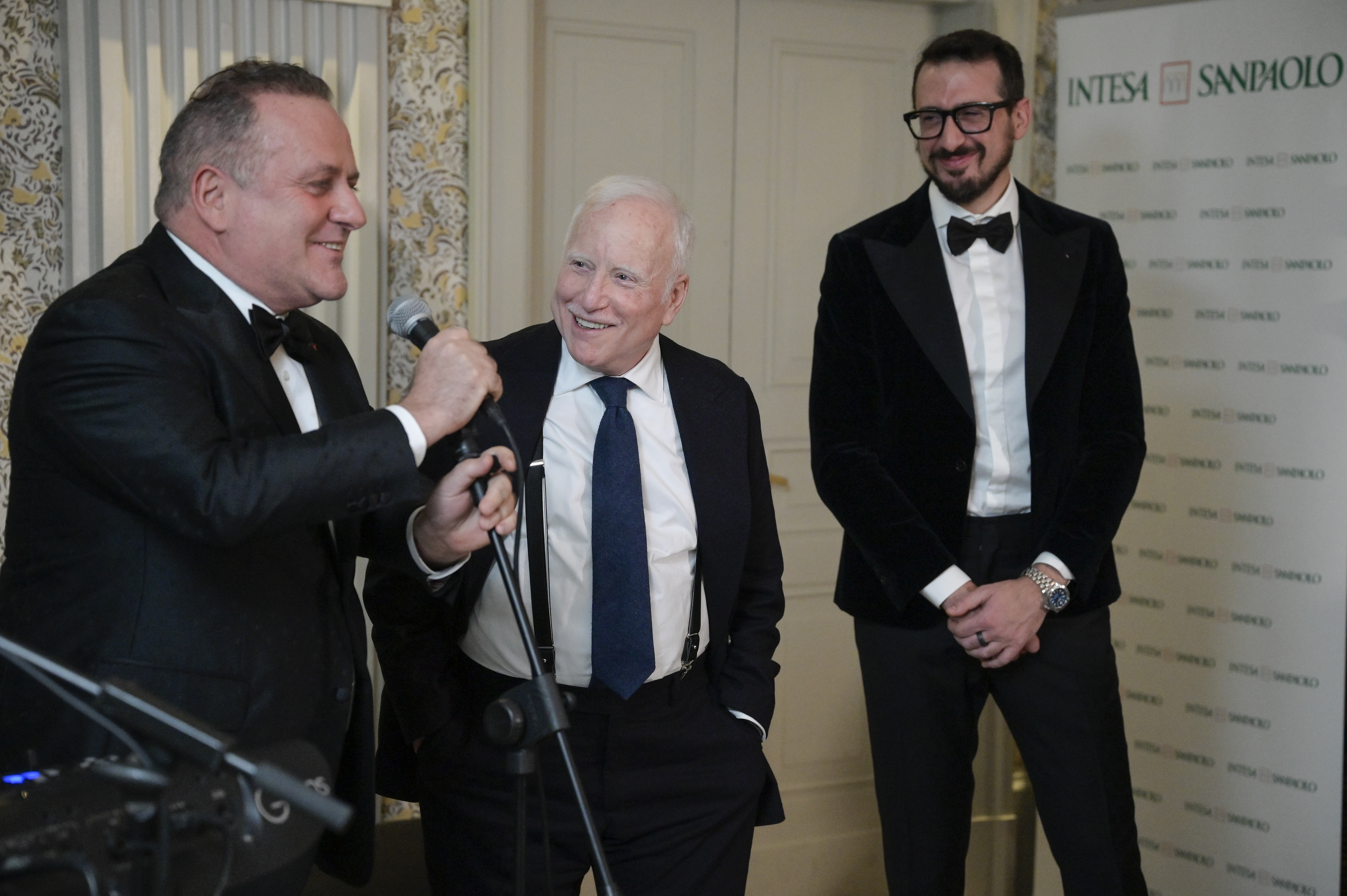
Dreyfuss at Italy Lifetime Achievement Awards (2021)

In 2009, he appeared in the play Complicit by Joe Sutton at the Old Vic. The production was directed by the theatre's artistic director, Kevin Spacey. Dreyfuss's performance was subject to some controversy, due to his use of an earpiece onstage, owing to his inability to learn his lines. In 2017, Dreyfuss's son Harry accused Spacey of groping him while he ran lines with the elder Dreyfuss in Spacey's apartment; Spacey denied the allegation. Richard Dreyfuss was focused on learning his lines and was unaware of any harassment.

Dreyfuss guest-voiced as himself in the Family Guy episode "Three Kings" in 2009, and later appeared in the episode "Peter-assment". Dreyfuss guest starred in the sixth season of Weeds as Warren Schiff, Nancy Botwin's high school teacher to whom she had lost her virginity.

In 2010, he played Matt Boyd in Piranha 3D and Alexander Dunning in Red (2010). Dreyfuss's star on the Hollywood Walk of Fame is located at 7021 Hollywood Blvd. Dreyfuss took part in the 2012 Academy Awards Night of 100 Stars.

In 2014, he appeared with best-selling Abraham Lincoln scholar Ronald C. White in a documentary entitled "Lincoln's Greatest Speech", highlighting Lincoln's Second Inaugural Address, appearing as host and reciting the speech on camera. Dreyfuss portrayed Bernie Madoff in Madoff (2016), co-starring Blythe Danner. He followed it up with roles in the hit comedy Book Club (2018) and the Netflix movie The Last Laugh.

== Personal life ==
=== Marriages and family ===
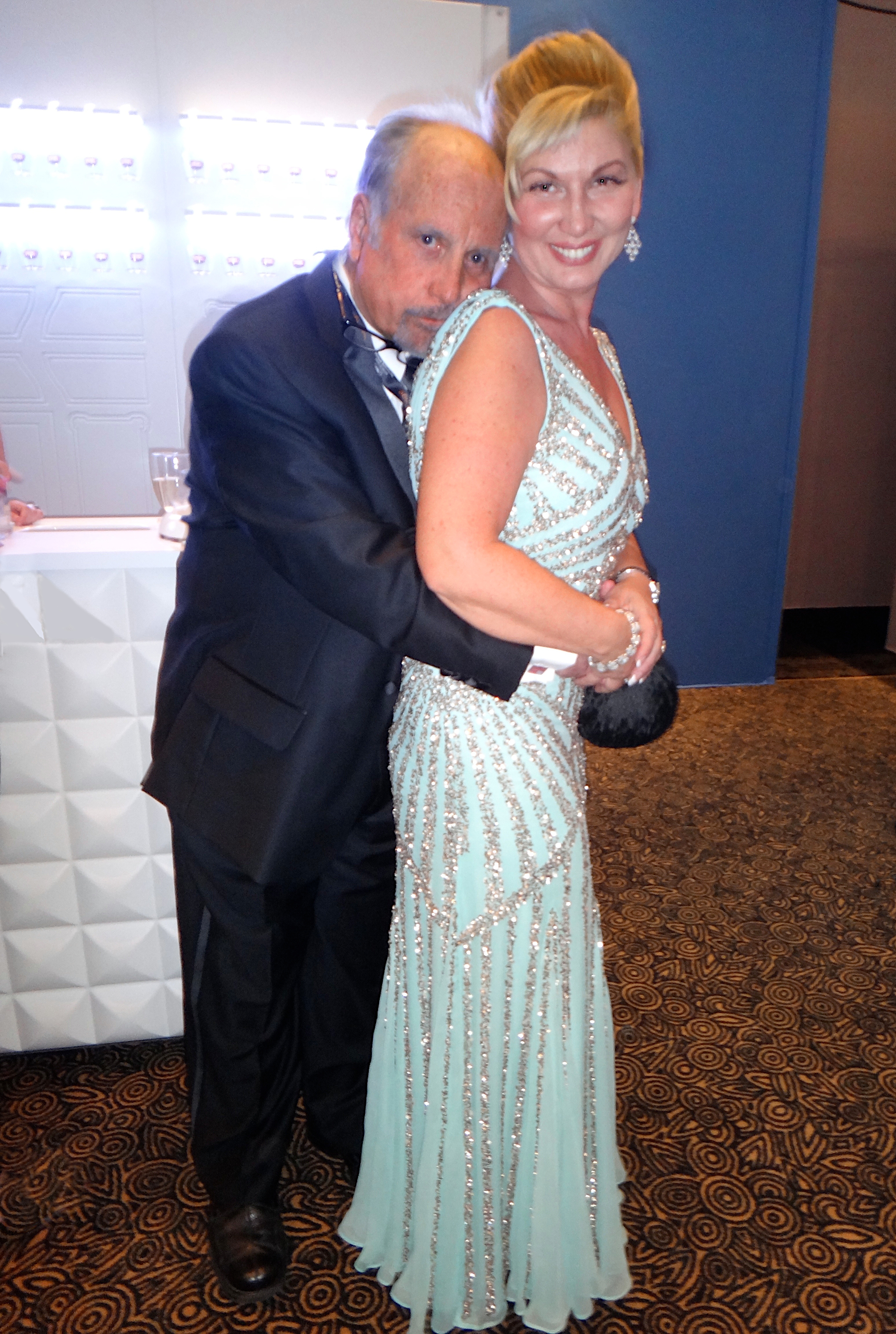
Dreyfuss with wife Svetlana in Cannes in 2013

Dreyfuss married writer and producer Jeramie Rain in the early 1980s, and they had three children. After his 1995 divorce from Rain, Dreyfuss married Janelle Lacey in 1999. They divorced in 2005.

In 2006, Dreyfuss discussed his diagnosis of bipolar disorder in the documentary Stephen Fry: The Secret Life of the Manic Depressive, in which Fry (who also has the disorder) interviewed Dreyfuss about his experience being bipolar.

Dreyfuss and Russian-born Svetlana Erokhin married in 2006 and as of February 2020 they reside in the San Diego area, although they have frequently visited New York City, London, and Sun Valley, Idaho.

During his acting career, Dreyfuss had public feuds with some of the people he worked alongside, notably actors Robert Shaw and Bill Murray, who co-starred with him in Jaws and What About Bob? respectively, and filmmaker Oliver Stone, who directed him in W.

In 2017, writer Jessica Teich accused Dreyfuss of sexual harassment during the filming of an ABC special. Dreyfuss denied the allegations, saying he had been overly flirtatious in the past and regretted his behavior, and emphasized that he "value[s] and respect[s] women" and is "not an assaulter". He further stated that he thought they were involved in a "consensual seduction ritual."

One of Dreyfuss's sons said in 2025 that he and his siblings had an estranged relationship with their father.

=== Interests ===
Dreyfuss seeks to revive civics education to teach future generations about the power of their citizenship and the principles that hold America together. In 2006, he created The Dreyfuss Civics Initiative (TDCI). TDCI is a 501(c)3 designated organization, recognized as of 2008.

In 2006, he spoke at The National Press Club in Washington, D.C., in hopes of prompting a national discussion on impeachment charges against U.S. President George W. Bush. Later that year, Dreyfuss appeared on HBO's Real Time with Bill Maher as a panel member to discuss teaching Civics in schools. In 2007, Dreyfuss appeared in the youth voting documentary film 18 in '08.

In 1995, Dreyfuss co-authored (with Harry Turtledove) The Two Georges, a novel in which the American Revolution had been peacefully avoided. In 2022, he wrote One Thought Scares Me...: We Teach Our Children What We Wish Them to Know; We Don't Teach Our Children What We Don't Wish Them to Know about the teaching of civics in American schools.

=== Political views ===
In a 2016 interview with TheWrap, Dreyfuss reportedly said, "I haven't been a Democrat since 2004."

Dreyfuss has been outspoken regarding the media's influence in shaping public opinion, policy, and legislation. In the 2000s, he expressed his sentiments in favor of right to privacy, freedom of speech, democracy, and individual accountability. In 2011 and 2014, Dreyfuss was elected to the Common Cause National Governing Board.

In May 2023, Dreyfuss spoke out against the Academy Awards' new diversity guidelines that require films to have met at least two of four benchmarks, including that the lead actors are from underrepresented groups or that at least 30% of the cast and crew come from these groups. During an interview with Margaret Hoover, host of the PBS show The Firing Line, Dreyfuss said that the new guidelines "make me vomit". He explained that he was opposed to the guidelines because movie-making is "an art form ... and no one should be telling me as an artist that I have to give in to the latest, most current idea of what morality is."

During a screening of Jaws at The Cabot theater in Beverly, Massachusetts, on May 27, 2024, Dreyfuss disparaged "diversity initiatives", and launched into what was described as a transphobic, misogynistic, homophobic, and sexist rant, causing many attendees to heckle the actor, and many to leave the venue in disgust. According to eyewitnesses, Dreyfuss mocked the MeToo and LGBTQ movements and expressed contempt for parents of transgender children, suggesting that supporting a child's transition was indicative of bad parenting.

== Works and accolades ==
=== Bibliography ===
- Dreyfuss, Richard. (2022) One Thought Scares Me...: We Teach Our Children What We Wish Them to Know; We Don't Teach Our Children What We Don't Wish Them to Know. New York: Skyhorse Publishing. ISBN 978-1-5107-7612-8
- Dreyfuss, Richard (with Harry Turtledove). (1996) The Two Georges. New York: Tor Books. ISBN 978-0-3128-5969-5

=== Awards and nominations ===
Year	Association	Category	Nominated work	Result	Ref.
1974	Golden Globe Awards	Best Actor – Motion Picture Musical or Comedy	American Graffiti	Nominated	
1974	New York Film Critics Circle Awards	Best Actor	The Apprenticeship of Duddy Kravitz	Nominated	
1976	BAFTA Awards	Best Actor in a Leading Role	Jaws	Nominated	
1977	Los Angeles Film Critics Association	Best Actor	The Goodbye Girl	Won	
1978	Academy Awards	Best Actor	The Goodbye Girl	Won	
1978	Golden Globe Awards	Best Actor – Motion Picture Musical or Comedy	The Goodbye Girl	Won	
1978	Kansas City Film Critics Circle	Best Actor	The Goodbye Girl	Won	
1978	David di Donatello	Best Foreign Actor	The Goodbye Girl	Won	
1978	Saturn Awards	Best Actor	Close Encounters of the Third Kind	Nominated	
1979	BAFTA Awards	Best Actor in a Leading Role	The Goodbye Girl	Won	
1981	Razzie Awards	Worst Actor	The Competition	Nominated	
1988	Golden Globe Awards	Best Supporting Actor – Motion Picture	Nuts	Nominated	
1996	Academy Awards	Best Actor	Mr. Holland's Opus	Nominated	
1996	Golden Globe Awards	Best Actor – Motion Picture Drama	Mr. Holland's Opus	Nominated	
2002	Satellite Awards	Best Actor – Miniseries or Television Film	The Day Reagan Was Shot	Won	
2002	Screen Actors Guild Awards	Outstanding Actor in a Miniseries or Television Movie	The Day Reagan Was Shot	Nominated	
2002	Screen Actors Guild Awards	Outstanding Actor in a Drama Series	The Education of Max Bickford	Nominated	
2004	Film Critics Circle of Australia	Best Actor	The Old Man Who Read Love Stories	Nominated	
2010	Ride of Fame	Ride of Fame	Life's work	Won	
2011	Saturn Awards	Best Guest Starring Role on Television	Weeds	Won	
2015	FEST	Belgrade Winner	Award for lifetime contribution to the art of film	Won	

== See also ==
- List of oldest and youngest Academy Award winners and nominees — Youngest winners for Best Lead Actor
- List of actors with Academy Award nominations
- List of actors with more than one Academy Award nomination in the acting categories
- List of Golden Globe winners
