= Aharon Ipalé =

Israeli actor

- אהרון איפלה
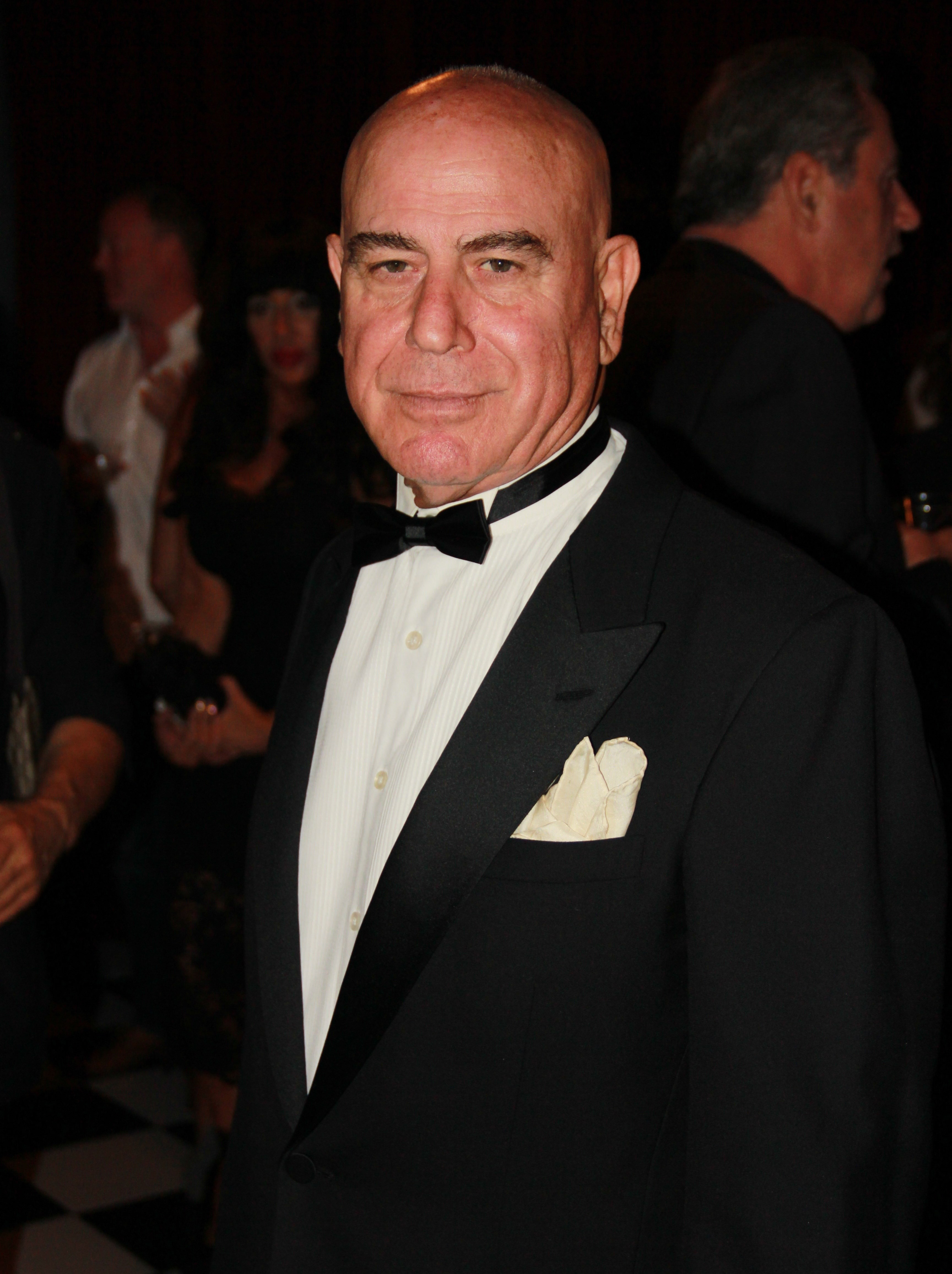
- Ipalé at the Bel Air Film Festival in 2014
- Born: December 27, 1941; Morocco
- Died: June 27, 2016 (aged 74); Tel Hashomer, Israel
- Other name: Ron Ipale
- Occupation: Actor
- Years active: 1963–2015
- Spouse: Rachelle F. Ellison (1978–?)
- Children: 1

Aharon Ipalé (Hebrew: אהרון איפלה; December 27, 1941 – June 27, 2016) was an Israeli-American actor, known for his roles in American and British film and television productions. His credits included Fiddler on the Roof (1971), Innocent Bystanders (1972), Raid on Entebbe (1977), Too Hot to Handle (1977), The Concorde ... Airport '79 (1979), The Happy Hooker Goes Hollywood (1980), Xanadu (1980), Who Dares Wins (1982), Eye of the Widow (1991), Son of the Pink Panther (1993), The Mummy (1999), and The Mummy Returns (2001).

== Early life ==
Ipalé was born in Morocco on December 27, 1941. He arrived in Mandatory Palestine with his family when he was just two years old as part of the early migration of Moroccan Jews to Israel. Ipalé enrolled in a theater school in London following his service in the Israeli Army.

== Career ==
He began his acting career by appearing in British television series and theater productions, including the television mini-series, Christ Recrucified, in which he played the title role of Jesus Christ.

Ipalé was cast as Joshua in the 1973–1974 British mini-series, Moses the Lawgiver, which starred Burt Lancaster as Moses. His work in Moses the Lawgiver earned attention from Hollywood and led to his later work in the United States. His American television credits during the 1970s and 1980s included Hawaii Five-O, Wonder Woman, Dynasty, Kojak, The Love Boat, Taxi, Knight Rider, MacGyver, Miami Vice and Charlie's Angels. In Knight Rider, he played the role of Durant, the man who killed Michael Knight's fiancé Stephanie Maison, at the ceremony of his wedding, in the season four episode, "Scent of Roses".

In 1985, Ipalé appeared in the British dramatic film, The Shooting Party, which starred James Mason and John Gielgud. That same year, Ipalé appeared in the Israeli film, Gesher Tzar Me’od (1985). Two years later, he co-starred in the 1987 film, Ishtar, which was a notorious critical and box-office failure. More recently, Ipalé was best known for his recurring role as Pharaoh Seti I in The Mummy and its sequel, The Mummy Returns, both of which were directed by Stephen Sommers. In 2007, he appeared in Charlie Wilson's War.

Ipalé returned to Israel around 2012 after decades residing and working in London and Los Angeles. However, he was unable to recreate the professional success in Israel that he had enjoyed abroad.

== Death ==
Aharon Ipalé died from cancer at Sheba Medical Center in Tel Hashomer on June 27, 2016, at the age of 74. He was being treated for the disease for several months. Ipalé, who was survived by his daughter, was buried in Holon.

== Filmography ==
=== Film ===
Year	Title	Role	Notes
1970	Madron	Singer	Uncredited
1971	Fiddler on the Roof	Sheftel	
1972	Innocent Bystanders	Gabrilovitch	
1977	Too Hot to Handle	Domingo De La Torres	
1979	The Concorde ... Airport '79	French Reporter	
1980	The Happy Hooker Goes Hollywood	Raul	
1980	Xanadu	Photographer	
1982	Who Dares Wins	Malek	AKA: The Final Option
1985	Gesher Tzar Me'od	Benny	AKA: On a Narrow Bridge
1985	The Shooting Party	Sir Reuben Hergesheimer	
1987	Ishtar	Emir Yousef	
1988	Vibes	Alejandro De La Vivar	
1989	One Man Out	General	
1991	Eye of the Widow	Soltaneh	
1993	American Ninja V	Dr. Strobel	
1993	Son of the Pink Panther	General Jaffar	
1993	Invisible: The Chronicles of Benjamin Knight	Petroff	
1997	A Kid in Aladdin's Palace	Aladdin	
1999	The Mummy	Pharaoh Seti I	
2001	The Mummy Returns	Pharaoh Seti I	
2006	The Ten Commandments: The Musical	Seti	
2007	Charlie Wilson's War	Egyptian Defense Minister	
2016	The Promise	Dr. Nazim	Final film role

=== Television ===
Year	Title	Role	Notes
1976	Raid on Entebbe	Major David Grut	TV movie
1978	The Immigrants	Joseph Lavetta	TV movie
1978	Hawaii Five-O	Rashid	Episode: "My Friend, the Enemy"
1978	Taxi	Ramon	Episode: "Sugar Mama"
1978	One Day at a Time	Abdul Ben Halmi	Episode: "The Arab Connection"
1986	The Equalizer	Gustav Herant	Episode: ”Breakpoint"
1986	The Equalizer	Hector Kouros	Episode: "Heartstrings"
2013	The Bible	Pharaoh	TV miniseries documentary
