= The Colgate Comedy Hour =

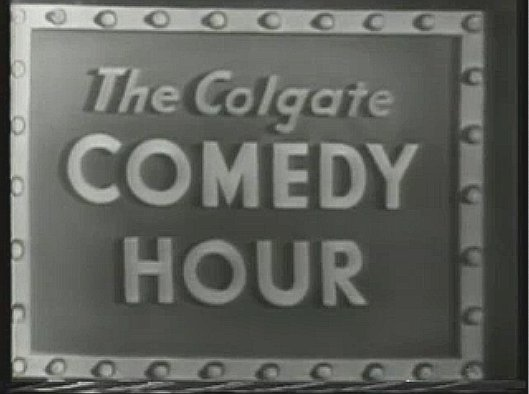
- Title card from 1950
- Also known as: Colgate Summer Comedy Hour; Colgate Variety Hour
- Genre: Comedy/Variety
- Created by: Fred Hamilton
- Directed by: William Asher; Bob Finkel; Fred Hamilton; Ernest D. Glucksman; Jim Jordan; Kingman T. Moore; Ed Sobol; James V. Kern; Bud Yorkin
- Country of origin: United States
- Original language: English
- No. of seasons: 6
- No. of episodes: 221

Production
- Executive producers: Samuel Fuller; Pete Barnum
- Producers: Charles Friedman; Ernest D. Glucksman; Leo Morgan; Ed Sobol; Michael Todd; Pete Barnum
- Camera setup: Multi-camera
- Running time: 50 minutes
- Production company: Colgate-Palmolive-Peet

Original release
- Network: NBC
- Release: September 10, 1950 – December 25, 1955

The Colgate Comedy Hour is an American comedy-musical variety series that aired live on the NBC network from 1950 to 1955. The show featured many notable comedians and entertainers of the era as guest stars. Many of the scripts of the series are archived at the UCLA Library in their Special Collections.

== Synopsis ==
The program evolved from NBC's first TV variety showcase, Four Star Revue, sponsored by Motorola. The "running gag" sketches were dropped in favor of more performing acts. The weekly show was proposed to be hosted by four comedians in a four-week rotation to provide competition for Ed Sullivan's Toast of the Town on CBS. The first episode, starring Hans Conried, Rosemary DeCamp and Dick Foran, was written and produced by the then 22-year-old Peggy Webber, who appeared in over 100 episodes of Dragnet with Jack Webb.

The new format was heavily backed by its sponsor, Colgate-Palmolive, to the tune of $3 million in the first year, and the 8:00 p.m. ET, Sunday evening format show was a spectacular success, particularly for Eddie Cantor and the Martin & Lewis and Abbott & Costello duos. In his autobiography, Jerry Lewis wrote that the show premiered Sunday, September 17, 1950, with Martin & Lewis and was telecast from the Park Theatre off Columbus Circle in New York City. However, Martin and Lewis hosted the second broadcast; the show debuted on Sept. 10 with Eddie Cantor hosting.

As theatres are known by different names over history, it is possible that this was the now-demolished International Theatre at 5 Columbus Circle, the broadcast location of another NBC show of the era, Your Show of Shows with Sid Caesar and Imogene Coca.

During the 1950–51 season, AT&T put into regular service a coast-to-coast coaxial/microwave interconnection service which allowed live telecasts from across the nation. Three production units were quickly set up, one in New York City, one in Chicago, and one in Los Angeles. Martin & Lewis and Abbott & Costello anchored the West Coast, broadcasting from the El Capitan Theater in Hollywood (today known as Avalon Hollywood; other shows that originated here include The Hollywood Palace), while Eddie Cantor anchored from New York City. This gave NBC a substantial edge over Ed Sullivan, since top-grade talent from motion pictures could also do network TV on the West Coast Colgate Comedy Hour, while Sullivan had to work with whoever happened to be in New York City at the time that a particular episode aired.

During the 1952–53 season, Cantor suffered a heart attack immediately after a Colgate Comedy Hour broadcast in September. Although he quickly recovered and returned in January 1953, he was reluctant to move on with the show. By the fourth season, the sponsor was providing $6,000,000, but the performers were finding difficulty in offering fresh material. Ratings hence began to decline. Cantor had become too ill to continue in the hosting role, and the travel was too stressful and painful for him. His final Colgate appearance was in May 1954. Vic Schoen was hired as the musical director in 1954.

In 1954, Tony Martinez, later cast as the farmhand on The Real McCoys, made his television debut on The Colgate Comedy Hour.

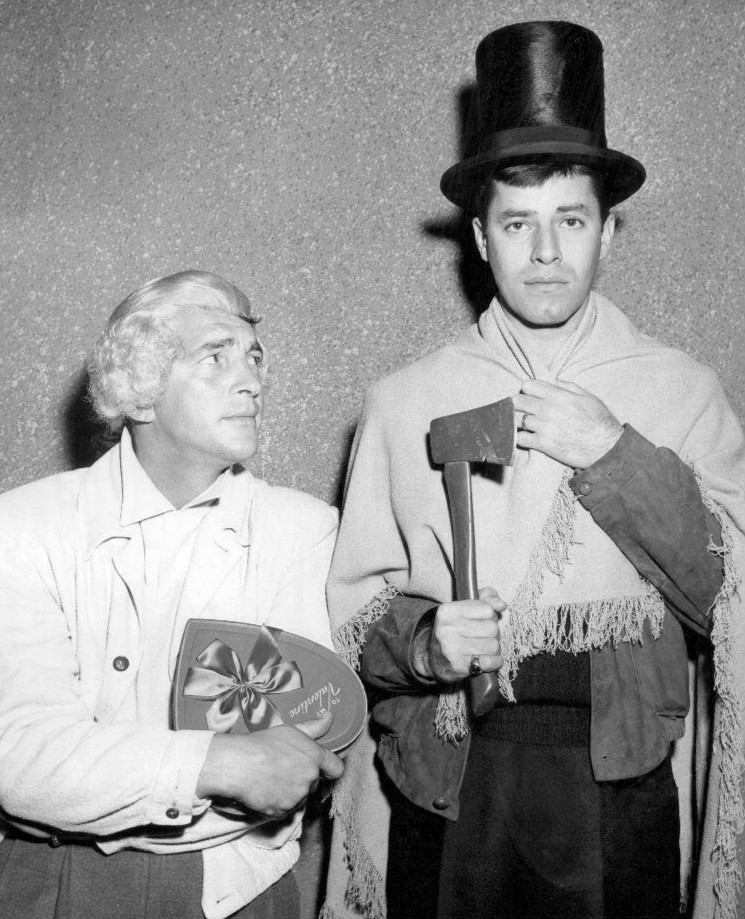
Martin and Lewis in a February 1955 skit from the show

=== Colgate Variety Hour ===
In June 1955, the show changed its name to the Colgate Variety Hour to reflect a move away from pure comedy. An affiliation with Paramount Pictures resulted in episodes featuring scenes from new films and appearances by stars of the featured films. Charlton Heston was the host of several episodes in the new format. A number of the earlier hosts had left by the end of the 1953–54 season (with the exception of Martin & Lewis) as the show shifted toward mini-musicals, starring hosts including Ethel Merman and Frank Sinatra, who paired together in truncated version of Cole Porter's "Anything Goes". The show was also performing on the road, unlike other seasons where the shows were transmitted from New York City or Los Angeles at 8 p.m. Gordon MacRae often served as host during this period. On December 11, 1955, Sam Levene guest starred in a Salute to George Abbott. Recurring guest stars included Pat Sheehan, Joy Langstaff, Doris Gildart, and Connie Russell.

However, ratings continued to slide while The Ed Sullivan Show got stronger. The final show, emceed by the series' last continuing host Robert Paige, aired as a Christmas special on December 25, 1955, with Fred Waring and his "Pennsylvanians" choral ensemble. The Colgate Comedy Hour was replaced on January 8, 1956, with the NBC Comedy Hour, hosted by Leo Durocher for the first three shows. After Durocher, the regular hosts changed, and after 18 broadcasts, the final show aired in June. Regular supporting casts always co-starred in each of the episodes. Jonathan Winters was featured on the show. On May 11, 1967, NBC broadcast a special Colgate Comedy Hour revival (pre-empting The Dean Martin Show, which Colgate sponsored at the time), with guests Nanette Fabray, Kaye Ballard, Edie Adams, Carl Reiner and Mel Brooks (performing one of their "2000 Year Old Man" routines, which they initially ceased doing on albums in the early 1960s), Phyllis Diller, Bob Newhart, Nipsey Russell, and Dan Rowan and Dick Martin. None of the performers who had performed in the original 1950–1956 shows appeared. The special, produced by George Schlatter, also served as a television pilot for a possible revival of the series, which never happened.

In the 1954–1955 season, Donald O'Connor left the show and starred in his own musical situation comedy, The Donald O'Connor Show, which aired on the NBC Saturday schedule alternating with The Jimmy Durante Show.

Notable guest stars who went on to find success in entertainment included Vera Miles, costar of Alfred Hitchcock's thriller Psycho, Bob Fosse, later a noted choreographer and director who won multiple Tonys and an Academy Award for his work, and a child-age Christopher Walken, who became an Oscar-winning actor and screen star, appeared alongside Jerry Lewis in a sketch (albeit under his given name, Ronald).

Kinescopes of the 28 shows hosted by Martin & Lewis have been airing Saturday evenings on the classic television network RTV since June 30, 2012.

== Color ==
The episode broadcast on November 22, 1953, hosted by Donald O'Connor, was the first color television broadcast in the NTSC color system (used in the U.S. until the change to digital in June 2009). There were few other color broadcasts in the 1953–1954 season, and all of them were transmitted by NBC. The series was also used earlier in the season to demonstrate the final form of RCA's "Compatible" color system to members of the Federal Communications Commission (FCC). Two sets were in the room: an experimental color model and a standard black-and-white unit. Eddie Cantor hosted the program with guests including Frank Sinatra, Eddie Fisher, and Brian Donlevy.

== Ratings ==
- Season 1: #4
- Season 2: #5
- Season 3: #7
- Season 4: #10
- Season 5: #27

== Episodes ==
Season	Episodes	Season premiere	Season finale
1	42	September 10, 1950	June 24, 1951
2	42	September 2, 1951	June 15, 1952
3	39	September 21, 1952	June 14, 1953
4	49	October 4, 1953	September 5, 1954
5	39	September 19, 1954	September 4, 1955
6	12	September 18, 1955	December 25, 1955
