= Teri Hope =

American model and actress (1938–2023)

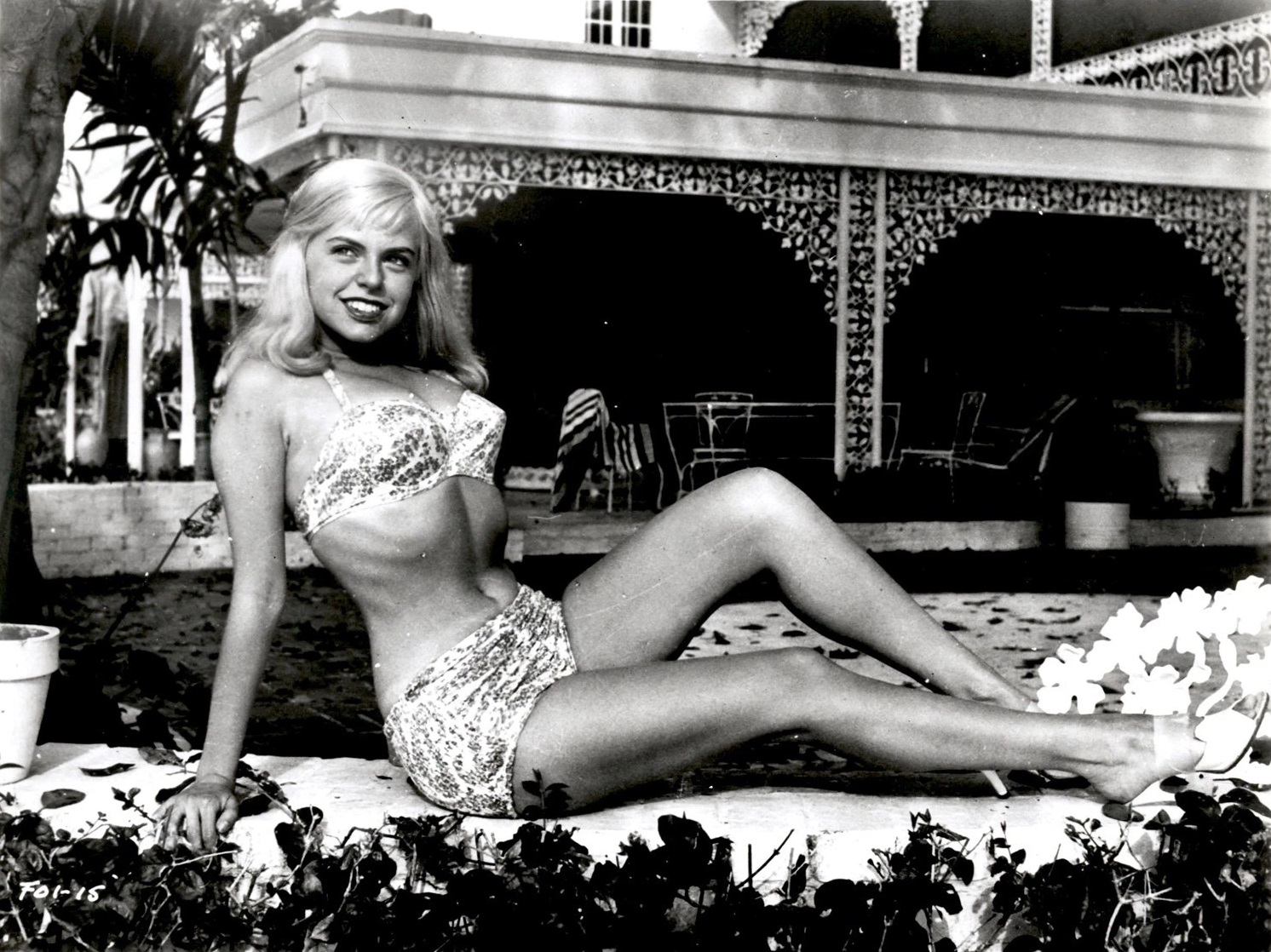
- Hope in Force of Impulse (1961)

Playboy centerfold appearance
- September 1958
- Preceded by: Myrna Weber
- Succeeded by: Mara Corday, Pat Sheehan

Personal details
- Born: Natalie Hope Reisberg; February 19, 1938 Kittanning, Pennsylvania, U.S.
- Died: September 26, 2023 (aged 85) Albuquerque, New Mexico, U.S.
- Height: 5 ft 2 in (1.57 m)

Teri Hope (born Natalie Hope Reisberg, February 19, 1938 – September 26, 2023) was an American model and actress. She was Playboy magazine's Playmate of the Month for the September 1958 issue. Her centerfold was photographed by Don Bronstein and Mike Shea.

== Biography ==
Hope was born on February 19, 1938. She attended Carnegie Tech in Pittsburgh, Pennsylvania. While attending a Playboy-themed party at the Beta Sigma Rho (now merged with Pi Lambda Phi) fraternity house, chapter members proclaimed her the "Party Playmate" and submitted her photos to Playboy.

Hope went on to enjoy a modest acting career in the 1960s, including appearances in two Elvis Presley movies, 1963's Fun in Acapulco and 1964's Roustabout.

Teri Hope was married to Jay Redack and died in Albuquerque, New Mexico, on September 26, 2023, at the age of 85.

== Filmography ==
=== Films ===
- Pajama Party (1964)
- Roustabout (1964) (uncredited) as College student
- Fun in Acapulco (1963) as Janie Harkins
- Gypsy (1962) (uncredited)
- Force of Impulse (1961) as Bunny Reese

=== Television ===
- Hennesey - "The Best Man" (1962) (credited as Terry Hope) as Nurse
- The Gertrude Berg Show
  - "Dad's Day" (1962-03-29) (credited as Terry Hope) as Susan
  - "Goodbye, Mr. Howell" (1962-02-15) (credited as Teri Hope) as Susan

== See also ==
- List of people in Playboy 1953–1959

Elizabeth Ann Roberts	Cheryl Kubert	Zahra Norbo	Felicia Atkins	Lari Laine	Judy Lee Tomerlin
Linné Ahlstrand	Myrna Weber	Teri Hope	Mara Corday, Pat Sheehan	Joan Staley	Joyce Nizzari
