= Force of Impulse =

Film directed by Saul Swimmer

- US film poster
- Directed by: Saul Swimmer
- Screenplay by: Francis Swann
- Story by: Saul Swimmer; Tony Anthony; Adaptation: Richard N. Bernstein
- Produced by: Peter Gayle; Tony Anthony
- Starring: Robert Alda; J. Carrol Naish; Tony Anthony; Jeff Donnell; Jody McCrea; Lionel Hampton; Brud Talbot; Teri Hope
- Cinematography: Clifford H. Poland Jr.
- Edited by: Gene Milford
- Music by: Joseph Liebman
- Production companies: Gayle-Swimmer-Anthony Productions; III Task Productions
- Distributed by: Sutton Pictures Corporation
- Release date: November 1, 1961
- Running time: 84 minutes
- Country: United States
- Language: English

Force of Impulse is a 1961 American drama film directed by Saul Swimmer and starring Robert Alda, Jeff Donnell and J. Carrol Naish. A high school student robs his own father's grocery store in order to raise the money to take his girlfriend out.

== Cast ==
- Robert Alda as Warren Reese
- J. Carrol Naish as Antonio Marino
- Tony Anthony as Toby Marino
- Jeff Donnell as Louise Reese
- Jody McCrea as Phil Anderson
- Brud Talbot as George
- Lionel Hampton as Himself
- Christina Crawford as Ann
- Kathy Barr as Kathy
- Teri Hope as Bunny Reese
- Paul Daniel as Uncle Luigi

== Novelization ==
Slightly in advance of the film's release, as was the custom of the era, a paperback novelization of the film was published by Popular Library. The author was renowned crime and western novelist Marvin H. Albert, who also made something of a cottage industry out of movie tie-ins. He seems to have been the most prolific screenplay novelizer of the late '50s through mid '60s, and, during that time, the preeminent specialist at light comedy.

== Bibliography ==
- McCarty, Clifford. Film Composers in America: A Filmography, 1911-1970. Oxford University Press, 2000.
