= Pat Sheehan (model) =

American model, actress (1931–2006)

Playboy centerfold appearance
- October 1958
- Preceded by: Teri Hope
- Succeeded by: Joan Staley

Personal details
- Born: Patricia Ann Sheehan; September 7, 1931 San Francisco, California, U.S.
- Died: January 14, 2006 (aged 74) Beverly Hills, California, U.S.
- Height: 5 ft 6 in (168 cm)

Patricia Ann Sheehan (September 7, 1931 – January 14, 2006), also known as Patricia Sheehan Crosby, was an American actress and model. She was Playboy magazine's Playmate of the Month for October 1958 and a contract player for NBC.

== Early years ==
She was born to Arthur E. Sheehan Sr. and Gladys A. Larson. She had two brothers, Edward Sheehan and Arthur Sheehan Jr. In October 1949, she gained public attention by winning the local Miss Milkmaid pageant, which helped launch her career in public appearances and pageantry.

In 1950, she was crowned Miss San Francisco after performing a dramatic monologue. As part of her prize, she received a Gensler Lee diamond ring. She later competed in the 1951 Miss California Pageant in Santa Cruz, California, where she placed sixth.

On January 9, 1951, she married George von Duuglas-Ittu in Carson City, Nevada. Their son, Franz Nicholas Gregory von Duuglas-Ittu, was born on October 21, 1951. The couple divorced on January 6, 1954.

== Career ==
Pat Sheehan began appearing on Queen for a Day and the Colgate Comedy Hour in the early 1950s, as well as modeling for various magazines. She was discovered by Howard Hughes who signed her for his films The French Line and Son of Sinbad. She posed for magazines such as TV Fan, People Today, and TV Guide.

She was in movies such as Kismet, Man with the Gun, Daddy Long Legs, and The Adventures of Hajji Baba.

She was signed to NBC in January 1956, starring in The NBC Comedy Hour, with appearances on The Milton Berle Show, Texaco Star Theater, and The Chevy Show. Agnes Moorehead was her acting coach during this period, while Meredith Willson was her vocal coach. Her co-star, Jonathan Winters said of her, "Pat Sheehan? Lovely, yes, lovely." She appeared in an episode of Blondie and had a dramatic role in an episode of Matinee Theater.

She was Playboy magazine's Playmate of the Month for October 1958, tied with Mara Corday. Her centerfold was photographed by Sam Wu. Her centerfold was in Space Cowboys. Gigi was her last movie, in 1958.

She dated Frank Sinatra, Phillip Lambro, and Rod Taylor. Shortly after Bing Crosby's first wife, Dixie Lee, died of ovarian cancer, he started dating Sheehan. Eventually, Crosby proposed to her. On May 4, 1958, she married Crosby's son, Dennis Crosby in Las Vegas, Nevada at The Tropicana Hotel where she was a showgirl. They had two children: Dennis Jr. and Patrick Anthony, and Franz Nicholas Gregory who Dennis adopted from the previous marriage in December 1958, rechristened Gregory Crosby. They divorced on July 3, 1964.

== Later life ==
In her later years, Sheehan lived in Beverly Hills, California with her friend Gloria Haley Parnassus (Jack Haley's daughter). She was employed with Gucci, and did her last interview in 1995 for The Playmate Book: Five Decades of Centerfolds. After surviving cancer, she died of a heart attack on January 14, 2006, in Beverly Hills, aged 74 and was interred at Forest Lawn Memorial Park. Her sons, Dennis and Patrick, died years later.

== Legacy ==
In addition to being the first Playmate to tie for Playboy's Playmate of the Month, Pat Sheehan was the first bit player to be signed to a television contract. She was known as one of Hollywood's most beautiful women, often being labeled as "Television's Marilyn Monroe" and "The Blonde Rita Hayworth." Mike Connolly described her as "The Rich Man's Jayne Mansfield" while they performed alongside each other in The Tropicana Holiday. Kathryn Crosby described her as "the warmest, friendliest girl I've ever known." On April 26, 2019, she was posthumously inducted into the Galileo Academy of Science and Technology Hall of Merit. A lot of her photographs, memorabilia, and footage are archived at the San Francisco History Center, the San Francisco Public Library, the Bancroft Library, and the Los Angeles Public Library.

== Filmography ==
Year	Title	Role	Notes
1954	The French Line	Model	uncredited
1954	The Adventures of Hajji Baba	Handmaiden	uncredited
1955	Kismet	Harem Girl	uncredited
1955	Daddy Long Legs (film)	Jervis' Date	uncredited
1955	Son of Sinbad	Harem Girl	uncredited
1955	Guys and Dolls	one of the Hot Box Girls	Goldwyn Girl, uncredited
1955	Man with the Gun	Blonde	uncredited
1958	Gigi	Blonde	uncredited
2000	Space Cowboys	Cameo	

== Television ==
- Queen for a Day (recurring episodes, 1952-1953), Model
- The Bob Hope Show (recurring episodes, 1954) Dancer
- Place the Face (1955) TV Episode
- The Colgate Comedy Hour, episodes #5.19 and 6.7 (1955) TV Episodes, Mildred
- The NBC Comedy Hour 1.5, 1.6, 1.7, 1.10, and 1.17 (5 episodes, 1956) TV episode, Herself
- The Milton Berle Show (recurring episodes, 1956), Dancer
- The Jimmy Durante Show (recurring episodes, 1955-1956), Dancer
- Inside Beverly Hills (1956) TV Episode, Self
- Salute to Baseball (1956) TV Episode, Self
- Home (May 24, 1956) TV Episode, Self
- The Chevy Show (1956) TV Episode, Dancer
- Matinee Theater (March 1956 and April 12, 1956) TV Episodes, Bohemian Artist
- The George Gobel Show (1956) TV Episodes, Blonde
- Truth or Consequences (1956-1957) TV Episodes, Self
- People are Funny (1957) TV Episode, Miss Univac
- Blondie (1 episode, 1957) The Other Woman (1957) TV Episode Librarian,

== See also ==
- List of people in Playboy 1953–1959
- Dean Martin

== Bibliography ==
- Claesson, Samuel (2026). Pat: A Biography of Hollywood's Blonde Starlet. Sequoia Press. ISBN 979-8-9060-0374-4.

Elizabeth Ann Roberts	Cheryl Kubert	Zahra Norbo	Felicia Atkins	Lari Laine	Judy Lee Tomerlin
Linné Ahlstrand	Myrna Weber	Teri Hope	Mara Corday, Pat Sheehan	Joan Staley	Joyce Nizzari
