= List of performances by Richard Dreyfuss =

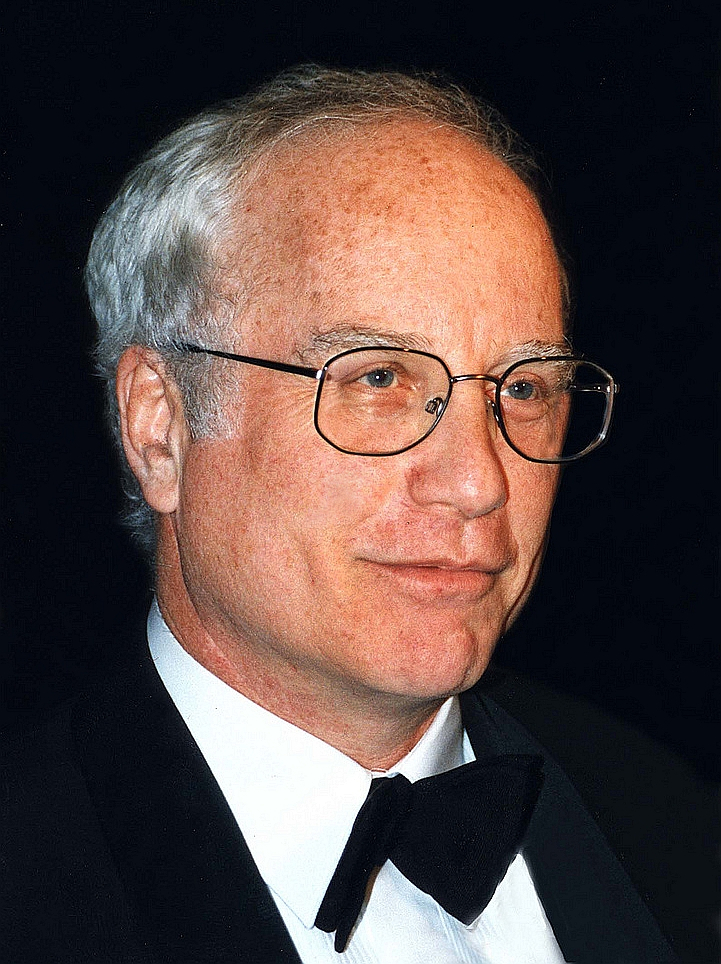
Dreyfuss at the Kennedy Center in 1997

Richard Dreyfuss is an American actor. He won the Academy Award for Best Actor for his leading role in The Goodbye Girl (1977), and was Oscar-nominated in the same category for his portrayal of the title character in Mr. Holland's Opus (1995).

Dreyfuss' many other film credits include American Graffiti, Dillinger (both 1973), The Apprenticeship of Duddy Kravitz (1974), Jaws (1975), Close Encounters of the Third Kind (1977), The Big Fix (1978), The Competition (1980), Whose Life Is It Anyway? (1981), Stand by Me, Down and Out in Beverly Hills (both 1986), Tin Men, Stakeout, Nuts (all 1987), Always (1989), Postcards from the Edge (1990), What About Bob? (1991), The American President (1995), James and the Giant Peach (1996), Poseidon (2006), and W. (2008).

== Acting credits ==
=== Film ===
Year	Film	Role	Notes
1967	Valley of the Dolls	Assistant Stage Manager	Uncredited
1967	The Graduate	Boarding House Resident	Uncredited
1968	The Young Runaways	Terry	
1969	Hello Down There	Harold Webster	
1973	American Graffiti	Curt Henderson	
1973	Dillinger	Baby Face Nelson	
1974	The Apprenticeship of Duddy Kravitz	Duddy Kravitz	
1974	The Second Coming of Suzanne	Clavius	
1975	Inserts	The Boy Wonder	
1975	Jaws	Matthew "Matt" Hooper	
1977	Close Encounters of the Third Kind	Roy Neary	
1977	The Goodbye Girl	Elliott Garfield	
1978	The Big Fix	Moses Wine	Also producer
1980	The Competition	Paul Dietrich	
1981	Whose Life Is It Anyway?	Ken Harrison	
1984	The Buddy System	Joe	
1986	Down and Out in Beverly Hills	David "Dave" Whiteman	
1986	Stand by Me	Narrator/Gordie LaChance (adult)	
1987	Tin Men	Bill 'BB' Babowsky	
1987	Stakeout	Det. Chris Lecce	
1987	Nuts	Aaron Levinsky	
1988	Moon over Parador	Jack Noah/President Alphonse Simms	
1989	Let It Ride	Jay Trotter	
1989	Always	Pete Sandich	
1990	Rosencrantz & Guildenstern Are Dead	The Player	
1990	Postcards from the Edge	Doctor Frankenthal	
1991	Once Around	Sam Sharpe	Also co-producer
1991	What About Bob?	Leo Marvin	
1993	Lost in Yonkers	Louie Kurnitz	
1993	Another Stakeout	Detective Chris Lecce	
1994	Silent Fall	Jake Rainer	
1995	The Last Word	Larry	
1995	The American President	Senator Bob Rumson	
1995	Mr. Holland's Opus	Glenn Holland	
1996	James and the Giant Peach	Mr. Centipede (voice)	
1996	Mad Dog Time	Vic	
1997	Night Falls on Manhattan	Sam Vigoda	
1998	Krippendorf's Tribe	Prof. James Krippendorf	
2000	The Crew	Bobby Bartellemeo/Narrator	
2001	The Old Man Who Read Love Stories	Antonio Bolivar	
2001	Who Is Cletis Tout?	Micah Donnelly	
2001	Rudolph the Red-Nosed Reindeer and the Island of Misfit Toys	Scoop T. Snowman (voice)	
2001	Venus Storm	President Harrison Vance	
2004	Silver City	Chuck Raven	
2006	Poseidon	Richard Nelson	
2008	Signs of the Time	Narrator	Documentary
2008	W.	Dick Cheney	
2008	America Betrayed	Narrator	Documentary
2009	My Life in Ruins	Irv	
2009	Leaves of Grass	Pug Rothbaum	
2009	The Lightkeepers	Seth	Also executive producer
2010	Piranha 3D	Matthew Boyd	
2010	Red	Alexander Dunning	
2012	Casting By	Himself	Documentary
2013	Paranoia	Francis Cassidy	
2013	Cas and Dylan	Cas Pepper	
2014	Very Good Girls	Danny Fields	
2014	Squatters	David	
2015	Zipper	George Hiller	
2018	Book Club	George	
2018	Bayou Caviar	Yuri	
2018	Asher	Avi	
2019	The Last Laugh	Buddy Green	
2019	Polar	Porter	
2019	Daughter of the Wolf	Father	
2019	Astronaut	Angus	
2020	Audrey	Himself	Documentary
2021	Crime Story	Ben Myers	
2021	Every Last One of Them	Murphy	
2022	Murder at Yellowstone City	Edgar Blake	
2023	Sweetwater	Maurice Podoloff	
2024	Waltzing with Brando	Seymour Kraft	
2025	Into the Deep	Seamus	

=== Television ===
Year	Work	Role	Notes
1964	Karen	David Rowe III	Episode: "Karen's Simplicity Complex"
1965	Peyton Place	Cap and Gown Student (uncredited)	Episode: 1/94
1966	Gidget	Norman	Episode: "Ego-a-Go-Go"
1966	Bewitched	Rodney	Episode: "Man's Best Friend"
1967	The Big Valley	Lud Akley	Episode: "Boy Into Man"
1967	That Girl	Johnny Arthur; Waiter	Episode: "Paper Hats and Everything"
1968	Judd, for the Defense	Larry Corning	Episode: "Weep the Hunter Home"
1969	The Ghost & Mrs. Muir	Mark Finley	Episode: "Buried on Page One"
1970, 1973	The Mod Squad	Curtis Bell / Caleb Dunne	2 episodes
1972	The Shadow of a Gun	Tommy Owens	Television film
1973	Gunsmoke	Gearshon Gorofsky	Episode: "This Golden Land"
1973	A Touch of Grace	Donald	Episode: "The Accident"
1973	Me	Greg	Hollywood Television Theater; later retitled Untold Damage
1973	The New Dick Van Dyke Show	Tony Injijikian	Episode: "Mr. Dazzle"
1976	Victory at Entebbe	Colonel Yonatan 'Yoni' Netanyahu	Television film
1987	Funny, You Don't Look 200: A Constitutional Vaudeville	Himself (host)	ABC special
1991	Prisoner of Honor	Col. Picquart	Television film; also producer
1994	Shelley Duvall's Bedtime Stories	Narrator	Episode: Moe, the Dog in Tropical Paradise/Amos
1997	Oliver Twist	Fagin	Television film; also producer
1999	Lansky	Meyer Lansky	Television film
2000	Fail Safe	President of the United States	Television film
2001–2002	The Education of Max Bickford	Max Bickford	22 episodes; also producer
2001	Mr. Dreyfuss Goes to Washington	Himself (host)	History Channel special
2001	The Day Reagan Was Shot	Alexander Haig	Television film
2003	Coast to Coast	Barnaby Pierce	Television film
2007	Tin Man	Mystic Man	Miniseries; 3 episodes
2007	Ocean of Fear	Narrator	TV documentary
2009–2010	Family Guy	Himself (voice)	2 episodes
2010	Weeds	Warren Schiff	4 episodes
2011	Parenthood	Gilliam T. Blount	4 episodes
2012	Coma	Professor Hillside	Miniseries; 2 episodes
2015	Blood and Glory: The Civil War in Color	Himself	4 episodes
2015	Your Family or Mine	Louis	Series regular; 7 episodes
2016	Madoff	Bernie Madoff	Miniseries; 4 episodes
2017	Shots Fired	Arlen Cox	Miniseries; 9 episodes
2017	Hit the Road	James	Episode: "Gone Daddy, Gone"
2020	The Great British Bake Off	Himself (contestant)	Stand Up to Cancer celebrity special
2022	Bubble Guppies	Captain Acrab (voice)	Episode: "The Jaw-some Sharkventure!"

=== Theatre ===
Year	Work	Role	Location
1983	Total Abandon	Lenny Keller	Broadway
1992	Death and the Maiden	Gerardo Escobar	Broadway
2004	Sly Fox	Foxwell J. Sly	Broadway
2004	The Producers	Max Bialystock	West End
2007	Prophesy and Honor	Congressman Frank R. Reid	Hawaii Theatre

== See also ==
- List of oldest and youngest Academy Award winners and nominees — Youngest winners for Best Lead Actor
- List of actors with Academy Award nominations
- List of actors with more than one Academy Award nomination in the acting categories
- List of Golden Globe winners
