= Brud Talbot =

American filmmaker

- Born: Joseph Bruce Talbot; September 16, 1938; New York City, US
- Died: November 20, 1986 (aged 48); Boston, Massachusetts, US
- Occupation(s): Film actor, producer, director and writer

Brud Talbot (September 16, 1938 – November 20, 1986) was an American film actor, producer, director and writer.

Talbot played George in Force of Impulse (1961), by Saul Swimmer. He appeared in Finger on the Trigger (1965) along Rory Calhoun and Todd Martin.

Talbot and Ernest Greenberg adapted the autobiography of Willie Sutton Where the Money Was into a film.

== Filmography ==
| Year | Title | Director | Producer | Writer | Actor |
|---|---|---|---|---|---|
| 1973 | Case of the Full Moon Murders | ✓ | ✓ | | |
| 1972 | Run Before the Wind | ✓ | ✓ | ✓ | |
| 1965 | Finger on the Trigger | | | | ✓ |
| 1963 | Wounds of Hunger | | ✓ | | ✓ |
| 1962 | Without Each Other | | | | ✓ |
| 1961 | Force of Impulse | | | | ✓ |
