= Finger on the Trigger (film) =

1965 film by Sidney W. Pink

- VHS cover
- Directed by: Sidney W. Pink
- Written by: Sidney W. Pink
- Screenplay by: Luis de los Arcos
- Story by: Luis de los Arcos; Sidney W. Pink
- Produced by: Sidney W. Pink
- Starring: Rory Calhoun; Aldo Sambrell; James Philbrook; Leo Anchóriz; Todd Martin
- Cinematography: Antonio Macasoli
- Edited by: Margarita de Ochoa
- Music by: José Solá
- Production company: Films Internacionales
- Distributed by: Allied Artists Pictures; Troma Entertainment; Paramount British Pictures; As Films S.A.; Comet Films; Interpeninsular
- Release date: March 22, 1965 (Spain)
- Running time: 90 minutes
- Countries: Spain; United States
- Language: English

Finger on the Trigger (also known as Blue Lightning) is a 1965 Western film directed by Sidney W. Pink and starring Rory Calhoun. It was distributed on VHS by Troma Entertainment.

== Premise ==
At the end of the American Civil War, a group of discharged federal troops travel west to California to settle the free land offered by the US Government to honorably discharged veterans. These veterans clash with a band of renegade Confederates in a deserted town in Oklahoma.

== Cast ==
- Rory Calhoun as Larry Winton
- Aldo Sambrell
- James Philbrook as Adam Hyde
- Leo Anchóriz as Ed Bannister
- Todd Martin as Hillstrom
- Jorge Rigaud as Benton
- Silvia Solar as Violet
- Bruce Talbot as Fred
- Axel Anderson as McNamara
- Fernando Bilbao as Mayer
- Sebastian Cavalieri as Slim
- Eric Chapman as McKay
- John Clarke as Numitah
- Beni Deus as O'Brien
- Guillermo Elias as Mike Daly
- Tito García as Zubarri
- Yvonne Gilbert as Madeline
- German Grech as Delmer
- Antonio Molino Rojo as Benham
- Juan Antonio Peral as Tom Sharpe
- Iván Tubau

== Production ==
The film was financed off the back of the success of Lex Barker's Westerns. The script was written in 12 days. It was an Italian-Spanish co production.

The film was meant to star Victor Mature but he pulled out. Pink later sued Mature. He was paid $25,000. According to Sidney Pink, Mature went on a drunken bender when the actor arrived in London and missed the first three weeks of filming. Mature turned up and demanded to be paid his entire fee and the filmmakers refused. Mature was replaced with Rory Calhoun who shot all his scenes in eight days.

== Reception ==
Pink said the film was a "smash hit in Europe and did extremely well in the states".

== Notes ==
- Pink, Sidney (1989). So you want to make movies : my life as an independent film producer. Pineapple Press.
