= The Abductors (1972 film) =

- Directed by: Don Schain
- Written by: Don Schain
- Starring: Cheri Caffaro
- Production company: Derio
- Release date: January 1972
- Running time: 90 mins
- Country: USA
- Language: English
- Box office: $2.1 million

The Abductors is a 1972 American sexploitation film directed by Don Schain and starring Cheri Caffaro.

The second instalment in the "Ginger" trilogy, it is a sequel to Ginger, and is sometimes referred to as Ginger 2.

== Premise ==
Ginger goes undercover to investigate a white slave ring.

== Reception ==
=== Box office ===
The film made $2.1 million in the US and Canada.

=== Critical reaction ===
In a review for The New York Times, Vincent Canby wrote, "The movie, which could have been very funny, isn't, principally because the demands it makes upon our imaginations are too great. All of the women are idiots. The men look like the sort of people who pose in $42 suits in Sears Roebuck catalogues, and the main set, which is described in my synopsis as a baronial country estate, resembles a suburban garage without A/C. The only reason I bother to take note of it is that it opened yesterday at the DeMille Theater, which occasionally plays real movies." According to Variety, the film "is a clumsy sexploitation" melodrama that "falls in a no-man’s-land of commerciality: too tame for hardcore situations, too raunchy for all others, except the occasional switch-hitter house. Film is accidentally funny to the point of professional embarrassment." The Baltimore Sun also gave the film a negative review, quipping, "The Abductors is a sequel to Ginger, which prior to its release, was soporific champion of the year."

Sight and Sound's review said the film "boasts better production values and props (like a helicopter) [than Ginger,] while repeating the original's formula of grossly manhandled nudes, bondage/rape fantasies and cheap pseudo-Bondian accessories (gas-station road maps handled like top-secret documents; 'radar losenges' for tracking a planted abductee). But ... when the film indulges its star with yet another lengthy dance sequence (this time with a lamely swung maraca), one wonders how such an uninspiring woman could be the centre of her own world, much less everyone else's." A review in Video Movie Guide described the film as follows: "The sequel to Ginger is even nastier as the blonde spy battles a white-slave ring". Other reviews were also very mixed. The website Pulp International judged that "it's bad but interesting; it's surprisingly equal opportunity with its nudity; and it showcases a uniquely brave actress in Caffaro". Reviewing the film's DVD release in 2003, the Winnipeg Free Press called the main character an "oft-naked sex sleuth".
