= The NBC Comedy Hour =

American TV comedy series (1956)

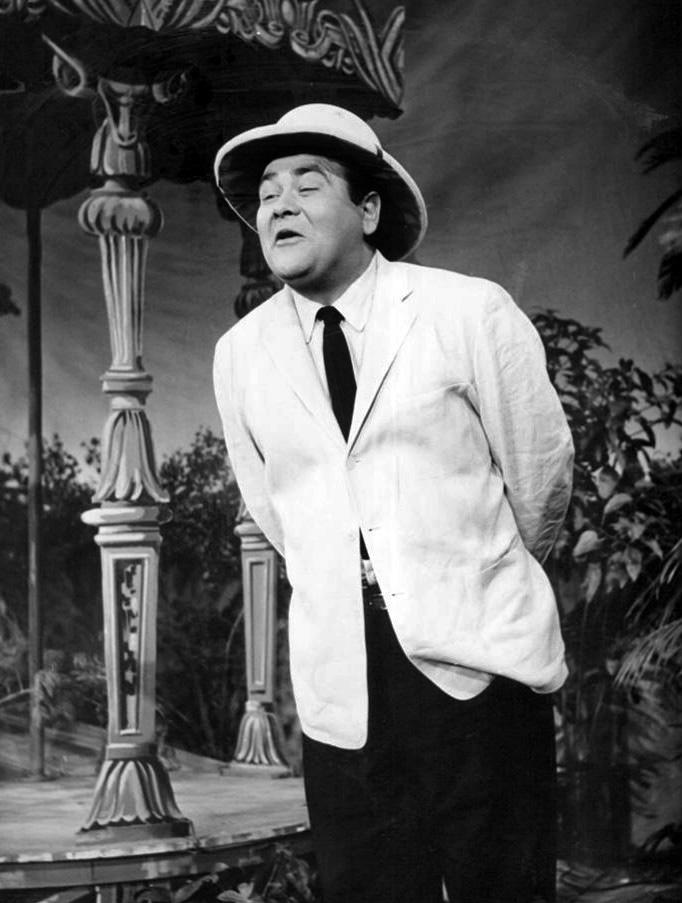
- Jonathan Winters, a host of The NBC Comedy Hour (1956)
- Genre: Television comedy
- Directed by: Herbert Kenwith
- Presented by: Leo Durocher; Gale Storm; various
- Starring: Jonathan Winters, Gale Storm, Pat Sheehan, Stubby Kaye, Shecky Greene, Stan Freberg, and Hy Averback
- Country of origin: United States
- Original language: English
- No. of seasons: 1
- No. of episodes: 18

Production
- Running time: 60 minutes
- Production company: NBC

Original release
- Network: NBC
- Release: January 8 – June 10, 1956

Related
- The Colgate Comedy Hour; The Steve Allen Show

The NBC Comedy Hour was a comedy show that ran on NBC January 8, 1956 - June 10, 1956, as a replacement for The Colgate Comedy Hour.

== Background ==
Robert Welch developed the series, which originally was called New Comedy Hour. He expressed concern over its status as "one show that will be put together without a format". He noted that the show would feature first-rate comedians who would face the challenge of making the audience laugh. Episodes would be fast-paced, he said, each with a minimum of 24 elements including varied acts and comedic personalities with "enough material to make this, we hope, one of the fastest moving shows ever presented".

== Overview ==
Leo Durocher, who initially hosted the show in January, was released from his contract before the January 22, 1956, episode, which had no master of ceremonies. Walter O'Keefe filled that role on February 5, 1956. Gale Storm was the host from February until April 8. (The trade publication Billboard reported that Storm was "scheduled to appear on the March 4 Comedy Hour in addition to serving as femcee of one program in April and in May".)From April 22 on, hosts were called in per episode. Comic Jonathan Winters was a more frequent face than any of the hosts; he appeared in 17 of the 18 episodes. Stan Freberg was also a guest 6 times. Topical comedian Mort Sahl's network debut was on the Comedy Hour. A group of acting chimpanzees named The Marquis Chimps performed parodies of movies in 3 episodes.

Other performers who appeared on the series included Gloria DeHaven, William Bendix, Shecky Greene, June Havoc, Ben Blue, Pat Stanley, Elena Verdugo, Cliff Arquette, Stan Freberg, Bob and Ray, Pat Carroll, Henny Youngman, William Frawley, the Al White Dancers, the Tony Charmoli Dancers, the Gordon Jenkins Orchestra, the Al Goodman Orchestra, and Robin Tyler.

The show was a critical and ratings failure: Variety stated about the series's second episode, "A more poorly conceived, routined and paced outing would be difficult to imagine." It was cancelled in June, having already been pre-empted 4 times in 5 months. It was succeeded by The Steve Allen Show, whose reputation became a marked contrast to that of The NBC Comedy Hour. The Paley Center for Media has several episodes of the series in their archives.

== Production ==
Sam Fuller was the producer of The NBC Comedy Hour, and Ernest D. Glucksman was the producer. The directors were Glucksman and Jim Jordan. Writers included Irving Elinson, Coleman Jacoby, Robert O'Brien, Arnold Rosen, and Marvin Fischer. Hy Averback was the announcer, and Johnny Mann was the choral director.

Originating live from KRCA-TV, the show was broadcast on Sundays from 8 to 9 p.m. Eastern Time. Its competition included films on ABC and The Ed Sullivan Show on CBS. The sponsors were the Crosley Division of Avco Manufacturing Company, Andrew P. Jergens Company, and Brown & Williamson Tobacco Company.

== Critical response ==
Daniel Richman wrote in The Philadelphia Inquirer that the premiere episode of The NBC Comedy Hour "was probably the worst excuse for a variety show since vaudeville died." He pointed out a "total disregard for the rules of showmanship, pace, timing and everything else that's supposed to go into a thing of this type".

A review distributed by the Associated Press after the first two episodes noted that the first episode's Trendex rating was 15.8, as compared to 34.6 for Sullivan's program, and the second week's ratings were "even more dismal" at 11.8 and 35, respectively. The review suggested that blame for the lack of success could be traced to upper-management at NBC for "moving hastily and without adequate preparation".

The trade publication Sponsor said that the premiere episode "did little to live up to NBC's boast that the Comedy Hour would be a 'showcase of new and promising comics,' and proved once again that there are certain things money can't buy".

A review of the February 5, 1956, episode in Variety said that the show "wasn't particularly funny". It supported that summary by citing specific comedy segments with comments that included "... his various antics became a little tiresome after a while ...", "... some spotty laugh material for an overall weak effect ...", "... three stories, none of which were really rib-ticklers ...", and "... wasn't much of a laugh-getter."
