= The Last House on the Left =

1972 American horror film by Wes Craven

- Theatrical release poster
- Directed by: Wes Craven
- Written by: Wes Craven
- Produced by: Sean S. Cunningham
- Starring: David Hess; Lucy Grantham; Sandra Cassel; Marc Sheffler; Ada Washington
- Cinematography: Victor Hurwitz
- Edited by: Wes Craven
- Music by: David Alexander Hess
- Production companies: Sean S. Cunningham Films; The Night Company; Lobster Enterprises
- Distributed by: Hallmark Releasing; American International Pictures
- Release date: August 30, 1972
- Running time: 84 minutes
- Country: United States
- Language: English
- Budget: $90,000
- Box office: $2,273,000

The Last House on the Left is a 1972 American rape and revenge film written and directed by Wes Craven in his directorial debut, and produced by Sean S. Cunningham. The film stars Sandra Peabody, Lucy Grantham, David Hess, Fred J. Lincoln, Jeramie Rain, and Marc Sheffler. Additionally, Martin Kove appears in a supporting role. The plot follows Mari Collingwood (Peabody), a teenager who is abducted, raped, and brutally murdered by a group of violent fugitives led by Krug Stillo (Hess). When her parents discover what happened to her, they seek vengeance against the killers, who have taken shelter at their home.

Craven based it on the 1960 Swedish film The Virgin Spring, directed by Ingmar Bergman, which in turn is an adaptation of the Swedish ballad "Töres döttrar i Wänge". Cunningham produced the film for $90,000 and used a cast of relatively unknown actors. Distributor Hallmark Releasing, in partnership with American International Pictures, gave him and Craven funding after the box office success of Cunningham's Together (1971).

Craven cut the film numerous times for the MPAA to rate it R. Internationally, the UK refused to certify the film for release, and although it was briefly released on home video in the 1980s, the "video nasty" scare led to its ban until 2002. The Last House on the Left was released in the USA on August 30, 1972. While the film initially received polarized reviews from critics, it was highly profitable, grossing over $3,000,000 at the domestic box office.

Like the exploitation films Night of the Living Dead (1968) and The Texas Chain Saw Massacre (1974), the film has received critical reevaluation years after release, with particular praise towards the narrative and performances of Peabody and Hess. It has since achieved a cult following and received a nomination for AFI's 100 Years...100 Thrills in 2001. The film was remade in 2009.

== Plot ==
Mari Collingwood plans to attend a concert with her friend Phyllis Stone for her 17th birthday. Mari's parents, Estelle and John, express concern about her friendship with Phyllis, but they let her go and give her a peace symbol necklace. Phyllis and Mari head into the city, and on the way, they hear a news report of a recent prison escape involving criminals Krug Stillo, a sadistic rapist and serial killer; his heroin-addicted son, Junior; Sadie, a promiscuous psychopath and sadist; and Fred "Weasel" Podowski, a child molester, peeping Tom, and murderer. Before the concert, Mari and Phyllis encounter Junior while trying to buy marijuana. He leads them to an apartment where the criminals trap them. Phyllis tries to escape and reason with them, but she fails and is gang-raped. Meanwhile, Mari's unsuspecting parents prepare a surprise party for her.

The following day, Mari and Phyllis are bound, gagged, and put in the trunk of Krug's car and transported to the woods. Mari recognizes that the road is near her home. Phyllis is forced to urinate in her jeans, and Mari and Phyllis are forced to perform sexual acts on each other. Phyllis distracts the kidnappers to allow Mari to escape, but is chased by Sadie and Weasel, while Junior stays behind to guard Mari. Mari tries to gain Junior's trust by giving him her necklace and calling him "Willow." Phyllis stumbles across a cemetery where she is cornered and stabbed by Weasel. She crawls to a nearby tree and is stabbed to death. Mari convinces Junior to let her go, but Krug halts her escape. Krug carves his name into her chest, then rapes her. Mari vomits, quietly says a prayer, and walks into a nearby lake, where Krug fatally shoots her.

After they change out of their bloody clothes, the gang goes to the Collingwoods' home, masquerading as traveling salesmen. Mari's parents let them stay overnight. The gang finds photos of Mari and realizes it is her home. Later, when Junior is amid heroin withdrawal, Estelle enters the bathroom to check on him and sees Mari's peace symbol necklace around his neck. She finds blood-soaked clothing in their luggage and overhears them talking about Mari's death and her disposal in a nearby lake.

Estelle and her husband rush into the woods, where they find Mari's body and decide to take revenge. Estelle pretends to seduce Weasel, performs oral sex on him, bites off his penis, and leaves him to bleed to death. John takes his shotgun and shoots at Krug and Sadie. Krug escapes into the living room and overpowers John. Before Krug can kill John, Junior enters with a gun and threatens Krug, attempting to save John's life. Krug manipulates Junior, who is distraught and going through withdrawal from heroin, into killing himself with the gun instead. Using the distraction, John picks up a chainsaw from the basement and approaches Krug. Sadie enters with the switchblade and tells Krug to take the back door to escape, but Krug is hindered by an electrocution booby trap. Sadie, now terrified of both Krug and John, runs outside. After a scuffle between her and Estelle, she falls into the backyard swimming pool, where Estelle slits her throat. The sheriff arrives just as John kills Krug with the chainsaw.

Covered in blood, the cops and parents somberly overlook the chaos.

== Cast ==
- Sandra Peabody as Mari Collingwood (credited as Sandra Cassel)
- Lucy Grantham as Phyllis Stone
- David A. Hess as Krug Stillo
- Fred Lincoln as Fred 'Weasel' Podowski
- Jeramie Rain as Sadie
- Marc Sheffler as Junior Stillo
- Eleanor Shaw (credited as Cynthia Carr) as Estelle Collingwood
- Richard Towers (credited as Gaylord St. James) as Dr. John Collingwood
- Marshall Anker as Sheriff
- Martin Kove as Deputy Harry
- Ada Washington as Ada
- Ray Edwards as postman
- Jonathan Craven (uncredited) as boy with balloon
- Anthony J. Forcelli (uncredited) as ice cream store clerk
- Steve Miner (uncredited) as Hippie taunting deputy

== Production ==
=== Development ===
Sean S. Cunningham made his directorial debut with the 1970 white coater film The Art of Marriage, which grossed $100,000. The film attracted the attention of Steve Minasian's company Hallmark Releasing, which had a distribution partnership with American International Pictures. Cunningham made the 1971 film Together as a "better version" of The Art of Marriage. Wes Craven, who had no money at the time, was put on the job of synchronizing dailies for Together and soon began editing the film with Cunningham, with whom he became good friends. Hallmark bought the film for $10,000, and it was considered a "hit", prompting the company to persuade Cunningham and Craven to make another film with a bigger budget; the company then gave them $90,000 to shoot a horror film.

Cunningham served as producer, and Craven as writer and director, on the project. Written by Craven in 1971, the original script was intended to be a graphic "hardcore" film. Craven later said that the actors were originally committed to that, although this was contradicted by Fred Lincoln. Jeramie Rain and Sandra Peabody both objected to the original script at their auditions and were assured it would be changed.

The decision was made to edit the script to be less harsh. The next draft, titled Night of Vengeance, has never been published; only a brief glimpse is visible in the 2003 making-of featurette Celluloid Crime of the Century. Copies are available for viewing at the University of Pittsburgh's Horror Scripts and Ephemera Collection. The plot was inspired by the Swedish ballad "Töres döttrar i Wänge", itself the basis of Ingmar Bergman's 1960 film The Virgin Spring, which Craven admired. Craven envisioned a film in which the violence would be shown in detail onscreen, as he felt that many popular films of the era, such as Westerns, glamorized violence and the "vigilante hero", and gave the public a misleading representation of death in the wake of the Vietnam War.

=== Casting ===
The majority of the cast of The Last House on the Left were inexperienced or first-time actors, with the exception of Eleanor Shaw and Sandra Peabody, who were soap opera regulars and had prior film roles. Cunningham and Craven held casting calls for the film at Cunningham's office in Midtown Manhattan in late 1971. Peabody, who was returning to New York after a cross-country road trip, signed on to the film after responding to a casting notice in the trade publication Backstage. Cunningham and Craven originally wanted her to read for the role of Phyllis; however, after meeting her, they decided to cast her as the lead, Mari. Shaw was a prominent soap opera actress, and Towers worked as a talent agent in addition to acting. Although she did not recall the specific circumstances of how she became involved with the project, Lucy Grantham was ultimately cast in the role of Mari's best friend Phyllis. The role of the lead villain, Krug Stillo, was given to David Hess, also a musician and songwriter. Jeramie Rain, then twenty-one years old, was playing Susan Atkins in an Off-Broadway production based on the Manson family murders. Although the original script called for an actress in her 40s, Rain was cast as Sadie. Fred Lincoln, who had appeared in pornographic films, was cast as Krug's criminal partner, while Mark Sheffler was given the role of Krug's heroin-addicted son. Sheffler was a struggling 21-year-old actor and a client of Towers prior to filming, and he informed Sheffler of the auditions. According to Lincoln, he and Peabody were acquaintances and had the same agent at the time.

=== Filming ===
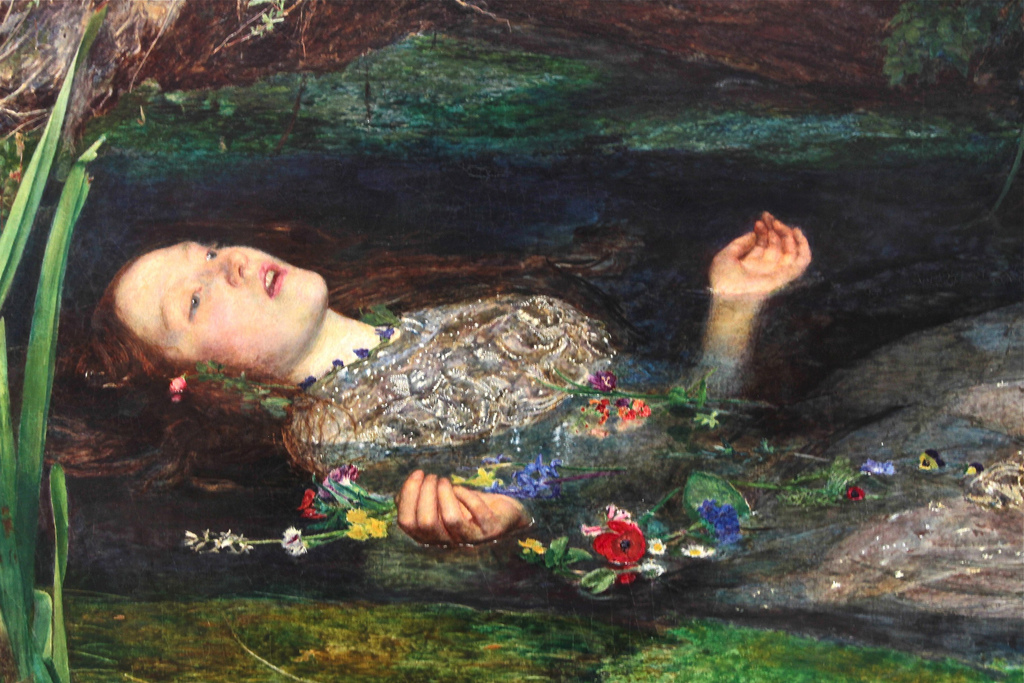

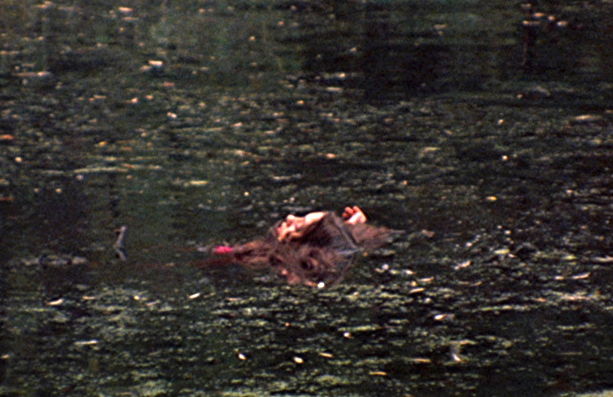
John Everett Millais's painting Ophelia (top) inspired Mari's death scene in the lake (bottom)

The film was shot on location for seven days in New York City, as well as Long Island, followed by shoots in rural locations outside of Westport, Connecticut. While filming in Connecticut, the cast and crew spent much time at producer Cunningham's family's home. According to Craven, the lake sequence was shot in the town reservoir of Weston, Connecticut. Craven sought a "documentary"-style appearance for the film, marked by close-up shots and single-cut takes.

Cunningham later described the film shoot as being "guerrilla-style", with the crew spontaneously filming at locations and being forced to leave due to lack of permits; in retrospect, Lincoln said that "nobody knew what [they] were doing". Much of the special effects in the film were achieved practically, some at Lincoln's suggestion. For example, for the sequence in which Phyllis is disemboweled, Lincoln helped craft fake intestines with condoms filled with fake blood and sand. For the murder sequence of Sadie in the swimming pool, Rain had a pouch full of fake blood attached underneath her shirt, as well as blood capsules in her mouth, which she manually punctured. Grantham recalled that during the scene in which Hess's character tells her to "piss her pants", she in fact urinated in her jeans. Steve Miner, who would later become a director himself, served as a production assistant on the film.

Hess recalled that much of the cast bonded closely during filming, since they were mostly inexperienced actors. In the 2003 documentary Celluloid Crime of the Century, Lincoln, Rain, and Sheffler recalled similar memories which recounted the making of the film. However, both Hess and director Craven recalled that the on-set relationship between Hess and Peabody was turbulent. Craven recalled that Peabody "often wasn't acting" her fear during filming. Sheffler admitted that during a one-on-one sequence with Peabody, he had threatened to push her over a cliff if she failed to hit her marks.

In a commentary track for the 2003 Anchor Bay Entertainment DVD release in the United Kingdom, Hess claimed to have sexually threatened Peabody during the filming of her character's rape scene. In a 2008 Vanity Fair article, Hess also admitted threatening Peabody, telling writer Jason Zinoman: "I was very mean to the girls, so when it came to the rape scene, [Peabody] didn't have to act. I told her, 'I'm really going to fuck you if you don't behave yourself. They'll just let the camera run. I'm going to devastate you.' I don't think she was too happy about that."

Speaking for a making-of book in 2000, Hess revealed that he "may have frightened her a few times" by being "pretty physical" with Peabody during the filming of the rape scene, and that she "couldn't back off" when the camera was running. In the same book, assistant director Yvonne Hannemann described the scene as "really quite upsetting", with Peabody having to be consoled because it had become "very rough". Craven noted that Peabody had told him afterward, "My God... I had the feeling they really hated me", but her only direct contribution about the rape scene in her own interview was "No comment."

Peabody stated that she was genuinely upset during filming as she felt unprepared: "I was upset because I'm an emotional person, and I reacted to what was going on as if it were real. I had a really hard time with some of the scenes, because I had come out of American Playhouse, (Note: American Playhouse did not premiere until 1982. While Peabody did study at the Neighborhood Playhouse the relevant passage does not name that institution.) where it was all about preparation, and everything had to be real. I ended up doing a horrible job in the film. I was very upset, and I felt like I should have channeled that, but I couldn't... I was a young actress, and I was still learning to balance any emotions I had from outside of the film into my scene work."

Peabody recalled, "One of the characters was a method actor, so he was trying to live his part... he'd come after us with a knife at night, trying to freak us out. This was the guy with the dark curly hair [David Hess] (Note: Bracketed name is in the original.) - he tried to play his role on and off the set. It was like, 'Lock your doors and windows at night, you don't want him to come get you!' I was scared; I thought this guy had been a killer at some point in his past!" Peabody stated that although she was unsure how many of the scenes would turn out, she trusted Craven and Cunningham's vision for the film.

=== Music ===
The film's soundtrack was written by Stephen Chapin and David Hess (who also played the main antagonist, Krug); Chapin wrote all the incidental music, arrangements, and orchestration, as well as all the contracting and producing musicians. The music was deliberately written to break with established, conventional horror film scores at that point, employing a mix of 1960s folk rock and bluegrass. It also ran counter to the horror film convention of punctuating moments of fright with shock effects; during some of the film's most violent scenes, music that is completely at odds with the visual content plays.

In 2013, the soundtrack was re-released on vinyl, compact disc, cassette, and digital download through One Way Static Records. It was also reissued on a limited hand-numbered picture disc for Record Store Day 2014.

== Release ==
The film underwent multiple title changes, with its investors initially titling it Sex Crime of the Century. However, after test screenings were completed, it was decided to change the title to Krug and Company, but even this title was found to have little draw during test screenings. A marketing specialist who was an acquaintance of Cunningham's proposed the title The Last House on the Left, which Craven initially thought was "terrible". The film was released under this title on August 30, 1972. Like many films of the era, it expanded to cinemas and drive-in theaters over the next several months, opening in various U.S. cities between September and November 1972. It was frequently shown as part of a double or triple feature with other Hallmark/AIP releases, most notably Mario Bava's Twitch of the Death Nerve, another film that would have a considerable impact on the horror genre due to serving as a primary influence on Cunningham's later Friday the 13th franchise.

Due to its graphic content, the film sparked protests calling for its removal from local theaters throughout the fall of 1972. The Paris Cinema, a movie theater in Pittsfield, Massachusetts, issued an open letter to these criticisms in September 1972, in which it was noted:

After carefully considering all the circumstances, management has decided to continue to show the movie. This difficult decision was predicated on the following considerations: The film relates to a problem that practically every teen-age girl and parent can identify with, yet does not pander to the subject matter. The story does not glorify violence, nor does it glorify the degenerates who perpetrate the violence ... we feel the movie is morally redeeming and does deliver an important social message.

Promotional material capitalized on the film's graphic content and divisive reception, featuring taglines such as "To avoid fainting, keep repeating 'It's only a movie' ..." Under the Last House title, the film proved to be a hit, although anecdotes as to where the advertising campaign originated vary somewhat. Cunningham claims that the marketing specialist who devised the Last House title was watching a cut of the film with his wife, who continually covered her eyes, prompting him to tell her that it was "only a movie". Other origins have been suggested, however, as it had been used twice before: first for H. G. Lewis's 1964 splatter film Color Me Blood Red, and then for William Castle's Strait-Jacket the following year. The tagline was so successful that it was re-purposed by many of Hallmark's other releases, such as Don't Look in the Basement and Don't Open the Window, and other exploitation films, sometimes with a unique spin. A variation was used in the UK for the 1974 double-bill of Night of the Bloody Apes and Night of Bloody Horror. The film's title was also imitated, as in the cases of Last House on Dead End Street, and The House on the Edge of the Park, another film starring David Hess; other films, such as the aforementioned Twitch of the Death Nerve, were later marketed as unofficial sequels with such titles as Last House Part II.

Newspaper advertisements featured lengthy statements from the film's producers defending it against claims that it sensationalized violence, one of which noted: "You will hate the people who perpetrate these outrages—and you should! But if a movie—and it is only a movie—can arouse you to such extreme emotion then the film director has succeeded ... The movie makes a plea for an end to all the senseless violence and inhuman cruelty that has become so much a part of the times in which we live." Promotional artwork accompanying such statements included a warning that the film was "not recommended for persons under 30". The film continued to be screened throughout the United States into 1973. (Note: Contemporaneous newspaper advertisements throughout 1973 list showtimes for the film at movie houses and drive-ins in Oregon, California, Montana, and others.)

== Censorship ==
=== United States ===
Though the film received an R-rating from the MPAA after numerous cuts, director Craven claimed that, on several occasions, horrified audience members would demand that theater projectionists destroy the footage, sometimes stealing the film themselves. John Saco, a British film archivist, recalled discussing the film with American theater owners: "Projectionists were so offended, they would just cut up the film as they were watching it. I'd ask people, 'How cut is your version?' They'd say, 'It's not as cut as some of the others I've seen' – that's hardly what you want to hear!"

=== United Kingdom ===
Last House on the Left was refused a certificate for cinema release by the BBFC in 1974, due to scenes of explicit and sadistic sexual violence and humiliation. During the early 1980s home video boom, the film was released uncut (save for an incidental, gore-free scene with the comic relief cops and the end credits roll), as video did not fall under the BBFC's remit at the time. This changed in 1982 when the "video nasty" scare started, leading to the Video Recordings Act 1984. The movie was placed on the DPP's" list of "video nasties" and was banned.

The film remained banned throughout the 1980s and into the 1990s. However, it had developed an underground cult reputation in the UK, and critics such as Mark Kermode began to laud the film as an important work. In 2000, the film was presented to the BBFC for theatrical certification, but it was refused again. The independent film label Blue Underground toured an uncut print around Britain without a BBFC certificate; Southampton City Council granted it its own "18" certificate. The film was granted a license for a one-off showing in Leicester in June 2000, after which the BBFC again declared that it would not receive any form of certification.

In June 2002, the BBFC prevailed against an appeal made to the Video Appeals Committee by video distributor Blue Underground Limited. The BBFC had required 16 seconds of cuts to scenes of sexual violence before it would grant the video an "18" certificate. Blue Underground Limited refused to make the cuts, and the BBFC therefore rejected the video. The distributor then appealed to the Video Appeals Committee, who upheld the BBFC's decision. During the appeal, film critic Kermode was called in as a horror expert to make a case for the film's historical importance. However, after his report, the committee not only upheld the cuts, but demanded additional ones. The film was eventually given an "18" certificate, on July 17, 2002, with 31 seconds of cuts, and was released in the UK on DVD in May 2003. The cut scenes were viewable as a slideshow extra on the disc, and there was a link to a website where they could be viewed. The BBFC finally classified the uncut film at 18 for video release on March 17, 2008.

=== Australia ===
Contrary to popular belief, the film was never banned in Australia on its initial release; rather, it was never picked up for distribution in the country due to the censorship issues that it would have created at the time. The film was submitted to the censorship board in 1987 for VHS release by Video Excellence under the alternative title 'Krug and Company', but it was rejected due to its violent and sexual content. In October 1991, The Last House on the Left was part of a package of 15 tapes seized by the ACS. The package of tapes was forwarded to the ACB, which declared them "prohibited pursuant to Regulation 4A(1A)(a)(iii) of the Customs (Prohibited Imports) Regulations". The film was eventually classified "R" by the OFLC for its DVD premiere on November 15, 2004. It had a theatrical screening that same month at the ACMI in Melbourne.

=== New Zealand ===
The film was banned by New Zealand's Video Recordings Authority in 1988. The ban was lifted in 2004 when the DVD was passed with an R18 rating.

=== Rare or lost scenes ===
Many different versions of the film exist on various DVD and VHS releases struck from different cuts of the film, many of them from different countries. Getting a completely uncut version is difficult, as even some cinema projectionists cut footage from prints of the movie before screening it in the 1970s; many copies were cut or "hacked to pieces," and as a result, some scenes have become rarities.

Some incomplete scenes are:

- "Lesbian rape scene" – One scene long thought lost, except as a photographic still, is the two female victims forced to commit sexual acts on each other in the woods. This forced lesbian rape scene was included as an outtake with no sound on the Metrodome Three-Disc DVD Ultimate Edition and on the 2011 Blu-ray release.
- "Mari in her room" – At the beginning of the movie, photographic stills show Mari in her room reading birthday cards while she is nude; this scene no longer exists.
- "Mari raped by Sadie" – Footage of Sadie committing sexual acts against Mari in the woods is often removed, even from some DVDs that have been labeled as "uncut".

In the Krug and Company cut, Mari is still alive when her parents find her. She tells her parents what happened to her and Phyllis before dying in front of them.

== Home media ==
The Last House on the Left has been released multiple times on home media in the USA; MGM Home Entertainment released a DVD version on August 27, 2002, which featured outtakes, a making-of documentary, and "Forbidden Footage", a featurette exploring the film's most violent, shocking sequences. On February 1, 2011, a Blu-ray was released by MGM through 20th Century Fox Home Entertainment, which featured multiple featurettes and making-of documentaries, two audio commentary tracks, never-before-seen footage, and cast and crew interviews.

A limited edition Blu-ray box set was released in the USA and UK on July 3, 2018, from Arrow Video, which features three different cuts of the film each restored in 2K from the original film elements, a double-sided poster, lobby card reproductions, a book featuring writings on the film, a CD soundtrack, various archival bonus materials, and new interviews with cast, crew, and associates of Craven.

== Critical response ==
=== Contemporary ===
Critical response to The Last House on the Left upon its original release was largely centered on its depictions of violence. (Note: Numerous critical reviews published throughout the fall of 1972 discounted the film for its graphic content, including ones published in The News-Press, the Lubbock Avalanche-Journal, and the Pittsburgh Press.) Gene Siskel of the Chicago Tribune derided the film, writing: "My objection to The Last House on the Left is not an objection to the graphic representations of violence per se, but to the fact that the movie celebrates violent acts, particularly adult male abuse of young women ... I felt a professional obligation to stick around to see if there was any socially redeeming value in the remainder of the movie and found none." Howard Thompson of The New York Times wrote that he walked out of the theater during a screening: "When I walked out, after 50 minutes (with 35 to go), one girl had just been dismembered with a machete. They had started in on the other with a slow switchblade. The party who wrote this sickening tripe and also directed the inept actors is Wes Craven. It's at the Penthouse Theater, for anyone interested in paying to see repulsive people and human agony."

Edward Blank of the Pittsburgh Press called the film a "cheap-jack movie of no discernible merit [...] riddled with awkward, self-conscious performances." Roger Ebert gave the film three and a half out of four stars, and described it as "about four times as good as you'd expect", citing the "almost unbearable dramatic tension" wrought by Craven's direction, the naturalistic acting, the strong dialogue, and the presentation of the violence, which he felt never glamorized the killers' actions. The Christian Science Monitor News Service referred to the film as a "desperately sordid melodrama" and a "vulgarized" version of The Virgin Spring, and drew comparisons to Sam Peckinpah's 1971 film Straw Dogs. Brian Nelson of The Daily Dispatch deemed it the worst film of the year, writing: "Producer Sean S. Cunningham has somehow managed to make what is possibly 1972's most worthless general release film and, with a sensational and overblown advertising campaign, parlay it into a major moneymaker. In doing so, he may be in line for the Cy Dung Award for the movie most offensive to the intelligence of an audience." The Lubbock Avalanche-Journal's Bill Towery suggested the film should have received an X rating, adding in his review: "Films such as these give the movie ratings system a bad name. But if your cup of tea is assault, murder, maiming, revenge, and violence, the movie is going to be perfect."

=== Modern assessment ===
On review aggregator Rotten Tomatoes, The Last House on the Left holds an approval rating of 67%, based on 51 reviews. Its consensus reads, "Its visceral brutality is more repulsive than engrossing, but The Last House on the Left nevertheless introduces director Wes Craven as a distinctive voice in horror." On Metacritic, the film has a weighted average score of 68 out of 100, based on 8 critics, indicating "generally favorable reviews". Chuck Bowen of Slant Magazine gave the film four and a half stars out of five and stated, "There are more violent films than The Last House on the Left especially in the post-Nightmare on Elm Street era of the serial killer as ironic rock star, though the violence here isn’t palatable or delivered with the ritualized seriousness that flatters our intelligence for consuming a nasty movie. The scenes in which a gang rapes and murders two teenage women are prolonged and disgusting, as the women are never merely elements in an aesthetic, but viscerally terrified, humiliated humans begging for mercy with unmooring rawness."

Author and film critic Leonard Maltin awarded the film 1.5/4 stars. Maltin called the film "cheap", and "[a] repellent but admittedly powerful and (for better or worse) influential horror shocker." The film was nominated for AFI's 100 Years...100 Thrills.

The treatment of Sandra Peabody by her colleagues has occasionally been discussed in modern media. In 2022, Rue Morgue writer Andrea Subissati noted that Peabody "didn't exactly receive prima donna treatment on set." Subissati singled out David Hess and Marc Sheffler for "bullying [Peabody] and even going so far as threatening to actually harm her to get good footage."

== Related works ==
=== Sequel ===
In the 1980s, Vestron Pictures hired Danny Steinmann to write and direct a sequel, though the film fell apart in pre-production due to rights issues. Mario Bava's film Twitch of the Death Nerve was also released under the titles Last House on the Left – Part II, Last House – Part II and New House on the Left.

=== Remake ===
In August 2006, Rogue Pictures finalized a deal to remake The Last House on the Left with original writer and director Wes Craven as a producer. The company intended to preserve the storyline of the original film. Craven described his involvement with the remake: "I'm far enough removed from these films that the remakes are a little like having grandchildren. The story, about the painful side effects of revenge, is an evergreen. The headlines are full of people and nations taking revenge and getting caught up in endless cycles of violence." Craven formed Midnight Pictures, a shingle of Rogue, to remake The Last House on the Left as its first project. Production was slated for early 2007. Screenwriter Adam Alleca was hired to write the script for the remake.

In May 2007, Rogue entered negotiations with director Dennis Iliadis to direct the film. The film was released to theaters in the U.S. and Canada on March 13, 2009.

== See also ==
- List of American films of 1972
- List of films featuring home invasions
- List of films featuring psychopaths and sociopaths
- List of incomplete or partially lost films
- Last Stop on the Night Train, a 1975 Italian horror film with a similar premise
- Last Podcast on the Left
- Chaos, a 2005 unofficial remake of the film.

== Sources ==
- Corman, Tod; Cregan, John, eds. (2003). Celluloid Crime of the Century. The Last House on the Left (DVD documentary featurette). Anchor Bay Entertainment.
- Craig, Rob (February 7, 2019). American International Pictures: A Comprehensive Filmography. McFarland Publishing. ISBN 9781476666310.
- Gallant, Chris (2000). Art of Darkness: The Cinema of Dario Argento. London: FAB Press. ISBN 978-1-903-25407-3.
- Lucas, Tim (2007). Mario Bava: All the Colors of the Dark. Video Watchdog. ISBN 978-0-9633756-1-2.
- Muir, John Kenneth (2002). Horror Films of the 1970s. Jefferson, North Carolina: McFarland. ISBN 978-0-786-49156-8.
- Muir, John Kenneth (2004). Wes Craven: The Art of Horror. Jefferson, North Carolina: McFarland & Company. ISBN 978-0-786-41923-4.
- Sumner, Don (2010). Horror Movie Freak. Krause Publications. ISBN 978-1-440-21564-3.
- Szulkin, David (2000). Wes Craven's The Last House On The Left (Revised ed.). London: FAB Press. ISBN 1-903254-01-9.
