= Don Schain =

American film director

- Born: Donald Rodney Schain; February 26, 1941; New Jersey, U.S.
- Died: December 26, 2015 (aged 74); Salt Lake City, Utah, U.S.
- Education: University of North Carolina at Chapel Hill
- Occupation: Filmmaker
- Years active: 1970–2015
- Notable work: High School Musical
- Spouse(s): Cheri Caffaro (m. 1971; div. 1982) Shauna Miller

Donald Rodney Schain (February 26, 1941 – December 26, 2015) was an American director, writer, and producer of many films and TV movies, notably for the Disney Channel.

Schain joined the movie industry in the early 1970s, directing his then-wife, Cheri Caffaro, in several low-budget exploitation films, including the Ginger trilogy.

In the 1990s, he moved to Utah and went on to produce movies of a more family-oriented nature for the Disney Channel, including High School Musical, Wendy Wu: Homecoming Warrior, and Read It and Weep. He was the first president of the Motion Picture Association of Utah.
