= House (film series) =

Series of American horror films

- Official film series logo
- Based on: An original story by Fred Dekker
- Country: United States
- Language: English
- Budget: $10,000,000 (4 films)
- Box office: > $31,683,528 (3 films)

The House film series is a group of four American horror films released between 1985 and 1992, with the fifth installment in production. The series also touches on genres such as psychological thriller, supernatural, slasher, comedy, and adventure.

The plot of the first film was based on an original story written by Fred Dekker, with subsequent movies being based on his initial concept. The overall plot of the individual movies center around the supernatural events that take place at haunted houses, and detail the actions of the protagonist families that live in them.

Though the original film was initially met with mixed critical reception, it has since been deemed a cult classic in the horror genre. Due to its financial success at the box office, the studio and its producers fast-tracked a standalone sequel. Written and directed by the first installment's screenwriter, the second film was met with overwhelmingly negative critical reaction and mild box office returns. Despite this, the installment has also gained a cult following in the years since. The third film was both a monetary and critical failure, though a few aspects have received some praise by modern retrospective analysis. With financial losses, the fourth and final movie was produced with a microbudget and given a direct-to-home video release in the U.S., due to the increased popularity of video rental stores, and limited theatrical release in other countries. The film was met with financial disappointment and negative reception from its critics as well as its audience. Despite this, the movie was number one in Italian theaters upon its release, while modern film critics acknowledge its return-to-form for the series.

== Films ==
Film	U.S. release date	Director	Screenwriter(s)	Story by	Producer(s)
House	December 6, 1985	Steve Miner	Ethan Wiley	Fred Dekker	Sean S. Cunningham
House II: The Second Story	August 28, 1987	Ethan Wiley	Ethan Wiley	Fred Dekker	Sean S. Cunningham
House III: The Horror Show	April 28, 1989	James Isaac (Note: David Blyth served as the film's original director, before being fired from the production after one week of principal photography.)	Allan Smithee (Note: Allyn Warner was the screenwriter, who was credited under this pseudonym.) and Leslie Bohem	Allan Smithee and Leslie Bohem	Sean S. Cunningham
House IV: The Repossession	January 29, 1992	Lewis Abernathy	Geof Miller & Deirdre Higgins	Geof Miller & Deirdre Higgins and Jim Wynorski & R.J. Robertson	Sean S. Cunningham and Debbie Hayn-Cass
House	TBA	Jeremy Weiss	Jeff Locker	Jeff Locker & Jeremy Weiss	Sean S. Cunningham

=== House (1985) ===
A formerly popular, troubled author named Roger Cobb is tasked with writing another novel by his publisher. These new stresses associated with his contractual obligations, compound the reality that he and his wife have separated after his young son has gone missing. Cobb finds himself the heir of an old house when his elderly aunt who recently committed suicide in the home, leaves the estate to him. Despite the discouragement of others, he decides to spend his time there while he writes his book. Though the financers want him to write another horror story, he opts to base the tale on his time in the Vietnam War instead. Shortly after moving in, he begins to have horrific nightmares and experiences strange phenomena during the daylight hours. A series of attacks from other-worldly entities convinces the author to confide in those around him, though his neighbor begins to question his sanity.

He soon locates a gateway within the home, which leads to another dimension where he locates his son. After returning with Jimmy, he must also face the ghosts of his past including a personification of his comrade named Big Ben, who was killed during their time in Vietnam. Cobb seeks to work through his problems, while overcoming his inner demons, so that he can reunite with his recently reformed family.

=== House II: The Second Story (1987) ===
Jesse McLaughlin, and his girlfriend Kate move into his old family mansion together. Though he inherited the property as a baby when his parents died, he has purposefully avoided the property. The couple allow his best friend Charlie Coriell, and the latter's girlfriend to move in as additional roommates. Together the group begin sorting through the various rooms in the home. They soon discover some memorabilia in the basement, which once belonged to his great-great-grandfather (and namesake). "Gramps", who was a treasure hunter was the keeper of an Aztec crystal skull that he discovered with his partner and friend-turned-enemy "Slim" Reeser. After examining some photographs and paperwork, they resolve to dig up the grave of his ancestor, believing that he had the ancient treasure buried with him.

In the process of doing so, the curse of the item inadvertently awakens the spirit of the older McLaughlin and reanimates his corpse. Upon realizing that Jesse is his descendant, Jesse "Gramps" McLaughlin proves to be an ally to their cause. When they return to the mansion, "Gramps" is disheartened to see that he is merely a zombie and not rejuvenated to his peak physicality. After the old cowboy tells stories from his past, he explains that the stones of the house are made from remnants of an Aztec temple and that the skull acts as a key to enter different portals across different periods of time in each room. He tasks the friends with defending the artifact against the forces of evil, that are drawn to its power. As they fight across the various time periods which open within the mansion, they form alliances with additional individuals: a young pterodactyl, a caterpillar-dog-like hybrid animal which they name "Cater-Puppy", and an adventurer named Bill Towner who comes to their aid under the guise of an electrician.

Despite these small successes, an undead Reeser rises from his death to steal the crystal skull for its mystic abilities, revealing that he was the murderer of Jesse's parents years ago. The miss-mashed team of friends from different spans of time, must once again join against the forces that seek to overtake them, end the plans "Slim" Reeser to defend all of reality, and send him back to his grave once and for all.

=== House III: The Horror Show (1989) ===
Continuing the anthological nature of the franchise, the film was developed as a sequel. Deemed darker and more mature than previous installments, producers decided to market the film without the House name for the U.S. theatrical release. Despite this, the movie was released with the House moniker in foreign markets. After the poor box office reception, which some perceived as partially due to the confusion caused by the title and the general audience not realizing that it was a House film, the installment was re-marketed with its full title and distributed on home entertainment by the associated studios. The premise of the film follows:

Detective Lucas McCarthy who has pursued the serial killer Max "The Cleaver" Jenke for years, finally makes his arrest. Following his prosecution and sentencing to death, McCarthy is amongst those present at the execution. During the process, Jenke promises revenge in his final words, just prior to being electrocuted. After his death, the McCarthy family moves into a new home and try to move on from the horrific events. Despite this, evidence begins to come forth, which calls into question McCarthy's association to the victims of the murderer. As an investigation ensues, strange occurrences take place and terrify the family within their home. They all begin to believe that "The Cleaver" is tormenting them from beyond the grave, as he promised in his final moments. A parapsychologist named Peter Campbell that the family hires, purports that the killer must have made a deal with the devil prior to his execution, allowing his spirit to return and haunt the family. Campbell warns that the only way that they will be able to escape the cursed soul of Jenke, is if they destroy his spirit.

As the inexplicable events increase and become worse, the family seeks to clear McCarthy's good name with the law, all while attempting to save their own lives as the ghost of a mass murderer begins to hunt them.

=== House IV: The Repossession (1992) ===
Roger Cobb, who remarried a woman named Kelly and fathered a child with her named Laurel, mourns the passing of his father. Though his estranged step-brother Burke admonishes him to sell the old Cobb family home, he wishes to keep the home for nostalgic memories from his childhood and with the knowledge that he promised his father that he would keep the land in the ownership of the family.

After an unforeseen auto collision ends with his death, Laurel finds herself a widow that must care for their daughter who is now paralyzed and uses a wheelchair. Now the heir to the Cobb house, Burke begins to pressure her into selling the estate. Despite her initial resistance, inexplicable paranormal events begin to take place within their home. Scaring her into consideration of the sale, she seeks the help of a Native American spiritual guide named Ezra. After conversing with the spirits that reside in the house, the old man reveals to Kelly and Laurel that the strange happenings are the attempts of a warning from the ghosts of Roger and a number of Native Americans. The Natives resided on the land prior to that of the Cobb family, and viewed it as sacred-natured. The spirits are warning them of pending danger.

As it's revealed that Burke is in negotiations to sell the land to a powerful Mafian group that will soil the once revered location, with the disposal of toxic waste on the vicinity, evidence suggests that the estranged family member may be responsible for the car wreck that previously took place. Together as a family, and with the help of these paranormal beings, they must overcome the advances of the wicked group that seek to take the land as their own.

=== Future ===
In January 2023, it was announced that a new film intended to relaunch the House Intellectual property is in development. Jeremy Weiss will serve as director, with a script written by Jeff Locker, from a story pitch co-authored by Locker and Weiss. The plot is said to be a comedy-horror contemporary reimagining of the series that will include monster characters from the original film. The pair pitched their story to Sean S. Cunningham, who approved the story and will be serving as producer. The first teaser poster debuted, a release was slated for 2024, but the year passed without news about the film.

== Main cast and characters ==
List indicators

This section includes characters who will appear or have appeared in the franchise in main roles.

- An empty grey cell indicates the character was not in the film, or that the character's official presence has not yet been confirmed.
- ^{V} indicates a voice-only role.

Character	Films			
Character	House	House II: The Second Story	House III: The Horror Show	House IV: The Repossession
Roger Cobb	William Katt			William Katt
Sandy Sinclair Cobb	Kay Lenz			
Jimmy Cobb	Erik Silver & Mark Silver			
Harold Gorton	George Wendt			
Aunt Elizabeth Hooper	Susan French			
Big "Big Ben"	Richard Moll			
Little Critters	Jerry Maren & Elizabeth Barrington Dino Andrade^{V}			
Jesse McLaughlin		Arye Gross		
Charlie Coriell		Jonathan Stark		
Kate		Lar Park Lincoln		
"Gramps" Jessie McLaughlin		Royal Dano		
Bill Tanner		John Ratzenberger		
"Slim" Reeser		Dean Cleverdon Frank Welker^{V}		
Detective Lucas McCarthy			Lance Henriksen	
Max Jenke The Meat Cleaver			Brion James	
Donna McCarthy			Rita Taggart	
Bonnie McCarthy			Dedee Pfeiffer	
Scotty McCarthy			Aron Eisenberg	
Peter Campbell			Thom Bray	
Kelly Cobb				Terri Treas
Laurel Cobb				Melissa Clayton
Burke Cobb				Scott Burkholder
Mr. Cobb, Roger's Father				Dabbs Greer
Ezra				Ned Romero

== Additional crew and production details ==
Title	Crew/Detail					
Title	Composer	Cinematographer	Editor	Production companies	Distributing companies	Running time
House (1985)	Harry Manfredini	Mac Ahlberg	Michael N. Knue	New World Pictures, Seans S. Cunningham Films, Manley Productions	New World Pictures	1 hr 33 mins
House II: The Second Story	Harry Manfredini	Mac Ahlberg	Martin Nicholson	New World Pictures, Seans S. Cunningham Films, Manley Productions	New World Pictures	1 hr 28 mins
House III: The Horror Show	Harry Manfredini	Mac Ahlberg	Edward Anton	Sean S. Cunningham Films	United Artists	1 hr 35 mins
House IV: The Repossession	Harry Manfredini	James Mathers	Seth Gaven	New Line Cinema, Sean S. Cunningham Films	New Line Home Video, RCA/Columbia Pictures Home Video	1 hr 34 mins
House (2024)	TBA	TBA	TBA	Sean S. Cunningham Productions	TBA	TBA

== Reception ==
=== Box office and financial performance ===
Film	Box office gross			Box office ranking		Home-video sales	Worldwide total gross income	Budget	Worldwide total net income/loss	Ref.
Film	North America	Other territories	Worldwide	All time worldwide	North America	Home-video sales	Worldwide total gross income	Budget	Worldwide total net income/loss	Ref.
House	$19,444,631	$2,700,000	$22,144,631	#3,789	#7,477	Information not publicly available	> $22,144,631	$3,000,000	≥ $19,144,631	
House II: The Second Story	$7,800,000	—N/a	$7,800,000	#5,647	#8,098	Information not publicly available	> $7,800,000	$3,000,000	≥ $4,800,000	
House III: The Horror Show	$1,738,897	—N/a	$1,738,897	#7,885	#12,720	Information not publicly available	> $1,738,897	$3,000,000	~ -$1,261,103	
House IV: The Repossession	—N/a	Information not publicly available	Information not publicly available	Information not publicly available	—N/a	Information not publicly available	> $0	$1,000,000	> $0	
Totals	$28,983,528	> $2,700,000	> $31,683,528	x̄ #4,330	x̄ #7,074	> $0	> $31,683,528	$10,000,000	> $11,683,528	

=== Critical and public response ===
Title	Rotten Tomatoes	Metacritic	CinemaScore
House	57% (14 reviews)	44/100 (5 reviews)	C
House II: The Second Story	7% (14 reviews)	31/100 (7 reviews)	C+
House III: The Horror Show	0% (4 reviews)	—N/a	—N/a
House IV: The Repossession	(1 review)	—N/a	—N/a
