= Through the Looking Glass (film) =

- Theatrical release poster
- Directed by: Jonas Middleton
- Screenplay by: Ron Wertheim; David Maryla; Jonas Middleton
- Story by: David Maryla; Jonas Middleton
- Produced by: Jonas Middleton
- Starring: Catharine Burgess; Jamie Gillis; Laura Nicholson
- Cinematography: João Fernandes (as Harry Flecks)
- Edited by: James Macreading; Maurizio Zaubman
- Music by: Harry Manfredini; Arlon Ober
- Production company: Mastermind Productions
- Distributed by: Mature Pictures Corp.; VCX; Video-X-Pix
- Release date: October 17, 1977 (Sweden)
- Running time: 91 minutes
- Country: United States
- Language: English

Through The Looking Glass (released in France as Femme ou démon) is a 1976 American adult horror film directed by Jonas Middleton and starring Catharine Burgess, Jamie Gillis and Laura Nicholson. "Catharine Burgess" was a pseudonym for Catherine Erhardt. The film, which has avant-garde elements, concerns a bored socialite who finds herself drawn to a mirror that sexually arouses her. The film has themes of incest and the traumatic effects it has on those who have experienced it. It also contains scenes of violence and sexual violence, as well as presenting the sexual content in an artistic as opposed to erotic manner.

== Plot ==
Catherine is a sexually unfulfilled socialite who longs for the memory of her father. She spends much of her time in the attic, masturbating in front of a gothic mirror that reminds her of her childhood and teenage years with her father. During one of her daily visits she encounters the ghost of her father in the mirror. The ghost performs manual sex on her and draws her into the mirror to witness several sexually charged scenarios. These pique her interest and eventually culminate in a scene where Catherine witnesses her teenage self semi-reluctantly, then enthusiastically, take part in an incestuous encounter with her father. After her father is finished with the encounter, he remarks to Catherine that this was what she wanted. Before returning to reality, Catherine realizes that this is not her father but a demonic figure. She tries to deny his invitation to come into the mirror's realm as a permanent resident but the demon tells her that he knows that she will return as she always has in the past, as she is bored with the world and her husband. He tells her to return to the mirror at 1 am, but only after fulfilling a few conditions. She must not only throw all of her jewelry away, but she must also allow her daughter Jennifer to have unconditional access to the room so that the demon can watch her just as he watched Catherine grow.

This upsets Catherine, as she had previously forbid her daughter from entering the room and did not want to allow the demon access to Jennifer. She tries to get out of the late night encounter by trying to leave the house and persuade her husband to take her somewhere, but is unsuccessful. Later that night Catherine returns to the room and in a dream-like state begins to masturbate. The demon exits the mirror and while initially languid upon his approach, Catherine begins to struggle against his advances. He then violently rapes Catherine, who screams, which awakens the rest of the house. She eventually passes out, awakening in an horrific world where people degrade themselves and each another. Catherine is horror struck to realize that rather than the lavish world that had been promised to her, the demon has tricked her and that she is there because she chose to focus on sexual illusions and fulfilling her deepest desires rather than try to interact more with the world around her and improve herself as a person. She discovers her father in the sexual hell, which further terrifies her. Dodging the many people trying to sexually assault her, Catherine tries to escape but is unable to and succumbs to the madness of the hell. Her daughter sits in front of the mirror, becoming just as enraptured with it as her mother had been earlier.

== Cast ==
- Catherine Erhardt as Catherine (Billed as Catharine Burgess)
- Jamie Gillis as Demon / Father
- Laura Nicholson as Jennifer
- Kristen Steen as Young Catherine (as Marie Taylor)
- Douglas Wood as Richard
- Kim Pope as Ann
- Eve Every as Lilly
- UltraMax as Mrs. Manchester
- Roger Caine as Abel (as Mike Jefferson)
- Nancy Dare as Karen (as Suzan Swanson)
- Terri Hall as Lisa
- Jeffrey Hurst as Mr. Manchester
- Rocky Millstone as Eugene (as Jacob Pomerantz)
- Grover Griffith as Fat Man
- Victoria Karl as Beauty Queen

== Release history ==
While filming Through the Looking Glass, Middleton shot three different versions of the film (two soft core, one hard core) in order to market the film to different audiences. The film played in American and European art houses, and in its original run at New York's infamous World Theater, the theater screened a Warner Bros. cartoon before the feature film. It achieved some small notoriety in the New York papers at the time because it featured an underage soap opera actress in a small, non-sex role, as the original poster named Nicholson as a "14 year old starlet". The line was removed from all future posters.

Through the Looking Glass has since been shown at some film festivals, such as the 2013 In The Flesh film festival.

In a rare review in a mainstream publication, John Grant in The Encyclopedia of Fantasy comments that the movie "deploys some sophisticated fantasy" and "announce[s] that pornographic fantasy movies need not be entirely awful, although almost all of its successors have been".

== Book tie-in ==
A novelization of the film's script, written by Eileen Lottman under pseudonym of Molly Flute, was published through Dell Publishing. Largely similar to the film, the novel elaborates on the movie's story line, elaborating on the mirror's history within Catherine's family and heavily implying that her mother was spirited away through the mirror like Catherine was. The book also takes away the ambiguity of whether or not Catherine was molested, outright stating that the sexual scene between Catherine and her father occurred. The book also affirms at the end that Catherine's daughter Jennifer has been caught up in the mirror's spell and will eventually end up in the same sexual hell and in many of the same situations that Catherine herself was in, perpetuating the cycle that has been in place throughout Catherine's family.

== See also ==
- Golden Age of Porn
