= Jason Goes to Hell: The Final Friday =

1993 film by Adam Marcus

- Theatrical release poster
- Directed by: Adam Marcus
- Screenplay by: Dean Lorey; Jay Huguely
- Story by: Jay Huguely; Adam Marcus
- Based on: Characters by Victor Miller
- Produced by: Sean S. Cunningham
- Starring: John D. LeMay; Kari Keegan; Erin Gray; Allison Smith; Steven Culp; Steven Williams
- Cinematography: Bill Dill
- Edited by: David Handman
- Music by: Harry Manfredini
- Production company: Sean S. Cunningham Films
- Distributed by: New Line Cinema
- Release date: August 13, 1993
- Running time: 88 minutes
- Country: United States
- Language: English
- Budget: $3 million
- Box office: $15.9 million

Jason Goes to Hell: The Final Friday is a 1993 American supernatural slasher film directed by Adam Marcus from a screenplay by Dean Lorey and Jay Huguely, based on a story by Huguely and Marcus. The ninth installment in the Friday the 13th franchise, as well as the first installment in the franchise to be released by New Line Cinema, it stars John D. LeMay, Kari Keegan, Erin Gray, Allison Smith, Steven Culp, Steven Williams, and Kane Hodder as Jason Voorhees, reprising his role from Friday the 13th Part VII: The New Blood (1988) and Friday the 13th Part VIII: Jason Takes Manhattan (1989). The film follows the ghost of Jason possessing people in order to continue his killings after his death. To resurrect himself, Jason must possess a member of his bloodline, but he can also be permanently killed by one of his family members using a magic dagger.

The film was conceived by co-writer and director Marcus under Sean S. Cunningham, producer and director of the first film. After the low box-office returns of Jason Takes Manhattan, Paramount Pictures sold the character rights of Jason Voorhees to New Line Cinema.

Jason Goes to Hell was theatrically released on August 13, 1993, and grossed $15.9 million at the box office on a budget of $3 million, becoming the second-lowest performing film in the series, after Jason Takes Manhattan. The film was lambasted by critics and fans for its supernatural elements and the limited physical presence of Jason Voorhees.

The next installment in the series, Jason X, was released in 2001, and a crossover sequel with the A Nightmare on Elm Street franchise, Freddy vs. Jason, was released in 2003.

== Plot ==
At Crystal Lake, Jason Voorhees stalks Elizabeth Marcus, an undercover FBI agent, in a house, where she lures Jason outside into a trap wherein FBI SWAT agents attack and kill him with a grenade launcher. Jason's remains are sent to a morgue, where his beating heart is eaten by the coroner, allowing Jason's soul to possess him. Jason, in the coroner's body, escapes the morgue, killing another coroner and two FBI guards.

Jason finds three teenagers at Crystal Lake and kills them. Jason next appears at the diner where a waitress, Diana Kimble, works. He watches as a local deputy comforts her about her relationship with the Sheriff then watches her go back inside the diner. The deputy then meets a woman who pulls up. As they are leaving, Jason kills her and takes the deputy back to Voorhees's old home and transfers into the deputy's body. Bounty hunter Creighton Duke discovers that only members of Jason's bloodline can permanently kill him, and he will return if he possesses a family member. The only living relatives of Jason are his half-sister Diana, her daughter Jessica, and Stephanie, the young daughter of Jessica and Steven Freeman.

In the body of the deputy, Jason attempts to possess Diana but Steven stops him. Diana is killed, and Jason escapes. Steven is arrested for the murder of Diana. He meets Duke in prison, who gives Steven information about Jason and his connection with Jessica and breaks a couple of Steven's fingers. Determined to get to Jessica before Jason, Steven escapes from prison. He goes to the Voorhees house to find evidence to convince Jessica of her link to Jason. Jessica's boyfriend, TV reporter Robert Campbell, receives a phone call in the house that Steven overhears, which reveals that Campbell is attempting to boost ratings by revealing Jason's return from death. Jason transfers his heart to him through their mouths. Now in Campbell's body, Jason leaves and attempts to possess Jessica. Steven stops him and tries to explain everything to Jessica, but she does not believe him and goes to the police station without him.

Jason arrives and kills the officers while searching for Jessica, who he nearly possesses before Steven stops him again. Duke escapes from his cell in the resulting chaos. Now believing Steven, Jessica goes with him to the diner to get Stephanie. Jason arrives and is attacked by the owners and a waitress. Jessica and Steven discover that Duke has Stephanie, and he demands that Jessica meet him at the Voorhees house alone.

Jessica abandons Steven, meets Duke, and is given a magic dagger which she can use to permanently kill Jason. An officer enters the diner and is possessed by Jason. Duke falls through the floor of the Voorhees house as Sheriff Landis and Officer Randy arrive to confront Jessica. Landis is accidentally killed with the dagger that Jessica drops. Jason, possessing Randy, attempts to be reborn through Stephanie, but Steven arrives and kills him with a machete. Jason's heart has become a demon which enters Diana, allowing Jason to be reborn in his original body as Steven and Jessica rescue Duke.

While Steven and Jessica attempt to find the dagger, Duke distracts Jason and is killed. Jason and Steven fight while Jessica retrieves the dagger and stabs Jason. As the souls Jason killed are released, demons drag Jason into hell. While Jessica and Steven walk off with Stephanie into the sunrise, a glove with bladed fingers (Note: Belonging to Freddy Krueger.) bursts from the ground, grabs Jason's mask, and drags it underground.

== Cast ==
- Kane Hodder as Jason Voorhees
- John D. LeMay as Steven Freeman
- Kari Keegan as Jessica Kimble
- Steven Williams as Creighton Duke
- Allison Smith as Vicki
- Erin Gray as Diana Kimble
- Steven Culp as Robert Campbell
- Rusty Schwimmer as Joey B.
- Leslie Jordan as Shelby B.
- Billy Green Bush as Sheriff Ed Landis
- Andrew Bloch as Josh
- Kipp Marcus as Randy Parker
- Richard Gant as Coroner
- Adam Cranner as Ward B.
- Julie Michaels as Elizabeth Marcus F.B.I.
- James Gleason as Agent Abernathy
- Dean Lorey as Assistant Coroner
- Adam Marcus as Officer Bish
- Mark Thompson as Officer Mark
- Brian Phelps as Officer Brian
- Blake Conway as Officer Andell
- Madelon Curtis as Officer Ryan
- Michelle Clunie as Deborah
- Michael B. Silver as Luke
- Kathryn Atwood as Alexis

== Production ==
=== Development ===
Producer Sean S. Cunningham originally conceived an action-horror film in which Jason Voorhees would battle Freddy Krueger of the A Nightmare on Elm Street series. Paramount Pictures, who had released the previous eight Friday the 13th films, negotiated with New Line Cinema over the rights to the series, and ultimately granted New Line Cinema rights to the Jason Voorhees character, but forgot to give them the Friday the 13th title. New Line Cinema placed Cunningham's idea for a Freddy-versus-Jason film on hold, prompting him to generate a different script to precede that plot line. Cunningham's original idea would later manifest as Freddy vs. Jason in 2003. Adam Marcus was brought in by Cunningham to direct the film under the notion that he must remove Jason's hockey mask. Cunningham has denied ever telling Marcus to "find a way to get rid of that fucking mask", however, Marcus rebukes Cunningham's claim and insists that he did not have that level of creative control. Cunningham had also demanded that the events of Friday the 13th Part VIII: Jason Takes Manhattan be ignored. The filmmaker's initial pitch saw Elias Voorhees, Jason's father, digging up his body at the beginning of the film, eating his heart, taking on his supernatural powers and embarking on a similar killing spree. Jay Huguely was hired to flesh out Marcus' ideas into a script. According to Marcus, he had originally intended for the character of Steven Freeman to be Tommy Jarvis from part 4–6, but New Line Cinema only owned the rights to Jason and not Tommy and so could not legally use that character at the time. Marcus also explains that New Line Cinema did not own the Friday the 13th title, explaining why the film titles after Jason Takes Manhattan did not include the franchise name up until the 2009 reboot.

Huguely's draft was reportedly "[...] a hodgepodge of a script" and "unintelligible". Cunningham hired Dean Lorey to scrap Huguely's work and write a completely new script within four days, removing Elias Voorhees from the story as Lorey felt that Jason must be the central character. Lorey's initial idea for the film saw Jason caught in between a gang war in Los Angeles, but an impending production start immediately shot down the writer's pitch. Michael De Luca of New Line disliked Lorey's rewrite but greenlit the film regardless. Lorey moved onto another project, prompting the studio to turn to Leslie Bohem, who provided a polish to the script over a weekend. Lewis Abernathy of House IV: The Repossession was enlisted for further rewrites for the opening sequence.

The film marked Adam Marcus' debut film; having graduated from film school, Marcus was originally attached to direct My Boyfriend's Back for Touchstone Pictures, but the studio's parent company, Walt Disney Studios, did not want to hire a first-time director, and Marcus was dropped from the project. Marcus, who was a lifelong fan of the Friday the 13th series, developed a story in which Voorhees is destroyed at the beginning of the narrative, only to manifest in the bodies of other people and continue his rampage. Marcus would later acknowledge the concept's similarity to that of The Hidden, though he stated he had not seen the film at that time, and that the similarity was coincidental. Marcus decided that he wanted to create the most deliberately stereotypical and cliché-ridden opening of the film as possible to toy with the audience's expectations, only for the story to take an unprecedented turn with Jason's unexpected "death" by the hands of the SWAT team. The special effects were provided by Al Magliochetti and effects studio KNB, the former having signed on to the film after friends of his from KNB notified him of its development. The colors of the visual effects were chosen by Marcus.

=== Casting ===
Tony Todd auditioned for the role of Creighton Duke, which went to Steven Williams. Laurie Holden was Adam Marcus' and Dean Lorey's choice for the role of Jessica Kimble, but Sean Cunningham overruled them and pushed for Kari Keegan instead.

=== Filming ===
Production began on July 20, 1992, in Los Angeles, California. Cunningham had asked for the film to be shot at twenty two frames per second as opposed to twenty four. Marcus claims he clashed with Cunningham following a dispute over creative decision near the end of filming. A shower scene involving actress Kari Keegan resulted in Marcus being removed from set due to a dispute between the two, as the actress protested from doing nudity for the film. Cunningham would step in as director in place of Marcus for the final few days of the film. Approximately half of the film was reshot as Cunningham was unsatisfied with the initial cut of the film. Filming concluded on September 4, 1992.

=== Retrospective insight ===
In November 2017, Adam Marcus stated that an overlooked plot-point of the movie is that Jason Voorhees is actually connected to the Evil Dead franchise. The filmmaker stated:

Pamela Voorhees makes a deal with the devil by reading from the Necronomicon to bring back her son. This is why Jason isn't Jason. He's Jason plus The Evil Dead, and now I can believe that he can go from a little boy that lives in a lake, to a full grown man in a couple of months, to Zombie Jason, to never being able to kill this guy. That, to me, is way more interesting as a mashup, and [Evil Dead creator Sam] Raimi loved it! It's not like I could tell New Line my plan to include The Evil Dead, because they don't own The Evil Dead. So it had to be an Easter egg, and I did focus on it ... there's a whole scene that includes the book, and I hoped people would get it and could figure out that's what I'm up to. So yes, in my opinion, Jason Voorhees is a Deadite. He's one of The Evil Dead.

In December 2017 on the podcast Cinema Toast Crunchcast, Marcus revealed Creighton Duke's intended backstory, "A teenage Creighton was out on Crystal Lake with his girlfriend. Jason capsized their small boat and pulled the girl down into the lake. Creighton tried to save her but could not. She was never seen again. Creighton vowed revenge and from that moment on he spent his life in the study and pursuit of Jason. He became a bounty hunter just to fund his work in taking down his nemesis."

== Music ==
Jason Goes to Hell: The Final Friday

Soundtrack album by Harry Manfredini
- Released: January 29, 1993 (Edel Screen)
- Recorded: 1993
- Genre: Film score
- Length: 52:52
- Label: Edel Screen

The film's musical score was composed by Harry Manfredini, who had previously composed music for the first seven films in the series. A soundtrack album was released by Edel Screen as a CD in the United States in 1993. In July 2025, Terror Vision released the film's soundtrack on cassette.

== Release ==
New Line Cinema released Jason Goes to Hell: The Final Friday in North America on August 13, 1993.

=== Home media ===
The film was released on VHS by New Line Home Entertainment in the United States and Alliance Video in Canada on January 19, 1994. It was later released on DVD in North America by New Line in 2002, and includes two cuts: the theatrical cut, created to receive an R rating from the MPAA, after originally receiving the NC-17 rating, and the unrated (or director's) cut, which runs three minutes longer than the theatrical version and contains material beyond what is allowed under the R rating. In certain regions of the world, including Australia, the DVD was only released with the R-rated version of the film available to view.

On September 13, 2013, Paramount and Warner Bros. co-released Friday the 13th: The Complete Collection in a Blu-ray box set, featuring each of the twelve films in the franchise; this marked the first Blu-ray release of Jason Goes to Hell. This collection is currently out of print, but the film has been released separately in the higher definition format with its successor, Jason X.

Both the theatrical and unrated versions of the film were added to the Friday the 13th: The Ultimate Collection Blu-ray set that Scream Factory released on October 13, 2020. On May 20, 2025, Arrow Films released a standalone limited edition 4K UHD Blu-ray of the film.

== Reception ==
=== Box office ===
Jason Goes to Hell: The Final Friday earned $7.6 million in the United States during its opening weekend across 1,355 screens. The film would go on to gross a final domestic total of $15.9 million and an approximate total of 3,849,050 admissions, making it the third-least attended film in the franchise, narrowly beating Jason Takes Manhattan (1989) and Jason X (2001). It placed at number 86 on the list of the year's Top 100 earners.

=== Critical response ===
On the Review aggregator website Rotten Tomatoes, Jason Goes to Hell: The Final Friday holds a 11% approval rating, based on 70 reviews. The consensus summarizes: "Jason Goes to Hell: The Final Friday nobly attempts to reinvigorate the franchise's mythology, only to be dragged down by generic slasher tropes, shoddy production, and incoherent plotting." On Metacritic, it has a weighted average score of 17 out of 100, based on 11 critics, indicating "overwhelming dislike".

The Los Angeles Times's Michael Wilmington praised Gant's performance as well as Harry Manfredini's score, but noted "ludicrous characters", "garbled nonstop gore", and poor lighting as notable faults. Richard Harrington of The Washington Post wrote of the film: "The scriptwriters try to conjure some history/mythology to validate the plot's twists and turns, but the whole thing ends up more confusing than Days of Our Lives on fast-forward." Terry Kelleher of Newsday similarly criticized the plot, referring to it as a "confusing mess," though he conceded the film "offers a little humor."

Stephen Holden of The New York Times noted: "The ninth episode in the phenomenally successful series, which began in 1980, The Final Friday is a largely incoherent movie that generates little suspense and relies for the majority of its thrills on close-up gore...Such gratuitous sadism gives The Final Friday an edge of sourness that is unusual for a horror movie. It doesn't help that Jason's intended victims (and the actors who play them) are pallid sitting ducks." The Boston Globe's Betsy Sherman wrote: "First time director Adam Marcus plays around nicely with the F13 cliches, but doesn't have much original to add. The movie has a crowdpleasing final shot that suggests that the real joy ride to hell will be next time around. Maybe."

Writing for Variety, Greg Evans criticized the screenplay as well as Marcus's direction: "With one or two exceptions, freshman director Adam Marcus forgoes the camp humor and inside jokes that marked the tail end of the slasher craze, opting instead for a straightforward Saturday night drive-in approach...Blame Marcus for the film's complete lack of tension and style, but also point a machete or two at a bland, occasionally inept cast and scripters unable to contribute a single innovation to the genre."

Robert Cauthorn of the Arizona Daily Star wrote: "Yeah, there's a lot of shower taking and slaughter here. And a plot about evil bloodlines, tabloid TV, soul shifting, and God knows what else. It doesn't make a lick of sense, but it's a definite improvement over the other non-movies in the series." The Statesman Journal's Ron Cowan wrote: "The ninth version of this fitful series is easily the clumsiest, worst acted, most gory and worst written of the bunch, as ready to indulge in sexual titillation as sadism and oozing bodies." Kory Wilcoxson of The Courier-Journal also criticized the film's gratuitous violence, adding that "the plot is ridiculous, the dialogue wooden and the acting a laugh. But you know that going in. The question is: Is it scary? Not really. It's more disgusting than frightening."

== Other media ==
=== Comic books ===
The unmasked Jason Voorhees from Jason Goes to Hell, as depicted in Friday the 13th: The Game.

A three-issue comic adaptation of Jason Goes to Hell: The Final Friday written by Andy Mangels was published by Topps Comics. As the comics are based upon the original shooting script of the film, elements that were left out of the film are used in them.

=== Trading card ===
Topps also released a series of trading cards for the film.

=== Other references ===
- Freddy Krueger's clawed hand coming out of the ground and taking Jason's mask was a reference to the future crossover Freddy vs. Jason between the two, which had been in development hell since 1987. It was finally finished in 2003, a year after this film's sequel.
- The film features the appearances of the Kandarian dagger and Necronomicon Ex Mortis from Evil Dead II. Jason, Freddy, and Ash Williams would later meet in the comic book series Freddy vs. Jason vs. Ash (a story adapted by writer Jeff Katz from a Freddy vs. Jason 2 screenplay treatment he had written in 2004) and again in Freddy vs. Jason vs. Ash: The Nightmare Warriors.

=== Video games ===
The Jason Goes to Hell depiction of Jason Voorhees is featured in 2017's Friday the 13th: The Game. Because of a continuity error in the film regarding Jason's damaged eye, his in-game character model is mirrored from his movie counterpart. As the Gun Media developers explained, "In [Jason Goes to Hell], everyone kind of knows there was a mistake made with Jason's undermask. It's Jason's left eye that's supposed to be damaged, 'cause in Part 4 he takes the machete to the head. But in [Jason Goes to Hell], it was reversed by accident. So we decided to fix it." The game officially reveals Jason's facial appearance from underneath the mask, which was not seen in the film.
