= House (1985 film) =

1986 American comedy horror film by Steve Miner

- Theatrical release poster
- Directed by: Steve Miner
- Screenplay by: Ethan Wiley
- Story by: Fred Dekker
- Produced by: Sean S. Cunningham
- Starring: William Katt; George Wendt; Richard Moll; Kay Lenz
- Cinematography: Mac Ahlberg
- Edited by: Michael N. Knue
- Music by: Harry Manfredini
- Production companies: New World Pictures; Sean S. Cunningham Films; Manley Productions
- Distributed by: New World Pictures
- Release dates: December 6, 1985 (Limited); February 28, 1986 (U.S.)
- Running time: 92 minutes
- Country: United States
- Language: English
- Budget: $3-3.5 million
- Box office: $22.1 million

House is a 1985 American horror film directed by Steve Miner, with a screenplay by Ethan Wiley, from an original story written by Fred Dekker. Produced by Sean S. Cunningham, the film is the first installment in the House film series, and stars William Katt, George Wendt, Richard Moll, and Kay Lenz. The film centers on Roger Cobb, a troubled author who moves into his late aunt Elizabeth Hooper's seemingly haunted house, and is forced to deal with supernatural phenomena. All the while, he tries to solve the mystery of his son Jimmy's disappearance.

Despite mixed reviews, House grossed $22.1 million worldwide on a $3 million budget, making it a financial success. The film has since gone on to become a cult favorite among genre fans, and was followed by three sequels.

Despite sharing similar themes, it is entirely unrelated to the 1977 Japanese film of the same name.

== Plot ==
Famed author Roger Cobb's son Jimmy vanishes while they visit his aunt Elizabeth Hooper's home, leading to the collapse of his marriage to movie star Sandy Sinclair. When asked, the seemingly senile Elizabeth claims that Jimmy was taken by her house. When Elizabeth later hangs herself, Roger decides to keep her house, and moves in to work on his new book, a memoir of his experiences during the Vietnam War.

After moving in, Roger meets and befriends his neighbor, Harold Gorton, a fan of his books, and begins to have recurring nightmares about the war. Soon after, paranormal phenomena begin to plague him. He sees a monstrous creature in his late aunt's bedroom, a mounted swordfish seemingly comes back to life, and garden tools begin to levitate on their own. Roger also experiences a spectral vision of Elizabeth, who explains that the house "tricked" her into killing herself. When Roger deliriously explains to Harold what's going on, a worried Harold contacts Sandy, asking her to come and check on Roger.

All the while, Roger's nightmares about the war continue, and he recalls his old comrade "Big Ben", a large and boisterous man. One day their group was ambushed by the Viet Cong and Ben was severely wounded by gunfire. Ben begged Roger to mercy kill him to avoid capture, but Roger was unable to bring himself to do so. As Roger fled, Ben was captured by the enemy and tortured to death, leaving Roger with survivor guilt.

Roger is later confronted by a disgusting witch-like creature that briefly takes on Sandy's form, which he shoots, dismembers and buries in his backyard. Hearing the gunshot and seeing Roger carrying something, Harold becomes suspicious of Roger. Later, an attractive neighbor convinces Roger to babysit her toddler son, only for freakish gremlin-like creatures to try to abduct the boy; Roger manages to save him.

After Harold finally witnesses the supernatural phenomena and realizes Roger was telling the truth, Roger learns that the house is connected to a sinister dark dimension of ghosts and monsters. Realizing Jimmy is being held captive in this evil dimension, Roger enters through a portal he discovers in his bathroom medicine cabinet.

Roger manages to find Jimmy and escape back to the human world, but is confronted by Big Ben, now a hideous zombie-like creature. Ben explains that he took Jimmy in order to get revenge for Roger abandoning him in Vietnam. Ben pursues Roger and Jimmy throughout the house, and is eventually able to get the upper hand and recapture Jimmy; Ben demands that Roger kill himself in order to save Jimmy. Roger tries to grab his son, but Ben cuts off his hand with a large hunting knife, only for it to reappear seconds later. Roger realizes that his fear is what gives the house and the monsters their power, and that without it, they're harmless. Roger declares that he's no longer afraid of Ben or the house as Ben begins to panic and stammer out empty threats. Roger snags a grenade off Ben's belt and shoves it into his rib cage, fleeing with Jimmy as Ben explodes, setting a fire that burns the house down.

Outside, Sandy arrives in a taxicab and tearfully reunites with her son as Roger looks on, smiling.

== Cast ==
- William Katt as Roger Cobb
- George Wendt as Harold Gorton
- Richard Moll as Big Ben
- Kay Lenz as Sandy Sinclair
- Mary Stävin as Tanya
- Michael Ensign as Chet Parker
- Susan French as Aunt Elizabeth Hooper
- Erik Silver and Mark Silver as Jimmy Cobb
- Peter Pitofsky as Sandywitch
- Felix Silla as Little Critter
- Elizabeth Barrington as Little Critter
- Jerry Maren as Little Critter
- Dino Andrade as Little Critter (Critter Voices)
- Mindy Sterling as Woman in Bookstore
- Alan Autry as Police Officer
- Steven Williams as Police Officer

== Production ==
House began filming on April 22, 1985. The first two weeks of production comprised shooting exteriors at the estate known today as Mills View, a Victorian style house first built in 1887 and located on Melrose Avenue in Monrovia, California. At the time, the building was owned by two Los Angeles firemen, brothers Brian and John Wade.

Production designer Gregg Fonseca and a crew of five spent about four weeks making modifications to the existing Victorian manor that included repainting the whole of the exterior, bordering the front yard with a wrought iron fence supported by stone pillars, and attaching foam spires to the roof. The back of the house had its clapboard façade covered with brick, and landscapers were brought in to plant flowers and reseed the dying lawn. The yard had no sidewalk at the time, so a faux walkway – made from plywood painted gray to look like concrete, and positioned to lead straight to the front porch – was added as a finishing touch. This sidewalk was pivotal in the finished film. Some time after production, a true concrete walkway was then installed in the same spot, capturing the evil nature of the one in the film.

The final six weeks of production moved operations to Ren-Mar Studios in Hollywood, where two floors of the interior of the Monrovia house were recreated on sound stages. This included sets for the living room, staircase, den and three upstairs bedrooms. On a separate adjacent set, the jungle exteriors for the Vietnam flash-back scenes were also built on sound stages, taking three days to put together.

A total of seven monsters were designed and fabricated for the production. These creatures – which included the obese witch, the zombified corpse of Big Ben (Richard Moll), three demonic kids, the flying skull-faced monster in the void, the plaque-mounted marlin that comes to life and the war demon from the closet – were constructed by seventeen special effects artists, over a period of three-and-a-half months. The war demon, in particular, was an elaborately built puppet, measuring eighteen feet, fully mechanized, operated by fifteen people and featured a fully working lower bowel system. In addition to puppetry and animatronics, stop motion animation and actors in rubber suits were used to create the monsters.

== Release ==
House was given a regional limited theatrical release in the United States on December 6, 1985. Its release expanded to 1,440 theaters on February 28, 1986. According to Box Office Mojo, House grossed $5.9 million in its first wide release weekend, missing first place to Pretty in Pink. The Numbers instead recognises the movie as number-one, and states that it grossed $6.4 million on the same weekend.

By the end of its run, House grossed $22.1 million worldwide, of which $19.4 million was from the North American box office.

== Reception ==
On the review aggregator website Rotten Tomatoes, 49% of 67 critics' reviews are positive. The website's consensus reads: "House crumbles under cheap effects, chaotic tonal shifts, and aimless antics, ending up as a hyperactive, juvenile horror-comedy." Metacritic, which uses a weighted average, assigned the film a score of 44 out of 100, based on five critics, indicating "mixed or average" reviews.

Janet Maslin of The New York Times wrote: "Scares are not its strong suit, but it has a trim, bright look and better performances than might be expected." Variety wrote, "Though much of this nonsense is played tongue-in-cheek, an audience can hardly be expected to swallow the screenplay’s arbitrary approach to Cobb's character." Ryan Pollard at Starburst wrote at the time of the Blu-ray release: "As a film, House is still as much of a warm, at times bonkers, family-friendly horror as it's ever been." Alex Stewart of White Dwarf wrote that although the film has a good premise, it is "squandered on yet another tired old haunted house story" whose supernatural horrors can not compare to the real life trauma of war.

In 1987, Richard Moll and Kay Lenz were nominated for Best Supporting Actor and Best Supporting Actress respectively at the 14th Saturn Awards. Director Steve Miner won a Critics' Award for his work on the film and was nominated for an International Fantasy Film Award.

== Soundtrack ==
The soundtrack for House was released on vinyl, cassette tape and CD in 1987. The soundtrack runs approximately 51:14 and has 25 songs that were featured in House and House II: The Second Story.

== Sequels ==
House successfully launched a film series, with House II: The Second Story in 1987, House III: The Horror Show in 1989 and House IV: The Repossession in 1992. Each film was met with mixed critical and financial reception.

== See also ==
- List of ghost films
