= Manny's Orphans =

1978 American family comedy film by Sean S. Cunningham

- Directed by: Sean S. Cunningham
- Written by: Victor Miller; Steve Miner
- Produced by: Sean S. Cunningham; Steve Miner
- Starring: Jim Baker; Malachy McCourt
- Cinematography: Barry Abrams
- Edited by: Steve Miner
- Music by: Harry Manfredini
- Production company: Sean S. Cunningham Films
- Distributed by: Vestron Video (VHS)
- Release date: September 6, 1978
- Running time: 92 minutes
- Country: United States
- Language: English

Manny's Orphans (also known as Kick!) is a 1978 American family comedy film directed by Sean S. Cunningham. The film was also distributed under the title Kick!.

== Plot ==
Manny (Jim Baker) coaches soccer for the fashionable Creighton Hall school, but is relieved of duty because he is "not a good match" for the school. He finds a job at a Catholic home for orphans, where he forms a new soccer team, with the help of one very good player, Pepe, who turns out to be a girl. Pepe is the sister of one of the orphans, who comes to the all-boy orphanage posing as a boy, because her former foster home was an abusive environment.

Along the way, Manny has incurred a gambling debt, his creditors begin to lean on him, and the boys find out. They set up a soccer game and stake the outcome against Manny's debt. If they win, then the debt shall be forgiven.

== Cast ==
- Jim Baker – Manny
- Malachy McCourt – Father Arch McCoy
- Chet Doherty – Dr. Berryman
- Sel Skolnick – Mr. Caputo
- Xavier Rodrigo – Raoul
- Melissa Valentin – Pepe
- Ari Lehman – Roger

== Production ==
Of the film, writer Victor Miller said: "Steve Miner came up with the idea for it and I wrote the screenplay and we did it, another low-budget film [along with Here Come the Tigers], and shot it around Bridgeport, Connecticut."

Director Cunningham said: "We had this notion of a bunch of orphans in a halfway house, they put together a soccer team and the underdog wins. So we raised the money to do what became known as Manny's Orphans. It was a lot of fun to make, and again I loved working with the kids. I really thought it was going to be a breakthrough film for me." Cunningham also maintains that the reaction was "lukewarm," and although United Artists optioned it as a pilot for a TV series, they did not buy it.
