= King of the Monsters =

King of the Monsters may refer to:

- Godzilla, a fictional character nicknamed the "King of the Monsters"
  - Godzilla, King of the Monsters!, a 1956 American film serving as the American localisation of the original 1954 Japanese film
  - Godzilla, King of the Monsters (comic book), an American comic book series by Marvel
  - Godzilla: King of the Monsters in 3D, an unproduced American film
  - Godzilla: King of the Monsters (2019 film), a 2019 American film
- King of the Monsters (video game), a 1991 video game
  - King of the Monsters 2, a 1992 video game serving as the sequel

== See also ==
Godzilla: King of the Monsters
