= XCU: Extreme Close Up =

2001 thriller film by Sean S. Cunningham

- Directed by: Sean S. Cunningham
- Screenplay by: Tim Schlattmann; John Vorhaus
- Story by: Tim Schlattmann; Marc Alexander
- Produced by: Sean S. Cunningham; Geoff Garrett
- Starring: Susan Egan; Sarah Chalke; Jay Michael Ferguson; Reggie Lee; Danica McKellar
- Cinematography: James Mathers
- Edited by: Nelson Torres
- Music by: Harry Manfredini
- Production company: Crystal Lake Entertainment
- Distributed by: Moonstone Entertainment
- Release date: May 28, 2001
- Running time: 90 minutes
- Country: United States
- Language: English
- Budget: $3 million

XCU: Extreme Close Up is a 2001 thriller film directed by Sean S. Cunningham and starring Susan Egan, Sarah Chalke, Jay Michael Ferguson, Reggie Lee, and Danica McKellar.

== Plot ==
Television producer Karen Webber has built her career on her ability to create top-rated primetime television, but as house mates and crew start turning up dead on the network's hit show, XCU, Karen and her cast of instant celebrities cannot possibly anticipate just how extreme their reality show is about to become.

== Cast ==
- Susan Egan as Karen Webber
- Sarah Chalke as Jane Bennett
- Jay Michael Ferguson as Dylan Dean
- Reggie Lee as Nuey Phan
- Danica McKellar as Sarah
- Ellina McCormick as Cody Ironwood
- A. J. Buckley as Terrance "T-Bone" Tucker
- Careena Melia as Parker Eastman Clarke
- Richard Stay as Matthias Van Blaarderin
- Essence Atkins as Tamikah Jones
- C. Thomas Howell as Geoffrey Liddy
- Brandon J. Muhammad as Tamikah and Jamals Brother

== See also ==
- List of American films of 2001
