= Friday the 13th (1980 soundtrack) =

Soundtrack album by Harry Manfredini
- Released: 1982 (original); January 13, 2012 (limited edition); December 7, 2021 (remastered)
- Recorded: 1980
- Genre: Film score
- Length: 43:41
- Label: Gramavision Records; La-La Land Records

Friday the 13th is the film score composed by Harry Manfredini to the 1980 slasher film of the same name. It is the first instalment in the Friday the 13th franchise. The score was first issued as an LP record by Gramavision Records containing music from the first three instalments. A separate album was issued by La-La Land Records during January 2012, as a "limited edition" 6-CD boxset containing the scores from the first six films, and a remastered edition containing additional and lost cues released during 2021. The score and Manfredini's theme was considered an iconic status, with the theme recurred in forthcoming instalments.

== Background and production ==
When Harry Manfredini began working on the musical score, the decision was made to only play music when the killer was actually present so as to not "manipulate the audience".

Because the killer, Mrs. Voorhees, appears onscreen only during the final scenes of the film, Manfredini had the job of creating a score that would represent the killer in her absence. Manfredini borrows from Jaws (1975), where the shark is likewise not seen for the majority of the film but the motif created by John Williams cued the audience to the shark's invisible menace. The score's strings also recall Bernard Herrmann's score for Psycho.

== Release history ==
In 1982, Gramavision Records released an LP record of selected pieces of Harry Manfredini's scores from the first three Friday the 13th films. On January 13, 2012, La-La Land Records released a limited edition 6-CD boxset containing Manfredini's scores from the first six films. It sold out in less than 24 hours. A vinyl edition of the soundtrack was issued by Waxwork Records during September 2014. In 2021, La-La Land Records released an expanded "Ultimate Cut" edition of the score, featuring a new remaster sourced from the original master tapes, which were considered lost at the time of the 2012 box set's creation, as well as music cues not used or heard in the final film.

== Track listing ==
=== Original La-La Land Records track list ===
No.	Title	Length
1.	"Overlay of Evil / Main Title"	3:33
2.	"Banjo Travelin'"	1:12
3.	"Alice Goes to the Lake" (Parts 1 and 2)	0:36
4.	"Back Up to Annie Alone"	1:34
5.	"Mrs. V Watches"	1:09
6.	"Ralph in the Pantry"	1:30
7.	"Don't Smoke in Bed"	1:02
8.	"Not Tonight, I've Got a Headache"	2:52
9.	"Brenda in Lights"	4:33
10.	"The Bed Axe"	1:58
11.	"Alice Runs to Cabin"	5:04
12.	"Mrs. V Comes Clean"	5:57
13.	"Alice Runs to Light"	2:09
14.	"The Last Fight / The Chop to the End"	1:26
15.	"The Boat on the Water – Closing Theme 1 / Jason in the Lake"	2:26
16.	"Closing Theme"	2:42
17.	"Sail Away Tiny Sparrow" (bonus track)	4:11
Total length:		43:54

=== Expanded edition track list ===
No.	Title	Length
1.	"Overlay of Evil"	1:25
2.	"In the Barn / Main Title"	2:40
3.	"Banjo Travelin'" (source)	1:16
4.	"Alice Goes to the Lake / The Arrow^{[a]}^{[c]}"	0:59
5.	"Say, Isn't That the Road? / Jeepers / Annie Gets It"	2:06
6.	"Transition to Lake^{[a]}^{[c]} / Brenda Sees Something^{[b]}^{[c]}"	1:27
7.	"Death of a Snake^{[b]}^{[c]}"	0:39
8.	"Ralph in the Pantry / Ralph Leaves"	1:32
9.	"Hello, Can I Help You?"	0:40
10.	"Ned in Bed / Don't Smoke in Bed!"	0:36
11.	"Not Tonight Jack, I Have a Headache"	2:55
12.	"Brenda in the Bathroom / Help Me / Brenda in Lights"	4:43
13.	"The Bed Axe / The Light Flash / Lights Out"	1:14
14.	"Alice on the Couch"	0:33
15.	"Bill Hangs Around^{[b]}^{[c]}"	1:34
16.	"Run Alice, Run!"	3:15
17.	"Brenda Drops In"	1:19
18.	"I'm Mrs. Voorhees"	2:28
19.	"Kill Her Mommy"	3:56
20.	"No Place to Hide"	1:01
21.	"Alice Hides in the Pantry^{[a]}^{[c]} / Pantry Fight"	1:52
22.	"Alice Walks Along the Lake^{[a]}^{[c]}"	0:54
23.	"Last Fight"	1:37
24.	"Boat on the Water / Jason in the Lake"	2:28
25.	"Final Shot ^{[a]}^{[c]}"	0:39
26.	"Ned Whistles (Alternate Source)^{[a]}^{[c]}"	0:28
27.	"Värmlandsvisan (Guitar Source)^{[a]}^{[c]}"	0:47
28.	"Ralph in the Pantry / Ralph Leaves (w/o Flanger)^{[a]}"	1:32
29.	"The Bed Axe (w/o Flanger)^{[a]}"	0:20
30.	"Jason Flashback Overlay^{[a]}"	1:16
31.	"Boat on the Water (Complete)^{[a]}"	3:35
32.	"Boat on the Water (Complete w/o Flanger)^{[a]}"	3:35
33.	"Sail Away Tiny Sparrow" (Angela Rotella)	3:07
Total length:		58:28

Notes

- ^{^a} previously unreleased
- ^{^b} contains previously unreleased material
- ^{^c} not in the film

== Reception ==
Music historian Randall D. Larson describes Manfredini's score as "an effectual atonal composition for strings, brass, keyboard and voice." Rachel Reeves, writing for Bloody Disgusting in 2024, praised the score, observing: "More than just beautifully evocative and eerily unsettling, the music is one of the key elements that elevates the film from a copycat cash grab to a worthy slasher successor." Reeves opined that the film's score was mimicked in subsequent slasher films like My Bloody Valentine (1981), The Slumber Party Massacre (1982), A Nightmare on Elm Street (1984), and Candyman (1992).
