= KOTM =

KOTM or KotM may refer to:

- KOTM-FM, a radio station (97.7 FM) licensed to Ottumwa, Iowa, United States
- Ottumwa Industrial Airport (ICAO code KOTM)
- Knights of the Maccabees, a historic fraternal association in Canada and the United States
- King of the Mountain
- King of the Monsters (disambiguation)
