= Crystal Lake Entertainment =

American film production company

Crystal Lake Entertainment Inc.
- Industry: Film production
- Predecessor: Sean S. Cunningham Films
- Founder: Sean S. Cunningham
- Headquarters: 4420 Hayvenhurst Ave. Encino, CA 91436
- Key people: Sean S. Cunningham (Founder/CEO); Noel Cunningham (VP, Production); Christine M. Torres (VP, Development); Blake Reigle (Creative Director)
- Products: Motion pictures

Crystal Lake Entertainment is an American production company. The company was named after the fictional lake from founder Sean S. Cunningham's 1980 film Friday the 13th.

== Filmography ==
- Jason Goes to Hell: The Final Friday (1993) (as Sean S. Cunningham Films)
- XCU: Extreme Close Up (2001)
- Jason X (2001)
- Terminal Invasion (2002)
- Freddy vs. Jason (2003)
- Friday the 13th (2009)
- The Last House on the Left (2009)

== Television ==
- Friday the 13th (announced)
