= Godzilla: King of the Monsters =

Godzilla: King of the Monsters may refer to several articles:

- Godzilla, King of the Monsters!, a 1956 American localization of the 1954 Japanese film Godzilla
- Godzilla: King of the Monsters (2019 film), an American film and sequel to Godzilla (2014)
- Godzilla, King of the Monsters (comic book), a comic book published by Marvel Comics
- Godzilla: King of the Monsters in 3D, an unproduced film project developed in the 1980s
