= House III =

1989 American slasher film

House III: The Horror Show
- Official theatrical release poster
- Directed by: James Isaac; David Blyth
- Written by: Allyn Warner; Leslie Bohem
- Produced by: Sean S. Cunningham
- Starring: Lance Henriksen; Brion James; Rita Taggart; Dedee Pfeiffer; Aron Eisenberg; Thom Bray; Matt Clark
- Cinematography: Mac Ahlberg
- Edited by: Edward Anton
- Music by: Harry Manfredini
- Production companies: United Artists; Sean S. Cunningham Films
- Distributed by: MGM/UA Communications Co.
- Release date: April 28, 1989
- Running time: 95 minutes
- Country: United States
- Language: English
- Budget: $4 million
- Box office: $1.7 million

House III: The Horror Show (also known simply as House III or The Horror Show) is a 1989 American slasher film directed by James Isaac, from a script co-written by Allyn Warner and Leslie Bohem. Produced by Sean S. Cunningham, it serves as the third installment in the House film series. Presented as a standalone installment in the series, it stars Lance Henriksen and Brion James in the lead roles. Centering around Detective Lucas McCarthy, who arrests a serial killer known as Max "The Cleaver" Jenke; the plot revolves around the latter's return from the dead as a malicious spirit to terrorize the detective and his family in their house. The film was followed by House IV. Brion James called this his favorite role.

== Plot ==
Detective Lucas McCarthy finally catches serial killer "Meat Cleaver Max" Jenke and watches his execution. McCarthy is shocked to see the electric chair physically burn Max before he finally dies promising revenge. Max has made a deal with the devil to frame Lucas for his murders from beyond the grave. Max scares the McCarthy family (who have moved into a new house) and the parapsychologist Peter Campbell they hired. Campbell tells Lucas that the only hope of stopping Max for good is to destroy his spirit.

As the family move in, Donna searches the basement to find their missing cat Gazmo. The furnace turns on and the door flings open; apparently Max's spirit is inside the house and focused on the basement. Lucas starts having hallucinations that lead him to behave erratically. Bonnie goes to the cellar to secretly meet her boyfriend Vinnie, who is later killed by a physical manifestation of Max with a cleaver. The next night, Bonnie tells Scott to come with her to look for Vinnie, while Lucas goes to the basement and angrily calls for Max to stay away from his family. Bonnie returns to the basement and finds Vinnie's body for which Lucas is suspected of the murder.

Max kills Scott with the meat cleaver, transforms into Bonnie and decapitates Campbell before holding Donna hostage. Lucas escapes from questioning and goes into the cellar to fight Max. Lucas sends Max to the electric machine where his arm gets stuck, Lucas and Donna use the chair to shock Max causing him to appear back in physical form in the house where Lucas shoots him dead.

The next day the McCarthys are moving out with Scott still alive. Bonnie goes into the basement and runs outside to find Gazmo in a box. The family takes a photo as the screen freezes and fades to black.

== Cast ==
- Lance Henriksen as Detective Lucas McCarthy
- Brion James as Max Jenke
- Rita Taggart as Donna McCarthy
- Dedee Pfeiffer as Bonnie McCarthy
- Aron Eisenberg as Scott McCarthy
- Thom Bray as Peter Campbell
- Matt Clark as Dr. Tower
- David Oliver as Vinnie
- Terry Alexander as Casey
- Lawrence Tierney as The Warden
- Lewis Arquette as Lieutenant Miller

== Production ==
Fred Walton was initially slated to direct the film, but disagreements between him and producer Sean S. Cunningham led to Walton departing the project.

Director David Blyth was replaced by James Isaac a week into shooting as Cunningham was dissatisfied with the dailies. Allyn Warner is credited as writer for the film as Alan Smithee.

The Horror Show was originally developed as an entry into the House film series, but was marketed within the U.S. as unrelated, as the producers felt that it differed greatly and was a traditional horror movie compared to the comedic earlier installments. Despite this, the film kept its original title and was released as House III: The Horror Show outside of the U.S. market. Cunningham was further motivated to distance the film from the House name as House II: The Second Story failed to match the success of its predecessor. Matters were further complicated by the fact the original screenplay was written to be more in tone with the prior House films and included the signature surreal humour, and as part of distancing the film from the House name the script was being reworked during production which was attributed to the accelerated schedule distributor MGM/UA placed the film on.

The film was originally rated "X" by the Motion Picture Association of America (MPAA) for the amount of gore and was later cut down to an R. The uncut footage from the film was later reinstated in a disc release by Arrow Video in 2017.

== Release ==
The Horror Show was released in the United States on April 28, 1989. MGM/UA gave it a limited release theatrically in 444 theaters and it opened in thirteenth place. In total, it grossed $1,738,897 total at the domestic box office.

The film was released as House III in Europe and other foreign markets, but as part of the La Casa series in Italy. On some home video media, the film was released as House III: The Horror Show.

== Critical reception ==
The Horror Show received mostly negative reviews. On Rotten Tomatoes, the film holds a rating of 0%, based on eight reviews.

Critic Roger Ebert gave the film a score of one out of four stars. Stephen Holden of The New York Times wrote, "The Horror Show builds up a good head of suspense, then squanders it in mechanical, poorly staged splatter." AllMovie's reviewer stated, "this film consists of long periods of tedium punctuated by outbursts of graphic gore and surreal effects," while John Kenneth Muir opined that it was "one of those horror movies where the missed potential just cannot escape notice," and that it was also too similar to Wes Craven's Shocker, which was released later that same year.

== Sequel ==
House III was followed by a sequel, House IV: The Repossession in 1992, which was a return to form horror-comedy similar to the first two movies. Each respective film in the series was met with mixed critical and financial reception.

== See also ==
- La Casa series – an Italian rebranding of several otherwise unrelated horror films, including The Horror Show

== Bibliography ==
- Stine, Scott Aaron (2003). The Gorehound's Guide to Splatter Films of the 1980s. McFarland. ISBN 0786415320.
