= House II: The Second Story =

1987 American comedy horror film by Ethan Wiley

- Theatrical release poster
- Directed by: Ethan Wiley
- Screenplay by: Ethan Wiley
- Story by: Fred Dekker
- Produced by: Sean S. Cunningham
- Starring: Arye Gross; Jonathan Stark; Royal Dano; Lar Park Lincoln; John Ratzenberger
- Cinematography: Mac Ahlberg
- Edited by: Martin Nicholson
- Music by: Harry Manfredini
- Production companies: New World Pictures; Sean S. Cunningham Films; Manley Productions
- Distributed by: New World Pictures
- Release date: August 28, 1987
- Running time: 88 minutes
- Country: United States
- Language: English
- Budget: $3 million
- Box office: $10 million

House II: The Second Story is a 1987 American comedy horror film written and directed by Ethan Wiley from an original story by Fred Dekker. It serves as the second installment in the House film series, and is a standalone sequel to the first movie. While the plots and characters are unrelated, House II involves a storyline centered around a new mansion with a supernatural connection. The tone is highlighted with a greater focus on comedy, with a tone even lighter than the original.

House II: The Second Story was released on August 28, 1987, grossing $10 million worldwide against a $3 million budget and received negative reviews from critics.

In the film, Jesse McLaughlin and Kate, a duo of yuppies, settle in an old family mansion, and learn of the existence of a crystal skull owned by Jesse's ancestor Gramps. They decide to exhume Gramps, in order to see if the skull was among his grave goods. Instead, they accidentally revive Gramps in the form of a zombie. The mansion contains time portals into other historical eras, and the characters time travel to the Jurassic, to the Aztec Empire, and to the American Old West. They bring back animals and people from the past, but eventually decide to permanently settle in the Old West.

== Plot ==
A duo of yuppies, Jesse McLaughlin and his girlfriend Kate, move into an old mansion that has been in Jesse's family for generations. They are soon joined by Jesse's goofy friend Charlie Coriell, who brought along his diva girlfriend Lana, in the hopes of being discovered by Kate, who works for a record company.

Jesse has returned to the old family mansion after his parents were murdered when he was a baby. While going through old things in the basement, Jesse finds a picture of his great-great-grandfather (and namesake) in front of an Aztec temple holding a crystal skull with sapphires in the eyes. In the background is a man Jesse learns is Slim Reeser, a former partner of his great-great-grandfather turned bitter enemy after a disagreement over who would get to keep the skull.

Reasoning that the skull must be buried with him, Jesse and Charlie decide to dig up Jesse's great-great-grandfather in the hopes of procuring the skull. They unearth the casket only to be attacked by the corpse, who then shows himself to be friendly when Jesse reveals his identity as the senior Jesse's great-great-grandson. Jesse and Charlie take the cowboy zombie, nicknamed "Gramps", back to the house, where he is horrified to learn that the skull has not rejuvenated his body as he had hoped.

Gramps and Charlie go out drinking and driving, and later the boys listen for hours to Gramps' stories of the Old West and his outlaw life. Gramps explains that the house was built using stones from the Aztec temple, and that its rooms act as a hidden doorway across space and time, with the skull acting as a key. He charges Charlie and Jesse with defending the skull against the forces of evil, who are drawn to possess the skull.

During an impromptu Halloween party thrown by Charlie, Gramps makes an appearance (though he is overlooked as it is a costume party), Kate leaves Jesse (taking Lana with her) after he is seen with an old girlfriend by her smarmy boss John Statman, and Jesse and Charlie pick up two new pets in the Jurassic era, a baby pterodactyl and a caterpillar-dog that's dubbed a Cater-Puppy, after a barbarian/caveman arrives at the party and steals the skull.

Bill Towner, an electrician and "part-time adventurer", arrives to inspect the house's old wiring. While seemingly a buffoon, he pulls a short sword from his tool case and leads the boys through "one of those time-portal things...you see these all the time in these old houses." In the mystic past, the three fight off a group of Aztec warriors and rescue an Aztec virgin who was about to be sacrificed.

Eventually, a zombified Slim Reeser makes his appearance. Still after the skull, Slim shoots Gramps who then gives Jesse his guns and reveals that it was Slim who shot and killed Jesse's parents when he was a baby. Jesse jumps through a window into the Old West, and eventually succeeds in killing Slim by blasting off his head with a rifle. Gramps, who has been mortally wounded, begins to pass away. Gramps says goodbye to Jesse and tells him he is so happy to have met his great-great-grandson. Gramps then gives a final warning about the power of the skull, encouraging Jesse to get what he wants from the enchanted object and then get rid of it. As Gramps passes, Jesse embraces him.

The film ends with the revelation that Jesse used the skull to travel back into the Old West, where he, Charlie and the rest of their friends drive off in a wagon on a new adventure, leaving the crystal skull behind, marking Gramps' new grave.

== Cast ==
- Arye Gross as Jesse McLaughlin
- Jonathan Stark as Charlie Coriell
- Royal Dano as Gramps McLaughlin
- Bill Maher as John Statmen
- John Ratzenberger as Bill Towner
- Lar Park Lincoln as Kate
- Amy Yasbeck as Lana / Puce Glitz
- Dwier Brown as Clarence
- Gregory Walcott as Sheriff
- Jayne Modean as Rochelle
- Dean Cleverdon as "Slim" Reeser
- Lenora May as Judith
- Kane Hodder as Gorilla (also stunt coordinator)
- Frank Welker as the voices of Slim Reeser, Baby Pterodactyl and Cater Puppy
- Devin DeVasquez as The Virgin
- Gus Rethwisch as Arnold, The Barbarian
- Gil Birmingham as Featured Warrior

== Production ==
Discussions of a sequel to House began shortly after completion of the first film as rave test screenings immediately led to producer Sean S. Cunningham looking into potential follow-ups. Ethan Wiley was hired to write and direct the film, under its initial title House II: The Unexpected, after serving as a writer on the previous film with both Wiley and Cunningham opting to take the series into an anthology direction retaining the tone and humor of the prior film while following a new set of characters in a new location. The idea of going for an anthology approach came from Wiley himself as he felt there was nothing more that could be done with the same house or characters of the first film without feeling boring or redundant.

The exterior shots of the house were of Stimson House.

== Release ==
House II had an original release date of July 10, but was pushed back and later released in the United States on August 28, 1987, by New World Pictures in 1069 theaters. It opened in ninth place with an opening weekend tally of $2,573,934. It ended its U.S. theatrical run with a total of $7,800,000.

== Reception ==
On the review aggregator website Rotten Tomatoes, 15% of 20 critics' reviews are positive. Metacritic, which uses a weighted average, assigned the film a score of 31 out of 100, based on seven critics, indicating "generally unfavorable" reviews.

Ryan Pollard at Starburst wrote: "House II doesn't quite have anything similar to the strong performance of the original's Bill Katt anchoring the picture, but it still has plenty to make it a worthwhile follow-up that's definitely worth watching.". Creature Feature gave the movie two of five stars, finding it inferior to the first movie.

== Comic adaptation ==
In October 1987, Marvel Comics released a comic book adaptation of House II. It was written by Ralph Macchio, with artwork by Alan Kupperberg on pencils and Kupperberg, Hilary Barta, Danny Bulanadi, Jose Marzan Jr. and Pat Redding on inks. Its cover price was $2.

== Sequels ==
House II was followed by two sequels, with House III: The Horror Show in 1989 and House IV: The Repossession in 1992. Each film was met with mixed critical and financial reception.

== See also ==
- La Casa (film series), an Italian rebranding of several otherwise unrelated horror films, including House II
- List of ghost films
