= The Art of Marriage =

1970 American white coater film by Sean S. Cunningham

- Theatrical release poster
- Directed by: Sean S. Cunningham
- Written by: Sean S. Cunningham
- Produced by: Sean S. Cunningham
- Production company: Nevada Institute For Family Studies
- Release dates: March 25, 1970 (Washington, D.C.); April 1, 1970 (Los Angeles); July 12, 1970 (Sweden)
- Running time: 60 minutes
- Country: United States
- Language: English
- Budget: $3,500
- Box office: $100,000

The Art of Marriage is a 1970 American white coater film directed by Sean S. Cunningham in his directorial debut.

== Production ==
Sean Cunningham, a Broadway director, went into the film business in 1969. He gathered three crew members, and with a budget of $3,500, he shot The Art of Marriage. He said that he had no idea of what he was doing when he filmed the movie. He did not even think he had to have three crew members.

== Release ==
The film was released in a couple of theaters in 1970. Word-of-mouth made it a hit by the standards of its time, grossing $100,000. Cunningham used $50,000 from the profits to rent his first office.

The production also attracted the interest of filmmaker Wes Craven, who in 1971 would be an associate producer on Cunningham's next movie Together—Craven's first film credit.

== See also ==
- List of American films of 1970
