= Steve Miner =

American film and television director (born 1951)

- Born: Stephen C. Miner; June 18, 1951 (age 75); Chicago, Illinois, U.S.
- Occupations: Film director Television director Producer

Stephen C. Miner (born June 18, 1951) is an American director of film and television, film producer, and a member of the Motion Picture Academy of Arts and Sciences. He is notable for his work in the horror genre, including House (1985), Warlock (1989), Halloween H20: 20 Years Later (1998), Lake Placid (1999), and Day of the Dead (2008). Miner's involvement in the Friday the 13th franchise began an assistant director on the first film and he went on to direct Friday the 13th Part 2 (1981), Friday the 13th Part III (1982), and Jason (2027). He has also directed numerous comedy and drama films, as well as episodes of notable television series including The Wonder Years, Dawson's Creek, and Smallville.

== Life and career ==
Miner was born in Chicago, Illinois.

He began work in the film industry as a recurring collaborator of producer-director Sean S. Cunningham, filling in for various behind the scenes roles on films such as The Last House on the Left and Friday the 13th. His directorial debut was the latter film's first sequel, and he directed the third entry less than a year later. In 1983, Miner acquired the rights from Toho to develop an American Godzilla film titled Godzilla: King of the Monsters in 3D, with Miner attached as the director. Miner hired Fred Dekker to write the script and William Stout for storyboards and concept art. Miner generated some interest in Hollywood but was unable to secure financing and let the rights revert to Toho.

Miner went on to direct other horror films such as Warlock, Halloween H20: 20 Years Later, and Lake Placid. Miner first crossed over into the comedy genre with his 1985 cult horror-comedy House, and has since gone on to direct other films in the genre including Soul Man and Big Bully. Miner is the only director to have crossed over and directed more than one of the horror "Big 3" (Halloween / Michael Myers, Friday the 13th / Jason Voorhees and A Nightmare on Elm Street / Freddy Krueger).

Miner has since become a notable television director on shows like Smallville, Psych, Felicity, Dawson's Creek (including the pilot and four of the other episodes of the first season), and Diagnosis: Murder. His work on The Wonder Years earned him a Primetime Emmy nomination for Outstanding Comedy Series and a DGA Award for Outstanding Directing in a Comedy Series.

On November 13, 2026, it was announced that Miner would return to direct the next installment in the Friday the 13th franchise titled Jason, scheduled for release in August 2027.

== Filmography ==
=== Film ===
Director

- Friday the 13th Part 2 (1981) (also producer)
- Friday the 13th Part III (1982)
- House (1985)
- Soul Man (1986)
- Warlock (1989) (also producer)
- Wild Hearts Can't Be Broken (1991)
- Forever Young (1992)
- My Father the Hero (1994)
- Big Bully (1996)
- Halloween H20: 20 Years Later (1998)
- Lake Placid (1999)
- Texas Rangers (2001)
- Day of the Dead (2008)
- Private Valentine: Blonde & Dangerous (2008)
- Jason (2027)

=== Actor ===
Year	Title	Role	Notes
1972	The Last House on the Left	Hippie Taunting Deputy	Uncredited role
1982	Friday the 13th Part III	Newscaster	Cameo
1998	Halloween H20: 20 Years Later	School Financial Advisor	Uncredited role
1999	Lake Placid	Airplane Pilot	Uncredited role
2008	The Days Before Belvedere	Service Station Worker	Uncredited role

Other credits

Year	Title	Role
1972	The Last House on the Left	Production assistant and assistant editor
1973	Case of the Full Moon Murders	Editor and second unit director
1975	Video Vixens	Assistant editor
1978	Here Come the Tigers	Producer, second unit director, and editor
1978	Manny's Orphans	Story writer, editor, and producer
1980	Friday the 13th	Associate producer, assistant director, and unit production manager
1986	Night of the Creeps	Second unit director

=== Television ===
TV movies

- Maverick Square (1990) (Also executive producer)
- Sherwood’s Travels (1994)
- Texas Graces (1996)
- The Third Degree (2001)
- Home of the Brave (2002)
- Scarlett (2006)

TV series

Year	Title	Director	Producer	Notes
1988	The Wonder Years	Yes	Supervising	9 episodes
1989	CBS Summer Playhouse	Yes	No	Episode "B-Men"
1990	Elvis	Yes	No	6 episodes
1992	Laurie Hill	Yes	No	Episode "Pilot"
1993	Against the Grain	Yes	No	Episode "Pilot"
1994	Chicago Hope	Yes	No	Episode "Shut Down"
1995	Raising Cane's	Yes	No	
1996	Diagnosis: Murder	Yes	No	Episode "An Explosive Murder"
1997	Relativity	Yes	No	Episode "The Day the Earth Moved"
1997	The Practice	Yes	No	Episodes "Hide and Seek" and "Dog Bite"
1998	Dawson's Creek	Yes	Yes	4 episodes
1999	Wasteland	Yes	No	Episode "Pilot"
2000	Felicity	Yes	No	Episode "The Christening"
2001	Kate Brasher	Yes	No	Episode "Georgia"
2002	Smallville	Yes	No	Episode "Duplicity"
2003	Miss Match	Yes	No	Episodes "Miss Communication" and "Who's Your Daddy?"
2003	Karen Sisco	Yes	No	Episode "Nostalgia"
2004	Jake 2.0	Yes	No	Episode "Upgrade"
2004	Summerland	Yes	No	Episode "Skipping School"
2004	North Shore	Yes	No	Episode "Alexandria"
2005	Wildfire	Yes	Co-executive	Episode "Pilot" and "Trust"
2008	The Ex List	Yes	No	Episode "Art Professor"
2008	Psych	Yes	No	Episode "Talk Derby to Me"
2009-2012	Make It or Break It	Yes	No	4 episodes
2009	Eureka	Yes	No	Episode "Insane in the P-Brane"
2010	The Gates	Yes	Yes	Episode "Identity Crisis"
2011-2017	Switched at Birth	Yes	No	19 episodes
2014-2015	Chasing Life	Yes	No	9 episodes
2015-2016	Stitchers	Yes	Executive	4 episodes
2016	Dead of Summer	Yes	No	Episode "She Talks to Angels"
2018	Once Upon a Time	Yes	No	Episode "Knightfall"

== Bibliography ==
- Ryfle, Steve (1998). Japan's Favorite Mon-Star: The Unauthorized Biography of the Big G. ECW Press. ISBN 1550223488.
