= Terminal Invasion =

2002 science fiction television film by Sean S. Cunningham

- Screenplay by: Lewis Abernathy; John Jarrell; Robinson Young
- Directed by: Sean S. Cunningham
- Starring: Bruce Campbell; Chase Masterson
- Music by: Harry Manfredini
- Countries of origin: United States; Canada
- Original language: English

Production
- Producers: Sean S. Cunningham; Geoff Garrett; Paul M. Leonard; Derek Rappaport; Chuck Simon
- Cinematography: Rudolf Blahacek
- Editor: Patrick McMahon
- Running time: 84 minutes
- Production companies: Amber Light Films Inc. Crystal Lake Entertainment; S Pictures; The Sci-Fi Channel

Original release
- Release: September 14, 2002

Terminal Invasion is a 2002 science fiction television film directed by Sean S. Cunningham and starring Bruce Campbell and Chase Masterson. The plot involves a group of aliens disguised as humans who take over an airport in preparation for an invasion of Earth. A pilot and a convicted murderer fight back.

== Plot ==
A convicted murderer is being transported across the highway in a blizzard when the police wagon crashes into a tree. The officers and the prisoner, Jack, make their way through the blizzard to a small airport. In the restroom the officers are killed by an alien disguised as a preacher, who reveals a plan to invade and take over Earth. Jack kills the alien, who disintegrates.

The pilot and the passengers awaiting their flight in the airport believe that Jack the prisoner killed the policemen until another woman is killed in a scuffle and her body also disintegrates. The other passengers tie Jack to a post and urge the pilot to fly out but she refuses due to the dangerous blizzard conditions. A businessman awaiting an important meeting threatens the pilot with a gun and shoots a human serviceman who stands in his way, killing him. Jack escapes and takes the gun back from the businessman.

The baggage x-ray machine reveals that an elderly woman is an alien and she kills the airport security guard. Radio communications do not work and the pilot goes to the hangar, where she uses a radio found by children there. The children belong to no one and reveal themselves as aliens while Jack escapes with the pilot. They locate a two-person biplane and he convinces her to fly him to Canada to escape prosecution.

The other passengers barricade themselves in the lounge, refusing to let the alien children in. They discover boxes containing a gun for clearing avalanches and use it to fight off the children when they come attacking through the back of the vending machine but two more passengers are killed.

The pilot and Jack crawl back to the main hall through the air ducts and rescue the surviving passengers along the way before the aliens make their way into the lounge. Together they all return to the hangar, losing the businessman to aliens along the way. On the surveillance camera they see that one of the passengers, Darien, is still alive in the lounge. The pilot and Jack sneak back to save him, narrowly avoiding a pursuing alien and setting it ablaze with gasoline as they escape to the hangar.

Just as the pilot is about to fly Jack away they receive a phone call Darien disguises his voice as the pilot, screaming that Jack the prisoner has been killing the passengers. Darien, a leader in the alien invasion, holds them at gunpoint places mind-controlling handcuffs on one of the passengers to make her state that Jack is the killer. The pilot refuses to wear the handcuffs and will not blame Jack for the killings. Jack seems to accept the alien's offer to allow him to escape and let the others die but then explains that he removed the bullets from that gun. Together the surviving humans work to throw the alien into a moving propeller, killing it. As the police sirens are closing in the pilot fulfills her promise and flies Jack to Canada.

== Cast ==
- Bruce Campbell as Jack
- Chase Masterson as Cathy Garrett
- C. David Johnson as David Higgins
- Kedar Brown as Darian
- Andrew Tarbet as Andrew Philips
- Sarah Lafleur as Sarah Philips
- Marcia Bennett as Gloria
- Chuck Byrn as Del
- Jason Jones as Sergeant Griffin
- Stephen Joffe as Stephen
- Hannah Lochner as Hannah
- Dylan Bierk as Angie
- Ian Downie as Reverend Callaghan
- Scott Wickware as Officer "Red"
- Jake Simons as Officer Tommy

== Production ==
Terminal Invasion was filmed in Toronto, Canada, as a co-production between the United States and Canada. Its working title was Devil's Pass.

== Broadcast ==
The film was first broadcast on The Sci-Fi Channel on September 14, 2002.
