= James Isaac =

American film director

- Born: June 5, 1960
- Died: May 6, 2012 (aged 51)
- Occupations: Film director; producer; special effects supervisor
- Years active: 1983–2012

James Isaac (June 5, 1960 – May 6, 2012) was an American film director and visual effects supervisor.

== Career ==
James Isaac was born June 5, 1960.

Isaac began work in film in the early 1980s creating the creatures in films such as Return of the Jedi and Gremlins. He continued his work into the 1980s with Enemy Mine, House II: The Second Story and DeepStar Six. He made his directorial debut on The Horror Show after the original director left the project a week into shooting.

He also worked with director David Cronenberg on his films The Fly, Naked Lunch and eXistenz. His other 1990s work included being a special effects supervisor for Chris Wales Inc. on Look Who's Talking Too and Virtuosity. He returned to directing in the 2000s, working on Jason X, Skinwalkers and Pig Hunt.

Isaac died of blood cancer on May 6, 2012.

== Select filmography ==
Title	Year	Credited as			Notes	Ref(s)
Title	Year	Director	Special effects	Other	Notes	Ref(s)
Return of the Jedi	1983		Yes		Credited as Creature tech.	
Gremlins	1984		Yes		Credited as part of the Creature crew	
House II: The Second Story	1987		Yes		Special effects coordinator	
The Kiss	1988			Yes	Make-up crew	
Deepstar Six	1989		Yes		Credited as Visual effects supervisor	
House III: The Horror Show	1989	Yes				
Arachnophobia	1990		Yes			
Look Who's Talking Too	1990		Yes		Credited as the Project Supervisor	
eXistenZ	1999		Yes		Visual and special effects supervisor	
Jason X	2001	Yes		Yes	Executive producer	
Skinwalkers	2006	Yes				
Pig Hunt	2008	Yes		Yes	Co-producer; final film	
His Name Was Jason: 30 Years of Friday the 13th	2009			Yes	Documentary film, himself	
Crystal Lake Memories: The Complete History of Friday the 13th	2013			Yes	Documentary film, himself (archival footage); posthumous release, dedicated in memory	

== Bibliography ==
- Lentz III, Harris M. (2013). Obituaries in the Performing Arts, 2012. McFarland. ISBN 9781476603858.
- Stine, Scott Aaron (2003). The Gorehound's Guide to Splatter Films of the 1980s. McFarland. ISBN 0786415320.
