= Jim B. Baker =

American actor (1941–2014)

- Born: July 12, 1941; Great Falls, Montana, U.S.
- Died: February 4, 2014 (aged 72); Conrad, Montana, U.S.
- Occupation: Actor
- Years active: 1971–2007
- Spouse: Mary Eichholz (m. 1974–2014)

James B. Baker (July 12, 1941 – February 4, 2014), sometimes credited as Jim B. Baker, was an American stage, film and television actor. He was best known for his stage work in regional repertory theatre and for his role as tightwad banker Farley Waters on the short-lived 1980–81 CBS sitcom Flo, a spin-off of Alice.

== Life and career ==
Baker was born on July 12, 1941, in Great Falls, Montana, the only child of Lloyd and Ferne Baker, who ran a real estate and insurance business in Conrad where he was raised. His first foray into acting came as a student while attending the University of Montana where he spent his summers performing at the Oregon Shakespeare Festival and the Bigfork Playhouse. After a tour of duty with the United States Army during the Vietnam War, Baker plunged himself into acting. By 1971, he had earned a spot with the Milwaukee Repertory Theater in Wisconsin.

Following his debut as a soccer coach in the low-budget comedy film Manny's Orphans, Baker and his wife Mary moved to Los Angeles in 1979 where he was soon cast as the greedy and obnoxious banker Farley Waters opposite Polly Holliday on the short-lived CBS sitcom Flo (1980–81), a spin-off of Alice. After Flo was cancelled, he made several guest appearances on television shows such as The Dukes of Hazzard, Silver Spoons and Simon & Simon. By 1986, Baker had left Hollywood behind him and joined the Denver Centre Theatre Company in Denver, Colorado, where he remained for the next eight years, performing in productions of Cat on a Hot Tin Roof, A Christmas Carol as well as dramatic roles in the Arthur Miller plays Death of a Salesman, The Price and All My Sons.

Baker was also a member of the resident acting companies at San Francisco's American Conservatory Theater, Actors Theatre of Louisville and the Guthrie Theater in Minneapolis. In 1995, Baker returned to the Milwaukee Repertory Theater where he began his career 24 years before and continued to work there until 2006, when he injured his back while rehearsing for the lead role in a production of King Lear. In 2007, he and his wife Mary retired to their home in Conrad, Montana.

== Death ==
Baker, who suffered from lung and heart disease, died on February 4, 2014, after collapsing at a Montana hotel where he and his wife were staying. He was 72.

== Filmography ==
Year	Title	Role	Notes
1978	Manny's Orphans	Manny	Alternative title: Kick!
1980–81	Flo	Farley Waters	Main cast (28 episodes)
1981	Private Benjamin	Sgt at Firing Range	Episode: "Judy Got Her Gun"
1982	The Dukes of Hazzard	Jasper Fenwick	Episode: "Shine on Hazzard Moon"
1982	Open All Night		Episode: "Scam"
1982	Silver Spoons	Highway Hank	Episode: "The Great Computer Caper"
1983	Silver Spoons	Alan Watenmaker	Episode: "Twelve Angry Kids"
1984	CBS Schoolbreak Special	Uncle Phil	Episode: "All the Kids Do It"
1985	Scandal Sheet		TV movie
1985	Simon & Simon	Ollie	Episode: "Simon Without Simon: Part 1"
