= Together (1971 film) =

1971 film by Sean S. Cunningham

- Poster
- Directed by: Sean S. Cunningham
- Written by: Sean S. Cunningham
- Produced by: Wes Craven; Sean S. Cunningham
- Starring: Marilyn Chambers
- Cinematography: Amin Q. Chaudhri; Roger Murphy
- Edited by: Roger Murphy
- Distributed by: Hallmark Releasing; American International Pictures
- Release date: December 1971
- Running time: 72 minutes
- Country: United States
- Language: English

Together is a 1971 film directed by Sean S. Cunningham. Cunningham's first film The Art of Marriage had attracted Wes Craven, who wanted to be in the film business. This was Craven's first credit. Cunningham and Craven would later work on The Last House on the Left.

== Premise ==
A mockumentary about sex in America.

== Cast ==
- Marilyn Chambers as Herself (credited as Marilyn Briggs)
- Maureen Cousins as Herself
- Sally Cross as Herself
- Erica Hagen as Herself (credited as Jade Hagen)
- Vade Hagren as Herself
- Kimi Hoelter as Herself
- Victor Mohica as Himself (credited as Vic Mohica)
- Jan Welt as The Narrator (credited as Jan Pieter Welt)

== Production ==
With the $100,000 profit from The Art of Marriage, Cunningham rented his first office and began looking for another picture to shoot. He started collecting donations from family and friends, who contributed $1,000 each in some cases. Cunningham said The Art of Marriage was good (in terms of starting him off) but "crummy" and wanted to make a better version of the film. Cunningham shot the film Together, which was intended in some ways to be a remake of Marriage. After Together was shot Cunningham hired the struggling Wes Craven, who needed a job and was interested in getting into the film business. Cunningham was doing re-shoots for Together and hired Craven to synchronize the dailies from the three- to four-day reshoot. Craven then became assistant editor, and he and Cunningham had to mix without any income. There was a scene in the film that consisted of Marilyn Chambers and a "very handsome" black man. The scene involved Chambers running a yellow flower down the man's penis. Hallmark Releasing had never seen a scene like this before and wanted to exploit it. They subsequently bought the film for $10,000.

== Release ==
They placed ads in the papers about the film and the theater was flooded with people wanting to see it. The line was said by Cunningham to have gone all the way around the block. The film grossed a lot of money (in Cunningham's words, "phenomenal business") and it was another big film for Cunningham and the first hit that Craven worked on. Cunningham and Craven said to Hallmark that if they wrote them a check, Cunningham and Craven would think of another film to do. Cunningham was offered $90,000 by Hallmark to do a scary film and they would later go on to make The Last House on the Left. The film was re-released in 1973 to capitalize on the notoriety Marilyn Chambers received after it was revealed she was the mother on the Ivory Snow soap box who also was starring in the X-rated hardcore pornographic film Behind the Green Door.

According to Bloody Disgusting, the film "was a [commercial] success".

== See also ==
- List of American films of 1971
