= Here Come the Tigers =

1978 American sports comedy film by Sean S. Cunningham

- Theatrical release poster
- Directed by: Sean S. Cunningham
- Written by: Arch McCoy
- Produced by: Sean S. Cunningham; Steve Miner
- Starring: Richard Lincoln; James Zvanut; Samantha Grey
- Cinematography: Barry Abrams
- Edited by: Steve Miner
- Music by: Harry Manfredini
- Production company: Sean S. Cunningham Films
- Distributed by: American International Pictures
- Release date: May 26, 1978
- Running time: 87 minutes
- Country: United States
- Language: English
- Budget: $250,000
- Box office: $1 million

Here Come the Tigers is a 1978 American sports comedy film directed by Sean S. Cunningham.

== Plot ==
"A wild team of misfits think that they can make it big. What's a coach to do with a chronic nose-picker, a flatulent fielder, an out of control pitcher, a juvenile delinquent and the prettiest girl in the state? Turn this bunch of losers into a winning team! When their new coach enlists an unusual new teammate, it's a whole new ballgame as they band together to win their first championship, determined to prove that losers can be winners, too."

== Cast ==
- Richard Lincoln – Eddie Burke
- James Zvanut – Burt Honneger
- Samantha Grey – Bette Burke
- Manny Lieberman – Felix the Umpire
- William Caldwell – Kreeger
- Fred Lincoln – Aesop
- Xavier Rodrigo – Buster
- Sean Patrick Griffin – Art "The Fart" Bullfinch

== Production ==
Cunningham said in Crystal Lake Memories: The Complete History of Friday the 13th (2005) he believed that the film cost $250,000 to make, "if that. It could be much lower. It was guerrilla filmmaking. It was all kids from the little leagues; it was like being on a three-week field trip with a bunch of sixth-graders. It was good and bad, frustrating and exciting. I loved it."

Victor Miller, who wrote the film under the pseudonym Arch McCoy, said: "Those were the days when everybody said, 'What America needs is a good G-rated movie.' I guess Here Come the Tigers made its money back, but they lied about America wanting G-rated films."

== Reception ==
Variety called it a ripoff of The Bad News Bears (1976), trying to cash in on the success of the original and its sequel, with dull direction and dreadful acting.
