= VCX =

Protein-coding gene in the species Homo sapiens

Identifiers
- Aliases: VCX, VCX-10r, VCX-B1, VCX1, VCX10R, VCXB1, variable charge, X-linked, variable charge X-linked
- External IDs: OMIM: 300229; HomoloGene: 88395; GeneCards: VCX; OMA:VCX - orthologs

Gene location (Human)
Chr.	X chromosome (human)
Band	Xp22.31	Start	7,842,262 bp
Band	Xp22.31	End	7,844,143 bp
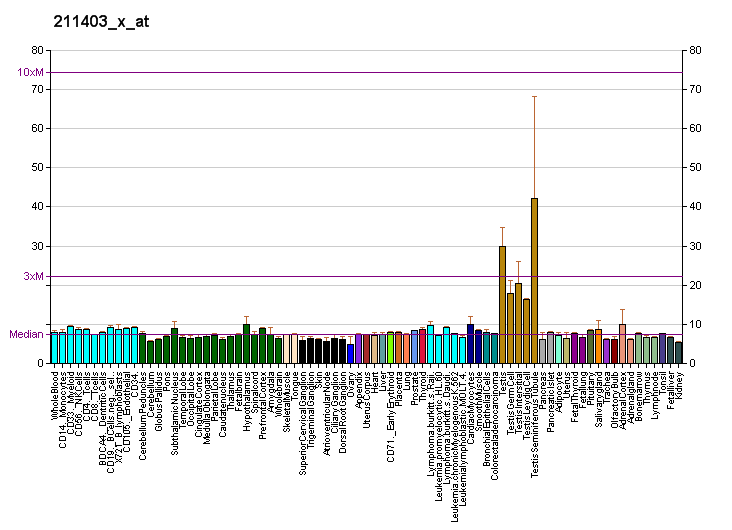

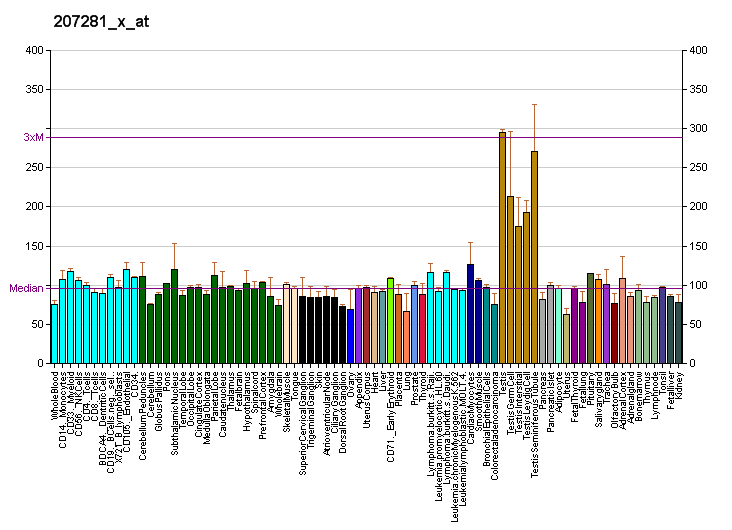
RNA expression pattern
Bgee	Human / Mouse (ortholog); Top expressed in: right testis; left testis; gonad; testicle; ventricular zone; putamen; right uterine tube; primary visual cortex; nucleus accumbens; duodenum / n/a; More reference expression data
BioGPS	More reference expression data
Gene ontology
Molecular function	chromatin binding
Cellular component	nucleolus; nucleus
Biological process	ribosome assembly; chromatin organization; spermatogenesis; brain development
Sources:Amigo / QuickGO
Orthologs
Species	Human	Mouse
Entrez	26609	n/a
Ensembl	ENSG00000182583	n/a
UniProt	Q9H320	n/a
RefSeq (mRNA)	NM_013452; NM_001393662	n/a
RefSeq (protein)	NP_038480	n/a
Location (UCSC)	Chr X: 7.84 – 7.84 Mb	n/a
PubMed search		n/a
- Wikidata
View/Edit Human

Variable charge X-linked protein 1 is a protein that in humans is encoded by the VCX gene.

This gene belongs to the VCX/Y gene family, which has multiple members on both X and Y chromosomes, and all are expressed exclusively in male germ cells. The X-linked members are clustered on chromosome Xp22 and Y-linked members are two identical copies of the gene within a palindromic region on Yq11. The family members share a high degree of sequence identity, with the exception that a 30-bp unit is tandemly repeated in X-linked members but occurs only once in Y-linked members. The VCX gene cluster is polymorphic in terms of copy number; different individuals may have a different number of VCX genes. VCX/Y genes encode small and highly charged proteins of unknown function. The presence of a putative bipartite nuclear localization signal suggests that VCX/Y members are nuclear proteins. This gene contains 10 repeats of the 30-bp unit.
