= My Boyfriend's Back (film) =

1993 United States film

- Theatrical release poster
- Directed by: Bob Balaban
- Written by: Dean Lorey
- Produced by: Sean S. Cunningham
- Starring: Andrew Lowery; Traci Lind; Bob Dishy; Danny Zorn; Paul Dooley; Edward Herrmann; Mary Beth Hurt; Cloris Leachman; Austin Pendleton; Jay O. Sanders; Paxton Whitehead
- Cinematography: Mac Ahlberg
- Edited by: Michael Jablow
- Music by: Harry Manfredini
- Production companies: Touchstone Pictures; Sean S. Cunningham Films
- Distributed by: Buena Vista Pictures Distribution
- Release date: August 6, 1993
- Running time: 84 minutes
- Country: United States
- Language: English
- Budget: <$10 million
- Box office: $3.3 million (US)

My Boyfriend's Back is a 1993 American zombie horror comedy film directed by Bob Balaban which tells the story of Johnny Dingle (Andrew Lowery), a teenage boy who returns from the dead as a zombie to meet Missy McCloud (Traci Lind), the girl he is in love with, for a date. The film received negative reviews.

The film's title is a reference to the 1963 song of the same name by The Angels (which is used in the promotional trailers, but not featured in the film itself). The original title of the film, Johnny Zombie, was changed shortly before the film's theatrical release. Philip Seymour Hoffman, Matthew McConaughey, and Matthew Fox appear in small roles in the film.

== Plot ==
Johnny Dingle has been in love with Missy McCloud since they were kids. In his senior year of high school, he decides to fake a robbery at Missy's job with his best friend, Eddie. He hopes that by stopping the "robbery" he will impress her and she will go to the prom with him.

During the "robbery" a real robber holds Johnny and Missy at gunpoint. Thinking that the robber is Eddie, Johnny dies taking a bullet meant for Missy. After the funeral, Johnny rises from the grave. He is greeted by Murray the gravedigger, who warns him that he can not leave the cemetery. Johnny ignores him and goes back to his home.

Missy is hesitant to be around Johnny, but changes her mind when her boyfriend Buck and his dim-witted friend Chuck discriminate against him for being a Zombie. They go on a date, which goes well until Missy accidentally rips Johnny's ear off.

Johnny goes to the town doctor, Dr. Bronson, who refers him to a woman named Maggie, the widow of a zombie. She tells Johnny that he needs to eat the flesh of the living to stop decaying.

Johnny and Missy meet up at the library, where he is attacked by Buck and Chuck. Chuck accidentally hits himself in the head with an ax and dies. Johnny eats Chuck's body, invoking the wrath of Chuck's father, Big Chuck.

Missy's father, the town sheriff, tells Johnny to leave town for his own safety. Johnny doesn't listen and returns to Missy at night, but leaves when he bites her arm. He is captured by Dr. Bronson, who attempts to dissect Johnny and create a youth formula from his zombie cells. Johnny escapes when Big Chuck leads a mob to kill him, with Missy and Eddie helping him. He flees to the cemetery, where Murray, his parents, Eddie, and Missy defend him, earning him the town and the sheriff's acceptance. Johnny and Missy dance, but Johnny begins to decay and dies.

In Heaven, he is told by the gatekeeper that he was not meant to die in the robbery (which is why he came back as a zombie), and he is sent back to the moment before the robber entered. The events replay but Johnny survives this time due to the bullet hitting Missy's locket. Johnny and Missy go to the prom as a couple, with Johnny's voiceover explaining that the only thing he would have changed about the whole experience was that he would have eaten Buck.

== Cast ==
- Andrew Lowery as Johnny Dingle
- Traci Lind as Missy McCloud
- Danny Zorn as Eddie
- Bob Dishy as Murray the Gravedigger
- Paul Dooley as Big Chuck
- Edward Herrmann as Mr. Dingle
- Mary Beth Hurt as Mrs. Dingle
- Cloris Leachman as Maggie the Zombie Expert
- Austin Pendleton as Dr. Bronson
- Jay O. Sanders as Sheriff McCloud
- Paxton Whitehead as Judge in Heaven
- Matthew Fox as Buck Van Patten
- Philip Hoffman as Chuck Bronski
- Libby Villari as Camille McCloud
- Matthew McConaughey as Guy #2
- Renée Zellweger (scenes cut)

== Production ==
A script, initially consisting mainly of comic sketches about a teenage boy transforming into a zombie, was presented to writer Dean Lorey by a friend, who asked him to develop a cohesive story. In September 1992, Touchstone Pictures initiated development on the project, then titled Johnny Zombie. Actor-director Bob Balaban became involved in October 1992 after receiving the script in August 1992, giving him only a few weeks to prepare for production. Balaban enlisted several actors from his previous collaborations, including Austin Pendleton, Mary Beth Hurt, Cloris Leachman, and Jules Feiffer. The film marked the cinematic debuts of Matthew Fox and Matthew McConaughey. Renée Zellweger's only scene was cut from the film.

Principal photography commenced on November 2, 1992, in the Hill Country region of central Texas, encompassing locations such as Austin, the Georgetown town square, and the C. D. Fulkes Middle School in Round Rock. The eight-week shoot used a budget of less than $10 million. Shortly before its theatrical release, the title was altered to My Boyfriend’s Back, contributing to a trend of recent films adopting titles from popular songs.

== Reception ==
=== Critical reception ===
Rotten Tomatoes, a review aggregator, reports that 13% of 23 surveyed critics gave the film a positive review; the average rating was 3.4/10. Audiences polled by CinemaScore gave the film an average grade of "C−" on an A+ to F scale.

Variety called it "an idiotic offbeat comedy" that "repeats ideas and jokes more effectively used in his 1989 Parents." Stephen Holden of The New York Times wrote, "If My Boyfriend's Back is an irredeemably silly movie, it has an engaging lightness of tone and uniformly impeccable performances by a cast that maintains just the right attitude of deadpan parody." Kevin Thomas of the Los Angeles Times called it "an awful teen horror comedy" and said it "has a disastrous tone of sunny sitcom jauntiness" when it should have focused on dark satire. Mark Caro of the Chicago Tribune wrote, "The movie is full of nonsensical plot twists, embarrassingly broad performances and unappealing characters." Caro criticized the casting of Lowery, calling his character "perhaps the least interesting movie zombie ever". Jeff Shannon of the Seattle Times wrote, "Simply put, absolutely none of it works. The movie utterly fails to set a foundation for its dark fantasy, effectively turning every character into a moron." Ty Burr of Entertainment Weekly rated it "D" and compared it negatively to Heathers. Academic Peter Dendle called it the best of the zombie romantic comedy films of the late 1980s and early 1990s but criticized its use of family-friendly themes as "cheesy" and "saccharine".

=== Themes ===
Peter Dendle identifies the themes of the film as being standard teen film tropes. Dingle's urges to eat his date are a metaphor for teenage sexual activity, and his fear of decomposition is teenage anxiety over acne. As a zombie, Dingle is discriminated against and ostracized, which is meant to show zombies as outsiders.

== See also ==
- List of zombie films
- Mort the Dead Teenager: 1993 comic book series with plot similarities to the film.
