= Mature Pictures Corp. =

Mature Pictures Corp was a New York based film distribution company that specialized in sexploitation and hardcore pornographic films. It is reported to have been owned by Sam Lake, who established the videotape releasing company Quality-X-Pix in the late 70s.
