= Mac Ahlberg =

Swedish director and cinematographer (1931–2012)

- Born: 12 June 1931; Stockholm, Sweden
- Died: 26 October 2012 (aged 81); Cupra Marittima, Italy
- Occupations: Director; cinematographer

Mac Ahlberg (12 June 1931 – 26 October 2012) was a Swedish film director and cinematographer.

== Biography ==
In the years 1952–1954 he was married to Ulla Olofsson (1923–2009) and 1955–1961 to the actress Anna-Greta Bergman. He had a daughter Annina Rabe (b. 1963) together with the script and TV producer Ruth Rabe (1934–1992). He was later married to Mary LaPoint Ahlberg until his death.

The first feature Ahlberg directed was the Danish erotic classic I, a Woman (Denmark, 1965) which went on to international success, especially in the United States. He quickly became identified with erotic fare, directing two sequels to I, a Woman as well as a Swedish version of Fanny Hill (Sweden, 1968), starring Diana Kjær and Oscar Ljung. During the 1970s, he developed a conspicuous collaboration with actress Marie Forså.

Ahlberg moved to the United States in the late 1970s and worked mostly as a cinematographer on American productions; he was frequently hired by producer Charles Band, and worked on such Band productions as Re-Animator (1985), From Beyond (1986), and Dolls (1987), all three of which were directed by Stuart Gordon.

== Death ==
Ahlberg died from complications of congestive heart failure on 26 October 2012. He was 81.

== Select filmography ==
Year	Title	Cinematographer	Director	Screenwriter	Notes	Ref.
1959	Konstfack	Yes	No	No	Television film	
1959	Åke och hans värld	Yes	No	No	Television film	
1961	Gäst hos verkligheten	Yes	No	No	Television film	
1963	Hatten eller Trollkarlens melodier	Yes	No	No	Television film	
1963	Ingmar Bergman Makes a Movie	Yes	No	No		
1965	The Cats	Yes	No	No		
1965	I, a Woman	Yes	Yes	No		
1966	Ormen	Yes	No	No		
1967	The Reluctant Sadist	Yes	Yes	No		
1968	I, a Woman – Part II	Yes	Yes	No		
1968	Fanny Hill	Yes	Yes	Yes		
1970	The Daughter: I, a Woman Part III	Yes	Yes	No		
1974	Around the World with Fanny Hill	No	Yes	Yes		
1980	Hell Night	Yes	No	No		
1982	The Seduction	Yes	No	No		
1982	Parasite	Yes	No	No		
1983	My Tutor	Yes	No	No		
1983	Chained Heat	Yes	No	No		
1983	The Graduates of Malibu High	Yes	No	No	Alternate title: Young Warriors	
1984	The Dungeonmaster	Yes	No	No		
1984	Trancers	Yes	No	No		
1985	Ghoulies	Yes	No	No		
1985	Re-Animator	Yes	No	No		
1985	House	Yes	No	No		
1986	From Beyond	Yes	No	No		
1987	Dolls	Yes	No	No		
1987	House II: The Second Story	Yes	No	No		
1988	Ghost Town	Yes	No	No		
1989	DeepStar Six	Yes	No	No		
1989	House III	Yes	No	No	Alternate title: The Horror Show	
1990	Robot Jox	Yes	No	No		
1991	Oscar	Yes	No	No		
1992	Innocent Blood	Yes	No	No		
1993	My Boyfriend's Back	Yes	No	No		
1993	Striking Distance	Yes	No	No		
1994	Beverly Hills Cop III	Yes	No	No		
1995	The Brady Bunch Movie	Yes	No	No		
1996	A Very Brady Sequel	Yes	No	No		
1997	Good Burger	Yes	No	No		
1998	The Wonderful Ice Cream Suit	Yes	No	No		
2003	Puppet Master: The Legacy	Yes	No	No		
2003	Mega Scorpions (a.k.a. Stingers/Deadly Stingers)	Yes	No	No		
