= Sean S. Cunningham =

American filmmaker (born 1941)

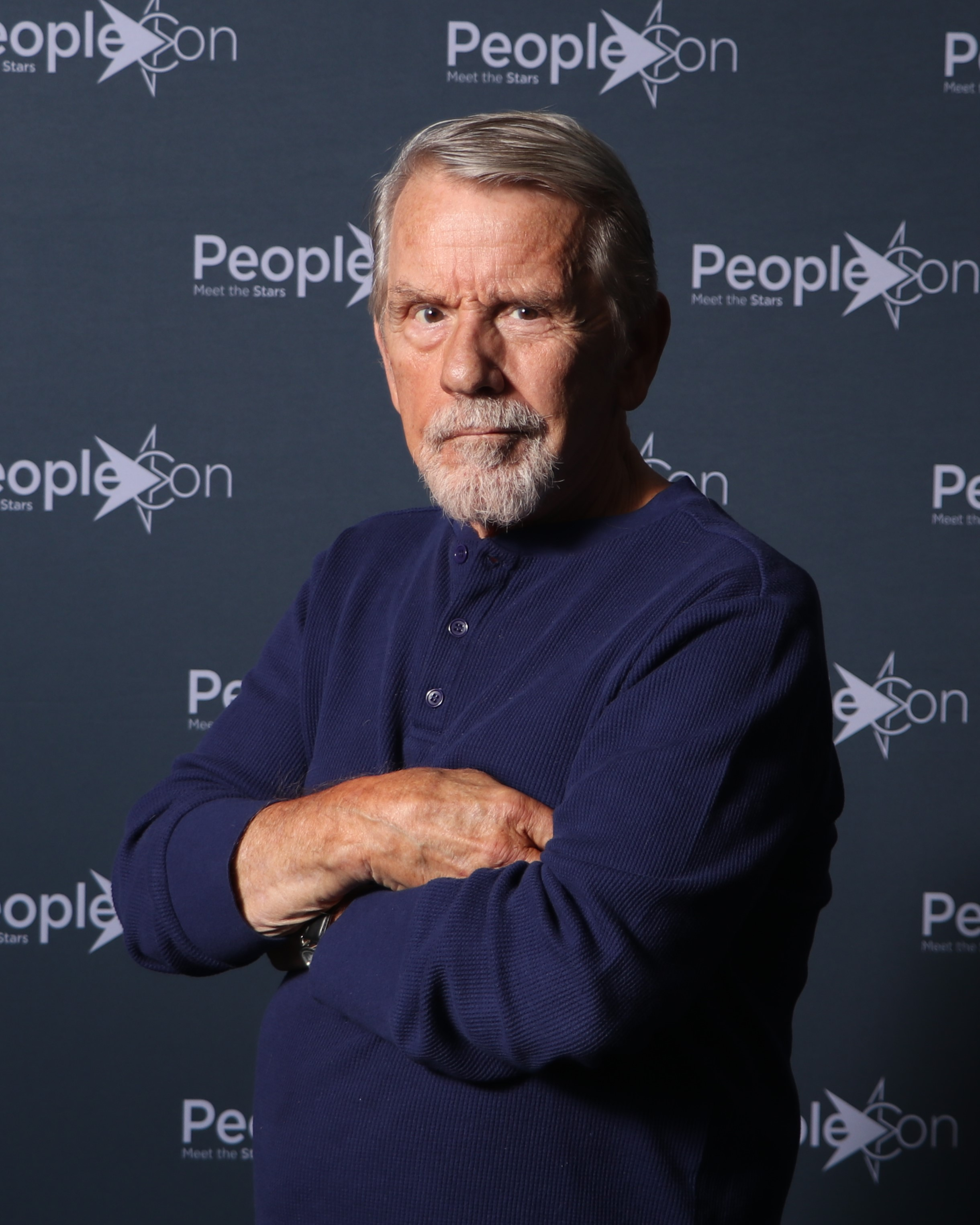
- Cunningham in 2024
- Born: Sean Sexton Cunningham; December 31, 1941 (age 84); New York City, U.S.
- Education: Franklin & Marshall College; Stanford University
- Occupations: Film director; writer; producer
- Years active: 1970–present
- Spouse: Susan E. Cunningham
- Children: 4

Sean Sexton Cunningham (born December 31, 1941) (Note: Some sources cite December 1, 1941 as Cunningham's birthdate, while others claim December 31, 1941.) is an American filmmaker. He is best known for directing and producing several horror films, beginning in the early 1970s.

Raised in Connecticut, Cunningham graduated from Franklin & Marshall College before earning an MFA from Stanford University. After completing his education, he worked as a manager for various theater companies, including New York City's Lincoln Center and the Oregon Shakespeare Festival. While working for a documentary company in New York, Cunningham made his feature film directorial debut with The Art of Marriage (1970). While editing his second film, he met Wes Craven, with whom he collaborated as a producer of Craven's exploitation horror film The Last House on the Left (1972).

Cunningham went on to co-create and direct the slasher film Friday the 13th (1980), which was a major box-office success. He produced several horror films throughout the 1980s, including House (1985) and its sequel House II: The Second Story (1987).

== Early life ==
Cunningham was born in New York City on December 31, 1941 and raised in Connecticut. He graduated with a Bachelor of Arts degree from Franklin & Marshall College and later earned an MFA from Stanford University.

== Career ==
Cunningham's first jobs after graduating from Stanford included managing theater companies such as New York's Lincoln Center, the Mineola Theater on Long Island, as well as the Oregon Shakespeare Festival, the latter of where he briefly studied. He is a member of the Academy of Motion Picture Arts and Sciences and the Directors Guild of America.

While working for a documentary company in New York City in the late 1960s, Cunningham made his directorial debut with The Art of Marriage (1970). While editing Together, he met Wes Craven, who was working as an editor at the time. The two collaborated on Craven's directorial debut, the exploitation film The Last House on the Left (1972), which Cunningham produced.

Cunningham is best known for his involvement of multiple films in the Friday the 13th franchise, which introduced the fictional mass murderer Jason Voorhees. Of the 13 films in the series, the ones that had Cunningham's involvement were the original, Jason Goes to Hell: The Final Friday, Jason X, Freddy vs. Jason, and the 2009 reboot. He has also produced many horror films, such as the House series and Wes Craven's debut feature, The Last House on the Left. He is the founder and CEO of Crystal Lake Entertainment. Cunningham was set to produce the CW series adaption of Friday the 13th before that project fell through, and served as a producer of Friday the 13th: The Game.

As of 2015, he is also a member of the board of advisers for the Hollywood Horror Museum.

In 2025, Cunningham was honoured at the 58th Sitges Film Festival with the Time Machine Award (The Màquina del Temps).

== Filmography ==
=== Film ===
Year	Title	Director	Producer	Writer
1970	The Art of Marriage	Yes	Yes	Yes
1971	Together	Yes	Yes	Yes
1972	The Last House on the Left	No	Yes	No
1974	Case of the Full Moon Murders	Yes	Yes	No
1978	Here Come the Tigers	Yes	Yes	No
1978	Manny's Orphans	Yes	Yes	No
1980	Friday the 13th	Yes	Yes	No
1982	A Stranger Is Watching	Yes	No	No
1983	Spring Break	Yes	Yes	No
1985	The New Kids	Yes	Yes	No
1985	House	No	Yes	No
1986	Reiselust	No	Yes	Yes
1987	House II: The Second Story	No	Yes	No
1989	DeepStar Six	Yes	Yes	No
1989	House III	No	Yes	No
1992	House IV	No	Yes	No
1993	My Boyfriend's Back	No	Yes	No
1993	Jason Goes to Hell: The Final Friday	No	Yes	No
2001	XCU: Extreme Close Up	Yes	Yes	No
2001	Jason X	No	Executive	No
2002	Terminal Invasion	Yes	Executive	No
2003	Freddy vs. Jason	No	Yes	No
2006	Trapped Ashes	Yes	No	No
2009	Friday the 13th	No	Yes	No
2009	The Last House on the Left	No	Yes	No
2009	His Name Was Jason: 30 Years of Friday the 13th	No	Executive	No
2017	The Nurse with the Purple Hair	Yes	Yes	No
2026	The Night Driver	No	Executive	No

=== Short film ===
Year	Title	Director	Writer
2015	The 'Thing'	Yes	No
2019	The Music Teacher	Yes	Yes

=== Acting roles ===
- 2013 Crystal Lake Memories: The Complete History of Friday the 13th - Himself (Documentary film)

== Works cited ==
- Corman, Tod; Cregan, John, eds. (2003). Celluloid Crime of the Century. The Last House on the Left (DVD, documentary featurette). Anchor Bay Entertainment.
- LoBrutto, Vincent (2002). The Encyclopedia of American Independent Filmmaking. Santa Barbara, California: Greenwood Press. ISBN 9780313301995.
- Roberts, Jerry (2009). Encyclopedia of Television Film Directors. Scarecrow Press. ISBN 9780810863781.
