= Fred Dekker =

American film director and writer

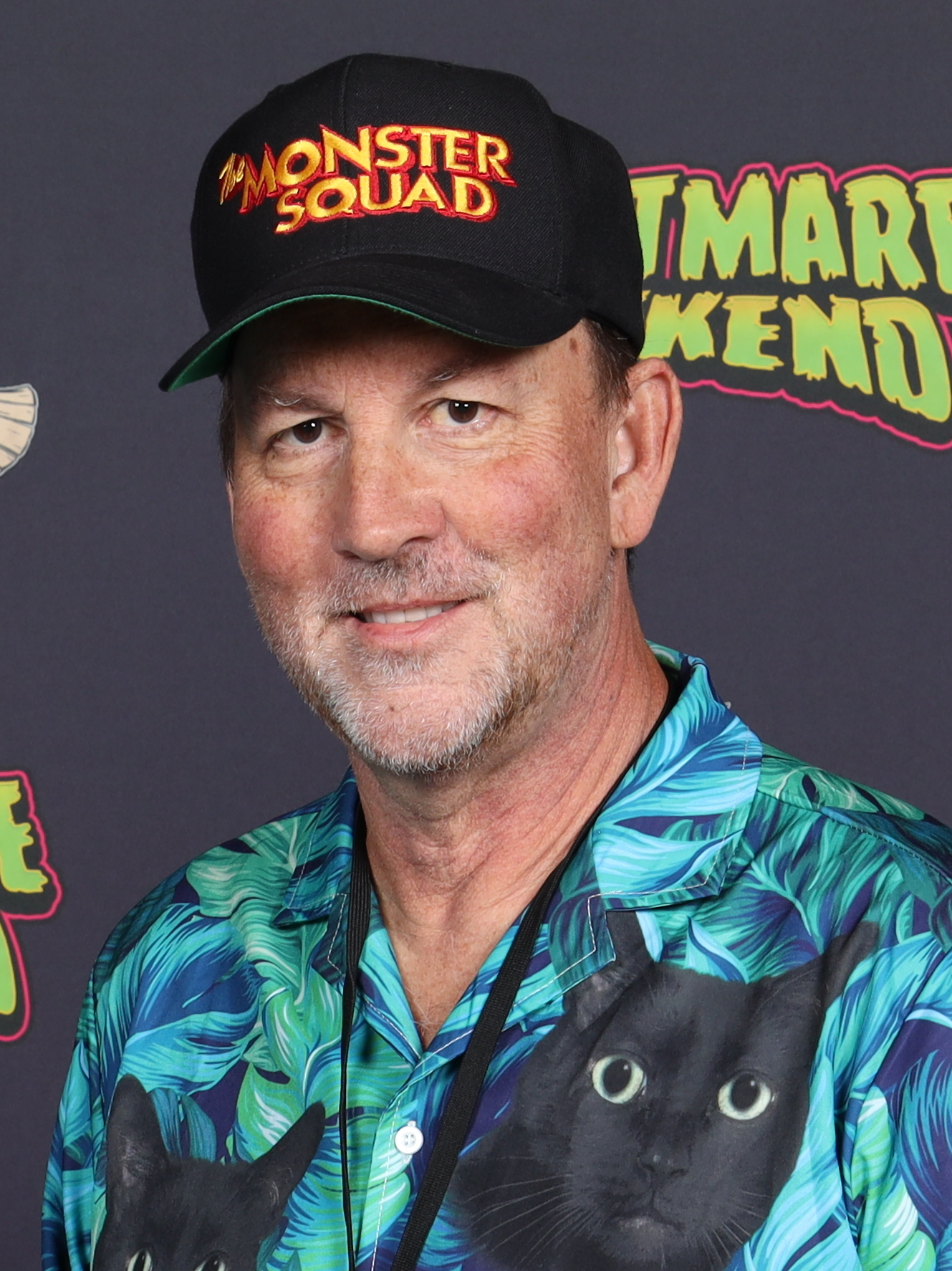
- Dekker in 2024
- Born: April 9, 1959 (age 67); San Francisco, California, U.S.
- Occupations: Film director; film producer; screenwriter
- Awards: Brussels International Fantastic Film Festival Silver Raven Award

Fred Dekker (born April 9, 1959) is an American screenwriter and film director best known for his cult classic horror comedy films Night of the Creeps and The Monster Squad (written with Shane Black). He contributed the story ideas for House (1985) and Ricochet (1991), and also directed and co-wrote RoboCop 3 with Frank Miller. One of his earliest movies was a short film he made in college titled Starcruisers, directed in the early 1980s.

== Life and career ==
Dekker was born on April 9, 1959, in San Francisco and was raised in the Bay Area. He attended the UCLA School of Theater, Film and Television in the mid-1980s.

In 1983, film director Steve Miner hired Dekker to write the script for Godzilla: King of the Monsters in 3D, a project which went unproduced. Dekker's first success came in 1985: a 15-page Twilight Zone-inspired script and an original story that was expanded into a full screenplay by writer Ethan Wiley for what would become the comedy horror film House. The film was nominated for the International Fantasy Film Award at the Fantasporto Film Festival, and earned its director Steve Miner the Critics' Award at the Avoriaz Fantastic Film Festival. The next year, Dekker made his directorial debut with Night of the Creeps, the script for which was written in only a week. The film, an homage to B-movies of the 1950s and 60s, has since become a cult classic.

His next film The Monster Squad was co-written with his friend and long-time collaborator Shane Black. It is an homage to the Universal "monster cycle" of films produced between the early 1930s and mid-1950s. Like his previous film, it has since become a cult classic. Dekker subsequently wrote five episodes of the Tales from the Crypt television series, and directed one. He co-wrote the neo-noir Ricochet and the spy comedy If Looks Could Kill. His return to the director's chair came in 1992 when he directed the third installment in the Robocop series, co-writing the screenplay with comic book writer Frank Miller. The film, which had its release delayed by a year due to the bankruptcy of Orion Pictures, received negative reviews from critics and audiences. Dekker has since gone on to accept blame for the film's negative reception.

Dekker worked as a script doctor, making uncredited contributions to films including Lethal Weapon 4, and Titan A.E.. He also wrote three episodes of Star Trek: Enterprise in the early 2000s. In 2015, after a lengthy hiatus, he returned to filmmaking by co-writing a television pilot, Edge, for Amazon Studios, with Black. He co-wrote the 2018 film The Predator with Black, who also directed the film.

== Filmography ==
=== Film ===
| Year | Title | Director | Writer |
|---|---|---|---|
| 1985 | House | No | story |
| 1986 | Night of the Creeps | Yes | Yes |
| 1987 | The Monster Squad | Yes | Yes |
| 1987 | House II: The Second Story | No | story |
| 1991 | Ricochet | No | story |
| 1991 | If Looks Could Kill | No | story |
| 1993 | RoboCop 3 | Yes | Yes |
| 2018 | The Predator | No | Yes |

=== Uncredited works ===
- Demolition Man (1993)
- Lethal Weapon 4 (1998)
- Titan A.E. (2000)

=== Unproduced works ===
- Godzilla: King of the Monsters in 3D (1983)
- Shadow Company (1988)
- Jonny Quest (1995)

=== Television ===
| Year | Title | Director | Writer | Notes |
|---|---|---|---|---|
| 1989–92 | Tales from the Crypt | Yes | Yes | Wrote 4 episodes Directed episode "The Thing From the Grave" |
| 2001–02 | Star Trek: Enterprise | No | Yes | Also consulting producer Wrote 3 episodes |
| 2015 | Edge | No | Yes | TV movie |

== Awards ==
- 1988 Brussels International Fantastic Film Festival Silver Raven Award: The Monster Squad (won)
