= Godzilla: King of the Monsters in 3D =

Unproduced film project

Godzilla: King of the Monsters in 3D is an unproduced American film project that was developed in 1983 by Steve Miner, with Miner attached to direct the film. Miner shopped the project around Hollywood and generated some interest, but was unable to secure funding and let the rights revert to Toho. The project was the first attempt to produce a Godzilla film at an American film studio.

== Plot ==
A meteorite collides with an American defense satellite which triggers a nuclear missile to launch towards the Earth. The missile detonates in the middle of the South Pacific, which awakens a giant reptilian creature on the ocean floor. A Japanese fishing vessel is towed to San Francisco for examination after it recently disappeared. Journalist Dana Martin sneaks onto the ship and finds a perfectly preserved trilobite. She finds a burnt survivor whose last words are "Gojira".

Martin takes the trilobite to paleobiologist and dinosaur expert, Gerald Balinger, who seems skeptical about the fossil's authenticity. On Oto Island in Tahiti, an American Special Forces squad come into contact with a giant reptilian monster, who lays waste to nearby villages. Navy Colonel Peter Daxton leads an investigation off the coast of Mexico for a mysteriously sunken Russian submarine. The investigation is secretly being observed by Russian spies and Daxton's old enemy, Boris Kruschov, who wishes to retrieve the sub's two nuclear missiles.

Daxton finds a video onboard which reveals that the sub fired one of the missiles on a giant reptilian creature. The missiles are then taken into military custody pending negotiations with Russia. Daxton returns home to San Francisco and his son, Kevin, only to be called back for another mission. Daxton, Kevin, and Balinger are taken to Baja, Mexico where the carcass of a reptile "the size of a house" has washed ashore. Daxton recognizes it as the same creature from the video.

Balinger theorizes that the creature is a dinosaur, however, the military disregard his theories and assume it came from another planet. As Balinger and Kevin watch the military transport the body, Balinger names the creature "Godzilla", based on an old Japanese myth about a dragon. Off the coast of California, the adult Godzilla surfaces and destroys an oil derrick and a tanker. The dead Baby Godzilla is stored at a warehouse at the Presidio for studying purposes.

Balinger becomes alarmed when researchers who came into contact with the body begin suffering from radiation poisoning. Balinger deduces that the Baby is a living atomic reactor with regenerative properties. Since the sea disasters continued even after the Baby's death, Balinger concludes that the adult Godzilla is coming to the city, but the military disregard his ideas again. Kruschov kidnaps Kevin and demands that Daxton exchange the missiles as ransom. Kevin manages to escape just as Godzilla rises from San Francisco Bay.

The military attack the beast but to no effect, which angers Godzilla into a rampage. Daxton, Balinger, and Martin plan to lure Godzilla out of the city with a recording of the Baby taken from the submarine video and kill it with the Russian missiles. As Daxton flies the helicopter carrying the missiles, Kruschov appears onboard with Kevin and demands the missiles be returned. After a brief fight, the helicopter crashes and Kruschov lands in Godzilla's hand, where he is incinerated by Godzilla's atomic breath.

Godzilla finds the warehouse holding its offspring and unleashes a mournful roar after discovering the Baby dead. Balinger and Martin turn on the Baby's recording at Alcatraz Island, which attracts Godzilla's attention. Daxton drags the remaining missile onto the Scorpion-78, a high-tech prototype battle helicopter. The co-pilot falls off as the Scorpion-78 lifts off and Kevin takes the co-pilot's place. As Daxton flies the chopper, Kevin reluctantly fires the missile into Godzilla's throat, which successfully kills the monster. Kevin falls off the Scorpion-78, but is saved by Godzilla. Kevin weeps as Godzilla takes its last breath.

== Development ==
=== Conception ===
"I had always been a fan [of Godzilla] since I was a kid. Once seeing it as an adult, I realized that this could be remade as a good movie. My original idea was to do it in 3-D. I had just done Friday the 13th in 3D, and wanted to do a good movie in 3D, and I thought the miniatures would lend themselves to doing good 3-D effects. So it was a combination of trying to do a really good monster movie and doing it in 3-D. I had to get the rights, so I went to Japan and made a deal with the Toho people to co-finance the development of the project, myself and Toho."

— Miner on the origins of the project.

In 1983, American filmmaker Steve Miner approached Toho, the owners of Godzilla, about a Hollywood-produced Godzilla film with a big budget, A-list actors, and high-priced special effects. Miner had stated to have "always been a fan of Godzilla" and found that the character could be remade into a potentially "good movie". Miner struck a co-financing deal with Toho for the development of the project.

=== Writing ===
Miner hired Fred Dekker to write the screenplay, who completed the first draft in a few weeks. Miner would later admit that he hired Dekker "on a fluke". Dekker had stated the reason why Miner hired him was because Dekker was not a Godzilla fan, finding the original films to be "cheesy", stating, "He did not want to make a cheesy film, and I wasn't interested in just special effects and knocking buildings down. The first thing I said to Steve was, 'If all this movie is about is this big monster destroying buildings, we're screwed.'"

Dekker was not influenced by the original Toho films, having never seen a Godzilla film all the way through. Dekker instead took inspiration from Steven Spielberg films and James Bond films. Dekker wanted to write an action adventure with an Irwin Allen quality that would have been interesting even without Godzilla in it. Dekker gave the character "Peter Daxton" an eyepatch as an homage to Dr. Serizawa from the original Godzilla film. Dekker also wrote a character named "Dana Martin" ("Dana Kryer" in the first draft), who was to be based on Steve Martin originally played by Raymond Burr in Godzilla, King of the Monsters!. Burr was also considered for a cameo. Powers Boothe and Demi Moore were considered for Daxton and Martin.

=== Storyboards ===
A shot of the storyboard by William Stout

Miner hired William Stout to provide storyboards and concept art. Stout later convinced Miner to hire him as the film's production designer. Stout was excited about doing a state-of-the-art Godzilla film, feeling that their version would be executed better than the original. Stout created hundreds of storyboards, completing 80% of the special effects sequences. Stout convinced Miner to hire Doug Wildey, Dave Stevens, and several other artists to help him complete the storyboards. Stout offered Alex Toth to join the project but he turned it down. On how he approached the new design of Godzilla, Stout stated, "I designed him as a cross between the classic Godzilla and a Tyrannosaurus".

=== Special effects ===
A special subtitled screening of the Japanese version of the original Godzilla film was held at Century City to generate interest for the project amongst special effects artists. Miner intended to use miniatures, stop-motion animation, and suitmation, as there were no computer effects available at the time. David W. Allen was hired to provide the stop-motion effects. Allen managed to build a stop-motion prototype while Stephen Czerkas created an articulated stop-motion animation figure. Rick Baker was hired to build a full scale animatronic Godzilla head, but never got around to building it.

== Cancellation ==
The project was shopped to several studios until Miner "ran out of studios", according to Stout. Miner had considered asking Dekker to write a more budget-friendly version of the script, feeling that the original vision was too expensive and "too big". Dekker partially attributed the project's demise due to the fact that Miner was not a big-name director at the time, stating, "If Steven Spielberg or Sidney Pollack or Jim Cameron said, 'I want to make Godzilla,' they'd give it a green light in a minute. I just think that he [Miner] just wasn't enough a player at the time." Miner verified that most studios were interested and nearly struck a deal with Warner Bros. but the project was deemed too expensive due to the budget reaching $25 million to $30 million. Jon Peters and Keith Barish had also shown interest in the project. Miner let the rights revert to Toho due to being unable to secure financing. Miner stated that the production of The Return of Godzilla put a "big hold" on the project.
