= House IV =

1992 direct-to-video comedy horror film by Lewis Abernathy

- Promotional poster
- Directed by: Lewis Abernathy
- Screenplay by: Geof Miller; Deirdre Higgins
- Story by: Geof Miller; Deirdre Higgins; Jim Wynorski; R.J. Robertson
- Produced by: Sean S. Cunningham; Debbie Hayn-Cass
- Starring: Terri Treas; Scott Burkholder; Melissa Clayton; William Katt
- Cinematography: James Mathers
- Edited by: Seth Gaven
- Music by: Harry Manfredini
- Production companies: New Line Cinema; Sean S. Cunningham Films
- Distributed by: New Line Home Video; RCA/Columbia Pictures Home Video
- Release date: January 29, 1992
- Running time: 94 minutes
- Country: United States
- Language: English
- Budget: $1,600,000 (estimated)

House IV is a 1992 direct-to-video comedy horror film directed by Lewis Abernathy, from a script co-written by Geoff Miller and Deidre Higgins. Produced by Sean S. Cunningham and Debbie Hayn-Cass, it serves as the fourth and final installment in the House film series. Starring Terri Treas, Melissa Clayton, and Scott Burkholder, the film also featured William Katt reprising his role as Roger Cobb from the first movie. While it has connections to the original, it is a mostly-standalone sequel, with a plot centered around another home that encounters a haunting.

== Synopsis ==
Roger Cobb (William Katt) is now married to Kelly (Terri Treas), and has a daughter, Laurel (Melissa Clayton). He often visits the old Cobb family house after his father's death. It is located on a deserted and desolate shoreline. Roger's cynical step-brother Burke (Scott Burkholder) has been pestering him to sell the family mansion, edging Roger to break his oath with their father.

Roger is soon killed in a bad car accident that leaves Laurel requiring a wheelchair, leaving the house over to Kelly. Burke is still unable to convince Kelly to sell the house. Unknown to Kelly, Burke wants to sell the house so that a seedy Mafia group can use the property to dump illegal waste. The head of the Mafia has dwarfism and suffers intense phlegm, but proves to be very powerful and influential.

Various supernatural events start occurring in the house, and after Kelly consults with a Native American spiritual guide, she learns that it is the spirits of Roger and some Native Americans, trying to warn Kelly about the danger she is in.

== Cast ==
- Terri Treas as Kelly Cobb
- Scott Burkholder as Burke
- Denny Dillon as Verna Klump
- Melissa Clayton as Laurel Cobb
- Dabbs Greer as Mr. Cobb, Roger's Father
- Ned Romero as Ezra
- Ned Bellamy as Lee
- John Santucci as Charles
- Mark Gash as Mr. Gross
- Paul Keith as Plumber
- William Katt as Roger Cobb

== Reception ==
Andrew Pollard at Starburst called it a "a fitting way to bring the House franchise to a conclusion". AllMovie wrote, "this installment marks a slightly more effective return to the horror comedy formula that made the original a surprise hit".
