= Harry Manfredini =

American film composer and jazz soloist (born 1943)

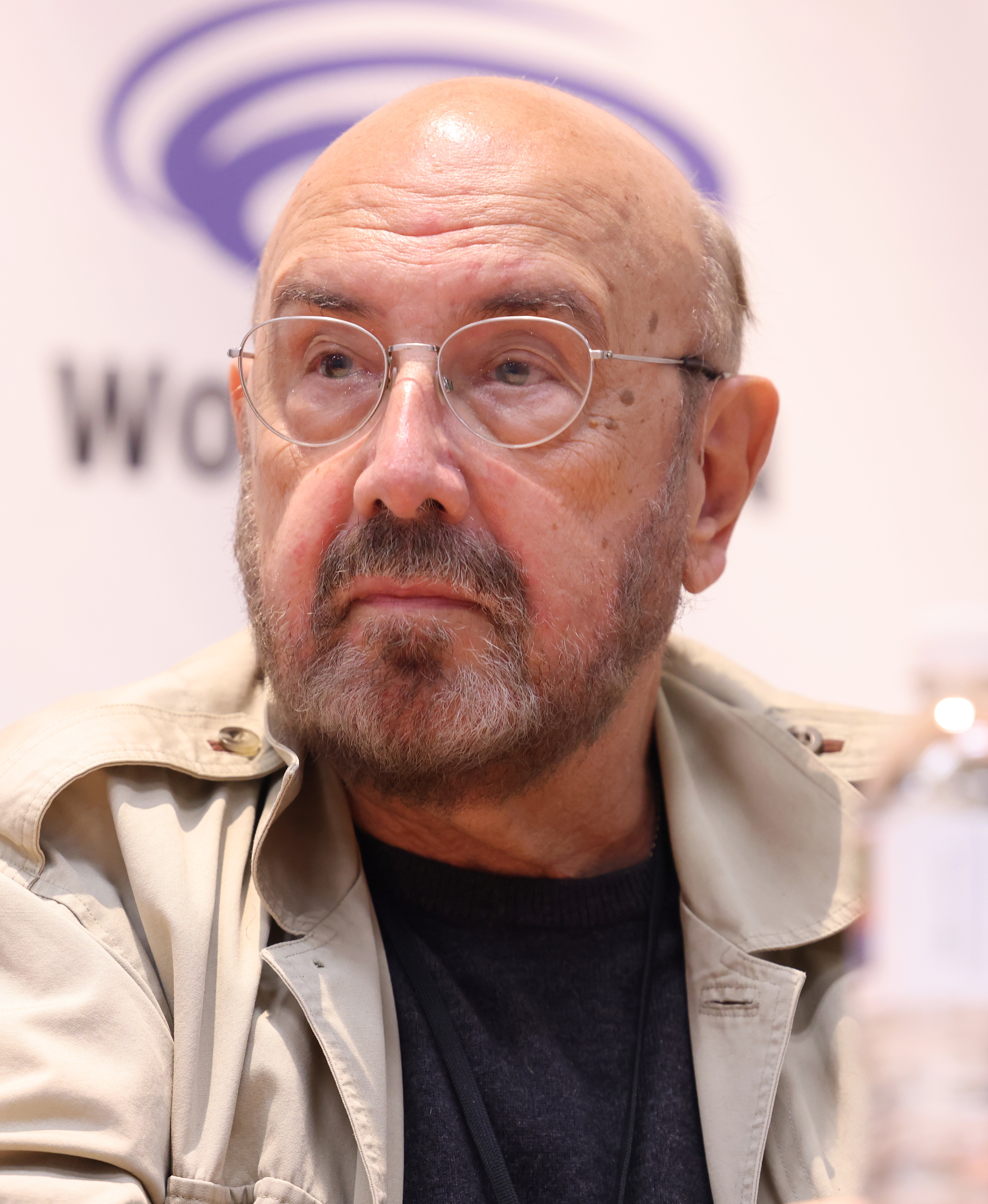
- Manfredini in 2025

Background information
- Born: August 25, 1943 (age 83); Chicago, Illinois, U.S.
- Instruments: Saxophone; synthesizer; accordion; percussion
- Years active: 1976–present

Harry Joseph Manfredini (born August 25, 1943) is an American composer, multi-instrumentalist, and jazz soloist. He has scored more than one hundred films, including most of the Friday the 13th series. He has had years of classical training, as well as twenty years in the popular music scene.

== Early life and education ==
Manfredini was born and raised in Chicago, the son of Italian American parents. As a child, Manfredini took accordion lessons and studied clarinet and saxophone before performing in a local rock band as a teenager.

He received a Bachelor of Music degree from DePaul University, a Master of Arts degree from Western Illinois University, and a doctorate from Columbia University.

== Career ==
Manfredini composed the scores for several films in the late 1970s, including Through the Looking Glass (1976), Here Come the Tigers (1978), and Manny's Orphans (also 1978).

Manfredini is known for composing the scores for Friday the 13th (1980) and most of its sequels: Friday the 13th Part 2 (1981), Friday the 13th Part III (1982), Friday the 13th: The Final Chapter (1984), Friday the 13th: A New Beginning (1985), Friday the 13th Part VI: Jason Lives (1986), Friday the 13th Part VII: The New Blood (1988) with composer Fred Mollin, Jason Goes to Hell: The Final Friday (1993), and Jason X (2001).

Manfredini also scored numerous other horror films, including The Children (1980), Swamp Thing (1982), House (1986), House II: The Second Story (1987), The Horror Show (1989), and House IV (1992).

In addition to film scores, Manfredini composed the music for the children's television adaptations Corduroy (1984) and A Pocket for Corduroy (1986).

In 2017, Manfredini provided the score to Friday the 13th: The Game, a video game based on the Friday the 13th franchise.

In February 2026, it was announced that Manfredini was involved in the scoring of the forthcoming Crystal Lake television series, a prequel to the original Friday the 13th (1980) produced by A24.

== Influences ==
In conversation with Russian journalist and composer Tony Vilgotsky, Manfredini said that his musical tastes and style were influenced by such composers as Giacomo Puccini, Igor Stravinsky, Maurice Ravel and others.

== Selected credits ==
=== Film ===
Year	Title	Notes	Ref.
1976	Through the Looking Glass		
1977	Three Dangerous Ladies		
1978	Here Come the Tigers		
1978	Manny's Orphans		
1979	Night Flowers		
1979	Danny		
1980	Friday the 13th		
1980	The Children		
1981	Friday the 13th Part 2		
1982	Swamp Thing		
1982	Friday the 13th Part III		
1983	Spring Break		
1984	Friday the 13th: The Final Chapter		
1985	The Hills Have Eyes Part II		
1985	Friday the 13th: A New Beginning		
1985	House		
1986	Friday the 13th Part VI: Jason Lives		
1986	Slaughter High		
1986	A Pocket for Corduroy	Television film	
1987	House II: The Second Story		
1988	Friday the 13th Part VII: The New Blood	Co-composed with Fred Mollin	
1988	Cameron's Closet		
1989	DeepStar Six		
1989	The Horror Show		
1989	Friday the 13th Part VIII: Jason Takes Manhattan	"Friday the 13th Jason Vocal Effects"; Main score composed by Fred Mollin	
1990	Angel of Death	Television film	
1992	House IV		
1992	Aces: Iron Eagle III		
1993	My Boyfriend's Back		
1993	Jason Goes to Hell: The Final Friday		
1993	Amore!		
1997	Wishmaster		
1999	The Omega Code		
1999	Follow Your Heart		
2001	Jason X		
2002	Terminal Invasion	Television film	
2002	Wolves of Wall Street		
2003	Freddy vs. Jason	"Friday the 13th Jason Vocal Effects" (from tracks in the film "Jason's Surprise Attack" and "Jason's First Dream" by Machine Head); Main score composed by Graeme Revell	
2007	The Anna Nicole Smith Story		
2008	House of Usher		
2009	Friday the 13th	"Jason Vocal EFX"; Main score composed by Steve Jablonsky	
2009	Mrs. Washington Goes to Smith	Television film	
2012	Snow White: A Deadly Summer	Direct-to-video film	
2013	A Talking Cat!?!		
2013	Crystal Lake Memories: The Complete History of Friday the 13th	Documentary film	
2016	Lake Eerie		
2018	A Chance in the World		
2019	Hanukkah		
2022	Doubting Tom		
2022	Headless Horseman		
2023	Midnight Bloodshed		
2023	Scream VI	"Friday the 13th Part VIII Vocal Effects"; Main score composed by Brian Tyler and Sven Faulconer	
2024	Mean Girls	"Friday the 13th Theme"; Main score composed by Jeff Richmond	
2024	Monster Mash		
2024	Solitude		
2025	Morgan: Killer Doll		

=== Television ===
Year	Title	Notes	Ref.
1984	Corduroy	Television short	
2026	Crystal Lake	Main Title theme and End Credits theme (season 1, episode 8 only); Main score composed by Giosuè Greco	

=== Video games ===
Year	Title	Notes	Ref.
2017	Friday the 13th: The Game		

=== Screen appearances ===
Year	Title	Role	Notes	Ref.
2009	His Name Was Jason: 30 Years of Friday the 13th	Himself	Documentary film	
2013	Crystal Lake Memories: The Complete History of Friday the 13th	Himself	Documentary film	
2026	Friday the 13th: Camp Crystal Legacy	Himself	Documentary web series; Episode: "Part I – The Cult of Crystal Lake"	

== Sources ==
- Craig, Rob (2019). American International Pictures: A Comprehensive Filmography. Jefferson, North Carolina: McFarland & Company. ISBN 978-1-476-66631-0.
- Grove, David (2005). Making Friday the 13th: The Legend of Camp Blood. Godalming, England: FAB Press. ISBN 978-1-903-25431-8.
