= False protagonist =

Literary technique

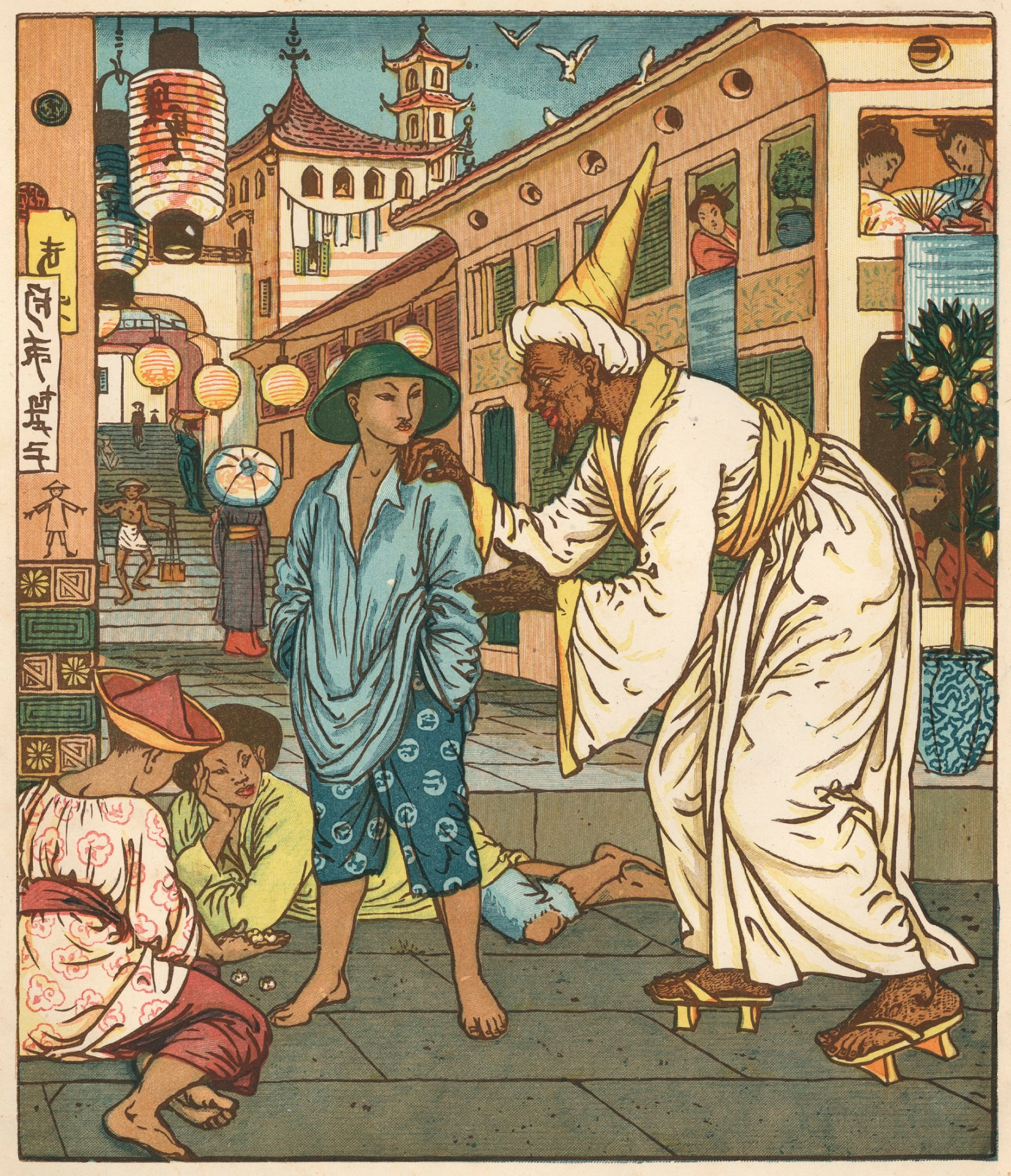
Aladdin and the sorcerer, in the story Aladdin. The story starts by following the sorcerer as he seeks a magic lamp, but Aladdin is later revealed as the story's protagonist.

In fiction, a false protagonist is a literary technique, often used to make the plot more jarring or more memorable by fooling the audience's preconceptions and constructing a character who they assume is the protagonist but is later revealed not to be.

A false protagonist is presented at the start of the fictional work as the main character, but then is eradicated, often by killing them, usually for shock value or as a plot twist, or changed in terms of their role in the story, such as by making them a lesser character, a character who leaves the story, or revealing them to actually be the antagonist.

== Overview ==
In film, a character can be made to seem like the protagonist through several techniques beyond focusing the plot on their role. Star power is one such method, as the audience generally assumes that the biggest "name" in a film will have a significant role. An abundance of close-ups can also be used as a subliminal method, as generally the star of a film will get longer-lasting and more frequent close-ups than other characters, but this is rarely immediately apparent to viewers watching the film. Alternatively, the false protagonist can serve as a narrator to the film, encouraging the audience to assume that they survive to tell their story later.

Many of the same techniques used in film can apply to television, but the episodic nature adds an additional possibility. By ending one or more episodes with the false protagonist still in place, the show can reinforce the viewers' belief in the character's protagonist status. As well, because TV shows often have changes in cast between seasons, some series can have unintentional false protagonists: characters who begin the series as the main character, but are replaced early on in the show's run by another character. When the series is viewed as a whole, this can lead to the appearance of a false protagonist.

In video games, a false protagonist may initially be a playable character, only to be killed or revealed to be the antagonist. One key way in which video games employ the method that differs from uses in non-interactive fiction is by granting the player direct control over the false protagonist. Since most video games allow a player to control only the main characters and their success or failure is based on playing skill, not a pre-determined story, the sudden demise of the character that is being controlled serves to surprise the player.

== Examples ==
=== Literature ===
- The Book of Samuel begins with Samuel's birth and God's call to him as a boy. At this point, readers are led to believe that Samuel is the central figure of the book. However, by the sixteenth chapter, the book begins to primarily focus on David.
- The story of Aladdin in the Arabian Nights begins with a wizard undertaking a quest from Morocco to China to recover a powerful magical lamp. Gradually, it becomes clear that the boy Aladdin, whom the Wizard meets in China, is the true protagonist, while the Wizard is the story's villain.
- Robert A. Heinlein's 1940 science fiction short story The Roads Must Roll begins with an orator inciting rebellion among the workers of the story's "roadtowns" by enumerating their grievances, gaining their and the reader's sympathy. However, the rebelling workers then callously cause mass death and injuries among commuters, and the true protagonist is revealed to be the director, who is working to suppress the rebellion. By the end, the original orator is depicted as a cowardly and contemptible villain.
- Juan Rulfo's novel Pedro Páramo initially features Juan Preciado, who is searching for his father as a final wish made to his dying mother, as the protagonist of the story. Halfway through the novel, Preciado unexpectedly dies in the abandoned town of Comala, with the latter half of the novel focusing on the life of Pedro Paramo, his rise to power, and how his ambition and ruthlessness leads to Comala's demise.
- George R. R. Martin's novel series A Song of Ice and Fire features chapters told from the point of view of various characters. Each novel begins with a prologue chapter in which the point-of-view character dies. The most prominent point-of-view character in the first novel, A Game of Thrones, is Ned Stark, who in combination with his heroic characteristics is thus generally assumed to be the series' protagonist until the final chapters of the novel, where he is unexpectedly executed.
  - In the television adaptation, Game of Thrones, Ned Stark is portrayed by Sean Bean, who received top billing among the cast for the first season. Following the character's execution in the episode "Baelor", the penultimate episode of the first season, he appears again only in flashbacks, portrayed by Sebastian Croft as a child and Robert Aramayo as a young man.

=== Comics ===
The webcomic Sleepless Domain introduces a team of five magical girl characters, initially presenting Tessa, the team leader, as the protagonist. In the second chapter, three of Tessa's teammates are killed in a battle with a powerful monster, and the fourth, Undine, is severely injured. Tessa sacrifices her powers to heal Undine, and the story shifts to focus on Undine as she struggles to cope with the loss of her friends. Tessa, now powerless, becomes a supporting character.

=== Film ===
- In Night of the Living Dead (1968), Barbra and her brother Johnny are introduced as the protagonists. Johnny is quickly killed by a ghoul a few minutes into the film, and although Barbra is present throughout the whole film, she spends much of it in a catatonic state, and the character, Ben, takes over as the lead protagonist.
- Psycho (1960) opens with Marion Crane as the main character. She is killed partway through the film, making the murder far more unexpected and shocking. Director Alfred Hitchcock felt that the opening scenes with Marion as the false protagonist were so important to the film that when it was released in theaters, he compelled theater owners to enforce a "no late admission" policy.
- In The Warriors (1979), Cleon begins as the central leader of the gang, but after they are wrongly accused of murdering Cyrus and Cleon is killed, Swan takes over as the primary protagonist.
- In Arachnophobia (1990), nature photographer Jerry Manley (Mark L. Taylor) is initially portrayed as the protagonist. Early on in the film, Manley is bitten and killed by a poisonous spider, and the focus shifts to Ross Jennings (Jeff Daniels).
- In Executive Decision (1996), Austin Travis, portrayed by Steven Seagal, is introduced as a major protagonist only to be killed at the end of the first act, leaving David Grant (Kurt Russell) as the film's true hero.
- In Sicario (2015), the story is told from the point of view of FBI agent Kate Macer, who is enlisted for a government task force overseen by CIA officer Matt Graver and the mysterious Alejandro Gillick to take down the leader of a Mexican drug cartel. Although most of the story is told from Kate's perspective, she is kept in the dark about the purpose of the task force as she comes to learn that she is merely an observer who has no agency in the events unfolding around her. In the final act of the film, it is revealed that it is Alejandro's story, and the perspective switches to follow him as he seeks revenge on the cartel leader who murdered his family.
- In the A Nightmare on Elm Street franchise, the character Tina Gray (Amanda Wyss) is hinted at first to be the protagonist but is killed by Freddy Krueger early in Wes Craven's A Nightmare on Elm Street (1984), and Nancy Thompson (Heather Langenkamp) becomes the final girl of the film. The same plot device was later used in the third sequel A Nightmare on Elm Street 4: The Dream Master (1988), where Krueger kills Kristen Parker (Tuesday Knight) and Alice Johnson (Lisa Wilcox) is established as the final girl. In Freddy's Dead: The Final Nightmare (1991), the initial viewpoint character John Doe (Shon Greenblatt) is killed by Krueger, establishing Maggie Burroughs (Lisa Zane) as the true protagonist of the film.
- Laurie Strode (Jamie Lee Curtis) is the false protagonist of Halloween: Resurrection (2002), being killed in the film's first act.
- In Mindhunters (2004), J.D. (Christian Slater) is one of the central characters in the film's opening, alongside Sara (Kathryn Morris). He is the first character to be killed, being killed early on in the film. Val Kilmer's character, Jack Harris, is ubiquitous at the beginning of the film as a leader, but disappears from the plot until the other characters learn that he was killed.
- In the Friday the 13th franchise, Alice Hardy (Adrienne King), final girl of Friday the 13th (1980), is killed early by Jason Voorhees in Friday the 13th Part 2 (1981), with Ginny Field (Amy Steel) becoming the final girl of the sequel.
- Mars Attacks! (1996) had several notable actors, including Jack Nicholson, Pierce Brosnan, and Michael J. Fox, who portrayed false protagonists, who either end up dying or being captured by aliens. The characters who survived were portrayed by actors who were less known at the time, such as Natalie Portman.
- In Scream (1996), Casey Becker (Drew Barrymore) is introduced as the main character in the opening scene of the film before she is killed by Ghostface. Sidney Prescott (Neve Campbell) is then introduced as the film's actual protagonist. Barrymore was originally attached to play Sidney, but decided to play Casey, suggesting to the producers that her character be killed because "You kind of always have this tension, but you kind of know that your hero is going to make it. And I thought 'What if I die?', and then it'll be like all bets are off, anybody could get killed in this movie and would take away that cliché safety net of 'the girl always gets away.'"
- In The Ring (2002), Samara Morgan (Daveigh Chase) is introduced as a tragic protagonist during flashbacks where viewers are meant to sympathize with her, only for the film's ending to reveal that she is a malevolent entity.
- In A Perfect Getaway (2009), a mild-mannered couple (portrayed by Steve Zahn and Milla Jovovich), who are the protagonists, discover that there are psychopaths stalking and murdering tourists in the Hawaiian islands. The ending reveals that they are the actual killers.
- The Hunt (2020) introduces a string of false protagonists beginning with Emma Roberts, and continuing through Justin Hartley and Ike Barinholtz, before revealing Betty Gilpin's character Crystal to be the true protagonist.
- In Backrooms (2026), the viewpoint character Clark (Chiwetel Ejiofor) is killed off by his monstrous doppelganger Captain Clark and his therapist Mary (Renate Reinsve) takes over as the final protagonist.

=== Television ===
- In the pilot episode of the series The Shield, detective Terry Crowley is introduced as a new member of the Strike Team, working alongside police captain David Aceveda to help build a case against the group and its leader Vic Mackey. In the final scene, Crowley is killed by Mackey and Shane Vendrell after discovering his plan to inform on them. Subsequent episodes throughout the series deal with the fallout of Crowley's death.
- The pilot episode of the series Oz follows Emerald City inmate Dino Ortolani, with the majority of the episode told from his perspective. At the end of the episode Ortolani is killed at the behest of Ryan O'Reily, a former rival whose attempted murder resulted in his sentence of life imprisonment without parole. His death plays an important role in the first season, with O'Reily using Ortolani's death as a way to take out competition and control the drug trade in Emerald City.
- Both The Last of Us television series and the video game on which it is based initially follow Sarah Miller - the daughter of Joel Miller - dealing with the outbreak of a mutated strain of the Cordyceps fungus, which transforms its hosts into zombie-like creatures. Sarah is shot and killed by a soldier who fires on her and Joel while attempting to flee for safety, and the narrative shifts focus to Joel's life in the post-apocalypse twenty years later.
- Based on the social-deduction video game of the same name, Among Us initially focuses on Green as the series' sympathetic, underdog protagonist, having been raised from humble means and with hopes of one day becoming a captain of their own ship by working as an unpaid intern on the Skeld. Half-way through the series, however, the miniseries shifts narrative focus onto Purple as the dominant voice-of-reason among the remaining crewmates and additionally highlights their troubled history with Red. Not only do the final two episodes reveal Green to be the alien imposter murdering the other crew members of the Skeld, but Purple and Red eventually reconcile their differences and work together in order to save the Skeld, presenting Purple as the true protagonist of the miniseries.

=== Video games ===
- In Castlevania: Symphony of the Night, the player takes control of Richter Belmont throughout the prologue, which retells the epilogue of Castlevania: Rondo of Blood and his fight and subsequent victory against Dracula. Following a five-year time skip, the story is told from the perspective of Alucard, Dracula's son. Richter subsequently appears as a non-playable character and as a boss.
  - In an alternate playthrough of the game, players control Richter for the majority of the game up until he fights Shaft.
- In Fire Emblem: Genealogy of the Holy War, the player plays as Sigurd for the first half of the game, but he and most of his allies are killed in a double cross. His son, Seliph, then becomes the protagonist and resolves the conflicts of the story, defeating and killing his father's killer along the way.
- In Metal Gear Solid 2: Sons of Liberty, the player initially plays as Solid Snake, protagonist of the original Metal Gear games. However, the majority of the game afterward follows Raiden, with Snake becoming a deuteragonist.
- In Fatal Frame, the player assumes the role of Mafuyu in the prologue, after which her sibling Miku becomes the protagonist.
- In Star Fox Adventures, players initially control Krystal before she is captured by Andross, after which Fox McCloud regains his position as protagonist.
- In the prologue of Silent Hill 4: The Room, Joseph Schreiber is portrayed as the protagonist before being killed by Walter Sullivan. After the prologue, the game follows Henry Townsend, who comes to live in Schreiber's apartment.
- In Kingdom Hearts II, Roxas is initially portrayed as the protagonist in the first few hours of gameplay, but ceases to exist after learning of his nature as Sora's Nobody and merging with him, with Sora resuming his role as protagonist. Roxas returns in several subsequent games, being the focus of Kingdom Hearts 358/2 Days. In Kingdom Hearts III, he is resurrected and becomes a supporting character.
- In The Godfather: The Game, players initially control a gangster working for the Corleone family, who saves his son from a fire before being killed by thugs. Afterwards, players take control of his son, who seeks revenge for his death.
- In Call of Duty 4: Modern Warfare, the player assumes the roles of alternating player characters: SAS operative Sgt. John MacTavish and U.S. Marine Paul Jackson during the game's first act. At the end of the first act, Jackson is killed in a nuclear explosion, after which MacTavish is the sole player character.
- In Final Fantasy XII, the player starts the game playing as the young soldier Reks; after he is killed, the player switches control to Vaan, his younger brother.
- In Xenoblade Chronicles, Dunban is portrayed as protagonist during the prologue. After Dunban's right arm is severely injured, leaving him unable to wield the Monado sword, Shulk becomes protagonist and the Monado's new wielder, with Dunban later joining as a party member.
- In Assassin's Creed III, the player character during the prologue is Haytham Kenway, who is later revealed to be a member of the Templar Order, the game's main antagonists. Following the revelation of Haytham's true allegiance, the perspective shifts to his son Connor, the protagonist, while Haytham assumes the role of main antagonist.
- In Pikmin 3, the player controls Charlie during the prologue, before going to Alph's point of view, who is revealed to be the true protagonist. However, Charlie joins the playable group later, alongside Brittany.
- In The Bureau: XCOM Declassified, the player initially controls William Carter, but it is eventually revealed that he is being controlled by the Ethereal Asaru. After Carter rejects him, Aasru has a choice to take control of three other characters in the final mission that determines the ending. Carter can be killed in the final mission as well.
- In Danganronpa V3: Killing Harmony, Kaede Akamatsu is initially portrayed as the protagonist of the game. However, she is killed at the end of chapter 1, and her role as protagonist is replaced by Shuichi Saihara.
- The indie game Melody of Moominvalley involves the disappearance of Moomintroll, after which his best friend Snufkin takes over as protagonist.
- In The Legend of Zelda: Echoes of Wisdom, the player initially controls Link, who rescues Princess Zelda from Ganon before being sucked into a rift. However, he frees Zelda from her crystal prison beforehand, allowing her to assume the role of protagonist as she sets out to save Hyrule.
- In Clair Obscur: Expedition 33, Gustave is initially presented as the narrative's protagonist before suddenly being killed at the end of the first Act. Immediately after, Verso is introduced and takes up Gustave's role as protagonist and party leader throughout the second Act. Although Verso remains the primary playable character and party leader for the remainder of the game, the conclusion of the second Act reveals Maelle to be the true central character around whom the entire story revolves. In the final moments of the story, a feud breaks out between Verso and Maelle, and the player is given the option to take the side of one character or the other, altering the conclusion based on their choice.

== See also ==
- Antihero
- False hero
- Plot twist
- Red herring (narrative)
