= Big Legend =

- Film Poster
- Directed by: Justin Lee
- Written by: Justin Lee
- Produced by: Shawn Nightingale; Marc Gold; Andrew Garrettson; Jamie Roberts
- Starring: Kevin Makely; Todd A. Robinson
- Cinematography: Adrian Pruett
- Edited by: Michael Tang
- Music by: Jared Forman
- Production company: Papa Octopus Productions
- Distributed by: Sony Pictures Home Entertainment
- Release dates: June 13, 2018 (Portland, OR)
- Running time: 89 minutes
- Country: United States
- Language: English

Big Legend is a 2018 independent monster horror film released in 2018 by Sony Pictures Home Entertainment. It follows an army veteran who returns to search the Pacific Northwest forest where his fiancée was taken by a legendary creature.

== Plot ==
Tyler Laird and his girlfriend Natalie embark on a camping trip, intended by Tyler as the setting for a marriage proposal. The couple share a romantic night together and fall asleep, before being awoken by a slow, deliberate knock coming from within the woods. As Tyler investigates the sound, Natalie is dragged into the forest by an unseen creature.

Twelve months later, Tyler is released from Cowlitz County Psych Ward and taken home by his mother. She returns his and Natalie's belongings recovered from the scene, including his camera. While reviewing the photos, he spots a huge shape in the background. With his mother's blessing, Tyler returns to the forest.

Armed with a hunting rifle and camping gear, Tyler searches and discovers signs in the forest claiming ownership by Xylon Incorporated and warning against trespassing. He also finds a massive footprint in the mud. Stopping at a creek to refill his bottle, Tyler finds his gear stolen. He rushes back to his truck and spends the night there, armed only with his rifle and revolver. In the early morning, a huge creature shoves a felled tree through his windows. The creature leaves when Tyler fires two shots from his revolver.

Another hunter, Eli, comes to investigate the noise. He offers Tyler a spot at his camp nearby, which Tyler accepts. At the camp, Tyler asks about Xylon Inc., but Eli says he's never seen any company employee on the land before.

Eli takes Tyler to a spot marked by the Chinook with special bone symbols. He tells Tyler of the Chinook legends about creatures in the area “not friendly to man” and reveals he is looking for what he calls “the Big Man”. Returning to Eli's camp, they find a tree has been uprooted and shoved into the fire pit.

Hearing a roar in the distance, the pair ventures past the Chinook symbols. Tyler falls into a small marsh-like clearing of smashed trees and decomposing carcasses. When Eli pulls him up, a boulder is thrown from the trees and breaks Eli's leg. Tyler fires off several shots and drags Eli to safety as it starts to snow. Leaving Eli with his revolver, Tyler returns to the feeding ground to retrieve his backpack. He finds Natalie's engagement ring in the dirt while collecting his gear, when the Beast appears. He runs from the area and back to Eli. Using his gear, he splints Eli's leg and together they escape the Beast's area, emerging on the other side near a river. They make camp, surrounded by four fire pits for protection, and take watch while trying to fish with a makeshift rod.

Several days pass, and Eli suggests Tyler leave him and save himself, but Tyler refuses. Eli sneaks off on his own when Tyler is asleep, using the rifle for support. When Tyler wakes, he follows Eli's trail, coming upon the broken rifle and the Beast feeding on Eli's corpse. The Beast sees him and claws Tyler's shoulder before he is able shoot it with his revolver, causing it to run off. He returns to camp and stitches himself up, before arming himself with his revolver and several makeshift weapons and making his way back to Eli's camp.

Tyler sets a trap at the camp and uses Eli's truck's horn to lure the Beast to the campground, then engages it in a fight. He shoots a propane tank and throws a lit flare into the fuel causing the tank to explode while the Beast is incapacitated next to it; the Beast runs into the forest, engulfed in flames.

Later, a man driving along a mountain highway sees an exhausted Tyler emerge from the trees and collapse on the road. Tyler wakes up in a hospital. A man introduces himself as Jackson Wells and tells Tyler that he believes his Bigfoot claims because he too, has "seen monsters". He is not convinced Tyler killed the beast, despite the extensive injuries he inflicted, and then tells Tyler he is part of a team and that he's recruiting, then the film ends.

== Cast ==
- Kevin Makely as Tyler Laird, a 12-year Army veteran
- Todd A. Robinson as Eli Verunde, a poacher hunting in the off season
- Summer Spiro as Natalie, Tyler's missing fiancé
- Amanda Wyss as Dr. Wheeler
- Lance Henriksen as Jackson Wells
- Adrienne Barbeau as Rita Laird
- Skotty Masgai as The Beast
- Ashley Platz as Nurse Katie

== Production ==
Big Legend writer/director Justin Lee grew up in the Pacific Northwest and drew inspiration for the film from local Bigfoot legends he heard while growing up. Shot in an area of Washington Lee was familiar with, nearly a week into filming, the state saw its biggest snow storm in 30 years, which covered the area overnight with as much as two feet of snow in some places. This meant the snow had to be incorporated into the film's script. Lee explained they achieved this by editing different shots of the snow levels in the area into the various parts of the film to build up to the high levels of snow the crew were left with after the storm.

Lee emphasized his desire to use practical effects in the film, but also to make "this one-man movie where he's on the hunt for this creature, similar to Predator". He cited Jaws as an inspiration for their approach to this film's Sasquatch, utilizing Spielberg's technique of not revealing the monster in full until the film's climax. Lee cast Kevin Makely due to his longtime friendship with the actor and said that Makely wanted the role due to his personal belief in Bigfoot. The role of Tyler's mother was initially not in scripted, but regarding the character and the casting of Adrienne Barbeau, Lee said: "we realized maybe we needed to have something that helped people relate to what Tyler was going through...so I knew I had to bring her in and thought [Barbeau] would be great in this role in particular, because of her performances on Carnivàle".

== Release ==
The film premiered at the 2018 Portland Horror Film Festival (which took place June 13–16) and screened at the Hollywood Theater in Portland, Oregon. It was released on DVD and VOD on July 3, 2018 by Sony Pictures Home Entertainment and reportedly made $41,839 in DVD sales.

== Reception ==
Critical reception for the film has been mixed. Rotten Tomatoes currently holds two reviews of the film, one "rotten" and one "fresh". Roger Moore from RogersMovieNation.com, argues the film has a few good scares and "stages good attacks and fights" but heavily criticizes the characters and plot, and also calls the film's set up for future installments "deluded", ultimately awarding it 1.5/4 stars. Chuck Foster from Film Threat and praises the film's performances, particularly Makely's and notes that despite the film's micro-budget, it still manages to pull off some excellent creature effects. The reviewer awards the film 8/10 stars and says "Big Legend isn’t here to change your mind about politics or make you feel some deep emotion. This is pure mindless entertainment of the highest drive-in quality".

Bloody Disgusting published a review of the film in 2018 coinciding with its release on DVD and VOD. The review is mostly positive calling the film "a surprisingly compelling survival story with more than a few surprises up its sleeve". The review makes note of Makely's performance and says that he carries the film. The major criticism is given to the "very mundane" looking Bigfoot and says that the film overall is lacking polish, but awarded it 3.5/5 skulls (stars).

Dread Central published a mixed review nearly a week after the film's release on DVD. The review praises the film's climax and the performances in the film but cites its slow pacing and lack of Bigfoot violence as the main detractors. The reviewer also notes that the film does an admirable job of building excitement for "a Dark Universe of his own using Mythical Monsters" and rates the film 2.5/5 stars.

== Sequel ==
The film's end credits begin with the following message: "Tyler Laird and Jackson Wells will return in The Monster Chronicles". Director/writer Justin Lee said the casting of Lance Henriksen was integral, calling him a "linchpin in our future plans for this world, and there was no one better than Lance Henriksen to play that character". He also mentioned that Amanda Wyss' character may also appear in The Monster Chronicles. In regards to the future of the series Lee said:

You will definitely see some of these faces more. There are multiple films planned as of right now, and we are planning out a lot more practical creature effects, too. There are some creatures I think that you've heard of, and there are some that you might not have heard of, but you will see different looks for what we’re planning. One of my favorite movies of all time is The Monster Squad, and I don't think we've had the same thing in a movie in a very long time where you've got monster hunters chasing down multiple monsters.
