= Tina Gray (A Nightmare on Elm Street) =

- A Nightmare on Elm Street character
- A production still of A Nightmare on Elm Street of Amanda Wyss filming the film's opening with Robert Englund as Freddy Krueger on the background.
- Created by: Wes Craven
- Portrayed by: Amanda Wyss (1984); Katie Cassidy and Julianna Damm (2010)

In-universe information
- Full name: Original series: Christina "Tina" Gray; Reimagined series: Christina "Kris" Fowles
- Occupation: High school student
- Status: Deceased

Christina "Tina" Gray (named Kristina "Kris" Fowles in the 2010 reboot) is a fictional character in the A Nightmare on Elm Street franchise. She was created by Wes Craven. The character was portrayed by Amanda Wyss in the original film and Katie Cassidy in the 2010 film. Julianna Damm also portrayed the character as a preadolescent in the 2010 film's flashbacks and dream sequences.

A high school student whose death is the catalyst for the events of the series, Gray is the false protagonist of the 1984 original film. She also appears in the novels, Wes Craven's New Nightmare (1994), Freddy vs. Jason (2003), 2010 reboot, merchandise based on the films, and a claymation version of the character is shown in the documentary Never Sleep Again: The Elm Street Legacy (2010). The imagery featuring Gray in the body bag during the dream sequences have been regarded as iconic.

== Appearances ==
Tina awakens from a terrifying nightmare in which a disfigured man wearing a blade-fixed glove attacks her in a boiler room. Her mother points out four mysterious slashes on her nightgown. The following morning, Tina's best friend Nancy Thompson and Nancy's boyfriend, Glen Lantz, console her, revealing that they each also had a nightmare the previous night. The two stay at Tina's house to be with her when Tina's mother goes out of town with a boyfriend, where Nancy also confesses to having a nightmare about the disfigured man. Tina's boyfriend, Rod Lane, interrupts their sleepover. Tina and Rod have sex. When Tina falls asleep, she dreams of the disfigured man chasing her. Rod is awakened by Tina's thrashing and sees her being dragged and fatally slashed by an unseen force, forcing him to flee as Nancy and Glen awaken to find Tina bloodied and dead.

Although Tina doesn't physically appear in A Nightmare on Elm Street 2: Freddy's Revenge (1985), she is referenced when Jesse Walsh and Lisa Webber discovered Nancy Thompson's diary and began to read some of the pages. Archive footage of Tina is shown in the meta-sequel Wes Craven's New Nightmare (1994).

In Freddy vs. Jason (2003), Tina appears during flashback scenes in Freddy's introduction. However, she was originally meant to have a larger role. In the original script written by Damian Shannon and Mark J. Swift, Tina appears in Lori Campbell's first nightmare of Freddy Krueger. Bloody, affixed to the ceiling, and still clothed in her blue nightshirt, Tina tells Lori the following: "Freddy is coming back. It's okay to be afraid, Lori. We were all afraid. Warn your friends... warn all your friends." However, this version of the script was scrapped and Tina was excluded from the final version of the film.

In the Bollywood slasher film Mahakaal, which is heavily inspired by A Nightmare on Elm Street, the character of Seema (Kunickaa Sadanand) is analogous to Tina Gray, with the same role and fate.

A claymation version of Tina appears in the documentary Never Sleep Again: The Elm Street Legacy (2010).

=== Kris Fowles ===
Katie Cassidy (left) and Julianna Damm (right) as older and younger versions of Kris Fowles respectively on the 2010 remake A Nightmare on Elm Street.

In the 2010 reboot, Tina is renamed Kristina "Kris" Fowles. Kris is shown going to the Springwood Diner to meet with her ex-boyfriend, Dean Russell, who falls asleep at the table and is murdered in his dream by Freddy although in the real world it appears that he is cutting his own throat. At Dean's funeral, Kris discovers a photograph of them as children, but doesn't have any memories of him before high school. Kris finds herself as the target of the disfigured man when she falls asleep and begins to do what she can to stay awake. Jesse Braun shows up at her house to keep her company while she sleeps, but Kris is murdered by Freddy in her dreams.

=== In literature ===
Tina appears in the novelization of the original A Nightmare on Elm Street.

=== In merchandise ===
Tina is included in NECA's "Ultimate Freddy Krueger". Her face, replicating one of the dream sequences from the film, appears as a side item featured in the package.

== Development ==
=== Conception ===
In Never Sleep Again: The Elm Street Legacy: The Making of Wes Craven's A Nightmare on Elm Street, Amanda Wyss noted the parallels between Tina and Marion Crane from Alfred Hitchcock's Psycho stating:

"The neat thing about my character, I thought, was that she appeared to be a little bit of a red herring. You almost think Tina's going to be the heroine at the beginning, in a way. It's a little bit of a nod to Hitchcock, I think. And I found that interesting and fun."

Parallels with Nancy and Tina have also been made for Kristen Parker acting as a false protagonist to Alice Johnson in the third sequel The Dream Master. When discussing the differences between Nancy and Tina, Wyss noted that she viewed Tina as a victim of a dysfunctional home life, saying:

"I think Tina was living in a home where her mom was drinking and there was just not that much value on life. She simply looked for ways to escape the life that she had. Whereas I think people pictured Nancy as the girl that got straight A's in school, and she did what was in front of her, and she did it well. But I don't think Tina was as much of a survivor. I just don't think she had the tools to fight the force of Freddy."

In Welcome to Our Nightmares: Behind the Scene with Today's Horror Actors by Jason Norman, Wyss described Tina as a very difficult character to portray stating, "Tina is a full and complex character and she was very challenging to play. I prepared for my role by really sinking into every detail about her in the script and just letting her come alive within me."

Robert Englund wrote a script called Freddy's Funhouse for a third film of the series (which ended up being A Nightmare on Elm Street 3: Dream Warriors) in which the main protagonist would have been Tina's older sister, who was in college at the time of Tina's murder, and who returns to Elm Street to investigate the circumstances of her sister's death after suffering a series of disturbing nightmares about it.

=== Casting ===
There were no separate auditions for the characters of Tina and Nancy; all actresses who auditioned for one of the two female roles read for the role of Nancy, and upon potentially being called back, were mixed with other actresses trying to find a pair that had chemistry. Wyss was sent the script for A Nightmare on Elm Street and brought in to read for Wes Craven. Subsequently, she was called back to read lines with Heather Langenkamp. Craven was impressed with the chemistry between the two and cast her as Tina and Langenkamp as Nancy Thompson.

== Reception ==
In The Encyclopedia of the Gothic, 2 Volume Set, William Hughes states that Tina is "the archetypical damsel in distress, who is set up as the main character in the film's opening sequence, only to be brutally murdered seventeen minutes in." In The Greatest Horror Movie Ever Made, Paul Counelis describes Gray as a sympathetic character stating, "There is another character in the film who brings about feelings of empathy, Tina Gray (a very game Amanda Wyss), and even though she is...disposed of early on, she is in a way both the emotional anchor of the movie for us because of how easily she is victimized and due to Nancy's affection for her..." Tommy Hutson stated, "Like Marion Crane's demise in Psycho, Tina's violent murder was a catalyst that propelled the other characters into action."
