= Mark Swift and Damian Shannon =

American screenwriters and film producers

Mark Swift and Damian Shannon are American screenwriters and film producers. They are known for their collaborative script-writing projects, which include Freddy vs. Jason and the 2009 Friday the 13th reboot. The pair also collaborated on the script for the 2026 horror thriller film Send Help, directed by Sam Raimi.

== Early life and education ==
Shannon attended Bishop McNamara High School and New York University. He then enrolled at the University of Southern California, where he met fellow student and later writing partner Mark Swift.

Swift graduated from The Benjamin School in Palm Beach County, Florida in 1988 before enrolling at the University of Southern California. He eventually graduated from Johns Hopkins University in Baltimore with a degree in International Relations.

== Career ==
Swift and Shannon wrote an adaptation of the comic book Danger Girl for New Line Cinema in 2000.

Swift and Shannon wrote a script for the film Friday the 13th, which was released in 2009. They also wrote a script for a sequel before that project was canceled. They had previously written the script for the 2003 film Freddy vs. Jason, after several previously written scripts had been rejected by the producers at New Line Cinema.

In 2011, Swift and Shannon were executive producers of the film Seconds Apart. In March 2012, they set up a high school-set horror film at Paramount Pictures, but the film never entered production.

In 2014, Swift and Shannon worked on an original, potential franchise starting horror project for New Line Cinema, and co-produced O'Lucky Day, a leprechaun-centered comedy for Paramount Pictures starring Peter Dinklage; neither project was filmed. In 2015, the pair worked together on a script for a live-action Aladdin prequel titled Genies, and in 2017, they wrote the script for the comedy Baywatch, an adaptation of the TV series.

In September 2025, they were announced to be scripting a remake of the film Magic (1978) for Lionsgate.

Some of their unreleased projects include Vikings for Disney, an adaptation of the Image comic Hawaiian Dick, Inland Saints for Paramount, and an adaptation of Howard Chaykin’s graphic novel Power & Glory.

== Filmography ==
Writers

- Freddy vs. Jason (2003)
- Friday the 13th (2009)
- Baywatch (2017)
- Send Help (2026)

Executive producers

- Seconds Apart (2011)
- I Heart Shakey (2012)

Documentary appearances

- His Name Was Jason: 30 Years of Friday the 13th (2009)
- Crystal Lake Memories: The Complete History of Friday the 13th (2013)
