= Badland (2019 film) =

2019 American Western film

- Directed by: Justin Lee
- Written by: Justin Lee
- Produced by: Kevin Makely
- Starring: Kevin Makely; Trace Adkins; Mira Sorvino
- Cinematography: Idan Menin
- Edited by: Michael Tang
- Music by: Jared Forman
- Production company: Papa Octopus Productions
- Release date: 28 September 2019
- Running time: 117 minutes
- Country: United States
- Language: English

Badland is a 2019 American Western film set more than a decade after the American Civil War. Written and directed by Justin Lee, it depicts a Pinkerton detective who has been sent west to find several former Confederate soldiers who committed atrocious acts during the Civil War.

== Plot ==
Pinkerton detective and Union Army veteran Matthias Breecher (Kevin Makely) is hired by one of the first African-American senators to track down the worst of the Confederate war criminals. He first shoots and kills former confederate General Corbin Dandridge (Trace Adkins), in the general's Mississippi barn.

Breecher then travels west, seeking his next target, Reginald Cooke (Bruce Dern). Along the way, he encounters bounty hunter Harlan Red (Wes Studi), who states that they will one day come into conflict. Breecher finds Cooke on his farm and learns that Reginald is being cared for by his daughter, Sarah (Mira Sorvino) as he is dying of pneumonia. Breecher decides to neither shoot nor hang Cooke, but to stay at his homestead until he passes away from the disease. During his stay, he becomes close to Sarah.

Breecher travels to see a neighboring landowner, Fred Quaid (James Russo). He offers Quaid money to stop threatening the Cookes get them to sell their land to him. Quaid offers to leave them alone if Breecher can beat Quaid's best man in a fist fight. Breecher accepts and wins the fight, then returns to the Cooke's homestead. The next day, however, Quaid and several men attack the Cooke homestead. Breecher and Sarah Cooke hold them off. Reginald steps outside with a gun to help, and is shot by Quaid, who is, in turn, shot by Breecher. After building a coffin for Reginald and helping Sarah bury him, Breecher heads west to New Mexico in search of former Confederate Captain Huxley Wainwright (Jeff Fahey).

Staying at a hotel and saloon, Breecher encounters now-Sheriff Wainwright after a gunfight inside the saloon. Wainright is suspicious of newcomers, since he stopped receiving letters from Dandridge, and has Breecher grabbed and tied to a chair early the next morning. Wainwright discovers that Breecher is a detective after seeing his badge and the warrants Breecher carries. He has Breecher waterboarded and knocked out, then instructs two of his men to bury him alive outside of town.

Breecher regains consciousness as Wainwright's men are digging his grave and makes his escape, killing both of them. He stumbles to the local church, where he finds saloon bartender Alice Hollenbeck (Amanda Wyss) praying, and gives her a message to wire to his patron, Senator Benjamin Burke (Tony Todd). She returns with Burke's response that Breecher should use his own discretion and proceed "by any means necessary".

After giving her a letter addressed to Sarah Cooke, Breecher instructs Alice to hide until the fighting is over and leaves the church. He marches to the saloon and engages in a gunfight with Wainwright's men, which he wins. Wainwright is drawn out, and challenges Breecher to a showdown in which they are both shot. Breecher survives his injury, gives Wainwright's sheriff's badge to Alice, and departs town, later collapsing in a grove.

Harlan Red finds him and bandages his wounds. In thanks, Breecher tells Red where to find Wainwright's body, to collect the bounty. Breecher continues on, eventually reaching the Cooke homestead, where he finds Sarah.

== Cast ==
- Kevin Makely as Matthias Breecher
- Mira Sorvino as Sarah Cooke
- Bruce Dern as Reginald Cooke
- Wes Studi as Harlan Red
- Trace Adkins as General Corbin Dandridge
- James Russo as Fred Quaid
- Jeff Fahey as Huxley Wainwright
- Amanda Wyss as Alice Hollenbeck
- Tony Todd as Senator Benjamin Burke

== Production ==
Filming took place on location in Santa Clarita, California, at the Veluzat movie ranch. Lee had watched the 2017 revisionist Western Hostiles and felt inspired, but also began reminiscing about films he watched with his grandparents, and was inspired "to write something as a throwback to those types of movies, but not make something 'corny' in a way, something with heavy drama, but still maintaining those old traditions and tropes of the '60s and '70s".

== Reception ==
On the review aggregator website Rotten Tomatoes, 57% of 7 critics' reviews are positive, with an average rating of 5.4/10. Metacritic, which uses a weighted average, assigned the film a score of 46 out of 100, based on 4 critics, indicating "mixed or average" reviews. Joe Leydon in Variety said, "Justin Lee's indie Western should satisfy genre enthusiasts with a strong cast and an entertaining spin on a familiar story."
