= Freddy vs. Jason (score) =

Freddy vs. Jason: Original Motion Picture Score

Film score by Graeme Revell
- Released: August 19, 2003
- Genre: Film score
- Length: 42:29
- Label: Varèse Sarabande
- Producers: Graeme Revell, Robert Townson (executive)

Graeme Revell soundtrack chronology
Daredevil (2003)	Freddy vs. Jason: Original Motion Picture Score (2003)	Out of Time (2003)

Professional ratings
Review scores
Source	Rating
Allmusic	2.5/5 stars

Freddy vs. Jason: Original Motion Picture Score is the score album to the 2003 film Freddy vs. Jason. It was released on August 19, 2003, by Varèse Sarabande. The album was composed by Graeme Revell and performed by the City of Prague Philharmonic Orchestra, while three tracks were performed by Machine Head.

== Track listing ==
=== Original version ===
All tracks are written by Graeme Revell.

Freddy vs. Jason - Original Motion Picture Score (Original version)
No.	Title	Length
1.	"The Legends"	2:39
2.	"The House of Elm Street"	1:07
3.	"Girl With No Eyes"	3:08
4.	"The Psych Ward"	0:41
5.	"Gibb Meets Freddy"	3:00
6.	"Will's Story"	2:33
7.	"French Kiss"	1:57
8.	"The Control Room"	1:49
9.	"Jason's Surprise Attack" (Includes Jason's Theme from Friday the 13th composed by Harry Manfredini; performed by Machine Head)	2:57
10.	"Jason's First Dream" (Includes Jason's Theme from Friday the 13th composed by Harry Manfredini; performed by Machine Head)	1:01
11.	"Stoner Creature"	0:57
12.	"Freddy's Dream World"	1:10
13.	"Jason Unmasked"	3:49
14.	"In the Library"	2:42
15.	"Freddy Gets Young Jason"	3:30
16.	"Wake Up Lori"	1:49
17.	"Freddy in the Real World" (performed by Machine Head)	1:00
18.	"Fight on the Dock"	2:35
19.	"Freddy Expires"	2:37
20.	"Is It Ever Over?"	1:28

While as noted, all tracks performed by the City of Prague Philharmonic Orchestra.

=== Re-release ===
Varèse Sarabande re-released the score on October 16, 2015 as part of 8-CD box set A Nightmare on Elm Street with a different number of tracks and a total length.

Freddy vs. Jason - Original Motion Picture Score (Re-release version)
No.	Title	Length
1.	"Nightmare Theme/Boiler Room/Freddy Recap"	4:13
2.	"Make Em Remember"	1:22
3.	"Outside the Window"	0:35
4.	"Lights Out"	0:37
5.	"Open Back Door"	1:05
6.	"Gibbs Shower, Trey Gets Killed"	1:08
7.	"Police Station"	1:13
8.	"Girl with No Eyes"	3:07
9.	"Blake Meets Freddy"	1:19
10.	"Dad Loses Head"	0:15
11.	"Psych Ward at Night"	0:40
12.	"Orange Juice"	0:57
13.	"Lori Passes Out"	0:24
14.	"Mark Hassles Lori"	0:40
15.	"Got Your Nose"	0:52
16.	"Run from School"	0:13
17.	"Library/Will and Mark in Van"	2:41
18.	"Gibb in the Cornfield/Into the Silo"	1:40
19.	"Gibb Meets Freddy"	1:14
20.	"Jason Sees Raver"	1:25
21.	"Pig to Fuck"	1:36
22.	"I Was There Lori"	2:33
23.	"Bathtub/Mark Dies"	3:09
24.	"You Understand"	0:26
25.	"French Kiss"	1:46
26.	"Security Control Room"	1:46
27.	"Stoner Bug"	0:54
28.	"Destroying Hypnocil"	0:56
29.	"Attack in Control Room"	2:48
30.	"Jason’s First Dream"	0:56
31.	"Dream Fight Part A"	0:34
32.	"Dream Fight Part B"	0:31
33.	"Jason’s Weakness"	1:10
34.	"Jason Unmasked"	3:47
35.	"Freddy Gets Young Jason"	3:27
36.	"Wake Up Lori"	1:47
37.	"Jason Goes After Freddy"	0:57
38.	"Linderman Dies"	0:42
39.	"Man the Torpedoes"	2:41
40.	"The Dock"	2:33
41.	"Freddy Dies/Finale"	3:44

== Personnel ==
- Paul Broucek – Executive in Charge of Music
- Mark Curry – Mixing Engineer
- Juraj Durovic – Engineer
- Boris Elkis – Programming
- Lindsay J. Harrington – Coordination
- Dominic Hauser – Orchestration
- Dora Hiller – Vocals
- Mario Klemens – Conductor
- Gregg Nestor – Music Preparation
- Melissa Osser – Vocals
- Josef Pokluda – Contractor
- Ashley Revell – Editing
- Graeme Revell – Producer
- Robert Revell – Guitar, Soloist
- Mitch Rotter – Executive
- David Russo – Programming
- Erin Scully – Executive
- Tim Simmonec – Orchestration
- Melanie Spore – Vocals
- Robert Townson – Executive Producer

== See also ==
- Freddy vs. Jason (album)
