= Amanda Wyss =

American film and television actress

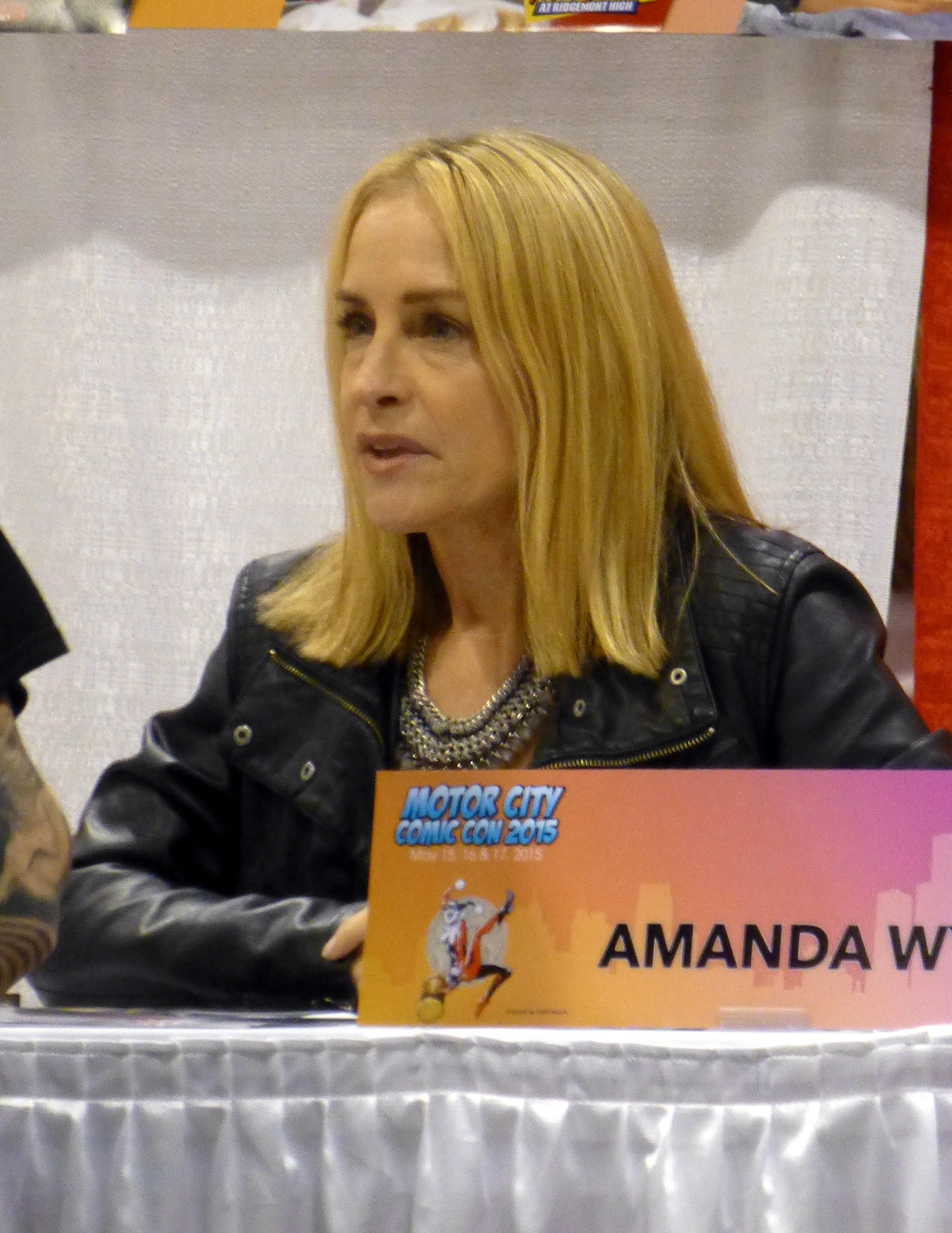
- Wyss in 2015
- Occupation: Actress
- Years active: 1980–present
- Known for: Fast Times at Ridgemont High; A Nightmare on Elm Street; Better Off Dead; Silverado; Highlander: The Series
- Spouse: Stephen Caffrey (m. 2024)

Amanda Wyss is an American actress. She began her career in the early 1980s in teen roles including Lisa in the coming-of-age comedy film Fast Times at Ridgemont High (1982), Tina Gray in the slasher film A Nightmare on Elm Street (1984), and Beth in the film Better Off Dead (1985). She had a supporting role as investigative reporter Randi McFarland in the television series Highlander: The Series (1992–1993). She played Woody's ex-girlfriend, Beth, in two episodes of Cheers in the mid-1980s.

== Career ==
After appearing in commercials, Wyss landed her first television role, recurring on Universal's When the Whistle Blows (1980) as Dolph Sweet's daughter. The same year, she guest-starred on the television series The Righteous Apples. In 1981, Wyss starred in the films This House Possessed and Force: Five, and guest-starred on episodes of the several television series, including Buck Rogers in the 25th Century, ABC Afterschool Specials, Jessica Novak, and Teachers Only.

In 1982, Wyss had a supporting role as high-school student Lisa in Amy Heckerling's teen comedy classic Fast Times at Ridgemont High, written by Cameron Crowe and featuring then-unknown actors Sean Penn, Phoebe Cates, Forest Whitaker, Jennifer Jason Leigh, and Nicolas Cage.

The same year, she guest-starred on two episodes of the television series Star of the Family. In 1983, Wyss appeared in the television films Lone Star, The Tom Swift and Linda Craig Mystery Hour, and A Killer in the Family.

Wyss later starred with Loni Anderson in the television film My Mother's Secret Life (1984). Wyss had her breakthrough role as victim Tina Gray (the first on-screen kill of iconic villain Freddy Krueger) in Wes Craven's horror film A Nightmare on Elm Street (1984), along with Robert Englund, Heather Langenkamp, John Saxon, and Johnny Depp. Film critic Paul Attanasio praised the “slick performances” of the younger cast in a review for The Washington Post, writing of Wyss: "Wyss is a teenage Hitchcock blond, a Little League Janet Leigh."

The following year, Wyss guest-starred in the television series Otherworld before starring in the films Silverado as Phoebe and Better Off Dead as Beth, who sank the main character into his depression by breaking up with him. From 1985 to 1986, Wyss guest-starred on St. Elsewhere as Pru Dowler and Cheers as Beth Curtis. In 1986, Wyss starred in the television films Firefighter and Something in Common. The same year, she starred in Flag. In 1987, Wyss was cast in the television film Independence and the television series The New Adventures of Beans Baxter, My Two Dads, and Cagney & Lacey. In 1989, Wyss starred in the horror film To Die For as Celia Kett. The same year, she portrayed Rabbit Layton in Powwow Highway.

In 1990, Wyss appeared in the cult horror film, Shakma (1990). In 1991, Wyss reprised her role as Celia in Son of Darkness: To Die For II and starred alongside Mark Hamill in Black Magic Woman. The following year, Wyss starred in season one of the fantasy television series Highlander: The Series (1992) as a reporter named Randi McFarland. In 1997, Wyss was cast as Michelle Harding in Strategic Command. In 1999, Wyss guest-starred as Stevie on the television series Charmed. The following year, Wyss was cast in the short film Bella! Bella! Bella! as Charlotte Breceda. In 2001, Wyss guest-starred on the crime series CSI: Crime Scene Investigation. In 2002, she appeared in an episode each of Judging Amy and Drew Carey Show. In 2004, Wyss portrayed Sonya Witkowski in an episode of the television series Cold Case. In 2006, Wyss guest-starred as a social worker in the television series Dexter.

She was a special guest of the Crypticon 2010. The same year, Wyss appeared in The Graves (2010). In 2014, Wyss portrayed Joanna Cass in an episode of Major Crimes. In 2016, Amanda starred in the horror film The Id. The same year, Wyss had a recurring role as Kat Cooper in three episodes of the television series Murder in the First.

== Personal life ==
Wyss married actor Stephen Caffrey on November 2, 2024.

== Filmography ==
=== Film ===
Year	Title	Role	Notes
1981	First Step	Cindy Stott	
1981	Force: Five	Cindy Lester	
1981	This House Possessed	Holly	
1982	Fast Times at Ridgemont High	Lisa	
1984	My Mother's Secret Life	Tobi Jensen	
1984	A Nightmare on Elm Street	Tina Gray	
1985	Silverado	Phoebe	
1985	Better Off Dead	Beth Truss	
1989	Powwow Highway	Rabbit Layton	
1989	To Die For	Celia Kett	
1990	Shakma	Tracy	
1991	Son of Darkness: To Die For II	Celia	
1991	Black Magic Woman	Diane	
1992	Bloodfist IV: Die Trying	Shannon	
1994	Wes Craven's New Nightmare	Tina Gray	Archive footage, uncredited
1994	Desert Steel	Jerri	
1995	Digital Man	Lt. Fredericks	
1997	Strategic Command	Michelle Harding	
1997	Tupperware Party	Maddie	Short
1998	Marry Me or Die	Nora Dawkins	
2000	Bella! Bella! Bella!	Charlotte Breceda	Short
2003	Freddy vs. Jason	Tina Gray	Archive footage, special thanks
2005	Monster-in-Law	Tina Gray	Archive footage, uncredited
2010	Never Sleep Again: The Elm Street Legacy	Herself	Documentary
2010	Deadly Impact	Julie Mulligan	
2010	The Graves	Darlene	
2011	These Amazing Shadows	Lisa	Scenes from Fast Times at Ridgemont High (1982), uncredited
2016	The Id	Meridith Lane	
2017	It Happened Again Last Night	Eileen	Short, cameo
2017	The Watcher of Park Ave	Lt. Samantha Warren	Short
2017	Big Legend	Dr. Wheeler	
2019	Triggered	Gloria Fielding	
2019	Badland	Alice Hollenbeck	

=== Television ===
Year	Title	Role	Notes
1980	When the Whistle Blows	Cindy	
1981	Buck Rogers in the 25th Century	Laura	Episode: "The Crystals"
1982	Cass Malloy	Colleen Malloy	1 episode (pilot for She's the Sheriff)
1984	Cagney & Lacey	Brigit Cagney	Episode: "Extradition"
1985	Otherworld	Nova	Episode 1: Rules Of Attraction
1985	St. Elsewhere	Pru Dowler	Episode: "Lost and Found in Space"
1985–1986	Cheers	Beth Curtis	2 episodes
1987	My Two Dads	Dana	Episode: "Friends and Lovers"
1991	Quantum Leap	Suzanne	Episode: "The Leap Back"
1992	Gunsmoke: To the Last Man	Lizzie Tewksbury	TV movie
1992–1993	Highlander: The Series	Randi McFarland	7 episodes
1995	Murder, She Wrote	Laura Maples	Episode: “Another Killing in Cork”
1996	NYPD Blue	Ellen Lewis	Episode: “Sorry, Wong Suspect”
1999	Charmed	Stevie	Episode: "Witch Trial"
2001–2011	CSI: Crime Scene Investigation	Donna Marks/Tina Vincent	4 episodes
2001	Diagnosis: Murder	Maureen	Episode: "Bachelor Fathers"
2002	Judging Amy	Denise Wharton	Episode: "Come Back Soon"
2002	The Drew Carey Show	Tina	Episode: "Return of the Doormat"
2004	Cold Case	Sonya Witkowski	Episode: “Disco Inferno”
2006	Dexter	Social Worker	Episode: "Popping Cherry"
2014	Major Crimes	Joanna Cass	Episode: "Jane Doe #38"
2016	Murder in the First	Kat Cooper	3 episodes
2019	All Rise	Caroline Halliwell	Episode: "Fool for Liv"
2022	The Rookie	Meredith Russell	Episode: "Coding"
