= Camp Fern =

Summer camp in Harrison County, Texas, US

- Location: Marshall, Texas
- Created: 1934
- Operator: Camp Fern Legacy, Inc.
- Website: www.campfern.org

Camp Fern is a summer camp for boys and girls, located in rural Harrison County outside of Marshall, Texas, United States. It was founded in 1934, and operates on the basis of Christian principles, with respect for all faiths.

== History ==
Though they had facilitated recreational activities for children on the shores of Fern Lake since 1931, Vernon and Maggie Hilliard officially founded Camp Fern in 1934 with the addition of residential cabins built from logs sourced from the surrounding area. A five-week, all-girls session began each summer, followed by a five-week, all-boys session.

The original activities offered, including English horseback riding, swimming, canoeing, riflery, archery, arts & crafts and educational programs on the natural ecosystem of the Piney Woods of East Texas, all remain. Through the years, more have been added - including water skiing, tennis, boxing, fencing, drama and a ropes course. Additionally, Camp Fern seeks to provide unique cultural experiences - such as the 2015 visit from the Bolshoi Ballet from Moscow, Russia.

Since the beginning, a focal point of camp life at Fern has been tribal competition - in which all campers join one of two tribes (Bena or Owaisso at girls' camp, Caddo or Tejas at boys' camp) that are pitted against each other in a variety of contests throughout the session. On the last night of camp, the result of the session-long competition is announced by revealing that year's "feather" - painted in the winning tribe's color - on a wooden plaque that resembles a Native American headdress.

In 1985, Camp Fern reduced the length of the all-girls and all-boys sessions to four weeks apiece, and added a two-week co-ed session for younger children. The shorter, co-ed session was discontinued after 2019.

In 2008, the remake of Friday the 13th was partially filmed at Fern.

In August 2022, it was announced that Camp Fern Legacy, a non-profit entity led by a board of directors, would take over operation of Camp Fern beginning with the Summer 2023 season.

== Notable alumni ==
- Kay Bailey Hutchison, former United States Senator from Texas
- Chandra North, model
