= To Die For (1989 film) =

1989 film by Deran Sarafian

- Theatrical release poster
- Directed by: Deran Sarafian
- Written by: Leslie King
- Produced by: Lee Caplin; Barin Kumar
- Starring: Brendan Hughes; Duane Jones; Philip Granger; Julie Maddalena; Amanda Wyss
- Cinematography: Jacques Haitkin
- Edited by: Dennis Dolan
- Music by: Cliff Eidelman
- Distributed by: Skouras Pictures
- Release date: May 16, 1989
- Running time: 94 minutes
- Country: United States
- Language: English
- Budget: $1 million

To Die For (also known as Dracula: The Love Story) is a 1989 American independent romantic horror film directed by Deran Sarafian and starring Brendan Hughes as vampire Vlad Tepes, Duane Jones (in his final film role), Philip Granger, Julie Maddalena and Amanda Wyss.

== Plot ==
Vlad Tepes, the Prince of Darkness, resurfaces in Los Angeles with a new look, new life and new love. But with the new life comes an old nemesis who has waited an eternity to settle the score.

== Cast ==
- Brendan Hughes as Vlad Tepes
- Sydney Walsh as Kate Wooten
- Amanda Wyss as Celia Kett
- Scott Jacoby as Martin Planting
- Micah Grant as Mike Dunn
- Duane Jones as Simon Little
- Steve Bond as Tom

== Production ==
Producer Greg H. Sims wanted to produce a Dracula film that emphasized the romantic aspects of the character as he personally felt prior incarnations had not adequately tapped into that side of the character. Sims had considered titling the film Dracula: The Love Story, but ultimately decided to go with To Die For as downplaying the Dracula connections would help increase the film's commercial chances. Sims cast Brendan Hughes as Vlad Tepes having previously worked with him on Return to Horror High as Sims thought Hughes had all the qualities he wanted to see in his interpretation of Dracula. The film's special effects were supervised by John Carl Buechler.

== Release ==
The film was given a limited release theatrically in the United States by Skouras Pictures in 1989.

The film was released on VHS by Academy Entertainment in the late 1980s. The film was released on DVD in the United States under the title Bram Stoker's To Die For by Triumph Marketing in 2005. This version is currently out of print.

== Sequel ==
The film was followed by the sequel Son of Darkness: To Die For II in 1991. Scott Jacoby and Steve Bond return to portray their roles as Martin and Tom, respectively. The character of Vlad was performed by Michael Praed for the sequel. Rosalind Allen was brought on to star, a role she later stated she took for the acting experience. The movie was filmed during 1990 in Lake Arrowhead, California with the cast and crew often needing to deal with freezing temperatures as well as filming late at night as the sound stage they were filming on wasn't soundproofed against traffic.

The sequel's plot centers around a mother, Nina, whose adoptive son Tyler has begun acting strange. She turns to Vlad, who is working as Dr. Max Schreck, for assistance. Recognizing that the child needs blood to survive, Vlad decides to tutor the child and begin a new age of vampires.

Michael Weldon called this a "pretty boring sequel", noting that there was a story in the New York Post that claimed the film influenced a man to attack his girlfriend and try to suck her blood.
