= The Id (film) =

- The official poster
- Directed by: Thommy Hutson
- Written by: Sean H. Stewart
- Produced by: Thommy Hutson; Daniel Farrands
- Starring: Amanda Wyss; Patrick Peduto; Jamye Grant
- Edited by: Marc Cardenas
- Music by: Sean Schafer Hennessy
- Production companies: Hutson Ranch Media; Panic Ventures
- Release date: February 18, 2016 (Hollywood Reel)
- Running time: 87 minutes
- Country: United States
- Language: English
- Box office: $7,857

The Id is a 2016 American thriller/horror film, written by Sean H. Stewart and directed by Thommy Hutson. The film stars Amanda Wyss, Patrick Peduto and Jamye Grant. As of February 2019, the film has grossed nearly $8k from DVD and Blu-ray sales.

== Plot ==
A lonely woman caring for her domineering father is pushed to the brink when a figure from her past re-enters her life.

== Cast ==
- Amanda Wyss as Meridith Lane
- Patrick Peduto as Father
- Jamye Grant as Tricia
- Malcolm Mathews as Ted
- Karen Leabo as Dana
- Brent Witt as Fantasy Ted and Officer McDaniel
- Stefanie Guarino as Officer Lopez
- Erin Astin as Young Meridith
- Ryan Bouton as Young Ted

== Reception ==
The Id received favorable reviews, with much of the praise going towards the performance of Wyss, the direction, and writing. However, there is criticism towards the editing and score. Writing for Starburst magazine, James Evans wrote that Wyss gives a "complex performance that anchors the film." Evans also highlighted the writing of Stewart and the direction of Hutson but was critical of the editing for becoming what he believed to be repetitive.

Mark L. Miller of the website Ain't It Cool News had similar praise for Wyss, stating her emotional performance "is what makes this film worth seeking out." In a review for Blu-ray, Dr. Stephen Larson criticized the editing by Marc Cardenas and narrative limitations set up by Hutson and Stewart. Larson describes the film as an "average horror feature."

Winner of Best Thriller at the 2016 Hollywood Reel Independent Film Festival.
