= Friday the 13th (2009 film) =

Film by Marcus Nispel

- Theatrical release poster
- Directed by: Marcus Nispel
- Screenplay by: Damian Shannon; Mark Swift
- Story by: Damian Shannon; Mark Swift; Mark Wheaton
- Based on: Characters by Victor Miller
- Produced by: Sean S. Cunningham; Michael Bay; Andrew Form; Brad Fuller
- Starring: Jared Padalecki; Danielle Panabaker; Aaron Yoo; Amanda Righetti; Travis Van Winkle; Derek Mears
- Cinematography: Daniel C. Pearl
- Edited by: Ken Blackwell
- Music by: Steve Jablonsky
- Production companies: New Line Cinema; Paramount Pictures; Platinum Dunes; Crystal Lake Entertainment
- Distributed by: Warner Bros. Pictures (United States and Canada); Paramount Pictures (International)
- Release dates: February 9, 2009 (Mann's Chinese Theater); February 13, 2009 (United States)
- Running time: 97 minutes
- Country: United States
- Language: English
- Budget: $19 million
- Box office: $92.7 million

Friday the 13th is a 2009 American slasher film serving as a reboot and the twelfth installment overall in the Friday the 13th franchise. It was directed by Marcus Nispel from a screenplay by Damian Shannon and Mark Swift, the film stars Jared Padalecki, Danielle Panabaker, Aaron Yoo, Amanda Righetti, Travis Van Winkle, and Derek Mears. The story follows Clay Miller (Padalecki) as he searches for his missing sister, Whitney (Righetti), who is captured by Jason Voorhees (Mears) while camping in woodland at Crystal Lake.

The film was originally conceived as an origin story, but the project evolved into a reboot of the franchise where elements of the first four Friday the 13th films were used as inspiration for the story and characters. Voorhees was redesigned as a lean, quick killer with a backstory that allows the viewer to feel sympathy for him but not enough that he would lose his menace. In keeping with the tone of the film, Jason's mask was recreated from a mold of the original mask used for Friday the 13th Part III (1982) with minor changes. The film includes some of Harry Manfredini's musical score from the previous Friday the 13th films because the producers recognized its iconic status.

Friday the 13th was theatrically released in the United States on February 13, 2009. It received negative reviews, but was a box-office success, grossing $92.7 million at the box office on a budget of $19 million, becoming the second-highest-grossing film in the franchise after Freddy vs. Jason (2003).

== Plot ==
On Friday, June 13, 1980, a young Jason Voorhees watches as his mother Pamela is beheaded by Alice Hardy, who was trying to escape Mrs. Voorhees's murder spree around Camp Crystal Lake. 28 years later, five friends—Wade, Richie, his girlfriend Amanda, Mike, and his girlfriend Whitney—arrive for a camping trip at Crystal Lake, where they hope to find a crop of cannabis growing in the woods. That night, an adult Jason kills everyone except Whitney, whom he captures as she resembles his mother at a young age.

Six weeks later, Trent, his girlfriend Jenna, and friends Chelsea, Bree, Chewie, Nolan, and Lawrence arrive at Trent's summer cabin on the shore of Crystal Lake. Meanwhile, Whitney's brother Clay Miller arrives at the lake to search for her, despite his local sheriff's pleas to look elsewhere. Clay visits Trent's cabin, and Jenna agrees to help him search for Whitney. Chelsea and Nolan go wakeboarding on the lake where Jason kills Nolan with an arrow and Chelsea with his machete. Meanwhile, Clay and Jenna search the old Crystal Lake campgrounds, where they eventually see Jason hauling a body into an abandoned camp house.

Jenna and Clay runs back to the cabin to warn the others about Jason, Whitney escapes from Jason's dungeon and runs to the cabin. Chewie is killed by Jason in a tool shed near the cabin, while Trent and Bree have sex in a bedroom and Jason recaptures Whitney. Jenna and Clay arrive, and Clay calls the police. Jason then disconnects the cabin's electricity. Lawrence heads outside to search for Chewie, and Jason kills him with an axe. Jason then sneaks inside and kills Bree. A police officer arrives and knocks on the front door, but is killed by Jason before he can enter. Trent, Clay, and Jenna escape the cabin and become separated, but Trent is killed by Jason when he reaches the main road.

Jason chases Clay and Jenna back to the campgrounds, where Clay discovers Jason's underground lair and finds his sister, who's still alive but chained to a wall. Clay frees Whitney, and all three try to escape as Jason arrives. They find an exit, but Jenna is impaled by Jason's machete just before she can escape. Jason then corners Clay and Whitney inside of a barn, where Whitney confuses Jason by pretending to be Pamela. Clay and Whitney subdue Jason with a chain, and Whitney stabs Jason in the chest with his own machete. After sunrise, Clay and Whitney dump Jason's body into the lake, but before they can leave, Jason bursts through the wooden dock and grabs Whitney.

== Cast ==
- Jared Padalecki as Clay Miller
- Danielle Panabaker as Jenna Montgomery
- Amanda Righetti as Whitney Miller
- Travis Van Winkle as Trent DeMarco
- Aaron Yoo as Chewie
- Derek Mears as Jason Voorhees
  - Caleb Guss as Young Jason Voorhees
- Jonathan Sadowski as Wade
- Julianna Guill as Bree Turner
- Ben Feldman as Richie
- Arlen Escarpeta as Lawrence
- Ryan Hansen as Nolan Hamilton
- Willa Ford as Chelsea Sanders
- Nick Mennell as Mike Reynolds
- America Olivo as Amanda
- Kyle Davis as Donnie
- Richard Burgi as Sheriff Bracke
- Nana Visitor as Pamela Voorhees
  - Kathleen Garrett as voice of Pamela Voorhees

== Production ==
=== Development ===
The film was produced by New Line Cinema, Paramount Pictures, Platinum Dunes, and Crystal Lake Entertainment. New Line Cinema's Toby Emmerich approached Platinum Dunes producers Michael Bay, Brad Fuller and Andrew Form about remaking Friday the 13th in the same way they restarted The Texas Chainsaw Massacre franchise. They agreed and spent over a year obtaining the film rights from Paramount Pictures, New Line Cinema, and Crystal Lake Entertainment—the latter run by Friday the 13th creator Sean S. Cunningham. Paramount executives gave Platinum Dunes producers a license to use anything from the original films, including the title. Paramount was given the rights to distribute the film internationally and New Line Cinema retained U.S. distribution rights. Fuller and Form said they did not want to make Friday the 13th Part 11 or 12, but wanted to rework the mythology. They liked elements from the first four films—such as plot points and ways particular characters are killed—and planned to use these in their remake, which they did with Paramount's approval. Fuller said, "I think there are moments we want to address, like how does the hockey mask happen. It'll happen differently in our movie than in the third one. Where is Jason from, why do these killings happen, and what is Crystal Lake?" The producers initially expressed an interest in using Tommy Jarvis, a recurring character who first appeared in Friday the 13th: The Final Chapter (1984), but the idea was scrapped.

Though the producers decided that Friday the 13th would not be an origin story, they said that they wanted to work out a logical origin story for Jason that would provide a sense of history as the film progressed. Form and Fuller explained that the audience gets to see how Jason attains his famous hockey mask, and is given a reason for why he puts it on. Jason would transition from wearing a bag over his head—similar to the one seen in Friday the 13th Part 2 (1981)—to finding and wearing his hockey mask, whereas in Friday the 13th Part III (1982) he obtains the mask off-screen and comes out of a barn already wearing it.

Unlike both horror remakes, The Texas Chainsaw Massacre (2003) and The Amityville Horror (2005)—which were also produced by Bay, Form, and Fuller—it was decided that Friday the 13th would not be a period piece. Form and Fuller said the film was not strictly a remake so there was no reason they could not set the story in the 2000s. In October 2007, Mark Swift and Damian Shannon, the writers of Freddy vs. Jason (2003), were hired to write a script for Friday the 13th. Jonathan Liebesman was in negotiations to direct the film, but scheduling conflicts meant he was unavailable and Fuller and Form chose Marcus Nispel. Nispel was apprehensive about taking the job, mainly because he would be taking over another film franchise, but Fuller eventually persuaded him to direct the project. Principal photography began on April 21, 2008, in Austin, Texas and ended on June 13, 2008. Additional scenes were shot on location at Camp Fern near Marshall, Texas.

=== Casting ===
Stuntman Derek Mears was hired to portray Jason Voorhees at the recommendation of special make-up effects supervisor Scott Stoddard. Before the producers contacted him, Mears had already heard about the production of a new Friday the 13th and had decided to start physical training so he could pursue the role. He was unaware that Stoddard and other industry professionals were suggesting him to the producers. The studio worried that Mears' pleasant demeanor might affect his ability to portray a menacing character, but Mears assured them he was suitable for the role. According to Mears, "They were like, 'You're really nice ... are you going to be able to switch over, right?' I was like, 'I cage fight... and I've got a lot of dad issues. So yeah.'" Mears said he related to "Jason the victim" when he was growing up, and he wanted to portray Jason as a victim in the film. To Mears, Jason represents people who were bullied in high school—specifically those with physical deformities—for being outcasts. Jason is unusual because he exacts his revenge on those trying to take over his territory at Crystal Lake.

When Mears went to audition for the role, he was asked, "Why do we need an actor as opposed to just a guy in a mask?" Mears said portraying Jason is similar to Greek Mask Work, in which the mask and the actor are separate entities, and depending on the scene, there will be various combinations of mask and actor in the performance. Mears said the energy from the actor's thoughts will be picked up by the camera. He compared his experience behind the camera to a stock car race: he is the driver and the effects team is his pit crew. As he performs, the effects team subtly suggest ways he can give the character more life on camera.

Amanda Righetti had not read the script when she was offered the role of Whitney Miller. She wanted to be part of the Friday the 13th franchise from the start. Righetti said she wanted to act in the film to be a part of the franchise and was convinced by the script. Jared Padalecki describes Clay Miller as a real hero because he sets out "to do the right thing" when his sister goes missing, and goes about it as a "lone wolf" who wants to take on the responsibility alone. Adjustments were made to the filming schedule to accommodate Aaron Yoo, who portrays Chewie. Yoo had his appendix removed shortly before filming began, and could not film his scenes immediately. As soon as Yoo was ready for filming, Nispel immediately hung him upside down from some rafters, exposing the staples over his surgical wound for the character's post-death shot.

Fuller and Form said the casting process for Friday the 13th was more difficult than that for The Texas Chainsaw Massacre because thirteen young actors were involved in Friday the 13th, as opposed to five in The Texas Chainsaw Massacre. The pair continually recast roles to find which actors worked best together. This recasting process lasted until the start of filming. Hostel: Part II's Richard Burgi, who was cast as Sheriff Bracke, did not sign his contract until twelve hours before he was due to start filming his scenes.

=== Writing ===
When Shannon and Swift began writing the script for Friday the 13th, they imposed some rules based on their experiences of writing Freddy vs. Jason on themselves. They wanted their teenage characters to "sound normal". Shannon and Swift said they did not want the characters to know Jason's name or to become what they considered "the Scooby-Doo cliché where it's a bunch of kids trying to figure something out". The writers also wanted to distance themselves from self-referential slasher films such as Scream and to give the film a gritty, more 1980s feel that had been lost in recent films. They wanted to create a quick, loose Jason. The writing team decided to create a version of Jason "who was actually in the woods surviving off the land", and whose killings are presented as a way of defending his territory rather than randomly murdering whoever came along.

We felt it was important to go back to the basics and put Jason back in the woods again.

— Mark Swift on conceptualizing a new Friday the 13th film.

The writers did not want to spend a lot of time covering Jason's childhood experiences, which they felt would remove the sense of mystery from the character. They tried to write scenes that would add verisimilitude, like the audience finding a deer carcass lying on the ground as they follow Jason through his tunnels. Fuller told the writers they would have to do without it because it would cost $100,000. Because of budget constraints, certain character deaths and the ending of the film were also scaled back from what Shannon and Swift originally envisioned.

The writers had written a scene in which Willa Ford's character Chelsea is stranded on the lake for hours after she sees Jason standing on the shore. Eventually, the girl would tire and drown. Shannon and Swift felt this was something they had not seen in slasher films, but later decided to make the death quicker and more visceral. A similar incident occurred with Danielle Panabaker's character Jenna. Panabaker said Jenna was scripted to survive longer than she did in the final version of the film, where Jenna was supposed to escape Jason's lair and recite a "cute line" about a second date with Clay before an elaborate fight sequence that ends in her death. The writers wanted to strike a balance between finding new and interesting ways to kill characters and paying homage to popular death scenes that appeared in installments of the previous series. To accomplish this, Shannon and Swift included the presence of a wheelchair and a sweater in Jason's tunnels, because the character Mark (Tom McBride) was a paraplegic who was killed by Jason in Friday the 13th Part 2 and Mrs. Voorhees wore the sweater in the original version of Friday the 13th.

The writers altered Jason's character. Mears describes him as a combination of John Rambo, Tarzan, and the Abominable Snowman from Looney Tunes. To Mears, Jason is similar to Rambo because the audience sees him setting up the other characters to fall into his traps. Like Rambo, he is calculating because he feels he has been wronged and he is fighting back; he is supposed to be more sympathetic in this film. However, Fuller and Form said they learned from their experience with The Texas Chainsaw Massacre: The Beginning not to make Jason too sympathetic to the audience. They decided against an origin story because they did not want to focus on Jason's tormented childhood because the producers felt that would "demystify" the character in an unhelpful manner. Fuller said, "We do not want him to be sympathetic. Jason is not a comedic character, he is not sympathetic. He's a killing machine. Plain and simple."

=== Visual effects ===
The producers used Asylum Visual Effects to create digital effects for Friday the 13th. Although director Marcus Nispel is a proponent of practical effects, Asylum had to digitally create some shots to protect the actors and to allow the director to achieve a specific look. Visual effects supervisor Mitchell Drain assigned ten crew members to work on the visual effects; they first analyzed the script in pre-production to decide which shots would need digital effects. Asylum worked on 25 shots for the film.

Mears being filmed performing the killing of Ben Feldman's character. Asylum digitally created the rest of the machete to show it being pulled away from Feldman's face.

One of the first scenes Asylum was given the scene depicting the death of Amanda, in which Jason ties her into her sleeping bag and hangs her over a campfire. The risk to the actor and the surrounding woodland was deemed too great to physically perform the scene. Asylum created a composite of two shots to show Amanda burning to death in her sleeping bag. Instead of creating a computer generated (CGI) model of the campfire, a real campfire was filmed. Asylum compositor John Stewart blended that footage with shots of the hanging sleeping bag into a single shot. Stewart digitally altered the flames to keep continuity between frames. Another composite shot is used in the scene in which Chelsea is hit by a speedboat. Because the scene would be too dangerous for even a stuntperson to perform, Asylum digitally combined footage of Willa Ford reacting to an imaginary boat that runs over her with shots of the actual boat to create the effect.

Asylum also enhanced some of Jason's signature machete kills. In several scenes, the company used a computer-generated machete because Nispel wanted to show multiple characters' deaths in one shot instead of cutting from the acts of murder to the aftermath of their deaths. In one scene, Jason kills Richie by slamming a machete into his head. Instead of using a real machete with a fake head, Nispel had Feldman act dead as Mears pulled a handle—with only a portion of the blade attached—away from Feldman's head. Then, Asylum digitally created the rest of the machete blade to complete the effect. For this scene, Asylum adjusted the actor's facial expressions to create a "post mortem" look. The special effects team digitally drooped half of the actor's face to appear as though the nerves had been severed by Jason's machete.

Asylum digitally created weapons for various scenes. In the scene in which Nolan is killed suddenly by a shot in the head from Jason's arrow, Asylum created the arrow in post-production. Another scene involved Jason hurling a hatchet at Lawrence as he runs away, striking him in the back. The shot of a hatchet flying through the air—in one instance appearing in the same frame as the actor—would be too difficult to achieve practically. Asylum rendered a complete 3D model of the hatchet then inserted the model into the frames leading up to the frame in which it hits the character in the back. One of the final images added by Asylum was for Trent's death scene. Here, Asylum digitally created a metal spike that bursts through Trent's chest as Jason slams him onto the back of a tow truck.

=== Creating Jason ===
A bust of Jason as seen in the film. Effects artist Scott Stoddard combined characteristics from Jason's appearance in Friday the 13th Part 2 and The Final Chapter when crafting his design.

Effects artist Scott Stoddard described his look for Jason's face as a combination of Carl Fullerton's design for Friday the 13th Part 2 and Tom Savini's design for Friday the 13th: The Final Chapter. Stoddard's vision of Jason included hair loss, skin rashes, and the traditional deformities in his face. Stoddard tried to craft Jason's look so it would allow more human side of the character to be seen. Mears was required to wear full body make-up from the chest upwards while performing as Jason. The actor wore a chest plate with fake skin that would adjust to his muscle movements. He wore a hump on his back to give the impression that Jason had scoliosis. A prosthetic eye was glued to Mears' face to show realistic eye movements. Stoddard initially spent three-and-a-half hours applying the make-up to Mears' head and torso. He was eventually able to reduce the required time to just over an hour for scenes in which Mears wore the hockey mask. For scenes in which Jason's face is revealed, it took approximately four hours to apply the make-up.

For Jason's wardrobe, Mears was given a pair of combat boots and a "high-priced t-shirt" that allowed the special effects make-up to be seen through holes in the shirt. The jacket Jason wears in the film was created by combining a hunting jacket and a military jacket. Mears wanted to use the hunting jacket, but the creative team liked the way the military jacket billowed as he was making his "kill movements", so the top of the hunting jacket was removed and placed over the top of the military jacket to create what Mears called a "giant Frankenstein jacket." He describes Jason as leaner in this film because the character does not eat much. A leaner Jason was deemed more functional and allowed more emphasis to be placed on the hump on his back. Stoddard was inspired by the third and fourth films when designing Jason's hockey mask. Using an original mold, Stoddard made six new versions of the mask. He said, "Because I didn't want to take something that already existed. There were things I thought were great, but there were things I wanted to change a bit. Make it custom, but keep all the fundamental designs. Especially the markings on the forehead and cheeks. Age them down a bit. Break them up."

== Music ==
Form and Fuller recognized the iconic status of the music used in the first four Friday the 13th films. For their 2009 film, they immediately had the studio attain the licensing rights to the music, which was composed and originally performed by Harry Manfredini. They did not plan to use the score in its entirety, but they had Steve Jablonsky compose a score that was reminiscent of Manfredini's and created the atmosphere for the 2009 film. Nispel contacted Jablonsky to score Friday the 13th after having worked with him on the remake of The Texas Chainsaw Massacre. Nispel told Jablonsky he wanted him to create something that Nispel could "whistle when [he] left the theater", but was subtle enough that it would not immediately register while watching the film. Nispel said, "I don't believe that, when you watch a Friday the 13th film, you want to feel like John Williams is sitting next to you with the London Symphony Orchestra". Friday the 13th: Music From The Motion Picture was released on February 13, 2009, by New Line Records. Friday the 13th: Expanded Score From The Motion Picture was released on June 11, 2009.

== Release ==
=== Theatrical ===
A teaser trailer of the film debuted at the 2008 Scream Awards held in October and was later released online. In December, the film's theatrical poster and trailer was released. On Friday, February 13, 2009, Friday the 13th was released in 3,105 theaters in North America. It was theatrically released by Warner Bros. Pictures and New Line Cinema in the United States and Canada, and by Paramount Pictures in remaining worldwide territories. The 2009 film was given the widest release of any Friday the 13th film, including the crossover film with A Nightmare on Elm Street. It was released in nearly three times as many theaters as the original 1980 film and exceeded Freddy vs. Jason by 91 theaters. Friday the 13th was also released in 2,100 theaters in 28 markets outside North America.

=== Home media ===
The film was released on DVD, Blu-ray, and Apple TV on June 16, 2009. The DVD and Blu-ray releases contain the theatrical release and an extended cut of the film. It grossed $11.3 million in home sales. The film was re-released on September 13, 2013, for Friday the 13th: The Complete Collection, a box set featuring all twelve films in the franchise, then again on October 13, 2020, for Shout! Factory's "Special Edition" collection. Arrow Video released a limited edition 4K Blu-ray on September 24, 2024, that featured 4K remasters for both the theatrical and extended cuts.

== Reception ==
=== Box office ===
On its opening day, Friday the 13th grossed $19,293,446, and immediately exceeded the individual box office grosses for The New Blood (1988), Jason Takes Manhattan (1989), Jason Goes to Hell (1993), and Jason X (2002), which earned $19,170,001, $14,343,976, $15,935,068, and $13,121,555, respectively. From February 14–16, Friday the 13th earned an additional $24,292,003, making its four-day President's Day weekend total $43,585,449. By the end of its three-day opening weekend, it was already the second highest-grossing film in the franchise, having earned $40,570,365, slightly exceeding The Grudge (2004) for the best 3-day weekend opening of any horror film. When comparing the 2009 film's opening weekend to that of its 1980 counterpart in adjusted 2009 US dollars, the original Friday the 13th film earned $17,251,975. Although the 2009 film made more money, when factoring in the number of theaters each film was released in, the 1980 film earned an average of $15,683 per theater, compared to the 2009 film's average of $13,066.

Friday the 13th saw a significant drop in attendance in its second weekend at the box office. On its second Friday, the film earned $2,802,977—a decrease of 85.5% from its opening Friday. By the end of its second weekend, the film had earned $7,942,472—a decrease of 80.4% from the previous weekend. As a result, the film went from first place to sixth in the weekend box office chart. By its third weekend, Friday the 13th had left the top ten, earning $3,689,156—a 53.6% decrease from its second weekend. By the end of its box office run, Friday the 13th earned an estimated $65 million at the United States box office, but failed to regain a top ten spot after its third weekend.

As of July 2014, the 2009 film is the fifth-highest earning President's Day weekend with $45,033,454. It is the eighth-highest grossing weekend in the month of February, and the eighth- highest-grossing weekend for the winter season—the period from the first day after the New Year weekend until the first Thursday of March. Friday the 13th finished as the fourth-highest-grossing film of any February with $59.8 million, just behind Taken with $84.3 million, He's Just Not That Into You with $77.2 million, and Madea Goes to Jail, with $60.9 million.

Friday the 13th was the fifteenth-highest grossing R-rated film of 2009. Because of the significant decrease in box office revenues in its second weekend, the film had the sixth-largest second-weekend drop. It is the seventh-largest drop for a film that opened as the top-earning film in the United States. With its $65 million revenue at the North American box office, Friday the 13th is the highest-grossing film among slasher film remakes from the 2000s, which comprise When a Stranger Calls (2006), Black Christmas (2006), Halloween (2007), Prom Night (2008), and My Bloody Valentine 3D (2009). The film is ranked seventh-highest earning of all horror remakes, and is the seventh-highest earning slasher film in unadjusted dollars.

In addition to its North American box office gross, Friday the 13th earned over $9.5 million in foreign markets on its opening weekend. The film's biggest markets were the United Kingdom, Russia, Italy, Spain, and Germany. Friday the 13th took in approximately $1.7 million in both the United Kingdom and Russia, an estimated $1.1 million in Spain, and $1 million in both Italy and Germany. According to Paramount, this was the largest opening outside North America of any of the Friday the 13th films. The film finished its North American box office run with $65,002,019; coupled with its earnings of $27,688,218 outside North America, the film has accumulated $92,670,237 worldwide. The film earned $10,344,904 in domestic video sales.

=== Critical response ===
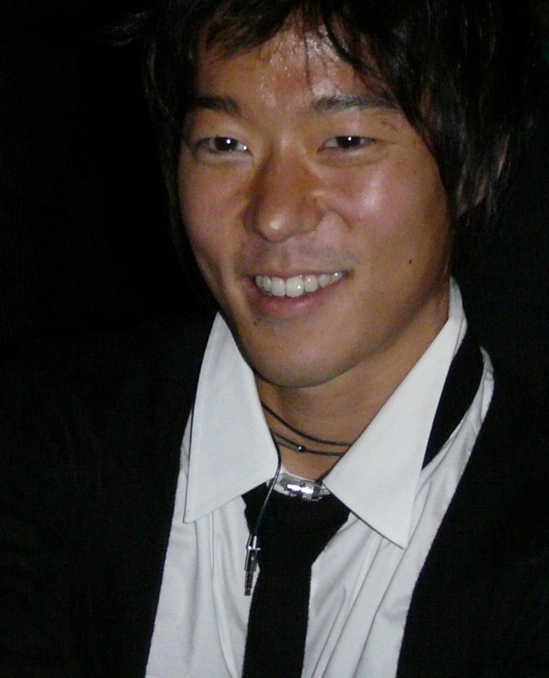
The comic relief of Aaron Yoo's performance as the cannabis enthusiast Chewie was praised by some critics

On the review aggregator website Rotten Tomatoes, 27% of 183 critics' reviews are positive, with an average rating of 4.3/10. The website's consensus reads: "Though technically well-constructed, Friday the 13th is a series rehash that features little to distinguish it from its predecessors." Metacritic, which uses a weighted average, assigned the film a score of 34 out of 100, based on 29 critics, indicating "generally unfavorable" reviews. CinemaScore polls reported that average grade cinemagoers gave the film a "B−" on a scale of A+ to F. Exit polls showed that 51% of the audience was male and 59% were at least 25 years old.

Alonso Duralde wrote that the film should please slasher fans, but that it added nothing new to the genre or the franchise and would not appeal to people who did not like slasher films. He also said the prospect of another Friday the 13th—crafted by the film's "sequel-friendly" ending—did not leave him with a feeling of dread. Bill Goodykoontz of The Arizona Republic said the film accepts the "ridiculousness" of what it is trying to accomplish—mainly the "death and dismemberment" of "party-hungry kids", and that audiences would enjoy it if they also recognized that. Although Goodykoontz acknowledges the unique touches the film brings to certain characters' deaths, he was unimpressed with the acting and said Padalecki's presence gave the film a "less-good episode of Supernatural" vibe.

The Washington Post's Dan Zak wrote that the film fails to provide laughs, scares, suspense, or gore. Zak also said it fails to provide the exhibition of nudity expected of horror films that cannot deliver on the previously listed criteria. Mark Olsen of the Los Angeles Times said Nispel captured the despair he created with his Texas Chainsaw Massacre remake. Olsen also said the film failed to provide the "giddiness", "teenage lust", and "rambunctiousness" that made the previous Friday the 13th films work. Wesley Morris said Friday the 13th did have humor; he said the characters continually act the clichéd role of would-be-victim, making it hard to fear for their safety. In his opinion, the 2009 film lacked the "psycho-social" aspect—a mother killing out of revenge for her son's death—crafted by its 1980 predecessor, and ultimately the film is "more hilarious than terrifying".

USA Today's Claudia Puig said that the film keeps to the same formula as its predecessors, with a story that adds little to nothing to the franchise. She also said Padalecki and Panabaker filled their lead roles well, and that Aaron Yoo's comic relief made him one of the most likable characters on screen. Rob Nelson of Variety also praised Panabaker and Yoo's performances.

In contrast to the film's detractors, The New York Times's Nathan Lee said Friday the 13th managed to "reboot the concept" of the original films with style. Lee said the film takes pleasure in killing off each of its characters, that there is a desire among cinemagoers for this type of material, and that Friday the 13th satisfies that desire. Adam Graham from The Detroit News said that it is the most effective and scary film in the Friday the 13th franchise, praising its choice of allowing Jason to run after his victims—as opposed to slowly walking behind them, as became prominent in later sequels—because it made him more menacing. Graham also said the film does not "soften" Jason's scariness by providing a sympathetic backstory. Roger Ebert of the Chicago Sun-Times explained his review of the film, he stated: "It will come as little surprise that Jason still lives in the woods around Crystal Lake and is still sore about the death of his mom. Jason must be sore in general". Entertainment Weekly's Clark Collis said director Nispel made a competent film that performs better as a whole than the previously released remakes of Prom Night (2008) and My Bloody Valentine 3D (2009), although it does provide a few too many unbelievable character moments.

Jason Anderson of the Toronto Star said the film added freshness to the standard formula of the previous films by focusing on the chasing and killing aspects instead of lingering on the prolonged suffering of victims like the Saw films. IGN's Chris Carle said Aaron Yoo stole the film with his comic timing and with his "memorable death". Carle said Derek Mears' portrayal of Jason adds more to the character than being simply a stuntman; Mears's subtle movements, athleticism, and physicality created an imposing image of Jason.

== Future ==
In October 2009, Warner Bros. Pictures set a release date for a sequel to Friday the 13th as August 13, 2010. On December 10, 2009, however, the sequel was pulled from its release date and was delayed indefinitely. In April 2010, producer Brad Fuller announced that a sequel to the film was not happening. In February 2011, Fuller announced that Damian Shannon and Mark Swift had finished a script for the sequel. In June 2013, Warner Bros. relinquished their film rights to the Friday the 13th franchise to Paramount. During the same month, however, Derek Mears (who portrayed Jason Voorhees in the 2009 film) revealed that Paramount was working with Platinum Dunes to produce a sequel to the remake. However, the sequel was later developed into a separate installment of the franchise. The rights to the franchise reverted to New Line/Warners in 2018.

In January 2023, writer Jeff Locker said that he, alongside Jeremy Weiss and Sean S. Cunningham, pitched a new Friday the 13th reboot, while also having a plan for an alternate direct sequel to the original film.

In May 2024, Cunningham explained that a new Friday the 13th film would not be released for at least three years due to movie studios being hesitant to fund a horror movie that may not be a financial success.

In July 2025, Robbie Barsamian revealed a new film and video game are in the works.

In February 2026, when asked about the sequel's plot, writers Mark Swift and Damian Shannon have said that the title would've been Friday the 13th: Camp Blood – The Death of Jason Voorhees and would take place in a winter season. They also confirmed that Whitney was killed by Jason and her body would've been seen in the frozen Crystal Lake during the opening sequence.

In March 2026, Sean S. Cunningham stated in an interview with TMZ that a treatment for an "old school" Friday the 13th film had been completed. He also indicated that he and franchise co-creator Victor Miller had resolved their dispute, and suggested that a potential merger between Warner Bros. and Paramount Pictures could provide significant momentum by addressing the longstanding rights issues that had hindered the project.

In November 2026, it was announced that a new film titled Jason, which will be directed by Steve Miner, written by David Fliegel, produced by Horror, Inc. and Catchlight Studios and distributed by Cineverse.

== Video game ==
In December 2019, Hishijin company released a pachinko machine Friday the 13th based on the film.
