= Kevin Makely =

American actor

Kevin Makely (born August 29, 1973) is an American actor and producer.

== Early life and education ==
Makely is a 1992 graduate of Roy C. Ketcham High School in Wappingers Falls, New York.

== Career ==
In 2019 Makely produced and starred in Justin Lee’s Badland as a Pinkerton detective tracking down Confederate soldiers with things to hide, in a cast that included Academy Award winner Mira Sorvino and multiple nominee Bruce Dern. Badland had success, after a small cinema release in November 2019, on streaming platform Netflix spending time in their top 10 most watched, peaking at number 3.

In 2020 Makely was cast as the legendary professional wrestler Randy Savage in the television series Young Rock, which is based on the early life of Dwayne Johnson.

== Personal life ==
He is married to Christi Makely.
