= Freddy vs. Jason =

2003 American slasher film by Ronny Yu

- Theatrical release poster
- Directed by: Ronny Yu
- Written by: Damian Shannon; Mark Swift
- Based on: Characters by: Wes Craven; Victor Miller
- Produced by: Sean S. Cunningham
- Starring: Monica Keena; Kelly Rowland; Jason Ritter; Christopher George Marquette; Lochlyn Munro; Robert Englund
- Cinematography: Fred Murphy
- Edited by: Mark Stevens
- Music by: Graeme Revell
- Production companies: New Line Cinema; Crystal Lake Entertainment
- Distributed by: New Line Cinema
- Release date: August 15, 2003
- Running time: 97 minutes
- Countries: Canada; United States
- Language: English
- Budget: $30 million
- Box office: $117 million

Freddy vs. Jason is a 2003 American supernatural slasher film directed by Ronny Yu and written by Damian Shannon and Mark Swift, featuring the characters Freddy Krueger from A Nightmare on Elm Street and Jason Voorhees from Friday the 13th, created by Wes Craven and Victor Miller, respectively. It is a crossover between the two franchises, serving as the eighth installment in A Nightmare on Elm Street series and the eleventh installment in the Friday the 13th series. The film stars Monica Keena, Kelly Rowland, Jason Ritter, Christopher George Marquette, Lochlyn Munro, and Robert Englund reprising his role as Krueger from previous films.

The film is a sequel to both Freddy's Dead: The Final Nightmare (1991) and Jason Goes to Hell: The Final Friday (1993), taking place before the events of Jason X (2001). After being trapped in Hell, Freddy Krueger finds himself weakened and forgotten, with the residents of Springwood taking medication to suppress their dreams. To regain his power, he resurrects Jason Voorhees to spread fear and restore his strength. However, Voorhees soon proves uncontrollable, setting the stage for a violent clash between the two supernatural killers.

Freddy vs. Jason was released by New Line Cinema in the United States on August 15, 2003. Despite negative reviews from critics, the film grossed $117 million worldwide, making it the highest-grossing film in the Friday the 13th franchise, and the second highest-grossing film in A Nightmare on Elm Street franchise, only behind the 2010 remake. The film marks Englund's final portrayal as Krueger and was the last released film in each franchise's continuity before their respective remake and reboot. A sequel and crossover with the Evil Dead franchise, Freddy vs. Jason vs. Ash, was planned but later repurposed as a comic book limited series, along with a follow-up subtitled The Nightmare Warriors.

== Plot ==
Having been trapped in Hell since his last defeat, (Note: As depicted in Freddy's Dead: The Final Nightmare (1991)) Freddy Krueger can no longer invade children's dreams. His powers have been weakened by the adults of Springwood, who have erased all evidence of his existence and institutionalized anyone who dreams of him at Westin Hills Psychiatric Hospital, where they are administered the dream suppressant Hypnocil. Seeking to escape, Freddy finds Jason Voorhees, who was also dragged into Hell. (Note: As depicted in Jason Goes to Hell: The Final Friday (1993)) Using the last of his power, he resurrects Jason by assuming the form of Jason's mother Pamela, and manipulates him into carrying out a massacre on Elm Street so that the renewed fear will restore his strength.

Teenager Lori Campbell lives with her widowed father. While hanging out with her friends Kia and Gibb, Gibb's emotionally abusive boyfriend Trey, and his friend Blake, Jason murders Trey before killing Blake and Blake's father. The police assume Freddy has returned and Lori overhears them say his name. Lori's ex-boyfriend, Will Rollins, and his friend Mark Davis—patients at Westin Hills due to prior encounters with Freddy—see a news report about the killings and escape to warn her. That night, Lori and her friends attend a rave in a cornfield. Freddy attempts to kill a passed-out Gibb in a nightmare, but Jason kills her in the real world and goes on a rampage at the rave. Freddy realises that Jason's indiscriminate killings deprive him of victims.

The survivors flee with school nerd Charlie Linderman and stoner Bill Freeburg. Will reveals that he witnessed Lori's father killing her mother and believes he was institutionalised to prevent him from revealing the truth. Soon after, Mark is killed in a dream by Freddy, who burns "Freddy's Back" into his body to spread fear further. Suspecting his colleagues are concealing the truth about Freddy, new Deputy Scott Stubbs assists the teens. Lori falls asleep and is attacked by Freddy, inadvertently pulling a fragment of him into the real world when she awakens. After learning about Hypnocil, the group attempts to steal it from Westin Hills to suppress their dreams. Freddy possesses Bill and disposes of the drug, while Jason kills Stubbs during the ensuing chaos. The possessed Bill then tranquilises Jason, but before the sedative takes full effect, Jason slashes him in half.

The teens devise a plan to draw Freddy out into the real world and force him to fight Jason, transporting the unconscious Jason to Camp Crystal Lake. In the dream world, Freddy tortures Jason by exploiting his fear of drowning. Lori enters the dream to confront Freddy, learns that he murdered her mother, and that Will had misinterpreted what he saw, as her father had been attempting to wake her. She awakens and pulls Freddy into reality as Jason rises at Camp Crystal Lake and attacks.

Charlie attempts to fend off Jason to save Kia but is thrown into a wall and fatally impaled. As Freddy and Jason battle across the campgrounds, Kia distracts Freddy to allow Lori and Will to escape, but is killed by Jason. Freddy gains the upper hand against Jason until Lori intervenes, enabling Jason to punch through Freddy's torso. Freddy drives Jason's machete into his side, and Jason tears off Freddy's gloved arm. Lori and Will ignite the dock, triggering an explosion that sends both killers into the lake. Freddy resurfaces and attempts to kill them, but Jason impales him with his severed arm before falling back into the lake. Lori then beheads Freddy with Jason's machete.

The following morning, Jason emerges from the lake holding Freddy's severed head, which winks and laughs.

== Cast ==
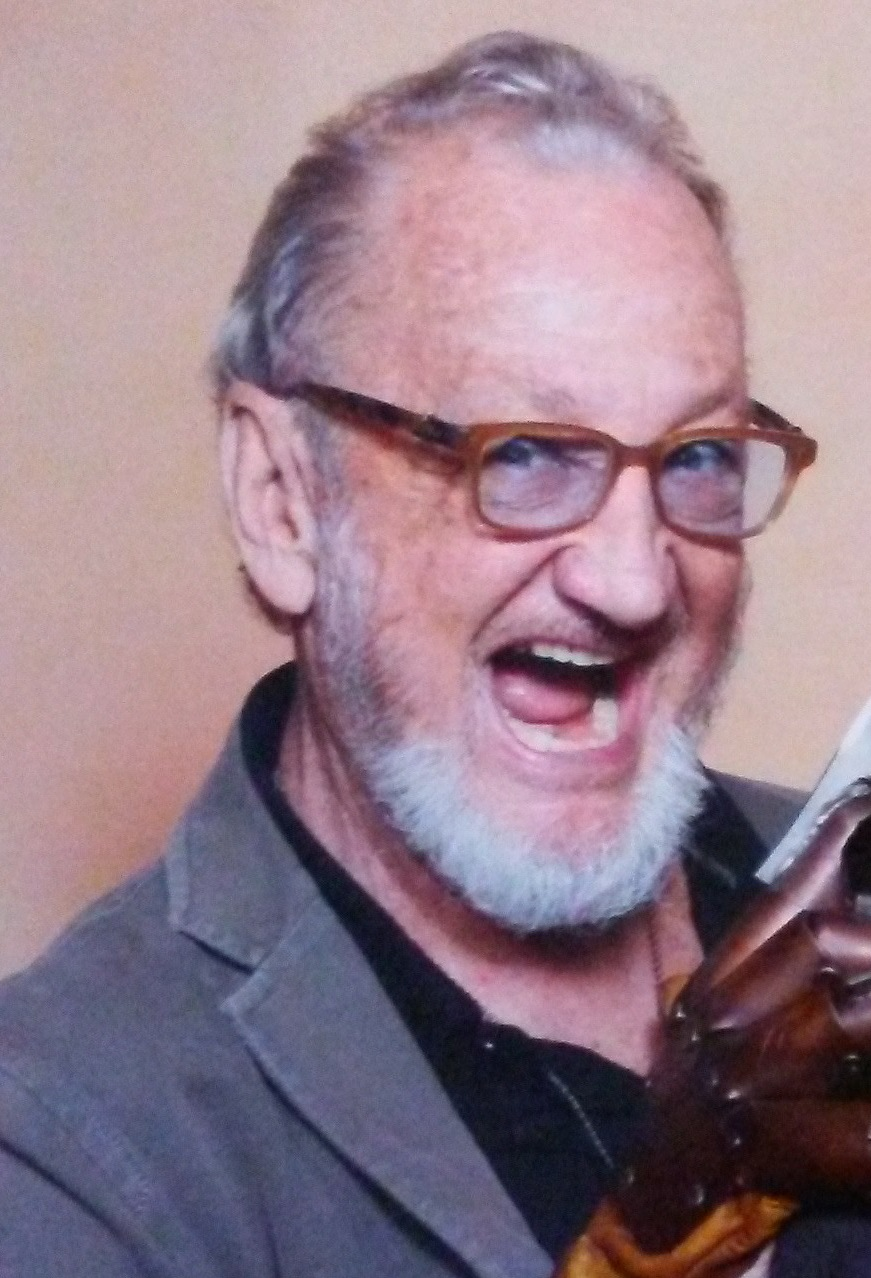
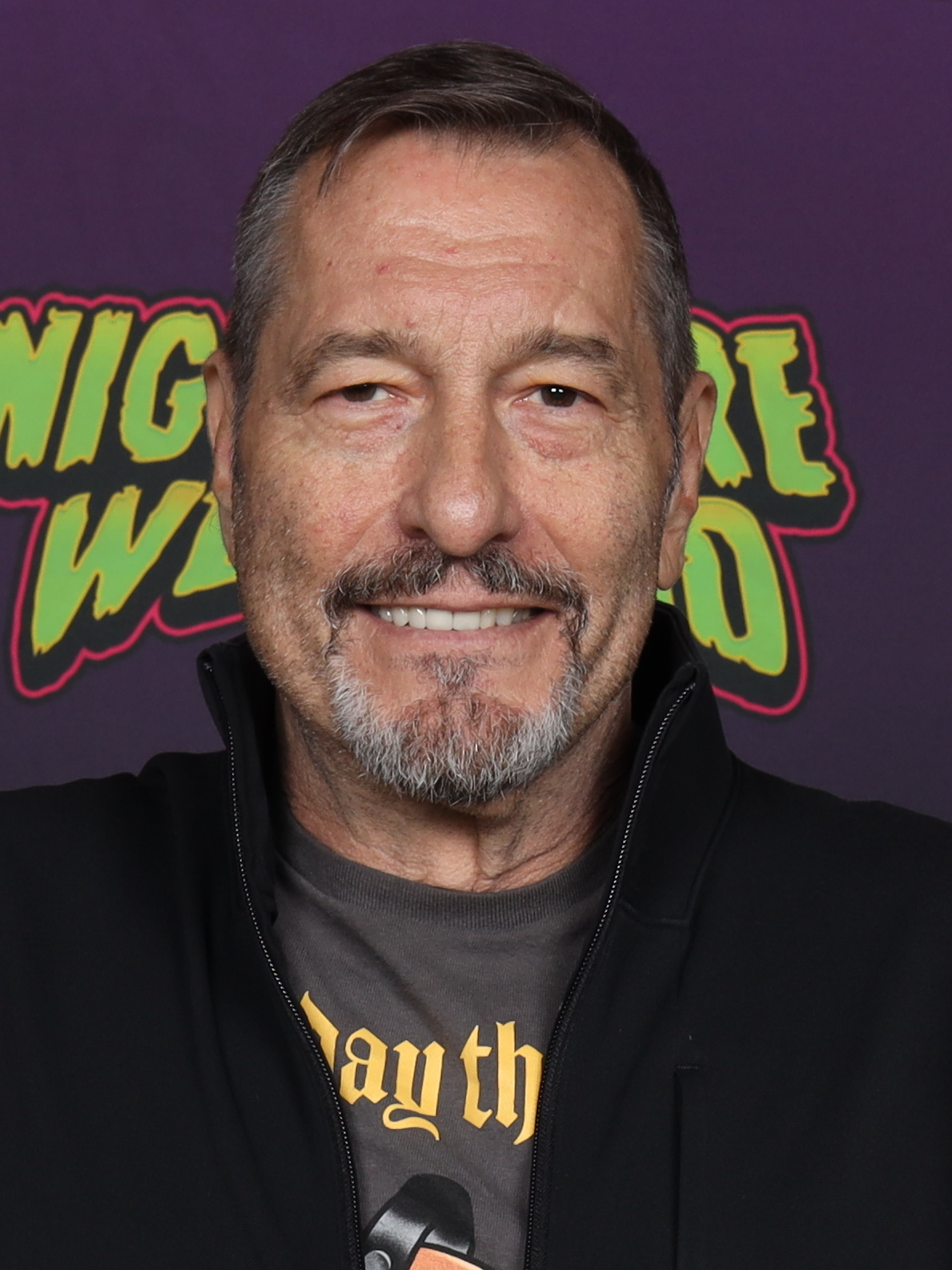
Robert Englund (pictured in 2017) and Ken Kirzinger (2024)
- Robert Englund as Freddy Krueger
- Ken Kirzinger as Jason Voorhees
  - Spencer Stump as young Jason Voorhees
- Monica Keena as Lori Campbell
- Kelly Rowland as Kia Waterson
- Jason Ritter as Will Rollins
- Christopher George Marquette as Charlie Linderman
- Lochlyn Munro as Deputy Scott Stubbs
- Katharine Isabelle as Gibb Smith
- Brendan Fletcher as Mark Davis
- Zack Ward as Bobby Davis, Mark's older brother
- Tom Butler as Dr. Campbell
- Kyle Labine as Bill Freeburg
- Paula Shaw as Pamela Voorhees
- Garry Chalk as Sheriff Williams
- Jesse Hutch as Trey Cooper
- David Kopp as Blake
- Chris Gauthier as Shack

Additionally, Evangeline Lilly had a walk-on role as a high school student. New Line Cinema studio chief Robert Shaye, who produced every preceding Nightmare on Elm Street film, played the school principal (credited as L.E. Moko).

== Production ==
=== Development ===
Influenced by fan desire for a crossover film with a fight between Freddy Krueger and Jason Voorhees, from the respective A Nightmare on Elm Street and Friday the 13th franchises, New Line Cinema and Paramount Pictures tried to make a Freddy vs. Jason film in 1987. Frank Mancuso Jr. enlisted Tom McLoughlin to unite the studios, but no agreement could be made. When Friday the 13th Part VIII: Jason Takes Manhattan failed at the box office, Sean S. Cunningham wanted to reacquire the rights to Friday the 13th and begin working with New Line on Freddy vs. Jason. Paramount and New Line wanted the license to the other's character so they could control a crossover film. Negotiations on the project collapsed, and Paramount made Jason Takes Manhattan. After Jason Takes Manhattan was released in 1989, the rights reverted to Scuderi, Minasian, and Barsamianto (who sold them to New Line). Two years after initial talks fell apart, director Joseph Zito attempted to revive the project, but neither Mancuso nor Robert Shaye were interested in pursuing the project. Before Cunningham could begin to work on Freddy vs. Jason, Wes Craven returned to New Line to make New Nightmare. This put Freddy vs. Jason on hold, but allowed Cunningham to bring Jason back with Jason Goes to Hell: The Final Friday. The ninth installment "turned a healthy profit". In a 1995 interview with Fangoria, Craven was dismissive of the idea of Freddy vs. Jason, saying it was taking "something that had a lot of impact and dignity and dragging it down to another level." Cunningham's "frustration" with the delayed development of Freddy vs. Jason led him to create Jason X to keep the series alive. Based on Jason Takes Manhattan's concept of taking Jason away from Crystal Lake, the tenth film put the titular character in space. The film lost its biggest supporter with the resignation of president of production Michael De Luca. Lack of support let the finished film sit for two years before it was released on April 26, 2002. It was the series' lowest-grossing film at the domestic box office, and had the largest budget of any of the films to date. Jason Goes to Hell duo Adam Marcus and Dean Lorey were courted early on, but no official deal was finalized.

New Line spent a reported $6 million on script development alone from several different writers. Lewis Abernathy was the first screenwriter attached to the film. Abernathy sought to direct his script, entitled Nightmare 13: Freddy Meets Jason, but his limited directing experience prohibited him from doing so. David J. Schow was given an offer to write the script because he just happened to walk by De Luca's office one day. Schow revised Abernathy's script, expanding upon a cult that worships Freddy Krueger. In 1994, De Luca passed on the draft and turned to Brannon Braga and Ronald D. Moore, who wrote Jason vs. Freddy, which had a more "adult tone" than previous entries. The writing duo would depart the film and would be replaced by Peter Briggs, who impressed the studio with his previous crossover attempt, Alien vs. Predator. Briggs' draft saw numerous returning characters across several films. By 1996, Cyrus Voris and Ethan Reiff were commissioned by Cunningham to write a new script, under the title Freddy vs. Jason: Millennium Massacre, with make-up artist Rob Bottin set to direct. New Line previously offered the spot to Guillermo del Toro and Peter Jackson to no avail. Bottin opted to drop the current draft of the script and penned his own treatment. David S. Goyer and his writing partner James Dale Robinson were subsequently hired to flesh out Bottin's treatment into a screenplay. No parties involved were happy with the script, leading to Goyer and Robinson exiting the film. Bottin and his treatment were retained despite clashing with the studio over the film's budget. Screenwriting duo Jonathan Aibel and Glenn Berger were selected by the director to write a new script. The draft was widely disliked at Cunningham Productions. Bottin initially considered revising the script himself, but ultimately left the film altogether.

In 1999, Mark Verheiden entered the project and proposed releasing the film with two different endings; one with Freddy winning and one with Jason winning. The next year, De Luca hired Mark Protosevich to write an entirely new script. Jason X writer Todd Farmer wrote for the film as well. Newcomers Mark Swift and Damian Shannon were hired after delivering a pitch that De Luca was happy with in March 2002. Goyer returned to the project once again in an effort to trim "every ounce of fat" from Swift and Shannon's 120-page script. Craven, del Toro, and Ronny Yu all declined the opportunity to direct the film. Rob Zombie turned the film down in favor to helm House of 1000 Corpses. Then up-and-coming filmmaker Jaume Balagueró campaigned to direct the film. Yu would ultimately sign on to direct the film in May 2002 after being given an "enormous" amount of creative freedom. According to Swift and Shannon, several endings were considered for the film; one involved a surprise appearance from Pinhead of the Hellraiser franchise, but New Line did not want to secure the rights for the character. The setting of Westin Hills Psychiatric Hospital and the Hypnocil drug were plot elements introduced in A Nightmare on Elm Street 3: Dream Warriors.

=== Casting ===
In 1999, Robert Englund officially signed onto the film, marking his eighth appearance as the character of Freddy Krueger. In August 2002, Entertainment Weekly revealed Kelly Rowland and Brad Renfro were cast in the film, while Kane Hodder would reprise his role as Jason Voorhees. However, conflicting reports emerged with IGN stating that the film was looking to reinvent the character, thus ditching Hodder. Monica Keena was selected to portray the film's lead after an "extensive search", while the supporting cast were made up of Canadian actors, including Katharine Isabelle, Lochlyn Munro, Brendan Fletcher, Tom Butler, David Kopp, Jesse Hutch, Kyle Labine and Zack Ward. Betsy Palmer was courted to reprise her role as Pamela Voorhees from Friday the 13th, but declined due to salary disputes. Actress Paula Shaw would assume the role from Palmer. Just one week before production commenced, Jason Ritter was cast in place of Renfro.

==== Recasting Jason ====
New Line, thinking that Freddy vs. Jason needed a fresh start, chose a different actor to play Jason. Cunningham disagreed with their decision, believing that Kane Hodder, who had played Jason in the previous four films, was the best choice for the role. Although Hodder received a script for Freddy vs. Jason and met with director Ronny Yu and New Line executives, Yu and Matthew Barry felt that the role should be recast to fit Yu's image of Jason. Hodder said that New Line did not give him a reason for the recasting; according to Yu, however, he wanted a taller, slower and more-deliberate Jason. The role went to Ken Kirzinger, a Canadian stuntman who worked on Jason Takes Manhattan. Yu said that Kirzinger was hired because he was taller than Robert Englund, who played Freddy Krueger. Kirzinger is 6 feet 5 inches (196 cm) tall, compared to the 6-foot-3-inch (191 cm) Hodder, and Yu wanted a much taller actor than the 5-foot-9-inch (175 cm) Englund. Kirzinger believed that his experience on Part VIII (doubling for Hodder in two scenes) and his height helped him land the part. New Line did not cast Kirzinger until they saw him on film, and his first scene was Jason walking down Elm Street. Douglas Tait played Jason in a re-shot ending:

Unfortunately for me, it was the only scene I was hired to do. The test audiences were confused about the original ending, they thought Jason Ritter's character was becoming Jason [sic]. You can see it in the deleted scenes, that is why they decided to re-shoot the ending. Originally I was being considered for playing the role of Jason in the entire film. It was actually between me and Ken. When they took the film to Canada, I was out of luck. There was no way they were going to pay for my flight and hotel stay when Ken was a local. Also, Ken is older than me and he was a lot more established in the business than I was at the time ... I was on the film for a couple days. The water sequence took a lot of preparation. They realized that when I got wet, I looked too skinny in the clothes, so they had to bulk me up with pads and extra clothing so it would look like I was still big. Being with all this extra weight, one eye covered, a machete in one hand, Freddy's head in another hand, and being totally submerged in water, made that scene very difficult. Also, Ronny Yu wanted me to walk like I was walking on land. He wanted it to look like I could walk through the water without it making me rise to the surface. To do this effect, they had a rope tied under water that I held onto with my left hand (with Freddy's severed head in it also), and I held myself down on the ground so I could pull myself and walk forward.

=== Filming ===
Filming for Freddy vs. Jason began on September 9, 2002 in Vancouver and ended on December 10, 2002.

== Music ==
The soundtrack album was released on August 12, 2003, by Roadrunner Records and the score album by composer Graeme Revell was released on August 19, 2003, by Varèse Sarabande on CD. In 2021, Death Waltz Recording Company released the score on vinyl. Varèse Sarabande re-released the score on October 16, 2015 as part of 8-CD box set A Nightmare on Elm Street with a different number of tracks and a total length.

== Release ==
The film was released on VHS and DVD as part of New Line's Platinum Series on January 13, 2004. The DVD release contained a second disc of bonus content with audio commentary by Ronny Yu, Ken Kirzinger and Robert Englund, and deleted and alternate scenes with commentary. Ill Niño's music video for "How Can I Live"; trailers and TV ads, soundtrack promotion and behind-the-scenes featurettes. The film was released on October 4, 2005 on Universal Media Disc and September 8, 2009 on Blu-ray. The Blu-ray release had the same content as the Platinum Series DVD. The film grossed $722,874 in Blu-ray disc sales.

== Reception ==
=== Box office ===
Freddy vs. Jason has grossed $83 million in the United States and Canada and $34 million in other territories for a total of $117 million, against a production budget of $30 million.

The film earned $36.4 million in its opening weekend at 3,014 theaters in North America, topping the box office. It remained number one in its second weekend grossing $13.4 million, and dropped to sixth place in its third weekend with $7.1 million.

=== Critical response ===
On the review aggregator website Rotten Tomatoes, 42% of 214 critics' reviews are positive, with an average rating of 5/10. The website's consensus reads: "A gleefully brainless, blood-soaked clash of horror icons, Freddy vs. Jason ends up being more of a letdown than a showdown, with its fleeting guilty pleasures buried beneath bad dialogue and excessive gore." Metacritic, which uses a weighted average, assigned the film a score of 37 out of 100, based on 29 critics, indicating "generally unfavorable" reviews. Audiences polled by CinemaScore gave it an average grade of "B+" on an A+-to-F scale.

Kim Newman of Empire gave the film three stars out of five, writing: "FVJ ignores any attempts at cleverness and picks up storylines dropped in Freddy's Dead and Jason Goes to Hell". Sacha Molitorisz of The Sydney Morning Herald wrote: "this is a solid effort, with enough frights, humour, blood, surprises and killer dialogue to entertain consistently." Robert K. Elder of the Chicago Tribune gave the film two and a half stars out of four, saying that it "succeeds as a guilty pleasure, a monster mash that clobbers the recent lackluster sequels plaguing both legacies."

In an interview with Entertainment Weekly published in 2023, Robert Englund said he was proud of Freddy vs. Jason: "It took the genius of Ronny Yu. I'm really proud of that film. It's really fun to see on a nice big flat screen with the sound turned up and some cold pizza."

Linda Cardellini who played the young Pamela in the television series Crystal Lake, watched the film she said: "I remember one of my most fun moviegoing experiences was I saw Freddy vs. Jason on the Universal City Walk, which is a giant movie theater, at the height of its popularity, and people were screaming at the screen and throwing things".

=== Accolades ===
Doug Chapman and Glenn Ennis were nominated for the Best Fire Stunt award at the Taurus World Stunt Awards 2004 for the double full-body burn and wire stunt. Chapman doubled for Robert Englund as Freddy and Ennis doubled for Ken Kirzinger as Jason in the stunt. The film was also nominated for Best Horror Film at the Saturn Awards.

== Novelization ==
Black Flame published a novelization of the film on July 29, 2003.

== Video game ==
In May 2006, Sammy released a pachinko machine CR Freddy vs. Jason based on the film.

== Bibliography ==
- Bracke, Peter (2006), Crystal Lake Memories: The Complete History of Friday The 13th, Titan Books, ISBN 9781845763435
- Grove, David (2005), Making Friday the 13th: The Legend of Camp Blood, FAB Press, ISBN 9781903254318
