= When a Stranger Calls (film series) =

American horror-thriller film franchise

- Official franchise logo, as released in 2006.
- Based on: an Original story by Steve Feke & Fred Walton
- Distributed by: Columbia Pictures; Screen Gems (Sony Pictures Entertainment)
- Country: United States
- Language: English
- Budget: $16,500,000 (2 films)
- Box office: $69,271,372 (2 films)

The When a Stranger Calls franchise consists of American psychological-thriller installments, including the original 1979 theatrical release, its television movie sequel, and its 2006 theatrical remake, and also the 1977 short film The Sitter, which started it all. The plot centers around a teenage high school student who works as a successful babysitter, who one night is harassed with disturbing phone calls from an unknown man while she is caring for an isolated home. As she continues through the night, the calls become more threatening and she urgently seeks the help of local law enforcement, the location of the assailant is revealed to be closer than she would like; forcing the young woman to fight for her life.

The movies have been met with mixed critical reception ranging from moderate to negative reviews; however, praise was directed towards the cast of the original, with its sequel being called more effective and scary as well as commending the filmmaking growth that Walton showcased. The 2006 remake has in years since, received positive reception for its modern adaptation of the story while being categorized as a "gateway" horror film.

== Films ==
Film	U.S. release date	Director	Screenwriter(s)	Producer(s)
When a Stranger Calls	September 28, 1979	Fred Walton	Steve Feke & Fred Walton	Doug Chapin and Steve Feke
When a Stranger Calls Back	April 4, 1993	Fred Walton	Fred Walton	Tom Rowe
When a Stranger Calls	February 3, 2006	Simon West	Jake Wade Wall	John Davis, Wyck Godfrey and Ken Lemberger

=== When a Stranger Calls (1979) ===
Jill Johnson, a young high school student works as a babysitter for a wealthy family. One night as she's caring for their kids, a caller begins to make strange prank calls which progresses into threatening statements towards the children. As time goes on, Jill begins to realize that the calls are not in a joking nature and she calls the police for assistance. Though the law enforcement initially questions the nature of the phone calls as well, but with the help of Detective John Clifford they determine that the calls are coming from inside the house. Upon this revelation, the young woman must fight for her life and to save the little ones as well.

=== When a Stranger Calls Back (1993) ===
Julia Jenz, a young responsible college student who is introverted in nature begins to believe that terrors of her past are returning in her life. When she was younger in high school, she had been babysitting two young children for a doctor and his wife while they were away. A stranger had knocked on the door asking for her to help him call for automotive assistance due to some car troubles he was having. Upon trying to assist him she discovered that the telephone line was down, and in horror discovered that he had abducted the children while she was distracted.

As it took her years to cope with the psychological ramifications of the experience, she is convinced that the same man has once again began to stalk her. Though many question her sanity, school counselor Jill Johnson believes her as she too lived a similar nightmare when she was young. Together they enlist the help of retired police officer John Clifford, who had assisted Johnson many years ago. As the circumstances of Julia's lurker become more dire, the group races to discover the man's identity before it's too late.

=== When a Stranger Calls (2006) ===
Jill Johnson, a high school teenager who works as a babysitter at night, arrives to care for the children at a luxurious mansion in an isolated location. Their parents are leaving for the night, and the children are fast asleep. As she looks through the channels, she finds that a gruesome murder had taken place earlier that night. Relieved that she is far away from the scene of the crime, she soon begins to receive a series of calls from an unknown caller. Initially suspecting them to be a prank in nature, the caller begins to be sadistic and frightening in nature as he begins to threaten her and the children.

When Jill reaches out to the police, she is instructed to secure the house and to do here best to keep the caller on the line as long a possible so that they can track the source. Her ordinary evening, quickly escalates into living nightmare when the law enforcement call her and let her know that the calls have been coming from somewhere inside the house. The police race to her aid, before they're too late as the stranger attacks. In a series of horrific events, Jill must rescue the children and escape with their lives.

== Short film ==
=== The Sitter (1977) ===
Title	U.S. release date	Director	Writer(s)	Producer
The Sitter	1977	Fred Walton	Steve Feke & Fred Walton	Steve Feke

In early 1977, Fred Walton and his old college friend Steve Feke were throwing around story ideas for a film and Feke told him the legendary tale of "The babysitter and the man upstairs" which Walton felt had potential for a film. The production of The Sitter was made on a low budget with both Feke and Walton working steadily for the financing, including their friends' contributing $1,000 here and there. The 22-minute film, shot on 35mm in three days in May 1977 on a budget of $12,000, closely prefigures the opening twenty minutes of When a Stranger Calls, now consistently regarded as one of the scariest openings in horror movie history. Once post-production on The Sitter was completed, Walton and Feke realized that the market for short films wasn't nearly as good as they had both anticipated. Although major studios were not interested in the short film, they were able to land a one-week showing at a theatre for consideration at the 1977 Academy Awards to qualify a nomination for Best Live Action Short. The Sitter had a short theatrical run being screened before Looking for Mr. Goodbar at Mann's Village Theatre in Westwood, California. In spite of its good reception, the film did not get nominated for an Oscar.

== Main cast and characters ==
Character	Films		
Character	When a Stranger Calls (1979)	When a Stranger Calls Back	When a Stranger Calls (2006)
Jill Johnson	Carol Kane	Carol Kane	Camilla Belle
Curt Duncan The Stranger	Tony Beckley	Referenced	
Det. John Clifford	Charles Durning	Charles Durning	
Julia Jenz		Jill Schoelen	
William Landis The Stranger		Gene Lythgow	
The Stranger			Tommy Flanagan Lance Henriksen^{V}
Det. Harv Hines			Steve Eastin
Ofc. Burroughs			David Denman
Ofc. Lewis			John Bobek

== Additional crew and production details ==
Title	Crew/Detail					
Title	Composer	Cinematographer	Editor	Production companies	Distributing companies	Running time
When a Stranger Calls (1979)	Dana Kaproff	Donald Peterman	Sam Vitale	Melvin Simon Productions	Columbia Pictures	1 hr 37 mins
When a Stranger Calls Back	Dana Kaproff	David Geddes	David Byron Lloyd	Krost/Chapin Productions, The Producers Entertainment Group, Pacific Motion Pictures	Showtime	1 hr 34 mins
When a Stranger Calls (2006)	James Dooley	Peter Menzies Jr.	Jeff Betancourt	Screen Gems, TeleStranger Productions Inc.	Sony Pictures Releasing	1 hr 27 mins

== Reception ==
=== Box office and financial performance ===
Film	Box office gross			Box office ranking		Video sales gross	Worldwide total gross income	Budget	Worldwide total net income	Ref.
Film	North America	Other territories	Worldwide	All time North America	All time worldwide	Video sales gross	Worldwide total gross income	Budget	Worldwide total net income	Ref.
When a Stranger Calls (1979)	$21,411,158	—N/a	$21,411,158	#8,427	#14,141	Information not publicly available	>$21,411,158	$1,500,000	$19,911,158	
When a Stranger Calls Back	—N/a	—N/a	—N/a	—N/a	—N/a	$112,707	≥$112,707	Information not publicly available	≤$112,707	
When a Stranger Calls (2006)	$47,860,214	$19,355,221	$67,215,435	#1,900	#3,441	$13,936,079	$81,151,514	$15,000,000	$66,151,514	
Totals	$69,271,372	$19,355,221	$69,271,372	x̄ #3,442	x̄ #5,861	>$14,048,786	≥$29,675,379	>$16,500,000	≤$13,175,379	

=== Critical and public response ===
Film	Rotten Tomatoes	Metacritic	CinemaScore	
Film	When a Stranger Calls (1979)	38% (16 reviews)	58/100 (7 reviews)	—N/a
When a Stranger Calls Back	63% (8 reviews)	—N/a	—N/a	
When a Stranger Calls (2006)	9% (91 reviews)	27/100 (20 reviews)	B−	

== Home media ==
Title	Format	Discs	Region 1	Region 2	Region 4	Special features	Distributors
When a Stranger Calls (1979)	Blu-ray	01	—	3 December 2018	—	Content New Special Features	Second Sight
When a Stranger Calls Back	Blu-ray	01	2018	—	—	Content New Special Features	Scream Factory
When a Stranger Calls (2006)	Blu-ray	01	—	—	4 December 2014	None	Umbrella Entertainment

== See also ==
- List of films featuring home invasions
