= When a Stranger Calls =

When a Stranger Calls may refer to:

- When a Stranger Calls, a horror film series
  - When a Stranger Calls (1979 film), a horror film
  - When a Stranger Calls Back, sequel to the 1979 film
  - When a Stranger Calls (2006 film), a remake of the 1979 film
- "When a Stranger Calls" (Scream), episode of a television series
