= The Rosary Murders =

1987 American mystery film

- Theatrical release poster
- Directed by: Fred Walton
- Screenplay by: Elmore Leonard; Fred Walton
- Based on: The Rosary Murders by William X. Kienzle
- Produced by: Robert G. Laurel
- Starring: Donald Sutherland; Charles Durning; Belinda Bauer; Josef Sommer
- Cinematography: David Golia
- Edited by: Sam Vitale
- Music by: Bobby Laurel; Don Sebesky
- Production company: The Samuel Goldwyn Company
- Distributed by: New Line Cinema
- Release date: August 27, 1987
- Running time: 105 minutes
- Country: United States
- Language: English
- Box office: $1.7 million

The Rosary Murders is a 1987 American mystery crime film directed by Fred Walton, and starring Donald Sutherland, Charles Durning, Belinda Bauer, and Josef Sommer. The plot follows a series of gruesome murders occurring within a Detroit Roman Catholic parish. It is based upon the 1979 novel of the same name by William X. Kienzle. Kienzle received screenplay credit, as did Elmore Leonard.

== Plot ==
In a Roman Catholic parish in Detroit, a series of murders rapidly unfolds: first, Father James Lord is killed on Ash Wednesday by an unknown assailant who unplugs the respirator in his hospital room. Shortly after, Sister Ann Peschal informs her superior, Father Robert Koesler, that she intends to leave the convent, as she has fallen in love with a man and wishes to marry him. The next morning, she is found by Koesler stabbed to death in her bathtub. A third victim, Father Dailey, is then shot to death inside a confessional booth in the chapel. Each body is found clutching a black rosary.

Koesler's commitment to the Church is tested when a man claiming to be the killer visits his confessional and blames the church for his teenage daughter's death three years prior. He promises more murders to come before quickly departing. Koesler grapples with the resulting moral conundrum, as the seal of confession forbids him from sharing this critical information with anyone, including the authorities. As he deliberates, the killer strikes again by murdering Father Killeen.

Deeply distraught by these deaths and his moral bind, Father Koesler finds solace in the company of Pat Lennon, an alluring female journalist for the local newspaper who is covering the murders. Not wanting to be alone one evening in the wake of Father Killeen's death, Koesler suggests that the two of them go out somewhere together. The two laughingly agree it is "like a date," and Pat flirtatiously calls him "Father" as they head out to the nearest bar. Early the next morning, Pat and Koesler, in the same clothes from the night before, sit glum- and guilty-faced at a diner counter as the sun comes up. They recoil awkwardly when their hands accidentally touch, but the film does not explicitly reveal what did or did not happen between them overnight.

Koesler continues to prove more liberal than his counterparts in the church. He defies his superior, Father Nabors, by performing a baptism on a child born out of wedlock. Pat attends the baptism and, reluctantly leaving Koesler at the rectory at the end of the night, reveals that she has feelings for him. Koesler does not respond, and Pat leaves disappointed.

After conferring with another priest about the extent of the confessional seal, Koesler concludes that it does not prevent him from working the case on his own, so long as he doesn't tell anyone what the killer revealed in confession. He begins to investigate and eventually identifies the killer's dead daughter as Katherine Javison. Speaking with staff at the Catholic School she attended, he learns that Katherine fell into an inexplicable deep depression in the last year of her life before killing herself. Koesler attempts to speak with Sister Margaret Mary, Katherine's school advisor, but learns that she took a vow of silence after Katherine's death.

That evening at the chapel, Koesler begins to hear a confession and quickly recognizes the voice on the other side of the confessional screen as that of Pat. Although he identifies her by name, Pat continues her confession, citing her sexual promiscuity and a loss of faith among her many sins in the 17 years since her last confession. At her insistence, Koesler completes the confessional process and grants her absolution.

Koesler visits the Javison home but receives no response upon knocking on the door; he climbs through a window into Katherine's bedroom, which has remained unchanged since her death. Koesler finds a framed school photo of Katherine, a pretty, smiling brunette, and a black rosary. He also sees the ceiling lamp and rope that Katherine used to hang herself. Koesler seemingly encounters Katherine's father in the house for a brief moment, but is able to depart unharmed.

Koesler meets with Sister Mary Margaret at the cloister and learns the truth behind Katherine Javison's death. Katherine had confessed to Sister Mary Margaret that she and her father were having an incestuous relationship. Mary Margaret did not believe her and chastised her for lies and sinful thoughts. A month later, when Katherine killed herself, Sister Mary Margaret realized that the girl had been telling the truth. Koesler leaves the cloister just before the killer arrives to murder Sister Mary Margaret.

The murders continue as the police attempt to protect the parish. Eventually, Koesler figures out that each victim's name has a connection to one of the Ten Commandments. Koesler surmises that Nabors may be the next victim (based upon the commandment "Thou shall not bear false witness against thy neighbor"). Indeed, late into the night on Good Friday, Robert Javison arrives to the church and attempts to get Nabors alone. Unable to warn Nabors directly, Koesler attempts to deter Javison from further killing without breaking the confessional seal. Javison reveals to both priests the motive for his serial killings: he had once confessed to Nabors his ongoing sexual relationship with his daughter. Nabors merely told him to "cut it out," ordered him to say some rosary prayers to repent, and granted him absolution for his sin. Javison draws a gun, Koesler tries to intervene, and Javison is shot through the window by police standing guard outside.

In the aftermath of the shooting, Koesler takes Javison's hand in his own and grants him absolution for his sins. The police hand him an old letter they found in Javison's pocket: Katherine's suicide note, offering her father forgiveness. As he reads the note, Koesler is haunted by the memory of Kathy's face in her school photo. He looks up from the letter to find Pat walking in to the room. She's wearing the same clothes she had on the night the two of them spent together. The film ends in a freeze frame on Pat's face.

== Cast ==
- Donald Sutherland as Father Robert Koesler
- Charles Durning as Father Ted Nabors
- Josef Sommer as Lt. Walt Kosnicki
- Belinda Bauer as Pat Lennon
- James Murtaugh as Robert Javison
- Addison Powell as Father Killeen
- Anita Barone as Irene Jimenez
- Tom Mardirosian as Detective Fallon
- Jihmi Kennedy as Officer Knight
- Anna Minot as Sister Mary Margaret
- Mark Margolis as Father Max
- Rex Everhart as Father Skiarski
- Lupe Ontiveros as Sophie
- Stefan Gierasch as Trupiano
- Cordis Heard as Sister Magdala
- Peter Van Norden as Father McGiff

== Production ==
The film was shot in Detroit, at Holy Redeemer parish, a century old Roman Catholic church on Detroit's Southwest side. Musician Jack White makes an uncredited appearance as a young altar boy.

== Release ==
The Rosary Murders was distributed by New Line Cinema, and premiered in Detroit on August 27, 1987, opening in New York City and Los Angeles the following day, August 28.

=== Critical reception ===
In the Los Angeles Times, film critic Kevin Thomas wrote:

The Rosary Murders is an instance of good writing matched by firm, understated direction and some splendid playing from a large cast. In contrast to Walton’s spine-tingling When a Stranger Calls, The Rosary Murders is low-key yet can jolt you out of your seat--even on a second viewing. Sutherland, his hair silvered and close-cropped, radiates intelligence in one of the most substantial, reflective roles of his career. No matter that Durning always seems perfect casting as a priest, for he’s so skillful that he makes each time seem the first.

The Detroit Free Press named the film #32 of "the 50 most essential movies set in Michigan."
