= William X. Kienzle =

American novelist

- Born: William Xavier Kienzle; September 11, 1928; Detroit, Michigan, U.S.
- Died: December 28, 2000 (aged 72); West Bloomfield Township, Michigan, U.S.
- Occupations: Priest; writer
- Spouse: Javan Herman Andrews

William Xavier Kienzle (September 11, 1928 – December 28, 2000) was an American priest and later writer.

== Early life and priesthood ==
Kienzle was born in Detroit, Michigan. Ordained to the priesthood of the Catholic Church in 1954, Kienzle spent 20 years as a parish priest. From 1962 to 1974 he was editor-in-chief of the archdiocese's newspaper, Michigan Catholic, earning an award from Michigan's Knights of Columbus for general excellence in journalism and a Catholic Press Association acknowledgment for editorial writing. Kienzle left the priesthood in 1974 through a process called laicization and reportedly due to the church's refusal to remarry divorcees.

== Later career ==
When Kienzle left the priesthood in 1974, he became the editor-in-chief at MPLS Magazine in Minneapolis. Later moving to Texas, Kienzle was director of the Center for Contemplative Studies at the University of Dallas. During this period, Kienzle authored 24 crime fiction/mystery novels featuring Father Robert Koesler, a Catholic priest.

In 1978, Kienzle published the first and best known of the Father Robert Koesler mystery novels, The Rosary Murders, which was made into a movie in 1987 starring Donald Sutherland as Koesler. The screenplay was co-written by Kienzle with Elmore Leonard and Fred Walton, who also directed the film. The Rosary Murders, like most of Kienzle's mysteries, is set in Detroit. The Cognac Festival du Film Policier in 1988 presented the Audience Award to Walton and a Special Mention Award to Leonard and Walton for the screenplay and dialogues in the 1987 film. In 1980, Kienzle was a National Award Fiction finalist for The Rosary Murders.

== Personal life ==
After leaving the priesthood, Kienzle married Javan Herman Andrews, a journalist from the Detroit Free Press. Kienzle died suddenly from a heart attack at age 73 on December 28, 2000, at home in West Bloomfield, Michigan, while preparing for an appointment with his cardiologist. Javan Kienzle died from metastatic breast cancer on September 30, 2015.

== Books in the Father Robert Koesler Series ==
1. The Rosary Murders (1978)
2. Death Wears a Red Hat (1980)
3. Mind Over Murder (1981)
4. Assault with Intent (1982)
5. Shadow of Death (1983)
6. Kill and Tell (1984)
7. Sudden Death (1985)
8. Deathbed (1986)
9. Deadline for a Critic (1987)
10. Marked for Murder (1988)
11. Eminence (1989)
12. Masquerade (1990)
13. Chameleon (1991)
14. Body Count (1992)
15. Dead Wrong (1993)
16. Bishop As Pawn (1994)
17. Call No Man Father (1995)
18. Requiem for Moses (1996)
19. The Man Who Loved God (1997)
20. The Greatest Evil (1998)
21. No Greater Love (1999)
22. The Sacrifice (1999)
23. Till Death (2000)
24. The Gathering (2002)

== Other books ==
William X. Kienzle's Biography, Judged by Love, was published after William X. Kienzle's death by Javan Herman Andrews Kienzle.

== Sources ==
- Oliver, Myrna (2002-01-02). "William X. Kienzle, 73; Ex-Priest, Author". Los Angeles Times.
