= Dana Kaproff =

American composer

- Born: April 24, 1954 (age 71); Los Angeles, California, U.S.
- Occupation: Composer

Dana Kaproff (born April 24, 1954) is an American composer. He has worked in over 100 films and television programs.

Kaproff was born in Los Angeles, California, the son of a cellist. His uncle was a violinist. He attended the University of California, Los Angeles.

In 2023, he appeared in the Spider-man 77 Fan Show Podcast, and was interviewed about his work on the 1970s Spider-Man television program.

== Filmography ==
- 1976: Once an Eagle, miniseries
- 1977: Empire of the Ants
- 1977: Exo-Man
- 1977-1979: Spider-Man
- 1979: When a Stranger Calls
- 1980: The Big Red One
- 1981-1990: Falcon Crest, soap opera
- 1982: Death Valley
- 1982: Pandemonium
- 1982-1988: Cagney & Lacey
- 1983: The Golden Seal
- 1983: When a Stranger Calls Back, TV horror film
- 1985: Chiller, TV horror film
- 1986: A Smoky Mountain Christmas
- 1986-1987: Starman, television series
- 1997: Indefensible: The Truth About Edward Brannigan, television film
- 2016: Gringo: The Dangerous Life of John McAfee
- 2019: Oliver Sacks: His Own Life
- 2020: Buried in Burma
