= Vigilante (Willie Colón and Héctor Lavoe album) =

1983 studio album

Studio album by Héctor Lavoe and Willie Colón
- Released: 1983
- Genre: Salsa
- Label: Fania Records

Héctor Lavoe and Willie Colón chronology
Que Sentimiento (1981)	Vigilante (1983)	Reventó (1985)

Vigilante (Vigilant) is the eleventh and last studio album released by Willie Colón and Héctor Lavoe as a duo. It was recorded in 1982, intended to be the soundtrack of the film of the same name, and published in 1983 by the Fania Records label. The album was produced by Willie Colón, with Héctor Lavoe providing lead vocals.

== Background ==
It was recorded in 1982 to be the soundtrack of the film of the same name, Vigilante. It was also hoped that the album would relaunch Lavoe's career, who had been going through personal problems and drug addiction. The directors of the Fania label decided to reunite the Colón-Lavoe duo, who had achieved success in previous years. The songs did not go on sale that year due to Jerry Masucci's ambitious proposal to first release the film The Last Fight, starring Rubén Blades and Willie Colón, which would practically cost him the salsa empire created since the mid-1960s. The film did not see great sales unlike the album, which could finally be published in 1983 and achieved the goal of putting Héctor Lavoe back on radio stations.

== Content ==
"Juanito Alimaña" tells the story of a thief who was influenced by bad habits in his neighborhood growing up and ended up becoming a thief who terrorizes anyone who tries to put him in jail. The album also contains the single "Triste y Vacía".

== Track listing ==
1. Triste y Vacía Luis López Cabán Héctor Lavoe 6:05
2. Vigilante Willie Colón Willie Colón 12:23
3. Juanito Alimaña C. Curet Alonso Héctor Lavoe 7:34
4. Pasé la Noche Fumando Willie Colón / C. Curet Alonso Héctor Lavoe y Willie Colón 11:34

== Musicians ==
- Voices - Héctor Lavoe, Willie Colón
- Choirs - Willie Colón, Milton Cardona, Graciela Carriquí, Gabriel Arnon, Doris Eugenio
- Trombones - Leopoldo Pineda, Lewis Khan and Luis López (in Vigilante)
- Congas - Milton Cardona
- Timbales - Johnny Almendra
- Bongo - Jimmy Delgado
- Piano - "Professor" Joe Torres
- Bass - Sal Cuevas
- Maracas and Güiro - Jorge Maldonado
- Cuatro - Yomo Toro (on Vigilante and Pasé La Noche Fumando)
- Soprano Saxophone - Morris Goldberg (on Vigilante)
- Guitar - Georg Wadenius (on Vigilante)
- Strings - Harold Kohon's Ensemble (on Vigilante)

== Credits ==
- Producer - Willie Colon
- Recording Director - Jon Fausty
- Mixing - Willie Colon and Jon Fausty
- Arrangements – Héctor Garrido (Triste y Vacía, Vigilante), Luis Cruz (Juanito Alimaña, Pasé La Noche Fumando)
- Original Album Artwork – Ron Levine
- Lines - Thomas Muriel
