= Recordando a Felipe Pirela =

1979 studio album by Héctor Lavoe

Studio album by Héctor Lavoe
- Released: 1979
- Genre: Salsa
- Length: 31:31
- Label: Fania Records
- Producer: Willie Colón

Héctor Lavoe chronology
Feliz Navidad (1979)	Recordando a Felipe Pirela (1979)	El Sabio (1980)

Recordando a Felipe Pirela is the fifth solo album by Héctor Lavoe. It was released in 1979 under the label of Fania Records, and was produced by Willie Colón. The album was in homage to the famous Venezuelan bolero singer Felipe Pirela.

Background

Héctor Lavoe had long admired Felipe Pirela both as a person and as an artist, and had wanted to pay tribute to him following his death in 1972. The idea for the album took shape with the support of producer Willie Colón, who had produced several of Lavoe's earlier solo albums. From Pirela's extensive discography, Lavoe selected songs including "Sombras Nada Más," considered one of Pirela's most successful recordings, along with "Vieja Carta," "El Infierno," "La Retirada," "Pobre del Pobre," "El Retrato de Mamá," "Sin Explicaciones," and "Castigo."

== Track listing ==
1. "Sombras Nada Más" - 4:02
2. "Vieja Carta" - 3:00
3. "El Infierno" - 4:45
4. "La Retirada" - 3:10
5. "Pobre Del Pobre" - 4:26
6. "El Retrato de Mamá" - 4:53
7. "Sin Explicaciones" - 3:07
8. "Castigo" - 3:15

== Personnel ==
- Héctor Lavoe - Vocals
- Carlos Francetti - Arrangements on "Sombras Nada Más", "Vieja Carta", "El Infierno", "El Retrato de Mamá".
- Jorge Calandrelli - Arrangements on "La Retirada", "Pobre del Pobre".
- Louie Cruz: Arrangements on "Sin Explicaciones".
