= The babysitter and the man upstairs =

Urban legend originating from the 1960s

The babysitter and the man upstairs—also known as the babysitter or the sitter—is an urban legend that dates back to the 1960s about a teenage babysitter who receives telephone calls that turn out to be coming from inside the house. The basic storyline has been adapted a number of times in movies.

== Origins ==
The legend dates as far back as the 1960s, with its exact original inspiration not entirely certain. However, the 1950 unsolved murder of teenage babysitter Janett Christman in Columbia, Missouri, seems to have been an influence, at the very least on later versions via media adaptations.

Days before her 14th birthday, Christman took a babysitting job for a couple, during which she was sexually assaulted and killed by an unknown assailant. One suspect, 27-year-old Robert Mueller, was an acquaintance of both Christman and the couple she was sitting for. Mueller had previously employed Christman as a sitter and was playing cards with the couple on the night of the murder; he left early, claiming he needed to take care of a sick child at home but was determined not to have gone home at that time. Christman called the police with screams for help, but they did not learn her address. When the couple returned, the porch light was on and the front door unlocked, implying Christman had let her attacker in. A side window had been unnecessarily broken out with a garden hoe stowed inside the house.

== Legend ==
The legend details a teenage girl who is watching television at night while babysitting after the children have been put to bed upstairs. The phone rings; the unknown caller tells her to "check the children". The girl dismisses the call, but the anonymous caller dials back several times, and the girl becomes increasingly frightened. Eventually, the babysitter calls the police, who inform her they will trace the next call. After the stranger calls again, the police return her call, advising her to leave immediately. She evacuates the home and the police meet her to explain that the calls were coming from inside the house and that the unidentified prowler was calling her after killing the children upstairs.

=== Other versions ===
Some variants of the story have one or more of these details:

- In more clean versions, the caller turns out to be either one of the children or an elder sibling who decided to scare the babysitter as a prank and they get told off by the police.
- The babysitter is also killed.
- The babysitter rescues the children and the prowler is arrested by police.
- While being taken away by the police, the prowler whispers or says out loud "See you soon!" to the babysitter.
- In some versions, when the prowler calls the babysitter, he just makes scary noises like giggling or heavy breathing. Also in this version, when the operator says that the calls have been coming from the same house, the phone goes quiet, and when the operator asks if the babysitter is still there, all they get is the same scary noises, meaning that the babysitter has already been killed.
- The children are with the babysitter while watching television. The prowler starts phoning them, saying that he'll be with them in a decreasing amount of time. Then after they get the news that the calls are coming from inside the house, they hear a door upstairs opening and then the sound of footsteps heading toward their room. This version can be found in the first book of the Scary Stories to Tell in the Dark books.
- Years later, the babysitter is now an adult and has a family of her own. One evening, she and her husband go to have dinner out while a babysitter looks after the children. The evening is going well until a waiter approaches their table and says that there is a phone call for her. She then answers the phone and hears "Did you check the children?" This is an ending that appears in some of the movie versions.
- The police inform one of the children that they found the prowler under the kid's bed holding a weapon.

==== The Clown Doll/Statue version/legend ====
A similar urban legend is The Clown Statue or The Clown Doll. A babysitter is unnerved by what she assumes is a hideous life-sized statue of a clown in the corner of the room. When the mother or father of the children she is caring for calls home to check in, the babysitter asks if she can cover the clown statue with a blanket. The parent informs the babysitter they do not own a clown statue: the "statue" was really a murderer with dwarfism that dresses in a clown costume.

Due to the nature of this version, its own variants of the story have one or more of these details:

- The children mention the murderous small person stalking them, either early or later in the story.
- The murderous small person pretends to be a clown doll, instead of a clown statue.
- In some versions, the room itself can be the parents' bedroom or the basement, rather than the living room.
- The babysitter gets slowly annoyed by the clown statue sometime later, before calling the parents and getting their permission to cover the clown statue up.
  - In some versions, the babysitter either asks the parents to switch rooms or she walks up and/or down the stairs as a means to avoid seeing the statue.
- The babysitter uses a sheet or something else to cover up the clown statue.
- In some versions, the story takes place in Newport Beach, California.
- In a few versions, the intruder is a perverted homeless person or a vengeful ghost clown who died in that family's home, instead of a murderous small serial killer or a mentally ill patient.

== Use in film ==
- Foster's Release (1971)
- Fright (1971)
- The Severed Arm (1973)
- Black Christmas (1974)
- O Anjo da Noite (1974)
- The Sitter (1977)
- When a Stranger Calls (1979)
- When a Stranger Calls Back (1993)
- Black Christmas (2006)
- When a Stranger Calls (2006)
- When a Killer Calls (2006)
- Amusement (2008)
- Black Christmas (2019)
