= El Sabio =

1980 studio album by Héctor Lavoe

Studio album by Héctor Lavoe
- Released: 1980
- Genre: Salsa
- Label: Fania Records

Héctor Lavoe chronology
| Feliz Navidad (1979) | El Sabio (1980) | Que Sentimiento (1981) |

El Sabio (The Wise Man) is a 1980 album by Héctor Lavoe.

== Track listing ==
1. "El Sabio" (Arreglos musicales por: José Febles) Tito Rodriguez 4:28
2. "Plazos Traicioneros" (Arreglos musicales por: Alberto García) Luis Marquetti 3:34
3. "Noche de Farra" (Arreglos musicales por: José Madera) Armando Dewolff 5:59
4. "Para Ochum" (Arreglos musicales por: Héctor Lavoe) D.R. / D.R.S. 6:33
5. "Aléjate" (Arreglos musicales por: José Febles) Raúl René Rosado 7:05
6. "Lloré" (Arreglos musicales por: José Febles) José Febles 6:20
7. "Ceora" (Arreglos musicales por: José Febles) Lee Morgan 5:45
