= Strikes Back =

1987 studio album by Héctor Lavoe

Studio album by Héctor Lavoe
- Released: 1987
- Genre: Salsa
- Label: Fania Records

Héctor Lavoe chronology
Reventó (1985)	Strikes Back (1987)	The Master and the Protégé (1993)

Strikes Back is the tenth and final studio album by Héctor Lavoe, released in 1987 by Fania Records. The album was the only time Lavoe was nominated for a Grammy Award.

== Track listing ==
1. "Loco" (arrangements by Marty Sheller) Tommy Sánchez 5:23
2. "Ponce" (arrangements by Louie Cruz) Tommy Sánchez 6:14
3. "Taxi" (arrangements by Javier Vásquez) Public Domain 3:45
4. "Como No Voy A Llorar" (arrangements by Louie Cruz) Ricardo Nuñez 6:36
5. "Ella Mintió" (arrangements by Louie Ramírez) Diego Verdaguer / Amanda Miguel / G. Carballo 4:45
6. "En El Fiando" (arrangements by Isidro Infante) Johnny Ortiz 5:22
7. "Escarcha" (arrangements by Marty Sheller) Johnny Ortiz 5:36
8. "Plato de Segunda Mesa" (Arreglos musicales por: Marty Sheller) C. Curet Alonso 4:35

== Personnel ==
- Composer - Amanda Miguel
- Production Assistant - Arturo Ortiz
- Congas - Bobby Allende
- Composer - C. Alonso Curet
- Composer - Diego Verdaguer
- Composer - Graciela Carballo
- Primary Artist, Vocals - Héctor Lavoe
- Engineer - Irving Greenbaum
- Choir/Chorus - Isidro Infante
- Arranger, Choir/Chorus - Javier Vazquez
- Composer - Johnny Ortiz
- Choir/Chorus - Justo Betancourt
- Trombone - Leopoldo Pineda
- Trombone - Lewis Kahn
- Arranger, Choir/Chorus - Louie Cruz
- Choir/Chorus - Louie Ramirez
- Graphic Design - Louise Hilton
- Assistant, Percussion, Production Assistant, Timbales - Marc Quinonez
- Percussion, Timbales - Marc Quiñones
- Arranger - Marty Sheller
- Choir/Chorus - Milton Cardona
- Assistant, Bass - Oskar Cartaya
- Bass, Production Assistant - Oskar Cartaya & the Enclave Cartaya
- Composer - Public Domain
- Bongos - Raymond Colon
- Choir/Chorus - Tito Allen
- Choir/Chorus, Producer - Willie Colón
