= Dimension 404 =

2017 American TV series

- Genre: Science fiction; Black comedy; Comedy drama; Horror; Anthology
- Created by: Will Campos; Desmond Dolly; Daniel Johnson; David Welch
- Starring: Robert Buckley; Lea Michele; Matt Jones; Joel McHale; Sarah Hyland; Daniel Zovatto; Patton Oswalt; Ryan Lee; Sterling Beaumon; Ashley Rickards; Constance Wu; Megan Mullally; Lorenza Izzo; Tom Noonan
- Narrated by: Mark Hamill
- Composer: Cris Velasco
- Country of origin: United States
- Original language: English
- No. of seasons: 1
- No. of episodes: 6

Production
- Executive producers: Desmond Dolly; Matthew Arnold; Freddie Wong; Brian Udovich; Daniel Johnson; David Welch; Will Campos
- Production location: Los Angeles
- Cinematography: Jon Salmon; Tarin Anderson; Steve Calitri
- Editor: Curtis Thurber
- Camera setup: Single-camera
- Running time: 40 minutes
- Production companies: RocketJump; Lionsgate Digital Studios

Original release
- Network: Hulu
- Release: April 4 – April 25, 2017

Dimension 404 is an American science fiction black comedy anthology series created by Desmond "Dez" Dolly and Will Campos, and co-created by Dan Johnson and David Welch. It began airing on April 4, 2017 on the streaming service Hulu. The series is produced by RocketJump and Lionsgate Television. The series is heavily inspired by The Twilight Zone and The Outer Limits. Its title is taken from the 1950s radio program Dimension X and the HTTP status code 404, which signifies an error due to a webpage not being found.

== Cast and characters ==
- Mark Hamill as the Narrator

=== Episode 1: "Matchmaker" ===
- Robert Buckley as Adam
- Lea Michele as Amanda
- Matt Jones as Greg
- Joel McHale as Dr. Matthew Maker
- Karissa Lee Staples as Becky
- Catherine Garcia as Cate
- Mario Garcia as Mario

=== Episode 2: "Cinethrax" ===
- Sarah Hyland as Chloe
- Daniel Zovatto as Zach
- Patton Oswalt as Uncle Dusty
- Casimere Jolette as Brie
- Ashly Burch as Shannon
- Tom Plumley as Concession Stand Teen
- Sean Przano as Cosplay Nerd
- Joey Scoma as Arnie
- CC Weske as Alexis

=== Episode 3: "Chronos" ===
- Ashley Rickards as Susan Hirsch
- Anthony Oh (Stunt person) as Lord Entropy
- Utkarsh Ambudkar as Alex Kapour
- Parry Shen as Unnamed Animator
- Charles Fleischer as Professor Dobkin
- Pepe Serna as Wally Nash
- Matthew Del Negro as Time Ryder
- Julie Dove as Julie Hirsch
- LaLa Nestor as Young Sue Hirsch
- James Babson as Guard #1
- Anthony Alabi as Guard #2

=== Episode 4: "Polybius" ===
- Ryan Lee as Andrew Meyers
- Sterling Beaumon as Jess
- Gabrielle Elyse as Amy
- Ken Foree as Agent X
- Tucker Albrizzi as Dennis
- Adrienne Barbeau as Wilma
- Davis Desmond as Melvin Raimi
- Travis Myers as Coach Wurgler
- Douglas Tait as Polybius Creature
- Chris Wylde as Detective

=== Episode 5: "Bob" ===
- Tom Noonan as Bob
- Megan Mullally as Director Stevens
- Constance Wu as Jane
- Malcolm Barrett as Chris
- Melanie Thompson as Beth
- Chase Williamson as Private Adams

=== Episode 6: "Impulse" ===
- Lorenza Izzo as Val Hernandez / "Speedrun"
- Kenneth Choi as Kojima
- Matt Lauria as Evan
- Cody Johns as Roy Torvald / "Killohertz"
- Jimmy Wong as Commentator
- Noah Segan as Charlie

== Production ==
=== Development ===
The six-episode anthology was ordered to series at Hulu in February 2016, with Dolly taking on the role of showrunner. Freddie Wong, Matthew Arnold, and Dolly were also reported to serve as executive producers on the series, as well as undertaking directing duties for individual episodes. Each episode was planned to be an hour in length, and tell individual stories.

=== Casting ===
On June 8, 2016, it was announced that Lea Michele and Robert Buckley would headline the first episode of the series, and Ryan Lee would take the lead role in a different and unrelated episode. On June 14, 2016, Joel McHale joined the cast to star alongside Michele and Buckley in the first episode, and Sarah Hyland was cast in a leading role in a separate episode. That same month, Patton Oswalt joined to star alongside Hyland, Ashley Rickards was cast to lead a separate episode, and Sterling Beaumon joined to co-star opposite Lee. That same month, Megan Mullally and Constance Wu were cast to appear in the same episode. In July 2016, Lorenza Izzo, Daniel Zovatto, and Tom Noonan joined the cast of the series, with Izzo appearing in a separate episode, Zovatto appearing opposite Hyland, and Noonan appearing opposite Wu and Mullally. On March 21, 2017, it was announced that Mark Hamill narrates the series.

=== Filming ===
Filming for the series began in June 2016.

== Episodes ==
No.	Title	Directed by	Written by	Original release date
1	"Matchmaker"	Stephen Cedars & Benji Kleiman	Story by : Will Campos, Dez Dolly, Daniel Johnson & David Welch; Teleplay by : Will Campos, Dez Dolly, Jake Andrews	April 4, 2017
Adam, a lonely blogger, meets his perfect match through a cutting-edge dating app. But the moment he says "I love you," his life takes a turn for the worse - and Adam discovers a shocking truth that makes him question everything.
2	"Cinethrax"	Dez Dolly	Story by : Will Campos, Dez Dolly, Daniel Johnson & David Welch; Teleplay by : Daniel Johnson, Will Campos, Dez Dolly	April 4, 2017
A snooty cinema purist struggles to convince his fellow filmgoers that the 3D movie they’re watching—screening in a mysterious new format—is summoning forth a brain-sucking interdimensional monster only he can see. Nods to They Live include the protagonist's T-Shirt and the stick of chewing gum.
3	"Chronos"	Dave Boyle	Story by : Will Campos, Daniel Johnson, David Welch; Teleplay by : Will Campos & Dez Dolly	April 4, 2017
A hopelessly nostalgic physics student fights to prove her sanity when no one on Earth can remember her favorite 90s cartoon show.
4	"Polybius"	Dez Dolly	Will Campos & Dez Dolly	April 11, 2017
A young arcade junkie in 1984 attempts to master POLYBIUS, a sinister new game of unknown origin that induces nightmarish visions, but when kids start dying, he must beat the game to unlock its deadly secrets.
5	"Bob"	Matt Arnold & Freddie Wong	Will Campos	April 18, 2017
As a holiday threat looms large, an Army psychologist races against the clock to treat the strangest patient of her career - and the only one who can save Christmas - BOB, a depressed NSA supercomputer.
6	"Impulse"	Matt Arnold & Freddie Wong	Story by : Will Campos, Dez Dolly, Daniel Johnson & David Welch; Teleplay by : Will Campos, Dez Dolly & David Welch	April 25, 2017
A brash, up-and-coming pro FPS gamer finds the edge she needs in an energy drink that gives her real world "bullet time". It's a shortcut to fame and fortune-but it might just be a "shortcut" through the rest of her life.
