= When a Killer Calls =

- DVD cover
- Directed by: Peter Mervis
- Written by: Peter Mervis; Steve Bevilacqua
- Produced by: Sherri Strain; David Rimawi; David Michael Latt
- Starring: Sarah Hall; Mark Irvingsen; Robert Buckley; Derek Osedach; Rebekah Kochan
- Cinematography: Mark Atkins
- Edited by: Peter Mervis
- Music by: Mel Lewis
- Production company: The Asylum
- Distributed by: The Asylum
- Release date: February 2006
- Running time: 91 minutes
- Country: United States
- Language: English

When a Killer Calls is a 2006 direct-to-DVD horror film directed by Peter Mervis and starring Sarah Hall, Mark Irvingsen, Robert Buckley, Derek Osedach, and Rebekah Kochan. It was distributed by B movie company The Asylum. The film was released in February 2006, to coincide with the theatrical release of the 2006 remake of When a Stranger Calls, of which this film is a mockbuster.

== Plot ==
A psychopath goes into a house, killing a mother Linda Hewitt and her two children, Ryan and Holly. In the process, he takes pictures on his cell phone of his crimes. Elsewhere, Trisha Glass (Rebekah Kochan) is babysitting a girl, Molly Walker, while her parents are out at a dinner party where her father is also meant to give a speech. She needs this to go well because her last babysitting job with the Hewitts did not end on a positive note. On their way to the dinner party, Molly's parents are killed by an off-screen assailant that they obviously knew. Meanwhile, Trisha begins getting increasingly threatening phone calls and texts. Trisha looks for Molly and finds her hiding outside behind garbage cans having just played a successful scaring prank on Trisha. They are greeted by Molly's next-door neighbor Charlie who also tells about Molly's ex-babysitter Mrs. Kochs, who, according to Molly, stunk.

In the house, Molly is in her bathroom brushing her teeth and Trisha drying Molly's hair. After Trisha puts Molly to bed, the caller escalates his threats towards her. He sends her pictures of the previous murders claiming he did it for her. Although she believes it is her boyfriend Matt calling her, she calls the police about the harassment and threatening phone calls and they inform her that they will trace the call.

Matt (Robert Buckley), along with his best friend Frank and the latter's girlfriend Chrissy, who are both rather reckless, obnoxious and irresponsible, arrive saying they have been chased by cops after Frank brandished a firearm at the bowling alley's parking lot during an altercation. They ask to stay until it is safe to leave. Charlie sees them going in, but is then killed by the assailant as well. Matt assures Trisha that he had not been making those calls. Going into the basement to make out, Chrissy hears a strange noise. Frank is ambushed when he investigates and Chrissy is attacked when she goes to find him. Worried that Frank is causing trouble again, Trisha has Matt find out what he is doing. When he goes to the basement, he is ambushed and tied up by the intruder.

Watching the news of a triple murder earlier that night, Trisha realizes the pictures sent to her are real and also that they are of Linda, Ryan and Holly. The intruder calls Trisha and informs her that she needs to check on Molly. After the police call to inform her that the calls from both her cell and house phone came from inside the house, she discovers a camera in the living room and she hollers for Matt and Frank and gets more and more frightened when neither responds. She checks on Molly and finds her dead with Richard Hewitt (the murdered family's husband and father and also the killer himself, as well as the killer of Molly's parents, Charlie, Frank and Molly) in the bedroom. She tries to run from him but quickly trips and gets overpowered.

Awakening in the basement, Trisha discovers she is gagged and bound to a rafter, Matt tied up on the floor, Chrissy tied up and gagged on the couch, and Frank dead on the floor. Richard tortures the group first by slashing Chrissy's breasts, throwing liquor on the wounds then he kills her by slitting her throat. Hearing a noise upstairs, Richard goes and discovers two state troopers and kills them. Richard also explains the reason for the murders, revealing he had become obsessed with Trisha after raping her one night. Using this time to free himself, Matt throws the liquor into Richard's face and tries to free Trisha. However, Matt is killed in the process. Trisha manages to run out of the house and retrieves Frank's gun which he stashed in Matt's car. She shoots Richard several times, ensuring he is dead, thus avenging everyone he killed (all the characters in the film killed by the knife). Trisha then walks away from the house into the streets, and obviously, going home.

== Cast ==
- Rebekah Kochan as Trisha Glass
- Robert Buckley as Matt
- Mark Irvingsen as Richard Hewitt
- Sarah Hall as Chrissy
- Derek Osedach as Frank
- Carissa Bodner as Molly Walker
- Chriss Anglin as Mr. Walker
- Tara Clark as Mrs. Walker
- Louis Graham as Charlie
- Isabella Bodnar as Linda Hewitt
- Cheyenne Watts as Holly Hewitt
- Christian Hutcherson as Ryan Hewitt
- Justin Jones as Trent Rockport
- Peter Mervis as Police Officer
- Leigh Scott as Police Officer
- Unknown as Sergeant (uncredited)
- Unknown as Woman on Police Radio (uncredited)
