= Vigilante (1982 film) =

1983 American film directed by William Lustig

- Directed by: William Lustig
- Written by: Richard Vetere
- Produced by: Andrew W. Garroni; William Lustig
- Starring: Robert Forster; Fred Williamson; Richard Bright; Rutanya Alda; Don Blakely; Joseph Carberry; Willie Colón; Joe Spinell; Carol Lynley; Woody Strode
- Cinematography: James Lemmo
- Edited by: Larry Marinelli
- Music by: Jay Chattaway
- Production company: Magnum Motion Pictures Inc.
- Distributed by: Artists Releasing Corporation
- Release date: May 18, 1982; (Cannes)
- Running time: 90 minutes
- Country: United States
- Language: English
- Box office: $5,091,888 (US) or $2,389,000

Vigilante, later released on video as Street Gang, is a 1982 American vigilante film directed by William Lustig and starring Robert Forster and Fred Williamson. Lustig came upon the idea for the film through a news article about "a group of blue collar workers in southern New Jersey who had organized to fight crime in their neighborhood".

== Plot ==
Eddie Marino is a factory worker in New York City and has a wife named Vickie and an eight-year-old son named Scott. Eddie's friend and co-worker Nick and two other co-workers Burke and Ramon have formed a secret vigilante group because Nick and the group are fed up with the crime in their neighborhood. Nick and his group are also tired of the police, because the police always fail to protect people. Nick's "group" has support of various residents of the neighborhood who secretly help them because it does not endanger them like helping the police. One evening, Eddie returns home from work only to discover that Vickie has been stabbed and Scott has been shot dead in a home invasion, in retaliation for Vickie aiding a gas station attendant who was being assaulted earlier.

Frederico "Rico" Melendez, the leader of a multiethnic street gang called the Headhunter Gang, is arrested for the crime. ADA Mary Fletcher seeks a lengthy prison sentence since the state does not have the death penalty. Nick tries to convince Eddie to join the vigilante group, but Eddie turns Nick down, preferring to let the courts handle Rico. Nick's lack of faith in the system is proven correct when Rico is set free by egomaniacal (and perhaps sexist) judge, after his right-hand man Prago pays a slick attorney Eisenburg to get Rico off a felony charge and out of prison with a suspended sentence. In dismay, Eddie raises his voice in front of the judge and is sentenced to 30 days in jail for contempt of court. While Eddie works to survive in jail, the vigilante group tracks down the source of the drugs in their neighborhood. They rough up a small-time drug dealer and torture the pimp who is his supplier, and are led to a high-ranking member of the Mayor's office. Nick kills him and his bodyguard with a shotgun.

Eddie befriends an inmate in the next cell named Rake, who saves him from being assaulted in the showers. After getting released from prison, Eddie joins the vigilante group in order to track down and kill Rico. Eddie, Nick, Burke and Ramon confront Rico in his seedy apartment, where Rico protests it was Prago who killed Eddie's son. An unmoved Eddie fatally shoots Rico, who grievously stabbed Vick. Rico's girlfriend attempts to shoot in reprisal and wounds Burke. and Nick kills her with his shotgun. A member of the gang spies on the corner and identifis all the vigilants. Hearing about Rico's death, Prago takes over command of the gang and swears death to all the vigilantes. The following night, for an unclear reason, Prago and the gang ambush a police car and savagely assassinate the two cops in their car with automatic weapons.

Vickie is released from the hospital, but refuses to come home to Eddie, as she is unable to be in the house where their son was killed and claims she has lost all feeling for her husband. Eddie decides to move away after getting disgusted with himself and the destruction of ten years of his life, which he devoted to his family, by the gang members. He tells Nick that there has to be a place where gangs can't come along and attack people whenever they feel like it. Nick unsuccessfully attempts to persuade him to stay and fight. While leaving Brooklyn, Eddie recognizes Prago and follows him. Prago soon spots Eddie and hijacks a car. Eddie steals another car to follow him. The chase leads to a local dockyard mill where both cars crash. Eddie chases Prago on foot and confronts him on a storage tower. Sadistic and insane to the last, Prago admits of killing Scott and dares Eddie to kill him, saying he doesn't care if he lives or dies; Eddie responds by throwing Prago off the tower to his death. Later, Eddie kills Judge Sinclair by exploding a bomb in his car using the remote control he used to fly a model plane with his son. Eddie drives away to an unknown, new destination.

== Cast ==
- Robert Forster as Eddie Marino
- Fred Williamson as Nick
- Richard Bright as Burke
- Rutanya Alda as Vickie Marino
- Don Blakely as Prago
- Joseph Carberry as Ramon
- Willie Colón as Rico
- Joe Spinell as Eisenberg
- Carol Lynley as Mary Fletcher
- Frank Pesce as "Blueboy"
- Steve James as Patrolman Gibbons (credited as Steve W. James)
- Raymond Serra as Court Officer
- Woody Strode as Rake
- Vincent Beck as Judge Sinclair

== Production ==
Reportedly, the first choices for the roles of Eddie Marino and Mary Fletcher were Tony Musante and Caroline Munro.

== Release ==
Vigilante premiered at the Marché du Film in Cannes on May 18, 1982. This was followed by a sneak preview in New York City on July 23, 1982 and a wide release in the United States on March 4, 1983. It grossed $5,091,888 in the United States.

Blue Underground released it on Blu-ray for the first time in September 2010, and again on Ultra HD Blu-ray in December 2020, boasting a new 16-bit restoration from the original camera negative, HDR10 and Dolby Vision, and a new Dolby Atmos soundtrack.

== Reception ==
Dave Kehr of The New York Times wrote that Vigilante was "directed with classical, self-effacing skill". Kehr identified influence from New York street realism and stated that the film was only possible in the period between the collapses of the Motion Picture Production Code and grindhouse theaters. Randy Fox of the Nashville Scene called the film "a grindhouse classic". Rodney Perkins of Twitch Film called it derivative of Death Wish but memorable for its cast and nihilistic tone. Chris Claro of DVD Verdict called it an incoherent ripoff of Death Wish that is still entertaining. Stuart Galbraith of DVD Talk rated it 2.5/5 stars and called it "an undistinguished, forgettable throwaway".

== See also ==
- List of films featuring home invasions
- List of hood films
- Vigilante (Willie Colón and Héctor Lavoe album)
