= Donald Peterman =

American cinematographer

- Born: Donald William Peterman; January 3, 1932; Los Angeles, California, U.S.
- Died: February 5, 2011 (aged 79); Palos Verdes Estates, California, U.S.
- Other names: Don Peterman
- Years active: 1966–2000
- Organisation: American Society of Cinematographers

Donald William Peterman, ASC (January 3, 1932 – February 5, 2011) was an American cinematographer.

He was a member of the Academy of Motion Picture Arts and Sciences and the American Society of Cinematographers since 1984.

== Early life ==
Peterman was born in Los Angeles.

He graduated from Redondo Union High School in Redondo Beach, California, before serving in the United States Army during the early 1950s. Peterman began shooting documentaries for the U.S. Army during his time in the service.

== Career ==
Peterman began his professional career as a clapper loader for Hal Roach Studios at the age of 22 after leaving the U.S. Army. He departed Hal Roach Studios for Cascade Studios, where he worked the optical printer and animation camera. Peterman left Cascade Studios to work on the Lassie television series, but later returned to Cascade Studios to become director of photography for the studio's television commercial productions.

In 1979, Peterman made his film debut as director of photography with the horror film, When a Stranger Calls. The film is described by Peterman as a "down-and-dirty production". He was able to shoot nighttime scenes in six foot-candles of soft light without the aid of high-speed film stock or lenses.

Peterman was nominated for an Academy Award for Best Cinematography for Flashdance, before receiving his second nomination for Star Trek IV: The Voyage Home.

In 1997, Peterman suffered an accident on the set of Mighty Joe Young. He was on a platform suspended 18 feet from the ground when the crane holding the platform snapped, throwing Peterman to the ground. He suffered head injuries, a broken leg and broken ribs. A cameraman working with him was also injured in the accident. Production was delayed for two days, and Peterman was replaced by Oliver Wood for the remainder of principal photography.

== Death ==
Peterman died at his home in Palos Verdes Estates, California, of myelodysplastic syndrome on February 5, 2011, at the age of 79.

== Filmography ==
Film

Year	Title	Director	Notes
1973	Domo Arigato	Arch Oboler	
1979	When a Stranger Calls	Fred Walton	
1981	King of the Mountain	Noel Nosseck	
1981	Rich and Famous	George Cukor	
1982	Young Doctors in Love	Garry Marshall	
1982	Kiss Me Goodbye	Robert Mulligan	
1983	Flashdance	Adrian Lyne	
1984	Splash	Ron Howard	
1984	Best Defense	Willard Huyck	
1984	Mass Appeal	Glenn Jordan	
1985	Cocoon	Ron Howard	
1985	American Flyers	John Badham	
1986	Gung Ho	Ron Howard	
1986	Star Trek IV: The Voyage Home	Leonard Nimoy	
1987	Planes, Trains and Automobiles	John Hughes	
1988	She's Having a Baby	John Hughes	
1989	She's Out of Control	Stan Dragoti	
1991	Point Break	Kathryn Bigelow	
1992	Mr. Saturday Night	Billy Crystal	
1993	Addams Family Values	Barry Sonnenfeld	
1994	Speechless	Ron Underwood	
1995	Get Shorty	Barry Sonnenfeld	
1997	Men in Black	Barry Sonnenfeld	
1998	Mighty Joe Young	Ron Underwood	With Oliver Wood
2000	How the Grinch Stole Christmas	Ron Howard	

Television

Year	Title	Director	Note
1974	Kolchak: The Night Stalker	Allen Baron	Episode "The Ripper"

Documentary

Year	Title	Director	Notes
1973	The Far Sound	Jerry London	Documentary short
1979	UFOs: Past, Present, and Future	Ray Rivas	With Stan Laza

== Accolades ==
Academy Awards

Year	Category	Title	Result
1983	Best Cinematography	Flashdance	Nominated
1986	Best Cinematography	Star Trek IV: The Voyage Home	Nominated

American Society of Cinematographers

Year	Category	Title	Result
1986	Outstanding Achievement in Cinematography	Star Trek IV: The Voyage Home	Nominated
