= Robert Buckley =

American actor (born 1981)

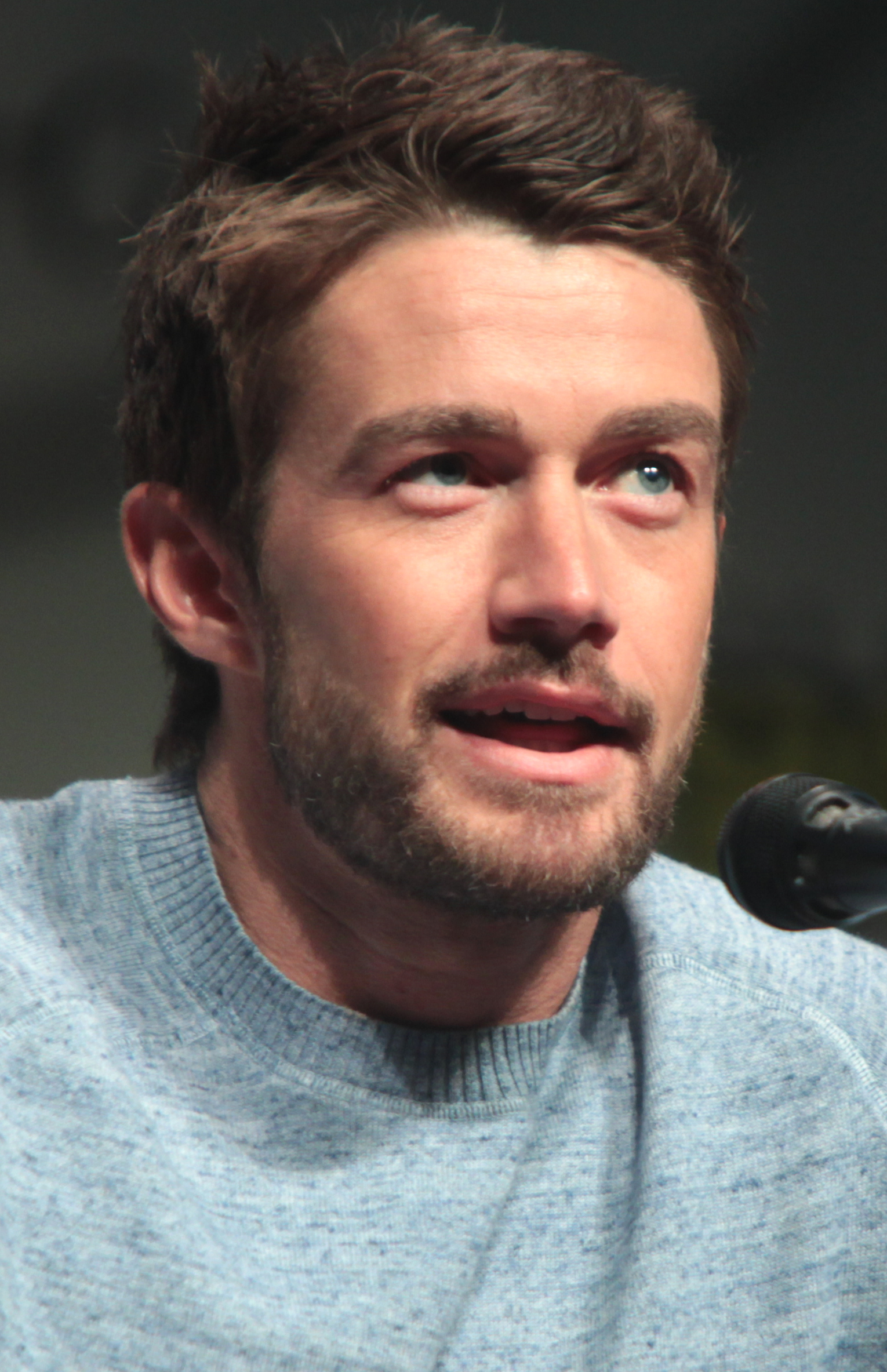
- Buckley at WonderCon in April 2015
- Born: Robert Earl Buckley; May 2, 1981 (age 45); Claremont, California, U.S.
- Education: University of California, San Diego (BS)
- Occupations: Actor; model
- Years active: 2006–present
- Spouse: Jenny Wade (m. 2018)
- Children: 2

Robert Earl Buckley (born May 2, 1981) is an American actor, known for his roles as Kirby Atwood on the NBC dramedy series Lipstick Jungle, Clay Evans on The CW drama series One Tree Hill, Brian Leonard on the ABC horror-drama series 666 Park Avenue, Major Lilywhite on The CW dramedy series iZombie, and Evan Kincaid on the Hallmark Channel drama series Chesapeake Shores.

== Early life ==
Buckley was born in Claremont in Los Angeles County, California. He earned a degree in economics from the University of California, San Diego, graduating in 2003. As a college student, Buckley appeared as a contestant on The Price Is Right. After working for a year as an economic consultant, he moved back to Los Angeles to pursue a career in acting.

== Career ==
In 2006, Buckley made his acting debut as a series regular on the MyNetworkTV primetime telenovela Fashion House, playing the role of Michael Bauer. Buckley then made his feature film debut in the horror When a Killer Calls, released in February 2006. He subsequently joined the cast of another MyNetworkTV telenovela, portraying the role of Matthew Wakefield in American Heiress. In 2007, Buckley guest starred on an episode of Ghost Whisperer. Also in 2007, he was cast in the recurring role of Kirby Atwood on NBC's comedy-drama series Lipstick Jungle.

The following year, Buckley signed on to play surf instructor Kyle Hamilton in the Lifetime film Flirting with Forty, alongside Heather Locklear. He then co-starred as Nik in the horror comedy Killer Movie, alongside Kaley Cuoco, Leighton Meester, and Paul Wesley, which premiered at the Tribeca Film Festival in April 2008. In 2009, The CW announced that Buckley would appear in a two-episode guest arc on the comedy-drama series Privileged as David Besser.

In June 2009, it was announced that Buckley had signed to star as a series regular on The CW's teen drama series One Tree Hill. He played the role of sports agent Clay Evans and remained with One Tree Hill until the series' ending in April 2012. In February 2010, Buckley was reported to be in the running for the title role in Marvel's Captain America: The First Avenger, but the part ultimately went to Chris Evans.

From 2012 to 2013, Buckley starred in the short-lived horror drama series 666 Park Avenue, portraying struggling playwright Brian Leonard who moves into a haunted building with his wife. In 2013, he was cast in a two-episode guest arc on season three of The CW's comedy-drama series Hart of Dixie. The following year, he co-starred in the Veronica Mars web spin-off series Play It Again, Dick, featuring Ryan Hansen in the central role. In 2015, he began starring as Major Lilywhite on The CW's comedy-drama horror series iZombie. In June 2016, Buckley was cast to star in the first episode of the Hulu anthology series Dimension 404, alongside Lea Michele and Joel McHale.

In 2021, Buckley joined the cast of the Hallmark Channel drama series Chesapeake Shores, playing the role of Evan Kincaid.

== Personal life ==
In May 2018, Buckley married actress Jenny Wade. They have two children together.

== Filmography ==
=== Film ===
| Year | Title | Role | Notes |
|---|---|---|---|
| 2006 | When a Killer Calls | Matt | Direct-to-video |
| 2006 | Petrified | Agent Tanner | Direct-to-video |
| 2006 | Capturing Q | Dillon | Short film |
| 2007 | Archer House | Lance | Short film |
| 2008 | Killer Movie | Nik | |
| 2011 | The Legend of Hell's Gate: An American Conspiracy | Bacas Mitchell | |
| 2011 | Z | Wyatt | Short film |

=== Television ===
| Year | Title | Role | Notes |
|---|---|---|---|
| 2006 | Fashion House | Michael Bauer | Main role |
| 2007 | American Heiress | Matthew Wakefield | Main role |
| 2007 | Ghost Whisperer | Brandon Bishop | Episode: "Unhappy Medium" |
| 2008–2009 | Lipstick Jungle | Kirby Atwood | Main role |
| 2008 | Flirting with Forty | Kyle Hamilton | Television film |
| 2009 | Privileged | David Besser | 2 episodes |
| 2009–2012 | One Tree Hill | Clay Evans | Main role (seasons 7–9) |
| 2012–2013 | 666 Park Avenue | Brian Leonard | Main role |
| 2013–2014 | Hart of Dixie | Peter | 2 episodes |
| 2014 | Play It Again, Dick | Gaston | 4 episodes |
| 2015–2019 | iZombie | Major Lilywhite | Main role |
| 2017 | Powerless | Dan | Episode: "Emily Dates a Henchman" |
| 2017 | Dimension 404 | Adam | Episode: "Matchmaker" |
| 2018 | The Christmas Contract | Jack | Television film |
| 2020 | Love in Store | David Crabtree | Television film |
| 2020 | The Christmas House | Mike Mitchell | Television film |
| 2021–2022 | Chesapeake Shores | Evan Kincaid | Series regular, fifth and sixth seasons |
| 2021 | The Christmas House 2: Deck Those Halls | Mike Mitchell | Television film |
| 2024 | Blind Date Book Club | Graham Sterling | Television film |
| 2024 | 'Twas the Date Before Christmas | Bryan | Television film |
| 2025 | An Unexpected Valentine | Finn | Television film |
