= Hadley's Rebellion =

1983 film by Fred Walton

- Directed by: Fred Walton
- Written by: Fred Walton
- Produced by: Steve Feke
- Starring: Griffin O'Neal; William Devane; Charles Durning; Adam Baldwin
- Cinematography: David Golia
- Edited by: Sam Vitale
- Music by: Mike Post
- Production company: East India Trading Company
- Distributed by: ADI Marketing
- Release date: October 1983
- Running time: 96 minutes
- Country: United States
- Language: English

Hadley's Rebellion is a 1983 American drama film directed and co-written by Fred Walton (with Steve Feke).

== Plot ==
A small town youngster's passion for wrestling is not matched by those around him at a California prep school.

== Cast ==
- Griffin O'Neal as Hadley Hickman
- William Devane as Coach Ball
- Charles Durning as Sam Crawford
- Adam Baldwin as Bobo McKenzie
- Lisa Lucas as Linda Johnson
- Eric Boles as Mr. Stevens
- Chad McQueen as Rick Stanton
