= Reventó =

1985 studio album by Héctor Lavoe

Studio album by Héctor Lavoe
- Released: 1985
- Genre: Salsa
- Label: Fania
- Producer: Jerry Masucci / Puchi Lavoe

Héctor Lavoe chronology
Que Sentimiento! (1981)	Reventó (1985)	Strikes Back (1987)

Reventó (It Burst) is the eighth solo album by salsa singer Héctor Lavoe. It was released in 1985 under the label of Fania Records. It was produced by Jerry Masucci and Puchi Lavoe.

== Reception ==
Reventó has been called "a solid album in the classic New York salsa style". According to Lavoe's biographer Marc Shapiro, the album was critically acclaimed upon release, although "it was not hailed as a landmark or breakthrough Héctor Lavoe album"; he goes on to say that it further established Lavoe as a talented, legitimate singer.

Revento entered the Billboard Top Latin Albums chart (New York) on 15 June 1985 at position 12; it stayed in the charts until November that year.

== Track listing ==
1. "De Qué Tamaño Es Tu Amor" – 3:33
2. "La Vida Es Bonita" – 4:11
3. "Don Fulano de Tal" – 3:46
4. "La Fama" – 5:20
5. "Déjala Que Siga" – 6:27
6. "Cáncer" – 6:53
7. "¿Por Qué No Puedo Ser Feliz?" – 4:23

== Personnel ==
- Héctor Lavoe (lead vocals, backing vocals)
- Joe Torres, Isidro Infante (piano)
- Sal Cuevas (bass)
- Milton Cardona (congas, backing vocals)
- Pablo Rosario (bongo)
- John Andrews (timbales)
- Lewis Kahn, Leo Pineda (trombone)
- Héctor Casanova (maracas)
- Johnny Pacheco (güiro, flute solo in "Déjala que siga")
- Mario Andreola (guitar)
- Richie Ray (piano solo in "Cáncer")
- José Mangual (backing vocals)
- Brenda Feliciano (Coro in "La vida es bonita"),
- Juan Viloria Villarman "Juancho" (Coro in "¿Por qué no puedo ser feliz?")

Technical

- Jerry Masucci (production)
- Puchi Lavoe (production)
