= The Lonely Villa =

1909 film directed by D. W. Griffith

- Play film; runtime 00:11:41
- Directed by: D. W. Griffith
- Written by: Mack Sennett
- Based on: Au Telephone by André de Lorde
- Starring: David Miles
- Cinematography: G. W. Bitzer; Arthur Marvin
- Distributed by: Biograph Company
- Release date: June 10, 1909
- Running time: 12 minutes
- Country: United States
- Language: Silent (English intertitles)

The Lonely Villa is a 1909 American short silent crime drama film directed by D. W. Griffith and starring David Miles, Florence Lawrence, and Mary Pickford in one of her first film roles. It is based on the 1901 French play Au Téléphone (At the Telephone) by André de Lorde. A print of The Lonely Villa survives and is currently in the public domain. The Lonely Villa was produced by the Biograph Company. It was released on June 10, 1909, along with another D. W. Griffith split-reel film, A New Trick.

== Plot ==
Three burglars check out a house. One of them then delivers a fake letter summoning the house's owner, Mr. Cullison. Before he leaves, Cullison gives his wife a pistol, but the crook manages to unload it unnoticed. The butler and a maid receive time off, and Cullison is driven away by his chauffeur, apparently leaving the wife and three daughters all alone.

The crooks break down the front door using a crowbar. Mrs. Cullison and her daughters flee to a room, lock the door and barricade it. Meanwhile, the man's car breaks down. He takes the opportunity to use the telephone at an inn to call his wife. She tells him what is going on. He borrows a horse-drawn wagon from gypsies, and he, a policeman and two men from the inn gallop to his home. When the robbers break down the second door, the family take refuge in a third room, but the burglars soon get in. One tries to open a safe, while a second rips a necklace off the woman's neck. Just then, the rescuers arrive and save the day.

== Cast ==
- David Miles as Robert Cullison
- Florence Lawrence as Mrs. Robert Cullison
- Mary Pickford as The Eldest Cullison Daughter
- Gladys Egan as The Youngest Cullison Daughter
- Adele DeGarde as The Second Eldest Cullison Daughter
- Charles Avery as Guest at the Inn
- Clara T. Bracy
- John R. Cumpson at the inn
- Robert Harron
- Anita Hendrie as The Maid
- Arthur V. Johnson at the inn
- James Kirkwood as Among Rescuers
- Violet Mersereau at the inn
- Owen Moore as A Burglar
- Anthony O'Sullivan as A Burglar
- Frank Powell
- Herbert Prior as A Burglar
- Mack Sennett as The Butler/A Policeman

== Production ==
Filming took place on April 29–30 and May 4, 6 and 14, 1909, in Fort Lee, New Jersey, and at Biograph's studio in New York City.

Griffith used cross-cutting to create tension. A series of alternating shots depicts the mother desperately defending her children from intruders, with shots of the frantic father returning at high speed to reach his imperiled family. Griffith, by incrementally shortening the length of each cross-cut "heightened the excitement" of the event. (Note: Film historian Arthur Knight is quoted by Gordon Gow in describing Griffith's early use of cross-cutting to create suspense, noting that it "heightened the excitement" of the scene.)

== See also ==
- D. W. Griffith filmography
- Mary Pickford filmography
- List of American films of 1909
- List of films featuring home invasions
