= The Sitter (1977 film) =

- Directed by: Fred Walton
- Written by: Fred Walton; Steve Feke
- Produced by: Steve Feke
- Starring: Lucia Stralser; Curt Sanders; Karen Kondan; Bill Striglos; Ed Ruffalo
- Cinematography: Willy Kurant
- Edited by: Sam Vitale
- Music by: Jane McNealy
- Production company: Parnassus Productions
- Release date: 1977
- Running time: 21 minutes
- Language: English
- Budget: $12,000

The Sitter is a 1977 American short horror-thriller film directed by Fred Walton on which his 1979 feature film When a Stranger Calls is based. It is a suspenseful retelling of the classic urban legend of "The babysitter and the man upstairs" about a babysitter who is menaced by mysterious and frightening phone calls.

== Plot ==
On the evening of March 21, 1972 in Santa Monica, California, a teenage girl named Jill Johnson is babysitting the children of Dr. Mandrakis at his house. The children have been put to bed upstairs and Jill is downstairs in the living room doing her homework. She receives a telephone call from a man who asks her if she has checked the children. Jill dismisses the call and goes back to her homework. The anonymous caller dials back several times. Eventually Jill calls the police, who instruct her to keep the caller on the line long enough for them to trace the call. After the stranger calls again, the police return her call, advising Jill to leave immediately because the calls are coming from a phone inside the house. Jill runs to the door as a light comes on at the top of the staircase, and the stalker's shadow appears. The scene segues to a close-up of a detective who is investigating the matter. A policeman explains to the detective that Jill is unharmed, but the children were murdered by the killer several hours earlier.

== Cast ==
- Lucia Stralser as Jill Johnson
- Curt Sanders as The Killer
- Karen Kondan as Mrs. Mandrakis
- Bill Striglos as Dr. Mandrakis
- Ed Ruffalo as Sgt. Sacker
- Sally Taylor as Nancy
- Bob Sutton as Detective
- Charles Boswell as Policeman

== Production ==
In early 1977, Fred Walton and his old college friend Steve Feke were throwing around story ideas for a film and Feke told him the legendary tale of "The babysitter and the man upstairs" which Walton felt had potential for a film. The production of The Sitter was made on a low budget with both Feke and Walton working steadily for the financing, including their friends' contributing $1,000 here and there. The 22-minute film, shot on 35mm in three days in May 1977 on a budget of $12,000, closely prefigures the opening twenty minutes of When a Stranger Calls, now consistently regarded as one of the scariest openings in horror movie history.

== Release ==
Once post-production on The Sitter was completed, Walton and Feke realized that the market for short films wasn't nearly as good as they had both anticipated. Although major studios were not interested in the short film, they were able to land a one-week showing at a theatre for consideration at the 1977 Academy Awards to qualify a nomination for Best Live Action Short. The Sitter had a short theatrical run being screened before Looking for Mr. Goodbar at Mann's Village Theatre in Westwood, California. In spite of its good reception, the film did not get nominated for an Oscar.

Executive producers Barry Krost and Douglas Chapin had gone to the theatre to see Looking for Mr. Goodbar, and both were so impressed by The Sitter that they sold Mel Simon (a businessman and film producer) on the idea of expanding it into a feature-length film, which eventually became When a Stranger Calls.

=== Home media ===
For a long time, the short was completely unavailable to the public, as it had remained in Walton's possession the whole time. It was only finally released to the public when it was included as a special feature on the UK Blu-ray release of When a Stranger Calls (1979), and in the Shout Factory Blu-ray release of When a Stranger Calls Back (1993).
