= List of films featuring home invasions =

The Lonely Villa (1909), a silent short film featuring a home invasion

In Suddenly (1954), Frank Sinatra plays an assassin who takes over a family's home as a venue to target the President of the United States.

There is a body of films that feature home invasions. Paula Marantz Cohen says, "Such films reflect an increased fear of the erosion of distinctions between private and public space... These films also reflect a sense that the outside world is more dangerous and unpredictable than ever before." Home invasion films are commonly thrillers and horror films. The home invasion subgenre goes as far back as D. W. Griffith's 1909 film The Lonely Villa.

This list only covers films containing actual or attempted home invasions, and does not include movies based around assaults on other places such as Assault on Precinct 13, which dealt with a police station being invaded, or intrusion under false pretenses, such as Orphan.

== List of films ==
Film	Year	Ref.
36 Ghante	1974	
388 Arletta Avenue	2011	
3615 code Père Noël	1989	
Absurd (Italian: Rosso Sangue)	1981	
The Aggression Scale	2012	
Alone in the Dark	1982	
The Anderson Tapes	1971	
Angst	1983	
As Good as It Gets	1997	
August Underground	2001	
August Underground's Mordum	2003	
August Underground's Penance	2007	
Bad Influence	1990	
The Bat	1926	
The Bat	1959	
Becky	2020	
A Better Tomorrow	1986	
Better Watch Out	2016	
Beware, My Lovely	1952	
Black Christmas	1974	
Black Christmas	2006	
Black Christmas	2019	
Blind Alley	1939	
Blood Simple	1985	
Blue Steel	1990	
Bone	1972	
Breaking In	2018	
The Cable Guy	1996	
The Call	2013	
Cape Fear	1962	
Cape Fear	1991	
Captain Magal	1993	
Cellular	2004	
Cherry Tree Lane	2010	
Child's Play	1988	
Child's Play	2019	
A Clockwork Orange	1971	
Clownhouse	1989	
Cold in July	2014	
The Collector	2009	
Corruption	1968	
Count the Hours	1953	
Creep	2014	
Crimewave	1985	
Crumb Catcher	2023	
Cul-de-sac	1966	
Curfew	1989	
The Dark Hours	2005	
The Dark Past	1948	
Deadfall	2012	
Deadly Virtues	2014	
Death Game	1977	
Death Sentence	2007	
Death Weekend	1976	
Death Wish	1974	
Death Wish II	1982	
Demon Seed	1977	
The Desperate Hours	1955	
Desperate Hours	1990	
Devil in a Blue Dress	1995	
Dial M for Murder	1954	
Disorder	2015	
Don't Breathe	2016	
Don't Say a Word	2001	
Dream Lover	1993	
Drop	2025	
The Dress	1996	
E.T. the Extra-Terrestrial	1982	
The Edukators (German: Die fetten Jahre sind vorbei)	2004	
Emelie	2015	
Extremities	1986	
Eye for an Eye	1996	
Fargo	1996	
Farmer's Daughters	1973	
Fatal Attraction	1987	
Fear	1996	
The Fear Inside	1992	
Fight for Your Life	1977	
Firewall	2006	
Five Minutes to Live	1961	
The Fugitive	1993	
Funny Games	1997	
Funny Games	2007	
Game Over	2019	
The Gift	2015	
Grotesque	1988	
Halloween	1978	
Halloween	2007	
The Hand That Rocks the Cradle	1992	
Hangman	2015	
Hannibal	2001	
Hate Crime	2012	
Heart and Souls	1993	
Hell High	1989	
Hellions	2015	
Henry: Portrait of a Serial Killer	1986	
He Ran All the Way	1951	
Hider in the House	1989	
High Tension	2003	
Home Alone (franchise) (Note: The family film lampoons the element of home invasion, which is more common in thriller films.)	1990	
Home Sweet Home	2013	
Hostage	2005	
The House on the Edge of the Park	1980	
Hush	2016	
If I Die Before I Wake	1998	
In Cold Blood	1967	
Incident in a Ghostland	2018	
Inside (French: À l'intérieur)	2007	
In Their Skin	2012	
Intruder	2016	
Intruders (Alternate Title: Shut In)	2015	
I Saw What You Did	1965	
I See You	2019	
I Spit on Your Grave	1978	
John Wick	2014	
Kala	2021	
Keep Watching	2017	
Key Largo	1948	
Kidnapped (Spanish: Secuestrados)	2010	
Kimi	2022	
Kitten with a Whip	1964	
Knock at the Cabin	2023	
Knock Knock	2015	
Kristy	2014	
Kung Fu Ghost	2022	
Lady in a Cage	1964	
Lady Stay Dead	1981	
Lakeview Terrace	2008	
Last House on Dead End Street	1977	
The Last House on the Left	1972	
The Last House on the Left	2009	
Law Abiding Citizen	2009	
The Lonely Villa	1909	
Malice	1993	
Man Bites Dog (French: C'est arrivé près de chez vous)	1992	
Manhunter	1986	
Martyrs	2008	
Martyrs	2016	
Masquerade	2021	
Mercy	2016	
Memento	2000	
Mischief Night	2013	
Mother!	2017	
Mother's Day	2010	
Nancy Nancy	2006	
The Neighbor	1993	
The Night God Screamed	1971	
The Night Holds Terror	1955	
Nobody	2021	
No Country for Old Men	2007	
No Good Deed	2014	
No One Will Save You	2023	
Obsessed	2009	
Once Upon a Time in Hollywood	2019	
Of Unknown Origin	1983	
Outlaws and Angels	2016	
The Owners	2020	
Pacific Heights	1990	
Panic Room	2002	
Parasite	2019	
Patriot Games	1992	
The Penthouse	1967	
The People Under the Stairs	1991	
The Perfect Guy	2015	
Play Misty for Me	1971	
The Plumber	1979	
Police Story	1985	
The Purge	2013	
Raggedy Man	1981	
Raising Arizona	1987	
Red Dragon	2002	
The Ref	1994	
Restraint	2008	
Rifle Club (film)	2024	
Rolling Thunder	1977	
Romper Stomper	1992	
Saw	2004	
Saw X	2023	
Scary Movie	2000	
Scream	1996	
Scream for Help	1984	
Season of the Witch	1972	
See No Evil	1971	
Signs	2002	
The Silent House	2010	
Silent House	2011	
Single White Female	1992	
The Sixth Sense	1999	
Skyfall	2012	
Sleep Tight	2011	
The Slumber Party Massacre	1982	
Sorry, Wrong Number	1948	
Southbound	2015	
The Spiderwick Chronicles	2008	
Static	2012	
The Stepfather	1987	
Strange Behavior	1981	
The Strangers	2008	
The Strangers: Prey at Night	2018	
The Strangers: Chapter 1	2024	
Straw Dogs	1971	
Straw Dogs	2011	
Suddenly	1954	
Supremacy	2014	
Survive The Night	2020	
Suspense	1913	
Sweet Savior	1971	
Swimfan	2002	
The Texas Chain Saw Massacre	1974	
Them (French: Ils)	2006	
To Make a Killing	1988	
There Goes the Neighborhood	1993	
Tiger House	2015	
Torso	1973	
The Town That Dreaded Sundown	1976	
Trespass	2011	
Unbreakable	2000	
The Uninvited Guest	2004	
Unlawful Entry	1992	
Us	2019	
Varathan	2018	
Vigilante	1983	
Violent Night	2022	
Visiting Hours	1982	
Wait Until Dark	1967	
When a Stranger Calls	1979	
When a Stranger Calls	2006	
When a Stranger Calls Back	1993	
White Settlers (Alternate Title: The Blood Lands)	2014	
Wolves at the Door	2016	
Wonderland	2003	
You're Next	2011	
Fender Bender	2016	
