= Que Sentimiento! =

1981 studio album by Héctor Lavoe

Que Sentimiento

Studio album by Héctor Lavoe
- Released: 1981
- Genre: Salsa
- Label: Fania Records

Héctor Lavoe chronology
El Sabio (1981)	Que Sentimiento (1981)	Vigilante (1983)

Que Sentimiento! (What a Feeling!) is a 1981 album by Héctor Lavoe. Fania gave Lavoe the go-ahead reluctantly, on what would be his first and only self-produced album.

== Track listing ==
1. "Amor Soñado" (Arreglos musicales por: Louie Ramirez) José Nogueras 5:35
2. "Lo Dejé Llorando" (Arreglos musicales por: José Febles) Sammy Ayala 4:44
3. "Juventud" (Arreglos musicales por: Louie Ramirez) Marcelino Guerra 2:15
4. "Yo Ta' Cansa" (Arreglos musicales por: Edwin Torres) J. Blanco y M. Guerra 7:37
5. "Soy Vagabundo" (Arreglos musicales por: Luis Cruz) Enildo Padrón 5:55
6. "El Son" (Arreglos musicales por: Luis "Perico" Ortiz) D.R. 6:04
7. "Seguiré Mi Viaje" (Arreglos musicales por: José Febles) Alvaro Carrillo 4:02
8. "No Hay Quien Te Aguante" (Arreglos musicales por: José Madera) Héctor Lavoe y Ramón Rodríguez 4:19
