= Charles Durning =

American actor (1923–2012)

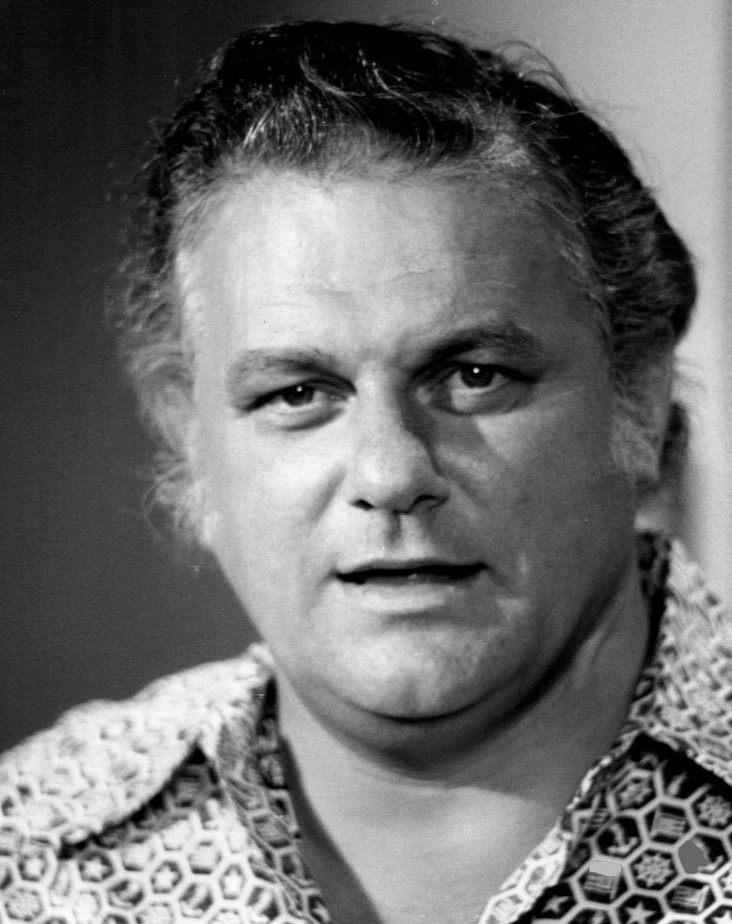
- Durning in 1975
- Born: Charles Edward Durning; February 28, 1923; Highland Falls, New York, U.S.
- Died: December 24, 2012 (aged 89); New York City, U.S.
- Resting place: Arlington National Cemetery; 38.8737°N 77.0641°W
- Occupation: Actor
- Years active: 1951–2012
- Spouses: Carole Doughty (m. 1959; div. 1972); Mary Ann Amelio (m. 1974; sep. 2010)
- Children: 3, including Jeanine
- Military career
- Allegiance: United States
- Branch: United States Army
- Service years: 1943–1946
- Rank: Private First Class
- Units: 1st Infantry Division, 100th Infantry Division
- Conflicts: World War II; Operation Overlord; Battle of the Bulge
- Awards: Silver Star; Bronze Star; Purple Heart; Good Conduct Medal; World War II Victory Medal

Charles Edward Durning (February 28, 1923 – December 24, 2012) was an American actor who appeared in over 200 movies, television shows and plays. He received various accolades, including a Golden Globe Award and a Tony Award, in addition to nominations for two Academy Awards and nine Primetime Emmy Awards. In 2008, Durning was awarded with Screen Actors Guild Life Achievement Award. His best-known films include The Sting (1973), Dog Day Afternoon (1975), The Muppet Movie (1979), True Confessions (1981), Tootsie (1982), Dick Tracy (1990), and O Brother, Where Art Thou? (2000). Prior to his acting career, Durning served in World War II and was decorated for valor in combat.

== Early life ==
Durning was born in Highland Falls, New York. He was the son of Louise (née Leonard; 1894–1982), a laundress at West Point, and James E. Durning (1883 – c. 1935). His father was an Irish immigrant, and his mother was also of Irish descent. Durning was raised Catholic. Durning was the ninth of ten children. His three brothers – James (known as Roger, 1915–2000), Clifford (1916–1994), and Gerald (1926–2000) – and his sister Frances (1918–2006) survived to adulthood, but five sisters died from scarlet fever and smallpox as children.

== Military service ==
Durning served in the U.S. Army during World War II. He was drafted at age 20. Durning landed in France as part of an artillery unit in one of the first waves of the D-Day invasion of Normandy. After being wounded by a German anti-personnel mine in the bocage, he spent six months recovering. Durning was reassigned to the 398th Infantry Regiment with the 100th Infantry Division, and participated in the Battle of the Bulge in December 1944. He was discharged at the rank of private first class on January 30, 1946.

For his valor and the wounds he sustained during the war, Durning was awarded the Silver Star and three Purple Hearts. He also received the Bronze Star because he had earned the Combat Infantry Badge. Additional awards included the Army Good Conduct Medal, the American Campaign Medal and the European-African-Middle Eastern Campaign Medal with Arrowhead device and two bronze service stars, and the World War II Victory Medal. His badges included the Combat Infantryman Badge, Expert Badge with Rifle Bar and Honorable Service Lapel Pin.

Durning received the French National Order of the Legion of Honor from the French Consul in Los Angeles in April 2008.

Badges and pins
Combat Infantryman Badge	Expert Badge with Rifle Bar	Honorable Service Lapel Button

Ribbons

Silver Star		Bronze Star
Purple Heart with 2 Oak leaf clusters	Good Conduct Medal	American Campaign Medal
EAME Campaign Medal (2x)	World War II Victory Medal	Legion of Honour (Chevalier)

=== Veteran groups and spokesman ===
Durning participated in a variety of functions to honor American veterans, including serving as Chairman of the U.S. National Salute to Hospitalized Veterans. He was an honored guest speaker for 17 years at the National Memorial Day Concert televised by PBS every year on the Sunday evening of Memorial Day weekend.

Durning was paid a special tribute at the May 26, 2013, National Memorial Day Concert when "Taps" was sounded in his honor.

== Acting career ==
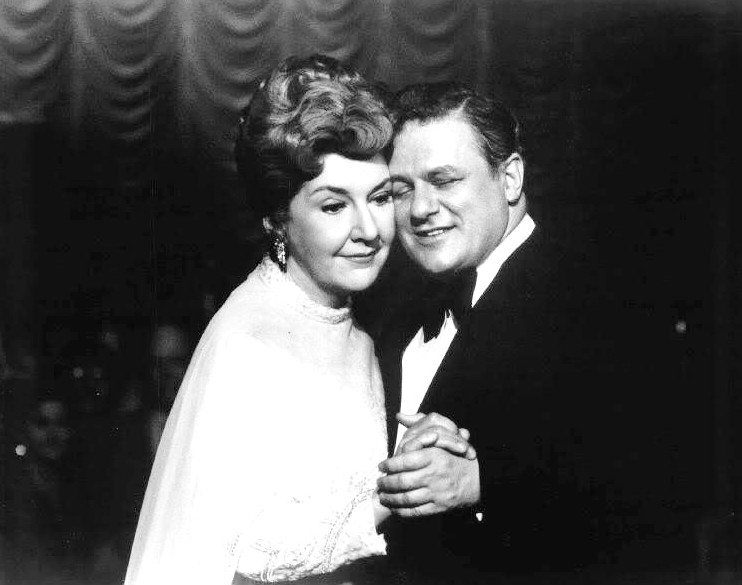
With Maureen Stapleton in the 1975 made-for-television film Queen of the Stardust Ballroom (each was nominated for an Emmy Award)

While pursuing an acting career, Durning, a professional ballroom dancer, taught at Fred Astaire Dance Studio in New York City.

Durning began his career in 1951. While working as an usher in a burlesque theatre, he was hired to replace a drunken actor on stage. Subsequently, he performed in roughly 50 stock company productions and in various off-Broadway plays, eventually attracting the attention of Joseph Papp, founder of The Public Theater and the New York Shakespeare Festival. Beginning in 1961, he appeared in 35 plays as part of the Shakespeare Festival. "That time in my life was my best time," Durning told Pittsburgh's Post Gazette in 2001. "I had no money at all, and he [Joseph Papp] didn't pay much. You were getting a salary for performance plus a rehearsal salary. We would do three plays in Central Park for the summer. And then you'd do three to six plays every year down on Lafayette Street – new plays by new writers: Sam Shepard, David Mamet, David Rabe, John Ford Noonan, Jason Miller."

During this period, he segued into television and movies. He made his film debut in 1965, appearing in Harvey Middleman, Fireman. He appeared in John Frankenheimer's I Walk the Line (1970) starring Gregory Peck, and three Brian De Palma movies: Hi, Mom! (1970, as Charles Durnham), Sisters (1973), and The Fury (1978). He also appeared in Dealing: Or the Berkeley-to-Boston Forty-Brick Lost-Bag Blues (1972) with Barbara Hershey and John Lithgow.

Durning's performances in Broadway productions include Drat! The Cat! (1965), Pousse-Café (1966), The Happy Time (1968), Indians (1969), That Championship Season (1972), In the Boom Boom Room (1973), The Au Pair Man (1973), Knock Knock (1976), Cat on a Hot Tin Roof (1990), Inherit the Wind (1996), The Gin Game (1997), and The Best Man (2000).

In 2002, he performed in Bertolt Brecht's The Resistible Rise of Arturo Ui with Al Pacino, produced by Tony Randall. He played the role of Jack Jameson in Wendy Wasserstein's final play, Third (2005), with Dianne Wiest at Lincoln Center's Mitzi E. Newhouse Theatre.

Durning won the Los Angeles Drama Critics Circle Award for his powerful performance in The Westwood Playhouse's 1977 production of David Rabe's Streamers. In 1980, he won critical acclaim for his performance as Norman Thayer, Jr. in Los Angeles's Ahmanson Theater's production of On Golden Pond opposite Julie Harris.

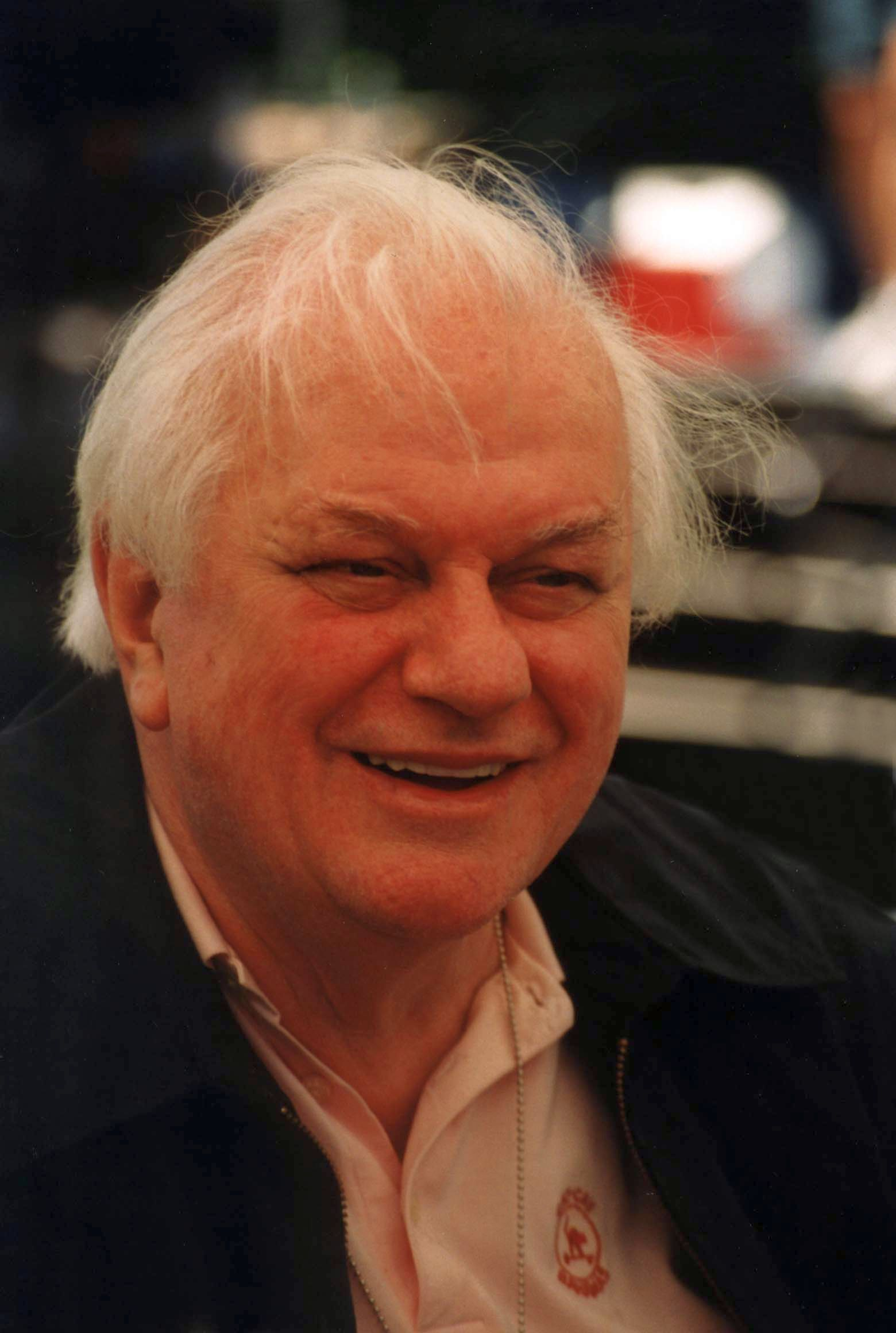
Durning in 1999

In 1972, director George Roy Hill, impressed by Durning's performance in the Tony Award- and Pulitzer Prize-winning play That Championship Season, offered him a role in The Sting (1973). In the Best Picture-winner, starring Paul Newman and Robert Redford, Durning won distinction as a crooked cop, Lt. Wm. Snyder, who polices and hustles professional con artists. He doggedly pursues the young grifter, Johnny Hooker (Redford), only to become the griftee in the end. Other film credits include Dog Day Afternoon with Al Pacino; When A Stranger Calls; The Final Countdown; The Hindenburg; Twilight's Last Gleaming with Burt Lancaster; True Confessions with Robert De Niro and Robert Duvall. Some television credits include The Connection; Queen of the Stardust Ballroom, the made-for-television musical in which he played the mailman who reaches out to Maureen Stapleton's lonely widow on the dance floor; Attica; PBS's Dancing Bear with Tyne Daly; the PBS production I Would Be Called John as Pope John XXIII; Hallmark Hall of Fame: Casey Stengel, in which Durning played the legendary baseball manager Charles Dillon "Casey" Stengel; NBC's mini-series Studs Lonigan with Harry Hamlin and Colleen Dewhurst; The Best Little Girl in the World with Jennifer Jason Leigh. In 1976, he received both an Emmy and a Golden Globe nomination for his performance in the television mini-series Captains and the Kings.

In 1979, he played Doc Hopper, a man who owns a frog leg restaurant and the main antagonist in The Muppet Movie. In Tootsie (1982), he played a suitor to Dustin Hoffman's cross-dressing lead character. The two actors worked together again in a 1985 TV production of Death of a Salesman. In 1990, he appeared as Chief Brandon in the film Dick Tracy.

In 1993, he guest-starred in the Sean Penn-directed music video "Dance with the One That Brought You" by Shania Twain.

Other film roles include Henry Larson, the benevolent father of Holly Hunter's character in Home for the Holidays (1995) and Waring Hudsucker in The Hudsucker Proxy (1994). He worked with the Coen Brothers again playing "Pappy" O'Daniel, a cynical governor of Mississippi (a character loosely based on the Texas politician and showman W. Lee O'Daniel) in the Coen Brothers' O Brother, Where Art Thou? (2000).

Prior to appearing in the Burt Reynolds TV series, Evening Shade, as the town doctor, Harlan Eldridge (1990–1994), Durning appeared with Reynolds in five films, beginning with 1979's Starting Over, followed by 1981's Sharky's Machine, 1982's Best Little Whorehouse in Texas, 1985's Stick and 1999's Hostage Hotel.

On TV, Durning had a recurring role on Everybody Loves Raymond as the Barone family's long-suffering parish priest, Father Hubley. He also played the voice of recurring character Francis Griffin, the religious zealot father of Peter in the animated series Family Guy. He appeared on the FX television series Rescue Me, playing Mike Gavin, the retired firefighter father of Denis Leary's character.

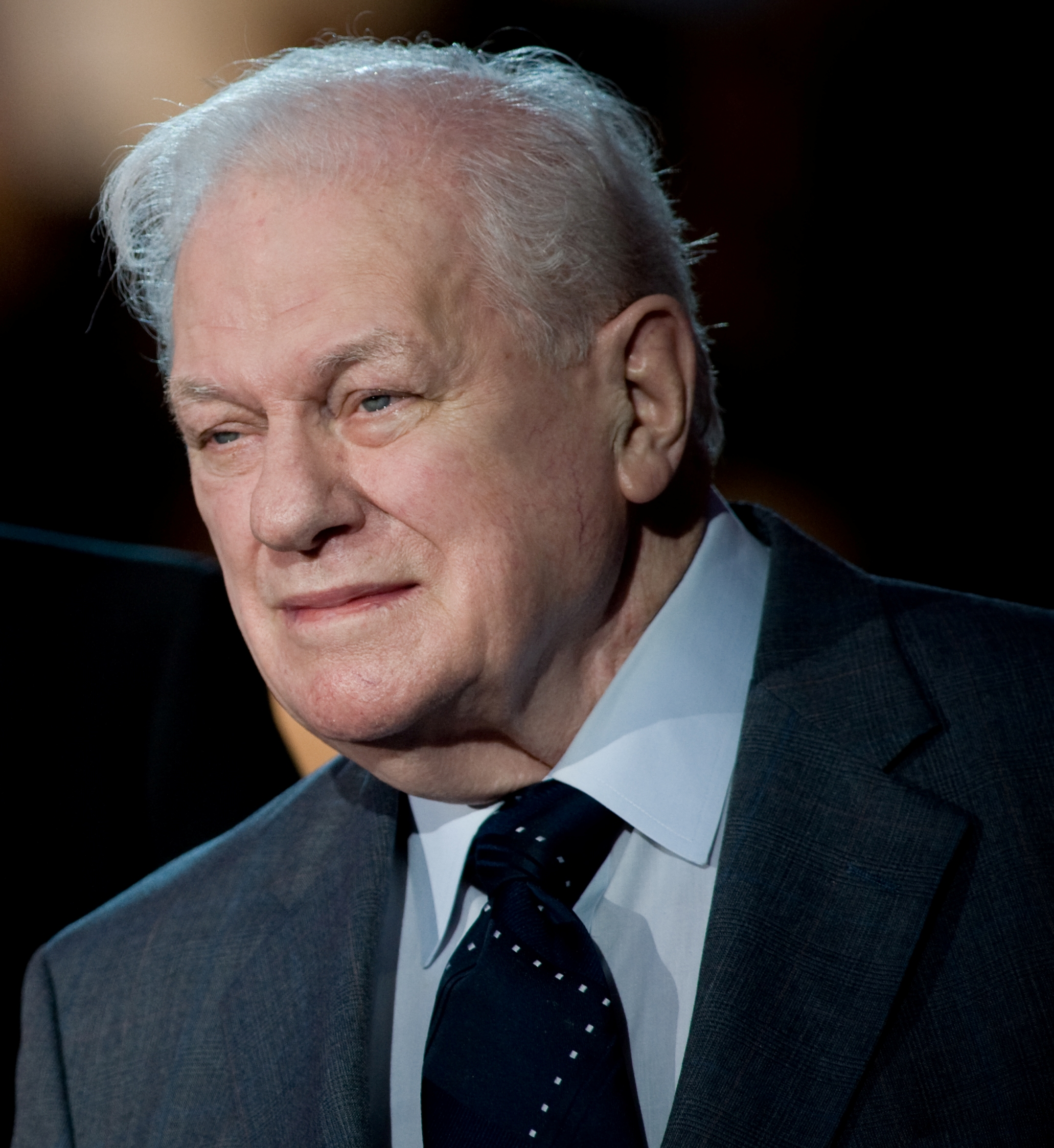
Durning in May 2008

In 2005, he was nominated for an Emmy Award for his portrayal of a Marine veteran in "Call of Silence," an episode in the television series NCIS, first broadcast November 23, 2004. Durning's character turns himself in to authorities, insisting that he must be prosecuted for having murdered his buddy during ferocious combat on Iwo Jima six decades earlier. The truth of the incident only becomes known when the guilt-stricken veteran goes through a cathartic reliving of the battlefield events.

For his numerous roles on television, he earned nine Emmy Award nominations. He also received Academy Award for Best Supporting Actor nominations for The Best Little Whorehouse in Texas in 1982 and To Be or Not to Be in 1983. He won a Golden Globe in 1990 for his supporting role in the television miniseries The Kennedys of Massachusetts, having had three previous nominations. That same year, he won a Tony Award for his performance as Big Daddy in Cat on a Hot Tin Roof. He received two Drama Desk Awards for his performances in That Championship Season and Third.

In 1999, Durning was inducted into the Theater Hall of Fame on Broadway. He was honored with the Life Achievement Award at the 14th Annual Screen Actors Guild Award Ceremony on January 27, 2008. On July 31, 2008, he was given a star on the Hollywood Walk of Fame adjacent to one of his idols, James Cagney.

"There are many secrets in us, in the depths of our souls, that we don't want anyone to know about," he told Parade. "There's terror and repulsion in us, the terrible spot that we don't talk about. That place that no one knows about — horrifying things we keep secret. A lot of that is released through acting."

The Charles Durning Collection is held at the Academy Film Archive. Along with films he appeared in, his collection consists mainly of films he admired as well as a small collection of family home movies.

== Personal life and death ==
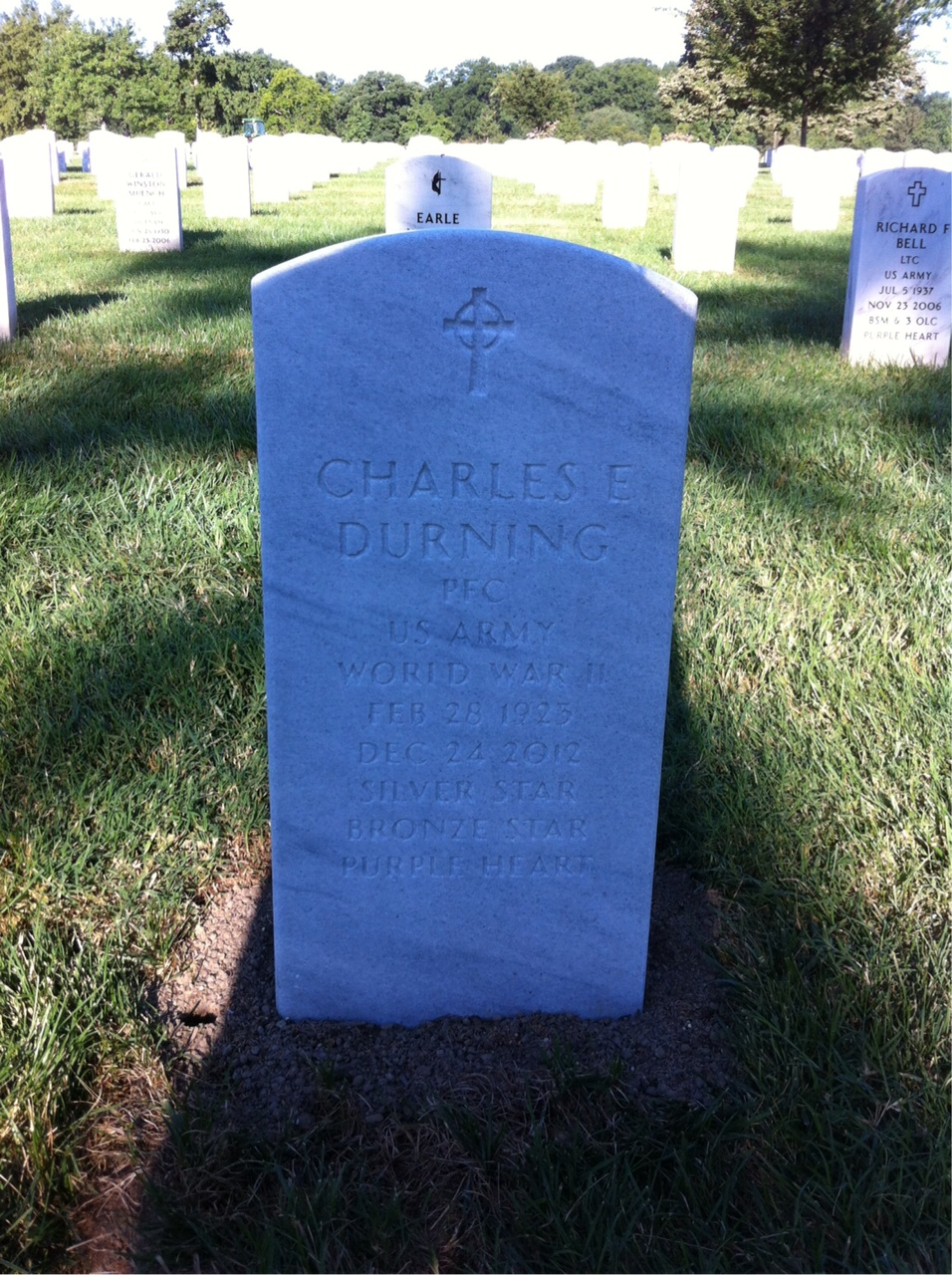
Grave at Arlington National Cemetery

Durning married his first wife, Carole Doughty, in 1959. They had three children together before divorcing in 1972. Durning married his second wife, Mary Ann Amelio, in 1974. In 2010, the two filed an official Declaration of Separation.

He died of natural causes at his home in Manhattan on Christmas Eve December 24, 2012, aged 89. He was buried at Arlington National Cemetery.

On December 27, 2012, Broadway theatres dimmed their lights in his honor. The New York Times referred to him and actor Jack Klugman, who died the same day, as "extraordinary actors ennobling the ordinary". The Huffington Post called them "character actor titans".

== Filmography ==
=== Film ===
Year	Title	Role	Notes
1962	The Password Is Courage	American G.I.	Uncredited
1965	Harvey Middleman, Fireman	Dooley	
1969	Stiletto	Cop	Uncredited
1970	Hi, Mom!	Superintendent	(as Charles Durnham)
1970	I Walk the Line	Hunnicutt	
1970	Sticky My Fingers... Fleet My Feet	Football Player	Short
1971	The Pursuit of Happiness	2nd Guard	
1972	Doomsday Voyage	Jason's First Mate	
1972	Dealing: Or the Berkeley-to-Boston; Forty-Brick Lost-Bag Blues	Murphy	
1972	Sisters	Joseph Larch	
1973	Deadhead Miles	Red Ball Rider	
1973	The Sting	Lieutenant Snyder	
1974	The Front Page	Murphy	
1975	Dog Day Afternoon	Sergeant Eugene Moretti	National Board of Review Award for Best Supporting Actor
1975	Breakheart Pass	O'Brien	
1975	The Hindenburg	Captain Max Pruss	
1976	Harry and Walter Go to New York	Rufus T. Crisp	
1977	Twilight's Last Gleaming	President David Stevens	
1977	The Choirboys	Spermwhale Whalen	
1978	The Fury	Dr. Jim McKeever	
1978	An Enemy of the People	Peter Stockmann	
1978	The Greek Tycoon	Michael Russell	
1979	Tilt	Harold 'The Whale' Remmens	
1979	The Muppet Movie	'Doc' Hopper	
1979	North Dallas Forty	Coach Johnson	
1979	Starting Over	Michael Potter	
1979	When a Stranger Calls	John Clifford	
1980	Die Laughing	Arnold	
1980	The Final Countdown	Senator Samuel Chapman	
1981	True Confessions	Jack Amsterdam	
1981	Sharky's Machine	Lieutenant Friscoe	
1982	The Best Little Whorehouse in Texas	Governor	
1982	Tootsie	Leslie 'Les' Nichols	
1983	Scarface	Immigration Officer	Voice, Uncredited
1983	Two of a Kind	Charlie	
1983	To Be or Not to Be	Colonel Erhardt	
1984	Mister Roberts	The Captain	
1984	Mass Appeal	Monsignor Thomas Burke	
1985	Stick	Chucky	
1985	The Man with One Red Shoe	Ross	
1985	Stand Alone	Louis Thibadeau	
1986	Big Trouble	O'Mara	
1986	Where the River Runs Black	Father O'Reilly	
1986	Tough Guys	Sergeant Deke Yablonski	
1986	Meatballs III: Summer Job	Pete	Uncredited
1986	Solarbabies	The Warden	
1987	The Rosary Murders	Father Ted Nabors	
1987	Happy New Year	Charlie	
1987	A Tiger's Tale	Charlie Drumm	
1987	Hadley's Rebellion	Sam Crawford	
1988	Cop	Detective Arthur 'Dutch' Peltz	
1988	Far North	Bertrum	
1988	Case Closed	Detective Les	
1989	Etoile	Uncle Joshua	
1989	Brenda Starr	Editor Francis I. Livright	
1989	Cat Chaser	'Jiggs' Scully	
1990	Dick Tracy	Chief Brandon	
1990	Fatal Sky	Colonel Clancy	
1991	V.I. Warshawski	Lieutenant Bobby Mallory	
1993	The Music of Chance	Bill Flower	
1993	When a Stranger Calls Back	John Clifford	
1994	The Hudsucker Proxy	Waring Hudsucker	
1994	I.Q.	Louis Bamberger	
1995	The Last Supper	Reverend Gerald Hutchens	
1995	The Grass Harp	Reverend Buster	
1995	Home for the Holidays	Henry Larson	
1996	Spy Hard	The Director	
1996	Recon	Chief	Short
1996	The Land Before Time IV: Journey Through the Mists	Archie The Archelon	Voice
1996	Mrs. Santa Claus	Santa Claus	
1996	One Fine Day	Lew	
1997	The Secret Life of Algernon	Norbie Hess	
1998	Shelter	Captain Robert Landis	
1998	Jerry and Tom	Vic	
1998	Hi-Life	'Fatty'	
1998	Hard Time	Detective Charlie Duffy	
2000	Lakeboat	'Skippy'	
2000	O Brother, Where Art Thou?	Pappy O'Daniel	
2000	Very Mean Men	Paddy Mulroney	
2000	The Last Producer	Syd Wolf	
2000	State and Main	Mayor George Bailey	Florida Film Critics Circle Award for Best Cast; National Board of Review Award for Best Cast; Online Film Critics Society Award for Best Cast
2000	Never Look Back	Unknown	
2001	L.A.P.D.: To Protect and to Serve	Stuart Steele	
2002	Turn of Faith	Philly Russo	
2002	Mother Ghost	George	
2002	Mr. St. Nick	King Nicholas XX	
2002	The Naked Run	Congressman Davenport	Short
2002	The Last Man Club	John 'Eagle Eye' Pennell	Short
2002	Pride & Loyalty	Dylan Frier	
2003	Dead Canaries	Jimmy Kerrigan	
2004	Death and Texas	Marshall Ledger	
2004	One Last Ride	Mr. Orlick	
2004	A Boyfriend for Christmas	Santa Claus	
2005	River's End	Murray Blythe	
2005	Resurrection: The J.R. Richard Story	Frank McNally	
2005	The L.A. Riot Spectacular	The Lawyer	
2005	Dirty Deeds	Victor Rasdale	
2005	Jesus, Mary and Joey	Teddy, The Bartender	
2006	Descansos	Innkeeper #2	
2006	Desperation	Tom Billingsley	
2006	Miracle Dogs Too	Captain Pete Weaver	
2006	Unbeatable Harold	Mr. Clark	
2006	Local Color	Yammi	
2006	Forget About It	Eddie O'Brien	
2007	Polycarp	Alexander Hathaway	aka Kinky Killers
2008	Good Dick	Charlie	
2008	Deal	Charlie Adler	
2008	The Drum Beats Twice	Satan	
2008	Break	The Wise Man	
2008	iMurders	Dr. Seamus St. Martin	
2008	The Golden Boys	John Bartlett	
2008	A Bunch of Amateurs	Charlie Rosenberg	
2009	Shannon's Rainbow	Floyd	
2010	Three Chris's	Kris Kringle	
2010	Chronicle of Purgatory: The Waiter	Frank 'The Handler' Maro	
2010	An Affirmative Act	Man In The White Suit	
2011	Naked Run	Congressman Davenport	
2011	The Great Fight	Judge Frier	
2011	The Life Zone	James Wise	
2012	Rogue Assassin	Frank 'The Handler' Maro	
2014	Scavenger Killers	Dylan Frier	Posthumous release
2015	Captured Hearts	Santa Claus	Posthumous release, (final film role)

=== Stage credits ===
Year	Title	Role(s)	Notes
1962	King Lear	Ensemble, Messenger from Cornwall	
1963	Antony and Cleopatra	Clown	
1963	The Winter's Tale	Clown	
1964	Fiddler on the Roof	Priest	Durning's role was cut during out-of-town tryouts
1964	Poor Bitos	Understudy	Broadway debut
1965	Drat! The Cat!	Pincer	
1966	All's Well That Ends Well	Lavatch	
1966	Measure for Measure	Pompey	
1966	Richard III	1st Murderer	
1966	Pousse-Café	Maurice / Dean Stewart understudy: Artie	
1967	The Comedy of Errors	Dromio of Ephesus	
1967	King John	James Gurney	
1967	Titus Andronicus	Narrator	
1968	The Happy Time	Louis Bonnard	
1969	Twelfth Night	Feste	
1969	Indians	Ned Buntline	
1970	Lemon Sky	Douglas	
1970	The Wars of the Roses	Part 1: Mayor of London; Part 2: Jack Cade	
1972	That Championship Season	George Sikowski	Drama Desk Award for Outstanding Performance
1973	Boom Boom Room	Harold	
1973	The Au Pair Man	Eugene Hartigan	
1976	Knock Knock	Cohn	
1990	Cat on a Hot Tin Roof	'Big Daddy'	Tony Award for Best Featured Actor in a Play Drama Desk Award for Outstanding Featured Actor in a Play
1992	Queen of the Stardust Ballroom	Al O'Hara	
1996	Inherit the Wind	Matthew Harrison Brady	
1997	The Gin Game	Weller Martin	Drama League Award for Distinguished Performance
2000	Gore Vidal's The Best Man	Ex-President Arthur Hockstader	Outer Critics Circle Award for Outstanding Featured Actor in a Play
2001	Brigadoon	Mr. Lundie	
2002	The Resistible Rise of Arturo Ui	Old Dogsborough / Ted Ragg / Ignatius Dullfeet	
2003	Harvey	Elwood P. Dowd	
2004	Golf With Alan Shepard	Ned	
2005	Third	Jack Jameson	Lortel Award for Outstanding Featured Actor

=== Television ===
Year	Title	Role	Notes
1953	You Are There	Colonel John Jameson	Episode: "The Treason of Benedict Arnold"
1963	Armstrong Circle Theatre	Clarence Hollis	Episode: "The Counterfeit League"
1963	The Defenders	Juror #11	Episode: "Judgment Eve"
1963	East Side/West Side	Dr. Markham	Episode: "Go Fight City Hall"
1966	Hawk	Police Announcer	Episode: "Do Not Mutilate or Spindle"
1967	N.Y.P.D.	Truck Driver	Episode: "Old Gangsters Never Die"
1968	N.Y.P.D.	Lawrence	Episode: "Naked in the Streets"
1970	The High Chaparral	Hewitt	Episode: "The Reluctant Deputy"
1972	Another World	Gil McGowan (#1)	Unknown episodes
1973	All in the Family	Detective	Episode: "Gloria the Victim"
1975–1976	The Cop and The Kid	Officer Frank Murphy	13 episodes
1975	Queen of the Stardust Ballroom	Alvin 'Al' Green	TV movie
1975	Barnaby Jones	Don Corcoran	Episode: "The Deadly Conspiracy: Part 2"
1975	Hawaii Five-O	Havens	Episode: "Retire in Sunny Hawaii Forever"
1976	Captains and the Kings	Ed Healey	3 episodes
1980	Attica	Russell Oswald	TV movie
1981	Crisis at Central High	Principal Jess Matthews	TV movie
1981	Dark Night of the Scarecrow	Otis P. Hazelrigg	TV movie
1981	Great Performances	McMahon	Episode: "The Girls in Their Summer Dresses and Other Stories"
1982	American Playhouse	Retired Man	Episode: "Working"
1985	Amazing Stories	Assistant to The Boss	Episode: "Guilt Trip"
1985	Death of a Salesman	Charley	TV movie
1985	Tall Tales & Legends	Uncle Doffue	Episode: "The Legend of Sleepy Hollow"
1986	Amazing Stories	Earl	Episode: "You Gotta Believe Me"
1987	Dolly	Musical numbers and skit	Episode 13
1987	The Man Who Broke 1,000 Chains	Warren Hardy	TV movie Nominated—CableACE Award for Best Supporting Actor in a Miniseries or a Movie
1989	The Butter Battle Book	Grandfather	Television special
1989	Dinner at Eight	Dan Packard	TV movie
1989	It Nearly Wasn't Christmas	Santa Claus	TV movie
1989	The Wonder Years	Grandpa Arnold	Season 3 Episode 12
1990–1994	Evening Shade	Dr. Harlan Elldridge	98 episodes
1990	The Kennedys of Massachusetts	John "Honey Fitz" Fitzgerald	3 episodes
1990	The Simpsons	Farmer John	The Call of the Simpsons
1991	The Return of Eliot Ness	Roger Finn	TV movie
1992	The Water Engine	Tour Guide	Television movie
1994	Roommates	Barney	Television movie
1996	Elmo Saves Christmas	Santa Claus	Television special
1997	Orleans	Frank Vitelli	3 episodes
1997	Early Edition	Psychiatrist	Episode: "A Regular Joe"
1998	Homicide: Life on the Street	Thomas Finnegan	Episode: "Finnegan's Wake"
1998	Cybill	A.J. Sheridan	2 episodes
1998–2002	Everybody Loves Raymond	Father Hubley	6 episodes
1998–2000	The Practice	Stephen Donnell	2 episodes
1999–2009	Family Guy	Francis Griffin	5 episodes
1999–2000	Now and Again	Narrator	20 episodes
2000	The Hoop Life	Wes Connelly	Episode: "The Second Chance"
2000	Early Edition	Judge Steven Romick	Episode: "Time"
2001	Arli$$	Unknown	Episode: "Fielding Offers"
2001	Citizen Baines	Clifford Connelly	Episode: "Three Days in November"
2002	First Monday	Justice Henry Hoskins	13 episodes
2003	Touched by an Angel	Father Madden	Episode: "The Root of All Evil"
2004–2011	Rescue Me	Michael Gavin	27 episodes
2004	NCIS	Corporal Ernie Yost	Episode: "Call of Silence"
2005	Detective	Max Ernst	TV movie
2006	Everwood	Eugene Brown	2 episodes
2007	Monk	Hank Johansen	Episode: "Mr. Monk Goes to the Hospital"
2010	No Clean Break	The Wise Man	Unsold TV pilot

== Major awards and nominations ==
Award	Year	Category	Work	Result
Academy Awards	1983	Best Supporting Actor	The Best Little Whorehouse in Texas	Nominated
Academy Awards	1984	Best Supporting Actor	To Be or Not to Be	Nominated
Golden Globe Awards	1976	Best Supporting Actor – Motion Picture	Dog Day Afternoon	Nominated
Golden Globe Awards	1977	Best Supporting Actor – Television Series	Captains and the Kings	Nominated
Golden Globe Awards	1984	Best Supporting Actor – Motion Picture	To Be or Not to Be	Nominated
Golden Globe Awards	1991	Best Supporting Actor – Series, Miniseries or Television Film	The Kennedys of Massachusetts	Won
Primetime Emmy Awards	1975	Outstanding Lead Actor in a Special Program – Drama or Comedy	Queen of the Stardust Ballroom	Nominated
Primetime Emmy Awards	1977	Outstanding Single Performance by a Supporting Actor in a Comedy or Drama Series	Captains and the Kings	Nominated
Primetime Emmy Awards	1980	Outstanding Supporting Actor in a Limited Series or Special	Attica	Nominated
Primetime Emmy Awards	1986	Outstanding Supporting Actor in a Miniseries or Special	Death of a Salesman	Nominated
Primetime Emmy Awards	1991	Outstanding Supporting Actor in a Comedy Series	Evening Shade	Nominated
Primetime Emmy Awards	1992	Outstanding Supporting Actor in a Comedy Series	Evening Shade	Nominated
Primetime Emmy Awards	1998	Outstanding Guest Actor in a Drama Series	Homicide: Life on the Street (episode: "Finnegan's Wake")	Nominated
Primetime Emmy Awards	2005	Outstanding Guest Actor in a Drama Series	NCIS	Nominated
Primetime Emmy Awards	2008	Outstanding Guest Actor in a Drama Series	Rescue Me	Nominated
Tony Awards	1990	Best Featured Actor in a Play	Cat on a Hot Tin Roof	Won

== Narrations ==
- Normandy: The Great Crusade Discovery Channel Director-Christopher Koch – English (1994)
