= Feliz Navidad (Héctor Lavoe album) =

1979 studio album by Héctor Lavoe (with Daniel Santos & Yomo Toro)

Studio album by Héctor Lavoe (with Daniel Santos & Yomo Toro)
- Released: 1979
- Genre: Salsa
- Label: Fania
- Producer: Jerry Masucci

Héctor Lavoe (with Daniel Santos & Yomo Toro) chronology
Comedia (1978)	Feliz Navidad (1979)	Recordando a Felipe Pirela (1979)

Feliz Navidad is the fourth solo album by Héctor Lavoe, with the contribution of Daniel Santos and Yomo Toro. It was released in 1979, under the label of Fania Records, and Johnny Pacheco was the Recording Director.

== Track listing ==
1. "Monserrate" - 3:23
2. "Mr. Brownie" - 4:23
3. "La Parranda Fania" - 4:42
4. "Joven Contra Viejo" - 4:13
5. "En la Navidad" - 3:21
6. "El Lechón de Cachete" - 3:43
7. "Una Pena en Navidad" - 2:54
8. "Dame Un Chance" - 2:49

== Personnel ==
- Héctor Lavoe - Vocals, Backing vocals
- Johnny Pacheco - Conga
- Milton Cardona - Conga
- Yomo Toro - Cuatro
- Prof. José Torres - Piano
- Sal Cuevas - Bass
- Luis Mangual - Bongo
- Jimmy Delgado - Timbal
- Ray Maldonado - Trumpet
- José Febles - Trumpet
- José Rodríguez - Trombone
- Papo Vázquez - Trombone
- Milton Cardona - Backing vocals
- Ramón Rodríguez - Backing vocals
