= When a Stranger Calls (2006 film) =

2006 American thriller film by Simon West

- Theatrical release poster
- Directed by: Simon West
- Written by: Jake Wade Wall
- Based on: When a Stranger Calls by: Steve Feke and; Fred Walton
- Produced by: John Davis; Wyck Godfrey; Ken Lemberger
- Starring: Camilla Belle; Brian Geraghty; Katie Cassidy; Clark Gregg
- Cinematography: Peter Menzies Jr.
- Edited by: Jeff Betancourt
- Music by: James Dooley
- Production companies: Screen Gems; TeleStranger Productions, Inc.
- Distributed by: Sony Pictures Releasing
- Release date: February 3, 2006
- Running time: 87 minutes
- Country: United States
- Language: English
- Budget: $15 million
- Box office: $67.1 million

When a Stranger Calls is a 2006 American psychological horror film directed by Simon West and written by Jake Wade Wall. The film stars Camilla Belle, Brian Geraghty, Katie Cassidy and Clark Gregg. Belle plays a babysitter who starts to receive threatening phone calls from an unidentified stranger, played by both Tommy Flanagan and Lance Henriksen. It is a remake of Fred Walton's 1979 film of the same name, which became a cult classic for its opening 23 minutes, which this remake extends to a feature-length film.

The film was theatrically released on February 3, 2006. It was panned by critics but was a financial success, grossing $67.1 million against a $15 million budget.

== Plot ==
Stacy, a teenage babysitter, receives a wrong number phone call during one of her nighttime babysitting jobs. The calls continue with heavy breathing on the other end. Police later arrive to find Stacy and the three children she was watching murdered.

Meanwhile, in Colorado, 125 miles away from the crime scene, 16-year-old Jill Johnson is babysitting for the wealthy Mandrakis family, as a consequence of exceeding her cell phone minutes. Mrs. Mandrakis shows her around and mentions their live-in housemaid, Rosa.

After the parents leave, Jill receives threatening phone calls from someone who mostly says nothing and then hangs up. She initially believes it is her friends playing a prank, but when she contacts them, they deny it. While the Mandrakis' two children are asleep upstairs, Jill's friend Tiffany visits. Fearing this may get her in trouble, Jill asks Tiffany to leave. Tiffany is ambushed by an unseen intruder while walking to her car.

The unknown person calls Jill, indicating he can see her. Alarmed, Jill calls the police, who say the call can be traced by keeping the caller on the line for at least sixty seconds. While waiting for the phone to ring, Jill sees a shadow moving in the guest house. Believing it is the Mandrakis' older son back from college, she investigates, but finds the guest house empty. While there, the unknown caller calls, convincing Jill he is watching her. She keeps him on the phone to trace the call, only to realize he has called a different line. Looking out the window, Jill sees a light has been turned on inside the Mandrakis' house.

Believing the maid, Rosa, is home, Jill searches for her, but finds no one. The phone rings again, and the caller remains quiet; Jill keeps him on the line for a minute so the call can be traced. Jill hears the shower running in the maid's room, but upon checking, the bathroom is empty. The police call her back saying the calls are coming from inside the house and she and the children need to get out. Horrified, Jill finds Tiffany's body on the bathroom floor and flees.

Jill finds the children hiding in their playroom. She sees the intruder in the loft. They escape into the greenhouse where Jill discovers Rosa's body under the water. The assailant enters and searches the greenhouse. Jill locks him inside, but he breaks out and attacks her. During the altercation, Jill turns on the fireplace to scorch the assailant's back then stabs his hand into the hardwood floor with a fireplace poker, then rushes out to find the police have arrived. The assailant is arrested.

Days later while recovering in the hospital, Jill is awakened to a popping balloon from a group of “get well” balloons floating at her ceiling. She tries calling the nurses station but gets no answer. She gets out of the bed and walks to the door and looks out, but she finds the nurses station and hallways are empty of people. Her room phone starts to ring, and she goes back in the room to answer it. While looking at her reflection in the mirror, the assailant appears behind and grabs her. She shrieks hysterically, waking from her hallucination as the doctors and her father try to stop her frantic panicking.

== Cast ==
- Camilla Belle as Jill Johnson, Will & Allison's babysitter
- Brian Geraghty as Bobby, Jill's boyfriend
- Katie Cassidy as Tiffany Madison, Jill's friend
- David Denman as Officer Burroughs
- Clark Gregg as Ben Johnson, Jill's father
- Derek de Lint as Dr. Mandrakis, Will & Allison's father
- Kate Jennings Grant as Kelly Mandrakis, Will & Allison's mother
- Tessa Thompson as Scarlett
- Madeline Carroll as Allison Mandrakis, Will's younger sister
- Arthur Young as Will Mandrakis, Allison's older brother
- Tommy Flanagan as The Stranger
  - Lance Henriksen as voice of The Stranger
- Steve Eastin as Detective Harv Hines
- John Bobek as Officer Lewis
- Brad Surosky as "Boom-Boom"
- Karina Logue as Track Coach
- Rosine Ace Hatem as Rosa Ramirez
- Escher Holloway as Cody
- Owen Smith as Police Officer
- Jessica Faye Helmer as Additional Police Officer
- Lillie West as Stacy (voice)
- Dianna Agron as Cheerleader

== Production ==
Screen Gems first announced production of When a Stranger Calls in August 2004, with Jake Wade Wall penning the script. Screen Gems had plans to release both a remake of the original film and a sequel titled When a Stranger Returns.

=== Casting ===
Evan Rachel Wood was offered the role of Jill, but turned it down. Camilla Belle was then approached and almost turned the role down due to her personal dislike for horror films but West, the director, convinced her that he was going more for a psychological thriller so she accepted. To prepare for the role, Belle had to do two months of weight-training and learning how to run. Belle was injured twice on the set; she struck a wooden bridge, cutting and scarring her hand, and also slammed her head against a glass window.

=== Filming ===
Principal photography occurred from January 1 to February 28, 2005, in California. Bellarmine-Jefferson High School was used to portray the high school seen in the film, and Signal Hill was used to portray the carnival. Running Springs was the filming location used for the road sequences. The house that was used in the film is located at Culver Studios in Culver City, California.

== Music ==
=== Score ===
When a Stranger Calls: The Complete Original Motion Picture Score

Film score
- Released: February 10, 2006
- Genre: Film score
- Length: 47:53
- Label: Sony BMG Music Entertainment
- Producer: James Dooley

When a Stranger Calls: The Complete Original Motion Picture Score, 15-instrumental songs composed by James Dooley, was released on February 10, 2006.

When a Stranger Calls: The Complete Original Motion Picture Score
No.	Title	Length
1.	"Main Title"	4:51
2.	"Fateful Drive"	2:57
3.	"The House"	3:43
4.	"Exploring"	5:16
5.	"Have You Checked the Children"	5:11
6.	"Tiffany"	2:55
7.	"Knock Knock Who There"	7:18
8.	"Curtain Call"	3:14
9.	"60 Seconds"	3:39
10.	"Inside the House"	4:12
11.	"Stranger"	3:48
12.	"Conflagration"	4:07
13.	"Police Station"	2:44
14.	"Lunatic Asylum"	3:58
15.	"End Credits"	2:42
Total length:		01:00:35

== Distribution ==
For the release of the film, AOL Instant Messenger ran ads beckoning users to IM Jill020306. When messaged, "Jill" (a Colloquis-style program) made small talk before panicking, as she received calls from a stranger asking her to check the children. She then gave the user her phone number (a toll-free 877 number) and asked them to call her. When users called, they heard an ad for the movie. Also, around the time of the DVD release, a new screen name appeared, Jill051606, to tie in with the DVD release date on May 16, 2006. It does not involve calling her, but instead she directs users to a video security system on the official DVD site where the shadow of the stranger passes by frequently.

As a marketing promotion for the film, a MySpace profile was created for Jill051606 featuring photos from the film. Users could add the profile as a friend, leave comments, and read Jill's blog.

=== Home media ===
The film was released on DVD and UMD on May 16, 2006. Special features include two audio commentaries (one with Camilla Belle and Simon West; the other with Jake Wade Wall), deleted scenes, a 20-minute making-of featurette, and trailers. A Blu-ray version of the film was released for the first time by Mill Creek Entertainment on October 4, 2016, in a triple feature with I Know What You Did Last Summer (1997) and Vacancy (2007). This disc contains none of the extras found on the DVD. This initial release was discontinued, and a new version was released by Mill Creek titled "Queens of Scream - Triple Feature" on February 5, 2019. The new release is virtually identical, with the only differences being a new cover on the case and the inclusion of a DVD copy alongside the Blu-ray.

== Reception ==
=== Box office ===
The film opened at number one with $21.6 million. It then made $9.1 million in its second weekend and $5 million in its third. The film went on to gross a total of $47.9 million domestically, and $19.2 million internationally for a total worldwide gross of $67.1 million.

=== Critical reception ===
When a Stranger Calls was critically panned. On the review aggregator Rotten Tomatoes, the film holds an approval rating of 8% based on 90 reviews and an average rating of 3.5/10. The website's critics consensus reads: "When a Stranger Calls ranks among the more misguided remakes in horror history, offering little more than a rote, largely fright-free update to the original." On Metacritic, it has a weighted average score of 27 out of 100, based on 20 critics, indicating "generally unfavorable reviews". Audiences polled by CinemaScore gave the film an average grade of "B−" on an A+ to F scale.

=== Accolades ===
In 2006, When a Stranger Calls was nominated to the Golden Trailer Awards in the category "Best Thriller".

== Possible sequel ==
Writer Jake Wade Wall discussed the possibility of a sequel in September 2020. His treatment would have the film be a remake of the second half of the original film, where Jill Johnson is older now and has a family and the killer has escaped the asylum, citing the success of Halloween (2018) as an inspiration.

== See also ==
- List of films featuring home invasions
- The Babysitter and the Man Upstairs
- When a Killer Calls (2006), a mockbuster of this film released by The Asylum.
