= When a Stranger Calls Back =

American Made-for-TV movie

- DVD cover
- Genre: Horror; Mystery; Thriller
- Based on: Characters created by Steve Feke; Fred Walton
- Written by: Fred Walton
- Directed by: Fred Walton
- Starring: Carol Kane; Charles Durning; Jill Schoelen
- Music by: Dana Kaproff
- Country of origin: United States
- Original language: English

Production
- Executive producers: Doug Chapin; Barry Krost
- Producer: Tom Rowe
- Cinematography: David Geddes
- Editor: David Byron Lloyd
- Running time: 94 minutes
- Production companies: Krost/Chapin Productions; The Producers Entertainment Group; Pacific Motion Pictures

Original release
- Network: Showtime
- Release: April 4, 1993

Related
- When a Stranger Calls (1979); When a Stranger Calls (2006)

When a Stranger Calls Back is a 1993 American made-for-television psychological horror film and a sequel to the 1979 classic When a Stranger Calls which reunites stars Carol Kane and Charles Durning (reprising their roles as Jill Johnson and John Clifford, respectively) with writer/director Fred Walton from the original film. It was originally broadcast on Showtime on April 4, 1993.

== Plot ==
Julia Jenz arrives at Dr. Schifrin's house for a routine baby-sitting gig. Soon after Dr. Schifrin and his wife leave, a mysterious man knocks on the door. The man tells Julia that his car is broken down and asks to come inside to use the phone. Julia refuses him admittance, but agrees to call the auto club. She finds the phone is dead. Afraid to divulge this detail, Julia lies and says that she called the auto club. The auto club never arrives, and the man returns repeatedly asking for help. Hoping he'll go away, Julia continues to lie, but the conversations gradually become sinister. Meanwhile, Julia notices things are not as they appear in the house and comes to understand that someone's in the house. At this time, Julia also discovers the children have been abducted. The intruder is seen in the house as she narrowly escapes. It is later revealed that the children Julia babysat were never found or heard from again.

Five years later, Julia is an introverted college student still traumatized by the incident. To make matters worse, strange things happen from time to time in her apartment, and Julia comes to believe that the children's abductor is stalking her. Jill Johnson, now a counselor at the college Julia attends, offers to help with the trauma of Julia's past experience as well as the current events taking place. Jill contacts the now-retired detective John Clifford to come to Julia's aid and help figure out who is stalking her. For protection, Jill helps Julia purchase a gun and teaches her how to use it.

Julia comes to believe the intruder is entering her apartment while she's sleeping and decides to stay with Jill until she feels safe to return to her own home. Having been through a similar situation years before, Jill and a reluctant John investigate the incident from Julia's past and conclude the stalker may be a ventriloquist capable of throwing his voice; he employed this skill to make it seem like he was outside when speaking to Julia during the original stalking incident when the Schifrin children were kidnapped. As they investigate, Jill and John receive news that Julia has shot herself in the head while at her apartment. She survives, but falls into a coma. Jill promises to find her stalker.

John eventually tracks down the children's abductor at a club where the latter performs as a ventriloquist, just as John hypothesized, but the perpetrator escapes. John tracks down the perpetrator's home, and there finds pictures of Julia in the hospital and Jill's apartment. Having returned to her apartment, Jill notices a carton of juice bearing the faces of the abducted children Julia babysat. Frightened, she arms herself and the offender begins to taunt her; he is seen wearing makeup that allows him to "disappear" from sight against Jill's apartment walls. He attacks and in the altercation, Jill is shot. John shows up just in time to shoot and kill the intruder.

Some time later, Jill is recuperating in the hospital where Julia is located and is wheeled to Julia's room to discover her out of her coma.

== Cast ==
- Carol Kane as Jill Johnson
- Charles Durning as John Clifford
- Jill Schoelen as Julia Jenz
- Gene Lythgow as William Landis
- Kevin McNulty as Dr. Schifrin
- Cheryl Wilson as Mrs. Schifrin
- Jerry Wasserman as Detective Brauer
- John Destry as Detective #1
- Bobby Stewart as Detective #2
- Terence Kelly as Medical Examiner
- Gary Jones as X-Ray Technician
- Duncan Fraser as Club Owner
- Babz Chula as Agent
- Jenn Griffin as Club Girl #1
- Rebeccah Mullen as Club Girl #2

== Release ==
=== Home media ===
When a Stranger Calls Back was released on VHS and DVD by Good Times Video on May 15, 2001. The film debuted on Blu-ray in the United Kingdom on December 17, 2018, in a limited collector's edition released by Second Sight. It included the first film and Walton's short film The Sitter as well as the score on CD and a 40-page book. The limited edition was followed by a standard edition from Second Sight, no longer containing the book or soundtrack.

The film was released on Blu-ray for the first time in the United States by Shout Factory on May 28, 2019. It includes a new 4K scan from the original camera negative, Walton's aforementioned short film, and interviews with the cast and crew.

== Reception ==
The film received mixed reviews, with praise going towards the performances of the cast and the opening and ending sequence, but similar to the first film, criticisms were aimed at the slower pacing of the middle act. Despite this, it received overall better reviews than its predecessor. On Rotten Tomatoes, the film holds an approval rating of 63% based on 8 reviews, with an average rating of 6.3/10.

Tony Scott of Variety gave the film a positive review, commending the film's acting, production design, direction, editing, and script. Brett Gallman from Oh the Horror stated that, while it was as good as its predecessor, it shared too many of the same flaws to be entirely successful. Dennis Schwartz of Ozus' World Movie Reviews graded the film a B−, calling it "a decent nail-biter that plays on the tension it builds up, despite its gaps in logic".

== See also ==
- List of films featuring home invasions
