= When a Stranger Calls (1979 film) =

1979 American psychological thriller film by Fred Walton

- Theatrical release poster
- Directed by: Fred Walton
- Written by: Steve Feke; Fred Walton
- Produced by: Doug Chapin; Steve Feke
- Starring: Charles Durning; Carol Kane; Colleen Dewhurst; Tony Beckley
- Cinematography: Donald Peterman
- Edited by: Sam Vitale
- Music by: Dana Kaproff
- Production company: Melvin Simon Productions
- Distributed by: Columbia Pictures
- Release date: September 28, 1979
- Running time: 97 minutes
- Country: United States
- Language: English
- Budget: $1.5 million
- Box office: $21.4–25 million (Note: Sources vary regarding the film's box-office gross: Box Office Mojo indicates a worldwide gross of $21.4 million, while data from the American Film Institute and other contemporaneous newspaper articles indicate a gross of $25 million.)

When a Stranger Calls is a 1979 American psychological thriller film written and directed by Fred Walton, co-written by Steve Feke, and starring Charles Durning, Carol Kane, Colleen Dewhurst and Tony Beckley (in his final film role). Its plot follows Jill Johnson, a young woman being terrorized by a psychopathic killer while babysitting, the killer's stalking of another woman, his returning to torment Jill years later, and a detective's trying to find him. Rachel Roberts, Ron O'Neal, Carmen Argenziano, and Rutanya Alda appear in supporting roles. The film derives its story from the folk legend of "the babysitter and the man upstairs".

The film was released in the United States on September 28, 1979, by Columbia Pictures. It was commercially successful, grossing $21.4 to $25 million at the box office against a $1.5 million budget, but it received a mixed-to-negative critical reception, with many praising the opening scene and performances, and others criticizing its writing and lack of scares.

The film has developed a large cult following over time because of the first 23 minutes, consistently regarded as one of the scariest openings in film history. The first 13 minutes of Wes Craven's Scream (1996) pay homage to the opening of When a Stranger Calls.

== Plot ==
Teenage babysitter Jill Johnson arrives at the home of Dr. Mandrakis and his wife, who inform her that their children are ill and asleep upstairs, requesting she try not to wake them. Throughout the evening, Jill receives a series of disturbing phone calls from an unknown man, who at first says nothing, later asks repeatedly if she has checked the children, and finally menacingly asks why she has not checked the children. Initially dismissing the calls as a prank, Jill grows increasingly frightened and contacts the police. Authorities eventually trace the calls to another phone line inside the house and urge Jill to flee immediately. Police rush to the home and apprehend the caller, a mentally disturbed merchant seaman named Curt Duncan, who had murdered the Mandrakis children shortly after Jill arrived. Duncan is committed to a psychiatric institution, while Jill is left deeply traumatized by the ordeal.

Several years later, Duncan escapes from the institution, prompting Dr. Mandrakis to hire John Clifford, a private investigator and former police detective who originally worked the case, to track him down. Assisted by his former partner, Officer Garber, Clifford becomes obsessed with apprehending Duncan and privately vows to kill him rather than see him recommitted. Meanwhile, Duncan begins stalking a woman named Tracy Fuller after an encounter at a bar. Clifford warns Tracy about Duncan’s violent past and convinces her to help lure him out, but their plan fails. Later, Duncan attacks Tracy in her apartment, having hidden in her closet, only for Clifford to intervene and pursue him through the streets of downtown Los Angeles before losing him.

Now married with children of her own, Jill has attempted to move beyond the trauma of that night years earlier. While out to dinner with her husband Stephen, Jill receives a chilling phone call from Duncan once again asking, “Have you checked the children?” Terrified, she contacts the teenage babysitter watching her children, only to discover they are unharmed. Learning of the incident, Garber tips off Clifford. Later that night, as Jill and Stephen prepare for bed, Jill hears Duncan’s voice inside the house. Attempting to wake Stephen, she instead discovers Duncan beside her in the bed. Duncan attacks Jill before Clifford arrives and fatally shoots him. Stephen is discovered alive but rendered unconscious inside their bedroom closet. As Clifford consoles Jill, Duncan’s lifeless eyes glare over the house.

== Cast ==
- Charles Durning as John Clifford
- Carol Kane as Jill Johnson
- Colleen Dewhurst as Tracy
- Tony Beckley as Curt Duncan
- Rachel Roberts as Dr. Monk
- Ron O'Neal as Lt. Charlie Garber
- Steven Anderson as Stephen
- Carmen Argenziano as Dr. Mandrakis
- Rutanya Alda as Mrs. Mandrakis

== Production ==
=== Development ===
When a Stranger Calls is an expanded remake of Fred Walton and Steve Feke's short film The Sitter (1977), which roughly comprised the first 23 minutes of this film. Walton and Feke alleged that they based The Sitter on a newspaper article detailing the harassment of a young woman who, while babysitting in Santa Monica, California, received phone calls from her attacker inside the residence.

The Sitter was released theatrically as a pre-screening short feature on a bill with Looking for Mr. Goodbar (1977). Executive producers Barry Krost and Douglas Chapin were so impressed by The Sitter that they acquired the rights and commissioned Walton and Feke to develop the short into a full-length feature.

=== Filming ===
The film marked cinematographer Donald Peterman's feature film debut as director of photography. Principal photography began October 9, 1978, and took place over 27 1/2 days at locations in and around Los Angeles, largely including the Brentwood neighborhood. The house which served as the location for the first act of the movie was at 321 S. Chadbourne Ave., in Brentwood. The Lockhart home in the final act was at 2722 Club Drive in Los Angeles. Both houses have been torn down. In November 1978, filming occurred in downtown Los Angeles during the Skid Row stabbing murders, and, by coincidence, used some of the sites where murder victims had been discovered, including the steps of the Los Angeles Public Library.

The downtown bar where Duncan and Tracy meet was Torchy's at 218 1/2 W. Fifth Street in Los Angeles. This location is the same bar that served as filming locations for the redneck bar in 48 Hrs. and for the 1985 version of Brewster's Millions. Filming was completed by mid-November 1978.

== Release ==
Columbia Pictures released When a Stranger Calls theatrically in the United States on September 28, 1979. Following successful box office receipts, Columbia re-released it to theaters in the fall of 1980, with screenings beginning in early October in the San Francisco Bay Area and Detroit, and on Halloween night in Miami and the Raleigh metropolitan area.

Carol Kane stated in an interview that while watching the film in the theater the audience began screaming and talking back to the screen during the opening 23 minutes of the film. Tony Beckley, who played Curt Duncan, died in April 1980, six months after the film's premiere. The 1993 sequel When a Stranger Calls Back was dedicated to his memory.

=== Rating ===
The American Classification and Rating Administration (CARA) voted unanimously for a PG-rating (five years before the PG-13 rating was available for use). However, CARA chair Richard Heffner then viewed the film and called the board for discussion to consider voting for an R rating. Although the theme of a film could be accommodated within a PG-rating, Heffner argued that this film's treatment of its theme was too unsettling for most parents to want it to be freely available to unaccompanied children. A majority vote was then received to assign the film its R rating.

=== Box office ===
The film had a gross of $482,969 from pre-release engagements. It expanded to 468 theaters and grossed $2,597,032 in its opening four days. It placed second on Variety's weekly box office chart for the week ended October 3, 1979 and moved up to number one in its third week of release. It grossed $20,149,106 during its initial theatrical run in the United States and Canada. In its 1980 theatrical re-release, the film grossed an additional $1,262,052. The film was a financial success, given its $1.5 million budget. Some contemporary newspapers note the film grossed approximately $25 million.

=== Critical reception ===
On Rotten Tomatoes, the film holds an approval rating of 38% based on 16 reviews, with an average rating of 5.21/10. On Metacritic, which assigns a normalized rating to reviews, the film has a weighted average score of 58 out of 100, based on seven critics, indicating "mixed or average reviews".

Roger Ebert described the film as "sleazy" in a 1980 episode of Sneak Previews. In her review for The New York Times, Janet Maslin wrote "When a Stranger Calls is an energetic first film", adding that "the frightened-babysitter opening of the movie is marvelously modern, as Mr. Walton demonstrates that a haunted house with an ice-making refrigerator is intrinsically scarier than a house without one. He also makes the most of that fearsome modern weapon, the telephone." Author Travis Holt elaborates on the importance of the telephone to the film's portrayal of horror, noting that in the beginning "The phone is presented as a means of safety and comfort; it is a savior rather than a burden." Once the harassing phone calls begin, however, the view of the telephone becomes more sinister:

With the constant central framing of the telephone and its intrusion into the tranquility of the house, the phone has become Jill's nemesis. Jill remains trapped in a situation where she can do nothing but pray that the perpetrator stops calling. The device that usually holds so much promise for positive communication has become virtually her worst nightmare.

Critic Elston Brooks of the Fort Worth Star-Telegram felt the film was superior to its contemporary Halloween (1978), adding that director Walton "keeps his tension-level at a nearly unbearable mark in the film's first half... He keeps it at a high dramatic level, thank to Durning and Beckley, in the second half, which is almost a second movie as far as plot goes."

=== Accolades ===
In January 1980, the film screened at the Avoriaz International Fantastic Film Festival in France, where it won the Prix de la Critique and the Prix Special du Jury awards, marking the first time a single film had won in both categories.

=== Home media ===
The film was released on VHS by Columbia Pictures Home Entertainment in 1981, and reissued in 1986.

A DVD release was distributed by Sony Pictures Home Entertainment on October 9, 2001, with the only supplements being bonus trailers. A Blu-ray version of the film was released by Mill Creek Entertainment in a double feature with Happy Birthday to Me (1981) on March 26, 2013. Neither film contains any special features on the disc.

The film was eventually released as a stand-alone on Blu-ray on February 11, 2020, by Mill Creek Entertainment with packaging designed to look like a VHS.

In the United Kingdom, Second Sight announced a special edition Blu-ray, which was released on December 17, 2018. The Blu-ray includes a brand new scan and restoration, plus the sequel When a Stranger Calls Back, a new scan and restoration of the original short film The Sitter, a reversible sleeve with new artwork by Obviously Creative and original poster artwork, as well as interviews with director Fred Walton, Carol Kane, Rutanya Alda, composer Dana Kaproff, the "limited edition" original soundtrack CD, along with a 40-page perfect-bound booklet with a new essay by Kevin Lyons. A standard edition without the soundtrack and booklet was released by Second Sight on July 1, 2019.

== Sequel and remake ==
A sequel, When a Stranger Calls Back, was broadcast on Showtime on April 4, 1993.

A remake was theatrically released on February 3, 2006.

== See also ==
- List of films featuring home invasions

== Sources ==
- Hutchings, Peter (2017). Historical Dictionary of Horror Cinema. Lanham, Maryland: Rowman & Littlefield. ISBN 978-1-538-10244-2.
- Olivier, Marc (2020). Household Horror: Cinematic Fear and the Secret Life of Everyday Objects. Bloomington, Indiana: Indiana University Press. ISBN 978-0-253-04659-8.
