= Fred Walton (filmmaker) =

American film director and screenwriter (born 1949)

- Born: 1949 (age 76–77); Maryland, U.S.
- Occupations: Film director, screenwriter
- Years active: 1977–1996

Fred Walton (born 1949) is an American former film director and screenwriter. Among his films are When a Stranger Calls, April Fool's Day, The Rosary Murders, I Saw What You Did, When a Stranger Calls Back and The Stepford Husbands.

Born around 1950, Walton was raised in Chevy Chase, Maryland. He graduated from Denison University, where he majored in theater. As of 2016, Walton resided in Portland, Oregon, where he has lived since the 1990s. He retired from filmmaking in 1996.

== Filmography ==
Short film

Title	Year	Director	Writer
1977	The Sitter	Yes	Yes

Feature film

Title	Year	Director	Writer
1979	When a Stranger Calls	Yes	Yes
1983	Hadley's Rebellion	Yes	Yes
1986	April Fool's Day	Yes	No
1987	The Rosary Murders	Yes	Yes

TV series

Title	Year	Director	Writer	Notes
1985	Alfred Hitchcock Presents	Yes	Yes	Segment "An Unlocked Window"
1986	Miami Vice	Yes	No	Episode "Streetwise"

TV movies

Title	Year	Director	Writer
1988	I Saw What You Did	Yes	No
1989	Trapped	Yes	Yes
1990	Murder in Paradise	Yes	No
1992	The Price She Paid	Yes	No
1992	Homewrecker	Yes	Yes
1993	When a Stranger Calls Back	Yes	Yes
1994	Dead Air	Yes	No
1995	The Courtyard	Yes	No
1996	The Stepford Husbands	Yes	No
