= Billy (Black Christmas) =

Fictional character in the Black Christmas film series

- Black Christmas character
- Billy (Bob Clark) in Black Christmas (1974)
- First appearance: Black Christmas (1974)
- Last appearance: Black Christmas (2006)
- Created by: Roy Moore; Timothy Bond; Bob Clark
- Based on: The babysitter and the man upstairs
- Portrayed by: Black Christmas (1974): Bob Clark; Albert J. Dunk; Black Christmas (2006): Cainan Wiebe (young); Robert Mann (adult)
- Voiced by: Bob Clark; Nick Mancuso; Mugsey Sweeny

In-universe information
- Alias: Black Christmas (2006): Billy Lenz
- Nicknames: Billy; The Caller; The Killer; The Moaner; The Sorority House Killer
- Species: Human
- Gender: Male
- Occupation: Stalker; Mass murderer Serial killer
- Family: Black Christmas (2006); Frank Lenz (father, deceased); Constance Lenz (mother, deceased); Agnes Lenz (half-sister/daughter, deceased); Unnamed stepfather (deceased)
- Nationality: Black Christmas (1974); Unknown (Note: While the film is set in Toronto, Ontario, no information on the character's nationality is mentioned.); Black Christmas (2006); American

Billy is a fictional character from the Black Christmas film series, first appearing in Black Christmas (1974) as a deranged murderer who taunts and kills a group of college students during the Christmas season. Created by Timothy Bond and A. Roy Moore, the character was partly inspired by the urban legend "The Babysitter and the Man Upstairs", in addition to the crimes of George Webster and the serial killer William Heirens.

Several members of the cast and crew portrayed and voiced Billy in the original film, such as Nick Mancuso, who performed the voices for the phone calls, while cameraman Albert J. Dunk performed Billy's POV shots and director Clark portrays both the villain's shadow and the phone voices. Neither the character nor his portrayers were listed in the end credits. In the years following the original film's release, fans and media outlets have often cited the character's name as Billy, and director Clark has himself referred to the character by that name in interviews.

Unlike later slasher film antagonists, Billy's true identity and motivations were intentionally omitted from the 1974 version of the film, which the filmmakers felt made him more frightening. Critics and art historians have stated that by leaving Billy enigmatic, it allowed the audience to place their own fears onto the character, forming their ideas about him and his motivations. While largely overshadowed by more popular horror or slasher film villains, Billy has also been identified by some critics and film historians as establishing many of the tropes that later became a staple of the slasher film genre, predating John Carpenter's Halloween (1978). He has been described by some writers as one of the greatest horror villains of all time and has been referenced in several other entertainment media.

== Appearances ==
=== Film ===
Billy first appeared in the original 1974 film Black Christmas as a mentally disturbed man known as "The Moaner", who regularly calls a local sorority house, leaving disturbing and obscene messages. During one such phone call, Barb (Margot Kidder), one of the sorority sisters, provokes him; he responds by threatening to kill them. The caller then goes on a killing spree, murdering most of the sorority house's inhabitants, including Barb. Jess (Olivia Hussey), the lone survivor, is attacked by Billy but manages to fight him off, and after discovering the corpses of Billy's victims in Barb's room, accidentally bludgeons her boyfriend Peter (Keir Dullea) to death, thinking he is the killer. The film ends with Billy, still alive, talking to the corpses in the attic, before making a final phone call to the house.

In the 2006 remake, his full name is William "Billy" Edward Lenz (Cainan Wiebe), and his backstory is prominently featured. Born with severe jaundice due to liver disease, he is physically and emotionally abused as a child by his mother, Constance (Karin Konoval). After murdering Billy's father along with her lover, Constance rapes Billy after she is unable to conceive a child with her lover, giving birth to Billy's sister/daughter Agnes (Christina Crivici). Billy later goes insane and murders his mother and her lover, disfiguring Agnes before being caught and sent to an insane asylum. Years later, an adult Billy (Robert Mann) escapes and goes on a rampage with Agnes (Dean Friss) at their old family home, which has been converted into a sorority house. After murdering most of the inhabitants, both Agnes and Billy are killed by Kelli Presley (Katie Cassidy), the sole survivor.

=== Literature ===
In 1976, Billy appeared in the novelization of the film written by Lee Hays. Hays based the novelization upon Moore's original draft, which expands upon Billy's actions, depicting inner dialogue, and alterations to key sequences. Another novelization was published in 1983 by Campbell Armstrong, under the pseudonym Thomas Altman. While Armstrong's novelization contains similarities to the original film, the plot and characters are considerably altered. In the novel, the mentally-challenged Billy Cole is partially based on Billy, although he is revealed to be a red herring to the actual killer.

== Concept and creation ==
=== Original concept and inspirations ===
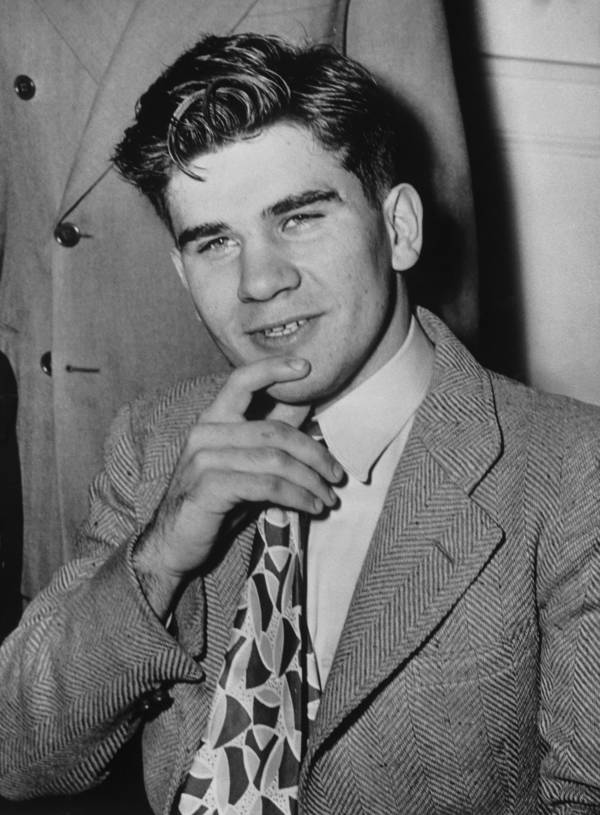
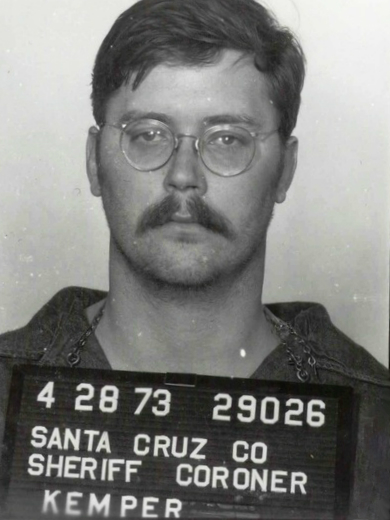
The crimes of serial killers William Heirens (left) and Edmund Kemper (right) served as inspiration for Billy in the 1974 film and its remake, respectively.

The original concept for Billy was created by Timothy Bond and Roy Moore, with further contributions to the character by Bob Clark. During the early 1970s, Bond and Moore sought to jumpstart their careers in the film industry by writing a horror film. Hearing stories of a babysitter who terrorized children in his care, Bond and Moore began writing the script. When developing the script, Bond and Moore used oral traditions and real-world events as a basis in crafting the character. A major source of inspiration was the urban legend of "The Babysitter and the Man Upstairs", (Note: Attributed to multiple references:) which itself is based on the unsolved murder of Janett Christman, who had been babysitting for the Womack family in Columbia, Missouri. (Note: Attributed to multiple references:) At the time of the script's development, the urban legend had become widespread in Canada and the United States, with slight variations depending on the region. The basic storyline describes a young woman who, while babysitting three children, is tormented by a madman who leaves threatening phone calls, later revealed to originate from upstairs in the house. The legend was the basis for other films, including the 1979 film When a Stranger Calls and its subsequent remake.

Additional inspiration was drawn from serial killer William Heirens, who left taunting messages in lipstick for one of his killings, and a series of murders that occurred during the 1943 holiday season in the Westmount area of Montreal, in which 14-year-old George Webster bludgeoned several of his family members to death and attempted to kill others. (Note: Attributed to multiple references:) Modern publications have described the crimes of serial killer and rapist Wayne Boden as an additional influence. (Note: Attributed to multiple references:)

==== Name ====
While commonly referred to by fans and some media outlets as Billy, (Note: Attributed to multiple references:) the character and his portrayer(s) are not mentioned in the end credits. (Note: Several media outlets have mistakenly reported that Billy was listed in the end credits as The Prowler, but neither the character nor his portrayer(s) are listed in the end credits.) Modern sources acknowledge Nick Mancuso as the primary voice of Billy, though he did not receive an actor's credit in the film as he was not a member of the actor's union at the time of production. The script credits him as "The Caller", while in the film, he is referred to by sorority sisters as "The Moaner". Several of the original film's cast members, including Clark himself, have referred to the character as either "Billy" or simply "The Killer" in interviews.

For the 2006 remake, he was formally named William "Billy" Edward Lenz and given a sister/daughter, Agnes.

=== Backstory and identity ===
Working on the script, then titled Stop Me, Bond and Moore created a detailed backstory for Billy to explain his identity and motivations. Bond comments that the character was "very well fleshed out in the sense that we knew his entire back story". As Clark states, Billy would have originated from a small town, where he either injured or killed his baby sister. (Note: Agnes and "the Baby" were mentioned by Billy in the original film, which Clark confirms is Billy's sister.) As Clark elaborates:

He was a disturbed child, and we got a lot of tension from his behavior, was probably jealous of his baby sister and created that schism between him and women. You could write a whole history on him if you wanted, there were enough dynamics, but we never really did.

Much of his ambiguity was intended from the outset, which Bond states that details of Billy were always meant to be subtle and never fully revealed. Once Clark joined the project, the script went through more rewrites which added more ambiguity to the character. Clark was adamant that Billy should remain as obscure as possible, feeling that he was more terrifying when the least amount of information was revealed about him. Though Billy is never fully revealed, (Note: Attributed to multiple references:) Clark left the subtle backstory for the character, in "his [Billy's] behavior and responses".

Clark worked closely with cameraman Bert Dunk to create shots that obscured the character as much as possible. This included using lighting techniques to "shape the shadows" cast by Billy, making him look slender in some scenes and burly in others to distort the audience's perception. Clark intentionally played upon the mystery of Billy's identity, creating the allusion that Claire's boyfriend Chris was Billy, only to reveal in the film's conclusion as a red herring, with Billy still at large. Nurturing the audience's suspicion that Peter was the killer, Dullea would perform certain actions to mirror Billy's. In many scenes, Peter is framed as a silhouette and kept off-camera during his phone conversations with Jess. Once distribution rights for the film were purchased by Warner Brothers, studio executives requested that Clark make significant changes to the killer's identity, as they disliked the film's ambiguous conclusion. During preparation in 1975 for the film's American release, studio executives suggested that Clark alter the film's ending to reveal the identity as Chris in a proposed scene where Chris appears in front of Jess, the film's final girl, telling her to "[not] tell Agnes what we did" before killing her. Clark, however, was able to convince the studio to retain the original ending.

In Glen Morgan's 2006 remake, Billy's enigmatic nature was abandoned for a greater physical presence. Morgan had intended to rework elements of the original film that were left ambiguous or implied, such as the cryptic phone calls to the sorority house. Morgan, an admirer of the original film, wanted to create a more defined version of the character, as well as reveal more of his traits. Morgan also wanted to explore subplots from the original film that he felt were not fleshed out, including Billy's history and the reasons for his insanity. Morgan thus created a subplot that explored the origins of Billy, which showed the connection between Billy and Agnes, the remake's secondary antagonist. Morgan was inspired by the life of Edmund Kemper, a real-life serial killer who as a child had been locked in the basement of his home by his mother, whom he later murdered. According to Morgan, he and producer James Wong had various disputes with Dimension Films executives Bob and Harvey Weinstein. In a 2014 interview, Morgan said his original intention was to have Billy as the film's only antagonist, but the studio forced him to include a second killer. Billy was originally intended to have survived at the end, with the original conclusion having Kelli and Leigh, who thought he was dead, in the hospital getting a phone call from him. (Note: According to Morgan, this ending was intended to be an homage to the original film's conclusion.) Bob Weinstein, who disliked the original ending, scrapped it shortly after the scene was filmed and requested that Morgan write and shoot a new one. In the new ending, Billy is killed after being impaled on the hospital's Christmas tree-topper.

=== Casting and portrayals ===
Nick Mancuso (pictured in 1976) provided the primary voice for Billy in the original film.

Billy was played by multiple actors in the original film. Point-of-view shots were performed by Clark, who also contributed the voice. The scene shot from Billy's point of view, where Billy scales the house and enters the attic, was done by Dunk using a custom-made camera rig attached to his shoulder. (Note: Attributed to multiple references:) The rig allowed Dunk to keep both of his hands free to perform the various actions during these sequences. Dunk also portrayed the character in the POV scene where Billy murders Clare, using this same technique. (Note: Attributed to multiple references:) In scenes that required Billy on screen, an unknown actor was utilized, though members of the cast and crew have failed to recall their name. Clark himself has stated that he had no recollection of who portrayed Billy during the infamous eyeball scene. Dunk suggested that Keir Dullea, who portrayed Peter in the film, was used in the sequence and was fitted with a special contact lens; however, Dullea has denied this claim. Years later, several crew members identified Clark as Billy in most of his on-screen appearances. The cast was deliberately kept in the dark about the killer and did not know what Billy would be saying during the phone calls. Clark himself provided Billy's voice for the other actors while filming the obscene phone calls to assist with the cast's performance. While filming, Clark would shout obscenities to the cast off-camera to facilitate their reactions of surprise.

For Clark, Billy's voice during the phone calls was a substantial part of creating the character. Clark states that he wanted the calls to "sound almost supernatural". A total of five separate actors voiced Billy in various sequences, including actress Mugsey Sweeney; while the primary voices for Billy were Clark and Mancuso, (Note: Attributed to multiple references:) the latter in his feature film debut. When auditioning for the role, Clark directed Mancuso to sit in a chair facing away from him so as not to see the actor's face. Clark then had Mancuso experiment with different voices to come up with one that fit the character, which got Mancuso the part. Mancuso spent three days during post-production recording dialogue, he described the experience as being "very avant-garde", with Clark encouraging him to improvise with the character's voice. During some of these sessions, Mancuso stood on his head to compress his thorax, making his voice sound more raspy and demented. (Note: Attributed to multiple references:) Mancuso also redubbed some of Dullea's lines during post-production. Carl Zittrer, who composed the film's soundtrack and audio, later recalled that Mancuso brought such a 'chilling intensity' to the role while performing the voice of Billy. Mancuso later reprised the role in the 2015 DVD and Blu-ray special edition, voicing the character as a part of the release's additional commentary track.

Robert Mann was hired to portray Billy in the 2006 remake, while Cainan Wiebe was cast as a younger version of the character. Mann attended two short auditions before he was cast in the role, with the filmmakers initially questioning him on his height, size, and ability to endure small spaces and prosthetic makeup. Likening the character to a "time bomb", Mann felt that Billy harbored a long-boiling rage because of the severe abuse he suffered, leaving him incapable of expressing any emotions other than rage. Mann recalled having a lot of fun on set while filming, calling the experience "funny and surreal". Burn makeup and prosthetics for the unused alternate ending took over four hours to apply, and Mann was instructed not to wear anything over the makeup for fear of ruining it. To film Billy's death scene, Mann was strapped to an elevated back brace with the tip of the tree attached on top of him.

== Characteristics ==
=== Ambiguity ===
Where other horror movies would have tried to explain the madman's behavior, or pull a big reveal in the final scene, this killer stays hidden throughout. At a time of year when everyone is supposed to be together and celebrating, he's at the edges, shrieking with a fury so intense and destructive that it's barely recognizable as human. Instead of drawing the attention of the authorities, his bizarre behavior makes him invisible. He's a creature so out of bounds with the season that he can operate with unsettling impunity. And not just impunity.

— Zack Handlen's characterization of Billy in his review of the film

Classified by behavioral scientist and psychiatrist Sharon Packer and art historian Jody Pennington as a "faceless killer", one of Billy's defining characteristics is his complete ambiguity. In contrast to many slasher film villains, Billy's true identity and motivations are never revealed in the 1974 film; his appearances are mostly offscreen. (Note: Attributed to multiple references:) In his essay on the 1974 film, Morten Feldtfos Thomsen writes the use of subjective camera creates a level of uncertainty and tension while "obscure[ing] the killer’s identity by excluding him from the image and confining him to a vaguely defined space outside of the frame." Lacking defining characteristics beyond his insanity, Zittrer states that the audience is then left to imbue the character with their fears and imagination.

Thomsen argues that, as a disembodied voice, the phone calls imbue Billy with an amplified sense of uncertainty. As an unseen presence in point-of-view sequences and the phone calls, according to Thomsen, it portrays Billy as "a quasi-embodied or even disembodied entity, simultaneously on-screen and off-screen". Film historian Martin Rubin noted similar characteristics with Bruce the Shark from the film adaption of Jaws, as both represent a remorseless, near-omnipresent and omniscient force.

In the absence of any clear motivations in the 1974 film, some writers have offered their interpretations. As Adam Rockoff states, there is no backstory or clear information to "rationalize or justify his madness". Writing for the entertainment magazine and website Birth.Movies.Death, Brian Collins states that the viewers are encouraged to try and solve the mystery of Billy: "we're not meant to figure anything out, but [...] we can't help but try." In her analysis of the original film, Lauren Taylor of Bloody Disgusting delved deeper into the character's psychology. Billy's obsessive rambling about Agnes or "the baby", Taylor comments, hints at a real or imaginary event where the character failed to protect a loved one. Implications of a traumatic past were also commented upon by SlashFilm writer Lee Adams, who writes that, in one of the phone calls, Billy takes on the personas of a mother and father questioning him on what happened to "the baby". As Adams writes, Billy's use of the English lullaby Bye, baby Bunting and his later reference to himself as "filthy" while conversing about Agnes, Adams theorized, implied an incident where Billy had sexually assaulted a young girl and murdered her before she could tell anyone.

Alternately, Taylor comments that the motivation behind Billy's killing spree could be seen within the victims themselves, who display negative associations with motherhood, such as promiscuity, negligence, and lack of responsibility. With this, Taylor concludes that Billy's motivation could be linked to this and the holiday season itself, with his killing spree being the character's way of "ridding the world of sinners". This theory was echoed by Anton Bitel of Little White Lies, who described Billy as "a dark version of Santa Claus, meting out punishments to the naughty and the nice alike."

Writer and director Morgan wanted a more defined killer for the 2006 remake, abandoning the original character's ambiguity in favor of a more traditional slasher villain. As Jason Zinoman stated, Billy's lack of backstory was altered by Morgan for the remake, with the film going "back in time" to reveal the character's identity and motivations. This iteration was negatively received by critics and fans of the original, who felt it removed most of the interest and mystery of the character.

=== Personality ===
In his original appearance, Billy was depicted as a violent, mentally disturbed, and sexually perverted young man. Earlier drafts of Moore's script describe Billy's fractured mind as he regresses from the voice of a child and woman to sounding more animalistic. In the book It's Me Billy: Black Christmas Revisited, authors Paul Downey and David Hastings note this behavior is comparable to the mental disorders schizophrenia and bipolar disorder, as Billy converses with the corpses of his victims: "one does wonder what he is potentially seeing in his own mind". When Billy goes on a destructive rampage after murdering Mrs. Mac, Clark depicts Billy "acting out" on his mental anguish and rage, revealing the character's inner conflict.

Writers have commented that the character was grounded in realism, as opposed to the more popular slasher villains. According to John Saxon, who portrayed Lt. Fuller in the original film, Billy had a "naturalistic basis" rather than a supernatural one, representing the darkest part of humanity "tormented and was capable of committing horrific [acts]". Analyzing the original film, Bud Wilkins of Slant Magazine notes Billy embodied a more realistic and human killer in contrast to what he called "the unstoppable boogeyman that Michael Myers represents." Some commentators have highlighted the believability of the obscene phone calls. Jamie Righetti of IndieWire points out that Billy's obscene phone calls, "ma[de] it clear that some horrors are all too common, and don't require a boogeyman in a mask."

Novelizations of the original film would expand upon aspects of the character, including his mental instability. Hays' 1976 novelization extends the implications of the 1974 film that Billy has dissociative identity disorder, adding inner dialogue to the character. In the novel, Billy is tormented by self-loathing and feelings of remorse, revealing his infatuation with Barb after observing her from outside the house, culminating with her murder.

While the remake would retain Billy's mental instability, Morgan chose to add more details, portraying him as being born with severe jaundice, which turned his skin yellow. Billy's insanity was also explained as being the result of severe abuse at the hands of his mother and isolation, leading to the birth of his sister/daughter after being raped by his mother. (Note: Attributed to multiple references:) Robert Mann, who portrayed the adult character in the remake, felt that Billy's abuse at the hands of his mother created a long-suppressed rage that threatened to emerge at any moment, and Billy's moments of extreme violence came from that long-boiling hatred stemming from years of abuse. Mann also felt that this abuse and isolation left Billy incapable of dealing with his emotions, with the anger being an expression of sadness, which Mann felt was Billy's true feelings. Morgan stated that Billy's motivation centers from a twisted interpretation of love and family, which Billy equated with violence after witnessing his father's murder and the years of maternal abuse he suffered. Morgan went on to reveal that Billy's acts of cannibalism were, in the character's view, a way of "showing his love to them".

Art and cultural historian Berit Åström explained that many aspects of the character in the remake, including his backstory and motivations, mirrored that of Norman Bates in Alfred Hitchcock's Psycho, noting both characters have Oedipus complexes toward their abusive mothers. Åström further explained that both eventually committed matricide. Several critics, including admirers of the original film, have criticized the remake's exploration of the character's backstory as being generic and less frightening. In her book Life Lessons from Slasher Films, Jessica Robinson argued that the remake's extensive backstory for the character was an attempt by the filmmakers to elicit sympathy for the character.

== Analysis ==
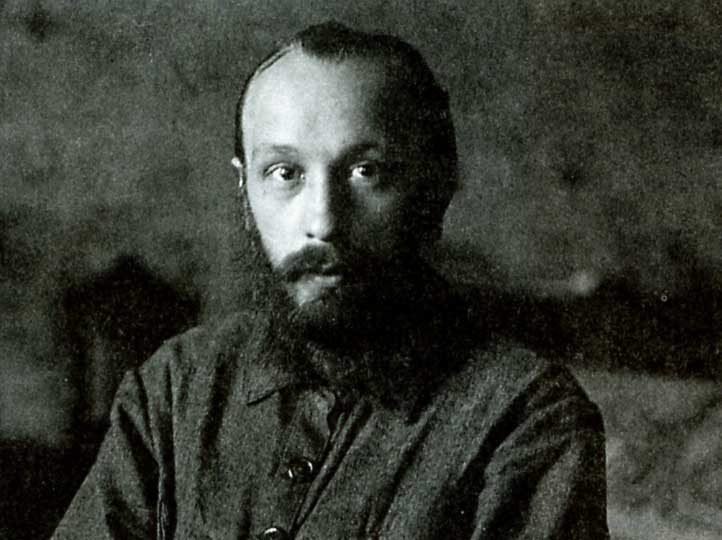
Billy's ambiguity and behavior have been compared to Mikhail Bakhtin's theories on social abnormality.

For the original film, some writers have interpreted Billy as a representation of the feminist themes. In their book Misogyny, Misandry, and Misanthropy, R. Howard Bloch and Frances Ferguson describe Billy as a representation of Freudian attributes, with Barb's murder with a glass unicorn a symbol of male empowerment. He is later disarmed by the film's final girl (Jess) in a form of symbolic castration, as Carol J. Clover states, "she specifically unmans her oppressor [presenting] the castration, literal or symbolic of the killer at her hands". Writing for the online publication Thrillist, Jourdain Searles described the character as a critique of toxic masculinity, calling the character "more metaphor than man, an unstoppable, unexplainable personification of masculine id with a singular purpose: to kill all the pretty women." Searles also notes that Billy's dialogue hinted at a deep-seated fury towards women, which seemed to emerge in their presence.

Billy's phone calls have been interpreted by writers as a symbol of the dangers of technology. The phone itself, according to film historian Marc Olivier, was an extension of the character and represented what he called "the primordial terror hidden in the device itself". Oliver further notes the parallels between the phone calls and prank calling, a view shared by filmmaker and literary critic John Kenneth Muir.

Downey and Hastings describe Billy as an example of scholar Mikhail Bakhtin's theories on carnivalesque and the grotesque body. According to Bakhtin, the "carnivalesque" is characterized by its breakdown of hierarchy, social barriers, and prohibitions, while the "grotesque body" he defines as one of degradation, unashamed excess, anathema to authority, and pious austerity. Downey and Hastings's analysis highlights Billy as "an agent of carnival process", exemplified not only through his obscene language and his mocking of Jess's unborn child but also through his behavior functioning to undermine and challenge society norms. Downey and Hastings argue that Billy is a manifestation of Bakhtin's grotesque body, commenting on Clark's portrayal of him as a shadowy presence that is "not whole" as a person, suspending the normal hierarchical distinctions and societal barriers through his abnormal behavior. A further example of Billy as the perpetrator of Bakhtin's grotesque body, Downey and Hastings note, is the display of his victims in a parody of feminist types. At the film's end, Barb and Phyl are mutilated in a fashion that depowers their sexuality, symbolically releasing them of their "socially imposed sex roles", which exemplifies Bakhtin's theory that carnivalesque "exalts the blurring and shifting of gender distinctions".

== Legacy ==
Since his first appearance in the original film, Billy has been credited by several writers as introducing many of the tropes that later became a staple for the slasher film genre, (Note: Attributed to multiple references:) such as the image of the "faceless killer", predating John Carpenter's Halloween. Both Billy and Black Christmas itself have been described by authors as being overshadowed by more popular slasher film entries and villains. According to some critics and historians, Halloween was possibly inspired and influenced by Clark's film and its antagonist. Clark himself has stated that Carpenter might have drawn partial inspiration for Carpenter's film after a conversation about what a possible sequel to Black Christmas might look like. However, Clark also admitted that this may or may not have been the case, and Carpenter himself denied 'borrowing' anything from Clark's film, noting that Halloween was not originally his idea. Many aspects of Billy, including his threatening phone calls, were utilized in many other slasher films and characters. Complex's Matt Barrone pointed out that Scream franchise's Ghostface killer, who uses the same method of phoning his victims, would not have existed if not for Black Christmas and Billy.

In 2016, Bloody Disgusting included Billy in their list of "The 10 Best Non-Monster Horror Villains", calling him "the prototypical slasher villain". Since then, the character has appeared in several lists of top horror film villains, including GamesRadar+ (2017), Collider (2023), and Screen Rant (2024). Other publications have included Billy in lists of top film villains, including SlashFilm and CinemaBlend, both published in 2024.

He has appeared in several unofficial parodies and sequels over the years. In the 2006 mockumentary slasher film Behind the Mask: The Rise of Leslie Vernon, the title character was mentored by a "retired" killer named Eugene, played by Scott Wilson. According to writer David J. Stieve, the character was written as both an homage and an allusion to Billy, commenting that both characters helped "pioneer the business of fear", but were not as widely recognized as much as their successors. In earlier drafts of the film's script, Eugene was heavily implied to be Billy, but the idea was later abandoned in subsequent drafts in favor of making Eugene a combination of various slasher villains. Billy appears in Season 2 of the flash cartoon parody series 30-Second Bunnies Theatre in 2013. Billy later appeared in the 2021 fan film It's Me, Billy, written and directed by Dave McRae and Bruce Dale. The short, an unofficial sequel to the original film, is set nearly fifty years after the events of the original film. The premise centered on Sam, the granddaughter of Jess Bradford, as she visits her grandmother's old country mansion with her friends and begins to receive phone calls from Billy, who begins stalking them. (Note: Attributed to multiple sources:) A sequel titled It’s Me, Billy: Chapter 2 was released in 2024, continuing immediately after the first film, as Sam and Jess fight back to survive Billy's killing spree. In both films, Billy was voiced by McRae and portrayed by Bryan Charles Peter.

Billy did not appear in the 2019 remake; instead, he was replaced by a cult of misogynistic killers. According to the film's director, Sophia Takal, Billy was symbolic of what she claimed was all the misogyny and sexism implicated against women. Wanting to further convey this theme, Billy was reinterpreted by Takal as a cult rather than a single killer. Despite not appearing in the film, co-writer April Wolfe revealed that the fight scene at the end of the film, where the protagonists use Christmas decorations as weapons, was a direct reference to Billy's murders in the original film. The decision to remove Billy from the film was unpopular both with critics and fans of the original. As one critic wrote, the "terrifying ambiguous threat" of Billy had been replaced by what they called a more "explicit and hackneyed embodiment of the patriarchy itself".

== See also ==
- List of horror film villains

== Works cited ==
- Catalog of Copyright Entries. Third Series: 1976: January-June. Copyright Office, Library of Congress. 1977. Archived from the original on September 7, 2023.
- Altman, Thomas (1983). Black Christmas. Bantam Books. ISBN 978-0-5532-3198-4. Archived from the original on September 7, 2023.
- Åström, Berit (July 11, 2017). The Absent Mother in the Cultural Imagination: Missing, Presumed Dead. Palgrave Macmillan. ISBN 978-3-3194-9037-3. Archived from the original on September 7, 2023.
- Benshoff, Harry (July 31, 2014). A Companion to the Horror Film. Wiley. ISBN 978-1-1188-8349-5. Archived from the original on September 7, 2023.
- Bloch, Howard; Ferguson, Frances (January 1, 1989). Misogyny, Misandry, and Misanthropy. University of California Press. p. 211. ISBN 978-0-5200-6546-8.
- Carl Brundtland (Director) (2002). Black Christmas Revisited (DVD). Canada: Critical Mass Releasing. Event occurs at 10:58-36:25.
- Brunvand, Jan (December 17, 2003). The Vanishing Hitchhiker: American Urban Legends and Their Meanings. W. W. Norton. ISBN 978-0-3933-4653-4. Archived from the original on September 7, 2023.
- Brunvand, Jan (2012). Encyclopedia of Urban Legends. Vol. 1 (Revised ed.). ABC-CLIO. ISBN 978-1-5988-4720-8. Archived from the original on September 7, 2023.
- Bob Clark (Director) (1974). Black Christmas (Motion picture). Canada: Ambassador Films.
- Clover, Carol (March 22, 1993). Men, Women, and Chain Saws: Gender in the Modern Horror Film. Princeton University Press. ISBN 978-0-6910-0620-8.
- Collum, Jason (January 27, 2015). Assault of the Killer B's: Interviews with 20 Cult Film Actresses. McFarland & Company. ISBN 978-0-7864-8041-8. Archived from the original on September 7, 2023.
- Crump, William (August 28, 2013). The Christmas Encyclopedia (3rd ed.). McFarland & Company. ISBN 978-1-4766-0573-9. Archived from the original on September 7, 2023.
- Dan Duffin (Director) (2006). The 12 Days of 'Black Christmas' (DVD). Canada: Critical Mass Releasing. Event occurs at 1:07-13:35.
- Hastings, David; Downey, Paul (February 14, 2022). It's me, Billy - Black Christmas Revisited. BearManor Media. ISBN 978-1-6293-3869-9.
- Harper, Jim (2004). Legacy of Blood: A Comprehensive Guide to Slasher Movies. Critical Vision. ISBN 978-1-9004-8639-2. Archived from the original on September 7, 2023.
- Hart, Adam (2019). Monstrous Forms: Moving Image Horror Across Media. Oxford University Press. ISBN 978-0-1909-1623-7. Archived from the original on September 7, 2023.
- Hart, Adam (October 29, 2018). Reisenleitner, Markus (ed.). "Killer POV: First-Person Camera and Sympathetic Identification in Modern Horror" (PDF). Imaginations. 9 (1). University of Alberta Library: 69–86. doi:10.17742/IMAGE.p70s.9.1.6. ISSN 1918-8439.
- Koven, Mikel (2008). Film, Folklore, and Urban Legends. Scarecrow Press. ISBN 978-0-8108-6025-4. Archived from the original on August 17, 2023.
- Hantke, Steffen (June 1, 2010). American Horror Film: The Genre at the Turn of the Millennium. University Press of Mississippi. ISBN 978-1-6047-3454-6.
- Hays, Lee (1976). Black Christmas. Popular Library. ISBN 0-9658-6577-0. Archived from the original on September 7, 2023.
- Markusen, Bruce (July 16, 2021). Hosted Horror on Television: The Films and Faces of Shock Theater, Creature Features and Chiller Theater. McFarland & Company. ISBN 978-1-4766-8461-1. Archived from the original on September 7, 2023.
- Justin McConnell (Director); George Mihalka (Director) (2015). Black Christmas Legacy (DVD). Canada: Anchor Bay Entertainment. Event occurs at 6:02-32:45.
- Bakhtin, Mikhail (1984). Rabelais and His World (reprint ed.). Indiana University Press. ISBN 978-0-2532-0341-0.
- Glen Morgan (2006). Black Christmas (Motion picture). United States: Dimension Films.
- Glen Morgan (director) (2006). What Have You Done? The Remaking of 'Black Christmas' (DVD). United States: Genius Productions, Inc. Event occurs at 5:50-26:29.
- Muir, John (November 22, 2012). Horror Films of the 1970s. McFarland & Company. ISBN 978-0-7864-9156-8.
- Nowell, Richard (December 23, 2010). Blood Money: A History of the First Teen Slasher Film Cycle. Bloomsbury Publishing. ISBN 978-1-4411-8850-2.
- Olivier, Marc (February 11, 2020). Household Horror: Cinematic Fear and the Secret Life of Everyday Objects. Indiana University Press. ISBN 978-0-253-04656-7. Archived from the original on September 7, 2023.
- Packer, Sharon; Pennington, Jody (July 15, 2014). A History of Evil in Popular Culture: What Hannibal Lecter, Stephen King, and Vampires Reveal About America. ABC-CLIO. ISBN 978-0-3133-9771-4.
- Paszylk, Bartłomiej (June 8, 2009). The Pleasure and Pain of Cult Horror Films: An Historical Survey. McFarland & Company. ISBN 978-0-7864-5327-6.
- Power, Ed (December 11, 2019). "The curse of Black Christmas: the man behind The Prowler on the slasher film that ruined his career". The Daily Telegraph. Archived from the original on December 26, 2019.
- Rist, Peter (2001). Guide to the Cinema(s) of Canada. Greenwood Publishing Group. ISBN 978-0-3132-9931-5. Archived from the original on September 7, 2023.
- Robinson, Jessica (June 7, 2012). Life Lessons from Slasher Films. Scarecrow Press. ISBN 978-0-8108-8503-5.
- Rockoff, Adam (October 21, 2011). Going to Pieces: The Rise and Fall of the Slasher Film, 1978–1986. McFarland & Company. ISBN 978-0-7864-6932-1. Archived from the original on September 7, 2023.
- Rubin, Martin (March 28, 1999). Thrillers. Genres in American Cinema. Cambridge University Press. ISBN 978-0-5215-8839-3. Archived from the original on September 7, 2023.
- Schaefer, Stephen (December 11, 2019). "Horror fans dreaming of a new Black Christmas". The Boston Herald. Archived from the original on January 13, 2020.
- McInnes, Douglas; Shiman, Jennifer (December 26, 2013). "Black Christmas in 30 seconds with bunnies". 30-Second Bunnies Theatre. Season 2. Episode 2. Fearnet.com. Archived from the original on April 12, 2020.
- Shotwell, James (December 15, 2016). "Slay Ride: In defense of Glen Morgan's 2006 Black Christmas reboot". Substream Magazine. Archived from the original on May 1, 2019.
- Thomsen, Morten (January 2021). "Body, Telephone, Voice: Black Christmas (1974) and Monstrous Cinema". Acta Universitatis Sapientiae, Film and Media Studies. 20 (1). Scientia Publishing House: 20–35. doi:10.2478/ausfm-2021-0012. ISSN 2066-7779.
- Thrower, Stephen (2007). Nightmare USA: The Untold Story of the Exploitation Independents. FAB Press. ISBN 978-1-9032-5446-2. Archived from the original on September 7, 2023.
- Vander Kaay, Chris; Vander Kaay, Kathleen (August 15, 2014). The Anatomy of Fear. Norlightspress.com. ISBN 978-1-9352-5497-3.
- Willis, John; Monush, Barry (May 1, 2010). Screen World 2007. Hal Leonard. ISBN 978-1-5578-3729-5. Archived from the original on September 7, 2023.
- Zinoman, Jason (July 7, 2011). Shock Value: How a Few Eccentric Outsiders Gave Us Nightmares, Conquered Hollywood, and Invented Modern Horror. Penguin Publishing Group. ISBN 978-1-1015-1696-6.
