= Black Christmas (film series) =

Canadian-American horror film series

- Official franchise logo, first released in 1974.
- Created by: A. Roy Moore
- Original work: Black Christmas (1974)
- Owners: Warner Bros. Pictures (1974); Metro-Goldwyn-Mayer (2006); Universal Pictures (2019)

Print publications
- Novel(s): Black Christmas (1976)

Films and television
- Film(s): Black Christmas (1974); Black Christmas (2006); Black Christmas (2019)

Black Christmas is a Canadian-American horror film series that comprises three standalone slasher films, as well as a novelization. The original film has gained a large cult following and is credited as being one of the first slasher films, inspiring many others, including the critically acclaimed hit Halloween (1978). The series centers around a serial killer that stalks and murders a group of sorority sisters. The 1974 film follows the character of Jess Bradford as she and her sorority sisters begin receiving threatening phone calls from an unknown stalker. The 2006 film explores the background and motivation for the killer and his family. The 2019 film completely abandons the first two films' killer storyline, instead focusing on a new set of characters and killers.

Billy, Jess, and Mrs. MacHenry are the only characters to appear in more than one film.

== Films ==
Film	U.S. release date	Director	Writer(s)	Producer(s)
Black Christmas	October 11, 1974	Bob Clark	A. Roy Moore	Bob Clark
Black Christmas	December 25, 2006	Glen Morgan	Glen Morgan	James Wong, Glen Morgan, Steve Hoban, Dawn Parouse, Victor Solnick & Marty Adelstein
Black Christmas	December 13, 2019	Sophia Takal	April Wolfe & Sophia Takal	Jason Blum, Ben Cosgrove & Adam Hendricks

=== Black Christmas (1974) ===
The first in the series was the 1974 Canadian slasher film, Black Christmas (1974), which was directed by Bob Clark, and based on a screenplay by A. Roy Moore. Upon its release, the film received a mixed critical response and was a moderate financial success, and has since gained cult status. The plot follows Jess Bradford, a college student who begins receiving threatening phone calls, as the women in her sorority house begin to disappear.

=== Black Christmas (2006) ===
The critically panned 2006 remake was written and directed by Glen Morgan. The story delved heavily into the mythology of Billy, whose identity and motives were only vaguely hinted at in the original film. Both Morgan and producer James Wong revealed that the film suffered studio interference with Dimension executives Bob and Harvey Weinstein pushing for numerous re-writes and re-shoots to add more violence, which contrasted with Morgan's original vision for the film and caused an inconsistency in tone. Despite negative reviews and the Christmas release date causing controversy, the film was a commercial success.

=== Black Christmas (2019) ===
Shortly after the release of the 2006 remake, a direct sequel to the 1974 film was in development, which would have focused solely on Olivia Hussey's character. However, the film was scrapped following the death of Clark, who was killed by a drunk driver, on April 4, 2007.

In June 2019, Sophia Takal signed on to direct another remake, having previously worked with Jason Blum on his Into the Dark series for Hulu, while Imogen Poots, Aleyse Shannon, Brittany O’Grady, Lily Donoghue, and Caleb Eberhardt signed on in starring roles. Cary Elwes also joined the cast.

== Principal cast and characters ==
List indicators

This section includes characters who will appear or have appeared in more than two films in the series.

- An empty grey cell indicates the character was not in the film, or that the character's official presence has not yet been confirmed.
- ^{V} indicates a voice-only role.
- ^{Y} indicates a younger version of the character.

Character	Films		
Character	Black Christmas	Black Christmas	Black Christmas
Character	1974	2006	2019
William "Billy" Edward Lenz The Moaner	Bob Clark Nick Mancuso^{V}	Robert Mann Cainan Wiebe^{Y}	
Agnes Lenz	Mentioned	Dean Friss Christina Crivici^{Y}	
Jessica "Jess" Bradford	Olivia Hussey		
Mrs. Barbara "Mac" MacHenry	Marian Waldman	Andrea Martin	
Peter Smythe	Keir Dullea		
Barbara "Barb" Coard	Margot Kidder		
Lt. Kenneth Fuller	John Saxon		
Clare Harrison	Lynne Griffin		
Phyllis "Phyl" Carlson	Andrea Martin		
Chris Hayden	Art Hindle		
Sgt. Nash	Doug McGrath		
Mr. Harrison	James Edmond		
Kelli Presley		Katie Cassidy	
Melissa Kitt		Michelle Trachtenberg	
Heather Fitzgerald		Mary Elizabeth Winstead	
Leigh Colvin		Kristen Cloke	
Lauren Hannon		Crystal Lowe	
Dana Mathis		Lacey Chabert	
Clair Crosby		Leela Savasta	
Megan Helms		Jessica Harmon	
Kyle Autry		Oliver Hudson	
Constance Lenz		Karin Konoval	
Riley Stone			Imogen Poots
Professor Gelson			Cary Elwes
Kris Waterson			Aleyse Shannon
Marty Coolidge			Lily Donoghue
Jesse Bolton-Sinclair			Brittany O'Grady
Landon			Caleb Eberhardt
Nate			Simon Mead
Helena			Madeleine Adams
Franny			Nathalie Morris
Phil McIllaney			Ben Black

== Additional crew and production details ==
Film	Crew/Detail					
Film	Composer(s)	Cinematographer	Editor	Production companies	Distributing companies	Running time
Black Christmas	Carl Zittrer	Reginald H. Morris	Stan Cole	Film Funding Ltd. of Canada, Vision IV, Canadian Film Development Corporation (CFDC), Famous Players Film Company, August Films	Ambassador Film Distributors, Warner Bros. Pictures	1hr 38mins
Black Christmas	Shirley Walker	Robert McLachlan	Chris Willingham	Dimension Films, 2929 Productions, Adelstein-Parouse Productions, Hard Eight Pictures, Hoban Segal Productions, Victor Solnicki Productions, Movie Central Network, Corus Entertainment, Province of British Columbia Production Services Tax Credit, Copperhart Entertainment, Milestone Entertainment	Metro-Goldwyn-Mayer	1hr 31mins
Black Christmas	Will Blair & Brooke Blair	Mark Schwartzbard	Jeff Betancourt	Universal Pictures, Blumhouse Productions, Divide/Conquer Productions	Universal Pictures	1hr 32mins

== Reception ==
=== Box office and financial performance ===
Film	Box office gross			Box office ranking		Budget	Worldwide Total income	Ref.
Film	North America	Other territories	Worldwide	All time North America	All time worldwide	Budget	Worldwide Total income	Ref.
Black Christmas	not available	not available	not available	not available	not available	$620,000	not available	
Black Christmas	$16,273,581	$5,237,270	$21,510,851	#4,073	#5,489	$9,000,000	$21,510,851	
Black Christmas	$10,429,730	$8,100,000	$18,529,730	#3,746	#5,162	$5,000,000	$18,529,730	
Totals	$26,703,311	$13,337,270	$44,093,581			$14,620,000	$44,093,581	

=== Critical and public response ===
Film	Rotten Tomatoes	Metacritic
Black Christmas	71% (34 reviews)	65/100 (9 reviews)
Black Christmas	16% (64 reviews)	22/100 (17 reviews)
Black Christmas	39% (111 reviews)	49/100 (25 reviews)

== Literature ==
A novelization of the 1974 film written by Lee Hays was published in 1976 by Popular Library.

== See also ==
- List of films featuring home invasions
- Holiday horror
- List of films set around Christmas
