= Modern Philology =

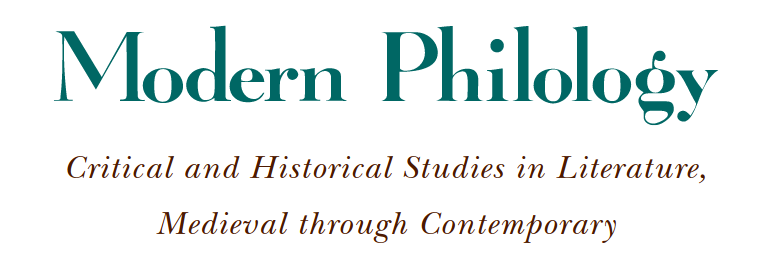
- Logo
- Discipline: Philology
- Language: English
- Edited by: Benjamin A. Saltzman

Publication details
- History: 1903-present
- Publisher: University of Chicago Press for the Department of English Language and Literature, Division of the Humanities, University of Chicago (United States)
- Frequency: Quarterly

Standard abbreviations
- ISO 4: Mod. Philol.

Indexing
- ISSN: 0026-8232
- JSTOR: 00268232

Links
- Journal homepage

Modern Philology is a literary studies journal that was established in 1903. It publishes scholarly articles on literature, literary scholarship, history, and criticism in all modern world languages and book reviews of recent books as well as review articles and research on archival documents. It is published by the University of Chicago Press. Currently edited by Benjamin A. Saltzman. Recent former editors include Timothy Campbell, Timothy Harrison, Josephine McDonagh, Ellen McKay, Frances Ferguson, and Richard Strier. The journal was founded and edited by John Mathews Manly.
