= Jess Bradford =

Character in the Black Christmas franchise

- Black Christmas character
- Olivia Hussey as Jess Bradford in 1974 film Black Christmas
- First appearance: Black Christmas (1974 film)
- Last appearance: Black Christmas (1976 novel)
- Created by: A. Roy Moore
- Portrayed by: Olivia Hussey (Black Christmas, 1974)

In-universe information
- Full name: Jessica Bradford (film); Jessica Bradley (novel)
- Occupation: Student
- Nationality: Canadian

Jess Bradford (Note: While simply credited as "Jess", the surname "Bradford" is used in dialogue in the film.) is a fictional character in the Black Christmas franchise. She is the main protagonist of Bob Clark's seminal slasher film Black Christmas (1974) in which she was portrayed by actress Olivia Hussey. Hussey, known internationally at the time for her role as Juliet in Romeo and Juliet (1968), signed on to the role after a psychic told her that she would be involved in a profitable Canadian film. Despite the dark undertones of the film and the mature themes, Hussey has described shooting the film as a great experience.

In early stages of the screenplay, she was named Jessica Bradley; this remained her name in the 1976 novelization of the film. She is sourced in numerous academic materials for subverting many prior horror film tropes of the 1960s and prior decades such as the damsel in distress. The character is distinctive for her feminist focused story arc which follows her decision to have an abortion despite the opposition of her estranged boyfriend. This was particularly notable at the time as it followed the 1973 landmark decision Roe v. Wade. This has led to her being a heavily discussed pop culture figure in film studies and the final girl theory. She is the first sole survivor of slasher villain Billy, although ultimately her fate is left up to interpretation.

== Appearances ==
=== Film ===
In the original Black Christmas, Jess is a member of the sorority house Pi Kappa Sig. Jess, along with her sorority sisters, began to receive disturbing phone calls from a disorientated man. During a Christmas party, Jess receives another obscene phone call and lets Barb, Phyl, Clare, and several other girls to listen to the incoherent ramblings of the disturbed caller, who does several different voices within each call he makes. The next day, Jess meets with her boyfriend, Peter, to tell him that she is pregnant and getting an abortion which causes him to get upset. Jess later attends a search party to help find a missing girl. After the girl's corpse is found, Jess heads home and receives another phone call. She calls the police, unaware that Peter is in the house until he startles her and argues with her. He leaves as the police come and tap the phone. She manages to keep the caller on the phone long enough for the police to trace the call and they tell her the man is calling from inside the house.

Jess calls for Phyl and Barb and grabs a fireplace poker and goes upstairs. She discovers the corpses of her friends and then sees the eyes of the caller who reveals himself as Billy looking at her through the door crack, telling her not to "tell what we did, Agnes..." before she slams the door on him. He then chases her downstairs and grabs her hair as she tries to unlock the front door. Jess manages to escape, fleeing to the basement with a fire poker for protection.

She locks the door just as Billy starts to bang on the door in rage. As Jess wanders the basement, she sees Peter looking into the window, and Jess kills him, believing him to be the killer. The police then hear her screams. They sedate Jess and unknowingly leave her in the house with the real killer, Billy, who is in the attic. Her fate is left ambiguous.

=== Literature ===
The character returns in the 1976 Lee Hays novelization although she is known as Jessica Bradley in this adaptation. The story retains the same plot as the film. Jess later appears as the protagonist in the second novelization of the first film, written by Armando Muñoz. Muñoz expands Jess’ characterization, writing her as a young woman determined to pursue her aspirations and a vocal advocate for women’s reproductive rights, who participates in grassroots activism. Like the film, Muñoz leaves her fate ambiguous after she kills Peter, with Jess being sedated against her will by the police and left in the sorority with Billy still alive. Jess tells the police that Peter and Billy are two separate attackers, although they believe her to be hysterical. An injured Billy calls her one more time, determining her fate based on how she responds.

== Development ==
=== Casting ===
Hussey, who had previously garnered international fame for her role as Juliet in Franco Zeffirelli's Romeo and Juliet (1968), signed on to appear in the film after being told by a psychic that she would "make a film in Canada that would earn a great deal of money". Approached by Clark to portray the lead role of Jess, Hussey agreed and left Los Angeles for eight weeks to film in Toronto, Canada in the winter of 1973. She described shooting the film as a positive experience despite the dark subject matter and stated that she worked well with Clark and two of the other leads, Keir Dullea and John Saxon. While admiring and respecting Margot Kidder as an actress, Hussey revealed she was intimidated by Kidder's straightforward and serious demeanor she had on set, causing Hussey to keep herself distant from Kidder due to their differing personalities and performing styles.

=== Design ===
As the Black Christmas films take place in a winter setting, the characters wear the apt attire. Jess begins the film in a black Christmas jumper that features two large, white hands stitched across the chest worn on top of a yellow collared undershirt and matching pants.

Later on in the film, she wears a black vest and black bell-bottom jeans over a mustard collared shirt; this outfit is the one most recognized by pop culture and horror fans.

== In popular culture ==
Jess returns in the fan film It's Me, Billy: Chapter 2 (2024), a sequel to the fan film It's Me, Billy (2021). Initially, Olivia Hussey was set to reprise her role; however, Hussey, who had a recurrence of breast cancer, was told by her doctor not to do the project. Canadian actress Lisa Kovack stepped in as her replacement.

== Reception ==
Shawn Van Horn (Collider) writes that while she is an example of the "final girl" trope, she avoids stereotypical traits due to her assertive characterization regarding her decision to get an abortion despite opposition from her boyfriend. Writer Judy Dodge Cummings attests that Jess is one of the first fully developed final girls, stating that she is "independent and determined than pure and passive like most female characters in horror movies." Meagan Navarro (Bloody Disgusting) describes Jess as being a "complicated heroine" in the same vein as Scream's Sidney Prescott. David Grove (MovieWeb) states that Jess is a "feminist icon" and that her survival is from "self-reliance, not male intervention," a common occurrence in horror films of the era. Aimee Ferrier (Far Out) argues that while critics commonly consider her as a representation of the "final girl" trope due to her "headstrong" characterization, the ending of the film leaves her fate ambiguous.
