= Beauty (2022 film) =

- Poster
- Directed by: Andrew Dosunmu
- Screenplay by: Lena Waithe
- Produced by: Lena Waithe; Michael Ellenberg
- Starring: Gracie Marie Bradley; Niecy Nash; Aleyse Shannon; Giancarlo Esposito; Kyle Bary; Micheal Ward; Sharon Stone; Andre Ozim
- Cinematography: Benoît Delhomme
- Edited by: Oriana Soddu
- Music by: Philip Miller
- Production companies: Hillman Grad; Media Res
- Distributed by: Netflix
- Release dates: June 11, 2022 (Tribeca); June 29, 2022 (United States)
- Running time: 95 minutes
- Country: United States
- Language: English

Beauty is a 2022 American drama film directed by Andrew Dosunmu from a screenplay by Lena Waithe. It premiered at the 2022 Tribeca Film Festival and was released on Netflix on June 29, 2022. It stars Gracie Marie Bradley, Niecy Nash, Giancarlo Esposito, Sharon Stone, Andre Ozim, Micheal Ward, and Kyle Bary.

== Synopsis ==
A young singer on the brink of stardom is determined to hold on to her identity amid her rising fame and the oppressive household of her religious parents.

== Cast ==
- Gracie Marie Bradley as Beauty
- Niecy Nash as Beauty's Mother
- Aleyse Shannon as Jasmine
- Giancarlo Esposito as Beauty's Father
- Kyle Bary as Abel
- Micheal Ward as Cain
- Sharon Stone as Colonizer
- Andre Ozim as Preacher

== Reception ==
On review aggregator Rotten Tomatoes, Beauty holds an approval rating of 22% based on 18 reviews, with an average rating of 5.10/10. Metacritic, which uses a weighted average, assigned the film a score of 42 out of 100, based on 7 critics, indicating "mixed or average" reviews.

Lovia Gyarkye of The Hollywood Reporter commended Dosunmu's direction for delivering "beautiful, indulgent vignettes" that are "aesthetically pleasing and immersive" in its vibes but was critical of the broadly straightforward story and its characters being "vague sketches" with "predictable and perfunctory" conversations, concluding: "As it stands, Beauty feels too distant, treating its mercurial protagonist just as her mother feared — like a fantasy." Noel Murray of the Los Angeles Times was critical of Waithe's interpretation of Whitney Houston's story being composed of "mid-20th century progressive theater" archetypes, saying "this semi-true story is ultimately too sketchy to have anything effective to say about Houston, mainstream success or being in the closet." Kristen Lopez of IndieWire gave the film an overall D+ grade, writing: "Beauty could have something interesting to say about the cultural and aesthetic straitjacket Black female artists endured in the 1970s and 1980s, and whether that's changed (or not) even today. But Dosunmu's airless directing and Waithe's thin script only amount to loud allegory that never goes anywhere and drowns out any compelling ideas that might be worth singing."
