= Lily Donoghue =

American actress (born 1998)

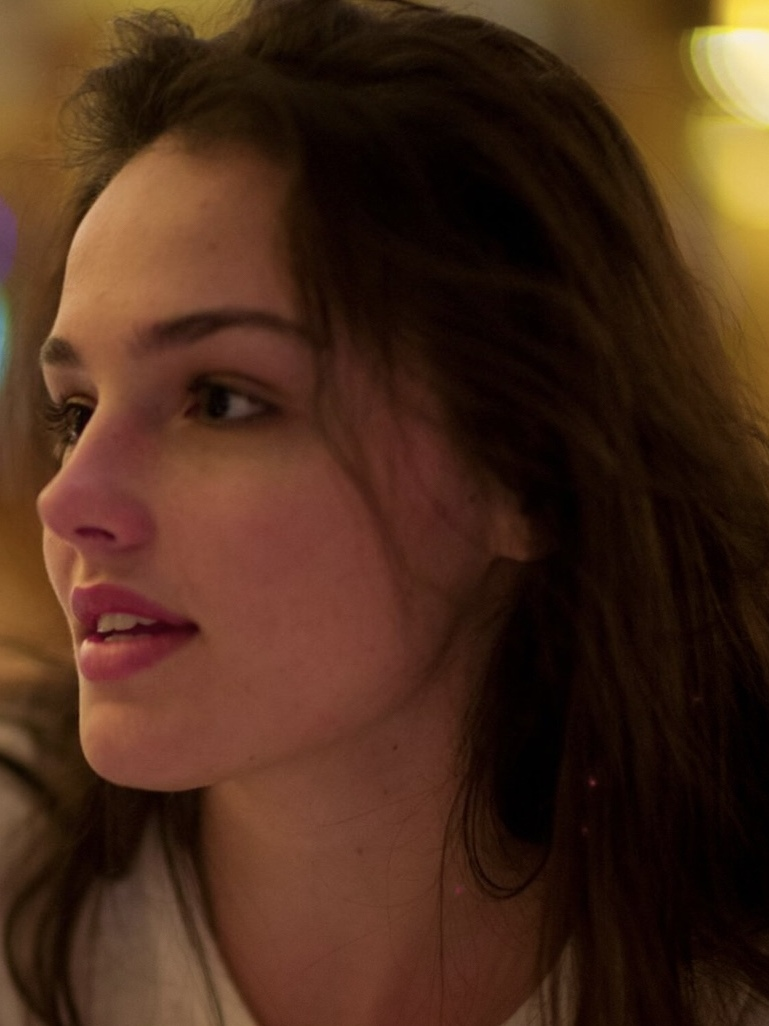
- Donoghue in 2016
- Born: Lily Marie Donoghue; 19 January 1998 (age 28); Stamford, Connecticut
- Occupation: Actress
- Years active: 2016–present

Lily Marie Donoghue (born January 19, 1998) is an American actress best known for her roles as Marty Coolidge in the Blumhouse horror film Black Christmas (2019), and Lisa Crowne in the Amazon Prime series Daisy Jones & the Six (2023).

== Early life ==
Donoghue was born in Stamford, Connecticut to Michael and Dawn Ann (née Lally) Donoghue, and was raised in Sarasota, Florida. She has a twin brother, Liam. In her younger years before acting, Donoghue competed as an award-winning national rower for the Sarasota Crew and as a swimmer in the Junior Olympics.

== Career ==
In 2017, Donoghue guest starred in the AMC network series Halt and Catch Fire. From 2017 to 2019 she made guest appearances in Grey's Anatomy, The Goldbergs and Jane the Virgin. After filming Grey's Anatomy, Ellen Pompeo became a mentor to Donoghue.

It was reported in 2018 that Donoghue had been cast in season 2 of the Netflix streaming series Dirty John as Tracy Broderick, a character based on Betty Broderick's daughter, Kim Broderick alongside Christian Slater and Amanda Peet. On August 1, 2018, it was announced that Donoghue would lead the Hulu drama pilot, Less Than Zero, alongside Austin Abrams and Cooper Koch, which was an adaptation of Brett Easton Ellis's novel of the same name.

Donoghue made her feature film debut in 2019 portraying Marty Coolidge in Sophia Takal's Black Christmas reboot with a cast including Imogen Poots, Aleyse Shannon, Brittany O'Grady and Cary Elwes. She has revealed that all four of the primary female leads auditioned for the main role of Riley Stone, which eventually went to Poots. In 2021, she appeared in the independent film Dr. Bird's Advice for Sad Poets.

In 2023, Donoghue guest starred as Lisa Crowne, Where she played a movie star who marries one of the band members of The Six in the Amazon Prime Video streaming drama series Daisy Jones & the Six.

== Filmography ==
=== Film ===
Year	Title	Role	Notes
2016	Dark Night	Lily	
2019	Black Christmas	Marty Coolidge	
2021	Dr. Bird's Advice for Sad Poets	Jorie	
2025	You're Dating a Narcissist!	Chloe	

=== Television ===
Year	Title	Role	Notes
2017	Halt and Catch Fire	Vanessa	3 episodes
2017-2018	The Goldbergs	Jamie Weisman	3 episodes
2018	Grey's Anatomy	Young Jo / Brooke Wilson	1 episode
2018	Less Than Zero (pilot)	Blair	unreleased
2019	Jane the Virgin	Young Brenda	3 episodes
2020	Dirty John: The Betty Broderick Story	Tracy Broderick	7 episodes
2023	Daisy Jones & the Six	Lisa Crowne	2 episodes
2025	The Summer I Turned Pretty	Lacie Barone	2 episodes
