= Black Christmas (2006 film) =

Film by Glen Morgan

- Theatrical release poster
- Directed by: Glen Morgan
- Screenplay by: Glen Morgan
- Based on: Black Christmas by A. Roy Moore
- Produced by: Marty Adelstein; Dawn Parouse; Victor Solnicki; Steve Hoban; James Wong; Glen Morgan
- Starring: Katie Cassidy; Michelle Trachtenberg; Mary Elizabeth Winstead; Oliver Hudson; Lacey Chabert; Kristen Cloke; Andrea Martin
- Cinematography: Robert McLachlan
- Edited by: Chris Willingham
- Music by: Shirley Walker
- Production companies: 2929 Productions; Adelstein-Parouse Productions; Hard Eight Pictures; Hoban Segal Productions
- Distributed by: Dimension Films; Metro-Goldwyn-Mayer
- Release dates: December 15, 2006 (United Kingdom); December 25, 2006 (United States)
- Running time: 84 minutes (European cut); 90 minutes (North American cut)
- Countries: Canada; United States
- Language: English
- Budget: $9 million
- Box office: $21.5 million

Black Christmas (also known and pronounced as Black X-Mas) is a 2006 slasher film written and directed by Glen Morgan, and starring Katie Cassidy, Michelle Trachtenberg, Mary Elizabeth Winstead, Oliver Hudson, Lacey Chabert, Kristen Cloke, and Andrea Martin. The film takes place several days before Christmas and tells the story of a group of sorority sisters who are stalked and murdered in their house during a winter storm. It is a loose remake and reimagining of the 1974 film, and the second film in the Black Christmas series. A co-production of Canada and the United States, the film was produced by Morgan and James Wong through their production company Hard Eight Pictures, along with 2929 Productions, Adelstein-Parouse Productions and Hoban Segal Productions.

Director Glen Morgan signed on to write and direct the film after the release of his 2003 remake of Willard. Shooting took place in Vancouver, British Columbia, in 2005. The film was co-distributed by Dimension Films and Metro-Goldwyn-Mayer (MGM). According to Morgan, he and Wong had numerous disputes with Dimension Films executives Bob and Harvey Weinstein regarding the tone of the script as well as the film's conclusion, which resulted in numerous re-writes and re-shoots.

In December 2006, upon anticipation of its release, the film garnered criticism from religious groups due to its depiction of graphic content in a holiday setting, as well as the distributor's decision to release the film on Christmas Day in the United States. The film opened in the United Kingdom on December 15, and premiered at Grauman's Chinese Theatre in Los Angeles, California on December 19. Despite backlash from some religious organizations, Black Christmas was released in the United States on December 25. The film grossed $21.5 million worldwide on a budget of $9 million, 30.1 million in domestic home sales, and received negative reviews by critics. A second remake of Black Christmas, produced by Blumhouse Productions and distributed by Universal Pictures, was released in 2019.

== Plot ==
Billy Lenz, born with severe jaundice due to a liver disease, is constantly abused by his mother, Constance. Five years later, Constance and her lover murder Billy's father Frank on Christmas Eve and bury the body in the house's crawlspace. Billy witnesses their scheme so they lock him in the attic. Since her boyfriend is impotent, Constance rapes 12-year-old Billy to conceive another child, and gives birth to a daughter named Agnes. On Christmas Day 1991, Billy escapes from the attic and disfigures eight-year-old Agnes by gouging out her eye. He then brutally murders his mother and her lover. He is caught by police eating cookies made out of his mother's flesh and is sent to a mental asylum, while Agnes is taken to a local orphanage.

Fifteen years later, Billy escapes from his cell on Christmas Eve and heads to his former home, now a sorority house for Delta Alpha Kappa at Clement University in New Hampshire. At the house, Clair Crosby, one of the sorority girls, is murdered in her bedroom by an unknown figure. Meanwhile, Megan Helms begins to hear noises and goes up to the attic to investigate. Upon finding Clair's corpse, Megan is attacked and killed by the same assailant. In the living room, the other sorority sisters, Kelli Presley, Melissa Kitt, Heather Fitzgerald, Dana Mathis, and Lauren Hannon, along with their housemother Mrs. Mac, receive a threatening call from the killer. Clair's half-sister Leigh Colvin soon arrives, searching for her. Kelli's boyfriend Kyle Autry arrives as well but is kicked out when Kelli discovers Megan's sex video with him. When the power goes out, Dana goes to the main breaker under the house but encounters the figure in the crawlspace and is killed. When they realize Dana's ambush by the figure, the remaining sorority sisters and Leigh go outside to find her, only to find their fellow sister Eve Agnew killed in her car.

With the police unable to arrive in time due to a snowstorm, Kelli, Melissa, and Leigh decide to stay inside the house while Heather and Mrs. Mac flee. In the car, Heather is murdered, and Mrs. Mac is impaled by a falling icicle. While Kelli and Leigh descend to the garage to investigate, Melissa is attacked and killed by the assailant. Kelli and Leigh return upstairs and find Lauren's eyeless corpse. Kyle returns to the house, and the three go to investigate the attic; while ascending the ladder, Kyle is dragged into the attic to his death by the assailant, who is revealed to be Agnes, now an adult. As Billy enters the attic, Kelli and Agnes struggle, leading the two of them into the empty space between the walls of the house. As the killers converge toward Kelli, Leigh helps her escape before they start a fire, leaving Billy and Agnes to burn to death.

Later, as Kelli and Leigh recover at the hospital, Billy, who is partially burned, kills the morgue assistant. While Kelli goes for an X-ray, Agnes emerges in her hospital room and kills Leigh. When Kelli returns to her room, Agnes appears through the ceiling and attacks her, but Kelli uses a defibrillator to kill Agnes. Moments later, Billy enters through the ceiling and chases Kelli to the stairwell. They briefly fight, ending with Kelli pushing Billy off the railing where he is subsequently impaled on the tip of a Christmas tree, killing him.

== Cast ==
- Katie Cassidy as Kelli Presley
- Michelle Trachtenberg as Melissa Kitt
- Mary Elizabeth Winstead as Heather Fitzgerald
- Lacey Chabert as Dana Mathis
- Kristen Cloke as Leigh Colvin
- Andrea Martin as Barbara MacHenry
- Crystal Lowe as Lauren Hannon
- Oliver Hudson as Kyle Autry
- Karin Konoval as Constance Lenz
- Dean Friss as Agnes Lenz
  - Christina Crivici as young Agnes
- Robert Mann as Billy Lenz
  - Cainan Wiebe as young Billy
- Jessica Harmon as Megan Helms
- Leela Savasta as Clair Crosby
- Kathleen Kole as Eve Agnew
- Howard Siegel as Beauregard Rice (credited as "lover/stepfather")
- Peter Wilds as Frank Lenz
- Jill Teed as a news reporter
- Anne Marie DeLuise as Kelli's mother

== Production ==
=== Writing ===
I think a slasher movie is really a modern monster movie. The difference between the Val Lewton movies [and] I Was a Teenage Werewolf is just exploitation.

— Morgan on his conception of slasher films, 2006

After his debut feature, Willard (2003)—a remake of an earlier 1971 film—failed to perform well at the box office, Morgan was approached by Dimension Films to write and direct a remake of Black Christmas (1974). Morgan was a fan of the original film, and cited it as a predecessor to the modern slasher film, which influenced his decision to commit to the remake. Star Crystal Lowe noted Morgan's admiration and aim to "take the film to a different level", while "respecting the fact that [the original] was a great movie to begin with".

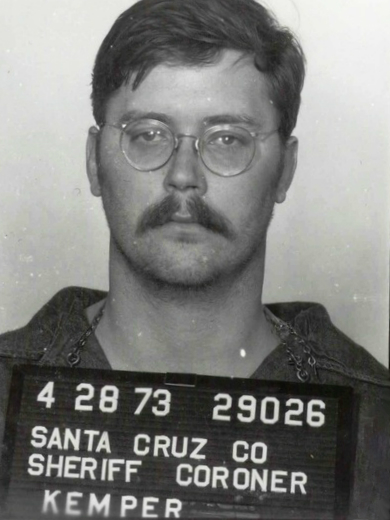
Morgan was inspired by the crimes of serial killer Edmund Kemper when writing the film.

In conceiving a new script, Morgan had intended to rework elements of the original film that were left ambiguous or implied, such as the cryptic phone calls received by the sorority house. While writing the screenplay, Morgan received input from the film's original director, Bob Clark, who also signed on to serve as an executive producer for the remake. Clark gave Morgan his "blessing", stating in an interview that the remake was "still Black Christmas", but explored new subplots that had not been fleshed out in the 1974 film.

Morgan created an extensive subplot for the film's killer, Billy, which introduced a secondary killer in Billy's younger sister, Agnes (in the original film, the names Billy and Agnes figure prominently in the obscene calls received by the sorority sisters). In writing the character of Billy, Morgan was inspired by the life of Edmund Kemper, a real-life serial killer who as a child had been locked in the basement of his home by his mother, whom he later murdered. The introduction of Agnes as a second killer was, according to Mary Elizabeth Winstead, incorporated in-part to extend the film's narrative arc, given that the "phone calls coming from inside the house" plot twist from the 1974 film was too familiar for contemporary audiences. The relationship between Billy and Agnes also allowed Morgan room to explore themes of family, which are also prevalent in the relationships between the female characters. In a 2014 interview with Morgan, he claimed that his inclusion of a second killer was under the urging of Dimension Films executives: "I felt that a ten million dollar movie of Black Christmas didn't need anyone's help, and they should have left us alone. But they had to have the two killers, and then they were after kids from The O.C. We compromised a lot".

=== Casting ===
In casting the sorority sister characters, Morgan sought actresses who were "of the same calibre", in order to avoid typecasting of the final girl and the supporting characters. Katie Cassidy, who also had recently had a supporting part in the When a Stranger Calls remake, was cast in the lead role of Kelli Presley. Michelle Trachtenberg, who had first attracted attention for her role as Dawn Summers on Buffy the Vampire Slayer, had initially wanted to avoid returning to the horror genre unless she were "given the opportunity to die" onscreen. Trachtenberg read the script for the film in the middle of the night while alone in her home, and was unnerved by it, which influenced her decision to sign onto the project; she was cast in the supporting role of Melissa Kitt. Canadian actress Crystal Lowe was cast as Lauren Hannon, a feisty sorority sister from a dysfunctional family, while Lacey Chabert was cast in the role of Dana Mathis, a conceited woman from a privileged background. Actor Robert Mann was later cast for the role of antagonist Billy Lenz, with Mann describing the character as being a "time bomb" due to the severe abuse he suffered. Oliver Hudson was cast as Kyle Autry, the male lead and red herring after finding the script effective, as well as being impressed by Morgan's remake of Willard: "The style of [that film] complemented the script, and I thought if Glen could marry the two, it would be cool, and a little different". Andrea Martin, who had played the role of Phyllis in the 1974 film, was cast as the sorority housemother, Mrs. Mac.

=== Filming ===
Black Christmas was shot on location in Vancouver, British Columbia, Canada. Given that a great deal of the film takes place during a blackout inside a home, the cinematographers and lighting department were forced to find inventive ways to achieve appropriate lighting on the actors, which included cutting holes in the walls. The film's prominent exhibition of Christmas decorations and its overtly red color palette were deliberately chosen by Morgan, who wanted to evoke an "American Christmas", which he characterized as being a cross between "Washington Irving and Coca-Cola".

On her first day of shooting during a fight scene with the killer, Lacey Chabert injured her leg and had to fly to Los Angeles to see a doctor; however, she was able to return to the set the following day and continue filming.

=== Studio intervention ===
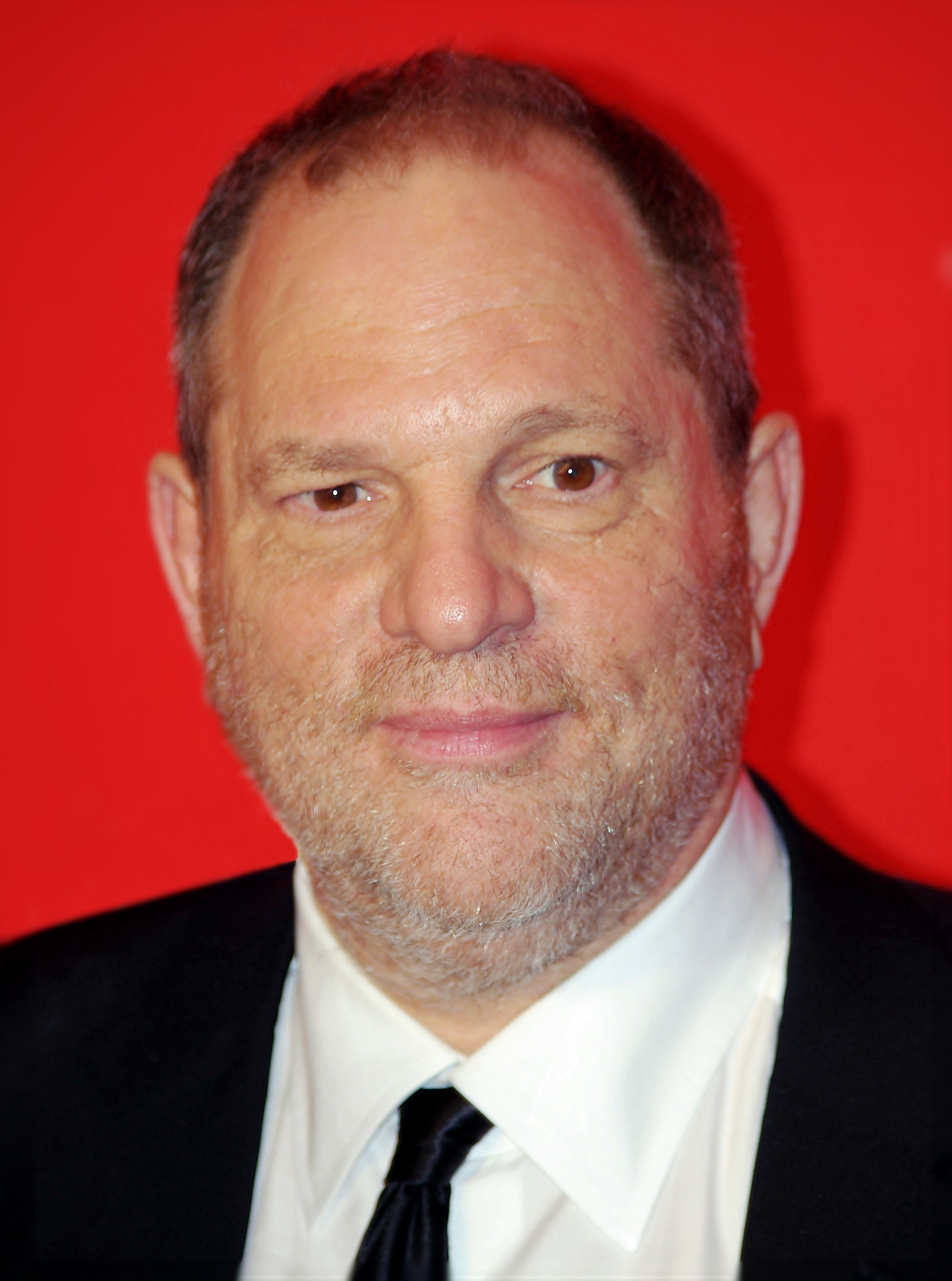
Harvey Weinstein demanded that the film's original ending be altered and had additional footage shot for television spots.

According to Morgan, he and James Wong had various disputes with Dimension Films executives Bob and Harvey Weinstein, specifically about the film's tone and the way it should end. Morgan's original script ended with Kelli and Leigh in the hospital receiving a phone call from Billy, whom they believed to be dead; this scene, which Morgan filmed, was intended to pay homage to the conclusion of the original film. This ending, however, was scrapped by Bob Weinstein, who requested Morgan write and shoot a different ending. This ultimately resulted in the more violent conclusion that appears in the theatrical cut, which has Billy being impaled on the hospital's Christmas tree-topper.

As a result of various cuts made during post-production, there are at least two different cuts of Black Christmas that exist: one which was released in Europe and one which was released in North America, which feature slight variations. The European cut, which is four minutes shorter than the North American cut, features an alternative death scene and ending.

After the production in Vancouver concluded, Bob and Harvey Weinstein oversaw the shooting of additional footage in Los Angeles intended only for promotional materials. According to Morgan, he was contacted by the Weinsteins, who wanted to "pick up some shots for TV spots", to which he agreed. Among the footage shot was Lacey Chabert being dragged through the snow; footage of a woman falling from the roof, where there is a "weird lawnmower electric [Christmas] light thing"; an unidentified woman (played by Jillian Murray) discovering a woman floating beneath a frozen lake; Michelle Trachtenberg aiming a shotgun and saying "Merry Christmas, motherfucker" into the camera; and additional shots of Trachtenberg in a hallway holding a shotgun while Billy levitates above her on the ceiling. This footage, which was never incorporated into the film, did appear in the official theatrical trailer as well as television spots.

== Release ==
Black Christmas had its premiere in Los Angeles on December 19, 2006. The Weinstein Company (parent of the film's production company and co-distributor, Dimension Films) chose to give the film in a wide theatrical release on Christmas Day 2006. Distributor Dimension Films had reportedly chosen to release the film on Christmas Day based upon the box office success of Wolf Creek, released in the United States by Dimension on Christmas 2005.

The film was released earlier in the United Kingdom, however, premiering on December 15. In the United States, the film was not screened for critics.

=== Release date controversy ===
The film drew backlash from Christian groups because of the studio's decision to release the film on Christmas Day. Several groups, including Liberty Counsel and Operation "Just Say Merry Christmas", called the film "offensive", "ill-founded", and "insensitive". L.A. Weekly columnist Nikki Finke also questioned the filmmakers' decision to release the film on Christmas, writing for Deadline: "And the entertainment industry wonders why it continues to have a huge PR problem as promoters of garbage? Showbiz marketing calls this counter-programming. Still, I don't understand: just how many disturbed human beings does The Weinstein Company and MGM think actually want to go see a gory movie on December 25th?"

Dimension Films defended the timing in a press statement: "There is a long tradition of releasing horror movies during the holiday season as counter-programing to the more regular yuletide fare". Film historian Michael Gurnow, of The Horror Review, countered Liberty Counsel's complaint, writing, "such crimes occur throughout the year, including [at] Christmas", and cited both a mass murder and murder–suicide that occurred on Christmas Day 2005 in Virginia.

== Reception ==
=== Box office ===
Black Christmas grossed a total of $16.3 million in North America and $21.5 million worldwide. The film earned $3.3 million in its opening weekend (December 22–5) showing in 1,278 theaters, and garnered an additional $4.9 million between December 29 and January 1, 2007, expanding to 1,544 theaters. The film remained in U.S. theaters until February 2007, earning $1,563 for the weekend of February 9–11 (from a total of 4 theaters) before concluding its theatrical run.

=== Critical reception ===
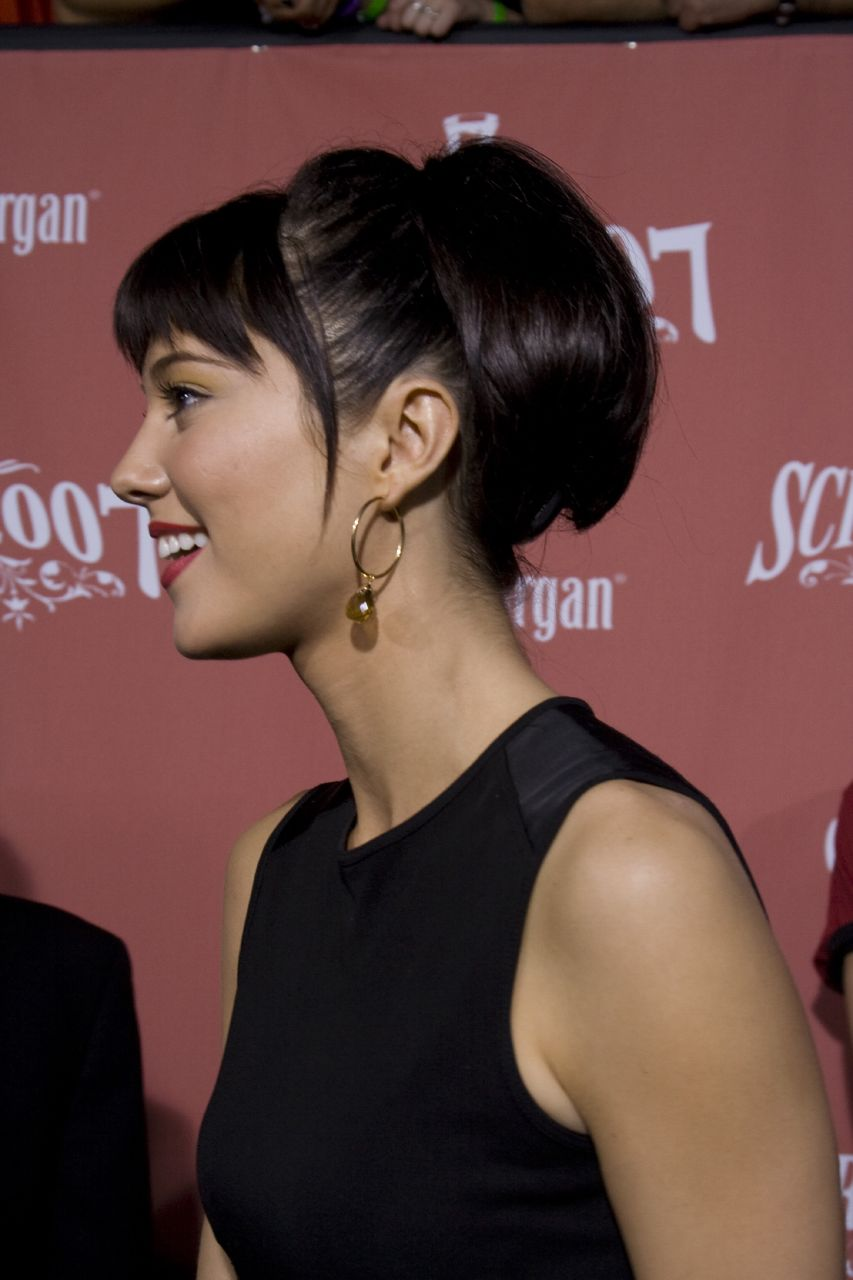
Mary Elizabeth Winstead attending the 2007 Scream Awards, where the film earned her a nomination for best Scream Queen.

On the review aggregator website Rotten Tomatoes, 13% of 64 critics' reviews are positive, with an average rating of 3.4/10. The website's consensus reads: "A gratuitous remake of the 1974 slasher, Black Christmas pumps out the gore and blood with zero creativity, humor, or visual flair." Metacritic, which uses a weighted average, assigned the film a score of 22 out of 100, based on 17 critics, indicating "generally unfavorable" reviews. The film has been characterized by film scholars and critics as an example of a contemporary slasher film.

Jeannette Catsoulis of The New York Times wrote of the film: "With a peephole-riddled set and a flashback-heavy screenplay, Black Christmas smothers terror beneath a blanket of unnecessary information, revealing too much and teasing too little. And despite some nifty camerawork—a shot of an asylum inmate gobbling Christmas dinner cuts seamlessly to a couple snogging in a car—the movie is a dismal Christmas card to its predecessor". The Guardian's Peter Bradshaw, however, found the backstory "ingenious", but concluded: "For the first 20 minutes or so, Black Christmas has some smart ideas and gags: then it all just gets predictable". Sam Adams of the Los Angeles Times wrote: "Like an ugly tie or a pair of slipper socks, Black Christmas is destined to be forgotten the instant it's unwrapped, gathering dust until the season rolls around again".

Jim Ridley of The Village Voice wrote: "The product itself isn't so much afterthought as afterbirth—a bloody mess to be dumped discreetly". When compared to the original, Desson Thomson of The Washington Post calls it "a drab, unimaginative remake. [...] The remake neither pays perceptive tribute to the original nor updates it in anything but hackneyed form". Joe Leydon of Variety goes on to say, "[...] there can be no argument regarding the scant merits of its slapdash, soporifically routine remake, suitable only for the least discriminating of gore hounds". Jason Anderson of The Globe and Mail wrote: "Lazy, perfunctory and free of tension, the new version will satisfy neither the admirers of the original nor anyone looking for a gory respite from seasonal good cheer", while Michael Rechtshaffen of Reuters wrote: "There are a couple clever touches here and there, including one sequence in which the end of a candy cane has been carefully licked into a highly lethal weapon, but for the most part the accompanying histrionics feel more regressive than retro".

Marc Savlov of The Austin Chronicle, however, said: "This film is an evocative, effective entry into the holiday blood-spray subgenre in its own right. And if it doesn't make your skin crawl... you probably ate too much Christmas dinner". Thompson also praised the acting of several of the lead performers, in particular Cassidy, Trachtenberg, Winstead, Chabert, and Lowe.

In the United Kingdom, Jamie Russell of the BBC also praised the film: "It's no Scream, but it lives up to its title, a black (comedy) Christmas movie, with halls decked with holly, mistletoe and a Christmas tree full of popped eyeballs. Unlike the recent When a Stranger Calls remake (which also starred Cassidy), Black Christmas has the smarts to be playful, with a choice selection of festive slasher gags pushing the envelope of bad taste: a candy cane's sucked into a stabbing weapon and angel-shaped cookie cutters do more than cut cookies. The result's an undemanding multiplex filler–a ho-ho-horror movie that knows it's the season to be jolly".

Horror-review website Bloody Disgusting gave the film three out of five stars and wrote that the film should not be compared to the original. The site concluded that the film is "a pretty good modern slasher". The Radio Times also gave the film a favorable review, giving the film three stars out of five and calling the film a "cheeky but no less brutal remake". For her performance, Mary Elizabeth Winstead was nominated for a Scream Queen Award at the 2007 Scream Awards.

In a retrospective by Fangoria, Ken Hanley said the film "benefits from solid and focused direction" and "wears its cringeworthy elements as a badge of honor". Film scholar Jessica Robinson also praised the film's depiction of its female characters: "The sorority sisters in Black Christmas are set up to be ideal females. They all have long hair, they are concerned with how they look, and they sit on the couch and file their nails. However, unlike stereotypical females, they also drink, cuss, and talk badly about their families".

== Home media ==
Black Christmas was released on DVD in the United States on April 3, 2007, by Genius Products. A HD DVD release followed on June 12, 2007. The DVD release, which was made available in widescreen and fullscreen versions, features an "unrated" cut of the film that runs 2 minutes longer than the theatrical cut.

The film has not yet received a Blu-ray release in the United States, but in 2007, the film received a region-free Blu-ray release in Germany that contained both the North American theatrical and unrated cuts of the film. In 2008 it received a short-print Region A Blu-ray release in Canada, which contained the 90-minute R-rated North American theatrical cut of the film in 1080i. In 2022, another Blu-ray release containing the North American theatrical and unrated cuts, as well as the European cut of the film (which features different and more violent kills as well as some alternate scenes and an alternate ending), was released in Germany, though it is Region B-Locked.

The film grossed a total of $30.1 million in DVD sales.

== See also ==
- List of films featuring home invasions
