= 30-Second Bunnies Theatre =

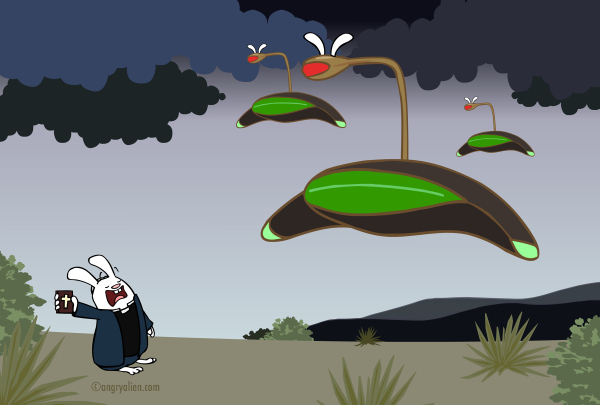
- Genre: Comedy
- Created by: Jennifer Shiman
- Based on: All films
- Starring: Jennifer Shiman; Douglas McInnes; John Mathot; Shannon Torrence; Amy Forstadt; Michael Dougherty; Bryan Singer; Kevin Spacey
- Country of origin: United States
- Original language: English
- No. of seasons: Unknown
- No. of episodes: 91 (list of episodes)

Production
- Producer: Jennifer Shiman
- Running time: 30 sec. (some episodes run over one minute)
- Production company: Angry Alien Productions

Original release
- Network: FEARnet; Starz; PrimeTimer (YouTube)
- Release: June 21, 2004 – March 11, 2020

30-Second Bunnies Theatre is an animated cartoon parody series featuring films re-enacted by anthropomorphic animated bunnies in 30 seconds. The series is produced by Angry Alien Productions, the one-woman company of creator Jennifer Shiman.

The series debuted in 2004 when Shiman sought to create a humorous web series. She unveiled a version of The Exorcist, re-enacted by animated bunnies in 30 seconds. It received an overwhelmingly positive response online from a global audience, prompting Shiman to create more re-enactments. In 2005, the "bunny troupe" was commissioned by Starz! to make new shorts. Each Starz-commissioned re-enactment premiered on Starz on Demand before moving online. The series' take on Star Wars was featured on CNN on April 16, 2006.

Angry Alien Productions released a selection of the shorts on DVD on October 20, 2009. Previously, the Titanic short was included on that film's 4-Disc Special Collector's Edition DVD, released in 2005.

In 2007, Crackle became a distributing partner.

In 2008, Shiman won two Webby Awards for Online Film and Video/Animation, as well as the People's Voice award in that category.

On June 13, 2010, Shiman announced on the 30-Second Bunnies Theatre Website that, after six years and 68 shorts, she was placing the series on hiatus to move on to other pursuits. The final short at the time was a re-enactment of the film Evil Dead II.

As of October 2011, Shiman completed three more re-enactments: Alfred Hitchcock's The Birds, Freaks (1932) and Michael Dougherty's Trick 'r Treat.

Shiman teamed up with FEARnet from 2012-2013 to make 2 additional seasons of horror movie shorts.

In Spring 2015 Shiman informed that she would indefinitely stop making re-enactments after Blade Runner.

In January 2018, Shiman launched a Patreon page to crowdfund a season of new bunny re-enactments. In February 2018, Shiman released the first re-enactment of the new season, When Harry Met Sally, for Valentine's Day.

In 2019, Shiman teamed up with TV news/gossip site PrimeTimer.com to create a unique bunny season in which the troupe re-enacts breakout episodes from popular TV series. In March 2020, the last reenactment was from The Twilight Zone episode "Nightmare at 20,000 Feet".

== List of films ==
- 30 Days of Night (2007)
- Alien (1979)
- Back to the Future (1985)
- The Big Chill (1983)
- The Birds (1963)
- Black Christmas (1974)
- Blade Runner (1982)
- Borat (2006)
- Brokeback Mountain (2005)
- The Cabin in the Woods (2012)
- Caddyshack (1980)
- Cannibal Holocaust (1980)
- Casablanca (1942)
- A Christmas Carol (1951)
- A Christmas Story (1983)
- Christmas Vacation (1989)
- A Clockwork Orange (1971)
- Die Hard (1988)
- Evil Dead II (1987)
- The Exorcist (1973)
- Fight Club (1999)
- The Fly (1986)
- Freaks (1932)
- Freddy vs. Jason (2003)
- Godzilla (1954)
- Gone With the Wind (1939)
- Goodfellas (1990)
- Grindhouse (2007)
- The Grudge (2004)
- Two-part Harry Potter Montage (2001–2007)
- Halloween (1978)
- Hellraiser (1987)
- Highlander (1986)
- House at the End of the Street (2012)
- The Human Centipede (First Sequence) (2009)
- Insidious (2011)
- It (2017)
- It's a Wonderful Life (1946)
- James Bond Montage (1962–2006)
- Jaws (1975)
- Jurassic Park (1993)
- Kill Bill (Both volumes) (2003–2004)
- King Kong (1933)
- The Last Exorcism (2010)
- March of the Penguins (2005)
- The Monster Squad (1987)
- My Dinner With Andre (1981)
- Napoleon Dynamite (2004)
- Night of the Living Dead (1968)
- No Country for Old Men (2007)
- Office Space (1999)
- Paranormal Activity (2007)
- Pirates of the Caribbean, 2 and 3 (2003, 2006, 2007 respectively)
- Poltergeist (1982)
- The Princess Bride (1987)
- Pulp Fiction (1994)
- Raiders of the Lost Ark (1981)
- Reservoir Dogs (censored and uncensored versions) (1992)
- The Ring (2002)
- Rocky (1976)
- The Rocky Horror Picture Show (1975)
- Rudolph the Red-Nosed Reindeer (1964)
- Saw (2004)
- Scream (1996)
- The Shining (1980)
- The Silence of the Lambs (1991)
- Sixteen Candles (1984)
- Snakes on a Plane (2006)
- Spider-Man, 2 and 3 (2002, 2004, 2007 respectively)
- Star Trek II: The Wrath of Khan (1982)
- Star Wars (1977)
- Superbad (2007)
- Superman (1978)
- Suspiria (1977)
- Teeth (2007)
- The Terminator (1984)
- The Texas Chainsaw Massacre (2003)
- Titanic (1997)
- Top Gun (1986)
- Trick 'r Treat (2007)
- Tucker & Dale vs. Evil (2010)
- Twilight (2008)
- The Twilight Saga: New Moon (2009)
- The War of the Worlds (1953)
- When Harry Met Sally... (1989)
- The Wizard of Oz (1939)
- The Wolf Man (1941)
- Young Frankenstein (1974)

== List of shows ==
- Game of Thrones (2011–2019)
- Stranger Things (2016–2025)
- The Walking Dead (2010–2022)
- Seinfeld (1989–1998)
- The Twilight Zone (1959–1964, 1985–1989, 2002–2003, 2019–2020)

== List of biographies ==
- Kevin Spacey
