= Black Christmas (2019 film) =

Slasher film by Sophia Takal

- Theatrical release poster
- Directed by: Sophia Takal
- Screenplay by: Sophia Takal; April Wolfe
- Based on: Black Christmas by A. Roy Moore
- Produced by: Jason Blum; Ben Cosgrove; Adam Hendricks; Brigitte Berman
- Starring: Imogen Poots; Aleyse Shannon; Lily Donoghue; Brittany O'Grady; Caleb Eberhardt; Cary Elwes
- Cinematography: Mark Schwartzbard
- Edited by: Jeff Betancourt; Ben Baudhuin
- Music by: Will Blair; Brooke Blair
- Production companies: Blumhouse Productions; Divide/Conquer
- Distributed by: Universal Pictures
- Release date: December 13, 2019 (United States)
- Running time: 92 minutes
- Countries: United States; New Zealand; Canada
- Language: English
- Budget: $5 million
- Box office: $18.5 million

Black Christmas is a 2019 slasher film directed by Sophia Takal, and written by Takal and April Wolfe. Part of the Black Christmas series, it is the loose second remake of the 1974 film, after the 2006 film, and follows a group of sorority sisters at Hawthorne College as they are preyed upon by an unknown stalker. The film stars Imogen Poots, Aleyse Shannon, Lily Donoghue, Brittany O'Grady, Caleb Eberhardt, and Cary Elwes.

Development of the project began in June 2019, when Jason Blum announced that he would produce the film through his studio Blumhouse Productions. Sophia Takal signed as director and co-writer with principal photography beginning soon after, lasting for 27 days in Otago.

Black Christmas was theatrically released in the United States on December 13, 2019, by Universal Pictures, coinciding with Friday the 13th. The film received mixed-to-negative reviews from critics, criticizing its deviation from the original film's story, the overt political messages, and its PG-13 rating, although critics praised Poots' performance and deemed it an improvement over the 2006 film. It has grossed $18 million worldwide on a $5 million budget.

== Plot ==
While walking home, Hawthorne College student Lindsay is killed by a masked individual. Riley Stone, a member of the Mu Kappa Epsilon sorority, struggles with PTSD after being raped by Delta Kappa Omicron fraternity president Brian Huntley. Meanwhile, her sorority sister Kris has angered the DKO fraternity and Professor Gelson following a petition from her requesting that university founder Calvin Hawthorne's bust be moved from the main building and another requesting Gelson be fired due to his refusal to teach books written by women.

Riley and Kris, along with their friends Marty, Jesse and Helena, arrive at the DKO fraternity for the talent show where Riley discovers new pledges for DKO engaging in a ritual around Hawthorne's bust. She saves a drunken Helena from being sexually assaulted by a DKO member and takes Helena's place in the talent show. Upon seeing Brian in the crowd, she performs a song with her sorority sisters condemning the rape culture at the fraternity. Later, Helena is abducted by Lindsay's attacker while Riley begins to bond with Landon, a kind-hearted fellow student. The girls start to receive threatening text messages from an account posing as Calvin Hawthorne, similar to what Lindsay had received before she was murdered. The next day, sorority sister Fran is attacked and killed by the masked assailant. While searching for Helena, Riley encounters Gelson and finds his list of the MKE girls. She reports the disappearances to campus police, but they refuse to help.

That night, Riley and Kris argue over Kris's posting of the performance in which Riley reveals at the end that Brian raped her. As Riley blames Kris for the threatening messages from DKO, Marty argues with her boyfriend Nate and demands that he leave. After Jesse is killed by the assailant, the girls are also attacked, leaving Marty injured. Kris discovers Jesse's body while Nate arrives to apologize and is also murdered. Riley kills the assailant, but the girls are attacked by two other individuals. Marty dies while Riley and Kris kill the attacker and identify him as a DKO pledge she saw at the ritual earlier.

The two escape in Nate's car and Riley theorizes that Hawthorne, who was known for practicing black magic, is responsible for the murders via his bust which emits black liquid. Kris suggests they go to the police, but Riley demands they go to the fraternity and the two separate. Riley enlists Landon to help her enter the fraternity. Kris discovers Lindsay's sorority sisters also being attacked by DKO and rescues them. At the DKO house, the frat brothers force Landon to become a pledge. Riley discovers Helena, who is tied up, before being knocked unconscious by a DKO member.

She awakens bound and is confronted by Gelson, Brian and other DKO members. Gelson reveals that after Kris forced the bust's relocation, they discovered Hawthorne's plan, involving a spell and the black liquid, to control women. The liquid allows the spirit of Hawthorne to possess the fraternity's pledges and send them out to murder women they deem unruly. Helena has been secretly working with the fraternity and stole items from her sisters that allowed the possessed pledges to locate their targets. Helena is murdered before Kris and other sorority sisters attack the fraternity. Riley overpowers Brian and smashes the Hawthorne bust. Kris sets Gelson on fire and the women and Landon escape, locking the frat brothers inside and leaving them to burn to death.

== Cast ==
- Imogen Poots as Riley Stone
- Aleyse Shannon as Kris Waterson
- Lily Donoghue as Marty Coolidge
- Brittany O'Grady as Jesse Bolton-Sinclair
- Caleb Eberhardt as Landon
- Cary Elwes as Professor Gelson
- Simon Mead as Nate
- Madeleine Adams as Helena Rittenhouse
- Nathalie Morris as Fran 'Franny' Abrams
- Ben Black as Phil McIllaney
- Zoë Robins as Oona Apteao
- Ryan McIntyre as Brian Huntley
- Mark Neilson as Gil
- Lucy Currey as Lindsay Helman
- Jonny McBride as Black Mask

== Production ==
An international co-production film between the United States, New Zealand and Canada. In June 2019, Jason Blum was revealed to produce a remake of the 1974 film Black Christmas through his studio Blumhouse Productions, alongside Adam Hendricks from the studio Divide/Conquer and Ben Cosgrove. In addition, Greg Gilreath and Zac Locke, also from Divide/Conquer, served as executive producers for the project.

Sophia Takal was announced as the film's director, having previously worked with Blum on his Into the Dark series for Hulu, while Imogen Poots, Aleyse Shannon, Brittany O'Grady, Lily Donoghue and Caleb Eberhardt were cast in the starring roles. Also that month, Cary Elwes was added to the cast.

Director Takal worked extensively to make this vision of Black Christmas as feminist as she could, (Note: In the original 1974 film, there were minor feminist themes (such as Jess deciding to get an abortion against her boyfriend's wishes). This version wanted to emphasize those themes and make them more obvious.) stating in an interview: "I wanted to make a movie where instead of feeling objectified or watched from a distance, the audience felt seen". It is the first Black Christmas film in which Bob Clark was not involved in the production process, as Clark had died in 2007. Bob Clark had produced as well as directed the original Black Christmas (1974) and had been an executive producer on the 2006 remake.

Unlike the previous two versions of Black Christmas, the remake was rated PG-13 by the MPAA, a rating Takal sought in hopes of making it accessible to new audiences, especially young women who were interested in horror and opening up discussions on major issues like sexual assault, although she was ready to fully commit to using the higher R rating if the ratings board would not grant the PG-13 rating. However, she would not use the PG-13 rating to water down the film's violence to a large degree, making it only slightly less violent than the original film.

Production began in New Zealand on June 23, 2019. Principal photography occurred for 27 days around Dunedin and Oamaru, with the University of Otago providing the setting. Filming concluded on July 31, 2019.

== Release ==
In the United States and Canada, Black Christmas was theatrically released by Universal Pictures on December 13, 2019, coinciding with Friday the 13th. The film was also released on digital on March 3, 2020, and on DVD and Blu-ray on March 17.

== Reception ==
=== Box office ===
Black Christmas grossed $10.4 million in the United States and Canada and $8.1 million in other territories, for a worldwide total of $18.5 million.

Initially projected to gross $10–12 million from 2,100 theaters in its opening weekend, the film was released alongside Jumanji: The Next Level and Richard Jewell in the United States. However, after making $1.4 million on its first day (including $230,000 from Thursday night previews), estimates for the film were lowered to $4.5 million. It ended up debuting to just $4.2 million, finishing fifth at the box office. The film fell 57% to $1.8 million in its second weekend, finishing in tenth.

=== Critical response ===
On the review aggregator website Rotten Tomatoes, 41% of 114 critics' reviews are positive, with an average rating of 4.7/10. The website's consensus reads: "Better than the 2006 remake yet not as sharp as the original, this Black Christmas stabs at timely feminist themes but mostly hits on familiar pulp". On Metacritic the film has a weighted average score of 49 out of 100 based on reviews from 25 critics, indicating "mixed or average" reviews. Audiences polled by CinemaScore gave the film an average grade of "D+" on an A+ to F scale, while those at PostTrak gave it an "awful" average of 1.5 out of 5 stars, with 38% saying they would definitely recommend it.

Simon Abrams of RogerEbert.com gave the film three out of four stars, saying that it "mostly feels personal and urgent thanks to some atmospheric scare scenes and some sharp dialogue that reflect the world outside the movie theater in ways that most other studio-distributed horror films don't".

David Fear of Rolling Stone gave the film three out of five stars, writing: "The best part about Takal and Wolfe's take on the material is that it's angry — righteously, deservedly, properly enraged about the crap that many people, but one gender in particular, have had to put up with for way, way too long". Kimber Myers of the Los Angeles Times wrote: "Fans of the original ... might not love writer-director Sophia Takal's take, but Black Christmas is a fun film that gets its kicks out of literally smashing the patriarchy".

Benjamin Lee of The Guardian gave it one out of five stars: "It's quick, cheap-looking and entirely devoid of suspense, atmosphere and dramatic tension, so inept at times that it makes 2006's questionable remake suddenly seem like a misremembered masterwork". Ed Potton of The Times also gave it one out of five stars and wrote: "The final half-hour brings ludicrous supernatural developments, some astonishing leaps in deduction from Riley and the least dramatic unmasking in screen history".

John DeFore of The Hollywood Reporter wrote: "Unfortunately, Takal's Black Christmas is far more ordinary, a blunt object in a fight demanding either sharp knives or explosives". Rex Reed of The New York Observer gave it zero out of four stars: "Despite its desperate efforts to justify the homicides, there's nothing remotely innovative or even goofily satirical about it".
