= Aleyse Shannon =

American actress (born 1996)

- Born: May 16, 1996 (age 30); Alaska, U.S.
- Occupation: Actress
- Years active: 2018–present

Aleyse L. Shannon (born May 16, 1996) is an American actress. She is best known for her roles as Kris Waterson in the 2019 remake of Black Christmas, as Breanna Casey in Leverage: Redemption and as Jada Shields in 2018's Charmed reboot.

== Early life and education ==
Shannon was born in Alaska and raised in Stafford, Virginia. Her father, United States Air Force Master Sergeant Kenneth "Ken" Shannon is White and her mother, Ramona Davis, is Black. The youngest of three siblings, she has two brothers: Laith Douglas Shannon and Zachary "Zach" Tyler Shannon. Laith, her oldest brother, is a retired United States Marine Corps captain and an associate director in the Neeley School of Business at Texas Christian University. She graduated from Colonial Forge High School in 2014 and was actively involved with the school's drama program. Her first role came with a mandatory part in an eighth-grade play. Afterwards, she developed a strong interest in drama, later enrolling at Carnegie Mellon University and graduating in 2018 from the School of Drama. During her time at Carnegie, Shannon lived in the Shadyside neighborhood of Pittsburgh.

== Career ==
In 2018, Shannon made her television debut in the fantasy drama series Charmed, portraying Jada Shields. In 2019, Shannon starred as Kris Waterson in a second reboot of Black Christmas, a contemporary interpretation of the 1974 horror cult classic directed by Sophia Takal and produced by Blumhouse Productions. Shannon has stated that the film was her first major shoot. She had not seen the original films prior, saying of eventually watching the original, "It was the first thing I did after shooting the movie. I'm one of those people that's like, I can't watch the old one while shooting the new one, I'm just going to feel inadequate. I fought it off for a bit, but I watched it and loved it. It was good..."

When Leverage: Redemption, an Amazon Freevee continuation of the 2008 TNT TV series Leverage, was announced in 2020, it was revealed that a main character from the original series, Alec Hardison (Aldis Hodge), would be reduced to a supporting role, with Hodge seeking to focus on other projects. It was subsequently reported that Shannon would be cast as Breanna Casey, a skilled hacker and the younger foster sister of Hardison, who would effectively replace him in the primary cast.

Aside from her film and television career, Shannon continues to act in plays. In 2023, she performed in Thomas Bradshaw's rendition of The Seagull, first written by Anton Chekhov in 1895.

== Personal life ==
Shannon is queer.

== Filmography ==
Year	Title	Role	Notes
2018–2019	Charmed	Jada Shields	11 episodes
2019	Instinct	Starr	1 episode
2019	Two Sentence Horror Stories	Karine	1 episode
2019	Inez & Doug & Kira	Teen Inez	
2019	Black Christmas	Kris Waterson	
2021–2025	Leverage: Redemption	Breanna Casey	39 episodes
2022	Beauty	Jasmine	Direct-to-streaming film
2023	It Is What It Is (or the Standards of Outrage)	Chaperone	Short
2024	Decibel	Scout	Short
2025	The Beast in Me	Olivia Benitez	Netflix miniseries; 5 episodes
2026	The Drop: A Snowfall Saga	Dara	

=== Stage ===
Year	Play	Role	Theatre
2023	The Seagull / Woodstock, NY	Nina	Pershing Square Signature Center, Off-Broadway

== Recognition and awards ==
Year	Award	Category	Result	Ref.
2022	Saturn Awards	Best Supporting Actress on Television	Nominated	
