= Cainan Wiebe =

Canadian actor (born 1995)

- Born: August 27, 1995 (age 30); British Columbia, Canada
- Occupation: Actor
- Years active: 2004–present

Cainan Wiebe (born August 27, 1995) is a Canadian actor.

== Career ==
Beginning his professional career as a child actor at the age of eight, Wiebe is a two-time Young Artist Award winner and five-time nominee, perhaps best known for his feature film roles in the Air Bud series, Black Christmas, The Sandlot: Heading Home, Diary of a Wimpy Kid, 16 Wishes and The Boy Who Cried Werewolf, as well as for his various guest-starring roles on such television series as Sanctuary, Tin Man, Supernatural, Falling Skies, R.L. Stine's The Haunting Hour, and American Horror Story.

== Filmography ==
Year	Title	Role	Notes
2015	American Horror Story: Hotel	Clint	3 episodes
2015	Tony's Chance	Ryan	
2013	16, Pregnant & a Guy	Louis	TV movie
2010–2012	R.L. Stine's The Haunting Hour	Dexter / Mark	2 episodes
2012	A Mother's Nightmare	Shwarzstein	TV movie
2012	Falling Skies	Marshall	2 episodes
2011	Sucker Punch	Tommy Soldier #2	
2010	The Twilight Saga: Eclipse	Young Vampire	
2010	The Boy Who Cried Werewolf	Rob	
2010	16 Wishes	Mike Jensen	
2010	Diary of a Wimpy Kid	Quentin	
2009	Beyond Sherwood Forest	Gareth	
2009	Dinosaur Train	Derek / Todd	3 episodes
2009	The Guard	Joshua	Episode: "Out of the Woods"
2009	Mr. Troop Mom	Slime Ball Boy #2	
2006–2009	Supernatural	Barry Cook / Bully #1 / Boy Victim	3 episodes
2007–2008	Sanctuary	Alexei	Recurring
2008	A Pickle	Charlie	Short film
2008	Robson Arms	Dream Sequence Robbie	Episode: "Gila Monster"
2008	Snow Buddies	Pete	
2007	Psych	Issac Mendoza	Episode: "Gus's Dad May Have Killed an Old Guy"
2007	Tin Man	Kalm	3 episodes
2007	Whisper	Boy	
2007	The Sandlot: Heading Home	Ryan	
2007	Masters of Horror	Young Toot	Episode: "We All Scream for Ice Cream"
2007	Bratz	Ashton	Episode: "Bratz vs. Brats"
2006	Black Christmas	Billy Lenz (5 & 12 Years)	
2006	Air Buddies	Mud-Bud's Boy	
2006	The 4400	Duncan Germaine	Episode: "Gone"
2004	Dead Like Me	Little Boy	Episode: "Send in the Clown"

== Accolades ==
Year	Award	Category	Work	Result	Ref.
2008	Young Artist Award	Best Performance in a TV Series - Recurring Young Actor	Sanctuary	Nominated	
2009	Young Artist Award	Best Performance in a Short Film - Young Actor	A Pickle	Won	
2009	Young Artist Award	Best Performance in a Voice-Over Role - Young Actor/Actress	Dinosaur Train	Nominated	
2009	Young Artist Award	Best Performance in a TV Series - Guest Starring Young Actor 13 and Under	Supernatural	Nominated	
2010	Young Artist Award	Best Performance in a TV Movie, Miniseries or Special - Leading Young Actor	Beyond Sherwood Forest	Nominated	
2014	Young Artist Award	Best Performance in a Disney movie	Tony's Chance	Won	
