= Frances Ferguson =

Frances Ferguson (born 23 August 1947) is a literary and cultural theorist who has taught courses in eighteenth and nineteenth century materials and twentieth century literary theory at a variety of universities, including Johns Hopkins University until July, 2012, where she was Mary Elizabeth Garrett Chair in Arts and Sciences at the university. She now teaches in the English department at the University of Chicago, where she is Ann L. and Lawrence B. Buttenwieser Professor.

Ferguson has taught courses on the rise of novelism in the eighteenth century; poetic, novelistic, and essayistic writing in the Romantic period; the rise of educational philosophy in the eighteenth and early nineteenth centuries; the rise of legal philosophy in the eighteenth and early nineteenth centuries; 20th century literary theory; and the poststructuralist critique of the social sciences. She was active in Johns Hopkins University's Program for Studies of Women, Gender, and Sexuality.

== Works ==
She has written three books (Wordsworth: Language as Counter-Spirit, 1977; Solitude and the Sublime: Romanticism and the Aesthetics of Individuation, 1992; and Pornography, The Theory, 2005). She is currently working on a project that aims to identify the difference that John Locke, Jean-Jacques Rousseau, Immanuel Kant and Jeremy Bentham's work on children and education made to their accounts of modern democratic political liberalism.
