= Black Christmas (1974 film) =

1974 film by Bob Clark

- Theatrical release poster
- Directed by: Bob Clark
- Written by: Roy Moore
- Produced by: Bob Clark
- Starring: Olivia Hussey; Keir Dullea; Margot Kidder; John Saxon
- Cinematography: Reginald H. Morris
- Edited by: Stan Cole
- Music by: Carl Zittrer
- Production companies: Film Funding Ltd.; Vision IV; Canadian Film Development Corporation; Famous Players
- Distributed by: Ambassador Film Distributors (Canada); Warner Bros. (International)
- Release date: October 11, 1974
- Running time: 98 minutes
- Country: Canada
- Language: English
- Budget: $686,000
- Box office: $4 million

Black Christmas (Note: The film was initially re-titled as Silent Night, Evil Night in the United States by its American distributor, Warner Bros., though its original title was restored for later screenings. It was retitled again as Stranger in the House for its initial television broadcasts in North America.) is a 1974 Canadian slasher film produced and directed by Bob Clark, and written by Roy Moore. It stars Olivia Hussey, Keir Dullea, Margot Kidder, and John Saxon. The story follows a group of sorority sisters who receive threatening phone calls and are eventually stalked and murdered by a killer during the Christmas season.

Inspired by the urban legend "the babysitter and the man upstairs" and a series of murders that took place in the Westmount neighbourhood of Montreal, Quebec, Moore wrote the screenplay under the title Stop Me. The filmmakers made numerous alterations to the script, primarily the shifting to a university setting with young adult characters. It was shot in Toronto in 1974 on an estimated budget of $686,000.

The film was released in Canada by Ambassador Film Distributors on October 11, 1974. Warner Bros. released the film in the United States in May 1975 under the alternate title Silent Night, Evil Night, though this title was retracted and the film was reissued under its original title beginning August 6, 1975. The film went on to gross $4,053,000 worldwide.

Upon its release, Black Christmas received mixed reviews, but it has since received critical re-appraisal, with film historians noting it for being one of the earliest slasher films. It is also praised for its influence on John Carpenter's Halloween (1978). Aside from it earning a cult following since its release, a novelization written by Lee Hays was published in 1976. It is the first film in the Black Christmas series, being followed by two remakes in 2006 and 2019.

== Plot ==
An unseen man climbs the exterior of a sorority house during a Christmas party and enters the attic. The house phone rings, and sorority sister Jess Bradford answers, discovering an obscene call from a previously known caller nicknamed "The Moaner". The caller rants in strange voices about someone named "Billy" and speaks vulgarities before threatening to kill them. Upset, a younger student, Clare Harrison, goes upstairs to pack, where she is attacked and asphyxiated by the intruder.

The next morning, Clare's father, Mr. Harrison, arrives, concerned she missed a train. Housemother Mrs. MacHenry offers to help search for her. Jess tells her boyfriend Peter Smythe she is pregnant and plans to have an abortion, angering him. Meanwhile, Mr. Harrison and sorority sisters Barb Coard and Phyl Carlson try to report Clare's disappearance to Sergeant Nash, who brushes them off until Clare's boyfriend, Chris Hayden, storms in and demands action.

That night, a search party gathers to find Clare as well as Janice, a young girl who has gone missing nearby. Volunteers locate Janice's dead body in a nearby park. Meanwhile, Mrs. MacHenry discovers Clare's body in the attic but is killed by the intruder with a crane hook. Jess receives another obscene call and decides to involve the police. Lieutenant Fuller arrives with a lineman to trace the call.

After Fuller leaves, an inebriated Barb suffers an asthma attack and retires for the night. Christmas carolers distract Jess while the killer enters Barb's room and murders her with a glass unicorn figurine. Another call from the intruder echoes parts of Jess's argument with Peter. Fuller reports the trace failed, and suspicion briefly falls on Peter. Jess and Phyl lock the house, but Phyl is killed after finding Barb's body.

A subsequent call is successfully traced, and Nash instructs Jess to leave immediately, realizing the calls are originating from within the house. Jess finds Barb and Phyl dead and glimpses the killer through a door crack. She flees to the basement and locks herself in. Peter breaks in, and in a panic, Jess kills him with a fire poker. Police arrive to find her barely conscious beside his body, assuming he was the killer.

Believing the danger over, police leave Jess sleeping in her bedroom with an officer outside. From the attic, the killer's voice is heard, and the hatch opens, while Clare and Mrs. MacHenry's bodies remain undiscovered. The house phone rings once more.

== Cast ==
- Olivia Hussey as Jessica "Jess" Bradford
- Keir Dullea as Peter Smythe
- Margot Kidder as Barbara "Barb" Coard
- John Saxon as Lieutenant Kenneth Fuller
- Marian Waldman as Mrs. Barbara "Mac" MacHenry / Mrs. Mac
- Andrea Martin as Phyllis "Phyl" Carlson
- James Edmond as Mr. Harrison
- Douglas McGrath as Sergeant Nash
- Art Hindle as Chris Hayden
- Lynne Griffin as Clare Harrison
- Michael Rapport as Patrick
- Les Carlson as Bill
- Martha Gibson as Mrs. Quaife
- John Rutter as laughing detective
- Dave Clement as Cogan
- Julian Reed as Officer Jennings
- Nick Mancuso as Billy / phone voice (uncredited)
  - Bob Clark as Billy's shadow / phone voice (uncredited)
  - Albert J. Dunk as Billy's POV (uncredited)

== Production ==
=== Development ===
Black Christmas was initially developed by Canadian screenwriter Roy Moore, who wrote the screenplay under the title Stop Me. Inspirations for the film came from the urban legend known as "the babysitter and the man upstairs", which had become widespread during the 1970s. Moore claimed to have been inspired by a series of murders that occurred during the holiday season in the Westmount area of Montreal.

As noted in an article for The Telegraph, the murders, which occurred in 1943, were perpetrated by a fourteen-year-old boy who bludgeoned several of his family members to death. Film producers Harvey Sherman and Richard Schouten had Timothy Bond rewrite the script to give it a university setting. Director and producer Bob Clark, who had felt the original script was too much of a straightforward slasher film, made several alterations in dialogue, and also incorporated humorous elements into the film, particularly the drunkenness of Barb, and Mrs. Mac, the latter of whom Clark based on his aunt.

Clark felt that college and high school students had not been depicted with "any sense of reality" in American film, and that he intended to capture the "astuteness" of young adults: "College students — even in 1974 — are astute people. They're not fools. It's not all 'bikinis, beach blankets, [and] bingo'".

=== Casting ===
Olivia Hussey, who had previously garnered international fame for her role as Juliet in Romeo and Juliet (1968), signed on to appear in the film after being told by a psychic that she would "make a film in Canada that would earn a great deal of money". Clark had also considered Jessica Harper and Cassandra Peterson for the role. Clark sought Keir Dullea to play the role of Peter based on his performance as Dave Bowman in 2001: A Space Odyssey (1968). The role of Mrs. Mac was offered to Bette Davis, who declined the part. Margot Kidder was cast in the role of Barb, and said she had been attracted to the character "because she was wild and out of control", and not a "conventional leading" part. For the role of Clare Harrison, whose murder jump-starts the film's plot, Toronto native Lynne Griffin was cast after her mother, who was also her casting agent at the time, got her an audition. Griffin would later go on to star in Curtains (1983), and in the acclaimed television series Wind at My Back (1996–2001).

Gilda Radner was offered the role of Phyllis Carlson. She accepted the part, but dropped out one month before filming began owing to Saturday Night Live commitments, and was replaced by fellow Second City comedy troupe performer Andrea Martin. The role of Lieutenant Fuller was originally given to Edmond O'Brien. Upon his arrival to the set, however, the producers realized he would be unable to fulfill the duties required of the part due to his failing health (stemming from Alzheimer's disease). John Saxon, who had read the script prior, was called by the producers who offered him the role. He accepted, and had to arrive in Toronto from New York City within two days to begin shooting. Saxon had previously appeared in the first giallo film, The Girl Who Knew Too Much (1963). Clark always intended to cast Saxon from the beginning as he was his first choice for the role, but miscommunications between Clark and Saxon's agent resulted in O’Brien being cast before Saxon officially came aboard the film.

For the role of the film's antagonist, Italian-Canadian actor Nick Mancuso was cast as one of the main voices in the phone call sequences. When auditioning for the role, director Clark had Mancuso sit in a chair facing away from him, so as not to see the actor's face. Clark then had Mancuso experiment with different voices in order to come up with one that was right for the character, with Clark later offering him the part.

=== Filming ===
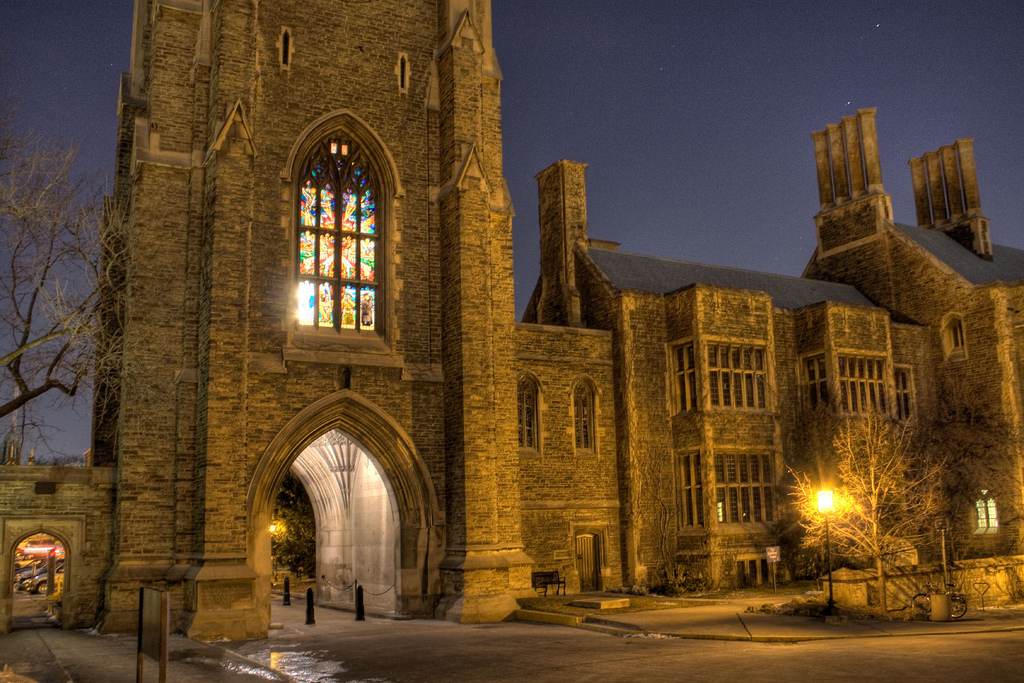
Soldiers' Tower at the University of Toronto is featured in the film.

The film was shot from March 25 to May 11, 1974, at a cost of $686,000 (equivalent to $4,299,282 in 2025), with $200,000 coming from the Canadian Film Development Corporation. The 20-room house featured in the film (located at 6 Clarendon Crescent in South Hill) had been discovered by Clark while scouting for locations, and its owners agreed to lease the home for the production. Additional photography was completed on the University of Toronto campus. According to John Saxon, Clark had meticulously drawn out storyboards with key shots, which he brought to the film set each day: "I could understand exactly what I thought he needed, and the scene needed".

Scenes in the film involving POV shots of Billy scaling the house were accomplished through the use of a rig designed by camera operator Bert Dunk, which was attached to Dunk's head as he climbed up the side of the house. Griffin's death scene, which was shot with a handheld camera in a real closet, was accomplished in only a couple of takes. According to Griffin, her character's surprise as the killer lunges from the closet was genuine as the actress later recalled: "It was a total shock because I didn't really know when to expect him to jump out!" Shots of Clare's corpse in the rocking chair required the actress to wear an actual plastic bag over her head for extended periods of time. Griffin would also state that these scenes came relatively easy for her: "I was actually, and still am, a fairly good swimmer so I could hold my breath for a long time. And I could also keep my eyes open for a long time without blinking".

Kidder remembered shooting the film as being "fun. I really bonded with Andrea Martin, filming in Toronto and Ontario. Olivia Hussey was a bit of an odd one. She was obsessed with the idea of falling in love with Paul McCartney through her psychic. We were a little hard on her for things like that".

=== Post-production ===
The composer of the film's score, Carl Zittrer, stated in an interview that he created the film's mysterious music by tying forks, combs, and knives onto the strings of the piano to warp the sound of the keys. Zittrer also stated that he would distort the sound further by recording its sound onto an audiotape and make the sound slower. The audio for the disturbing phone calls was performed by multiple actors including Mancuso and director Bob Clark. Mancuso stated in an interview that he stood on his head during the recording sessions to compress his thorax and make his voice sound more demented. Mancuso spent only three days recording dialogue for the character, later recalling the experience as being very "avant-garde", with Clark encouraging him to improvise with the character's voice.

During preparation in 1975 for the film's American release, Warner Bros. studio executives asked Clark to change the concluding scene to show Clare's boyfriend, Chris, appear in front of Jess and say, "Agnes, don't tell them what we did" before killing her. However, Clark insisted on keeping the ending ambiguous. The original title of the film was initially planned to be Stop Me. Clark has stated in an interview that he came up with the film's official title, saying that he enjoyed the irony of a dark event occurring during a festive holiday. According to Clark as well, Warner Bros. changed the title to Silent Night, Evil Night for the United States theatrical release.

== Release ==
=== Theatrical run ===
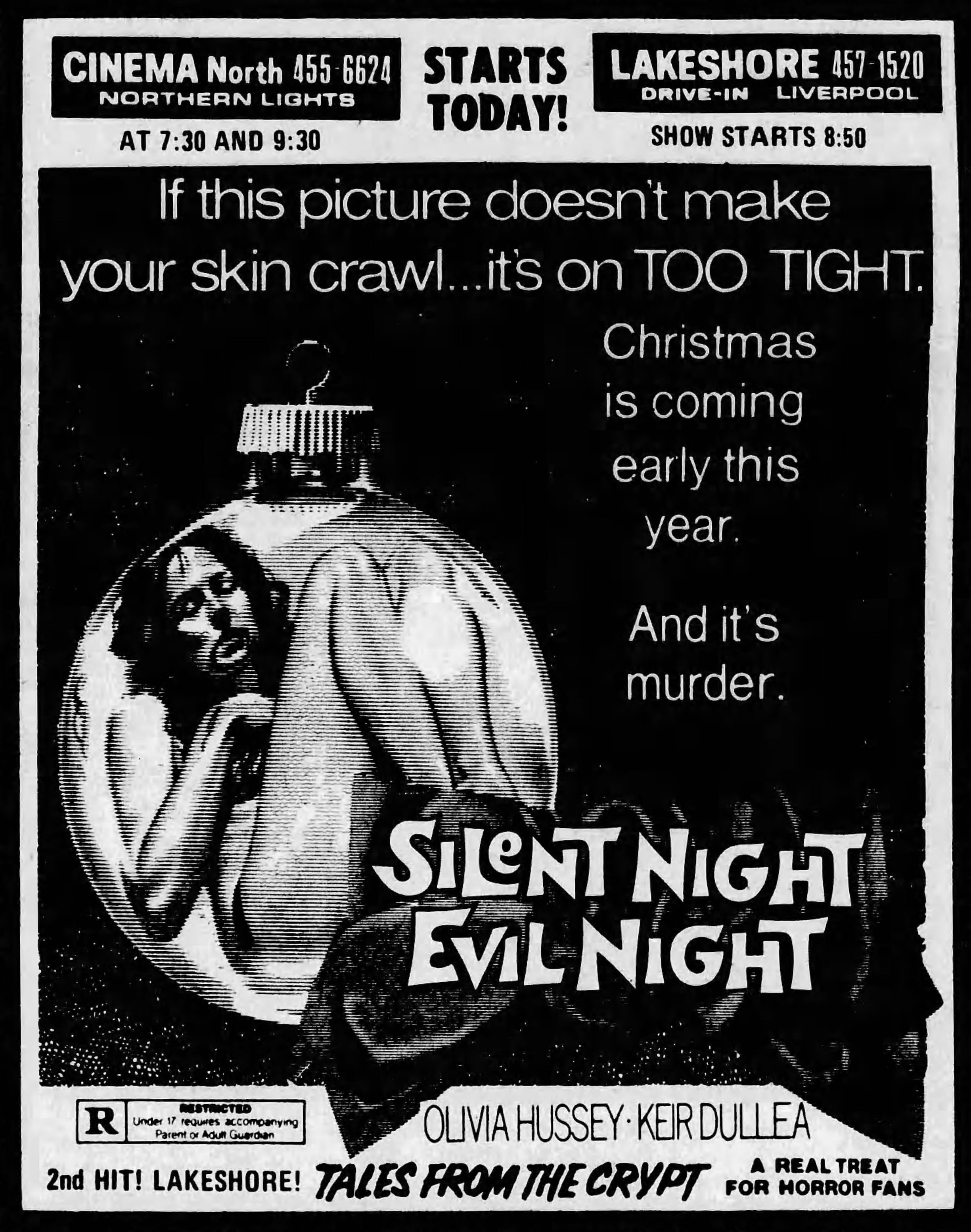
U.S. advertisement under the title Silent Night, Evil Night

Black Christmas was distributed in Canada by Ambassador Film Distributors and released in the Greater Toronto and Hamilton Area on October 11, 1974. It opened in Vancouver, Edmonton, and Calgary on November 22, 1974, and in Montreal on December 26, 1974.

In the United States, the film was released in May 1975 by Warner Bros., who initially issued it under the alternate title Silent Night, Evil Night due to fears that the original title would mislead audiences into believing the film was a blaxploitation picture. Warner Bros. retracted the title after the initial release, restoring it to Black Christmas for subsequent screenings. The film was re-released in select theaters in Los Angeles under its original title on August 6, 1975. The released expanded to other major U.S. cities through October 1975, including Austin, Chicago, Miami, New York City, and Portland, Oregon.

In the United Kingdom, the film was released in London on September 25, 1975.

To commemorate the film's 50th anniversary, a theatrical re-release for the film was held from December 7–22, 2024 in select cinemas across the United States, in a restored 4K format for the first time from the original camera negative.

=== Marketing ===
For its second U.S. theatrical run, Warner Bros. devised a marketing gimmick in which individuals could call a publicized telephone number which responded with an automated, sinister message promoting the film. The phone number received over 10,000 calls in the New York City area within 24 hours of its publication, tying up the studio's phone line and resulting in the New York Telephone Company requesting them to retract the promotional materials advertising the number. Warner Bros. complied, and also cancelled a planned promotional event in which two women dressed in Santa suits were to hand out cards with the number on the streets of Manhattan.

=== Television programming ===
The film, under the title Stranger in the House, was set to make its network television premiere on Saturday night, January 28, 1978, on NBC's weekly "Saturday Night at the Movies". Two weeks prior to its premiere, the Chi Omega sorority house on the campus of Florida State University in Tallahassee was the scene of a double murder in which two Chi Omega sisters, asleep in their beds, were bludgeoned to death. The killer then went to a nearby room in the sorority house and violently attacked two more sleeping students, who survived. The killer was later identified as Ted Bundy, who was executed for this and other homicides on January 24, 1989.

A few days before the film was set to premiere on network television Florida's then-Governor Reubin Askew contacted NBC President Robert Mullholland to request the movie not be shown due to its all-too-similar theme as the murders of sorority sisters by an unknown madman at the Chi Omega Sorority House. On Tuesday, January 24, NBC-TV gave several of its affiliates in Florida, Georgia, and Alabama, the option of showing an alternate film, Doc Savage: The Man of Bronze, in place of Stranger in the House. The report revealed that "the network said in a statement issued yesterday in New York City that it was responding to concern voiced by the affiliates because of the murder of two coeds this month in a sorority house at Florida State University in Tallahassee".

=== Home media ===
Warner Home Video first released Black Christmas on VHS in 1986. On August 6, 1999, Pioneer Home Entertainment released the film on LaserDisc.

Black Christmas has been released on DVD several times in North America. A 25th-anniversary edition was released in Canada on November 6, 2001, by Critical Mass. This edition only contains the theatrical trailer and an interview with John Saxon as bonus features. The following year, on December 3, 2002, Critical Mass released a Collector's Edition of the film on DVD with making-of documentaries, two audio commentary tracks, and reversible English and French cover artwork.

On December 5, 2006, Critical Mass released a third "Special Edition" DVD with a newly remastered transfer, two original scenes with newly uncovered vocal tracks, a new documentary on the making of the film, and cast and crew interviews. This edition was later released on Blu-ray by Somerville House on November 11, 2008.

Anchor Bay Entertainment released a Blu-ray and DVD in Canada, titled the "Season's Grievings Edition". It contains the same transfer of the film as the "Special Edition" release and all previous bonus content, plus the addition of a new documentary ("Black Christmas Legacy"), a 40th-anniversary panel from Fan Expo 2014, a new commentary track featuring Nick Mancuso as the character "Billy", a new retrospective booklet written by Rue Morgue magazine, and new packaging art by Gary Pullin (art director of Rue Morgue). This new edition was released on Blu-ray and DVD on November 24, 2015.

In the United States, Scream Factory released the film in a collector's edition Blu-ray on December 13, 2016, with a new transfer and new extras. The Scream Factory release collates all of the bonus materials from the previous releases by Critical Mass and Anchor Bay, and also features the 2006 Critical Mass restoration of the film in the bonus materials. Scream Factory also released the film in a collector's edition 4K Ultra HD and Blu-ray on December 6, 2022. Scream Factory reissued the 4K release with new steelbook packaging on December 9, 2025.

== Reception ==
=== Box office ===
The film grossed $143,000 from nine theatres in Toronto in its first two weeks and earned $1.3 million during its theatrical run in Canada. The film went on to become the third-highest-grossing Canadian film of all time in Canada with a gross of $2 million, behind The Apprenticeship of Duddy Kravitz (1974) and the French language Deux femmes en or (1970), directed by Claude Fournier.

Warner Bros., who had acquired distribution rights in the United States, estimated that the film would earn at least $7 million there. The film was released in the United States on December 20, 1974, under the alternate title Silent Night, Evil Night, but only earned $284,345 during its theatrical run due to competition from The Godfather Part II and The Man with the Golden Gun.

Warner Bros. re-released the film in Los Angeles in August 1975 under its original title, and it earned $86,340 in one week. Its theatrical run was extended to nineteen theatres. The film's successful run in Los Angeles and Chicago resulted in Warner Bros. expanding the film to seventy theatres for Halloween. However, the film only made $354,990 from those theatres, averaging $700 per theatre per day, causing fifty-eight of the locations to cancel their bookings. The film ended its U.S. theatrical run in December 1975 after making less than $1 million that year.

=== Critical response ===
==== Contemporary ====
Black Christmas garnered largely unfavorable reviews in its home country of Canada. The Globe and Mail's Martin Knelman gave the film an unflattering review, observing that director Clark's "klutzy inventiveness is boundless... Clark may not have much talent, but he certainly must have salesmanship. It's amazing how many familiar performers have been talked into risking their reputation by playing this material as if they believed it." Jamie Portman, writing for the Calgary Herald, lambasted the film as "trash", deeming the screenplay "inept, cliche-ridden and juvenile", summarizing the film as a "senseless piece of mayhem". Natalie Edwards of Cinema Canada offered some praise for the film, particularly for Kidder and Martin's performances, as well as the cinematography and use of locations, but was ambivalent of the film's themes, noting:

The satisfactions of a film in which upper middle-class females, sharp and sexy, are terrorized and brutally or gruesomely destroyed can be easily seen to appeal to all misogynists, insecure and frustrated men, and a thwarted and denied working class who resent college kids, liberated women, intellectual and particularly artistic males, and, quite possibly, the expense of Christmas.

A. H. Weiler of The New York Times called it "a whodunit that raises the question as to why was it made". Variety called the film "a bloody, senseless kill-for-kicks feature, [that] exploits unnecessary violence in a university sorority house operated by an implausibly alcoholic ex-hoofer. Its slow-paced, murky tale involves an obscene telephone caller who apparently delights in killing the girls off one by one, even the hapless house-mother". Gene Siskel of the Chicago Tribune gave the film 1.5 stars out of 4 and called it a "routine shocker" that "is notable only for indicating the kind of junk roles that talented actresses are forced to play in the movies".

Kevin Thomas of the Los Angeles Times was more favorable, noting: "Before it maddeningly overreaches in a gratuitously evasive ending, Black Christmas... is a smart, stylish Canadian-made little horror picture that is completely diverting... It may well be that its makers simply couldn't figure out how to end it".

==== Modern assessment ====
On the review aggregator website Rotten Tomatoes, 73% of 62 critics' reviews are positive. The website's consensus reads: "The rare slasher with enough intelligence to wind up the tension between bloody outbursts, Black Christmas offers fiendishly enjoyable holiday viewing for genre fans." Metacritic, which uses a weighted average, assigned the film a score of 65 out of 100, based on 9 critics, indicating "generally favorable" reviews.

Heidi Martinuzzi of Film Threat called the film "innovative" and praised the leading actresses, Olivia Hussey and Margot Kidder. TV Guide awarded the film three out of four stars, writing: "Although strictly standard fare, the material is elevated somewhat through Clark's skillful handling of such plot devices as obscene phone calls from the killer to the girls via the upstairs phone and a nicely handled twist ending, which provides a genuine shock". Author and film critic Leonard Maltin gave the film two and a half out of four stars calling it "bizarre" but also praised Kidder's performance as a standout. The Time Out film guide noted that the film "manages a good slice of old-fashioned suspense".

=== Accolades ===
Award/association	Year	Category	Recipient(s) and nominee(s)	Result	Ref.
Canadian Film Awards	1975	Best Feature Film	Black Christmas	Nominated	
Canadian Film Awards	1975	Best Sound Editing in a Feature	Kenneth Heeley-Ray	Won	
Canadian Film Awards	1975	Best Performance by a Lead Actress	Margot Kidder	Won	
Edgar Allan Poe Awards	1976	Best Motion Picture	Black Christmas	Nominated	
Saturn Awards	1975	Best Horror Film	Black Christmas	Nominated	

== Legacy ==
Black Christmas gained a cult following in the years after its original release, and is widely regarded by critics and film historians as one of the earliest slasher films. It brought together various tropes, like using point-of-view shots from the killer's perspective (common in earlier Italian giallo films), and so formulated a template for subsequent American slasher films. In particular, John Carpenter's Halloween (1978), which was apparently inspired by Clark suggesting what a Black Christmas sequel would be like.

Black Christmas has been included in multiple lists in various media outlets as one of the greatest horror films ever made. The film ranked No. 87 on Bravo's The 100 Scariest Movie Moments. It was ranked at No. 67 in IndieWire's The 100 Best Horror Movies of All Time, its entry stating that "the plot sounds formulaic, but Black Christmas remains timeless thanks to its terrifying and elusive killer, 'Billy', whose backstory is never revealed, as well as a foreboding ending that doesn't offer much hope for the film's Final Girl". Thrillist's Scott Weinberg, in his article The 75 Best Horror Movies of All Time, ranked the film at No. 48. Paul Schrodt of Esquire placed the film at No. 23 in his list of the 50 Best Horror Films of All Time. In 2017, Complex magazine named Black Christmas the 2nd-best slasher film of all time. The following year, Paste listed it the 3rd-best slasher film of all time, while also placing the character Jess Bradford at #1 in their list of "20 Best 'Final Girls' in Horror Movie History".

While director Clark maintained he did not intend for the film to have political leanings, critics have noted Black Christmas is nonetheless a feminist film for its treatment of female characters—particularly Jess having agency and making the choice to have an abortion—and its portrayal of casual misogyny (as when the police initially fail to take the sorority's concerns about the phone calls and Clare's absence seriously). Film critic Tim Dirks of the film-review website Filmsite.org added the film to his list of films featuring the "Greatest Film Plot Twists, Film Spoilers and Surprise Endings", based on the film's major plot twists—the revelation that the real killer was hidden inside the unsearched attic, and Jess' implied murder.

Hussey told Bravo during an interview about their 100 Scariest Movie Moments series, that when she met Steve Martin for the first time, he told her that she starred in one of his favorite films of all time. Hussey initially thought he was referring to Romeo and Juliet, but was surprised when Martin said it was Black Christmas and that he had seen the film 27 times.

== Related works ==
=== Novelization ===
A novelization of the film written by Lee Hays was published in 1976 by Popular Library. The book follows roughly the same plot, but sticks with Roy Moore's original script. Because of this, the novel ends up fleshing out the characters more, adding scenes and lines of dialogue that were initially cut from the film's final script, and giving the Pi Kappa Sigma sorority more backstory.

=== Remakes ===
Black Christmas has been remade on two separate occasions, with the films differing significantly from the original.

The first remake was written and directed by Glen Morgan and was released on December 25, 2006, by Dimension Films and MGM Distribution Co. It is loosely based on the original film, containing more graphic content and a focus into the past of Billy. Andrea Martin was the only original cast member to appear in the film, and Clark served as an executive producer.

The second remake was directed and co-written by Sophia Takal, and starring Imogen Poots and Cary Elwes. The film was released on December 13, 2019, by Universal Pictures.

=== Fan films ===
A short fan film funded through an Indiegogo campaign was released on YouTube and Vimeo with the title It's Me, Billy, in 2021. It is billed as an "unofficial sequel" to the original film and is set fifty years after the original, following the granddaughter of Jess Bradford. The film was written, produced, and directed by Dave McRae and Bruce Dale and acts as a concept for a feature film as well as the first part of a two-part story.

In 2023, crowdfunding for It's Me, Billy Chapter 2 started on Indiegogo and that Olivia Hussey and Lynne Griffin, who starred in Black Christmas, were in the cast. Once again directed by Canadian filmmakers Dave McRae and Bruce Dale, Chapter 2 is a direct sequel to It's Me, Billy (2021) picking up immediately where that film ended. However, Hussey pulled out of the project for health reasons and was replaced by Lisa Kovack. It's Me, Billy Chapter 2 was released on October 11, 2024, to commemorate the 50th anniversary of when the original Black Christmas was first released in Canada.

== See also ==
- List of films featuring home invasions
- Holiday horror
- List of films set around Christmas

== Sources ==
- Brunvand, Jan Harold (2012). Encyclopedia of Urban Legends. Santa Barbara, California: ABC-CLIO. ISBN 978-1-59884-720-8.
- Crump, William D. (2013). The Christmas Encyclopedia (3rd ed.). Jefferson, North Carolina: McFarland & Company. ISBN 978-1-476-60573-9.
- Cullen, Del; Patterson, Hannah; Allon, Yoram, eds. (2000). Contemporary North American Film Directors. New York City, New York: Wallflower Press. ISBN 978-1-903-36452-9.
- DuPée, Matthew C. (2022). A Scary Little Christmas: A History of Yuletide Horror Films, 1972-2020. Jefferson, North Carolina: McFarland & Company. ISBN 978-1-476-64540-7.
- Jenkins, Philip (2008). Decade of Nightmares: The End of the Sixties and the Making of Eighties America. Oxford, England: Oxford University Press. ISBN 978-0-195-34158-4.
- Koven, Mikel J. (2008). Film, Folklore, and Urban Legends. Lanham, Maryland: Scarecrow Press. ISBN 978-0-8108-6025-4.
- Maltin, Leonard (2013). Leonard Maltin's 2014 Movie Guide. New York City, New York: Penguin Press. ISBN 978-0-451-41810-4.
- Markusen, Bruce (2021). Hosted Horror on Television: The Films and Faces of Shock Theater, Creature Features and Chiller Theater. Jefferson, North Carolina: McFarland & Company. ISBN 978-1-476-68461-1.
- Muir, John Kenneth (2011). Horror Films of the 1970s. Jefferson, North Carolina: McFarland & Company. ISBN 978-0-786-49156-8.
- Rist, Peter, ed. (2001). Guide to the Cinema(s) of Canada. Westport, Connecticut: Greenwood Publishing Group. ISBN 978-0-313-29931-5.
- Turner, D. John, ed. (1987). Canadian Feature Film Index: 1913-1985. Canadian Film Institute. ISBN 0660533642.
- Nowell, Richard (2011). Blood Money: A History of the First Teen Slasher Film Cycle. New York City, New York: Continuum International Publishing Group. ISBN 978-1-441-12496-8.
- Paszylk, Bartłomiej (2009). The Pleasure and Pain of Cult Horror Films: An Historical Survey. Jefferson, North Carolina: McFarland. ISBN 978-0-786-43695-8. OCLC 956654338.
- Thrower, Stephen (2017). "Ringing the Changes: Bob Clark's Black Christmas". In Corupe, Paul; Janisse, Kier-La (eds.). Yuletide Terror: Christmas Horror on Film and Television. Toronto, Ontario: Spectacular Optical. pp. 6–23. ISBN 978-0-992-14633-7.
