= Code Red DVD =

American home entertainment company

Code Red
- Industry: Home video, motion pictures
- Headquarters: Seattle, Washington, U.S. Glendale, California, U.S.
- Key people: Bill Norton Olsen
- Products: DVD, Blu-ray

Code Red DVD was an independent American home entertainment company specializing in retro exploitation and horror films, operated by Bill Norton Olsen. The company originally began releasing films on DVD in 2006, and later began releasing and re-releasing titles on Blu-ray.

== History ==
Code Red was begun in 2006 by president Bill Norton Olsen. The company's first release was Don't Go in the Woods... Alone!, released on October 24, 2006. The Fabulous Journey to the Center of the Earth (1978) was the company's second release, followed by the horror film Devil Times Five (1974). Some of the early Code Red releases were purchased from Media Blasters.

In 2010, the website RetroSlashers reported that Code Red would be shutting down, and Olsen later stated that he had run out of money and was facing putting up his home in order to keep the company running.

== Series ==
Code Red employs several series in its catalogue, which feature both standalone and double feature releases. The company's running series include:

- Exploitation Cinema
- Maria's "B" Movie Mayhem (hosted by Maria Kanellis)
- Post-Apocalyptic Collection
- Roger Corman's Post-Nuke Collection

== DVD releases ==
Title	Release dates	# Copies	Exclusive
Alice Goodbody	August 17, 2010		
Alice in Wonderland	March 15, 2011		
The Babysitter / The Topless Story	October 5, 2012		
Bad Girls' Dormitory	September 30, 2008		
The Being / Cop Killers	February 22, 2011		
Beyond the Door	September 16, 2008		
The Black Klansman	January 18, 2011		
Blade / Ring of Death	August 23, 2011		
Blood Mania / Land of the Minotaur	June 19, 2012		
Boardinghouse	April 29, 2008		
Brute Corps	May 31, 2011		
Between the Covers / Swinging Wives	August 12, 2008		
Butcher, Baker, Nightmare Maker	July 14, 2014		
Caged Men	November 22, 2011		
Can I Do It... 'Til I Need Glasses?	May 13, 2008		
The Carrier	October 29, 2010		
Challenge the Dragon / The Needle Avenger	March 16, 2010		
Changes	August 23, 2013		
The Chilling	June 24, 2008		
Choke Canyon	June 23, 2009		
The Curious Case of the Campus Corpse	July 22, 2008		
Curse of the Blue Lights	August 15, 2013		
Cut-Throats Nine / Joshua	August 16, 2011		
A Day at the Beach	September 9, 2008		
The Dead Are Alive	July 13, 2010		
The Dead Pit	June 17, 2008		
Death Journey	March 16, 2010		
Derby	February 17, 2009		
Devil Times Five	May 6, 2008		
Don't Go in the Woods... Alone!	April 29, 2008		
Doom Asylum	July 15, 2008		
Evilspeak	August 15, 2013		BigCartel
Exploitation Cinema: Deliver Us from Evil / The Fox Affair	August 25, 2009		
Exploitation Cinema: Supervan / Jailbait Babysitter	March 8, 2011		
Exploitation Cinema: Teenage Graffiti / Teenage Mother	August 25, 2009		
Exploitation Cinema: Where Time Began / Encounter with the Unknown	March 8, 2011		
Exploitation Cinema: Don't Go in the Woods... Alone! / The Forest	May 26, 2009		
Exploitation Cinema: Lonely Wives / Sorry, Wrong Bedroom	May 18, 2010		
Exploitation Cinema: Mark of the Witch / Devil Times Five	May 26, 2009		
Exploitation Cinema: Wacky Taxi / Superargo	May 18, 2010		
Exterminators of the Year 3000	September 21, 2010		
The Fabulous Journey to the Center of the Earth	October 31, 2008		
Final Exam	October 1, 2008		
The Forest	November 7, 2006		
Ghostkeeper	April 29, 2012		
Girls in Chains	November 25, 2008		
God's Bloody Acre / Tomcats	July 12, 2011		
The Godfather Squad / Bruce's Last Battle	August 23, 2011		
Gold of the Amazon Women	September 15, 2013		
Group Marriage	February 8, 2011		
Haunted	September 20, 2011		
Heated Vengeance	October 30, 2012		
Horror High	August 10, 2010		
Hot Moves	October 21, 2008		
How to Score with the Girls / White Rat	February 22, 2011		
If He Hollers, Let Him Go!	August 18, 2013		
Inn of the Damned / Night of Fear	March 27, 2016		BigCartel
Invasion of the Blood Farmers / Silent Night, Bloody Night	September 3, 2013		
James Bryan Film Festival: Escape to Passion / The Dirtiest Game in the World / I Love You I Love You Not	July 5, 2011		
Julie Darling	August 2, 2011		
Just Before Dawn	November 5, 2013		BigCartel
Killer's Delight	August 28, 2008		
The Last Chase	April 12, 2011		
Light Blast	October 12, 2010		
A Long Ride from Hell	January 11, 2011		
Love Me Deadly	May 20, 2008		
Love Me Deadly / Campus Corpse	September 13, 2011		
Mace	September 17, 2013		
Madman	September 28, 2010		
Marcy	May 17, 2011		
Mardi Gras Massacre	September 27, 2011		
Maria's Kung Fu Mayhem: Angry Dragon / Dragon Never Dies / Fist of the Double K / Mandarin Magician / Revenge of the Dragon	March 27, 2016		BigCartel
Mausoleum / Blood Song	October 14, 2008		
Mean Johnny Barrows	March 16, 2010		
Messiah of Evil	October 27, 2009		BigCartel
Murder Run / Unhinged	July 22, 2014		
Night Child	September 7, 2010		BigCartel
Night of the Demon	October 11, 2011		
Night of the Dribbler	September 8, 2009		
The Night the Prowler / Devil Woman	March 27, 2016		BigCartel
Nightmare	July 26, 2011		
The People Who Own the Dark	July 18, 2012		BigCartel
Pets	October 13, 2009		
Police Connection	August 8, 2013		
Posse From Heaven / S.L.I.P.	September 3, 2013		
The Possessed / Demon Witch Child	March 19, 2013		
Primal Rage	July 13, 2010		
Quadroon	March 16, 2010		
Red Light in the White House / I'm Going to be Famous	March 27, 2016		BigCartel
The Redeemer: Son of Satan	October 19, 2010		
Retribution	September 12, 2012		
Riot on 42nd Street / Bad Girl Dormitory	November 8, 2011		
Riot on 42nd Street	January 12, 2010		
Rituals	April 19, 2011		
Rivals	November 9, 2010		
Running Hot	February 24, 2009		
Running Scared	September 26, 2017		
Saturn Drive-In: Velvet Trap / Hot Nights on the Campus	October 13, 2009		
Savage Streets	September 24, 2008		BigCartel
Scream	February 16, 2010		
Scream / Barn of the Naked Dead	September 27, 2011		
Seeds of Evil / Touch of Satan	February 2, 2013		
Sinner's Blood	October 26, 2012		
Slithis	June 1, 2010		
Sole Survivor	April 1, 2008		
Spasms	March 27, 2016		BigCartel
Stanley	October 4, 2011		
The Statue	May 18, 2010		
Stigma	June 8, 2010		
Stoney / The Killer Likes Candy	August 16, 2011		
The Strangeness	August 18, 2009		BigCartel
Stunt Rock	August 25, 2009		
The Super Weapon	March 27, 2016		BigCartel
Sweet Sixteen	October 14, 2008		
Swingin' Sorority	August 17, 2013		
Teenage Hitchhikers	June 29, 2010		
Teenage Hitchhikers / Teenage Tramp	October 25, 2011		
Terminal Island	September 14, 2010		
Terror Circus	March 31, 2009		
Terror Circus / Schoolgirls in Chains	May 17, 2011		
Texas Detour	March 27, 2016		BigCartel
Trapped	August 4, 2009		
The Undertaker	October 5, 2010		
The Unknown Comedy Special	April 5, 2011		
The Unseen	August 19, 2008		BigCartel
Vampire at Midnight	October 18, 2011		
The Vampires Night Orgy / Dr. Jekyll vs. the Werewolf	March 1, 2013		
Virginity	August 17, 2013		
The Visitor	November 19, 2010		
Voices from Beyond	November 5, 2013		BigCartel
Voodoo Dolls / Madonna	October 25, 2011		
The Weekend Murders	August 11, 2009		
Wild Malibu Weekend	September 6, 2011		
The Witchmaker	July 5, 2011		
The Working Girls	February 15, 2011		

== Blu-ray releases ==
Current Releases
Spine #	Title	Release date	# Copies	Exclusive
01	The Electric Chair	December 3, 2016	1000	DiabolikDVD / BigCartel
02	Voices from Beyond	November 5, 2013		DiabolikDVD / BigCartel
03	Nail Gun Massacre	April 26, 2014		BigCartel
04	Just Before Dawn (1981 film)	November 5, 2013		BigCartel
04	Savage Streets	April 26, 2014		SAE
05	The Redeemer: Son of Satan	April 26, 2014	1020	BigCartel
06	Nightmare	June 13, 2014	1000	DiabolikDVD / BigCartel
07	Deadly Hero	December 22, 2015	1000	DiabolikDVD / BigCartel
08	Family Honor	July 7, 2016		BigCartel
09	The Black Gestapo	May 24, 2016		SAE
10	The Weekend Murders	April 17, 2016	1000	DiabolikDVD / BigCartel
11	White Ghost	February 5, 2016		SAE
60	Devil Times Five	June 5, 2016		DiabolikDVD
41	The Devil's Wedding Night	May 7, 2015		BigCartel
37	Dune Warriors (1991)	December 2, 2015		SAE
18	The Eerie Midnight Horror Show	December 10, 2014	1000	BigCartel
44	Equalizer 2000 (1987)	June 30, 2015		SAE
	Evilspeak	May 13, 2014		Scream Factory
52	Eye in the Labyrinth (1972)	February 5, 2016		SAE
07	Family Honor	July 7, 2016	1000	DiabolikDVD / BigCartel
	Final Exam	May 13, 2014		Scream Factory
59	The Forest	June 5, 2016		DiabolikDVD
71	Headhunter	July 7, 2016	1000	DiabolikDVD / BigCartel
13	House on the Edge of the Park		1500	DiabolikDVD / BigCartel
04	Just Before Dawn	November 5, 2013		BigCartel
53	A Knife for the Ladies (1973)	February 5, 2016		SAE
20	Lady Stay Dead	December 23, 2014	1000	BigCartel
34	Legacy of Satan / Blood	August 24, 2015		SAE
37	Love Butcher (1975)	October 20, 2015	1000	BigCartel
30	The Man with Two Heads (1972)	November 29, 2014		BigCartel
58	Maniac!	July 22, 2016	1000	DiabolikDVD / BigCartel
12	Mary, Mary, Bloody Mary	April 28, 2014		SAE
64	Mardi Gras Massacre	July 28, 2016	1000	DiabolikDVD / BigCartel
55	Mean Johnny Barrows	May 24, 2016	1000	DiabolikDVD / BigCartel
17	Messiah of Evil	October 27, 2014		BigCartel
03	Nail Gun Massacre	April 26, 2014		SAE
70	Necromancy	July 7, 2016	1000	DiabolikDVD / BigCartel
11	Neon Maniacs	April 26, 2014		SAE
48	Night Child	May 7, 2015		BigCartel
62	Nightfall (1988)	June 14, 2016	1000	DiabolikDVd / BigCartel
06	Nightmare	June 13, 2014		SAE
40	The Obsessed One (1974)	May 7, 2015		BigCartel
19	The People Who Own the Dark	December 9, 2015		BigCartel
50	Pit Stop	July 7, 2015		KinoLorber
54	The Police Connection	April 17, 2016	1000	BigCartel
33	The Rats Are Coming! The Werewolves Are Here!	October 20, 2015		SAE
05	The Redeemer: Son of Satan	May 26, 2014	1000	SAE
47	Retribution	May 26, 2015	2000	SAE
28	Revenge of the Cheerleaders	October 27, 2014	1000	BigCartel
04 / 000	Savage Streets	April 26, 2014		BigCartel
49	Shakma	May 26, 2015	3000	SAE
22	The Sicilian Connection	August 24, 2015		SAE
51	Silk (1986)	December 2, 2015		SAE
43	The Sisterhood (1988)	June 30, 2015		SAE
45	Spontaneous Combustion (1990)	May 26, 2015	3000	SAE
38	The Strangeness	October 2, 2015	1000	BigCartel
16	Sweet Sixteen	August 11, 2015	1700	SAE
46	Terror Circus	October 20, 2015		SAE
31	Torture Dungeon (1970)	November 29, 2014		BigCartel
15	Trapped	March 25, 2016	1500	SAE
39	Trick or Treats (1982)	August 11, 2015	1050	SAE
61	Truck Stop Women	June 5, 2016		DiabolikDVD
26	The Vampires Night Orgy	December 9, 2015		BigCartel
02	Voices from Beyond	November 5, 2013		SAE
09	Weekend Murders	April 17, 2016	1000	BigCartel
42	Wheels of Fire (1985)	June 30, 2015		SAE
10	White Ghost (1987)	February 5, 2016		SAE
25	Zombie Nightmare	November 24, 2015		SAE
300	Spasms			DiabolikDVD / BigCartel

Pending Blu-ray releases
Bucketlist #	Title	Release dates	# Copies	Exclusive
03	After the Fall of New York			
28	Beyond the Door			
18	Black Candles			
	Cocaine Wars			
19	Cut and Run			
17	The Dark			
05	Deadly Dreams			
11	Delirium			
	Ghostkeeper			
23	Group Marriage			
01	Hands of Steel			
	Happy Hell Night			
	Hide and Go Shriek			
15	Hot Moves			
20	In the Aftermath			
10	Ironmaster			
16	The Jigsaw Murders			
12	Kingdom of the Spiders			
09	Lord Shango			
	Mind Ripper			
26	Mission Kill (1983)			
24	Moonshine County Express			
04	Mutant			
	Nam's Angels			
06	One Dark Night			
21	Savage Attraction			
	Screams of a Winter Night			
	Slaughterhouse Rock			
25	Terminal Island			
27	Twisted Nightmare			
02	Revenge of the Dead			
22	The Working Girls			
