= Mardi Gras Massacre =

1978 American horror film directed by Jack Weis

- Theatrical release poster
- Directed by: Jack Weis
- Written by: Jack Weis
- Produced by: Jack Weis
- Starring: Curt Dawson; Gwen Arment; William Metzo; Laura Misch Owens
- Cinematography: Jack McGowan; Don Piel; Jack Weis
- Music by: Dennis Coffey; Mike Theodore
- Release date: February 11, 1978 (St. Louis)
- Running time: 95 minutes
- Country: United States
- Language: English

Mardi Gras Massacre is a 1978 American slasher film written and directed by Jack Weis. The film's plot follows a serial killer roaming the streets of New Orleans, Louisiana, sacrificing women to an Aztec goddess. It has been noted for its plot similarities to the 1963 film Blood Feast.

Mardi Gras Massacre is notable for its reputation as a "video nasty," having been banned in the United Kingdom upon its release and given an X rating in the United States.

== Plot ==
In New Orleans, a dapper and mysterious middle-aged man named John arrives at a bar searching for the "evilest" prostitute he can take home. He is directed to Shirley, who agrees to leave with him for $200. At his house, he asks her to lie on a table. She undresses, and John re-enters the room in a robe and wearing a mysterious metal mask. He begins massaging her and then ties her to the table and eviscerates her, removes her heart, and offers it on an altar in an Aztec sacrifice to the goddess Coatl, the "queen of evil."

Sergeant Frank Hebert and his partner, Sergeant Mayer, are assigned to Shirley's murder case after her body is found on train tracks in the city. When questioning other local prostitutes, Hebert meets Sherry and discovers from her that the man whom Shirley had left with the night she died wore an unusual gold ring. Frank soon becomes enamored of Sherry, a hooker with a heart of gold, and the two begin falling in love, which clouds Frank's focus on the investigation. Meanwhile, Frank's superiors urge him and Mayer to prevent the murders from being publicized in fear that it will hamper the impending Mardi Gras celebration.

Meanwhile, John continues to stalk local strip clubs and bars for further female victims. He performs the same ritual murder on another prostitute. At a different club, he attempts to court another dancer but is confronted in the street by her pimp, whom John brutally stabs to death before fleeing. At another club, John is propositioned by Catfish, an eccentric hippie who is also a pimp, who offers John one of his girls. In the dressing room of the club, Catfish arranges for 19-year-old dancer and prostitute Sissy to have sex with John to repay a debt.

At his apartment, John wines and dines Sissy with a meal of Chinese food at her request. However, when John prepares to perform his ritual murder of Sissy, he asks her how old she is, and learning she is 19 years old, he orders her to leave. Unaware of his plans, she insists that they complete their transaction. John then binds Sissy and proceeds with the ritual, murdering her.

Meanwhile, Sherry becomes enraged with Frank after learning he pocketed money found with Shirley's body and vows never to see him again. Sherry goes out for drinks at a local disco, where she gets into a drunken fight with another woman. Sergeant Mayer witnesses the incident and escorts Sherry back to her apartment. She tells Mayer she plans on leaving New Orleans as the annual Mardi Gras celebration begins the following day.

John meets Joe, a bartender, and offers him a large sum of money for three prostitutes for Fat Tuesday, during which he plans to provide three women to Coatl at once. One of the three Joe offers him is Sherry. John inebriates the women with pisco and prepares for the murder ritual. Meanwhile, Frank and Mayer are alerted to John's apartment by the Chinese food vendor who delivered there.

Frank and Mayer rush to the apartment and prevent the ritual, saving Sherry and the other two prostitutes. John flees via a fire escape and leads Frank and Mayer on a chase through the French Quarter, ending at the Governor Nicholls Street Wharf. There, John steals a police car and crashes it into the Mississippi River. When they pull the vehicle from the water, they find the ritual mask, but John's body is nowhere to be seen.

== Cast ==
- Curt Dawson as Sergeant Frank Hebert
- Gwen Arment as Sherry
- William Metzo as John
- Ronald Tanet as Sergeant Mayer
- Laura Misch Owens as Shirley Anderson
- Cathryn Lacey as Disco Girl #1
- Nancy Dancer as Disco Girl #2

== Release ==
Mardi Gras Massacre was released in the United States in 1983, five years after its completion and was given an X rating by the MPAA. It opened in St. Louis, Missouri on February 11, 1983, and in Kansas City on March 26, 1983, as a triple-bill with Sorceress and Humanoids.

The film was on the UK government's list of Video Nasties in the 1980s. In 2022, the film was finally submitted to the British Board of Film Classification and received an uncut 18 certificate for UK release.

=== Home media ===
The film was released on DVD by Code Red in September 2011 and was later released on Blu-ray in 2016. Severin Films announced they will be releasing a new Blu-ray edition of the film in April 2022. While initially made for sale on their website, the Blu-ray release by Severin was subsequently removed from their online store; as of July 2022, the release date for the Blu-ray was pushed back to December 27, 2022. It was ultimately released on February 7, 2023.

== Novelization ==
A novelization by Brad Carter was published by Severin Films in 2024.

== Sources ==
- Campbell, Ramsey (2008). The Grin of the Dark. Tor. ISBN 978-0-765-31939-5.
- Rockoff, Adam (2002). Going to Pieces: The Rise and Fall of the Slasher Film, 1978-1986. McFarland. ISBN 978-0-7864-9192-6.
