= Nail Gun Massacre =

1980s American rape-and-revenge slasher film

- Promotional artwork
- Directed by: Bill Leslie; Terry Lofton
- Screenplay by: Terry Lofton
- Produced by: Terry Lofton
- Starring: Beau Leland; Michelle Meyer; Sebrina Lawless; Monica Lawless
- Cinematography: Bill Leslie
- Music by: Whitey Thomas
- Production company: Futuristic Films
- Distributed by: Magnum Entertainment
- Release date: January 1987
- Running time: 84 minutes
- Country: United States
- Language: English
- Budget: $50,000

Nail Gun Massacre is an American rape-and-revenge slasher film written by Terry Lofton and directed by Lofton and Bill Leslie. It follows a young doctor and a sheriff seeking a killer in a motorcycle helmet who is murdering locals with a nail gun.

Filmed in Lofton's native Dallas region in 1985 on a budget of $50,000, Lofton utilized locations in the region, including his grandparents' general store. The film was released direct-to-video by Magnum Entertainment in 1987. It has received numerous DVD and Blu-ray releases and developed a cult following in the years since its original release.

== Plot ==
At a construction site in east Texas, six men gang rape Linda Jenkins. Five months later, a person in camouflage clothing and black motorcycle helmet kills one of the rapists with a nail gun. One month later another rapist, Mark, cuts some wood with his friend Brad. As Brad urinates, the killer shoots him in the crotch and stomach. As Mark revs up the chainsaw, the killer sneaks up behind him and shoots him in the back of the neck. Mark falls and the chainsaw severs his hand.

When Doc, the town doctor and coroner, arrives at the crime scene, the sheriff shows him the bodies. The doctor mentions that three bodies have been found on Old Lady Bailey's property. The sheriff asks the wife of the first murder victim if her husband was a carpenter, and he leaves to call the "meat wagon."

The killer picks up a hitchhiker, then shoots him in the stomach, causing him to jump out of the moving vehicle. He then stops the car and kills the hitchhiker. The sheriff and Doc are called to the hardware store where a young woman was found nailed behind the store. Minutes later, they are called to the road outside of town where the hitchhiker was nailed to the concrete in the middle of the road.

Maxine, John and Tom are eating at a diner where she reveals Old Bailey let them stay in a house for free because someone was murdered there. The next day, the trio buys lumber from the lumber yard to fix the house. Hal and Ben arrive with their girlfriends Ann and Trish, to ask the owner, Bubba, for a job. He tells them of Maxine's place and the group leaves. After they leave, Linda shows up and asks Bubba if the two men were construction workers.

At Maxine's place, the group sees no one at home, and sit on a blanket for a picnic. Hal and Ann go for a walk in the woods and have sex. They are killed and nailed to a tree by the killer. Trish urges Ben to look for them. The killer nails Ben's hands to a tree. Maxine, John and Tom return to the house. John comforts a frightened Trish. John and Tom discover the bodies of Hal, Ben, and Ann and call the Sheriff. They unload the lumber from the truck and Maxine voices her worries of the killer. They also find their nail gun missing.

The next day, two carpenters are working on a house when they playfully shoot at each other with nail guns. When they go back into the partially constructed house, the killer shoots one in the head. The killer, speaking with a distorted voice, tells the other carpenter to think back six months ago. When the carpenter mentions the raping, the killer kills him. The killer then murders a couple making out on the hood of their car, and a family man in a suburban house.

After following various leads, the Sheriff eventually realizes six of the victims were construction workers who worked at a construction site. Six month ago, Linda Jenkins, now established to be Bubba's sister, was gang-raped by the six construction workers after delivering supplies at the site. The six rapists walked away thanks to the lack of evidence. That evening, two women walking in the nearby woods are attacked and killed.

The next morning, Doc calls Linda and asks to speak to Bubba, but she hangs up. Doc drives over to the lumber yard and confronts Linda, who tells him Bubba is out driving his hearse. Doc and Linda drive along the road and find the hearse and give chase. Soon, the sheriff joins them and the chases lead to a textile factory. The killer exits the car and runs, pursued by Sheriff and Doc. They chase the killer through the factory to the limestone mounds. The killer climbs up a crane, but slips and falls to his death. Linda walks up to the dead killer and removes his helmet, revealing him to be Bubba. The killings now over, Doc walks away with the traumatized Linda.

== Cast ==
- Rocky Patterson as Doctor Rocky Jones
- Ron Queen as Sheriff Thomas
- Beau Leland as Bubba Jenkins
- Michelle Meyer as Linda Jenkins
- Sebrina Lawless as Mary Sue Johnson
- Monica Lawless as Bobbi Jo Johnson
- Jerry Nelson as Leroy Johnson
- Mike Coady as Mark

Thomas Freylac provides the voice of the killer.

== Production ==
Prior to directing the film, writer and director Terry Lofton was a stuntman on The Dukes of Hazzard in the 1980s. He wrote the 80-page screenplay for Nail Gun Massacre, and managed to acquire $50,000 to shoot the project. Because of its small budget, Lofton was forced to shorten the screenplay to approximately 25 pages.

Nail Gun Massacre was shot in Texas over a period of three weeks. Lofton had originally envisioned the film as a serious horror film, but once shooting began, decided to incorporate dark humor into the proceedings. Filming took place primarily in the Dallas and Seagoville area where he was raised, and Lofton's own grandparents' general store is featured in the film. His grandmother appears in the film as the general store proprietor.

== Release ==
Reel Movies, an independent production company in Dallas, acquired the film and screened it in May 1986 at a film market during the Cannes Film Festival.

The film was released direct-to-video by Magnum Entertainment in January 1987. The film was not released in the United States theatrically. Lofton later produced a making-of the film in 2005 titled Nail. It was released on DVD by Synapse Films in 2005. The independent home media company Frightmare Video released a limited edition VHS of the film in 2012 in retro clamshell packaging.

Following Lofton's death in 2011, Loyd Cryer, with whom Lofton had a relationship, collaborated with Code Red for a limited edition Blu-ray that was released on April 26, 2014. In the United Kingdom, a Blu-ray release by 88 Films followed in 2015. A limited edition mediabook Blu-ray and DVD set with two cover art options was issued in Germany on March 22, 2019 by CMV Laservision.

Terror Vision released the film in 4K UHD Blu-ray format in 2024, limited to 8,000 units.

== Reception ==
A reviewer credited as "Lor." of Variety on the Magnum Entertainment video cassette on May 2, 1987. "Lor." referred to the film as an amateurish horror feature", noting that acting and technical credits were poor, stating that the premise "proves to be funny, realistic blood effects are the pic's raison d'être".

TV Guide was given one out of four stars rating. In his book overviewing of splatter films of the 1980s, Scott Aaron Stine described the film as an exercise in "low-rent filmmaking" and a "typically lame slasher flick". The review concluded that the film was an "inexcusable sexist tripe that will only appeal to indiscriminate splatterpunks".

DVD Talk's Adam Tyner gave the film a grade of 1½ out of 5, and concluded, "Y'know, if I watch something and have a genuinely good time with it, even if it's for all the wrong reasons, I can't really consider it a bad movie. It's not quite the Troll 2 of slasher movies, but I had more fun with Nail Gun Massacre... laughing and screaming at my TV... than any other movie I've watched in a very long time". In a review for DVD Verdict, Paul Corupe heavily criticized the film, writing, "A sleazy slasher from the 'anything goes' VHS heyday of the early 1980s. Put on by Texas entrepreneur Terry Lofton. There are moments of unintentionally hilarious reprieve on display throughout the film."

== Legacy ==
Nail Gun Massacre developed a cult following in the years after its release, and was screened at the 2006 Texas Frightmare Weekend.

== Sources ==
- Albright, Brian (2012). Regional Horror Films, 1958-1990: A State-by-State Guide with Interviews. Jefferson, North Carolina: McFarland & Company. ISBN 978-1-476-60042-0.
- Armstrong, Kent Byron (2003). Slasher Films: An International Filmography, 1960 Through 2001. Jefferson, North Carolina: McFarland & Company. ISBN 978-0-786-41462-8.
- Kellerbach, Christopher N. (2019). Nail Gun Massacre (Blu-ray mediabook) (in German). Berlin, Germany: CMV Laservision. pp. 1–15.
- Lor. (1991). Variety's Film Reviews 1987-1988. Vol. 20. R. R. Bowker. There are no page numbers in this book. This entry is found under the header "May 6, 1987". ISBN 0-8352-2667-0.
- Lentz III, Harris M. (2012). Obituaries in the Performing Arts, 2011. Jefferson, North Carolina: McFarland & Company. ISBN 978-0-786-49134-6.
- Stine, Scott Aaron (2003). The Gorehound's Guide to Splatter Films of the 1980s. Jefferson, North Carolina: McFarland & Company. ISBN 978-1-476-61132-7.
