= The Forest (1982 film) =

- Theatrical poster
- Directed by: Don Jones
- Written by: Don Jones
- Produced by: Frank Evans; Don Jones
- Starring: Dean Russell; Michael Brody; Elaine Warner; John Batis; Ann Wilkinson; Jeanette Kelly; Tony Gee; Stafford Morgan; Marilyn Anderson; Corky Pigeon; Becki Burke
- Cinematography: Stuart Asbjornsen
- Edited by: Robert Berk; Don Jones
- Music by: Richard Hieronymus; Alan Oldfield
- Production company: Wide World of Entertainment
- Distributed by: Fury Films Ltd.
- Release date: January 9, 1982 (New York City)
- Running time: 85 minutes
- Country: United States
- Language: English
- Budget: $42,000

The Forest is a 1982 American supernatural slasher film directed, written, edited and produced by Don Jones and starring Gary Kent, Tomi Barrett and John Batis. The film was shot in Sequoia National Park in California in 1981.

== Plot ==
A middle-aged couple are hiking through the remote wilderness in the Sierra Nevada, when the wife becomes convinced someone is following them. Shortly after, an unseen assailant attacks the husband with a hunting knife, stabbing him to death. The killer then pursues his wife, and slits her throat.

Some time later, two Los Angeles couples— Steve and Sharon, and Charlie and Teddi—plan a camping trip to escape the city. Sharon and Teddi depart before their husbands, who plan to meet them later that evening. While hiking toward their planned camping spot, Sharon and Teddi find themselves in a sudden thunderstorm, and make a camp at the base of a waterfall. Unbeknownst to them, the ghosts of two young children, John and Jennifer, watch them from a nearby cave. Sharon and Teddi are horrified when an apparition of the children's dead mother appears before them, asking where her children are, before disappearing before their eyes. This causes Teddi to panic. Meanwhile, Steve and Charlie, who have been trailing after the women, become lost as night falls.

The ghosts of John and Jennifer visit their father, John Sr.—a cannibalistic hermit who lives in a cave and hunts hikers passing through the woods—and informs him that they saw two young women camping by the river. When John Sr. leaves to pursue the women, Sharon, who has fallen asleep, is awoken by the ghostly children, who warn her that their "daddy is coming." Sharon flees, leaving Teddi alone at the campsite. John arrives at the camp and stalks Teddi before killing her. Sharon manages to elude John by jumping into the river. Steve and Charlie, meanwhile, seek shelter in John's cave during a rainstorm; they are perplexed to find the cave furnished and with a fire-pit roasting a slab of meat. Moments later, they are confronted by the ghosts of John Jr. and Jennifer before their father arrives. Steve and Charlie are baffled when the children vanish, and John informs them they only "come to visit." John allows the men to stay in the cave, and offers them the meat—which, unbeknownst to them, is in fact Teddi's flesh.

John regales Steve and Charlie with the story of how his wife abused their children, John Jr. and Jennifer, and carried on numerous affairs with men. In the morning, Steve and Charlie separate to search for their wives. While climbing over rocks, Steve falls and breaks his leg. Meanwhile, the ghosts of the children awaken Sharon, warning her that their father is coming to hunt her. She heeds their warning, and flees. Later, the children confront Sharon again, and explain to her that they are in fact ghosts, and that their abusive mother still makes attempts to hurt them beyond the grave. They tell her how their father killed their mother and one of her lovers before fleeing with them into the woods. After some time, the children, depressed and in ill health, committed suicide together, which drove their father into a psychotic state.

As night falls, the children attempt to lead Sharon to the injured Steve. Meanwhile, Charlie is confronted by the ghost of the children's mother before John attacks him. The two get into a violent fight, but John manages to kill Charlie. In the morning, Sharon stumbles across John butchering Charlie's corpse. John threatens to kill Sharon, but the ghosts of the children persuade him not to, telling him Sharon is their friend. Sharon eventually stumbles across the injured Steve, who is being pursued by John, but Sharon manages to ambush John, stabbing him to death. The ghosts of the children bid Sharon and Steve farewell. Moments later, their mother's apparition appears, asking where they are, but she vanishes when Sharon tells her they are gone.

== Cast ==
- Dean Russell as Steve
- Tomi Barrett as Sharon
- John Batis as Charlie
- Ann Wilkinson as Teddi
- Gary Kent as John
- Jeanette Kelly as Mother
- Corky Pigeon as John Jr.
- Becki Burke as Jennifer
- Tony Gee as Plumber
- Stafford Morgan as Jack
- Marilyn Anderson as Jack's wife
- Jean Clark as Mechanic
- Don Jones as Forest Ranger

== Production ==
According to an interview with actor Gary Kent, writer-director Don Jones lost his house acquiring funding for the making of the film: "He hocked his house to make the film. He's one of the few directors ever that I know of, besides myself, who actually paid his deferments...When he finally got money from the film, he paid us first before he paid off his house."

== Release ==
The film was released theatrically in the United States through Fury Films Ltd., opening in New York City under the alternate title Terror in the Forest on December 9, 1983.

It was released as a video in the 1980s and 1990s by Prism Entertainment and Starmaker Video.

On November 7, 2006, Code Red released the film on DVD with an anamorphic widescreen transfer, a stills gallery, and commentary with director Don Jones and Gary Kent.

As a part of their Exploitation Cinema line, Code Red rereleased the film in 2009 as a double feature with Don't Go In The Woods. This release did not include the commentary or stills gallery, but retained the widescreen transfer.

== Reception ==
TV Guide awarded the film one out of four stars, writing: "This obscure low-budgeter gives the Friday the 13th formula a bit of a twist, introducing both a cannibal angle and ghosts. A human-flesh-eating madman terrorizes people in a patch of woods, haunted by the ghosts of his murdered wife and children. A poorly made effort that barely saw a theatrical release and is now available everywhere on videotape for less than 10 bucks." Todd Martin from HorrorNews.net gave the film a negative review, stating that the film was "boring, lame, and the death scenes left a lot to be desired". Hysteria Lives gave the film 1/5 stars, calling it "a grade Z, back-packing slash-a-thon which starts with too very wooden (but hey that's ok, it ties in nicely with the forest theme!), middle aged actors being offed by briefly glimpsed back wood loon." Brett Gallman from Oh, the Horror! wrote, "The Forest is an incoherent mess of a flick... There’s almost no redeeming value to the film, as the acting is terrible, the music is generic, and the direction is mediocre. I can somewhat praise the photography, as I have seen worse in these low budget slashers... Beyond this, you only have a half baked story about a cannibal man and his ghost kids that only registers on the unintentional comedy scale."
