= Lyle Waggoner =

American actor and model (1935–2020)

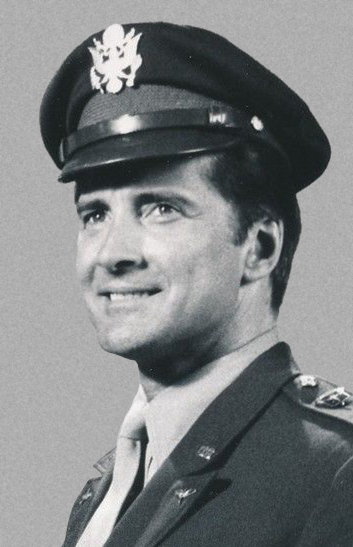
- Waggoner in a 1976 publicity photo for Wonder Woman
- Born: Lyle Wesley Waggoner; April 13, 1935; Kansas City, Kansas, U.S.
- Died: March 17, 2020 (aged 84); Westlake Village, California, U.S.
- Occupations: Actor; sculptor; model; presenter; salesman
- Years active: 1956–2005
- Spouse: Sharon Kennedy (m. 1961)
- Children: 2
- Military service
- Allegiance: United States
- Branch: United States Army
- Service years: 1953–1955

Lyle Wesley Waggoner (/ˈwæɡnər/ WAG-nər; April 13, 1935 – March 17, 2020) was an American actor, sculptor, presenter, travel trailer salesman and model, known for his work on The Carol Burnett Show from 1967 to 1974 and for playing the role of Steve Trevor and Steve Trevor Jr. in Wonder Woman from 1975 to 1979. In his later career he founded a company, Star Waggons, which rented luxury trailers to studios.

== Early life ==
Waggoner was born in Kansas City, Kansas, on April 13, 1935, the son of Myron and Marie (Isern) Waggoner, and spent part of his childhood in Excelsior Springs, Missouri. On an episode of The Carol Burnett Show, Waggoner stated he had three sisters and one brother. In 1953, he graduated from Kirkwood High School in Kirkwood, Missouri, and then studied briefly at Washington University in St. Louis. He then joined the United States Army, serving two years in West Germany as a radio operator.

Following his military discharge, Waggoner studied mechanical engineering in the junior executive program at the General Motors Institute of Technology. He then sold encyclopedias as a door-to-door salesman. He made his acting debut as a muscle man in a Kansas City production of Li'l Abner, after which he created a sales promotion organization that enabled him to make enough money to finance a trip to Los Angeles to pursue his acting career.

== Career ==
By the mid-1960s, Waggoner was appearing regularly in television and films, including in an episode of Gunsmoke (“The Wishbone” in 1966). He was a finalist for the title role in the TV series version of Batman, but lost the role to Adam West.

In 1967, he appeared in Catalina Caper (with Tommy Kirk, a former child actor trying to restart his career as a young adult), a film which would eventually be lampooned by Mystery Science Theater 3000. He also had a minor guest-starring role in the season-three episode "Deadliest of the Species" of the TV series Lost in Space.

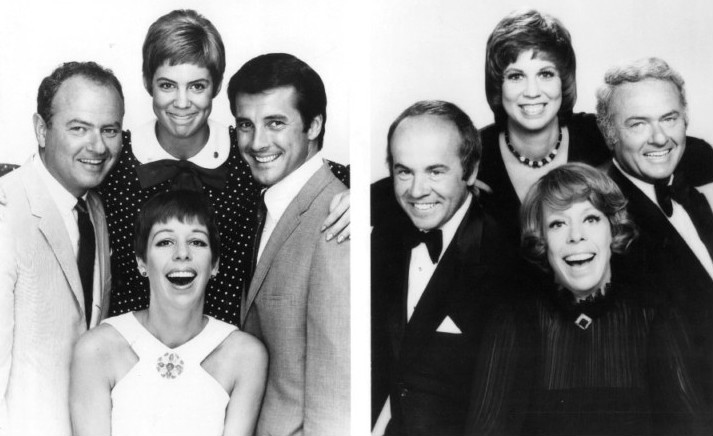
Left: Waggoner and other Carol Burnett Show cast members in 1967 (clockwise from bottom): Burnett, Harvey Korman, Vicki Lawrence, and Waggoner (right: the 1977 cast, with Tim Conway)

Also in 1967, Waggoner began a seven-year stint on The Carol Burnett Show, a comedy sketch and variety show, on which he appeared as an announcer and performer. In 1973, Waggoner posed semi-nude for a Playgirl centerfold. Waggoner left The Carol Burnett Show in 1974 in the hopes of advancing his career as a lead actor. His spot on the show was filled by frequent guest star Tim Conway (and his role as announcer by Ernie Anderson). He later appeared on some of the show's reunion specials.

In 1976, Waggoner was appointed "mayor" of Encino, California, by the local chamber of commerce. The "mayor" is not an actual government official as Encino is not an independent town but rather part of the city of Los Angeles; the post is an honorary "goodwill ambassador" position. In addition to Waggoner, other holders of the title have included Steve Allen, Mike Connors, Fred Travalena, Ronnie Schell, and Cesare Danova.

A year after leaving Carol Burnett, Waggoner landed the role of Steve Trevor for the pilot and first season of the television series Wonder Woman starring Lynda Carter. The series was initially set in World War II but when the subsequent two seasons advanced the timeline to the 1970s, Waggoner played Steve Trevor, Jr.

Waggoner also appeared in several TV movies and minor motion pictures during the 1970s and 1980s, often cast for "hunk" appeal. He made guest appearances on numerous television series including Charlie's Angels, The San Pedro Beach Bums, Happy Days, Mork & Mindy, The Golden Girls, Ellen, and most recently The War at Home. Waggoner also played at least three roles on The Love Boat, Fantasy Island, and Murder, She Wrote throughout their respective runs.

In 1979, while working on Wonder Woman, Waggoner discovered that the motorhome he was using during the production was rented by the studio from a nearby resident. Waggoner soon bought a fleet of motor homes at $50,000 apiece, renting them out to Hollywood productions for $400-$500 per week. Soon after he founded Star Waggons, a company that leased customized location trailers for use by the entertainment industry. He also started Zio Studio Services, the rental arm of Star Waggons. On September 1, 2021, Star Waggons and Zio Studio Services were sold to Hudson Pacific Properties for $222 million. Waggoner's sons, Jason and Beau, will continue to run these businesses for Hudson Pacific Properties. Waggoner retired from full-time acting to run Star Waggons, but made occasional appearances, often parodying his earlier image (The Naked Truth, That '70s Show, and Return to the Batcave).

In 1990, Waggoner co-produced and appeared in a consumer-product show called Consumer America with co-host Shawn Bruner. The series featured novel national products from self-help to home goods and lasted for about two seasons.

In 1993, Waggoner was the host of an infomercial, "Let's Talk With Lyle Waggoner", which advertised "Y-Bron", supposedly a natural product that would cure male impotence. The Scottsdale, Arizona-based Twin Star was later fined $1.5 million for unsubstantiated claims about Y-Bron.

== Personal life ==
Waggoner was married to Sharon Kennedy, an actress, financial consultant, and realtor. They married in 1961 and had two sons. He resided near Jackson, Wyoming, where he was a sculptor. His works can be seen at galleries in Jackson Hole, Wyoming, and Lander, Wyoming.

== Death ==
Waggoner died in his home in the Los Angeles area at the age of 84 on March 17, 2020, from cancer. His memorial services were held at Bel-Air Bay Club in Pacific Palisades, California and Jackson, Wyoming's George Washington Memorial Park.

== Filmography ==
=== Film ===
Year	Title	Role	Notes
1966	Swamp Country	Deputy Mel	
1967	Catalina Caper	Angelo	Alternate title: Never Steal Anything Wet
1967	Journey to the Center of Time	Alien (as Lyle Waggner)	
1972	Love Me Deadly	Alex Martin	
1978	Zero to Sixty	Gay Bar Bartender	
1984	Surf II	Chief Boyardie	
1989	Murder Weapon	Dr. Randolph	
1989	Danger USA	Ben	Alternate title: Mind Trap
1990	Gypsy Angels	Preacher	
1990	The Girl I Want	Coach	
1990	Dream a Little Evil	Death	Direct-to-video film
1991	Wizards of the Demon Sword	Lord Khoura	
1991	Dead Women in Lingerie	Daddy	

=== Television ===
Year	Title	Role	Notes
1966	Gunsmoke	Aikens	Episode: "Wishbone"
1967	Lost in Space	Mechanical Man	Episode: "Deadliest of the Species"
1967–1974	The Carol Burnett Show	Various Characters	Main cast (182 episodes)
1969	The Governor & J.J.	Garrett Spaulding	Episode: "Romeo and J.J."
1972	Once Upon a Mattress	Sir Studley	TV movie
1973	Marcus Welby, M.D.	Eric Lundgren	Episode: "The Day After Forever"
1973	The Barbara Eden Show	Barry Michaels	TV pilot
1973	Letters from Three Lovers	Sam	TV movie
1975	The New Original Wonder Woman	Major Steve Trevor	TV movie
1976	Maude	Jim	Episode: "The Case of the Broken Punch Bowl"
1976–1979	Wonder Woman / The New Adventures of Wonder Woman	Major Steve Trevor (1976–77); Colonel Steve Trevor Jr. (1977–79)	Main cast (59 episodes)
1977	The Love Boat II	Roger	TV movie
1977	The San Pedro Beach Bums	Jason	Episode: "Love Boat Bums: The Bums Take a Cruise"
1978	Flying High	Gavin	Episode: "Fun Flight"
1979	The Love Boat	Lance Wilson	Episode: "Second Time Around"
1979	Supertrain	Peter Sebastian	Episode: "A Very Formal Heist"
1979	Time Express	David Lane	Episode: "The Copy-Writer/The Figure Skater"
1979	The Love Boat	Jay Cavanaugh	Episode: "The Scoop"
1980	The Gossip Columnist	Terry Anderson	TV movie
1980	The Great American Traffic Jam	Wilbur Stokes	TV movie
1980	Happy Days	Bobby Burns	Episode: "Dreams Can Come True"
1980	Fantasy Island	Monty	Episode: "Gigolo"
1980	Charlie's Angels	Jack Barrows	Episode: "Island Angels"
1981	Bulba	Hampton Fraser	TV pilot
1981	Mork & Mindy	Xerko	Episode: "There's a New Mork in Town"
1981	Fantasy Island	Gilberto DeVincenzo	Episode: "The Perfect Husband"
1982	The Ugily Family	Kenny Bing	TV pilot
1982	The Love Boat	Dr. Tucker Martin	Episode: "A Dress to Remember"
1982	Romance Theatre	Jeremy	Episodes: "The Simple Truth" (Parts 1–5)
1983	Fantasy Island	Al	Episode: "No Friends Like Old Friends"
1983	Gun Shy	The Masked Stranger	Episode: "What Do You Mean 'We' Amigo?"
1984	Happy Days	Frederick Hamilton	Episode: "Like Mother, Like Daughter"
1984	Murder, She Wrote	Marty Strindberg	Episode: "Hooray for Homicide"
1985	The Great American Strip-off	Himself - Host	
1985	The Female Impersonator of the Year Pageant	Himself, co-host	TV special
1986	Hardcastle and McCormick	Dex Falcon	Episode: "If You Could See What I See"
1986	Simon & Simon	Don Manning	Episode: "The Last Big Break"
1986	The New Mike Hammer	Leo Raffle	Episode: "Requiem for Billy"
1987	It's a Living	Marlon Brando / Hector Rodriquez	Episode: "Her Back to the Future"
1990	The Golden Girls	Himself	Episode: "Mrs. George Devereaux"
1991	Murder, She Wrote	Vic DeMarco	Episode: "Where Have You Gone, Billy Boy?"
1993	Murder, She Wrote	Ben Wright	Episode: "The Big Kill"
1993	Daddy Dearest	Hank	Episode: "Thanks, But No Thanks"
1995	Burke's Law	Reece Robertson	Episode: "Who Killed Mr. Game Show?"
1995	Cybill	Himself	Episode: "The Cheese Stands Alone"
1996	Ellen	Vic	Episode: "Not So Great Expectations"
1997	Pauly	Master of Ceremonies	Episode: "Life's a Drag"
1998	Alright Already	Himself	Episode: "Again with the Satellite Dish"
1998	The Naked Truth	Himself	Episode: "Hooked on Heroine"
1999	Love Boat: The Next Wave	Tom Brooks	Episode: "Three Stages of Love"
1999	That '70s Show	Himself	Episode: "Red's Last Day"
2003	Return to the Batcave: The Misadventures of Adam and Burt	Himself - Narrator	TV movie
2003	Living Straight	Robert Cord	TV movie
2005	The War at Home	Jack	Episode: "Breaking Up Is Hard to Do", (final appearance)

== Theatre ==
Year	Title	Role	Notes
1956	Li'l Abner	Muscle Man	
1970–1971	Boeing, Boeing	Bernard	
1973	Teahouse of the August Moon	Performer	
1973	Born Yesterday	Paul Verrall	
