= Love Me Deadly =

- Theatrical release poster
- Directed by: Jacques Lacerte
- Screenplay by: Jacques Lacerte; Buck Edwards
- Story by: Roger Wall; Robert Cleere
- Produced by: H.B. Halicki; Charles W. Geiger; Buck Edwards
- Starring: Mary Charlotte Wilcox; Lyle Waggoner; Christopher Stone; Timothy Scott; Michael Pardue
- Cinematography: David Aaron
- Edited by: Leo H. Shreve
- Music by: Phil Moody
- Production companies: United Talented Productions, LTD
- Distributed by: Cinema National
- Release dates: September 13, 1972 (Atlanta, Georgia)
- Running time: 95 minutes approx.
- Country: United States
- Language: English
- Budget: $42,500

Love Me Deadly is a 1972 American horror film directed by Jacques Lacerte and starring Mary Charlotte Wilcox, Lyle Waggoner, and Christopher Stone. The screenplay concerns a coven of devil-worshipping necrophiles that moves to Los Angeles and sets up their base of operations out of a funeral home.

== Plot ==
Young, attractive Los Angeles heiress Lindsay Finch has a habit of dressing in mourning and attending wakes for men she never knew. When everyone else leaves, she kneels before the coffins and kisses the corpses passionately. However, at the many parties she holds at her house, she shows no interest in any of the (living) men. She is also fixated with her deceased father, frequently daydreaming about her childhood with him and putting her hair in pigtails to visit his grave.

Her friend Wade Farrow is romantically interested in her, but she rejects his affections. Meanwhile, mortician Fred McSweeney notices Lindsay's attendance at the wakes and, although she won't admit to her secret passion, he recognizes her as a kindred spirit. Fred has a Satanic coven that meets after hours in the mortuary for necrophilic orgies with the latest cadavers. At one point, Fred picks up a gay male hustler under the guise of wanting to engage in sex. Fred brings him to the mortuary where he straps him down and embalms him alive by pumping him full of formaldehyde. Fred eventually coaxes Lindsay to join his group. When Wade follows her to the funeral home, he stumbles across one of the group preparing a body for the coming orgy, and is killed before being sexually ravaged by the cult.

At one of the wakes, Lindsay meets and finds herself drawn to the deceased's brother, art gallery owner Alex Martin. An intense romance begins, Lindsay's first real relationship. The two get married, but Lindsay can't bring herself to consummate the marriage, and Alex is confused and frustrated by his new wife's inability to return his affections. Alex sees Lindsay entering Fred's mortuary one afternoon and grows suspicious of her day-to-day activities. During a conversation with Miss Pritchard, the maid at Lindsay's home, Alex learns that Lindsay developed an unhealthy obsession with her dead father at a young age, and that Lindsay would have her drive her to his grave every day.

Alex drives to the cemetery, and finds Lindsay in a childlike state, frolicking around her father's grave. His appearance there startles her, and Lindsay flees in her car. The following day, Alex attempts to confront her again over the incident, and they briefly become copacetic. They plan to go into the country to visit Alex's family for dinner, but Lindsay claims to feel ill, and encourages Alex to go alone. Before leaving, Alex opens a registered letter addressed to Lindsay from Fred's funeral parlor, notifying of a meeting that night.

Alex attends the family dinner without Lindsay, but leaves early and drives to Fred's funeral parlor. He enters the building and stumbles upon Lindsay and the rest of the cult about to engage in sex with a male corpse. Upon seeing Alex, Fred stabs him to death. Lindsay is brought home by Fred, who gives her a sedative before telling her that he has "prepared" Alex, and that he is in the bedroom waiting for her. While Lindsay lies there, she remembers her inadvertent shooting of her father during her childhood, which resulted in his death. Lindsay stumbles into Alex's bedroom, where she finds Fred fondling Alex's corpse. Lindsay proceeds to clobber Fred to death with a statue before lying beside Alex.

== Cast ==
- Mary Charlotte Wilcox as Lindsay Finch
  - Terri Anne Duvalis as Lindsay Finch As A Child
- Christopher Stone as Wade Farrow
- Timothy Scott as Fred McSweeney
- Lyle Waggoner as Alex Martin
- Dassa Cates as Miss Pritchard
- Michael Pardue as Lindsay's Father
- H. B. Halicki as Race Driver

== Production ==
Love Me Deadly was shot in Los Angeles, California and the surrounding area. The cemetery sequences were shot on location at Rose Hills Memorial Park in Whittier, California. The film's director, Jacques Lacerte, was an inexperienced filmmaker and had previously worked as a high school theater teacher.

The film's producer, Buck Edwards, stated in a 2008 audio commentary for the film that significant dubbing as well as extended musical scores were implemented over montages to hide what he felt was poorly written dialogue.

== Release ==
The film was released on 13 September 1972 in several Atlanta, Georgia drive-in theaters, paired as a triple-feature with Blood Fiend and The Blood Demon.

== See also ==
- List of American films of 1972

== Sources ==
- Edwards, Buck; Goodsell, Greg (2018) [2008]. Love Me Deadly (Blu-ray audio commentary). Code Red.
