= The Redeemer (film) =

1978 American horror film directed by Constantine S. Gochis

The Redeemer: Son of Satan
- Theatrical release poster
- Directed by: Constantine S. Gochis
- Written by: William Vernick
- Produced by: Sheldon Tromberg
- Starring: Jeanetta Arnette; T.G. Finkbinder
- Cinematography: John Michael Beymer
- Edited by: Jack Foster
- Music by: Phil Gallo; Clem Vicari Jr.
- Production company: MLTD Productions
- Distributed by: Dimension Pictures
- Release date: March 17, 1978
- Running time: 84 minutes
- Country: United States
- Language: English

The Redeemer (Note: The film is also known by the alternative titles The Redeemer... Son of Satan! and Class Reunion Massacre.) is a 1978 American supernatural slasher film directed by Constantine S. Gochis. It follows a group of people trapped inside their high school during a ten-year reunion who are being killed off by a mysterious killer known as The Redeemer.

== Plot ==
Christopher, a young boy, emerges from a rural lake fully clothed, walks to a road, where a shuttle bus picks up and takes him with other boys who are part of a church choir. During the church service, a preacher arrives and gives a hate-filled sermon about the sins of the world and of six people who lived their life of sin, each of them 1967 graduates of the now-shuttered Stuart Morse Academy.

The six individuals receive invitations to 10-year high school reunion: John Sinclair, a corrupt lawyer; Cindy, a party girl; Terry, a gluttonous slacker; Jane, a wealthy and shallow heiress; Roger, a vain film actor; and Kirsten, a closeted, self-loathing lesbian.

At the school, a man arrives claiming to be a property inspector and is let inside by the janitor. The man then shoots the janitor dead in the swimming pool area and, after hiding the body, makes a plaster mold of its face. From that mold, he makes a latex mask.

John, Cindy, Terry, Jane, Roger and Kirsten arrive at the school where the man, disguised as the janitor, lets them in. Inside, they find a decorated ballroom complete with food and drinks, but no one else present. As everyone settle down to eat, they discuss why they received the same invite despite that most of them barely knew each other in school. While exploring the building, they find the body of the janitor and when they try to leave, the find themselves locked in the building with the killer who proceeds to stalk and kill them one by one.

Terry is set on fire and burns to death by a blowtorch set up to a tripwire in an office. Jane manages to get out of the building and encounters a hunter outside who promises to help. He is actually the killer in disguise, kills her with his shotgun and returns her body to the school. While searching for a way out, the four remaining people encounter the killer, now disguised as a magician, wearing a suit and a cape, in an auditorium. He kills Roger by another contraption involving a suspended dagger to fall on his head. While trying to find a way out in the locker room, Cindy is attacked by the killer, now wearing a clown mask. He drowns her in a sink filled with water.

In the school office, John encounters the killer, now dressed in a business suit with a fake mustache. He has lured the group to the school to kill them for their life of sin and knows all about John's crimes. The killer claims to be a "redeemer" who was chosen to rid the world of the wicked by being to kill a select few. When John and the Redeemer struggle over a gun, the latter gets shot in his side. However, he manages to shoot John dead. The wounded killer then chases Kirsten back to the auditorium, where she knocks the gun away from the Redeemer, and attempts to shoot him again. However, the Redeemer takes command of a clown dummy who raises a knife to bring it down on Kirsten, killing her.

The Redeemer, revealed to be the priest, returns to his church and concludes his sermon. He claims that "those who have sinned" have been given "redemption" for their own afterlife. After the service ends, the Redeemer meets with Christopher. The boy killed a bully who earlier threatened him and placed the dead body in the car of a con artist Bible salesman who visited the church. Christopher says that everything will be all right now, and that he is pleased with the Redeemer's work. The Redeemer then returns to his apartment where he tends to his bullet wound. He has two thumbs on his left hand, one of which then fades away along with his gunshot wound. The Redeemer says that God is pleased with what he has done and he will be waiting for any future work. Meanwhile, Christopher takes the church shuttle bus back to the lake, into which he walks fully clothed to return from where he came.

== Cast ==
- Jeannetta Arnette as Cindy
- T.G. Finkbinder as The Redeemer
- Damien Knight as John
- Nick Carter as Terry
- Nikki Barthen as Jane
- Michael Hollingsworth as Roger
- Gyr Patterson as Kirsten
- Christopher Flint as Christopher

== Production ==
The film was completed over a period of three months between April 11, 1977, and July 21, 1977. Re-shoots were done in January 1978. It was filmed almost entirely at the former Staunton Military Academy in Staunton, Virginia which was closed in 1976 and is now the Mary Baldwin University.

== Release ==
The Redeemer was released on March 17, 1978 in Florida, North Carolina, and South Carolina. It later opened in Staunton, Virginia on June 21, 1978. It subsequently opened theatrically in Los Angeles on October 25, 1978. The film has two alternate titles: The Redeemer... Son of Satan! and Class Reunion Massacre.

=== Home media ===
The Redeemer was released on VHS by Continental Video in 1985 under the title Class Reunion Massacre. It was later released on VHS by Victory Multimedia on September 13, 1995. The film was released on DVD by Code Red on October 19, 2010. It was later released by Desert Island Films, under the alternate title Class Reunion Massacre on August 1, 2012.

== Reception ==
=== Critical response ===
In a review published in the Los Angeles Times, it was noted: "In a year of trashy C-minus movies, The Redeemer (citywide) takes the prize as the worst. It's a badly acted, stiffly photographed, vile film that mixes together And Then There Were None, Whatever Happened to the Class of '65? and The Omen, then tosses in the Seven Deadly Sins as an afterthought. The film is directed with theatrical hysteria, too many arbitrary long shots and repulsive violence by Constantine S. Gochis." Fred Pfisterer of The News Leader wrote: "The plot contains some grisly and colorful murders–eight or nine, it's hard to keep score–is confusing ... The camera work is good; the acting by mainly Washington-area residents, passable."

Of retrospective reviews, the UK horror film review website Hysteria Lives! gave the film 1 of 5 stars, criticizing the film for what they called "its warped morality". They concluded the review by writing, "There are some really nice touches here: good cinematography; a genuinely creepy ambience and a likeable principle cast [sic]. It's just a shame they ended up in mean-spirited junk like this." The Terror Trap awarded the film 2.5 out of 4 stars, calling it "surprisingly well-crafted".

Todd Martin from HorrorNews.net gave the film a positive review, calling it "an underrated classic". AllMovie called it a "genuinely disturbing proto-slasher" that is "guilty of the same gaping plot holes and cardboard characterizations as any other, but a good cast, creepy ambiance and swift pace make it an obscure gem." Joseph A. Ziemba from Bleeding Skull! called it "creepy, unsettling, and places all bets on the mysterious side of things". Ziemba also praised the film's cinematography, killer, mystery factor, and uncomfortable tone. Wes R. from Oh, the Horror! wrote "The Redeemer: Son of Satan! is a truly great, forgotten horror movie. Yes, it's got it's [sic] cheesy problems just like any other film of its era, but it also builds a sense of foreboding doom more palpable than a lot of movies I have encountered." Ian Jane from DVD Talk gave the film a positive review, concluding, "Ultimately, despite the fact that it's basically a stalk and slash, The Redeemer has enough going for it in terms of creativity and unpredictability that horror fans should find a lot to like about the movie. It's not a perfect film and there are moments that work better than others, but overall there's plenty of entertainment value here and even a couple of creepy thrills."
