= Trapped (1982 film) =

- Directed by: William Fruet
- Written by: John Beaird
- Produced by: Herb Abramson
- Starring: Henry Silva
- Cinematography: Mark Irwin
- Music by: Eric N. Robertson
- Distributed by: Jensen Farley Productions
- Release date: May 28, 1982
- Language: English

Trapped (also known as Baker County, U.S.A. and The Killer Instinct) is a 1982 Canadian-American thriller-horror film directed by William Fruet and starring Henry Silva.

== Premise ==
A group of college students witness a redneck murdering his wife's lover. They then become his target.

== Cast ==
- Henry Silva as Henry Chatwill
- Nicholas Campbell as Roger Michaels
- Barbara Gordon as Miriam Chatwill
- Gina Dick as Diana
- Joy Thompson as Caroline
- Danone Camden as Amy
- Ralph Benmergui as Lee
- Allan Royal as Leonard
- Sam Malkin as Jeb
- Stuart Culpepper as Myles

== Production ==
The film was shot in the state of Georgia and the province of Ontario.

== Reception ==
Mondo Digital says the film was "Made at the height of Canadian tax-shelter film-making, which generated such filmmakers as David Cronenberg, Trapped is another of the country’s Deliverance-inspired revenge films after the excellent Rituals..."
