= Slasher film =

Horror film subgenre

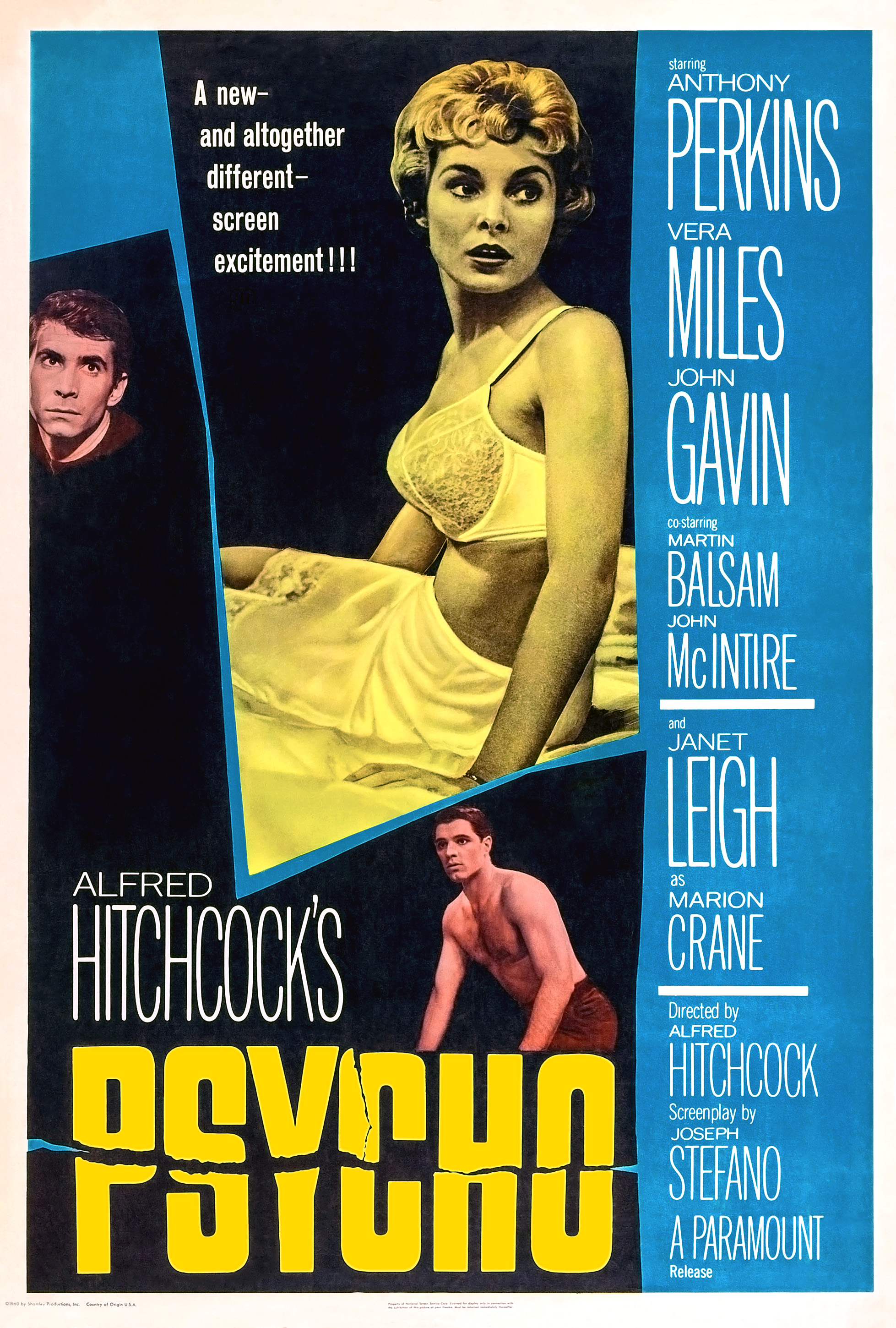
Alfred Hitchcock's Psycho (1960) was a huge success on release, and a critical influence on the slasher genre.

A slasher film is a subgenre of horror films involving a killer or a group of killers stalking and murdering a group of people, often by use of bladed or sharp tools. Although the term "slasher" may occasionally be used informally as a generic term for any horror film involving murder, film analysts cite an established set of characteristics which set slasher films apart from other horror subgenres, such as monster movies, splatter films, supernatural and psychological horror films.

Critics cite psychological horror films such as Peeping Tom (1960) and Psycho (1960) and the Italian giallo films as early influences. The genre hit its peak between 1978 and 1984 in an era referred to as the "Golden Age" of slasher films. Notable slasher films include Black Christmas (1974), The Texas Chain Saw Massacre (1974), Halloween (1978), Friday the 13th (1980), My Bloody Valentine (1981), Sleepaway Camp (1983), A Nightmare on Elm Street (1984), Child's Play (1988), Scream (1996), I Know What You Did Last Summer (1997), and Urban Legend (1998). Many slasher films released decades ago continue to attract cult followings. The slasher canon can be divided into three eras: the classical (1974–1993), the self-referential (1994–2000) and the neoslasher cycle (2000–2013).

== Definition ==
Slasher films typically adhere to a specific formula: a past wrongful action causes severe trauma that is reinforced by a commemoration or anniversary that reactivates or re-inspires the killer. Built around stalk-and-murder sequences, the films draw upon the audience's feelings of catharsis, recreation, and displacement, as related to sexual pleasure. Paste magazine's definition notes that, "slasher villains are human beings, or were human beings at some point ... Slasher villains are human killers whose actions are objectively evil, because they’re meant to be bound by human morality. That’s part of the fear that the genre is meant to prey upon, the idea that killers walk among us." Films with similar structures that have non-human antagonists lacking a conscience, such as Alien or The Terminator, are not traditionally considered slasher films (though many slasher antagonists are superhuman, have supernatural traits, or possess slightly warped or abstract anthropomorphic forms both physically and metaphysically).

=== Common tropes ===
The final girl trope is discussed in film studies as being a young woman (occasionally a young man) left alone to face the killer's advances in the movie's end. Laurie Strode (Jamie Lee Curtis), the heroine in Halloween, is an example of a typical final girl. Final girls are often, like Laurie Strode, virgins among sexually active teens. Others have called the trope "self-mythologising" based on a handful of especially high-profile examples, asserting that its prominence has been overstated – particularly the innocent, virginal qualities ascribed to putative final girls – and that, in the 21st century, the trope has been filtered through the lens of parody, subversion, and self-aware humour rather than deployed sincerely.

When slasher films become franchises, they typically take on villain protagonist characteristics, with the series following the continued efforts of their antagonists, rather than any of the killer's disposable victims, including any individual entry's heroes or final survivor(s) (who, in so far as they continue to appear within the series, are often killed off immediately after their next on-screen appearance, which has become its own trope). Examples of antiheroes around whom the respective series have become centered include Michael Myers, Freddy Krueger, Jason Voorhees, Chucky and Leatherface. The antagonist is envisioned and embedded into the public psyche as the main and most marketable/recognisable character, even if his screentime is dwarfed in any specific film by the nominal protagonists. The Scream film series is a rarity that follows its heroine Sidney Prescott (Neve Campbell) rather than masked killer Ghostface, whose identity changes from film to film, and is only revealed in each entry's finale.

Another alleged trope frequently associated with slasher discourse – and horror more broadly – is that of the "black character(s) dying first" (often formulated as "always dying first"). Actual analyses of the films, such as a 2013 investigative piece in Complex, have found that the trope is largely self-mythologising as opposed to being a statistical reality (per Complex, in only 10% of the fifty analysed movies, all containing one or more speaking black characters, did any of them die first).

== Origins ==
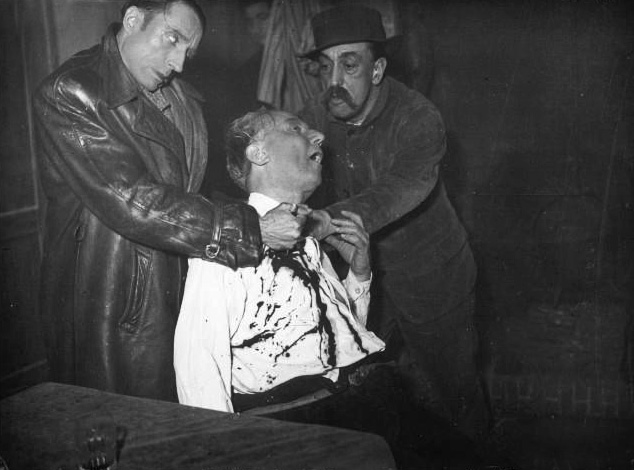
A scene from the Grand Guignol, a format some critics have cited as an influence on the slasher film

The appeal of watching people inflict violence upon each other dates back thousands of years to Ancient Rome. The seventeenth century fairy tale, Bluebeard, "can be seen as one of the slasher film’s progenitors." So too can the late 19th century horror plays produced at the Grand Guignol; Maurice Tourneur's The Lunatics (1912) used visceral violence to attract the Guignol's audience. In the United States, public outcry over films like this eventually led to the passage of the Hays Code in 1930. The Hays Code is one of the entertainment industry's earliest set of guidelines restricting sexuality and violence deemed unacceptable.

Crime writer Mary Roberts Rinehart influenced horror literature with her novel The Circular Staircase (1908), adapted into the silent film The Bat (1926), about guests in a remote mansion menaced by a killer in a grotesque mask. Its success led to a series of "old dark house" films including The Cat and the Canary (1927), based on John Willard's 1922 stage play, and Universal Pictures' The Old Dark House (1932), based on the novel by J.B. Priestley. In both films, the town dwellers are pitted against strange country folk, a recurring theme in later horror films. Along with the "madman on the loose" plotline, these films employed several influences upon the slasher genre, such as lengthy point of view shots and a "sins of the father" catalyst to propel the plot's mayhem.

=== Early film influences ===
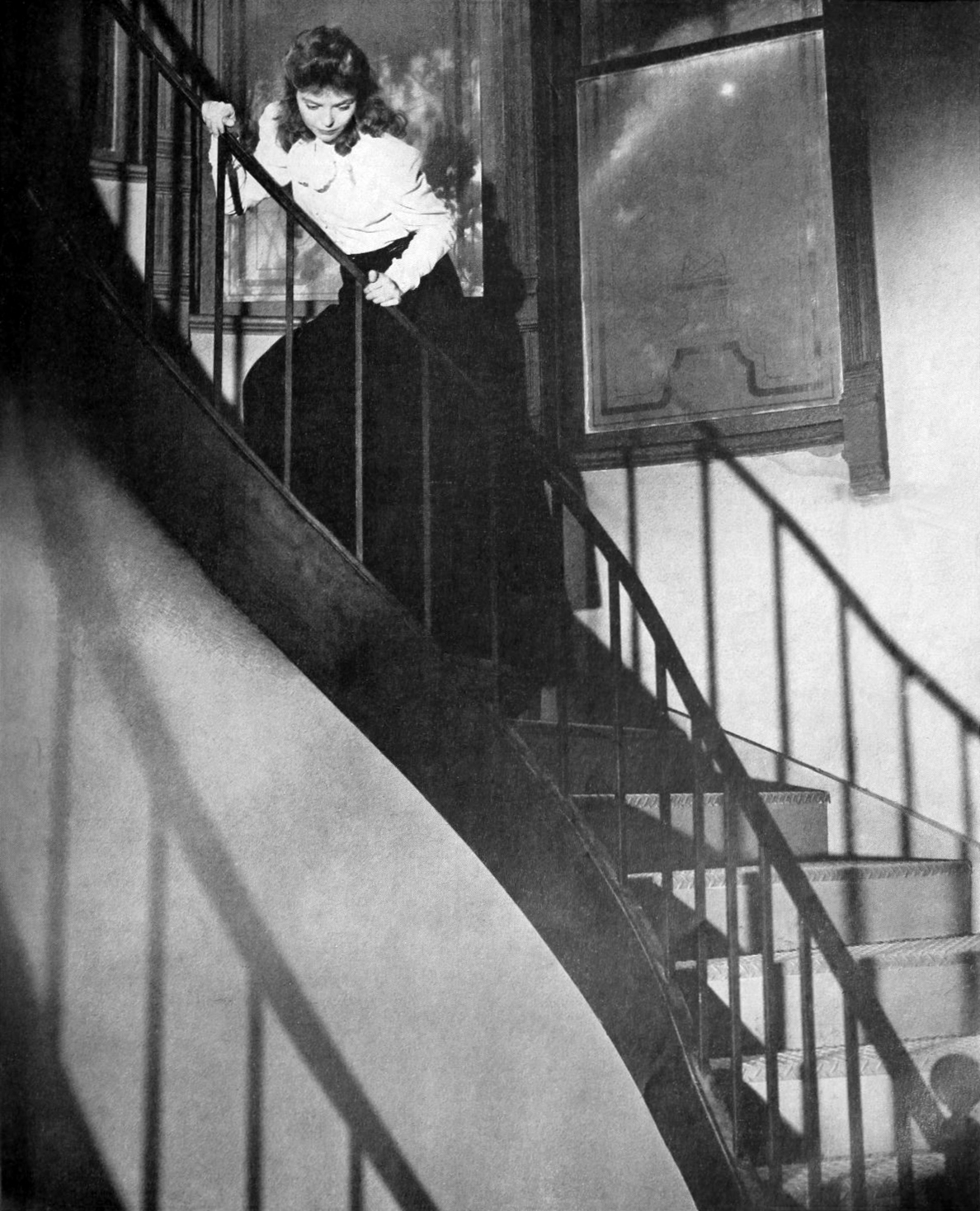
Dorothy McGuire in The Spiral Staircase (1946)

George Archainbaud's Thirteen Women (1932) tells the story of a sorority whose former members are set against one another by a vengeful peer who crosses out their yearbook photos, a device used in subsequent films Prom Night (1980) and Graduation Day (1981). Early examples include a maniac seeking revenge in The Terror (1928), based on the play by Edgar Wallace.

B-movie mogul Val Lewton produced The Leopard Man (1943), about a murderer framing his crimes against women on an escaped show leopard. Basil Rathbone's The Scarlet Claw (1944) sees Sherlock Holmes investigate murders committed with a five-pronged garden weeder that the killer would raise in the air and bring down on the victim repeatedly, an editing technique that became familiar in the genre. Robert Siodmak's The Spiral Staircase (1946), based on Ethel White's novel Some Must Watch, stars Ethel Barrymore as a sympathetic woman trying to survive black-gloved killers. The Spiral Staircase also features an early use of jump scares.

British writer Agatha Christie's particularly influential 1939 novel Ten Little Indians (adapted in 1945 as And Then There Were None), centers on a group of people with secret pasts who are killed one-by-one on an isolated island. Each of the murders mirrors a verse from a nursery rhyme, merging the themes of childhood innocence and vengeful murder. House of Wax (1953), The Bad Seed (1956), Screaming Mimi (1958), Jack the Ripper (1959), and Cover Girl Killer (1959) all incorporated Christie's literary themes.

=== 1960s horror-thrillers ===
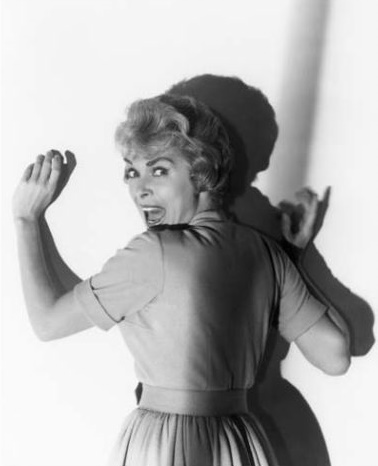
Janet Leigh in a promotional still for Psycho

Alfred Hitchcock's Psycho (1960) used visuals that had been deemed unacceptable by movie studios, including scenes of violence, sexuality, and the shot of a toilet flushing. The film featured an iconic score by Bernard Herrmann that has been frequently imitated in slasher and horror films. That same year, Michael Powell released Peeping Tom, showing the killer's perspective as he murders women to photograph their dying expressions.

Psycho was nominated for four Academy Awards, including Best Supporting Actress for Janet Leigh and Anthony Perkins garnering universal acclaim for his role as Norman Bates. This notice drew bankable movie stars to horror films. Joan Crawford starred in William Castle's Strait-Jacket (1964) and in Jim O'Connolly's Berserk! (1967), while Albert Finney starred in MGM's Night Must Fall (1964) (a remake of the 1937 British film) and Peter Cushing starred in Corruption (1968).

Hammer Studios, a London-based company, followed Psycho's success with Taste of Fear (1961), Maniac (1963), Paranoiac (1963), Nightmare (1964), Fanatic (1965), The Nanny (1965), and Hysteria (1965). Hammer's rival Amicus had Robert Bloch, author of 1959 Psycho novel, write the script for Psychopath (1968).

Francis Ford Coppola's debut, Dementia 13 (1963), takes place in an Irish castle where relatives gather to commemorate a family death but are murdered one by one. William Castle's Homicidal (1961) features gore in its murder scenes, something both Psycho and Peeping Tom had edited out. Richard Hillard's Violent Midnight (1963) showed a black-gloved killer's point of view as they pull down a branch to watch a victim and also featured a skinny-dipping scene. Crown International's Terrified (1963) features a masked killer. Spain's The House That Screamed (1969) features violent murders and preempted later campus-based slashers.

=== Splatter, Krimi and giallo films ===
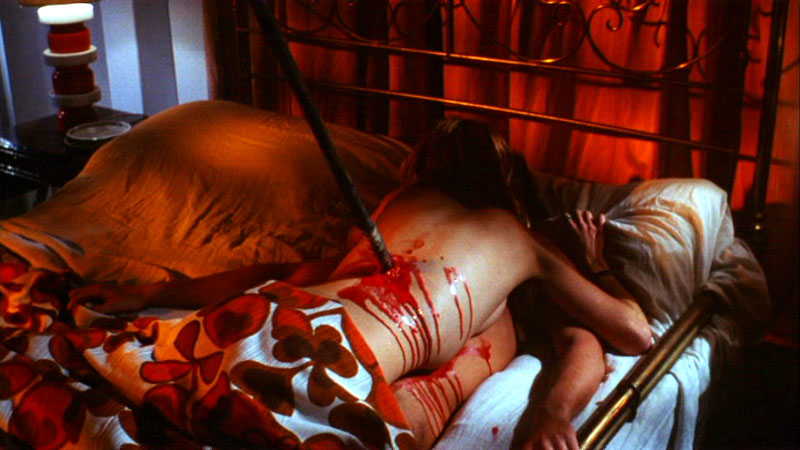
A scene from Mario Bava's A Bay of Blood (1971), which was notably imitated in Friday the 13th Part 2 (1981)

Subgenres that influenced slasher films include splatter films, Krimi films, and giallo films.

Splatter films focus on gratuitous gore. Herschell Gordon Lewis's Blood Feast (1963) was a hit at drive-in theaters and is often considered the first splatter film. Lewis followed with gory films Two-Thousand Maniacs! (1964), Color Me Blood Red (1965), The Gruesome Twosome (1967) and The Wizard of Gore (1970). This grotesque style translated to Andy Milligan's The Ghastly Ones (1969), Twisted Nerve (1968), Night After Night After Night (1969) as well as The Haunted House of Horror (1969).

Post-World War II Germany adapted British writer Edgar Wallace's crime novels into a subgenre of their own called Krimi films. The Krimi films were released in the late 1950s through the early 1970s and featured villains in bold costumes accompanied by jazz scores from composers such as Martin Böttcher and Peter Thomas. Fellowship of the Frog (1959), about a murderer terrorizing London, was successful in America, leading to similar adaptations like The Green Archer (1961) and Dead Eyes of London (1961). The Rialto Studio produced 32 Krimi films between 1959 and 1970.

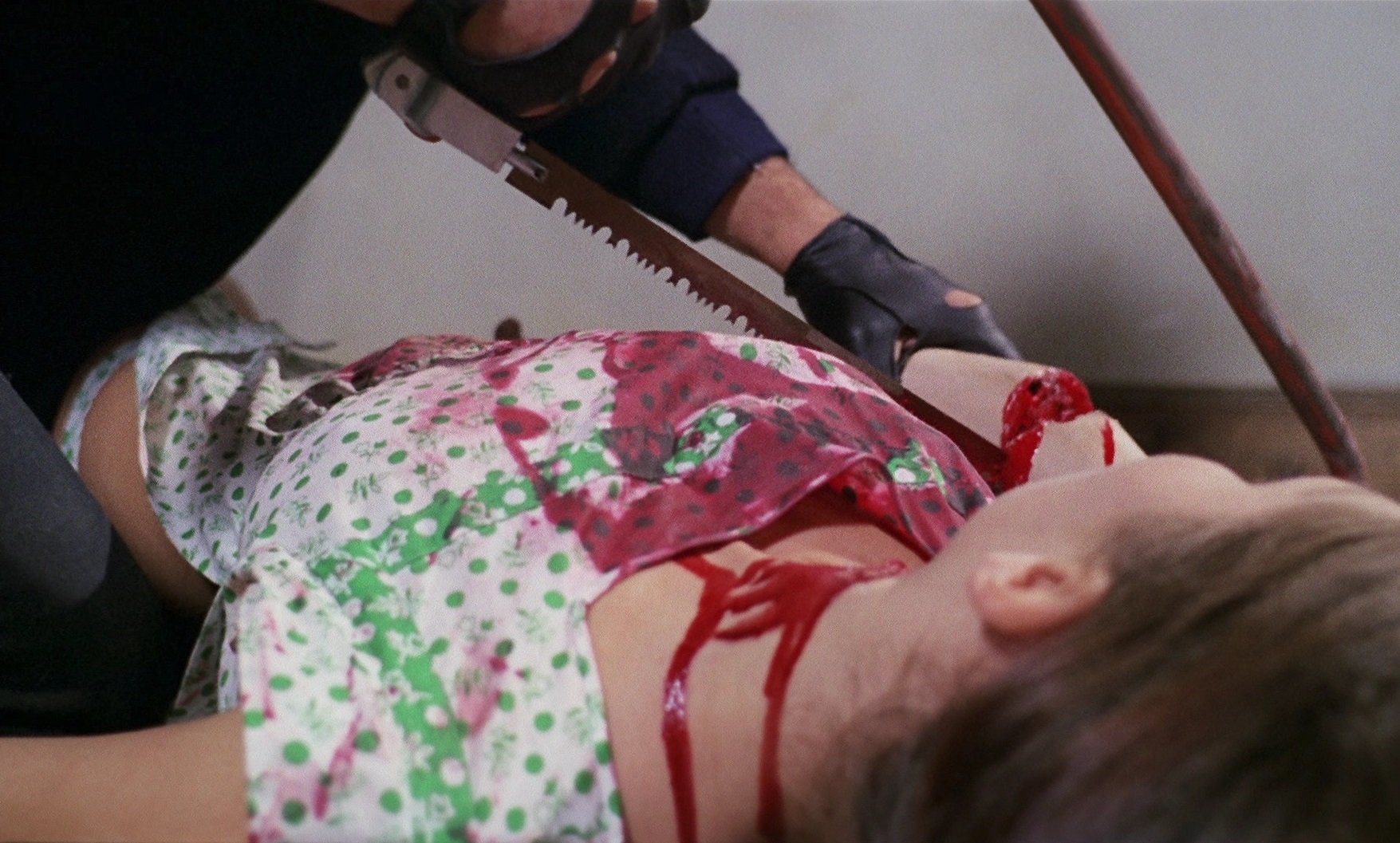
A scene from Sergio Martino's film, Torso (1973)

Italy's giallo thrillers are crime procedurals or murder mysteries interlaced with eroticism and psychological horror. Giallo films feature unidentified killers murdering in grand fashions. Unlike most American slasher films the protagonists of gialli are frequently (but not always) jet-setting adults sporting the most stylish Milan fashions. These protagonists are often outsiders reluctantly brought into the mystery through extenuating circumstances, like witnessing a murder or being suspected of the crimes themselves. Much like Krimi films, gialli plots tended to be outlandish and improbable, occasionally employing supernatural elements. Mario Bava's A Bay of Blood (1971) is a whodunit featuring a subplot depicting creative death sequences on a secluded lakeside setting, which greatly inspired Friday the 13th (1980), its 1981 sequel and subsequent slashers. Sergio Martino's Torso (1973) featured a masked killer preying upon beautiful and promiscuous young women in retribution for a past misdeed. Torso's edge-of-your-seat climax finds a sensible "final girl" facing off with the killer in an isolated villa. Umberto Lenzi's Eyeball (1975), which unfolds in an Agatha Christie manner, is noted by some as a slasher precursor, as American tourists are targeted by a killer wearing a red raincoat.

The influence of Hitchcock's Psycho extended also to gialli, with films such as The Strange Vice of Mrs. Wardh (1971), The Case of the Scorpion's Tail (1971) and The Crimes of the Black Cat (1972) paying homage to Hitchcock's film. Gialli were popular in American cinemas and drive-in theaters. Thriller Assault (1971) and Spanish mystery A Dragonfly for Each Corpse (1974) share many traits with Italian gialli. Death Steps in the Dark (1977) spoofed the familiar conventions found in giallo films. Despite successes from Deep Red (1975) and The Blood-Stained Shadow (1978), giallo films gradually fell out of fashion by the mid-1970s as diminishing returns forced budget cuts. Films such as Play Motel (1979) and Giallo a Venezia (1979) exploited their low-budgets with shocking hardcore pornography.

=== Exploitation films ===
The early 1970s saw an increase in exploitation films that lured audiences to grindhouses and drive-ins by advertising of sex and violence. Robert Fuest's And Soon the Darkness (1970) set off the 1970s exploitation wave by maximizing its small budget and taking place in daylight. The Jekyll and Hyde Portfolio (1971) follows an insane killer who stalks and murders victims at a nursing academy. Hands of the Ripper (1971) depicts the psychological trauma suffered by Jack the Ripper's daughter, who continues the murderous reign of her father. Fright (1971) is based on the "babysitter and the man upstairs" urban legend while Tower of Evil (1972) features careless partying teens murdered in a remote island lighthouse. Pete Walker broke taboos by advertising his films' negative reviews to attract viewers looking for the depraved, using a "no press is bad press" mantra with The Flesh and Blood Show (1972), Frightmare (1974), House of Mortal Sin (1976), Schizo (1976) and The Comeback (1978). Other filmmakers followed Walker's lead, as posters dubbed Blood and Lace (1971) as "sickest PG-rated movie ever made!", while Scream Bloody Murder (1973) called itself "gore-nography."

By 1974 the exploitation film battled changing audience tastes and their popularity waned, and while films like The Love Butcher (1975) and The Redeemer: Son of Satan (1976) were accused of promoting bigotry, the low-budget independent film The Texas Chain Saw Massacre (1974) became a major hit and the most commercially successful horror film since The Exorcist. The story concerns a violent clash of cultures and ideals between the counter-culture and traditional conservative values, with the film's squealing antagonist Leatherface carrying a chainsaw and wearing the faces of victims he and his family eat. The Texas Chain Saw Massacre spawned imitators and its false "based on a true story" advertisements gave way to reenactments of true crime. The Town That Dreaded Sundown (1976), based on the Phantom Killer case, and Another Son of Sam (1977), based on the Son of Sam slayings, cashed-in on headlines and public fascination. Wes Craven modernized the Sawney Bean legend in The Hills Have Eyes (1977) by building upon themes presented in The Texas Chain Saw Massacre. The Hills Have Eyes was another huge financial success, relaunching Craven's career after it had been damaged by controversy surrounding his previous film, The Last House on the Left (1972).

Silent Night, Bloody Night (full film)

Following holiday-themed exploitation films Home for the Holidays (1972), All Through the House (1972) and Silent Night, Bloody Night (1973), Christmas horror film Black Christmas (1974) uses horror as a board to debate social topics of its time, including feminism, abortion, and alcoholism. Using the "killer calling from inside the house" gimmick, Black Christmas is visually and thematically a precursor to John Carpenter's Halloween (1978), as young women are terrorized in a previously safe environment during an iconic holiday. Like Halloween, Clark's film opens with a lengthy point-of-view, but it differs in the treatment of the killer's identity. Despite making $4,053,000 on a $620,000 budget, Black Christmas was initially criticized, with Variety complaining that it was a "bloody, senseless kill-for-kicks" flick that exploited unnecessary violence. Despite its modest initial box office run, the film has garnered critical reappraisal, with film historians noting its importance in the horror film genre and some even citing it as the original slasher film.

== 1978–1984: Golden Age ==
Jumpstarted by the massive success of John Carpenter's Halloween (1978), the era commonly cited as the Golden Age of slasher films is 1978–1984, with some scholars citing over 100 similar films released over the six-year period. Despite most films receiving negative reviews, many Golden Age slasher films were extremely profitable and have established cult followings. Many films reused Halloween's template of a murderous figure stalking teens, though they escalated the gore and nudity from Carpenter's restrained film. Golden Age slasher films exploited dangers lurking in American institutions such as high schools, colleges, summer camps, and hospitals.

=== 1978 ===
Cashing in on the drive-in success of The Texas Chain Saw Massacre (1974), The Toolbox Murders was quickly and cheaply shot but did not generate the interest of the former films. Exploitative Killer's Delight is a San Francisco-set serial killer story claiming to take inspiration from Ted Bundy and the Zodiac Killer. Leading up to Halloween's October release were August's gialli-inspired Eyes of Laura Mars (written by John Carpenter) and September's "babysitter in peril" TV Movie Are You in the House Alone? Of them, The Eyes of Laura Mars grossed $20 million against a $7 million budget.

Influenced by the French New Wave's Eyes Without a Face (1960), science fiction thriller Westworld (1973) and Black Christmas (1974), Halloween was directed, composed and co-written by Carpenter, and produced and co-written by Debra Hill on a budget of $300,000 provided by Syrian-American producer Moustapha Akkad. To minimize costs, locations were reduced and time took place over a brief period. Jamie Lee Curtis, daughter of Janet Leigh, was cast as the heroine Laurie Strode while veteran actor Donald Pleasence was cast as Dr. Sam Loomis, an homage to John Gavin's character in Psycho. Halloween's opening tracks a six-year-old's point-of-view as he kills his older sister, a scene emulated in numerous films such as Blow Out (1981) and The Funhouse (1981). Carpenter and Hill deny writing sexually active teens to be victims in favor of a virginal "final girl" survivor, though subsequent filmmakers copied what appeared to be a "sex-equals-death" mantra.

When shown an early cut of Halloween without a musical score, all major American studios declined to distribute it, one executive even remarking that it was not scary. Carpenter added music himself, and the film was distributed locally in four Kansas City theaters through Akkad's Compass International Pictures in October 1978. Word-of-mouth made the movie a sleeper hit that was selected to screen at the November 1978 Chicago Film Festival, where the country's major critics acclaimed it. Halloween grew into a major box office success, grossing over $70 million worldwide and selling over 20 million tickets in North America, becoming the most profitable independent film until being surpassed by Teenage Mutant Ninja Turtles (1990).

=== 1979 ===
Though the telekinesis-themed slasher Tourist Trap was initially unsuccessful, it has undergone a reappraisal by fans. 1979's most successful slasher was Fred Walton's When a Stranger Calls, which sold 8.5 million tickets in North America. Its success has largely been credited to its opening scene, in which a babysitter (Carol Kane) is taunted by a caller who repeatedly asks, "Have you checked the children?" Less successful were Ray Dennis Steckler's burlesque slasher The Hollywood Strangler Meets the Skid Row Slasher and Abel Ferrara's The Driller Killer, both of which featured gratuitous on-screen violence against vagrant people.

=== 1980 ===
The election of Ronald Reagan as the 40th president of the United States drew in a new age of conservatism that ushered concern of rising violence on film. The slasher film, at the height of its commercial power, also became the center of a political and cultural maelstrom. Sean S. Cunningham's sleeper hit Friday the 13th was the year's most commercially successful slasher film, grossing more than $59.7 million and selling nearly 15 million tickets in North America. Despite a financial success, distributor Paramount Pictures was criticized for "lowering" itself to release a violent exploitation film, with Gene Siskel and Roger Ebert famously despising the film. Siskel, in his Chicago Tribune review, revealed the identity and fate of the film's killer in an attempt to hurt its box office, and provided the address of the chairman of Paramount Pictures for viewers to complain. The MPAA was criticized for allowing Friday the 13th an R rating, but its violence would inspire gorier films to follow, as it set a new bar for acceptable levels of on-screen violence. The criticisms that began with Friday the 13th would lead to the genre's eventual decline in subsequent years.

The small-budget thrillers Silent Scream and Prom Night were box office hits with 3.2 and 5.5 million admissions, respectively. Jamie Lee Curtis starred in the independent Prom Night, as well studio films Terror Train and The Fog to earn her "scream queen" title. MGM's the Halloween-clone He Knows You're Alone sold nearly 2 million tickets, though Paramount Pictures John Huston-directed Phobia only sold an estimated 22,000 tickets. Two high-profile slasher-thrillers were met with protest, William Friedkin's Cruising and Gordon Willis' Windows, both of which equate homosexuality with psychosis. Cruising drew protests from gay rights groups, and though it pre-dates the AIDS crisis, the film's portrayal of the gay community fueled subsequent backlash once the virus became an epidemic.

Low budget exploitative films New Year's Evil, Don't Go in the House and Don't Answer the Phone! were called-out for misogyny that dwelled on the suffering of females exclusively. Acclaimed filmmaker Brian De Palma's Psycho-homage Dressed to Kill drew a wave of protest from the National Organization for Women (NOW), who picketed the film's screening on the University of Iowa campus. The year's most controversial slasher was William Lustig's Maniac, about a schizophrenic serial killer in New York. Maniac was maligned by critics. Vincent Canby of The New York Times said that watching the film was like "watching someone else throw up." Lustig released the film unrated on American screens, sidestepping the MPAA to still sell 2.2 million tickets at the box office.

Alfred Hitchcock's Psycho's influence was felt two decades later in Cries in the Night and The Unseen. Joe D'Amato's gruesome Italian horror film Antropophagus and the Australian slasher Nightmares showed that the genre was spreading internationally.

=== 1981 ===
Slasher films reached a saturation point in 1981, as heavily promoted movies like My Bloody Valentine and The Burning were box office failures. After the success of Friday the 13th, Paramount Pictures picked up My Bloody Valentine with hopes to achieve similar success. The film became the subject of intense scrutiny in the wake of John Lennon's murder, and was released heavily edited; lacking the draw of gore, My Bloody Valentine barely sold 2 million tickets in North America, much less than the 15 million sold by Friday the 13th the year beforehand. Thematically similar to My Bloody Valentine, The Prowler hoped to lure an audience with gore effects by Friday the 13th's Tom Savini but large MPAA edits contributed to its failure to find a nationwide distributor. Suffering similar censorship was The Burning, which also employed Savini's special effects, though it does mark the feature film debuts of Brad Grey, Holly Hunter, Jason Alexander, Fisher Stevens, Bob Weinstein and Harvey Weinstein.

Profits of Halloween and Friday the 13th drew studio interest, to varying success. Warner Bros.'s Eyes of a Stranger (402,386 admissions) and Night School (420,818 admission),Paramount Pictures' The Fan (1.1 million admissions), Universal Pictures The Funhouse (2.8 million admissions), and Columbia Pictures Happy Birthday to Me (3.8 million admissions). CBS' TV movie, Dark Night of the Scarecrow brought the genre to the small screen. Two sequels had bigger body counts and more gore than their predecessors, but not higher box office intakes. Friday the 13th Part 2 sold 7.8 million tickets and Halloween II sold 9.2 million. Both sequels sold under half of their original film's tickets, though they were still very popular (Halloween II was the second highest-grossing horror film of the year behind An American Werewolf in London).

Independent companies churned out slasher films Final Exam, Bloody Birthday, Hell Night, Don't Go in the Woods... Alone!, Wes Craven's Deadly Blessing and Graduation Day. Fantasy and sci-fi genres continued to blend with the slasher film in Strange Behavior, Ghostkeeper and Evilspeak. The international market found Italy's Absurd and Madhouse and Germany's Bloody Moon.

=== 1982 ===
Straight-to-video productions cut costs to maximize profit. The independent horror film Madman opened in New York City's top 10, according to Variety, but soon fell out of theaters for a much healthier life on home video. The Dorm That Dripped Blood and Honeymoon Horror, each made for between $50–90,000, became successful in the early days of VHS. Because of this change, independent productions began having difficulties finding theatrical distribution. Girls Nite Out had a very limited release in 1982 but was re-released in 1983 in more theaters until finally finding a home on VHS. Paul Lynch's Humongous was released through AVCO Embassy Pictures, but a change in management severely limited the film's theatrical release. Films such as Hospital Massacre and Night Warning enjoyed strong home rentals from video stores, though Dark Sanity, The Forest, Unhinged, Trick or Treats, and Island of Blood fell into obscurity with little theatrical releases and only sub-par video transfers.

Supernatural slasher films continued to build in popularity with The Slayer, The Incubus, Blood Song, Don't Go to Sleep and Superstition (the supernatural-themed Halloween III: Season of the Witch, though part of the Halloween franchise, does not adhere to the slasher film formula). Alone in the Dark was New Line Cinema's first feature film, released to little revenue and initially dismissed by critics, though the film has gained critical reappraisal. Director Amy Holden Jones and writer Rita Mae Brown gender-swapped to showcase exploitative violence against men in The Slumber Party Massacre, while Visiting Hours pitted liberal feminism against macho right-wing bigotry with exploitative results.

Friday the 13th Part III, the first slasher trilogy, was an enormous success, selling 12 million tickets and dethroning E.T.: The Extra Terrestrial from the top of the box office. The film's iconic hockey mask has grown to pop-culture iconography. Universal Pictures had a tiny release for Death Valley, while Columbia Pictures found modest success with Silent Rage. Independent distributor Embassy Pictures released The Seduction to a surprising 3.9 million admissions, making a hit erotic slasher-thriller that predates blockbusters Fatal Attraction (1987) and Basic Instinct (1992) by several years.

Internationally, Australia released Next of Kin while Puerto Rico's Pieces was filmed in Boston and Madrid by an Italian-American producer with a Spanish director. Italian gialli saw slasher film influences in their releases for Sergio Martino's The Scorpion with Two Tails, Lucio Fulci's The New York Ripper and Dario Argento's Tenebrae.

=== 1983 ===
Traditional slasher films saw less frequent output. The House on Sorority Row followed the same general plot as Prom Night (1980) with guilty teens stalked and punished for a terrible secret. The Final Terror borrows visual and thematic elements from Just Before Dawn (1981), as Sweet Sixteen borrows from Happy Birthday to Me (1981). The most successful slasher of the year was Psycho II, which sold over 11 million theatrical admissions. The film also reunited original Psycho (1960) cast members Anthony Perkins and Vera Miles. 10 to Midnight, inspired by the real-life crimes of Richard Speck, promoted star Charles Bronson's justice-for-all character above its horror themes. Robert Hiltzik's Sleepaway Camp was a home video hit, being unique for its pubescent victims and themes of paedophilia and transvestism. Sleepaway Camp featured homosexual scenes, which were taboo at the time.

In Canada, whodunit Curtains had a brief theatrical life before finding new life on VHS, while criticism toward American Nightmare's portrayal of prostitutes, drug addicts, and pornography addicts hurt its video rentals. Sledgehammer was shot-on-video for just $40,000, with a gender-reversal climax showing Playgirl model Ted Prior as a "final guy." Other home video slashers from the year include Blood Beat, Double Exposure, and Scalps, the latter claiming to be one of the most censored films in history. Releases began to distance from the genre. The poster for Mortuary features a hand bursting from the grave, though the undead have nothing to do with the film. Distributors were aware of fading box office profits, and they were attempting to hoodwink audiences into thinking long-shelved releases like Mortuary were different.

=== 1984 ===
The public had largely lost interest in theatrically released slashers, drawing a close to the Golden Age. Production rates plummeted and major studios all but abandoned the genre that, only a few years earlier, had been very profitable. Many 1984 slasher films with brief theatrical runs found varying degrees of success on home video, such as Splatter University, Satan's Blade, Blood Theatre, Rocktober Blood and Fatal Games. Movies like The Prey and Evil Judgement were filmed years prior and finally were given small theatrical releases. Silent Madness used 3D to ride the success of Friday the 13th Part III (1982), though the effect did not translate to the VHS format.

Friday the 13th: The Final Chapter brought the saga of Jason Voorhees to a close, with his demise the main marketing tool. It worked, with The Final Chapter selling 10 million tickets in North America, hinting the series would continue even if Jason's demise marked a shift in the genre.

This shift was emphasized by the controversy from Silent Night, Deadly Night (1984): Unlike the recent appearance of other Christmas horror films, including the same year's Don't Open till Christmas, promotional material for Silent Night, Deadly Night pictured a killer Santa with the tagline: "He knows when you've been naughty!" According to Going to Pieces: The Rise and Fall of the Slasher Film, a 2006 documentary, the movie "became the flashpoint, igniting protests across the nation". Protesters picketed theaters playing the film with placards reading, "Deck the hall with holly – not bodies!" Released in November 1984 by TriStar Pictures, persistent carol-singers forced one Bronx cinema to pull Silent Night, Deadly Night a week into its run. The widespread outrage led to the film's removal, with only 741,500 tickets sold.

As interest in the Golden Age slasher waned, Wes Craven's A Nightmare on Elm Street revitalized the genre by mixing fantasy and the supernatural in a cost-effective way. Craven had toyed with slasher films before in Deadly Blessing (1981), though he was frustrated that the genre he had helped create with The Last House on the Left (1972) and The Hills Have Eyes (1977) had not benefited him financially. Developing A Nightmare on Elm Street since 1981, Craven recognized time running out due to declining revenues from theatrical slasher film releases. A Nightmare on Elm Street and especially its villain Freddy Krueger (Robert Englund) became cultural phenomenons. On a budget of just $1.8 million, the film was a commercial success, grossing more than $25.5 million (7.6 million admissions) in North America and launched one of the most successful film series in history. A Nightmare on Elm Street provided the success that New Line Cinema needed to become a major Hollywood company. To this day, New Line is referred to as "The House That Freddy Built". The final slasher film released during the Golden Age, The Initiation, was greatly overshadowed by A Nightmare on Elm Street (though both films feature dreams as plot points and a horribly burned "nightmare man"). The success of A Nightmare on Elm Street welcomed in a new wave of horror films that relied on special effects, almost completely silencing the smaller low-budget Golden Age features.

== 1984–1995: Direct-to-video films and franchises ==
Despite A Nightmare on Elm Street's success, fatigue hit the slasher genre, and its popularity had declined substantially. The home video revolution, fueled by the popularity of VHS, provided a new outlet for low-budget filmmaking. Without major studio backing for theatrical release, slasher films became second only to pornography in the home video market. The drop in budgets to accommodate a more economic approach was usually met with a decline in quality. Holdovers filmed during the Golden Age such as Too Scared to Scream (filmed in 1981, released in 1985), The Mutilator (filmed in 1984, released in 1985), Blood Rage (filmed in 1983, released in 1987), Killer Party (filmed in 1984, released in 1986) and Mountaintop Motel Massacre (filmed in 1983, released in 1986) found video distribution.

Mirroring the punk rock movement, novice filmmakers proved anyone could make a movie on home video, resulting in shot-on-video slashers Blood Cult (1985), The Ripper (1985), Spine (1986), Truth or Dare? (1986), Killer Workout (1987), and Death Spa (1989). Lesser-known horror properties Sleepaway Camp, The Slumber Party Massacre and Silent Night, Deadly Night became series on home video. The Hills Have Eyes Part 2 (1985) and Friday the 13th: A New Beginning (1985) were theatrically released but neither film was embraced by fans or critics and took steep box office declines from their predecessors; still, Friday the 13th: A New Beginning was a modest hit, opening at the top of the box office and finishing its run with 6.2 million admissions. Rushed into production, A Nightmare on Elm Street 2: Freddy's Revenge (1985) became the highest grossing horror film of 1985. The success of the first two Elm Street films inspired a wave of "dream" slashers that included Dreamaniac (1986), Bad Dreams (1988), Deadly Dreams (1988), and Dream Demon (1988). Of those films, Bad Dreams was a minor hit with 2.4 million admissions.

Paramount Pictures released the parody April Fool's Day (1986) with hopes to start a sister series to its Friday the 13th property, though the film's modest 3.5 million admissions never led to a series. Three other spoofs, Evil Laugh (1986), The Texas Chainsaw Massacre 2 (1986) and Friday the 13th Part VI: Jason Lives (1986), were box office disappointments; Texas Chainsaw Massacre 2 sold just 2 million tickets while Jason Lives sold 5.2 million, both significantly down from their predecessors. The home video market saw the output of low-budget, tongue-in-cheek slashers like Stripped to Kill (1987), Return to Horror High (1987), and Killer Workout (1987), and previous franchises forgoing theaters for direct-to-video self-parody sequels in Hello Mary Lou: Prom Night II (1987), Silent Night, Deadly Night Part 2 (1987), Slumber Party Massacre II (1987), Sleepaway Camp II: Unhappy Campers (1988), and Sleepaway Camp III: Teenage Wasteland (1989).

Trying to cater the public of adult action thrillers that were popular in the 1980s, Sylvester Stallone's cop-thriller Cobra (1986) is a thinly veiled slasher film advertised as an action movie, and sold 13.2 million tickets. The home video market made stars out of character actors such as Terry O'Quinn and Bruce Campbell, whose respective independent horror-thrillers The Stepfather (1987) and Maniac Cop (1988) found more support on home video than in theaters. Quinn returned for Stepfather II (1989) but chose not to reprise his role in Stepfather III (1992), Destroyer (1988), while Campbell followed a similar route with a cameo in Maniac Cop 2 (1990) and no participation in Maniac Cop III: Badge of Silence (1993).

The Nightmare on Elm Street series dominated the late 1980s horror wave, with A Nightmare on Elm Street 3: Dream Warriors (1987) selling 11.5 million tickets in North America, and A Nightmare on Elm Street 4: The Dream Master (1988) following another 12 million tickets. By comparison, Friday the 13th Part VII: The New Blood (1988) and Halloween 4: The Return of Michael Myers (1988) sold approximately 4.5 million tickets each, less than half of the Elm Street films. The personality-driven appeal of Freddy Krueger was not lost on filmmakers, as characters like Chucky and Candyman were given ample dialogue and placed in urban settings that had largely been ignored by the Golden Age. Chucky's Child's Play (1988) and its 1990 sequel sold over 14.7 million tickets combined, while Candyman (1992) sold a healthy 6.2 million. Both series fell out rather quickly, when Child's Play 3 (1991) selling only 3.5 million tickets in North America and Candyman: Farewell to the Flesh (1995) selling only 3.2 million.

Internationally, the slasher film remained profitable. Mexico released Zombie Apocalypse (1985), Don't Panic (1988), Grave Robbers (1990) and Hell's Trap (1990). Europe saw releases from Sweden's Blood Tracks (1985), The United Kingdom's Lucifer (1987), Spain's Anguish (1987), Italy's StageFright (1987), BodyCount (1987) and Dutch slasher Amsterdamned (1988). In the Pacific, Australia released Symphony of Evil (1987), Houseboat Horror (1989), and Bloodmoon (1990), while Japan released Evil Dead Trap (1988).

By 1989 the major series had faded from public interest, resulting in box office failures from Friday the 13th Part VIII: Jason Takes Manhattan, A Nightmare on Elm Street 5: The Dream Child, and Halloween 5: The Revenge of Michael Myers. The Dream Child's 5.6 million tickets were a sharp decline, while Jason Takes Manhattan and The Revenge of Michael Myers each sold roughly 3 million tickets. Due to the declining ticket sales, rights to the Friday the 13th and Halloween series were sold to New Line Cinema and Miramax Films, respectively. Now owning both the Jason Voorhees and Freddy Krueger characters, New Line would look into a series-crossover event film. Freddy's Dead: The Final Nightmare (1991) and Jason Goes to Hell: The Final Friday (1993) began this crossover series, but profit losses from both films stalled the project for a decade. Halloween: The Curse of Michael Myers (1995) was released under Miramax's Dimension Films banner to negative fan reaction and a weak box office, forcing its producers to reboot the franchise with the next entry.

== 1996–2002: Genre revival ==
Wes Craven's New Nightmare (1994) used characters from his original Elm Street film in self-referential and ironic ways, as the actors played versions of their true personas targeted by a movie-inspired demon. Despite solid critical reviews, New Nightmare failed to attract moviegoers and sold only 2.3 million tickets the North American box office, the lowest of any Elm Street film. The slasher genre's surprising meta-resurgence came in the form of Craven's sleeper hit Scream (1996). Directed by Craven and written by Kevin Williamson, Scream juggled postmodern humor with visceral horror. The film played on nostalgia for the golden age of slasher films, but appealed to a younger audience with contemporary stars and popular music. Williamson, a self-confessed fan of slasher films, wrote the characters as well-versed in horror film lore and knowing all the clichés that the audience were aware of. With 23.3 million admissions, Scream became both the highest grossing slasher film of all time and the first of the genre to cross $100 million at the domestic box office, making it the most successful horror film since The Silence of the Lambs (1991). The marketing for Scream distanced itself from the slasher genre as it passed itself as a "new thriller" that showcased the celebrity of its stars Drew Barrymore, Courteney Cox and Neve Campbell over its horror elements.

Williamson's follow-up, I Know What You Did Last Summer (1997), was inspired by Prom Night (1980) and The House on Sorority Row (1983). Released less than a year after Scream to "critic proof" success, the film sold nearly 16 million tickets at the North American box office. Two months later Dimension Films released Scream 2 (1997) to the highest grossing opening weekend of any R-rated film at the time; the sequel sold 22 million tickets and was a critical hit. Taking note of the marketing success of Scream, the promotional materials for I Know What You Did Last Summer and Scream 2 relied heavily on the recognizability of cast-members Portia de Rossi, Rebecca Gayheart, Sarah Michelle Gellar, Heather Graham, Jennifer Love Hewitt, Joshua Jackson, Laurie Metcalf, Jerry O'Connell, Ryan Phillippe, Jada Pinkett, Freddie Prinze Jr. and Liev Schreiber.

The two Scream films and I Know What You Did Last Summer were also popular in international markets. In Asia, Hong Kong released The Deadly Camp (1999) and South Korea released Bloody Beach (2000), The Record (2001), and Nightmare (2000). Australia's postmodern slasher Cut (2000) cast American actress Molly Ringwald as its heroine. Britain released Lighthouse (1999) and the Netherlands had two teen slashers, School's Out (1999) and The Pool (2001). Bollywood produced two unofficial remakes of I Know What You Did Last Summer: the first was a musical-slasher hybrid called Kucch To Hai (2003), while the second was a more straightforward slasher called Dhund: The Fog (2003).

Scream 2 marked a high-point of public interest in the 1990s slasher revival with a massive marketing campaign and a cultural zeitgeist. This anticipation greenlit the production of several other slasher films to be released the following year. Urban Legend (1998) was a reasonable hit, selling 8 million tickets, though its decline from the Scream films and I Know What You Did Last Summer showed that slasher film sales were already starting to decline. Three 1998 sequels were each significant successes at the domestic box office; Halloween H20: 20 Years Later had 11.7 million admissions, Bride of Chucky had 6.9 million admissions, and I Still Know What You Did Last Summer had 8.9 million admissions. Again, the marketing for these sequels relied on the appeal their casts, which included Adam Arkin, Jack Black, LL Cool J, Jamie Lee Curtis, Joseph Gordon-Levitt, Josh Hartnett, Katherine Heigl, Brandy Norwood, Jodi Lynn O'Keefe, Mekhi Phifer, John Ritter, Jennifer Tilly, and Michelle Williams. Low-budget slasher films The Clown at Midnight (1998) and Cherry Falls (2000) had trouble competing with big-budget horror films that could afford bankable actors.

Scream 3 (2000), the first entry in the Scream series not written by Kevin Williamson, was another huge success with 16.5 million tickets sold, though poor word-of-mouth prevented it from reaching the heights of the first two Scream films. Urban Legends: Final Cut (2000) sold a meager 4 million tickets, less than half of what its predecessor had sold just two years earlier. The third films in the I Know What You Did Last Summer and Urban Legend sequels were relegated to the direct-to-video market with a lack of bankable stars.

After the turn of the millennium, the post-Scream wave of slasher films were both critically and financially disappointing, leading to the genre's sharp decline. These films include 2001's Valentine (11% Rotten Tomatoes, 3.5 million admissions) and Jason X (19% Rotten Tomatoes, 2.3 million admissions), and 2002's Halloween: Resurrection (10% Rotten Tomatoes, 5.2 million admissions). In development for 17 years with 17 different writers attached to at different points, New Line Cinema's Freddy vs. Jason (2003) took note from the Scream films and mixed nostalgia and self-aware humor with recognizable actors. It sold a massive 14 million tickets at the domestic box office and beat Scream 2's record opening weekend for a slasher film with a gross of $36.4 million over three days.

== 2003–present: Postmodern slashers ==
Successful horror films including Final Destination (2000), Jeepers Creepers (2001) and American Psycho (2000) used slasher tropes but deviated from the standard formula set forth by movies such as Halloween (1978), A Nightmare on Elm Street (1984) and Scream (1996). The filmmakers behind Make a Wish (2002) and HellBent (2004) diversified their films to appeal to LGBT audiences. African American filmmakers with largely black casts in Killjoy (2000), Holla If I Kill You (2003), Holla (2006), and Somebody Help Me (2007).

2003 saw a turning point and minor-revival of the slasher where filmmakers sought to return the genre to its grittier, exploitative roots. 2003 saw the release of 20th Century Fox's Wrong Turn. Made on a $12.6 million budget, Wrong Turn continued Scream's trend of starring popular actors like Eliza Dushku and Desmond Harrington, but returned to the violent and exploitative approach of films like The Hills Have Eyes (1977) and Just Before Dawn (1981). Wrong Turn sold 2.5 million admissions and launched a successful series of straight-to-video sequels.

=== Remakes and reboots ===
The Texas Chainsaw Massacre (2003) became a sleeper hit by playing on public's familiarity of the 1974 original but promising updated thrills and suspense. The Texas Chainsaw Massacre remake sold over 13.5 million tickets in North America and was followed by The Texas Chainsaw Massacre: The Beginning (2006), which sold a respectable 6 million tickets, though it was still struck by diminishing returns.

Riding on the success of the Chainsaw Massacre remake was House of Wax (2005), Black Christmas (2006), April Fool's Day (2008), Train (2008). Rob Zombie's Halloween (2007) took the simplicity of the original 1978 film but added an extreme vision that, according to critics, replaced everything that made the first film a success. Zombie's Halloween sold nearly 8.5 million tickets, but its negative reception hurt its sequel Halloween II (2009), which sold under 4.5 million tickets. Extreme post-9/11 violence hit its peak with The Hills Have Eyes (2006) and its sequel The Hills Have Eyes 2 (2007); the 2006 Hills Have Eyes was a financial success with 6.4 admissions, while its 2007 sequel received less enthusiasm with only 3 million admissions.

The remake-era peaked in 2009 with releases of My Bloody Valentine, Friday the 13th, The Last House on the Left, Sorority Row, The Stepfather and Halloween II. Of those, Friday the 13th was most successful selling 8.7 million tickets and Sorority Row was least successful with under 1.6 million tickets sold. The following year A Nightmare on Elm Street remake, like the Friday the 13th remake, had a large opening weekend but quickly fell off the box office charts after with 7.8 million admissions. Straight-to-video remakes Mother's Day (2010), Silent Night (2012) and Silent Night, Bloody Night: The Homecoming (2013) were met with little reception or praise. Released on 3D format, the reboot Texas Chainsaw (2013) acts as a direct sequel to the 1974 original film, but its lackluster box office profits (4.2 million admissions) led to its prequel Leatherface (2017) being a direct-to-download release (Leatherface was filmed in 2015 but shelved for two years).

Coming off the success of the Paranormal Activity and Insidious franchises, Jason Blum and his Blumhouse Productions began looking into rebooting popular slasher titles with "legacy sequels" that largely ignored the proceeding films in favor of new chapters, though not strict remakes. Blumhouse teamed with popular television showrunner Ryan Murphy to produce a metafictional sequel to The Town That Dreaded Sundown (1976), though the newer film received mixed critical reviews and failed financially with an estimated $154,418 in streaming sales. For their next slasher film, Blumhouse recruited director David Gordon Green and writer Danny McBride to reunite producer/composer John Carpenter and star Jamie Lee Curtis for Halloween (2018). As a direct sequel to Carpenter's 1978 original film that ignored all other films in the franchise, 2018's Halloween opened to record-breaking numbers, including the largest debut for a slasher film and the largest debut of a female-led horror film. The film was a massive success and would go on to sell 17.4 million tickets at the domestic box office, second only to the 1978 original and the first two Scream films in terms of audience attendance for a slasher film. The film's success spawned two sequels, Halloween Kills (2021) and Halloween Ends (2022), though they were struck with diminishing returns by selling a respective 9 million and 6.1 million tickets during their domestic runs. Blumhouse and Universal Pictures re-teamed to release a second remake of Black Christmas in 2019, which was poorly received and bombed at the box office.

The enormous financial success of 2018's Halloween inspired other legacy sequels. In 2021, the Jordan Peele produced Candyman (2021) sold approximately 6 million tickets and brought back original stars Vanessa Estelle Williams and Tony Todd. The directing team Radio Silence rebooted the Scream franchise in 2022 by uniting original actors Neve Campbell, Courteney Cox, and David Arquette with new stars including Melissa Barrera and Jenna Ortega. 2022's Scream became a sleeper hit with 8 million admissions, and the following year Scream VI sold an impressive 10.3 million tickets at the domestic box office. Like Halloween, Netflix's Texas Chainsaw Massacre (2022) brought back its franchise's famous villain (Leatherface) to face off against its original final girl (Sally Hardesty, played by Olwen Fouéré replacing the late Marilyn Burns). Texas Chainsaw Massacre was marred by production difficulties and received negative critical reviews, though it still received high viewership. Buddy Cooper, director of The Mutilator (1985), reunited with his film's original stars for Mutilator 2, which was released onto VOD in 2025.

=== Television works ===
In the early 2010s, the success of FX's American Horror Story and AMC's The Walking Dead encouraged network television to develop horror franchises as series. Several networks structured or based their developing TV series on slasher films. A&E produced Bates Motel as a contemporary prequel to Alfred Hitchcock's 1960s classic Psycho, which depicted the lives of Norman Bates (Freddie Highmore) and his deranged mother Norma (Vera Farmiga). The series remains A&E's longest-running scripted drama program, and particular praise was given to Highmore and Farmiga, with the latter receiving a Primetime Emmy nomination.

MTV tried to ride off the success of Bates Motel by producing Scream: The TV Series. Being a completely different story from the film series and not featuring the iconic Ghostface villain, Scream: The TV Series ran for two seasons between 2015 and 2016. After the conclusion of its second season, a two-hour Halloween special aired in October 2016. A third season was released by VH1 in 2019 titled Scream: Resurrection, which used the Ghostface moniker, though was met with negative reviews and poor ratings. A TV remake of The Bad Seed aired on Lifetime in fall 2018. In October 2021, Child's Play creator Don Mancini continued his flagship franchise by moving its story to the small screen with Syfy Channel's Chucky. Starring Child's Play regulars Brad Dourif, Jennifer Tilly, Fiona Dourif, and Alex Vincent, Chucky has received critical acclaim and ran for three seasons. Also in 2021, Amazon released one season of I Know What You Did Last Summer, a modern adaptation of Lois Duncan's 1973 novel and the 1997 slasher of the same title. Like Freeform's Pretty Little Liars and The CW's Riverdale, the I Know What You Did Last Summer series took more restrained approaches to the young adult demographic and toned down the slasher violence. Bryan Fuller is currently writing a Friday the 13th television series titled Crystal Lake for A24 and Peacock.

Slasher anthologies allowed filmmakers to explore new settings and mysteries every season. In 2015, Ryan Murphy, the creator of American Horror Story, produced the comedy-slasher series Scream Queens for Fox. Starring Jamie Lee Curtis, Emma Roberts, Keke Palmer, Niecy Nash, Billie Lourd, and Abigail Breslin, the series developed a devoted cult following but was cancelled after two seasons. Created by Aaron Martin, an anthology series simply titled Slasher premiered on the streaming platform Chiller in 2016. The first season, subtitled The Executioner, received positive reviews. Slasher moved to Netflix for its second and third seasons, titled Guilty Party and Solstice, and then to Shudder for its fourth and fifth seasons, titled Flesh & Blood and Ripper. In 2022, writer Ryan J. Brown debuted his comedy-horror series Wreck on BBC Three which takes inspiration from slasher and horror fiction.

=== Recent works ===
Adam Wingard directed two films that put postmodern spins on the slasher genre: You're Next (2011) and The Guest (2014), both of which were critical successes with 80% and 93% respectively on Rotten Tomatoes. The home invasion slasher Don't Breathe (2016) was a commercial success with 10.3 million admissions and an 88% critical approval on Rotten Tomatoes. More traditional slasher movies like The Strangers: Prey at Night (2018), Hell Fest (2018), Haunt (2019) and There's Someone Inside Your House (2021) found success on streaming services such as Shudder and Netflix, while Eli Roth's long-awaited Thanksgiving (2023) was a minor hit at the box office with 3.5 million admissions.

A series of original, low-budget slasher franchises began to emerge in the early 2020s. Damien Leone's Terrifier (2016) drew attention for its villain Art the Clown (David Howard Thornton) and its inventive practical effects, but its perceived as misogynistic violence became controversial and the film failed to catch on with the general public. Leone's kickstarter-funded sequel Terrifier 2 (2022) received much more attention and positive reviews (86% on Rotten Tomatoes) with many reviewers commenting on the development of its final girl (played by Lauren LaVera). Released by Bloody Disgusting, Terrifier 2 became a box office success with over one million domestic admissions. Terrifier 3 was released in 2024 with Leone, Thornton, and LaVera returning. The film became the highest-grossing unrated film of all time, raking in over $50 million in box office. Also working on low-budgets for independent distributor A24, director Ti West delivered a trilogy of slashers that received critical acclaim. West's first film, the 1970s-set X (2022), starred Mia Goth, Scott Mescudi, Brittany Snow, and Jenna Ortega and scored 94% on Rotten Tomatoes and sold over a million tickets. West reunited with Goth for X's 1920s-set prequel Pearl (2022), which scored even higher at 93% and sold just under a million tickets. Both X and Pearl were successful on streaming downloads. X's 1980s-set sequel MaXXXine, the final film in the trilogy, also stars Goth and was released in 2024.

Blumhouse Productions released Happy Death Day in 2017. Pitched as Groundhog Day (1993) meets Scream (1996), the film was a sleeper hit, selling 6.2 million tickets at the box office. It was followed by Happy Death Day 2U in 2019, which only had half its predecessor's admissions with 3 million tickets sold. Happy Death Day's director, Christopher Landon, returned for Freaky (2020), which mixed Freaky Friday (2003) with Friday the 13th (1980). Starring Kathryn Newton and Vince Vaughn, Freaky was released during the COVID-19 Pandemic, becoming a hit on streaming services and received favorable critical reviews. The success of Happy Death Day and Freaky inspired a wave of high-concept slasher comedies, including Totally Killer and It's a Wonderful Knife (both 2023).

== See also ==
- Extreme cinema
- Hack and slash
- Postmodern horror
- Social thriller
- Video nasty
- Vulgar auteurism

=== Lists ===
- List of horror films set in academic institutions
- List of horror film villains

== Works cited ==
- DiMarie, Philip C., ed. (2011). Movies in American History: An Encyclopedia. Vol. 1. ABC-CLIO. ISBN 978-1-598-84296-8.
- Kerswell, J.A. (2012). The Slasher Movie Book. Chicago, Ill.: Chicago Review Press. ISBN 978-1556520105. OCLC 761851819.
- Nowell, Richard (2011). Blood money: a history of the first teen slasher film cycle. New York: Continuum. ISBN 9781441188502. OCLC 701057235.
