= Don't Go in the Woods (1981 film) =

1981 American slasher film directed by James Bryan

Don't Go in the Woods... Alone!
- Theatrical poster
- Directed by: James Bryan
- Screenplay by: Garth Eliassen
- Story by: Garth Eliassen
- Produced by: James Bryan; Suzette Gomez; Roberto Gomez
- Starring: Jack McClelland; Mary Gail Artz; James P. Hayden; Angie Brown
- Cinematography: Hank Zinman
- Music by: H. Kingsley Thurber
- Production company: JBF
- Distributed by: Seymour Borde & Associates
- Release date: November 20, 1981
- Running time: 82 minutes
- Country: United States
- Language: English
- Budget: $150,000

Don't Go in the Woods (also known as Don't Go in the Woods... Alone!) is a 1981 American slasher film directed by James Bryan and written by Garth Eliassen. The film follows four campers confronted by a murderous woodsman slaying hikers on a wooded mountainside. It is one of the infamous "video nasties" banned in the United Kingdom in the 1980s.

== Plot ==
A frightened woman is running down a small stream when an unseen assailant murders her. Soon after, a bird watcher is also murdered.

Meanwhile, four friends (Peter, Joanne, Ingrid, and Craig) are trekking through the wilderness. Unbeknownst to them, another tourist gets thrown over a waterfall—landing near some oblivious frolickers, and his mother is wounded and dragged away. The four backpackers set up camp for the night. Elsewhere, a pair of honeymooners named Dick and Cherry get attacked. Dick is murdered when he exits the van to investigate a noise. Cherry, now paranoid, arms herself with a small bust. The killer throws Dick's body against one of the windows and starts to rock the van back and forth, tumbling it down a small hill, where it catches on fire with Cherry still inside. The next day, the two couples continue their hike; meanwhile, the killer stabs to death an artist painting a scenic view and kidnaps her young daughter.

Two wild men, wielding furs and rags. Peter rushes off to warn his friends, but the maniac gets to them first, slicing Craig's arm off. Craig screams, attracting Ingrid to investigate, and Joanne flees into the woods alone. Ingrid finds the aftermath of Craig and Joanne's campsite and runs away. Peter later finds Ingrid at another person's wrecked camp before the two come across the wild man's cabin and go inside. They find several sleeping bags hanging from the ceiling and junk littered across the floor. Peter accidentally triggers a trap that reveals Craig's body wrapped in a plastic sheet. Peter and Ingrid flee the cabin. A hiker finds a stick covered in tiny metal objects and takes it; Peter and Ingrid hear the stick jingling, and Peter wounds him, mistaking him for the wild man. The killer tosses a sharpened stick at the hiker, killing him. Then, he wounds Ingrid with two of the spears. Before he can finish her off, Peter grabs her hand, and they escape. They walk several miles before finding a chairlift and seeing a small town, which they enter.

Irrational, driven by guilt over leaving Joanne behind, Peter escapes from the hospital where he and Ingrid are brought and returns to the woods. Joanne finds a campsite containing a dead body and flees in terror. She sees the wild man's cabin. Joanne encounters the wild man and attempts to escape through an open window, but gets hacked to death with a machete. The police form a posse that includes Ingrid to hunt down the maniac and find Peter and Joanne. The sheriff finds the cabin, where he uncovers Joanne's body, leaving Peter even more distraught.

The wild man claims another victim—a man in a wheelchair who is decapitated by nightfall. Ingrid steals a machete and looks for Peter. She finds him by morning, along with the savage whom they stabbed to death in a frenzy, only stopping when the search party arrives. As everyone leaves the forest, the baby taken from the artist is shown alone in the wilderness, playing with a hatchet.

== Cast ==
- Jack McClelland as Peter
- Mary Gail Artz as Ingrid
- James P. Hayden as Craig
- Angie Brown as Joanne
- Ken Carter as Sheriff
- David Barth as Deputy Benson
- Larry Roupe as Store Owner
- Amy Martell as Artist's Child
- Tom Drury as Maniac
- Laura Trefts as Doctor Maggie

== Production ==
After the release of his earlier film Boogie Vision, director James Bryan decided on making a horror film set in the Rocky Mountains as his next project. The film was supposedly based on local rumors about a number of hitchhikers who had reportedly fallen victim to a suspected serial killer.

The film was shot on a budget of $150,000 in the summer of 1980, during the director's seven-year sojourn. It was shot in outdoor locations, partly in order to save money on the film's lighting. Parts of the film were shot in Brighton, Utah.

== Release ==
Don't Go in the Woods was released regionally in the United States, opening in six theaters in the Salt Lake City area on November 20, 1981, and subsequently screening in Provo on November 27.

In the 1980s, the film was deemed a video nasty in the United Kingdom, and subsequently banned by issuance of the Video Recordings Act. Aside from an early rare video release, it was not available for rent or sale in the UK until 2007, when it was released uncut on DVD with a 15 certificate. It was classified as R18 in New Zealand for its violence. On 8 February 2015, Vinegar Syndrome re-released the film in a limited screening at the Alamo Drafthouse Cinema in Yonkers, New York, and on March 10, 2015, they released the film for the first time on Blu-ray.

== Critical reception ==
Linda Gross, a critic for the Los Angeles Times, called the film "a terrible turkey" and criticized the poor direction, screenplay and acting.

Paul Mavis, writing for DVD Talk, gave the film one-and-a-half stars out of five, calling it "a crappy little horror film made on a shoestring budget with people who really showed some grit in getting it done. That's fine, and more power to those people. But that doesn't make it good." Similarly, Dread Central, which awarded it two out of five, called it "a bad film", and also "an unpretentious bit of campy horror that's really just trying to have a good time." AllMovie wrote "This splatter hack-job was forged during the slasher gold rush of the early '80s, and though it's inept enough to inspire guffaws for those who find ineptness amusing, there's nothing to recommend for connoisseurs of horror." Don't Go in the Woods was also lambasted by DVD Verdict, which stated "Aside from one nasty bit with a bear trap and a sequence toward the end that faintly—and accidentally, believe me—recalls The Texas Chain Saw Massacre in its slow, dread-saturated buildup, director James Bryan's splatter film is an incoherent mess. An endless parade of victims keeps the fake blood squirting, but the murder sequences are so poorly staged that it's usually impossible to tell precisely what's happening. The most frightening thing about this alleged horror film, aside from its bad synthesizer soundtrack, is its pacing. Murder sequences are clumped together throughout the film, leaving a lot of flab in between."

== Sources ==
- D'Arc, James V. (2010). When Hollywood Came to Town: A History of Moviemaking in Utah (1st ed.). Layton, Utah: Gibbs Smith. ISBN 978-1-423-60587-4.
- Thrower, Stephen (2007). Nightmare USA. London, England: FAB Press. ISBN 978-1-903-25446-2.
