= The Howling (franchise) =

American media franchise

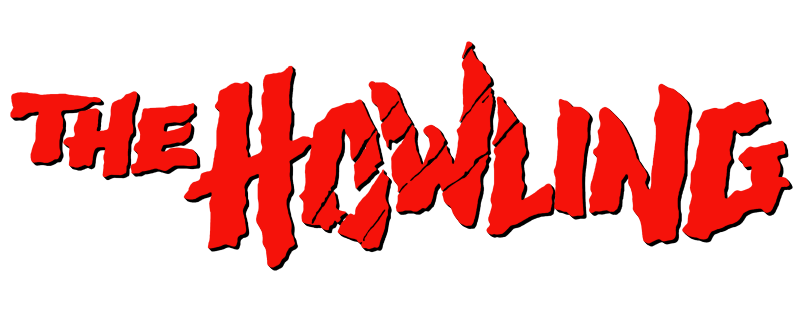
- Created by: Gary Brandner
- Original work: The Howling novel series by Gary Brandner

Print publications
- Novels: The Howling; The Howling II; The Howling III: Echoes
- Comics: The Howling: Revenge of the Werewolf Queen

Films and television
- Films: The Howling; Howling II: Your Sister Is a Werewolf; Howling III: The Marsupials; Howling IV: The Original Nightmare; Howling V: The Rebirth; Howling VI: The Freaks; Howling: New Moon Rising; The Howling: Reborn

The Howling is an American werewolf-themed horror media franchise that includes three novels and eight films. The series began with the 1977 horror novel The Howling by Gary Brandner, which was in 1981 adapted into the film of the same name, directed by Joe Dante.

== Novels ==
The novels were authored by American horror writer Gary Phil Brandner (1930–2013). The first book in the series was loosely adapted as a motion picture in 1981. Brandner's second and third Howling novels, published in 1979 and 1985, respectively, have no connection to the film series, though he was involved in writing the screenplay for the second Howling film, Howling II: Your Sister Is a Werewolf. He died of esophageal cancer in 2013.

=== The Howling (1977) ===
The Howling was first published in 1977, and republished in 1986 by Fawcett Publications.

After a violent act, Karyn Beatty and her husband, Roy, go to the peaceful California village of Drago to escape the savagery of the city, but, their lives together slowly become more separate. The novel was loosely adapted as a motion picture in 1981, and the closest adaptation is the fourth film in the Howling series, Howling IV: The Original Nightmare, though this film too varies to some degree.

=== The Howling II (1979) ===
The Howling II was first published in 1979, and later republished by Fawcett Publications in 1982 under the alternative titles The Howling II: The Return, and Return of the Howling.

The novel addresses the impact of events in the first novel, and how life has changed for Karyn Beatty and Chris Halloran within the last three years. Furthermore, the reader soon finds out that Roy and Marcia Lura have survived the destruction of Drago, and are now thirsty for vengeance.

=== The Howling III: Echoes (1985) ===
The Howling III, also known as The Howling III: Echoes, was published by Fawcett Publications in 1985.

In his last installment of the trilogy, Brandner gives readers new characters, a stand-alone plot, and a heavily re-imagined mythology which alters the times and events established in the first two books. The Howling III: Echoes is about a sympathetic, teenage werewolf named Malcolm who is being recruited by the evil werewolf, Derak, who wants him to learn his true heritage: blood.

== Films ==
Film	U.S. release date	Director(s)	Screenwriter(s)	Producer(s)
The Howling	1981	Joe Dante	John Sayles, Terence H. Winkless	Michael Finnell, Jack Conrad
Howling II: Your Sister Is a Werewolf	1985	Philippe Mora	Robert Sarno	Steven A. Lane
Howling III: The Marsupials	1987	Philippe Mora	Philippe Mora	Philippe Mora, Charles Waterstreet
Howling IV: The Original Nightmare	1988	John Hough	Freddie Rowe, Clive Turner	Harry Alan Towers, Clive Turner
Howling V: The Rebirth	1989	Neal Sundstrom	Clive Turner	Freddie Rowe, Clive Turner
Howling VI: The Freaks	1991	Hope Perello	Kevin Rock	Robert Pringle
Howling: New Moon Rising	1995	Clive Turner	Clive Turner	Kent Adamson, Clive Turner
The Howling: Reborn	2011	Joe Nimziki	Joe Nimziki, James Robert Johnston	Kevin Kasha, Joel Kastelberg, Ernst Etchie Stroh

=== The Howling (1981) ===
The first Howling film, directed by Joe Dante, stars Dee Wallace, Patrick Macnee, Dennis Dugan, and Robert Picardo. The film is based on the first book in the trilogy, but the plot is only vaguely similar. The Howling contains subtle humor that is not present in the novel.

=== Howling II: Your Sister is a Werewolf (1985) ===
The second Howling film, directed by Philippe Mora, stars Christopher Lee, Reb Brown, Marsha Hunt, and Sybil Danning. The Howling II is the only sequel in the series that features a plot that directly follows the original film's events, it is also the only Howling film to feature the input of the original novelist, Gary Brandner. Brandner was critical of the original 1981 film, which was only a loose adaptation of his 1977 novel, and some elements of this sequel may have been deliberately divergent from the previous film. After newswoman Karen White (Wallace)'s shocking on-screen transformation and violent death, her brother Ben (Brown) is approached by Stefan Crosscoe (Lee), a mysterious gentleman who claims that Karen was a werewolf. Providing videotaped evidence of the transformation, Crosscoe convinces Ben and Jenny Templeton (Anne McEnroe) to accompany him to Transylvania to battle Stirba (Danning), an immortal werewolf queen.

=== Howling III (1987) ===
The film was directed and written by Philippe Mora, and starred Barry Otto, Imogen Annesley, and Leigh Biolos. A scientist, Professor Henry Beckmeyer (Otto), discovers that there are marsupial werewolves in Australia and one of them, Jerboa (Annesley), works in a horror movie.

=== Howling IV: The Original Nightmare (1988) ===
John Hough directed Howling IV: The Original Nightmare, which starred Romy Windsor, Michael T. Weiss, and Antony Hamiliton. The Original Nightmare is not so much a sequel, but, a more faithful adaptation of Brandner's original novel with subtle alterations. The film focuses on Marie Adams (Windsor), a successful suspense author, who is sent to the small town of Drago by her husband Richard (Weiss) after suffering a nervous breakdown and becomes tormented by visions and werewolves.

=== Howling V: The Rebirth (1989) ===
The film was directed by Neal Sundstrom and starred Philip Davis, Victoria Catlin, Elizabeth Shé, and Ben Cole. A group of eclectic travelers attend the opening of a long-sealed European castle and are later slowly being killed off by a werewolf. Now, to survive they must find out which one of them is the murderer.

=== Howling VI: The Freaks (1991) ===
The film was directed by Hope Perello, and starred Brendan Hughes, Bruce Payne, and Michele Matheson. Like most movies in the series, The Freaks is based on The Howling trilogy of novels and contains minor elements from The Howling III: Echoes novel: Ian Richards (Hughes), a solitary drifter who is cursed as a sympathetic werewolf and later recruited by R.B. Harker (Payne), a supernatural being, as well as werewolves being used in carnival freak shows Harker, carnival owner, captures Ian to work for his carnival, where Ian is put on display with other human oddities. To further complicate matters, Harker too is a supernatural creature, a vampire, with a secret objective to recruit Ian by making him into a killer.

=== The Howling: New Moon Rising (1995) ===
Directed by, written by and starring Clive Turner, The Howling: New Moon Rising is the only sequel in the series since Howling II: Your Sister Is a Werewolf to attempt at continuity. Furthermore, the film utilizes footage from the Howling IV: The Original Nightmare, Howling V: The Rebirth, and Howling VI: The Freaks, featuring characters from each of those films.

After the arrival of a mysterious motorcyclist Tom Smith (Turner), the peace of a desert town is shattered by gruesome murders. A detective (John Ramsden) investigates the case, helped by Father John (John Huff), a priest who is certain the killings are the work of a werewolf, leading the two of them to uncover several clues that connect events from a majority of the latter part of the series.

=== The Howling: Reborn (2011) ===
The Howling: Reborn was directed by Joe Nimziki. The film stars Landon Liboiron, Lindsey Shaw and Ivana Miličević. The story is credited to the novel The Howling II. A teenage outcast named Will Kidman (Liboiron) discovers he is a werewolf and must battle a pack of the brutal creatures when they threaten him and his new girlfriend Eliana Wynter (Shaw).

=== Future ===
In May 2015, Emaji Entertainment obtained the rights to remake the original 1981 film. In 2020, Andy Muschietti was hired to direct a remake.

At CinemaCon 2026, StudioCanal announced that a rebooted version of The Howling was officially in development.

== Reception ==
=== Critical and public response ===
Year	Film	Rotten Tomatoes
1981	The Howling	77% (132 reviews)
1985	Howling II: Your Sister Is a Werewolf	33% (15 reviews)
1987	Howling III	23% (13 reviews)
1988	Howling IV: The Original Nightmare	N/A
1989	Howling V: The Rebirth	N/A
1991	Howling VI: The Freaks	N/A
1995	Howling: New Moon Rising	N/A
2011	The Howling: Reborn	17% (6 reviews)

== Comic book ==
A sequel comic book titled The Howling: Revenge of the Werewolf Queen was released in 2017, with events set weeks after the end of the first film. The comic book centers on Chris Halloran, who has been charged with the murder of Karen White, and is determined to prove the existence of werewolves to establish his defense.
