= Howling: New Moon Rising =

The Howling: New Moon Rising
- U.K. DVD cover
- Directed by: Clive Turner
- Screenplay by: Clive Turner
- Produced by: Clive Turner
- Starring: Clive Turner; Ernest Kester
- Cinematography: Andreas Kossak
- Edited by: Clive Turner
- Music by: Guy Moon
- Production company: Allied Entertainments
- Distributed by: New Line Home Video
- Release date: October 17, 1995
- Running time: 90 minutes
- Country: United Kingdom
- Language: English

The Howling: New Moon Rising (also released as Howling VII: Mystery Woman or simply Howling VII) is a 1995 British direct-to-video comedy horror film, directed, produced, and written by Clive Turner, the seventh film in The Howling film series. The film reuses footage from the previous three sequels in the Howling series, and features characters from each film. The plot follows a detective who uncovers several clues that connect events of the latter part of the series. It was followed by The Howling: Reborn in 2011.

== Synopsis ==
In Pioneertown, California, a number of livestock and people have been killed mysteriously, and this appears to be the work of a large animal. A woman's decayed corpse is found in the desert, and the detective investigating the case determines that the body is that of a woman called Marylou Summers, who had attended a circus in the area four weeks prior. Seeking assistance with the matter, the detective speaks to a Catholic priest, Father John. Father John believes werewolves are a result of demonic possession, and is certain the recent killings are the work of a werewolf.

Around the time the killings began, a mysterious Australian drifter named Ted Smith had recently arrived in town and began working at the local bar. Father John attempts to convince the detective that a werewolf is the culprit. Father John claims that his information goes back 500 years and is all true, telling him of a castle in Hungary that was the site of a mass murder-suicide. After the first massacre in 1489, the Spanish Inquisition declared the castle to be under the control of Satan, and attempted to burn it down, however this failed. The castle was then boarded up for 500 years until the communist government of Hungary decided to reopen it in 1987. In 1989, a group of tourists arrived and most were subsequently killed before the castle burned to the ground. The Hungarian government then covered up the incident.

Meanwhile, Ted begins to mingle with the local townsfolk, secretly recording his own enigmatic agendas into a tape recorder in his hotel room, and the townsfolk begin to suspect Ted is the one behind these sudden killings. Father John and the detective interview a local woman, Marie Adams, who had, years earlier, narrowly survived a werewolf attack in the town of Drago. Marie is later killed by the werewolf. Father John and the detective learn that, three years ago, a castle in Budapest, Hungary, had burned down. This came directly after a group of people was killed there. Father John claims that three years is how long it takes for a werewolf to fully mature and develop new abilities.

The town is now fully against Ted. Ted attempts to flee town when a local woman, Cheryl, gives him a ride. That night, at her home, "Cheryl" reveals herself to be the real werewolf, and that her real name is Marylou Summers, and the body in the desert was the real Cheryl. She reveals that she was the one behind the castle massacre three years prior. Marylou announces her intent to kill Ted and frame him as the werewolf, then leave town to start over. She attempts to kill Ted with a shotgun, only to realize it has been loaded with blanks. Ted and the detective had set her up. Marylou transforms into werewolf form and attempts to escape, only to be shot to death by a mob of the townsfolk who were outside waiting. With the whole situation behind them, Ted returns to the bar with the rest of the townsfolk and they have a dance as a way to apologize for accusing him of being the werewolf. Ted takes the mic and sings a song for everybody, ad-libbing some lines about werewolves into the song.

== Cast ==
- Clive Turner as Ted Smith
- John Huff as Father John
- John Ramsden as Detective
- Ernest Kester as Ernie
- Romy Windsor as Marie Adams
- Cheryl Allen as Cheryl
- Elizabeth Shé as Marylou Summers
- Jaqueline Armitage as Jaqueline
- Jim Lozano as Jim
- Robert Morwell as Bob
- Jim Brock as Brock
- Sally Harkham as Eveanne
- Claude Allen as Pappy
- Harriet Allen as Harriet
- Bonnie Lagassa as Bonnie
- Jack Holder as Jack

== Production ==
Initially Howling VII was intended to be shot back-to-back with Howling VI: The Freaks with Kevin Rock returning as screenwriter that would see the film as a direct sequel following the characters of Ian Richards (Brendan Hughes) and Winston Salem III (Sean Gregory Sullivan) to Budapest, Hungary. This idea was scrapped by the producers for budgetary reasons. LIVE Entertainment then became interested in reviving The Howling deciding to make a new film by taking several scenes from previous installments and shooting new footage to link the scenes together.

Clive Turner had worked on the Howling franchise since Howling III: The Marsupials in 1987, where he was an uncredited location manager. He went on to write Howling IV: The Original Nightmare and Howling V: The Rebirth. Turner was determined to make a seventh film that connected all of the unrelated Howling films together into one timeline. His original plan was to make a film that was mostly footage from the other films that would accomplish this task for little money, but he ultimately decided against this, though footage from the other movies still was used to a limited extent in the film. New Moon Rising is notable as it is the first Howling sequel since Howling II: Your Sister Is a Werewolf to make an attempt at continuity with other films. Romy Walthall reprised her role as Marie Adams, the protagonist of The Original Nightmare.

Clive Turner claimed Pioneertown was "one of his favorite towns", and wanted to shoot the film there as a tribute to the town and its eclectic residents. As such, all of the townsfolk act in the film and use their real names for their characters. The production was a disaster. Clive Turner and Roger Nall differed on the look of the werewolf. Turner wanted the werewolf to resemble the one from The Original Nightmare that Steve Johnson designed, while Nall wanted it to look completely different. The FX team headed by Jerry Macaluso tried to please both by going for the middle ground which ended up pleasing neither before making a completely original design on their own which tried to retain the style of Rob Bottin's werewolves from the original The Howling. Turner ultimately directed the film himself, taking over duties from Roger Nall, who was originally slated to direct before leaving the production over creative differences with Turner. Nall wanted to make a werewolf movie set in a small town, but Turner wanted to make a character-driven story which focused more on the hillbilly community in the small town and less on the werewolf. Like what he had done with The Original Nightmare, after Nall walked off the production, Turner reshot nearly 50% of the film over a three-day period after filming had initially wrapped.

Horror television personality Joe Bob Briggs received letters from Pioneertown residents after showing the film on MonsterVision. This inspired him to travel to Pioneertown to learn more about the film's bizarre production. Briggs claims that Pioneertown was originally built as a film set for westerns, but was later completely abandoned after the western genre declined in the 1960s. Pioneertown was later settled by bikers and a bar was established, as the only real business in the town. Briggs claimed that Howling 7 was "the first movie to be shot in Pioneertown in, probably, twenty years". Briggs also claimed that "Stand Up", the song performed by Claude "Pappy" Allen in the film, was a "one-hit wonder" from decades prior.

== Reception ==
Howling: New Moon Rising is almost universally regarded as the worst film in the Howling series due to its storyline, overuse of jokes and line dancing and reusing footage from prior films. Both Screen Rant and WhatCulture ranked the film last on their rankings of the Howling films. The Screen Rant article said: "This direct-to-video movie is terrible in about every possible way, and one of the main reasons is that the story is nearly nonexistent". The WhatCulture article said: "The picture also features extended sequences of said locals line dancing, resorts to fart humor and baked bean jokes and has what just might be the worst on screen werewolf transformation in history. So little of the plot is dedicated to werewolves, it all seems to play like a strange Public Service Announcement for this tiny hick town". TV Guide remarked that the film was "a new low for the franchise". Dread Central gave the film a negative review, likening it to Mystery Science Theater 3000 fare. Cinema-Crazed reviewed the film, and their review begins with: "Asking anyone to watch The Howling: New Moon Rising should be punishable by jail time and some kind of psychological examination".

However, in spite of the near universal hatred the film has received, it's something of a cult film among some "so bad it's good" film fans. Bloody Disgusting panned the film but said it was enjoyable nonetheless: "This movie is for B lovers only! On my list this ranks right up there with Troll 2 as the most hilarious bad movie ever made. ... If you are in the mood to watch some real trash, get a six pack, a buddy, and sit back and prepare yourself for the comedy of the century which is Howling: New Moon Rising". Film critic Alison Pregler aka "Obscurus Lupa" cited New Moon Rising as her favorite in the Howling franchise. Pregler claimed that, despite being "hysterically awful", she appreciated the film for trying to tie the films together and thought the film was "endearing" and a "labor of love". Mutant-Reviewers said: "This is a movie designed for a group viewing, quip making, and if alcohol should be involved I won't judge. ... This is an awful movie. The kind of awful that sails through unwatchable, passes amusing, and lands comfortably in comedic gold".

== Legacy ==
In 2022, Antonio Piluso from Hack The Movies did a lengthy review with special guest, Joe Bob Briggs, who had famously presented the film on TNT MonsterVision. Briggs claimed that Howling 7 was "one of the most mind-numbingly confusing accumulations of bad acting and incomprehensible plotting that I've ever seen in my life", and Piluso referred to it as "the strangest sequel ever made". However, Briggs showing the film on MonsterVision resulted in high ratings and he showed the film repeatedly after its original airing. New Moon Rising is the only Howling film to never get a DVD release in the United States, only being released on VHS and Laserdisc. According to Joe Bob Briggs, he asked New Line Cinema to release a remastered Blu-ray of the film, offering to even do a commentary track himself. However, Briggs was informed that a complete 35mm master cut had never been created from the original negatives, so they would need to completely re-edit the film in order for a re-release to even be possible. Briggs claimed that the producers have the 35mm negatives "in a box" and acknowledged that a new release is unlikely, but expressed hope that one day a re-release could happen because of the film's cult status. Briggs also stated that he had attempted to track Clive Turner down for an interview about the film, but was unable to locate him. Briggs was only able to learn that Turner had apparently moved back to his home country of Australia.
