= Howling III =

1987 film by Philippe Mora

Howling III: The Marsupials
- Elite Entertainment DVD cover
- Directed by: Philippe Mora
- Written by: Philippe Mora
- Based on: The Howling III: Echoes by Gary Brandner
- Produced by: Philippe Mora; Charles Waterstreet
- Starring: Barry Otto; Imogen Annesley; Leigh Biolos; Dagmar Bláhová; Ralph Cotterill; Barry Humphries
- Cinematography: Louis Irving
- Edited by: Lee Smith
- Music by: Allan Zavod
- Distributed by: CBS/Fox Video
- Release date: 13 November 1987
- Running time: 94 minutes
- Country: Australia
- Language: English
- Budget: $2 million or $1 million

Howling III (also known as Howling III: The Marsupials and The Marsupials: The Howling III) is a 1987 Australian comedy-horror film and the sequel to The Howling, directed by Philippe Mora and filmed on location in and around Sydney, Australia. Starring Barry Otto, Imogen Annesley and Max Fairchild, Howling III is the only PG-13 rated entry in the Howling film series and also the last film in the series to be released theatrically. In this sequel, werewolves have evolved, with females having marsupial-like pouches to nurse their young. Scientists attempt to study them, while soldiers try to track and kill them in the Australian Outback.

Although Gary Brandner, author of the Howling novel series, approved the director's purchase of the rights to the name The Howling and the screen credits claim that it is based on Brandner's novel The Howling III: Echoes, the novel is set in the United States and has a different story than the film, with only slight similarities in terms of plot and a sympathetic view of werewolves. This aspect would be revisited in Howling VI: The Freaks.

== Plot ==
Harry Beckmeyer, an Australian anthropologist, obtains film footage from 1905 that shows Australian Aborigine ceremonially sacrificing a wolf-like creature. Alarmed by the reports of a werewolf killing a man in Siberia, Beckmeyer tries to warn the U.S. president about widespread werewolf attacks, but the president is dismissive. Jerboa, a young Australian werewolf, flees her sexually abusive stepfather, Thylo. After spending the night on a park bench near the Sydney Opera House, she is spotted by a young American, Donny Martin, who offers her a role in a horror film, Shape Shifters Part 8. Jack Citron, the film's director, praises her natural talent and hires her immediately.

After Jerboa and Donny attend a film that depicts a werewolf transforming, she insists the scene is inaccurate and admits she is a werewolf to an unbelieving Donny. After they have sex, Donny notices that Jerboa's lower abdomen is covered in downy white fur and a large scar. At the wrap party for the film, Jerboa is exposed to a strobe light and starts transforming. She flees the party and is hit by a car. At the hospital, doctors find she has a marsupial-like pouch and striped fur on her back like a thylacine, an extinct carnivorous marsupial. They also discover that Jerboa is pregnant and question Donny about her unusual anatomy.

Beckmeyer's father disappears in the Outback shortly after recording a film of tribal villagers killing a werewolf. Three of Jerboa's sisters track her to Sydney and take her back to the pack's hidden werewolf town, Flow (wolf spelled backward). Beckmeyer and his colleague Professor Sharp spend the evening watching a visiting ballet troupe practice. They witness the prima ballerina, the Russian Olga Gorki, transform into a werewolf—to the horror of her troupe. After being captured and taken to a laboratory, she quickly escapes. She goes to Flow, where the pack wants her to be Thylo's mate.

Jerboa gives birth to a baby werewolf, which crawls into her pouch. Donny informs Beckmeyer that his girlfriend is from Flow, and they are trying to find her. Jerboa smells Donny nearby and meets him at night. She shows him their baby boy and tells him about the impending danger; they flee to the hills. The following day, a government task force captures the werewolf pack. Beckmeyer convinces Olga to allow scientists to study her and Thylo. After Thylo is tortured with strobe lights to make him transform, Beckmeyer frees him and Olga. The trio escapes into the Outback and finds Kendi, Donny, Jerboa, and the baby.

Kendi summons the spirit of a phantom wolf, which massacres hunters pursuing the group. Kendi dies afterward, and the pack burns off his flesh, but the smoke alerts soldiers still in pursuit of the pack. Kendi's skeleton attacks the soldiers before being destroyed by a soldier's machine gun. Thylo summons the spirit at night and transforms into a giant wolf. He attacks the remaining soldiers before being killed by a bazooka blast that destroys the rest of the encampment. Olga and Beckmeyer fall in love and hide with Jerboa and Donny at an idyllic riverside camp. Eventually, Jerboa and Donny leave, assuming new identities; the Beckmeyers remain behind to raise their daughter and newborn son. Sharp locates Harry and informs him that all lycanthropes have been given amnesty due to the crimes committed against them. The Beckmeyers move back to the city.

While teaching a class in Los Angeles, Beckmeyer is approached by a young man who introduces himself as Zack, the son of Jerboa and Donny. Zack informs Beckmeyer that his parents live in L.A. under new identities: Jerboa is now the famous actress "Loretta Carson" and Donny is the famous director "Sully Spellingberg". That night, Olga and Beckmeyer watched Jerboa win the Best Actor award on a television show hosted by Dame Edna Everage. As Jerboa accepts the award, the flashing cameras and stage lights cause her to change into a werewolf. Olga also transforms, to her husband's dismay. Jerboa goes on the attack as her sisters howl in glee; Sharp laughs deviously in his living room as the camera zooms in on a framed photo of a thylacine that Sharp has hanging up.

== Cast ==
- Barry Otto as Professor Harry Beckmeyer
- Imogen Annesley as Jerboa
- Max Fairchild as Thylo
- Ralph Cotterill as Professor Sharp
- Leigh Biolos as Donny Martin
- Frank Thring as Jack Citron
- Michael Pate as President
- Barry Humphries as Dame Edna Everage
- Carole Skinner as Yara
- Brian Adams as General Miller
- Christopher Pate as Agent
- Dagmar Bláhová as Olga Gork
- Burnum Burnum as Kendi
- Steve Shaw as Horror Movie Actor
- Bob Barrett as Policeman
- Fred Welsh as Dan Ruggle
- John Ewing as General Forster
- Glenda Linscott as Bahloo
- Peter Baird as Omega soldier #1

== Production ==
Howling III is considered a standalone film in the Howling series. Though Philippe Mora directed Howling II: Your Sister Is a Werewolf, Howling III features no references or characters from the previous two films. The werewolves in Howling III are also portrayed more sympathetically.

Mora had been unhappy with Howling II's story and how the producers added extra footage, such as additional shots of breasts, after he left.

Mora wanted to make a third film himself to make amends and raised the money himself with co-producer Charles Waterstreet. Once Mora pitched his take to Howling rights holder Steven Lane, Lane agreed to assign the rights to an Australian company at Mora's suggestion. Mora got the idea for Howling III from the Tasmanian tiger and reframed the story as one that sides with the werewolves to subvert conventions of the sub-genre.

== Home media ==
The film was released directly to VHS in Australia by CBS/Fox Video.

Elite Entertainment first released the film on DVD in 2001. The out-of-print DVD contained a widescreen print of the film, trailers, and an audio commentary by the director. In 2007, Timeless Media Group released a pan and scan DVD and Blu-ray of the film with no bonus material.

Scream Factory released Howling III on Blu-ray in North America on 15 January 2019, with extra features, both new and vintage.

== Critical reception ==
Vincent Canby of The New York Times wrote: "If you only see one werewolf movie this year, you might as well make it Howling III, Philippe Mora's not-altogether straight-faced howler on behalf of lycanthropes' liberation". Variety noted that the film "will have a career on video, but should also please the buffs in theaters ... Mora knows his horror films, and has great fun sending them up". Leonard Klady of the Los Angeles Times called it "a campy recycling of familiar fangoria that is fitfully entertaining". Dave Kehr of the Chicago Tribune awarded 1 star out of 4 and wrote that the film "seems destined to languish in dusty obscurity on the higher shelves of less discriminating video stores. Director Philippe Mora, who also filmed the dismal Howling II, here gives up any attempt to create a serious horror film, allowing the project to slither quietly into the swamp of self-conscious camp". Richard Harrington of The Washington Post wrote: "Howling III is much better than the shoddy II but nowhere near as sharp as the Joe Dante original ... Mora's got some intriguing strands to weave together, but the film has no internal rhythm (though it has incessant and usually inadequate music pulsing under every scene). The changeovers are surprisingly mild in this age of great special-effects expectations. Perhaps it's because the director seems unsure how he really feels about werewolves".

The film holds a 23% approval rating with an average rating of 3.9/10 on the review aggregate website Rotten Tomatoes based on 13 reviews.
