= The Howling: Reborn =

- DVD cover
- Directed by: Joe Nimziki
- Screenplay by: Joe Nimziki; James Robert Johnston
- Based on: The Howling II by Gary Brandner
- Produced by: Joel Kastelberg; Ernst Etchie Stroh
- Starring: Lindsey Shaw; Landon Liboiron; Ivana Miličević; Niels Schneider; Kristian Hodko; Erin Agostino; Sean Mercado
- Cinematography: Benoit Beaulieu
- Edited by: James Coblentz
- Music by: Christopher Carmichael; Mark Anthony Yaeger
- Production company: Moonstone Entertainment
- Distributed by: Anchor Bay Films
- Release date: October 18, 2011
- Running time: 92 minutes
- Countries: Canada; United States
- Language: English

The Howling: Reborn is a 2011 teen horror film directed by Joe Nimziki and starring Lindsey Shaw, Landon Liboiron and Ivana Miličević. It is the eighth film and a reboot of The Howling film series. The film was released on DVD on October 18, 2011.

== Plot ==
Kathryn Kidman is attacked and apparently killed by a werewolf. 18 years later, Kathryn's son Will is living with his father Jack and is enrolled in a high school with an advanced security system. His best friend, Sachin, is making a horror film and is planning to broadcast it by illegally hacking into news channels. Will has a crush on Eliana Wynter, but her current boyfriend scares him away. Later, Eliana invites him to a party, where a creature attacks. Will escapes. He later asks Sachin about werewolf lore. Will cuts himself and the wound heals instantaneously, proving that he's a werewolf.

It is revealed that Kathryn, now known as Kay, is still alive, but has become a werewolf. Kay kills Jack, then goes to Will's school to explain Will's werewolf heritage to him. Confronted with this truth, Will saves Eliana from other members of Kay's wolf pack. The invasion sets off the security system and the school enters automated lockdown mode, cutting off the school from the outside world. Will remembers Sachin's advice that werewolves can only be killed by silver bullets or fire, so he and Eliana equip themselves with homemade flamethrowers.

Will and Eliana find Sachin just in time to see him killed by a werewolf. Sneaking off to the basement, they discover that Kay is raising an army of werewolves. Eliana tries to goad Will to turn her into a werewolf, but he manages to restrain himself. Kay captures Eliana to force Will to become a werewolf. Will fights Kay with weapons, but Kay is too powerful to be killed by silver bullets. Another werewolf attacks Kay and rips her heart out. The werewolf is Eliana, who was previously wounded by Will. Eliana and Will burn down the school to kill the other new werewolves.

Will creates a video in which he transforms on camera and warns the world about werewolves. It's circulated all over the world, and humans prepare to battle against the new threat.

== Cast ==
- Landon Liboiron as Will Kidman
- Lindsey Shaw as Eliana Wynter
- Ivana Miličević as Kathryn "Kay" Kidman
- Jesse Rath as Sachin
- Niels Schneider as Roland
- Frank Schorpion as Jack Kidman
- Kristian Hodko as "Tribe"
- Sean Mercado as Pierce
- Sacha Charles as Roddick
- Michael Stewart Grant as Stalker
- Erin Agostino as Regina
- Mark Camacho as Principal Larouche

== Production ==
In November 2009, it was announced producers Joel Kastelberg and Ernst Etchie Stroh would produce a reboot of The Howling under the title The Howling: Reborn. Former studio marketing executive Joe Nimziki was announced as director and writer of the film in his feature debut having gained experience as a script doctor. Steven Lane and Bob Pringle who had produced prior entries in the series executive produced the film. When Nimziki wrote the film with a strong focus on a love story the producers reacted with skepticism as they had desired something more traditional with a group of teenagers being killed off one-by-one, however once Twilight proved to be a sizable hit the producers changed their stance on Nimziki's love story focus.

An international co-production film between Canada and the United States. The story is credited as being based on the novel The Howling II by Gary Brandner; however, the film instead has minor elements from the first novel.

Production began on the film in Canada in May 2010. The film was released direct to video in late October 2011.

== Home media ==
Anchor Bay Entertainment released The Howling: Reborn on DVD and Blu-ray in the U.K. on 9 April 2012.

== Critical reception ==
The Howling: Reborn received negative reviews from critics. R.L. Shaffer from IGN DVD gave the film a 3/10: "Like the other sequels, The Howling: Reborn takes a great concept and completely flushes it down the toilet in order to exploit modern horror/werewolf trends". Felix Vasquez Jr. from Cinema Crazed gave it a rating of 2.5/4, calling it "a decent time killer with strong performances and a good head on its shoulder". Review aggregator Rotten Tomatoes gives the film a score of 17%, based on 6 reviews with an average score of 3.90/10.
