= Quintana Roo (disambiguation) =

Quintana Roo is a state of Mexico.

Quintana Roo may also refer to:

== Places ==
- Quintana Roo Municipality, Yucatán, or the head of the municipality

== People ==
- Andrés Quintana Roo (1787–1851), Mexican politician
- Quintana Roo Dunne, late daughter of writers John Gregory Dunne and Joan Didion

== Other ==
- Quintana Roo (company), a manufacturer of triathlon-specific bicycles and wetsuits
- Quintana Roo (novel), a 1984 horror novel by Gary Brandner
- Operation Quintana Roo
- Tales of the Quintana Roo, a collection of fantasy stories by American author Alice Sheldon (as James Tiptree Jr.)
