= Howling V: The Rebirth =

1989 film by Neal Sundstrom

- VHS cover
- Directed by: Neal Sundstrom
- Screenplay by: Freddie Rowe; Clive Turner
- Based on: novels by Gary Brandner
- Produced by: Gary Barber; Harvey Goldsmith; Steven A. Lane; Robert Pringle; Edward Simons; Clive Turner
- Starring: Philip Davis; Victoria Catlin; Elizabeth Shé; Ben Cole; Mark Sivertsen; Stephanie Faulkner; Mary Stävin
- Cinematography: Arledge Armenaki
- Edited by: Claudia Finkle; Bill Swenson
- Music by: The Factory
- Distributed by: International Video Entertainment
- Release date: February 22, 1990; (United States)
- Running time: 96 minutes
- Countries: United Kingdom; Hungary
- Language: English
- Budget: $2,000,000

Howling V: The Rebirth is a 1989 direct-to-video horror film directed by Neal Sundstrom from the screenplay by Freddie Rowe and Clive Turner, and filmed in Budapest, Hungary. Starring Philip Davis, Victoria Catlin, Elizabeth Shé, Ben Cole, and William Shockley, The Rebirth is the fifth entry in the series of eight stand-alone films with loose continuity.

== Plot ==
In Budapest, 1489, a family living in a castle is slaughtered by a couple who then commit suicide. However, as the man lies dying, he discovers a baby survived the ordeal.

In 1989, a mysterious Count invites a group of people to the same castle's reopening. The group comprises Gail Cameron, Marylou Summers, Jonathan Hammet, David Gillespie, Ray Price, actress Anna, the Professor, and Dr. Catherine Peake. Peter and Susan attend the castle. During lunchtime, Hammet relates to Marylou the story of the region, which, 1,000 years prior, was terrorized by packs of wolves supposedly controlled by Satan himself, disguised as a man during the day and as a wolf at night. According to the Professor, the castle was constructed around that time and then inexplicably abandoned. The Professor stumbles upon a dungeon while following some noises, just when something breaks its chains. He's then trapped inside and killed.

The following morning, the Count explains how the powerful family in charge of the castle was killed. He then expresses discomfort after the Professor is mentioned and abruptly leaves. He returns afterward to explain the Professor's disappearance. That night, Gail expresses to Ray her belief that something is amiss and that there's someone else in the castle. Unbelieving, Ray finds a secret passage, where he witnesses Gail attacked by a werewolf. He then finds an exit alongside the Professor's body, but is killed in the snow. Peter sabotages David's camera. The Count searches for Cameron and Ray and finds the secret passage and a maze of tunnels alongside Jack and David. Everyone decides to organize a search party. Jonathan and Marylou discover that someone tricked them into getting lost, Jonathan is killed, Peter is injured, and Marylou and Anna witness the werewolf attacking them.

Richard and Anna discover they all lack a family and begin to suspect they were lured there. David and Catherine find most of the bodies. Convinced that the Count is the killer, they attempt to alert the others, but they find Richard already dead. Pressured, the Count reveals all of them are descendants of the family who owned the castle and thus are werewolves, which can only be destroyed by another relative. He used the others as bait. He's then locked in the dungeon, alongside Peter and Susan. David and Catherine decide to kill them against Anna's wishes, so she releases them, getting herself locked in by them. She is supposed to be safe; however, she's killed by the werewolf when its human form approaches her.

David discovers Ray's body, while Catherine finds Anna's before being killed herself. Peter, after trying to kill David, accidentally kills Susan, who also tried to kill David, before being killed. Going outside, they find the Count, who fights David over the gun after advising Marylou that David is possessed and will transform into a werewolf when the moon appears. Marylou retrieves the weapon and uses it to kill the Count. Afterward, she and David embrace, and David tells Marylou there's no werewolf. However, Marylou smiles wickedly as the full moon rises, revealing herself as the werewolf.

== Cast ==
- Philip Davis as The Count
- Victoria Catlin as Dr. Catherine Peake
- Elizabeth Shé as Marylou Summers
- Ben Cole as David Gillespie
- William Shockley as Richard Hamilton
- Mark Sivertsen as Jonathan Lane
- Stephanie Faulkner as Gail Cameron
- Mary Stävin as Anna
- Clive Turner as Ray Price
- Nigel Triffitt as The Professor
- Jill Pearson as Eleanor
- József Madaras as Peter
- Renáta Szatler as Susan

== Production ==
An international co-production film between the United Kingdom and Hungary, the film was written by Clive Turner and Freddie Rowe with the script written to de-emphasize effects sequences in favor of the whodunit story and Gothic European atmosphere. Turner had previously written Howling IV: The Original Nightmare and would go on to write and direct Howling: New Moon Rising. Cedric Sundstrom was originally asked to direct the film by Turner. He was unable to accept, as he was busy making a different film The Revenger, but recommended his brother, Neal Sundstrom.

The film was shot in Budapest. Hungary, its setting. Much of the crew was Hungarian, and the original cinematographer was fired after the first day of filming because he spoke virtually no English. Arledge Armenaki took over the role, despite only having a limited grasp of English himself at the time, but was able to communicate adequately well with Sundstrom, allowing filming to proceed.

== Release ==
International Video Entertainment released the film direct to VHS in 1989 and released on DVD as a double feature with Howling VI: The Freaks in 2003 by Artisan Home Entertainment and in 2007 by Timeless Media Group. The film is now out of print and has not been re-released since.

== Reception ==
Howling V: The Rebirth is almost universally regarded as one of the best Howling sequels. The "whodunit" mystery theme was singled out for praise, as well as the film's atmosphere. Screen Rant ranked the film number 3 on its list of the best films in The Howling franchise, saying: "There's less werewolf action in this than most Howling movies, but the mystery plot keeps things interesting and the final scene has a fun reveal". WhatCulture ranked the film as number 2: "After three sequels ranging from sub-par to absolutely disastrous, Howling V: The Rebirth does the unthinkable and dares to be a really good, highly atmospheric horror tale", also claiming it to be "the shining jewel among the franchise's very questionable sequels".
