= Cameron's Closet =

1988 film by Armand Mastroianni

- Directed by: Armand Mastroianni
- Written by: Gary Brandner
- Produced by: George Zecevic; Luigi Cingolani
- Starring: Scott Curtis; Cotter Smith; Mel Harris; Tab Hunter; Kim Lankford; Leigh McCloskey; Chuck McCann; Gary Hudson; William Lustig (uncredited)
- Cinematography: Russell Carpenter
- Edited by: Frank De Palma
- Music by: Harry Manfredini
- Production company: Smart Egg Pictures
- Distributed by: SVS Films
- Release date: January 13, 1989
- Running time: 87 minutes
- Country: United States
- Language: English

Cameron's Closet, also known as Cameron's Terror, is a 1988 American supernatural horror film. The film was directed by Armand Mastroianni and stars Scott Curtis, Cotter Smith, Mel Harris, Tab Hunter, Kim Lankford, Gary Hudson and William Lustig.

== Plot ==
Cameron Lansing (Scott Curtis) is an introverted, solitary, 10-year-old boy with psychic abilities who lives with his father, Owen Lansing (Tab Hunter), a research scientist. Owen has subjected Cameron to intense psychological testing from a young age in an effort to unbury the hidden powers of the human mind. During a series of mysterious and bizarre circumstances in their rural house one night, Owen is decapitated by a machete, yet the authorities can find no evidence of foul play and rule it out as an accidental death believing he simply fell on it. Cameron goes to live with his mother Dory Lansing (Kim Lankford) and her obnoxious actor boyfriend Bob Froelich (Gary Hudson) in Los Angeles. Both Dory and Bob are unaware of Cameron's paranormal abilities.

Sergeant Sam Taliaferro (Cotter Smith) of the Homicide Division of the LAPD has sleeping trouble and a recurring nightmare which is affecting his work. Taliaferro's partner, Detective Pete Groom (Leigh McCloskey) complains about Taliaferro's frequent bouts of absent-mindedness in the line of duty caused by his lack of sleep, and so Taliaferro is ordered to go see a psychiatrist who works with the department, Dr. Nora Haley (Mel Harris). When Bob Froelich is horrifically murdered in Cameron's room, having been thrown out of the second-floor window with his eyes burnt out of the sockets, Sam Taliaferro, Pete Groom and Nora Haley are put on the case. As they investigate the perplexing case, Taliaferro befriends Cameron and realizes that deaths are occurring always around the boy, and that his nightmares seem to be linked to the boy. Under her counselling sessions Nora Haley also realizes that the boy has paranormal abilities, even being able to foresee future events. It also becomes apparent to Taliaferro that whatever Cameron concentrates on hard enough or focuses on is manifesting itself into reality.

Cameron plays an imaginative game with a figurine his father gave to him he calls the "Deceptor", actually an ancient figure of a Mayan demon said to be terrible beyond description in Owen Lansing's texts. Cameron's imagination makes the creature real and it takes up residence in Cameron's bedroom closet. Soon, numerous inexplicable and gruesome deaths are occurring around the closet in Cameron's room, and people who have already died seem to be mysteriously reappearing in an undead state. Bob Froelich is horrifyingly resurrected in Cameron's closet and murders Detective Pete Groom when he looks inside.

Taliaferro and Haley seek out Owen Lansing's assistant, Professor Ben Majors (Chuck McCann) at his home in the woods, where they learn the truth about Cameron. Taliaferro is stalked through the woods by Pete Groom's ghost, who warns him that the evil is "out of the closet now." The demons soon wish to destroy Cameron, thus severing their link to limbo and sealing them within reality and in our world. Majors kidnaps Cameron and takes him back to Cameron's house where Majors is then murdered by the demon, his blood boiling in his veins. Only Sam Taliaferro and Nora Haley are able to protect Cameron. Cameron goes back to his room to face the demon in the closet once and for all and destroy it before Cameron loses his powers to it.

== Cast ==
- Cotter Smith as Sam Talliaferro
- Mel Harris as Nora Haley
- Scott Curtis as Cameron
- Chuck McCann as Ben Majors
- Leigh McCloskey as Pete Groom
- Kim Lankford as Dory Lansing
- Gary Hudson as Bob Froelich
- Tab Hunter as Owen Lansing
- Dort Clark as Alan Wilson
- David Povall as Capt. Navarro
- Wilson Smith as Joe Crespy
- Frank Pesce as Ed Wallace

== Production ==
The screenplay of Cameron's Closet was written by Gary Brandner, who had previously written both the trilogy of novels and the film adaptations of the acclaimed The Howling. Brandner significantly rewrote the story when adapting it for film with the most notable difference being that in the novel Cameron was five years old and his older brother, Timothy, was their father's first choice for the experiments with Brandner merging the two into one character.

The special effects of Cameron's Closet were done by Carlo Rambaldi, who had previously designed the eponymous character in E.T. the Extra-Terrestrial (1982) and the mechanical-head effects for the creature in Alien (1979), for both of which had earned Rambaldi an Oscar. Rambaldi also worked on Profondo Rosso (Deep Red) (1975), King Kong (1976), Close Encounters of the Third Kind (1977), Dune (1984) and King Kong Lives (1986).

Cult horror film director William Lustig has a cameo in the film as a pornographic film director being booked by the police.

Production on the film took place between May and June 1987 in Los Angeles, California over a ten-week shooting schedule.

Cotter Smith and Mel Harris later married after meeting each other on set.

== Release ==
Cameron's Closet was initially intended to be released in October 1988, but its release was delayed. The film was given a limited theatrical release in the United States by Sony Video Software, Inc. (aka SVS Films) in February 1989 with a release in New York City on February 10 followed by Los Angeles release on February 24. This marked SVS Films' sophomore theatrical release following Tiger Warsaw. The film was released later that same year on VHS on May 25, 1989.

The film was released on DVD by Sony Pictures Home Entertainment in 2004.

== Reception ==
Critical reception for Cameron's Closet upon its release has been mixed. The Los Angeles Times gave Cameron's Closet a negative review, criticizing the special effects and stating that the movie "never should have come out of the closet". The reviewer for the Fort Worth Star-Telegram was more positive, favorably comparing it to Child's Play, which had come out the year prior. Stephen Hunter of The Baltimore Sun praised the performance of Mel Harris while also criticizing the script's subtexts, stating that it never delivered on these.
