= The Howling III: Echoes =

Novel by Gary Brandner

- First U.K. edition cover
- Author: Gary Brandner
- Cover artist: Peter Elson
- Language: English
- Series: The Howling
- Subject: Werewolves
- Genre: Horror novel
- Publisher: Fawcett (U.S. edition); Hamlyn (U.K. edition)
- Publication date: 1985
- Publication place: United States
- Media type: Print (paperback)
- Pages: 254
- ISBN: 0-09-940730-2
- OCLC: 59057562
- Preceded by: The Howling II

The Howling III: Echoes (U.S. title: The Howling III) is a 1985 horror novel by the American author Gary Brandner. It is the third and final entry in his Howling series of novels. Like its predecessor, The Howling II, the book has not been adapted for the screen and bears virtually no similarity to the Howling III film or any of the other films in The Howling series. Minor elements of the novel (such as werewolves being used in carnival freak shows) were used in the film Howling VI: The Freaks, though this idea was actually first seen in the 1975 British horror film Legend of the Werewolf.

== Plot ==
A year after the Californian mountain village of Drago was destroyed by a fire, sinister murders begin to occur in the neighboring town of Pinyon. A teenage boy named Malcolm, a survivor of the Drago fire, is found living in the woods. The former leader of the Drago community and the one responsible for the deaths, Derak, finds Malcolm and tries to tell him of his werewolf heritage and bring him back to his people; fellow survivors of Drago like themselves.

Malcolm is hospitalized and placed under the care of resident psychiatric specialist Dr. Holly Lang, who becomes his friend. However, an ambitious and unscrupulous doctor, Wayne Pastory, abducts Malcolm so that he can experiment on him and learn more about werewolves. At a secret clinic, Malcolm is tortured as Pastory conducts cruel experiments on him. Due to his young age, Malcolm is only partially able to transform into a werewolf. Holly discovers the whereabouts of the clinic and tries to rescue Malcolm, but she is attacked by Pastory's henchman. Just as he is about to rape her, Derak in werewolf form bursts in and kills the henchman. Malcolm is freed by Holly, who is subsequently rescued herself by the Pinyon sheriff, Gavin Ramsay. Malcolm runs away before they or Derak can take him back to Pinyon.

Over the course of the next year, Malcolm lives as a drifter, wandering throughout California. He eventually meets a man named Bateman Styles who works for a traveling carnival. Seeing that Malcolm has certain "abilities", Styles offers him a job working in the carnival freak show as "Grolo - The Animal Boy". Malcolm, without any money or a place to live, accepts and the show becomes a minor success. The increased publicity leads to Malcolm's picture being published in the press, which is seen by Holly, who travels to see him. She offers Malcolm the choice of returning to Pinyon with her, which Malcolm accepts. However, the publicity has also attracted the attention of Pastory, who has been dismissed from the Pinyon Hospital over his dubious activities, but is still keen to resume his experiments. He travels to the carnival and tries to make a deal with Styles, who refuses. Pastory tries to strangle Styles, who then has a heart attack and dies. Malcolm, who is hiding nearby, partially transforms and kills Pastory, but is surprised to find that Derak has also tracked him down and still wants him to join their people. In order to persuade him, Derak has kidnapped Holly. This prompts Ramsay to travel to the carnival to find her. He learns from a female Drago survivor named Lupe that Derak is holding Holly hostage in the mountains until Malcolm joins them. Ramsay makes Lupe take him to where they are hiding, though she begins to transform into a werewolf on the way; forcing Ramsay to shoot her with a silver bullet.

In Derak's mountain lair, Malcolm arrives and fights with him, then Derak reveals he is his father. The two change into werewolves, but end up killing each other just as Ramsay arrives and rescues Holly, while the other members of Derak's group head off into the forest, having lost their leader.

== Discontinuities from the previous novels ==
Although written by the same author, The Howling III: Echoes retroactively alters the times and events established in the first two books and features entirely new characters. The characters from the first two books are not even mentioned:

- At the end of the original 1977 novel, the village of Drago is burned down after one of the novel's characters throws a lit torch at a group of werewolves and it accidentally ignites the surrounding woodland, sweeping through the area and destroying the town. In The Howling III: Echoes, the fire is started deliberately by the people from the neighboring village of Pinyon, who want to rid the area of werewolves. They lock some of the Drago residents in a barn and purposely set fire to it, burning the town along with it.
- The first two novels are set in the late 1970s (the time they were written and published), as specified by cultural information given in them (such as the television shows that were on at the time). The Howling III: Echoes is clearly set in the mid-1980s, which contradicts the previously established time when Drago was burned down.
- The werewolves in the first two novels were described as looking like actual wolves, but the werewolves featured in The Howling III: Echoes are more anthropomorphic and stand seven feet tall while on their hind legs, like the werewolves from the 1981 film.
- The werewolves in the first two novels were only able to change on any night once the sun had gone down (both of the novels specifically mention this), whereas the werewolves in The Howling III: Echoes can change at any time of the day, like their film counterparts.
