= Steve Johnson (special effects artist) =

American special effects artist (born 1960)

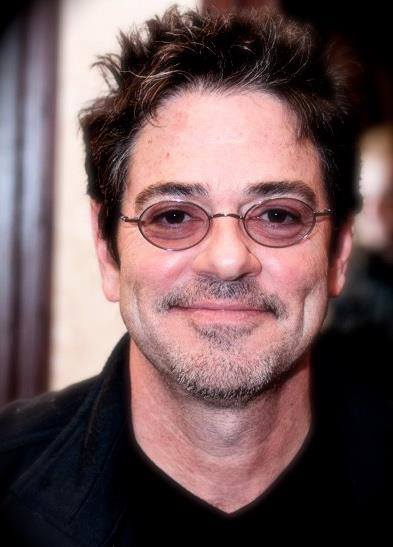
- Johnson at a convention in Texas, 2013
- Born: Houston, Texas, U.S.
- Years active: 1980–present
- Known for: Special effects
- Spouses: Linnea Quigley (m. 1990; div. 1992) Constance Zimmer (m. 1999; div. 2001)
- Website: www.stevejohnsonfx.com

Steve Johnson is an American special effects artist whose career has spanned more than thirty years. His work has appeared in over 200 films, countless television shows, theme parks, commercials, and music videos. Some of his best-known creations include Slimer for Ghostbusters (1984), the alien seductress Sil for Species (1995), Robin Williams's robotics for Bicentennial Man (1999), and Doctor Octopus's arms for Spider-Man 2 (2004).

== Early life ==
Johnson was born in Houston, Texas. As a child, Johnson watched Universal monster films and the Hammer films. These productions inspired him to become a special effects artist. Johnson's biggest influences are Jack Pierce, Dick Smith and Rick Baker. While he was still attending high school, Johnson met one of his idols, Rick Baker, and showed him his portfolio. Baker acknowledged Johnson's problem-solving talent and later helped him get a job working with effects creator Rob Bottin.

== Early career in film ==
Johnson's first job was with four-time Oscar-winner Greg Cannom on The Galactic Connection, though the film was not released. He then worked on The Howling (1981) and two other films with Rob Bottin, after which Rick Baker hired Johnson as a member of the special makeup effects crew for the John Landis blockbuster, An American Werewolf in London (1981). In 1982, Johnson worked on Ivan Reitman's new project, Ghostbusters, where he created "Slimer", which he based on John Belushi and the "librarian ghost". In 1982, he and visual effects artist Randall William Cook were brought in by Richard Edlund to create and run the special makeup effects studio at Boss Films, where they created characters for films like Poltergeist II (1986), Fright Night (1985), and Big Trouble in Little China (1986).

== XFX and Edge FX ==
Johnson started his own effects company in 1986 called "Steve Johnson's XFX." It was later renamed Edge FX. In 1989 Johnson worked on The Abyss, directed by James Cameron, which became one of the biggest blockbusters of the year. He created the "alien" creatures for the film's climax.

For the 1995 film Species, the filmmakers wished to create a half-human, half-alien character named Sil that was unlike any that had been seen on screen before. They brought in artist H.R. Giger to create the creature on paper, Richard Edlund for motion-capture visual effects (an art form that was still in early stages), and Johnson to design and create animatronics for the scenes that required Sil to be physical rather than digital. Sil's alien form had to have both a full-body animatronic version with replaceable arms, heads and torsos, as well as a rubber body suit that could be worn by actress Natasha Henstridge.

During the XFX and Edge FX years, Johnson also worked on two Stephen King mini-series: The Stand (1994) and The Shining (1997), for which he won Emmy Awards. In addition, his company did four seasons of the TV show Outer Limits, three seasons of Stargate SG-1, and ultimately opened a studio in Vancouver called Pacific Effects Group. He also created earth-shattering illusions for several seasons of magician Criss Angel’s A&E television show, Mindfreak. In 2003, Johnson wrote, produced, and directed a short called Everloving, which played as part of the Brooklyn Film Festival.

== Rubberhead ==
In 2017 Johnson published the first volume in his five volume series "Rubberhead," which chronicles his career in special effects. Volume 1 was critically acclaimed and features hundreds of photographs from Johnson's thirty plus year career. Volume 1 also features a foreword by acclaimed filmmaker John Landis.

== Innovations ==
For the film Innocent Blood (1992), Johnson innovated contact lenses that could glow and change color on command without digital after-effects. They were scleral lenses coated with silicone glass and Scotchlite, so that when lights, such as those from a color wheel were projected on them, the colors would bounce back toward the camera.

For Lord of Illusions (1995), horror master Clive Barker required Johnson to create an organic-looking creature with skin that could pulse, move, and morph without the use of stop motion photography or other techniques such as mold-casting that were industry standards at the time. Thus Johnson innovated a monster-making technique with Bill Bryan that employed plastic bags, old yogurt containers, colored methyl cellulose "slime", and used gravity and liquid as a propellant. This technique is one that he modified time and again, such as for making slimy tentacles out of plastic and goop for the embryonic pods in Species (1995).

== Personal life ==
Johnson was married to actress Linnea Quigley from 1990 to 1992, and to Constance Zimmer from 1999 to 2001. During Johnson's eight-year hiatus from the film industry, he spent a year living in the remote jungles of Costa Rica, as well as living in Austin, Louisiana, and the Smoky Mountains. During this time he wrote three books, and his effects were profiled in several other publications. Johnson's career in effects has been featured in books written by Anthony Timpone, Thomas Morawetz, and Rama Venkatasawmy. Johnson is also an instructor at the Stan Winston School of Character Arts. On May 1, 2015, the documentary, The Death of "Superman Lives": What Happened? directed by Jon Schnepp, about Tim Burton's canceled film Superman Lives was released. Johnson was featured in the documentary, as he was a principal special effects artist on the film working primarily on Superman's "light up" regeneration suit. In 2016, promoted a special effects book and biography called Rubberhead: Sex, Drugs and Special FX on Kickstarter.com. The first of a planned 5 volumes.

== Awards and nominations ==
- 1992, nominated – 19th annual Saturn Awards for "Best Make-Up" for Highway to Hell (1991) by the Academy of Science Fiction, Fantasy and Horror Films
- 1993, co-nominated – 20th annual Saturn Awards for "Best Make-Up" for Freaked (1993) by the Academy of Science Fiction, Fantasy and Horror Films
- 1994, won (shared) – Primetime Emmy Award for "Outstanding Individual Achievement in Makeup" for The Stand (1994)
- 1995, won (shared) – "Best Special Effects" for Species (1995) from Sitges - Catalan International Film Festival
- 1995, won – Universe Reader's Choice Award for "Best Make-up in a Genre Motion Picture" for Species (1995) from Sci-Fi Universe Magazine
- 1995, co-nominated – 22nd annual Saturn Awards for both "Best Make-Up" and for "Best Special Effects" for Species (1995) by the Academy of Science Fiction, Fantasy and Horror Films
- 1997, won (shared) – Primetime Emmy Award for "Outstanding Individual Achievement in Makeup" for The Shining (1997)
- 2003, won – Fangoria Chainsaw Award for "Best Makeup/Creature FX" for Blade II (2002)
- 2004, co-nominated – "Best Special Makeup Effects" by Hollywood Makeup Artist and Hair Stylist Guild Award for Dr. Seuss' The Cat in the Hat (2003)

== Partial filmography ==
Johnson has worked on the following films:

- The Fog (1980)
- Ghost Story (1981)
- Humanoids from the Deep (1980)
- Tanya's Island (1980)
- The Howling (1981)
- An American Werewolf in London (1981)
- Videodrome (1983)
- Ghostbusters (1984)
- Greystoke: The Legend of Tarzan, Lord of the Apes (1984)
- Biohazard (1985)
- Fright Night (1985)
- Howling II: Your Sister Is a Werewolf (1985)
- The Clan of the Cave Bear (1986)
- Big Trouble in Little China (1986)
- Poltergeist II: The Other Side (1986)
- Solarbabies (1986)
- Predator (1987) (uncredited special effects)
- Night of the Demons (1988)
- Dead Heat (1988)
- A Nightmare on Elm Street 4: The Dream Master (1988)
- Howling IV: The Original Nightmare (1988)
- Leviathan (1989)
- Monsters (TV Series, 1989–1991)
- The Abyss (1989)
- Night Angel (1990)
- A Grande Arte (1991)
- Howling VI: The Freaks (1991)
- Suburban Commando (1991)
- The Knife (1991)
- The Rapture (1991)
- Highway to Hell (1992)
- Pet Sematary II (1992)
- Innocent Blood (1992)
- H.P. Lovecraft's: Necronomicon (1993)
- The Temp (1993)
- Return of the Living Dead III (1993)
- Freaked (1993)
- Brainscan (1994)
- Next Door (1994)
- Oldest Living Confederate Widow Tells All (1994)
- Stephen King's The Stand (TV Mini-Series) (1994) (Emmy Award received)
- Night of the Demons 2 (1994)
- Dead Man (1995)
- The Surgeon (1995)
- Species (1995)
- Lord of Illusions (1995)
- Here Come the Munsters (TV Movie, 1995)
- The Outer Limits (TV series, 1995)
- Eraser (1996)
- Fatal Frames (1996)
- The Island of Dr. Moreau (1996)
- Bad Moon (1996)
- Poltergeist: The Legacy (1996–1999)
- Amistad (1997)
- Anaconda (1997)
- Buddy (1997)
- L.A. Confidential (1997)
- Nightwatch (1997)
- Stephen King's The Shining (1997) (Emmy Award received)
- Stargate SG-1 (TV series) (1997–2007) (seasons 1-3)
- First Wave (TV series) (1998–2001)
- Host (1998)
- Hulk (1998) (cancelled)
- Species II (1998)
- Sphere (1998)
- Superman Lives (1998) (cancelled)
- Wrongfully Accused (1998)
- Bicentennial Man (1999)
- Can of Worms (1999)
- Charmed (TV Series, 2 episodes, 1999)
- Election (film) (1999)
- Stephen King's Storm of the Century (1999)
- The General's Daughter (1999)
- Charlie's Angels (2000)
- Red Planet (2000)
- Along Came a Spider (2001)
- Arachnid (2001)
- Monkeybone (2001)
- Blade II (2002)
- Rose Red (miniseries) (2002)
- Star Trek: Nemesis (2002)
- Dreamcatcher (2003)
- The League of Extraordinary Gentlemen (2003)
- The Rundown (2003)
- The Cat in the Hat (2003)
- X2 (2003)
- Scooby Doo 2: Monsters Unleashed (2004)
- Spider-Man 2 (2004)
- The Village (2004)
- Constantine (2005)
- Fantastic Four (2005)
- Jarhead (2005)
- War of the Worlds (2005)
- Stay (2005)
- Unearthed (2006)
- I Am Legend (2007) (makeup test)
- Where the Wild Things Are (2009)
- Fear Clinic (2014)
- The Death of "Superman Lives": What Happened? (2015) (interviewed)
