= William Forsche =

American special effects artist

- Born: William Forsche; November 22, 1963 (age 61); Appleton, Wisconsin, U.S.
- Years active: 1984–present
- Known for: Special effects
- Website: forschedesign.com

William Forsche (born November 22, 1963) is an American special effects artist whose career has spanned more than thirty years. His work has appeared in many films, most of which are horror and science fiction projects, though he has occasionally created effects for other films, such as Beetlejuice (1988) and The Nutty Professor (1996).

== Early life ==
Forsche was born in Appleton, Wisconsin and from an early age showed a fascination with monsters. At just six years old he saw Universal's Frankenstein (1931) and was fascinated with the monster and its appearance, which led to his love of classic makeup effects artist Jack Pierce. After his chance encounter with the film he began using household items to create effects makeup, including his mother's makeup. He often used himself as a test subject while he created these homemade makeup effects. As a teenager he became involved in his junior high school's theater program, creating makeup and props for its productions.

At the age of 15 Forsche ran away from home, disguised with a false beard and only $15 in his pocket, and hitchhiked to Hollywood. He worked several odd jobs and slept in a playground tunnel that was located at a school for blind students until he could afford a motel room. Forsche obtained a job working as a tour guide for Universal Studios and became a friend of special effects artist David Miller, who had become famous for creating the Freddy Krueger makeup effects for the first A Nightmare on Elm Street film. Miller was asked to teach a makeup class and passed the job to Forsche, and this became his first makeup effects job in Hollywood.

== Career ==
Forsche worked on the popular horror film Friday the 13th Part VI: Jason Lives where he helped fabricate the hockey masks worn by Jason Voorhees. Forsche was then employed by Steve Johnson (special effects artist) for his company XFX for several films in 1988 including Dead Heat in which he did a life cast of Vincent Price, A Nightmare on Elm Street 4: The Dream Master where he applied the Freddy Krueger makeup effects to Robert Englund for several scenes and also to stuntman Rick Barker. Forsche also worked for XFX creating the werewolf effects for Howling IV: The Original Nightmare. He also portrayed the werewolf during the finale of the film.

Forsche is also known for his love of filming behind-the-scenes footage from the films he has contributed to, in order to illustrate both the process of creating effects and the making of the films themselves. His footage has been contributed to several websites, including Puppeteers of America and Spook Central: The Ghostbusters Companion. The last film that Forsche contributed effects for was the Platinum Dunes remake of A Nightmare on Elm Street (2010 film). Since then Forsche has created and sold life masks of famous actors and musicians as well as prop replicas and original artwork from his collection through his website. Forsche has created life masks since he was 15 years old and used this skill several times in his career, most notably in The Lost Boys and Ghostbusters II.

Forsche's incredible life masks have been recognized by artists and entertainment industry professionals alike. Artist Keith Edmier included 22 life masks that Forsche created for his 2015 show "Edison Impluvium." In 2016, Forsche provided specialty life masks to Universal Studios for their Hollywood Horror Nights attraction devoted to The Exorcist. That same year, he created life masks of David Bowie for museums and high-profile collectors.

In 2018, Forsche contributed a behind-the-scenes diary about his work on Howling IV: The Original Nightmare for the book The Complete History of The Howling. This diary also reveals the fact that most of the werewolf action that was shot didn't make the final cut of the film. Forsche also contributed several never before seen photos from A Nightmare on Elm Street 4: The Dream Master to the book Behind the Screams: The Dream Masters Revealed, which chronicles the making of the film and is co-authored by Mick Strawn and Blake Best.

Forsche co-authored an article on the process of taking life masks and their important historical and practical uses in film, and several of the life masks from his personal collection were featured. The article was published in the Spring 2020 issue of Prosthetics Magazine.

== Filmography ==
Forsche has worked on the following films:

- The Game (1984)
- Critters (1986)
- From Beyond (1986)
- Friday the 13th Part VI: Jason Lives (1986)
- A Time to Remember (1987)
- Dolls (1987)
- The Lost Boys (1987) (lifecasts)
- The Outing (1987)
- Return to Horror High (1987)
- A Nightmare on Elm Street 4: The Dream Master (1988)
- Beetlejuice (1988)
- Dead Heat (1988) (lifecasts)
- Howling IV: The Original Nightmare (1988) (makeup effects technician, also portrayed the werewolf at the end of the film)
- Mac and Me (1988) (sculptor)
- Night of the Demons (1988)
- Slaughterhouse Rock (1988)
- Spellcaster (1988)
- Dance of the Damned (1989)
- Ghostbusters II (1989) (lifecasts)
- Road House (1989) (appeared as an extra in the dancing scenes in the bar)
- The Terror Within (1989) (sculptor)
- Night Angel (1990)
- The Flash (1990 TV series) (sculptor)
- The Exorcist III (1990)
- A Kiss Before Dying (1991)
- Scanners II: The New Order (1991)
- Scanners III: The Takeover (1991)
- Buffy the Vampire Slayer (film) (1992)
- The Nutty Professor (1996)
- Jeepers Creepers (2001)
- Zoolander (2001)
- Modus Operandi (2009)
- A Nightmare on Elm Street (2010 film) (special effects technician)
- Men in Suits (2012)
- Crystal Lake Memories (2013)
- Death, Be Not Proud: 'A Wonderfull' Time (appears as himself) (2016)
- Death, Be Not Proud: All This Bleeding (appears as himself) (2016)
- Too Hot to Handle: Remembering Ghostbusters II (appears as himself) (2018)
