= Walkers (novel) =

Book by Gary Brandner

- First edition
- Author: Gary Brandner
- Language: English
- Subject: Zombies
- Genre: Horror fiction
- Publisher: Fawcett (1980 original issue)
- Publication date: 1980
- Publication place: United States
- Media type: Print (Paperback)
- Pages: 222 Pages (original Fawcett Gold Medal issue)
- ISBN: 0-449-14319-8 (1980 issue)
- Preceded by: The Howling II
- Followed by: Quintana Roo

Walkers (also known as Death Walkers) is a 1980 horror novel by Gary Brandner.

It was the basis for the 1989 television miniseries From the Dead of Night starring Lindsay Wagner, Bruce Boxleitner and Diahann Carroll, although the original novel was changed extensively for the TV film.

== Plot ==
After drowning in a swimming pool at a party, Joanna Raitt is resuscitated by boyfriend Glen. Afterward Joanna believes that her life is in constant danger and that she is being stalked. She begins to believe that forces are trying to bring her back into the world of the dead. Glen thinks she's crazy so Joanna turns to her ex-boyfriend and Psychic Counselor Peter Landau.

Joanna is nearly killed by a woman in a station-wagon and stalked by an unnaturally strong assassin. Peter reveals that her assailants are "walkers", the revived dead. The dead want her back, and Joanna must defeat four of the walking dead before she will be safe.
