= Hands That Bind =

2021 Canadian drama film

- Directed by: Kyle Armstrong
- Written by: Kyle Armstrong
- Produced by: Blake McWilliam
- Starring: Paul Sparks; Landon Liboiron; Nicholas Campbell; Susan Kent
- Cinematography: Mike McLaughlin
- Edited by: Marc Boucrot
- Music by: Jim O'Rourke
- Production company: Hired Hands Productions
- Distributed by: Mongrel Media; Dark Sky Films
- Release date: September 10, 2021 (CIFF)
- Running time: 116 minutes
- Country: Canada
- Language: English

Hands That Bind is a Canadian drama film, directed by Kyle Armstrong and released in 2021. The film stars Paul Sparks as Andy Hollis, a man who has been working as a farmhand for farmer Mac Longridge (Nicholas Campbell) with an eye to eventually taking over the farm when Mac retires, but whose plans are jeopardized when Mac's estranged son Dirk (Landon Liboiron), who had never wanted anything to do with the farm, returns and tries to get Andy fired.

The cast also includes Susan Kent as Andy's wife Susan and Bruce Dern as neighbour farmer Hank, as well as Will Oldham, Scott Olynek, Brendan Hunter, Geordie Cheeseman, John Warkentin, Robert Nogier, Ray Pearson, Linnea Mullen, Katrina Beatty, Cristina Menz, Brian Copping, Lianna Makuch and Ian Leung in supporting roles.

== Cast ==
- Paul Sparks as Andy Hollis
- Bruce Dern as Hank
- Nicholas Campbell as Mac Longridge
- Landon Liboiron as Dirk Longridge
- Susan Kent as Susan Hollis
- Will Oldham as The Barkeep
- John Warkentin as Stan
- Scott Olynek as Cody
- Brendan Hunter as The Vet
- Ray Pearson as John
- Geordie Cheeseman as Cowboy
- Liana Makuch as Hailey
- Katrina Beatty as Trina Longridge
- Robert Nogier as The Foreman
- Patrick Lundeen as Rick
- Cristina Menz
- Brian Copping as Dale
- William MacIean as Bob
- Ian Leung as The Banker
- Linnea Mullen as The Hitchhiker
- Sandra Nicholls as Mrs. Miller

== Distribution ==
The film premiered at the 2021 Calgary International Film Festival, before going into commercial release in 2023.

Its score, composed by Jim O'Rourke, was released as an album in 2023 shortly before the film's commercial release.

== Critical response ==
For Original Cin, Chris Knight wrote that "There are no ready answers, although the film leaves itself open to multiple interpretations. I can imagine an entire thesis built around it being a commentary on colonialism - in the opening scene, Andy finds an ancient arrowhead and then throws it away - but one could also watch the film without ever giving that reading a second thought. You could also lean into the way the movie offers several arguably dated suggestions for what it means to be a real man - provider, husband, father, worker, handyman and, in the case of Dirk, chauvinist. 'Hold my beer while I dance with your wife,' he instructs Andy in the town bar one night, before picking a fight with another guy and getting himself tossed out on his ass."

Anne T. Donahue of The Globe and Mail wrote that "cerebral and slow-burning, the film delves into the mythos surrounding what makes a man while tackling the binary of 'us' versus 'them.' Sparks’s understated albeit commanding turn as the strong, silent Andy works in tandem alongside Armstrong’s yellowed sceneries and desolate landscapes."

== Awards ==
Mike McLaughlin was nominated for Best Cinematography in a Theatrical Feature Film at the 2022 Canadian Society of Cinematographers awards, and was a Canadian Screen Award nominee for Best Cinematography at the 12th Canadian Screen Awards in 2024.

John Blerot won the Rosie Award for Best Overall Sound (Scripted Over 30 Minutes) in 2022, and was a CSA nominee for Best Sound Editing in 2024.
