= Behind the Screams =

Book by Mick Strawn and Blake Best

- Author: Mick Strawn, Blake Best

Behind the Screams: The Dream Masters Revealed is a book that chronicles the making of A Nightmare on Elm Street 4: The Dream Master written by Mick Strawn and author Blake Best.

== Publication ==
Mick Strawn, who was the production designer on A Nightmare on Elm Street 3: Dream Warriors and of A Nightmare on Elm Street 4: The Dream Master approached author Blake Best to co-write this book with him on December 13, 2017. The formal announcement of the book was delivered by Best and Strawn on December 14, 2017, and the book's production began on January 1, 2018. The book was released in August 2018 in order to coincide with the thirtieth anniversary of the film.

The book was conceived by Strawn and Best as a way of sharing previously untold stories about the making of the film. It began with stories from the makeup effects crews who had worked on the film but also included stories from production and the cast of the film, including Rachel Talalay, Robert Shaye, and Robert Englund.

William Forsche supplied previously unpublished photos for the book and also revealed a list of several other makeup effects artists who had also contributed to the book.

On August 24, 2018, the book was released at Creepycon Halloween and Horror Convention in Knoxville, TN.

== See also ==
- List of A Nightmare on Elm Street media
