= Howling IV: The Original Nightmare =

1988 British horror film

- DVD release cover
- Directed by: John Hough
- Screenplay by: Freddie Rowe; Clive Turner
- Story by: Clive Turner
- Based on: The Howling by Gary Brandner
- Produced by: Harry Alan Towers
- Starring: Romy Windsor; Michael T. Weiss; Antony Hamilton; Susanne Severeid; Lamya Derval
- Cinematography: Godfrey A. Godar
- Edited by: Malcolm Burns-Errington; Claudia Finkle
- Music by: David George; Barrie Guard; Justin Hayward
- Production company: Allied Vision
- Distributed by: International Video Entertainment
- Release date: July 3, 1988
- Running time: 94 minutes
- Country: United Kingdom
- Language: English

Howling IV: The Original Nightmare is a 1988 British direct-to-video horror film directed by John Hough from a screenplay by Freddie Rowe and Clive Turner. Starring Romy Windsor, Michael T. Weiss, Antony Hamilton, Susanne Severeid and Lamya Derval, The Original Nightmare is the fourth entry in the series of seven standalone films with loose continuity and is not so much a sequel but rather a more faithful adaptation of Gary Brandner's source novel The Howling (1977).

International Video Entertainment (IVE) released this film directly to home video in 1988. Platinum Disc Corporation (now Echo Bridge Home Entertainment) released it on DVD in 2004 and it has been released numerous times since. It was filmed on location in South Africa.

== Plot ==
After experiencing visions of a nun, author Marie Adams is in the middle of a meeting with her agent, Tom Billings, when she has another vision of a wolf-like creature lunging from a fire, and begins to scream hysterically. Marie's husband, Richard, discusses her condition with her physician Dr. Coombes, agreeing that Marie's overactive imagination leads her into dangerous territory. Dr. Coombes advises Richard to take Marie away from the pressures of her life for a few weeks. Richard locates a cottage in the small town of Drago, some hours from Los Angeles. Tom drives Marie there, but then departs quickly in the face of Richard. Marie looks around the cottage and declares it to be perfect, but that night, while she and Richard are making love, Marie is disturbed by howling out in the woods.

The next day, Marie and Richard look around Drago, where they meet the mysterious Eleanor, a local artist who owns a shop of antiques and knick-knacks, and the Ormsteads, who run the local store. Marie takes her dog for a walk and becomes distressed when he runs off. That night, Marie dreams of wolves, of herself running through the woods, and of the same nun of whom she had visions. Richard drives into L.A. for a meeting, and Marie spends time chatting with Mrs. Ormstead, who tells her about the previous couple to occupy the cottage and that they left town without a word. Marie is walking home through the woods when she suddenly sees the nun from her visions before her. She runs after her, but it turns out to be Eleanor in a dark cape. Eleanor points out a shortcut to the cottage, which Marie takes. She discovers a cave on the way, and what is left of her dog.

In horror, Marie runs through the woods, suddenly aware she is being pursued. Richard quiets his hysterical wife at the cottage and checks outside, but sees nothing, not even the dark figure nearby. The next morning, Marie witnesses a strange apparition: an elderly man and woman who appear in her living room and warn her to leave. Marie is momentarily distracted by a car pulling up outside, and the next instant her ghostly visitors are gone. The newcomer is Janice Hatch, who is holidaying in the area and enjoys Marie's writing. Marie invites her in and, as they are talking, mentions the howling that she hears at night.

After some hesitation, Janice reveals that she used to be a nun, and that her closest friend, Sister Ruth, disappeared over a year ago, only to be found in Drago speaking incoherently of the devil, a bell, and the sound of howling. After a long illness, Ruth died without ever being able to explain what happened to her, and Janice, determined to discover the truth, left the convent. Marie is disturbed by the mention of a nun, and becomes even more so when Janice shows her a photograph of Sister Ruth: it is the nun from her visions. Meanwhile, Richard, becoming frustrated with Marie's instability and visions, becomes drawn to Eleanor and sleeps with her.

Marie eventually learns that all the village inhabitants are werewolves and Sister Ruth babbled "Werewolves in here", rather than "We're all in fear", as everyone had assumed. When she tells Richard what she has learned, he angrily dismisses her claims and walks into the woods by their house. As he walks, he sees Eleanor seemingly waiting for him, and the pair become intimate. Eleanor transforms into a werewolf and bites Richard before running off. He stumbles back to the house and tells Marie he saw the werewolf, but that night, after being examined by the town doctor, he claims he just fell down a gully. Richard begins acting strangely, and the next night, as he is walking in the woods, he transforms into a werewolf as the villagers, who are also revealed to be werewolves, look on and then attempt to attack Marie.

Marie escapes and, following the storyline of the original folk tale, she lures the inhabitants to the local church using its bell and then burns them all alive, including Richard. The film ends with a burning werewolf lunging out of the fire at Marie just as she had foreseen in her vision.

== Cast ==
- Romy Windsor as Marie Adams
- Michael T. Weiss as Richard Adams
- Antony Hamilton as Tom Billings
- Susanne Severeid as Janice Hatch
- Lamya Derval as Eleanor
- Norman Anstey as Sheriff
- Kate Edwards as Mrs. Ormstead
- Dennis Folbigge as Dr. Coombes
- Anthony James as Father Camefrom
- Dale Cutts as Dr. Heinemann
- Clive Turner as Tow Truck Driver
- Megan Kruskal as Sister Ruth
- Denis Smith as Mr. Ormstead
- William Forsche as Werewolf

== Production ==
Harry Alan Towers had approached Howling series producer Steven Lane about a production deal in Africa as part of a tax shelter as many films were doing at the time. When the crew arrived in Africa, Towers had disappeared, much of what Towers had promised was not provided, and instead of a neighboring country, the crew was blindsided with the revelation that shooting would take place in South Africa. Additional problems arose due to director John Hough as according to both Lane and effects artist Steve Johnson, Hough often had no idea how to effectively capture the effects work or pace the film in an effective manner. Production began in November 1987 and principal photography was completed in January 1988.

== Music ==
The film's theme song "Something Evil, Something Dangerous" was performed by Justin Hayward, lead singer of The Moody Blues which Variety called the film's "classiest element".

== Reception ==
Variety gave the film a negative review, criticising the post-synced dialogue, pacing and the effects. The review took particular issue with the effect sequence in which Michael T. Weiss' character Richard Adams melts into a werewolf, saying the effects were "right out of The Devil's Rain and literally brings the film to a halt and is inappropriate". In Horror Films of the 1980s, author John Kenneth Muir rated it 1.5/4 stars. Scott Aaron Stine wrote in The Gorehound's Guide to Splatter Films of the 1980s that the film is "completely generic" and a rehash of the original. Mike Mayo, who wrote The Horror Show Guide: The Ultimate Frightfest of Movies, called it unsuspenseful and said the film's only connection to the series is its title. Craig J. Clark of The A.V. Club wrote the script, low budget, and poor special effects prevent the film from becoming suspenseful.

Despite the poor reviews, Howling IV: The Original Nightmare sold well enough on home video that it was deemed viable for further sequels.

== Sequels ==
Co-writer Clive Turner appears in the film as a tow truck driver. Turner also worked on the subsequent Howling V: The Rebirth, Howling VI: The Freaks and wrote and directed the seventh film in the Howling series, The Howling: New Moon Rising.
