= Pterodactyl Woman from Beverly Hills =

- Directed by: Philippe Mora
- Written by: Philippe Mora
- Produced by: Bruce Critchley
- Starring: Beverly D'Angelo; Aron Eisenberg; Barry Humphries; Brion James
- Cinematography: Walter Bal
- Edited by: Ross Guidici
- Music by: Roy Hay
- Production company: Troma Entertainment
- Distributed by: Troma Team Video
- Release date: January 24, 1996
- Running time: 97 minutes
- Country: United States
- Language: English

Pterodactyl Woman from Beverly Hills, made by Ptereo Pictures Inc. and Troma Entertainment in 1995, is a live-action farcical horror film, written and directed by Philippe Mora. The film stars Beverly D'Angelo, Aron Eisenberg and Brion James. Australian entertainer Barry Humphries has a cameo, playing three parts in the same scene: a grocery store clerk, the store manager and a "lady shopper" who is clearly his stage character Dame Edna Everage. The film had a limited cinematic release in January 1996 and was released on video by Troma in 1997.

== Plot ==
Paleontologist Dick Chandler (Brad Wilson) discovers a dinosaur egg, prompting an eccentric witchdoctor named Salvador Dalí (Brion James) to put a curse on Chandler's wife, Pixie (Beverly D'Angelo), causing her to slowly and intermittently transform into a pterodactyl. After Pixie lays an egg, Dick tracks down Salvador Dalí and apologizes, and the curse is lifted.

== Cast ==
- Beverly D'Angelo as Pixie Chandler
- Aron Eisenberg as Tommy Chandler
- Barry Humphries as Bert / Lady Shopper / Manager
- Brion James as Salvador Dalí / Sam
- Sharon Martin as Jenny Chandler
- Stephen McHattie as Dr. Egbert Drum
- Ruta Lee as Mrs. Poole
- Aleks Shaklin as Dr. Zavenbrot
- Ron Soble as Pablo Picasso
- Eddie Wilde as Janensch
- Brad Wilson as Dick Chandler
- Moon Zappa as Susie
- Carmine Zozzora as Dr. Harold Harold
- Jonathan Ball as Officer Othello
- Cabiria Cardinale as Karen / Mrs. Goldberg
- Holley Chant as Mrs. Hoffman
- Francesca Hilton as Helene

== Music ==
The film's music was composed by Roy Hay, the guitarist/keyboardist of British band Culture Club.

== Critical reception ==
Critics panned Pterodactyl Woman from Beverly Hills for being dull and unfunny. Variety magazine's review declared "all the actors ... are defeated by the drab material". The film was also criticized for being a "classic case of a title in search of a movie", unable to decide whether it seeks to spoof Los Angeles lifestyles or the science fiction genre.

Entertainment Weekly gave the film a C− and noted that "silly isn’t necessarily funny, and after an hour and a half of Bev’s squawking and stooping, you may find yourself wishing this species of movie were extinct."

The Dinosaur Filmography book describes the film as "a wildly uneven hodgepodge of sight gags, satire, and silliness, with just enough cleverness and intelligence to avoid laying an egg."
