= Howling II: Your Sister Is a Werewolf =

1985 American horror film by Philippe Mora

Howling II: Your Sister is a Werewolf
- Theatrical release poster
- Directed by: Philippe Mora
- Screenplay by: Robert Sarno; Gary Brandner
- Based on: The Howling II by Gary Brandner
- Produced by: Steven A. Lane
- Starring: Christopher Lee; Annie McEnroe; Reb Brown; Marsha Hunt; Sybil Danning
- Cinematography: Geoffrey Stephenson
- Edited by: Charles Bornstein
- Music by: Stephen W. Parsons
- Production companies: Hemdale Film Corporation; Granite Productions
- Distributed by: Hemdale Film Corporation
- Release dates: August 28, 1985 (France); December 25, 1985 (Detroit); July 4, 1986 (United States)
- Running time: 87 minutes
- Country: United States
- Language: English
- Budget: $2 million

Howling II: Your Sister Is a Werewolf (also known as Howling II and Howling II: Stirba – Werewolf Bitch) is a 1985 American horror film directed by Philippe Mora and direct sequel to the 1981 film The Howling. The film stars horror film veteran Christopher Lee, Reb Brown, Annie McEnroe and Sybil Danning and focuses on a group of people trying to stop werewolf queen Stirba and her group's plans to conquer the world. Although Gary Brandner, author of The Howling novels, co-wrote the screenplay, the Howling II: Your Sister Is a Werewolf is largely unrelated to his 1979 novel The Howling II.

== Plot ==
Ben White attends the funeral of his sister, journalist Karen White, the heroine of the previous film. Following her burial in the chapel's mausoleum, Ben meets both Jenny Templeton, one of Karen's colleagues, and Stefan Crosscoe, a mysterious interloper who tells him Karen was a werewolf. Providing evidence of the transformation—and turning up to destroy Karen as her undead body rises from the grave—Crosscoe convinces Ben and Jenny to accompany him to Transylvania to battle Stirba, an immortal werewolf queen. Along the way, the trio encounters Mariana, another lusty werewolf siren, and her minion, Erle.

Arriving in the Balkans, Ben and company wander through an ethnic folk festival, unaware that Stirba is off in her nearby castle and is already plotting their downfall. Stefan introduces Ben and Jenny to several locals who are sworn to oppose Stirba due to the deaths of their various family members, all of whom were killed either by Stirba or her followers. One night, Ben and Vasile find Stirba's castle nearby but are forced to flee after being spotted, and Vasile is killed in the escape. Stirba later uses Vasile's reanimated corpse to lure Stefan into a trap, but Ben saves Stefan at the last minute. During this, Jenny is captured and taken to Stirba's castle.

Ben and Stefan, along with villagers Konstantin, Luca and Father Florin assault the castle but are ambushed by Stirba's werewolves; Konstantin and Luca are killed in the battle, and Father Florin is injured. Arriving at the castle, the three split up to locate Jenny and kill Stirba. Ben rescues Jenny, killing Mariana, and flees the castle while Stefan and Father Florin confront Stirba. Stirba's demon kills Florin, but Stefan manages to kill Stirba, who burns to death with her.

Sometime later, Ben and Jenny return to the United States and live as a couple. A trick-or-treater knocks on their door, and they are confronted by what appears to be a child in a werewolf costume. After the child enters the apartment next door, they knock on the door and are met by a Romanian man who claims he has no children and lives alone. Declining his offer to come in for a drink, Ben and Jenny return to their apartment.

== Cast ==
- Christopher Lee as Stefan Crosscoe
- Annie McEnroe as Jenny Templeton
- Reb Brown as Ben White
- Marsha Hunt as Mariana
- Sybil Danning as Stirba Crosscoe
- Valerie Kaplanová as Old Stirba Crosscoe
- Judd Omen as Vlad
- Jiří Krytinář as Vasile
- Petr Skarke as Konstantin
- Igor Smrzik as Luca
- Ferdy Mayne as Erle
- Jimmy Nail as Dom
- Patrick Field as Deacon
- Ladislav Krečmer as Father Florin
- Ivo Niederle as Grigorie
- Jan Kraus as Tonda

== Production ==
While the first The Howling was a financial hit, producer Steven Lane never saw any of the profits due to the poor financial standing at Avco Embassy Pictures which offset several unrelated costs towards The Howling and consuming much of the film's revenue in the process. As Lane had bought out co-producer Jack Crawford prior to the first film's release, he possessed the sequel rights but couldn't make a direct-sequel to the original film as those rights belonged to Avco Embassy. As Lane was determined to turn a profit from his participation in The Howling, he entered into a deal with Hemdale Film Corporation. Philippe Mora became involved as he directed A Breed Apart for Hemdale and had not yet been paid with Hemdale arranging a deal that if he directed Howling II he'd be paid for both films. Both pre-production and production were subject to numerous stops and location changes as Hemdale had misrepresented their financial standing to Lane in their agreement. Gary Brandner rewrote the script multiple times to account for the numerous times the production was forced to change locations. The film's effects artist, Steve Johnson, who would return to provide work for additional installments in the series, stated that Hemdale's financial situation was also responsible for the poor quality of the special effects, as many of them were added in post several months after filming had wrapped.

This film is the only Howling sequel that directly follows the original film's events and is also the only Howling film to feature the input of the original novelist, Gary Brandner. Brandner was critical of the original 1981 film, which was only a loose adaptation of his 1977 novel, and some elements of this sequel may have been deliberately divergent from the previous film, though some (such as this film's retconning of the worldwide revelation of the existence of werewolves) seem to be accidental.

Director Philippe Mora said during that he originally chose to repeat the shot with Danning revealing her bare breasts 5 times during the end credits "because I thought it was funny. Unbeknownst to me, the producer saw it and thought it was the greatest thing he'd ever seen. He said to the editor, 'Reprint that!'" The final print repeats the shot 17 times during the end credits. For most other scenes in the movie, Danning was either covered with hair or wearing a metallic armoured outfit and sunglasses.

Some scenes were shot in Los Angeles, but most of the film was shot on locations in what was, at the time, the country of Czechoslovakia—for example, in the ossuary in Mělník, a town in Central Bohemia, as well as at Barrandov Studios, Prague. Shooting in communist Prague offered difficulties: Mora's government-assigned assistant director knew nothing of filmmaking. According to author Michael Adams, Mora had to "literally import trash from America to clutter the clean communist streets". When a local casting call went out looking for "punks", 1,000 people arrived, resulting in the local authorities calling in both the police and military. An army colonel advised Mora, "you can finish shooting the scene, but they'll have to leave in groups of no more than three".

Co-stars Marsha Hunt and Christopher Lee previously appeared together in Dracula A.D. 1972. In 1990, when Lee was cast in Gremlins 2: The New Batch, one of the first things he did was apologize to director Joe Dante (who directed The Howling) for being in this film. Lee had also played the antagonist in Captain America II: Death Too Soon (1979), which starred Reb Brown in the title role.

== Release ==
Original theatrical release poster

Hemdale Films had an original theatrical release in France on August 28, 1985, before its release in Detroit, Michigan, on Christmas Day 1985. Among its international release titles, it is known as Aullidos 2: Stirba, la mujer lobo or Aullidos 2 in Spain, Aullido 2 in Mexico, Üvöltés 2 – A nővéred egy vérfarkas in Hungary, Howling II – L'ululato in Italy, Hurlements II in France, Das Tier II in Germany, I gynaika lykanthropos (Greek script: Η γυναίκα λυκάνθρωπος) in Greece, and Vampiros em Fúria in Portugal. In its later U.S. release, the film was marketed with the tagline "The rocking, shocking new wave of horror!"

=== Alternative versions ===
The original theatrical release version of Howling II: Stirba – Werewolf Bitch ran at 87 minutes. This version was released on VHS from HBO / Cannon Home Video and Home Video. The re-edited TV version ran at 91 minutes. It included a new scene before the end credits, plus a brand-new end credits sequence to replace the original version's topless shots of Sybil Danning. The TV end credits include music, whereas the theatrical version is silent.

The film failed to garner as much attention or commercial success as the original. In later years, Howling II acquired a cult following.

=== Critical response ===
Roger Ebert spoke about Sybil Danning's work in the film and wrote that although it was close, it was "not the worst movie Danning has made." In noting the film's heroes becoming involved in the inept and "strange rituals of the cult of Stirba," he concedes that "no one presides over a ritual quite as well as Sybil Danning." The scene where she rips open her dress is repeated twice during the closing credits, "providing the movie with its second and third interesting moments".

Variety offered that, while Christopher Lee brought experience to his role as vampire hunter Stefan Crosscoe, the film lacks suspense, and the plot is generic and predictable. They noted that production did not take full advantage of the setting despite the film being shot primarily in Czechoslovakia. Bob Campbell of the Arizona Daily Star wrote: "A bad sequel to a B-movie shocker doesn't count as an artistic betrayal, but Howling II is about as bad as movies ever get".

Brian J. Dillard of Allrovi called it a "laughable exercise in horror-sequel tomfoolery," which "strays into so-bad-it's-good camp appeal." He noted that the sex appeal of Sybil Danning and the work of veteran horror stars Christopher Lee and Ferdy Mayne were used as substitutes for "the wit and inventive effects work that characterized the original." In noting the script's overuse of horror genre clichés, he was able to praise Danning's work for its keeping the film from being too serious. He concluded by writing, "later Howling sequels would drift into a more polished form of banality, but for utter what-were-they-thinking ineptitude, it's hard to beat this wretched howler".

Howling II: Your Sister is a Werewolf holds a 33% rating on Rotten Tomatoes based on 15 reviews.

== Home media ==
MGM Home Entertainment had a commercial re-release of the DVD for Your Sister Is a Werewolf in 2005, and released it again in 2010 as part of a two-disc set which included both 1985's Your Sister Is a Werewolf and 1981's The Howling.

Howling II was released on Blu-ray by Scream Factory on July 14, 2015.
