= Burning Down the House (film) =

2001 film by Philippe Mora

- Directed by: Philippe Mora
- Written by: Michael Cole Dinelli
- Based on: High Tension in the Tropics by Michael Cole Dinelli
- Produced by: Joanne Baron; James Wilder; John Savage; Elise Pritcher
- Starring: John Savage
- Cinematography: Dan Gillham
- Edited by: Robyn T. Luers
- Music by: Jeff Marsh
- Release date: February 7, 2001
- Running time: 88 minutes
- Country: United States
- Language: English

Burning Down the House is a 2001 film directed by Philippe Mora. It was written by Michael Cole Dinelli, who adapted it from his play High Tension in the Tropics. It was shot in 1998 and released direct-to-video in the United States.

== Plot ==
Unable to find funding for his next film, a Hollywood director burns down his house for the insurance money.

== Cast ==
- John Savage as Jake Seiling
- James Wilder as Arnie Green
- Joanne Baron as Brenda Goodman
- Ceasar Cavaricci as Ray
- William Atherton as Arthur Kranston
- Mick Fleetwood as The Bartender
- C. Thomas Howell as The Concierge
- René Auberjonois as Pierre
- David Keith as Carolina
- Arye Gross as Bob Washington
- Orson Bean as Sy

== Reception ==
Robert Koehler of Variety wrote that Mora and the cast "appear clueless from first frame to last".
