= Quintana Roo (novel) =

1984 novel by Gary Brandner

Quintana Roo (a.k.a. Tribe of the Dead)
- First edition
- Author: Gary Brandner
- Language: English
- Subject: Zombies, Jungle Adventure
- Genre: Horror novel
- Publisher: Fawcett (1984 original issue)
- Publication date: 1984
- Publication place: United States
- Media type: Print (Hardback & Paperback)
- Pages: 251 Pages
- ISBN: 978-0-449-12385-0 (1984 issue)
- Preceded by: Walkers
- Followed by: The Brain Eaters

Quintana Roo is a 1984 horror novel by Gary Brandner, first published by Fawcett. The novel is set in the Quintana Roo region of Mexico during the Second World War.
