= Philippe Mora =

Australian artist and film director (born 1949)

Phillipe Mora
- Born: 1949 (age 76–77); Paris, France
- Occupations: Artist; film director
- Works: Communion (1989)

Philippe Mora (born 1949) is a French-born Australian artist and film director.

== Origin ==
Mora was born in Paris, France, in 1949 to a Lithuanian-Jewish mother and a German-Jewish father. He is the eldest son of artist Mirka Mora and her husband, restaurateur and gallery owner Georges Mora, a French Resistance fighter during World War II. After a brief stint in New York, the family emigrated to Australia in July 1951 when Philippe was two, settling in Melbourne, where the Moras founded the Melbourne eateries Mirka Café and Café Balzac. Two younger brothers were born in Australia: William Mora (b. 1953, an art dealer) and Tiriel Mora (b. 1958, an actor). In 1965, his parents opened the Tolarno Restaurant and Galleries in St Kilda.

Mora began making films with an 8mm camera his father gave him while he was still a child, and won art prizes as a teenager.

== Career ==
A self-confessed movie addict from childhood, Mora's cinema icons were the Marx Brothers, Jean Cocteau's surrealist films, Alfred Hitchcock, Buster Keaton (as director) and Ernst Lubitsch's early films, as reflected in his first home movies. Back Alley, now preserved at the National Film & Sound Archive, was made in 1964 when he was 15. This was a parody of West Side Story filmed in Flinders Lane, Melbourne just behind his mother's studio in Grosvenor Chambers at 9 Collins Street. The film features Mora, his brother William, and friends Peter Beilby and Sweeney Reed, son of Joy Hester. His next film, Dreams in a Grey Afternoon (1965) was made as a silent movie but was screened with music by artist Asher Bilu. Shot on 8 mm and printed on 16 mm, the film features stop-motion animation of sculptures by the Russian-Australian sculptor and painter Danila Vassilieff, and includes rare footage of Sunday and John Reed.

Mora's next project, Man in a Film (1966), was a pastiche of Federico Fellini's 8½ and was also influenced by his recent viewing of The Beatles' A Hard Day's Night. Like its predecessor, it was made as a silent film, shot on 8mm and blown up to 16mm, and again screened with music by Asher Bilu. Man in a Film starred Sweeney Reed and premiered at the Tolarno Galleries in early 1967.

Give It Up (1967), shot in Fitzroy Street, Melbourne, again featured Reed, with Don Watson and Philippe's younger brother Tiriel. The film symbolised Australian response to the Vietnam War by depicting a woman (played by Zara Bowman) being repeatedly kicked and beaten in the gutter of a busy street while onlookers do nothing.

=== Exhibitions ===
In late 1967, when he had finished school, Mora travelled to England. He was invited, with his partner Freya Matthews, by Australian artist Martin Sharp into "The Pheasantry", a historic building in King's Road, Chelsea, London which housed studios and a nightclub. This residence inspired the name of his production company, Pheasantry Films. As "Von Mora", during this time he contributed cartoons influenced by Dada, comic strip art, Francis Bacon, and Vincent Van Gogh to Oz magazine and assisted co-editor Martin Sharp with its landmark "Magic Theatre" edition. In 2007, along with others associated with Oz including Germaine Greer, he was critical of the sensationalist depiction of the era in the movie Hippie Hippie Shake, but recalled in 2008 that; "most of my creative roots are in London. This is where I took off, crashed and burned and took off again. Paraphrasing Brendan Behan, on occasion, like many artists, I was a drinker with a painting problem." He also made his next short film, Passion Play, shot in the Pheasantry ca. 1967-1968 and featuring Jenny Kee as Mary Magdalene, Michael Ramsden as Jesus, and Mora himself as the Devil.

Mora began painting as soon as he arrived in London, and his first London exhibitions "Anti-Social Realism" and "Vomart," were held, at her invitation, in 1968 and 1969 at the King's Road gallery of Clytie Jessop, and garnered excellent reviews., though the first, in the Daily Mail, announcing that he used a special paint formula that kills flies, was evidently a satire written by the artist. Clytie Jessop was the sister of Hermia Boyd (Hermia Lloyd-Jones), who had married noted ceramicist David Boyd and elsewhere Clytie was a well-known actress and director who played the sinister Miss Jessell in Jack Clayton's classic supernatural thriller The Innocents (1961), and later directed the film Emma's War (1988) starring Lee Remick and a young Miranda Otto.

Mora also held a show at the Sigi Krauss Gallery, where Martin Sharp also exhibited, featuring pictures painted in black and white. The show also included a grey male rat, which he had bought from Harrods. When the rat turned out to be female and gave birth, he tried unsuccessfully to sell the babies as 'multiples' in a limited edition of eight. The rat show attracted the interest of German avant-garde artist Klaus Stacks, who commissioned Mora to produce an edition of a hundred screen prints of the mother rat. In February 1971, Joseph Beuys and Erwin Heerich invited him to sign a "Call to Action" manifesto demanding the freeing of the German art market.

His next show was in 1970 at the Sigi Krauss Gallery featuring a life-size sculpture of a sitting man, Pork Chop Ballad, a metaphor for the war in Vietnam. Mora's provocative and highly symbolic offal exhibit caused a stir. A brick was thrown through the gallery window, which led to it being featured on the cover of Time Out. Later, as the piece began to putrify, the police were called after Princess Margaret, dining at the restaurant across the street, complained about the stench. Detectives from Scotland Yard descended on the gallery and demanded that the sculpture be removed, but gallery owner Krauss refused. The police claimed it was a health hazard and forced him to move it into the garden, where it gradually rotted away. At later Krauss group exhibition Mora also screened his 8 mm 'film painting' Passion Play back-projected onto a screen framed in gold leaf.

Guy Brett compared his work in the Camden Arts Centre exhibition Narrative Painting in Britain in the Twentieth Century with that of David Hockney:

The paintings of the young Australian Philippe Mora … create the opposite atmosphere to Hockney's. They suggest networks of Fear, Threat and Violence. Yet it is not possible to compare them, because Mora uses an apparently dry and cool, economical graphic style rather than the florid impressionism one might expect… Where Hockney avoids any kind of moral judgement, Mora's pantings are thoroughly moralistic… He has an effective way of re-interpreting borrowed imagery… with his thin bleak line and his grasp of grotesque imagery. Mora does create a strong atmosphere.

=== Film ===
In October 1967 a single issue magazine Cinema Papers (named for the influential French journal Cahiers du Cinéma) was produced by students at La Trobe University and edited by Mora and Peter Beilby, and from October 1969 until April 1970, another magazine on film, in the form of an 11-issue tabloid, was published by Mora.

Trouble in Molopolis (1970), Mora's first feature-length film (the title a homage to Fritz Lang's Metropolis), was financed by the partnership of Arthur Boyd and Eric Clapton. Shot in Robert Hughes' apartment and at the Pheasantry, the film features Germaine Greer as a cabaret singer, Jenny Kee as 'Shanghai Lil', Laurence Hope as a gangster, Martin Sharp as a mime and Richard Neville as a PR man. Tony Cahill from The Easybeats collaborated with Jamie Boyd for the score before the film premiered at the Paris Pullman Cinema in Chelsea, as an Oz benefit. Introduced by George Melly, star John Ivor Golding also made a memorable appearance at the premiere, defecating in the front row and then passing out in an alcoholic coma. Shown in May 1970 at the Festival of British independent Films in London, it was eventually screened in Australia at the Adelaide Film Festival in 1980.

At age 23, Mora directed Swastika, a two-hour compilation selected from 250 hours of captured Nazi documentaries, anti-Semitic propaganda, the Berlin Olympics including an interview with a polite Jesse Owens, and sequences from home movies made by Eva Braun discovered in the United States Marine and Signal Corps files in Washington by German-born University of London academic and specialist in German film, Lutz Becker, who pointed out that it included the first piece of film ever to show Hitler, in Munich in 1919, and colour film of the Storm Troopers' victory parade in Berlin, 1933, remarking that "Even the Nazis didn't know about the 1919 piece of film with Hitler in it."

In the same year Mora became editor and American correspondent of the newly launched Cinema Papers alongside Peter Beilby and Scott Murray.Cinema Papers was first published as a nationally distributed magazine in January 1974, established by Peter Beilby, Scott Murray, and Philippe Mora.

In 1975, and newly married, Mora wrote and directed, Brother, Can You Spare a Dime?, a documentary about the 1930s Depression consisting of a series of film clips from newsreels and photographs, Hollywood films reflecting historical events, and those about making movies as well as outtakes, trailers, and home movies. It was screened at the Cannes Film Festival during 'Critics Week,' and at the 1975 Melbourne Film Festival, at which he announced that he had left Australia "because I wanted to get into films, and there was no industry here."

In 1976, after eight years working in London and New York, Mora's first feature film was Mad Dog Morgan, about the bushranger Daniel Morgan, which he also wrote and directed, explaining to Rita Erlich that while he was moving away from the documentary, in all films "one is telling a story, just using different means. Film is a narrative art." Starring Dennis Hopper, Jack Thompson, David Gulpilil, Bill Hunter and Frank Thring, produced by David Puttnam with A$175,666 investment and a A$8,500 loan from the Australian Film Corporation and private backers, Mad Dog Morgan was the first Australian movie to get a 40-cinema release in the United States and worldwide rights purchased for A$300,000 (worth nearly A$2 million in 2021). Though reviewer Michael Rowberry considered its "bid for realism has led the director to overdo the blood," and that the "simplistic morality of the film which ultimately robs it of depth," it went on to receive the John Ford Award at the Cannes Film Festival in 1976 as part of US Bicentennial celebrations, and in 1977 Mora was nominated by the Australian Film Institute for 'Best Director' for the film.

In early 1980, Mora and Ron Mallory took an option on Errol Flynn: The Untold Story by Charles Higham, raising hopes of an Australian film being produced in Hollywood, but abandoned after controversy over Higham's research; members of Flynn's family unsuccessfully sued the author and the book's publisher for libel. After making The Beast Within, his first film in America, Mora's next project on one of his periodic returns to Australia in 1981, was the parodic superhero musical, The Return of Captain Invincible, released in Hoyts cinemas for Christmas 1982 by Seven Keys, and starring Alan Arkin, Christopher Lee, Kate Fitzpatrick and an all-star Australian cast, with songs by The Rocky Horror Show creator Richard O'Brien. When Mora fell out with producer Andrew Gaty following Gaty re-cutting the film, the Department of Home Affairs pulled its certification as an Australian film asserting that it was then a different film, prompting a February 1983 court case, which was still not settled in July.

Mora's next productions were A Breed Apart with Rutger Hauer and Kathleen Turner, the werewolf horror films Howling II: Your Sister Is a Werewolf and Howling III, the latter shown at the Melbourne Comedy Festival in 1991, and the political drama Death of a Soldier, starring James Coburn, which was based on the infamous Melbourne wartime Eddie Leonski murder case. While in Australia to make the latter, Mora conducted a seminar in June 1985 at the Australian Screen Directors Association. Mora's next film used the plot of the book Communion, by his old friend from his London days in the late 1960s, artist, author and broadcaster Whitley Strieber. Released in 1989, and to video, the film starred Christopher Walken and was based on Strieber's own alleged encounters with aliens.

Film credits as director as well as occasional writer and actor during the 1990s included the horror spoof Pterodactyl Woman from Beverly Hills (1994) with Beverly D'Angelo, Barry Humphries (in three roles), Moon Unit Zappa and Philippe's children Georges and Madeleine; Art Deco Detective (1994); and Precious Find (1996), a sci-fi version of The Treasure of the Sierra Madre. For television, Mora directed Mercenary II: Thick & Thin (1997), and the films Back in Business (1997), Snide and Prejudice (1998) and Burning Down the House (1998).

=== When We Were Modern ===
In the early 2000s, with a A$25,000 'general development' fund from the Australian Film Commission, Mora began work on a still-unfinished film project titled When We Were Modern which in part touched on his own life and experience. The film's plot explores the tangled relationships of the Heide inner circle – Sidney Nolan, Joy Hester, Albert Tucker and John and Sunday Reed. In the 1940s, after deserting from the army, Nolan took refuge at the Reed's famous house "Heide", and it was here that he made the first paintings in his now world-famous Ned Kelly series. During this time, Nolan also conducted an open affair with Sunday Reed, but she refused to leave her husband and marry Nolan, so he subsequently married John's Reed's sister, Cynthia Hansen instead. The marriage eventually broke up, and when Cynthia committed suicide in 1976, her death sparked a bitter feud between Nolan and author Patrick White, which lasted until the end of their lives. White excoriated Nolan for abandoning his first wife, Elizabeth (who was a close friend of his), and for remarrying (to Mary Perceval) so soon after Cynthia's death.

At the time of the announcement, Mora had cast Australian actor Clayton Watson (The Matrix) to play Nolan, with Americans Alec Baldwin as John Reed and Jennifer Jason Leigh as Sunday Reed. During pre-production, Mora discovered previously unseen home movies of the Heide circle, including the only films of Joy Hester and the Mirka Café. When We Were Modern was to have been dedicated to Sweeney Reed, who committed suicide in March 1979, aged 34. Sweeney was to have featured prominently as a character, and as a tribute to him, Mora reportedly planned to include some of the footage from Back Alley under the closing credits.

Mora laboured on the project for several years, but it was rejected by Australian film funding bodies. Since then, Mora has worked on several other features and documentaries, but in May 2012, Deadline Hollywood reported that he was returning to the film, intended then to be an animated feature using a combination of hand puppets, stop motion and conventional animation, with the last act in 3D, supervised by 3D cinematographer Dave Gregory. The report also indicates that Clayton Watson will still portray Nolan, but will now perform the role as a voice actor. Interviewed for the report, Mora commented: "Personally I loved John and Sunday, and Sweeney Reed, their adopted son, was my best friend as a kid. My parents helped John and Sunday set up the Museum of Modern Art of Australia. This Nolan-Reed ménage is an important story that must be told honestly, no holds barred. It's a great Australian epic of love and modernism. We are using puppets done in the style of the painters involved."

=== Later career ===
In 2007, Mora obtained FBI files released under the Freedom of Information laws. In them, he uncovered evidence of an elaborate plot by Robert Kennedy to trick Marilyn Monroe into suicide; the detailed three-page implicated her psychiatrist, publicist and housekeeper as well as her friend, the British-born Hollywood actor Peter Lawford, who was married to Kennedy's sister, Patricia. In the Sydney Morning Herald, Mora affirmed that the document, sent to the FBI on 19 October 1964, was genuine.

Mora married Pamela Krause Mora, a producer and production designer who has worked on a number of his films since the 1990s, and they have three children.

== Reception and legacy ==
In 1970, The Guardian's Derek Malcolm reviewing Trouble in Molopolis then being shown at The Other Cinema's 'festival of British independents,' describes it as "a Brechtian fable directed by Philippe Mora and set to on-off Weill-like music by Tony Cahill and others. Good colour belies its cost (£6,000) and a sense of humour enlivens its serious purpose, which is to present a story of greed, stupidity and avarice in easily recognisable Marxist terms ... rough and at times amateurish ... it is distinctly original without being pretentious." The Daily Telegraph picked up on Mora's statement that "it was a problem keeping the clichés yet trying to get a fresh reaction,' of which the journalist Eric Shorter concluded; "the problem was not solved."

Though it was the official British entry at the Cannes Film Festival, Australian critic Pamela Ruskin excoriated Swastika in her review for lacking context, and thus 'whitewashing' Hitler. Micheal Billington in The Illustrated London News considered a strength was its revealing "Hitler's manifest impatience when anyone else is talking and his inability to relax even in a domestic setting: he's as rigid as a tightly rolled umbrella, as carefully wound up as a mechanical toy. Far from emphasising the gap between the private and the public face, this intriguing if fact-starved film suggests that the two were ominously indistinguishable.

When Swastika was being shown afresh three years later in Village Theatres throughout Australia, Barbara Alysen in the Sydney Tribune was less reactive, acknowledging the controversy because "we are accustomed to having documentaries tell us what to think and [...] Hitler without comment is probably still a little too ambiguous," but pointed out that though it "shows Hitler, Goering, Goebbels et al. sunbathing, playing with children and dogs, and relaxing rather than orating and inciting," the film reveals Hitler as "a rather anaemic actor, shy and ill-at-ease in front of the camera," which makes "the ruling caste come out of Eva's films looking embarrassingly puny and unassertive, [...] unconscious inferiority [being] nazism's driving force." Derek Malcolm compares Hitler: The Last Ten Days starring Alec Guinness unfavourably against Mora's "unforgettable documentary" revealing "the real thing," and Alexander Walker writing in The Evening Standard remarks that;

If you think it morally objectionable to treat such a man with the considerate focus of an admiring camera which lends if not enchantment to the view, then a mundane humanity, just consider what Albert Speer, Hitler's former architect and Armaments Minister, writes in a preface to the film – that unless we view the monster in his human shape, we may not recognise other human beings as the monsters they could become today, or tomorrow.

Susie Eisenhuth in the Australian Women's Weekly hailed Brother. Can You Spare a Dime? as a film that "manages to romp through the difficult task of presenting this unhappy time and checks out finally as a thoroughly absorbing and entertaining affair. With a breezy blend of documentary footage, much of it rare and all of it fascinating –and gems from the movie classics of the period (like Gold Diggers of 1933). Mora has assembled a superb scrapbook of the lean, mean, laugh-or-you'll-cry '30s...Best of all, young writer-director Mora understands that the most interesting history is that which chronicles events both great and small." The un-named Tharunka reviewer considers that "It's a pity that Brother Can You Spare A Dime? has been given a glossy, nostalgic image when, in fact, it is a film of importance in understanding the forces which manipulate societies without regard to any integrity of the individual." Sandra Hall in The Bulletin declared it "a documentary meticulously constructed to give the flavor of a country and a period through its ceremonies, its personalities, its news stories and its culture," while English critic Alan Stanbrook regarded its view of the Depression "oversimplified." In its subject country, America itself, Kevin Thomas praised the documentary's 'astonishing comprehensiveness' and emotional impact'

More ambivalent about melodramatic moments in Mad Dog Morgan in which "Mora loses control," Hall found it overall "a film that works hard and for the most part, effectively as a reminder of what is remarkable in Australian history." Though, according to Filmnews, it opened to "damaging" reviews in New York, Kay Keavney of the Australian Women's Weekly, in discussing Margaret Carnegie's research into the bushranger subject of Mad Dog Morgan, describes the film's creators as "arguably the world's most exciting young film-makers, Philippe Mora and Jeremy Thomas." While in Australia promoting the film, Mora gave a master class at Chiron College, which was an innovative senior secondary school in Sydney 1969–1976. Mad Dog Morgan won 'Best Direction' in the 1977 Australian Film Institute awards alongside other celebrated Australian features; Bruce Beresford's Don's Party and Henri Safran's Storm Boy.

Filmnews in 1976 offered the perspective that:

Philippe Mora's films have always been concerned with insanity...the individual insanity commonly referred to as madness, or the conditioned insanity which is that apparent state of normality termed civilized behaviour. In this context Mora's three major works, Swastika, Brother Can You Spare Dime and Mad Dog have defined three aspects of insanity so concisely that they may be regarded as testaments for the 70s.

During its 1990 showing in the UK Christopher Tookey panned Communion (1989) in the Sunday Telegraph as 'unquestionably a pain in the arse,' and calls Mora's direction 'banal,' while The Daily Telegraph rated it 'awkward and unconvincing,' Derek Malcolm considered the film hampered by audiences' low expectations of the genre, and despite its "high seriousness," "we get something more than a little dull and not much more credible than your average ET substitute."

Reviewing Mora's 1994 Art Deco Detective, Cass Hampton declared unambiguously that "straightforward it definitely is not," but concluded that "there's a lot to chew on, and may be indigestible, but it has appeal: quirky dialogue, classy black comedy and dry, understated acting. It might be somebody's cup of tea.

== Selected filmography ==
Year	Title	Notes
1969	Trouble in Molopolis	
1973	Swastika	
1975	Brother Can You Spare a Dime?	
1976	Mad Dog Morgan	
1982	The Beast Within	
1983	The Return of Captain Invincible	
1984	A Breed Apart	
1985	Howling II: Your Sister is a Werewolf	
1986	Death of a Soldier	
1987	Howling III	
1989	Communion	
1994	Art Deco Detective	
1996	Precious Find	
1997	Pterodactyl Woman from Beverly Hills	
1997	Snide and Prejudice	
1997	Back in Business	
1998	Joseph's Gift	
1999	According to Occam's Razor	
1999	Mercenary II: Thick & Thin	
2001	Burning Down the House	
2009	The Times They Ain't a Changin'	
2009	The Gertrude Stein Mystery or Some Like It Art	
2011	German Sons	
2015	Three Days in Auschwitz	
2012	Continuity	

== Exhibitions ==
Date	Title	Collaborators	Location	Notes
1967			Argus Gallery, Melbourne, Australia	
1968	Anti-Social Realism and Into Childhood		Clytie Jessop Gallery, London	
1969, to 23 February	Paintings by Philippe Mora		Clytie Jessop Gallery, London	
1969	Vomart		Clytie Jessop Gallery, London	
1970	Forgeries		Clytie Jessop Gallery, London	
1970, 23 April-22 May	Crucifixion Exhibition. An Exhibition of Degenerate Art	Mora, Powell, Ramsden, Strawheim, Sharp, Shamask, Philadelphia and other Neurotic Perverts	Sigi Krauss Gallery, 29 Neal Street, Covent Garden	
1970, 10 February–8 March	Narrative Painting in Britain in the 20th Century		Camden Arts Centre, London	
1971: 29 June-17 July	Really good taste art by P. Mora		Clytie Jessop Gallery, London	
1971, August	Recent paintings by Philippe Mora		Tolarno Galeries, 42 Fitzroy Street. St. Kilda	

== Collections ==
- National Gallery of Australia (4 works)
- National Gallery of Victoria (1 work)
- Heide Museum of Modern Art (6 works)

== Awards ==
Award	Category	Recipient	Result	Ref.
1978 Australian Film Institute Awards	AACTA Award for Best Direction	Mad Dog Morgan	Won	
15th International Festival of Fantastic & Horror Cinema, Sitges, Spain	Best Special Effects	The Return of Captain Invincible	Won	

== See also ==
- Not Quite Hollywood
- Cinema of Australia
