= Annie McEnroe =

American film actress

- Born: United States
- Occupation: Actress
- Years active: 1977-2010
- Spouse: Edward R. Pressman (m. 1983; died 2023)

Anne McEnroe is an American actress.

== Early life ==
McEnroe attended Golden High School in Golden, Colorado.

== Career ==
McEnroe is best known for her film roles in the 1980s and 1990s, most notably Jenny Templeton in 1985's Howling II: Your Sister Is a Werewolf and realtor Jane Butterfield in 1988's Beetlejuice.

== Personal life ==
In 1983, McEnroe married film producer Edward R. Pressman, whom she met on the set of The Hand, which he produced. She has one child. She remained married to Pressman until his death on January 17, 2023, at the age of 79.

== Filmography ==
Film and television
Year	Title	Role	Notes
1977	Snowbeast	Heidi	TV film
1980	Reward	Christine	TV film
1980	Running Scared	Sally Mae Giddens	
1981	The Hand	Stella Roche	
1982	Battletruck	Coraline "Corlie"	Won - Best Actress at Sitges Film Festival
1983	The Survivors	Doreen	
1984	Purple Hearts	Hallaway	
1985	Howling II: Your Sister Is a Werewolf	Jenny Templeton	
1986	True Stories	Kay Culver	
1987	Wall Street	Muffie Livingston	
1988	Cop	Amy Cranfield	
1988	Beetlejuice	Jane Butterfield Sr.	
1992	CrissCross	Mrs. Sivil	
1994	A Pig's Tale	Mrs. Lipman	Video
1994	S.F.W.	Dolly	
1997	Men	Annie	
2003	The Hebrew Hammer	Mrs. Highsmith	
