= Landon Liboiron =

Canadian actor (born 1991)

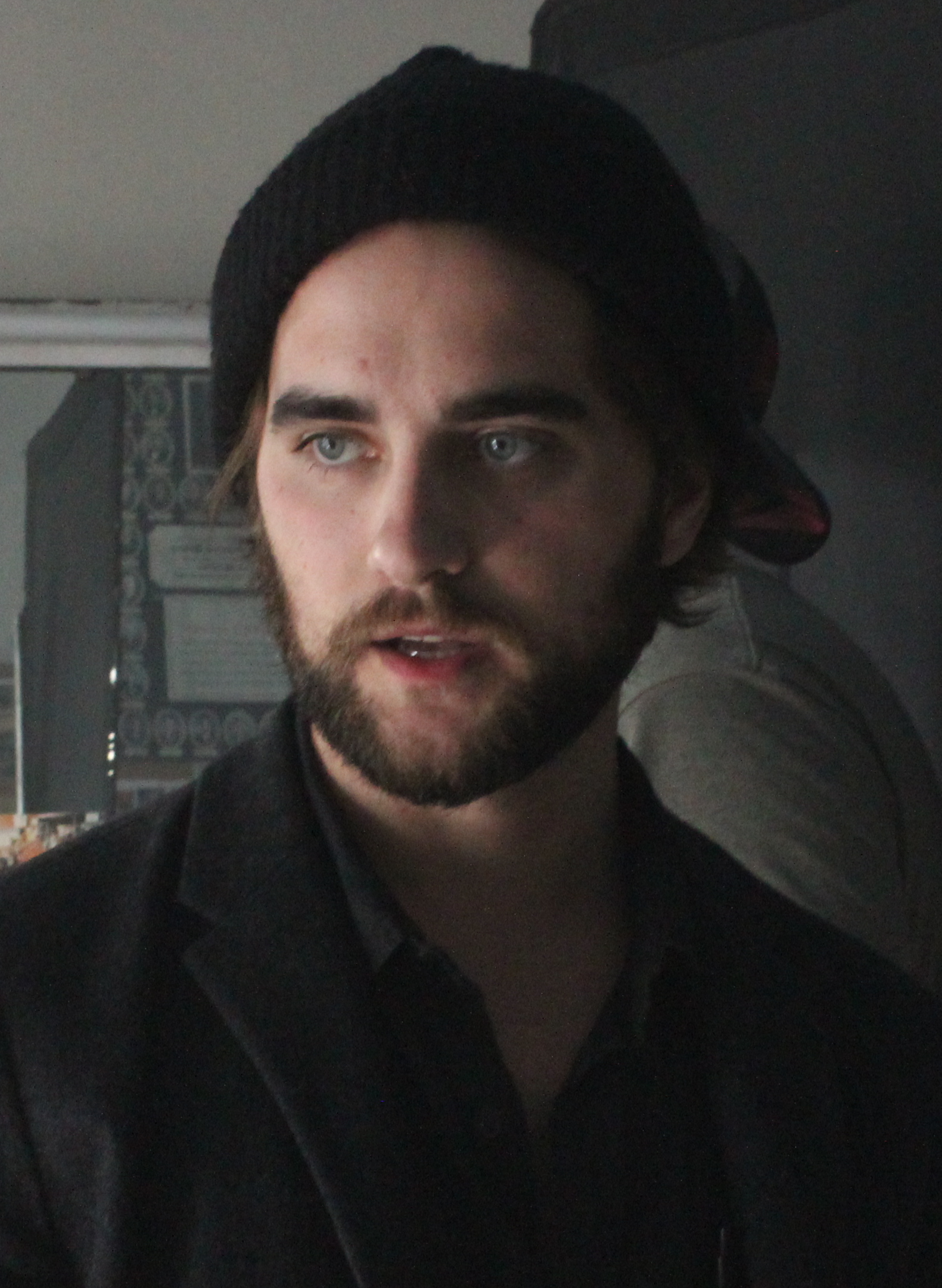
- Liboiron in 2019
- Born: March 10, 1991 (age 35)
- Occupation: Actor
- Years active: 2006–present

Landon Liboiron (born March 10, 1991) is a Canadian actor. He is best known for playing Declan Coyne in Degrassi: The Next Generation and his lead role as Peter Rumancek in Netflix's original series Hemlock Grove (2013–15).

== Early life ==
Born, the youngest of three boys for mother Lorraine (nee Mack), his older brothers being named Blake & Lance. Liboiron grew up in a small farming community in Jenner, Alberta. He has two older brothers. His mother, an artist, supportive of his desire to act, once drove her son to Vancouver for acting classes and auditions.

After graduating high school, he moved to Vancouver to pursue acting full time.

== Career ==
Liboiron was cast in TV films before his breakout role in the Canadian teen drama television series Degrassi: The Next Generation.

In 2011, Liboiron played Josh Shannon in the sci-fi television series Terra Nova, the son of the lead character, played by Jason O'Mara, and his wife, played by Shelley Conn. That same year, he appeared in the horror film The Howling: Reborn.

In 2013, Liboiron was cast in a lead role opposite Bill Skarsgård and Famke Janssen as high school student and Romani werewolf Peter Rumancek in the Netflix original series Hemlock Grove. Liboiron reprised his role in the second and third season of the series.

From 2016 to 2019, he starred as Michael Smyth in the western drama series Frontier. In 2017, Liboiron was cast as Carter / Sam Meehan in the Blumhouse supernatural thriller film Truth or Dare (2018).

In 2021, he starred in the drama film Hands That Bind.

In 2022, Liboiron co-directed and wrote the gothic satire short film Soul of a Man with Bill Skarsgård, starring Stellan and Gustaf Skarsgård. The film was based on Edgar Allen Poe's short story Bon-Bon.

== Filmography ==
=== Film ===
Year	Title	Role	Notes
2006	Broken House	Brandon	Short film
2007	Moondance Alexander	Freddie	
2008	Passchendaele	Young German soldier	
2008	Run Rabbit Run	Skate Park Kid	
2009	Zombie Punch	Mo Learner	
2010	Altitude	Bruce Parker	
2010	Daydream Nation	Paul	
2011	The Howling: Reborn	Will Kidman	Direct to video
2012	Girl in Progress	Trevor	
2012	Love Written in Blood	Michael Simon	
2014	MacKenzie Porter: If You Ask Me To	Wedding Attendant	Short film
2015	Forsaken	Will Pickard	
2015	Burning Bodhi	Dylan	
2016	Of Dogs and Men	E	Short film
2018	Truth or Dare	Carter / Sam Meehan	
2020	Come True	Jeremy	
2021	Hands That Bind	Dirk Longridge	
2023	Door Mouse	Kelly	

=== Television ===
Year	Title	Role	Notes
2007	Crossroads: A Story of Forgiveness	Brody Murakami	TV film
2007	Don't Cry Now	Sam	TV film
2007	The Dark Room	Brody Russell	TV film
2008	Flashpoint	Simon Strachan	Episode: "He Knows His Brother"
2008	Mayerthorpe	Brian Ranfield	AKA Menace
2009	Wild Roses	Jude	6 episodes
2009–2010	Degrassi: The Next Generation	Declan Coyne	Regular role; 67 episodes
2010	Degrassi Takes Manhattan	Declan Coyne	TV film
2010–2011	Life Unexpected	Sam Bradshaw	5 episodes
2011	Terra Nova	Josh Shannon	Regular role; 13 episodes
2011	Shattered	Ron Kelly	Episode: "Finding the Boy"
2011	The Haunting Hour: The Series	Josh	Episode: "The Perfect Brother"
2013–2015	Hemlock Grove	Peter Rumancek	Lead role; 33 episodes
2016–2019	Frontier	Michael Smyth	Lead role; 18 episodes
2024	Law & Order Toronto: Criminal Intent	Calvin Follows	Episode: "Three Points"
2026	Watson	Keith Prisuta	Episode: "The Tunnel Under the Elms"

=== Audio dramas ===
Year	Title	Role	Notes
2022-2023	Kurt Vonnegut: Reporter on the Afterlife	John Keats / Sir Isaac Newton / Uncle Alex	2 episodes

=== Web ===
Year	Title	Role	Notes
2016	Last Teenagers of the Apocalypse	Grim	4 episodes

== Filmmaking ==
Year	Title	Director	Writer	Notes
2020	Theo	Yes	Yes	Short film
2022	Soul of a Man	Yes	Yes	Short film; Co-director w/ Bill Skarsgård

== Awards and nominations ==
Year	Award	Category	Nominated work	Result	Notes	Ref.
2008	Alberta Film & Television Awards	Best Performance by an Alberta Actor	Mayerthorpe	Won	Film aka Menace	
2009	Alberta Film & Television Awards	Best Performance by an Alberta Actor	Wild Roses	Won		
2010	Gemini Award	Best Performance in a Children's or Youth Program or Series	Degrassi: The Next Generation	Nominated		
2017	Canadian Screen Awards	Best Performance by an Actor in a Continuing Leading Dramatic Role	Frontier	Nominated		
