= The Howling II (novel) =

Novel by Gary Brandner

- First U.S. edition cover
- Author: Gary Brandner
- Language: English
- Series: The Howling
- Subject: Werewolves
- Genre: Horror novel
- Publisher: Fawcett (U.S. edition); Hamlyn (U.K. edition)
- Publication date: 1979
- Publication place: United States
- Media type: Print (hardback and paperback)
- ISBN: 0-600-34614-5 (1984 reissue)
- OCLC: 16430110
- Preceded by: The Howling
- Followed by: The Howling III: Echoes

The Howling II is a 1979 horror novel by Gary Brandner. It is the first of two sequels to his 1977 werewolf novel, The Howling. The novel was later republished under the alternative titles The Howling II: The Return and Return of the Howling.

Despite the ongoing film series that began in the 1980s, The Howling II was not adapted as a film and bears no similarities to the sequel Howling II: Your Sister Is a Werewolf (1985) or any of the other Howling films. The eighth film The Howling: Reborn (2011) credits the book as the source of its story, but bears no resemblance to it other than being a story about werewolves.

== Plot ==
Three years after the events of The Howling, Karyn Beatty has remarried and lives in Seattle. Although content with her new life with her new husband, David Richter, and her young stepson Joey, she is still haunted by the memories of her terrifying ordeal in the California mountain village of Drago with its werewolf inhabitants. Karyn regularly sees a therapist to help work through her problems. Still, after a spate of sinister occurrences that culminate in the horrific killing of the family's housekeeper, Karyn is convinced that the surviving werewolves of Drago have tracked her down. Fearing for the lives of her new family, Karyn leaves town, hoping she will lead the evil creatures away from her loved ones.

Karyn's ex-husband, turned werewolf, Roy Beatty, and Marcia Lura track Karyn down. Both Roy and Marcia survived the fire in Drago, but Marcia is now incapacitated due to being shot in the head prior. As a result of the impact, every night, she becomes a half-woman/half-wolf creature and seeks retribution.

In Mexico, Karyn tracks down Chris Halloran, the family friend who helped her during her first ordeal in Drago. She tells him that the werewolves of Drago have come for her, and she needs his help again. However, Chris's new girlfriend, Audrey, is jealous of his prior relationship with Karyn and does everything she can to undermine their friendship. When Roy and Marcia finally track Karyn down to Mexico, they set a trap for her at a Gypsy wagon with Audrey's unwitting help, and close in for the kill. Again, Chris comes to Karyn's rescue and fights Roy. Chris eventually manages to kill Roy with a silver-bladed knife, but in the nearby Gypsy wagon, Marcia is holding Karyn hostage and is about to torture her. As night arrives, Marcia begins her agonizing change into the half-woman/half-wolf creature, causing her to start a fire and allowing Karyn to escape. Outside, Karyn is reunited with Chris while Marcia burns to death as the wagon goes up in flames.
