= Howling VI: The Freaks =

1991 British horror film

- VHS cover
- Directed by: Hope Perello
- Written by: Kevin Rock
- Produced by: Robert Pringle
- Starring: Brendan Hughes; Michele Matheson; Sean Gregory Sullivan; Antonio Fargas; Carol Lynley; Jered Barclay; Bruce Payne
- Cinematography: Edward Pei
- Edited by: Adam Wolfe
- Distributed by: Live Home Video
- Release date: 13 June 1991; (United States)
- Running time: 102 minutes
- Country: United Kingdom
- Language: English

Howling VI: The Freaks is a 1991 British direct-to-video horror film directed by Hope Perello, from a screenplay by Kevin Rock, starring Brendan Hughes, Bruce Payne, Michele Matheson, Sean Gregory Sullivan, and Carol Lynley. The Freaks is the sixth entry in the series of eight standalone films with a loose continuity.

Like most of the other films, The Freaks is loosely based on The Howling series of novels by Gary Brandner. However, minor elements from the third novel, The Howling III: Echoes, are in the film, which includes the solitary drifter Ian Richards who is cursed as a sympathetic werewolf and later recruited by R.B. Harker, a supernatural being, as well as werewolves being used in carnival freak shows.

== Plot ==
A young girl runs through the woods being chased by a creature which corners and kills her. Later, a young drifter named Ian Richards goes to the small desert town of Canton Bluff, where he befriends the local pastor Dewey and gets a job repairing the church. Ian also befriends Dewey's daughter, Elizabeth, and there is a mutual attraction. A traveling circus comes to town, and Ian takes Elizabeth there on a date, where R.B. Harker, the owner, shows them his freakshow featuring Bellamey, Harker's assistant who bites the heads off live chickens, Toones, a man with dwarfism and a third arm, Toones's lover Carl/Carlotta, a transsexual lounge singer and Winston, a young man with Ichthyosis who goes by the stage name of 'alligator boy'. That night, the president of the local bank, Anna Eddington, goes missing after being alone with Harker.

Later, Ian attempts to skip town before the full moon, as he is secretly a werewolf. He fails and transforms, with Bellamey seeing this and telling Harker. Harker captures Ian, and showing Dewey and Elizabeth Ian's curse by forcing him to transform with a crystal talisman and reciting an ancient spell. Ian wakes the next day to find himself caged at the circus. Harker appears and tells Ian that he had killed Elizabeth as a werewolf, leaving Ian distraught. In reality, this was a lie Harker told to convince him to stay, as he had kidnapped some of his other freaks, like Winston.

Winston and Ian become friends and Winston asks Ian to make him a werewolf too as he wants to be different because of his malformed skin. Ian refuses and encourages Winston to leave the circus as there is nothing wrong with him and he does not need Harker to survive. Sheriff Fuller visits Ian and reveals that Elizabeth is actually alive, but Ian still decides to stay a prisoner so he doesn't hurt anyone. Harker then adds Ian to the freakshow and forces him to transform again later that night in front of a crowd of onlookers. After Ian has transformed, Harker throws Winston's pet cat towards him, expecting Ian to kill it, but Ian gives the cat back to Winston. Harker is annoyed and immediately cancels the show, forcing Bellamey to punish Ian severely afterwards.

Suspicious of Harker, Fuller stumbles across Anna's body at the circus and attempts to arrest Harker, only for Harker to reveal that he is a vampire and kill the sheriff. The next morning, the townsfolk find Fuller's mutilated corpse and blame Ian. Ian tricks Bellamey and escapes so he can run away with Elizabeth, who believes his innocence. That night, Harker kills the mayor, Pruitt, and Ian reveals to Elizabeth that it was actually Harker who killed his family when he was a young boy and placed the werewolf curse on him. Ian returns to the circus to fight Harker once and for all, only to be ambushed by Harker and a lynch mob, all armed with guns. Harker orders them to shoot Ian but they refuse, as he is just a man. Angered at this, Harker becomes a vampire and, realizing their weapons have no effect, the townsfolk flee, leaving Harker to chase Ian.

Elizabeth arrives at the circus and is attacked by Toones, and Elizabeth shoots him dead. Carl/Carlotta witnesses this and attacks Elizabeth, but Carl/Carlotta is shot and killed by an arrow fired by Dewey. Ian finds Bellamey's corpse, as Harker presumably killed him for letting Ian escape. Ian and Harker fight, but Harker easily overpowers Ian. Winston, knowing Ian can only win if he is transformed, grabs Harker's talisman and says the spell. Ian transforms, and Harker attacks Winston by biting him in the neck. Ian rushes to assist Winston and Harker tricks him into biting Winston in the neck as well. Enraged, Ian stabs Harker in the heart with a tent stake. Ian then tears the side of the tent open and lets the morning sunlight flood in, turning Harker to dust. Ian returns to his human form and walks out of the circus towards the countryside with the badly injured Winston, leaving Elizabeth and her father behind.

== Cast ==
- Brendan Hughes as Ian Richards
- Bruce Payne as R.B. Harker
- Michele Matheson as Elizabeth
- Jered Barclay as Pastor Dewey
- Sean Gregory Sullivan as Winston-Salem III
- Antonio Fargas as Bellamey
- Carol Lynley as Miss Anna Eddington
- Christopher Morley as Carl / Carlotta
- Deep Roy as Toones
- Carlos Cervantes as Sheriff Fuller
- Randy Pelish as Mayor Pruitt
- Ben Kronen as Hank
- John A. Neris as Earl Bartlett
- Al White as Carny Worker
- Jeremy West as Lester
- Christian Roerig as Werewolf
- brief appearance by Elizabeth Shé as Marylou Summers from Howling V

== Production ==
Howling VI: The Freaks marked the first time a Howling film had been shot in the United States since the original. Much of the effects work by artist Todd Masters was cut due to director Hope Perello who stated the effects didn't advance the story or the characters and that Perello was looking to make a more psychological and character based horror film than a visceral one.

== Release ==
The film was released on VHS by International Video Entertainment in 1991. Artisan Home Entertainment and Timeless Media Group later released this film along with Howling V: The Rebirth as a double feature on DVD and as a triple feature with Howling IV: The Original Nightmare and Howling V: The Rebirth on DVD and Blu-ray.

== Reception ==
The reception for this film was initially somewhat mediocre at best, but it has improved over time. The Freaks is near-unanimously regarded as one of the best Howling sequels, with praise singled out for its characters, makeup and premise. WhatCulture ranked the film at number 3 on its list of the best Howling films: "It is so bizarre, but the flawless make-up and the resultant vampire-wolf battle make it work". Screen Rant ranked the film at number 4 on its list of the best Howling films: "The vampire design ... is actually pretty cool, and Passenger 57 actor Bruce Payne makes for a good villain". Leonard Maltin wrote in his book 2015 Movie & Video Guide that Howling VI is "intelligently written, especially for this series, but pretentious with vague Ray Bradburyesque undertones". The DVD & Video Guide 2004 noted that "special effects that leave a lot to be desired diminish this really strange entry in the long-running werewolf series". The film critic Wheeler Winston Dixon stated that the film "presents an interesting series of premises and was a neatly original entry in the long running series". He also stated that Payne gave a "delicious" performance as R.B. Harker and that, in his vampiric state, he looked "somewhat like Max Schreck in Murnau's Nosferatu, but in his humanoid state he exudes nothing but charm".

Kim Newman said that the film perked up the saga by pitting a nice-guy werewolf Ian Richards (Brendan Hughes) against a "nasty vampire" (Bruce Payne). Frederick Clarke described Payne as an "elegant and suave" vampire and also noted the Nosferatu allusions. John Ferguson stated that "Hope Perello's take on the familiar tale, in which a sort of good werewolf battles against an even more hideous band of freaks, actually holds up better than most". Andrew Pragasm wrote that "by far the strongest of The Howling sequels, film number six takes the time to explore its quirky characters and deepen relationships before getting down to the werewolf versus vampire stuff". Felix Vasquez opined that the film sought to "channel Tod Browning’s Freaks mixed with a tacked on werewolf vs. vampire battle, than actually trying to delve in to the werewolf mythos like the former movies". In Vasquez's view: "In the end, it's just a middling gimmicky sequel, with Bruce Payne giving a charismatic turn as a villain, making up for the forgettable turn by the entire cast, including Brendan Hughes". Seth Miller said that "this sequel has probably some of the most likable characters in the series, as has as some decent make-up effects work, particularly on Harker in vampire form, as well as a character named Winston (Sean Gregory Sullivan), a sympathetic man held against his will in the circus and displayed as the Alligator Boy due to a rare skin decease". Lawrence Cohn described the film as a tasteless but effective shocker.
