= The Howling =

Novel by Gary Brandner

- First U.S. edition cover
- Author: Gary Brandner
- Language: English
- Series: The Howling
- Subject: Werewolves
- Genre: Horror novel
- Publisher: Fawcett (U.S. edition); Hamlyn (U.K. edition)
- Publication date: 1977
- Publication place: United States
- Media type: Print (hardback and paperback)
- Pages: 190 (pb)
- ISBN: 0-449-13824-0 (1977 edition)
- OCLC: 17204958
- Followed by: The Howling II

The Howling is a 1977 horror novel by Gary Brandner, first published by Fawcett as a paperback original. It was the inspiration for the film The Howling (1981), although the plot of the film was only vaguely similar to that of the book.

Brandner published two sequels to the novel, The Howling II in 1979 (later republished as Return of the Howling) and The Howling III: Echoes in 1985. Neither sequel was used as the basis for any of the subsequent Howling films. However, minor elements from The Howling III: Echoes novel appear in the film Howling VI: The Freaks.

The fourth film of the series, Howling IV: The Original Nightmare (1988), is the closest adaptation of Brandner's original 1977 novel, though even it differs in parts.

== Plot ==
When middle-class wife Karyn Beatty is attacked and raped in her Los Angeles home, she suffers a miscarriage and a nervous breakdown. She and her husband, Roy, leave the city and go to stay in the secluded California mountain village of Drago while Karyn recuperates. Although the town offers Karyn a quiet lifestyle and the locals are friendly, Karyn is disturbed when she continues to hear a strange howling sound at night coming from the woods outside of their new home. This further disrupts her marriage, as Roy believes she is becoming more and more unstable, but Karyn is adamant that there is something in the woods.

As tension between the couple increases, Roy begins an affair with one of the local women, a shopkeeper named Marcia Lura. However, one night on his way home to Karen, Roy is attacked by a large black werewolf. It bites him, causing him to become a werewolf himself. Karyn eventually discovers that the town's entire population are werewolves and becomes trapped in Drago. She contacts her husband's best friend, Chris Halloran, who comes up from Los Angeles to rescue her. Chris arrives with some silver bullets which he had made at her insistence.

That night, the two of them fend off a group of werewolves, including Roy. Karyn manages to shoot the black werewolf in the head, who is revealed to be Marcia. In the commotion, a fire breaks out at Karyn's woodland house which sweeps through the woods and the entire town of Drago is engulfed in flames as Karyn and Chris escape from its cursed inhabitants. As they flee, they can still hear the howling in the distance.

== Editions ==
The Howling was published in hardcover by Mansion House Books in 2010. In 2011, Books of the Dead republished it as a standalone title and included it in a 2013 anthology edition with its two sequels.
