= Gary Brandner =

American writer

- Gary Brandner
- Born: May 31, 1930; Sault Ste. Marie, Michigan, United States
- Died: September 22, 2013 (aged 83); Reno, Nevada, United States
- Occupations: Author, screenwriter
- Spouse: Martine Wood Brandner
- Writing career
- Language: English
- Years active: 1975–2012
- Genre: Horror

Gary Phil Brandner (May 31, 1930 – September 22, 2013) was an American horror fiction author best known for his werewolf themed trilogy of novels, The Howling. The first book of the series was adapted loosely as a motion picture in 1981. Brandner's second and third Howling novels, published in 1979 and 1985 respectively, have no association with the film series, though he was involved with writing the screenplay for the second Howling film, Howling II: Your Sister Is a Werewolf. The fourth film of the Howling series, Howling IV: The Original Nightmare, is actually the closest adaptation of Brandner's original novel, though this too varies to some degree.

Brandner's novel Walkers was adapted and filmed for television as From The Dead Of Night. He also wrote the screenplay for the 1988 horror film Cameron's Closet.

== Life and career ==
Born in the Midwest and much traveled during his formative years, Brandner published more than 30 novels, more than 100 short stories, and also wrote a few screenplays. He attended college at the University of Washington where he was a member of fraternity Phi Sigma Kappa. After graduating in 1955, he worked as an amateur boxer, bartender, surveyor, loan company investigator, advertising copywriter, and technical writer before turning to fiction writing. Brandner lived with his wife, Martine Wood Brandner, and several cats in Reno, Nevada.

He died of esophageal cancer in 2013.

== Novels ==
=== The Big Brain series ===
Title	Year	Type	Pages	Notes
The Aardvark Affair	1975	novel		a.k.a. The Big Brain
The Beelzebub Business	1975	novel		
Energy Zero	1976	novel		

=== The Howling series ===
Title	Year	Type	Notes	
The Howling	1977	novel		made into the 1981 film The Howling
The Howling II	1979	novel		a.k.a. Return of the Howling
The Howling III: Echoes	1985	novel		a.k.a. The Howling III

=== Standalones ===
Title	Year	Type	Pages	Notes
Living Off the Land	1971	survival		
The Players	1975	novel		
Offshore	1978	novel		
Walkers	1980	novel		made into the television film From the Dead of Night
A Rage in Paradise	1981	novel		
Hellborn	1981	novel		
Cat People	1982	film novelization		based on the story by DeWitt Bodeen & screenplay by Alan Ormsby
Quintana Roo	1984	novel		a.k.a. Tribe of the Dead
The Brain Eaters	1985	novel		
The Wet Good-Bye	1986	novel		
Carrion	1986	novel		
Cameron's Closet	1986	novel		a.k.a. Cameron's Terror; made into the film Cameron's Closet
Floater	1988	novel		optioned by Empire Pictures with director Tobe Hooper attached
Doomstalker	1989	novel		
The Boiling Pool	1995	novel		
Mind Grabber	1999	novel		
The Experiment	1999	novella		
Rot	1999	novel		
Billy Lives	2012	novel		
The Sterling Standard	2012	novel		

== See also ==
- List of horror fiction authors
