= The Howling (film) =

1981 American horror film by Joe Dante

- Theatrical release poster
- Directed by: Joe Dante
- Screenplay by: John Sayles; Terence H. Winkless
- Based on: The Howling by Gary Brandner
- Produced by: Michael Finnell; Jack Conrad
- Starring: Dee Wallace; Patrick Macnee; Dennis Dugan; Christopher Stone; Belinda Balaski; Kevin McCarthy; John Carradine; Slim Pickens; Elisabeth Brooks
- Cinematography: John Hora
- Edited by: Mark Goldblatt; Joe Dante
- Music by: Pino Donaggio
- Production companies: International Film Investors; Wescom Productions
- Distributed by: Avco Embassy Pictures
- Release date: March 13, 1981
- Running time: 91 minutes
- Country: United States
- Language: English
- Budget: $1.7 million
- Box office: $17.9–20 million

The Howling is a 1981 American horror film directed and edited by Joe Dante, written by John Sayles and Terence H. Winkless, and starring Dee Wallace, Patrick Macnee, Dennis Dugan, Christopher Stone, Belinda Balaski, Kevin McCarthy, John Carradine, Slim Pickens, and Elisabeth Brooks. Based on the 1977 novel of the same name by Gary Brandner, the film follows a news anchor who, following a traumatic encounter with a serial killer, visits a resort secretly inhabited by werewolves.

The Howling was released in the United States on March 13, 1981, and became a moderate success, grossing $17.9 million at the box office. It received generally positive reviews, with praise for the makeup special effects by Rob Bottin. The film won the 1980 Saturn Award for Best Horror Film and was one of the three high-profile werewolf-themed horror films released in 1981, alongside An American Werewolf in London and Wolfen.

Its financial success aided Dante's career, and prompted Warner Bros. to hire Dante and Michael Finnell as director and producer, respectively, for Gremlins (1984). A series consisting of seven sequels arose from the film's success. A remake is in development, with Andy Muschietti set to direct.

== Plot ==
Karen White is a Los Angeles television news anchor who is being stalked by serial killer Eddie Quist. In cooperation with the police, she takes part in a sting operation to capture Eddie by agreeing to meet him in a pornography shop's video booth. Eddie forces Karen to watch a video of a young woman being gang-raped, and when Karen turns around to look at Eddie at his request, she screams. The police enter and shoot Eddie, and although Karen is safe, she is afflicted by amnesia. Her therapist, "Doc" George Waggner, recommends sending her and her husband, Bill Neill, to the Colony, a secluded resort in the countryside where he sends patients for treatment.

The Colony is filled with strange people, including the sultry Marsha Quist, a practitioner of witchcraft revealed to be Eddie's sister, who tries to seduce Bill. After he resists her overt sexual overtures, he is attacked and bitten on the arm by a wolf while returning to his cabin. After Bill is attacked, Karen calls her coworker and friend Terry Fisher and asks her to come to the Colony after hearing strange howling at night. Terry connects the resort to Eddie through a sketch he left behind, having previously discovered that Eddie's body disappeared from the morgue. Karen begins to suspect that Bill is hiding a secret marital infidelity. Later that night, Bill meets Marsha at a campfire in the woods, and while having sex in the moonlight, they undergo a frightening transformation into werewolves.

While investigating the following day, Terry is attacked by a werewolf in Eddie's cabin, though she escapes after severing its hand with an ax. She runs to Doc's office and calls her boyfriend, fellow news team member Chris Halloran, who has been alerted about the Colony's true nature. While on the phone with Chris, Terry looks for files on Eddie Quist. When she finally finds the file in the filing cabinet, she is attacked by Eddie in werewolf form and killed. Chris hears the attack over the phone and sets off for the Colony armed with silver bullets.

Karen is confronted by the resurrected Eddie Quist once again, and Eddie transforms himself into a werewolf in front of her. Karen splashes Eddie in the face with corrosive acid and flees. Chris arrives at the Colony and is confronted by the disfigured Eddie and his brother, who mock him with Terry's corpse, but are fatally shot with silver bullets as they attempt to transform and attack Chris. All the people at the Colony are revealed to be werewolves and they too begin to transform, after shoving aside Doc when he pleads for them to continue trying to assimilate into human society. Karen and Chris trap the remaining werewolves, including a dying Doc, in the barn and burn the Colony to the ground. As they drive away, a werewolf breaks into their car and bites Karen. She shoots the werewolf dead, and he turns back into Bill as he dies.

Karen resolves to warn the entire world about the existence of werewolves and begins a special worldwide broadcast. To prove the truth of her words, she transforms into a werewolf on the air. She is then shot by Chris on camera, although the audience who see this happen on TV are amused, believing everything to have been a stunt done with special effects. A man sitting at the bar orders a steak for himself and a rare hamburger for Marsha, who escaped the Colony completely unscathed, as Karen's newscast cuts to a commercial break for dog food.

== Cast ==
- Dee Wallace as Karen White
- Patrick Macnee as Dr. George Waggner
- Dennis Dugan as Chris Halloran
- Christopher Stone as R. William "Bill" Neill
- Belinda Balaski as Terry Fisher
- Kevin McCarthy as Fred Francis
- John Carradine as Erle Kenton
- Slim Pickens as Sam Newfield
- Elisabeth Brooks as Marsha Quist
- Robert Picardo as Eddie Quist
- Margie Impert as Donna
- Noble Willingham as Charlie Barton
- James Murtaugh as Jerry Warren
- Jim McKrell as Lew Landers
- Kenneth Tobey as Older Cop
- Dick Miller as Walter Paisley
- Meshach Taylor as Shantz
- Don McLeod as T.C. Quist

== Production ==
Theater chain owner turned producer Steven Lane had long wanted to get into film production and was an avid horror reader, particularly of Stephen King.

A blurb from King on the cover of the 1977 book The Howling by Gary Brandner drew Lane's interest, and eventually he looked into the prospect of buying the rights to make a film adaptation. After tracking down the rights to Warner Bros., who'd done nothing in the two years since acquiring them, he discovered they had resold the rights to director Jack Conrad. Lane partnered with Conrad on The Howling with the two getting the film set up at Avco Embassy Pictures.

After drafts by Jack Conrad (who left the project early after disputes with the studio) and Terence H. Winkless proved unsatisfactory, director Joe Dante hired John Sayles to completely rewrite the script. The two had collaborated before on Dante's 1978 film Piranha. Sayles rewrote the script with the same self-aware, satirical tone that he gave Piranha, and his finished draft bears only a vague resemblance to Brandner's book. However, Winkless still received a writing credit for his screenplay work.

The cast featured many recognizable character actors, such as Kevin McCarthy, John Carradine, Kenneth Tobey, and Slim Pickens, many of whom appeared in genre films themselves. Additionally, the film was full of in-joke references. Roger Corman makes a cameo appearance as a man standing outside a phone booth, as does John Sayles, appearing as a morgue attendant, and Jonathan Kaplan as a gas station attendant. Forrest J Ackerman appears in a brief cameo in an occult bookstore, clutching a copy of an issue of his magazine Famous Monsters of Filmland.

The Howling was also notable for its special effects, which were state-of-the-art at the time. The transformation scenes were created by Rob Bottin, who had also worked with Dante on Piranha. Rick Baker was the original effects artist for the film, but left the production to work on An American Werewolf in London, which released the same year as The Howling, handing over the effects work to Bottin. Bottin's most celebrated effect was the on-screen transformation of Eddie Quist, which involved air bladders under latex facial applications to give the illusion of transformation. Variety claimed that The Howling's biggest flaw is that the impact of this initial transformation is never topped during the film's climax. The film also features stop-motion animation by David W. Allen, and puppetry intended to give the werewolves an even more non-human look. Allen produced three full stop-motion animated sequences for use in the film to be inter cut with scenes using the original rod puppet werewolf model. Following a preview screening, it was decided that Allen's stop-motion sequences didn't mesh with the full size suit that had replaced the rod puppet and only one shot of Allen's animation made it into the final film.

Due to their work in The Howling, Dante and producer Michael Finnell received the opportunity to make the film Gremlins (1984) for Steven Spielberg. That film references The Howling with a smiley face image on a refrigerator door. Eddie Quist leaves yellow smiley face stickers as his calling card in several places throughout The Howling. Also, Jim McKrell's character as news reporter Lew Landers appears in both The Howling and Gremlins.

=== Music ===
Pino Donaggio composed the score, which featured classic orchestral horror melodies with minimal synth sounds. Waxwork Records released the full soundtrack on a double LP in 2017. The album art was done by Francesco Francavilla.

=== Finance ===
International Film Investors (IFI) agreed to provide 50% of the finance. Goldcrest Films had a partnership with IFI. They ended up providing £145,000 to the budget of The Howling and receiving £396,000, making a profit of £251,000.

== Release ==
The film opened on March 13, 1981, in 170 theatres in New York City, Philadelphia and the Washington D.C.—Baltimore area.

=== Home media ===
The Howling was released on DVD by MGM Home Entertainment in 2001, with a special edition release following on August 26, 2003.

Shout! Factory re-released The Howling on DVD and Blu-ray on June 18, 2013, through their Scream Factory imprint. Scream Factory reissued the film in 4K UHD Blu-ray on February 15, 2022.

== Reception ==
=== Box office ===
The film grossed $1,160,172 in its opening weekend. Per Variety's weekly chart, based on a sample of 20-24 markets, the film was ranked number one for the week; however, Back Roads, which opened in 635 more theatres, grossed more nationally, with $3 million. The Howling grossed $17.9 million in the United States and Canada.

=== Critical response ===
On the review aggregator website Rotten Tomatoes, The Howling holds a 77% approval rating based on 132 critic reviews. The consensus reads: "The Howling packs enough laughs into its lycanthropic carnage to distinguish it from other werewolf entries, with impressive creature effects adding plenty of bite". Metacritic, which uses a weighted average, assigned the film a score of 68 out of 100, based on 11 critics, indicating "generally favorable" reviews.

Vincent Canby of The New York Times criticized the film's focus on sex and the pacing while conceding that the script was "ridiculous but it's not stupid" and noted the humorous takes on television. In 1981, Roger Ebert's 2-out-of-4 star review described The Howling as the "silliest film seen in some time", but Ebert also said the special effects were good and the film was perhaps "worth your money, IF you get it two for one". Gene Siskel liked the film and gave it three and a half stars out of four. In his Movie Guide, Leonard Maltin wrote that The Howling is a "hip, well-made horror film" and noted the humorous references to classic werewolf cinema. Variety praised both the film's sense of humor and its traditional approach to horror. Kim Newman, in his 1988 book Nightmare Movies, called The Howling "a brisk chiller that effortlessly revives the prowling-through-misty-forests genre", and called Picardo's transformation sequence "the movies' most impressive werewolf monster".

The film won the 1980 Saturn Award for Best Horror Film. (Note: While the film was released in 1981, the Saturn Awards, being awarded in July at the time, did not follow the calendar year and a handful of films released prior to May 1981 were nominated for the 1980 awards.) This film was also #81 on Bravo's 100 Scariest Movie Moments.

== Themes and style ==
According to Scott Tobias of The Guardian, the film played a pivotal role in modernizing classic movie monsters, particularly werewolves, by incorporating graphic practical effects and explicit sexuality while interweaving references to the film's context; it also, loosely, referenced the Jonestown incident, as the lead character, Karen, retreated to a forest community known as ‘The Colony’.

According to The New York Times, The Howling introduces themes of indulgence of primal, animalistic desires, particularly focusing on the sexual aspects of werewolves. It also offers a satirical commentary on television and the media, with its sensationalistic approach, focusing on personalities like Dr. George Waggner. The film also critiques how television sensationalizes violence and focuses on the darker aspects of human nature.

== Sequels and remake ==
There have been seven sequels to The Howling. In May 2015, a newly formed production company bought the rights to the original film and were working on a ninth film, a remake of the original. In 2020, Andy Muschietti was hired to direct the remake for Netflix.

A comic book series by Space Goat Productions entitled The Howling: Revenge of the Werewolf Queen began publication in May 2017, acting as a direct sequel to the original film, ignoring the film sequels.
