= Motorcycle Gang (1994 film) =

1994 film directed by John Milius

- Written by: Laurie McQuillan; Kent Anderson
- Directed by: John Milius
- Starring: Gerald McRaney; Jake Busey; Carla Gugino
- Theme music composer: Hummie Mann
- Country of origin: United States
- Original language: English

Production
- Producers: Lou Arkoff; Debra Hill; Willie Kutner; David Giler
- Cinematography: Anthony B. Richmond
- Editor: Mark Helfrich
- Running time: 84 min
- Production company: Drive-In Classics Cinema
- Budget: $1.3 million

Original release
- Network: Showtime Networks
- Release: August 5, 1994

Motorcycle Gang is a 1994 American drama film that originally aired on the cable television network Showtime as part of the anthology series Rebel Highway. As with other films in the series, its name is taken from a 1950s B-movie but its plot bears no resemblance to that film. The film was directed by John Milius, who considers it one of his favorites.

== Plot ==
A motorcycle gang terrorizes army veteran Cal Morris and his family as they are driving on the highway to their new home in California. When the gang kidnaps Cal's daughter Leann and takes her to Mexico, Cal and his wife pursue them.

== Cast ==
- Gerald McRaney as Cal Morris
- Jake Busey as Jake
- John Cassini as "Crab"
- Richard Edson as Volker
- Carla Gugino as Leann Morris
- Elan Oberon as Jean Morris
- Marshall R. Teague as Kincaid
- Don McManus as Cisco
- Julia McNeal as Vivian
- Pete Anico as "Road Pig"
- Peter Sherayko as Hanson
- Dawn Cody as Bunny
- Rorion Gracie as Sergeant Lopez
- Orestes Matacena as Gortman
- Todd Starks as Jerry
- Gina Mastrogiacomo as Waitress
- Jennifer Holliday Morrison as Mexican Harlot (credited as Jennifer Linsley Morrison)

== Production ==
When asked why he chose to remake Motorcycle Gang, Milius said "Why not? I never saw it. I just took a story that was kind of endemic to the period. What happened in those movies is that they always had a family crossing the desert and the family is beset by giant ants, cannibals or a hot rod or motorcycle gang. So in this one I have a dysfunctional family beset by a motorcycle gang."

Just before filming was to begin, the Jan. 17 Northridge earthquake interrupted shooting plans. Milius said, "We couldn't get to any of the locations since mine was by far, location-wise and production-wise, the most ambitious of all of them because it all takes place out-of-doors and in the desert. We couldn't get to any of those places, so we had to find alternate ways of doing it. I thought it was very challenging and I enjoyed the challenge a great deal."

The film was an early lead role for Jake Busey who call it "the most dynamic role I've had the opportunity to play," he says. "I grew up racing Motocross, off-road bikes. It's very dangerous. I quit when I was 17, after a good friend broke his back. I still have a bike. For the movie, I slicked back my hair like they did in the '50s, wore sunglasses and rode a Harley Davidson. This was definitely a thrilling experience."

== Release ==
The film was the third in the series to be screened, after Roadracers and Confessions of a Sorority Girl.
