= Jailbreakers =

- Genre: Drama
- Written by: Debra Hill; Gigi Vorgan
- Directed by: William Friedkin
- Starring: Shannen Doherty
- Music by: Hummie Mann
- Original language: English

Production
- Producers: Debra Hill; Willie Kutner; Lou Arkoff
- Cinematography: Cary Fisher
- Editor: Augie Hess
- Running time: 76 min.
- Production companies: Drive-In Classics; Showtime Networks; Spelling Films International

Original release
- Network: Showtime
- Release: September 9, 1994

Jailbreakers is a 1994 television film directed by William Friedkin. Filming took place in Southern California and it was released on September 9, 1994. The film originally aired on Showtime as part of their Rebel Highway series that took the titles of 1950s-era B-movies and applied them to original films. The film was later released on VHS.

== Plot ==
The film takes place in the 1950s. Angel is a 15-year-old cheerleader who has her life all ahead of her. She falls in love with Tony Falcon, a drug dealing high school drop-out. A nighttime outing leads to trouble and Angel and Tony are caught. Although Tony is the only one who is sent to jail, Angel has it very hard as well. She is estranged from her parents and her friends refuse ever to talk to her. The family think it is for the best for them to move to new surroundings.

Angel and her family move to a nice and quiet suburbia. She starts an entire new life and even falls in love with a new boy. However, she is soon in trouble when Tony escapes from jail and interrupts her sweet sixteen. He takes her away from her family and together they try to escape to Mexico. A chase follows, with the police and Angel's father trying to catch Tony.

== Cast ==
- Shannen Doherty - Angel Norton
- Antonio Sabàto, Jr. - Tony Falcon
- Vince Edwards - Mr. Norton
- Adrienne Barbeau - Mrs. Norton
- Adrien Brody - Skinny
- Sean Whalen - Tattoo
- Talbert Morton - Whale
- Chris Conrad - Jack
- Johnny La Spada - Gary
- Kerri Randles - Missy
- Dana Barron - Sue
