= Confessions of a Sorority Girl =

- DVD cover
- Genre: Comedy drama
- Based on: Sorority Girl by Leo Lieberman; Ed Waters
- Written by: Debra Hill; Gigi Vorgan
- Directed by: Uli Edel
- Starring: Jamie Luner; Alyssa Milano; Brian Bloom
- Theme music composer: Hummie Mann
- Country of origin: United States
- Original language: English

Production
- Producers: Debra Hill; Lou Arkoff; Willie Kutner
- Production locations: Chateau Bradbury Estate; Malibu, California
- Editors: Erik C. Andersen; Glenn Farr
- Running time: 82 mins.
- Production companies: Drive-In Classics; Showtime Networks; Spelling Films International; American International Pictures

Original release
- Network: Showtime
- Release: July 29, 1994

Confessions of a Sorority Girl (also known as Confessions of Sorority Girls) is a 1994 American television film that debuted on Showtime on July 29, 1994. Directed by Uli Edel, the film stars Alyssa Milano and Jamie Luner.

The film is loosely based on the 1957 exploitation film Sorority Girl, starring Susan Cabot and Barboura Morris. Confessions of a Sorority Girl is a part of Showtime's Rebel Highway series that featured films using titles from Dwight D. Eisenhower-era B-movies, also including Roadracers (1994) and Girls in Prison (1994).

== Plot ==
In the 1950s, Sabrina Masterson is a conceited and wealthy teenager who is sent by her own mother to college to live at Alpha Beta Pi, a sorority house, because she could not handle her anymore, explaining she was too evil. Upon her arrival, she is welcomed by everyone and assigned as the roommate of Rita Summers, the sorority president and most adored and popular girl. Sabrina soon takes an interest in her boyfriend Mort, who owns a bar at the beach near the sorority house and will soon enroll into medical school, hoping to become a doctor. She tries to flirt with him but is unamused by his indifference. She soon starts taking it out on Rita and her friends Tina and Ellie, often embarrassing them or making catty remarks without directly confronting or insulting them. In spite of that, Rita still tries to befriend Sabrina and tells her about her bad relationship with her mother, explaining that she is often too busy to talk to her. Sabrina tries to upset her even more by saying that her relationship with her mother is very good.

It soon turns out that is false. Mrs. Masterson gives her a surprise visit, expressing her disappointment in her. She tells Sabrina that she wants her to be more like her older sister Julia, who was once the sorority president, and terminates her allowance because of breaking a rule. Later that day, Sabrina and Ellie overhear Tina announcing that she is pregnant of her boyfriend Jimmy, who she secretly sees. Tina expresses her worries, considering an abortion. Sabrina helps her out not getting caught and thereby wins their trust. The next day, Ellie and Tina nominate her for sorority president, meaning she will be competing against Rita. When she finds out she can only become president if her grades for French are better, she seduces her teacher Professor Leland and later blackmails him.

Later that night, Sabrina blackmails Rita to give up her title as sorority president, threatening to reveal that her mother is in jail if she does not. The next day, she is upset to find out her mother thinks less of her becoming president, explaining she is too busy to attend the ceremony. She tries to find comfort with Mort, who openly disparages her. Jealous, she reveals Rita's secret about her mother, thinking it will end his relationship with her. Mort reacts madly. Sabrina later witnesses Mort being rejected by Rita when he tries to sleep with her and she thinks she can profit from that information to win him back. In his bar, she seduces him into having sex with her. At first, he rejects her but he finally gives in. Meanwhile, Tina went to Tijuana for an abortion but she was too afraid to go through with it. Not knowing what to do with her future, she bursts out in tears.

The next morning, Sabrina reveals that she has slept with Mort. Rita refuses to believe her but when Mort admits to it, she is furious and slaps him. Sabrina, hoping they can finally be in a relationship, is surprised he turns her down and swears he will regret it. She tells Joe, who thinks he is her boyfriend, that he raped her. The plan backfires when Mort convinces Joe he would not do that, also assuring him that Sabrina is bad news. She next convinces Tina to tell everyone that Mort is the father of her baby, thereby possibly assuring her financial support. After the announcement, she is kicked out of campus but, after a suicide attempt, keeps on blackmailing Mort. Vulnerable, she admits to him that she was pushed by Sabrina to do so. After she left, it turns out that he recorded the conversation. Later, Tina accepts a marriage proposal from Jimmy. Rita decides to rekindle with Mort after she hears the audio conversation. A jealous Sabrina, realizing she has been caught, hits Mort with a bat and beats up Rita. She locks them into Mort's bar and sets it on fire. They are rescued by Jimmy and Sabrina is arrested.

== Cast ==
- Jamie Luner as Sabrina Masterson
- Alyssa Milano as Rita Summers
- Brian Bloom as Mort
- Sadie Stratton as Tina
- Danni Wheeler as Ellie
- Natalia Nogulich as Mrs. Masterson
- Peter Simmons as Jimmy
- David Brisbin as Professor Leland
- Judson Mills as Joe

== Production notes ==
The film was shot on location in Duarte and Malibu, California.
