= Dragstrip Girl =

Dragstrip Girl may refer to:

- Dragstrip Girl (1957 film), an American crime drama film
- Dragstrip Girl (1994 film), an American drama film
