= Shake, Rattle and Rock! (1994 film) =

1994 film

- Genre: Drama; Music
- Written by: Trish Soodik
- Directed by: Allan Arkush
- Starring: Renée Zellweger; Howie Mandel; Max Perlich; John Doe
- Theme music composer: Joseph L. Altruda
- Country of origin: United States
- Original language: English

Production
- Producers: Lou Arkoff; Debra Hill; Willie Kutner
- Cinematography: Jean de Segonzac
- Editor: Mark Helfrich
- Running time: 83 min.
- Production company: Spelling Films International

Original release
- Network: Showtime
- Release: August 26, 1994

Shake, Rattle and Rock! is a 1994 television film directed by Allan Arkush and starring Renée Zellweger, Howie Mandel, and members of the Grammy-nominated R&B band For Real.The film was produced by Lou Arkoff (son of B movie producer Samuel Z. Arkoff) as part of the Rebel Highway series of television films made in a short-lived revival of American International Pictures that aired on the Showtime television network. The television film was a partial remake of the 1956 film of same name.

== Plot ==
In a small 1950s American town, three teenagers Susan, Cookie, and Tony, start a nightclub in an act of teenage rebellion. The club's host, Danny Klay, introduces a new musical talent to entertain guests, which becomes a source of debate for the townsfolk.

== Cast ==
- Renée Zellweger as Susane
- Howie Mandel as Danny Klay
- Patricia Childress as Cookie
- Max Perlich as Tony
- Latanyia Baldwin as Sireena
- Necia Bray as The Sirens
- Josina Elder as The Sirens
- Wendi Williams as The Sirens
- Gerrit Graham as Lipsky
- John Doe as Lucky
- James Intveld as Bubber
- Riki Rachtman as Eddie Cochran
- Danny Boy as Cochran's Drummer Boy
- Nora Dunn as Margo
- Mary Woronov as E. Joyce Togar
- Dey Young as Kate Rambeau Sr
- P. J. Soles as Evelyn Randall
- Jenifer Lewis as Amanda
- Ruth Brown as Ella
- Stephen Furst as Frank
- Julianna Raye as Eggroll's Guitar Girl
- Dick Miller as Officer Paisley
- William Schallert as Judge Boone
- Ron Jackson as Thomas Taylor
- Dominic Keating as Marc (uncredited)

== Soundtrack ==
- "The Girl Can't Help It" – Little Richard
- "Ain't That a Shame – Fats Domino
- "C'mon Everybody – Eddie Cochran
- "Blue Moon" – For Real
- "Do You Wanna Dance?" – For Real
- "She Put the Bomp" – For Real
- "Look In My Eyes" – For Real
- "All Around the World" – For Real and Julianna Raye
- "Every Night" – The Robins
- "Since I First Met You" – The Robins
- "Lonely Teenager" – Julianna Raye
- "You Oughta Know Me Better" – Julianna Raye

== Critical reception ==
A review by Aaron Beierle for DVD Talk reads, ""Shake, Rattle and Rock" had the potential to be a fun, entertaining look at the influence of rock in Small Town, USA, but it doesn't seem to aspire (or have the budget) to be much more than a bland outing."

A review by Tracy Moore for Common Sense Media reads, "The real drawback is that it's a colorless rendition of what likely was a much more exciting era in reality -- like Grease without any of the wit, songs, or charm."

Todd Everett of Variety wrote: "Latest installment in Showtime's nostalgic Rebel Highway series of exploitation pic homages, Shake, Rattle and Rock draws its inspiration from the 1957 film released under the same title, plus John Waters' 1989 Hairspray and director Allan Arkush's own 1979 Rock 'n' Roll High School. While not as effective as either of the latter two, it's easygoing fun, with good music and several well-cast cameos."
