= Ralph Bakshi =

American animator and filmmaker (born 1938)

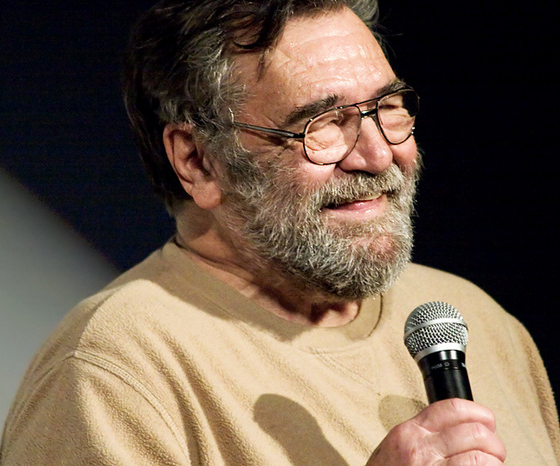
- Bakshi in January 2009
- Born: October 29, 1938 (age 88); Haifa, Mandatory Palestine
- Occupations: Animator; filmmaker; painter
- Years active: 1956–2015 (animation); 1953–present (artist)
- Notable work: Fritz the Cat; Heavy Traffic; Coonskin; Wizards; The Lord of the Rings; American Pop; Hey Good Lookin'; Fire and Ice; Cool World; Spicy City
- Style: Adult animation; Comedy drama; Fantasy; Urban fiction; Black comedy
- Spouses: Elaine Bakshi; Elisabeth Bassett "Liz" Bakshi
- Children: 4
- Relatives: Miles Bakshi (grandson); Gina Shay (daughter-in-law)
- Awards: Inkpot Award (2008)
- Website: ralphbakshi.com

Ralph Bakshi (born October 29, 1938) is an American animator and filmmaker, known for his fantastical animated films. In the 1970s, he established an alternative to mainstream animation through independent and adult-oriented productions. Between 1972 and 1994, he directed nine theatrically released feature films, predominantly urban dramas and fantasy films, five of which he wrote. He has also been involved in numerous television projects as director, writer, producer and animator.

Beginning his career at the Terrytoons television cartoon studio as a cel polisher, Bakshi was eventually promoted to animator and then director. He moved to the animation division of Paramount Pictures in 1967 and started his own studio, Bakshi Productions, in 1968. Through producer Steve Krantz, Bakshi made his debut feature film, Fritz the Cat, released in 1972. It was based on the comic strip by Robert Crumb, was the first animated film to receive an X rating from the Motion Picture Association of America, and remains the most successful independent animated feature of all time.

Over the next 11 years, Bakshi directed seven additional animated features. He is well known for such films as Wizards (1977), The Lord of the Rings (1978), American Pop (1981), and Fire and Ice (1983). In 1987, Bakshi returned to television work, producing the series Mighty Mouse: The New Adventures, which ran for two years. After a nine-year hiatus from feature films, he directed Cool World (1992), which was largely rewritten during production and received poor reviews, consequently being his last theatrical feature-length film to date. Bakshi returned to television with the live-action film Cool and the Crazy (1994) and the anthology series Spicy City (1997).

During the 2000s, he focused largely on fine art and painting, and in 2003, co-founded the Bakshi School of Animation with his son Eddie and Jess Gorell. Bakshi has received several awards for his work, including the 1980 Golden Gryphon for The Lord of the Rings at the Giffoni Film Festival, the 1988 Annie Award for Distinguished Contribution to the Art of Animation, and the 2003 Maverick Tribute Award at the Cinequest Film Festival.

== Early life ==
Ralph Bakshi was born on October 29, 1938, in Haifa, Mandatory Palestine, to a Krymchak Jewish family. In 1939, his family migrated to the United States. Bakshi grew up in the Brownsville neighborhood of Brooklyn. The family lived in a low-rent apartment at 241 Bristol Street, where Bakshi became fascinated with the urban milieu. As a child, he enjoyed comic books. Bakshi often dug through trash cans to find them.

According to an interview in 2009, Bakshi said he was very poor and the walls of his apartment building were constantly repainted. He liked the feeling when he looked out the window and saw the sun as a little boy. Whenever Bakshi would walk out in the streets, someone would break open the wooden crates in the push-carts that were filled with food, stating as such: "And the push carts were wood, and most of the buildings were made out of old wood, going back to the turn of the century, and they were repainted a lot but the paint was faded by, you know the hundred years of snow and rain, repainted and faded again." Bakshi loved the faded colors, the nails, the wooden crates, and he would build his own toys from the wood. He recalled having "a great feeling with wood, cement, and nails".

In the spring of 1947, Bakshi's father and uncle traveled to Washington, D.C., in search of business opportunities, and soon moved the family to the Black neighborhood of Foggy Bottom. Bakshi recalled, "All my friends were black, everyone we did business with was black, the school across the street was black. It was segregated, so everything was black. I went to see black movies; black girls sat on my lap. I went to black parties. I was another black kid on the block. No problem!"

The racial segregation of local schools meant that the nearest white school was several miles away; Bakshi obtained his mother's permission to attend the nearby Black school with his friends. Most of the students had no problem with Bakshi's presence, but a teacher sought advice from the principal, who called the police. Fearing that segregated whites would riot if they learned that a white, let alone Jewish, student was attending a Black school, the police removed Bakshi from his classroom. Meanwhile, his father had been suffering from anxiety attacks. Within a few months, the family moved back to Brownsville, where they rarely spoke of these events.

At the age of fifteen, after discovering Gene Byrnes' Complete Guide to Cartooning at the public library, Bakshi took up cartooning to document his experiences and create fantasy-influenced art. He stole a copy of the book and learned every lesson in it. During his teenaged years, Bakshi took up boxing. While attending Thomas Jefferson High School, he took little interest in academics, spending most of his time focusing on "broads, mouthing off, and doodling". After participating in a food fight and being caught smoking, Bakshi was sent to the principal's office. Believing Bakshi was unlikely to prosper at Thomas Jefferson, the principal transferred him to Manhattan's School of Industrial Art. At the school, he was taught by African-American cartoonist Charles Allen. In June 1956, Bakshi graduated from the school with an award in cartooning. He attended and graduated from the School of Industrial Art (now known as the High School of Art and Design) in 1956.

== Career ==
=== Early career (1956–1967) ===
When Bakshi was 18, his friend Cosmo Anzilotti was hired by the cartoon studio Terrytoons; Anzilotti recommended Bakshi to the studio's production manager, Frank Schudde. Bakshi was hired as a cel polisher and commuted four hours each day to the studio, based in suburban New Rochelle. His low-level position required Bakshi to carefully remove dirt and dust from animation cels.

After a few months, Schudde was surprised that Bakshi was still showing up to work, so he promoted him to cel painter. Bakshi began to practice animating; to give himself more time, at one point he slipped 10 cels that he was supposed to work on into the "to-do" pile of a fellow painter, Leo Giuliani. Bakshi's deception was not noticed until two days later, when he was called to Schudde's office because the cels had been painted on the wrong side. When Bakshi explained that Giuliani had made the mistake, an argument ensued between the three. Schudde eventually took Bakshi's side. By this point, the studio's employees were aware of Bakshi's intention to become an animator, and he received help and advice from established animators, including Connie Rasinski, Manny Davis, Jim Tyer, Larry Silverman, and Johnnie Gentilella.

Bakshi married his first wife, Elaine, when he was 21. Their son, Mark, was born when Bakshi was 22. Elaine disliked his long work hours; parodying his marital problems, Bakshi drew Dum Dum and Dee Dee, a comic strip about a man determined "to get—and keep—the girl".

As he perfected his animation style, he began to take on more jobs, including creating design tests for the studio's head director, Gene Deitch. Deitch was not convinced that Bakshi had a modern design sensibility. In response to the period's political climate and as a form of therapy, Bakshi drew the comic strips Bonefoot and Fudge, which satirized "idiots with an agenda", and Junktown, which focused on "misfit technology and discarded ideals".

Bakshi's frustrations with his failing marriage and the state of the planet further drove his need to animate. In 1959, he moved his desk to join the rest of the animators; after asking Rasinski for material to animate, he received layouts of two scenes: a hat floating on water and a running Deputy Dawg, the lead character of a Terrytoons' series then being shown on CBS. Despite threats of repercussion from the animators' union, Rasinski fought to keep Bakshi as a layout artist. Bakshi began to see Rasinski as a father figure; Rasinski, childless, was happy to serve as Bakshi's mentor.

At the age of 25, Bakshi was promoted to director. His first assignment was the series Sad Cat. Bakshi and his wife had separated by then, giving him the time to animate each short alone. Bakshi was dissatisfied with the traditional role of a Terrytoons director: "We didn't really 'direct' like you'd think. We were 'animation directors,' because the story department controlled the storyboards. We couldn't affect anything, but I still tried. I'd re-time, mix up soundtracks—I'd fuck with it so I could make it my own."

Other animation studios, such as Hanna-Barbera, were selling shows to the networks, even as the series produced by Terrytoons (which was owned by CBS) were declining in popularity. In 1966, Bill Weiss asked Bakshi to help him carry presentation boards to Manhattan for a meeting with CBS. The network executives rejected all of Weiss's proposals as "too sophisticated", "too corny", or "too old-timey".

As Fred Silverman, CBS's daytime programming chief, began to leave the office, an unprepared Bakshi pitched a superhero parody called The Mighty Heroes on the spot. He described the series' characters, including Strong Man, Tornado Man, Rope Man, Cuckoo Man, and Diaper Man: "They fought evil wherever they could, and the villains were stupider than they were."

The executives loved the idea, and while Silverman required a few drawings before committing, Weiss immediately put Bakshi to work on the series' development. Once Silverman saw the character designs, he confirmed that CBS would greenlight the show, on the condition that Bakshi would serve as its creative director and to oversee the entire project. It would appear as a segment of Mighty Mouse Playhouse on the network's 1966–67 Saturday-morning schedule; the series was renamed Mighty Mouse and the Mighty Heroes in recognition of the new segment.

Bakshi received a pay raise, but was not as satisfied with his career advancement as he had anticipated; Rasinski had died in 1965, Bakshi did not have creative control over The Mighty Heroes, and he was unhappy with the quality of the animation, writing, timing, and voice acting. Although the series' first 20 segments were successful, Bakshi wanted to leave Terrytoons to form his own company. In 1967, he drew up presentation pieces for a fantasy series called Tee-Witt, with help from Anzilotti, Johnnie Zago, and Bill Foucht.

On the way to the CBS offices to make his pitch, he was involved in a car accident. At the auto body shop, he met Liz, who later became his second wife. Though CBS passed on Tee-Witt, its designs served as the basis for Bakshi's 1977 film Wizards. While leaving the network offices, he learned that Paramount Pictures had recently fired Shamus Culhane, the head of its animation division. Bakshi met with Burt Hampft, a lawyer for the studio, and was hired to replace Culhane.

Bakshi enlisted comic-book and pulp-fiction artists and writers Harvey Kurtzman, Lin Carter, Gray Morrow, Archie Goodwin, Wally Wood, and Jim Steranko to work at the studio. After finishing Culhane's uncompleted shorts, he directed, produced, wrote, and designed four short films at Paramount: The Fuz, Mini-Squirts, Marvin Digs, and Mouse Trek.

Marvin Digs, which Bakshi conceived as a "flower child picture", was not completed the way he had intended: It "was going to have curse words and sex scenes, and a lot more than that. [...] Of course, they wouldn't let me do that." He described the disappointing result as a "typical 1967 limited-animation theatrical". Animation historian Michael Barrier called the film "an offensively bad picture, the kind that makes people who love animation get up and leave the theater in disgust". Production of Mighty Heroes ended when Bakshi left Terrytoons.

Bakshi served as head of the studio for eight months before Paramount closed its animation division on December 1, 1967. He learned that his position was always intended to be temporary and that Paramount never intended to pick up his pitches. Although Hampft was prepared to offer Bakshi a severance package, Bakshi immediately ripped up the contract.

Hampft suggested that Bakshi work with producer Steve Krantz, who had recently fired Culhane as supervising director on the Canadian science-fiction series Rocket Robin Hood. Bakshi and background artist Johnnie Vita soon headed to Toronto, planning to commute between Canada and New York, with artists such as Morrow and Wood working from the United States.

Unknown to Bakshi, Krantz and producer Al Guest were in the middle of a lawsuit. Failing to reach a settlement with Guest, Krantz told Bakshi to grab the series' model sheets and return to the United States. When the studio found out, a warrant for Bakshi's arrest was issued by the Toronto police. He narrowly avoided capture before being stopped by an American border guard, who asked him what he was doing. Bakshi responded, "All of these guys are heading into Canada to dodge the draft and I'm running back into the States. What the fuck is wrong with that!?" The guard laughed, and let Bakshi through. Vita was detained at the airport; he was searched and interrogated for six hours.

=== Bakshi Productions and Fritz the Cat (1968–1972) ===
Bakshi soon founded his own studio, Bakshi Productions, in the Garment District of Manhattan, where his mother used to work and which Bakshi described as "the worst neighborhood in the world". Bakshi Productions paid its employees higher salaries than other studios and expanded opportunities for female and minority animators. The studio began work on Rocket Robin Hood, and later took over the Spider-Man television series. Bakshi married Liz in August 1968. His second child, Preston, was born in June 1970.

In 1969, Ralph's Spot was founded as a division of Bakshi Productions to produce commercials for Coca-Cola and Max, the 2000-Year-Old Mouse, a series of educational shorts paid for by Encyclopædia Britannica. Bakshi was uninterested in the kind of animation the studio was turning out, and wanted to produce something personal. He soon developed Heavy Traffic, a tale of inner-city street life. Krantz told Bakshi that Hollywood studio executives would be unwilling to fund the film because of its content and Bakshi's lack of film experience, and would likely consider it if his first film was an adaptation; luckily, he would find a comic that would become his first animated feature.

While browsing the East Side Book Store on St. Mark's Place, Bakshi came across a copy of Robert Crumb's Fritz the Cat. Impressed by Crumb's sharp satire, Bakshi purchased the book and suggested to Krantz that it would work as a film. Krantz arranged a meeting with Crumb, during which Bakshi presented the drawings he had created while learning the artist's distinctive style to prove that he could adapt Crumb's artwork to animation. Impressed by Bakshi's tenacity, Crumb lent him one of his sketchbooks for reference.

Preparation began on a studio pitch that included a poster-sized cel featuring the comic's cast against a traced photo background—as Bakshi intended the film to appear. Despite Crumb's enthusiasm, the artist refused to sign the contract Krantz drew up. Artist Vaughn Bodē warned Bakshi against working with Crumb, describing him as "slick". Bakshi later agreed with Bodé's assessment, calling Crumb "one of the slickest hustlers you'll ever see in your life". Krantz sent Bakshi to San Francisco, where he stayed with Crumb and his wife, Dana, in an attempt to persuade Crumb to sign the contract. After a week, Crumb left, leaving the film's production status uncertain. Two weeks after Bakshi returned to New York, Krantz entered his office and told Bakshi that he had acquired the film rights through Dana, who had Crumb's power of attorney and signed the contract. Crumb was subsequently hostile both to the film and Bakshi. Krantz produced a sequel, The Nine Lives of Fritz the Cat (1974), to which Crumb was steadfastly opposed, having wanted to kill Fritz off to avoid further movies.

After Bakshi pitched the project to every major Hollywood studio, Warner Bros. bought it and promised an $850,000 budget. Bakshi hired animators with whom he had worked in the past, including Vita, Tyer, Anzilotti, and Nick Tafuri, and began the layouts and animation. The first completed sequence was a junkyard scene in Harlem, in which Fritz smokes marijuana, has sex, and incites a revolution. Krantz intended to release the sequence as a 15-minute short in case the picture's financing fell through; Bakshi, however, was determined to complete the film as a feature. They screened the sequence for Warner Bros. executives, who wanted the sexual content toned down and celebrities cast for the voice parts. Bakshi refused, and Warner Bros. pulled out, leading Krantz to seek funds elsewhere. He eventually made a deal with Jerry Gross, the owner of Cinemation Industries, a distributor specializing in Exploitation films. Although Bakshi did not have enough time to pitch the film, Gross agreed to fund its production and distribute it, believing that it would fit in with his exploitation slate.

An image from Fritz the Cat, with Fritz and a trio of young women he is trying to pick up by Washington Square Park: The background demonstrates one of the film's stylistic innovations—it is a watercolor painting based on a tracing from a photograph.

Despite receiving financing from other sources, including Saul Zaentz (who agreed to distribute the soundtrack album on his Fantasy Records label), the budget was tight enough to exclude pencil tests, so Bakshi had to test the animation by flipping an animator's drawings in his hand before they were inked and painted. When a cameraman realized that the cels for the desert scenes were not wide enough and revealed the transparency, Bakshi painted a cactus to cover the mistake. Very few storyboards were used. Bakshi and Vita walked around the Lower East Side, Washington Square Park, Chinatown, and Harlem, taking moody snapshots. Artist Ira Turek inked the outlines of these photographs onto cels with a Rapidograph, the technical pen preferred by Crumb, giving the film's backgrounds a stylized realism virtually unprecedented in animation. The tones of the watercolor backgrounds were influenced by the work of Ashcan School painters such as George Luks and John French Sloan. Among other unusual techniques, bent and fisheye camera perspectives were used to portray the way the film's hippies and hoodlums viewed the city. Many scenes featured documentary recordings of real conversations in place of scripted dialogue; this, too, would become a signature of Bakshi's.

In May 1971, Bakshi moved his studio to Los Angeles to hire additional animators. Some, including Rod Scribner, Dick Lundy, Virgil Walter Ross, Norman McCabe, and John Sparey, welcomed Bakshi and felt that Fritz the Cat would bring diversity to the animation industry. Other animators were less pleased by Bakshi's arrival and placed an advertisement in The Hollywood Reporter, stating that his "filth" was unwelcome in California. By the time production wrapped, Cinemation had released Melvin Van Peebles' Sweet Sweetback's Baadasssss Song to considerable success, despite the X rating it had received. When the Motion Picture Association of America gave Bakshi's film an X rating as well, Cinemation exploited it for promotional purposes, advertising Fritz the Cat as "90 minutes of violence, excitement, and SEX ... he's X-rated and animated!" Variety called it an "amusing, diverting, handsomely executed poke at youthful attitudes". John Grant writes in his book Masters of Animation that Fritz the Cat was "the breakthrough movie that opened brand new vistas to the commercial animator in the United States", presenting an "almost disturbingly accurate" portrayal "of a particular stratum of Western society during a particular era, [...] as such it has dated very well." Fritz the Cat was released on April 12, 1972, opening in Hollywood and Washington, D.C. A major hit, it became the most successful independent animated feature of all time. The same month as the film's release, Bakshi's daughter, Victoria, was born.

=== Heavy Traffic (1972–1973) ===
By the time Fritz the Cat was released, Bakshi had become a celebrity. However, his reputation was primarily based upon his having directed the first "dirty" animated film. Facing criticism of his work on publicity tours and in trade publications, Bakshi began writing poetry to express his emotions. This became a tradition, and Bakshi wrote poems before beginning production on each of his films. The first of these poems was "Street Arabs", which preceded the production of Heavy Traffic in 1972. Inspiration for the film came from penny arcades, where Bakshi often played pinball, sometimes accompanied by his 12-year-old son, Mark. Bakshi pitched Heavy Traffic to Samuel Z. Arkoff, who expressed interest in his take on the "tortured underground cartoonist" and agreed to back the film. Krantz had not compensated Bakshi for his work on Fritz the Cat, and halfway through the production of Heavy Traffic, Bakshi asked when he would be paid. Krantz responded, "The picture didn't make any money, Ralph. It's just a lot of noise." Bakshi found Krantz's claims dubious, as the producer had recently purchased a new BMW and a mansion in Beverly Hills. Bakshi did not have a lawyer, so he sought advice from fellow directors with whom he had become friendly, including Martin Scorsese, Francis Ford Coppola, and Steven Spielberg. He soon accused Krantz of ripping him off, which the producer denied.

As he continued to work on Heavy Traffic, Bakshi began pitching his next project, Harlem Nights, a film loosely based on the Uncle Remus story books. The idea interested producer Albert S. Ruddy, whom Bakshi encountered at a screening of The Godfather. Bakshi received a call from Krantz, who questioned him about Harlem Nights. Bakshi said, "I can't talk about that", and hung up. After locking Bakshi out of the studio the next day, Krantz called several directors, including Chuck Jones, in search of a replacement. Arkoff threatened to withdraw his financial backing unless Krantz rehired Bakshi, who returned a week later.

Bakshi wanted the voices to sound organic, so he experimented with improvisation, allowing his actors to ad lib during the recording sessions. Several animation sequences appear as rough sketchbook pages. The film also incorporated live-action footage and photographs. Although Krantz, in an attempt to get the film an R rating, prepared different versions of scenes involving sex and violence, Heavy Traffic was rated X. Due to the success of Fritz the Cat, though, many theaters were willing to book adult-oriented animation, and the film did well at the box office. Bakshi became the first person in the animation industry since Walt Disney to have two financially successful movies released consecutively. Heavy Traffic was very well received by critics. Newsweek applauded its "black humor, powerful grotesquerie, and peculiar raw beauty." The Hollywood Reporter called it "shocking, outrageous, offensive, sometimes incoherent, occasionally unintelligent. However, it is also an authentic work of movie art and Bakshi is certainly the most creative American animator since Disney." Vincent Canby of The New York Times ranked Heavy Traffic among his "Ten Best Films of 1973". Upon release, the movie was banned by the Film Censorship Board in the province of Alberta, Canada.

=== Coonskin (1973–1975) ===
In 1973, Bakshi and Ruddy began the production of Harlem Nights, which Paramount was originally contracted to distribute. While Fritz the Cat and Heavy Traffic proved that adult-oriented animation could be financially successful, animated films were still not respected, and Bakshi's pictures were considered to be "dirty Disney flicks" that were "mature" only for depicting sex, drugs, and profanity. Harlem Nights, based on Bakshi's firsthand experiences with racism, was an attack on racist prejudices and stereotypes. Bakshi cast Scatman Crothers, Philip Michael Thomas, Barry White, and Charles Gordone in live-action and voice roles, cutting in and out of animation abruptly rather than seamlessly because he wanted to prove that the two media could "coexist with neither excuse nor apology". He wrote a song for Crothers to sing during the opening title sequence: "Ah'm a Niggerman". Its structure was rooted in the history of the slave plantation—slaves would "shout" lines from poems and stories great distances across fields in unison, creating a natural beat. Bakshi has described its vocal style, backed by fast guitar licks, as an "early version of rap".

Bakshi intended to attack stereotypes by portraying them directly, culling imagery from blackface iconography. Early designs in which the main characters (Brother Rabbit, Brother Bear, and Preacher Fox) resembled figures from The Wind in the Willows were rejected. Bakshi juxtaposed stereotypical designs of Black characters with even more negative depictions of white racists, but the film's strongest criticism is directed at the Mafia. Bakshi said, "I was sick of all the hero worship these guys got because of The Godfather." Production concluded in 1973. During editing, the title was changed to Coonskin No More..., and finally to Coonskin. Bakshi hired several African-American animators to work on Coonskin, including Brenda Banks, the first African-American female animator. Bakshi also hired graffiti artists and trained them to work as animators. The film's release was delayed by protests from the Congress of Racial Equality, which called Bakshi and his film racist. After its distribution was contracted to the Bryanston Distributing Company, Paramount cancelled a project that Bakshi and Ruddy were developing, The American Chronicles.

Coonskin, advertised as an exploitation film, was given limited distribution and soon disappeared from theaters. Initial reviews were negative; Playboy commented that "Bakshi seems to throw in a little of everything and he can't quite pull it together." Eventually, positive reviews appeared in The Hollywood Reporter, New York Amsterdam News (an African-American newspaper), and elsewhere. The New York Times' Richard Eder said the film "could be [Bakshi's] masterpiece [...] a shattering successful effort to use an uncommon form—cartoons and live action combined-to convey the hallucinatory violence and frustration of American city life, specifically black city life [...] lyrically violent, yet in no way [does it] exploit violence". Variety called it a "brutal satire from the streets". A reviewer for the Los Angeles Herald-Examiner wrote, "Certainly, it will outrage some and, indeed, it's not Disney. [...] The dialog it has obviously generated—if not the box-office obstacles—seems joltingly healthy." Bakshi called Coonskin his best film.

=== Hey Good Lookin' (1973–1975/1982) ===
After production concluded on Harlem Nights, Bakshi wanted to distinguish himself artistically by producing a film in which live action and animated characters would interact. Bakshi said, "The illusion I attempted to create was that of a completely live-action film. Making it work almost drove us crazy." Hey Good Lookin' is set in Brooklyn during the 1950s; its lead characters are Vinnie, the leader of a gang named "The Stompers", his friend Crazy Shapiro, and their girlfriends, Roz and Eva. Vinnie and Crazy Shapiro were based on Bakshi's high-school friends Norman Darrer and Allen Schechterman. Warner Bros. optioned the screenplay and greenlit the film in 1973.

An initial version of Hey Good Lookin' was completed in 1975. A three-minute promotion of this version was screened at the 1975 Cannes Film Festival, and the film was scheduled for a Christmas 1975 release, but was moved to the summers of 1976 and later 1977, before ultimately being postponed indefinitely. Warner Bros. was concerned about any controversy the film would encounter as a result of the backlash over the film Coonskin, and felt that the film was "unreleasable" because of its mix of live action and animation, and it would not spend further money on the project. Bakshi financed the film's completion himself from the director's fees for other projects such as Wizards, The Lord of the Rings, and American Pop. The live-action sequences of Hey Good Lookin' were gradually replaced by animation; among the eliminated live-action sequences was one featuring the glam punk band New York Dolls. Singer Dan Hicks worked on the initial musical score, but the final version was scored by John Madara.

Hey Good Lookin' opened in New York City on October 1, 1982, and was released in Los Angeles in January 1983. The film's release was limited, and went largely unnoticed in the United States, although it garnered respectable business in foreign markets. In a brief review, Vincent Canby wrote that it was "not exactly incoherent, but whatever it originally had on its mind seems to have slipped away". Animation historian Jerry Beck wrote, "the beginning of the film is quite promising, with a garbage can discussing life on the streets with some garbage. This is an example of what Bakshi did best—using the medium of animation to comment on society. Unfortunately, he doesn't do it enough in this film. There is a wildly imaginative fantasy sequence during the climax, when the character named Crazy starts hallucinating during a rooftop shooting spree. This scene almost justifies the whole film. But otherwise, this is a rehash of ideas better explored in Coonskin, Heavy Traffic, and Fritz the Cat." The film has since gained a cult following through cable television and home video. Quentin Tarantino stated that he preferred Hey Good Lookin' to Martin Scorsese's Mean Streets.

=== Shift to fantasy film (1976–1978) ===
In 1976, Bakshi pitched War Wizards to 20th Century Fox. Returning to the fantasy drawings he had created in high school for inspiration, Bakshi intended to prove that he could produce a "family picture" that had the same impact as his adult-oriented films. British illustrator Ian Miller and comic book artist Mike Ploog were hired to contribute backgrounds and designs. The crew included Vita, Turek, Sparey, Vitello and Spence, who had become comfortable with Bakshi's limited storyboarding and lack of pencil tests. As the production costs increased, Fox president Alan Ladd Jr. declined Bakshi's requests for salary increases, and refused to give him $50,000 to complete the film. At the same time, Ladd was dealing with similar budget problems on George Lucas's Star Wars. Bakshi and Lucas had negotiated contracts entitling them to franchise ownership, merchandising and back-end payment, so Ladd suggested that they fund the completion of their films themselves.

Bakshi chose rotoscoping as a cost-effective way to complete the movie's battle scenes with his own finances. Because he could not afford to hire a film crew or actors, or develop 35 mm stock, Bakshi requested prints of films that contained the type of large battle scenes needed, including Sergei Eisenstein's Alexander Nevsky, and spliced together the footage he needed. However, the cost of printing photographs of each frame would have cost $3 million. Learning that IBM had introduced an industrial-sized photocopier, Bakshi asked one of the company's technical experts if he would be able to feed 35 mm reels into the machine to produce enlarged copies of each frame. The experiment worked, and Bakshi got the pages he needed for a penny per copy.

As War Wizards neared completion, Lucas requested that Bakshi change the title of his film to Wizards to avoid conflict with Star Wars; Bakshi agreed because Lucas had allowed Mark Hamill to take time off from Star Wars to record a voice for Wizards. Although Wizards received a limited release, it was successful in the theaters that showed it and developed a worldwide audience. Dave Kehr of The Chicago Reader saw it as "marred by cut-rate techniques and a shapeless screenplay". In the view of film historian Jerry Beck, the lead character, an aging sorcerer, "clearly owes much to cartoonist Vaughn Bodé's Cheech Wizard character."

In late 1976, Bakshi learned that John Boorman was contracted to direct an adaptation of The Lord of the Rings, in which J. R. R. Tolkien's three-volume novel would be condensed into a single film. Bakshi arranged a meeting with Mike Medavoy, United Artists' head of production, who agreed to let Bakshi direct in exchange for the $3 million that had been spent on Boorman's screenplay. Down the hall from Medavoy was Metro-Goldwyn-Mayer president Dan Melnick, who interrupted a meeting with Peter Bogdanovich when he learned that Bakshi wanted to discuss acquiring the rights to The Lord of the Rings. Melnick agreed to pay United Artists $3 million, but was soon fired; the project was canceled by his replacement, Dick Shepherd. Bakshi contacted Saul Zaentz, who wrote a check to cover MGM's debt and agreed to fund the $8 million budget for the first of what was initially planned as a series of three films, and later negotiated down to two. Before production began, Bakshi and Zaentz insisted that the Tolkien estate receive residuals from the film.

Bakshi did not want to produce a broad cartoon version of the tale, so he planned to shoot the entire film in live action and animate the footage with rotoscoping. The film also incorporated brief cel animation and straightforward live-action footage. Production of the live-action sequences took place in Spain. During the middle of a large shoot, union bosses called for a lunch break, and Bakshi secretly shot footage of actors in Orc costumes moving toward the craft service table, and used the footage in the film. Jerry Beck later wrote that, while he found the rotoscoped animation "beautiful", he felt that it was unclear whether the use of live action was an artistic choice or due to budgetary constraints.

After the Spanish film development lab discovered that telephone lines, helicopters and cars were visible in the footage, they tried to incinerate it, telling Bakshi's first assistant director, "if that kind of sloppy cinematography got out, no one from Hollywood would ever come back to Spain to shoot again." When Bakshi returned to the United States, he learned that the cost of developing blown-up prints of each frame had risen. He did not want to repeat the process that had been used on Wizards, which was unsuitable for the level of detail he intended for The Lord of the Rings, so Bakshi and camera technician Ted Bemiller created their own photographic enlarger to process the footage cheaply. Live-action special effects and analog optics were used in place of animation to keep the visual effects budget low and give the film a more realistic look. Among the voice actors was the well-regarded John Hurt, who performed the role of Aragorn. The project's prominence brought heavy trade journal coverage, and fans such as Mick Jagger visited the studio for the chance to play a role. Animator Carl Bell loved drawing Aragorn so much that Bakshi gave Bell the live-action Aragorn costume, which he wore while animating.

Viewing The Lord of the Rings as a holiday film, United Artists pressured Bakshi to complete it on schedule for its intended November 15, 1978, release. Once it was finished, Bakshi was told that audiences would not pay to see an incomplete story; over his objections, The Lord of the Rings was marketed with no indication that a second part would follow. Reviews of the film were mixed, but it was generally seen as a "flawed but inspired interpretation". Newsday's Joseph Gelmis wrote that "the film's principal reward is a visual experience unlike anything that other animated features are doing at the moment". Roger Ebert called Bakshi's effort a "mixed blessing" and "an entirely respectable, occasionally impressive job [which] still falls far short of the charm and sweep of the original story". Vincent Canby found it "both numbing and impressive". David Denby of New York felt that the film would not make sense to viewers who had not read the book. He wrote that it was too dark and lacked humor, concluding, "The lurid, meaningless violence of this movie left me exhausted and sickened by the end." The film, which cost $4 million to produce, grossed $30.5 million. The studio refused to fund the sequel, which would have adapted the remainder of the story. The Lord of the Rings won the Golden Gryphon at the 1980 Giffoni Film Festival.

=== American Pop and Fire and Ice (1979–1983) ===
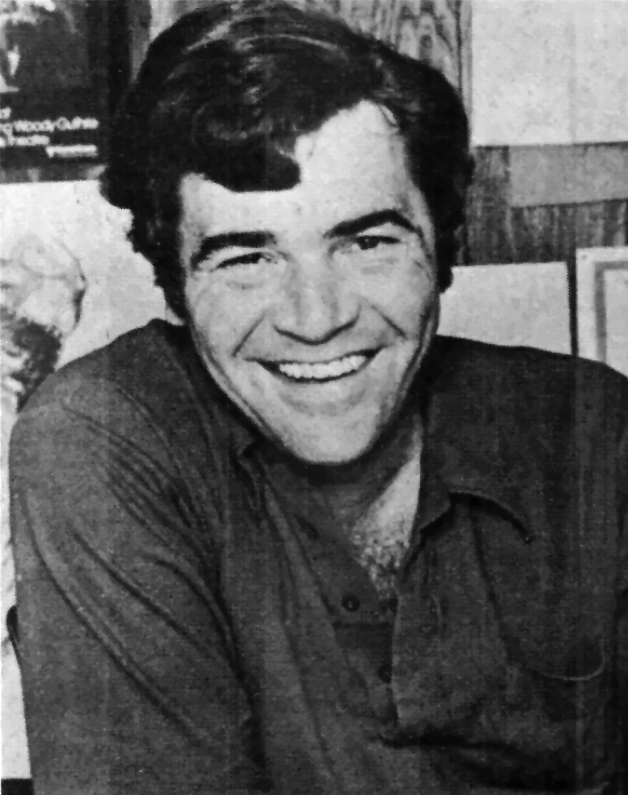
Bakshi in 1979

Following the production struggles of The Lord of the Rings, Bakshi decided to work on something more personal. He pitched American Pop to Columbia Pictures president Dan Melnick. Bakshi wanted to produce a film in which songs would be given a new context in juxtaposition to the visuals. American Pop follows four generations of a Russian Jewish immigrant family of musicians, whose careers parallel the history of American pop and starred actor Ron Thompson in a dual lead role. While the film does not reflect Bakshi's own experiences, its themes were strongly influenced by people he had encountered in Brownsville. The film's crew included character layout and design artist Louise Zingarelli, Vita, Barry E. Jackson, and Marcia Adams. Bakshi again used rotoscoping, in an attempt to capture the range of emotions and movement required for the film's story. According to Bakshi, "Rotoscoping is terrible for subtleties, so it was tough to get facial performances to match the stage ones." Bakshi was able to acquire the rights to an extensive soundtrack—including songs by Janis Joplin, The Doors, George Gershwin, The Mamas & the Papas, Herbie Hancock, Lou Reed, and Louis Prima—for under $1 million. Released on February 13, 1981, the film was a financial success. The New York Times' Vincent Canby wrote, "I'm amazed at the success that Mr. Bakshi has in turning animated characters into figures of real feelings." Jerry Beck called it "one of Bakshi's best films". Due to music clearance issues, it was not released on home video until 1998.

Also during this time, Bakshi made plans to self-finance a series of animated shorts called Bakshi's Fables, though the only one to be produced was The Cigarette and the Weed (1981), which did not receive a wide release but was featured briefly in Halloween III: Season of the Witch (1982). In February 2025, Bakshi released The Cigarette and the Weed in full via his social media accounts.

By 1982, fantasy films such as The Beastmaster and Conan the Barbarian had proven successful at the box office, and Bakshi wanted to work with his long-time friend, the fantasy illustrator Frank Frazetta. Fire and Ice was financed by some of American Pop's investors for $1.2 million, while 20th Century Fox agreed to distribute. Fire and Ice was the most action-oriented story Bakshi had directed, so he again used rotoscoping; the realism of the design and rotoscoped animation replicated Frazetta's artwork. Bakshi and Frazetta were heavily involved in the production of the live-action sequences, from casting sessions to the final shoot. The film's crew included background artists James Gurney and Thomas Kinkade, layout artist Peter Chung, and established Bakshi Productions artists Sparey, Steve Gordon, Bell and Banks. Chung greatly admired Bakshi's and Frazetta's work, and animated his sequences while working for The Walt Disney Company. The film was given a limited release, and was financially unsuccessful. Andrew Leal wrote, "The plot is standard [...] recalling nothing so much as a more graphic episode of Filmation's He-Man series. [...] Fire and Ice essentially stands as a footnote to the spate of barbarian films that followed in the wake of Arnold Schwarzenegger's appearance as Conan."

=== Unproduced projects and temporary retirement (1983–1986) ===
After production of Fire and Ice wrapped, Bakshi attempted several projects that fell through, including adaptations of Hunter S. Thompson's Fear and Loathing in Las Vegas, William Kotzwinkle's The Fan Man, E. R. Eddison's The Worm Ouroboros, Stephen Crane's Maggie: A Girl of the Streets, Mickey Spillane's Mike Hammer novels and an anthropomorphic depiction of Sherlock Holmes. He turned down offers to direct Ray Bradbury's Something Wicked This Way Comes and Philip K. Dick's Do Androids Dream of Electric Sheep?. He passed the latter to Ridley Scott, who adapted it into the 1982 film Blade Runner (although he was planning a TV version of said film). In 1983, he was set to direct a film adaptation of the Robert E. Howard character Red Sonya of Rogatino, but after production was pushed back a year, Bakshi was replaced with Richard Fleischer, who also directed the previous Robert E. Howard adaptation Conan the Destroyer (1984).

During this period, Bakshi reread J. D. Salinger's The Catcher in the Rye, which he had first read in high school, and saw parallels between his situation and that of the book's protagonist, Holden Caulfield. Inspired to seek the film rights, he intended to shoot the story's bracketing sequences in live action and to animate the core flashback scenes. Salinger had rejected previous offers to adapt the novel, and had not made a public appearance since 1965 or granted an interview since 1980. Bakshi sent Salinger a letter explaining why he should be allowed to adapt the novel; the writer responded by thanking Bakshi and asserting that the novel was unfit for any medium other than its original form.

Prompted in part by Salinger's letter, Bakshi briefly retired to focus on painting. During this time he completed the screenplay for If I Catch Her, I'll Kill Her, a live-action feature he had been developing since the late 1960s. United Artists and Paramount Pictures each paid Bakshi to develop the film in the 1970s, but were unwilling to produce it, as were the studios he pitched the film to in the 1980s. According to Bakshi, "They thought that no one was going to admit that women can—and do—cheat on their husbands. They thought it was too hot, which made no sense." In 1985, he received a phone call from The Rolling Stones' manager, Tony King, who told Bakshi that the band had recorded a cover of Bob & Earl's "Harlem Shuffle", and wanted Bakshi to direct the music video. He was told that the live-action shoot needed to be completed within one day (January 28, 1986) for it to be shown at the Grammy Awards. Production designer Wolf Kroeger was forced to drastically compact his sets, and animation director and designer John Kricfalusi had to push his team, including Lynne Naylor, Jim Smith and Bob Jaques, to complete the animation within a few weeks. The band's arrival at the set was delayed by a snowstorm and several takes were ruined when the cameras crossed paths. Bakshi was forced to pay the union wages out of his own fees, and the continuity between Kricfalusi's animation and the live-action footage did not match; however, the video was completed on time.

Bakshi recognized Kricfalusi's talent, and wanted to put him in charge of a project that would showcase the young animator's skills. Bakshi and Kricfalusi co-wrote the screenplay Bobby's Girl as a take on the teen films of the era. Jeff Sagansky, president of production at TriStar Pictures, put up $150,000 to develop the project, prompting Bakshi to move back to Los Angeles. When Sagansky left TriStar, Bakshi was forced to pitch the film again, but the studio's new executives did not understand its appeal and cut off financing. Bakshi and Zingarelli began to develop a feature about Hollywood's Golden Age, and Bakshi Productions crewmembers worked on proposed cartoons influenced by pulp fiction. Bobby's Girl was reworked as a potential primetime series called Suzy's in Love, but attracted no serious interest. They would try again in 2003 over at Spümcø, but nothing came from this either.

=== Return to television (1987–1989) ===
In April 1987, Bakshi set up a meeting with Judy Price, the head of CBS's Saturday morning block. Three days before the meeting, Bakshi, Kricfalusi, Naylor, Tom Minton, Eddie Fitzgerald and Jim Reardon met to brainstorm. Bakshi remembers, "My car was packed to the windows. Judy was my last stop before driving cross country back to New York to my family." Price rejected Bakshi's prepared pitches, but asked what else he had. He told her that he had the rights to Mighty Mouse, and she agreed to purchase the series. However, Bakshi did not own the rights and did not know who did. While researching the rights, he learned that CBS had acquired the entire Terrytoons library in 1955 and forgotten about it. According to Bakshi, "I sold them a show they already owned, so they just gave me the rights for nothin'!"

Kricfalusi's team wrote story outlines for thirteen episodes in a week and pitched them to Price. By the next week, Kricfalusi had hired animators he knew who had been working at other studios. Mighty Mouse: The New Adventures went into production the month it was greenlighted; it was scheduled to premiere on September 19, 1987. This haste required the crew to be split into four teams, led by supervising director Kricfalusi, Fitzgerald, Steve Gordon and Bruce Woodside. Each team was given a handful of episodes, and operated almost entirely independently of the others. Although the scripts required approval by CBS executives, Kricfalusi insisted that the artists add visual gags as they drew. Bruce Timm, Andrew Stanton, Dave Marshall and Jeff Pidgeon were among the artists who worked on the series. Despite the time constraints, CBS was pleased with the way Bakshi Productions addressed the network's notes.

During the production of the episode "The Littlest Tramp", editor Tom Klein expressed concern that a sequence showing Mighty Mouse sniffing the remains of a crushed flower resembled cocaine use. Bakshi did not initially view the footage; he believed that Klein was overreacting, but agreed to let him cut the scene. Kricfalusi expressed disbelief over the cut, insisting that the action was harmless and that the sequence should be restored. Following Kricfalusi's advice, Bakshi told Klein to restore the scene, which had been approved by network executives and the CBS standards and practices department. The episode aired on October 31, 1987, without controversy.

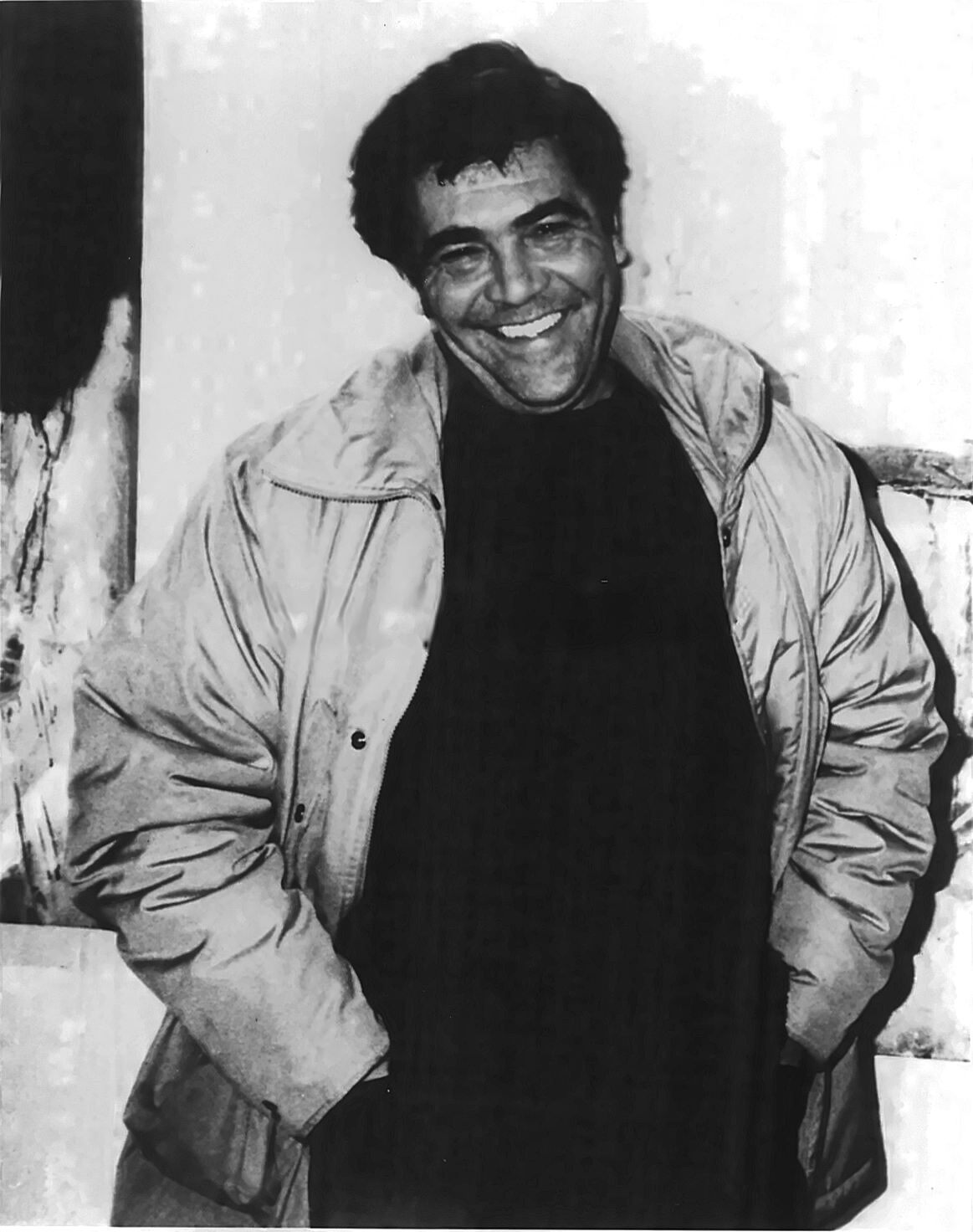
Bakshi in December 1987

In 1988, Bakshi received an Annie Award for "Distinguished Contribution to the Art of Animation". The same year, he began production on a series pilot loosely adapted from his Junktown comic strips. According to Bakshi, the proposed series "was going to be a revitalization of cartoon style from the '20s and '30s. It was gonna have Duke Ellington and Fats Waller jazzing up the soundtrack." Nickelodeon was initially willing to greenlight 39 episodes of Junktown.

On June 6, 1988, Donald Wildmon, head of the American Family Association (AFA), alleged that "The Littlest Tramp" depicted cocaine use, instigating a media frenzy. The AFA, during its incarnation as the National Federation for Decency, had previously targeted CBS as an "accessory to murder" after a mother killed her daughter following an airing of Exorcist II: The Heretic. Concerning Bakshi's involvement with Mighty Mouse: The New Adventures, the AFA claimed that CBS "intentionally hired a known pornographer to do a cartoon for children, and then allowed him to insert a scene in which the cartoon hero is shown sniffing cocaine." Bakshi responded, "You could pick a still out of Lady and the Tramp and get the same impression. Fritz the Cat wasn't pornography. It was social commentary. This all smacks of burning books and the Third Reich. It smacks of McCarthyism. I'm not going to get into who sniffs what. This is lunacy!" On CBS's order, Klein removed the sequence from the master broadcast footage. Wildmon claimed that the edits were "a de facto admission that, indeed, Mighty Mouse was snorting cocaine". Despite receiving an award from Action for Children's Television, favorable reviews, and a ranking in Time magazine's "Best of '87" feature, Mighty Mouse: The New Adventures was canceled by CBS following the controversy.

The incident had a ripple effect, weakening Nickelodeon's commitment to Junktown. Bakshi has also stated that "we were trying something different [...] but a series didn't make sense. It just didn't work". The series was scrapped, and the completed pilot aired as a special, Christmas in Tattertown, in December 1988. It was the first original animated special created for Nickelodeon. Bakshi moved into a warehouse loft in downtown Los Angeles to clear his head, and was offered $50,000 to direct a half-hour live-action film for PBS's Imagining America anthology series. Mark Bakshi produced the film, This Ain't Bebop, his first professional collaboration with his father. Bakshi wrote a poem influenced by Jack Kerouac, jazz, the Beat Generation and Brooklyn that served as the narration, which was spoken by Harvey Keitel. After a car crash, Bakshi completed the post-production in stitches and casts. Bakshi said of the work, "It's the most proud I've been of a picture since Coonskin—the last real thing I did with total integrity."

As a result of the film, Bakshi received an offer to adapt Dr. Seuss's The Butter Battle Book for TNT. Ted Geisel had never been satisfied with the previous screen versions of his Dr. Seuss work. Bakshi wanted to produce an entirely faithful adaptation, and Geisel—who agreed to storyboard the special himself—was pleased with the final product. Bakshi next directed the pilot Hound Town for NBC; he described the result as "an embarrassing piece of shit". Besides Bakshi, sitcom alumnus Rob Sternin and Prudence Fraser wrote and produced the project.

=== Cool World, continued television projects and semi-retirement (1990–1997) ===
In 1990, Bakshi pitched Cool World to Paramount Pictures as a partially animated horror film. The concept involved a cartoon and human having sex and conceiving a hybrid child who visits the real world to murder the father who abandoned him. The live-action footage was intended to look like "a living, walk-through painting", a visual concept Bakshi had long wanted to achieve. Massive sets were constructed on a sound stage in Las Vegas, based on enlargements of designer Barry Jackson's paintings. The animation was strongly influenced by the house styles of Fleischer Studios and Terrytoons. As the sets were being built, producer Frank Mancuso Jr., son of Paramount president Frank Mancuso Sr., had the screenplay rewritten in secret; the new version, by Michael Grais and Mark Victor, was radically different from Bakshi's original. Paramount threatened to sue Bakshi if he did not complete the film. As Bakshi and Mancuso wrangled over their creative differences, Bakshi and the studio also began to fight over the film's casting. To keep actor Brad Pitt, Bakshi had to replace Drew Barrymore, his original choice for the character of Holli Would, with Kim Basinger, a bigger box office draw at the time. The film's animators were never given a screenplay. Instead, they were told by Bakshi, to "Do a scene that's funny, whatever you want to do!"

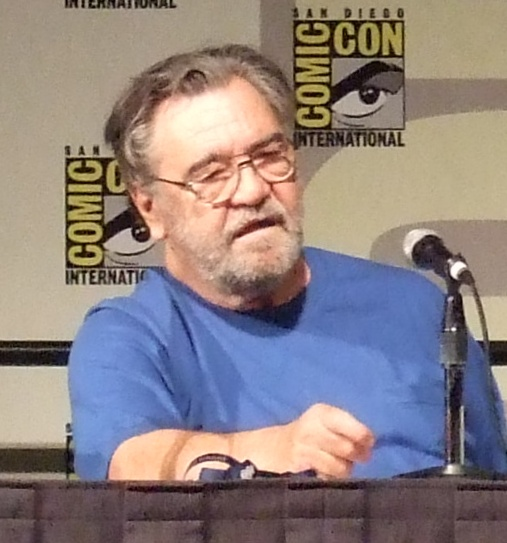
Bakshi speaking at San Diego Comic-Con on July 26, 2008

Designer Milton Knight recalled that "audiences actually wanted a wilder, raunchier Cool World. The premiere audience I saw it with certainly did." The critical reaction to the film was generally negative. Roger Ebert wrote, "The DJ who was hosting the radio station's free preview of Cool World leaped onto the stage and promised the audience: 'If you liked Roger Rabbit, you'll love Cool World!' He was wrong, but you can't blame him—he hadn't seen the movie. I have, and I will now promise you that if you liked Roger Rabbit, quit while you're ahead." The film was a box-office disappointment. While other film projects followed, Bakshi began to focus more attention on painting.

In 1993, Lou Arkoff, the son of Samuel Z. Arkoff, approached Bakshi to write and direct a low-budget live-action feature for Showtime's Rebel Highway series. For the third time, Bakshi revisited his screenplay for If I Catch Her, I'll Kill Her, which he retitled Cool and the Crazy. The picture, which aired September 16, 1994, starred Jared Leto, Alicia Silverstone, Jennifer Blanc and Matthew Flint. Reviewer Todd Everett noted that it had the same "hyperdrive visual sense" of Bakshi's animated films. He said, "Everything in 'Cool' [...] seems to exist in pastels and Bakshi shoots from more odd angles than any director since Sidney J. Furie in his heyday. And the closing sequences ably demonstrate how it's possible to present strong violence without any blood being shed onscreen. Bakshi pulls strong [performances] from a cadre of youngish and largely unknown actors".

In 1995, Hanna-Barbera producer Fred Seibert offered Bakshi the chance to create two animated short films for Cartoon Network's What a Cartoon!: Malcom and Melvin and Babe, He Calls Me, focusing on a trumpet-playing cockroach named Malcom and his best friend, a clown named Melvin. Both were heavily edited after Bakshi turned them in and he disowned them as a result. Bakshi was subsequently contacted by HBO, which was looking to launch the first animated series specifically for adults, an interest stirred by discussions involving a series based upon Trey Parker and Matt Stone's video Christmas card, Jesus vs. Santa. Bakshi enlisted a team of writers, including his son Preston, to develop Spicy Detective, later renamed Spicy City, an anthology series set in a noir-ish, technology-driven future. Each episode was narrated by a female host named Raven, voiced by Michelle Phillips. The series premiered in July 1997—one month before the debut of Parker and Stone's South Park—and thus became the first "adults only" cartoon series. Although critical reaction was largely unfavorable, Spicy City received acceptable ratings. A second season was approved, but the network wanted to fire Bakshi's writing team and hire professional Los Angeles screenwriters. When Bakshi refused to cooperate, the series was canceled.

=== Painting, teaching and final animation projects (1997–2015) ===
Bakshi retired from animation once more, returning to his painting. In 2000, he began teaching an undergraduate animation class at New York's School of Visual Arts. On December 14, 2001, he did some paintings for the Cameron Crowe film Vanilla Sky. He later became involved in several screen projects, including a development deal with the Sci Fi Channel, In September 2002, Bakshi, Liz and their dogs moved to New Mexico, where he became more productive than ever in his painting and began development on the Last Days of Coney Island film. In 2003, he appeared as the Fire Chief in the episode "Fire Dogs 2" of John Kricfalusi's Ren & Stimpy "Adult Party Cartoon"; the episode starts as a repeat of the plot of the original episode, only to quickly drop it just under a minute in, as the Chief's appearance suddenly transforms into that of Bakshi and the episode instead revolves around the pair living with the Chief.

In September 2008, Main Street Pictures announced that it would collaborate with Bakshi on a sequel to Wizards. In 2012, Bakshi began producing the short film series Bakshi Blues. The first of these shorts, Trickle Dickle Down, contains reused animation from Coonskin and criticizes 2012 Republican presidential candidate Mitt Romney. The shorts were to focus on "old and new characters" and comment on modern-day America.

In February 2013, Bakshi launched a successful Kickstarter campaign to obtain funding for his latest film, Last Days of Coney Island. Actor Matthew Modine was cast in the film in February 2013 after Modine, a longtime Bakshi fan, came across the film's Kickstarter campaign online. Last Days of Coney Island was released on Vimeo in 2015. Bakshi released the film for free on YouTube on 13 October 2016.

=== Post-animation (2016–present) ===
After he quit the animation industry, Bakshi did multiple interviews with the media and on podcasts. He continues to sell art on eBay and his website, both run by the Bakshi family. He currently sells an art series called Little Guys and Gals, which are fictional portraits of cartoon people. The series originated in November 2020 as random character sketches and officially began in January 2021, originally calling the series Little Gals and Little Guys. Bakshi appeared as a guest at a Canadian film festival which celebrates animation, SPARK Animation, which was held virtually, from October 28 to November 7, 2021.

== Accolades ==
In 2003 Bakshi received a Maverick Tribute Award at the Cinequest San Jose Film Festival; the same year he began teaching an animation class in New Mexico—this became The Bakshi School of Animation and Cartooning, which is run by Ralph's son Edward and his partner Jess Gorell.

The Online Film Critics Society released a list of the "Top 100 Animated Features of All Time" in March 2003 that included four of Bakshi's films: Fritz the Cat, The Lord of the Rings, Coonskin and Fire and Ice. Fritz the Cat was ranked number 56 in the 2004 poll conducted by Britain's Channel 4 for its documentary The 100 Greatest Cartoons. The Museum of Modern Art has added Bakshi's films to its collection for preservation.

In the 1980s and 1990s he served on the advisory board of the Los Angeles Student Film Institute.

In 2021, Ralph Bakshi won the Animafest Zagreb Lifetime Achievement Award for his animation career and the impact of his films.

== Legacy ==
The availability of Bakshi's work on the Internet sparked a resurgence of interest in his career, resulting in a three-day American Cinematheque retrospective held at Grauman's Egyptian Theatre in Hollywood and the Aero Theater in Santa Monica, California, in April 2005. Unfiltered: The Complete Ralph Bakshi, a hardcover book of Bakshi's art, was released on April 1, 2008. The foreword was written by Quentin Tarantino and the afterword by Bakshi. His rotoscoping techniques in Lord of the Rings inspired the animation rotoscoping techniques of the independent film The Spine of Night, in which the animator developed his own rotoscope style by watching behind-the-scenes footage of Bakshi's warehouse and reverse-engineering it. Billie Eilish had the idea for an animated version of herself for her in the concert film Happier Than Ever: A Love Letter to Los Angeles (which is a promotion for the album of the same name) and suggested to director Patrick Osborne that the character should have a 1980s look and rotoscope-ish animation. Eilish referenced the works of Bakshi and animator Richard Williams to him.

Gore Verbinski commented about Bakshi and showed that he was inspired by him during an interview in The Hollywood Reporter for his first animated movie, Rango, saying: "What happened to the Ralph Bakshis of the world? We're all sitting here talking family entertainment. Does animation have to be family entertainment? Audiences want something new; they just can't articulate what."

On January 12, 2014, at The Egyptian Theatre in Hollywood, there was a special screening of Bakshi's film American Pop with actors Ron Thompson and Mews Small in attendance, it was the first time lead actor Ron Thompson had ever introduced the film before a live audience.

At the Aero Theatre in Santa Monica, California, on March 27, 2015, there was a screening of Heavy Traffic and American Pop with Bakshi, Ron Thompson and Mews Small attending. From February 17 to 26, 2023, Bakshi's entire theatrical filmography was screened in Tinker Street Cinema, in Woodstock, New York.

Fritz the Cat has also been called an animated art film.

== Filmography ==
=== Films ===
Year	Film	Director	Writer	Producer	Actor	Role	Notes
1972	Fritz the Cat	Yes	Yes	No	Yes	Pig Cop No. 1	
1973	Heavy Traffic	Yes	Yes	No	Yes	Various	
1975	Coonskin	Yes	Yes	No	Yes	Cop with megaphone	
1977	Wizards	Yes	Yes	Yes	Yes	Fritz; Storm Trooper	
1978	The Lord of the Rings	Yes	No	No	No		
1981	American Pop	Yes	No	Yes	Yes	Piano Player	
1981	Bakshi's Fables: The Cigarette and the Weed	Yes	Yes	Yes	No		Short film
1982	Hey Good Lookin'	Yes	Yes	Yes	No		
1983	Fire and Ice	Yes	No	Yes	No		
1992	Cool World	Yes	No	No	No		
2012	Trickle Dickle Down	Yes	Yes	Yes	No		Short film
2015	Last Days of Coney Island	Yes	Yes	Yes	No		Short film Also animator and background artist
2023	Midwest	Yes	Yes	Yes	Yes	Himself	Short film Also cinematographer, editor, and artist

=== Television ===
Year	Title	Director	Writer	Producer	Animator	Voice	Role	Notes
1959	Hector Heathcote	Yes	Yes	No	No	No		Creator
1960	Mighty Mouse	No	No	No	Yes	No		Animator for "The Mysterious Package"
1962	The Adventures of Lariat Sam^{[I]}	Yes	No	No	Yes	No		
1964	Deputy Dawg^{[I]}	Yes	No	No	Yes	No		
1965	Sad Cat^{[I]}	Yes	Yes	No	No	No		Creator
1966–1967	James Hound	Yes	Yes	No	No	No		Creator
1966–1967	The Mighty Heroes	Yes	Yes	No	No	No		Creator
1968	Rocket Robin Hood	Yes	Yes	Executive	No	No		
1968–1970	Spider-Man^{[I]}	Yes	Yes	Executive	No	No		
1987–1988	Mighty Mouse: The New Adventures^{[I]}	Yes	Yes	Yes	No	No		Creator
1988	Christmas in Tattertown	Yes	Yes	Yes	No	No		Television special
1989	This Ain't Bebop	Yes	Yes	Yes	No	No		Television short
1989	The Butter Battle Book	Yes	No	Yes	No	No		Television special
1989	Hound Town	Yes	No	Executive	No	No		Pilot
1994	Cool and the Crazy	Yes	Yes	Yes	No	No		Television film
1997	Malcom and Melvin^{[III]}	Yes	Yes	Yes	Yes	Yes	Super Hero	Television short
1997	Babe, He Calls Me^{[III]}	Yes	Yes	Yes	Yes	Yes	Super Hero	Television short
1997	Spicy City^{[I]}^{[II]}	Yes	No	Yes	No	Yes	Stevie / Connelly / Goldblum	Creator
2003	Ren & Stimpy "Adult Party Cartoon"	No	No	No	No	Yes	Fire Chief	Episode: "Fire Dogs 2"

I Selected episodes
II Provided the voices of Connelly and Goldblum in the episode "Sex Drive", and Stevie in the episode "Mano's Hands"
III Animated in conjunction with Doug Compton

== Releases and ratings ==
Title	Release date	Distribution	Rating
Fritz the Cat	April 12, 1972	Cinemation Industries	X (rating surrendered in 2001)
Heavy Traffic	August 8, 1973	American International Pictures	X (re-rated R)
Coonskin	August 20, 1975	Bryanston Distributing Company	R
Wizards	February 9, 1977	20th Century Fox	PG
The Lord of the Rings	November 15, 1978	United Artists	PG
American Pop	February 13, 1981	Columbia Pictures	R
Hey Good Lookin'	October 1, 1982	Warner Bros. Pictures	R
Fire and Ice	August 26, 1983	20th Century Fox	PG
Cool World	July 10, 1992	Paramount Pictures	PG-13

== Bibliography ==
- Victoria Bakshi Yudis, Ralph Bakshi: Book 1 – A Private selection of drawings released from the Bakshi Archives. 2018–2019 (2019) ISBN 9780464546948
- Victoria Bakshi Yudis, Ralph Bakshi: Book 2 – No Rhyme or Reason (2020) ISBN 9781714319084
- Beck, Jerry (2005). The Animated Movie Guide. Chicago Review Press. ISBN 978-1-55652-591-9.
- Cohen, Karl F (1997). Forbidden Animation: Censored Cartoons and Blacklisted Animators in America. North Carolina: McFarland & Company, Inc. ISBN 0-7864-0395-0.
- Gibson, Jon M.; McDonnell, Chris (2008). Unfiltered: The Complete Ralph Bakshi. Universe Publishing. ISBN 978-0-7893-1684-4.
- Grant, John (2001). Masters of Animation. Watson-Guptill. ISBN 0-8230-3041-5.

== See also ==
- Lee Hardcastle
- Heavy Metal
- Independent animation
- John Kricfalusi
- New Hollywood
- Katsuhiro Otomo
- Rock & Rule
- Ron Thompson
