= Rebel Highway =

- Genre: Drama, action
- Created by: Lou Arkoff; Debra Hill
- Country of origin: United States
- Original language: English

Production
- Producers: Lou Arkoff; Debra Hill
- Production company: Dimension Television

Original release
- Network: Showtime
- Release: July 22 – September 23, 1994

Rebel Highway was a revival of American International Pictures created and produced by Lou Arkoff, the son of Samuel Z. Arkoff, and Debra Hill for the Showtime network in 1994.

== Concept ==
The concept was a 10-week series of 1950s "drive-in classic" B-movies remade "with a '90s edge". The impetus for the series, according to Arkoff was, "what it would be like if you made Rebel Without a Cause today. It would be more lurid, sexier, and much more dangerous, and you definitely would have had Natalie Wood's top off".

Arkoff originally wanted to call the series Raging Hormones, but Showtime decided on Rebel Highway instead.

== Development ==
Arkoff and Hill invited several directors to pick a title from one of Samuel Arkoff's films, hire their own writers and create a story that could resemble the original if they wanted. In addition, they had the right to a final cut and to select their own director of photography and the editor.

Each director was given a $1.3 million budget and 12 days to shoot it with a cast of young, up and coming actors and actresses. According to Arkoff, the appeal to directors was that, "They weren't hampered by big studios saying, 'You can't do this or that.' And all the directors paid very close attention to the detail of the era. We want these shows to be fun for the younger generation and fun for the older generation".

The series premiered with Robert Rodriguez's Roadracers on July 22, 1994.

== Films ==
Title	Release	Written by	Directed by	Starring
Roadracers	July 22, 1994	Robert Rodriguez and Tommy Nix	Robert Rodriguez	David Arquette and Salma Hayek.
Confessions of a Sorority Girl	July 29, 1994	Debra Hill and Gigi Vorgan	Uli Edel	Jamie Luner, Brian Bloom and Alyssa Milano.
Motorcycle Gang	August 5, 1994	Laurie McQuillan and Kent Anderson	John Milius	Gerald McRaney, Carla Gugino, and Jake Busey.
Runaway Daughters	August 12, 1994	Lou Rusoff and Charles S. Haas	Joe Dante	Julie Bowen and Paul Rudd.
Girls in Prison	August 19, 1994	Samuel Fuller and Christa Lang	John McNaughton	Anne Heche, Jon Polito and Ione Skye.
Shake, Rattle and Rock!	August 26, 1994	Trish Soodik	Allan Arkush	Renée Zellweger and Howie Mandel.
Dragstrip Girl	September 2, 1994	Jerome Gary	Mary Lambert	Mark Dacascos, Traci Lords, Raymond Cruz and Natasha Gregson Wagner.
Jailbreakers	September 9, 1994	Debra Hill and Gigi Vorgan	William Friedkin	Antonio Sabato Jr., Adrien Brody and Shannen Doherty.
Cool and the Crazy	September 16, 1994	Ralph Bakshi	Ralph Bakshi	Jared Leto and Alicia Silverstone.
Reform School Girl	September 23, 1994	Edward Bernds and Bruce Meade	Jonathan Kaplan	Aimee Graham and Matt LeBlanc.

== Soundtrack ==
The soundtrack featured contemporary artists covering classic songs from the 1950s.

== Reception ==
In his review for Entertainment Weekly, Ken Tucker wrote, "It is the whimsical notion behind the Rebel Highway series to take a group of mostly grade-D exploitation films from the '50s and remake them, with good actors and directors, in the '90s". In his review for the Chicago Reader, Jonathan Rosenbaum wrote that the series "is at best a collection of offbeat so-called B-films, though given the state of American movies at the moment this is a much more sizable achievement than it might at first appear–especially considering that the whole system that once supported B-films no longer exists".
