= Earth vs. the Spider (2001 film) =

2001 television film by Scott Ziehl

- DVD Cover Art
- Story by: Mark "Crash" McCreery; Cary Solomon; Chuck Konzelman
- Directed by: Scott Ziehl
- Starring: Dan Aykroyd; Amelia Heinle; Devon Gummersall; Christopher Cousins; Mario Roccuzzo; John Cho; Theresa Russell
- Music by: David Reynolds
- Country of origin: United States
- Original language: English

Production
- Producers: Lou Arkoff; Samuel Z. Arkoff
- Cinematography: Thomas L. Callaway
- Running time: 90 minutes
- Production companies: Columbia Tristar Home Video; Creature Features Productions LLC

Original release
- Network: Cinemax
- Release: October 7, 2001

Earth vs. the Spider is a 2001 science fiction horror television film directed by Scott Ziehl. It is the second of a series of films made for Cinemax paying tribute to the films of American International Pictures. The films in this tribute series reused the titles of old American International Pictures films, in this case the 1958 Bert I. Gordon film Earth vs. the Spider, but are not remakes of the earlier films. The film centers on a shy, obsessive comic book fan who gets injected with an experimental serum derived from spiders, which gives him minor superpowers. More horrific changes occur, slowly transforming him into a grotesque human spider hybrid. A detective begins to investigate when bodies start to pile up covered in cobwebs. The film was nominated for the Saturn Award at the Academy of Science Fiction, Fantasy, and Horror Films, USA.

== Plot ==
Quentin Kemmer is a shy security guard and obsessive comic book fan who dreams of becoming a superhero like his favorite comic book character, the Arachnid Avenger, and going out with his next-door neighbor Stephanie Lewis. When his partner is killed during a botched robbery at the research laboratory where he works, Quentin is fired, and in a moment of grief, he injects himself with an experimental serum derived from spiders. The next day, he is wracked with a severe fever and spends most of the day unconscious. After he recovers, he discovers that he has developed increased strength.

Later that night, Stephanie is attacked and almost raped by a stalker. Quentin intervenes and kills the man, leaving before Stephanie can see him. Quentin later returns to his apartment and finds Stephanie being interviewed by Detective Frank Grillo in hopes of identifying her savior. Quentin is thrilled that he is finally able to live his dream of becoming a superhero. However, as the days go by, he develops more spider-like abilities, including being able to shoot webs from his abdomen, and his body becoming more spider-like. Quentin is also overwhelmed with an insatiable hunger, but is unable to eat solid food. Arriving at a local store in an effort to find something to satisfy his hunger, he happens upon a man attempting to rape a young woman and attacks him, severely injuring the man. Expecting the woman to be grateful, he is surprised when she yells at him in anger as the man was her boyfriend. When she attempts to call the police, Quentin encases her in webbing. Police Officer Williams arrives on the scene and attempts to free the woman but is attacked by Quentin.

The next day, the police converge on the store and find the man's body, which has been sucked dry of all fluids, and the woman in a state of shock. Detective Grillo is confused by the state of the man's body and by the presence of what appears to be spider webs at the scene as well as Williams's badge, as Williams's body is missing. Horrified at what he is becoming as his body mutates even further, and afraid of hurting anyone else, Quentin holes himself up in his room in an effort to prevent any more murders.

The next night, Quentin is overwhelmed by hunger and ventures out, murdering two young men who used to pick on him. Trying to get to the bottom of the murders, Frank interviews the head of the research department where Quentin used to work. He discovers that scientists were working on a way to transfer properties from spiders into humans. Now realizing that the killer might have injected himself with the lab's serum, and theorizing that Quentin might be the killer, Frank visits Quentin's apartment but finds no one apparently home. After discovering the same webbing found at the store, Frank enters the apartment's basement where he discovers dozens of bodies encased in webbing. Frank's wife Trixie has followed him, believing he is hiding Officer Williams, with whom she was having an affair, but Trixie is attacked by Quentin. Frank attempts to rescue her, but arrives too late and she dies in his arms.

Entering the apartment, Quentin kidnaps Stephanie and takes her to an abandoned building nearby. Frank arrives at the building and finds Stephanie strung up in a large spider's web. Quentin, now a grotesque mixture of man and spider, appears and begs Frank to kill him. Frank at first refuses, but the animal side of Quentin takes over and he lunges at Stephanie, forcing Frank to open fire on him. Stephanie thanks Quentin for saving her before he dies.

Later, Quentin's friend Han introduces a comic book collector to an action figure that resembles his friend, now a superhero named Quentin Arachnid.

== Cast ==
- Dan Aykroyd as Det. Insp. Frank Grillo
- Devon Gummersall as Quentin Kemmer
- Amelia Heinle as Stephanie Lewis
- Theresa Russell as Trixie Grillo
- Christopher Cousins as Officer Williams
- John Cho as Han
- Randall Huber as Midtown murderer
- Greg Harris as Gutterpunk #1 (as Zia)
- Lloyd Lowe Jr. as Lloyd (gutterpunk #2) (as Lloyd Lowe)
- Michael Keenan as Willie
- Ted Rooney as Coroner
- Dan Martin as Huge cop
- Rob Hill as Liquor store cop
- Pedro Pascal as Goth Guy

== Production ==
B-films are what got me into the business, [and] I have a great deal of love for the movies of the Fifties and have really enjoyed bringing them to a new audience.

— Series producer and special-effects artist Stan Winston on creating the series.

Earth vs. the Spider was the first film in a series of made-for-TV film remakes produced by special effects artist Stan Winston, Colleen Camp and Samuel Z. Arkoff's son, Lou Arkoff. the first series to be produced by Winston's newly formed production company Stan Winston Productions and released by Cinemax. The film's script, like the others in the series, differed significantly from the original film, which was about a town plagued by a giant spider. The film is about a young man whose attempt to become a Spider-Man type superhero goes wrong, leaving him with a Jekyll-and-Hyde type personality disorder. Co-creator Stan Winston stated that he planned to release a series of action figures based on the first five characters in the series, including one based on the Quentin Arachnid creature.

== Release ==
Earth vs. the Spider premiered on Cinemax television on October 7, 2001, making it the first in the series. Columbia TriStar released the film on DVD on July 6, 2004 and on May 7 that same year.

== Reception ==
Earth vs. the Spider received mixed to negative reviews from critics, with many perceiving it as derivative of David Cronenberg's The Fly.

TV Guide awarded the film 2/4 stars, criticizing Gummersall's performance and the special effects, calling them "goofy". Steve Van Pelt from Film Threat gave the film 1/4 stars, characterizing it as a mockbuster which blatantly rips off the Spider-Man origin story in an attempt to cash in on publicity for the upcoming Spider-Man film. G. Noel Gross from DVD Talk rated the film two and a half out of five stars, criticizing the slow start, uneven execution, and the irrelevance of Aykroyd's character.

Rich Rosell from Digitally Obsessed.com awarded the film a grade C. Rosell praised the film's special effects that transformed actor Devon Gummersall into a human spider but complained about the film's dull story, commenting, "Stan Winston's Creature Features series is tied at 1-1, with this weak entry balanced against the entertaining initial release of She Creature. The story here is shamefully weak, and seems to borrow handily from The Fly for most of its intended, but poorly executed, dramatic tension. The campy superhero parallels mostly fall flat." Movie-gazette.com gave the film 3/10 stars, calling it "A bizarre mix of comic book camp and The Fly-style horror." Mick Martin and Marsha Porter in their DVD and Video Guide gave the film 3 out of 4 stars, complimenting the special effects and performances. Felix Vasquez from Cinema Crazed.com called it "a fun guilty pleasure", commending the film's make-up and special effects, Gummersall and Cho's performances, and Ziehl's direction. However, Vasquez felt that Aykroyd's inclusion in the film felt "tacked on".
