= Girls in Prison =

Girls in Prison may refer to:

- Girls in Prison (1956 film), a drama/sexploitation women in prison film
- Girls in Prison (1994 film), an American television film
