= Debra Hill =

American film producer (1950–2005)

- Born: November 10, 1950; Philadelphia, Pennsylvania, U.S.
- Died: March 7, 2005 (aged 54); Los Angeles, California, U.S.
- Occupations: Film producer, screenwriter
- Years active: 1972–2005

Debra Hill (November 10, 1950 – March 7, 2005) was an American film producer and screenwriter, best known for her films co-created with John Carpenter.

Hill and Carpenter wrote four films together: Halloween, The Fog, Halloween II, and Escape from L.A. Independently and as part of Hill/Obst Productions she produced works for television and film, including The Fisher King, which was nominated for five Academy Awards.

== Early life ==
Debra Hill was born on November 10, 1950, in Philadelphia, Pennsylvania to Jilda, a nurse, and Frank Hill, a salesman who had previously been an art director on the Hope/Crosby Road to films. She was raised Catholic and moved repeatedly with her parents and younger brother, including to Detroit, Michigan, before settling in Haddonfield, New Jersey.

In an interview with the Courier-Post, Hill said she knew at an early age that she wanted to make films, using a Super 8 film camera to shoot home movies. The first movie she remembered seeing was a horror film, inspiring her future work. Hill attended Haddonfield Memorial High School, graduating in 1968.

She graduated from Temple University with degrees in sociology and statistics and moved to New York, where she found work editing documentaries. She briefly worked as a flight attendant and did press for Evel Knievel's attempt to jump the Snake River Canyon, before moving to California.

== Career ==
Hill (left) with John Carpenter (center) and Larry Franco (right) in 1981.

In 1975, Hill started as a production assistant and progressed through jobs as a script supervisor, assistant director and second unit director. Her first film credit was as a script supervisor on Goodbye, Norma Jean. Hill first worked with John Carpenter in 1975, as the script supervisor and assistant editor of Assault on Precinct 13. This led not only to further professional collaborations between Hill and Carpenter, but also marked the beginning of their personal relationship.

In 1978, Hill and Carpenter co-wrote the horror movie Halloween. The movie's fictional setting of Haddonfield was named after her home town of Haddonfield, New Jersey. Hill primarily wrote the plot about Laurie Strode while Carpenter wrote the Sam Loomis arc; the two storylines were then blended. She also cast Jamie Lee Curtis as Laurie Strode, which became the beginning of a lifelong friendship. During production, Hill served as producer, second unit coordinator and had a brief cameo early in the film—the first person perspective shots of a young Michael Myers’ hands are actually Hill's. Halloween was a commercial and critical success, earning the duo a two-picture deal with Avco Embassy Pictures.

Following Halloween's success, Hill and Carpenter co-wrote The Fog (1980), again starring Jamie Lee Curtis, as well as Janet Leigh, John Houseman, Hal Holbrook, and Carpenter's then wife, Adrienne Barbeau. Hill produced the film and did some second unit shooting while Carpenter again directed. Hill and Carpenter next worked together to co-write and produce Halloween II (1981) and produced Halloween III: Season of the Witch (1982). Their other credits together include: Escape from New York (1981), its sequel, Escape from L.A. (1996), and the 1990 HBO film, El Diablo. While Hill and Carpenter had plans to produce and direct El Diablo as early as 1979, it was not made until a decade later.

Citing a desire to move away from horror, Hill began producing suspense and comedy films. Independently, she produced The Dead Zone (1983), Head Office (1985), and Clue (1985). In 1986, she formed an independent production company with her friend Lynda Obst. Together, they produced Adventures in Babysitting, Heartbreak Hotel, and The Fisher King. In 1988, she entered a contract with Walt Disney Pictures under which she produced Gross Anatomy, short films for the Walt Disney theme park, and an NBC special for Disneyland's 35th anniversary.

Hill recalled the transition over the course of her career from being called "sweetheart" and "darling" in her early years as a producer to the respectful "ma'am" many years later on the DVD commentary for Escape From New York with production designer Joe Alves. In 2003, she was honored by Women in Film with the Crystal Award. In her acceptance speech, Hill said, “I want every producer, studio executive, and agent in this room to include me in their directors list, along with the women who have come before me and the women directors who will come after me.”

Hill was noted for supporting emerging talent in the film industry, and a number of Hill's associates went on to later success in film. For example, James Cameron, the filmmaker, once worked for Hill in the visual effects department. Jeffrey Chernov was Hill's second assistant director and went on to become an executive producer of Black Panther. As a producer, Hill produced the directorial debut works of Christopher Columbus, Antonio Banderas, and Jonathan Lynn. Producers Stacey Sher, Gale Anne Hurd, and KNB EFX Group have all credited Hill with helping to establish their careers.

Additional contributions to the film industry included serving on the jury at the Sundance Film Festival and on the executive producer committee for the Academy of Motion Pictures, Arts and Sciences. Friends and colleagues commented that Hill became frustrated with the film industry in that the industry did not welcome more women as directors.

== Personal life ==
Hill was diagnosed with colon cancer in February 2004. Despite her diagnosis and eventual amputation of her legs, Hill continued to work on several projects. She worked with John Carpenter and actor Kurt Russell on a comic adaptation of the Snake Plissken character, as well as a proposed Snake Plissken video game.

== Death ==
In 2005, Hill reunited with Carpenter to produce the remake of The Fog and was working on the Oliver Stone film World Trade Center when she died of cancer on March 7, 2005. After her death, Carpenter told the Associated Press that working with Hill was "one of the greatest experiences of my life – she had a passion for not just movies about women or women's ideas but films for everybody".

== Legacy ==
The Producers Guild of America established the Debra Hill Fellowship in 2005 to support emerging producers in recognition of Hill's contributions. In 2023, production began on a documentary about Hill's life and career, titled Hollywood Trailblazer: The Debra Hill Story.

== Filmography ==
=== Films ===
Year	Title	Producer	Writer	Director	Notes
1978	Halloween	Yes	Yes	John Carpenter	Cameo
1980	The Fog	Yes	Yes	John Carpenter	Cameo
1981	Escape from New York	Yes	No	John Carpenter	Voice cameo
1981	Halloween II	Yes	Yes	Rick Rosenthal	
1982	Halloween III: Season of the Witch	Yes	No	Tommy Lee Wallace	
1983	The Dead Zone	Yes	No	David Cronenberg	
1985	Clue	Yes	No	Jonathan Lynn	
1985	Head Office	Yes	No	Ken Finkleman	
1987	Adventures in Babysitting	Yes	No	Chris Columbus	
1988	Big Top Pee-wee	Yes	No	Randal Kleiser	
1988	Heartbreak Hotel	Yes	No	Chris Columbus	
1989	The Lottery	Yes	No	Garry Marshall	Short film
1989	Gross Anatomy	Yes	No	Thom Eberhardt	
1991	The Fisher King	Yes	No	Terry Gilliam	
1996	Escape from L.A.	Executive	Yes	John Carpenter	
1998	Chow Bella	Executive	No	Gavin Grazer	
1999	Crazy in Alabama	Yes	No	Antonio Banderas	
2005	The Fog	Yes	No	Rupert Wainwright	Posthumous release
2006	World Trade Center	Yes	No	Oliver Stone	Posthumous release

Other credits
Year	Title	Role	Notes
1976	Goodbye, Norma Jean	Script supervisor, uncredited writing contributions	
1976	Assault on Precinct 13	Script supervisor / assistant editor	
1977	Satan's Cheerleaders	Script supervisor	
1977	Bare Knuckles	Script supervisor	
1977	Charge of the Model T's	Production assistant / second assistant director	
1978	Hi-Riders	Script supervisor	
1978	Goodbye, Franklin High	Script supervisor	
1978	Hanging on a Star	Script supervisor	
1998	The Replacement Killers	"Special Thanks To"	
2002	Tales from the Mist: Inside 'The Fog'	Archival material	Documentary short

=== Television ===
Year	Title	Director	Producer	Writer	Notes
1989	Adventures in Babysitting	No	Executive	No	Unsold pilot
1990	The Magic World of Disney	No	Executive	No	Episode: "Disneyland's 35th Anniversary Celebration"
1990	Monsters	Yes	No	No	Episode: "Far Below"
1990	El Diablo	No	Executive	No	Television film for HBO
1993	Dream On	Yes	No	No	Episode: "Home Sweet Homeboy"
1993	Attack of the 50 Ft. Woman	No	Yes	No	Television film
1994	Roadracers	No	Yes	No	Television film on Showtime, part of the Rebel Highway series
1994	Confessions of a Sorority Girl	No	Yes	Yes	Television film on Showtime, part of the Rebel Highway series
1994	Motorcycle Gang	No	Yes	No	Television film on Showtime, part of the Rebel Highway series
1994	Runaway Daughters	No	Yes	No	Television film on Showtime, part of the Rebel Highway series
1994	Girls in Prison	No	Yes	No	Television film on Showtime, part of the Rebel Highway series
1994	Shake, Rattle and Rock!	No	Yes	No	Television film on Showtime, part of the Rebel Highway series
1994	Dragstrip Girl	No	Yes	No	Television film on Showtime, part of the Rebel Highway series
1994	Jailbreakers	No	Yes	Yes	Television film on Showtime, part of the Rebel Highway series
1994	Cool and the Crazy	No	Yes	No	Television film on Showtime, part of the Rebel Highway series
1994	Reform School Girl	No	Yes	No	Television film on Showtime, part of the Rebel Highway series

Other credits
Year	Title	Role	Notes
1972	The Streets of San Francisco	Script supervisor	Unknown episodes
1977	Father Knows Best: Home for Christmas	Script supervisor	Television film
2003	'Halloween': A Cut Above the Rest	Still photographer	Television documentary film
