= Cool and the Crazy =

1994 television film by Ralph Bakshi

- DVD cover
- Genre: Drama
- Written by: Ralph Bakshi
- Directed by: Ralph Bakshi
- Starring: Jared Leto; Alicia Silverstone; Jennifer Blanc; Matthew Flint
- Music by: Hummie Mann
- Country of origin: United States
- Original language: English

Production
- Producers: Lou Arkoff; Debra Hill; Willie Kutner
- Production locations: Los Angeles; Venice, California
- Cinematography: Roberto Schaefer
- Editor: Larry Bock
- Running time: 84 minutes
- Production companies: American International Pictures; Dimension Films

Original release
- Network: Showtime
- Release: September 16, 1994

Cool and the Crazy is a 1994 American made-for-television drama film written and directed by Ralph Bakshi and starring Jared Leto and Alicia Silverstone. The story revolves around an unhappily married couple in the late 1950s who both lead separate affairs. The film was Bakshi's first feature-length live-action film, being primarily known as a director of animated films which heavily utilize live-action sequences, such as Fritz the Cat, Heavy Traffic, Wizards, American Pop and The Lord of the Rings.

Cool and the Crazy first aired on the cable television network Showtime on September 16, 1994, as part of the series Rebel Highway.

== Plot ==
High school sweethearts Michael and Roslyn happily marry during the 1950s, both 18. Things go along smoothly until Roslyn gets pregnant, at age 19. The bills pile up and the two grow apart from each other. Roslyn spends most of the time taking care of their child and hanging out with her best friend, Joannie, who is married to a guy named Bobby. Joannie has been cheating on her husband with a man named Frankie.

Roslyn is introduced to Frankie's friend, Joey, a bad boy who is also married. Immediately, Roslyn begins an affair with Joey. At first Michael doesn't suspect anything, but when the two girlfriends go out at night and come back later and later, it dawns on him that they are both having affairs. Michael works at a design company with Lorraine, who is into the Beat and jazz scenes. One night, he goes out to have an affair with her. The next morning, however, his uptight attitudes causes him to back out of the affair when he learns that he's not her only lover. Eventually Lorraine leaves to go to New York City. At the same time, Roslyn's trying to break off her affair with Joey, but he won't give up that easily. Varied events soon escalate in violence. Joey kidnaps Roslyn, and Michael goes after them, and takes his wife back from him. Michael and Roslyn go their separate ways, and Michael hits the road.

Joey, Frankie, and Crazy

== Cast ==
- Jared Leto as Michael, Roslyn's husband and the father of Michael Jr. He lives unhappily in his marriage as he feels that Roslyn is pushing him away.
- Alicia Silverstone as Roslyn, Michael's wife and the mother of Michael Jr. She feels alone at home taking care of the house and the baby, big when Joey comes along, he shows her the world of being free and shows her more fun types of sex.
- Jennifer Blanc as Joannie, Roslyn's best friend who has an affair before Roslyn does.
- Matthew Flint as Joey, Roslyn's secret boyfriend and sex buddy.
- Bradford Tatum as Frankie, Joannie's unhappy husband.
- Christine Harnos as Lorraine, Michael's co-worker who he too has an affair with.
- Richard Singer as Neal
- Tuesday Knight as Brenda
- Christian Frizzell as Bobby
- John Hawkes as "Crazy"

== Production ==
Roslyn, Joannie, Michael, and Bobby

Ralph Bakshi began developing Cool and the Crazy in the late 1960s under the title If I Catch Her, I'll Kill Her. United Artists and Paramount Pictures each paid Bakshi to develop the film in the 1970s, but were unwilling to produce it, as were the studios Bakshi pitched the film to in the 1980s. According to Bakshi, "They thought that no one was going to admit that women can—and do—cheat on their husbands. They thought it was too hot, which made no sense."

In 1993, producer Lou Arkoff approached Bakshi to write and direct a low-budget feature for Showtime's Rebel Highway series. For the third time, Bakshi revisited his screenplay for If I Catch Her, I'll Kill Her, and retitled the film Cool and the Crazy. The title comes from a 1958 exploitation film released by American International Pictures, but its plot bore no relation to the earlier film.

== Reception ==
Variety reviewer Todd Everett wrote "the hyperdrive visual sense for which Bakshi's animated features have been noted. Everything in "Cool" [...] seems to exist in pastels and Bakshi shoots from more odd angles than any director since Sidney J. Furie in his heyday. And the closing sequences ably demonstrate how it's possible to present strong violence without any blood being shed onscreen. Bakshi pulls strong perfs from a cadre of youngish and largely unknown actors".
