= Lou Arkoff =

American film producer

Louis S. Arkoff is an American film producer; he is the son of executive producer Samuel Z. Arkoff and brother to film producer, Donna Arkoff Roth.

Arkoff studied cinema at University of Southern California and law at Loyola University. In 1973 he joined AIP as a legal administrator. He worked his way up to be an executive and became vice president of the company in 1975.

Among his credits are several made-for-cable movies which were remakes of his father's films in the early 1990s.

== Select credits ==
=== Film work ===
Year	Title	Role	Production company
1975	Return to Macon County		
1976	A Small Town in Texas	Executive Producer	American International Pictures
1978	Our Winning Season	Executive in charge of production	
1979	California Dreaming	Executive Producer	Orion Pictures
1980	Gorp	Producer	American International Pictures
1982	Lookin' to Get Out		
1984	Up The Creek	Executive Producer	
1985	Hellhole	Co-producer	Columbia Pictures
1997	Gone Fishin'	Co-producer	Buena Vista Pictures
1997	George of the Jungle	Co-producer	Buena Vista Pictures
1999	The 13th Warrior	Co-producer	Buena Vista Pictures
1999	Inspector Gadget	Co-producer	Buena Vista Pictures
2003	Darkness Falls	Executive Producer	
2005	Cursed	Creative consultant	

=== Television work ===
Year	Title	Role	Network
1994	Confessions of a Sorority Girl (aka Confessions of Sorority Girls)	Producer	Showtime
1994	Roadracers (aka Rebel Highway)	Producer	Showtime
1994	Motorcycle Gang	Producer	Showtime
1994	Runaway Daughters	Producer	Showtime
1994	Girls in Prison	Producer	Showtime
1994	Dragstrip Girl	Producer	Showtime
1994	Jailbreakers		Showtime
1994	Cool and the Crazy		Showtime
1994	Shake, Rattle and Rock!		Showtime
1994	Reform School Girl	Producer	Showtime
2001	Earth Vs. the Spider	Producer	HBO
2001	How to Make a Monster	Producer	Creature Feature Productions
2001	Mermaid Chronicles Part 1: She Creature	Producer	HBO
2001	The Day the World Ended	Producer	HBO
2002	Teenage Caveman	Producer	HBO
