= Hummie Mann =

American film score composer

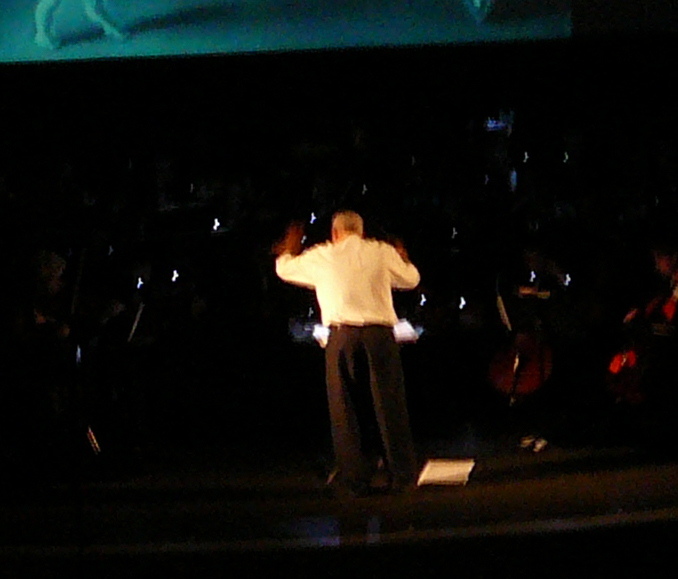
- Mann conducting

Background information
- Born: October 29, 1955 (age 70); Montreal, Quebec, Canada
- Genres: Film score
- Occupations: Composer, conductor, Orchestrator
- Website: www.hummiemann.com

Hummie Mann (born October 29, 1955) is a Canadian-born American film score composer. His credits include the Mel Brooks films Robin Hood: Men in Tights and Dracula: Dead and Loving It, as well as Thomas and the Magic Railroad.

Mann was awarded an Emmy for arranging Billy Crystal's opening number for the 1992 Academy Awards and another Emmy in 1996 for an episode of Showtime's miniseries Picture Windows called "Language of the Heart". He was nominated for two more for arrangements on the series Moonlighting.

== Biography ==
In addition to composing for television and film, Mann has orchestrated several film scores including Addams Family Values, Sister Act, Georgia Rule and Thomas and the Magic Railroad.

In 1997, Mann established the Pacific Northwest Film Scoring Program in Seattle, Washington to instruct students in film scoring, music technology, songwriting for film, and video game audio. This program merged with the Seattle Film Institute in 2011 and became accredited to confer a Masters of Music degree in Film Composition. In 2010, Mann was cited as one of the top 10 "Leaders in Learning" by Variety magazine.

== Filmography ==
=== Film ===
- Stoogemania (1986)
- In Gold We Trust (1990)
- Box-Office Bunny (1991)
- Year of the Comet (1992)
- Benefit of the Doubt (1993)
- Robin Hood: Men in Tights (1993)
- The Red Coat (1993) (short)
- A Test of Will (1994) (short)
- Fall Time (1995)
- Dracula: Dead and Loving It (1995)
- Sticks & Stones (1996)
- Moving Pieces (1998) (short)
- After the Rain (1999)
- The Engagement Party (1999)
- Thomas and the Magic Railroad (2000)
- CyberWorld (2000) (with Paul Haslinger)
- Thomas and the Magic Railroad (2000) (original film score & songs; original Thomas themes by Junior Campbell & Mike O’Donnell)
- Milk (2001) (short)
- Wooly Boys (2001)
- Rocket Man: Death from Above (2003) (short)
- Bamboo Shoot (2004)
- Arthur Szyk: Soldier in Art (2006) (short)
- Giants (2010)
- Rocket Man and the Aerial Fortress (2013) (short)
- A Sense of Sound (2015) (short)
- Thomas and the Magic Railroad: 20th Anniversary Celebration (2020)
- Rocket Man and the Phantom Baron (2020) (short)
- The Automat (2021)
- Vincent the Artist (TBD)

=== Television ===
- Funny, You Don't Look 200: A Constitutional Vaudeville (1987) (TV movie)
- Alfred Hitchcock Presents (2 episodes; 1988-1989)
- Tiny Toon Adventures (2 episodes; 1990-1991)
- Morton & Hayes (6 episodes; 1991)
- Great Scott! (4 episodes; 1992)
- Confessions of Sorority Girls (1994) (TV Movie)
- Motorcycle Gang (1994) (TV movie)
- Girls in Prison (1994) (TV movie)
- Dragstrip Girl (1994) (TV movie)
- Cool and the Crazy (1994) (TV movie)
- Reform School Girl (1994) (TV movie)
- Rebel Highway (8 episodes; 1994)
- Picture Windows (5 episodes; 1994-1995)
- In Cold Blood (1996) (miniseries)
- ...First Do No Harm (1997) (TV movie)
- The Second Civil War (1997) (TV movie)
- I Am Your Child (1997) (TV movie)
- Rescuers: Stories of Courage: Two Women (1997) (TV movie)
- Naked City: A Killer Christmas (1998) (TV movie)
- P.T. Barnum (1999) (TV movie)
- Meat Loaf: To Hell and Back (2000) (TV movie)
- Captain Sturdy: Back in Action (2001) (TV short)
- Masters of Horror (2 episodes; 2005-2006)
- Inside Passage 2005 (TV movie)
- Suzanne's Diary for Nicholas (2005) (TV movie)
