= Roadracers (1994 film) =

- DVD cover
- Written by: Robert Rodriguez; Tommy Nix
- Directed by: Robert Rodriguez
- Starring: David Arquette; Salma Hayek; John Hawkes; Jason Wiles; William Sadler
- Theme music composer: Paul Boll; Johnny Reno
- Country of origin: United States
- Original language: English

Production
- Producers: Lou Arkoff; David Giler; Debra Hill; Willie Kutner
- Production location: Whittier, California
- Cinematography: Roberto Schaefer
- Editor: Robert Rodriguez
- Running time: 95 minutes
- Budget: $1,000,000

Original release
- Network: Showtime
- Release: July 22, 1994

Roadracers is a 1994 made-for-television film directed by Robert Rodriguez, his second feature film following the success of his 1992 debut, El Mariachi. The film originally aired on Showtime Network as part of their Rebel Highway series that took the titles of 1950s-era B-movies and applied them to original films starring up-and-coming actors of the 1990s (including the likes of Alicia Silverstone and Shannen Doherty) and directed by established directors such as William Friedkin, Joe Dante, and Ralph Bakshi. Rodriguez was the only young director to participate in the series. The series was produced by the son and daughter of Samuel Z. Arkoff, the co-founder and producer of American International Pictures (AIP), the distributor of the films this series takes its titles from.

Robert Rodriguez's take concerned a rebel named Dude Delaney (David Arquette) who dreams of leaving his dead end small town and becoming a rockabilly star but gets caught up in a nasty feud with the town's local sheriff (William Sadler) and his son (Jason Wiles). Salma Hayek plays Dude's girlfriend, Donna.

== Plot ==
Dude, a 1950s greaser, engages in a high-speed chase with the local cops, Sarge and his unnamed partner. After Dude causes their car to crash in a game of chicken, he joins his girlfriend Donna at a club. Donna does not enjoy the loud rock music preferred by Dude, and she is annoyed that he has made her wait. After they dance, Dude's friend Nixer joins them, much to Donna's annoyance. As they cruise around town and try to decide what to do, they run into Teddy, a rival greaser, and his friends. After exchanging insults, the two groups engage in a drag race. When Dude flicks his cigarette at the other car, it lands in Teddy's girlfriend's hair and sets it on fire. Teddy's car swerves and loses the race as the occupants attempt to put out the fire. Teddy and his friends swear revenge, and Dude drives off.

When he later sees Dude, Sarge threatens to arrest him but says that he is content to wait for a charge that will result in Dude's incarceration. Sarge privately berates his son, Teddy, for letting Dude make a fool of him and says that Teddy must get the situation under control before others begin to question Teddy's authority – and Sarge's own by extension. Teddy later confronts Dude and Nixer at J. T.'s diner, but J. T. defuses the situation. When Teddy challenges Dude to a street fight, one of Teddy's friends reminds him that he has set up a date with his girlfriend, who is his friend's sister. Teddy is forced to delay the fight, and Dude sets a date with Donna at the same roller rink. Annoyed to find Dude there, Teddy attempts to start a fight with him, only to end up embarrassed when Dude uses his hair gel to cause Teddy and his friends to crash.

Dude, Nixer, and Donna go to see Nixer's favorite film, Invasion of the Body Snatchers, and they later discuss the film's themes at J. T.'s diner. J. T. tells them that they must be ready to seize opportunities when they present themselves, as they may not get another chance. Like Invasion's protagonist, they may find themselves stuck in a situation with no escape. Donna urges Dude to take advantage of his interest in music, and Dude casually inquires about trying out for a local band that he enjoys. Although he does not commit to an audition, he becomes excited about the possibility of escaping his small town. Meanwhile, Teddy again confronts Dude at J. T.'s diner after sexually harassing Donna. Donna initially tries to talk Dude out of a fight but stops when Teddy continues to harass her. Sarge breaks up the two before they can engage in a switchblade fight in public.

Fed up with Teddy's failure to take care of Dude, Sarge hands him a pistol and tells him that he must resolve the situation by that night. Sarge tells him to do it privately, so that he will not be implicated in the murder. Dude is torn between fighting Teddy and auditioning for the band, and both Donna and Nixer attempt to convince him to ignore Teddy. Dude finally decides to audition for the band, but when he shows up, he finds that they have sold out and now play bland pop music. Angry, he leaves the club, only to be confronted by Teddy, who wounds him as he flees. Dude returns home to fetch a shotgun, and he kills Teddy but spares Teddy's girlfriend Julie. As he prepares to leave town, Dude says goodbye to both Donna and Nixer. Having learned about his son's death, Sarge attempts to kill Dude, but Dude causes a fatal car crash by shooting out Sarge's tires. Dude drives on with a sinister smile on his face.

== Cast ==
- David Arquette as "Dude"
- Salma Hayek as Donna
- John Hawkes as Nixer
- Jason Wiles as Teddy
- William Sadler as "Sarge"
- O'Neal Compton as J.T.

Kevin McCarthy, who played Dr. Miles Bennell in Invasion of the Body Snatchers, appears briefly in the theatre scene while they're watching Invasion of the Body Snatchers and in a post-credits cameo.

== Music ==
The film's music score was composed by Paul Boll and Johnny Reno. Reno and Rodriguez had previously played in a band together, and Rodriguez insisted that Reno be brought into the project. For other music in the film, Rodriguez found that Link Wray's work was not currently in demand, and he was able to license it at an inexpensive rate. When he told Quentin Tarantino about this, Tarantino also licensed Wray's music for Pulp Fiction. Music supervisors Karyn Rachtman and Mary Ramos worked on both Roadracers and Pulp Fiction, and the two films' soundtracks influenced each other.

While a "soundtrack album available on A&M Records" is listed in the end credits, there was no standalone soundtrack release for Roadracers. A&M did release a compilation album as a companion to the Showtime series in 1994, titled Fast Track to Nowhere. It featured newly recorded covers of classic '50s songs performed by Iggy Pop, Los Lobos, Concrete Blonde and others, all heard in the Rebel Highway series.

== Production ==
Rodriguez was used to shooting films very fast and ran into resistance with his Hollywood crew (most notably the director of photography). He discusses these conflicts in the now out-of-print book, Roadracers: the Making of a Degenerate Hot Rod Flick. Rodriguez replaced director Wes Craven, who left the Rebel Highway project when Wes Craven's New Nightmare was greenlit. Rodriguez said that due to the fast shooting schedule of this film, as of an interview in April 2012, he had not yet beaten the record number of camera setups performed in one day. Rodriguez had complete creative control over the film.

== Home media ==
A Special Edition DVD release was scheduled for December 13, 2005 but for some unknown reason never happened. Rodriguez stated in an online interview what the specs for it were: "It has a ten minute film school on it, commentary and a new digital color correction I worked on for a quite a long while... it looks really good, and I remixed the sound in 5.1 and beefed up the sound on it. One of my favorite movies, I shot it in 13 days, and the making of it shows how to make a feature in 13 days."

Echo Bridge Entertainment released Roadracers on DVD March 20, 2012, and Blu-ray Disc April 17, 2012. The Blu-ray Disc included a 5.1 DTS soundtrack, and both the DVD and Blu-ray Disc say "Director's Cut" on the box. The special features include an audio commentary with Rodriguez and a 10 Minute Film School. In 2011, Miramax made a deal with Hulu Plus and Netflix to instant stream their film library. As a result, Roadracers has also been available for digital streaming.

== Reception ==
John J. O'Connor of The New York Times wrote, "From square parents to ominous rumbles, Roadracers doesn't miss a cliche in the depiction of rebels without a cause. Skillfully done, though." Chris Willman of the Los Angeles Times called it "a giddily shameless paean to misspent youth". Louis Black of The Austin Chronicle called "the perfect Roger Corman movie" as made by Rodriguez. John Leonard of New York described it as "a fifties drive-in movie with some nineties salsa on its popcorn".

Reviewing the film on home video, Matt Serafini rated it 3.5/5 stars and wrote, "It’s a fairly simple movie, and a remarkably assured one." Nathan Rabin of The A.V. Club wrote, "Rodriguez is clearly a virtuoso working at the top of his form, and the film's lurid, over-the-top histrionics suit his talents nicely." Ignatiy Vishnevetsky, also of The A.V. Club, said, "I wish cable networks were a little more willing to undertake these kinds of cheap, chancy projects." Mike D'Angelo of Entertainment Weekly rated it B− and called it "a fun pastiche" until the violent climax. R. L. Shaffer of IGN rated it 8/10 and wrote, "Fans of Robert Rodriguez should definitely check out Roadracers. The film reminds us of the director's humble roots, all while providing 90 minutes of fun, fast-paced, grindhouse-style filmmaking."
