= Reform School Girl (1994 film) =

- Genre: Drama
- Based on: Reform School Girl by Edward Bernds
- Screenplay by: Bruce Meade
- Story by: Edward Bernds; Bruce Meade
- Directed by: Jonathan Kaplan
- Starring: Aimee Graham; Matt LeBlanc
- Music by: Hummie Mann
- Country of origin: United States
- Original language: English

Production
- Producers: Lou Arkoff; Debra Hill; Willie Kutner
- Cinematography: James Chressanthis
- Editor: Michael Ornstein
- Running time: 85 minutes
- Production company: Drive-In Classics Cinema

Original release
- Network: Showtime
- Release: September 23, 1994

Reform School Girl is a 1994 American drama television film directed by Jonathan Kaplan.

Reform School Girl originally aired on Showtime on September 23, 1994, as part of the anthology series Rebel Highway. It is a remake of the 1957 B-movie Reform School Girl.

== Plot ==
Donna seeks to escape her life of avoiding the advances of her legal guardian, her lecherous uncle, and takes a ride in a stolen car with bad boy Vince, who gets them involved in a hit-and-run accident. Unable to escape, she is sent to McCarthy Reform School for Wayward Girls to take the fall for Vince because she does not know his last name and cannot identify him, but she is most upset that her uncle will now turn his attention toward her younger sister Cathy.

Donna is befriended by a kleptomaniac nicknamed "Dink" on the way to the reform school and once there she meets the other girls. She resists the advances of the school psychologist, who accuses her of throwing herself at him in order to get her sent to solitary confinement. During an exercise break, her speed is noticed by Coach Buxbaum and reported to Headmistress Turnbull, an Olympic medal-winner who offers Donna early release if she wins a track competition at Velmont Academy, a girls' prep school in Hillsdale. Turnbull gives a silver medallion to Priscilla for running, but when Priscilla finds that Dink has stolen it she fights her and Dink injures Priscilla's knee. Dink is sent away and Priscilla is left unable to compete. Donna becomes intimate with Carmen Peña, who is the fastest girl at the reform school but refuses to compete for Headmistress Turnbull because she does not want to owe her anything.

Vince befriends Cathy, then visits Donna in prison and explains that he was arrested for grand theft auto and the police are trying to connect him to the hit-and-run incident. He warns Donna that he will hurt her sister if she talks to the police about him. After seeing how upset Donna is after a visit from her uncle and sister, Turnbull knows that Donna wants to call her sister but revokes her phone privileges to motivate her to compete, so Carmen calls Cathy and tells her about money hidden behind Donna's mirror. When Cathy finds the money, her uncle tries to take it from her but Cathy sprays him in the eyes with perfume and escapes with the money to take a bus to Kansas.

Priscilla reports Donna and Carmen's lovemaking to Turnbull but only Carmen is punished so that Donna can still compete in Kansas. At the competition, Donna wins a race while Velmont student Jody Beaumont wins the hurdles event and breaks the record in the long jump. The final event is the 4 × 440 yards relay, where Donna and Jody are put in the final slot against one another. They shake hands, receive the batons, and Donna overtakes Jody. Just before the finish line she remembers what Carmen said and how Dink was sent away. Instead of crossing the finish line, she stops and gives the finger to Turnbull. Jody comes from behind and wins. Back at the reform school she receives a letter from her sister that she is safe in Kansas.

== Cast ==
- Aimee Graham as Donna Patterson
- Teresa DiSpina as Carmen Peña
- Matt LeBlanc as Vince
- Carolyn Seymour as Mrs. Evelyn Turnbull
- Eleanor O'Brien as Angela "Dink" Dinkens
- Samaria Graham as Priscilla Wells
- Marissa Ribisi as Joanie Dubois
- Erin Wiley Sands as Mona Smith (as Erin Leshawn Wiley)
- Catherine Paolone as Matron Miriam Mather
- Nick Chinlund as Dr. Ted Meeks
- Lynn Eastman-Rossi as Home Ec. Teacher (as Lynn Eastman)
- Dino Anello as Coach Buxbaum
- Harry Northup as Uncle Charlie
- Ashley Lister as Kathy Patterson
- Bill Calvert as Gary
- Alix Koromzay as Josie
- Chuck Bennett as Judge
- Diane Robin as Defense Attorney
- Bob Minor as Motorcycle Cop
- Tara Strong as Lucille (as Tara Charendoff)
- Susie Stillwell as Matron Johnson
- Barbara Cole as Matron Cole
- Chris Coombs as Race Starter
- Michelle Morris as Jody Beaumont
- Curt Boulware as TV Host
- Christie Mellor as McCarthy Girl
- Katie Leigh as McCarthy Girl
- Wendy Schaal as Velmont Girl
- Elisa Gabrielli as Velmont Girl (as Elisa Pensler-Gabrielli)
- Leo Rossi as Disc Jockey
- Leigh French as Velmont Announcer
- Johnny Meyer as Visitor at School
