= Caveman (film) =

1981 film by Carl Gottlieb

- Theatrical release poster
- Directed by: Carl Gottlieb
- Written by: Rudy De Luca; Carl Gottlieb
- Produced by: David Foster; Lawrence Turman
- Starring: Ringo Starr; Barbara Bach; Dennis Quaid; Shelley Long; John Matuszak; Avery Schreiber; Jack Gilford
- Cinematography: Alan Hume
- Edited by: Gene Fowler Jr.
- Music by: Lalo Schifrin
- Production companies: Turman-Foster Company; Estudios Churubusco
- Distributed by: United Artists
- Release dates: April 17, 1981 (United States); December 25, 1981 (Mexico)
- Running time: 91 minutes
- Countries: Mexico; United States
- Language: English
- Budget: $6.5 million
- Box office: $16 million

Caveman is a 1981 slapstick comedy film written and directed by Carl Gottlieb and starring Ringo Starr, Dennis Quaid, Shelley Long and Barbara Bach. The film is set during prehistory and revolves around the rivalries between cavemen. The film is an international co-production between Mexico and the United States.

== Plot ==
Atouk is a bullied and scrawny caveman living in "One Zillion BC – October 9th". He lusts after the beautiful but shallow Lana, who is the mate of Tonda, their tribe's physically imposing bullying leader and brutish instigator. After being banished along with his friend Lar, Atouk falls in with a band of assorted misfits, among them the comely Tala and the elderly and blind Gog. The group has ongoing encounters with hungry dinosaurs and rescues Lar from a "nearby ice age", where they encounter a yeti. In the course of these adventures, they discover sedative drugs and fire, invent cooking, music and weapons and learn how to walk fully upright. Atouk uses these advances to lead an attack on Tonda, overthrowing him and becoming the tribe's new leader. He rejects Lana and takes Tala as his mate.

== Cast ==
- Ringo Starr as Atouk
- Barbara Bach as Lana
- Dennis Quaid as Lar
- Shelley Long as Tala
- John Matuszak as Tonda
- Avery Schreiber as Ock
- Jack Gilford as Gog
- Ed Greenberg as Kalta
- Cork Hubbert as Ta
- Mark King as Ruck
- Evan C. Kim as Nook
- Carl Lumbly as Bork
- Gigi Vorgan as Folg's Daughter
- Paco Morayta as Flok
- Jack Scalici as Folg
- Miguel Ángel Fuentes as Grot
- Erika Carlsson as Folg's Mate
- Sara López Sierra as Folg's Younger Daughter
- Esteban Valdez as Folg's Son
- Juan Ancona Figueroa as Folg's Younger Son
- Juan Omar Ortiz as Folg's Youngest Son
- Anaís de Melo as Meeka
- Tere Álvarez as Ock's Mate
- Ana De Sade as Grot's Mate
- Gerardo Zepeda as Boola
- Hector Moreno as Noota
- Pamela Gual as Noota's Mate
- Richard Moll as Abominable Snowman

== Production ==
Filming was mostly done in the Sierra de Órganos National Park in the town of Sombrerete in the state of Zacatecas, Mexico. The river and fishing lake scene was shot in the Mexican state of Durango, and some scenes were filmed at the Churubusco Studios in Mexico City. The film features stop motion animated dinosaurs constructed by Jim Danforth, including a Tyrannosaurus Rex which in one scene becomes intoxicated by a cannabis-type drug, animated by Randall W. Cook. Danforth was a major participant in the special effects sequences, but left the film "about two-thirds of the way" (his words) through the work because the Directors Guild of America prohibited his contracted on-screen credit, co-direction with Carl Gottlieb. Consequently, Danforth's name does not appear on the film.

The film's dialog is almost entirely in "caveman" language, such as:

- "aiyee" – help
- "alunda" – love
- "bobo" – friend
- "caca" – shit
- "gluglug" – drowned
- "guwi" – out to get
- "haraka" – fire
- "kuda" – come
- "macha" – monster
- "nya" – no/not
- "ool" – food
- "pooka" – broken/pain
- "ugh" – like
- "ya" – yes
- "zug zug" – sex/mate

At some showings audiences were issued a translation pamphlet for 30 "caveman words." The only English dialog present is used for comedic effect, when it is spoken by a caveman played by Evan Kim who speaks modern English but is understood by none of the other characters. Being a Korean caveman, by speaking English, he appears to be more advanced than the rest. At her audition, Long said she did not speak any English, but responded to everything with grunts.

Barbara Bach and Ringo Starr first met on the set of Caveman, and they married just over a year later.

== Home media ==
The film was released on Region 1 DVD by MGM Home Entertainment on June 4, 2002. It was then released on February 17, 2015 on Blu-ray Disc by Olive Films.

== Reception ==
On Rotten Tomatoes the film has an approval rating of 33% based on reviews from 21 critics, with an average rating of 4.7/10. On Metacritic the film has a score of 55% based on reviews from 7 critics, indicating "mixed or average" reviews.

Roger Ebert gave the film 1.5 stars out of a possible 4. The cast was "interesting", he wrote, but the main failing of Caveman was it being a spoof with "no popular original material for it to satirize. There has never been a really successful movie set in prehistoric times." Ebert and Gene Siskel both gave the film a negative "don't see it" review on their TV show but softened their criticism somewhat by noting that its dinosaur-related sequences were amusing.

Janet Maslin of The New York Times wrote that the film was "dopey, but it's also lots of fun", and that the real star was the special-effects dinosaur. Pauline Kael of The New Yorker gave it a positive review, calling it "a funky, buoyant farce."

Gary Arnold of The Washington Post gave it a mixed review. He was critical with the lack of originality but suggests younger audiences who have not seen it before may enjoy it. Arnold compares the film unfavorably to Three Ages: where Buster Keaton was able to bring his genius to that picture, Caveman struggles to overcome Starr's limits, and director Gottlieb fails to make use of other talented actors such as Quaid, Schreiber, or Gilford.

== See also ==
- List of films featuring dinosaurs
