= Dragstrip Girl (1994 film) =

- DVD cover
- Genre: Drama
- Written by: Jerome Gary
- Directed by: Mary Lambert
- Starring: Mark Dacascos; Natasha Gregson Wagner; María Celedonio
- Theme music composer: Hummie Mann
- Country of origin: United States
- Original language: English

Production
- Producers: Lou Arkoff; David Giler; Debra Hill; Willie Kutner
- Production location: Los Angeles
- Cinematography: Sandi Sissel
- Editor: Gordon Antell
- Running time: 82 minutes
- Production company: Showtime

Original release
- Network: Showtime
- Release: September 2, 1994

Dragstrip Girl is a 1994 American drama film directed by Mary Lambert.

Dragstrip Girl originally aired on the cable television network Showtime on September 2, 1994 as part of the anthology series, Rebel Highway. As with other films in the series its name is taken from a 1950s B-movie (Dragstrip Girl) but its plot bears no resemblance to that film.

== Plot ==
Johnny is a bad guy trying to go straight. He becomes smitten with Laura, a wealthy good girl rebelling against her parents by pretending to go steady with him. This film is set against the backdrop of 1950s Los Angeles.

== Cast ==
- Mark Dacascos as Johnny Ramirez
- Natasha Gregson Wagner as Laura Bickford
- María Celedonio as Pearl
- Christopher Crabb as Alex
- Raymond Cruz as Doogie
- Frederick Coffin as Mr. Bickford
- Traci Lords as Blanche
- Richard Portnow as Det. Dryden
- Tracy Wells as Megan
- Augusto Sandino as Anthony
- Adam Gifford as Evan
- Carolyn Mignini as Mrs. Bickford
- Gary Werntz as McCarthy
- Luis Contrera as Raoul
- Bill A. Jones as Mr. Jones

== Reception ==
In a review for The A.V. Club, reviewer Nathan Rabin wrote that "the film has dreamy, ethereal atmosphere to spare, but Lambert and screenwriter Jerome Gary fail to fill their evocative '50s dreamscape with sympathetic or interesting characters."
