= Donna Arkoff Roth =

American film producer

- Born: Donna Arkoff; October 19, 1951 (age 74); Los Angeles, California U.S.
- Other names: Donna Arkoff Pinder
- Occupation: producer
- Years active: 1993–2008
- Spouses: Mike Pinder (m. 1970; div. 1974) Joe Roth (m. 1980; div. 2004)
- Father: Samuel Z. Arkoff

Donna Arkoff Roth (born October 19, 1951) is an American film producer, known for producing movies like 13 Going on 30, Grosse Pointe Blank, & Benny & Joon.

== Personal life ==
Roth is the daughter of Hilda Rusoff and producer Samuel Z. Arkoff.

In 1970, Roth married musician Mike Pinder of The Moody Blues; they divorced in 1974. In 1980, Roth married producer and director Joe Roth; they divorced in 2004.

== Filmography ==
Producer

- Benny & Joon (1993)
- Unstrung Heroes (1995)
- Grosse Pointe Blank (1997)
- Forces of Nature (1999)
- The Haunting (1999)
- America's Sweethearts (2001)
- 13 Going on 30 (2004)
- Drillbit Taylor (2008)
