= Girls in Prison (1994 film) =

1994 American television film

- Genre: Drama; Thriller; Crime
- Written by: Samuel Fuller; Christa Lang
- Directed by: John McNaughton
- Starring: Ione Skye; Anne Heche; Jon Polito
- Theme music composer: Hummie Mann
- Country of origin: United States
- Original language: English

Production
- Producers: Lou Arkoff; David Giler; Debra Hill; Willie Kutner
- Cinematography: Jean de Segonzac
- Editor: Larry Bock
- Running time: 83 min.
- Production companies: Showtime Networks; Spelling Films International; American International Pictures

Original release
- Network: Showtime
- Release: August 19, 1994

Girls in Prison is a 1994 American television film directed by John McNaughton. Girls in Prison originally aired on the cable television network Showtime in 1994 as part of the series Rebel Highway.

== Plot ==
An aspiring young singer is sent to prison after getting wrongly convicted of murdering a record company president in 1950s Hollywood. With the help of two other convicts, she must survive as the real culprits send "hit girls" to kill her inside. One of these convicts connects her to a private investigator who tracks the culprits down, but the real murderer is determined to silence her.

== Cast ==
- Diane McGee as Mrs. Felton
- Harvey Chao as Liam Fong
- Bahni Turpin as Melba
- Ralph Meyering Jr. as Jim Jeffrey
- Letitia Hicks as Receptionist
- Ione Skye as Carol Madison
- J. Patrick McCormack as Gordon Madison
- William C. Clark as Actor Playing McCarthy
- William Boyett as Dr. Shainmark
- David Paul Needles as McCarthy On Newsreel
- Tamara Clatterbuck as Actress On Newsreel
- Missy Crider as Aggie O'Hanlon
- Jon Polito as "Boss" Johnson
- Anne Heche as Jennifer
- Angie Rae McKinney as Miranda
- Nestor Serrano as Benito "Junior" Borcelino
- Nicolette Scorsese as Suzy
- Raymond O'Connor as Mickey Maven
- Miguel Sandoval as Lucky
