= Kent Anderson (novelist) =

American writer

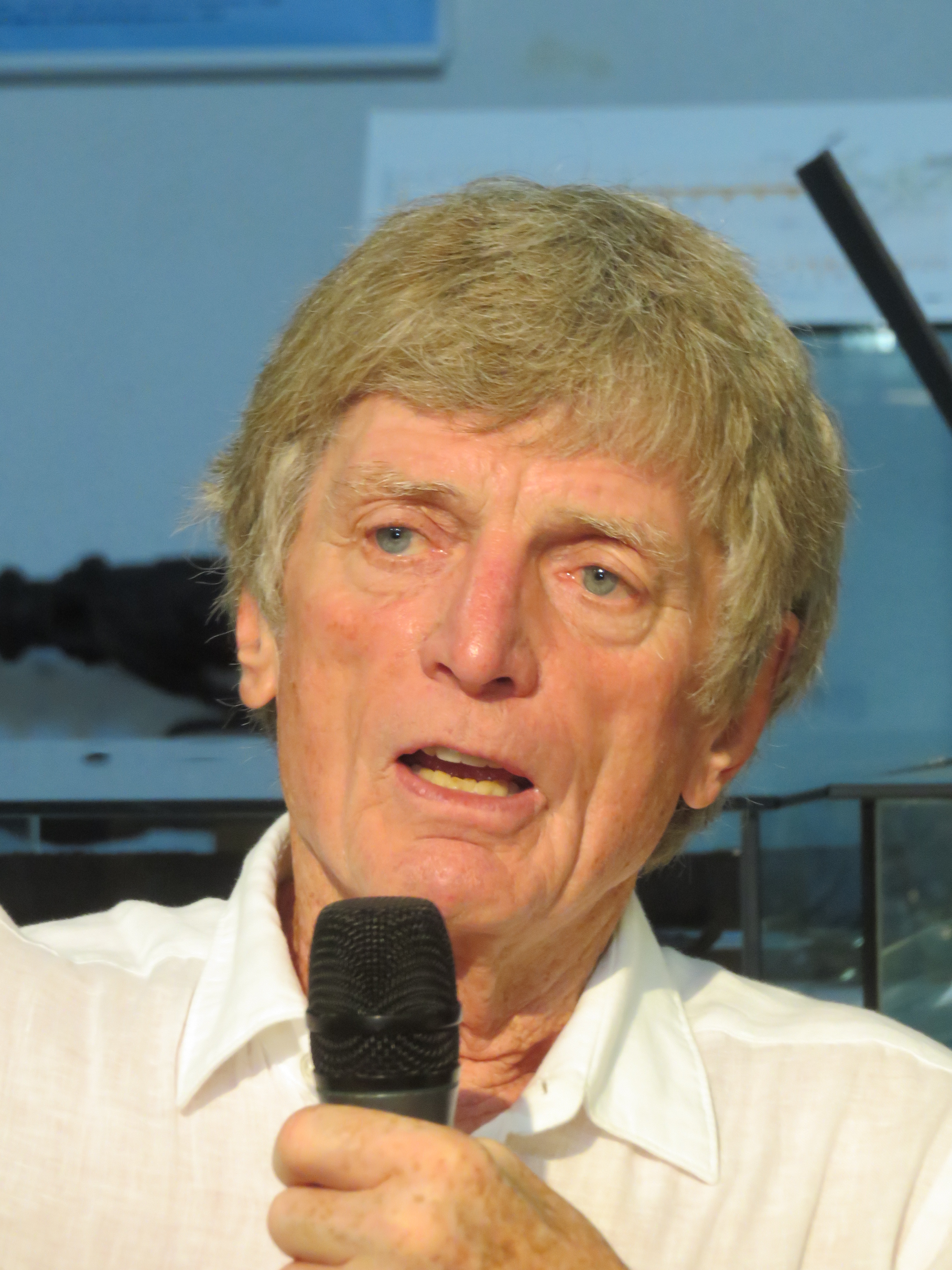
- Anderson in 2019
- Born: August 20, 1945 (age 81)
- Writing career
- Notable works: Sympathy for the Devil. Doubleday. 1987. ISBN 9780385239431 Night Dogs. Dennis McMillan Publications. 1996. ISBN 9780553107647 Green Sun. Mulholland Books; 1st Edition. 2018 ISBN 978-0316466806 Liquor, Guns & Ammo. Dennis McMillan Publications. 1998. ISBN 9780939767298
- Military career
- Allegiance: United States
- Branch: United States Army
- Service years: 1968–1970
- Unit: 5th Special Forces Group (United States)
- Conflicts: Vietnam War

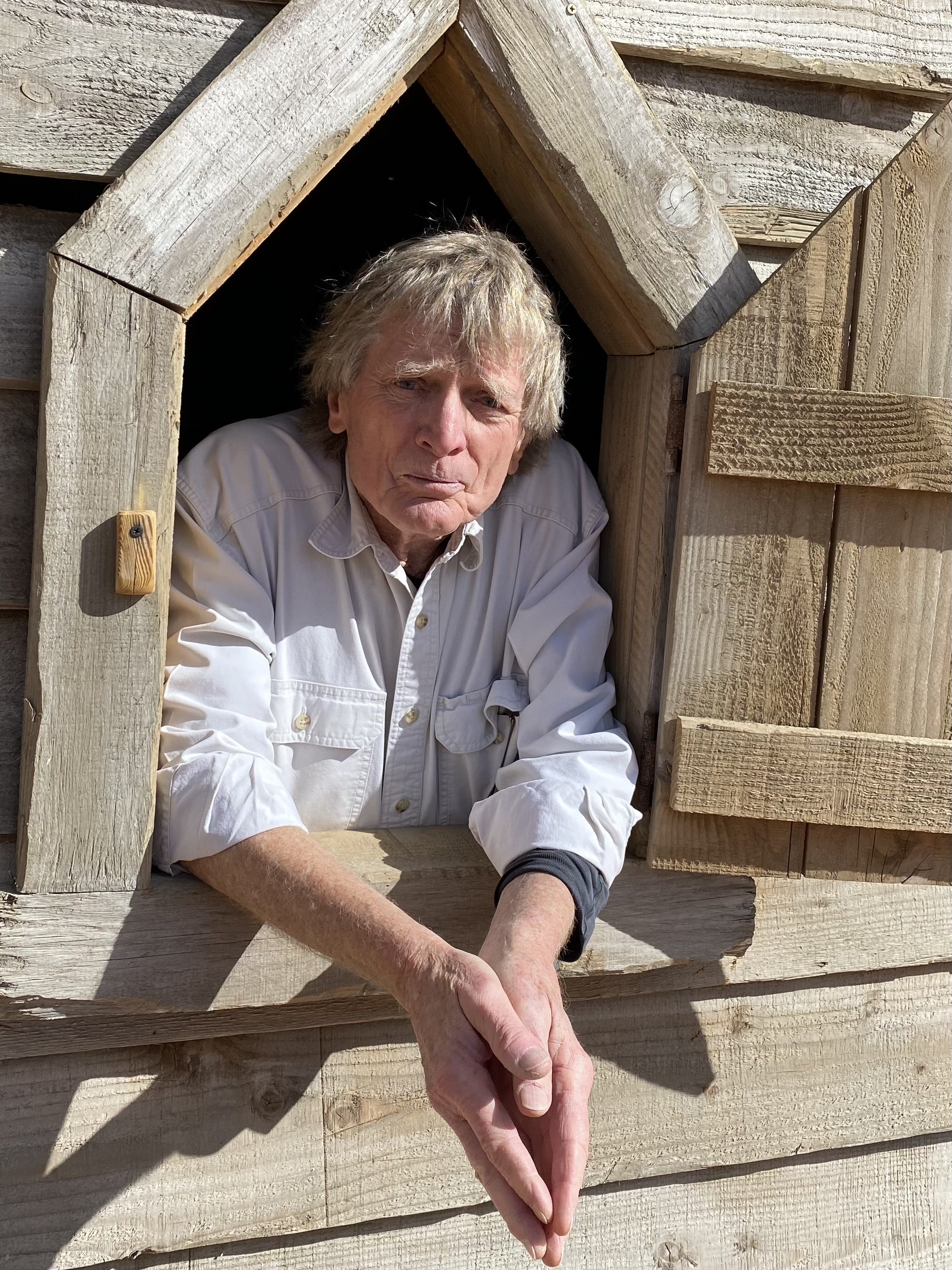
Kent Anderson in New Mexico in 2022

Kent Anderson (born August 20, 1945) is an American author, screenwriter, Vietnam War veteran, former police officer and former university professor. He is best known for his three novels based on his experiences as a Vietnam era Green Beret and a police officer in Portland and Oakland.

== Life ==
Anderson was born in North Carolina on August 20, 1946. He grew up in North Carolina. At age 19 he joined the Merchant Marine as an Ordinary Seaman and worked as a deck hand for two years on merchant ships traveling both the Atlantic and Pacific Oceans.

He then attended the University of North Carolina at Greensboro for two years before he received his draft notice and enlisted in the US Army. He went through Special Forces (“Green Beret”) training and was sent to Vietnam and assigned to Special Forces camp A-101 Mai Loc from 1969 to 1970. He was awarded the Combat Infantryman Badge and two Bronze Star Medals.

After returning from Vietnam he completed his English BA, and then, unable to find work for over a year, joined the Portland, Oregon Police Bureau, where he worked as a patrolman from 1972 to 1976. He received the first of two NEA creative writing fellowships in 1976, took a two-year leave of absence from the Portland Police, and earned a Master of Fine Arts in Fiction writing at the University of Montana in 1978. Anderson then resigned from the Portland police. He worked again as a police patrolman, in Oakland, California, in 1982 and 1983, before resigning to write his first novel, Sympathy for the Devil, about a young Special Forces soldier in the Vietnam War known only as “Hanson.”

Hanson is the protagonist of all three of Anderson's novels, grown older and, as the result of his accumulated experience, seeing the world, and himself, differently in each book. Each novel of the trilogy easily stands on its own, and while the books are strongly autobiographical, Anderson presents them as novels.

Anderson was a visiting writer at the University of Texas at El Paso in El Paso, Texas until 1986. He moved to Los Angeles and began teaching creative writing at UCLA. Anderson became a protégé of John Milius and spent four years writing screenplays for New Line Cinema. He won a second NEA creative writing fellowship in 1987.

Anderson left Hollywood to work as a tenure-track assistant professor at Boise State University in Boise, Idaho. There he finished his second novel, Night Dogs, which finds Hanson working as a police officer in Portland. In Night Dogs Hanson is moving towards self-destruction, worn down by the violence and suffering he witnesses (and participates in) every day, his memories of the war, and his own drug and alcohol use. The novel's ending offers a moment of hope. Night Dogs was selected by The New York Times as a Notable Book of the Year for 1998. and the French edition, Chiens de la Nuit, won the “Prix Calibre 38.” prize for best novel that same year. The following year he published Liquor, Guns & Ammo, a collection of autobiographical non-fiction.

While living in Santa Fe, New Mexico, he published a collection of non-fiction pieces, Pas de Saison Pour L’enfer, (No Season For Hell) in France, and in 2018 published a third Hanson novel, Green Sun, inspired by his work as a police patrolman in Oakland.

Green Sun was one of five finalists for the Los Angeles Times Book Prize in 2018. The French edition, Un Soleil Sans Espoir, was awarded the 2019 “Grand Prix du Roman noir etranger de Beaune,” and the 2019 “Grand Prix de Litterature Policiere,” two of the most prestigious award given for crime and detective fiction in France. Anderson was the Guest of Honor in 2019 at the Festival International du Roman Noir de Frontignan, France.

Anderson lives in Medanales, New Mexico, on a horse ranch along the Chama River, where he is at work on a memoir about the years he spent with wild and half-wild horses in central Idaho.

== Works ==
- Sympathy for the Devil. Doubleday. 1987. ISBN 9780385239431
- Night Dogs. Dennis McMillan Publications. 1996. ISBN 9780553107647
- Liquor, Guns & Ammo. Dennis McMillan Publications. 1998. ISBN 9780939767298
- Green Sun. Mulholland Books. 2018. ISBN 9780316466806
