= Gigi Vorgan =

American screenwriter and producer

- Born: August 3, 1958 (age 68); Los Angeles, California, U.S.
- Occupations: Writer, producer and actress
- Years active: 1971-1994
- Spouse: Dr. Gary Small

Gigi Vorgan (born August 3, 1958) is an American writer and producer who appeared in numerous feature films and television projects before joining her husband, Dr. Gary Small, to cowrite iBrain, The Memory Prescription, The Longevity Bible, and The Memory Bible. She worked as a child actress, then she went on hiatus, and when she was 18 years old she got a call from her agent to go down to Universal and meet the producer and director of Jaws 2. She also acted in Splendor in the Grass (1981), Caveman (1981) and Red Heat (1988), and had voice roles in Rain Man (1988) and The 'Burbs (1989).

== Filmography ==
- Knots Landing: Back to the Cul-de-Sac (mini-series) (1997) as Carol
- The New Age (1994) (voice role)
- The Spirit of '76 (1990) as The Voice Talent
- Vital Signs (1990) as Nell
- Dad (1989) (voice role)
- The 'Burbs (1989) as The Voice-Over Actor
- Rain Man (1988) (voice role)
- Red Heat (1988) as Officer Audrey
- California (1983–1987) as Carol
- Summer School (1987) as The Student
- Children of a Lesser God (1986) as Announcer
- Knots Landing (1983-1985) as Carol
- George Burns Comedy Week (1985)
- Alfred Hitchcock Presents (1985) as The Cashier
- Fama (1985) as Tina
- Otherworld (1985) as Girl No. 2
- Marian Rose White (1982) as Irene
- Splendor in the Grass (1981) as June
- Caveman (1981) as Folg's Daughter
- Marriage Is Alive and Well (1980) as Rachel Saderwise
- Married: The First Year (1979) as Cookie Levin
- Hardcore (1979) as The Teenage Girl
- Jaws 2 (1978) as Brooke Peters
- Speeding? (1975) as The High School Cheerleader
- Johnny Got His Gun (1971) as Catherine, Age 13
