= Samuel Z. Arkoff =

American producer of B movies (1918–2001)

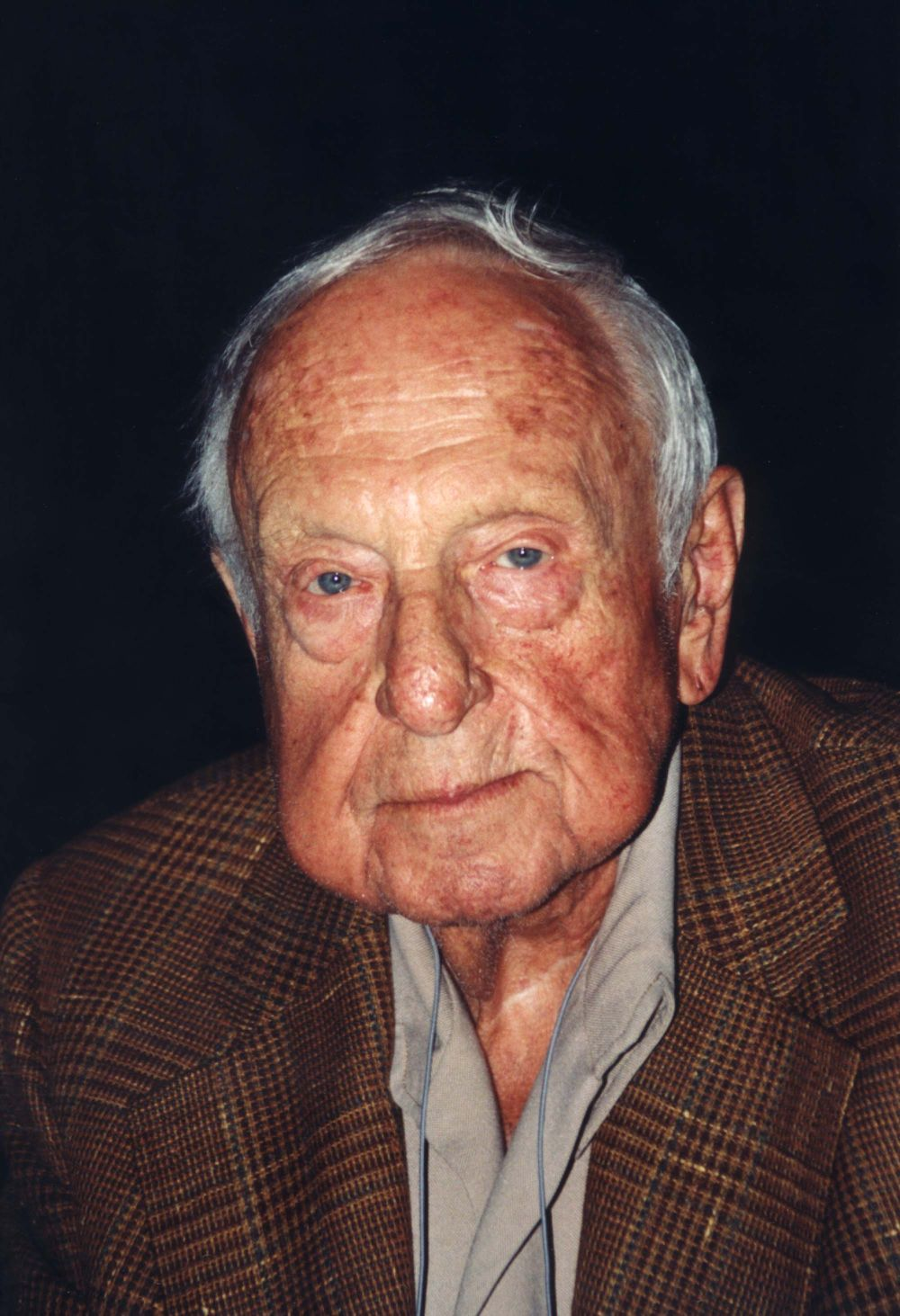
- Arkoff in 2000
- Born: Samuel Zachary Arkoff; June 12, 1918; Fort Dodge, Iowa, U.S.
- Died: September 16, 2001 (aged 83); Burbank, California, U.S.
- Resting place: Mount Sinai Memorial Park Cemetery
- Occupation: Film producer
- Known for: co-founder of American International Pictures
- Spouse: Hilda Rusoff
- Children: 2, Louis and Donna

Samuel Zachary Arkoff (June 12, 1918 – September 16, 2001) was an American film producer, known as the co-founder of American International Pictures.

== Life and career ==
Arkoff was born in Fort Dodge, Iowa, to Russian Jewish parents. He was the son of Helen (Lurie) and Louis Arkoff, who ran his Louis Clothing Co. Arkoff first studied to be a lawyer. He began his career in Hollywood as a producer of The Hank McCune Show, a seminal sitcom produced in 1951.

In 1954, James H. Nicholson founded the American Releasing Corporation, which later became known as American International Pictures, and made Arkoff the vice-president. AIP films were mostly low-budget, with production completed in a few days, though nearly all of them became profitable. Along with business partner James H. Nicholson and producer-director Roger Corman, he produced eighteen films.

Arkoff is also credited with starting a few genres, such as beach party and outlaw biker movies, and his company played a substantial part in bringing the horror film genre to a novel level with successes such as Blacula, I Was a Teenage Werewolf and The Thing with Two Heads. American International Pictures movies starred many established actors in principal or cameo roles, such as Boris Karloff, Elsa Lanchester, Peter Lorre, and Vincent Price, as well as others who later became household names, including Don Johnson, Nick Nolte, Diane Ladd, and most notably Jack Nicholson. A number of actors shunned or overlooked by most of Hollywood during the 1960s and 1970s, such as Bruce Dern and Dennis Hopper, also found work in one or more of Arkoff's productions. Arkoff's most financially successful film was the 1979 adaptation of Jay Anson's book The Amityville Horror.

Following the sale of AIP to Filmways in 1979 for $30 million, Arkoff was unhappy with the direction of the company and resigned in December 1979 to set up his own production company, Arkoff International Pictures., receiving a payout worth $1.4 million.

Arkoff's 1992 autobiography was titled Flying Through Hollywood by the Seat of my Pants: From the Man who Brought You I was a Teenage Werewolf and Muscle Beach Party.

In 2000, Arkoff was featured alongside former collaborators including Roger Corman, Dick Miller and Peter Bogdanovich in the documentary SCHLOCK! The Secret History of American Movies, a film about the rise and fall of American exploitation cinema.

== Personal life and death ==
He was married to Hilda Rusoff until her death in July 2001. They had two children: Louis "Lou" Arkoff, who was also his producing partner; and Donna Roth, who is a movie producer married to the former chairman of Walt Disney Studios Joe Roth. He also had five grandchildren and a great-grandson.

Arkoff died in Burbank, California, on September 16, 2001, at the age of 83.

== The "ARKOFF Formula" ==
During a 1980s television talk show appearance, Arkoff shared with viewers his "ARKOFF Formula" for making successful, memorable films. The formula—or, more accurately, the checklist—forms an acronym of his surname, and it identifies the content elements that should be considered and included in a movie, especially in a low-budget production:

- Action (exciting, entertaining drama)
- Revolution (novel or controversial themes and ideas)
- Killing (a modicum of violence)
- Oratory (notable dialogue and speeches)
- Fantasy (acted-out fantasies common to the audience)
- Fornication (sex appeal, for young adults)
