= Kevin McCarthy (actor) =

American actor (1914–2010)

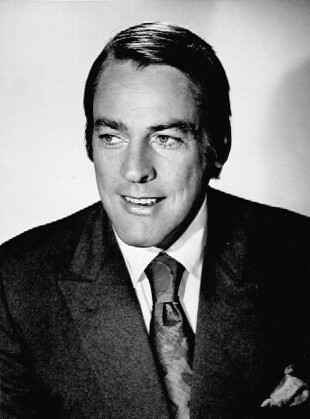
- McCarthy in 1969
- Born: February 15, 1914; Seattle, Washington, U.S.
- Died: September 11, 2010 (aged 96); Hyannis, Massachusetts, U.S.
- Education: University of Minnesota
- Occupation: Actor
- Years active: 1937–2010
- Spouses: Augusta Dabney (m. 1941; div. 1961); Kate Crane (m. 1979–2010)
- Children: 5
- Relatives: Mary McCarthy (sister)

Kevin McCarthy (February 15, 1914 – September 11, 2010) was an American stage, film and television actor, remembered as the male lead in the horror science fiction film Invasion of the Body Snatchers (1956).

Following several television guest roles, McCarthy gave his first credited film performance in Death of a Salesman (1951), portraying Biff Loman to Fredric March's Willy Loman. The role earned him a Golden Globe Award and a nomination for the Academy Award for Best Supporting Actor.

== Early life ==
McCarthy was born in Seattle, Washington, the son of Roy Winfield McCarthy and Martha Therese (née Preston). His father was descended from a wealthy Irish American family based in Minnesota. His mother was born in Washington State to a Protestant father and a non-observant Jewish mother; McCarthy's mother converted to Roman Catholicism before her marriage. He was the brother of author Mary McCarthy, and a distant cousin of U.S. Senator and presidential candidate Eugene McCarthy of Minnesota. His parents both died in the 1918 flu pandemic, and the four children went to live with relatives in Minneapolis. After five years of near-Dickensian mistreatment, described in Mary McCarthy's memoirs, the children were separated: Mary lived with their maternal grandparents, and Kevin and his younger brothers were raised by relatives in Minneapolis. McCarthy graduated in 1932 from Campion High School in Prairie du Chien, Wisconsin, then attended the University of Minnesota, where he appeared in his first play, Shakespeare's Henry IV, Part 1, and discovered a love of acting.

== Career ==
=== Early career and military service ===
During his service in World War II in the United States Army Air Forces, McCarthy appeared in the AAF play Winged Victory and its 1944 film adaptation. McCarthy also appeared in a number of training films.

On 3/2/1987, Ray Loynd wrote in the Los Angeles Times. "He was a founding member of the Actors Studio, even before Lee Strasberg joined it in 1947. It was there that he struck up friendships with Montgomery Clift and Marlon Brando. He also appeared with Brando in Harold Clurman’s 1948 production of “Truck Line Cafe.”

=== Breakthrough in film ===
McCarthy was a founding member of The Actors Studio. McCarthy's breakthrough film role was in Death of a Salesman (1951) portraying Biff Loman to Fredric March's Willy Loman. He had first performed the role in the London theatrical debut and was the only member of that ensemble to be cast in László Benedek's film adaptation. He received good notices for his onscreen work, receiving the Golden Globe Award for New Star of the Year – Actor and a nomination for the Academy Award for Best Supporting Actor.

=== 1956–1975 ===
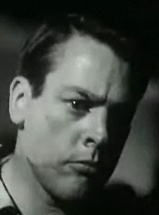
McCarthy in Invasion of the Body Snatchers (1956)

His starring roles include the lead in the science fiction film classic Invasion of the Body Snatchers (1956), which remains the film for which he is most widely known. On television, he starred in the short-lived series The Survivors (1969) with Lana Turner. He also appeared as a guest star in many television programs, playing a wide variety of character roles.

McCarthy acted with Alexis Smith in the NBC anthology series The Joseph Cotten Show in the episode "We Who Love Her" (1956). He was cast in an episode of the religion anthology series Crossroads. McCarthy appeared in the 1959 episode "The Wall Between" of CBS's The DuPont Show with June Allyson. He guest-starred in a classic episode of CBS's The Twilight Zone entitled "Long Live Walter Jameson" (1960) as the title character.

McCarthy made two appearances on The Rifleman, starring Chuck Connors and Johnny Crawford. He portrayed the historical Mark Twain in "The Shattered Idol" (episode 120; original air date: December 4, 1961) and Winslow Quince in "Suspicion" (episode 157; original air date: January 14, 1963). The Rifleman – Season 4 Episodes The Rifleman – Suspicion, Episode 157, Season 5

In 1963, McCarthy appeared in the ABC medical drama Breaking Point in the episode titled "Fire and Ice". He guest starred in the ABC drama Going My Way about the Roman Catholic priesthood in New York City. He was cast as well in a 1964 episode of the NBC drama Mr. Novak with James Franciscus. In 1966, McCarthy appeared in the episode "Wife Killer" of the ABC adventure series The Fugitive. In 1967, he guest starred in the episode "Never Chase a Rainbow" of NBC's western series The Road West, starring Barry Sullivan. Also that year, he guest-starred in the episode "The Watchers" on the television series The Invaders.

In 1968, McCarthy guest starred on Hawaii Five-O in the episode "Full Fathom Five" as the chief antagonist, Victor Reese. He appeared as Maj. Gen Kroll in "The Night of the Doomsday Formula" in season 4 of The Wild Wild West. In 1971, he guest-starred in the "Conqueror's Gold" episode of Bearcats!, which starred Rod Taylor, with whom McCarthy had appeared in the films A Gathering of Eagles, Hotel, and The Hell With Heroes.

=== 1975–1996 ===
In 1976, McCarthy starred in the Broadway play Poor Murderer. In 1977, he and Clu Gulager, previously cast with Barry Sullivan on NBC's The Tall Man, appeared in the episode "The Army Deserter" of the NBC western series The Oregon Trail with Rod Taylor. In 1978, McCarthy played a cameo role in a remake of Invasion of the Body Snatchers as a man running through the streets shouting a warning in the same manner as his character did in the original 1956 film. He appeared in NBC's Flamingo Road (1980–1982) as Claude Weldon, father of Morgan Fairchild's character. McCarthy appeared as Judge Crandall in The Midnight Hour, a 1985 comedy horror television film. Also that year, he guest-starred in a fourth-season episode of The A-Team called "Members Only".

In 1978, McCarthy began performing the one-man touring show Give 'em Hell Harry, which he performed for over 20 years, taking it to every state but Alaska and South Dakota. In a Los Angeles Times article of 3/2/1987, Ray Loynd quoted McCarthy about his approach to the character, saying, "What he represents is Mr. Ordinary Citizen who can achieve great things. His life should be an incentive to the man who thinks he can’t make it."

Then, Loynd continues, "Meanwhile, the day after he wraps Truman in Pasadena, McCarthy will head to Germany to shoot additional scenes for the jumbo $50-million NBC miniseries, “Poor Little Rich Girl,” starring Farrah Fawcett as late heiress Barbara Hutton. McCarthy plays her father, the brother of E. F. Hutton."

McCarthy was one of four actors (with Dick Miller, Belinda Balaski and Robert Picardo) often cast by director Joe Dante. McCarthy's most notable role in Dante's films was in 1987 as the prime antagonist, Victor Scrimshaw, in Innerspace. He also appeared in Dante's films Matinee, and Looney Tunes: Back in Action, the latter film even featuring McCarthy referencing his role in Invasion of the Body Snatchers.

In 1988, McCarthy played R.J. Fletcher, the antagonistic television station owner competing with "Weird" Al Yankovic's George Newman, an aimless young man who is tapped to run a failing UHF television station by his uncle, on the suggestion of his aunt, in the film UHF directed by Jay Levey.

In 1996, he played Gordon Fitzpatrick in The Pandora Directive, a full-motion video (FMV) adventure game starring Tex Murphy.

=== 21st century ===
In 2007, McCarthy appeared as himself in the Anthony Hopkins film Slipstream, which made references to McCarthy's film Invasion of the Body Snatchers.

On October 24, 2009, McCarthy was honored at the Fort Lauderdale International Film Festival.

His last role in a feature-length movie was as The Grand Inquisitor in the sci-fi musical comedy The Ghastly Love of Johnny X (2012).

== Personal life and death ==
McCarthy was married to Augusta Dabney, with whom he had three children, from 1941 until their divorce in 1961. In 1979, he married Kate Crane, who survived him. The couple had two children.

From 1942, McCarthy and his wife Augusta Dabney had a close friendship with actor Montgomery Clift. McCarthy and Clift were cast in a play together, Ramon Naya's Mexican Mural. They became best friends, acted together in several more projects, and were believed by some prominent individuals, including Tennessee Williams, Truman Capote and George Whitmore, to have been lovers. They also collaborated on a screenplay for a film adaptation of the Tennessee Williams/Donald Windham play You Touched Me!, but it never came to fruition.

McCarthy died of pneumonia on September 11, 2010, at Cape Cod Hospital in Massachusetts, at the age of 96.

== Selected filmography ==
- 1944 Winged Victory as Ronnie Meade (uncredited)
- 1951 Death of a Salesman as Biff Loman
- 1954 Drive a Crooked Road as Steve Norris, Bank Robber
- 1954 The Gambler from Natchez as André Rivage
- 1955 Stranger on Horseback as Tom Bannerman
- 1955 An Annapolis Story as Jim R. Scott
- 1956 Invasion of the Body Snatchers as Dr. Miles Bennell
- 1956 Nightmare as Stan Grayson
- 1958 Diamond Safari as Harry Jordan
- 1960 The Twilight Zone (TV Series) as Professor Walter Jameson / Tom Bowen / Major Hugh Skelton
- 1961 The Misfits as Raymond Tabor
- 1961 The Rifleman as Mark Twain
- 1961 'Way Out (TV Series) as Dr. Paul Sandham
- 1962 40 Pounds of Trouble as Louie Blanchard
- 1963 A Gathering of Eagles as General Jack 'Happy Jack' Kirby
- 1963 The Rifleman as Winslow Quince
- 1963 An Affair of the Skin as Allen McCleod
- 1963 The Prize as Dr. John Garrett
- 1964 The Best Man as Dick Jensen
- 1965 Mirage as Sylvester Josephson
- 1966 A Big Hand for the Little Lady as Otto Habershaw
- 1966 The Three Sisters as Vershinin
- 1967 Twelve O'Clock High S03E02 "Massacre"
- 1967 Hotel as Curtis O'Keefe
- 1968 The Hell with Heroes as Colonel Wilson
- 1968 If He Hollers, Let Him Go! as Leslie Whitlock
- 1968 Ace High as Drake
- 1968 The High Chaparral (TV Series) as Jim Forrest (North to Tucson)
- 1968–1976 Hawaii Five-O (TV Series) as Hunter R. Hickey / Victor Reese
- 1969–1970 Harold Robbins' The Survivors (TV Series) as Philip Hastings
- 1971 Mission: Impossible (TV Series) as Whitmore Channing
- 1972 Between Time and Timbuktu as Bokonon
- 1972 Richard as Washington Doctor
- 1972 Kansas City Bomber as Burt Henry
- 1973 Columbo (TV Series) as Dr. Frank Simmons
- 1974 June Moon (TV Series) as Hart
- 1974 Alien Thunder as Sergeant Malcolm Grant
- 1975 Order to Assassinate as Ed McLean
- 1976 Buffalo Bill and the Indians, or Sitting Bull's History Lesson as Major Burke
- 1977 Mary Jane Harper Cried Last Night (TV Movie) as Tom Atherton
- 1978 Piranha as Dr. Robert Hoak
- 1978 Invasion of the Body Snatchers as Running Man (cameo appearance)
- 1980 Hero at Large as Calvin Donnelly
- 1980 Those Lips, Those Eyes as Mickey Bellinger
- 1981 The Howling as Fred Francis
- 1983 My Tutor as Mr. Chrystal
- 1983 Twilight Zone: The Movie as Uncle Walt (segment "It's a Good Life")
- 1983 Making of a Male Model as Ward Hawley
- 1984 Invitation to Hell (TV Movie) as Mr. Thompson
- 1985 The Midnight Hour (TV Movie) as Judge Crandall
- 1986 A Masterpiece of Murder (TV Movie) as Jonathan Hire
- 1986 The Golden Girls as Richard (Second Motherhood)
- 1987 Innerspace as Victor Eugene Scrimshaw
- 1987 Hostage as Colonel Tim Shaw
- 1987 Poor Little Rich Girl: The Barbara Hutton Story (TV Movie) as Franklyn Hutton
- 1988 Once Upon a Texas Train (TV Movie) as The Governor
- 1987 Dark Tower as Sergie
- 1989 Fast Food as Judge Reinholte
- 1989 UHF as R.J. Fletcher
- 1990 The Sleeping Car as Vincent Tuttle
- 1990 Ghoulies III: Ghoulies Go to College (Video) as Professor Ragnar
- 1991 Eve of Destruction as William Simmons (uncredited)
- 1991 Final Approach as General Geller
- 1992 The Distinguished Gentleman as Terry Corrigan
- 1993 Matinee as General Ankrum (uncredited)
- 1994 Greedy as Bartlett
- 1994 Judicial Consent as Judge Pollan
- 1995 Just Cause as Phil Prentiss
- 1995 Liz: The Elizabeth Taylor Story as Sol Siegel
- 1995 Steal Big Steal Little as Reed Tyler
- 1995 Mommy as Fire Department Rescuer
- 1996 The Pandora Directive (Video Game) as Gordon Fitzpatrick
- 1998 Addams Family Reunion (TV Movie) as Grandpa Addams
- 2002 The Legend of Razorback as Zondervan
- 2003 Looney Tunes: Back in Action as Dr. Miles Bennell (cameo)
- 2006 Loving Annabelle as Father Harris
- 2006 Fallen Angels as Pastor Waltz
- 2007 Slipstream as Himself
- 2007 Trail of the Screaming Forehead as Latecomer
- 2008 The Boneyard Collection
- 2008 Her Morbid Desires (Video) as The Monk
- 2009 Wesley as Bishop Ryder
- 2012 The Ghastly Love of Johnny X as The Grand Inquisitor (final film role, posthumous release)

== Radio appearances ==
Year	Program	Episode/source
1952	Theatre Guild on the Air	The Damask Check
1953	Radio Playhouse	Routine Assignment
