= Runaway Daughters (1994 film) =

- Written by: Lou Rusoff; Charles S. Haas
- Directed by: Joe Dante
- Starring: Julie Bowen; Holly Fields; Jenny Lewis; Paul Rudd; Chris Young
- Music by: Hummie Mann
- Country of origin: United States
- Original language: English

Production
- Producers: Lou Arkoff; David Giler; Debra Hill; Willie Kutner
- Cinematography: Richard Bowen
- Editor: Mark Helfrich
- Running time: 83 minutes
- Production companies: Drive-In Classics; Showtime Networks

Original release
- Network: Showtime
- Release: August 12, 1994

Runaway Daughters is a 1994 television film directed by Joe Dante that originally aired on the cable television network Showtime as part of the anthology series Rebel Highway. It is a loose remake of Runaway Daughters, an American International Pictures production from 1956, the year in which both the original and the remake are set. Much of the cast of Dante's The Howling is reunited on this film, including Christopher Stone, Dee Wallace, Robert Picardo, Dick Miller, and Belinda Balaski.

== Plot ==
The title characters are Angie Gordon, Mary Nicholson, and Laura Cahn. Their picaresque adventure begins in 1956 when Mary has a pregnancy scare after letting Bob Randolph go too far with her. Mr. Russoff, named for Lou Rusoff who wrote the screenplay of the original version, is a widower from the wrong side of the tracks, and he seeks to cover his tracks by enlisting in the United States Navy. Angie and Laura accompany Mary in a flight from the suburbs as she decides what to do about her pregnancy. Along the way, they meet bully cops and redneck survivalists with rifles.

== Cast ==
- Julie Bowen as Angie Gordon
- Holly Fields as Mary Nicholson
- Jenny Lewis as Laura Cahn
- Dick Miller as Roy Farrell
- Paul Rudd as Jimmy Rusoff
- Chris Young as Bob Randolph

== Production ==
The Gordons are played by the Stones, the Nicholsons by Balaski and Innerspace's Joe Flaherty, and the Cahns played by Picardo and Wendy Schaal, also both late of Innerspace. Dick Miller plays Roy Farrell, a private detective hired to find the girls. Also in small roles are Dante regular Mark McCraken and the producer of the original version, Samuel Z. Arkoff. Roger Corman, along with his wife, Julie Corman, play the parents of the boyfriend of one of the title characters.

The script was written by Charles S. Haas and in many ways is a companion piece to his previous collaboration with Dante, Matinee.

Fabian Forte, who was under contract to AIP in the sixties, has a small role.

== Release ==
The film originally aired on Showtime on August 12, 1994.

== Home media ==
The film was released on DVD in March 2005.
