= Charles S. Haas =

American screenwriter

- Born: October 22, 1952 (age 73); Brooklyn, New York, U.S.
- Occupations: Actor, screenwriter, novelist
- Years active: 1979–present

Charles Stephen Haas (born October 22, 1952), also known as Charles Haas or Charlie Haas, is an American screenwriter, actor, and novelist.

== Biography ==
Haas was born in Brooklyn, the son of Eunice (née Dillon) and Philip Haas, who was an attorney. Haas began his writing career with the film Over the Edge (1979). It was co-written with Tim Hunter and starred Matt Dillon. He later worked on Martians Go Home (1989) starring Randy Quaid.

At around this time he was approached to write the script to the film Gremlins 2: The New Batch (1990), which was directed by Joe Dante and produced by Michael Finnell. Haas also had a small acting role in the film as one of the scientists. Haas later took part in recording the DVD commentary for that film, and it was noted that it was Haas's idea to set that film in New York City. Haas would later work with Dante and Finnell again, writing the script for and appearing in the film Matinee (1993), also work with Dante again on developing a script titled Termite Terrace, based on Chuck Jones' start at Warner Brothers in the 1930s, the project ultimately never made it to the pre-production stages as Warner Bros. chose to make Space Jam instead.

Haas wrote the 2009 novel The Enthusiast, which was published by HarperCollins. He also wrote a humor piece for The New Yorker in April 2010. In 2022, he presented a new novel, Sunland, as twelve serialized episodes of The Last We Fake fiction podcast. In October 2024, Haas published his second novel, The Current Fantasy.

== Filmography ==
=== Film ===
Year	Title	Writer	Actor	Role
1979	Over the Edge	Yes	No	—
1982	Tex	Yes	Yes	Lee
1989	Martians Go Home	Yes	No	—
1990	Gremlins 2: The New Batch	Yes	Yes	Casper
1993	Matinee	Yes	Yes	Mr. Elroy

=== Television ===
Year	Title	Notes
1985	Reckless Disregard	Television film
1989	Gang of Four	Unsold pilot
1994	Rebel Highway	Episode: Runaway Daughters

== Bibliography ==
- The Enthusiast (2009)
- "Seder, the Sundance movie". Shouts & Murmurs. The New Yorker. 86 (8): 34. April 5, 2010.
- The Current Fantasy (2024)
