= John Hora =

American cinematographer (1940–2021)

- Born: John Charles Hora; February 16, 1940; Pasadena, California
- Died: February 9, 2021 (aged 80); Los Angeles, California
- Years active: 1973–2012

John Charles Hora (February 16, 1940 – February 9, 2021) was an American cinematographer and actor.

== Life and career ==
Hora was born in Pasadena in 1940; his father was an amateur still photographer, and his grandfather ran an photography studio in Missouri.

As a cinematographer, Hora worked with director Joe Dante in numerous films. He also served as cinematographer for Michael Jackson's 1988 film Moonwalker and for the pilot for the television series Eerie, Indiana.

As an actor, Hora performed in Dante's film Innerspace, and later appeared in Honey, I Blew Up the Kid (Which he also worked as the director of photography).

Hora also worked for The Los Angeles Film School and as secretary for the American Society of Cinematographers. In May 2005 he was honored by the magazine American Cinematographer.

== Death ==
Hora died unexpectedly from heart failure on February 9, 2021, in Los Angeles, California. He was 80 years old.

== Filmography ==
Film

Year	Title	Director
1973	Maurie	Daniel Mann
1978	The Further Adventures of the Wilderness Family	Frank Zuniga
1981	The Howling	Joe Dante
1981	Liar's Moon	David Fisher
1984	Gremlins	Joe Dante
1985	Explorers	Joe Dante
1989	Loverboy	Joan Micklin Silver
1990	Gremlins 2: The New Batch	Joe Dante
1992	Honey, I Blew Up the Kid	Randal Kleiser
1993	Matinee	Joe Dante
1998	God Said, 'Ha!'	Julia Sweeney

Documentary film

Year	Title	Director	Notes
1973	New Gladiators	Bob Hammer	With Allen Daviau

Short film

Year	Title	Director	Notes
1983	It's a Good Life	Joe Dante	Segment of Twilight Zone: The Movie
1988	Smooth Criminal	Colin Chilvers	Segment of Moonwalker
1988	The Jogger	Robert Resnikoff	
2012	In the Picture	David Strohmaier	With Douglas Knapp

Documentary short

Year	Title	Director	Notes
1994	The Journey Inside	Barnaby Jackson	
2012	The Last Days of Cinerama	Mike Celestino; Robert Garren	With Douglas Knapp

Television

Year	Title	Director	Notes
1974	ABC Afterschool Specials	Jack Regas	Episode "Pssst! Hammerman's After You!"
1983	Strange Companions	Frank Zuniga	TV movie
1991	Eerie, Indiana	Joe Dante	Episode "Forever Ware"

Acting roles

Year	Title	Role
1987	Innerspace	Ozzie Wexler
1992	Honey, I Blew Up the Kid	Helicopter Observer
2014	Burying the Ex	Grumpy Customer
