= Runaway Daughters =

Runaway Daughters may refer to:

- Runaway Daughters (1956 film), a film drama
- Runaway Daughters (1994 film), a television film
