= Gremlins 2: The New Batch =

1990 horror comedy film directed by Joe Dante

- Theatrical release poster by Greg Winters
- Directed by: Joe Dante
- Written by: Charles S. Haas
- Based on: Characters created by Chris Columbus
- Produced by: Michael Finnell
- Starring: Zach Galligan; Phoebe Cates; John Glover; Robert J. Prosky; Robert Picardo; Christopher Lee
- Cinematography: John Hora
- Edited by: Kent Beyda
- Music by: Jerry Goldsmith
- Production company: Amblin Entertainment
- Distributed by: Warner Bros.
- Release date: June 15, 1990
- Running time: 106 minutes
- Country: United States
- Language: English
- Budget: $30–50 million
- Box office: $41.5 million (US/Canada)

Gremlins 2: The New Batch is a 1990 American comedy horror film and a sequel to Gremlins (1984). It was directed by Joe Dante from a screenplay by Charles S. Haas and features creature designs by Rick Baker. Zach Galligan, Phoebe Cates, Dick Miller, Jackie Joseph, Keye Luke and the voices of Frank Welker and Howie Mandel reprise their roles from the first film, with John Glover, Robert Prosky, Robert Picardo and Christopher Lee joining the cast. It continues the story of Billy Peltzer and the mogwai Gizmo, the latter of whom spawns more of his kind when wet that eventually become the titular imp-like monsters and proceed to wreak havoc within a skyscraper in New York City.

The film heavily parodies its predecessor, with more cartoonish elements and less horror. There are a number of parodies of other forms of popular culture, including the Rambo franchise, The Wizard of Oz, Marathon Man and The Phantom of the Opera. It was theatrically released by Warner Bros. Pictures on June 15, 1990, and received generally positive reviews. It grossed $42 million on a budget of $30–50 million. Since its release, it has developed a cult following. A third film is set for release on October 6, 2028.

== Plot ==
Following the death of his owner, Sam Wing, Gizmo the mogwai is captured by scientists at the Splice O' Life genetic engineering laboratory at Clamp Center, a state-of-the-art skyscraper in Manhattan owned by eccentric billionaire Daniel Clamp. At the mercy of chief researcher Doctor Cushing Catheter, Gizmo is rescued by his former owner, Billy Peltzer, and his fiancée, Kate Beringer, both of whom work elsewhere in the building. Clamp befriends Billy upon being impressed by his skills in concept design, sparking the interest of Billy's superior, Marla Bloodstone. Gizmo is left in Billy's office, where water from a broken drinking fountain spills onto his head and causes him to spawn a quartet of new mogwai. They detain Gizmo in the air vents and later eat after midnight at the building's food court to become gremlins.

After Gizmo finds his way out of the vents, gremlin Mohawk abducts and tortures him. The other gremlins set off fire sprinklers to spawn an army of them that throws the building into turmoil. Billy attempts to lure the gremlins into the lobby, where sunlight will kill them; after briefing Clamp on gremlin knowledge, he exits through a secret route to cover the building's entrance with a giant sheet depicting night to deceive the creatures. The gremlins drink genetic serums in the lab; one gains high intelligence, another becomes female and a third is transformed into a being of pure electricity that murders Catheter before Billy traps it in the building's telephone system. All the while, television host "Grandpa Fred" films the incident, aided by Japanese tourist Mr. Katsuji.

Murray Futterman, Billy's neighbor from Kingston Falls who is visiting the city with his wife, Sheila, is attacked by a bat-like mutated gremlin immunized to sunlight by the intelligent one with a sunscreen-like formula. After petrifying it with cement, Futterman realizes he has proved his sanity and must help; when Clamp exits the building via his secret route, Futterman follows to sneak inside and aid Billy. Chief of security Frank Forster teams up with Billy, but the enamored female gremlin, nicknamed Greta, chases the former off. Kate and Marla are attacked by Mohawk, now mutated into a centaur-like spider hybrid after drinking another serum, but Gizmo saves them by killing him using a makeshift arrow topped with an ignited bottle of correction fluid.

When the plan to stop the gremlins is foiled due to the sudden occurrence of a storm, Billy instead directs Futterman to spray the gremlins with a fire hose, then releases the electrical one to melt them all. Clamp soon charges in with the authorities and press, only to discover that the threat has been neutralized; thrilled by the outcome, he promotes Billy, Kate, Fred and Marla and hires Katsuji as a camera operator as the former two return home with Gizmo. Forster contacts Clamp to notify him that he is trapped on the building's highest floor, where Greta, the sole gremlin survivor, corners and entices him to marry her.

== Cast ==
- Zach Galligan as Billy Peltzer
- Phoebe Cates as Kate Beringer
- John Glover as Daniel Clamp
- Robert Prosky as Grandpa Fred
- Robert Picardo as Frank Forster, chief of Clamp Center's security
- Christopher Lee as Doctor Cushing Catheter
- Haviland Morris as Marla Bloodstone
- Dick Miller as Murray Futterman
- Jackie Joseph as Sheila Futterman
- Gedde Watanabe as Mr. Katsuji
- Keye Luke as Sam Wing
- Kathleen Freeman as Microwave Marge
- Don and Dan Stanton as Martin and Lewis, Catheter's assistants
- Jason Presson as Alex, a frozen yogurt-selling clerk
- Belinda Balaski as a mother at a movie theater that the film is being shown at. Balaski played Mrs. Harris in the first film.
- John Capodice as a fire chief
- Paul Bartel as the movie theater's manager
- Kenneth Tobey as a theater projectionist. Tobey played the filling station attendant in the first film.
- Julia Sweeney as Peggy, the lab receptionist
- Charles S. Haas as Casper, Catheter's other assistant
- Leonard Maltin as himself
- Hulk Hogan as himself

The film has various crew and guest cameos: Alex Leam as a customer receiving his ordered frozen yogurt, the film's composer Jerry Goldsmith as another frozen yogurt patron, John Astin as a janitor and Henry Gibson as an employee fired for smoking. Rick Ducommun cameos as a security guard and director Joe Dante as the director of Grandpa Fred's show. Dick Butkus and Bubba Smith cameo as themselves. The cast of PBS' Square One Television appear as themselves filming an episode in Clamp Center's lobby. Dean Norris and Raymond Cruz appear in the film as a SWAT team member and delivery man, respectively. Joel Brooks plays a Canadian restaurant's waiter.

=== Voices ===
- Howie Mandel as Gizmo
- Tony Randall as the intelligent gremlin (credited as "The Brain Gremlin")
- Frank Welker as Mohawk
- Kirk Thatcher and Mark Dodson as the gremlins
- Jeff Bergman as Bugs Bunny, Daffy Duck and Porky Pig
- Neil Ross as Clamp Center's intercom announcements
- Chad Everett as John Wayne

== Looney Tunes segments ==
The film includes animated segments written and directed by Chuck Jones, animated by Warner Bros. Animation and Chuck Jones Enterprises and featuring Looney Tunes characters Bugs Bunny, Daffy Duck and Porky Pig. Jones had retired from animation before returning to work on Gremlins 2: The New Batch. Dante explained the animation at the beginning of the film was meant to "set the anarchic tone".

The first segment initiates the film and features the classic Looney Tunes opening card, leading to the assumption that this is a cartoon being shown alongside the film; however, when Bugs appears through the rings atop the Warner Bros. shield, Daffy interrupts the sequence and pulls Bugs away from the shield, striving to recreate the opening with himself in Bugs' place. Unfortunately, the shield overshoots, causing the entire card to fall apart and become stuck around Daffy's waist. An annoyed Daffy then ascertains that since he will not star in the cartoon, they might as well just skip straight to the film. Bugs happily obliges by spinning Daffy away from the screen like a spinning top, making way for the film's title to appear.

The DVD and Blu-ray release of the film include a longer version of the cartoon short. In it, Daffy is informed by Bugs that he has been promoted to executive and is subsequently put in charge of writing the title of the movie. When Daffy mistakenly writes the title Gremlins 2 as "Gremlin Stew", Bugs corrects the error. Daffy then attempts to rename the film The Return of Super-Daffy Meets Gremlins 2 Part 6: The Movie, but Bugs rejects this for being too long, changing it back to Gremlins 2 (rendered in the font of the official logo). Daffy then quits his new job and Bugs decides to add a subtitle, saying it looks "a little skimpy" without one. This material was removed from the theatrical release because early audiences expected a live-action film and were bewildered by the lengthy animated sequence.

Throughout the film's credits, Daffy pops into frame sporadically and spouts off sarcastic comments. The last segment appears afterwards and again features the Looney Tunes rings. This time, Porky comes out of the rings and tries to say his usual "Th-th-th-that's all, folks!", but Daffy interrupts and takes over again. After Daffy says the slogan, the back of the Warner Bros. shield – with the credits "Title Animation Written & Directed by Chuck Jones", as well as featuring his signature – smashes him. He then peeks his head out on the left side and says, "Fade out.", as the segment concludes.

== Production ==
The original Gremlins was a financial success, and Warner Bros. asked its director Joe Dante to make a sequel straight away. Dante declined, because he saw Gremlins as having a proper ending, and thus a sequel would only be meant to be profitable. Moreover, the original film was a taxing experience for Dante, and he wanted to move on. Work on Gremlins 2: The New Batch continued without him, as the studio approached various directors and writers. Storylines considered included sending the gremlins to cities like Las Vegas or even the planet Mars. After these ideas fell through, the studio returned to Dante, who agreed to make the sequel after receiving the rare promise of having complete creative control over the movie; he also received a budget triple that of the original film. Dante later acknowledged that by this point too much time had passed between the films, thus possibly reducing public interest in a Gremlins sequel.

Principal photography commenced in New York City on May 26, 1989, and ended in September. As the filmmakers noted, this was a time when cable television, genetics and frozen yogurt were becoming more common in popular culture, hence are all parodied in the movie.

=== Plotting ===
With more control over the film, Dante engineered a project that he later referred to as "one of the more unconventional studio pictures, ever." Dante included some material that he believed Warner Bros. would not have allowed had they not wanted a sequel to Gremlins. Allowed to break a number of rules in filmmaking, he also later claimed it was the film into which he had put the most of his personal influence. Dante imagined Gremlins 2: The New Batch as a satire of Gremlins and sequels in general.

Screenwriter Charlie Haas introduced the concept of moving the gremlins to New York City and a corporate head (Daniel Clamp) as Billy's boss. When the Warner Bros. executives grew concerned about the expense of portraying the gremlins attacking an entire city, Haas came up with the idea of confining the action within Clamp's "smart building". Haas also included a great deal of material in his screenplay that proved too elaborate to produce, including having a cow–hamster hybrid running on a treadmill in the laboratory.

In keeping with Dante's desires to satirize the original film, the sequel has some meta-references and self-referential humor. These include a cameo appearance by film critic Leonard Maltin. He holds up a copy of the original Gremlins home video and denounces it, just as he had in reality; however, his rant is cut short when gremlins assault him. Partly for this scene, one academic called Dante "one of contemporary cinema's great pranksters."

Additionally, when Billy is trying to explain the rules regarding the mogwai to staff in the building, the staff finds them quite absurd and derisively interrogates Billy on their precise meaning, at one point considering the thought experiment of a mogwai in a plane which crosses a time zone. This scene originates from the fact that the filmmakers themselves saw the rules as irrational and some questions in the scene were based upon those raised by fans of the original film.

At one point in the film, Dante attempted to involve his audience in the story by making it seem as if the gremlins had taken control of a movie theater where the film is being shown. In the scene, the theater's projector becomes sabotaged by the gremlins, who then engage in shadow play over the blank projection screen before showing the vintage nudie film Volleyball Holiday in their origin film's place. Hulk Hogan, who is in attendance in the auditorium in a cameo appearance, intimidates the gremlins into running the rest of the film. This joke was inspired by a similar stunt in William Castle's The Tingler (1959). The studio feared that people might leave the theatre if they thought the film had broken; Dante therefore secured the inclusion of the sequence by assembling some people for a preview of the film. When the scene was shown, the real-life audience found it enjoyable and stayed in the theatre. Dante later described this scene as one of the most widely enjoyed jokes in the film.

When the film made its debut on home video, the theatrical version was kept intact for the LaserDisc release, but for the VHS and Japanese LaserDisc releases, the filmmakers replaced the scene to make it seem as if the viewer's VCR had been sabotaged by the gremlins. In this version, the gremlins do their shadow puppetry over white noise before changing the VCR's channels. Their antics stop at a broadcast of Chisum, where John Wayne forces the gremlins into continuing the film, although voice impersonation was needed due to Wayne's passing in 1979; actor Chad Everett was recommended by Wayne's son, Patrick Wayne. Notably, a clip from the Looney Tunes cartoon Falling Hare appears in this version. Also featured is a clip of the opening titles of the KTHV local newscast at the time in Little Rock, Arkansas. These sequences occur in lieu of the Hulk Hogan sequence which also featured Paul Bartel. The later DVD and Blu-ray releases include both the theatrical version and the reworked VHS scene as a bonus feature.

The original version of the film was longer, but executive producer Steven Spielberg claimed that there were too many gremlins and several scenes were cut as a result. One deleted scene portrayed three of the main gremlins, Daffy, Lenny and George, sneaking into television host Grandpa Fred's studio and "helping" him host, acting on the premise that Grandpa Fred's show was intended to be scary (though this scene was later included in the tie-in novel).

=== Casting ===
Several actors from the original film returned to make Gremlins 2: The New Batch, including Galligan, Cates and Dick Miller. Miller reprised his role as Billy's neighbor Murray Futterman, who the gremlins severely injured, both physically and mostly mentally, in the first film, in an expanded role in this film. In the second, he plays a part in wiping out the creatures by dousing one in cement and using the building's fire hose against the others. Character actress Jackie Joseph returned to play Mr. Futterman's wife, and there were also brief reappearances in the movie theatre sequence from Belinda Balaski as a complaining mother and Kenneth Tobey as the projectionist. Keye Luke also returned to play Mr. Wing, Gizmo's original owner. When Luke heard his character would die in Gremlins 2: The New Batch, he quipped, "Remember, when you make Gremlins 3, I'm a flashback!". Hoyt Axton was meant to return as Billy's father, the inventor. He would have appeared at the end of the film, having designed special clothing for Gizmo that would ensure Gizmo would never come into contact with water again. At the last moment, the filmmakers decided not to shoot the scene to reduce time.

New performers included Robert Picardo, who had previously worked with Dante and producer Michael Finnell in films such as The Howling (1981) and Innerspace (1987). He plays Forster, one of Billy's crueler bosses. Robert Prosky played Grandpa Fred, a television host, and his character was based upon Al Lewis's character Grandpa Munster. Joe Dante has a brief cameo as the director of Grandpa Fred's show. John Glover played Clamp (character based upon Donald Trump and Ted Turner) and brought to the role an enthusiastic innocence that overrode the fact that his character had been written as a villain, which Dante thought lightened the film in general.

Christopher Lee (who previously worked with Spielberg in 1941) portrayed the Splice O' Life's head scientist, Doctor Cushing Catheter. Lee imagined his character as light-hearted; but Dante encouraged him to portray him as evil to better match the atmosphere of the laboratory set. Lee was revered on the set for his experience. In a deleted scene, Catheter examines a bat injected with the sunscreen-like formula that would later be used on the bat-like gremlin. He then says to his colleague, "I'm told they sometimes feed on blood"; this is a reference to Lee's performances as Count Dracula in the Hammer Horror films. Later, as the bat-like gremlin is transforming, Catheter experiences déjà vu while Dracula music is heard. The character's first name, Cushing, is a reference to Lee's frequent Hammer co-star and best friend, Peter Cushing.

Leonard Maltin, a film critic for Entertainment Tonight, had given a negative review to the first Gremlins film. While Dante was initially hurt by the review, he invited Maltin to film a cameo as the film critic of a fictional Clamp Cable Network show, The Movie Police. Maltin gives a snide review for the video re-release of the first film along the lines of his original review before being assaulted by some gremlins as he attempts to change his mind.

=== Special effects ===
Director Joe Dante (left) holds a cardboard "Bat Gremlin", with actor Dick Miller (arms raised). A stop motion model replaced the cardboard gremlin in post-production.

For special effects, the original film relied on Chris Walas, who moved on to pursue a directing career. Dante turned to Academy Award-winner Rick Baker to create the effects for Gremlins 2: The New Batch. Baker was not interested, as he saw Gremlins 2: The New Batch as too much work for a project in which he would not be the creator but rather a successor to Walas. He was eventually persuaded to accept the job when it was suggested he could make the gremlins and mogwai more diverse.

In the first film, when Gizmo multiplied, his offspring closely resembled himself, except for the leader, Stripe. Here, the four mogwai Gizmo produces each possess their own distinct personalities and physical features. Additionally, each mogwai has a name, although the names were used in the script and never spoken aloud in the film. Two of the mogwais were George, black without a stripe and a caricature of Edward G. Robinson and Lenny, buck-toothed, named after the principal characters in Of Mice and Men, whom they resemble in both appearance and demeanor. Daffy was named for his manic behavior, and the leader, Mohawk, for his mohawk hairstyle. Based on the original film's character, Stripe, Frank Welker also voices Mohawk. While both the mogwai and gremlin versions of Stripe had fur stripes, Baker hit upon the idea of giving the Mohawk mogwai a fur stripe and giving the Mohawk gremlin something scalier. Gizmo was also redesigned; the puppet was generally larger and its design was simplified. Dante commented Gizmo may look less real in Gremlins 2: The New Batch, but the result was that Gizmo could convey more emotion.

Later on, when the mogwai metamorphose into gremlins and multiply, they further diversify by running amok in the Splice O' Life laboratory and ingesting various serums. One becomes bat-like, in addition to being immunized to sunlight. Mohawk becomes part-spider. One becomes part-vegetable (Vegetable Gremlin, as Dante named it) and another turns into a female gremlin, referred to in at least one script as the "Girl Gremlin" and in the official trading card series and other promotional materials as "Lady Gremlina" with shiny red lips and mascara. Nowadays she is referred to as "Greta", after the late Greta Garbo. Yet another has acid thrown onto his face, quickly presenting a mask of the Phantom of the Opera.

As with the first, puppetry was involved, and some of the puppets were mechanical. An actor holding a puppet would have to have wires strapped to him. Gremlins 2 also includes more stop motion animation than the first film; the Bat Gremlin was portrayed through some stop motion animation. Film technology since the original had improved, and as a result the creatures can be seen walking more. Gizmo is able to dance, although this scene took the longest to make. Because there are more gremlins in Gremlins 2 than the original, additional filming lasted five months. Many of the effects had to be completed after the actors had finished their work.

For the gremlins' voices, Howie Mandel returned as the voice of Gizmo, Frank Welker provided the voice for Mohawk, while Tony Randall provided the voice of the Brain Gremlin, Joe Dante provided voices for the Beanie Gremlin and the Witch Gremlin, Nancy McConnor provided the voice for the Bat Gremlin, Mark Dodson provided voices for George, Lenny, Daffy and Greta and Kirk Thatcher provided voices for most of the gremlins, alongside Welker.

=== Music ===
Gremlins 2: The New Batch

Film score by Jerry Goldsmith
- Released: August 31, 1990; June 22, 2015 (25th Anniversary Edition)
- Recorded: 1990
- Genre: Soundtrack
- Length: 39:25 (original); 76:27 (Expansion)

As with the first film, the music in Gremlins 2: The New Batch was composed and conducted by Jerry Goldsmith, who also has a cameo in the film alongside his wife, and performed by the Hollywood Studio Symphony. The song "I'm Ready" by Fats Domino was put into the film after singer Billy Idol denied the filmmakers the right to use the song "Dancing with Myself", so Joe Dante had to find a song that fit the beat that Gizmo was dancing to. In the latter half of the film, Gizmo, inspired by the Rambo films and tired of the abuse he has suffered at the hands of the gremlins, takes revenge on Mohawk. Gizmo shoots the Mohawk spider-gremlin with a makeshift bow and flaming arrow. For the scene in which Gizmo prepares for this move, Goldsmith – who had also authored the music in the Rambo films – employed a variant of Gizmo's theme in the style of the Rambo theme. The soundtrack was released August 31, 1990 through Varèse Sarabande and features twelve tracks of score at a running time just under forty minutes. On June 22, 2015, an expanded release came from the same label.

The scene featuring Mohawk transforming into a spider-like monster features a portion of the song "Angel of Death" by thrash metal band Slayer. In another scene, the Brain Gremlin leads hundreds of gremlins to sing "New York, New York". Dante claimed that "The musical number is a shameless steal" from the film Dames (1934).

==== Song list ====
- Fats Domino – "I'm Ready"
- Jeff Beck – "Sling Shot"
- Jeff Beck – "Situation"
- Slayer – "Angel of Death"
- Tony Randall – "New York, New York"
- Bach – Air on the G String
- Thompson Twins – "Bombers in the Sky"
- Damn Yankees – "Damn Yankees"
- Jasmine Guy – "Tuff Boy"
- Private Life – "Touch Me"
- Gordon Lightfoot – "If You Could Read My Mind"
- Faith No More – "Surprise! You're Dead!"
- George Gershwin – "Rhapsody in Blue"

== Reception ==
=== Box office ===
Gremlins 2: The New Batch did not perform as well at the box office as the original. The film was released into US theatres on June 15, 1990 on the same day as Dick Tracy. In its first weekend it made $9,702,804, and it ultimately made $41,482,207. It was thus only the thirty-first highest-grossing film of the year, behind a few other films in the comedy, horror or fantasy genre, such as Back to the Future Part III ($87,727,583), Edward Scissorhands ($56,362,352), and Arachnophobia ($53,208,180). It did, however, outperform Predator 2 ($30,669,413), Child's Play 2 ($28,501,605) and The Exorcist III ($26,098,824).

Gremlins 2: The New Batch also played in other countries. Canadian audiences reportedly enjoyed one scene where Billy and his boss meet at a Canadian-themed restaurant, where the waiters are dressed like the Royal Canadian Mounted Police. The film was released in Norway on July 5, Finland on July 6, Colombia on July 12, and much of Europe in the rest of July, including in the United Kingdom and Spain on July 27. It opened in France and Argentina in August and reached Australia on September 20. It earned £7,400,000 in the United Kingdom.

=== Critical response ===
Film critics varied in their reviews of Gremlins 2: The New Batch. Roger Ebert, who had approved of the first film, observed that Gremlins 2 was meant to satirize sequels. Nevertheless, he felt it did not manage to differentiate itself from the original enough and was not as good. He went on to claim that the film lacks a well-constructed plot, and once the gremlins arrive, the film simply becomes a "series of gags." He thus gave the film two and a half stars, out of a possible four. Hal Hinson of The Washington Post caught on to how the Looney Tunes animation is meant to imply "anarchic wit," but nevertheless felt both the cartoon short and the film itself are failures. He saw the beginning as too slow and, like Ebert, thought the film is too similar to the first. Hinson did, however, approve of the characterization of the gremlins and their version of "New York, New York." He also noted that turning the gremlins against Clamp resembles anti-corporate "poetic justice."

In contrast, while one reviewer for Films in Review, like Ebert, argued the film resembles the original and abandons its plot when the gremlins arrive, he also felt the film's appeal could be found partly in its self-consciousness of these facts and its in-jokes and satire. He also complimented Cates as "wholesomely bewitching," and Galligan as "a suitably naive foil for the scaly fiends." Desson Howe of The Washington Post also approved of the film, including its special effects and the parodies of Trump, Turner, genetics labs, cable television, and the film Marathon Man. Some critics thought the film has qualities the original lacked, such as wit. A critic for National Review called the film "much freer and wittier than the first one," though he felt the sequel shies away from becoming an important piece of satire.

The cover of an issue of Entertainment Weekly in July 1990 also exclaimed that "actor John Glover... and director Joe Dante made Gremlins 2: The New Batch wittier, better, and more subversive than the original." Some critics who found the first film too dark also gave Gremlins 2: The New Batch more positive reviews. Leonard Maltin, who appears in the film, gave it three out of four stars for its references to other films, Glover's imitation of Turner and Trump, and Lee's performance. VideoHound's Golden Movie Retriever gave the film three-and-a-half bones out of four as opposed to the three bones given to the original, stating:

The sequel to "Gremlins" is superior to the original, which was quite good. ... director Dante presents a less violent but far more campy vision, paying myriad surreal tributes to scores of movies, including "The Wizard of Oz" and musical extravaganzas of the past. Also incorporates a Donald Trump parody, takes on TV news, and body-slams modern urban living. Great fun. (Note: The Golden Movie Retriever uses bones as its variation of stars. According to the staff's "Bone Ratings" system, a title given three-and-a-half bones demonstrates "Memorable cinematic fare with flair, verve, polish, sheen, and panache. Easily able to recommend to friends." A title given three bones demonstrates "Good story, fine acting provides decent entertainment return on video investment. Would recommend to family members, even distant cousins.")

An Allmovie critic complimented the sequel by saying the "original's violence and mean-spiritedness are gone, making this follow-up somewhat more kid-friendly."

On Rotten Tomatoes the film has an approval rating of 72% based on 67 reviews, with an average rating of 6.7/10. The site's consensus states; "Gremlins 2 trades the spiky thrills of its predecessor for looney satire, yielding a succession of sporadically clever gags that add some flavor to a recycled plot." Metacritic, which uses a weighted average, assigned the film a score of 69 out of 100, based on 28 critics, indicating "generally favorable" reviews. Audiences polled by CinemaScore gave the film an average grade of "B+" on an A+ to F scale.

=== Accolades ===
The film was nominated for several Saturn Awards, namely for Best Director, Best Fantasy Film, Best Music, and Best Special Effects. Glover and Picardo were both nominated for the Best Supporting Actor award.

== Merchandising ==
As with the first film, merchandising accompanied Gremlins 2: The New Batch. This may have been integral to the film's purpose. As one critic wrote, "it's a savvy, off-the-wall comedy that acknowledges, yes, it is just one more silly rip-off sequel, produced to sell off the merchandise inspired by the first film." One reference the film makes to the original, an allusion to the merchandising surrounding Gizmo, drew criticism. Some critics saw the mention of merchandise as tasteless. This type of product placement has since become more common.

The new merchandise released alongside the film included PVC figures, plush, and other collectibles by the now-defunct Applause company in 1990. Much later, action figures by the National Entertainment Collectibles Association (NECA Toys) based on characters such as the Brain and Mohawk gremlins were released. NECA also planned to release mogwais and gremlins from the film in late 2011 and 2012; with mogwai and gremlin versions of Daffy, Lenny and George, as well as a mogwai version of Mohawk. The Electric gremlin, flasher gremlin and the Phantom of the Opera gremlin were also planned to be released in action figure form by NECA. There were also newer versions of Gizmo released, including his Rambo look. Greta, a newer version of Mohawk and Mohawk in Spider form were also being planned.

There were also children's books like Gremlins 2: The New Batch: Movie Storybook, by Michael Teitelbaum, published by Goldencraft in December 1990. Little Golden Books published Gremlins 2: The New Batch: Gizmo to the Rescue in July 1990. In the United Kingdom, William Heinemann Ltd. had published two tie-in picture books from Buzz Books in August 1990 which contains photographs and scenes taken from the film. They were titled Don't Get Wet and Midnight Feast. David Bischoff wrote a novel based on the film published by Avon Books in June 1990. A unique aspect of the novel is how Bischoff adapts the sequence where the film breaks. In the novel, the Brain Gremlin subdues and locks Bischoff in his bathroom before taking the reins for a little bit to explain that the gremlins take over at this point in the film, his displeasure at Bischoff using the nickname "Mr. Glasses" instead of his official name and begins a treatise on politics before Bischoff breaks his way out of the bathroom with an axe and subdues the Brain Gremlin. The novel then continues where the film picked up after the film break.

The Spanish company Topo Soft developed a side-scrolling Gremlins 2: The New Batch video game for the Amiga, Atari ST, Commodore 64, MS-DOS, MSX, Amstrad CPC, and ZX Spectrum. It was distributed by Erbe Software in Spain and by Elite abroad, being the first time a Spanish video game company got an exclusive license from a Hollywood movie to make a videogame. Hi-Tech Expressions a different game for IBM PC compatibles in 1991, but it was poorly received. Sunsoft released versions for the Nintendo Entertainment System and Game Boy in 1990.

Elements from the film appear in the platform fighter MultiVersus, including a Brain Gremlin skin for Stripe and a Greta profile icon.

== Sequel ==
In January 2013, Vulture reported that Warner Bros. was negotiating with Steven Spielberg's Amblin Entertainment to reboot the Gremlins franchise. Seth Grahame-Smith and David Katzenberg are attached to produce However, Grahame-Smith has since stated that the project has been put on hold. In November 2015, Zach Galligan confirmed that the third film would be a sequel and not a reboot.

In a December 2016 interview with Bleeding Cool, Galligan said that Chris Columbus had been "aggressively working on a Gremlins 3", which had writer Carl Ellsworth on board. A 2017 interview with Columbus discussed his "twisted and dark" script which explored the idea that has been on the fans' minds for a long time: "If all the gremlins come from getting Gizmo wet and feeding his mogwai offspring after midnight, should Gizmo be eliminated?" In November 2020, Columbus stated that CGI would not be used for the gremlins and that traditional puppets and animatronics would continue to be used.

In April 2025, Warner Bros. Film Group CEO Pam Abdy confirmed that a new film in the franchise was officially in development, still with the involvement of Amblin and Columbus. In July 2025, Galligan revealed that the script was completed, Warner Bros. was eager to do it with Columbus as the new director and that they were just waiting for Spielberg to read and approve the script.

In November 2025, a sequel was announced with a release date of November 19, 2027 with Spielberg returning as executive producer and the script co-written by Columbus, Zach Lipovsky and Adam Stein. Columbus will also serve as the director. On September 23, 2026, the first teaser trailer featuring Gizmo was released and it was announced that the film was delayed to October 6, 2028. It was also announced that Hannah Marks was writing a new draft of the screenplay alongside Columbus.

== See also ==
- Gremlins 2: The New Batch (video game)
