= Michael Finnell =

American film producer

Michael Finnell is a film producer.

== Career ==
Finnell has produced several horror-comedy films, particularly with the director Joe Dante. Finnell worked for the American producer Roger Corman.

His first films were Avalanche (1978), Rock 'n' Roll High School (1979) and Airplane!, in which he was listed in the end credits as "generally in charge of a lot of things". Finnell then producedThe Howling in 1981 and Gremlins in 1984.

Finnell also produced Explorers (1985), The 'Burbs (1989), Gremlins 2: The New Batch (1990), Matinee (1993) and Small Soldiers (1998), Milk Money (1994) and Teaching Mrs. Tingle (1999). For one of his films produced without Dante, Newsies, Finnell was nominated for a Razzie Award for Worst Picture.

== Filmography ==
He was a producer in all films unless otherwise noted.

=== Film ===
Year	Film	Credit	Notes	Ref.
1978	Avalanche	Associate producer		
1979	Rock 'n' Roll High School			
1981	The Howling			
1983	Twilight Zone: The Movie	Associate producer	Uncredited	
1984	Gremlins			
1985	Explorers	Executive producer		
1987	Innerspace			
1989	The 'Burbs			
1990	Gremlins 2: The New Batch			
1991	Deceived			
1992	Newsies			
1993	Matinee			
1994	Milk Money	Executive producer		
1998	Small Soldiers			
1999	Teaching Mrs. Tingle	Co-executive producer		

Miscellaneous crew

Year	Film	Role
1976	Hollywood Boulevard	Production assistant
1976	Cannonball	Production assistant
1980	Airplane!	Generally in charge of a lot of things

As an actor

Year	Film	Role
1976	Cannonball	Helicopter Pilot
2003	21 Grams	Fat Prisoner

Production manager

Year	Film	Role
1977	Grand Theft Auto	Production manager: Second unit
1978	Starhops	Production manager

Thanks

Year	Film	Role
1982	Eating Raoul	The producers wish to thank
1982	Zapped!	Thanks
1983	Get Crazy	Special thanks
1987	The Puppetoon Movie	Special thanks

=== Television ===
Year	Title	Credit	Notes
1998	The Warlord: Battle for the Galaxy	Executive producer	Television film
2002−03	Jeremiah	Executive producer	

Miscellaneous crew

Year	Title	Role
2003−04	Jeremiah	Executive consultant
