= Belinda Balaski =

American actress (born 1947)

- Born: December 8, 1947 (age 78)
- Occupation: Actress
- Years active: 1974–present
- Father: Lester Balaski

Belinda Balaski (born December 8, 1947) is an American actress. Her film credits include Bobbie Jo and the Outlaw (1976) and The Howling (1981).

== Early life ==
Balaski's father, Lester Balaski, was a jockey, and she originally wanted to follow that career path. She attended Colorado Women's College and majored in drama at Parsons College.

== Career ==
Balaski is known for her role as Terri Fisher in Joe Dante's The Howling (1981), and has appeared in most of Dante's other films, including Piranha, Gremlins, Gremlins 2: The New Batch, Matinee and Small Soldiers, as well as two segments that Dante directed for Amazon Women on the Moon. She also co-starred in The Food of the Gods and Bobbie Jo and the Outlaw, both featuring Marjoe Gortner, and in Cannonball! as a navigator in a cross-country car race.

She won the Los Angeles Drama Critics Award for Best Supporting Actress for her portrayal of Emma Duckworth in a production of Bus Stop at Los Angeles Metropolitan Theatre. The role led to her working in television. Among many TV show appearances, she performed in two episodes of Baywatch: Sharks Cove (1992 Season 2) as a worried mother and Sail Away (1996 Season 6) as Cleo Jennings.

== Filmography ==
=== Film ===
Year	Title	Role	Notes
1974	Black Eye	Mary	
1976	Bobbie Jo and the Outlaw	Essie Beaumont	
1976	The Food of the Gods	Rita	
1976	Cannonball	Maryann	
1978	Till Death	Anne Ryan	
1978	Piranha	Betsy	
1979	Up Yours	Helen	
1981	The Howling	Terry Fisher	
1984	Gremlins	Mrs. Joe Harris	
1985	Explorers	Voice	
1987	Amazon Women on the Moon	Bernice Pitnik	Segments: Critics' Corner and Roast Your Loved One
1990	Gremlins 2: The New Batch	Movie Theatre Mom	
1993	Matinee	Stan's Mom	
1997	American Perfekt	Rita	
1998	Small Soldiers	Neighbor	
2001	The Vampire Hunters Club	Vampire Mother	Short
2018	Nightmare Cinema	Nadia	

=== Television ===
Year	Title	Role	Notes
1974	The F.B.I.	Sue	1 Episode, The Two Million Dollar Hit
1974	The Cowboys	Obie Graff	1 Episode, Requiem for a Lost Son
1974	Locusts	Janet Willimer	TV movie
1974	ABC Afterschool Special	Cindy Britton	1 Episode, Runaways
1975	ABC's Wide World of Entertainment	Beckie	1 Episode, The Werewolf of Woodstock
1975	Baretta	Nicole	1 Episode, Ragtime Billy Peaches
1975	S.W.A.T.	Judy Collins	1 Episode, A Coven of Killers
1975	Force Five	Ginger	TV movie
1975	Death Scream	Jenny Storm	TV movie
1977	Starsky and Hutch	M.E. Ginny Simpson	1 Episode, The Velvet Jungle
1977	The Fantastic Journey	Arla	1 Episode, An Act of Love
1977	Having Babies II	Ann	TV movie
1978	Charlie's Angels	Sue Kantrelle	1 Episode, Angels on the Run
1979	How the West Was Won	Missy	1 Episode, The Innocent
1979	Vega$	Lucille	1 Episode, The Visitor
1979	Mrs. R's Daughter	Lynn Hollister	TV movie
1983	The A-Team	Jimmy's Mother	1 Episode, Labor Pains
1984	Anatomy of an Illness		TV movie
1984	ABC Weekend Specials	Margaret Landry	1 Episode, Henry Hamilton Graduate Ghost
1985	Matt Houston	Lois	1 Episode, Death Watch
1985	Hunter	Judy	1 Episode, Fire Man
1986	Simon & Simon	Darlene Cooper	1 Episode, Family Forecast
1986	ABC Afterschool Specials	Anna	1 Episode, Are You My Mother?
1987	CBS Schoolbreak Special	Helen Green	1 Episode, My Dissident Mom
1987	Deadly Care	Terry	TV movie
1987	Proud Men	Nell	TV movie
1988	Our House	Mrs. Caulder	1 Episode, Artful Dodging
1988	Santa Barbara	Joan Stiller	1 Episode, Episode #1.956
1989	Falcon Crest	Dr. Stephanie Ambrose	3 episodes
1990	Father Dowling Mysteries	Scrub Nurse	1 Episode, The Medical Mystery
1991 - 1992	Eerie, Indiana	Mother / Winifred Swanson	2 episodes
1992	FBI: The Untold Stories		1 Episode, Operation Lemonade
1992	Reasonable Doubts	Phyllis Cleary	1 Episode, Mercury in Retrograde
1992 - 1996	Baywatch	Cleo Jennings / Worried Mother	2 episodes
1994	Runaway Daughters	Mrs. Nicholson	TV movie
1996	Seduced by Madness:The Diane Borchardt Story	Principal	TV mini-series
1997	The Second Civil War	Graphic Designer	TV movie
1998	The Warlord: Battle for the Galaxy	Barterer's Wife	TV movie, aka The Osiris Chronicles
