= Matinee (1993 film) =

1993 film by Joe Dante

- Theatrical release poster
- Directed by: Joe Dante
- Screenplay by: Charles S. Haas
- Story by: Jerico Stone; Charles S. Haas
- Produced by: Michael Finnell
- Starring: John Goodman; Cathy Moriarty; Simon Fenton; Omri Katz; Kellie Martin; Lisa Jakub
- Cinematography: John Hora
- Edited by: Marshall Harvey
- Music by: Jerry Goldsmith
- Production company: Renfield Productions
- Distributed by: Universal Pictures (United States and Canada); Pandora Cinema (International)
- Release date: January 29, 1993 (United States)
- Running time: 99 minutes
- Country: United States
- Language: English
- Budget: $14 million
- Box office: $9.5 million

Matinee is a 1993 American comedy film directed by Joe Dante, written by Jerico Stone and Charles S. Haas, and starring John Goodman, Cathy Moriarty, Simon Fenton, Omri Katz, Kellie Martin, and Lisa Jakub with supporting roles from Robert Picardo and Jesse White (in his final theatrical film role). Goodman plays a William Castle–type independent filmmaker promoting the premiere of his latest movie during the Cuban Missile Crisis. Despite critical acclaim and positive reviews, the film was a box office failure.

== Plot ==
In October 1962 in Key West, Florida, Gene Loomis and his younger brother Dennis live on a military base with their mother Anne while their father is away on a United States Navy ship. At a local movie theater one afternoon, Gene and Dennis see a promo for an exclusive engagement of producer Lawrence Woolsey's sensational new horror film entitled Mant! Woolsey is scheduled to appear in-person at the theater the following Saturday. After the boys return home to the base, the Loomis family watches President Kennedy deliver a speech confirming the presence of Soviet missiles in Cuba.

Arriving in Florida with his actress girlfriend Ruth Corday, Woolsey finds the fearful atmosphere created by the ongoing crisis perfect for hosting the premier of Mant! Two concerned citizens, Herb and Bob, protest the theatrical exhibition of Mant! However, local couple Jack and Rhonda advocate for allowing the premiere based on First Amendment rights. Later at home while reading an issue of Famous Monsters of Filmland, Gene recognizes Herb as having starred in an earlier Woolsey film, The Brain Leeches. Woosley admits he arranged the protests to drum up interest in the movie.

At school, Gene gradually befriends one of his classmates, Stan. He also becomes infatuated with Jack and Rhonda's daughter Sandra after she receives a week-long detention for protesting against the uselessness of a "duck and cover" air-raid drill, insisting that immediately dying from the effects of an atom bomb is preferable to dying from acute radiation syndrome caused by fallout. Stan has a crush on Sherry, another girl at school. However, Sherry's ex-boyfriend, violent juvenile delinquent Harvey Starkweather, threatens Stan, so he lies to her out of fear, calling off their first date.

Woolsey continues to devote himself to promoting Mant!, hiring Harvey to dress as the titular mutated half-man, half-ant creature from the film. He also installs large subwoofer-type speakers as the first phase of a new film gimmick he names "Rumble-Rama". The cinema's manager, Howard, warns about Rumble-Rama's potential effects on the old and fragile balcony area which has a maximum capacity of 100 people.

At the Saturday matinee, Sherry encounters Stan, who is attending the premiere screening with Gene and Dennis. Initially upset that he deceived her, she later reconciles with him when Gene intercedes on the couple's behalf. Sandra attends the premiere with her parents but leaves them to watch the film with Gene. When Harvey (costumed as the Mant! monster) sees Sherry and Stan kissing during the film, he attacks Stan in a rage, then punches Woolsey after he tries to intervene, and a chase ensues. Stan takes a shotgun from a fallout shelter located in the theater's basement and uses it to frighten off Harvey. Sandra and Gene are unintentionally locked inside the shelter when the door is accidentally closed and its time-lock activated. While trapped inside, the two comfort each other, eventually sharing their first kiss. Woolsey helps rescue the pair from the shelter before their oxygen supply runs out.

Harvey reappears and holds his switchblade to Ruth's throat, demanding the movie premiere's cash receipts from Woolsey. As he steals the cash, he kidnaps Sherry and escapes. Howard immediately calls the police and Harvey is quickly arrested after crashing Woolsey's 1959 Cadillac convertible outside the movie theater. Sherry and Stan happily reunite after this ordeal. Woolsey also realizes that Harvey has turned the "Rumble-Rama" machinery up so high that the now-overcrowded theater balcony is starting to collapse from the heavy sound vibrations. Assisted by Gene, Woolsey projects trompe-l'œil footage of an atomic bomb mushroom cloud that appears to blast a hole through the screen and the theater's outside wall, quickly evacuating the now panicked audience to safety.

After the Cuban Missile Crisis has ended, Ruth and Woolsey leave for another premiere in Cleveland, bidding goodbye to Sandra and Gene. Woolsey has grown fond of the two kids, telling Ruth he might like to have two children after they marry. Sandra and Gene watch them drive away in Woolsey's new 1961 Cadillac. Navy helicopters fly over the beaches in Key West, implying that Gene's father will soon return home.

== Cast ==
- John Goodman as Lawrence Woolsey, a Hollywood producer behind the movie Mant!
- Cathy Moriarty as Ruth Corday, an actress and girlfriend of Woolsey who portrays Carole in Mant!
- Simon Fenton as Gene Loomis, a teenager who lives on a military base
- Omri Katz as Stan, a classmate of Gene's whom Gene befriends
- Kellie Martin as Sherry, a girl whom Stan has a crush on
- Lisa Jakub as Sandra, a girl whom Gene befriends
- Robert Picardo as Howard, the theater manager
- Lucinda Jenney as Anne Loomis, Gene's mother
- Jesse Lee as Dennis Loomis, Gene's younger brother
- Jesse White as Mr. Spector
- James Villemaire as Harvey Starkweather, a juvenile delinquent and aspiring poet who is Sherry's ex-boyfriend
- David Clennon as Jack, Sandra's father, who advocates the release of Mant!
- Dick Miller as Herb Denning, a former hired thug turned actor who works for Woolsey
- John Sayles as Bob, a victim of the Hollywood blacklist now relegated to cheap, independent B movies, who works for Woolsey
- Lucy Butler as Rhonda, Sandra's mother, who advocates for the release of Mant!
- Georgie Cranford as Dwight, Sherry's younger brother
- Belinda Balaski as Stan's mother
- Charles S. Haas as Mr. Elroy, a teacher
- Mark McCracken as Bill, a man who is transformed into a human-ant monster in Mant!
- Archie Hahn as "Shook Up Shopping Cart" star
- Naomi Watts as "Shook Up Shopping Cart" starlet
- Brett Rice as the voice of Mr. Loomis, Gene's dad, who is in the military
- Kevin McCarthy (uncredited) as Gen. Ankrum in Mant!
- William Schallert (uncredited) as Leonard Grabow DDS, a doctor who appears in Mant!

== Production ==
Joe Dante says the financing of the film was difficult:

Matinee got made through a fluke. The company that was paying for us went out of business and didn't have any money. Universal, which was the distributor, had put in a little money, and we went to them and begged them to buy into the whole movie, and to their everlasting sorrow they went ahead and did it. [Laughs.]

Principal photography began on April 13, 1992. Filming took place in and around the state of Florida, including the towns of Cocoa, Maitland, and Key West. The interior sequences in the school and the movie theater were filmed on set at Universal Studios Florida in Orlando. The street scenes were filmed in Oxnard, California. Production was completed on June 19, 1992.

=== Music ===
The original film score was composed by Jerry Goldsmith. Several cues from previous genre films were also used, arranged and conducted by Dick Jacobs. These included "Main Title" from Son of Dracula (1943); "Visitors" from It Came from Outer Space (1953); "Main Title" from Tarantula (1955); "Winged Death" from The Deadly Mantis (1957); two cues from This Island Earth (1955), "Main Title" and "Shooting Stars"; and three cues from the Creature from the Black Lagoon trilogy: "Monster Attack" from Creature from the Black Lagoon (1954); "Main Title" from Revenge of the Creature (1955); and "Stalking the Creature" from The Creature Walks Among Us (1956).

=== Casting ===
Joe Dante had cast character actor Dick Miller in each of his movies, casting him in Matinee as one of the men protesting the monster movie's release, and as a soldier holding a sack of sugar in Mant! Also appearing in supporting roles are William Schallert and Robert O. Cornthwaite (who both appeared in scores of low-budget films of all genres), as well as Kevin McCarthy (perhaps best remembered for his role in Invasion of the Body Snatchers) and Robert Picardo, both of whom appeared in several of Dante's films. John Sayles, who collaborated with Dante on earlier films, appears as one of the men who is protesting the release of Mant.

=== Character names ===
Some of the characters have surnames that reference other actors from 1950s science fiction films. Dick Miller's character, Denning, shares his name with the actor Richard Denning (Creature from the Black Lagoon, The Black Scorpion). Cathy Moriarty's Ruth Corday is a reference to Mara Corday (The Giant Claw, Tarantula), and Kevin McCarthy's General Ankrum is a tribute to Morris Ankrum who played military leaders in The Giant Claw, Earth vs. The Flying Saucers, Invaders from Mars, and Beginning of the End. Joe Dante had done a similar thing in his 1980 werewolf film The Howling, where characters shared surnames with other directors who had made werewolf films.

=== Films within the film ===
==== Mant! ====
Woolsey's low-budget Mant! is a parody morphing of several low-budget science fiction horror films of the 1950s (many in black and white) that fused radioactivity with mad science and mutation. Similar films include Tarantula (1955), wherein a scientist is injected with an atomic isotope formula with disastrous results, and the films Them! (1954), The Beast with a Million Eyes (1955), The Deadly Mantis (1957), The Black Scorpion (1957), The Amazing Colossal Man (1957), Monster That Challenged the World (1957), Beginning of the End (1957), War of the Colossal Beast (1958), The Fly (1958), and The Alligator People (1959). The depiction of Mant!'s use of Rumble-Rama is a riff on William Castle's many in-theatre gimmicks ("Emergo", "Percepto", "Illusion-O", "Shock Sections", etc.); however, the only "monster movie" produced or directed by William Castle before 1970 was 1959's The Tingler, which did not have a radiation theme. Rumble-Rama is also a nod to Sensurround, Universal's sound process of the 1970s. Matinee also mentions some of Woolsey's earlier horror movies: Island of the Flesh Eaters, The Eyes of Doctor Diablo, and The Brain Leeches (not to be confused with the real-world 1977 film of the same name).

==== The Shook-Up Shopping Cart ====
Although Matinee is set in October 1962, its other film within a film, the family-oriented gimmick comedy The Shook-Up Shopping Cart (featuring an anthropomorphic shopping cart), is a reference to some color Disney comedies that came later in the decade: The Love Bug (1969) in particular, and The Ugly Dachshund (1966), Monkeys, Go Home! (1967), Blackbeard's Ghost (1968), The Horse in the Gray Flannel Suit (1968), The Million Dollar Duck (1971), Snowball Express (1972), and The Shaggy D.A. (1976) in general. The film features Naomi Watts as the niece of a man transformed into a shopping cart.

== Release ==
Matinee was released on January 29, 1993, in 1,143 theatres. It ranked at #6 at the box office, grossing $3,601,015 in its opening weekend. The film went on to gross $9,532,895 in its theatrical run.

== Reception ==
Matinee received critical acclaim and has a 93% approval rating at Rotten Tomatoes, based on 42 reviews with an average rating of 7.7/10. The website's critical consensus reads, "Smart, funny, and disarmingly sweet, Matinee is a film that film buffs will love – and might even convert some non-believers."

Roger Ebert gave the film three and half out of four stars and wrote, "There are a lot of big laughs in Matinee, and not many moments when I didn't have a wide smile on my face." Gene Siskel gave the film three and half out of four stars and remarked that the "boring title ... doesn't communicate the joy within this film". In her review for The New York Times, Janet Maslin wrote, "Matinee, which devotes a lot of energy to the minor artifacts of American pop culture circa 1962, is funny and ingenious up to a point. Eventually, it becomes much too cluttered, with an oversupply of minor characters and a labored bomb-and-horror-film parallel that necessitates bringing down the movie house." Entertainment Weekly gave the film a B+ rating, with Owen Gleiberman writing, "In Matinee, Dante has captured the reason that Cold War trash like Mant struck such a nerve in American youth: The prospect of atomic disaster was so fanciful and abstract that it began to merge in people's imaginations with the very pop culture it had spawned. In effect, it all became one big movie. Matinee is a loving tribute to the schlock that fear created."

In his review for the Los Angeles Times, Peter Rainer wrote of Dante's film: "He pulls out his bag of tricks and even puts in an animated doodle; he's reaching not only for the flagrant awfulness of movies like MANT but also for the zippy ardor of the classic Warner Bros. cartoons. He does everything but put a buzzer under your seat." In his review for the Chicago Reader, Jonathan Rosenbaum wrote, "At the same time that Dante has a field day brutally satirizing our desire to scare ourselves and others, he also re-creates early-60s clichés with a relish and a feeling for detail that come very close to love." In her review for The Washington Post, Rita Kempley wrote "In this funny, philosophical salute to B-movies and the B-moguls who made them, Dante looks back fondly on growing up with the apocalypse always on your mind and atomic mutants lurking under your bed." In his review for USA Today, Mike Clark wrote, "Part spoof, part nostalgia trip and part primer in exploitation-pic ballyhoo, Matinee is a sweetly resonant little movie-lovers' movie."

== See also ==
- List of films featuring fictional films
