= Cannonball (film) =

1976 film by Paul Bartel

- Theatrical release poster
- Directed by: Paul Bartel
- Written by: Paul Bartel; Donald C. Simpson
- Produced by: Samuel W. Gelfman
- Starring: David Carradine; Bill McKinney; Veronica Hamel; Belinda Balaski; Archie Hahn
- Cinematography: Tak Fujimoto
- Edited by: Mort Tubor
- Music by: David A. Axelrod
- Production companies: Cross-County Productions; Shaw Brothers Studio; Harbour Productions
- Distributed by: New World Pictures
- Release date: July 6, 1976 (United States)
- Running time: 93 minutes
- Countries: United States; Hong Kong
- Language: English
- Budget: $780,000
- Box office: $1.5 million (rentals)

Cannonball (stylized on-screen as Cannonball!, and released theatrically in the UK as Carquake) is a 1976 comedy film directed by Paul Bartel and starring David Carradine. The film is co-produced by the American studios Cross-County Productions and Harbour Productions and Hong Kong's Shaw Brothers Studio. It is one of two released in 1976 that were based on the Cannonball Baker Sea-to-Shining-Sea Memorial Trophy Dash, a real illegal cross-continent road race that took place for a number of years in the United States (the other being The Gumball Rally). The same topic later became the basis for the films The Cannonball Run, Cannonball Run II and Speed Zone. The film was written and directed by Paul Bartel, who also directed Death Race 2000.

The name of the film and the plot were inspired by Erwin G. "Cannonball" Baker (1882–1960), who traveled across the United States several times, and by the illegal cross-continent road race introduced by Brock Yates to protest the 55 MPH speed limit.

== Plot ==
The Trans-America Grand Prix is an illegal race held every year between Los Angeles (Santa Monica Pier) and New York City. Recently released from jail, where he was serving a sentence for killing a girl while driving drunk, racing driver Coy "Cannonball" Buckman hopes to win the race and get his career back on track. Racing team Modern Motors have promised a contract to either him or his arch-rival Cade Redman who is also in the race – the contract will go to whomever of them wins. Coy is still on probation and when his parole officer, Linda Maxwell, with whom he is having an elaborate affair, discovers he will be crossing state lines in violation of his parole, she attempts to stop him, only to have him force her to accompany him on the race. Redman also has company in the form of country singer Perman Waters and his manager Sharma Capri who have agreed to pay Redman's race expenses in return for his taking them with him to New York in his Dodge Charger.

Other competitors include teenage surfer sweethearts Jim Crandell and Maryann driving her father's Chevrolet Corvette; middle-aged corrupt cop Terry McMillan in a Chevrolet Blazer; three waitresses, Sandy Harris, Ginny, and Wendy in a souped-up van; arrogant German driver Wolfe Messer in a De Tomaso Pantera; preppy African-American Beutell Morris in a Lincoln Continental he has been hired by wealthy elderly couple the Schulenbergs to transport to New York for them (unaware that he is using it to enter the race); and Buckman's best friend Zippo in a Pontiac Trans Am identical to Coy's. Unknown to Coy, his brother Bennie has bet heavily on the race and plans to use underhand methods to ensure Coy wins.

As the race degenerates into a violent demolition derby, Messer is blown up by Bennie, while Terry attempts to cheat by having his Blazer flown from LAX to New York's LaGuardia Airport, where he waits out the race with his mistress Louisa. Beutell's borrowed Lincoln gets more and more damaged as the race goes on, while Jim and Maryann face engine trouble with a broken fan belt. The rivalry between Coy and the increasingly unstable Redman gets out of control as the two fight and attempt to force each other off the road, with Coy crashing his Trans Am after Redman breaks the headlights. Switching to a 1969 Ford Mustang he borrows from some local hot-rodders, Coy has a last showdown with Redman, who has kicked Perman and Sharma out of his car after arguing with them. A piece of Perman's guitar, which Redman smashed in a rage after getting sick of Perman's singing and on-the-road radio broadcasts, gets stuck behind the car pedals, causing Redman to lose control and suffer a fatal crash over the side of an unfinished bridge.

Meanwhile, Bennie has sent gunman Sharpe to kill the driver of the "other" red Trans Am as it is beating Coy. He is unaware that the driver is Zippo or that Linda is now riding with him, as Coy thought it safer for her to do so since Redman was after him. While with Zippo, Linda learns he was driving the car in which the girl was killed, not Coy, who took the blame because he knew the weaker Zippo would never survive in jail.

Sharpe shoots Zippo dead and the Trans Am crashes and explodes. Linda jumps clear, but is badly injured. Jim and Maryann see the wreck and pick up the comatose Linda, taking her to the hospital. Behind them, the presence of the wrecked Trans Am on the freeway causes a multiple-car pileup.

Terry and Louisa arrive first at the finish line, but she lets slip that the Blazer was flown there and he is disqualified. The girls in the van and Coy are neck-and-neck as they cross into New York City, with Coy driving over the George Washington Bridge and the girls taking the Lincoln Tunnel until Sandy attempts to take a shortcut when the girls get lost and are stuck in traffic and the van crashes. Coy arrives at the finish line and is about to stamp his timecard, making him the official winner, when he is told about Zippo and Linda's accident and realizes Bennie caused it. He tears up his timecard so it can't be stamped and gives the pieces to Bennie, who is taken away by gangster Lester Marks to whom he owes all the money he bet on Coy, presumably to be killed. Assured of his racing contract, Coy is taken to the hospital by team manager Kid Hooper to be reunited with Linda. Having decided to finish the race despite believing they cannot win having lost so much time, Jim and Maryann are the next to arrive at the finish line. They are surprised and overjoyed to be told they are the winners of the $100,000 grand prize.

At the hospital, Coy and Linda enjoy their reunion, while Beutell delivers the Lincoln – now completely wrecked – to the horrified Schulenbergs in front of a hotel in the city.

== Cast ==
- David Carradine as Coy "Cannonball" Buckman
- Bill McKinney as Cade Redman
- Veronica Hamel as Linda Maxwell
- Gerrit Graham as Perman Waters
- Robert Carradine as Jim Crandell
- Belinda Balaski as Maryann
- Mary Woronov as Sandy Harris
- Diane Lee Hart as Wendy
- Glynn Rubin as Ginny
- James Keach as Wolf Messer
- Dick Miller as Bennie Buckman
- Paul Bartel as Lester Marks
- Stanley Bennett Clay as Beutell Morris
- Judy Canova as Sharma Capri
- Archie Hahn as Zippo
- Carl Gottlieb as Terry McMillan
- David Arkin as Dennis Caldwell
- John Herzfeld as Sharpe
- Louisa Moritz as Louisa
- Patrick Wright as Brad Phillips
- Joe Dante as Kid Hooper
- Allan Arkush as Panama
- Jonathan Kaplan as Gas Station Attendant
- Roger Corman as District Attorney
- Don Simpson as District Attorney
- Aron Kincaid as David
- Saul Krugman as Mr. Schulenberg
- Mary-Robin Redd as Mrs. Schulenberg
- Martin Scorsese as Mafioso #1
- Sylvester Stallone as Mafioso #2 (uncredited)

== Production ==
Producer Sam Gelfman wanted to make a film about the Cannonball Baker Sea-to-Shining-Sea Memorial Trophy Dash race. After the success of Death Race 2000, he hired Paul Bartel to direct and David Carradine to star, and set up the film at Fox. However Fox decided not to make it. Gelfman had Don Simpson rewrite the script then obtained finance from a group of investors including New World, Run Run Shaw and Gustave Berne.

Roger Corman told Bartel that Death Race 2000 would have been more successful had it been more realistic and so Bartel made Cannonball as the answer.

Bartel later said he worked for a year on Death Race 2000 for $5,000 "so when it was finished I desperately needed money. The only thing anybody wanted from me was another car picture, hence Cannonball. Corman had drummed into me the idea that if Death Race had been 'harder' and 'more real' it would have been more popular. Like a fool, I believed him". Bartel says: "I am not, and never have been, very much interested in cars and racing" so he decided to load up the film "cameos and character gimmicks that did interest me". His favorite scene was the one where Bartel, playing nightclub owner Lester Marks, plays the piano and sings while two gangsters beat up Bennie Buckman (Dick Miller).

The cameo by Sylvester Stallone is uncredited, while Roger Corman and Simpson appear as district attorneys. Directors Joe Dante, Jonathan Kaplan, Allan Arkush and Martin Scorsese have cameos, and former beach movie star and The Transformers voice actor Aron Kincaid appears in a small role as one of two cops who pull over the girls in the van.

== Reception ==
The film was chosen to open the Edinburgh Film Festival. However it was less successful than Death Race 2000.

Roger Ebert gave the film 1 star but criticized the humor and the logic of the film. Time Out similarly critiqued Bartel's "disregard for narrative in favour of a series of jokes."

== See also ==
- The Gumball Rally (1976)
- The Cannonball Run (1981)
