= Innerspace =

1987 science fiction comedy film directed by Joe Dante

- Theatrical release poster by John Alvin
- Directed by: Joe Dante
- Screenplay by: Jeffrey Boam; Chip Proser
- Story by: Chip Proser
- Produced by: Michael Finnell
- Starring: Dennis Quaid; Martin Short; Meg Ryan; Kevin McCarthy
- Cinematography: Andrew Laszlo
- Edited by: Kent Beyda
- Music by: Jerry Goldsmith
- Production company: Amblin Entertainment
- Distributed by: Warner Bros.
- Release date: July 1, 1987
- Running time: 120 minutes
- Country: United States
- Language: English
- Budget: $27 million
- Box office: $95 million (estimated)

Innerspace, stylized as InnerSPACE, is a 1987 American science fiction comedy film directed by Joe Dante and produced by Michael Finnell, inspired by the 1966 film Fantastic Voyage. The film stars Dennis Quaid, Martin Short, Meg Ryan, Robert Picardo, and Kevin McCarthy. The plot centers on adventurous test pilot Tuck Pendleton, who volunteers for a secret miniaturization experiment but is accidentally injected into the body of timid hypochondriac Jack Putter, forcing the duo to collaborate in helping Tuck escape and stop a criminal plot to steal the technology.

Innerspace was released by Warner Bros. in the United States on July 1, 1987. The film received positive reviews from critics, grossed an estimated $95 million worldwide, and won an Academy Award for Best Visual Effects, the only film directed by Dante to do so.

== Plot ==
In San Francisco, aviator Lt. Tuck Pendleton resigns his commission and volunteers for a secret miniaturization experiment. He is placed in a submersible pod and both are shrunk to microscopic size. They are transferred into a syringe to be injected into a rabbit, but the lab is attacked by a rival organization that plans to seize the experiment and steal the miniaturization technology.

Experiment supervisor Ozzie Wexler escapes with the syringe, and a chase ensues. At a nearby shopping mall, one of the rivals' henchmen, Mr. Igoe, shoots Ozzie. To stop the experiment from falling into the rivals' hands, the wounded Ozzie injects Tuck and the pod into an unsuspecting passerby—Safeway grocery clerk Jack Putter.

Unaware of what has happened, Tuck believes that he has been injected into the rabbit. After attempts to radio the lab are unsuccessful, he navigates to the optic nerve and implants a camera to see what the "host" sees. Realizing that he is inside a human, he makes contact by attaching another device to Jack's inner ear, enabling him to talk to Jack. Before the pod runs out of oxygen, Jack must help extract Tuck by going back to the lab.

At the lab, the scientists explain to Tuck and Jack that the other group stole one of two computer chips that are vital to the process. The second chip is inside Tuck's pod. Their mastermind is Victor Scrimshaw.

Jack contacts Tuck's estranged girlfriend, Lydia Maxwell, a reporter who has had dealings with "the Cowboy," one of Scrimshaw's henchmen. They learn that he plans to buy the computer chip from Scrimshaw and stake out his hotel. After following him to a nightclub, Lydia seduces him. Jack follows Lydia and the Cowboy back to the hotel and knocks the latter unconscious. Tuck then uses the pod's equipment to control Jack's facial muscles, altering his features so he looks like the Cowboy. Lydia and Jack, posing as the Cowboy, meet with Scrimshaw to steal the chip from him. However, as they are about to take possession of it, Jack's nervousness overrides his transformation, exposing the scam. Igoe captures Lydia and him, and takes them to their laboratory. While imprisoned, Jack and Lydia kiss, which, unknown to them, transfers Tuck into Lydia's body through their saliva. Once taken to the laboratory, the criminals shrink Igoe and inject him into Jack to locate Tuck, kill him, and obtain the other chip that is attached to the pod.

Jack and Lydia soon free themselves and order everyone in the laboratory, including Scrimshaw and scientist Dr. Margaret Canker, into the miniaturization device at gunpoint. Not knowing how to operate it, though, they accidentally and unknowingly shrink everyone to half their original size while trying to retrieve the chip. While trying to re-establish contact with Jack, Tuck discovers a growing fetus and realizes that he's inside Lydia's body, and that she is pregnant with his child. By going to her eardrum and playing their song, (Note: Sam Cooke's "Cupid".) he manages to alert them of what has happened. Jack and Lydia kiss again to transfer him back. They drive back to the lab to enlarge him, not realizing that the shrunken Scrimshaw and Canker have escaped and are hiding in the back seat. While they attempt to subdue Jack and Lydia, Igoe locates Tuck in Jack's esophagus and attacks him, severely crippling the pod. Tuck disables Igoe's craft, but he ejects and uses a drill to puncture one of Tuck's air tanks and the windshield. Tuck is able to kill Igoe by dropping the pod into Jack's stomach acid and dissolving him after agitating Jack's anxiety to increase the acidity.

At the lab, with only minutes of supplemental oxygen left in the pod, Jack follows Tuck's instructions to eject it from his lungs by making himself sneeze due to his hairspray allergy. Tuck and the pod are enlarged, and he is reunited with Lydia and finally gets to meet Jack in person. At Tuck and Lydia's wedding, held at Wayfarers Chapel, Jack is Tuck's best man. Tuck wears the chips as cufflinks. When they climb into the limousine, the Cowboy is shown to be the driver, and the shrunken Scrimshaw and Canker are hiding inside a suitcase in the trunk. Jack informs his manager that he quits and jumps into Tuck's car, (Note: A vintage 1967 Mustang.) pursuing the limousine to rescue the newlyweds.

== Cast ==
- Dennis Quaid as Lieutenant Tuck Pendleton
- Martin Short as Jack Putter
- Meg Ryan as Lydia Maxwell
- Kevin McCarthy as Victor Scrimshaw
- Fiona Lewis as Dr. Margaret Canker
- Henry Gibson as Mr. Wormwood
- John Hora as Dr. Ozzie Wexler
- Robert Picardo as The Cowboy
- Wendy Schaal as Wendy
- William Schallert as Dr. Greenbush
- Harold Sylvester as Pete Blanchard
- Mark L. Taylor as Dr. Niles
- Vernon Wells as Mr. Igoe
- Orson Bean as Lydia's Editor
- Kathleen Freeman as Dream Lady
- Archie Hahn as Messenger
- Kevin Hooks as Duane
- Dick Miller as Cab Driver
- Neil Ross as Pod Computer (voice)

In addition, the film's director, Joe Dante, has an uncredited cameo as a Vectorscope employee, while Short's SCTV cast mates Joe Flaherty and Andrea Martin have cameos as waiting-room patients. Chuck Jones and Rance Howard appear briefly as grocery shoppers in one scene.

== Production ==
The film began as an original script by Chip Proser, who called it "basically a rip off of Fantastic Voyage. My idea was that the big guy was up and moving around and could react to what was going on inside." The script was optioned by Peter Guber at Warner Bros. in 1984. Guber offered the script to Joe Dante, who turned it down. Guber then had the script rewritten by Jeffrey Boam as a comedy. Boam says, "The idea was kind of ridiculous, which was a person miniaturized and put into someone else's body. That's all I kept from the original script. They originally thought it might be Michael J. Fox inside Arnold Schwarzenegger's body. I actually kept turning it down, and they were persistent and kept coming back to me."

According to Dante, Boam "approached it ... from the concept of what would happen if we shrank Dean Martin down and injected him inside Jerry Lewis." Dante says that Steven Spielberg had become involved on the project as an executive producer and he may have been responsible for the comedy. "It was such a goofy idea that there were no limits to it," said Boam. "I felt I could do anything, and so the script I wrote was very loony and far out there but everybody loved it. Dick Donner, Joe Dante, John Carpenter and even Steven Spielberg wanted to do it. So when Steven wanted to do it, Warners thought I was a God and any amount of money it would take to do the movie they would spend. Steve ultimately decided he only wanted to produce so Joe came along and really latched on to the idea."

Quaid's role was originally envisioned to be played by an older actor, but then they decided to make the character younger. Dante recalled during filming scenes where Quaid and Short's characters interacted, "Dennis would be on the set in a booth, so the interaction was really happening. Dennis would hew to the script a little more than Marty. After you got a scene in the can, he'd beg for more takes, in the voice of Katharine Hepburn, which was hard to resist."

Dante says Spielberg would "protect you from the studio and sometimes from the other producers. It was a very filmmaker-friendly atmosphere over there [at Amblin]. You got all the best equipment and all the best people and all the toys you wanted to play with. Plus, you had somebody on your side who was also a filmmaker and they knew exactly what you were talking about when you had a problem or you had a question."

"It's a dumb, stupid comedy, which is exactly what people need in the summertime," said Quaid. "It's very idiotic and I love it. We encounter every dumb, stupid cliché in the book. Leave your brain at home and you'll have a good time."

Meg Ryan met Quaid on set and they later married.

== Awards ==
- 1988 Academy Award for Best Visual Effects, Won (Bill George, Dennis Muren, Harley Jessup and Kenneth F. Smith)
- 1988 Academy of Science Fiction, Fantasy & Horror Films: Best Director, Best Science Fiction Film, Best Special Effects, nominated

== Reception ==
=== Box office ===
The film grossed $25.9 million in the United States and Canada, generating $14 million in theatrical rentals. Internationally, it grossed $32.7 million in its first 37 days and was expected to gross $75 million ($30 million in rentals). It eventually returned $28 million in rentals, for a worldwide total rentals of $42 million and a worldwide gross in the region of $95 million against a budget of $27 million.

=== Critical response ===
The film had a positive reception from critics. On the review aggregator website Rotten Tomatoes, 81% of 48 critics' reviews are positive, with an average rating of 6.8/10. The website's consensus reads: "A manic, overstuffed blend of sci-fi, comedy, and romance, Innerspace nonetheless charms, thanks to Martin Short's fine performance and the insistent zaniness of the plot." Metacritic, which uses a weighted average, assigned the film a score of 66 out of 100, based on 15 critics, indicating "generally favorable" reviews. Roger Ebert of the Chicago Sun-Times gave the film 3 stars out of 4, stating "Here is an absurd, unwieldy, overplotted movie that nevertheless is entertaining - and some of the fun comes from the way the plot keeps laying it on".

Joe Dante later said the film "was a hit on video. It was one of the first big videos, and it was discovered on video, basically. Although audiences liked it in theaters—when I went, they were in stitches—the ad campaign was so terrible for that movie. It was just a giant thumb with a little tiny pod on it. You couldn't tell that it was a comedy—you couldn't tell anything—and it had a terrible title, because we could never figure out a better one. And the studio botched the selling of it. I mean, they liked the movie, and they tried to reissue it, even, with a different campaign, and it still bombed." "It's been looked back on as if it was some great success whereas, in fact, it was pretty much a disappointment in its day," he said. Dante later called the film "probably the movie that I had made up to then that was the closest to my intention. As a result, I was very happy with it. When I look at it today I still think it's a tremendous amount of fun."

Screenplay writer Chip Proser later said, "I never actually have been able to sit through it all at once. They don't pay me to watch this crap ... I wear a mask to cash the check."

== See also ==
- List of films featuring miniature people
