= Joe Dante =

American filmmaker (born 1946)

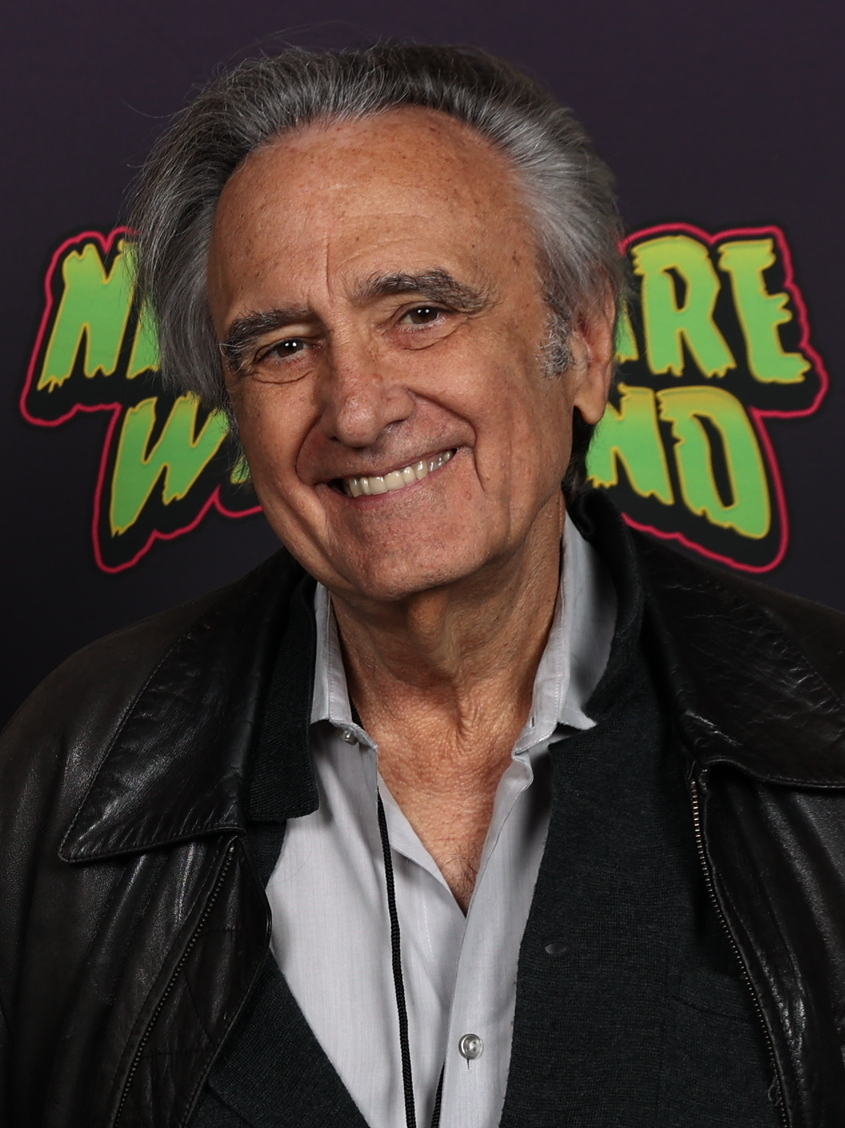
- Dante in 2023
- Born: November 28, 1946 (age 79); Morristown, New Jersey, U.S.
- Education: University of the Arts; Thomas Jefferson University
- Occupations: Director; producer; editor; actor
- Years active: 1968–present
- Spouse: Elizabeth Stanley
- Website: renfieldproductions.com

Joe Dante (/ˈdɑːnteɪ/; born November 28, 1946) is an American film director, producer, editor and actor. His films, notably Gremlins (1984) alongside its sequel, Gremlins 2: The New Batch (1990), often mix the 1950s-style B movie genre with 1960s radicalism and cartoon comedy.

Dante's output includes the films Piranha (1978), The Howling (1981), Explorers (1985), Innerspace (1987), The 'Burbs (1989), Matinee (1993), Small Soldiers (1998), and Looney Tunes: Back in Action (2003). His work for television and cable include the social satire The Second Civil War (1997), episodes of the anthology series Masters of Horror ("Homecoming" and "The Screwfly Solution") and Amazing Stories, as well as Police Squad! and Hawaii Five-0.

== Early life ==
Dante was born in Morristown, New Jersey, and grew up in nearby Livingston. His father was an Italian-American professional golfer who encouraged him to play sports; however, Dante was more interested in drawing cartoons and frequenting Saturday matinees at the cinema. Dante was 12 when Famous Monsters of Filmland, a magazine dedicated to horror films, came onto news shelves. He soon wrote to the magazine with reviews of certain horror films, which he did for a number of years.

Dante had originally planned on becoming a cartoonist, but was told that it wasn't a real art form and that he should try something else. While attending the Philadelphia College of Art, Dante realized he was more inclined toward filmmaking:

"I was told that cartooning isn't an art form and if I was smart I would take something else. So I took film. This was back in the days when everything was black and white, 16mm, silent – we were essentially making underground art films, so I can't say my filmmaking acumen derived from my teachings at the Philadelphia College of Art. Almost all of it came from the school of Roger Corman"

In his free time as a student, Dante began assembling The Movie Orgy, an epic collection of B movie clips, 16mm films, cartoons, commercials, and trailers that was seamlessly edited together into one 7-hour compilation.

== Career ==
=== 1970s ===
I didn't really learn much about making films, but I did spend as much time as I could at the local grindhouses where I caught up with old movies from the '30s on, most of which I could never have seen elsewhere. When it came time to try actual movie directing, I found I had a wellspring of images and ideas in my head to draw on.

— Joe Dante

After a stint as a film reviewer, Dante began his filmmaking apprenticeship in 1974 when producer Roger Corman offered him a job in the trailer-cutting department at New World Pictures, where he edited the trailers for such films as Cover Girl Models and Amarcord. Other established directors such as Francis Ford Coppola, Martin Scorsese and Peter Bogdanovich had already emerged from Corman's de-facto film school.

In 1975, Dante moved up to directing when he collaborated with fellow Corman school alumni Allan Arkush to make the satirical exploitation film Hollywood Boulevard. The film was conceived when Corman made a bet that he could produce a movie within ten days on a budget of only $54,000 (equivalent to $323,098 in 2025). Although producer Jon Davison reported the budget was approximately $50,000, it was the cheapest made by New World Pictures. The filmmakers achieved this by coming up with a story about a B movie studio which could incorporate footage from other movies that Corman owned.

Two years later, Dante directed Piranha, written by John Sayles. The film was shot in Texas "in a rush" on a budget of $600,000, and was considered quite ambitious for the time and cost. Dante, who was convinced the film would be a disaster, spent a month in the editing room. People came to visit him, but as Dante recalled he was in "such a fog" that he didn't even recognize who they were at first. The film won the attention of Steven Spielberg who, unbeknownst to Dante, prevented Universal from blocking the film's release, convincing them that Piranha was a parody and that it wasn't in competition with Jaws 2.

In 1979, Dante directed some scenes of Rock 'n' Roll High School when Allan Arkush fell ill due to exhaustion, but remains uncredited. Dante also helped plot the premise of the film with Arkush.

=== 1980s ===
Dante again collaborated with John Sayles when he enlisted him to rewrite the previously adapted draft of Gary Brandner's werewolf tale The Howling. Sayles rewrote the script with the same self-aware, satirical tone that he gave Piranha, and his finished script bears only a slight resemblance to Brandner's novel. Dante said that at the time he made The Howling, werewolves were considered by many to be "corny and old hat". His approach was to disguise it as long as possible and make it look like a slasher film — which was a lot more popular at the time — "and then bring in the supernatural elements slowly so that the audience could get acclimated and not immediately reject it as something old-fashioned." The film's special effects, which at the time were considered state-of-the-art, were completed by Rob Bottin after Rick Baker left to work on An American Werewolf in London.

Dante had been previously offered the chance to direct Airplane! by Zucker, Abrahams and Zucker. Although he turned it down, Dante agreed to direct two episodes of their police procedural spoof Police Squad!, which was his first experience shooting something on a studio lot.

It's the movie I'm going to be remembered for. If I get hit by a bus tomorrow, the headline is going to be "Gremlins Director Hit By Bus". I'll never do something that'll outlast that in terms of the public image of who I am – which is fine with me. It's not my favorite movie that I've ever made, but I'm perfectly happy with it and I think it does what it was supposed to do. It's strange that it's outlasted so many other pictures that were much more prestigious at the time. It expresses my personality too, which is the one thing that's the most difficult to get across in an expensive film.

— Joe Dante

Due to their work on The Howling, Dante and producer Michael Finnell received the opportunity to make the film Gremlins by Steven Spielberg. Spielberg also brought Dante on as one of the directors on John Landis' Twilight Zone: The Movie. Dante's segment, a remake of the original Twilight Zone episode "It's a Good Life", features cartoon-style special effects, revolving around a woman played by Kathleen Quinlan who is 'adopted' by an omnipotent boy. Dante also took over editing duties on George Miller's segment of the film, after he left the project feeling repulsed by the news of the fatal helicopter accident. Chris Columbus' original draft of Gremlins went through several rewrites before a shooting script was finalized. According to Dante, it was a gruelling shoot ("The whole thing was so exhausting") and once the design of the gremlins were finalized, the studio's reaction was divisive. The film follows a teenager, played by Zach Galligan, who inadvertently breaks three important rules concerning his new pet and unleashes a horde of malevolently mischievous monsters on a small town. It proved to be one of Dante's biggest hits to date, being the third highest-grossing film of 1984. "I'd never seen a reaction like that," Dante said of the film's first preview. "They thought it was the greatest thing ever and Warner Brothers was I think shocked, frankly, by how popular the picture became."

After the success of Gremlins, Dante took on the offer to direct Explorers, about a group of friends who build a working spacecraft and encounter extraterrestrial life. Dante liked the script, but felt the film needed a better third act. After being denied extra time by Paramount executives, Dante and the film's writer, Eric Luke, then improvised the story whilst filming commenced. In the spring of 1985, Paramount changed the film's initial release date from late August to early July, telling Dante and the editors to stop editing and deliver a shorter rough cut. As a result, about an hour and a half worth of footage was left on the editing room floor. Explorers marked the film debuts of both Ethan Hawke and River Phoenix, and has only grown in its reputation over time, developing a cult following. Dante reflected on the film by saying that he is appreciative of the warm reception it has earned over the years, but continued by saying "the problem is for me is that the movie you'll see is not the movie I wanted to make. It's the movie I got to make up to a certain point and then had to stop. It's hard for me to look at it, cause it's not the film I quite had in mind." The missing and cut scenes are presumably lost, as Dante tried searching for them in recent years.

In the mid-1980s, Dante was offered the script of Innerspace written by Chip Proser, who called it "a rip off of Fantastic Voyage". Dante initially turned the film down until the script was later rewritten as a comedy by Jeffrey Boam. Dante said he had a "wonderful experience" making Innerspace, mainly because of the cast which included actors Dennis Quaid, Martin Short, and Meg Ryan among others. However, after one particular day of filming, Dante recalled that studio executives from Warner Brothers had invited him out to lunch and told him that what he was doing was not funny and described Short as being "not very attractive", wanting to recast the role. While this conversation left him with a lot of anxiety, Dante decided to "plow on" and just make the movie he always intended to make. Despite successful test screenings, the film ended up flopping at the box office in the summer of 1987. Dante said this was because the studio did not know how to promote it and that the original poster failed to include the movie's actors on it.

In 1988, Dante agreed to direct the black comedy The 'Burbs, intrigued by its premise and the blending of real-life situations with elements of the supernatural. Dante and producers Larry Brezner and Michael Finnell agreed that Tom Hanks would be the most suitable actor to portray the married Ray Peterson, a suburban homeowner who tries to introduce excitement into his life by investigating the activities of his mysterious neighbors. Dante referred to Hanks as "the reigning everyman, a guy that everybody can identify with", comparing him to James Stewart. Production on The 'Burbs was filmed in chronological order (due to the 1988 writer's strike) over the course of ten weeks, mainly on the Colonial Street backlot at Universal Studios. "There was a lot of temptation to broaden it and go outside the neighborhood, but it seemed to violate the spirit of the piece," Dante said, "It's almost the kind of thing that could be a stage play except that you could never do on-stage what we've done in this movie."

=== 1990s ===
Dante was asked many times to helm a sequel to Gremlins, due to its financial success. Dante declined, because he saw that story as having a proper ending, and thus a sequel would only be meant to be profitable. The studio decided to proceed without him, approaching various directors and writers. Storylines considered included sending the gremlins to Las Vegas or even into outer space. After those ideas fell through, the studio returned to Dante, who agreed to make the sequel after receiving the rare promise of having complete creative control over the movie as well as a budget tripling that of the original film. Since Chris Columbus was not available to write the sequel's script at the time, Dante brought on screenwriter Charles S. Haas to help plot the film. Dante later claimed it was the film into which he had put the most of his personal influence. He referred to it as "one of the more unconventional studio pictures ever," imagining it as a satire of Gremlins and sequels in general, resulting in a film with several meta-references and self-referential humor. Both Zach Galligan and Phoebe Cates returned to star in the film. It also features several guest stars, including Christopher Lee as a mad scientist. The film was released to theaters in the Summer of 1990 but did not perform as well at the box office as the original.

Charles S. Haas wrote two more films for Dante; one an unproduced script about Chuck Jones' early years at Termite Terrace and the other, Matinee about the Cuban Missile Crisis. In it, John Goodman stars as William Castle-type filmmaker Lawrence Woolsey, who specializes in horror and sci-fi B movies. Originally written by Jerico Stone, Dante said his draft was "quite different than the film that eventually emerged." The film opened in early 1993 and received positive reviews, but failed to turn a profit.

From 1993 to 1994, Dante was attached as the director of The Phantom, developing a draft of the script together with Jeffrey Boam, which was originally tongue-in-cheek in tone. According to Dante, right when the film was to begin shooting, Paramount pulled the plug on the film over its budget. Later, it was put back into production, with the script rewritten under a new director who made it serious, despite the script's humorous tone. Dante ended up with an executive producer credit.

In 1994, Dante directed the television film Runaway Daughters (a loose remake of the 1956 film), that aired as part of the anthology series Rebel Highway which paid homage to 1950s "drive-in classic" B movies by revamping them "with a '90s edge". Dante also directed the 1997 made-for-television film The Second Civil War, a social satire about anti-immigration. The film was allegedly troubled with a "tremendous amount of interference during post-production" by a studio executive at HBO. In 1998, he directed the made-for-television film The Warlord: Battle for the Galaxy, the intended pilot for an undeveloped sci-fi TV series, The Osiris Chronicles.

When Dante began pre-production work for Small Soldiers, a film about toy action figures who come to life, he was told to make an "edgy picture for teenagers." Later, after Burger King became a sponsor to promote the film, he was told to soften it as a "kiddie movie" and as a result, several of the action and explosion scenes were edited out. Dante also claimed there were 12 uncredited writers who did work on the film over the course of five years. When released in 1998, it received mixed reviews and was a moderate box office success.

=== 2000s ===
Dante directed the 2003 live-action/animation hybrid Looney Tunes: Back in Action. The project was developed several other times before eventually being offered to Dante. He agreed to direct the film to pay tribute to his idol Chuck Jones, and as somewhat of a placeholder for his unmade biographical comedy Termite Terrace. He and screenwriter Larry Doyle reportedly wanted the film to be the "anti-Space Jam" as Dante disliked how that film represented the Looney Tunes brand and personalities. While feeling that he and the film's animation director Eric Goldberg had managed to preserve the original personalities of the characters, the film's opening, middle and ending are different from what Dante initially envisioned. Dante stated that he had no creative freedom on the project, calling the experience "the longest year and a half of my life." According to Dante, the studio executives grew tired of the film's jokes and wanted them to be changed. 25 gag writers were then brought in to try to write jokes that were short enough for the voice actors to dub into an animated character's mouth. Despite this, Doyle remained the film's only credited writer.

Following his experience working on Looney Tunes: Back in Action, Dante took a brief hiatus from movies, instead returning to television, directing two episodes of the horror anthology series Masters of Horror.

In 2007, Dante launched the web series Trailers from Hell, which provides commentary by directors, producers and screenwriters on trailers for classic and cult movies. Dante also actively contributes to the website.

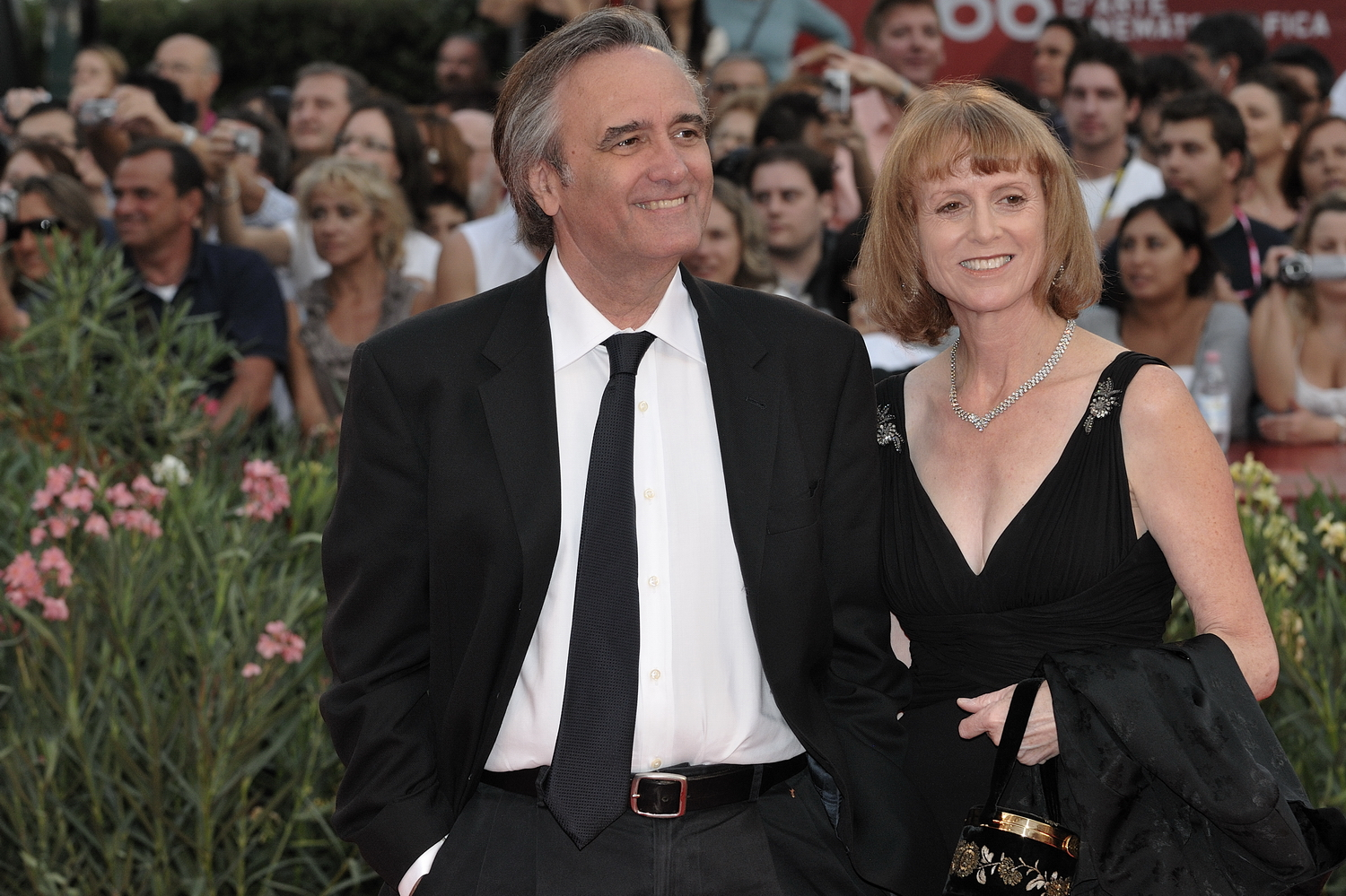
Dante and Elizabeth Stanley attending the 66th Venice International Film Festival in 2009

Dante returned to feature films several years later in 2009 with the independent 3D horror comedy The Hole, which received the Premio Persol award at the Venice Film Festival. Dante cited Dial M for Murder, Kill, Baby, Kill, The Cabinet of Dr. Caligari and Killer Klowns from Outer Space as influences on the film.

With Roger Corman producing, Dante directed the interactive web series Splatter for Netflix. The series stars Corey Feldman as a rock star seeking revenge on those he thinks have wronged him.

=== 2010s ===
From 2011 to 2017, Dante directed ten episodes of Hawaii Five-0 reboot, which he joked was "to get the rent paid." Also during this decade, various projects Dante was officially involved with struggled with funding. Among them were the anthology film Paris, I'll Kill You, the werewolf feature Monster Love, and the Roger Corman biopic The Man with Kaleidoscope Eyes.

Subsequently, Dante directed Anton Yelchin and Ashley Greene in Burying the Ex, adapted from Alan Trezza's 2008 short film. Principal photography ran through November–December 2013. The film follows a horror film buff whose controlling girlfriend suddenly dies in a freak accident but when he tries to move on with his life along with his new partner, he discovers that his ex has come back from the dead in the form of a zombie. It was selected to be screened out of competition at the 71st Venice International Film Festival, and was released theatrically in 2015.

Dante served as executive producer on the independent feature length thriller Dark, starring Whitney Able and Alexandra Breckenridge, directed by Nick Basile. The film, set in New York City during the 2003 blackout, was released by Screen Media Films on June 7, 2016.

For years, Dante has tried to make a film about his mentor Corman and the making of his 1967 film The Trip, but has struggled to gather funding for it. Titled The Man with Kaleidoscope Eyes, the film went through several permutations over the years, including one starring Colin Firth as Corman. The film spent several years stuck in the development stage at SpectreVision. In October 2016, Dante directed a live table-reading of the film's script at the Vista Theatre in Los Angeles, which starred Bill Hader as Corman, Jason Ritter as Peter Fonda and Ethan Embry as Jack Nicholson. Subsequently, a 2017 shoot was planned. A cameo role featuring Corman was reportedly shot in case he died before production began. Despite this, plans for a film were effectively shelved following the passing of Corman. In 2022, the film's script was adapted and published in the form of a graphic novel.

Dante directed a segment of the 2018 horror anthology film Nightmare Cinema starring Mickey Rourke, which also featured shorts directed by Alejandro Brugués, Mick Garris, Ryūhei Kitamura, and David Slade. The same month of its release, Dante launched his own weekly podcast The Movies That Made Me, with screenwriter Josh Olson as his co-host, where filmmakers and entertainers are brought on to discuss the movies that inspired them.

=== 2020s ===
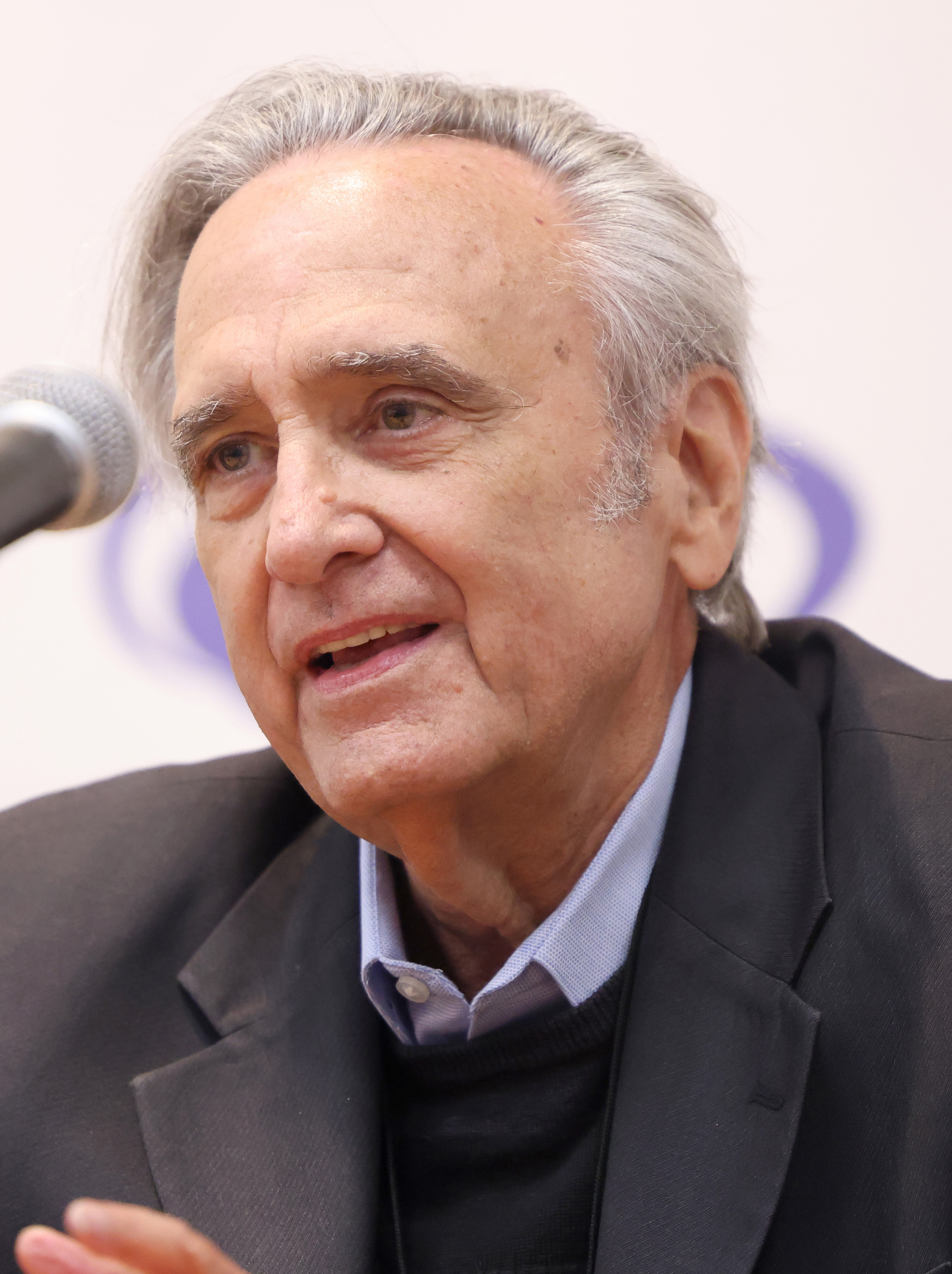
Dante promoting Gremlins: The Wild Batch at the 2025 WonderCon

In 2020, Dante served as a consultant on the HBO Max prequel series Gremlins: Secrets of the Mogwai.

In 2024, it was announced that Dante would direct Little Shop of Halloween Horrors, a reboot of Roger Corman's The Little Shop of Horrors, to be produced by Corman alongside Brad Krevoy, CEO of the Motion Picture Corporation of America, and written by Charles S. Haas. The following year, Dante updated that, like many of his past projects, the film had too been shelved.

== Influences ==
Dante has cited Roger Corman, Chuck Jones, Frank Tashlin, Ernst Lubitsch, Mario Bava, James Whale and Jean Cocteau among his major influences.

Some of Dante's favorite films include Ernst Lubitsch's To Be or Not to Be (1942), Sergio Leone's Once Upon a Time in the West (1968), Orson Welles' Touch of Evil (1958), Charles Laughton's The Night of the Hunter (1955) and James Whale's Bride of Frankenstein (1935). He also loves the 1941 comedy Hellzapoppin', a film from which he frequently steals gags.

The director previously named his top five horror picks as The Innocents, Rosemary's Baby, The Old Dark House, Blood and Black Lace and The Black Cat.

== Archive ==
The moving image collection of Joe Dante and Jon Davison is held at the Academy Film Archive. The joint collection includes feature films, pre-production elements, and theatrical trailer reels.

== Awards ==
Dante was the first recipient of the Vincent Price Award, presented by Vincent's daughter Victoria Price, as part of Hollywood Horrorfest at the New Beverly Cinema in Los Angeles on March 28 2014. Created by festival founder Miles Flanagan and Victoria Price, the award “celebrates Vincent Price’s unique artistic and iconic legacy by honoring an artist whose work has achieved equally iconic status in the horror/fantasy genres.” The event fundraised for the Vincent Price Art Museum.

Later recipients include Cassandra Peterson, Sid Haig, John Landis and Rick Baker.

== Unrealized projects ==
Year	Title and description	Ref.
1970s	Lovekill, a horror film co-written with Paul Bartel and Mike Wakely	
1970s	A film adaptation of John Brunner's novel The Sheep Look Up	
1970s	A film adaptation of James Tiptree Jr.'s short story "The Screwfly Solution"	
1970s	Jaws: 3, People: 0, an early attempt of another Jaws sequel pitched as a spoof	
1980s	Something Wicked This Way Comes	
1980s	Halloween III: Season of the Witch	
1980s	Meltdown, a film written by Charles H. Eglee	
1980s	The Philadelphia Experiment	
1980s	Halloween 4: The Return of Michael Myers	
1980s	The Batman, a film based on the eponymous character written by Tom Mankiewicz starring John Lithgow as the Joker	
1980s	The Good, the Bad and the Ugly 2, a proposed sequel to the 1966 film	
1980s	A remake of the 1954 film Creature from the Black Lagoon	
1980s	A film adaptation of the trading card series Dinosaurs Attack! written by Charles S. Haas	
1980s	A film adaptation of the DC Comics character Plastic Man	
1980s	Little Man Tate	
1980s	A film adaptation of Jonathan Swift's novel Gulliver's Travels written by Terry Jones	
1990s	Jurassic Park	
1990s	A contemporary-set film adaptation of Jack London's novel The Sea-Wolf starring Tom Hanks or Steve Guttenberg	
1990s	A film adaptation of Mark Twain's novel Adventures of Huckleberry Finn	
1990s	Termite Terrace, a biopic about Warner Bros. animator Chuck Jones written by Charles S. Haas	
1990s	Milk Money	
1990s	The Brink, a thriller written by Nicholas Seldon and Robert Skotak set in the world of virtual reality	
1990s	An early attempt of The Mummy remake written by John Sayles set in contemporary times	
1990s	The Phantom	
1990s	Cat and Mouse, retitled from Rupert and Murdoch, a live-action/animated comedy written by Neil Tolkin	
1990s	The Island of Dr. Moreau	
1990s	My Favorite Martian starring Martin Short	
1990s	A live-action film adaptation of the cartoon series The Jetsons written by Scott Alexander and Larry Karaszewski	
1990s	Intolerable Cruelty starring Jeremy Irons and Heather Locklear	
1990s	Sacred Estates, a black comedy written by David Dean Bottrell	
1990s	A remake of the 1946 film noir Crack-Up	
1990s	The Sixth Day	
1990s	A segment of an anthology horror film titled Really Scary written by Charles S. Haas	
2000s	Blood Relative, a thriller written by David and Peter Griffiths about a young geneticist who discovers his grandfather was a convicted criminal	
2000s	Everybody Hates the Phone Company, a biopic of computer hacker Kevin Poulsen	
2000s	Godzilla Reborn, a sequel to Godzilla 2000 written by Michael Schlesinger starring Bruce Campbell, Jamie Lee Curtis, Scott Bakula, Christopher Lee, Leonard Nimoy, Ken Takakura, Bob Picardo, Belinda Balaski and Dick Miller	
2000s	A film adaptation of The Devil Rides Out starring Christopher Lee	
2000s	Mindhunters	
2000s	A sequel to his film Innerspace	
2000s	The Wylde Bunch, a TV series written by John Sayles about a fictional 1970s low-budget film producer	
2000s	The Man with Kaleidoscope Eyes, a biopic written by Tim Lucas, Charlie Largent, Michael Almereyda and James Robison centering on Roger Corman's making of The Trip	
2000s	A film adaptation of Tom Holt's novel Expecting Someone Taller	
2000s	Bat Out of Hell, an indie horror film written by Drew McWeeny and Scott Swan about airplane hijackers who confront monstrous cargo	
2010s	Ombra Amore, retitled from Monster Love, a horror-comedy written by Greg Pak about a werewolf and a vampire who fall in love	
2010s	Fear Paris, retitled from Paris, I'll Kill You, a horror anthology film with segments directed by Dante, Xavier Gens and Timo Vuorensola	
2010s	Hart's Location, an independent drama written by Ashley Reed starring Bruce Dern, Laura Dern and Diane Ladd	
2010s	O2, a sci-fi thriller written by Ronnie Christensen	
2010s	A film adaptation of M. R. James' short story "Casting the Runes" starring Simon Pegg	
2010s	Air Disturbance, a horror thriller written by Jeremy Sklar starring Robert Englund and Dylan Walsh	
2010s	Labirintus, a supernatural thriller written by Alan Campbell starring Mark Webber, Rachel Hurd-Wood and Lorànt Deutsch	
2010s	Polybius, an adventure-thriller written by Barry Stiglets	
2020s	Little Shop of Halloween Horrors, a reboot of The Little Shop of Horrors written by Charles S. Haas	

Dante has also turned down the opportunities to direct Humanoids from the Deep (1980), Airplane! (1980), The Flintstones (1994), Casper (1995), and The World Is Not Enough (1999).

== Filmography ==
=== Film ===
Year	Title	Director	Editor	Notes
1976	Hollywood Boulevard	Yes	Yes	Co-directed with Allan Arkush
1977	Grand Theft Auto	No	Yes	
1978	Piranha	Yes	Yes	
1979	Rock 'n' Roll High School	Uncredited	No	Directed some scenes, also story co-writer
1981	The Howling	Yes	Yes	
1983	Twilight Zone: The Movie	Partial	Uncredited	Segment: "It's a Good Life"
1984	Gremlins	Yes	No	
1985	Explorers	Yes	No	
1987	Innerspace	Yes	No	
1987	Amazon Women on the Moon	Partial	No	Various segments
1989	The 'Burbs	Yes	No	
1990	Gremlins 2: The New Batch	Yes	No	
1993	Matinee	Yes	No	
1998	Small Soldiers	Yes	No	
2003	Looney Tunes: Back in Action	Yes	No	
2006	Trapped Ashes	Partial	No	"Wraparound" segments
2009	The Hole	Yes	No	
2014	Burying the Ex	Yes	No	
2018	Nightmare Cinema	Partial	No	Segment: "Mirari"

Executive producer

- The Phantom (1996)
- Trail of Blood (2011)
- Dark (2015)
- Trafficked (2017)
- Camp Cold Brook (2018)

=== Television ===
Year(s)	Title	Director	Producer	Notes
1982	Police Squad!	Yes	No	Directed 2 episodes
1985	The Twilight Zone	Yes	No	Episode: "The Shadow Man"
1986	Amazing Stories	Yes	No	Directed 2 episodes
1991–1992	Eerie, Indiana	Yes	No	Directed 5 episodes
1994	Flesh and Blood: The Hammer Heritage of Horror	No	Associate	Television documentary
1994	Runaway Daughters	Yes	No	Television film
1995	Picture Windows	Yes	No	Episode: "Lightning"
1997	The Second Civil War	Yes	No	Television film
1998	The Warlord: Battle for the Galaxy	Yes	Executive	Television film
2001	Night Visions	Yes	No	Directed 2 episodes
2002–2003	Jeremiah	No	Executive	
2005–2006	Masters of Horror	Yes	No	Episode: "Homecoming"
2005–2006	Masters of Horror	Yes	No	Episode: "The Screwfly Solution"
2007–present	Trailers from Hell	No	Yes	
2007	CSI: NY	Yes	No	Episode: "Boo"
2011–2017	Hawaii Five-0	Yes	No	Directed 11 episodes
2014	Witches of East End	Yes	No	Directed 2 episodes
2015–2016	Salem	Yes	No	Directed 2 episodes
2016	Legends of Tomorrow	Yes	No	Episode: "Night of the Hawk"
2016	MacGyver	Yes	No	Episode: "Wire Cutter"
2023–2025	Gremlins: Secrets of the Mogwai	No	Consulting	

=== Miscellaneous ===
Year	Title	Notes
1968	The Movie Orgy	Compilation of pre-existing clips
1994	The Twilight Zone Tower of Terror	Theme park pre-show film
2003	Haunted Lighthouse	Short 4D film
2009	Splatter	Interactive web series

=== Cameo and documentary appearances ===
Year	Title	Role	Notes
1973	Submersion of Japan	Unknown	U.S. version only
1976	Hollywood Boulevard	Party Waiter	Uncredited
1976	Cannonball	Kid	
1978	Piranha	Scuba Diver #2	Uncredited
1979	Rock 'n' Roll High School	Riot Cop with Sunglasses	Uncredited
1982	A Time to Die	Bodyguard	
1982	Eating Raoul	Busboy	Uncredited
1985	The Fantasy Film Worlds of George Pal	Himself	
1987	Innerspace	Vectorscope Employee	Uncredited
1990	Gremlins 2: The New Batch	Director	Uncredited
1991	Oscar	Face on the Cutting Room Floor	
1992	Sleepwalkers	Lab Assistant	
1992	The Magical World of Chuck Jones	Himself	
1994	The Silence of the Hams	Dying Man	
1994	Beverly Hills Cop III	Jailer	
1994	A Century of Cinema	Himself	
2002	Cinerama Adventure	Himself	
2004	Edgar G. Ulmer: The Man Off-Screen	Himself	
2004	The Cutting Edge: The Magic of Movie Editing	Himself	
2006	Coming Attractions: The History of the Movie Trailer	Himself	
2007	Famous Monster: Forrest J. Ackerman	Himself	
2007	To My Great Chagrin: The Unbelievable Story of Brother Theodore	Himself	
2007	Spine Tingler! The William Castle Story	Himself	
2009	Nightmares in Red, White and Blue	Himself	
2010	American Grindhouse	Himself	
2010	Machete Maidens Unleashed!	Himself	
2010	The Man Who Saw Frankenstein Cry	Himself	
2011	Corman's World: Exploits of a Hollywood Rebel	Himself	
2011	The Legend of Ivan Tors	Himself	
2011	Ray Harryhausen: Special Effects Titan	Himself	
2012	The Butterfly Room	Taxi Driver	
2012	Beast Wishes	Himself	
2012	The AckerMonster Chronicles!	Himself	
2012	Trailer War	Himself	
2013	A Fuller Life	Himself	
2013	Clawing! A Journey Through the Spanish Horror	Himself	
2014	That Guy Dick Miller	Himself	
2014	Out of Print	Himself	
2015	Eaten Alive! The Rise and Fall of the Italian Cannibal Film	Himself	
2015	Tales of Halloween	Professor Milo Gottlieb	Segment: "Bad Seed"
2015	Creature Designers: The Frankenstein Complex	Himself	
2016	24x36: A Movie About Movie Posters	Himself	
2016	Long Live the King	Himself	
2016	Unspeakable Horrors: The Plan 9 Conspiracy	Himself	
2017	King Cohen	Himself	
2017	Sad Hill Unearthed	Himself	
2018	Hammer Horror: The Warner Bros Years	Himself	
2019	Love, Antosha	Himself	
2019	Making Apes: The Artists Who Changed Film	Himself	
2019	Phil Tippett: Mad Dreams and Monsters	Himself	
2019	In Search of Darkness	Himself	
2020	Frankenstein and the Two Faces of Eve	Himself	
2020	Skin: A History of Nudity in the Movies	Himself	
2020	In Search of Darkness: Part II	Himself	
2020	Tales of the Uncanny	Himself	
2020	The Birth of Hammer Horror	Himself	
2021	Boris Karloff: The Man Behind the Monster	Himself	
2022	Blood, Guts and Sunshine	Himself	
2022	In Search of Tomorrow	Himself	
2022	Razzennest	Narrator	
2022	In Search of Darkness: Part III	Himself	
2023	Sharksploitation	Himself	
2024	The Life and Deaths of Christopher Lee	Himself	
2024	Hammer: Heroes, Legends and Monsters	Himself	
2025	Ishiro Honda: Memoirs of a Film Director	Himself	
2025	Boorman and the Devil	Himself	
2025	The Vincent Price Legacy	Himself	
2026	Dernsie: The Amazing Life of Bruce Dern	Himself	
2026	Walking with Animators	Himself	
2026	Forrest J Ackerman: Bridge to Metropolis	Himself	

== Bibliography ==
- Nil Baskar, Gabe Klinger (Ed.): Joe Dante, FilmmuseumSynemaPublikationen Vol. 19, Vienna: SYNEMA - Gesellschaft für Film und Medien, 2013, ISBN 9783901644528
- Dante, Jr., Joe (July 1962). "Dante's Inferno". Famous Monsters. Vol. 4, no. 3. Central Publications, Inc.
