= Dick Miller =

American actor (1928–2019)

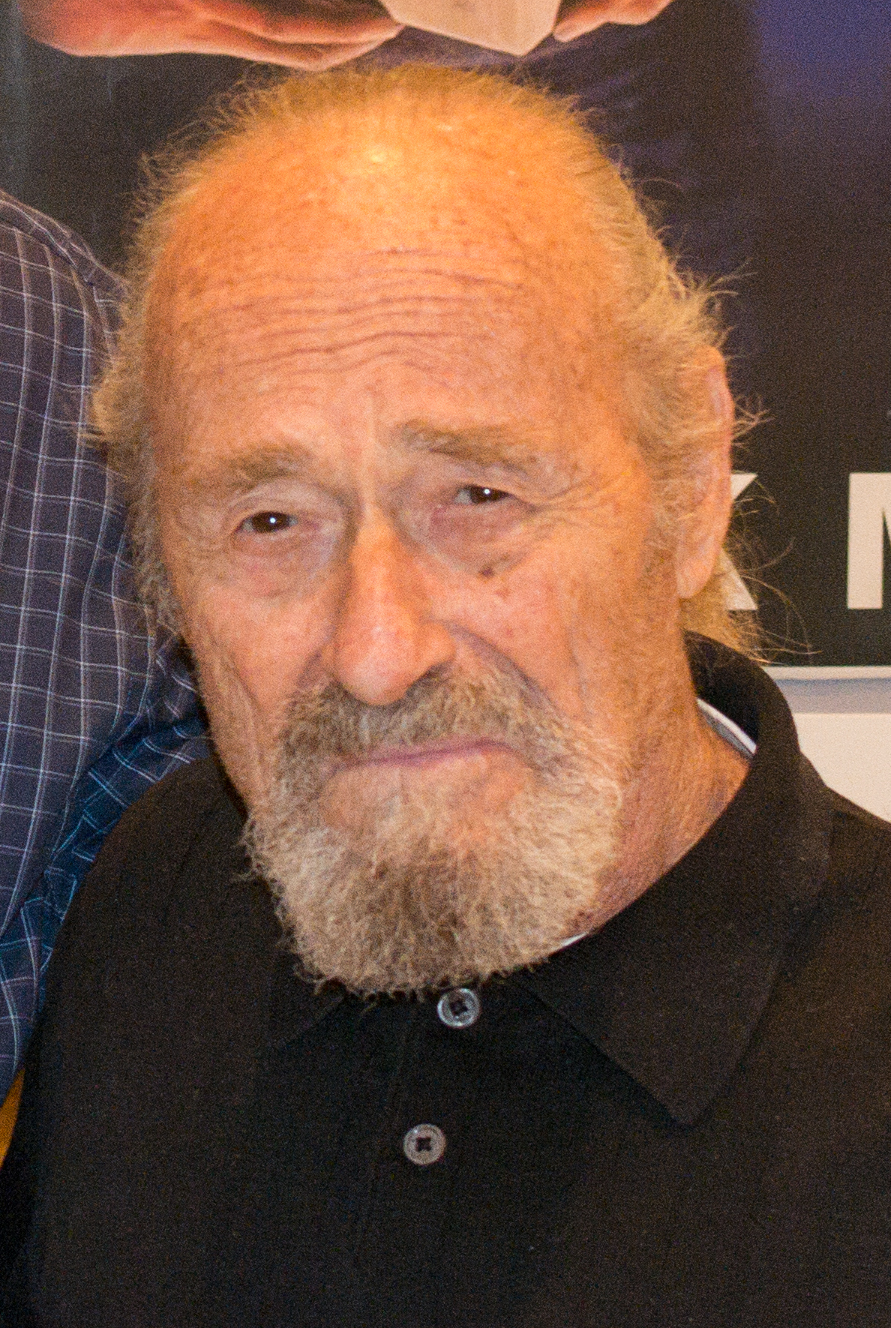
- Miller at the Chiller Theatre Expo in 2015
- Born: Richard Miller; December 25, 1928; The Bronx, New York City, U.S.
- Died: January 30, 2019 (aged 90); Toluca Lake, California, U.S.
- Education: City College of New York; Columbia University; New York University
- Occupation: Actor
- Years active: 1955–2019
- Spouse: Sheila Elaine Halpern (m. 1967)
- Children: 1
- Military career
- Allegiance: United States
- Branch: United States Navy

Richard Miller (December 25, 1928 – January 30, 2019) was an American character actor who appeared in more than 180 films, including many produced by Roger Corman. He later appeared in the films of directors who began their careers with Corman, including Joe Dante, James Cameron, and Martin Scorsese, with the distinction of appearing in every film directed by Dante. His turn in Dante's 1985 sci-fi drama Explorers earned Miller a nomination for a Saturn Award for Best Supporting Actor. He was known for playing the beleaguered everyman, often in one-scene appearances.

Miller's main roles in films included Not of This Earth (1957), A Bucket of Blood (1959), The Little Shop of Horrors (1960), Piranha (1978), The Howling (1981), Gremlins, The Terminator (both 1984), Chopping Mall, Night of the Creeps (both 1986), The 'Burbs (1989), Gremlins 2: The New Batch (1990), Demon Knight (1995), and Small Soldiers (1998).

== Early life ==
Miller was born on Christmas Day, 1928, in The Bronx, New York, the son of Russian Jewish immigrants, Ira Miller, a printer, and Rita (Blucher), an opera singer. He served a tour of duty in the United States Navy. Miller attended the City College of New York, Columbia University, and New York University, eventually attaining a PhD in psychology. He was a writer before turning to acting.

== Career ==
While working as a graduate psychologist, Miller performed on Broadway and also worked at the Bellevue Hospital Mental Hygiene Clinic and the psychiatric department of Queens General Hospital. In 1952, he moved to California seeking work as a writer. One of his earliest acting roles was in Apache Woman (1955). He played one of the townspeople and also a separate role as an Indian. In an action scene his townsperson character shoots his Indian character, as related in the documentary Corman's World.

His movie roles include White Line Fever, The Terminator, All The Right Moves, Night of the Creeps, Small Soldiers, It Conquered the World, A Bucket of Blood, The Little Shop of Horrors, the Tales from the Crypt movie Demon Knight, Amazon Women on the Moon, Chopping Mall, The Howling, Piranha and I Wanna Hold Your Hand. His best known role was in the movies Gremlins and Gremlins 2: The New Batch as Murray Futterman. He appeared in Pulp Fiction as Monster Joe, but his scene and a few others were deleted because of the film's length. He also appeared in Rod Stewart's video for the song "Infatuation" in 1984, with Mike Mazurki and Kay Lenz.

His television credits include as a Townsman on the 1963 TV Western Gunsmoke (S9E8's "Carter Caper"), in Combat!, as a young soldier in the 5th-season episode "The Outsider"; Police Squad! (a 1980s crime spoof series with Leslie Nielsen); V: The Final Battle as Dan Pascal; three seasons as the generous bartender Lou Mackie on Fame; Star Trek: The Next Generation, in the season 1 episode "The Big Goodbye", as the newspaper stand man in the holodeck; Star Trek: Deep Space Nine, in the season 3 two-part episode "Past Tense", as Vin; Time of Your Life; as a prison guard in Soap (1979); and as the voice of the gangster Chuckie Sol in the animated feature film Batman: Mask of the Phantasm. He also directed television shows, including "The Fix", a 1986 episode of the series Miami Vice.

In 2000, Miller was featured alongside former collaborators including Roger Corman, Sam Arkoff and Peter Bogdanovich in the documentary SCHLOCK! The Secret History of American Movies, a film about the rise and fall of American exploitation cinema. In 2014 he appeared in a documentary of his life, That Guy Dick Miller. He is also credited for appearing in a Sega CD video game, Prize Fighter, as corner man for the main character.

=== Walter Paisley ===
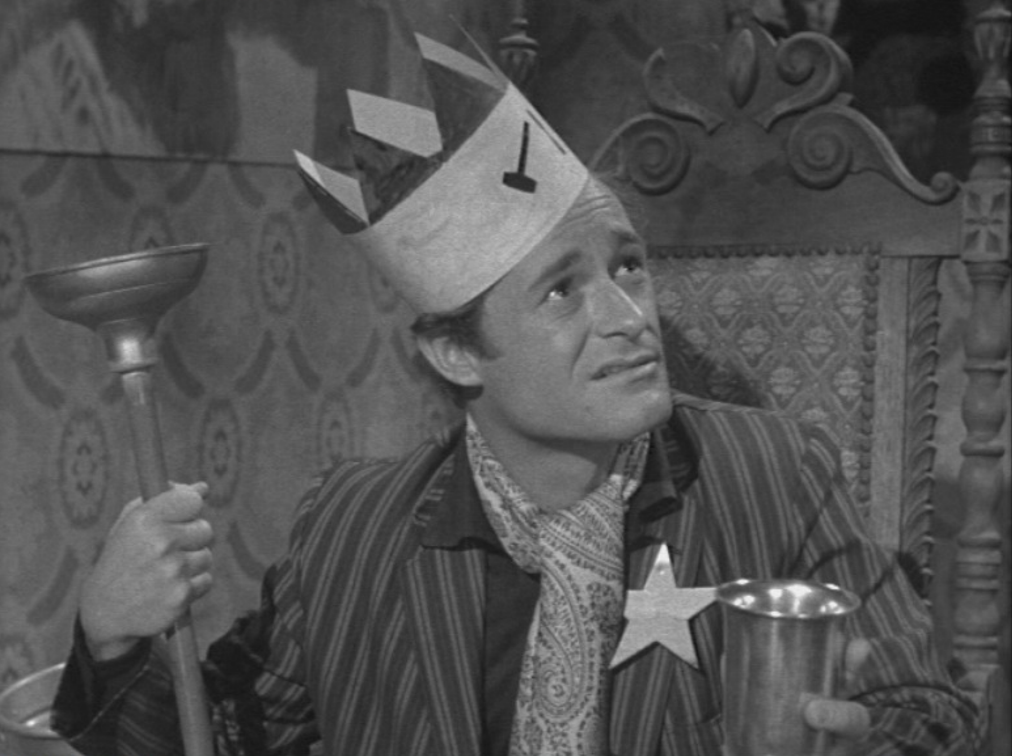
Miller in A Bucket of Blood (1959)

Throughout his career, Miller portrayed several fictional characters all named Walter Paisley. He once noted, "I've played Walter Paisley five times now, I think." By 2011, the character name had actually appeared in Miller's acting credits six times, and twice more with other actors on stage and screen. The name first appeared in the Roger Corman film A Bucket of Blood, with a story centred on Paisley, a busboy who becomes an artist of sorts by killing his subjects and covering them in plaster. In 1976, Miller again portrayed a Walter Paisley — this time, a talent agent and former actor – in another Corman production, Hollywood Boulevard, directed by Allan Arkush and Joe Dante. In one scene of the film, Miller watches himself onscreen at a drive-in theatre showing of The Terror – along with the Paisley name, this was one of several Corman/American International references and in-jokes in the finished production.

Dante cast Miller as another Walter Paisley, the owner of an occult bookshop, in the 1981 film The Howling. Two years later, the name appeared again attached to another Miller role, this time as the owner of a diner in the third segment of Twilight Zone: The Movie. The 1986 horror film Chopping Mall featured a janitor named Walter Paisley; and the 1994 made-for-TV remake of Shake, Rattle and Rock! had Miller playing a policeman, Officer Paisley. Officer Paisley also appeared in Night of the Creeps. Miller played a variation on the role one last time in his final, posthumously released film, Hanukkah. Two other actors have portrayed the Walter Paisley from A Bucket of Blood: Anthony Michael Hall in the 1995 television remake; and James Stanton in the musical adaptation produced by Chicago's Annoyance Theatre.

== Personal life ==
Miller married Sheila Elaine "Lainie" Halpern (1941–2025) on October 6, 1959, and they had one child together, Barbara.

== Death ==
Miller died at age 90 of a heart attack on January 30, 2019, while being treated for pneumonia in Toluca Lake, Los Angeles.

== Filmography ==
=== Film ===
Year	Title	Role	Director	Notes
1955	Apache Woman	Tall Tree	Roger Corman	
1956	The Oklahoma Woman	The Bartender	Roger Corman	
1956	Gunslinger	Jimmy Tonto	Roger Corman	
1956	It Conquered the World	Sergeant Neil	Roger Corman	
1957	Naked Paradise	Mitch	Roger Corman	
1957	Not of This Earth	Joe Piper	Roger Corman	
1957	The Undead	The Leper	Roger Corman	
1957	Rock All Night	"Shorty"	Roger Corman	
1957	Sorority Girl	Mort	Roger Corman	
1957	Carnival Rock	Benny	Roger Corman	
1958	War of the Satellites	Dave Boyer	Roger Corman	
1959	A Bucket of Blood	Walter Paisley	Roger Corman	
1960	The Little Shop of Horrors	Burson Fouch	Roger Corman	
1961	Atlas	Greek Soldier	Roger Corman	Uncredited
1961	Capture That Capsule	Ed Nowak	Will Zens	
1962	Premature Burial	"Mole"	Roger Corman	
1963	The Terror	Stefan	Roger Corman	
1963	X: The Man with the X-ray Eyes	Heckler	Roger Corman	Uncredited
1965	The Girls on the Beach	First Waiter	William Witney	Uncredited
1965	Ski Party	Taxi Driver	Alan Rafkin	Uncredited
1965	Beach Ball	Cop #1	Lennie Weinrib	
1966	Wild Wild Winter	Rilk	Lennie Weinrib	
1966	The Wild Angels	Rigger	Roger Corman	
1967	The Dirty Dozen	MP At Hanging	Robert Aldrich	Uncredited
1967	The St. Valentine's Day Massacre	Gangster Dressed As A Cop	Roger Corman	Uncredited
1967	A Time for Killing	Zollicoffer	Phil Karlson	
1967	The Trip	Cash	Roger Corman	
1968	The Wild Racers	Pit Crew Mechanic	Daniel Haller; Roger Corman	
1968	The Legend of Lylah Clare	Reporter At Press Party	Robert Aldrich	Uncredited
1972	Night Call Nurses	Mr. Jensen	Jonathan Kaplan	
1973	The Student Teachers	Coach Harris	Jonathan Kaplan	
1973	The Slams	Taxi Driver	Jonathan Kaplan	
1973	Executive Action	Rifleman, Team B	David Miller	
1973	The Young Nurses	Cop	Clint Kimbrough	
1973	Fly Me	Taxi Driver	Cirio Santiago	
1974	Truck Turner	Fogarty	Jonathan Kaplan	
1974	Big Bad Mama	Bonney	Steve Carver	
1974	Candy Stripe Nurses	The Spectator	Alan Holleb	
1974	Summer School Teachers	Sam	Barbara Peeters	
1975	Capone	Joe Pryor	Steve Carver	
1975	Death Race 2000	Chicken Gang	Paul Bartel	Uncredited
1975	White Line Fever	"Birdie" Corman	Jonathan Kaplan	
1975	Darktown Strutters	Officer Hugo	William Witney	
1975	Crazy Mama	Wilbur Janeway	Jonathan Demme	
1976	Hollywood Boulevard	Walter Paisley	Joe Dante	
1976	Cannonball	Bennie Buckman	Paul Bartel	
1976	Moving Violation	Mack	Charles S. Dubin	
1976	Vigilante Force	The Pianist	George Armitage	
1977	Mr. Billion	Bernie	Jonathan Kaplan	
1977	New York, New York	The Palm Club Owner	Martin Scorsese	
1977	Game Show Models	The Game Show Host	David N. Gottlieb	
1978	Starhops	Jerry	Barbara Peeters	
1978	I Wanna Hold Your Hand	Sergeant Brenner	Robert Zemeckis	
1978	Corvette Summer	"Mr. Lucky"	Matthew Robbins	
1978	Piranha	Buck Gardner	Joe Dante	
1979	The Lady in Red	Patek	Lewis Teague	
1979	Rock 'n' Roll High School	Police Chief	Allan Arkush	
1979	11th Victim	Ned, Investigator	Jonathan Kaplan	TV movie
1979	1941	Officer Miller	Steven Spielberg	
1980	The Happy Hooker Goes Hollywood	New York Cop	Alan Roberts	
1980	Used Cars	Man In Bed	Robert Zemeckis	
1980	Dr. Heckyl and Mr. Hype	Irsil / Orson	Charles B. Griffith	
1981	The Howling	Walter Paisley	Joe Dante	
1981	Smokey Bites the Dust	Glen Wilson	Charles B. Griffith	
1981	Heartbeeps	Factory Watchman	Allan Arkush	
1982	National Lampoon's Movie Madness	Dr. Hans Kleiner	Bob Giraldi	Segment: "Success Wanters"
1982	White Dog	Animal Trainer	Samuel Fuller	
1982	Vortex	Bit Part	Beth B Scott B	
1982	The Aftermath	Broadcaster	Steve Barkett; Ted V. Mikels	Voice
1983	Heart Like a Wheel	Mickey White	Jonathan Kaplan	
1983	Twilight Zone: The Movie	Walter Paisley	Joe Dante	Segment: "It's a Good Life"
1983	Space Raiders	Mel "Crazy Mel"	Howard R. Cohen	
1983	Get Crazy	Susie's Dad	Allan Arkush	
1983	All the Right Moves	Teacher In Auditorium	Michael Chapman	
1983	Lies	The Producer	Jim Wheat; Ken Wheat	
1984	Swing Shift	Wallflower At The Swing Shift Jamboree	Jonathan Demme	Uncredited
1984	Gremlins	Murray Futterman	Joe Dante	
1984	The Terminator	Rob Garrett	James Cameron	
1985	Explorers	Charlie Drake	Joe Dante	
1985	After Hours	Pete, Diner Waiter	Martin Scorsese	
1986	Chopping Mall	Walter Paisley	Jim Wynorski	
1986	Night of the Creeps	Walt	Fred Dekker	
1986	Armed Response	Steve	Fred Olen Ray	
1987	Project X	Max King	Jonathan Kaplan	
1987	Face Like a Frog	Max	Sally Cruikshank	
1987	Innerspace	Cab Driver	Joe Dante	
1987	Amazon Women on the Moon	Danny Clayton	Various	Segment: "The French Ventiloquist's Dummy" (TV cut & DVD only); Uncredited
1988	Under the Boardwalk	Official	Fritz Kiersch	
1988	Angel III: The Final Chapter	Nick Pellegrini	Tom DeSimone	
1988	Dead Heat	Cemetery Security Guard	Mark Goldblatt	Uncredited
1989	The 'Burbs	Vic, The Garbageman	Joe Dante	
1989	Far from Home	Sheriff Bill Childers	Meiert Avis	
1989	Ghost Writer	Club Manager	Kenneth J. Hall	
1990	Gremlins 2: The New Batch	Murray Futterman	Joe Dante	
1990	Mob Boss	Mike	Fred Olen Ray	
1991	Motorama	Horseshoe Player	Barry Shils	
1992	Evil Toons	Burt	Fred Olen Ray	
1992	Body Waves	Mr. Matthews	P.J. Pesce	
1992	Unlawful Entry	Impound Clerk	Jonathan Kaplan	
1992	Quake	The Storekeeper	Louis Morneau	
1993	Matinee	Herb Denning	Joe Dante	
1993	Batman: Mask of the Phantasm	Chuckie Sol	Eric Radomski Bruce Timm	Voice
1994	Pulp Fiction	Joe "Monster Joe"	Quentin Tarantino	(scenes deleted)
1994	Mona Must Die	Father Stilicato	Donald Reiker	
1995	Demon Knight	Uncle Willy	Ernest R. Dickerson	
1995	Number One Fan	The Night Manager	Jane Simpson	
1997	The Second Civil War	Eddie O'Neill	Joe Dante	Television film
1998	The Warlord: Battle for the Galaxy	The Peddler	Joe Dante	Television film
1998	Small Soldiers	Joe, The Truck Driver	Joe Dante	
2001	Route 666	The Bartender	William Wesley	
2003	Looney Tunes: Back in Action	Security Chief	Joe Dante	
2006	Trapped Ashes	Max	Joe Dante	Segments: "Wraparound"
2007	Trail of the Screaming Forehead	Eddie	Larry Blamire	
2009	The Hole	Pizza Delivery Guy	Joe Dante	Uncredited
2009	3rd Shift: Michael's Lament	The Sculptor	Christopher D. Grace	
2014	Burying the Ex	Grumpy Cop	Joe Dante	
2014	That Guy Dick Miller	Himself	Elijah Drenner	Documentary
2015	The Adventures of Biffle and Shooster	Walter	Michael Schlesinger	
2015	Schmo Boat	Walter	Michael Schlesinger	Short
2019	Hanukkah	Rabbi Walter Paisley	Eben McGarr	Posthumous release; Final film role

=== Television ===
Year	Title	Role	Director	Notes
1967	Dragnet 1967	Harry Johnson	Jack Webb	Episode: "The Shooting"
1979	Taxi	Ernie the Waiter	James Burrows	Episode: "The Lighter Side of Angela Matusa"
1979	Soap	The Guard	John Bowab	Episode: # 2.19
1982	Police Squad!	Vic	Joe Dante	Episode: "Testimony of Evil (Dead Men Don't Laugh)"
1982	Taxi	Fergie	Michael Zinberg	Episode: "Travels With My Dad"
1984	V: The Final Battle	Dan Pascal	Richard T. Heffron	1 Episode
1984-1987	Fame	Lou Mackie	Various	Recurring role (30 episodes)
1988	Star Trek: The Next Generation	News Stand Vendor	Joseph L. Scanlon	Episode: "The Big Goodbye"
1990-1991	The Flash	Fosnight	Various	6 episodes
1993	Fallen Angels	Carl	Various	2 episodes
1994	Rebel Highway	Roy Farrell	Joe Dante and Allan Arkush	2 episodes
1994	Batman: The Animated Series	Boxy Bennett	Bruce Timm	Voice, 2 episodes
1994	Lois & Clark: The New Adventures of Superman	Mike Lane	Robert Singer	Episode: "Church of Metropolis"
1995	Star Trek: Deep Space Nine	Vin	Reza Badiyi and Jonathan Frakes	Episode: "Past Tense"
1999	ER	Mr Ackerman	David Chameides	Episode: "Double Blind"
1999	NYPD Blue	Carl Bode	Donna Deitch	Episode: "I’ll Draw You a Mapp"
2005	Justice League Unlimited	Oberon	Bruce Timm	Voice, episode: "The Ties that Bind"
