= Gremlin (disambiguation) =

A gremlin is a mythological mischievous creature.

Gremlin or gremlins may also refer to:

== Arts and entertainment ==
- Gremlins, a film released in 1984
  - Gremlins (franchise), a franchise based on 1984 film
  - One of several video game versions or spin-offs of the original film:
    - Gremlins (Atari 2600 video game), a 1984 video game published by Atari Inc.
    - Gremlins (Atari 5200 video game), a 1986 video game published by Atari Corp.
    - Gremlins: The Adventure, a 1985 interactive fiction computer game by Adventure International
    - Gremlins: Unleashed!, a 2001 video game for the Game Boy Color
    - Gremlins: Stripe vs Gizmo, a 2002 video game for the Game Boy Advance
    - Gremlins 2: The New Batch, the 1990 film sequel
    - Gremlins 2: The New Batch (video game), a video game based on the 1990 film
    - Gremlins: Secrets of the Mogwai, an animated television series that serves as a prequel to the 1984 film
- Gremlins, Inc., a computer game released in 2016
- "Gremlins", The Keith & Paddy Picture Show season 2, episode 6 (2018)
- The Gremlins, a 1943 book by Roald Dahl
- Falling Hare, character in the 1943 Warner Brothers cartoon
- Gremlin (comics), a Marvel Comics villain, enemy of the Hulk; also two other minor unrelated characters
- Gremlin family of characters in the Cars franchise
- "Gremlin", a song from the 2013 album Old by Danny Brown

== Business ==
- AMC Gremlin, a subcompact car made by American Motors
- Gremlin Industries, an early arcade game manufacturer
- Gremlin Interactive (originally Gremlin Graphics), a British software house
- Gremlin Social, a social media marketing company

== Science and technology ==
- Gremlin (query language), a graph-based query language
- Gremlin (protein), a naturally occurring protein
- Gremlin (genus), a genus of dinosaurs

== Other uses ==
- Gremlin (chimpanzee), a chimpanzee featured in several documentaries
- "The Gremlin", nickname of Emlen Tunnell (1924–1975), American football player and coach
- SA-14 Gremlin, the NATO reporting name for the Russian 9K34 Strela-3 surface-to-air missile system
- Dynetics X-61 Gremlins, an experimental unmanned aerial vehicle by Dynetics
- Newcastle Gremlins, a football hooligan firm associated with the English football club Newcastle United F.C.

== See also ==
- Gremlina, a female professional wrestler from the Gorgeous Ladies of Wrestling
