= Gremlins (franchise) =

Warner Bros. media franchise

- Official franchise logo
- Created by: Chris Columbus
- Original work: Gremlins (1984)
- Owners: Warner Bros. Entertainment; Amblin Entertainment
- Years: 1984–present

Films and television
- Films: Gremlins (1984); Gremlins 2: The New Batch (1990); Gremlins 3 (2028)
- Animated series: Gremlins (2023–2025)

Games
- Video game(s): Gremlins (1984); Gremlins 2: The New Batch (1990); Lego Dimensions (2015); Multiversus (2024)

Miscellaneous
- Theme park attraction: Warner Bros. Classics & Great Gremlins Adventure

Gremlins is an American comedy horror media franchise produced and owned by Warner Bros. and Amblin Entertainment. The franchise centers on a species of creatures known as mogwai (Cantonese: 魔怪, 'devil'), which evolve into the titular imp-like monsters if the three rules regarding their care are violated; in particular, the franchise focuses on the conflict between the friendly Gizmo and the malicious Stripe (also known as Mohawk). The franchise began with the eponymous 1984 film, written by Chris Columbus and directed by Joe Dante; and continued with a sequel, Gremlins 2: The New Batch (1990), also directed by Dante, with a third theatrical film being scheduled for release in 2028. The franchise also includes video games, an animated prequel series and related merchandise.

== Setting ==
=== Mogwai ===
The mogwai are the central species of the franchise, based on eponymous creatures in Chinese folklore. Their volatility is such that whoever comes across one must adhere to three specific rules: A mogwai must not to be exposed to light, especially sunlight, which is lethal to the species; it must not come into contact with water, which results in its multiplication ability; and above all, it must not be fed after midnight, which results in its evolution into a Gremlin, adopting a more reptilian appearance than its mogwai form.

== Films ==
Film	U.S. release date	Director	Writer(s)	Producer	Status
Gremlins	June 8, 1984	Joe Dante	Chris Columbus	Michael Finnell	Released
Gremlins 2: The New Batch	June 15, 1990	Joe Dante	Charles S. Haas	Michael Finnell	Released
Gremlins 3	October 6, 2028	Chris Columbus	Chris Columbus, Zach Lipovsky, Adam Stein, & Hannah Marks	Chris Columbus	Upcoming

=== Gremlins (1984) ===
Gremlins, released June 8, 1984, was directed by Joe Dante, written by Chris Columbus, and produced by Michael Finnell; and stars Zach Galligan, Phoebe Cates, Hoyt Axton, Polly Holliday and Frances Lee McCain, with Howie Mandel providing the voice of Gizmo.

=== Gremlins 2: The New Batch (1990) ===
Gremlins 2: The New Batch, the sequel to Gremlins, was released on June 15, 1990. Like the first film, it was directed by Dante, with Charles S. Haas writing the screenplay. Galligan, Cates, Keye Luke, Dick Miller and Jackie Joseph reprise their roles, with Mandel once again voicing Gizmo.

=== Gremlins 3 (2028) ===
In January 2013, Vulture reported that Warner Bros. was negotiating with Steven Spielberg's Amblin Entertainment to reboot the Gremlins franchise. Seth Grahame-Smith was tapped to produce, alongside David Katzenberg. However, Grahame-Smith has since stated that the project has been put on hold. In November 2015, Zach Galligan confirmed that the third film will be a sequel and not a reboot.

In a December 2016 interview with Bleeding Cool, Galligan said that Chris Columbus had been "aggressively working on a third Gremlins movie", which had writer Carl Ellsworth on board. A 2017 interview with Columbus discussed his "twisted and dark" script which explored the idea that has been on the fans' minds for a long time: "If all the gremlins come from getting Gizmo wet and feeding his mogwai offspring after midnight, should Gizmo be eliminated?" In November 2020, Columbus stated that CGI would not be used for the gremlins and that traditional puppets and animatronics would continue to be used.

In January 2025, it was reported by Deadline that Warner Bros. was developing a third Gremlins movie written and directed by Chris Columbus who was also writing a sequel to The Goonies. On April 11, 2025, a sequel was confirmed by Warner Bros. On November 6, 2025, it was reported that the second sequel has a release date of November 19, 2027. The script will be co-written by Columbus, Zach Lipovsky and Adam Stein. In September 2026, the film was delayed to October 6, 2028. It was also announced that Hannah Marks was writing a new draft of the screenplay alongside Columbus.

== Television ==
=== Gremlins: Secrets of the Mogwai (2023-2025) ===
The CGI animated prequel series Gremlins: Secrets of the Mogwai debuted with the launch of the Max streaming service on May 23, 2023. Serving as a prequel to the films, the series focuses on the young Sam Wing and his adventures with Gizmo.

== Cast and characters ==
List indicators

This section includes characters who will appear or have appeared in more than two films in the series.

- An empty grey cell indicates the character was not in the film, or that the character's official presence has not yet been confirmed.
- ^{V} indicates a voice-only role.
- ^{Y} indicates a younger version of the character.
- ^{S} indicates an appearance as a character's singing voice.

Characters	Film		Television
Characters	Gremlins	Gremlins 2: The New Batch	Gremlins: Secrets of the Mogwai
Gizmo	Howie Mandel^{V} Ilene Keys^{S}	Howie Mandel^{V}	A.J. LoCascio^{V}
Sam Wing	Keye Luke	Keye Luke	Izaac Wang^{V}^{Y}
Billy Peltzer	Zach Galligan	Zach Galligan	
Kate Beringer	Phoebe Cates	Phoebe Cates	
Murray Futterman	Dick Miller	Dick Miller	
Sheila Futterman	Jackie Joseph	Jackie Joseph	
Randall "Rand" Peltzer	Hoyt Axton		
Lynn Peltzer	Frances Lee McCain		
Ruby Deagle	Polly Holliday		
Gerald Hopkins	Judge Reinhold		
Roy Hanson	Glynn Turman		
Sheriff Frank Riley	Scott Brady		
Pete Fountaine	Corey Feldman		
Deputy Brent Frye	Jonathan Banks		
Roland Corben	Edward Andrews		
Mrs. Harris	Belinda Balaski		
Mr. Anderson	Harry Carey Jr.		
Dorry	Kenny Davis		
Barney	Mushroom		
Doctor Molinar	John C. Becher		
Lew Landers	Jim McKrell		
Father Bartlett	William Schallert		
Mr. Jones	Chuck Jones		
Stripe	Frank Welker^{V}		
Rockin' Ricky Rialto	Don Steele^{V}		
Robby the Robot	Marvin Miller^{V}		
Daniel Clamp		John Glover	
Grandpa Fred		Robert Prosky	
Frank Forster		Robert Picardo	
Doctor Cushing Catheter		Christopher Lee	
Marla Bloodstone		Haviland Morris	
Mr. Katsuji		Gedde Watanabe	
Microwave Marge		Kathleen Freeman	
Martin		Don Stanton	
Lewis		Dan Stanton	
Alex		Jason Presson	
Peggy		Julia Sweeney	
Casper		Charles S. Haas	
The Brain Gremlin		Tony Randall^{V}	
Mohawk		Frank Welker^{V}	
Bugs Bunny		Jeff Bergman^{V}	
Daffy Duck		Jeff Bergman^{V}	
Porky Pig		Jeff Bergman^{V}	
John Wayne		Chad Everett^{V}	
Fong Wing			Ming-Na Wen^{V}
Hon Wing			B. D. Wong^{V}
Grandpa Wing			James Hong^{V}

== Additional crew and production details ==
Title	Crew/Detail					
Title	Composer(s)	Cinematographer	Editor(s)	Production companies	Distributing companies	Running time
Gremlins	Jerry Goldsmith	John Hora	Tina Hirsch	Amblin Entertainment	Warner Bros.	1 hr 46 mins
Gremlins 2: The New Batch	Jerry Goldsmith	John Hora	Kent Beyda	Amblin Entertainment	Warner Bros.	1 hr 46 mins
Gremlins 3	—N/a	—N/a	—N/a	Amblin Entertainment; Maiden Voyage Pictures	Warner Bros.	—N/a

== Reception ==
=== Box office performance ===
Film	Release date	Box office gross				Box office ranking		Budget	Ref(s)
Film	Release date	United States opening weekend	North America	Other territories	Worldwide	All time North America	All time worldwide	Budget	Ref(s)
Gremlins	June 8, 1984	$12,511,634	$151,937,605	$12,092,165	$164,029,770	—N/a	—N/a	$11 million	
Gremlins 2: The New Batch	June 15, 1990	$9,702,804	$41,476,097	—N/a	$41,476,097	—N/a	—N/a	$50 million	
Totals			$193,413,702	$12,092,165	$205,505,867			$61 million	

=== Critical and public response ===
Film	Critical		Public
Film	Rotten Tomatoes	Metacritic	CinemaScore
Gremlins	86% (91 reviews)	70 (13 reviews)	—N/a
Gremlins 2: The New Batch	72% (67 reviews)	69 (28 reviews)	B+
Gremlins: Secrets of the Mogwai	100% (21 reviews)	78 (9 reviews)	—N/a
Gremlins: The Wild Batch	100% (7 reviews)	—N/a	—N/a

== In other media ==
=== Books ===
Gremlins was adapted into a novelization by George Gipe, published by Avon Books in June 1984. The novel offered an origin for mogwai and gremlins as a prologue. Supposedly, mogwai were created as gentle, contemplative creatures by a scientist on an alien world. However, it was discovered their physiology was unstable. The result was only 1 in 10,000 mogwai would retain their sweet, loving demeanor. The rest would change into creatures the novel referred to as "mischievous". The minority mogwai (the 1 in 10,000) are immortal by human standards, though Gizmo explains to Stripe if he were to undergo the transformation himself, he would become like the others, "short lived and violent". This origin is unique to the novel but is referred to in the novelization of Gremlins 2 by David Bischoff. No definitive origin for mogwai or gremlins is given in either Gremlins film. The novelization contains a subplot that was cut from the original film, where the National Guard plans to neutralize the gremlins with fire hoses.

A comic book adaptation of Gremlins was published by Western Publishing in 1984.

There were also children's books like Gremlins 2: The New Batch: Movie Storybook, by Michael Teitelbaum, published by Goldencraft in December 1990. Little Golden Books published Gremlins 2: The New Batch: Gizmo to the Rescue in July 1990. In the United Kingdom, William Heinemann Ltd. had published two tie-in picture books from Buzz Books in August 1990 which contains photographs and scenes taken from the film. They were titled Don't Get Wet and Midnight Feast. David Bischoff wrote a novel based on the film published by Avon Books in June 1990. A unique aspect of the novel is how Bischoff adapts the sequence where the film breaks. In the novel, the Brain Gremlin subdues and locks Bischoff in his bathroom before taking the reins for a little bit to explain that the gremlins take over at this point in the film, his displeasure at Bischoff using the nickname "Mr. Glasses" instead of his official name and begins a treatise on politics before Bischoff breaks his way out of the bathroom with an axe and subdues the Brain Gremlin. The novel then continues where the film picked up after the film break.

=== Video games ===
==== Action-oriented video games ====
Multiple officially licensed video games based on the franchise have been produced. One of the first was Gremlins, released by Atari, Inc. for their 2600 console in 1984. Atari, Inc. released a completely different (and more technically advanced) game—also called Gremlins—for the Atari 8-bit computers, Atari 5200, Apple II, Commodore 64, and IBM PC compatibles. Although the 5200 version went to manufacturing in 1984, the turmoil surrounding Jack Tramiel's takeover of Atari's consumer business resulted in it not being released until 1986.

Spanish company Topo Soft developed a side-scrolling Gremlins 2: The New Batch video game for Amiga, Atari ST, Commodore 64, MS-DOS, MSX, Amstrad CPC and ZX Spectrum, distributed by Erbe Software in Spain and by Elite abroad, being the first time a Spanish video game company received an exclusive license from a Hollywood movie for a video game. Hi Tech Expressions also released an MS-DOS game at around the same time, but it was poorly received. Sunsoft released versions for the Nintendo Entertainment System and Game Boy in 1990.

In the 2000s, more games were released. Gremlins: Unleashed! (2001) for the Game Boy Color is about Gizmo trying to catch Stripe and thirty other gremlins, while the gremlins also try to turn Gizmo into a gremlin. Both Gizmo and Stripe are playable characters in the game. Gremlins: Stripe vs. Gizmo (2002) for the Game Boy Advance is a platform game with of 14 levels and 3 playable characters: Stripe, Gizmo, and a Gremlin.

NECA, published Gremlins Gizmo for the Wii and Nintendo DS. It was developed by Pipeworks Software and released on November 18, 2011.

A Gremlins Team Pack was released for Lego Dimensions on November 18, 2016. The pack includes minifigures of Gizmo and Stripe, a constructible polaroid camera and RC car and grants access to an Adventure World and Battle Arena based on the franchise. Howie Mandel and Frank Welker reprise their respective roles as Gizmo and Stripe. The duo additionally became playable characters in the platform fighter MultiVersus.

==== Gremlins: The Adventure ====
An interactive fiction game based on scenes from the film, Gremlins: The Adventure, was released in 1985 for the Acorn Electron, BBC Micro, Commodore 64, and ZX Spectrum. It was written by Brian Howarth for Adventure Soft with color illustrations on some formats.

=== Theme park attractions ===
Warner Bros. Classics and The Great Gremlin Adventure was a dark ride located at Warner Bros. Movie World on the Gold Coast, Australia, and Warner Bros. Movie World in Bottrop, Germany (now Movie Park Germany). On 3 June 1991, Warner Bros. Movie World opened to the public. One of its original attractions was Warner Bros. Classics and The Great Gremlin Adventure. A duplicate of the Australian attraction opened with Warner Bros. Movie World Germany (later renamed Movie Park Germany) on 30 June 1996. It was named Gremlin Invasion. The ride's soft-opening was on 29 June 1996. The ride has been replaced with the Scooby-Doo Spooky Coaster and Van Helsing's Factory in the two parks respectively.
