= Gandalf's Fist =

British rock band

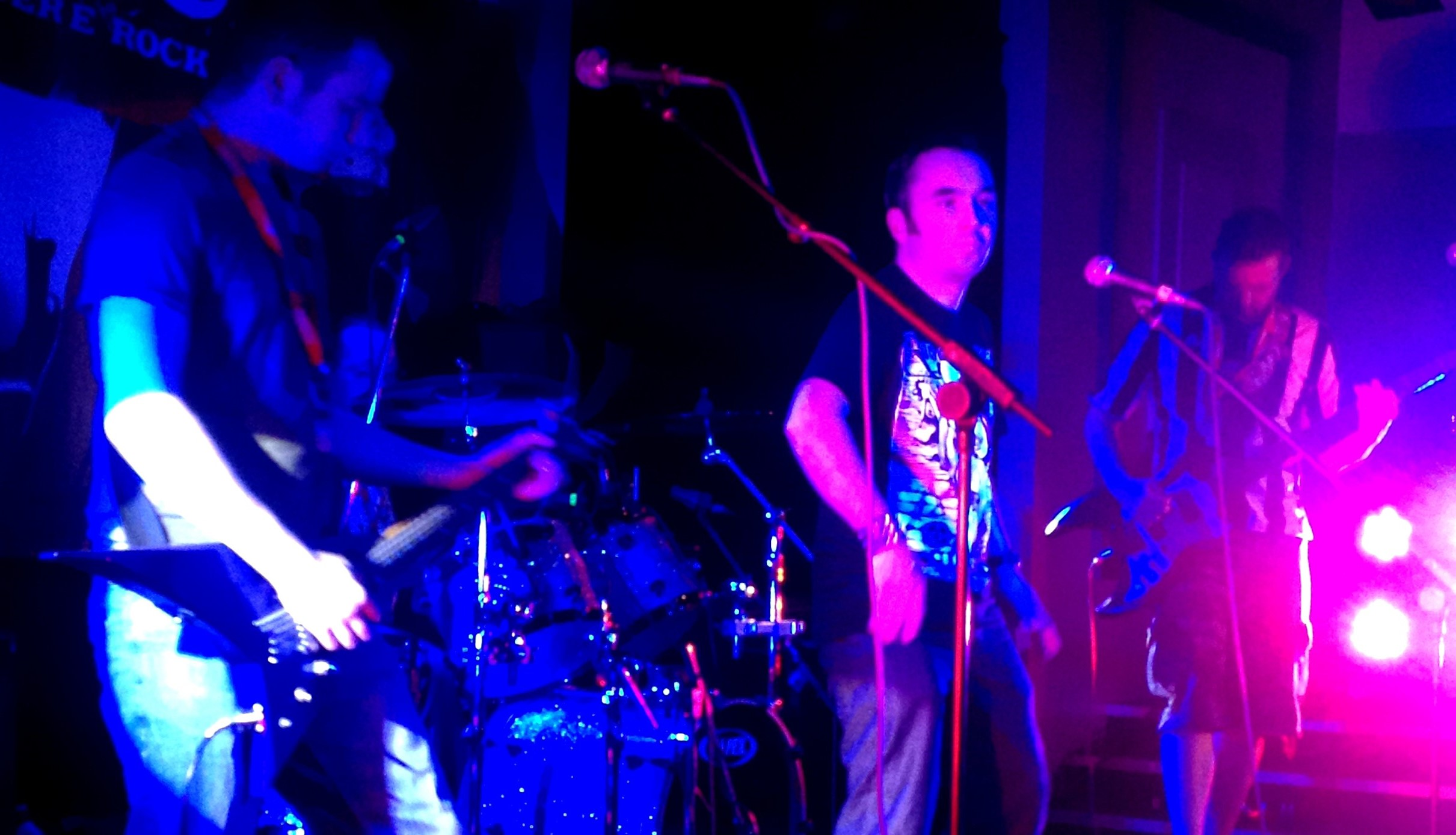
- Gandalf's Fist Live at Great Yarmouth, December 2013

Background information
- Origin: Maryport, Cumbria, England
- Genres: Progressive rock, progressive folk, folk rock
- Years active: 2005–present
- Members: Dean Marsh; Luke Severn; Stefan Hepe; Christopher Ewen; Keri Farish; Ben Bell
- Website: gandalfsfist.com

Gandalf's Fist is an English band originally from Maryport, Cumbria. The band operates and records their own material from their headquarters currently located in South Norfolk. Their music is influenced by 1970s progressive/psychedelic rock. The group formed in 2005, and built their reputation through various airplay by national radio (Planet Rock Radio, Teamrock Radio) with the help of several interviews in the "Classic Rock presents Prog"-Magazine, they cemented their reputation by playing at the "Second Stage" of Planet Rockstock in Great Yarmouth in December 2013, despite being a "initially studio only" project. They were featured in the TOP20 of Geoff Barton's 2013 Critic's choice in PROG Magazine Issue #41.

== History ==
Formed at a nightclub in 2005 when a mutual friend invented a silly band name to try to impress a girl, Gandalf's Fist began as the creative collaboration of multi-instrumentalist Dean Marsh and lyricist-vocalist Luke Severn. Meeting at university and becoming good friends, the duo spent the subsequent two years releasing experimental instrumental tracks. The origins of their music were influenced by the golden era of progressive rock in the 1970s and traditional English folk music.

After their LPs Road to Darkness and From a Point of Existence were favorably reviewed by G. W. Hill at Music Street Journal for their mix of neo-prog, folk and hard rock, they recruited German drummer Stefan Hepe to work on their fourth full release, listing him in the liner notes as one of the "Additional Wanderers Intercepting the Signal". Gandalf's Fist released the subsequent LP A Day in the Life of a Universal Wanderer in September 2013, being the last release by the band under the US label Musik&Film and received widespread coverage from progressive rock journalists (Classic Rock Magazine, Prog Magazine, Powerplay Magazine, Fireworks Magazine).

After accepting the offer to play at the "Second Stage" at Planet Radio "Planet Rockstock" in Great Yarmouth, Gandalf's Fist promoted guest musician drummer Stefan Hepe and touring bassist Christopher Ewen, making them full members.

As a four-piece, the band wrote new material for their fifth full-length release called A Forest of Fey, which features Troy Donockley, John Mitchell, Dave Oberlé and Clive Nolan as guest musicians. It was released on 20 October 2014. A Forest Of Fey received critical acclaim from music critics. The Classic Rock Magazine UK ranked the album #3 of "Best Prog Albums in 2014" and called it "[...] the Fist's finest achievement to date", rating it with 8/10 points.

During the first half of 2015, the band released two EPs at once: an unplugged album containing songs of their career so far, and a "best of" compilation, giving the opportunity to check out a song from every studio album released so far. Three songs were completely re-recorded or mixed, and the album is available as "name your price" via their Bandcamp page.

In November 2015, the band announced work on their sixth album, stating it will again be a concept album planned to be released in 2016. It will be a three-CD album called The Clockwork Fable and will feature the voice talents of Mark Benton, Zach Galligan, Bill Fellows, Paul Kavanagh, Paul Barnhill and Tim Munro, amongst others. They also announced, that Blaze Bayley, Arjen Lucassen, Dave Oberlé (Gryphon) and Matt Stevens (The Fierce and the Dead) are contributing to the new album.

After releasing The Clockwork Fable on 1 May 2016 and receiving much praise for it, they headlined the second stage in March 2017 at the HRH Prog Volume V Festival in Pwllheli with the help of female vocalist Keri Farish and keyboarder Ben Bell (Fusion Orchestra 2, Patchwork Cacophony).

Their videoclip for the song "Shadowborn" (from The Clockwork Fable) was nominated for the Prog Magazine Awards 2017 in the category "Video Of The Year".

After some very successful collaborations with Farish and Bell, the band promoted them to full members in November 2017; they made their debut with the 2017 Christmas single Winter's Mourning, which has been released in early December 2017.

In November 2018, the band had another appearance at the HRH Prog Volume VII Festival in Pwllheli, headlining the second stage once again.

On 1 July 2019, the band released the album "The Clockwork Prologue", a prequel of their 2016 3-CD album "The Clockwork Fable". The 2-CD album is a mix of unused songs from "The Clockwork Fable" and new material and features the actors Mark Benton, Bill Fellows, Paul Kavanagh and Tim Munro in the narrative scenes between the songs; a concept that has already been used for "The Clockwork Fable".

== Personnel ==
=== Members ===
Current members

- Dean Marsh – guitars, keyboards, synthesizers, vocals (2005–present)
- Luke Severn – vocals (2005–present)
- Stefan Hepe – drums and percussion (2013–present)
- Christopher Ewen – bass (2013–present)
- Keri Farish – vocals (2017–present)
- Ben Bell – keyboards (2017–present)

Regular guest musicians

- Melissa Hollick – vocals (2013–present)
- Dying Seed – vocals (2013–present)
- Jennifer Pederson – vocals (2013–2014)
- Rebecca Watson – vocals (2011–2013)

Current guest musicians

- Blaze Bayley - vocals (The Clockwork Fable)
- Arjen Lucassen - vocals (The Clockwork Fable)
- Dave Oberlé - Bodhrán, vocals (A Forest Of Fey, The Clockwork Fable)
- Matt Stevens - guitar (A Forest Of Fey, The Clockwork Fable)
- Nathan Madsen - Saxophone (The Clockwork Fable)

Former guest musicians

- Troy Donockley - Woodwind, Cumbrian Bouzouki and pipes (A Forest Of Fey)
- John Mitchell - vocals (A Forest Of Fey)
- Clive Nolan - synth (A Forest Of Fey)
- Aisling Marsh – vocals (From a Point of Existence)
- Davor Bušic – flutes (A Day in the Life of a Universal Wanderer)
- Suzanne Weller – flutes (A Day in the Life of a Universal Wanderer)
- Andy Bolper – saxophone (A Day in the Life of a Universal Wanderer)
- Lonna Marie – vocals (A Day in the Life of a Universal Wanderer)

=== Lineups ===
2005–2013	2013–2017	2017–present
Dean Marsh – vocals, guitars, keyboards, bass, drums; Luke Severn – vocals	Dean Marsh – vocals, guitars, keyboards; Luke Severn – vocals; Stefan Hepe – drums; Christopher Ewen – bass	Dean Marsh – vocals, guitars, keyboards; Luke Severn – vocals; Stefan Hepe – drums; Christopher Ewen – bass; Keri Farish – female vocals; Ben Bell – keyboards

== Discography ==
=== Studio ===
- The Master and the Monkey (2011), "The (Re)Master and the Monkey" Special Edition (2021)
- Road to Darkness (2011), Special Edition (2018)
- From a Point of Existence (2012)
- A Day in the Life of a Universal Wanderer (2013), Special Edition (2017)
- A Forest of Fey (2014)
- The Clockwork Fable (2016)
- The Clockwork Prologue (2019)
- Widdershins (2022)

=== EPs and singles ===
- Songs From the Solway EP (2011)
- The Wizard's Study EP (2011)
- There and Back Again EP (2012)
- Winter Is Coming EP (2012)
- The Wizard's Study II: Balrog Boogaloo EP (2013)
- Songs From a Winter Forest EP (2013)
- Live From a Post-Apocalyptic Powercut EP (2015, Unplugged)
- Uprooted (2015, Best-of Compilation)
- Winter's Mourning (2017, Christmas Single)
