= The Clockwork Fable =

Studio album by Gandalf's Fist
- Released: 1 May 2016
- Recorded: 2016
- Genre: Progressive rock
- Length: 3:14:02
- Label: Independent
- Producer: Dean Marsh

Gandalf's Fist chronology
A Forest Of Fey (2014)	The Clockwork Fable (2016)	The Clockwork Prologue (2019)

The Clockwork Fable is the sixth studio album by the English progressive rock band Gandalf's Fist. Released on 1 May 2016, it is a three disc spanning rock-opera interspersed with a professionally acted radio play between the actual songs. Each disc of the record serves as an individual element of a traditional three-act structure.

== Reception ==
Professional ratings
Review scores
Source	Rating
Babyblaue Seiten (de)	11/15 stars
Classic Rock Magazine	9/10 stars
DPRP	10/10 stars

Classic Rock Magazine's Geoff Barton wrote "a conceptional tour de force, it reduces Rick Wakeman's The Myths and Legends of King Arthur and the Knights of the Round Table to the level of a Chas & Dave Cockney knees-up." in his review in issue 224, awarding it 9/10 Points.

Prog Magazine's Steve Pilkington writes "[...] Imagine The War Of The Worlds if it had been tackled by Ayreon rather than Jeff Wayne and you’re halfway there. Indeed, Arjen Lucassen’s just one of the guests here, along with Blaze Bayley (Iron Maiden), and prog-savvy actors Mark Benton and Zach ‘Gremlins’ Galligan. [...] this is a career-defining, magical epic."

Fireworks Magazine writes "[...] lengthy progressive epics [...] nothing short of stunning. [...] If you love 70s prog with an eye for Jethro Tull, Genesis and the Pop leanings of Greg Lake, the 80s update the likes of IQ, Galahad or Twelfth Night provided, or even the more pointed stabs of Porcupine Tree, you'll find them all here. As you will a slice of Prog Metal technicality and hefty helping of intrinsically British NWOBHM fret fury – and obviously the storytelling of War Of The Worlds. [...] an album that genuinely deserves to be given the accolade of current and future classic. Conceptual, progressive rock, genuinely doesn't get better than this."

== Track listing ==
All songs written and composed by Dean Marsh, except where noted. All Lead vocals by Dean Marsh, except where noted.

Disc One - Act I: The Day the Great Cog Failed
No.	Title	Writer(s)	Lead vocals	Length
1.	"The Traveller and the Lighter"			4:13
2.	"Shadowborn"		Hollick	6:51
3.	"The Unminable Zone"			2:32
4.	"The Lamplighter (Parts I-VIII)"		Marsh, Hollick	15:57
5.	"In the Cavern of the Great Cog"			3:52
6.	"The Great Cog"	Marsh, Hepe		5:15
7.	"The Shadow Rises..."			5:52
8.	"The Capture (Including the Song for a Fallen Nightkeeper)"	Marsh, Severn	Severn, Marsh	6:51
9.	"Waiting for Exile"			7:05
10.	"Eve's Song"		Hollick	8:27
Total length:				66:55

Disc Two - Act II: Of Men and Worms
No.	Title	Writer(s)	Lead vocals	Length
1.	"A Sermon for Shadowmas"			1:18
2.	"Victims of the Light"		Oberlé, Marsh	9:10
3.	"Old Friends, new Enemies"			4:23
4.	"Ditchwater Daisies"		Marsh, Hollick	7:22
5.	"De-ranged"			3:30
6.	"The Lamplighter (Parts IX-XIII)"	Marsh, Hepe, Severn	Lucassen, Hollick, Severn	12:13
7.	"In the Name of the Spy"			2:56
8.	"The Bewildering Conscience of a Clockwork Child"			10:20
9.	"Escape!"			3:25
10.	"A Solemn Toast for the Steam Ranger Reborn"		Marsh, Oberlé	10:38
Total length:				65:15

Disc Three - Act III: From Burrows We Came
No.	Title	Lead vocals	Length
1.	"The Oldest Flame"		1:58
2.	"The Lamplighter (Parts XIV-XV)"		2:58
3.	"Flight for the Surface"		2:10
4.	"The Climb"	Marsh, Hollick	12:24
5.	"At the Summit"		8:05
6.	"Fight for the Light"	Marsh, Dying Seed	8:08
7.	"Quest for Power"		1:12
8.	"At the Sign of the Aperture"	Bayley	12:33
9.	"A Machine serves his purpose"		1:30
10.	"The Clockwork Fable"		5:13
11.	"Escape from Cogtopolis"		1:14
12.	"Through the Lens"	Hollick	3:25
13.	"Epilogue - Oh Bugger!"		1:02
Total length:			61:52

== The Cast ==
The Orchestra

- Dean Marsh – 6 and 12 String Electric Guitars, Synths, Mandolin, Octave Mandola, and Bass
- Luke Severn – Lead and Backing Vocals
- Stefan Hepe – Drums, Percussion
- Christopher Ewen – Bass Guitar

with

- Matt Stevens – Ambient Guitars
- Dave Oberlé - Bodhran and Tan-Tan
- Nathan Madsen - Saxophone

The Choir

- Dean Marsh - sung words of "The Good People of Cogtopolis"
- Luke Severn - sung words of "The Nightkeepers"
- Arjen Lucassen - sung words of "Armistead"
- Blaze Bayley - sung words of "The Primarch"
- Dave Oberlé - sung words of "Pastor Simon"
- Melissa Hollick - sung words of "Eve"
- Dying Seed - background chants

Voice Actors

- Mark Benton - as "The Lamplighter/Prison Guard/First Secretary"
- Zach Galligan - as "The Steam Ranger"
- Tim Munro - as "The Tinker"
- Alicia Marsh - as "Eve"
- Paul Kavanagh - as "Pastor Simon"
- Bill Fellows - as "Armistead/Nightkeeper Spy"
- Paul Barnhill - as "The Primarch/Nightkeeper Breathren"
- Christopher Ewen - as "The Boy"
- Luke Severn - as "Second Secretary/another Nightkeeper Brethren"
- You, The Listener - as "The Traveler"
