= Gremlins (Atari 5200 video game) =

1986 video game

- Atari 5200 box art
- Developer: Atari Inc.
- Publisher: Atari Corp.
- Designer: John Seghers
- Artist: Courtney Granner
- Composer: Robert Vieira
- Series: Gremlins
- Platforms: Atari 5200, Commodore 64, IBM PC, Apple II
- Release: 1986
- Genre: Action
- Modes: Single-player, multiplayer

Gremlins is a 1986 top-down action video game based on the film Gremlins released for the Atari 5200. It was originally developed by Atari Inc. in 1984, but very shortly after the game was sent to manufacturers, Atari was sold to Jack Tramiel. Tramiel's new company, Atari Corp, did not release the game commercially until 1986. It is one of the last games released for the Atari 5200, along with Ballblazer and Rescue on Fractalus. It was designed and programmed by John Seghers. It was also published by Atarisoft for the Commodore 64, IBM PC and Apple II.

Players control Billy Peltzer who must contain innocent Mogwai in their pen over the course of a night while slaying Gremlins with a sword. Mogwai split on coming into contact with water and turn into Gremlins on contact with food. Another game called Gremlins was developed for the Atari 2600 within the same time period, but shares none of the same gameplay. Critics consider it to be a highlight of the Atari 5200 and significantly more faithful to the original movie than the Atari 2600 version, both in gameplay and comedic tone.

== Gameplay ==
The twelfth level featuring Billy, short Mogwai, tall Gremlins, scattered food, puddles of water, and furniture.

Gremlins is a top-down action game in which players control Billy Peltzer who brings the friendly Mogwai to their pen one by one before they can transform into the malevolent Gremlins. Mogwai turn into Gremlins on contact with food and both Mogwai and Gremlins split in two on contact with water. If a Gremlin manages to reach the pen, it can release all the captured Mogwai forcing Billy to start over. Billy has a sword which he can use to destroy attacking Gremlins. Each level takes place over the course of one night. Billy must return all of the Mogwai and vanquish all of the Gremlins before 6:00 AM. There are 25 levels in total. Each level contains additional distractions and obstacles, including television sets, popcorn poppers, refrigerators, and walls.

== Development ==
The movie Gremlins, directed by Joe Dante and produced by Steven Spielberg, debuted in U.S. theaters on June 8, 1984. Warner Bros., a part of Warner Communications who also owned Atari Inc, looked for merchandising opportunities to promote the film. Atari announced Gremlins for the Atari 5200, Atari 8-bit computers, and Atari 2600 at Summer CES in June 1984. They also simultaneously announced versions for the Commodore 64, Apple IIe, and IBM PC published under the Atarisoft label. Less than a month later, Warner Communications sold Atari Inc. to former Commodore president Jack Tramiel forming Atari Corp, a fallout from the video game crash of 1983. The 5200 version was completed and sent to manufacturers one day before the acquisition. Tramiel quickly halted all operations around the Atari 5200, which had already been discontinued in May.

Once cartridges arrived, they were warehoused with no plans for release. Spielberg heard about the situation and offered to buy the stock, but Tramiel declined the deal. It was finally cleared from warehouses and released onto the market in 1986 with no marketing or promotion, along with 5200 versions of Ballblazer and Rescue on Fractalus! which received similar fates. It is considered to be the last official game released for the Atari 5200. Credits on the back of the box attribute game design and programming to John Seghers, animation to Courtney Granner, and sound to Robert Vieira.

It was also released for the IBM PC, Commodore 64, and Apple IIe home computers. Gremlins for the Atari 2600, which released in 1984 before the Tramiel acquisition, is based on the same film but features entirely different gameplay. In 1985, an unrelated adventure game based on the film titled Gremlins: The Adventure was released in the United Kingdom by Adventure International.

== Reception ==
Tracie Forman in Electronic Games said it "has all the thrills, chills, and offbeat sense of humor that kept the lines so long at the box office." Forman appreciated the humor in the Mogwais and Gremlins being distracted by the television and turning popcorn machines on by themselves, and thought the action, graphics, and music to be excellent. TheGamer placed Gremlins in ninth place in its ranking of best Atari 5200 games, saying "it's a fun concept and one of the few licensed video games that isn't regarded as a dumpster fire." Retro Gamer said "there's nothing original in the gameplay, but the flawless execution and first rate graphics which make this well worth your time." Satirist Seanbaby in Electronic Gaming Monthly said it was more faithful to the movie than the Atari 2600 version but ripped into the manual for including the pun, "As the game opens things look really grim—or is that grem?" According to Brett Weiss, it is "fast, fun, and frantic" and "an essential part of the Atari 5200 library."
