= Dave Oberlé =

English musician (born 1953)

Dave Oberlé (born 9 January 1953 in Farnborough, Kent, England) is an English musician, best known as percussionist and lead vocalist with the 1970s band Gryphon. After the band split up in 1977, Oberlé went on to help launch the heavy rock magazine Kerrang!. He now spends his time with the newly re-formed Gryphon who have completed a new album entitled, ReInvention, and toured during 2018/9. He is also a Director of Small Blue, a computer software company.

In 2014, it was also announced that Oberlé would make a return to progressive rock, as one of the guest vocalists on A Forest of Fey by UK outfit Gandalf's Fist.

In 2016, Gandalf's Fist announced that Oberlé would contribute to their next album The Clockwork Fable.

== Discography ==
=== With Gryphon ===
- see Gryphon.

=== With Gandalf's Fist ===
- A Forest Of Fey (2014)
- The Clockwork Fable (2016)

=== With Martin Orford ===
- The Old Road (2008)
