= The Clockwork Prologue =

Studio album by Gandalf's Fist
- Released: 1 July 2019
- Recorded: 2018, 2019
- Studio: Lamplighter Studios, Patchwork Studios, Friggin'-Hot-Attic Studios, Appleyard Studios, Notes Studios
- Genre: Progressive rock
- Length: 1:37:11
- Label: Independent
- Producer: Dean Marsh

Gandalf's Fist chronology
The Clockwork Fable (2016)	The Clockwork Prologue (2019)	Widdershins (2022)

The Clockwork Prologue is the seventh studio album by the English progressive rock band Gandalf's Fist. Released on 1 July 2019, it is a two disc spanning rock-opera interspersed with a professionally acted radio play between the actual songs. The album is a two-part "Expansion Pack" to their previous album, The Clockwork Fable, featuring an expanded set of the original cast and performers, and providing more characters and storylines alongside the original story.

== Reception ==
Professional ratings
Review scores
Source	Rating
DPRP	9/10 stars
Sea of Tranquility	4/5 stars

Sea of Tranquility's Steven Reid wrote "[...] none of this would matter if the music wasn’t up to snuff, but whether encountering the languid surge of "The Waxwork Downs", the grandiose Uriah Heep meets Iron Maiden styled "Leader of Men", the more Saracen-like "Wardens" or the glorious folk prog workout that is "Supplies for the Festivities", there's not a cog that isn't turning perfectly."

The Progressive Aspect's Tony Colvill writes "[...] Every now and then the lunatics have an away day from the asylum; the Gandalf's Fist collective are such a bunch of lunatics. The Prologue is really a tale within a tale, that fits somewhere, though where is a complete mystery to me. [...] In adding to the Cogtopolis storyline, it builds a little flesh on the original story, and what was an epic listen evolves into a saga. [...] The album fits as a tale within; overacting barkingly joyously wonderful. Gandalf's Fist have delivered again. It completes the Fable, and I really look forward to the next tale, even if the subject may change. [...]"

== Track listing ==
All songs written and composed by Dean Marsh.

Disc One - Part I: The Thaw
No.	Title	Length
1.	"The Belly of the Earth"	0:58
2.	"An Expedition Amidst the Ice Burrows"	1:22
3.	"Wardens"	4:32
4.	"Badgerwhacked"	2:03
5.	"Solar Huntress"	6:43
6.	"Dirty Doyle's Surface Souvenirs"	1:35
7.	"Supplies for the Festivities"	5:33
8.	"Secrets, Traitors and a Smashing Set of Porcelain Ducks on Layby"	1:48
9.	"Blackening"	8:46
10.	"Hall of the Badger King"	3:55
Total length:		37.15

Disc Two - Part II: The Pieces of Our Time
No.	Title	Length
1.	"Sun Sickness"	1:58
2.	"Menders of Devices"	6:14
3.	"The Clokkemaker"	12:52
4.	"A Shortcut Across a Deranged Steam Conveyor"	2:13
5.	"The Waxwork Downs"	4:27
6.	"The Sovereign Airship Station"	5:16
7.	"Leader of Men"	8:08
8.	"Wheels in Motion"	3:12
9.	"The Lamplighter (Overture)"	15:36
Total length:		59.56

== The Cast ==
The cast list is taken from the liner notes, with further background to the characters they play also available.

The Orchestra

- Dean Marsh – 6 and 12 String Electric Guitars, Synths, Mandolin, Octave Mandola, Bass
- Ben Bell - Piano, Hammond Organ, Synths, Fretless Bass, Nashville Guitar
- Stefan Hepe – Drums, Percussion
- Christopher Ewen – Bass Guitar
- Luke Severn – Tubular Bells, Goose Flute

with

- William Stewart - Violins

The Choir

- Keri Farish - sung words of "The Clokkemaker" and her all-seeing spyglasses.
- Dean Marsh - sung words of "The Good People of Cogtopolis"
- Luke Severn - sung words of "The Nightkeepers"
- Ben Bell - the Choir of Doom

with

- Melissa Hollick - sung words of "Eve"

Voice Actors

- Mark Benton - as "King Dahks/City Announcer/City Official and distant expulsions of the Lamplighter"
- Tim Munro - as "The Tinker"
- Alicia Marsh - as "Eve"
- Bill Fellows - as "Dirty Doyle/Irontooth/Nightkeeper Spy"
- Paul Kavanagh - as "The Primarch"
- Keri Farish - as "The Clokkemaker/Washer Ethel"
- Christopher Ewen - as "The Boy"
- Ben Bell - as "the deranged Steam-Conveyor"
- Rafferty Marsh - as "an urchin at the weasel pie stall"

with

- You, The Listener - as "The Traveler"
