= Zach Galligan =

American actor

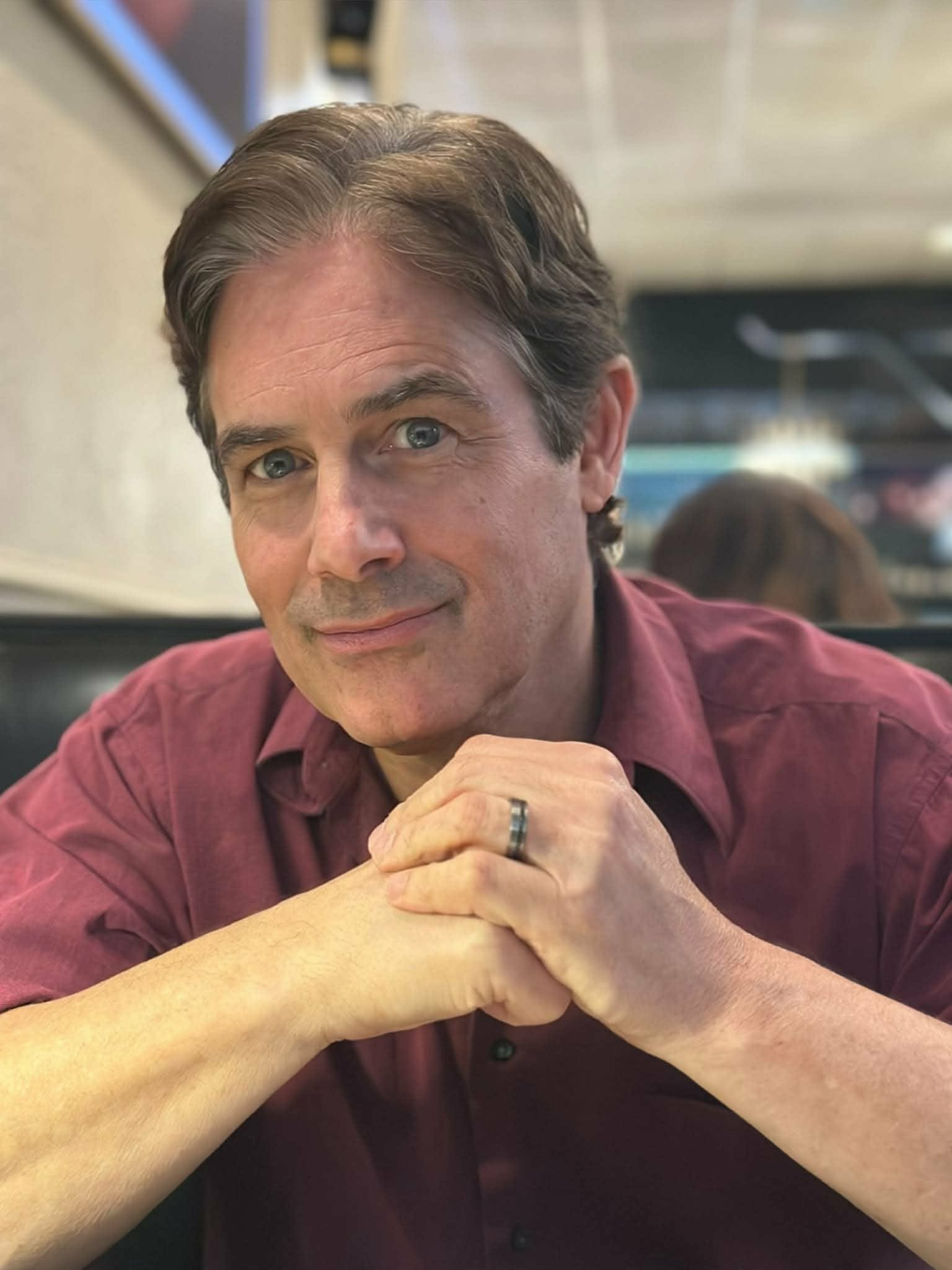
- Galligan in 2025
- Born: Zachary Wolfe Galligan; February 14, 1964 (age 62); New York City, U.S.
- Education: Columbia University
- Occupation: Actor
- Years active: 1984–present
- Spouse: Alison Marie Rieger (m. 2025) Ling-Ling Hu Ingerick (m. 2005; div. 2010)

Zachary Wolfe Galligan (born February 14, 1964) is an American actor. He is best known for starring as Billy Peltzer in the comedy-horror films Gremlins (1984) and Gremlins 2: The New Batch (1990).

== Early life and education ==
Galligan was born on February 14, 1964, in New York City, the son of Carol Jean (née Wolfe), a psychologist, and Arthur John Galligan, a lawyer who was a founding partner of the law firm of Dickstein Shapiro. He is mostly of Irish descent, although he also has some English and Jewish ancestry (from Austria) on his mother’s side. He graduated from Columbia University.

== Career ==
Galligan's most prominent role was as Billy Peltzer in the 1984 film Gremlins. Prior to being cast in Gremlins, he filmed Nothing Lasts Forever, which had its theatrical release cancelled and went unreleased in any form for years. In 1988, he starred as Mark Loftmore in the horror comedy Waxwork. He reprised his role as Billy in the 1990 sequel Gremlins 2: The New Batch, and returned to the role of Mark for Waxwork II: Lost in Time in 1992.

In 2016, UK progressive rock band Gandalf's Fist announced that Galligan would voice a character on their album The Clockwork Fable.

In early 2021, Galligan appeared in a Mountain Dew commercial in which his Gremlins character, Billy, gives Gizmo a drink of his Mountain Dew. Galligan returned to the Gremlins franchise again in 2022, in the animated series Gremlins: Secrets of the Mogwai.

== Personal life ==
In 2025 Zach Galligan married Alison Marie Rieger in a private ceremony.

== Filmography ==
=== Film ===
Year	Film	Role	Notes
1984	Gremlins	Billy Peltzer	
1984	Nothing Lasts Forever	Adam Beckett	
1988	Waxwork	Mark Loftmore	
1990	Gremlins 2: The New Batch	Billy Peltzer	
1990	Mortal Passions	Todd	
1991	Zandalee	Rog	
1991	Psychic	Patrick Costello	
1992	Round Trip To Heaven	Steve	
1992	Waxwork II: Lost in Time	Mark Loftmore	
1993	Warlock: The Armageddon	Douglas	
1993	All Tied Up	Brian Hartley	
1994	Caroline at Midnight	Jerry Hiatt	
1994	Ice	Rick Corbit	
1995	Cyborg 3: The Recycler	Evans	
1997	Cupid	Eric Rhodes	
1997	Prince Valiant	Sir Kay	
1997	The First to Go	Adam Curtis	
1998	Storm Trooper	Kreigal	
1999	The Storytellers	Greer Sandler	
2000	Little Insects	King Foptop	
2000	Raw Nerve	Ethan Lang	released in Japan as Random Shots
2000	G-Men from Hell	Dalton	
2001	The Tomorrow Man	Spence	
2001	Gabriela	Pat	
2001	Point Doom	Spider	
2001	What They Wanted, What They Got	Pete Drake	
2002	Infested	Warren	
2003	Momentum	Director Hammond	
2005	Legion of the Dead	Dr. Swatek	
2007	Let Them Chirp Awhile	Hart Carlton	
2008	Jewslim	Yoseph Caldwell	
2009	The Pack	Anson	
2009	Nightbeasts	Charles Thomas	
2010	Cut	Jack	
2010	Jack Falls	American Guy	
2013	Hatchet III	Sheriff Fowler	
2016	The Chair	Riley	
2017	Kampout	Detective Benson	
2019	Madness in the Method	Director/Zach	

=== Television ===
Year	Film	Role	Notes
1983	Jacobo Timerman: Prisoner Without a Name, Cell Without a Number	Héctor Timerman	Television movie
1985	Surviving: A Family in Crisis	Rick Brogan	Television movie
1987–1989	The Lawrenceville Stories	William "Hickey" Hicks	TV Mini-Series, All 3 Episodes
1992	Melrose Place	Rick Danworth	Episode: "For Love or Money"
1992	Tales from the Crypt	David and Rick	Episode: "Strung Along"
1993	For Love and Glory	Thomas Doyle	Unsold television pilot
1995	Extreme	Dan	Episode: Pilot
1996	Pacific Blue	Ron Jeffries	Episode: "Takedown"
1997	Dr. Quinn, Medicine Woman	Chester Barnes	Episode: "Homecoming"
1998	Love Boat: The Next Wave	Bill Chase	Episode: "Reunion"
1998	Star Trek: Voyager	Ensign David Gentry	Episode: "In the Flesh"
1998	The Net	Aaron Mitchelson	Episode: "Diamonds Aren't Forever"
1999	Chicken Soup for the Soul	Young Man	Episode: "My Convertible"
1999	Arthur's Quest	King Pendragon	Television film
2001	7th Heaven	Dr. Kent	Episode: "Worked"
2003	Law & Order: Criminal Intent	Eddie Malloy	Episode: "Happy Family"
2018	The Keith & Paddy Picture Show	as himself	Episode: "Gremlins"
2023	Gremlins: Secrets of the Mogwai	Henchman #2	Recurring cast

=== Web ===
Year	Title	Role	Notes	Source
2020	Chilling Tales for Dark Nights	Fitzroy / Narrator	Episode: "The End is Near"; Segment: "Mr. Promises"	
2021	The Irate Gamer	Himself	Episode: "Gremlins"	
2022	The Kill Count	Himself	Episode: "Gremlins 2 (1990) KILL COUNT"	
