= Gremlins, Inc. =

2016 video game

- Developers: Alexey Bokulev; Charlie Oscar
- Publisher: Yukitama Creative Industries
- Engine: Unity
- Platforms: Windows, Linux, OS X
- Release: WW: March 11, 2016
- Genre: Turn-based strategy
- Mode: Co-op mode; multiplayer; single-player

Gremlins, Inc. is a digital turn-based strategy board game developed by Lithuanian indie game studio Charlie Oscar, set in the steampunk world of gremlins, initially released on Steam Early Access on October 22, 2015 for Windows, Mac OS, and Linux. The game transitioned into full release on Steam on March 11, 2016. The game is designed by Alexey Bokulev, who previously designed another turn-based strategy video game, Eador: Genesis, and is produced by Sergei Klimov.
