= Gremlin Social =

Web-based social media tool

- Company type: Private
- Website type: Social media marketing
- Available in: Multilingual
- Founded: St. Louis, Missouri, 2009
- Headquarters: 1006 Olive St. Suite 303; USA
- Area served: Worldwide
- Founder: Ryan Bell
- Key people: Douglas Wilber (CEO), Josh Dennis (CTO)
- Industry: Internet
- Launched: December 2008; 17 years ago
- Current status: Active

Gremlin Social is a web-based social media tool. Founded by Ryan Bell in 2008, Gremlin Social combines social media marketing with compliance and reporting tools for use by banks and financial institutions. Originally named Gremlin, the company rebranded to Gremlin Social in September 2016.

Based in St. Louis, Gremlin Social operates on an enterprise subscription model and has over 100,000 users nationwide. Gremlin Social is privately held and its investors include Cultivation Capital and SixThirty, a FinTech accelerator.

== History ==
Founder Ryan Bell released the company’s first social media management software in 2008, a Twitter scheduling and management client called Twaitter. The success of Twaitter led Bell to design a multiple network management tool, initially called Gremln. The company spun out of Twaitter after local entrepreneur Hal Gentry raised financing for the company. Other capital came from Capital Innovators, Missouri Technology Corp, a public-private partnership, and private angel investors. In April 2014, Gremln was chosen to participate in the St. Louis-based financial services business accelerator, SixThirty.

In January 2014, the New York Bankers Association endorsed Gremln as the recommended social media management and compliance toolkit for all NYBA-member financial institutions. In November 2014, the company secured additional investment from St. Louis-based Cultivation Capital. Other investors include Capital Innovators, Missouri Technology Corp, a public-private partnership, and private angel investors. In May 2014, Gremln presented at the Finovate technology conference, and made a second appearance at Finovate Fall in September 2014.

Chris Moloney, a former executive with Wells Fargo Advisors, joined Gremln as CEO in September 2015. Founder Ryan Bell remained on as chairman and Chief Product Officer and Chief Technology Officer. One month after Moloney joined the team, Gremlin Social was endorsed by the American Bankers Association – through its subsidiary the Corporation for American Banking, for social media marketing, monitoring, and compliance.

In August 2016, Hal Gentry a software entrepreneur and investor and board member at Gremln, replaced Moloney as Interim CEO in August 2016. The company rebranded as Gremlin Social in September 2016.

In September 2018 Gremlin Social expanded its product offering through the acquisition of VidVerify and Insight CRM.

== Business and service ==
Gremlin Social offers organizational tools to manage social media marketing campaigns for individuals and groups, providing integration for profiles and posting to Twitter, Facebook, and LinkedIn. Its Social Guardian tool is designed for banks and financial services companies to manage a secure social media presence. Gremlin Social allows businesses to manage LinkedIn, Facebook, and Twitter profiles, monitor social media team activities, and filter sensitive keywords to help ensure security and compliance in their social media. As of January 2016, the service has over 100,000 users.

== Recognition ==
As Gremln, Gremlin Social received the St. Louis Business Journal 2015 Innovation Award, as well as the Leaders in Tech 2015 Small Business Monthly Leaders in Technology Award. Gremlin Social was named by PCWorld Magazine and CIO magazine as one of the "5 Top Applications for Business Users on Twitter" and won the Innovators Cup at the St. Louis Innovation Camp by sweeping all three categories: Most Viral, Most Innovative, and Most Potential. Gremlin Social was also a finalist in the 2011 Shorty Awards.
