= Gryphon (band) =

English progressive and medieval folk band

- Origin: London, England
- Genres: Progressive folk; medieval folk
- Years active: 1972–1977; 2009; 2015–present
- Labels: Transatlantic; EMI/Harvest; CURIO; Talking Elephant
- Members: Brian Gulland; Graeme Taylor; Dave Oberlé; Clare Taylor; Rob Levy; Andy Findon
- Past members: Richard Harvey; Philip Nestor; Malcolm (Bennett) Markovich; Jonathan Davie; Bob Foster; Alex Baird; Graham Preskett; Keith Thompson; Rory McFarlane
- Website: www.thegryphonpages.com/index.html

Gryphon are an English progressive folk band formed in London in 1972. They are known for their medieval and Renaissance style of music.

The band briefly flourished in the progressive rock heyday of the early 1970s, and then retired to other musical activities before reforming for a one-off reunion in 2009. Subsequently, Gryphon played some gigs in 2015, featured at the Cropredy Festival in 2016, and in 2017, an invitation to a ProgRock festival in Portugal, and in the UK, the NewDay Festival near Canterbury. The first new Gryphon record for 41 years was released in 2018.

== History ==
=== Formation ===
Gryphon formed in early 1972 as a four-piece band by English musicians Graeme Taylor, Richard Harvey, Dave Oberlé, and Brian Gulland. Harvey and Gulland were graduates of the Royal College of Music in London who started an acoustic band, using their classically trained backgrounds to perform a mixture of English folk music, contemporary rock, medieval and Renaissance music. The duo were joined by guitarist Graeme Taylor and drummer Dave Oberlé shortly after, thus becoming the first line-up of Gryphon. They soon signed a recording deal with the folk label Transatlantic Records and secured Nick Wright as their manager. The band's first live gig took place at the Stone Parish Church in Aylesbury, Buckinghamshire, promoted by the town's Friars venue. Their publicist Martin Lewis described their sound: "Imagine Henry VIII in a rock'n'roll band – think Gryphon."

=== First incarnation ===
In June 1973, Transatlantic released Gryphon's self-titled debut album, recorded in engineer Adam Skeaping's attic. It marked an early expansion to their sound with the addition of electric guitars, keyboards, and various wind instruments such as the bassoon and krumhorn that were featured little in rock music at the time. The group developed a live reputation in folk and rock clubs across the country; their early period included performances at Shakespeare celebrations at St. Paul's and Southwark Cathedrals. Gryphon received nationwide exposure soon after with features on all four BBC Radio stations within a five-day period. Later that year they composed for the documentary film Glastonbury Fayre (1972) and completed a European tour. By 1974, Gryphon acquired Phillip Nestor as their new bassist.

Gryphon recorded their second album, Midnight Mushrumps, in January 1974 at Chipping Norton Recording Studios, Oxfordshire. Its centrepiece is the 18-minute title track conceived by Harvey. Around the time of the album, Lewis arranged for the band to be commissioned to write and record music for stage production of Shakespeare's The Tempest at the National Theatre in London, directed by Peter Hall. It opened at The Old Vic in April 1974, the same month as the album's release. Gryphon's music for the play inspired the direction of Midnight Mushrumps named after a phrase mentioned in the play. Following the successful premiere of the play and acclaim for its music, Lewis arranged for Gryphon to perform at The Old Vic in July 1974, the first concert at the venue by a rock band.

A month following their success at The Old Vic, the band recorded their third album, Red Queen to Gryphon Three. The album marked a reduction in the use of non-standard instruments. By this time they had swapped Wright for a new manager, Brian Lane, who also managed Yes. Former Yes keyboardist Rick Wakeman, also a student at the Royal College of Music, had introduced the band to Lane and suggested they be signed to an American label. Released in December 1974, the album was their first released in the US, through Bell Records. Gryphon toured the album across the US, Canada, and the UK as the opening act for Yes between November 1974 and May 1975 (with bass guitarist/flute player Malcolm Bennett replacing Philip Nestor). The tour was a breakthrough for the group, performing in large venues and crowds nationwide and joining Yes on stage for some encores.

Following Gryphon's fourth album, 1975's Raindance (which featured far more song material and David Oberlé beginning to concentrate on singing as well as drumming), Malcolm Bennett and Graeme Taylor both left the band and went on to form Precious Little, which Taylor hoped would be "a British beat combo with the improvisational freedom of The (Grateful) Dead." Taylor and Bennett were replaced on guitars and bass by Bob Foster and Jonathan Davie respectively, with Alex Baird recruited as kit drummer to allow Oberlé to focus fully on singing and lighter percussion. This lineup recorded a fifth, even more rock-oriented album, Treason, which was released on Harvest Records in 1977.

Gryphon split up later in 1977, after the release of Treason, due to the band members feeling that the band's momentum had been lost and that the advent of punk had sidelined their style of music. Another factor was that Richard Harvey's projects outside the band (in folk rock, sessions and soundtrack work) were developing further and beginning to require too much of his attention. In the same year, both Harvey and Jonathan Davie - under the names Rik Mansworth and John Thomas - were briefly members of the punk/new wave "scam" group The Banned.

=== Reunion ===
In September 2007, Gryphon announced on their website that they had finally decided to produce a new album after a silence of thirty-one years. A one-off performance occurred on 6 June 2009 at the Queen Elizabeth Hall, London, thirty-two years after their last performance. The four original members - Richard Harvey, Brian Gulland, Graeme Taylor and Dave Oberlé - opened the evening with a selection of songs and instrumentals from the first album Gryphon. They were then joined by Jon Davie (the final bass player, who appeared on Treason) and a new member, the multi-instrumentalist and film/production music composer Graham Preskett for the rest of the evening.

A follow-up tour was postponed, but the band eventually played six dates in May 2015, with further dates in 2016 including Fairport Convention's Cropredy Convention and a return to Union Chapel Hall. Harvey left the group in early 2016, and shortly after they were joined by Keith Thompson on woodwinds and Rory McFarlane on bass. In September 2018, the band released a new studio album of original material entitled ReInvention, their first in 41 years. This was followed in November 2020 by a seventh studio album, Get Out Of My Father's Car!

== Musical style ==
The band's music is said to be "steeped in the medieval traditions of English folk music." According to Classic Rock Magazine: "This is renaissance rock taken to such an extreme that it makes Blackmore’s Night sound perfectly normal."

== Personnel ==
=== Band members ===
Current members

- Brian Gulland (born 30 April 1951) – bassoon, trombone, crumhorn, recorder, keyboards, vocals (1973–1977, 2009, 2015–present)
- Graeme Taylor – guitars, vocals, keyboards (1973–1975, 2009, 2015–present)
- Dave Oberlé – drums, percussion, lead vocals (1973–1977, 2009, 2015–present)
- Rob Levy – bass (2018–present)
- Andy Findon – flute, crumhorn, saxophone, clarinet, vocals (2017–present)
- Clare Taylor – violin, keyboards (2019–present)

=== Former members ===
- Richard Harvey – recorder, crumhorn, mandolin, keyboards, vocals (1973–1977, 2009, 2015–2016)
- Philip Nestor – bass, vocals (1974)
- Malcolm Bennett (known since 1989 as Malcolm Markovich) – bass, flute (1974–1975)
- Alex Baird – drums (1977)
- Jonathan Davie – bass (1975–1977, 2009, 2015)
- Bob Foster – guitar (1977)
- Graham Preskett – violin, keyboards, mandolin, guitar, harmonica, percussion (2009, 2015–2019)
- Keith Thompson – recorder, crumhorn, oboe (2016–2017)
- Rory McFarlane – bass (2016–2018?)

=== Additional personnel ===
- Ernest Hart – organ (on Midnight Mushrumps and Red Queen to Gryphon Three). This "credit" is spurious and actually refers to the fact that Ernest Hart of organmakers Copeman Hart made the electronic reed organ played by Richard Harvey on the albums.
- Peter Redding – acoustic bass (on Red Queen to Gryphon Three)
- Tim Sebastion – lyrics (on Treason)

== Discography ==
=== Studio albums ===
- Gryphon (1973)
- Midnight Mushrumps (1974)
- Red Queen to Gryphon Three (1974)
- Raindance (1975)
- Treason (1977)
- ReInvention (2018)
- Get Out Of My Father's Car! (2020)

=== Live ===
- A Sonic Tonic: Live 2023 (2024)

=== Singles ===
- "Spring Song" / "The Fall of the Leaf" (UK, 1977)

=== Compilations and other releases ===
- The Collection (1991)
- The Collection II (1995)
- About as Curious as It Can Be (2002; BBC Radio sessions from 1974 and 1975)
- Glastonbury Carol (2003; BBC Radio sessions from 1972 and 1974 BBC Radio session performances plus theme music for the Peter Neal film Glastonbury Fayre)
- Crossing the Styles: The Transatlantic Anthology (2004)
- Raindances: The Transatlantic Years Recordings (1973-1975) (2018)
