= MultiVersus =

2024 video game

- Key artwork
- Developer: Player First Games
- Publisher: Warner Bros. Games
- Director: Tony Huynh
- Composers: Stephen Barton; Gordy Haab; Kevin Notar; Edouard Brenneisen; Marco Valerio Antonini
- Engine: Unreal Engine 4 (open beta); Unreal Engine 5 (launch)
- Platforms: PlayStation 4; PlayStation 5; Windows; Xbox One; Xbox Series X/S
- Release: May 28, 2024
- Genre: Platform fighter
- Modes: Single-player, multiplayer

MultiVersus (MVS) is a 2024 fighting game developed by Player First Games and published by Warner Bros. Games. The crossover game features characters and stages from and inspired by Warner Bros. franchises, including the company's film series, Looney Tunes, Game of Thrones, the DC Universe, Scooby-Doo and Cartoon Network franchises. As a platform fighter, the game primarily revolves around dealing sufficient damage to opponents in order to force them beyond the stage's boundaries, with particular emphasis on cooperative play.

Officially announced in November 2021 following online rumors and leaks, early access and open beta versions of the game ran from July 2022 to June 2023. The game then re-entered development until it was officially released as a free-to-play title on May 28, 2024, for PlayStation 4, PlayStation 5, Windows, Xbox One and Xbox Series X/S. New characters and stages were added until the beginning of Season 5 on January 31, 2025.

MultiVersus received mixed reviews and was a commercial failure, following a period of initial success. Its open beta received praise for its team-oriented gameplay, presentation and faithfulness to the represented franchises, with minor criticism for its microtransactions. The latter, alongside technical issues, became a more prominent point of criticism upon the game's full release, with critics opining that its monetization mechanics were aggressive, including time-limited cosmetics. MultiVersus was delisted and its servers were permanently closed on May 30, 2025, remaining playable through its offline modes.

== Gameplay ==
A trailer of MultiVersus's gameplay, featuring opposing teams (2v2) in 4 player matches

MultiVersus is a platform fighter, with players battling on different stages and attempting to knock the opponent beyond the stage's boundary by dealing sufficient damage. While 1-vs-1 and free-for-all options are available, the game emphasizes battling in teams of two characters; most attacks in the game are designed with this in mind, including other players passively strengthening the move's effect. The game initially launched without a ranked queue nor free-for-all, which was present in the open beta. Free-for-all was readded in a post-launch season 1 update, and ranked was readded with season 2. Season 3 added a "casual queue" mode, similar to the "Co-Op vs. AI" mode from the open beta, "Wacky Weekends", where the aforementioned Rift mutators are applied to PvP, and "Testing Grounds", where new gameplay mechanics, like shields, are trialed for addition in future updates. Season 4 added an Arena game mode, which is a 2v2 mode that pits players against each other and AI. In Arena, players will be locked to one of eight randomly-selected characters may invest in "upgrades" that give themselves buffs.

MultiVersus features a perk system, which allows players to customize their characters with passive abilities that will also affect their partners in Teams. These include Signature Perks, which are exclusive to a respective character and directly affect their attributes and abilities. In the open beta, perks' effects were enhanced if players on the same team both equipped them; in the final release, only select perks have this effect.

While MultiVersus is primarily a PvP game, its full release saw the introduction of the Rifts PvE game mode. Rifts each have their own narrative and consist of nodes with different mutators that affect gameplay. Most nodes are composed of battles and conclude with a boss fight, but some nodes will offer different types of gameplay. Players can equip Gems, which can be levelled up either through gameplay or through Gleamium. Gems have three different types: Defense, Attack and Utility, and they will only activate if the Rift's theme matches that of the currently-selected Gems. Completing nodes will grant rewards to the party, with an additional reward unlocked depending on how much stars were earned throughout.

=== Currencies and Battle Pass ===
MultiVersus features four currencies: Perk Currency, which is used to buy perks; Gleamium, a premium currency that can be used to buy variants, taunts, banners, profile icons, ringout effects, announcer packs and premium battle passes in addition to characters; Prestige, which is used to buy items in the Prestige Store; and Toasts, used to congratulate other players. Previously, Fighter Currency and Gold were obtainable currencies before being superseded.

Before season four, characters could be unlocked by obtaining Fighter Currency. It was obtainable by playing the game; they are frequently obtained from mission objectives, special events, rift levels, given out as daily login rewards, obtained in both versions of the battlepass, being "toasted", and earned by leveling up characters and the player's profile. Following season four, it was superseded with the "Fighter Road" system, which allows players to grind experience to unlock characters, while remaining Fighter Currency will be kept in players' inventory until consumed. Perk Currency is also obtained by playing the game and can only be used to unlock character Perks.

Gleamium is far rarer to find via gameplay but is purchasable with real-world currencies, and completing the battle pass rewards enough for the following season's pass. Gleamium can still be obtained for free from the free battle pass, leveling up a character to level 15, rewards from certain events, and logging in during specific days. Prestige points are obtained by collecting cosmetic items and can be used to purchase exclusive items from the Prestige Store.

The Gold currency was present in the open beta and could be obtained while playing the game through various means. During certain events, specific tokens or currencies were earned by playing in any mode and playing with specific character variants doubles the amount. These currencies were then used to purchase cosmetic items or, during certain events, traded for Gold, with 10 Gold for every 500 units of a specific token. All unused Gold after the open beta ended was converted into Perk Currency. Fighter Currency, which was used to purchase characters, was used in the first three seasons of the full launch. It was retired with season four and replaced with the aforementioned "Fighter Road".

The Battle Pass contains two tiers: Normal, which is free for all players; and Premium, which requires Gleamium to purchase. In both tiers, players earn points by completing daily and seasonal missions. Obtainable items include currencies, characters (up until season three), gem boosters, in-game cosmetics like variants and taunts, and profile cosmetics such as icons and banners. Progress in both tiers is tied; if the Premium tier is purchased after progress is made on the Normal tier, all rewards will retroactively be obtained. Individual tiers can be purchased with Gleamium. The highest battle pass level with an obtainable item is level 70, where players unlock a unique variant for the character that launched alongside it. Levels 71 and later grant players a random currency. Season four introduces a change to battle passes: with characters being unlocked through "Fighter Road", characters are no longer given as part of the battle pass, and two passes will be made available throughout the season. Levels are now capped at 45, with level 46 onward rewarding a random currency.

Toasts are obtainable through Gleamium, logging in, daily missions, the in-game store, or by getting "toasted". Toasting other players will give them 5 Fighter Road XP (previously Gold in the open beta and Fighter Currency before Season 4).

== Playable characters ==
MultiVersus launched with 26 playable characters, with the beta starting with 17 characters and an additional nine added leading up to the official release. Nine further characters were added between the game's official release and shutdown, bringing the total to 35. Most of the playable characters originate from Warner Bros. franchises; Reindog is original to the game, while LeBron James's appearance is based on his portrayal in Space Jam: A New Legacy. Voice acting is prominently emphasized, and several voice actors reprise their respective roles from other media. Character movesets are inspired by their common traits that are depicted in their respective universe of origin. Characters can be any one of four classes—Assassin, Bruiser, Mage/Ranged and Tank—and are best suited for covering a specific direction, these being horizontal or vertical; characters classified as hybrid are able to cover both directions. A fifth class, Support, was present only in the open beta.

Every character has at least one playable variant, some of which have different voice actors or dialogue from the default variant. Characters can be unlocked through gameplay, or purchased using Gleamium, Fighter Currency, or Character Tickets included with the Founder's Pack content packages; four specific characters are also playable for all users on a rotating basis.

Overview of characters in MultiVersus
Phase	Character	Franchise	Class
Season 1	Agent Smith	The Matrix	Bruiser
Season 5	Aquaman	DC Universe	Tank
Alpha	Arya Stark	Game of Thrones	Assassin
Season 1	Banana Guard	Adventure Time	Bruiser
Alpha	Batman (Note: Bruce Wayne is also playable as a character skin for Batman.)	DC Universe	Bruiser
Season 2	Betelgeuse (Note: Spelled Beetlejuice in-game prior to Season 4)	Beetlejuice	Assassin
Beta Season 1	Black Adam	DC Universe	Bruiser
Alpha	Bugs Bunny	Looney Tunes	Mage/Ranged
Alpha	Finn the Human (Note: Fern is also playable as a character skin for Finn.)	Adventure Time	Assassin
Alpha	Garnet	Steven Universe	Bruiser
Beta Season 1	Gizmo	Gremlins	Mage/Ranged
Alpha	Harley Quinn (Note: Dr. Quinzel is also playable as a character skin for Harley Quinn.)	DC Universe	Assassin
Beta	Iron Giant	The Iron Giant	Tank
Alpha	Jake the Dog (Note: Cake the Cat is also playable as a character skin for Jake.)	Adventure Time	Bruiser
Season 1	Jason Voorhees (Note: Uber Jason and appearances based on Jason Goes to Hell: The Final Friday and Freddy vs. Jason is also playable as a character skin for Jason.)	Friday the 13th	Tank
Beta	LeBron James	Space Jam: A New Legacy	Bruiser
Season 5	Lola Bunny	Looney Tunes	Bruiser
Season 4	Marceline the Vampire Queen	Adventure Time	Bruiser
Beta Season 2	Marvin the Martian (Note: Martian Commander X-2 (Duck Dodgers) is also playable as a character skin for Marvin.)	Looney Tunes	Mage/Ranged
Beta Season 1	Morty Smith (Note: Evil Morty is also playable as a character skin for Morty.)	Rick and Morty	Mage/Ranged
Season 3	Nubia	DC Universe	Assassin
Season 4	Raven	DC Universe	Mage/Ranged
Alpha	Reindog	Player First Games	Mage/Ranged
Beta Season 1	Rick Sanchez (Note: Rick Prime is also playable as a character skin for Rick.)	Rick and Morty	Mage/Ranged
Season 2	Samurai Jack (Note: Mad Jack is also playable as a character skin for Samurai Jack.)	Samurai Jack	Bruiser
Alpha	Shaggy Rogers (Note: Uncle Shagworthy is also playable as a character skin for Shaggy.)	Scooby-Doo	Bruiser
Alpha	Steven Universe	Steven Universe	Tank
Beta Season 1	Stripe (Note: Brain Gremlin is also playable as a character skin for Stripe.)	Gremlins	Assassin
Alpha	Superman (Note: Clark Kent is also playable as a character skin for Superman.)	DC Universe	Tank
Alpha	Taz (Note: Tasmanian She-Devil is also playable as a character skin for Taz.)	Looney Tunes	Assassin
Season 1	The Joker (Note: The Batman Who Laughs is also playable as a character skin for The Joker.)	DC Universe	Mage/Ranged
Season 3	The Powerpuff Girls (Note: The Rowdyruff Boys are also playable as a character skin for The Powerpuff Girls.)	The Powerpuff Girls	Assassin
Alpha	Tom & Jerry	Tom and Jerry	Mage/Ranged
Alpha	Velma Dinkley	Scooby-Doo	Mage/Ranged
Alpha	Wonder Woman	DC Universe	Tank

== Development ==
The trailer for MultiVersus

MultiVersus was the only game developed by Player First Games (PFG), which was founded in 2019 and later acquired by Warner Bros. Games in July 2024. Dedicated servers, rollback netcode, and voice acting were promoted as prominent features, with new content and characters released via periodic updates. The game held a closed alpha test from February 25 to March 8, 2022.

=== Background ===
Prior to its announcement in November 2021, rumors of the game surfaced from multiple sources. Initially, a user on the subreddit r/GamingLeaksandRumours claimed that the game was in development as early as 2019 following the release of Super Smash Bros. Ultimate and Warner Bros.' acknowledgement of the Ultra Instinct Shaggy Internet meme. The user also claimed that the idea of a crossover influenced the filming of Space Jam: A New Legacy, although the validity of these claims is uncertain.

On October 27, 2021, professional Super Smash Bros. player Juan "Hungrybox" DeBiedma shared an image on Twitter showing what he alleged was the character selection screen for MultiVersus. The image was deleted after Warner Bros. submitted a DMCA takedown request, which DeBiedma stated was a "hard confirm" of the photograph's veracity. The image included Gandalf and Rick Sanchez as playable characters in place of Arya Stark and Garnet, and Superman and Steven Universe's designs were updated to be shown in the trailer. Jeff Grubb, a gaming insider, confirmed that LeBron James would feature in the game. Internal game design documents for the game were leaked on ResetEra. Following the tech test, gameplay footage was leaked online.

On May 26, 2022, a subsequent leak revealed additional playable characters, including Daenerys Targaryen and Ted Lasso.

=== Early access and open beta ===
An early access version was released on July 19 for participants of selected events, including the game's closed playtests and those competing in the game's first 2v2 tournament at the 2022 Evolution Championship Series, and via Twitch's Drops reward system and purchasable founder's packs. During the 2022 San Diego Comic-Con event, Rick Sanchez, Morty Smith and LeBron James were announced as playable characters. The open beta was released on July 26, 2022, serving as a soft launch for the game. Throughout the open beta, a Founder's Pack paid-DLC was sold through Steam, the Epic Games Store, the Microsoft Store, and the PlayStation Store. It was available in Standard, Deluxe, and Premium editions.

During the open beta, Bugs Bunny players held the number-one ranked slot in both 1-v-1 and 2-v-2 leaderboards. The character's prevalence among top-ranked 2-v-2 players was notable, leading to changes to Bugs' abilities and those of Wonder Woman implemented after EVO 2022. During and after the open beta, various characters' abilities have been frequently modified; notably, a police car featured in one of Velma Dinkley's abilities was replaced with the Mystery Machine.

MultiVersus's first season was originally scheduled to launch on August 9, 2022, but was delayed to August 15. The game's second and final season during open beta launched on November 15.

On March 27, 2023, it was announced that the open beta would end on June 25, and the game would go offline in preparation for a full launch on May 28, 2024. This was despite PFG's prior statement, which read, "MultiVersus hits Open Beta on July 26 and then we're here to stay." Offline functionality was retained during the downtime, but the game was made unobtainable for new players.

=== Full game launch ===
In March 2024, it was announced that MultiVersus would relaunch on May 28, 2024, for PlayStation 5, PlayStation 4, Xbox Series X/S, Xbox One, and PC via Steam and Epic Games Store. It featured full cross-play and cross-progression support, and included a new PvE game mode. For the full launch, Player First Games rebuilt the game in Unreal Engine 5 to support better netcode and visuals, however as a result of the switch many features that existed in the open beta went missing or were incomplete, with promises made for those to be re-implemented down the line. Such instances of missing features included ranked matchmaking, a free-for-all PvP mode, and post-match stats, all of which returned in post-launch updates.

=== End of support ===
On January 31, 2025, Warner Bros. Games announced that all further support for the game would be ending following the conclusion of Season 5, starting on February 4 and ending May 30. The ability to purchase premium currency was concurrently removed. Following the end of Season 5, the game was delisted from all digital storefronts and all online functionality ceased; however, those who previously downloaded the game are able to continue playing offline in local multiplayer and training modes "for the foreseeable future".

In February 2025, Warner Bros. Games announced the closure of Player First Games, alongside WB Games San Diego and Monolith Productions.

== Reception ==
Reception

Aggregate score
Aggregator	Score
Metacritic	(PC) 75/100 (PS5) 75/100 (XSXS) 75/100

Review scores
Publication	Score
Famitsu	32/40
Game Informer	8/10
GameSpot	8/10
Hardcore Gamer	4.5/5
IGN	8/10
PC Gamer (US)	78/100
PCMag	3/5
Push Square	8/10
Shacknews	7/10

The game received generally positive reviews during its open beta. IGN wrote "MultiVersus may not be a must-play at social gatherings, but its refreshing team-based battles make it a great platform fighter online." Play summarized that it was "full of love for the characters, and crunchy to play, you owe it to yourself to give this a go—though the monetisation methods are off-putting." In Japan, four critics from Famitsu gave the game a total score of 32 out of 40, with each critic awarding the game an 8 out of 10.

Its launch on Steam was the most successful for a WB Games title, and the biggest launch for a fighting game released on the platform.

The game topped the American sales charts for July 2022, falling to number 5 the following month. It was the most downloaded game on the US PlayStation Store for the same month, and number 2 in Europe. It also topped the sales charts in Australia. It was the most popular title on the Steam Deck platform.

By August 2022, the game reached 10 million players. By September, it reached 20 million. By February 2023, the game experienced a significant drop in daily players, which a Kotaku article attributed to a lack of updates and new characters. Trackers for the Steam version reported an average daily peak of roughly 1,300 players over the last 30 days, marking the title's lowest player count since launch. The announcement of the closure of the open beta surprised players who believed that the game was already fully released and had paid for premium content.

Of the re-release, Kotaku said that the "joy is propped up by a dumpster fire full of free-to-play, service gaming tropes, some so poorly thought out or predatory that it's shocking they made it out the gate at all". They concluded that "some forces behind these kinds of games are always ready to push the boundaries on monetization. It feels wrong, ethically, to participate in, and especially to recommend this game to others." The game was further criticized for how certain variants were released, as players were incentivized into purchasing them with real-world currencies and had limited options to obtain them in other ways.

In June 2024, the game again topped the free game download charts in North America and Europe. In November 2024, Warner Bros. Games stated that the game "significantly underperformed", contributing to a $100 million writedown.

Accolades for MultiVersus
Year	Award	Category	Result	Ref.
2022	Golden Joystick Awards	Best Multiplayer Game	Nominated	
2022	The Game Awards 2022	Best Multiplayer Game	Nominated	
2022	The Game Awards 2022	Best Fighting Game	Won	
2023	26th Annual D.I.C.E. Awards	Fighting Game of the Year	Won	
2024	The Game Awards 2024	Best Fighting Game	Nominated	
