= Grandpa Fred =

Grandpa Fred may refer to:

- Grandpa Fred, a character in Gremlins 2: The New Batch, portrayed by Robert Prosky, a parody of the Grandpa character in The Munsters.
- Grandpa Fred, a character in Sixteen Candles, portrayed by Max Showalter.
- Grandpa Fred, a puppet used by American ventriloquist David Strassman.
- Grandpa Fred, a character in Maybe It's Me.
