= Gremlins (Atari 2600 video game) =

1984 video game

- Cover art by Greg Winters
- Developer: Atari, Inc.
- Publishers: Atari, Inc.
- Designer: Scott Smith
- Artist: Mimi Nyden (animator)
- Composer: Robert Vieira
- Series: Gremlins
- Platform: Atari 2600
- Release: July 1984
- Genre: Action
- Modes: Single-player, multiplayer

Gremlins is a 1984 action video game based on the film of the same name, developed and published by Atari, Inc. for the Atari 2600. Atari released another, substantially different game based on the film, also titled Gremlins, for the Atari 5200. Gremlins is the last game developed by Atari Inc. for the Atari 2600 and the last game they published before their consumer division along with the Atari 2600 were sold to create Atari Corp.

== Gameplay ==
Gameplay

The 2600 game consists of two playable screens and can be played by one player or two players alternating turns. The first screen is similar to the 1981 game Kaboom!. The player controls protagonist Billy Peltzer, who runs side-to-side across the screen catching falling Mogwai to prevent them from eating hamburgers. In the second screen, similar to Space Invaders, the player moves Billy back and forth across the screen and shoots waves of descending gremlins.

== Development ==
Gremlins, directed by Joe Dante, was the center of a major merchandising push in the months surrounding its release. Atari developed video game tie-ins for both of its contemporary consoles, the Atari 2600 and the Atari 5200. The game was also the final game released for the 5200. Atari intended to release both along with the film in 1984, but the company stopped shipment of all its games after its reorganization that year. Atari first previewed the 2600 version of the game at the 1984 Consumer Electronics Show in Chicago. It was released in limited numbers later that year, and became moderately rare. Credits on the back of the box attribute game design and programming to Scott Smith, animation to Mimi Nyden, and sound to Robert Vieira.

This game and the Atari 5200 game use the same cover art created by Greg Winters featuring the characters of Gizmo and Stripe.

== Reception ==
In retrospective reviews, Brett Weiss called it "derivative" and lacking in originality, and humorist Seanbaby criticized the premise of defending hamburgers from gremlins, calling it a "clumsily rearranged Hamburglar game".
