= Gremlins: Secrets of the Mogwai =

2023 animated comedy fantasy television series

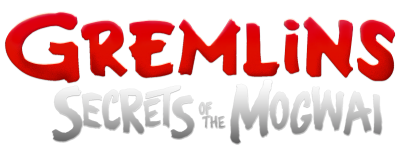
- Based on: Gremlins by Chris Columbus
- Developed by: Tze Chun
- Voices of: James Hong; Ming-Na Wen; B. D. Wong; Izaac Wang; Matthew Rhys; Gabrielle Nevaeh Green; A.J. LoCascio; Simu Liu; George Takei; Yael Grobglas
- Music by: Sherri Chung
- Country of origin: United States
- Original language: English
- No. of seasons: 2
- No. of episodes: 20

Production
- Executive producers: Steven Spielberg; Darryl Frank; Justin Falvey; Sam Register; Tze Chun; Brendan Hay
- Producer: Danielle Witz
- Running time: 22 minutes
- Production companies: Amblin Television; Warner Bros. Animation

Original release
- Network: Max
- Release: May 23, 2023 – April 10, 2025

Related
- Gremlins franchise

Gremlins: Secrets of the Mogwai is an American animated fantasy adventure horror comedy television series developed by Tze Chun. A prequel to the film Gremlins (1984), the series is set in 1920s Shanghai and tells the story of how 10-year-old Sam Wing met Gizmo, a young Mogwai. Steven Spielberg, Darryl Frank, Justin Falvey, Sam Register, and Brendan Hay serve as executive producers, with Gremlins director Joe Dante as consulting producer.

In February 2021, ahead of the series premiere, the series was renewed for a second season. The first episode had its world premiere at the Annecy International Animation Film Festival on June 13, 2022, before the series premiered with the launch of Max on May 23, 2023, consisting of 10 episodes. It was set to air on Cartoon Network as part of their "ACME Night" block, though the block moved to Adult Swim before that could happen.

The first half of the second season, subtitled The Wild Batch, was released on October 3, 2024. It shows how Sam and Gizmo move from Shanghai to America before Randall Peltzer discovers Gizmo. The second half was released on April 10, 2025.

== Premise ==
The series focuses on how 10-year-old Sam Wing met the young Mogwai called Gizmo. Along with a teenage street thief named Elle, Sam and Gizmo take a perilous journey through the Chinese countryside, encountering, and sometimes battling, colorful monsters and spirits from Chinese mythology and Chinese folklore. On their quest to return Gizmo to his family and uncover a legendary treasure, they are pursued by Riley Greene, a power-hungry industrialist and his growing army of evil Gremlins. The series also delves into the creation of the Mogwai by the goddess Nuwa and her brother, Fuxi. The second season takes place one year after the first season.

== Voice cast ==
=== Main cast ===
- Izaac Wang as Sam Wing
- Ming-Na Wen as Fong Wing, Yin
- B. D. Wong as Hon Wing
- James Hong as Grandpa Wing
- Matthew Rhys as Riley Greene
- A.J. LoCascio as Gizmo, Bucky, Clam, Snout Jr., Evil Mogwai
- Gabrielle Nevaeh Green as Elle-Marie
- George Takei as Noggin
- Simu Liu as Chang
- Yael Grobglas as Margot

=== Recurring cast ===
- Eric Bauza as Sebastian, Snout
- Dee Bradley Baker as Evil Mogwai, Lion
- Yvette Nicole Brown as Mayor Hansen
- Michael Paul Chan as The Lion
- Ronny Chieng as Big Big
- SungWon Cho as the Circusmaster, Kung Kung
- Peyton Crim as Jackalope
- Keith David as Bass Reeves
- Grey DeLisle as Claw, Duckface, Evil Mogwai
- Will Forte as the Warden of Alcatraz
- Zach Galligan as Henchman #2
- John Glover as Rodney
- Michael Greyeyes as Geronimo
- Alex Hernandez as Chupacabra
- Keisuke Hoashi as Wei
- Kelly Hu as The Lioness
- Haviland Morris as Theodora
- Laraine Newman as Lady Clamp
- Sandra Oh as Nüwa
- Timothy Olyphant as Johnny Appleseed
- Randall Park as Yao / Odd-Odd
- Bowen Yang as Celestial Administrator
- Julie Nathanson as Warbler
- Calvin Shen as Radish
- Robin Weigert as Calamity Jane
- Gary Anthony Williams as John Henry
- Jenn Wong as Jingwei
- Jimmy O. Yang as Little Big
- Keone Young as Fortune Telling Pigeon, Boss Chang
- Ramona Young as Fox Spirit
- Moujan Zolfahari as Lucky

== Series overview ==
Season	Subtitle	Episodes	Originally released	
Season	Subtitle	Episodes	First released	Last released
1	Secrets of the Mogwai	10	May 23, 2023	June 22, 2023
2	The Wild Batch	10	October 3, 2024	April 10, 2025

== Episodes ==
=== Season 1 (2023) ===
No. overall	No. in season	Title	Directed by	Written by	Original release date
1	1	"Never Get Them Wet"	Michael Chang & Stephanie Gonzaga	Tze Chun	May 23, 2023
2	2	"Never Feed Them After Midnight"	Vaughn Ross	Brendan Hay	May 23, 2023
3	3	"Always Buy a Ticket"	Stephanie Gonzaga	Anna Christopher	June 1, 2023
4	4	"Don't Drink the Tea"	Alexandra Chiu	Sarah Nerboso	June 1, 2023
5	5	"Always Stab or Run"	Vaughn Ross	Peter Chen	June 8, 2023
6	6	"Always Buy a God a Drink First"	Stephanie Gonzaga	Brendan Hay	June 8, 2023
7	7	"Never Squeeze a Fox"	Alex Chiu	Anna Christopher	June 15, 2023
8	8	"Never Hug a Mogwai"	Vaughn Ross	Sarah Nerboso	June 15, 2023
9	9	"Never Give Up"	Stephanie Gonzaga	Brendan Hay	June 22, 2023
10	10	"Never Ever Expose Them to Bright Light"	Alex Chu	Tze Chun	June 22, 2023

=== Season 2: The Wild Batch (2024–25) ===
No. overall	No. in season	Title	Directed by	Written by	Original release date
11	1	"Always Be Ready for Adventure"	Jasmine Goggins & Vaughn Ross	Tze Chun	October 3, 2024
12	2	"Never Take the Tour"	Stephanie Gonzaga	Anna Christopher	October 3, 2024
13	3	"Never Use Double Negatives"	Alex Chiu	Brendan Hay	October 3, 2024
14	4	"Always Bring a Toothpick"	Jasmine Goggins	Sarah Nerboso	October 3, 2024
15	5	"There's Always a Fortune in the Cookie Factory"	Stephanie Gonzaga	Felicia Ho	October 3, 2024
16	6	"Never Get Out of the Truck"	Alex Chiu	Anna Christopher	April 10, 2025
17	7	"Always Ask for Backstory"	Jasmine Goggins	Sarah Nerboso	April 10, 2025
18	8	"Never Try the Cider"	Stephanie Gonzaga	Jo Claes & Felicia Ho	April 10, 2025
19	9	"Always or Never Make Wishes"	Alex Chiu	Brendan Hay	April 10, 2025
20	10	"Always Make the Hard Choice"	Jasmine Goggins	Tze Chun	April 10, 2025

== Development ==
On February 25, 2019, WarnerMedia greenlit an animated series based on Gremlins, for its streaming service HBO Max. Tze Chun was confirmed to write the series and serve as an executive producer with Darryl Frank, Justin Falvey, Sam Register, and Brendan Hay. On July 1, 2019, the series, now titled Gremlins: Secrets of the Mogwai, was given a series order of 10 episodes.

In February 2020, Joe Dante, director of the original two films, revealed that he acted as a consultant for the series. In July of that same year, it was revealed that Howie Mandel would not reprise his role as Gizmo for the series. On February 17, 2021, ahead of the series premiere, HBO Max renewed the series for a second season at the TCA virtual Press Tour.

In February 2021, the voice cast of Izaac Wang, Ming-Na Wen, B. D. Wong, James Hong, Matthew Rhys, and Gabrielle Green was announced, with A.J. LoCascio voicing Gizmo. In December 2021, the first clip was shown in an HBO Max trailer for 2022 releases. In July 2022, Zach Galligan, Sandra Oh, Randall Park, George Takei, and Bowen Yang were revealed to have roles in the series. Galligan previously portrayed Gizmo's modern-day owner Billy Peltzer in both Gremlins films. Animation for the series was provided by Blue Spirit Productions and 88 Pictures.

In July 2024, it was announced that John Glover, Michael Paul Chan, Ronny Chieng, Keith David, Will Forte, Kelly Hu, Simu Liu, and Jimmy O. Yang had joined the cast of Gremlins: Secrets of the Mogwai - Season 2: The Wild Batch. Glover previously portrayed Daniel Clamp in Gremlins 2: The New Batch.

== Release ==
The first episode of Gremlins: Secrets of the Mogwai had its world premiere at the Annecy International Animation Film Festival on June 13, 2022, before the 10-episode series debuted with the launch of Max on May 23, 2023. The series would have aired on Cartoon Network as part of their ACME Night block. However, the block moved to Adult Swim in September 2023 before that could happen. The series aired in the United Kingdom on CBBC, BBC Three and BBC iPlayer on October 30, 2023. The series also aired in Japan on Cartoon Network Japan on November 8, 2025 (which was along with "The Deal" (from the episode of The Amazing World of Gumball) and "Pet Feud" (from the episode of The Powerpuff Girls (1998)).

The first half of the second season, which is subtitled "The Wild Batch", debuted on October 3, 2024. The second half of the second season was released on April 10, 2025.

== Reception ==
=== Critical reception ===
For the first season, the review aggregator website Rotten Tomatoes reported a 100% approval rating with an average rating of 8.4/10 based on 21 critics. The website's consensus reads: "Recapturing the original movies' blend of cuteness and mayhem, Secrets of the Mogwai is delightful family entertainment -- just don't feed it after midnight." On Metacritic, the series has a weighted average score of 78 out of 100 based on reviews from nine critics, indicating "generally favorable reviews".

For the second season, the review aggregator website Rotten Tomatoes reported a 100% approval rating with an average rating of 7.6/10 based on 7 critics.

=== Accolades ===
Year	Award	Category	Nominee(s)	Result	Ref.
2024	Saturn Awards	Best Animated Television Series or Special	Gremlins: Secrets of the Mogwai	Nominated	
2024	Annie Awards	Outstanding Achievement for Storyboarding in an Animated Television / Broadcast Production	Leah Artwick (for "Never Give Up")	Nominated	
2024	Producers Guild Awards	Outstanding Children's Program	Gremlins: Secrets of the Mogwai	Nominated	
2025	Saturn Awards	Best Animated Television Series or Special	Gremlins: The Wild Batch	Nominated	
2025	Annie Awards	Best Animated Television/Broadcast Production for Children	Gremlins: The Wild Batch (for "Never Use Double Negatives")	Nominated	
2025	Children's and Family Emmy Awards	Outstanding Casting for an Animated Program	Agnes Kim and Sarah Noonan	Won	
2025	Children's and Family Emmy Awards	Outstanding Music Direction and Composition for an Animated Program	Sherri Chung	Nominated	
