= Gremlins =

1984 film by Joe Dante

- Theatrical release poster by John Alvin
- Directed by: Joe Dante
- Written by: Chris Columbus
- Produced by: Michael Finnell
- Starring: Zach Galligan; Phoebe Cates; Hoyt Axton; Polly Holliday; Frances Lee McCain
- Cinematography: John Hora
- Edited by: Tina Hirsch
- Music by: Jerry Goldsmith
- Production companies: Warner Bros.; Amblin Entertainment
- Distributed by: Warner Bros.
- Release date: June 8, 1984
- Running time: 106 minutes
- Country: United States
- Language: English
- Budget: $11 million
- Box office: $212.9 million

Gremlins is a 1984 American comedy horror film directed by Joe Dante, written by Chris Columbus and starring Zach Galligan, Phoebe Cates, Hoyt Axton, Polly Holliday and Frances Lee McCain, with Frank Welker providing the voice of the titular imp-like monsters' leader and main antagonist, Stripe, and Howie Mandel providing the voice of their progenitor, mogwai Gizmo. It draws on legends of folkloric mischievous creatures that cause malfunctions—"gremlins"—in the British Royal Air Force going back to World War II. The story follows Billy Peltzer, who receives Gizmo as a pet, who then spawns more of his kind that evolve into the titular monsters that wreak havoc on Billy's hometown during Christmas Eve.

The film was accompanied by a large merchandising campaign and juxtaposes comedy horror with a Christmas time setting. Steven Spielberg was the executive producer, with the film being produced by Michael Finnell.

Gremlins was theatrically released on June 8, 1984, by Warner Bros. to critical and commercial success. However, it was heavily criticized for some of its more violent sequences. In response to this and to similar complaints about Indiana Jones and the Temple of Doom, Spielberg suggested that the Motion Picture Association of America (MPAA) revise its rating system, which it did within two months of the film's release, creating a new PG-13 rating. (Note: Contrary to popular belief, Indiana Jones and the Temple of Doom and Gremlins were both released in the U.S. with a PG (not PG-13) rating, although controversy surrounding the two films did lead to the subsequent creation of the PG-13 rating. The first film to be issued the new PG-13 rating was The Flamingo Kid, although Red Dawn was the first to be released theatrically under the new rating. Conversely, the British Board of Film Classification (BBFC) elected to give Gremlins a 15 rating, rather than the desired PG, meaning under 15s could not view the film. Some complained to the BBFC that the rating was too strict. The BBFC did not yet use 12 or 12A certificates, and upon the film's 2012 re-release, it was re-rated 12A.) It was followed by a sequel, Gremlins 2: The New Batch (1990), while a third film is set to be released in October 6, 2028.

== Plot ==
Struggling inventor Randall Peltzer visits a Chinatown antique store to find a Christmas present for his son, Billy. In it, Randall uncovers a small and furry creature called a mogwai (Cantonese: 魔怪, 'devil'). The owner, Sam Wing, refuses to sell it to him, but his grandson secretly does, warning Randall to remember three important rules concerning its care – keep the mogwai away from light, especially sunlight, which will kill it; do not let it come in contact with water; and above all, never let it eat after midnight.

In Randall's hometown of Kingston Falls, Billy works at its local bank, but fears that his dog Barney will be put down by widowed miser Ruby Deagle. His father returns and offers him the mogwai, now named "Gizmo", as a pet and informs him of the rules. Gizmo is friendly and docile, but when Billy's friend, Pete Fountaine, accidentally spills water on him, five more mogwai spawn from him – a more mischievous sort led by the aggressive Stripe, named after the mohawk-like tuft of white fur on his head. Billy shows one of the mogwai to his former elementary school science teacher, Roy Hanson, spawning another, whom the latter experiments on. Back home, Stripe and his fellow mogwai deceive Billy into feeding them after midnight by sabotaging his bedside clock. They form cocoons, as does Hanson's mogwai, which soon hatch, emerging as destructive and reptilian imp-like monsters called "gremlins". Hanson is murdered by his gremlin, while those at the Peltzer house torture Gizmo and assault Billy's mother, Lynn.

The duo are able to dispatch all the gremlins sans Stripe, who escapes to the local YMCA where he jumps into its swimming pool, spawning an army of gremlins that wreak havoc on Kingston Falls. Many locals are injured or outright killed during their rampage, including Deagle. The police are helpless in the ordeal, as they too fall victim to the gremlins' mischief. Billy rescues his co-worker and girlfriend, Kate Beringer, when the gremlins invade the bar she works at, and they seek refuge in the bank. Kate discloses that her father went missing on Christmas Eve when she was nine years old, but was then found dead in their house's chimney several days later. Planning to surprise his family while portraying Santa Claus, he inadvertently slipped and broke his neck while climbing down it. Still suffering from post-traumatic stress disorder due to this incident, Kate confesses how it led to her dislike of the holidays.

The trio find the gremlins gathered in the local movie theater due to morning approaching and set off a natural gas explosion, killing them all except for Stripe, who left the theater earlier to retrieve candy at a Montgomery Ward store across the street. They follow Stripe into the store, where he attempts to use a fountain to spawn more gremlins, but Gizmo then opens a nearby skylight, exposing Stripe to sunlight and killing him.

In the aftermath, Wing arrives at the Peltzer house to reclaim Gizmo as he scolds the family for their negligence and criticizes Western society for its carelessness with nature. However, as he turns to leave, Gizmo, having bonded with Billy, bids him goodbye. A compassionate Wing then concedes that Billy may be ready to properly care for him one day.

== Cast ==
- Zach Galligan as Billy Peltzer
- Phoebe Cates as Kate Beringer
- Hoyt Axton as Randall "Rand" Peltzer
- Polly Holliday as Ruby Deagle
- Frances Lee McCain as Lynn Peltzer
- Judge Reinhold as Gerald Hopkins
- Dick Miller as Murray Futterman
- Glynn Turman as Roy Hanson
- Keye Luke as Sam Wing
- Scott Brady as Sheriff Frank Reilly
- Corey Feldman as Pete Fountaine
- Jonathan Banks as Deputy Brent Frye
- Edward Andrews as Roland Corben
- Jackie Joseph as Sheila Futterman
- Belinda Balaski as Mrs. Harris
- Harry Carey Jr. as Mr. Anderson
- Nicky Katt and Tracy Wells as schoolchildren
- John Louie as Wing's unnamed grandson
- Kenny Davis as Dorry
- Mushroom as Barney
- John C. Becher as Doctor Molinar

The film features various cameos from crew members or guests. Steven Spielberg cameos as a man riding a recumbent bicycle; Jim McKrell plays Lew Landers; composer Jerry Goldsmith plays a man in a telephone booth; Kenneth Tobey plays a filling station attendant; and William Schallert plays Father Bartlett. Animator Chuck Jones plays Mr. Jones, Billy's drawing mentor; he would later conceive the Looney Tunes-centric segments for the sequel, Gremlins 2: The New Batch (1990).

=== Voices ===
- Howie Mandel as Gizmo
  - Ilene Keys additionally provided the character's singing voice (uncredited)
- Frank Welker as Stripe
- Don Steele as Rockin' Ricky Rialto
- Marvin Miller as Robby the Robot (uncredited)

The vocal effects of the mogwai and gremlins were provided by Mandel, Welker, Brad Kesten (uncredited), Michael Winslow, Bob Bergen, Fred Newman, Peter Cullen, Jim Cummings (unused), Sonny Melendrez (uncredited), Mark Dodson, Bob Holt, Michael Sheehan and director Joe Dante (uncredited).

== Production ==
=== Background ===
Gremlins was produced at a time when combining horror and comedy was becoming increasingly popular. According to Professor Noël Carroll, Ghostbusters, released the same weekend as Gremlins, and the comic strip The Far Side additionally followed this trend. Carroll argued that there was now a new genre emphasizing sudden shifts between humorous and horrific scenes, drawing laughs with plot elements that have been traditionally used to scare.

The notion of gremlins was first conceived during the 1920s when mechanical failures in RAF aircraft were jokingly blamed on the small monsters. The term "gremlins" also entered popular culture as children's author and RAF pilot Roald Dahl published a book called The Gremlins in 1943, based on the mischievous creatures. Walt Disney considered making a film of it. A Bugs Bunny cartoon of the era, Falling Hare, shows Bugs battling a gremlin on an airplane. Joe Dante had read The Gremlins and said that the book was of some influence on his film. In 1983, Dante publicly distanced his work from earlier films, explaining, "Our gremlins are somewhat different—they're sort of green, and they have big mouths, and they smile a lot and they do incredibly, really nasty things to people and enjoy it all the while".

=== Development ===
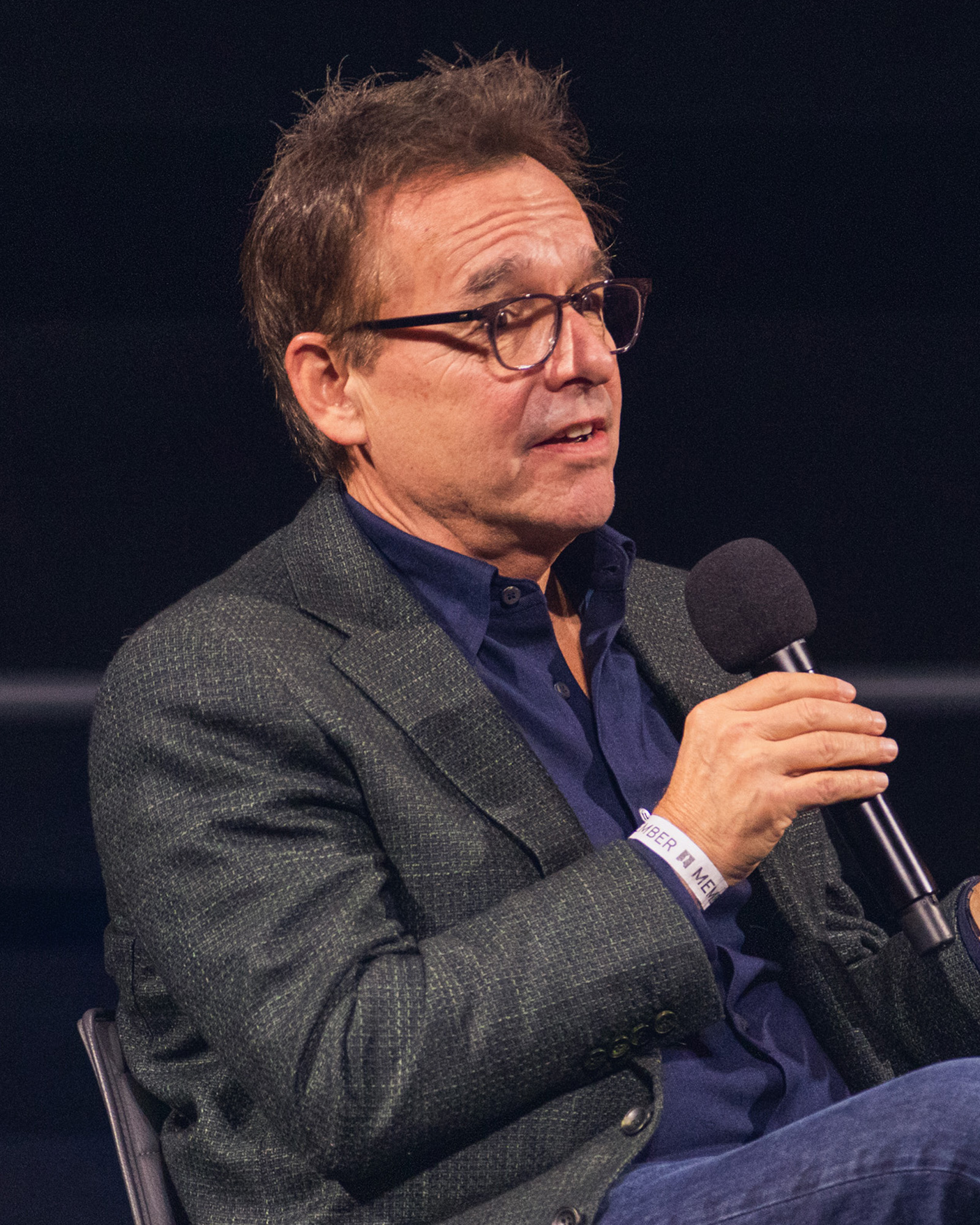
Chris Columbus conceived of the idea for Gremlins and wrote the initial draft as a spec script.

The story of Gremlins was conceived by Chris Columbus in around July of 1981. As Columbus explained, his inspiration came from his loft, when at night "what sounded like a platoon of mice would come out and to hear them skittering around in the blackness was really creepy". He then wrote the original screenplay as a spec script to show potential employers that he had writing abilities. He also made rough concept art for the Gremlins. In the first draft the main characters were originally going to be 12 years old. Columbus finished the spec script after spending roughly six weeks working on it.

The story was not actually intended to be filmed. This changed in early 1982 when Steven Spielberg came across the spec script. In April 1982 the second draft was written, still at that point a R-rated horror film. This draft is the earliest version available online. As Spielberg explained, "It's one of the most original things I've come across in many years, which is why I bought it." Spielberg considered Tim Burton to direct the film after seeing his short film Frankenweenie.

After deciding to executive produce the film himself, Spielberg chose Dante as his director because of his experience with horror-comedy in The Howling. In the time between The Howling and the offer to film Gremlins, Dante had experienced a lull in his career. He began doing storyboard work on the film while also working as a director on Twilight Zone: The Movie (1983), a film on which Spielberg also served as a director. The film's producer was Michael Finnell, who had also worked on The Howling with Dante. Spielberg took the project to Warner Bros. and co-produced it through his own company, Amblin Entertainment.

Designer Chris Walas spoke on the creation of the initial concept of the creatures, "After reading the script, my first idea was to take the tarsier, a little primate, and give it cartoony proportions. I wanted the big eyes to make it cute. I showed it to Mike Finnell and Joe Dante and they asked for some tweaks, so I made the next one. This is more like a puppy. Big, floppy ears. It's not based on any one dog in particular — just a Cocker Spaniel or something. Fortunately they did not go with it. These were the only two Mogwai I sculpted before the final one."

The film's script went through a few drafts before a shooting script was finalized. The early drafts were much darker than the final film. Various scenes were cut, including one which portrayed Billy's mother being decapitated during her struggle with the gremlins, with her head thrown down the stairs when Billy arrives. Dante later explained the scene made the film darker than the filmmakers wanted. There was also a scene where the gremlins ate Billy's dog and a scene where the gremlins attacked a McDonald's, eating customers instead of burgers.

In the earliest draft available online, the second draft. There isn’t a clear leader of the gremlins. No Stripe and no Gizmo. The idea of Stripe might have originated from the original 1981 spec script. However Gizmo— originally called Lefty, as well as the snowplow scene were conceived by writer John Sayles. Who assisted with the script in July 1982.

At one point in development Gizmo was supposed to transform into the main villain of Stripe. Spielberg overruled this plot element as he felt Gizmo was cute and that audiences would want him to be present throughout the film.

The film mentions an urban legend in which Kate reveals in a speech that her father died at Christmas when he dressed as Santa Claus and broke his neck while climbing down the family's chimney. After the film was completed, studio executives insisted upon its removal, because they felt it was too ambiguous as to whether it was supposed to be funny or sad. Dante refused to take the scene out, saying it represented the film as a whole, which had a combination of horrific and comedic elements. Spielberg did not like the scene but, despite his creative control, he viewed Gremlins as Dante's project and allowed him to leave it in. A parody of this scene is featured in Gremlins 2: The New Batch.

=== Casting ===
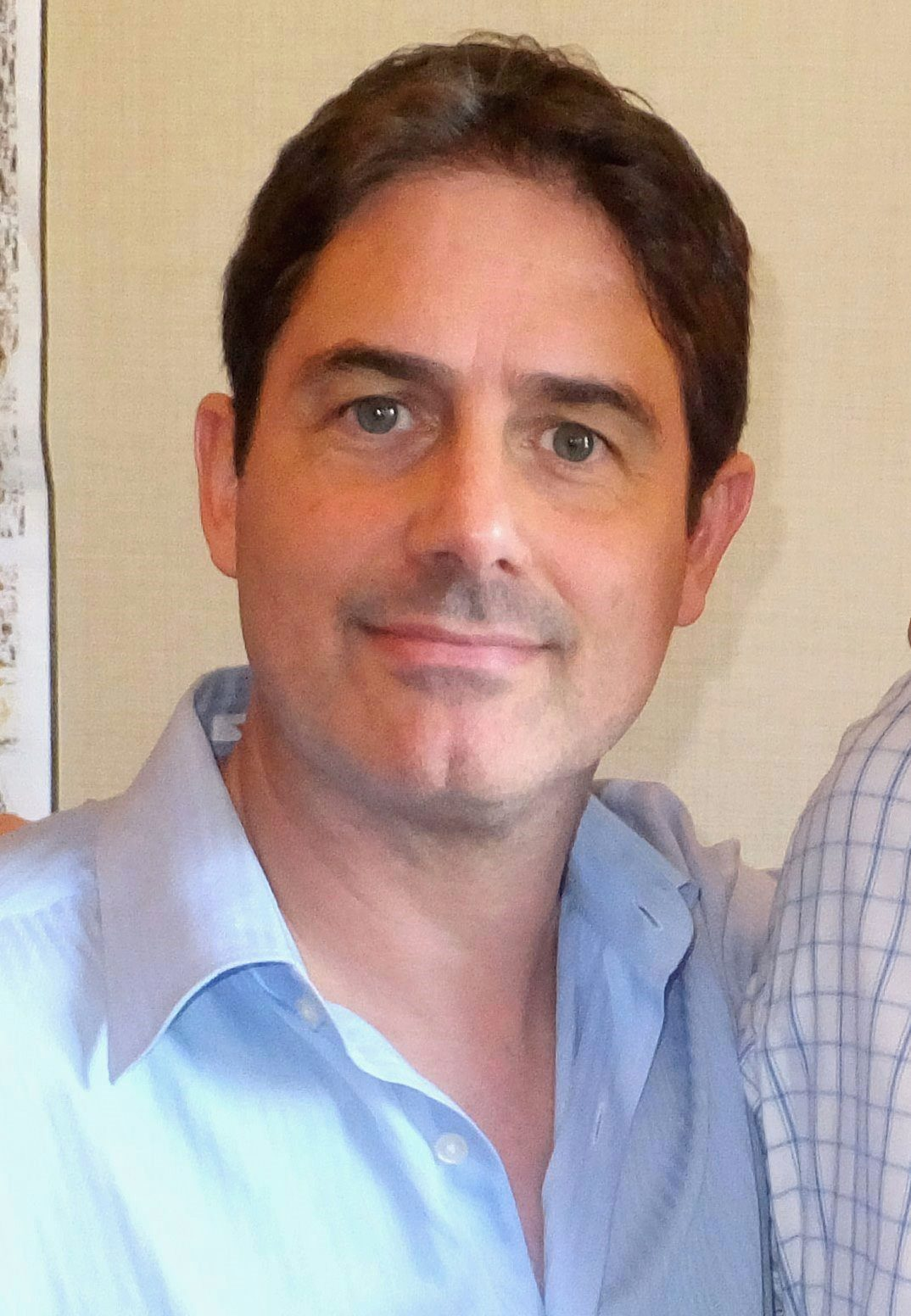
Zach Galligan was a relatively unknown actor when cast as the lead character Billy.

Phoebe Cates was cast as Kate, Billy's girlfriend, despite concerns that she was known for playing more risqué parts, such as Linda Barrett in Fast Times at Ridgemont High (1982). Spielberg urged the casting of the relatively unknown Zach Galligan as Billy because he saw chemistry between Galligan and Cates during auditions. Galligan later compared himself to Billy, saying he was a "geeky kid", and that being in the film "was really kind of a dream" given "what I get to do, what my character gets to do, blow up movie theatres", adding that he "got to work with great people". Spielberg commented when Galligan was testing with Cates that "he's in love with her already" and that was how Galligan won the part. Tom Hanks, Kevin Bacon, Ralph Macchio, Emilio Estevez, Rob Lowe and Judd Nelson also auditioned.

In contrast to Galligan, many of the supporting actors and actresses were better known. Veteran actor Glynn Turman portrayed the high school science teacher whose study of a newborn mogwai leads to his death after it forms a cocoon and emerges as a vicious gremlin. Dick Miller, who was a regular in Dante's films, was another experienced actor on the set, playing a World War II veteran who first refers to the creatures as gremlins. Rand was played by Hoyt Axton, who was always the filmmakers' preferred choice for the role even though it was widely contested by other actors. Axton's experience included acting as the father in The Black Stallion (1979), and he was also a country music singer-songwriter. After an introductory scene to Gremlins was cut, Axton's voice earned him the added role of the narrator to establish some context. Mr. Wing was played by Keye Luke, a renowned film actor, whose film career spanned half a century. Although in reality he was around 80 at the time of filming, and his character was very elderly, Luke's youthful appearance had to be covered by make-up.

Corey Feldman, who up to that time had primarily been in commercials, played Pete Fountaine, establishing his early credentials as a child actor; he previously met with Spielberg when he auditioned for E.T. the Extra-Terrestrial. Polly Holliday, an actress best known for her role in Alice, played Mrs. Deagle. Dante considered the casting fortunate, as she was well-known, and he considered her to be talented. Two other well-known actors, Fast Times' Judge Reinhold and character actor Edward Andrews, received roles that were significantly reduced after the film was edited; they played Billy's superiors at the bank. Tom Hanks also read for Gerald.

=== Special effects ===
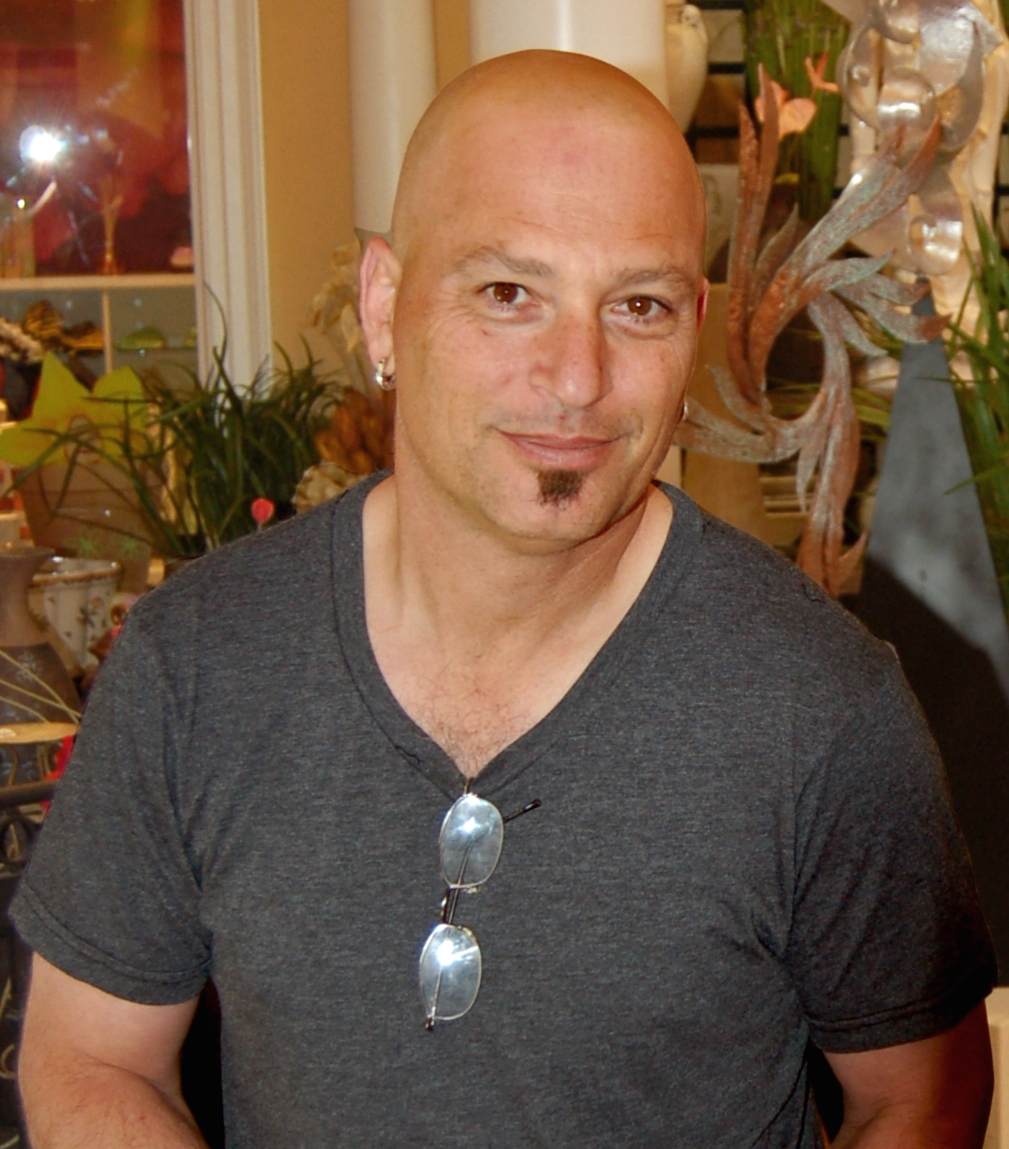
Comedian Howie Mandel provided the voice of Gizmo.

Some of the performances were shot on the Courthouse Square and Colonial Street sets of the Universal Studios Lot in Universal City, California (Mrs. Deagle's house was one such set as well as the opening street scenes in Chinatown, which were filmed on the Warner Bros. Studios backlot). This required fake snow; Dante also felt it was an atmosphere that would make the special effects more convincing.

An earlier attempt to use monkeys to interpret the gremlins was abandoned because the test monkey panicked when made to wear a gremlin head. Puppets and marionettes were used instead, so the actors worked alongside them in most scenes. Nevertheless, after the actors finished their work for good, a great deal of effort was spent finishing the effects.

Rob Bottin and John Dykstra were originally considered to do the special effects, Bottin was Dante's first choice; but he was busy working on Legend (1985). Dante eventually brought in Chris Walas, who worked on his directorial debut Piranha (1978). While the Gremlins were specifically designed to be hand puppets, including specialized puppets that only did one action such as crawl, skateboard, and hang from the lights, the small size of the Mogwai forced Gizmo to be largely animatronic. Walas designed numerous small rubber puppets to portray Gizmo and the gremlins, and said he cannot estimate an accurate number "since we cannibalized a lot of them to create new puppets along the way". There was more than one Gizmo puppet, and occasionally Galligan, when carrying one, would set him down off camera, and when Gizmo appeared again sitting on a surface it was actually a different puppet wired to the surface. These puppets had many limitations. The Gizmo puppets were particularly frustrating because they were smaller and thus broke down more. While Walas recommended making the mogwai larger to make their creation and functioning easier for the special effects team, Dante insisted on keeping their size small to enhance the cuteness of the creatures. Consequently, to satisfy the crew, a scene was included in which the gremlins hang Gizmo on a wall and throw darts at him. This was included on a list that the crew created known to them as the "Horrible Things to do to Gizmo" list.

Other effects required large mogwai faces and ears to be produced for close-ups, as the puppets were less capable of conveying emotion. Consequently, large props simulating food were needed for the close-ups in the scene in which the mogwai feast after midnight. An enlarged Gizmo puppet was also needed for the scene in which he multiplies. The new mogwai, who popped out of Gizmo's body as small, furry balls which then started to grow, were balloons and expanded as such. Walas had also created the exploding gremlin in the microwave by means of a balloon that was allowed to burst.

Howie Mandel provided the voice of Gizmo and prolific voice actor Frank Welker provided the voice of the gremlins' leader, Stripe. It was Welker who suggested Mandel perform in Gremlins. The puppets' lines were mostly invented by the voice actors, based on cues from the physical actions of the puppets, which were filmed before the voice work. When developing the voice for Gizmo, Mandel explained, "[Gizmo was] cute and naive, so, you know, I got in touch with that... I couldn't envision going any other way or do something different with it". The majority of the other gremlins' voices were performed by Michael Winslow and Peter Cullen, while the remaining voices were done by Mandel, Welker, Bob Bergen, Fred Newman, Jim Cummings, Sonny Melendrez, Mark Dodson, Bob Holt, Michael Sheehan and even Dante himself.

=== Music ===
The film's score was composed and conducted by Jerry Goldsmith, who won a Saturn Award for Best Music for his efforts, and performed by the Hollywood Studio Symphony. The main score was composed to convey "the mischievous humor and mounting suspense of Gremlins". Goldsmith also wrote Gizmo's song, which was hummed by Ilene Keys, a child actress and acquaintance of Goldsmith, rather than Mandel himself. Goldsmith also appears in the film, alongside Steven Spielberg, in the scene where Rand calls home from the salesman's convention.

The soundtrack album was released by Geffen Records as a specially priced 7-cut mini-album on LP and cassette (Goldsmith's music comprised all of side two) and reissued on compact disc in 1993 only in Germany.

1. "Gremlins...Mega Madness" (Michael Sembello) – 3:50
2. "Make It Shine" (Quarterflash) – 4:10
3. "Out Out" – (Peter Gabriel) – 7:00
4. "The Gift" – 4:51
5. "Gizmo" – 4:09
6. "Mrs. Deagle" – 2:50
7. "The Gremlin Rag" – 4:03

"Gremlins...Mega Madness" was also released as a single, with "The Gremlin Rag" as its B-side (The USA release has Late For Work).

In 2011, Film Score Monthly issued a two-disc release of the soundtrack, with the complete score on disc one and the original soundtrack album on disc two (representing the latter's first North American CD issue); this was the label's final Jerry Goldsmith album. A CD release by Warner Archive Collection was released through WaterTower Music on October 10, 2015.

DISC ONE: The Film Score

1. "Fanfare in C" (Max Steiner) / "The Shop" / "The Little One" – 4:30
2. "Late for Work" – 1:46
3. "Mrs. Deagle / That Dog" – 2:22
4. "The Gift" – 1:45
5. "First Aid" – 2:17
6. "Spilt Water" – 3:02
7. "A New One" – 1:10
8. "The Lab / Old Times" – 2:35
9. "The Injection" – 2:56
10. "Snack Time / The Wrong Time" – 1:49
11. "The Box" – 1:24
12. "First Aid" – 1:39
13. "Disconnected / Hurry Home" – 1:03
14. "Kitchen Fight" – 4:06
15. "Dirty Linen" – 0:43
16. "The Pool" – 1:07
17. "The Plow / Special Delivery" – 1:16
18. "High Flyer" – 2:22
19. "Too Many Gremlins" – 2:06
20. "No Santa Claus" – 3:27
21. "After Theatre" – 1:39
22. "Theatre Escape / Stripe Is Loose / Toy Dept. / No Gizmo" – 4:36
23. "The Fountain / Stripe's Death" – 5:42
24. "Goodbye, Billy" – 2:56
25. "End Title / The Gremlin Rag" – 4:10
26. "Blues" – 2:17
27. "Mrs. Deagle [film version]" – 1:27
28. "God Rest You Merry, Gentlemen" (traditional, arr. Alexander Courage) – 1:12
29. "After Theatre" [with "Silent Night"] – 1:36
30. "After Theatre" [without "Silent Night"] – 1:36
31. "Rabbit Rampage" (Milt Franklyn) – 0:47
32. "The Gremlin Rag [full version]" – 3:35
33. "Gizmo's New Song" – 0:35
34. "Gizmo's Trumpet" – 0:30

Tracks 26–34 are listed as bonus tracks.

DISC TWO: 1984 Soundtrack Album

1. "Gremlins...Mega Madness" (Michael Sembello) – 3:52
2. "Make It Shine" (Quarterflash) – 4:11
3. "Out Out" – (Peter Gabriel) – 7:02
4. "The Gift" – 4:58
5. "Gizmo" – 4:14
6. "Mrs. Deagle" – 2:54
7. "The Gremlin Rag" – 4:13

== Reception ==
=== Box office ===
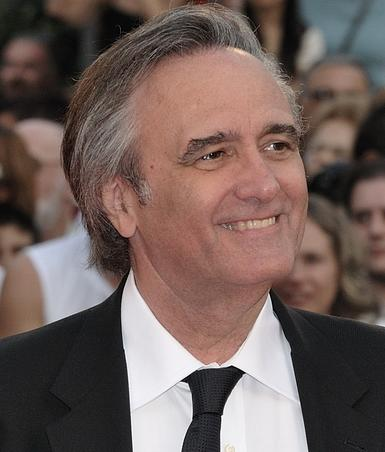
Director Joe Dante acknowledged some parents were upset after taking their children to see Gremlins in theaters.

Financially, Gremlins was a success. Produced on an $11 million budget, it was more expensive than Spielberg had originally intended but still relatively cheap for its time. The trailer introduced the film to audiences by briefly explaining that Billy receives a strange creature as a Christmas present, by going over the three rules, and then coming out with the fact that the creatures transform into terrible monsters. This trailer showed little of either the mogwai or the gremlins. In contrast to this, other advertisements concentrated on Gizmo, overlooked the gremlins, and made the film look similar to Spielberg's earlier family film E.T. the Extra-Terrestrial (1982).

Gremlins was released into North American theaters on June 8, 1984, the same day as Ivan Reitman's Ghostbusters. Gremlins ranked second, with $12.5 million in its first weekend, $1.1 million less than Ghostbusters. By the end of its American screenings on November 29, it had grossed $148,168,459 domestically. This made it the fourth highest-grossing film of the year, behind Beverly Hills Cop, Ghostbusters, and Indiana Jones and the Temple of Doom. Since Gremlins had an international audience, different versions of the film were made to overcome cultural barriers. Mandel learned to speak his few intelligible lines, such as "Bright light!", in various languages, including German. Regional music and humor were also incorporated into foreign-language versions. Dante credited this work as being one of the factors that helped to make Gremlins a worldwide success.

Discussing the film's violence, Dante later told reporters that "the idea of taking a 4-year-old to see Gremlins, thinking it's going to be a cuddly, funny animal movie and then seeing that it turns into a horror picture, I think people were upset... They felt like they had been sold something family-friendly and it wasn't entirely family-friendly".

The film became available to audiences again when it was returned to theaters on August 30, 1985. This additional release brought its gross up to $153,083,102, making it Warner Bros.' most successful film at the time, a record that stood until Batman surpassed it in 1989.

By February 1985, the film had grossed $59.6 million internationally, including $17 million in Japan. It grossed a further $0.2 million in 2019, taking its worldwide gross to over $212.9 million.

=== Critical response ===
Roger Ebert approved of the film, awarding it three out of four and declaring it to not only be "fun", but also a "sly series of send-ups", effectively parodying many elemental film storylines. In his opinion, Gremlins did this partly through depictions of mysterious worlds (the shop in Chinatown) and tyrannical elderly women (Mrs. Deagle). Ebert also believed the rule in which a mogwai cannot eat after midnight was inspired by fairy tales, and that the final scenes parody classic horror films. He connected Kate's speech about her father with "the great tradition of 1950s sick jokes". Gene Siskel gave the film three-and-a-half out of four, describing it as "a wickedly funny and slightly sick ride", and "a most original work. We're aware at every moment that someone is trying to entertain us. Playfulness abounds." Variety declared, "Make room for adorable 'Gremlins' dolls on the shelves and start counting the take for another calculated audience pleaser from the Steven Spielberg-Frank Marshall-Kathleen Kennedy team. But that's all that's here in this showy display of technical talent, otherwise nearly heedless of dramatic concerns."

Vincent Canby of The New York Times was mixed, writing that the film "is far more interested in showing off its knowledge of movie lore and making random jokes than in providing consistent entertainment. Unfortunately, it's funniest when being most nasty." Leonard Maltin disapproved of the film, and his view was made clear in remarks he made on the television show Entertainment Tonight. He called the film "icky" and "gross". He later wrote that despite being set in a "picture-postcard town" and blending the feel of It's a Wonderful Life (a clip of which appears in Gremlins) with that of The Blob, the film is "negated by too-vivid violence and mayhem"; giving the film two out of four. Maltin later made a cameo appearance in Gremlins 2, repeating his criticisms of the original on film, as an in-joke, before being throttled by the creatures; he later gave the second film a more positive rating, three out of four.

John Nubbin reviewed Gremlins for Different Worlds magazine and stated that "All in all, it is just another exploitation film. Trading on Spielberg's name and reputation, it is merely a money-maker - just another summer film which in the end has nothing to keep it in our memories past Thanksgiving." Colin Greenland reviewed Gremlins for Imagine magazine, and stated that "Two or three good jokes, three or four neat scenes, lots of detail, but overall, a manic melee of pyrotechnics that made random grabs for my sympathy and failed to hold my attention, A bit more coherent thought, and who knows, it might have been something good." One BBC critic wrote in 2000 that "the plot is thin and the pacing is askew", but nevertheless praised the film's use of dark humour and its contrast with the idyllic Christmas setting. In 2002, another critic wrote that in hindsight, Gremlins has "corny special effects" and that the film will tend to appeal to children more so than to adults; he also said the acting was dull.

Despite the initial mixed criticism, Gremlins has continued to receive praise over the years and is considered by many critics to be one of the best films of 1984. On review aggregator Rotten Tomatoes, the film holds an approval rating of 86% based on 91 reviews. The website's critical consensus reads, "Whether you choose to see it as a statement on consumer culture or simply a special effects-heavy popcorn flick, Gremlins is a minor classic." On Metacritic, the film received a score of 70 based on 13 reviews.

=== Themes and interpretations ===
While some critics criticized the film's depictions of violence and greed—such as death scenes, Kate's speech and the gremlins' gluttony—for lacking comic value, scholar Charlotte Miller instead interpreted these as a satire of "some characteristics of Western civilization", suggesting that Westerners may take too much satisfaction from violence. Gremlins can also be interpreted as a statement against technology, in that some characters, such as Billy's father, are overly dependent on it. In contrast, Mr. Wing is shown to have a strong distaste for television. Kirkpatrick Sale also interpreted Gremlins as an anti-technology film in his book Rebels Against the Future. Another scholar suggested that the film is meant to express a number of observations of society by having the gremlin characters shift in what they are meant to represent. At different times, they are depicted as teenagers, the wealthy establishment, and fans of Disney films.

Another scholar drew a connection between the microwave scene and urban legends about pets dying in microwave ovens. He described the portrayal of this urban legend in the film as successful, but that meant it seemed terrible. This is indeed a scene that is thought of as being one of the film's most violent depictions; with even Roger Ebert expressing some fear in his review that the film might encourage children to try similar things with their pets. Catherine Lester casts doubt on whether any children actually did attempt this as a result of seeing the film. Situating Gremlins in the children's horror genre, she argues that child viewers are invited to identify with the gremlins themselves, whose rebellious behaviour may function as a source of subversive pleasure.

Some commentators have interpreted the film as containing anti-colonial themes. In this reading, Randall Peltzer's acquisition of Gizmo from Mr. Wing is viewed as an act of appropriation, with the ensuing chaos resulting from the Peltzers' inability to understand or properly care for the creature. The film's conclusion, in which Mr. Wing reclaims Gizmo and criticizes the family's actions, has been interpreted as reinforcing the idea that Gizmo was removed from his original cultural context without adequate understanding or authority.

=== Accolades ===
Award	Date of ceremony	Category	Recipient(s)	Result	Ref(s)
Goldene Leinwand	March 27, 1985	Goldene Leinwand	Joe Dante	Won	
Saturn Awards	June 9, 1985	Best Horror Film		Won	
Saturn Awards	June 9, 1985	Best Director	Joe Dante	Won	
Saturn Awards	June 9, 1985	Best Supporting Actor	Dick Miller	Nominated	
Saturn Awards	June 9, 1985	Best Supporting Actress	Polly Holliday	Won	
Saturn Awards	June 9, 1985	Best Younger Actor	Corey Feldman	Nominated	
Saturn Awards	June 9, 1985	Best Writing	Chris Columbus	Nominated	
Saturn Awards	June 9, 1985	Best Music	Jerry Goldsmith	Won	
Saturn Awards	June 9, 1985	Best Special Effects	Chris Walas	Won	
Saturn Awards	June 9, 1985	Best Make-Up	Greg LaCava	Nominated	
Young Artist Awards	December 2, 1984	Best Family Motion Picture – Adventure		Won	
Young Artist Awards	December 2, 1984	Best Young Supporting Actor	Corey Feldman	Nominated	

=== Home media ===
Warner Home Video released Gremlins on VHS, CED Videodisc, and Betamax on November 25, 1985. The film was released on DVD in 1997 in a bare bones presentation. It included both full screen and widescreen versions and the film's trailer. It was repackaged in August, 1999 with the same disc, but a different cover. On August 20, 2002, a "special edition" DVD was released, which featured cast and filmmakers' commentary and deleted scenes. A 25th anniversary Blu-ray edition was released on December 1, 2009. The film was again released on home video in 4K Ultra HD on October 1, 2019.

The film grossed $15.2 million in home sales on DVD and Blu-Ray.

== Gremlins 1983 rough cut ==
For many years, rumors existed of an extended cut of the film. On February 26, 2026, Joe Dante confirmed that not only did it exist, but he presented a nearly 3-hour VHS copy of the film labeled 11/23/83 – Gremlins 1st Assembly to The Gremlins Museum fan site, along with a second VHS labeled Gremlins Outtakes that included an additional 40 minutes of deleted and alternate footage. The rough cut of the film, which has a runtime of 2 hours and 35 minutes (nearly an hour longer than the final theatrical cut) presents the film in its earliest form with longer and alternative takes, deleted plot points, larger character arcs, camera audio with animatronic puppet sounds which give the movie a completely different feel than the final released film. Some of the outtake footage is made up of entirely unique sequences written and filmed, but ultimately cut before the final cut.

The Gremlins Museum cannot distribute the film without the permission of Warner Bros. Pictures and Amblin Entertainment, and mentioned how they would like to have a special screening of the rough cut. Despite being unable to show the footage to the public, the website has started to upload information along with some still images from the VHS.

== Merchandising ==
=== Toys and collectibles ===
With its commercial themes, particularly the cuteness of the character Gizmo, Gremlins became the center of considerable merchandising. Due to this, it became part of a rising trend in film, which had received a boost from Spielberg's E.T. the Extra-Terrestrial. Manufacturers including LJN produced versions of Gizmo as dolls or stuffed animals, the latter of which became a popular high-demand toy during the holiday season of 1984. Both Gizmo and the gremlins were mass-produced as action figures, and Topps printed trading cards based upon the film.

An interactive Gizmo Furby Friends toy was released in 1999.

A product placement deal with fast food chain Hardee's also led to a series of five book-and-cassette/45 records adaptations of the film's story. Starting in the early 2000s, companies such as Jun Planning and the National Entertainment Collectibles Association produced all-new Gremlins toys and collectibles. In 2017 Trick or Treat Studios began producing official Gremlins life-size puppets of Stripe and Gizmo. In May 2019, NECA unveiled their Christmas 2019 collectible, which features two Gremlins singing carols.

A brick built Lego version of Gizmo was released in October 2025.

=== Books ===
The screenplay was adapted into a novelization by George Gipe, published by Avon Books in June 1984. The novel offered an origin for mogwai and gremlins as a prologue. Supposedly, mogwai were created as gentle, contemplative creatures by a scientist on an alien world. However, it was discovered their physiology was unstable. The result was only 1 in 10,000 mogwai would retain their sweet, loving demeanor. The rest would change into creatures the novel referred to as "mischievous". The minority mogwai (the 1 in 10,000) are immortal by human standards, though Gizmo explains to Stripe if he were to undergo the transformation himself, he would become like the others, "short lived and violent". This origin is unique to the novel but is referred to in the novelization of Gremlins 2 by David Bischoff. No definitive origin for mogwai or gremlins is given in either Gremlins film. The novelization contains a subplot that was cut from the original film, where the National Guard plans to neutralize the gremlins with fire hoses.

A comic book adaptation was published by Western Publishing in 1984.

=== Video games ===
==== Action-oriented video games ====
Several officially licensed video games based on the film have been produced. One of the first was Gremlins, released by Atari, Inc. for their 2600 console.

Atari, Inc. released a completely different game—also called Gremlins—for the Atari 5200 console and the Apple II, Commodore 64 and IBM PC compatible computers. Although the Atari 5200 version went to manufacturing in 1984, the turmoil surrounding Jack Tramiel's takeover of Atari's consumer business resulted in it not being released until 1986.

In the 2000s, more games were released; Gremlins: Unleashed! was released on Game Boy Color in 2001. The game was about Gizmo trying to catch Stripe and thirty other gremlins, while the gremlins also try to turn Gizmo into a gremlin. Both Gizmo and Stripe are playable characters in the game.

In 2011 NECA, published a Gremlins game for the Wii and Nintendo DS called Gremlins Gizmo. This was developed by Pipeworks Software and was released on November 18, 2011.

A Gremlins Team Pack was released for Lego Dimensions on November 18, 2016. The pack includes minifigures of Gizmo and Stripe, a constructible Polaroid camera and radio-controlled car and grants access to an Adventure World and Battle Arena based on the franchise. Howie Mandel and Frank Welker reprise their respective roles as Gizmo and Stripe. In the platform fighter MultiVersus, Gizmo and Stripe are playable characters, along with a map based on the theater shown in the film.

==== Gremlins: The Adventure ====
At the time of the film's release, an interactive fiction game based on scenes from the film, entitled Gremlins: The Adventure (1985), was released for various home computers, including the Acorn Electron, the BBC Micro, the Commodore 64 and the ZX Spectrum. The game was written by Brian Howarth for Adventure Soft and was text-based, with full-color illustrations on some formats.

=== Miscellaneous ===
In addition to this, Gremlins brand breakfast cereal was produced by Ralston concurrent to and for a few years after the first film was released in 1984. The front of the cereal box featured Gizmo, and inside were decals of the malevolent gremlins, including Stripe.

== Sequels and animated prequel series ==
After the commercial success it was followed by a sequel, Gremlins 2: The New Batch in 1990. The film was not as successful as the first, and further films were not planned.

In January 2013, Vulture reported that Warner Bros. was negotiating with Amblin Entertainment to reboot the Gremlins franchise. Seth Grahame-Smith was selected to produce, alongside David Katzenberg. In January 2015, Grahame-Smith stated that the project has been put on hold. In November 2015, Zach Galligan confirmed that the third film would be a sequel and not a reboot. In a December 2016 interview with Bleeding Cool, Galligan again spoke about a third film saying that "Warner Bros. definitely wants it, Chris Columbus wants to do it because he'd like to undo the Gremlins 2 thing as he wasn't thrilled with it, and Spielberg wants to." He claimed Gremlins 3 is being written by Carl Ellsworth. In an interview with /Film in 2017, a script was written by Chris Columbus. His script explored the idea that has been on the fan's mind for a long time: "if all the gremlins come from getting Gizmo wet and feeding his mogwai offspring after midnight, should Gizmo be eliminated?" He described his script as "twisted and dark". In November 2020, Columbus stated that CGI would not be used for the gremlins and that traditional puppets and animatronics would continue to be used.

In 2019, Warner Bros. successfully gained registered trademark of the name and the franchise. That same year, the studio's parent company WarnerMedia greenlit an animated prequel series based on the property for its streaming service, Max. The first season, subtitled Secrets of the Mogwai, premiered on May 23, 2023. The series was renewed for a second season, subtitled The Wild Batch, which was released on October 3, 2024.

In January 2025, it was reported by Deadline that Warner Bros. was developing a third Gremlins movie written by Chris Columbus who also was writing a sequel to The Goonies. Nothing official has been confirmed by Warner Bros. about a sequel for either film being planned. By November of that year, a sequel was announced with Columbus and Spielberg returning as director and executive producer respectively and would be originally set to be released on November 19, 2027. However, in September 2026, the film was delayed to October 6, 2028. It was also announced that Hannah Marks was writing a new draft of the screenplay alongside Columbus.

== Legacy ==
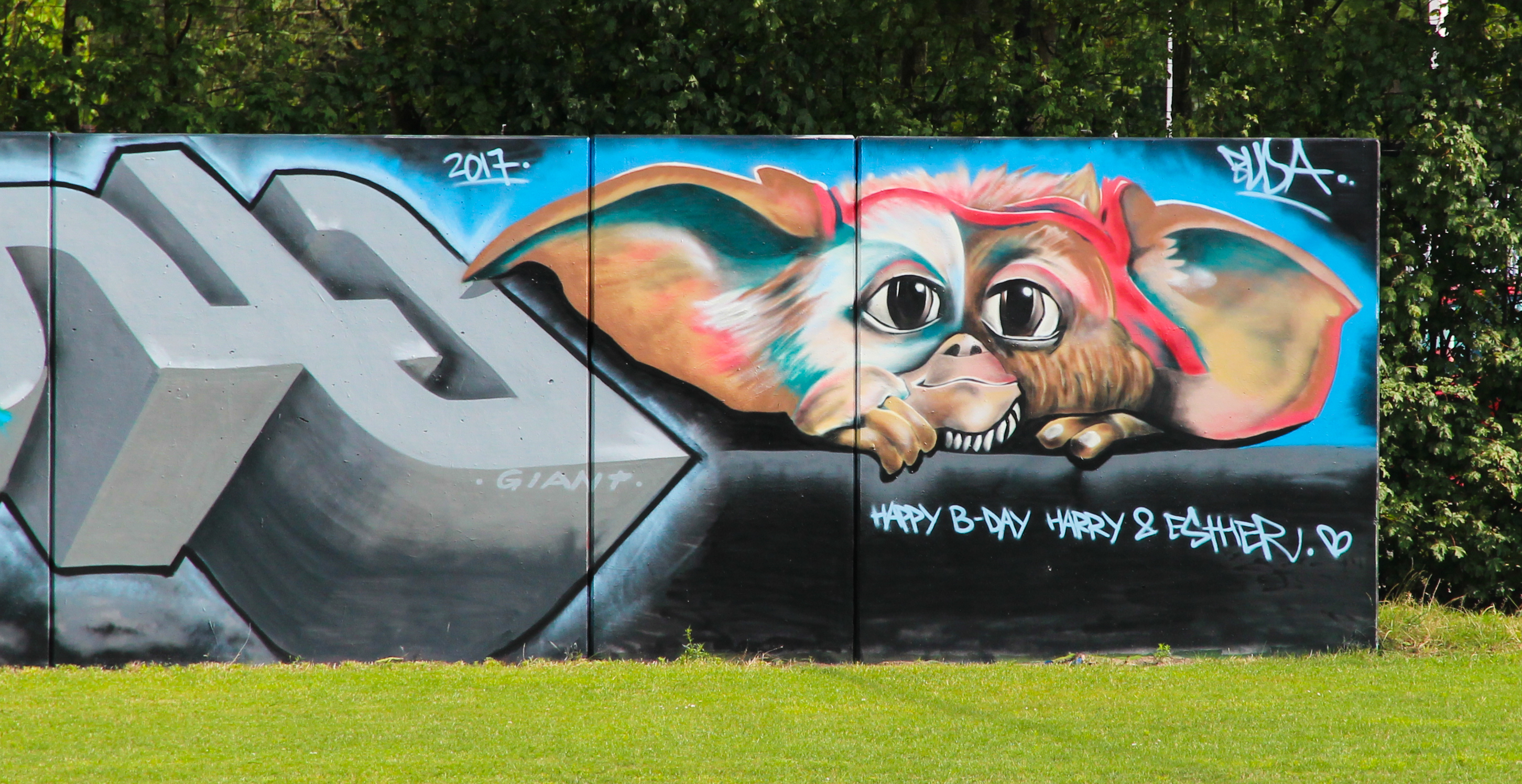
Mogwai depicted in street art (Oss, Netherlands)

The film not only spawned the sequel (another sequel is scheduled for an October 2028 release) and an advertisement for British Telecom, but is believed to have been the inspiration for several unrelated films about small monsters. These include Ghoulies, Troll, Hobgoblins and Munchies.

In music, the Scottish post-rock band Mogwai is named after the film's creatures: as for the reason why the band chose this as their name, their guitarist, Stuart Braithwaite, has stated that "it has no significant meaning and we always intended on getting a better one, but like a lot of other things we never got round to it". Welsh singer and songwriter Rod Thomas performs under the name Bright Light Bright Light, which is a direct quote from the film.

On November 18, 2016, both Gizmo and Stripe made appearances in Lego Dimensions as playable characters in their own Team Pack. Many of the other in-game playable characters, such as Supergirl, acknowledge the duo's rules and they each have their own unique abilities and weaponry; Gizmo having a radio-controlled car inspired by the toy car he piloted in the film's climax and Stripe having a camera-like gadget inspired by the ones manufactured by Polaroid Corporation, one of which Kate Beringer armed herself with during the gremlins' attack on Dorry's Tavern. Both Mandel and Welker returned to reprise their respective roles.

In 2017, some gremlins were featured in the animated film The Lego Batman Movie, with its director, Chris McKay, explaining his love for the characters. These gremlins were among numerous villains from outside of the Batman franchise playing a role in the film, with many of the added antagonists owned by Warner Bros.

In February 2021, a Mountain Dew Zero Sugar ad featuring Zach Galligan as Billy Peltzer and Gizmo was released, which also revealed that Billy has a daughter.

Also in 2021, a trio of Gremlins including Stripe appear in Space Jam: A New Legacy. They were shown running towards the site of the basketball game between the Tune Squad and the Goon Squad and can be seen cheering from on top of the blue Bronto-Crane from The Flintstones.

Both Gizmo and Stripe appear as playable characters in the 2022 fighting game MultiVersus, voiced by Daniel Ross.

Both Gizmo and the sequel's Brain Gremlin appear in the Teen Titans Go! episode, "Warner Bros. 100th Anniversary" as supporting characters.

Stripe appears as a finished pixel art puzzle solution in the Picross game series for the Nintendo Switch, Found in Picross S4 as Puzzle P042.

== See also ==
- Warner Bros. Classics & Great Gremlins Adventure (a.k.a. Gremlins Invasion), two defunct amusement rides themed after the film
- List of holiday horror films
- List of Christmas films

== Bibliography ==
- Bilstein, Roger E. (2001). Flight in America: From the Wrights to the Astronauts. Baltimore: Johns Hopkins University Press. ISBN 0-8018-6685-5.
- Maltin, Leonard (2001). Leonard Maltin's 2002 Movie & Video Guide. A Signet Book.
- Sale, Kirkpatrick. Rebels Against the Future. Quartet Books.
