= The Two Coreys =

Actors Corey Feldman and Corey Haim

The Two Coreys (also known as The Coreys) are American actor Corey Feldman (born 1971) and Canadian actor Corey Haim (1971–2010), who were often paired.

Feldman and Haim were child actors during the 1980s; the two were close friends. Both of them grew up in Jewish families and had a passing interest in Numerology. They almost even share the same lucky number – Feldman’s is 22, while Haim wore 222 on a chain around his neck. The Two Coreys appeared in a total of nine films together, including The Lost Boys (1987).

Becoming a brand, The Two Coreys achieved mainstream fame and notoriety as teen idols, but each later experienced a career downturn due to drug use.

The Two Coreys, a reality show about the two actors, aired on the A&E Network from 2007 to 2008.

Following a long battle with drug addiction, Haim died of pneumonia in 2010.

In 2020, Feldman released My Truth: The Rape of 2 Coreys. The documentary explores the friendship between The Two Coreys and asserts that both were sexually abused as children in the entertainment industry.

Feldman had often called Haim his "best friend", but he did not attend Haim's funeral because he could not afford to travel by plane to Canada.

In 2025, Feldman alleged that Haim had molested him. Feldman also stated that Haim informed him that Charlie Sheen told him that such behavior "was OK." Feldman later issued a statement through his attorneys recanting this claim.

== Common filmography ==
- The Lost Boys (1987)
- License to Drive (1988)
- Dream a Little Dream (1989)
- Blown Away (1993)
- National Lampoon's Last Resort (1994)
- Dream a Little Dream 2 (1995)
- Busted (1996)
- Big Wolf on Campus (TV series) (Haim in 2000, Feldman in 2002) (cameo)
- Dickie Roberts: Former Child Star (2003) (cameo)
- Robot Chicken (2006) (Episode 2.2, "Federated Resources")
- The Two Coreys (2007–2008) (TV series)
- Lost Boys: The Tribe (2008)
