= The Zombie King =

- The Zombie King Poster
- Directed by: Aidan Belizaire
- Screenplay by: George McCluskey
- Story by: Jennifer Chippindale; Rebecca-Clare Evans
- Produced by: Jennifer Chippindale; Rebecca-Clare Evans
- Starring: Edward Furlong; Corey Feldman
- Cinematography: Ismael Issa Lopez
- Edited by: Andrew McKee
- Music by: Andrew Phillips
- Production company: Northern Girl Productions
- Release date: April 2013 (Germany)
- Running time: 85 minutes
- Country: United Kingdom
- Language: English

The Zombie King is a British horror comedy film directed by Aidan Belizaire and starring Edward Furlong and Corey Feldman. The film is based on a story by Jennifer Chippindale and Rebecca-Clare Evans.

== Plot ==
Samuel Peters, once an ordinary man, dabbles in the laws of voodoo to bring his wife back from the grave. He soon encounters the god of malevolence, Kalfu, and makes a pact with him to destroy the underworld and bring chaos to earth. In return, he will become the Zombie King and walk the earth for eternity with his late wife. But as the growing horde of zombies begins to wipe out a countryside town, the government creates a perimeter around the town and employs a shoot-on-sight policy. Trapped within the town, the locals, an unlikely bunch of misfits, must fight for their lives and unite in order to survive.

== Cast ==
- Edward Furlong as Samuel Peters / The Zombie King
- Corey Feldman as Kalfu
- George McCluskey as Ed Wallace
- David McClelland as Munch
- Michael Gamarano as Boris
- Seb Castang as Simo
- Rebecca-Clare Evans as Danny
- Jennifer Chippindale as Tara
- Jon Campling as Father Lawrence
- Timothy Owen as Neville
- Anabel Barston as Tabitha
- Jane Foufas as Vera
- Leo Horsfield as Scott
- Sebastian Street as Doctor Carter
- Tanya Kararina as Samuel Peters' Wife
- Forbes KB as Gravedigger

== Production ==
The film went into production in the U.K. on 20 November 2011 and was shot over 21 days.

== Release ==
McCluskey originally planned a release for the film in December 2012. In 2013, the film was released on DVD in Germany in April, and Japan in May. In July 2013, Carousel Media announced it was authoring the DVD.
