= Lala Sloatman =

American model, actress and costumer

- Occupation: Actress
- Spouse: Chris Robinson (m. 1996; div. 1998)
- Children: 1

Lala Sloatman is an American actress. She appeared in the films Watchers (1988) and Dream a Little Dream (1989), alongside her then-boyfriend Corey Haim.

== Career ==
In the 1980s, Sloatman appeared in the films Watchers (1988) and Dream a Little Dream (1989), alongside her then-boyfriend Corey Haim. Haim personally suggested her for the lead in a third movie, Prayer of the Rollerboys (1991), but the part went to Patricia Arquette. A year later, Sloatman likewise auditioned for the title role in Buffy the Vampire Slayer but lost out to Kristy Swanson.

Sloatman's additional movie work includes Bunny Bunny Bunny (a short film which co-starred Moon Zappa and Kyle Richards), Pump Up the Volume (1990), Dragon: The Bruce Lee Story (1993, as Lauren Holly's college roommate), Buy One, Get One Free* (1996), Manfast (2003), Net Games (2003, as a sexy serial killer) and Sofia Coppola's Somewhere (2010).

== Personal life ==
Sloatman dated Haim in the late 1980s and C. Thomas Howell in the early 1990s. She has one daughter. Sloatman was married to Chris Robinson, the lead singer of The Black Crowes, from 1996 to 1998.

== Filmography ==
Year	Title	Role	Notes
1988	Tequila Sunrise	Sin Sister #2 (cameo role)	Credited as Lala
1988	Watchers	Tracey	Credited as Lala
1989	Dream a Little Dream	Shelley	Credited as Lala
1990	Joe Versus the Volcano	Blond Waitress in Chinese restaurant (cameo role)	Credited as Lala
1990	The Adventures of Ford Fairlane	Sorority Girl (cameo role)	Credited as Lala
1990	Pump Up the Volume	Janie	
1991	L.A. Story	Ariel's lesbian girlfriend	Scenes deleted
1993	Dragon: The Bruce Lee Story	Sherry Schnell	
1993	Amityville: A New Generation	Llanie	Credited as Lala; Direct-to-video release
1994	Cityscrapes: Los Angeles	Angel	
1996	Buy One, Get One Free*	Sophie (voice)	Alternative title: Fix and Flinch
2003	Pauly Shore Is Dead	Hooker in Loft	
2003	Net Games	Angel	Alternative title: Net G@mes
2003	Manfast	Taylor/Narrator	Alternative title: Holding Out
2010	Somewhere	Layla	
