= Timothy Haskell (director) =

American theater director

Timothy Haskell is an American theater director and immersive haunted house creator.

== Director ==
In 2003, Haskell directed an Off-Broadway stage parody of the Patrick Swayze film Road House starring Taimak from The Last Dragon in the Swayze role. In 2004, he directed both the Off-Broadway plays Corporate Rock and I Love Paris. In 2005, he directed Fatal Attraction: A Greek Tragedy starring Corey Feldman in the Michael Douglas role. In 2015, Haskell directed Smile Off-Off Broadway. In 2022, Haskell co-wrote and directed The Rise and Fall, Then Brief and Modest Rise Followed By A Relative Fall Of… Jean Claude Van Damme As Gleaned by a Single Reading of His Wikipedia Page Months Earlier, which received a strongly positive review from Elisabeth Vincentelli in the New York Times.

== Psycho Clan ==
In 2002, Haskell co-founded Psycho Clan which has produced the immersive Nightmare Haunted House in New York City with varying annual themes. In 2007, Haskell created Nightmare: Ghost Stories. In 2011, Haskell created Nightmare: Z-Day, a zombie-themed haunted house in The Bronx as well as Nightmare: Fairy Tales on the Lower East Side. In 2023, Psycho Clan produced Nightmare Dollhouse on the Lower East Side.
