= Angelic 2 the Core =

Studio album by Corey Feldman
- Released: June 22, 2016
- Recorded: 2006–2016
- Genres: Dance-pop; hip hop; rock
- Length: 94:57
- Label: CiFi
- Producer: Corey Feldman

Singles from Angelic 2 the Core
- 1. "Go 4 It / Everybody" Released: April 22, 2017

Angelic 2 the Core is the third solo studio album by American actor and singer Corey Feldman, self-released on June 22, 2016, by his label CiFi Records. It includes Feldman's first collaboration with musician Fred Durst, who was featured on the album's song "Seamless".

== Background ==
=== Production ===
Angelic 2 the Core is a concept album consisting of two discs; Angelic Funkadelic (2 Dance), containing electronic dance music influences, is dedicated to Michael Jackson, whereas Angelic Rockadelic (2 Rock), containing mostly rock music influences, is dedicated to Corey Haim. The album prominently features artists including Snoop Dogg, Fred Durst, and Kurupt.

Feldman has not elaborated on the process of and meaning of the songs in the album but has described the album as having a theme of "...good versus evil, heaven versus hell, that sort of thing" in a television appearance on NBC's Today in September 2016. In a 2016 Rolling Stone interview, Feldman intended to challenge his status as a teen star by making a concept album, stating "I like giving people what they least expect". In a MovieWeb interview, Feldman stated "[Angelic 2 the Core] is a concept album in the sense that it does ties together, it does have a fluidity to it. And it does definitely take you on a journey that is connected." Describing the process of the album, numerous outlets have stated the album was "a decade in the making".

The album was funded primarily through Indiegogo.

== Release and reception ==
Angelic 2 the Core was released on CD and digital platforms on June 22, 2016, by Feldman's label CiFi Records. Feldman supported the album with a tour with his backing band Corey's Angels, which included two appearances and two songs, "Go 4 It" with rapper Doc Ice taking Snoop Dogg's place, and "Take a Stand", on Today; Feldman's performances on Today attracted significant attention from prominent media outlets. A song from the album, "Go 4 It" was released as a limited edition vinyl for Record Store Day 2017.

His performances on Today and the album received mostly negative and sympathetic reviews, owing to its overall presentation and quality of the album being "bizarre" and "weird", and Feldman's difficulties in his personal life.

Nathan Rabin, writing for The A.V. Club, described the album as a "goddamned bizarre piece of work" but praised Feldman for "being creative, expressing himself and releasing a project that is deeply personal, if also deeply insane."; Rabin labeled and rated the album as a "Secret Success". Similarly, Mark Hinson praised Feldman's confidence in addition to dismissing his album, writing in the Tallahassee Democrat, "At least he's a misguided Goonie with guts." Chloe Bryan for Mashable described Feldman's performance on Today as "if Criss Angel's life became a musical". Gavin Edwards in Rolling Stone sarcastically remarked on the album: "When you are succumbing to your demons and falling into a personal hell, the only route to salvation comes through hot blondes in white lingerie". Justin Ivey in XXL magazine remarked that Feldman's collaboration with Snoop Dogg for "Go 4 It" is unusual and one of the "stranger things".

Numerous musicians supported Feldman after the negative reception, including Pink, Miley Cyrus, and Kesha, who stated on her Instagram post, "It's easy to sit at a computer and talk shit. It's not easy to perform in front of millions. Keep your head up. Normal is boring." Feldman strongly defended his musicianship and his "Go 4 It" performance from Today, responding "It was a song, O.K.? It wasn't that weird. I'm sorry if it's not good enough for you, but you don't have to beat us up."

== Track listing ==
Angelic Funkadelic (2 Dance) track listing
No.	Title	Writer(s)	Length
1.	"Ascension Millennium"	Corey Feldman, Rick Dixon	5:37
2.	"Lovin' Lies"	Feldman	3:30
3.	"Angelic 2 the Core"	Feldman, Dixon, Thomas Van Musser	3:37
4.	"4Bidin Attraction" (featuring Kaya Jones)	Feldman, Chrystal Nerhia	4:03
5.	"Crossed the Line" (featuring Jon Carin and Nina Kristin)	Feldman, Jon Carin	4:03
6.	"Bad People"	Feldman, Andrew Bojanic, Liz Hooper	4:29
7.	"Duh!"	Feldman	3:45
8.	"Everybody" (featuring Doc Ice)	Feldman, Michael DeBarge, David Louis Gardia, Van Musser, Fredrick Reeves, Melissa B, Tami Arrendell	3:42
9.	"Lickety Splickety" (featuring Kurupt)	Feldman, Kurupt	4:14
10.	"Go 4 It" (featuring Snoop Dogg)	Feldman, Calvin Broadus, Mike Gonsolin, Nicholas Nitolli	3:20
11.	"Test 1" (featuring S.B. and Scott Page)	Feldman, Scott Page, Demario McDow	5:53

Angelic Rockadelic (2 Rock) track listing
No.	Title	Writer(s)	Length
1.	"Seamless" (featuring Fred Durst)	Feldman, Fred Durst, Page	5:25
2.	"Wanna Break Free"	Feldman, Pharoa Barret	2:59
3.	"Negativity"	Feldman	3:47
4.	"Ya Got Me"	Feldman, Bojanic, Hooper	2:48
5.	"Baby Blue Eyes"	Feldman	4:54
6.	"4 My Love"	Feldman, Bojanic, Hooper	4:52
7.	"We Wanted Change"	Feldman	2:57
8.	"Take a Stand"	Feldman, David Dunn	5:00
9.	"Remember 222 (Corey's Song)"	Feldman, Page	4:20
10.	"Mercy" (featuring B Howard)	Feldman, B Howard	5:13
11.	"Working Class Hero"	John Lennon	5:12
12.	"Hidden Track"	Feldman	1:17
Total length:			94:57

== Personnel ==
Credits per AllMusic.

- Corey Feldman – lead vocals, all instruments, producer
- Gregg Sartiano – guitars, bass
- Scott Page – guitars, saxophone
- Tommy D. Daugherty – recording engineer

Guest musicians

- Snoop Dogg – featured artist in "Go 4 It"
- Fred Durst – featured artist in "Seamless"
- Kurupt – featured artist in "Lickity Splickity"
- Doc Ice – featured artist in "Everybody"
- Jon Carin – featured artist in "Crossed the Line"
- Kaya Jones – featured artist in "4Bidin Attraction"
- B Howard – featured artist in "Mercy"

== See also ==
- List of music considered the worst
