= My Truth: The Rape of 2 Coreys =

2020 American documentary film

(My) Truth: The Rape of 2 Coreys
- Release poster
- Directed by: Brian Herzlinger
- Produced by: Corey Feldman; Arthur Jameson
- Starring: Corey Feldman; Ricky Garcia; Corey Haim (archival footage); Kristoff St. John
- Cinematography: Trey Howser
- Edited by: Elliot Gaynon
- Music by: Mj Mynarski
- Production company: Truth 4222 Productions
- Release date: March 9, 2020
- Running time: 85 minutes
- Country: United States
- Language: English

My Truth: The Rape of 2 Coreys is a 2020 American documentary film directed by Brian Herzlinger and produced by Corey Feldman and Arthur Jameson. Feldman also stars in the film. The film showcases allegations that Feldman and fellow actor Corey Haim were sexually abused as young children and adolescents by several men connected to the entertainment industry.

== Background ==
Feldman and Haim were child actors during the 1980s; the two were close friends and were referred to as "The Two Coreys". Feldman and Haim appeared in a total of nine films together. Following a long battle with drug addiction, Haim died of pneumonia in 2010.

== Synopsis ==
The film begins with a recording of the 9-1-1 call in which Corey Haim's mother states that she had found him unresponsive.

The documentary explores the friendship between Haim and Feldman and asserts that both were sexually abused as children in the industry. Feldman names actor Charlie Sheen, registered sex offender Marty Weiss, convicted child molester Jon Grissom, Feldman asserts that Sheen raped Haim during the filming of the 1986 film Lucas. Haim was 13 years of age during the filming of Lucas, while Sheen was 19.

Feldman also claims that a "wolfpack" group is after him and working to discredit him. Feldman states that he suspects Judy Haim, Corey Haim's mother, of fronting the group.

Child singer Ricky Garcia also discusses the sexual abuse he experienced at the hands of his manager, Joby Harte.

== Release ==
The film premiered in Los Angeles on March 9, 2020. The film was intentionally released on the eve of the ten-year anniversary of Corey Haim's death.

The Los Angeles Times story byline read: "Inside Corey Feldman's wild screening of his sexual abuse film as it went off the rails". The film was said to have been streamed simultaneously for the world premiere. A short time into the screening, Feldman stopped the film and took to the stage, claiming he was having technical issues with the online stream. Many believed that the technical disruption was a hoax; however, "the server showing the movie came under attack from an unknown source". After the interruption, the film screening resumed.

Following the release, Feldman claimed that he was in danger and left the country.

== Reaction ==
Haim's mother Judy and sister Cari disputed the allegations in the documentary. On March 10, 2020, Rolling Stone staff reporter Tim Chan reported, "Some will question whether the story of Haim's alleged rape is appropriate for Feldman to tell given a grieving mother's vehement opposition to the film and the fact that we've never actually heard Haim comment on the allegations himself".

Charlie Sheen strongly denied the allegations made against him in the film, issuing a statement:

In my nearly 35 years as a celebrated entertainer, I have been nothing shy of a forthright, noble and valiant courier of the truth. Consistently admitting and owning a laundry list of shortcomings, wrongdoings and indiscretions this traveler hath traveled—however, every man has a breaking point. These radically groundless and unfounded allegations end now. I now take a passionate stand against those who wish to even entertain the sick and twisted lies against me, GAME OVER.
