= Brian Herzlinger =

American film director

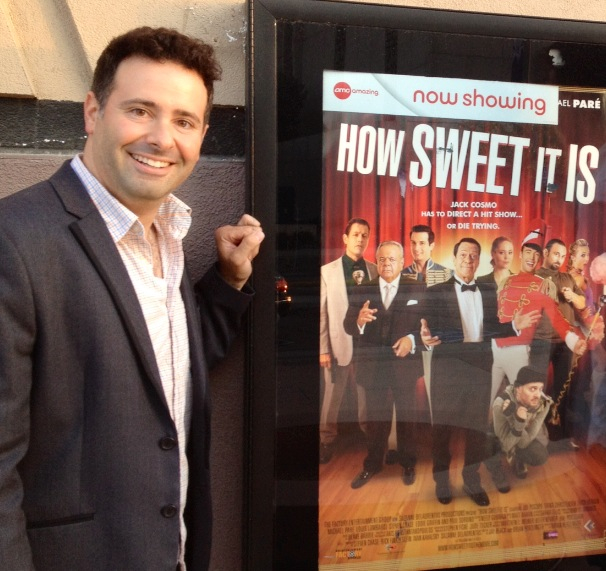
- Herzlinger at Sweet screening
- Born: February 19, 1976 (age 49); Brooklyn, New York, U.S.
- Occupation: Film director
- Years active: 1997–present
- Spouse: Megan Henry Herzlinger (m. 2013)
- Children: 3

Brian Scott Herzlinger (born February 19, 1976, Brooklyn, New York) is an American film director who directed and starred in My Date with Drew, a documentary released in 2005. Herzlinger graduated from Ithaca College (NY) with a film degree in 1997.

== Early years ==
Herzlinger grew up in Evesham Township, New Jersey, where he attended Cherokee High School, graduating in 1994 as the prom king.

In 1997, he graduated from Ithaca College with a BS in Cinema & Photography. He had written and directed a short, student film called The Film Contest shot on 16mm film. After moving to Los Angeles, Herzlinger directed more short films, including Malicious Intent. He worked at DreamWorks and MGM and also as a Production Assistant on several commercials and music videos. Afterwards, he worked for two years as a Producer's P.A. on the CBS medical drama Chicago Hope, and worked his way up to Executive Producer Bill D'Elia's assistant on the David E. Kelley landmark series Ally McBeal. After his first feature My Date With Drew, Herzlinger began a three-year stint as an on-air special correspondent for The Tonight Show with Jay Leno. Simultaneously, he directed the romantic comedy Baby on Board, starring Heather Graham, Jerry O'Connell, John Corbett and Lara Flynn Boyle which hit theatres nationwide in 2009.

Herzlinger's love for film began at a young age with his first viewing of the film E.T.: The Extra-Terrestrial, said the director in an interview for The Film That Changed My Life by Robert K. Elder.

I think it gave us permission to believe, and I’ll tell you right now, one of my biggest things as a person, as a filmmaker, is being able to believe. If I didn’t have that and didn’t have that ability, I would have failed at this business.

== Recent years ==
Herzlinger currently lives in Malibu, California and works as a film director and writer.

In 2010, Summit Entertainment hired Black and Herzlinger to re-write their $50 million action comedy Mental. In 2011, Herzlinger directed the feature Brother White (starring Bruce Davison and Ray Wise) as well as the television pilot for B&B Media's Today’s Tiaras.

In 2012, Herzlinger served as host for Laugh Factor, a CW pilot for the Wayans Brothers, described as The Voice for stand-up comedy. Also in 2012, Herzlinger the comedy musical How Sweet It Is (starring Paul Sorvino and Joe Piscopo), which was co-written by Jay Black & Herzlinger, and released in select theatres nationwide on May 10, 2013. That same year, he directed the family holiday film Christmas Angel (starring Kevin Sorbo and Della Reese), which became the highest-rated TV movie of 2012 for the GMC network with over 3 million viewers.

In 2013, he directed the feature film Finding Normal. He produced, directed, and co-wrote the TV pilot Paulie (starring Paul Sorvino and Janeane Garofalo).

In 2014, Herzlinger and Black wrote the cancer drama Meet My Valentine. He directed the film for Marvista Entertainment which was released on Valentine's Day 2015, and is currently on Netflix. In 2015, the duo wrote the action film, The Bus Driver, which Herzlinger also directed. That year, he also directed the feature drama The Perfect Daughter starring Parker Stevenson and Meredith Salenger. He co-wrote and directed the Christmas film Love Always, Santa and directed the series pilot Confessions of a Hollywood Bartender.

In 2016, Herzlinger directed the feature romantic comedy Love's Last Resort, which turned out to be the late Alan Thicke's last film; Hush Little Baby, a thriller starring Erin Cahill; and the Pureflix original series pilot Hitting The Breaks.

In 2017, Herzlinger directed the romantic drama Runaway Romance starring Tatum O'Neal. In 2019, he directed his second documentary, My Truth: The Rape of 2 Coreys. The film explores actor Corey Feldman's allegations sexual abuse as a child by prominent Hollywood figures.

== Filmography ==
Films directed
Year	Film	Other notes
1997	The Film Contest	Short film
1999	Malicious Intent	Short film
2002	Krutch	Short film
2005	My Date with Drew	Vail Film Festival Festival Award; US Comedy Arts Festival Audience Award; Gen Art Film Festival Audience Award; Locarno International Film Festival Critics Week Award; Sonoma Valley Film Festival Audience Award; Sonoma Valley Film Festival Jury Award; Sonoma Valley Film Festival Special Award
2009	Baby on Board	
2011	Brother White	TV movie
2012	Christmas Angel	TV movie
2013	How Sweet It Is	Feature film
2013	Finding Normal	TV movie
2013	Paulie	Completed pilot
2014	The Bus Driver	Feature film
2014	Meet My Valentine	Feature film
2015	The Perfect Daughter	Feature film
2015	Confessions of a Hollywood Bartender	Series pilot
2016	Love Always, Santa	Feature film
2016	Love's Last Resort	Feature film
2016	Hush Little Baby	Feature film
2016	Hitting the Breaks	Series pilot + 2 episodes
2017	Runaway Romance	Feature film
2020	My Truth: The Rape of 2 Coreys	Documentary film
2021	The Holiday Fixup	Feature film
