= Amityville: A New Generation =

1993 film by John Murlowski

- Promotional poster
- Directed by: John Murlowski
- Written by: Christopher DeFaria; Antonio M. Toro
- Produced by: Barry Bernardi; Steve White; Christopher DeFaria
- Starring: Ross Partridge; Julia Nickson-Soul; Lala Sloatman; David Naughton; Richard Roundtree; Terry O'Quinn
- Cinematography: Wally Pfister
- Edited by: Rick Finney
- Music by: Daniel Licht
- Distributed by: Republic Pictures
- Release date: September 29, 1993
- Running time: 91 minutes
- Country: United States
- Language: English
- Budget: $1.5 million (estimated)

Amityville: A New Generation is a 1993 American direct-to-video supernatural horror film directed by John Murlowski. It is the seventh film based on The Amityville Horror, and stars Ross Partridge, Julia Nickson-Soul, Lala Sloatman, David Naughton, Richard Roundtree, and Terry O'Quinn.

== Plot ==
Before the DeFeos moved into 112 Ocean Avenue in Amityville, New York, the house was occupied by the Bronners. In 1966, the Bronner family's eldest son, Franklin, killed his parents and two siblings during Thanksgiving dinner. Franklin, who had a long history of mental illness, claimed to have committed the familicide at the behest of otherworldly forces that resided within the house, and was committed to Danamore State Hospital. Years later, Franklin's wife and their young son, Keyes Terry, visited him. Despite being sedated, Franklin killed his wife in front of Keyes. Keyes repressed the memory of visiting Danamore, and never received any kind of notification about his father being discharged from it in 1986.

In 1993, Keyes, now a photographer, lives in an inner city boarding house with his girlfriend, Llanie. The boarding house is owned by Dick Cutler, and its other tenants include a painter named Suki, and a sculptor named Pauli. Franklin tracks down Keyes, and gives him a mirror that he took from the house in Amityville. The mirror is demonic, and it kills Suki and her ex-boyfriend, Raymond. After Franklin is found dead, Keyes begins looking into his past, and realizes that Franklin was his father after visiting Danamore.

The demon in the mirror assumes Suki's form to kill Dick, and then begins tormenting Keyes by turning into Franklin. Keyes gets sucked into the mirror, which brings him to a Hellish version of Danamore where he encounters undead versions of Raymond, Suki, Dick, and Franklin. The demon then returns Keyes to the real world, and makes it clear that it wants Keyes to reenact the massacre of the Bronner family by shooting Llanie, Pauli, and Dick's wife Janet at the boarding house's Thanksgiving art show. Keyes resists the demon's influence and breaks the mirror, prompting his friend Detective Clark to sardonically quip, "Seven years bad luck."

== Cast ==
- Ross Partridge as Keyes Terry
  - Jon Paul Steuer as Young Keyes Terry
- Julia Nickson-Soul as Suki
- Lala Sloatman as Llanie
- David Naughton as Dick Cutler
- Barbara Howard as Janet Cutler
- Jack Orend as Franklin Bronner
- Richard Roundtree as Pauli
- Terry O'Quinn as Detective Clark
- Robert Rusler as Ray
- Lin Shaye as Nurse Turner
- Karl Johnson as Cafe Owner
- Ralph Ahn as Mr. Kim
- Tom Wright as Morgue Attendant
- Bob Jennings as Rookie Cop
- Claudia Gold as Mrs. Bronner
- Bob Harvey as Orderly
- Ken Bolognese as Critic
- Abbe Rowlins as Academic
- Joseph Schuster as Young Man
- J.P. Stevens as Teen
- Kim Anderson as Critic
- Claudia Gold as Critic

== Release ==
The film was released direct to video in 1993 by Republic Pictures Home Video in R-rated and unrated versions. Lionsgate Home Entertainment (under license from FremantleMedia North America) has released this film to DVD in July 2005. In 2019, Vinegar Syndrome (under license from Multicom Entertainment Group) released the film on Blu-ray in the US which was included in the boxset "Amityville: The Cursed Collection". In 2022, the film was released on Blu-ray in the UK courtesy of Screenbound Pictures Ltd.
