= Dream Machine (film) =

1991 film

- VHS cover
- Directed by: Lyman Dayton
- Written by: Eric Hendershot
- Produced by: Lyman Dayton; Eric R. Epperson; Michael Wuergler
- Starring: Corey Haim; Brittney Lewis; Randall England; Tracy Fraim; Evan Richards
- Cinematography: T.C. Christensen
- Edited by: Stephen L. Johnson
- Music by: Lex de Azevedo
- Production company: EDS Productions
- Distributed by: International Creative Exchange
- Release date: November 13, 1991
- Running time: 86 minutes
- Country: United States
- Language: English

Dream Machine is a 1991 American comedy thriller film, starring Corey Haim, Brittney Lewis and Randall England. The screenplay was written by Eric Hendershot and based on the old urban legend of a wife selling off a Porsche for a suspiciously low price to get revenge on a cheating husband. The film was released direct-to-video in 1991.

== Plot ==
A suspicious Mrs. Chamberlain hires a private detective to spy on her husband. When she receives the confirmation later that night that her husband is with another woman, she proceeds to location.

While she is on the way, Lance Harper murders the wealthy woman's husband, Jack Chamberlain, who Harper was in various trouble with at the time. The body is stored in the trunk of his Porsche. Upon the arrival of Chamberlain's wife, who came to take back the Porsche, Harper disappears into the night, as Mrs. Chamberlain drives away, not knowing her cheating husband has been murdered and is in under the hood of the car she is driving.

College student Barry Davis is doing his rounds as a piano tuner for his parents' business while they are on vacation, when his dreams of fast cars become a reality as he is given a metallic grey 1983 Porsche 911 SC convertible for free by Mrs. Chamberlain who wants to get even with her cheating husband, whom she had originally purchased it for.

Davis, who cannot believe his luck, does not realise that Jack Chamberlain's corpse is under the hood of his dream car. While Davis is evading fraternity boys and pursuing his dream girl, he becomes mixed up in the homicide as Lance Harper tracks him down by phoning every 'Barry Davis' in the phone book and asking 'Is this Barry Davis the piano tuner?'. Harper homes in on him and a fight ensues in the Davis household. Barry eventually overpowers Lance and he is arrested.

== Cast ==
- Corey Haim as Barry Davis
- Brittney Lewis as Robin Marchbanks
- Randall England as Lance Harper
- Evan Richards as Brent Meese

== Production ==
The film was filmed in Salt Lake City, Utah.

== Release ==
The film had a limited theatrical release in Miami and Denver in September 1991. One month later it was released in video.
