= Snowboard Academy =

1997 comedy film about snowboarding

- Directed by: John Shepphird
- Written by: Rudy Rupak; James Salisko
- Produced by: Rudy Rupak
- Starring: Corey Haim; Jim Varney; Brigitte Nielsen; Joe Flaherty
- Music by: Ross Vannelli
- Distributed by: Columbia TriStar Home Video
- Release date: October 28, 1997
- Running time: 88 min
- Language: English

Snowboard Academy is a 1997 independent slapstick comedy film directed by John Shepphird and starring Corey Haim, Jim Varney and Brigitte Nielsen.

== Plot ==
A competition is held between two brothers on their father's ski slopes; one is a skier, the other a snowboarder. The competition would determine if snowboarders could be allowed to be a part the ski patrol. Into the scene arrives Rudy James who stumbles his way into a job as ski patrol, entertainment host, and jack of all trades. What was cut out of the film was that Rudy James was hired by Mimi to ineptly sabotage the ski hill so that she could win it in a divorce proceeding. The two brothers discover her plot to damage their father's ski hill.

== Locations ==
Snowboard Academy was shot on location in Chantecler Ski Resorts, which is part of the Laurentides in the city of Sainte-Adele, Quebec. Shooting lasted 20 days. Additional stunt footage was shot in Squaw Valley Ski Resort, California. Stunts were shot and coordinated by Michael Roban.

In a 2005 interview, the lead actor Corey Haim reminisced that the filming of Snowboard Academy was the "hardest to hit my mark on".

== Reception ==
Snowboard Academy is one of the first films to feature snowboarding, which at that time was a burgeoning craze. The movie was not released to general critical acclaim, with reviews best summarised by TV Guide, who stated the film is a "limp ski resort comedy". A more positive review was published by OnSnow, which stated that it contained "everything a good snowboard movie needs". However, it was panned in the book "Ski Films: A Comprehensive Guide" in a full page review that gave the film two stars, and described the film as "Ernest goes skiing." Scott Weinberg of eFilmCritic panned the film's "pathetically broad humor and amazingly atrocious filmmaking technique."
