= Corey Haim: Me, Myself, and I =

- Starring: Corey Haim
- Release date: November 10, 1989
- Running time: 40 minutes
- Country: United States
- Language: English

Corey Haim: Me, Myself, and I is a 1989 promotional film released by Corey Haim shortly after spending time in drug rehabilitation. The film, advertised as a "video diary" was intended to help re-invigorate his career after negative publicity surrounding his drug use. The film follows Haim during a day in his life and attempts to present him as clean, sober and ready to work. However his unfocused monologues, despite the heavy scripting, give the appearance he was under the influence of substances and the film negatively impacted his reputation. In an interview published posthumously in Vice magazine, Haim said that the video was created by a friend and that he (Haim) had just "shown up. The film was called "the worst ever" by X-Entertainment.
