= Corey Feldman =

American actor and musician (born 1971)

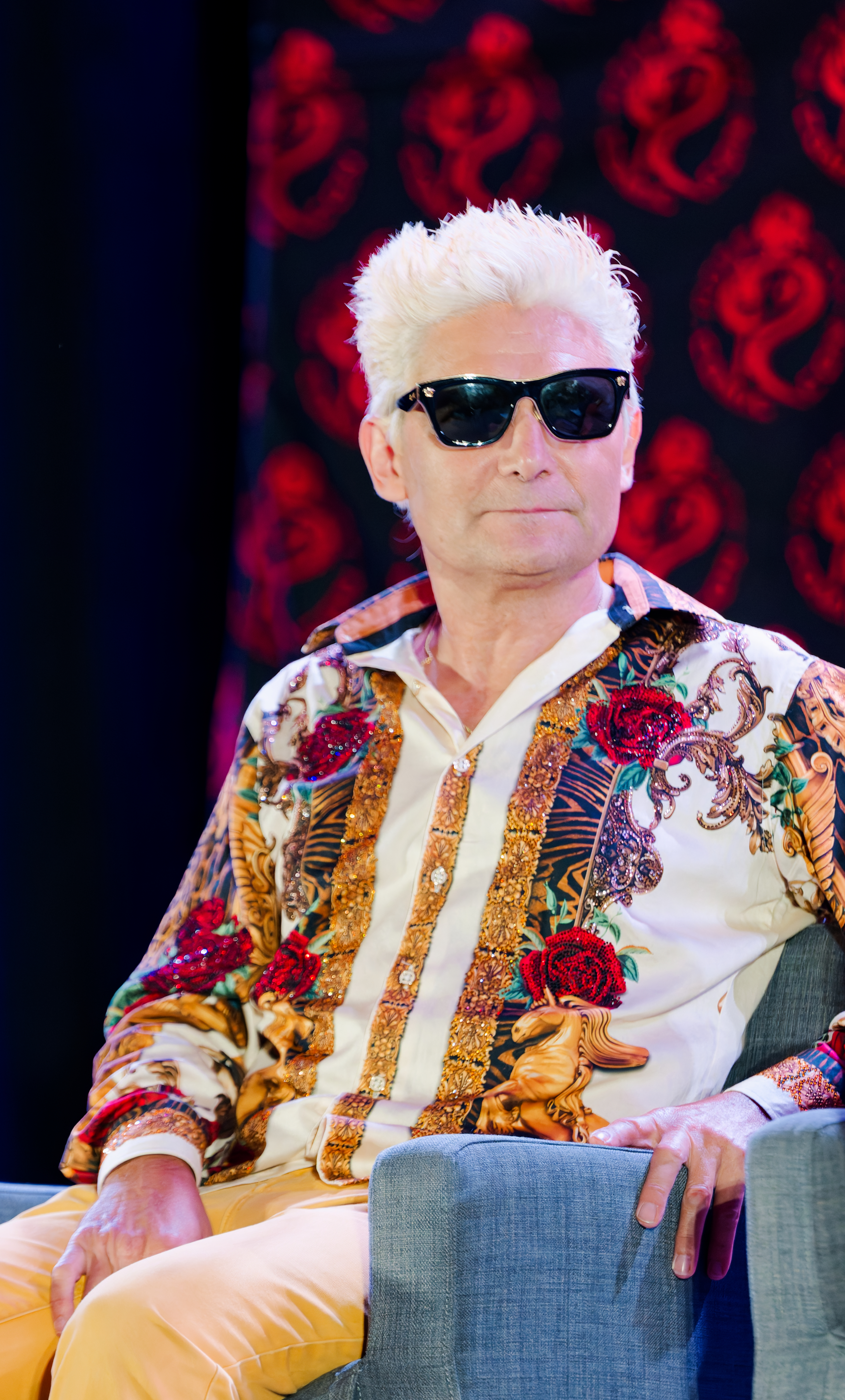
- Feldman in 2025
- Born: Corey Scott Feldman; July 16, 1971 (age 55); Los Angeles, California, U.S.
- Occupations: Actor; musician
- Years active: 1976–present
- Spouses: Vanessa Marcil (m. 1989; div. 1993) Susie Sprague (m. 2002; div. 2014) Courtney Anne Mitchell (m. 2016; div. 2025)
- Children: 1
- Parent: Bob Feldman
- Website: coreyfeldmanofficial.com

Corey Scott Feldman (born July 16, 1971) is an American actor. As a youth, he became well known for his roles in popular 1980s films such as Friday the 13th: The Final Chapter (1984), Gremlins (1984), The Goonies (1985) and Stand by Me (1986). Feldman collaborated with Corey Haim starring in numerous films such as the comedy horror The Lost Boys (1987), the teen comedy License to Drive (1988) and the romantic comedy Dream a Little Dream (1989). They reunited for the A&E reality series The Two Coreys, which ran from 2007 to 2008.

Feldman experienced diminishing success in the film industry as an adult, following well publicized personal conflicts. He has also participated on several reality competition shows, including Dancing on Ice (2012), The Masked Singer (2024), and Dancing with the Stars (2025).

While he has been outspoken about sexual abuse in the entertainment industry, he has also faced public scrutiny over Corey's Angels and has also been accused of sexual misconduct. Feldman has released six studio albums, including Love Left (1992), Former Child Actor (2002), and Angelic 2 the Core (2016). His music has received widespread negative critical attention and has been mocked online.

== Early life ==
Corey Scott Feldman was born on July 16, 1971, in the Reseda neighborhood of Los Angeles, California, the son of Bob and Sheila (née Goldstein) Feldman, a musician and a cocktail waitress, respectively. He was raised Jewish. Feldman has claimed that his parents exploited him for his earning potential as a child actor, and that his mother was abusive. She has denied his accusations.

== Career ==
=== 1980–1989: Early years and breakthrough ===
Feldman as Tommy Jarvis in Friday the 13th: The Final Chapter (1984).

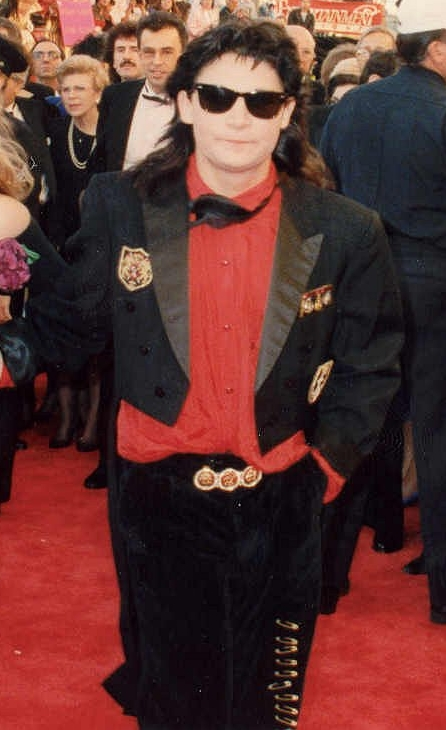
Feldman at the Academy Awards in 1989

Feldman started his career at the age of three, appearing in a McDonald's commercial. In his youth, he appeared in over 100 television commercials and on 50 television series, including The Bad News Bears, Mork & Mindy, Eight Is Enough, One Day at a Time, Madame's Place, and Cheers. He was in the films Time After Time and Disney's The Fox and the Hound. In 1981, he appeared in NBC's musical comedy children's special How to Eat Like a Child alongside other future child stars Billy Jayne and Georg Olden. In 1982, he portrayed "Little Big" Jim Malloy in the single-episode situation comedy Cass Malloy, which served as the pilot for the later sitcom She's the Sheriff.

Feldman became known as a teen idol in the 1980s. During the mid-to-late 1980s, he "was known for being one of the most popular teen pin-ups in the world". He was featured in several consecutive high-grossing movies during this period; those movies included Friday the 13th: The Final Chapter (1984), Gremlins (1984), Friday the 13th: A New Beginning (1985), The Goonies (1985), and Stand By Me (1986) as Teddy Duchamp, the latter alongside River Phoenix, Wil Wheaton, and Jerry O'Connell.

In 1987, Feldman appeared with Corey Haim in The Lost Boys, in which he played Edgar Frog, a role he reprised in two direct-to-video sequels years later, Lost Boys: The Tribe (2008) and Lost Boys: The Thirst (2010). The Lost Boys marked the first onscreen pairing of Feldman and Haim, who became known as "The Two Coreys". The pair went on to star in a string of films, including License to Drive (1988) and Dream a Little Dream (1989). Feldman also voiced the character of Donatello in the original live action Teenage Mutant Ninja Turtles movie.

=== 1990–2006: Career fluctuations ===
After a public battle with drugs, which began shortly after filming concluded for The 'Burbs in 1989, Feldman fought to re-establish his life and career by working with youths, starring in several lesser-known films, and branching out with an album titled Love Left. He returned to the big screen with Teenage Mutant Ninja Turtles III, again providing the voice of Donatello, and starred in the Richard Donner/Robert Zemeckis/Joel Silver film Tales From The Crypt Presents: Bordello of Blood opposite Dennis Miller and Angie Everhart.

In December 1990, as part of a plea deal and following at least three arrests in 1990 alone, Feldman was briefly barred from film and television work. He entered drug rehabilitation after pleading guilty to possession of heroin and cocaine, avoiding drug rehabilitation and driving with a suspended license.

In 1995, Feldman starred with Haim in their last mainstream film together, Dream a Little Dream 2. In the late 1990s, Feldman starred in the CBS series Dweebs. In 1996, Feldman appeared alongside his former Stand By Me co-star Jerry O'Connell in "Electric Twister Acid Test", an episode of the Fox Network series Sliders. In 1999, he appeared as Officer Corey Feldman in the music video for the New Found Glory single "Hit or Miss". In the same year, he made an appearance in the television series The Crow: Stairway to Heaven.

In 2003, he appeared in the celebrity-driven reality series The Surreal Life on The WB. He also made a cameo appearance in the film Dickie Roberts: Former Child Star starring David Spade. He appeared in the theatrical release My Date with Drew and was the voice of "Sprx-77" in the Toon Disney/ABC Family series Super Robot Monkey Team Hyperforce Go!. In 2005, Feldman starred as Michael Douglas in the off-Broadway play Fatal Attraction: A Greek Tragedy, a parody of the 1987 film Fatal Attraction.

=== 2007–present: Reality TV appearances ===
In 2007, Feldman and Haim began a reality television series titled The Two Coreys on the A&E Network. In January 2008, they started production on the second series of The Two Coreys. He was also executive producer for both seasons. In January 2012, Feldman joined the British television series Dancing on Ice with American pair skater Brooke Castile.

In October 2013, Feldman released his first memoir, Coreyography. The book details his early life as a child actor all the way up to the death of Corey Haim. It also discusses his struggles with addiction and as a victim of Hollywood child sexual abuse. In April 2018, Feldman was honored with a Lifetime Achievement Award at the third annual Young Entertainer Awards.

In October 2019, Feldman appeared in an episode of Marriage Boot Camp. In September 2020, he filed a lawsuit against We TV and Think Factory Media for emotional abuse, claiming he was held "hostage" on the set. He also claimed that We TV "falsified information to the public, and discredited Mr. Feldman as a liar on their show" and alleged that Marriage Boot Camp "glamorized abuse" and caused "distress". In March 2021, he dropped his lawsuit against We TV. Court records did not indicate whether they reached a settlement.

Feldman became friends with director Jordan Peele who called him, "one of the greatest teen icons of all time". In 2023, Peele programmed screenings of Feldman's film The Birthday (2005) at Film at Lincoln Center. Peele described the film as "a WTF did I just watch experience" comparing it to Nope, saying that both films are about "exploitation and erasure".

In 2024, Feldman competed in season eleven of The Masked Singer as the wild card contestant "Seal". While eliminated in the Group B finals alongside Clay Aiken and Ruben Studdard as "Beets", there were references to his interactions with Jenny McCarthy.

In 2025, Feldman competed on season 34 of the ABC reality dance competition series Dancing with the Stars where he was paired with dancer Jenna Johnson. Feldman was quickly eliminated, lasting only two episodes.

== Music career ==
Feldman says his greatest influence has been his idol Michael Jackson. Feldman said he studied his dance moves and fashion style and "copied him effortlessly". His first public dancing experience was at 12 years old when he lip synced Michael Jackson's song "Billie Jean".

In 1992, he released his first album, Love Left. He then released his second album, Still Searching for Soul (1999), with his band, Corey Feldman's Truth Movement. In 2002, Feldman released a solo album, Former Child Actor, and promoted it with a second US tour. He appeared in the music video for the Moby single "We Are All Made of Stars".

In 2016, to promote his double album Angelic 2 the Core, he performed with Corey's Angels on the Today Show. The album was a tribute to Michael Jackson and Corey Haim, but the performance went viral, with many online mocking it, including Rolling Stone, who labeled it "bizarre". Anthony Fantano ranked it as both the worst album of 2016 and of the 2010s.

In 2023, Feldman performed at the punk rock music festival Riot Fest in Chicago, Illinois. The booking of Feldman was met with criticism. Julie River of New Noise Magazine wrote, "Booking Corey Feldman for this show felt a little bit mean-spirited. If you've ever seen a video of Feldman performing live, you'll notice it's completely overdone, pretentious, and just outright bizarre" and "The music is mediocre at best, but Feldman's choreography and stage theatrics are positively laughable... Feldman spent an inordinate amount of time on stage complaining about his ex-wives, which felt like a Hollywood cliché and a tad misogynistic".

== Corey's Angels ==
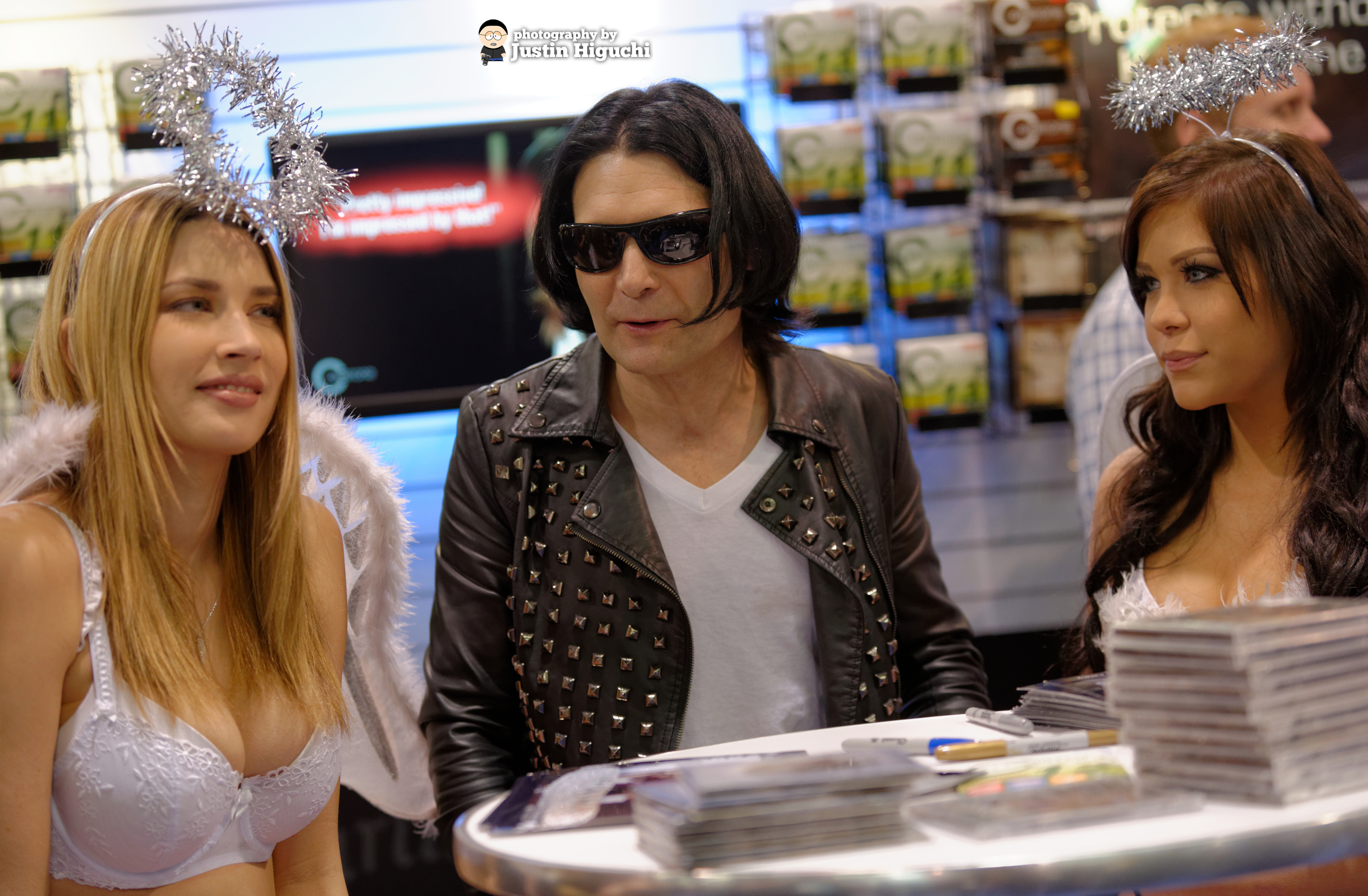
Corey Feldman with two of his Corey's Angels in 2015

In 2015, Feldman and his then-girlfriend, Courtney Anne Mitchell, appeared in an episode of the fourth season of the reality television series Celebrity Wife Swap. His girlfriend swapped with actor/comedian Tommy Davidson's fiancée, Amanda. Feldman sees himself as a Hugh Hefner-like manager over the group of women known as "Corey's Angels". Feldman states that he had helped women get careers in life but through his company, Corey's Angels, he can have control over them and financially benefit. In the episode, Feldman tells these women what to wear, eat, and to do whatever he tells them. Corey's Angels is a musical group Feldman created.

In September 2016, he made an appearance on the Today program to support his album Angelic 2 the Core, which sparked backlash for its unusual nature. Following the Today show appearance Feldman had an interview with The Hollywood Reporter where he discussed the creation of Corey's Angels. He said he met women at the Playboy Mansion who had dreams of acting and singing and stated, "I like helping them...to help girls who were kind of lost and needed help to find their way".

He described the situation as a "360 management, development and production entity". He added that they sought out girls who were 18 and who he thought were "virtuous, and honest and loyal". Feldman was asked about a contract shown in the Celebrity Wife Swap episode, and he stated, while it was not entirely real, "there are certain rules that we have. That's what they based that contract on." Feldman stated the point of the organization is to see "if we could get in and mold them while they're still young and impressionable, while they're moldable, so to speak, we can help them make the right choices." Feldman denied any allegations that the company was degrading to women.

In October 2017, Feldman and his Corey's Angels bandmates were pulled over and arrested in Louisiana. Mitchell was in possession of Xanax. Feldman and his security guards received misdemeanor charges and were immediately released after paying fines. The other Corey's Angels bandmates, including Mitchell, were booked into jail and had to post bond. All of Feldman's Corey Angel's bandmates were released after posting bond overnight.

== Personal life ==
Feldman stated that he began the "Emancipation Proclamation in Hollywood" at age 15, when he was granted emancipation from his parents. He stated that he was worth $1 million by age 15, and by the time the judge ordered the bank records to be supplied, only $40,000 remained.

On March 28, 2018, Feldman claimed that he received a small puncture wound and admitted himself to a hospital. It was later reported by the police that he had no lacerations.

Feldman is a Democrat and an advocate for animal welfare and animal rights; he has adhered to a vegetarian diet since his youth. He appeared with his second wife in a PETA ad campaign promoting vegetarianism. He was awarded the Paws of Fame Award by the Wildlife WayStation for his dedication to animal rights. Feldman holds beliefs in the paranormal.

=== Drug and alcohol abuse ===
Feldman has spoken publicly about his struggles with drug addiction and alcoholism, which he said started due to abuse from his mother and his sexual abuse while in the film industry. In September 1990, he was charged with possession of heroin, in his second narcotics-related charge since March 1990. In October 1990, Feldman entered a live-in drug program. In December 1990, he was suspended from the program for rules violations.

On December 10, 1990, Feldman, who three days prior was arrested for a third time for both driving with a suspended driver's license, legally agreed to enter drug rehabilitation as part of a plea deal. As a result of his December 7, 1990 arrest, which followed his suspension from the live-in drug program, Feldman was not allowed to be released from custody through bail on this occasion. In 2017, he said that he underwent a 10-month rehabilitation process to recover from an addiction to heroin.

In October 2016, Feldman denied being on drugs when he performed on the Today program in September.

In October 2017, his band was pulled over in Mangham, Louisiana. Feldman was in possession of marijuana and driving while his driver's license was suspended. He was charged with misdemeanor possession of marijuana, driving under suspension, and speeding. He paid a $640 fine.

=== Friendship with Corey Haim ===
Feldman and fellow actor Corey Haim were close friends. Feldman first met Haim at the age of 14 on the set of The Lost Boys, a film in which they both acted. The two became known as "The Two Coreys". The Two Coreys "became the hosts of a weekly underage party night for Hollywood Youth called Alphy's Soda Pop Club".

The Two Coreys went on to star in License to Drive (1988) and Dream a Little Dream (1989) together. Becoming a brand, The Two Coreys achieved mainstream fame and notoriety as teen idols. However, both Feldman and Haim experienced career downturns due to drug use.

The Two Coreys, a reality show about The Two Coreys, aired on the A&E Network from 2007 to 2008. The disintegrating relationship between the former best friends prompted a six-month hiatus before the second season. Before Haim's death, he and Feldman reconciled off-camera.

Haim died of pneumonia in 2010, following a long battle with drug addiction. Following Haim's death, Feldman said that he "hoped his friend would be remembered 'as a beautiful, funny, enigmatic character who brought nothing but life and lights and entertainment and art to all of our lives'".

In 2020, Feldman released My Truth: The Rape of 2 Coreys. The documentary explores the friendship between Feldman and Haim and asserts that both were sexually abused as children in the entertainment industry.

Citing both a desire to avoid unwanted publicity and a lack of funds to attend, Feldman missed Haim's funeral and maintained that Haim was his "best friend".

In 2025, Feldman alleged that Haim had molested him. Feldman also stated that Haim informed him that Charlie Sheen told him that such behavior "was OK." Feldman later issued a statement through his attorneys recanting this claim.

=== Friendship with Michael Jackson ===
During his childhood and teen years, Feldman had a close friendship with Michael Jackson. In his book Coreyography, and in several interviews, he stated that he had positive childhood experiences with Jackson: "Michael Jackson's world, crazy as it sounds, had become my happy place... When I was with Michael, it was like being ten years old again." In 2001, their friendship ended because Jackson--based on erroneous information--thought that Feldman would portray him negatively in an upcoming book.

Feldman claimed that on September 11, 2001, Jackson helped get Marlon Brando, Elizabeth Taylor and Liza Minnelli out of New York City but did not help him. In 2002, Feldman retaliated with the song, "Megalo Man", featuring the lyrics: "I believed in your words/I believed in your lies/But in September in New York/You left me to die/I love you, Megalo Man."

In February 2005, Feldman was subpoenaed to testify against Jackson in the singer's child molestation trial. Ultimately, he did not testify.

Feldman has stated that Jackson never touched him inappropriately. In 2018, however, Feldman recounted that when he was 13 or 14 years old, Jackson showed him a book that was "focused on venereal diseases and the genitalia".

After Jackson died in 2009, Feldman dedicated a Los Angeles hospital concert with his rock band, Truth Movement, to the singer.

At times, Feldman has spoken out in defense of Jackson in the wake of the sexual molestation accusations made against him. At other points, he has expressed doubt about Jackson's innocence.

=== Marriages and relationships ===
Feldman was married to actress Vanessa Marcil from 1989 until 1993.

He met actress and model Susie Sprague in a nightclub in January 2002. They married on October 30 2002, on the final episode of the first season of The Surreal Life. The ceremony was co-officiated by a rabbi and by MC Hammer, an ordained minister. In October 2009, the couple split after seven years of marriage. Later that month, Sprague filed for divorce, citing irreconcilable differences. She sought full custody of their son, with Feldman having visitation rights. She also sought spousal support. Feldman sought joint custody and wanted the court to block Sprague's spousal support demand. After a five-year process, the couple's divorce became final in 2014.

On November 22, 2016, Feldman married his long-time girlfriend, Courtney Anne Mitchell. The ceremony was officiated by television producer Marklen Kennedy, at Elton John's Fizz champagne lounge at Caesars Palace in Las Vegas. In August 2023, after 7 years of marriage, it was announced that Feldman was divorcing Courtney amid her continued health issues. In November 2025, a divorce settlement was reached between Feldman and Mitchell.

=== Sexual abuse allegations made by Feldman ===
Feldman contends that sex abuse of child actors is a widespread problem in show business. In October 2017, in response to the Harvey Weinstein sexual abuse allegations, he started an Indiegogo campaign to finance a film about his life to expose the secret child sexual abuse that he claims is just as common in Hollywood as sexism and sexual assault against adults. In March 2018, he spoke at the New York State Capitol in Albany, New York, in support of the Child Victims Act, which would lengthen the statute of limitations for civil claims arising out of acts of child sex abuse, and would create a one-year period in which sex abuse survivors could bring civil claims that were then barred by the statute of limitations.

As an adult, Feldman has identified himself as a survivor of child sexual abuse. According to him, he was molested by a man he first identified only as the alias "Ron Crimson", who worked as an assistant to Feldman's father. Feldman has indicated that "Ron" facilitated his initiation into drug addiction. Feldman later identified that man as actor and former personal assistant Cloyd Jon Grissom. He also accused child agent Marty Weiss and former talent agent and Hollywood underage club owner Alphy Hoffman of having sexually abused him.

During an October 2013 episode of The View, while Feldman was promoting his autobiography Coreyography, Barbara Walters said that Feldman was "damaging an entire industry" with his allegations. In March 2020, in his documentary (My) Truth: The Rape of Two Coreys, Feldman repeated a claim that the actor Charlie Sheen had raped his 13-year-old co-star Corey Haim on the set of the film Lucas. The claim was corroborated by his ex-wife Susie Feldman and his Lost Boys co-star Jamison Newlander.

Sheen, through his publicist, denied the allegations, calling them "sick, twisted and outlandish". Haim's mother Judy had identified a different actor as her son's rapist on The Dr. Oz Show and told Entertainment Tonight that Sheen never raped her son, calling the claims "made up".

In 2025, Feldman alleged that Haim had molested him. Feldman also stated that Haim informed him that Charlie Sheen told him that such behavior "was OK." Feldman later issued a statement through his attorneys recanting this claim.

=== Sexual misconduct allegations against Feldman ===
In January 2018, Feldman was under investigation by police on charges of sexual battery. However, Feldman was cleared of all charges the following month.

In June 2020, Feldman removed himself from the SAG-AFTRA Sexual Harassment Committee after SAG-AFTRA had issued a resolution to remove him from the committee following a number of sexual misconduct allegations that were made. Former members of Corey's Angels have come forward and accused Feldman of having "abused, sexually harassed and taken advantage of them". These women include: Jacqueline Von Rueden (Jezebel Sweet), Poeina Suddarth, Margot Lane, Chantal Knippenburg, Amy Clark, Mara Moon, and Krystal Khali, who detailed information relating to Feldman's conduct with women.

The SAG-AFTRA national board resolution stated that there had been "formal complaints to law enforcement, including the Los Angeles Police Department" against Feldman, and added that "investigations are currently ongoing into the allegations of sexual harassment".

== Filmography ==
=== Film ===
Year	Title	Role	Notes
1978	Born Again	Boy Fisherman #1	
1979	Willa	T.C.	TV movie
1979	Time After Time	Boy at Museum	
1980	Father Figure	Bobby	TV movie
1981	The Fox and the Hound	Young Copper (voice)	
1981	How to Eat Like a Child	Corey	TV movie
1982	The Kid with the Broken Halo	Rafe	TV movie
1983	Still the Beaver	Corey Cleaver	TV movie
1984	Friday the 13th: The Final Chapter	Tommy Jarvis	
1984	Gremlins	Pete Fountaine	
1985	Friday the 13th: A New Beginning	Tommy Jarvis age 12	
1985	The Goonies	Clark "Mouth" Devereaux	
1986	Stand by Me	Teddy Duchamp	
1987	The Lost Boys	Edgar Frog	
1988	License to Drive	Dean	
1989	The 'Burbs	Ricky Butler	
1989	Dream a Little Dream	Bobby Keller	
1990	Teenage Mutant Ninja Turtles	Donatello (voice)	
1991	Edge of Honor	Butler	
1991	Rock 'n' Roll High School Forever	Jessie Davis	
1992	The Magic Voyage	Pico (voice)	
1992	Meatballs 4	Ricky Wade	Video
1992	Round Trip to Heaven	Larry	
1993	National Lampoon's Loaded Weapon 1	Young Cop	
1993	Stepmonster	Phlegm	Video
1993	Teenage Mutant Ninja Turtles III	Donatello (voice)	
1993	Blown Away	Wes Gardner	TV movie
1994	Lipstick Camera	Joule Iverson	
1994	National Lampoon's Last Resort	Sam	Video
1994	Maverick	Bank Robber	
1994	A Dangerous Place	Taylor	
1995	Dream a Little Dream 2	Bobby Keller	Video
1995	Voodoo	Andy	Video
1995	South Beach Academy	Billy Spencer	Video
1996	Evil Obsession	Homer	
1996	Bordello of Blood	Caleb Verdoux	
1996	Red Line	Tony	
1997	Busted	David	Video
1997	Born Bad	Marco	
1998	She's Too Tall	Doug Beckwith	
1998	Legion	Siegal	TV movie
1998	Serial Killing 4 Dummys	Store Clerk	
1998	Storm Trooper	Roth	Video
1998	The Waterfront	Charlie Shogy	
2000	The Million Dollar Kid	Charles	
2000	The Scarecrow	Max the Mouse (voice)	
2000	Citizen Toxie: The Toxic Avenger IV	Sarah's Gynecologist	
2001	My Life as a Troll	-	
2001	Seance	John	
2002	Project Redlight	Himself	Short
2002	Bikini Bandits	Angel Gabriel	
2003	Pauly Shore Is Dead	Himself	
2003	Dickie Roberts: Former Child Star	Himself	
2004	No Witness	Mark Leiter	
2004	Puppet Master vs Demonic Toys	Robert Toulon	TV movie
2004	The Birthday	Norman Forrester	
2005	Space Daze	Himself	Video
2008	Lost Boys: The Tribe	Edgar Frog	Video
2008	Terror Inside	Allen	
2009	Hooking Up	Ryan Thompson	
2009	Lucky Fritz	Lucky Fritz	
2010	Lost Boys: The Thirst	Edgar Frog	Video
2011	Operation: Belvis Bash	Samuel Stilman	
2011	From Rags to Reuben	Marcus Drummond	TV movie
2012	Six Degrees of Hell	Kyle Brenner	
2012	Worth: The Testimony of Johnny St. James	Chad	
2013	Exposure	Seth	
2013	The Zombie King	Kalfu	
2013	Zombex	Dr. Jamison	
2014	The M Word	Benny Becker	
2015	Body High	Apparition	
2016	JOB's Daughter	Agent Barnes	
2018	Corbin Nash	Queeny	
2019	Parallel	Principal Davidson	Short
2020	Teenage Girl: First Wheels	Cliff	
2020	The Sunday Night Slaughter	James Diamond	
2021	Age of Stone and Sky: The Sorcerer Beast	Sorcerer Beast (voice)	
2021	13 Fanboy	Mike Merryman	
2022	Suicide for Beginners	Randy	
2022	SAVJ	Narrator	Short
2023	Sour Party	Leslie	
2024	Going Viral	Samurai	

=== Television ===
Year	Title	Role	Notes
1978	America 2-Night	Various Roles	Recurring Cast
1978	Eight Is Enough	Daycare Kid	Episode: "Cops and Toddlers"
1978	Alice	Orphan Boy	Episode: "Who Ordered the Hot Turkey?"
1979	Angie	Harvey Anders	Episode: "Harvey's Mother"
1979	The Love Boat	Charlie Hanrahan	Episode: "April's Return/Super Mom/I'll See You Again"
1979–80	The Bad News Bears	Regi Tower	Main Cast
1980	Mork & Mindy	Billy	Recurring Cast: Season 3
1981	I'm a Big Girl Now	Jerome	Episode: "It's Him or Me"
1981	Foul Play	Jamie	Episode: "Double Play"
1982	The Love Boat	Mike Lee	Episode: "Green, But Not Jolly/Past Perfect Love/Instant Family"
1982	Father Murphy	Henry Wade	Episode: "In God's Arms"
1982	Open All Night	Jason Mercer	Episode: "The Chicken Suit"
1982	Madame's Place	Buzzy St. James	Recurring Cast
1983	Lottery!	Adam Matson	Episode: ""Denver: Following Through""
1983	Cheers	Moose	Episode: "Manager Coach"
1984	One Day at a Time	Keith Schneider	Episode: "Another Man's Shoes"
1986	Family Ties	Walter	Episode: "The Disciple"
1986	Heart of the City	Conrad	Episode: "Rock and Rumble"
1987	Wordplay	Himself/Panelist	Recurring Panelist
1987	The New Hollywood Squares	Himself/Panelist	Recurring Panelist
1989	CBS Schoolbreak Special	Jeff Hoyt	Episode: "15 and Getting Straight"
1989	Trying Times	Bill	Episode: "The Boss"
1990	Disneyland	Schenke	Episode: "Exile"
1992	Married... with Children	Ralph	Episode: "T-R-A Something, Something Spells Tramp"
1994	Burke's Law	Gerard Duke	Episode: "Who Killed the Host at the Roast?"
1994	Tales from the Crypt	Todd	Episode: "The Assassin"
1994–96	Eek! The Cat	Bo Diddly Squat (voice)	Recurring Cast
1995	Dweebs	Vic	Main Cast
1996	Sliders	Reed Michener	Episode: "Electric Twister Acid Test"
1999	The Directors	Himself	Episode: "The Films of Rob Reiner"
1999	The Crow: Stairway to Heaven	Chris Draven	Episode: "Brother's Keeper"
2000	Son of the Beach	Band Manager	Episode: "Attack of the Cocktopuss"
2001	The Test	Himself/Panelist	Episode: "The '80s Test"
2001	E! True Hollywood Story	Himself	Episode: "Corey Haim"
2001	Dark Realm	Johnny	Episode: "Johnny's Guitar"
2002	Weakest Link	Himself	Episode: "Newsmakers Edition #2"
2002	Big Wolf on Campus	Himself	Episode: "What's the Story Mourning Corey?"
2002–03	The Greatest	Himself	Recurring Guest
2003	The Guardian	Gavin Putinski	Episode: "You Belong to Me"
2003	The Surreal Life	Himself	Main Cast: Season 1
2003	Hollywood Squares	Himself/Panelist	Recurring Panelist
2003	Intimate Portrait	Himself	Episode: "Vanessa Marcil"
2003	I Love the '80s Strikes Back	Himself	Episode: "1985" & "1987"
2003	Reel Comedy	Himself	Episode: "Dickie Roberts: Former Child Star"
2004	High Chaparall	Himself	Episode: "Bad People: Corey Feldman"
2004	Greg The Bunny	Himself	Episode: "Jimmy Drives Gil Crazy"
2004–06	Super Robot Monkey Team Hyperforce Go!	SPRX-77 (voice)	Main Cast
2006	The Drug Years	Himself	Main Guest
2006	Robot Chicken	Himself (voice)	Episode: "Federated Resources"
2007	100 Greatest Teen Stars	Himself	Episode: "Hour 4"
2007–08	The Two Coreys	Himself	Main Cast
2007–08	Biography	Himself	Episode: "The Coreys" & "Sam Kinison"
2009	Free Radio	Himself	Episode: "Anna's Date"
2009	Splatter	Jonny Splatter	Main Cast
2010	The Horrible Terrible Misadventures of David Atkins	Himself	Episode: "Success"
2010	Celebrity Ghost Stories	Himself	Episode: "Episode #2.1"
2010	Warren the Ape	Himself	Recurring Cast
2011	So Random!	Various Roles	Recurring Cast
2011	Psych	Thorn	Episode: "This Episode Sucks"
2011	Easy to Assemble	Ethan McStall	Recurring Cast: Season 3
2012	Dancing on Ice	Himself/Contestant	Contestant: Season 7
2012	Border Security: Canada's Front Line	Himself	Episode: "Episode #1.2" & "#1.3"
2012	Celebrity Juice	Himself	Guest Cast: Season 7-8
2013	7DaysLater	Scotty	Episode: "Apocalypse"
2013–17	Teenage Mutant Ninja Turtles	Slash	Recurring Cast: Season 2-4, Guest: Season 5
2014	Insane Clown Posse Theater	Himself	Episode: "Corey Feldman"
2014	E! True Hollywood Story	Himself	Episode: "Reality Aftermath"
2014	The Birthday Boys	The Writer	Episode: "Season Finale"
2015	Hot Package	Himself	Episode: "The HP Success Awards"
2015	Celebrity Wife Swap	Himself	Episode: "Tommy Davidson/Corey Feldman"
2015	Turbo FAST	Torquer (voice)	Episode: "The Day Mel Fell"
2015	Minecraft: Story Mode	Magnus the Rogue (voice)	Recurring Cast
2016	Hollywood Medium with Tyler Henry	Himself	Episode: "Corey Feldman/Rachel Hunter/Evelyn Lozada"
2017	American Dad!	Announcer (voice)	Episode: "A Whole Slotta Love"
2019	Marriage Boot Camp: Reality Stars	Himself	Episode: "Family Edition: Caution, Family Secrets Ahead"
2020	JJ Villard's Fairy Tales	Various Roles (voice)	Episode: "Snow White"
2023	Only You: An Animated Shorts Collection	Himself (voice)	Episode: "Monstr"
2024	Livin' the Scream	Himself	Episode: "Corey Feldman LIVE in Las Vegas"
2024	Menendez Brothers: Murder by Media	Himself	Recurring Guest
2024	Beyond Belief: Fact or Fiction	Fritz	Episode: "Episode #6.7"
2024	The Masked Singer	Himself/Seal	Contestant: Season 11
2025	Dancing with the Stars	Himself/Contestant	Contestant: Season 34
2026	The 'Burbs	Ricky Butler	Episode: "Only One Way Out"
2026	Toon In with Me	Himself	Episode: "The Summer I Came of Age"

=== Music videos ===
Year	Title	Artist	Role
1985	"The Goonies R Good Enough"	Cyndi Lauper	Clark "Mouth" Devereaux
1988	"Drive My Car"	Breakfast Club	Dean
1989	"Liberian Girl"	Michael Jackson	Himself
1996	"Freak of the Week"	DJ Polo featuring Ron Jeremy	Himself
2000	"Hit or Miss"	New Found Glory	Officer Corey Feldman
2002	"We Are All Made of Stars"	Moby	Himself
2011	"Last Friday Night"	Katy Perry	Kirk Terry
2013	"City of Angels"	Thirty Seconds to Mars	Himself
2025	"You Know My Name"	Foxy Shazam	Himself

=== Video games ===
Year	Title	Voice role	Notes
1996	Normality	Kent Knutson	US version
2014	Teenage Mutant Ninja Turtles: Danger of the Ooze	Slash	
2015	Minecraft: Story Mode	Magnus the Rogue	

=== Documentary ===
Year	Title
2001	Porn Star: The Legend of Ron Jeremy
2003	Mayor of the Sunset Strip
2004	My Date with Drew
2013	Crystal Lake Memories: The Complete History of Friday the 13th
2020	My Truth: The Rape of 2 Coreys
2025	Corey Feldman vs. the World

== Discography ==
=== Solo ===
- Love Left (1994)
- Former Child Actor (2002)
- Angelic 2 the Core (2016)
- Love Left 2: Arm Me with Love (2021)

=== With Corey Feldman's Truth Movement ===
- Still Searching for Soul (1999)
- Technology Analogy (2010)

== Awards and nominations ==
Year	Award	Category	Nominee	Result
1983	Young Artist Awards	Best Young Actor, Guest on a Series	The Love Boat	Nominated
1984	Young Artist Awards	Best Young Actor, Guest on a Television Series	Lottery!	Nominated
1985	Young Artist Awards	Best Young Supporting Actor in a Motion Picture	Gremlins	Nominated
1985	Saturn Award	Best Performance by a Younger Actor	Gremlins	Nominated
1986	Young Artist Awards	Exceptional Performance by a Younger Actor - Motion Picture	The Goonies	Nominated
1987	Young Artist Awards	Jackie Coogan Award (Shared with Wil Wheaton, River Phoenix, and Jerry O'Connell)	Stand By Me	Won
1988	Young Artist Awards	Best Young Actor in a Horror Film	The Lost Boys	Won
1989	Young Artist Awards	Best Young Actor in a Comedy Film	License to Drive	Won

== Books written ==
- Coreyography: A Memoir, St. Martin's Press, 2013. ISBN 0312609337, 978-0312609337
