= Dream a Little Dream 2 =

- Directed by: James Lemmo
- Written by: Susan Forman; Mark Sevi; David Weissman
- Produced by: Paul Hertzberg; Christopher J. Black; Corey Feldman; Catalaine Knell
- Starring: Corey Feldman; Corey Haim; Robyn Lively; Stacie Randall
- Music by: Johnny Caruso; Corey Feldman; Scott Grusin
- Production companies: CineTel Films; Dream Square Productions, Inc.
- Distributed by: Columbia Tristar Home Video (1995); Echo Bridge Home Entertainment (2007)
- Release date: February 21, 1995
- Running time: 91 minutes
- Country: United States
- Language: English

Dream a Little Dream 2 is a 1995 direct-to-video American teen comedy film, starring Corey Feldman, Corey Haim, Robyn Lively and Stacie Randall. Directed by James Lemmo, this film is the sequel to the 1989 film Dream a Little Dream. It is one of nine films featuring The Two Coreys.

== Plot ==
The pair of Bobby Keller and Dinger each find themselves with a pair of seemingly ordinary sunglasses. But, this is no normal pair of shades — once two people are wearing the set, one can manipulate the other physically to do whatever their mind wishes to.

The set of sunglasses were part of an experiment, and the original owners of the products will stop at nothing to get them back from Bobby and Dinger.

== Production notes ==
Dream a Little Dream 2 was filmed in Los Angeles, California.
