= The Two Coreys (TV series) =

- Genre: Reality
- Starring: Corey Feldman; Corey Haim
- Country of origin: United States
- Original language: English
- No. of seasons: 2
- No. of episodes: 19

Production
- Executive producers: Chris Coelen; Corey Feldman; Corey Haim; Greg Goldman; John Foy; Michael Morrison; Robert Sharenow; Scott Carlson; Scott Lonker; Tony Yates; Troy Searer; Sholom Gelt
- Camera setup: Single
- Running time: 20-22 minutes
- Production companies: Carlson Entertainment; Tijuana Entertainment; Zodiak USA

Original release
- Network: A&E
- Release: July 29, 2007 – August 17, 2008

The Two Coreys is an American reality television series that chronicles the lives of The Coreys, actors Corey Feldman and Corey Haim. Originally announced in 2006 as The Coreys: Return of the Lost Boys, the series premiered July 29, 2007, and aired on A&E for two seasons.

== Episodes ==
=== Season 1 (2007) ===
No.	Title	Original release date
1	"Reunited"	July 29, 2007
Corey Haim moves in with longtime friend Corey Feldman and his wife Susie.
2	"Lost Boys"	July 29, 2007
Haim, Feldman, Susie and Jamison Newlander attend a 20th anniversary screening of The Lost Boys.
3	"Cold Turkey"	August 5, 2007
Susie and Feldman quit smoking, but Haim's influence causes Feldman to relent.
4	"Flirting Surprise Party"	August 5, 2007
Feldman and Susie throw a surprise party for Haim's 35th birthday. Haim tries to get his driver's license.
5	"Wing Man"	August 12, 2007
Haim begins dating with suggestions from Feldman.
6	"The Great Escape"	August 19, 2007
Feldman and Susie go on a trip.
7	"Battle of the Band"	August 19, 2007
Haim surprises Feldman by booking Feldman's band, the Truth Movement, at a local club.
8	"Fly Away Haim"	August 26, 2007
Haim has another argument with Susie, which leads to a confrontation with Feldman. Haim leaves.
9	"The Clip Show"	September 9, 2007
Feldman and Susie host a review of living with Haim in the past weeks.

=== Season 2 (2008) ===
No.	Title	Original release date
1	"Showdown"	June 22, 2008
Picking up from their fight the last season, Haim returns to Los Angeles to meet Feldman. The continued animosity reveals disturbing childhood secrets.
2	"Couples Therapy"	June 22, 2008
The two Coreys express their disagreements to a therapist.
3	"Career Moves"	June 29, 2008
Haim considers not appearing in Lost Boys 2 which frustrates Feldman. Haim gets an assistant.
4	"Making Amends"	June 29, 2008
Haim makes a public apology in Variety, while trying to make up with Feldman and his wife Susie.
5	"Lost Boy"	July 13, 2008
An anxious Haim forget his lines during filming of Lost Boys 2. Feldman confronts Haim during a therapy session.
6	"All You Need Is Love"	July 20, 2008
Feldman and Susie celebrate Valentine's Day. Haim goes on a date.
7	"Role Models"	July 27, 2008
Haim spends time with his father Bernie. Feldman's wife, Susie, takes pictures for Playboy magazine.
8	"Intervention"	August 3, 2008
Feldman contacts Pauly Shore and Todd Bridges for assistance in helping Haim.
9	"Hang Ups"	August 10, 2008
Feldman gets liposuction as he considers not associating with Haim until he gets help for his addiction issues. Haim's assistant expresses her worries to his mother Judy.
10	"Crash"	August 17, 2008
Feldman and therapist are concerned Haim has an addiction problem. Haim gets defensive and leaves therapy session. Afterwards on his way home, he has a car accident, but nobody gets hurt.

== Later allegations made by Feldman against Haim ==
In the December 2025 documentary Corey Feldman vs. The World, Feldman alleged that Corey Haim had sexually molested him during the time they were acting in the 1987 film The Lost Boys. Feldman also stated that Haim informed him that Charlie Sheen, who Feldman has long alleged molested Haim, told him that such behavior was acceptable.

On December 20th 2025, Feldman withdrew his claim that Haim had sexually molested him, via a statement from lawyers.
