= Demolition High =

1996 action film by Jim Wynorski

- Film poster
- Directed by: Jim Wynorski
- Written by: Steve Jankowski
- Produced by: Angela Baynes
- Starring: Corey Haim; Alan Thicke; Dick Van Patten; Jeff Kober; Melissa Brasselle
- Cinematography: Zoran Hochstätter
- Edited by: Richard Gentner
- Music by: Kevin Kiner
- Production company: Sunset Films International
- Distributed by: Cabin Fever Entertainment
- Release date: September 10, 1996
- Running time: 84 minutes
- Country: United States
- Language: English

Demolition High is a 1996 American direct-to-video action film directed by Jim Wynorski, and starring Corey Haim, Alan Thicke, and Dick Van Patten.

== Plot ==
A group of terrorists, led by Luther, take over a high school. While authorities negotiate with the terrorists, a group of students, led by Lenny Slater, lead a revolt in order to prevent a disaster.

== Cast ==
- Corey Haim as Lenny Slater
- Alan Thicke as Slater
- Dick Van Patten as General Wainwright
- Melissa Brasselle as Tanya
- Jeff Kober as Luther
- Stacie Randall as Dugan

== Production ==
Wynorski later recalled "Corey Haim was a nice kid who was totally fucked up in the head. You could see the path he was going down even then. I wish I could have turned him around. But I had to have a paid babysitter with him all the time. Believe it or not, he had to have a babysitter. The kid was in his early 20s and still didn’t have it figured out yet."

== Legacy ==
In 1997, the sequel Demolition University was released with Haim reprising his role as Lenny and Ami Dolenz as Jenny.

Demolition High is referenced in Paul Thomas Anderson's 1999 film Magnolia, in which multiple characters in the entertainment industry mention auditions for a film with Haim and Thicke, involving the destruction of a high school.
