= Dream a Little Dream (film) =

1989 film by Marc Rocco

- Promotional film poster
- Directed by: Marc Rocco
- Written by: Marc Rocco; Daniel Jay Franklin; D.E. Eisenberg
- Produced by: Marc Rocco; D.E. Eisenberg
- Starring: Jason Robards; Corey Feldman; Piper Laurie; Meredith Salenger; Harry Dean Stanton; Corey Haim; Susan Blakely; William McNamara; Matt Adler; Victoria Jackson; Alex Rocco
- Cinematography: King Baggot
- Edited by: Russell Livingstone
- Music by: John William Dexter
- Distributed by: Vestron Pictures
- Release date: March 3, 1989
- Running time: 115 minutes
- Country: United States
- Language: English
- Box office: $5,171,429 - $5,552,441

Dream a Little Dream is a 1989 American fantasy-romantic comedy-drama film directed by Marc Rocco and starring Corey Feldman, Corey Haim, Meredith Salenger, Jason Robards, Piper Laurie and Harry Dean Stanton. It was filmed in Wilmington, North Carolina. This was the third film featuring Feldman and Haim together, who often were referred to as "The Two Coreys". A direct to video sequel, Dream a Little Dream 2, was released in 1995. The film was critically panned and a box-office disappointment.

== Plot ==
Bobby Keller is a slacker high school student who, while running through a short cut through a backyard in his neighborhood one night, collides with Lainie Diamond, over whom Bobby has recently been obsessing. During the collision, elderly professor Coleman Ettinger is performing a meditation exercise in the yard with his wife Gena, theorizing that if he and his wife can enter a meditative alpha state together voluntarily, they will be able to live together forever. However, just as the Ettingers are on the verge of completing their meditation experiment, Bobby and Lainie's collision renders both teens unconscious, enacting a type of body switch between the four characters.

Bobby wakes up in his bedroom to find his best friend Dinger and his parents asking him if he's okay, but "Bobby" has no idea who these people are because he is actually Coleman trapped in Bobby's body. Coleman leaves the house to find Gena but returns when he cannot find her or make any sense of the situation. On his return to Bobby's home, Coleman plays up the role of Bobby for his family and friend, just wanting to go to sleep to see if the alpha state he attains in dreams will give him any clue to what has gone wrong with the experiment.

In his dream, Coleman is greeted by the real Bobby, who appears to be trapped in a dream partially generated by Coleman's own subconscious. Coleman discovers that Gena, skeptical of her husband's "dream state" theory from the beginning, is also trapped in the dream but is unable to communicate with him because part of her mind has been transferred to Lainie's body. Bobby informs Coleman that he has very little time to prevent what's left of Gena from forgetting about him and becoming lost in the dream forever.

Bobby claims to know the secret to switch them all back, yet is reluctant to help Coleman do so, finding the dream-world he now inhabits to be more satisfying than the physical world in which he existed as a troubled teen. Coleman realizes he only has a few days (while pretending to be Bobby) to overcome generation gaps, high-school bullies, Lainie's violent and unstable boyfriend Joel, and Lainie's bitter and manipulative divorced mother Cherry in order to improve Bobby's grades, love-life, relationships with his family and friends, and connect with Lainie (who is not particularly fond of Bobby) enough to convince her to recreate the meditation experiment that might save Gena.

== Cast ==
- Corey Feldman as Bobby Keller
- Corey Haim as Dinger
- Meredith Salenger as Lainie Diamond
- Jason Robards as Coleman Ettinger
- Piper Laurie as Gena Ettinger
- Harry Dean Stanton as Ike Baker
- William McNamara as Joel
- Susan Blakely as Cherry Diamond
- Alex Rocco as Gus Keller
- Victoria Jackson as Kit Keller
- Matt Adler as Dumas
- Ria Pavia as Maureen
- Lala as Shelley
- Laura Lee Norton as Marge
- John Ward as Derek
- Josh Evans as Low Life #1
- Jody Smith as Low Life #2
- Kent Faulcon as Low Life #3
- Russell Livingstone as Neighbor Next Door
- Mickey Thomas as Mr. Pattison
- Fran Taylor as Sheila Baker
- Jon Grissom as P.E. Coach
- John Ford Coley as Ron

== Music ==
The soundtrack includes a mix of 1980s rock and classic music. Michael Damian covered the 1973 David Essex song "Rock On" which rose to number 1 on the Billboard Hot 100 the week of June 3, 1989, helped by a video featuring the film's lead actors.

Mickey Thomas, the lead singer of 1980s band Starship, recorded the film's title theme song and its duet version with Mel Tormé for the soundtrack. Thomas also appears as the teacher Mr. Pattison in the film.

Track listing

1. "Dream a Little Dream of Me" by Mickey Thomas - (Fabian André; Gus Kahn; Wilbur Schwandt) – 2:52
2. "Time Runs Wild" by Danny Wilde - (Danny Wilde) – 4:44
3. "Whenever There's a Night" by Mike Reno - (John William Dexter; Tom Whitlock) – 3:34
4. "Dreams Come True (Stand Up and Take It)" by Lone Justice - (Gregg Sutton; Maria McKee) – 4:05
5. "Into the Mystic" by Van Morrison - (Van Morrison) – 3:30
6. "It's the End of the World as We Know It (And I Feel Fine)" by R.E.M. - (Peter Buck; Mike Mills; Michael Stipe; Bill Berry) – 4:00
7. "Rock On" by Michael Damian - (David Albert Cook) – 3:21
8. "You'd Better Wait" by Fee Waybill - (Rick Neigher; James House) – 3:21
9. "Never Turn Away" by Chris Thompson - (John William Dexter; Tom Whitlock) – 3:07
10. "I've Got Dreams to Remember" by Otis Redding - (Otis Redding; Zelma Redding; Joe Rock) – 3:12
11. "Dream a Little Dream of Me" by Mel Tormé & Mickey Thomas - (Fabian André; Gus Kahn; Wilbur Schwandt) – 2:51

Songs

- "Future's So Bright I Gotta Wear Shades" by Timbuk 3 - (Pat MacDonald)
- "Young At Heart" by Frank Sinatra - (Johnny Richards; Carolyn Leigh)
- "The Midnight Hour" by Wilson Pickett - (Wilson Pickett; Steve Cropper)
- "Where Is She?" by Blue Future - (Larry Weir)
- "Dress To Kill" by Steve Plunkett - (John William Dexter; Steve Plunkett)

== Charts ==
Chart (1990)	Peak position
Australia (ARIA Charts)	80

== Reception ==
=== Box office ===
The movie made $2,568,963 during its opening weekend, with its widest release, in 1,019 theaters. The following week, its weekend gross dropped dramatically (by around 51%). Its domestic gross came out to be around $5,500,000.

=== Critical response ===
The film received largely negative reviews, earning a 9% on Rotten Tomatoes based on all 11 reviews counted. On Metacritic, the film has a score of 32 out of 100, based on 12 critics. Roger Ebert of The Chicago Sun-Times gave the film half a star out of a possible four. He wrote that advertising for Dream a Little Dream presented the film as a standard teen comedy, without mentioning the supernatural body-swap premise, while "The plot is a disorganized mess."
