= Fatal Attraction: A Greek Tragedy =

Fatal Attraction: A Greek Tragedy is a parody stage play of the 1987 film Fatal Attraction co-written by Alana McNair and Kate Wilkinson and directed by Timothy Haskell. It ran Off-Broadway from July 1-August 27, 2005, starring Corey Feldman. It was later produced at regional theaters across the United States.

== Run ==
The play had a limited Off-Broadway run in the summer of 2005 at the East 13th Street Theatre. Corey Feldman played the role of Michael Douglas, star of the 1987 film. Co-writer Alana McNair played the role of Glenn Close and co-writer Kate Wilkinson played the role of Anne Archer. The plot loosely followed the film and included a chorus that commented on the action by using text from the Greek tragedy oeuvre which served to satirize the film's blatant fear of the successful business woman in contrast to its celebration of traditional family values. The running time was 70 minutes with no intermission.

The play opened to mixed reviews with Variety calling it a "campy spoof" and TheaterMania calling it "short on substance but long on style." Entertainment Weekly added the show to its must list for July 2005.

== Regional productions ==
- 2006 Actors Theater of Washington Washington, DC
- 2007 Stray Cat Theatre Phoenix, AZ
- 2007 & 2011 Ringwald Theatre Ferndale, MI
- 2007 Bloomington Playwrights Project Bloomington, IN
- 2008 Hole in the Wall Theatre New Britain, CT
