= Watchers (film) =

1988 film by Jon Hess

- Theatrical release poster
- Directed by: Jon Hess
- Screenplay by: Bill Freed; Damian Lee
- Based on: Watchers by Dean Koontz
- Produced by: Damian Lee; David Mitchell
- Starring: Corey Haim; Barbara Williams; Michael Ironside; Lala
- Cinematography: Richard Leiterman
- Edited by: Bill Freda; Carolle Alain; Rick Fields
- Music by: Joel Goldsmith
- Production companies: Rose & Ruby Productions; Carolco Pictures; Concorde Pictures; Centaur Films
- Distributed by: Universal Pictures (United States); Alliance Releasing (Canada)
- Release date: December 2, 1988
- Running time: 91 minutes
- Countries: Canada; United States
- Language: English
- Box office: $940,173

Watchers is a 1988 science fiction horror film directed by Jon Hess and starring Corey Haim, Michael Ironside, Barbara Williams, and Lala Sloatman. Loosely based on the 1987 novel Watchers by Dean R. Koontz, the film revolves around a boy who befriends an unusually intelligent stray dog being hunted by a ruthless government agent and a dangerous mutated creature. It is the first installment in the Watchers film series.

== Plot ==
An explosion occurs in a classified research laboratory, causing an intense fire. A mutated monster known as the OXCOM (Outside Experimental Combat Mammal) escapes and chases a Golden Retriever from the same lab, through the surrounding woods. The dog outruns it and the OXCOM hides in a barn. In the barn, Travis Cornell is with his girlfriend Tracey. Thinking it is her father, Travis leaves. Tracey discovers the beast and screams, summoning her father who is attacked. Meanwhile, Travis finds the dog in the back of his truck and a military/police force is sweeping the area for the escapees. Travis starts to realize the dog is extraordinary and decides to keep it. Meanwhile, an NSO agent named Lem Johnson is dispatched by the corporation to retrieve the animals.

The next morning, Travis's mother Nora informs him that there has been an accident and that Tracey is in the hospital. Travis and Nora rush to the hospital, but Agent Johnson and his partner will not allow them to see her. Travis pushes past them into Tracey's room, only to find it completely empty. The men claim that she has been transferred to a better location. Travis is puzzled as to why the men were armed. At home, Nora is displeased about the dog. She allows him to keep it when Travis shows the level of intelligence that the dog possesses. While bathing the dog, Travis sees GH3 tattooed on its ear, and concludes it is a research dog, which would explain its superior intellect.

Agent Johnson stops by Travis' house to ask questions and the dog hides. The dog tracks Travis down at school, where he types 'D ANG ER N S O' on a computer. Travis is given detention for bringing a pet to school. Meanwhile, three of Travis's friends are murdered by the OXCOM in the woods. The OXCOM then traces the dog to the school, where two staff members are killed. One is able to call the police. The now-suspicious sheriff and a policewoman arrive, and she is also killed. When the sheriff confronts Agent Johnson, he is forced to tell the sheriff the truth regarding the killer but asks that they move to a quieter location away from the press. He explains that it was a scientific project gone wrong and that the OXCOM is chasing the dog, which targets and kills anything it comes across or that has been in contact with the dog. He then abruptly murders the sheriff.

A family friend who is fixing the washing machine mentions that a man stopped by earlier asking if they owned a dog. Travis, realizing the NSO is after them, sneaks out of the house. Nora stops him before he can drive away, telling him that they are in it together. Back inside, they find their friend dead. They run upstairs with the dog, locking the bedroom door. The beast begins to break it down. Nora climbs onto the adjacent rooftop while Travis grabs a hunting gun. He tells her to start the truck and jumps out the window followed by the dog who is knocked down by the OXCOM. He fires, then picks up the injured dog, and the three drive to a veterinarian. Noticing the code on the dog's ear, the vet calls the authorities. Travis catches on and they leave the vet's office before the NSO agents can arrive. The next morning after the agents track them to the motel where they are staying, Nora creates a diversion, allowing Travis and the dog to escape the NSO agents. Travis takes the dog to his father's old cabin in the woods. Nora insists the NSO agents let her visit Tracey. Although Johnson claims the NSO is protecting her while she recovers, Nora realizes that the sedated Tracey is unharmed and her room has no medical equipment and that the NSO is holding her as a prisoner.

The agents take the women to the cabin to use as hostages, but Travis throws a homemade Molotov cocktail at the NSO agents, allowing Nora and Tracey to run into the cabin. Agent Johnson fires at them, but he is stopped by his partner who balks at murdering a woman and two kids. Johnson then reveals that he is the corporation's third experiment, a genetically engineered assassin with no conscience, and shoots his partner in the head. In a tussle with Johnson, Travis is stabbed in the leg with his own knife. The dog jumps through the window and onto Johnson, allowing Travis to stab him through the neck. Johnson, unfazed by the stab wound, claims that they will die anyway before being shot to death by Nora. Armed with homemade weapons, the team readies themselves for the beast. When it arrives, Travis shoots at it and it throws the dog into the truck windshield. Travis follows it into the woods, where he finds it injured and sobbing. At first, he cannot bring himself to kill it. It then attacks him and he is forced to finish it off. Travis, Nora, Tracey and the dog regroup and leave in the beat-up truck as the farmhouse burns down.

== Cast ==
- Corey Haim as Travis Cornell
- Barbara Williams as Nora Cornell
- Michael Ironside as Lemuel "Lem" Johnson
- Lala as Tracey Keeshan
- Dave Wilson as Bill Keeshan
- Duncan Fraser as Sheriff Gaines
- Jason Priestley as Boy On Bike
- Don S. Davis as Veterinarian

== Production ==
At the time, Watchers was the most expensive U.S. production to take advantage of Canadian Tax Shelter laws.

== Release ==
=== Theatrical ===
The film was given a limited release in the United States by Universal Pictures in December 1988.

=== Home media ===
It was released on VHS and LaserDisc by International Video Entertainment in 1989.

Artisan Entertainment released the film as a double feature with Watchers 2 on DVD in 2003. The DVD was presented in full frame with no bonus features and is now out of print. Toy Robot Video, a subdivision label of Arrow Video, is scheduled to release the film on Blu-ray on October 20, 2026.

== Reception ==
=== Box office ===
It grossed $940,173 at the U.S. box office.

=== Critical response ===
On the review aggregator website Rotten Tomatoes, 17% of 6 critics' reviews are positive.

Film critic Leonard Maltin awarded the film one and a half out of a possible four stars, calling it "awful" and criticized the film's monster as being "ludicrous".

In his review published on Bloody Disgusting in 2026, Paul Lê rated it 4 out of 5 stars, and wrote, "fans can attest to there being an almost uncanny quality about Watchers that makes it tremendously entertaining, regardless of its glaring shortcomings."

== Sequels ==
Despite there being no sequel novels by Koontz, producer Roger Corman has released three sequels - Watchers II, Watchers 3 and Watchers Reborn.
