= My Date with Drew =

- Film poster
- Directed by: Jon Gunn; Brian Herzlinger; Brett Winn
- Produced by: Kerry David; Jon Gunn; Brian Herzlinger; Clark Peterson; Brett Winn
- Starring: Brian Herzlinger; Drew Barrymore; Eric Roberts; Corey Feldman; Lily Rains
- Edited by: Jon Gunn; Brian Herzlinger; Brett Winn
- Music by: Stuart Hart; Steven M. Stern
- Distributed by: DEJ Productions
- Release date: August 5, 2005
- Running time: 90 minutes
- Country: United States
- Language: English
- Budget: $1,100
- Box office: $262,770

My Date with Drew is a 2004 American independent documentary film edited, produced, shot, and directed by Brian Herzlinger, who also stars in it. It uses guerrilla filmmaking and received several awards.

== Synopsis ==
Since he first saw E.T. the Extra-Terrestrial as a boy, Herzlinger has had a crush on its star Drew Barrymore. Now, more than 20 years later, Herzlinger combines his passions for filmmaking and Drew Barrymore to document his quest for a date with the actress. With $1,100 he won at a game show (the winning answer being "Drew Barrymore") and a digital video camera, he has 30 days to complete his documentary before he has to return the camera under Circuit City's 30-day return policy.

== Reception ==
=== Critical response ===
On the review aggregator website Rotten Tomatoes, 71% of 63 critics' reviews are positive, with an average rating of 6.3/10. The website's consensus reads: "A love-it-or-hate-it stalkerazzi documentary, My Date With Drew effectively draws on America's celeb-obsessed pop culture so that viewers either unabashedly identify with it, or are filing restraining orders on Drew Barrymore's behalf." Metacritic, which uses a weighted average, assigned the film a score of 51 out of 100, based on 21 critics, indicating "mixed or average" reviews.

=== Awards ===
- 2004 Gen Art Film Festival – Audience Award
- 2004 U.S. Comedy Arts Festival – Audience Award
- 2004 Vail Film Festival – Festival Award
