= Life 101 =

- VHS cover
- Directed by: Redge Mahaffey
- Written by: Redge Mahaffey
- Produced by: Gary A. Lowe
- Starring: Corey Haim; Ami Dolenz; Keith Coogan
- Music by: Arthur Kent
- Distributed by: Monarch Home Video
- Release date: May 17, 1995
- Running time: 93 min.
- Country: United States
- Language: English

Life 101 is a 1995 American direct-to-video comedy-drama film, starring Corey Haim, Keith Coogan and Ami Dolenz.

== Plot summary ==
A college freshman Ramsy experiences love for the first time in the 1960s when he asks out Joy.

== Cast ==
- Corey Haim as Ramsy
- Ami Dolenz as Joy
- Keith Coogan as Buck
- Louis Mandylor as Donnie
- Kyle Cody as Lance
- Skip Schwink as Ryan Hall Dormmate
- Tim Kahle as Ryan Hall Dormmate
- Martin Dorden as Ryan Hall Dormmate

== Filming locations ==
Filmed at the University of Maryland, College Park.
