= George McCluskey (actor) =

British actor

George McCluskey (b. Coventry, England) is a British actor.
