= Prayer of the Rollerboys =

1991 American action and sci-fi film

- Theatrical release poster
- Directed by: Rick King
- Written by: W. Peter Iliff
- Produced by: Robert Mickelson
- Starring: Corey Haim; Patricia Arquette; Christopher Collet; Julius Harris; Josh Todhunter
- Cinematography: Phedon Papamichael Jr.
- Music by: Stacy Widelitz
- Production companies: Gaga Communications; Fox Lorber; Academy Entertainment; JVC; TV Tokyo
- Distributed by: Castle Hill Productions
- Release date: August 30, 1991
- Running time: 95 minutes
- Country: United States
- Language: English
- Budget: $2.4 million

Prayer of the Rollerboys is a 1991 independent action and science fiction film directed by Rick King and starring Corey Haim and Patricia Arquette. Griffin played by Haim is approached by his childhood neighbor Gary Lee, who is now the leader of a white supremacist skater gang and convinces Griffin's younger brother to join them. Griffin becomes an undercover cop and tries to remain unnoticed.

The film was funded by Japanese investors as they believed it could become successful due to its easy to understand screenplay and its rollerblading aspect. It was filmed around Los Angeles. It received mixed reviews from critics.

== Plot ==
Griffin, an accomplished inline skater, works as a delivery boy in near-future dystopian Los Angeles. The city is overrun with poverty, crime, and drug use, and is considered one of the United States' only free territories in the wake of "The Great Crash": an economic catastrophe triggered by the greed of previous generations that has severely crippled the United States and left its properties up for grabs by foreign corporations and interests. Its effects are echoed by ominous events referenced throughout the film, including: news reports of riots in Washington D.C. (due to the armed forces going on strike); a television ad announcing that Harvard University and the Ivy League was moved to Japan, followed by a question from one of the characters if "there will be any Universities left in America"; a newspaper headline that proclaims "GERMANY BUYS POLAND"; and references to the Vatican hiring the Israel Defense Forces to "clean up" Northern Ireland.

A heavily armed white supremacist skater gang and underground conglomerate known as the Rollerboys fight for control of the decaying city. Their director is young, charismatic narcotics kingpin Gary Lee, a childhood neighbor of Griffin's, who's also rumored to be the great-grandson of Adolf Hitler. The Rollerboys carry out their mission of restoring Anglo-America's former greatness, through violent battles with other gangs, and through the distribution of "Heaven Mist", a designer drug. Griffin's younger brother Miltie, who idolizes the Rollerboys, takes a job with them pushing mist on the streets; eventually, Miltie starts using it himself. Then, Casey, an undercover cop, recruits Griffin to join the Rollerboys as a mole in exchange for a better life.

Griffin is initiated but his loyalty to the Rollerboys is soon called into question. In order to prove himself, he unknowingly pummels Speedbagger, his and Miltie's Afro-American landlord and legal guardian, nearly to death. Shortly thereafter, Griffin discovers the chilling truth behind the Rollerboys' mantra "The Day of the Rope is coming". Rope turns out to be a toxic mist-additive, developed by the Rollerboys, which gradually renders its users sterile; the purpose of this is to "eliminate the weak", removing future generations of the "junkie" population, and eventually, the minority population, thus giving the Rollerboys free rein over their concepts of a thriving American society.

Upon getting the Mist lab shut down, and in a concluding chase to stop Gary Lee, Griffin has Gary arrested. In the end, Griffin, Miltie, Speedbagger, and Casey move out of Los Angeles to Portland in order to a start a new life, away from their old ties. Gary buys his way out of prison and decides to trail Griffin, ending the movie in a sequel hook.

== Cast ==
- Corey Haim as Griffin
- Patricia Arquette as Detective Casey, LAPD
- Christopher Collet as Gary Lee
- Julius Harris as "Speedbagger"
- Devin Clark as Miltie
- Mark Pellegrino as Bango, Rollerboy Lieutenant
- Morgan Weisser as Bullwinkle, Rollerboy Lieutenant
- J.C. Quinn as Lieutenant Jaworski, LAPD
- Aron Eisenberg as Teen Boy
- Jake Dengel as Detective Tyler, LAPD
- G. Smokey Campbell as Detective Watt, LAPD
- John P. Connolly as Pinky, A Local Pizzeria Owner
- Dal Trader as Sergeant
- John-Michael Steele as Officer Rogers (uncredited)

== Production ==
On 25 October 1989, it was announced by Daily Variety that Japanese companies Gaga Communications, TV Tokyo, and the Victor Company were negotiating a deal with Academy Entertainment and American distributor Skouras Pictures to produce Prayer of the Rollerboys. Japanese investors believed the screenplay was easy to understand and that its emphasis on rollerblading gave it the commercial appeal needed for success. Photography began on 8 March 1990 and continued into the following month. The film was shot in Los Angeles, mainly based in Venice, however also including the Vincent Thomas Bridge alongside Santa Monica and areas around the Los Angeles Harbor. The film costed $2,400,000 (now $6,233,557) to make. Of the weapons in this movie that were used, Gary Lee can be seen carrying a Smith & Wesson Model 3913 semi-automatic pistol. Furthermore, many rollerboys carried M16 rifles and later on buy Ruger Mini-14s.

Writer W. Peter Iliff described his story as "A Clockwork Orange meets Blade Runner via the Lord of the Flies".

== Release ==
The movie premiered on 30 August 1991 in Los Angeles presented under Gaga Communications, Fox Lorber, Academy Entertainment, JVC, and TV Tokyo, and released by Castle Hill Productions.

== Reception ==
British critic Derek Winnert stated that "The impact of screenwriter W Peter Iliff’s distinctly weird and intriguing premise is gradually eroded by the eventually unsurprising developments in its interestingly outlandish storyline and also by the over-familiarity of the usual, regulation futuristic setting of a chaotic, dystopian tomorrow’s world, but the low-budget production is pepped up nicely by receiving sparky, imaginative handling by King and Haim’s sterling performance, proving a little star. Patricia Arquette, J C Quinn, Julius Harris, Devin Clark and Mark Pellegrino also help out, and there is definitely some wild fun to be found here." American film critic Leonard Maltin gave the film 2.5 out of 4 stars, stating that the movie consists of a "provocative idea weakened by needlessly excessive violence—and a painfully predictable ending".

An editor at Time Out called the movie a "tame, teen-movie rip-off of - among others - Red Dawn, A Clockwork Orange and Surf Nazis Must Die" and stated that "the violence is toned down, the sex innocuous, the interest level zero". English film critic Kim Newman working for Empire gave the film 2 out of 5 stars and wrote that it's "Not great by any means, but compared to budding teen idol Haim's last star vehicle, the utterly mediocre Fast Getaway, this is almost class act status" and that "The various scenes featuring the gang gliding along the streets en masse in their stylish cream duster coats also have a certain idiotic charm and there's a fair amount of brutal action worked neatly into the proceedings".

American film critic Kenneth Turan for the Los Angeles Times said that the movie "is reminiscent of those feisty low-budget exploitation films of the 1950s and ‘60s produced by folks like Roger Corman and Samuel Z. Arkoff for American International Pictures and that "What it lacks in terms of plot (comic book all the way) and acting (indifferent at best), it just about manages to make up for in spunky kinetic pizzaz". He also believed it likely took big inspiration from 1968 Wild in the Streets.

== Accolades ==
Prayer of the Rollerboys was nominated in the 18th Saturn Awards for Best Science Fiction Film and Best Performance by a Younger Actor.
