= Corey Haim =

Canadian actor (1971–2010)

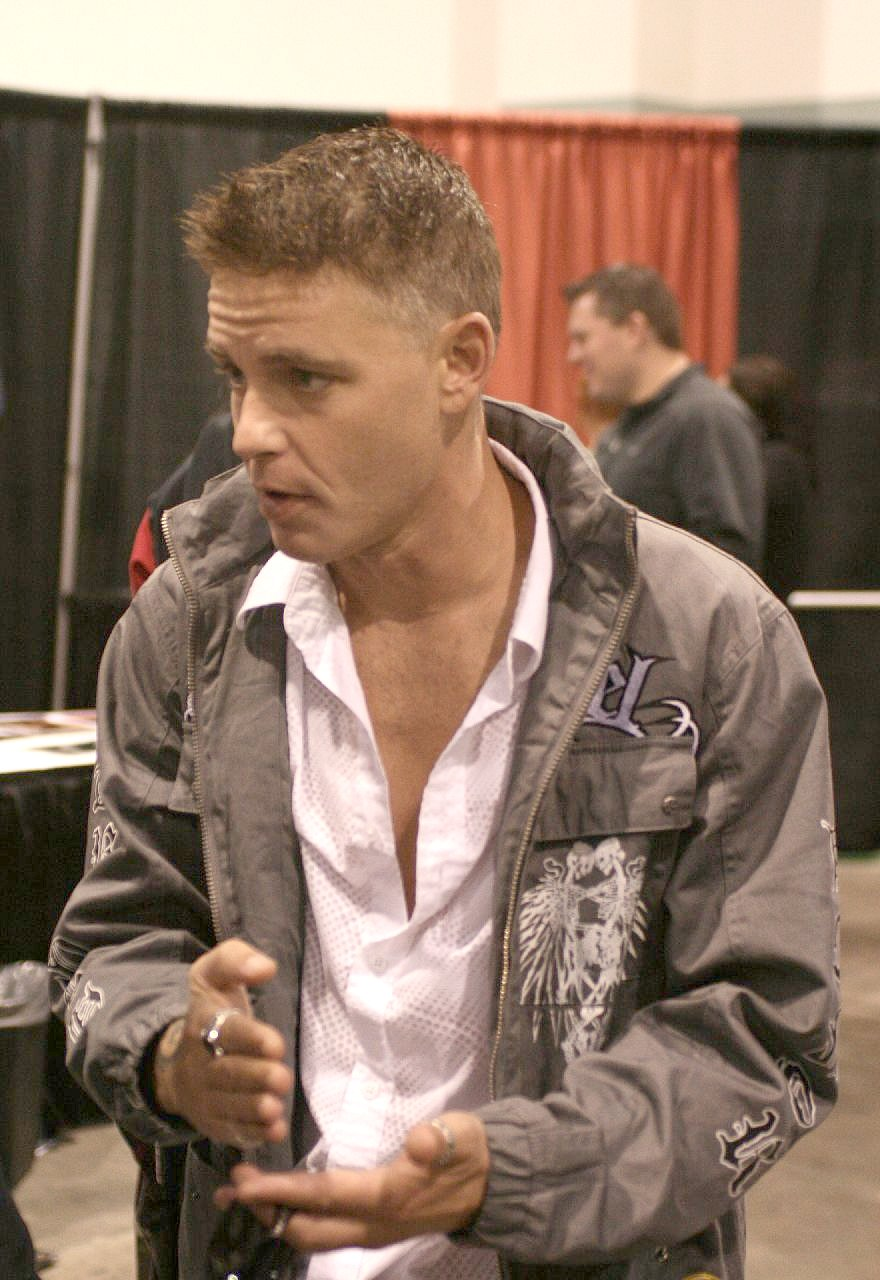
- Haim in 2008
- Born: Corey Ian Haim; December 23, 1971; Toronto, Ontario, Canada
- Died: March 10, 2010 (aged 38); Burbank, California, U.S.
- Resting place: Pardes Shalom Cemetery, Vaughan, Ontario, Canada
- Occupation: Actor
- Years active: 1981–2010

Corey Ian Haim (December 23, 1971 – March 10, 2010) was a Canadian actor who rose to fame in the 1980s as a teen heartthrob. He starred in Silver Bullet (1985), Murphy's Romance (1985), Lucas (1986), License to Drive (1988) and Dream a Little Dream (1989). His role in The Lost Boys (1987) made him a household name.

Known as The Two Coreys, Haim and Corey Feldman became 1980s icons and appeared together in seven films, later starring in the A&E American reality show The Two Coreys. Haim's early success led to money and fame. He had difficulty breaking away from the trauma of his experience as a child actor and struggled with substance abuse. He faced numerous challenges in his adult life, including financial difficulties and ongoing battles with addiction. He died of pneumonia on March 10, 2010.

== Early life ==
Haim was born on December 23, 1971, in Toronto, Ontario, the son of Judy Haim, an Israeli-born data processor, and Bernie Haim, who worked in sales. In 1982, his parents divorced after 18 years of marriage. He had an older sister, Cari, and a younger half-brother, Daniel Lee, from his father's second marriage. Haim was Jewish; his Hebrew name was Yechezkel Yehudah.

Haim was raised in Chomedey, Laval, Quebec, (a suburb of Montreal), and, later, Willowdale and Thornhill, Ontario (suburbs of Toronto). There, his mother enrolled him in drama classes in improvisation and mime to help him overcome his shyness. Haim's skill as a hockey player led to his being scouted for the AA Thunderbirds. Haim attended several schools in both Thornhill, Ontario, and North York, Ontario, including North York's Zion Heights Junior High, up until the eighth grade.

== Career ==
=== Early acting career ===
After accompanying his sister Cari to auditions, Haim was noticed and was offered roles as a child actor. He began performing in commercials in 1981. Later, he played the role of Larry in the Canadian children's educational comedy television series The Edison Twins. Haim made his feature film debut in the 1984 thriller Firstborn as a boy whose family comes under threat from his mother's violent boyfriend, played by Peter Weller. Haim's first day of shooting was with Weller, and he attempted to compliment the older actor on his "convincingly psychotic" performance. Weller grabbed Haim by the collar, threw him up against a wall, and demanded that the terrified Haim never speak to him after a take. It took three assistants to separate them. Weller apologized to Haim, saying method acting caused his actions.

In 1985, Haim appeared in supporting roles in Secret Admirer and Murphy's Romance, the latter with Sally Field, of whom he was reportedly in awe. Also in 1985, he had the leading role in Silver Bullet, Stephen King's feature adaptation of his own lycanthropic novella; Haim played a paraplegic 10-year-old boy who warns his uncle, played by Gary Busey, that their town is being terrorized by a werewolf. Haim began to gain industry recognition, earning his first Young Artist Award for the NBC movie A Time to Live, in which he played Liza Minnelli's character's dying son. At the time, Haim's father was acting as his manager. He turned down a role for Haim in The Mosquito Coast, which was later taken by River Phoenix. Producer Stanley Jaffe approached the father to remark on Haim's gifts, and recommended that he get an agent in Los Angeles.

=== Hollywood teen stardom ===
Haim's breakout role came in 1986, when he starred with Kerri Green, Charlie Sheen, and Winona Ryder as the titular character in Lucas. The coming-of-age story about first love and teen angst centers on an intelligent misfit who struggles for acceptance after falling for a cheerleader. Haim fell in love with Green, who played his love interest in the film. Haim's unrequited love for Green helped inspire his performance, with the real-life dynamics between them being expressed on screen. Director David Seltzer noticed that unlike some of his peers, Haim seemed at ease with his burgeoning heartthrob status: "He took it in stride. Not in a negative way, but he was something of a magnet and he knew it."

Haim read for River Phoenix's role in Stand By Me while eating lunch in director Rob Reiner's backyard; he was offered the part the same day that he was offered the lead role in Lucas. He later said he would not have changed his decision. Haim was nominated for a Young Artist Award for his performance as Lucas, and film critic Roger Ebert gave him a glowing review: "He creates one of the most three-dimensional, complicated, interesting characters of any age in any recent movie. If he can continue to act this well, he will never become a half-forgotten child star, but will continue to grow into an important actor. He is that good." Following Lucas, Haim moved to Los Angeles and starred in the short-lived 1987 television series Roomies with Burt Young.

In 1987, Haim had a featured role as Sam Emerson, a comic-reading teen turned vampire hunter, in Joel Schumacher's The Lost Boys. Though he had seen Lucas, Schumacher was not sold on casting Haim. However, upon meeting Haim, Schumacher changed his mind. The young cast of The Lost Boys included Jason Patric, Kiefer Sutherland, Jami Gertz, and Corey Feldman, and the set was lively. The Lost Boys was well received by most critics, made over $32 million at the U.S. box office, and is regarded as a 1980s classic. The performance earned Haim another Young Artist Award nomination as Best Young Male Superstar in a Motion Picture. The film marked the beginning of Haim's recurring on-screen partnership with Feldman. The two young actors had previously become aware of one another when Haim auditioned for the role of Mouth in The Goonies, which Feldman secured. "The Two Coreys" ascended to become the highest-paid teen stars of the 1980s.

In the era of Tiger Beat and Bop, Haim was a favored cover star. His trademark lopsided smile prompted his Never Too Late co-star Cloris Leachman to admonish him: "You know, that smirk you have is cute, but sometimes it looks a little fake. I would definitely practice closing your mouth a little more."

In License to Drive (1988), which co-starred Feldman and Heather Graham, Haim played the lead role of Les, whose love life is crippled by a lack of a car. Les achieves his wish-fulfillment fantasy of turning his life around on one wild night. "There were some shenanigans behind the scenes," remarked director Greg Beeman of the indulgences of the Two Coreys. "They would disappear sometimes, but they always showed up for work." At the time of the shoot, 16-year-old Haim only had a learner's permit, requiring an adult to be concealed in the back seat of the Cadillac he drove in the movie. The film featured Haim's signature ad-libbing at its height. Haim was receiving nearly 2,000 fan letters a week and worked to avoid the potentially "psycho" girls who circled the block where he lived in an apartment downstairs from his mother's. License to Drive won Haim his second Young Artist Award, tying with Feldman for the Best Young Actor in a Motion Picture Comedy or Fantasy award. The film grossed over $22 million domestically. Haim later said that License to Drive was his "breaking point" for becoming addicted to drugs.

Haim starred in the horror film Watchers, adapted from the Dean R. Koontz novel. He played a teen who befriends a highly intelligent dog altered by military research, leading to the two being pursued. Haim and Feldman next teamed in the metaphysical romantic comedy Dream a Little Dream. Four days before the shoot commenced on January 7, 1988, Haim broke his leg. His character's injury was added to accommodate his cast and resulting limp. After the cast was removed two weeks later, Haim was required to wear a false one for the remainder of the shoot. He semi-improvised his scenes in the film.

=== Personal and career troubles ===
On April 9, 1989, Haim appeared live onstage at Knott's Berry Farm with DJ "Hollywood" Hamilton as part of a teen anti-drugs campaign. The thousand-strong audience of girls would not stop screaming and rushing the stage, and fire marshals had to escort Haim from the building amid fears for his safety. Haim later said that he was terrified of going onstage afterward, and had resolved never to go on any stage ever again.

In November 1989, fresh out of rehabilitation, Haim released a self-promotional video titled Corey Haim: Me, Myself, and I, which followed a day in his life. Heavily scripted, Haim's monologues to camera were nevertheless unfocused and suggested that he was under the influence during filming. The film has been considered the "worst movie ever" by X-Entertainment. Haim set up a pre-recorded drug advice line for teens. He admitted on The Arsenio Hall Show that he was high while giving the advice.

In 1990, Haim co-starred with Patricia Arquette in the sci-fi actioner Prayer of the Rollerboys, performing many of his own stunts in a tale of a teen who goes undercover to expose a racist gang leader. However, as his problems with drugs continued, Haim began to lose his core audience. His performances suffered, and his film career in the 1990s declined into direct-to-video releases. In 1991, aged 19, he starred in Dream Machine, which received a direct-to-video release, as did Oh, What a Night and The Double 0 Kid, in which Seth Green had a role. Green said his experiences of working with Haim was a duality between a sweet, hardworking professional who loved acting and a tormented addict.

Additional direct-to-video films included the 1992 erotic thriller Blown Away. Co-star Nicole Eggert, who was romantically involved with Haim at the time and also featured in The Double O Kid, later stated that on-set medics would provide him with drugs to stop him from going through withdrawal. She recalled filming with Haim during the day and spending the nights with him in the emergency room.

In 1994, Haim visited Mannheim, Germany, to sign a deal with the German record label Edel and recorded an album there. However, the deal fell through and the album remained unreleased. One of the songs, the euro-house influenced "You Give Me Everything", produced by Daniel Schubert and Daniel Gonschorek, was released in 1995 as a 4-track single. Over the next two years, Haim released sequels to two of his older films, 1994's Fast Getaway II along with National Lampoon's Last Resort, 1995's Life 101, and Dream a Little Dream 2 with Feldman. Haim also unsuccessfully auditioned for the role of Robin in Joel Schumacher's Batman Forever.

Brooke McCarter managed Haim through the mid-1990s, but, citing drug problems, eventually dropped him. In 1996, Haim starred in four more direct-to-video films — Snowboard Academy, Demolition High, Fever Lake and Busted — the last also co-starring and directed by Corey Feldman. Feldman was forced to fire Haim after he refused to curtail his drug use and was inconsistent on set, later saying that it was one of the hardest things he ever had to do. He had a small role in the television film Merlin: The Quest Begins. In 1997, he appeared in Never Too Late and the sequel to Demolition High, titled Demolition University, on which he was credited as an executive producer.

After Haim pulled out of the film Paradise Bar, he was sued by Lloyd's of London for $375,000 for failing to disclose his drug addiction as a pre-existing medical condition on the insurance form. In July 1997, he filed for Chapter 11 bankruptcy protection. At this point, Haim's film roles evaporated.

In 1999, Haim shot a troubled low-budget independent film called Universal Groove in Montreal, using then-emerging digital technology. He played a film director interacting with eight characters over the course of one night on the techno club scene. Haim's return to Canada was newsworthy, with the shoot garnering local press interest and reporters from People magazine visiting the set. The film experienced fatal post-production problems, and stolen footage was leaked on the Internet. Over eight years later, the filmmakers self-released a reconstructed version of the film online.

In 2000, Haim attempted to return to the industry with the direct-to-video thriller Without Malice, with Jennifer Beals and Craig Sheffer. He hoped that playing the role of an ex-addict who conceals a murder with his sister's fiancé would offer him a transition from teen fare. The film was made in Waskesiu, Saskatchewan, where crew members recalled Haim's propping up the town's only bar until the early hours. In 2001, Haim was the subject of an E! True Hollywood Story. Airing on October 17, it showed him living in a sparse apartment above a garage in Santa Monica with his mother. Haim was disoriented and unintelligible for some of his interviews. He was seen compiling a promotional clip reel for casting agents, and a pawnbroker recalled his begging for $3 to buy a slice of pizza. Feldman spoke on the program about his attempts to help Haim kick the habit, and moved him into his house in October 2001.

Able to poke fun at himself, Haim made a cameo appearance in David Spade's Dickie Roberts: Former Child Star, a film about a former child star, which included an array of actual former child stars, including Feldman. Haim also appeared in spoof horror movie The Back Lot Murders. In 2002, he guest-starred as himself in an episode of the Canadian television series Big Wolf on Campus. Haim was the subject of a 2004 song by the Irish band The Thrills called "Whatever Happened to Corey Haim?"

=== The Two Coreys and final years ===
In 2006, Haim was ranked #8 on VH1's list of the Greatest Teen Stars. In December 2006, Haim began taping a reality show titled The Two Coreys, which reunited him with Feldman. Both were credited as executive producers, and had a measure of creative input. The show premiered on the A&E Network on July 29, 2007, with a second season starting on June 22, 2008. At its advent, Haim bought himself and Feldman matching Tiffany rings. The show's premise revolved around Haim living in Feldman's house with Feldman and Feldman's wife while trying to get his career back on track. The dynamics of the threesome were conceived in the style of the film You, Me and Dupree. Footage showed the ravages of Haim's habit on his body, and his appearance was unrecognizable. Although acknowledged as partially scripted, the show eventually took on a darker life of its own after Haim relapsed and his prescription drug abuse became apparent.

In one of the darkest moments of The Two Coreys, Haim told Feldman that he had been sexually abused at the age of 14 by one of Feldman's acquaintances. Declining to identify his molester (a 42-year-old man), Haim said that the abuse had continued for two years with Feldman's knowledge. This disclosure led to a further rift between Haim and Feldman, and the show continued to expose the darker side of their lives as teen stars. The disintegrating relationship between the former best friends prompted a six-month hiatus before the second season. Haim was nominated for a Viewer's Choice Award at the 22nd Annual Gemini Awards in Canada for his role in the show.

On February 7, 2008, Haim ran a paid advertisement in the Hollywood trade publication Variety with a full-page photo, stating: "This is not a stunt. I'm back. I'm ready to work. I'm ready to make amends". In February 2008, filming commenced in Vancouver for Lost Boys: The Tribe, a direct-to-DVD sequel featuring few of the original cast. Haim wept when he was told on-camera that there was no role for him in the film. He later was scheduled to film a cameo appearance, but turned up on the set obviously under the influence and was unable to remember his lines. A&E canceled The Two Coreys midway through its second season in July 2008.

Amid the Two Coreys' well-publicized estrangement came unconfirmed reports that Warner Bros. planned to release a Lost Boys 3—with their characters facing off. Feldman was confirmed to star in and act as executive producer of Lost Boys: The Thirst. In July 2008, Haim completed filming on the gambling comedy Shark City in Toronto with Vivica A. Fox, Carlo Rota and David Phillips. Haim and G Tom Mac developed an idea for a reality show called Lost Boy Found, documenting Haim's addiction and recovery through music at Mac's studio, where he had been given a place to stay. Mac pledged that if Haim stayed clean, he would allow him to come on tour and perform with him. A pilot was filmed, but the show was not picked up.

In 2009, Crank: High Voltage was released, which saw Haim sporting a blonde mullet alongside Jason Statham, Amy Smart, and Dwight Yoakam. Haim completed two films scheduled for a 2010 release: the thriller American Sunset, in which he played a man who is abducted in the search for his missing wife, and Decisions, shot in December 2009, in which his character is a cop working with troubled kids. American Sunset wrapped in New Brunswick, Canada, on June 18, 2009. Haim was attached to several films scheduled to go into production in 2010. In his final days, he was working on The Dead Sea, a film in which mercenaries on a naval ship are trapped by zombies. He requested a "clean set" from producers to reduce temptation, although his fellow cast members commented on his hyperactivity and need for attention. Haim came to the set on his days off.

== Personal life ==
Following the release of The Lost Boys, Haim visibly embraced the privileges of his new-found fame, becoming a regular at Alphy's Soda Pop Club, a private nightclub for underage actors at the Hollywood Roosevelt Hotel.

In February 1993, Michael Bass reported to police that Haim had threatened him during an argument. Haim was arrested. According to Haim's publicist at the time, he was shooting BB guns at a target in his backyard while trying to fire Bass, who refused to accept that he was being let go. Initially investigated as a terrorist threat (a felony), Haim's charge was downgraded to the misdemeanor of exhibiting a replica handgun in a threatening manner. Feldman posted Haim's $250 bail.

=== Substance abuse ===
Haim struggled with substance abuse for most of his life. He was already drinking beer in his early teens on the set of Lucas in 1985. A year later, he tried marijuana on the set of The Lost Boys. Haim asserted that the filming of License to Drive was his "breaking point" for becoming addicted to drugs. On his return from a Hawaiian family vacation in May 1989, Haim told the press that he had been clean for a month after going cold turkey without the help of a substance-abuse program.

Haim received drug rehabilitation in 1989.

Haim's Blown Away co-star Nicole Eggert, who was romantically involved with Haim, later stated that on-set medics would provide him with drugs to stop him from going through withdrawal. She recalled spending nights with Haim in the emergency room in which Haim was "hooked up to an IV, begging doctors for a different prescription".

Brooke McCarter managed Haim through the mid-1990s, but, citing drug problems, eventually dropped him. McCarter was dating Oscar-winning producer Julia Phillips, who termed the assignment "babysitting". In her memoir, Phillips recalled Haim's asking her permission to take out her daughter, and the moral conflict she experienced while smoking marijuana in front of him, saying: "Mixed feelings about Corey. Love him. Detest him too, or at least the manipulative part that knew how to make people twice his age snap to. Are you really only eighteen? Who writes your dialogue?"

During the filming of Without Malice (2000), Haim would reportedly halt production to call Toronto and check to see if his dog was dead. Haim also obtained emergency prescriptions during this time.

By 2001, Haim had sought rehabilitation 15 times for his drug addiction. He was placed on prescription medication, which he began to abuse. On August 10, 2001, his mother found him unconscious at his Los Angeles bungalow. He was rushed to the UCLA Medical Center where doctors managed to stabilize him. Two weeks earlier, from July 23, 2001, Haim had spent some time in Sherman Oaks Hospital.

In 2001, Haim was the subject of an E! True Hollywood Story. Airing on October 17, it showed him living in a sparse apartment above a garage in Santa Monica with his mother. Haim was disoriented and unintelligible for some of his interviews. Feldman spoke on the program about his attempts to help Haim kick the habit, and moved him into his house in October 2001.

Feldman said of Haim: "He made so many attempts at suicide. He's OD'd so many times. I mean, I can't begin to tell you, having him foaming at the mouth, coming downstairs and finding him that way and drooling and not able to speak, and me, having to put charcoal down his throat so that he could breathe."

Haim stated that at one point, he did not leave his apartment for three and a half years and ballooned from 150 to 302 pounds.

By 2004, Haim appeared to have overcome his drug habit after his mother persuaded him to return to Toronto with her and resettle there.

Feldman vowed that he would no longer speak to Haim until he got clean. On The Two Coreys, Feldman and his wife, along with two other former teen stars, called on Haim in an effort to get him to admit he needed help. Feldman added that he did not consider Haim to be "a safe person to have around my wife and child at the moment". After his falling-out with Feldman, Haim had a car accident while under the influence and walked out for good on the show's therapist. Publicly severing his ties with Haim, Feldman stated: "I am not going to watch him destroy himself." (Before his death, Haim reconciled with Feldman off-camera.)

On the advice of his lawyer, Haim went to a physician in California with the goal of sticking to a program to wean off pills without multiple doctors to demonstrate that he was working toward getting clean. Haim's agent stated that his doctor was reluctant to drop Haim from his then-current medication level to zero pills, fearing a seizure; Haim went to an addiction specialist to get mental help.

=== Relationships ===
Haim never married and had no children. He was involved with Who's the Boss? actress Alyssa Milano from 1987 to 1990. Milano and her parents, together with his manager at the time, unsuccessfully tried to get Haim help for his addiction.

Lala Sloatman co-starred with Haim in Watchers (1988) and Dream a Little Dream (1989), and they dated on and off for two years at the peak of his fame.

Haim was engaged to Baywatch actress Nicole Eggert, with whom he starred in Blown Away (1992) and Just One of the Girls (1993). Eggert is credited with helping to save Haim's life at least once by taking him to the hospital to detox during a "narcotic rush". Eggert once said: "I spent a lot of nights in emergency rooms with him. I don't think that I saved his life, I just think that I was there for him".

Haim was briefly engaged to actress Holly Fields in 1996 and to model Cindy Guyer in 2000.

Haim had a year-long relationship with actress Tiffany Shepis. In October 2008, he stated that the two were engaged and due to marry on May 9, 2009.

At the time of his death, Haim was in a relationship with reality star Daisy de la Hoya.

=== Finances ===
In December 1992, Haim partnered in a lease-option on a 1922 Hancock Park mansion with his business manager, a party promoter named Michael Bass who had served two years in jail after a conviction for fraud. The 7,000-square-foot (650 m^{2}) house was valued at $1.35M. Bass rushed through the deal in order to hold a fund-raiser at the house to buy toys for Russian children, later revealed to be a scam. Haim lived at the house with Bass and his mother.

In 1996, Haim nearly went broke after he pulled out of the film Paradise Bar. He was sued by Lloyd's of London for $375,000 for failing to disclose his drug addiction as a pre-existing medical condition on the insurance form. In July 1997, Haim filed for Chapter 11 bankruptcy protection. According to the bankruptcy report, he owed $100,000 to the IRS, and had $100,000 in outstanding debts. His listed assets included $100 in cash, the red 1987 Alfa Romeo Spider featured in Corey Haim: Me, Myself, and I, $750 worth of clothing, a $31,000 pension fund, and royalty rights worth $7,500.

In the early 2000s, Haim attempted to support himself by selling clumps of his hair and an extracted molar on eBay. The tooth reached $150 before being pulled from the listings in line with eBay's restrictions on the sale of body parts.

By late July 2008, Haim had become destitute and homeless in Los Angeles. He was taken in by singer-songwriter Gerard McMahon.

=== Friendship with Corey Feldman ===
During the filming of The Lost Boys, Haim bonded with Corey Feldman as they stayed in the hotel watching movies and visited the local arcade. The two were close friends. They became known as "The Two Coreys" and achieved mainstream fame and notoriety as teen idols.

The Two Coreys went on to star in multiple films together. However, both Feldman and Haim experienced career downturns due to drug use.

The Two Coreys, a reality show about The Two Coreys, aired on the A&E Network from 2007 to 2008.

Haim and Feldman had a number of disagreements in Haim's later years. Many of these disputes occurred due to Haim's drug use, which was documented in the reality series The Two Coreys. Before his death, Haim reconciled with Feldman off-camera. The two were spending time together developing a sequel to License to Drive called License to Fly, a project of Haim's conception.

=== Abuse claims ===
In an episode of The Two Coreys, Haim revealed that he had been sexually abused at the age of 14. Declining to identify his molester, Haim said that the abuse had continued for two years with Feldman's knowledge. This public disclosure led to a further rift between Haim and Feldman, and the show continued to expose the darker side of their lives as teen stars.

In 2011, after Haim's death, Feldman stated that a "Hollywood mogul" who abused Haim was to blame for his death. Feldman's 2013 memoir, Coreyography, stated that he and Haim suffered sexual abuse as young actors in the film industry. Feldman stated that during the filming of Lucas, Haim "had been tricked into engaging in a painful session of anal sex by a man on the movie set. The man told Haim that sex between men and boys was normal in Hollywood". Feldman reported that after this experience, Haim suggested that he and Feldman engage in sexual relations, and Feldman declined.

In 2016, Judy Haim threatened to sue Feldman. Haim claimed that many of his statements were false and added that Feldman was looking for attention and money. In 2017, Judy Haim again spoke out against Feldman, who was seeking $10 million to make a documentary exposing those who had allegedly sexually abused him and her son; Judy Haim referred to Feldman as a "scam artist".

In a 2017 interview from the National Enquirer, actor Dominick Brascia alleged that Charlie Sheen was the person who had raped Haim on the set of Lucas. Sheen would have been 19 at the time of the alleged attack, while Haim would have been 13. Sheen denied these allegations and filed a lawsuit against the National Enquirer that was settled in 2018. In a 2017 interview on The Dr. Oz Show, Judy Haim denied that Charlie Sheen was sexually involved with her son and accused Brascia, who died in 2018, of having sexually abused him.

In March 2020, Feldman's documentary, My Truth: The Rape of 2 Coreys, was released. Feldman alleged that Sheen had raped Haim and added that Haim had described the incident in graphic detail. These claims were backed up in the documentary by Jamison Newlander, Haim's friend and co-star in The Lost Boys, and Feldman's ex-wife Susie Sprague. Feldman accused Brascia of having sexually abused Haim as well. Feldman also spoke out against Judy Haim's attacks on his credibility. Sheen's publicist denied the abuse allegations.

=== Retracted abuse claims by Feldman ===
In the December 2025 documentary Corey Feldman vs. The World, Feldman alleged that Haim had sexually molested him during the time they were acting in the 1987 film The Lost Boys. Feldman also stated that Haim informed him that it was Charlie Sheen who told him that such behavior "was OK." On December 20, 2025, via a statement from lawyers, Feldman withdrew his claim that Haim had sexually molested him.

== Death ==
On March 10, 2010, after Haim's mother called 911, paramedics took Haim from their home to Providence Saint Joseph Medical Center in Burbank, where he was pronounced dead at 2:15 a.m. He was 38 years old. The 10-minute 911 call made by Haim's mother was leaked on the Internet. Haim had been ill with flu-like symptoms for two days before his death. A doctor called on him and took his temperature, but did not suspect serious problems. Assistant Chief Coroner Ed Winter said: "As he got out of bed, he felt a little weak and went down to the floor on his knees."

Los Angeles police initially stated that Haim's death appeared to be an accidental overdose; bottles containing Valium, Vicodin, Soma (a muscle relaxant), and Haloperidol (an antipsychotic) were retrieved. It emerged that Haim had used illegal aliases to procure over 553 prescription pills in the 32 days before his death, having "doctor-shopped" seven different physicians and used seven pharmacies to obtain the supply. The pills included 195 Valium, 149 Vicodin, 194 Soma and 15 Xanax. Haim's agent discounted the possibility of an overdose, citing his recent drive toward clean living and affirming that he had been completely drug-free for two weeks. However, Haim's primary doctor confirmed to Drug Enforcement Administration investigators that Haim was addicted to pain medication.

California Attorney General Jerry Brown announced that his office was investigating Haim's death, saying an unauthorized prescription in his name had been found among fraudulent prescription pads ordered from San Diego County. On March 17, 2010, Brown announced that an arrest was made in connection with the investigation, which involved doctor-identity theft and up to 5,000 illegal prescriptions. While detailed information was not released, officials stated that Haim had obtained Oxycontin via a prescription drug ring. Records showed he had received thousands of pills over the last year of his life, using physicians at offices, urgent-care facilities and emergency rooms.

On May 4, 2010, the L.A. County Coroner's office autopsy report revealed that Haim died of diffuse alveolar damage and pneumonia, together with hypertrophic cardiomyopathy and coronary arteriosclerosis. The death was ruled a natural death. As to the question of whether drugs were involved, the coroner stated: "the toxicology report revealed no significant contributing factor". Before the autopsy report was released publicly, Haim's mother stated that the coroner had given her a "courtesy call" to state his preliminary findings that Haim died of pulmonary edema and was suffering from an enlarged heart and water in the lungs. Haim's death certificate lists "Diffuse Alveolar Damage" and "Community Acquired Pneumonia" as causes of death, with "Hypertrophic Cardiomyopathy With Coronary Arteriosclerosis" listed as other conditions contributing but not related to the immediate cause of death.

On March 25, 2010, approximately twenty doctors were subpoenaed in connection with Haim's case. Haim had claimed to each that he was not seeing any other doctors, and many reported feeling "duped" by him. Attorney General Brown called Haim the "poster child" for prescription drug addiction.

=== Funeral and aftermath ===
A private Jewish funeral ceremony for Haim took place on March 16, 2010, at Steeles Memorial Chapel in Thornhill, Ontario. Both of Haim's parents attended, along with 200 friends and family. A dozen fans waited outside. Corey Feldman did not attend the funeral, initially stating that he wished to minimize publicity for the family. However, in October 2024, Feldman claimed that he did not attend the funeral of Haim--who he described as his "best friend"--because financial difficulties made him unable to purchase a plane ticket. Feldman said that he "hoped his friend would be remembered 'as a beautiful, funny, enigmatic character who brought nothing but life and lights and entertainment and art to all of our lives'".

Haim had very little money at the time of his death. His mother announced that the cost of his funeral would be covered by public funds provided by the city of Toronto as is customary in destitute cases. However, city officials stated that no paperwork had been submitted by the family, who entreated fans to help provide for the burial in an online appeal. A $20,000 contribution was made by a memorabilia site to which Haim had sold items over the years, but the company later put a stop payment on the check after it emerged that the funeral home had stepped in to cover the costs from the outset. Haim's personal effects were put up for auction on eBay by a cast member from A Time to Live, whose listings claimed that the family had asked him to sell the items as they needed money for burial expenses.

Haim's body was buried at Pardes Shalom Cemetery in the Maple neighborhood of Vaughan, in the York Region of Ontario, Canada.

Haim was omitted from the "In Memoriam" tribute montage at both the 17th Screen Actors Guild Awards and the 83rd Academy Awards in the year following his death. Perceived by the press as a "snub", Haim's omission from the Oscars received widespread media coverage. Corey Feldman said the snub showed that the Academy of Motion Picture Arts and Sciences does not "have a handle on who the public adores."

Haim was the subject of a TV program, Autopsy: The Last Hours of Corey Haim, which premiered on November 23, 2016, on the Reelz channel.

== Filmography ==
Film
Year	Title	Role	Notes
1984	Firstborn	Brian Livingston	
1985	Secret Admirer	Jeff Ryan	
1985	Silver Bullet	Marty Coslaw	
1985	Murphy's Romance	Jake Moriarty	
1986	Lucas	Lucas Bly	
1987	The Lost Boys	Sam Emerson	
1988	License to Drive	Les Anderson	
1988	Watchers	Travis Cornell	
1989	Dream a Little Dream	Dinger Holfield	
1990	Prayer of the Rollerboys	Griffin	
1991	Fast Getaway	Nelson Potter	
1991	Dream Machine	Barry Davis	
1992	Oh, What a Night	Eric Hansen	Direct-to-video
1992	The Double 0 Kid	Lance Elliot	Direct-to-video
1993	Blown Away	Rich Gardner	
1993	Anything for Love	Chris Calder	also known as Just One of the Girls
1994	National Lampoon's Last Resort	Dave	Direct-to-video
1994	Fast Getaway II	Nelson Potter	Direct-to-video
1995	Dream a Little Dream 2	Dinger Holfield	Direct-to-video
1995	Life 101	Ramsy	Direct-to-video
1996	Demolition High	Lenny Slater	Direct-to-video
1996	Never Too Late	Max	
1996	Shooter on the Side	Unknown	
1996	Snowboard Academy	Chris Barry	
1997	Busted	Clifford	Direct-to-video
1997	Fever Lake	Albert	Direct-to-video
1997	Demolition University	Lenny Slater	Direct-to-video
1997	Batman & Robin	Biker Gang Member	(uncredited)
2002	The Backlot Murders	Tony	Direct-to-video
2003	Dickie Roberts: Former Child Star	Himself	
2007	Universal Groove	Jim	
2008	Lost Boys: The Tribe	Sam Emerson	Direct-to-video
2009	Crank: High Voltage	Randy	
2009	Shark City	Chip Davis	
2009	Trade In	Himself	
2010	American Sunset	Tom MacLean	
2010	New Terminal Hotel	Jasper Crash	Posthumous release
2011	Decisions	Detective Lou Andreas	Posthumous release
2014	The Dead Sea	Oso	Posthumous release

Television
Year	Title	Role	Notes
1984–1985	The Edison Twins	Larry	26 episodes
1985	A Time to Live	Peter Weisman	Television film
1987	Roomies	Matthew Wiggins	Eight episodes
1998	Psi Factor: Chronicles of the Paranormal	Research Project Intern	Episode: "The Egress"
1998	Merlin: The Quest Begins	Wilf	Television film
2000	Big Wolf on Campus	Himself	Episode: "Blame it on the Haim"
2000	Without Malice	Marty	Television film
2007–2008	The Two Coreys	Himself	19 episodes
2007	Robot Chicken	Himself	Episode: Federated Resources

Video games
Year	Title	Role	Notes
1993	Double Switch	Eddie	Starring role in live-action video game

== See also ==
- List of Canadian child actors

== Bibliography ==
- Holmstrom, John. The Moving Picture Boy: An International Encyclopedia from 1895 to 1995, Norwich, Michael Russell, 1996, p. 390.
