= Busted (film) =

- Directed by: Corey Feldman
- Written by: Ronald Jacobs; Maria James
- Produced by: Bradford Hill
- Starring: Corey Feldman; Corey Haim; Elliott Gould
- Music by: John Gonzalez
- Distributed by: PM Entertainment Group Inc.
- Release date: February 14, 1997
- Running time: 85 minutes
- Language: English

Busted is a 1997 comedy film, starring Corey Feldman, Corey Haim and Elliott Gould. The film marked Corey Feldman's directorial debut. Due to his frequent absences and drug use during filming, Haim was eventually fired by Feldman. Feldman later said it was one of the hardest and most painful things he ever did.

== Plot ==
The police force of the somewhat-quiet town of Amity decide to get crime off the streets and decide that the prostitutes are better off working out of the police station. The ladies take over several police duties to ensure their cover.

== Cast ==
- Corey Feldman as David
- Corey Haim as Clifford
- Dominick Brascia as Evan Howe
- Elliott Gould as Game Show Host
- Mariana Morgan as Captain Mary Mae
- Julie Strain as Annette
- Michael Maguire as Captain Alexander Smith
- Ava Fabian as Lacey
- Devin DeVasquez as Casey
- Monique Parent as Carrie
- Rhonda Rydell as Elizabeth
