= Blown Away (1993 film) =

1993 film by Brenton Spencer

- VHS cover
- Directed by: Brenton Spencer
- Written by: Robert C. Cooper
- Produced by: Peter R. Simpson
- Starring: Corey Haim; Nicole Eggert; Corey Feldman; Jean LeClerc; Kathleen Robertson
- Cinematography: Perci Young
- Edited by: Bill Towgood
- Music by: Paul Zaza
- Production company: Norstar Entertainment Inc.
- Distributed by: Live Entertainment
- Release date: April 1, 1993
- Running time: 93 minutes
- Countries: Canada; United States
- Language: English

Blown Away is a 1993 erotic thriller film directed by Brenton Spencer and starring Corey Haim, Nicole Eggert, and Corey Feldman. The film premiered on HBO on August 14, 1993, and was released on VHS on November 23, 1993.

== Plot ==
After her mother dies in a mysterious car accident, 17-year-old Megan Bower, daughter of a wealthy businessman, lives a reckless lifestyle. A year later, she is almost killed by a horse who has lost control, though she is rescued by Rich Gardner, a young college dropout who works at the ski resort owned by her father Cy. Grateful, she invites him to her party, where she thanks him again by being intimate with him in her father's bed. The next morning, Cy comes home and almost catches them. Even though he does not, he angers Megan by forbidding her to see any guys. Unlike Cy, Rich's girlfriend Darla Hawkes does find out about the affair, and dumps him. Rich wastes no time and enters into a passionate relationship with Megan. She soon introduces him to her father, but he disapproves of him, and Megan tells Rich that they cannot see each other any longer.

Devastated, Rich turns to his womanizing older brother Wes for comfort, who encourages him to do everything to get Megan back. He follows her to a bar, where she is seen giving a large sum of money to a criminal-looking man. Rich catches her getting intimate with the guy, and knocks him down as a response. Megan then apologizes to Rich, and claims that she did not think that he really loved her and was only testing him in order to see how much he would be willing to do for her. He immediately takes her back, and they accompany each other to a bar, where Wes always hangs out with his friends. While Rich is arguing with Darla, who accuses him of going out with her only because of her money, Megan is seen talking with Wes. As they go to their home together, they run into Cy, who calls his daughter a slut for bringing a boy home, resulting in a huge fight between them.

Rich decides to go home, where he finds Wes sleeping with Darla. Enraged, he tries to beat up Wes, but Darla stops them by informing Rich that he does not own her; later, Rich apologizes to Wes, saying that he should not have taken his feelings of anger out on him, and Wes accepts (while remarking that it had been a while since they "had a few rounds" with each other), and then apologizes for what he did. Rich decides to return to Megan's place, where she — fed up with fighting with her father — convinces him that her father killed her mother and that they should kill him, and run off with the money. However, Rich, blinded by the potently sexual relationship, is in two minds about what to do.

The next day, Rich and Wes are shocked to find out that Darla has been killed in a horse riding accident. Meanwhile, Megan turns out hospitalized and claims to Rich that her father is to blame. Rich, seeing how severely beaten up she is, fears losing her someday to Cy's abuse, and promises her to help her. As they return home, Megan tells Rich that she has placed a bomb in his bike, and that 'it will all be over soon'. The next morning, Rich is invited by Cy to accompany him on a bike ride, causing Rich to witness the explosion that throws him almost off a cliff. As Cy falls to his death, he tells Rich that he did not kill his wife. Rich starts to suspect that Megan may not be who he thinks she is, and meanwhile, he becomes the prime suspect in Cy's death in the investigation of Detective Anderson. Despite Anderson's attempts to make him turn in Megan, Rich denies any involvement in the entire ordeal, though evidence points against him. Wes is shocked that his brother would have killed anyone, and is mad at him for not having killed their own abusive father.

Shortly later, Megan bails out Rich, and gives him her car. She tells Rich to meet her at the house and that she's made all the arrangements. However, now distrustful of Megan, he checks the car for a bomb, but finds nothing and drives off.

We then see Rich leaving the resort where he says goodbye to Wes. That night as Rich is driving, thinking about Cy's death, he veers off the road into a patch of grass. The car gets stuck in the mud so Rich exits the vehicle to see what's wrong. He discovers a bomb about to explode, but is able to get away just in time and immediately rushes to Megan's house.

There, it is revealed that Megan and Wes were lovers all along and planned the murders and schemes together in order to be together. Rich confronts his older brother, and Wes informs him that he tried to frame him because he has always hated him. As Wes is about to shoot Rich, Megan kills Wes. She tries to put the entire blame on Wes, but Rich does not believe her, prompting her to reveal that she was the mastermind behind it all. As she tries to shoot Rich, the police arrive, killing Megan immediately in self-defense; Rich was wired throughout the final scene, which clears him from all charges (although he has nobody important in his life anymore, leaving him empty inside).

== Cast ==
- Corey Haim as Rich Gardner
- Nicole Eggert as Megan Bower
- Corey Feldman as Wes Gardner
- Jean LeClerc as Cy Bower
- Kathleen Robertson as Darla Hawkes
- Gary Farmer as Detective Anderson
- Jason Hopley as Rody
- Alessandro Bandiera as Davis
- Rob Stefaniuk as Dave
- Rex Hagon as Marshall
- Lindsay Jamieson as Megan's Mother
