= Lucas (1986 film) =

1986 film by David Seltzer

- Theatrical release poster
- Directed by: David Seltzer
- Written by: David Seltzer
- Produced by: David Nicksay; Kristi Zea
- Starring: Corey Haim; Charlie Sheen; Kerri Green; Courtney Thorne-Smith
- Cinematography: Reynaldo Villalobos
- Edited by: Priscilla Nedd
- Music by: Dave Grusin
- Production company: Lawrence Gordon Productions
- Distributed by: 20th Century Fox
- Release date: March 28, 1986
- Running time: 100 minutes
- Country: United States
- Language: English
- Budget: $6 million
- Box office: $8.2 million

Lucas is a 1986 American coming-of-age romantic sports comedy-drama film written and directed by David Seltzer in his directorial debut, and starring Corey Haim, Kerri Green, Charlie Sheen and Courtney Thorne-Smith. Thorne-Smith and Winona Ryder made their film debuts in Lucas.

== Plot ==
Lucas Blye is a 14-year-old high school student in suburban Chicago. While on one of his entomological quests, he meets Maggie, a slightly older girl who just moved into Lucas' town. Becoming friends, Maggie spends time with him during the summer until high school begins for them both.

Lucas, a frequent victim of bullying, has a protector of sorts in Cappie Roew, an older student and a football player. Cappie was one of Lucas' tormentors until he contracted hepatitis and Lucas brought him his homework every day, ensuring that Cappie did not have to repeat a year of school.

Maggie becomes a cheerleader for the football team in order to get closer to Cappie, on whom she has a crush. Angered by her inattention towards him, Lucas chastises her, dismissing her cheerleading as "superficial" and incorrectly believing she will be his date to an upcoming school dance.

On the night of the dance, Cappie is dumped by his girlfriend Alise due to his attraction to Maggie. Cappie finds comfort with Maggie at her house to the chagrin of Lucas, who arrives to pick her up for the dance. Even though Cappie and Maggie invite him out for pizza, he rebukes them and rides off on his bike.

Rina, one of Lucas' friends, encounters him sitting alone, watching the dance from across the lake. Although she has feelings for Lucas, she puts them aside to console him about he and Maggie being "from two different worlds". On the way home, Lucas rides by the pizzeria and is crushed to see Maggie and Cappie kissing.

In an attempt to impress Maggie and gain her respect, Lucas joins the football team. In the shower after practice, he endures a prank from his tormentors Bruno and Spike. At the end of the day, Lucas flees in embarrassment and Maggie chases him to talk. When she tells him that she wants him to be her friend, Lucas tries to kiss her. Maggie recoils and a heartbroken Lucas screams at her to leave.

The next day at the football game, Lucas sneaks onto the field despite being removed from the team for lack of parental consent. He is seriously injured after being tackled without his helmet and is rushed to the hospital. Maggie, Cappie, and Rina attempt to contact Lucas' parents. Correcting Maggie's misguided impression that Lucas lives in the luxurious house where she has seen him several times, Rina shows them that Lucas' home is a dilapidated trailer in a junkyard where Lucas lives with his alcoholic father, who is a gardener at the large house.

Meanwhile, Lucas' schoolmates hold vigil in the hospital as he recuperates. Maggie visits him and sternly tells him never to play football again. Lucas promises and they reconcile, picking up their friendship. They speculate as to where they will be when the locusts return in 17 years; both hope that they will still be in touch. Lucas returns to school after his recovery and opens his locker to find a varsity letter jacket with his name and number on the back. Bruno starts to clap slowly and everyone else in the hallway applauds in sync as Lucas raises his arms triumphantly and smiles.

== Cast ==
- Corey Haim as Lucas Blye
- Kerri Green as Maggie
- Charlie Sheen as Cappie Roew
- Courtney Thorne-Smith as Alise
- Ciro Poppiti as Ben
- Winona Ryder as Rina
- Tom Hodges as Bruno
- Guy Boyd as Coach
- Jeremy Piven as Spike
- Garrett M. Brown as Mr. Kaiser
- Gary Cole as Assistant Coach

== Reception ==
=== Critical ===
Reviews for Lucas were generally positive. Based on 22 reviews collected by the film review aggregator Rotten Tomatoes, 76% of critics gave Lucas a positive review and the film has an average score of 6.5/10. On Metacritic, it has a weighted average score of 75 out of 100 based on 11 critics, indicating "generally favorable" reviews.

In the Chicago Sun-Times, Roger Ebert gave the film 4 out of 4 stars, saying Haim gave "one of the most three-dimensional, complicated, interesting characters of any age in any recent movie". He also praised Green who "understands this character in her heart", and Sheen for not playing a stereotypical jock and instead showing deep affection for Lucas and not wanting to hurt his feelings by dating Maggie. Ebert said Lucas was a film "about teenagers who are learning how to be good to each other, to care, and not simply to be filled with egotism, lust and selfishness, which is all most Hollywood movies think teenagers can experience". Ebert later included the film in his top 10 films of 1986.

=== Box office ===
The film was not considered a box office success, grossing $8,200,000 in the United States.

=== Awards ===
Both Corey Haim and Kerri Green were nominated for a Young Artist Award for Best Leading Young Actor in a Feature Film and Young Artist Award for Best Leading Young Actress in a Feature Film respectively at the 8th Youth in Film Awards in 1987.

=== Legacy ===
The film is ranked at number 16 on Entertainment Weekly's list of the 50 Best High School Movies.

== See also ==
- List of American football films
