= Kalfu =

Haitian Vodou deity

- Crossroads, misfortune, destruction, sorcery
- Venerated in: Haitian Vodou, Folk Catholicism, Voodoo Makaya, Voodoo American, Voodoo louisiania
- Attributes: Rum, gunpowder, red, black, bulls, snakes, 7 tree leaves

Kalfu (Note: alternative spellings include Kalfou, Carrefour, Maître Carrefour, or Mait' Carrefour) (literally crossroads) is a lwa in Haitian Vodou. He is often envisioned as a young man or as a enigmatic spirit; his color is black or red, and he favors rum infused with gunpowder. He is often syncretized with the Shadow.

As his name indicates, he also controls the crossroads and has the power to grant or deny access to all other lwa, or spirits, and he allows the "crossing" with an understanding into the nature of chaos and creation, good and misfortune, and injustices.
