= Heymann =

Heymann is a German surname. Notable people with the surname include:

- Andreas Heymann (born 1966), French biathlete
- Aribert Heymann (1898–1946), German field hockey player
- Barak Heymann, Israeli film director and producer
- Carl Heymann (1854–1922), German composer, pianist, and piano teacher
- Carsten Heymann (born 1972), German biathlete
- Claude Heymann (1907–1994), French filmmaker
- Daniel Heymann (1949–2020), Argentine economist
- Danièle Heymann (1933–2019), French journalist and film critic
- Delphyne Heymann (born 1966), French biathlete
- Eric Kwame Heymann (1928–1987), Ghanaian journalist and politician
- Erika Heymann (1895–1950), German woman posthumously conferred Righteous Among the Nations
- Ernst Heymann (1870–1946), German jurist
- Ezra Heymann (1928–2014), German philosopher and professor
- Franz Heymann (1924–2005), British physicist
- Isaac Heymann (1829–1906), Dutch cantor and composer
- Jimmy Ben Heymann, Ghanaian diplomat
- Juan Andrade Heymann (born 1945), Ecuadorian writer, novelist, short story writer, poet, and playwright
- Klaus Heymann (born 1936), German entrepreneur
- Lida Heymann (1868–1943), German feminist, pacifist, and women's rights activist
- Lindy Heymann, British director
- Margarete Heymann (1899–1990), German ceramic artist
- Philip Heymann (1932–2021), American academic and attorney, father of Stephen
- Robert Heymann (1879–1946), German filmmaker
- Sebastian Heymann (born 1998), German handball player
- Stefan Heymann (1896–1967), German diplomat and politician
- Stephen Heymann, American attorney, son of Philip
- Tomer Heymann (born 1970), Israeli filmmaker
- Vania Heymann (born 1986), Israeli artist and film director
- Werner R. Heymann (1896–1961), German composer
- William Heymann (1885–1969), English cricketer

== See also ==
- - Heymann Steinthal (1823–1899), German philologist and philosopher
  - Carl Heymanns Verlag, German publisher
- Hayman
- Heyman
- Heiman
- Hyman
- Hijmans
