= Hyman =

Hyman is a surname. Notable people with the surname include:

- Alan Hyman (1910–1999), English author and screenwriter
- Albert Hyman (1893–1972), co-inventor of the artificial pacemaker
- Anthony Hyman (disambiguation), several people
- Ben Zion Hyman (1891–1984), Canadian-Jewish bookseller
- Bill Hyman (1875–1959), English cricketer
- C. S. Hyman (1854–1926), Canadian businessman, politician, and sportsman
- Dick Hyman (born 1927), American jazz pianist/keyboardist and composer
- Dorothy Hyman (born 1941), British athlete
- Eric Hyman (born 1950), collegiate athletic director
- Flo Hyman (1954–1986), American volleyball player and Olympic silver medalist
- Greg Hyman (1947–2026), American toy inventor
- Herbert Hyman (1918–1985), American sociologist
- Ishmael Hyman (born 1995), American football player
- James Hyman (born 1970), British DJ and music supervisor
- James Macklin Hyman (born 1950), American applied mathematician
- Jeffrey Hyman (1951–2001), birth name of punk rock singer-songwriter Joey Ramone
- Jennifer Hyman, CEO and co-founder of Rent the Runway
- Joe Hyman (1921–1999), British textile industrialist
- John Adams Hyman (1840–1891), born a slave, later became Congressman for North Carolina
- John Hyman (philosopher) (born 1960), British philosopher
- Kelly Hyman (born 1969) is an Australian-American attorney and president of the Federal Bar Association in Palm Beach County, Florida
- Kemar Hyman (born 1989), Caymanian sprinter
- Kenneth Hyman (1928–2026), American film executive and producer
- Libbie Hyman (1888–1969), American zoologist
- Lillian Florsheim (1896–1988), American sculptor
- Louis Hyman (born 1977), American writer and economic historian
- Marc Hyman, Hollywood film writer
- Mark Hyman (born 1959), American physician and author
- Mark E. Hyman (born 1958), Vice President for Corporate Relations for Sinclair Broadcast Group
- Martin Hyman (1933–2021), British long-distance runner
- Misty Hyman (born 1979), American swimmer and Olympic gold medalist
- Monique Holsey-Hyman (born 1965), American politician, social worker, and academic
- Noah Hyman, American politician
- Phyllis Hyman (1949–1995), American soul singer, model and actress
- Ray Hyman (born 1928), Professor Emeritus of Psychology at the University of Oregon, magician, and critic of parapsychology
- Rob Hyman (born 1950), American singer, songwriter, and producer
- Trina Schart Hyman (1939–2004), American illustrator of children's books
- William B. Hyman (1814–1884), Louisiana Supreme Court justice
- Zach Hyman (born 1992), Canadian ice hockey player and author

== Given name ==
Hyman, or a variant Hymen is the given name of:

- Hyman Bass (born 1932), American mathematician
- Hyman "Hy" Buller (1926–1968), Canadian All Star NHL ice hockey player
- Hyman Bress (1931–1995), violinist and composer
- Hyman "Hy" Cohen (1931–2021), baseball player
- Frederic Hymen Cowen (1852–1935), British conductor, composer, and pianist
- Hyman George Rickover (1900–1986), US Navy Admiral
- Hyman Holtz (c. 1896 – c. 1939), New York racketeer
- Hyman Kaplan, fictional character
- Hyman Kreitman (1914–2001), British businessman
- Hyman Krustofski, a fictional character on The Simpsons
- Hyman Martin (1903–1987), Chicago mobster
- Hyman Minsky (1919–1996), US economist who studied financial crises
- Hyman Roth, a fictional character in The Godfather series of books and films
- Hymen B. Mintz (1909–1986), US politician

== See also ==
- Hyman Archive
- Chayyim, the basis for this name
- Hymie (disambiguation)
- Heyman
- Hymen
- Haiman
- Hijmans
- Heiman
- Heymann
- Hymans

John James Hyman chaplain to Robert E. Lee. Nickname JJ Hyman. He persuaded Robert E. Lee to surrender to the north. John James Hyman was with him at the time he surrendered to the north.
