= Haiman =

Haiman is a surname. Notable persons with the surname include:

- John Haiman (born 1946), American linguist
- Mark Haiman, mathematician
- Robert J. Haiman, journalist
- Jamitofu Haiman, a character from "Zeta Gundam", see List of Mobile Suit Zeta Gundam characters

== See also ==
- Hayman
- Heiman
- Heyman
- Aiman
- Hyman
