= Heiman =

Heiman is a surname. Notable people with the surname include:

- Adolphus Heiman (1809–1862), Prussian-born American architect
- Daniel Heiman, musician
- Jesse Heiman (born 1978), American actor
- Julia Heiman, American sexologist and psychologist
- Levi Heimans (born 1985), Dutch track cyclist
- Louise Henry (actress) (born Jessie Louise Heiman, 1911–1967), American film actress
- Michal Heiman (born 1954), Israeli artist
- Nachum Heiman, composer of songs and musics of films
- Shlomo Heiman (1892–1945), Rabbi
- Susan Heiman, a Miss Missouri
- Walter Heiman (1901–2007), one of the last surviving veteran of the First World War

== See also ==
- Chayyim, the basis for this name and similar spellings
- Heiman Dullaart (1636–1684), Dutch painter and poet
- Heimans
- Heyman
- Heymann
- Heymans
- Hijmans
- Haiman
- Hyman
