= Edda Tasiemka =

German archivist (1922–2019)

- At home with her files in 2014
- Born: Edda Hoppe; 5 August 1922; Hamburg
- Died: 30 March 2019 (aged 96)
- Occupations: Archivist and journalist
- Known for: Hans Tasiemka Archive

Edda Tasiemka (née Hoppe; 1922–2019) was a German archivist who, with her husband Hans, established a large library of about six million press cuttings which was used by authors and journalists in London—the Hans Tasiemka Archive. It was successful because it contained material from magazines and periodicals going back to the 19th century and these were otherwise hard to obtain. She continued to maintain and operate the archive for 39 years after her husband died, passing it into the care of the Hyman Archive when she was 95.

== Early life and marriage ==
Her parents were Luise Hoppe and the communist politician, Paul Frölich. She was born in 1922 in Hamburg. Her father was imprisoned in 1933 and her mother in 1938. She was herself interviewed by the Gestapo and refused to join the Hitler Youth. Having trained as a draughtswoman designing air raid shelters, she worked for the British army of occupation after the Second World War and met Hans Tasiemka in 1949, while he was working as an interpreter for the war crimes trials. They moved to London where they married with the actor Peter Lorre as the best man.

== Hans Tasiemka Archive ==
In London, Hans worked as a journalist for the Foreign Office, while Edda worked for Universal Aunts. She started working as a journalist too, writing stories for German magazines and newspapers. They developed Hans' professional habit of collecting clippings into a library and commercial business, supplying authors and journalists.

Moving from a bedsit off the Finchley Road to a semi-detached house in Golders Green, they accumulated about six million cuttings from magazines and newspapers dating back to the 19th century. The older magazines, such as a complete run of Le Rire, were acquired at antiques fairs. The cuttings were filed by person – celebrities such as royalty and sportsmen – and by topics such as bigamy and sneezing. It had a better coverage of magazines and international periodicals than newspapers' own cuttings libraries and those libraries were disrupted or destroyed when the newspapers moved out of Fleet Street in the 1980s. Her husband Hans died in 1979 but Edda continued to operate the library up to the age of 95.

She developed her own index system which enabled her to locate relevant cuttings quickly. Historian Robert Lacey, who used the library to write Majesty, said, "Mrs Tasiemka was a Google search engine long before Google was invented." This facility caused her to be nicknamed the "Human Google". Another keen customer was the author, Nicholas Coleridge, who used her as a character in a novel. Other authors who credited her included Tina Brown, Rupert Butler, Kitty Kelley, John Pearson and Howard Sounes.

She never advertised the business, attracting custom just by word of mouth. One reason for this was that she was frightened that the archive would be closed down as a fire risk. To avoid attracting the attention of the authorities, she always called herself a "researcher" on official documents, never a librarian. The advent of the Internet reduced the turnover of the business but, in 2005, the library might still get 20 inquiries in a day, seeking information about subjects such as the Tanganyika groundnut scheme, Milli Vanilli or John Humphrys. Her charges for information then started at £50. She still enjoyed reading the stories herself, saying, "Sometimes I take cuttings to bed with me ... During the day I've got to control myself and not start reading unless it's for a customer."

There had been offers to buy the library from Eddy Shah and Robert Maxwell but they were refused. Edda had assistants to help operate the library but did all the filing herself so, when she became too frail in 2018, the library was transferred to the Hyman Archive, which plans to digitise it. She was pleased that the material had gone to a good home and welcomed the re-appearance of the paintings that had been covered by piles of files.

== Personal life ==
After her husband died, Peter Knight, who ran a cartoon syndication agency, became her "toyboy". They would go out together dancing or to the opera or theatre. They dined by romantic candlelight twice a week but never lived together and he died in 2015.

Besides press cuttings, she also collected curios including Adam Buck tea sets, cat paintings by Louis Wain, Georgian salt cellars and knife rests, Meissen porcelain, Staffordshire figures and Victorian china fairings.

She was active into old age, going on marches to protest against the Iraq War and celebrating her 90th birthday with champagne. She was afraid of dogs, due to childhood experience of the German Shepherds used by the Gestapo, but fed urban foxes when she was in London. She also liked sheep and had two life-size model sheep in her drawing room.
