= Juan Andrade (disambiguation) =

Juan Andrade (1898–1981) was a Spanish politician.

Juan Andrade may also refer to:

- Juan C. Andrade, CEO of USAA
- Juan Pablo Andrade (born 1988), Chilean footballer
- Juan Andrade (karateka), participated in Karate at the 2010 Central American and Caribbean Games
- Juan Andrade (triathlete) in Triathlon at the 2015 Pan American Games – Men's

== See also ==
- Juan Andrade Heymann (born 1945), Ecuadorian writer
