= Heyman =

Heyman is a surname. Notable people with the surname include:

- Alan Heyman (1931–2014), South Korean musicologist and composer
- Art Heyman (1941–2012), American basketball player
- David Heyman, British film producer
- Edward Heyman (1907–1981), American musician and lyricist
- George Heyman, Canadian politician
- Harry Heyman (1875–1932), American politician
- Joel Heyman, American voice actor
- John Heyman, British film producer
- Jon Heyman, American baseball writer
- Josiah Heyman, American anthropologist
- Kathryn Heyman, Australian writer
- Michelle Heyman, Australian soccer player
- Norma Heyman, British film producer
- Paul Heyman (born 1965), American wrestling manager
- Preston Heyman, British record producer, drummer and percussionist
- Richard A. Heyman (c. 1935–1994), American politician
- Richard X. Heyman, American singer-songwriter and musician
- Samuel J. Heyman, (1939–2009), American businessman and hedge fund manager
- Sophie Heyman (1915–2011), Belgian-born Spanish soprano commonly known as Sofía Noel

== See also ==
- Heymann
- Heymans
- Heiman
- Hyman
- Hijmans
