= Haysman =

Haysman is a surname. Notable people with the surname include:

- Kane Haysman (born 1995), English footballer
- Mike Haysman (born 1961), Australian-born South African cricket player and commentator

== See also ==
- Hayman
