= Desert lizard =

Desert lizard may refer to:

- Any number of lizards that may be found in desert climates
- Desert horned lizard
- Desert night lizard
- Kadrun (Kadal Gurun, lit. 'Desert Lizard'), an Indonesian political term
