= List of religious slurs =

The following is a list of religious slurs or religious insults in the English language that are, or have been, used as insinuations or allegations about adherents or non-believers of a given religion or irreligion, or to refer to them in a derogatory (critical or disrespectful), pejorative (disapproving or contemptuous), or insulting manner.

== Christians ==
=== Non-denominational ===
Term	Location of origin	Targeted demographic	Meaning, origin and notes	References
Bible beater, Bible basher	North America	Evangelicals of Baptist, Methodist and Pentecostal denominations	A dysphemism for evangelical Christians who believe in the inerrancy of the Bible, particularly those from Baptist, Methodist and Pentecostal denominations. It is also a slang term for an evangelising Christian. Commonly used universally against Christians who are perceived to go out of their way to energetically preach their faith to others.	
Bible thumper	United States	Christian people, specifically fundamentalists	Someone perceived as aggressively imposing their Christian beliefs upon others. The term derives from preachers thumping their hands down on the Bible, or thumping the Bible itself, to emphasize a point during a sermon. The term's target domain is broad and can often extend to anyone engaged in a public show of religion, fundamentalist or not. The term is frequently used in English-speaking countries.	
Cafeteria Christian	United States	Christians perceived to "pick and choose" which Christian doctrines they believe and those they do not	Used by some Christians, and others, to accuse other Christian individuals or denominations of selecting which Christian doctrines they will follow, and which they will not.	
Chuhra	Punjab	Christians	Derived from the Chuhra caste, a Dalit community whose traditional occupation was sweeping and cleaning. Most Christians in Punjab, along with many in Uttar Pradesh, are from the Chuhra and Chamar communities. The term has been used in an abusive manner to refer to Dalits in the Indian subcontinent and in Pakistan specifically, it has been applied to Christians of Dalit ancestry. In India, the terms "Chuhra" and "Chamar" are used abusively as well towards those of Dalit ancestry, though without reference to any specific religious community.	
Fundie	United States	Christian fundamentalists	Shortening of fundamentalist. Usually used to mean a Christian fundamentalist.	
God botherer	Australia	Christian people	Similar to Bible basher, a person who is very vocal about their religion and prayer.	
Isai	Pakistan	Christian people	From Isa Masih, a name of Jesus Christ in the Hindi-language Bible. The term literally means '[person/people] of Jesus' in India and Pakistan, but in the latter country, Isai has been pejoratively used by non-Christians to refer to 'street sweepers' or 'labourers', occupations that have been held by Christian workers of Dalit ancestry. In neighboring India, the term Isai simply refers to Christians and has no negative connotations; in northern India, Christians use the term Isai to refer to themselves.	
Rice Christian, Rice bag	United Kingdom, India	Materially benefiting Christians In India: Christians (especially lower caste converts)	Someone who has formally declared themself a Christian for material benefits rather than for religious reasons. In India, the term has been extended to refer to any Christian convert.	

=== Protestants ===
Term	Location of origin	Targeted demographic	Meaning, origin and notes	References
Campbellite	United States	Followers of Church of Christ	Followers of the Church of Christ, from American Restoration Movement leaders Thomas Campbell and Alexander Campbell, the latter being one of two key people considered the founders of the movement.	
Holy Roller	United States	Methodists of the Holiness Movement, Holiness Pentecostals	Named after church services involving spontaneous acts of worship, such as sobbing, wailing, groaning, and kneeling.	
Hun	United Kingdom, Ireland	Christian Protestants, especially Glasgow Rangers supporters	Used by Irish republicans against Protestant unionists, especially by Glasgow Celtic supporters against those of Glasgow Rangers	
Jaffa	United Kingdom	Christian Protestants	Named after a common orange-flavoured cake/biscuit in Ireland and UK.	
Kocia wiara	Poland	Non-Roman Catholic Christians	Literally “feline faith” or “cat faith”. Most often used against Jehovah's Witnesses but also against Baptists, Mariavites and members of Polish National Catholic Church.	
Prod, Proddy	United Kingdom, Ireland	Christian Protestants	Particularly used by bullies to disparage a child who attends a Protestant school. Proddywhoddy and proddywoddy are used in children's school rhymes in Cork.	
Orangie	Ireland	Ulster Protestants	Referring to the Orange Order	
Russellite	United States	Jehovah's Witnesses	Jehovah's Witnesses, from American religious leader Charles Taze Russell.	
Shaker	United States	Christian people	Member of the United Society of Believers in Christ's Second Appearing. Originated as "Shaking Quakers", in reference to their similarity to Quakers as well as their charismatic worship practices, which involved dancing, shouting, and speaking in tongues. The term was originally derogatory, but very early on was embraced and used by the Shakers themselves.	
Shouting Methodists	United States, United Kingdom	Methodists	Member of a Methodist denomination, in reference to their free expression and enthusiasm during worship, particularly during revival services and camp meetings.	
Soup-taker	Ireland	Christian who has sold out their beliefs	Person who has sold out their beliefs, referring to the Great Famine of Ireland when some Catholics converted to a Protestant faith in order to gain access to a free meal.	
Wee-Free	Scotland	Free Church of Scotland	Following the disruption of 1843, Free Kirkers were sometimes taunted with the epithet of "Wee Frees" because they were smaller ("wee") than the original Church of Scotland.	

=== Catholics ===
Term	Location of origin	Targeted demographic	Meaning, origin and notes	References
Czarna mafia	Poland	Catholic priests	Literally “Black mafia”. The term suggests that Catholic Church has too much influence and works like a criminal organization.	
Left-footer	United Kingdom	Catholics	An informal phrase for a Roman Catholic, particularly in the armed forces. Derived from a belief that Irish laborers kick their shovels into the ground with their left foot.	
Fenian	United Kingdom	Irish Catholics	A term originally referencing the Fenian Brotherhood and the Irish Republican Brotherhood, organizations which supported a united Ireland. Today the term is used as a sectarian slur by Protestants, especially in Northern Ireland, Scotland and Australia.	
Katol	Poland	Catholics	Commonly known insult; shortened form of "Katolik".	
Katotalib, Katotaliban	Poland	Catholics	"Catho-talibans", ultracatholics.	
Mackerel snapper	North America	Catholics	The term originated in the U.S. in the 1850s and refers to the custom of Friday abstinence. The Friday abstinence from meat (red meat and poultry) distinguishes Catholics from other Christians, especially in North America.	
Mick	United Kingdom	Irish Catholics	Usually an Irish Catholic (a reference to the common "Mc" patronymic of Irish surnames, or a hypocorism of "Michael").	
Red letter tribe	North America	Catholics	A name given to Catholics for their keeping so many holy days; marked in their almanacs with red-coloured letters.	
Bead-rattler	Anglophone countries; predominantly the United States, U.K., Canada, and Australia	Catholics	Roman Catholic person, in reference to the Catholic ritual of praying with rosary beads.	
Redneck	Ireland	Catholics	Roman Catholic person, now considered archaic due to its association with the better-known American term.	
Shaveling	Unknown	Catholics	Usually disparaging: a tonsured clergyman, priest.	
Taig	Northern Ireland	Irish Catholics	From tadhg, perhaps Irish for "Timothy".	

=== Oriental Orthodox ===
Term	Location of origin	Targeted demographic	Meaning, origin and notes	References
Jacobite		Syriac Orthodox	The term is named after Jacob Baradeus who liberated the Oriental Orthodox from persecution in the mid-6th century. This title is rejected by the Syriac Orthodox as it assumes that the Church had been started by Jacob.	

=== Assyrian Church of the East ===
Term	Location of origin	Targeted demographic	Meaning, origin and notes	References
Nestorian		Assyrian Church of the East and the Ancient Church of the East	The term associated with the Assyrian Church of the East, or used to refer to its members, originates from a historical misinterpretation of the Antiochene Dyophysite Christology of Theodore of Mopsuestia. According to Sebastian Brock, a fellow of the British Academy: "The association between the Church of the East and Nestorius is of a very tenuous nature, and to continue to call that Church 'Nestorian' is, from a historical point of view, totally misleading and incorrect – quite apart from being highly offensive [...]". David Wilmshurst states that for centuries "the word 'Nestorian' was used both as a term of abuse by those who disapproved of the traditional East Syrian theology, as a term of pride by many of its defenders [...] and as a neutral and convenient descriptive term by others. Nowadays it is generally felt that the term carries a stigma". In 1994, the Common Christological Declaration between the Catholic Church and the Assyrian Church of the East marked the resolution of a dispute between those two Churches that had existed since the Council of Ephesus. They expressed their common understanding of doctrine concerning the divinity and humanity of Christ, and recognized the legitimacy and rightness of their respective descriptions of Mary as, on the Assyrian side, "the Mother of Christ our God and Saviour", and, on the Catholic side, as "the Mother of God" and also as "the Mother of Christ".	

=== Latter Day Saint movement ===
Term	Location of origin	Targeted demographic	Meaning, origin and notes	References
Molly Mormon	United States	Latter Day Saint	Term for the stereotype of a "perfect" female member of LDS Church.	
Peter Priesthood	United States	Latter Day Saint	Term for the stereotype of a "perfect" male member of LDS Church.	
Jack Mormon	United States	Latter Day Saint	A non-faithful LDS person or a non-Mormon altogether. Jack Mormon is usually used by non-Mormons to describe Mormons that do not follow the Word of Wisdom (dietary and health practices that exclude the use of tobacco or alcohol) and by Mormons to describe members that do not sufficiently follow practices. It is also used by Mormons to describe those who were Mormon but remain friendly to the church. It may be applied to ex-Mormons who have repudiated the church and its teachings but that is a rare usage.	

== Jews ==
Term	Location of origin	Targeted demographic	Meaning, origin and notes	References
Abbie, Abie	North America	Jewish male	A Jewish male. From the proper name Abraham. Originated before the 1950s.	
Christ-killer		Jews	In reference to Jewish deicide.	
Feuj (verlan for juif)	France	Jews	A corruption of the French word for Jewish, juif. Originating from the French argot Verlan.	
Heeb, Hebe	United States	Jews	Derived from the word Hebrew.	
Hymie	United States	Jews	Derived from the common Jewish first name. Also used in the term Hymietown, a nickname for Brooklyn, New York.	
Ikey, Ike	United States	Jews	Derived from Isaac, an important figure in Judaism and common Hebrew given name.	
Itzig	Nazi Germany	Jews	From Yiddish איציק (itsik), a variant or pet form of the name Isaak (alternatively Isaac).	
Jewboy	United States	Young Jewish boys	For a young Jewish male, originally young Jewish boys who sold counterfeit coins in 18th century London.	
Jidan	Romania	Jews	From jid, Romanian equivalent of yid.	
Kike	United States	Jews	Possibly from the Yiddish word for 'circle', kikel. It was suggested by Leo Rosten that the term originates from Jews who, when entering the United States at Ellis Island, signed their names with a circle instead of a cross because they associated the cross with Christianity.	
Mocky	United States	Jews	First used in the 1930s, possibly from the Yiddish word makeh meaning 'plague'.	
Red Sea pedestrian	Australia	Jews	A Jew, from the story of Moses leading the Jewish people out of Egypt in the Book of Exodus. Famously used in the 1979 British comedy film Monty Python's Life of Brian.	
Rootless cosmopolitan (Russian: безродный космополит)	Soviet Union	Jews	Soviet epithet as an accusation of lack of full allegiance to the Soviet Union.	
Sheeny	Europe	Jews	From Yiddish sheyn or German schön meaning 'beautiful'.	
Shylock	England	Jews	Jewish people as shrewd and money-loving; derived from the character in Shakespeare's play "Merchant of Venice".	
Yid	Europe	Jews	Yiddish word for 'Jew'.	
Zhyd Zhydovka	Russia Ukraine	Jews	From Russian and other Slavic languages, originally neutral, but became pejorative during debate over the Jewish question in the 1800s. Its use was banned by the Soviet authorities in the 1930s.	

== Muslims ==
Term	Location of origin	Targeted demographic	Meaning, origin and notes	References
Abdul, Abdool, Abdullah	United Kingdom, North America, India	Muslims (and also Pakistanis)	Derives from the common Muslim name-element Abdul, meaning "slave of" or "servant of".	
Bicot	France	Muslims (and generally Arabs)	Clipping of 'arbicot' (a diminutive of arbi - meaning Arab). French word usually used for Arabs/Maghrebis and Muslims.	
Bougnoule	France	Muslims	French word usually used for Arabs/Maghrebis, Africans/black people and Muslims. Derives from Wolof for 'wu ñuul' (meaning 'who is black').	
Cancer	India	Muslims	Muslims are referred to as cancer, a disease, in India in an offensive way, and to target Muslim population growth in India.	
Chuslim	India	Muslims	The portmanteau of the words 'Chus' and 'Muslim,' derived from 'chus' or 'chusna' (meaning 'to suck' in Hindi/Urdu), often used in internet forums and social media to mock or insult Muslims.	
Jihadi	North America, United Kingdom, India	Muslims, especially fundamentalist Jihadists	Derives from jihad.	
Kadrun	Indonesia	Islamic fundamentalism and reactionaries. Sometimes Jokowi opposition although different religion	Portmanteau of kadal gurun meaning 'desert lizard'. Originated as a social media political insult, the term is used for closed-minded Muslims influenced by Islamic extremism and fundamentalism from the Middle East.	
Kala, Kaliya	India, Myanmar	Rohingyas, Muslims	Term meaning 'black' in various Indo-Aryan languages, referring to the dark skin colour of South Asian Muslims. The term originally was used by Hindus of India and targeted at all Muslims of South Asia, but more recently is used as a slur directly against Rohingyas due to their perceived Bangladeshi origin.	
Katwa, Katwe, Katuve, Katua, K2a, K2o, k2wa, kto	India	Muslim men	Derives from the Hindi/Urdu for 'cut' referring to circumcision, a common practice for baby boys. Used to mock Muslims, often in the context of religious tensions. It is often associated with the Islamophobic and communal rhetoric that has been a part of online discourse in India in recent years, especially in religious polarization.	
Khatmal	Pakistan	Sh īʿi Muslims	Derives from the Urdu word for 'bedbug,' this term is used to dehumanize Shīʿites by portraying them as bloodsucking parasites.	
Miya	Assam, India	Bangladeshi Muslims	Derives from the honorific Mian	
Mujeet	Europe, North America, India	Muslims	Derives from "Pajeet", a derogatory slur for South Asians. Initially used to refer to Muslims from South Asia, now has expanded to include Muslims worldwide.	
Mulla, Mullah, Kathmulla, Sulla, Bulla	India, Iran	Muslims	Derives from mullah, a common title for Islamic religious scholars. Kathmulla is a derogatory slang term was first used by BJP spokesperson Sambit Patra during a television debate in 2018. The term was later frequently used by Yogi Adityanath, the current Chief Minister of Uttar Pradesh, in interviews and public speeches in 2022.	
Muklo	Philippines	Filipino Muslims (especially among Bangsamoro ethnic groups)	First used by soldiers of the Armed Forces of the Philippines stationed in Mindanao as an ethnic slur towards the Muslim Moro insurgents.	
Muzzie	Australia	Muslims	A shortened version of the word Muslim.	
Namazi, Andhnamazi	India	Muslims	Derives from namaz, the Persian word for obligatory daily prayers usually used instead of salah in the Indian subcontinent.	
Peaceful, peacefools, pissful, shantidoot	India	Muslims	Derives from the common statement that Islam is a "religion of peace". Sometimes the Hindi word "shantidoot" (Messenger of Peace) is used.	
Osama	North America	Muslim men	From Osama bin Laden.	
Paki	United Kingdom, Canada	Pakistanis and Muslims in general	Short for Pakistanis, word is now used as in extension as a slur to refer to all Muslims in the UK and Canada.	
Qadiani	Pakistan	Ahmadiyya	The term originates from Qadian, a small town in present-day Indian Punjab, the birthplace of Mirza Ghulam Ahmad, the founder of the Ahmadiyya movement. The use of Qadiani is primarily in Pakistan. The term has even been used in official Pakistani documents. It is also known as the Q-word.	
Rafida, Rawafid	Arab peninsula	Sh īʿi Muslims(regardless of race)	Term originally denoting extremist Shīʿites who reject (rafḍ) the caliphates of Abu Bakr and ʿUmar; often employed by critics as a slur against those Shīʿi Muslims who do not criticize the first three Caliphs, but only believe in "Alī’s right to the caliphate over Muʿāwiyah".	
Raghead	North America	Islamic turban wearers	From Islamic wearing of turbans.	
Rapefugee	United Kingdom, Europe, North America	Muslims	Rapefugee is derived from rape + refugee. The Arab Spring led to large scale migrations of Muslims into Europe, who arrived as refugees in the 2010s. Germany saw mass rape on the New Year's Eve 2015 in multiple cities by largely North African asylum seekers. This resulted in "rapefugee" being a slur directed at Muslims in North America, United Kingdom and the rest of Europe.	
Safavid	Iraq	Feyli Kurds	Mainly used by higher class Sunni Arabs during Ba'athist Iraq to insult Feyli Kurds for their belief in Shia Islam	
Shitskin	North America, United Kingdom, India	Muslims	Anti-Muslim and racist slur directed at Muslims in North America, United Kingdom and India for their extremely dark, "shit-coloured" skin-complexions.	
Terrorist	United States	Muslims	Used by radical anti-Islamists, due to anti-Muslim sentiments following September 11 attacks and subsequently ISIS attacks.	
Hajji, Hadji, Haji	United States	Muslims	Derived from the honorific Al-Hajji, the title given to a Muslim who has completed the Hajj (pilgrimage to Mecca).	
Wahhabi	Muslim world	Salafis	Derived from the name of its founder Muhammad ibn Abd al-Wahhab, it is used by opponents of his teachings in a derogatory way to refer to his followers, namely the Salafis.	
Nusayri	Muslim world	Alawites	Derived from the name of the founder of the group, Ibn Nusayr.	

== Hindus ==
Term	Location of origin	Targeted demographic	Meaning, origin and notes	References
Bongal	India (Assam & West Bengal)	Bangladeshi Hindus	The term is a derogatory slur used primarily in India's Assam and West Bengal, to refer to East Bengalis, mostly Muslims, but occasionally also for east Bengali Hindus or Bangladeshi Hindus, mocking them for being foreigners or outsiders.	
Cow piss drinker, piss drinker, Gaumutra	Islamic world	Hindus	Referring to the veneration of cows in Hinduism and consumption of the urine of cows by certain devout Hindus. Use led to the firing of an NPR reporter in 2019.	
Malaun	Bangladesh	Bangladeshi Hindus	Derived from Bengali মালাউন (maalaaun), which in turn was derived from Arabic ملعون (mal'un), which means 'cursed' or deprived from God's mercy.	
Dothead	United States	Hindu women	Referring to the practice of applying bindis, a dot-like marking used by married Hindu women. Also the namesake of a terrorist group from New Jersey that murdered elderly Indian women, known as the Dotbusters.	
Pajeet	Europe, North America	Hindus, Sikhs and other South Asians	A derogatory racist slur used in some parts of America and western countries to target Hindus, Sikhs and other South Asians.	

== Buddhists ==
Term	Location of origin	Targeted demographic	Meaning, origin and notes	References
Buddhahead	United States	Buddhist, specially Asian people	Also used by mainland Japanese Americans to refer to Hawaiian Japanese Americans since World War II.	

== Sikhs ==
Term	Location of origin	Targeted demographic	Meaning, origin and notes	References
Khalistani	India	Sikh (Khalsa Sikhs)	Used by anti-Sikh radicals, due to some extremists who advocate for a separate ethnic/religious homeland for sikhs, called Khalistan, following the Anti Sikh Riots.	
Lassi	India, Pakistan	Sikhs	In reference to the famous beverage Lassi, which sometimes is used a term used to denigrate Sikhs.	
Osama	North America	Sikh men (mistaken as Muslims)	After the 9/11 attacks, images of Ayatollah Khomeini, Osama bin Laden, and the Taliban, all of whom don a turban and have long-beards just like Sikhs, began to be circulated. Although originally a slur directed at Muslims, soon "Osama" became an anti-Sikh slur as well.	
Paki	United Kingdom	Sikhs	Short for Pakistani. Racism against South Asians, including Sikhs, peaked during the 1970's and early '80's in the United Kingdom, with all South Asians (mostly Muslims and Sikhs) being called "Pakis" by racists.	
Raghead	United Kingdom, United States, Canada	Sikh turban wearers (mistaken as Muslims)	In reference to the Sikh practice of wearing dastar (turban) resembling a durag	
Towelhead	United Kingdom, United States, Canada	Sikh turban wearers (mistaken as Muslims)	In reference to the Sikh practice of wearing dastar (turban) resembling a towel	

== Zoroastrians ==
Term	Location of origin	Targeted demographic	Meaning, origin and notes	References
Fire-worshipper	Iran and elsewhere	Zoroastrians	Referring to Zoroastrians' veneration of fire as sacred.	

== Yazidis ==
Term	Location of origin	Targeted demographic	Meaning, origin and notes	References
Devil-worshipper	the Muslim world and elsewhere	Yazidis	Due to confusion of the Peacock Angel of Yazidi belief with Satan.	

== Scientologists ==
Term	Location of origin	Targeted demographic	Meaning, origin and notes	References
Clam	United States	Scientologists	Referring to a passage about clam engrams in L. Ron Hubbard's 1952 book, What To Audit, later renamed Scientology: A History of Man.	

== African religions ==
Term	Location of origin	Targeted demographic	Meaning, origin and notes	References
Voodoo	United States	Vodouists, African diaspora people, particularly Haitian Americans	Used against people practicing any indigenous African religions to imply they are fraudulent and dangerous, with racialized connotations of curses and primitive superstitions. Used to justify Afrophobic legislation.	
Obeah	Jamaica	Practitioners of Obeah, Black Jamaicans	Used against practitioners of Obeah as well as people who receive services from Obeah priests. Connotation of being fraudulent, deceptive, vengeful, and uncivilized. Originally used by colonial authorities to suppress slave rebellions that were organized by Obeah spiritual leaders. Laws still exist in Jamaica criminalizing Obeah.	

== General non-believers ==
Giaour
Word for a person who is not Muslim, but especially for a Christian. Adapted from the Turkish gâvur. In the Ottoman Empire, it was usually applied to Orthodox Christians.
Heathen
A person who does not belong to a widely held religion (especially one who is not a Christian, Jewish, or Muslim) as regarded by those who do.
Infidel
A term used generally for non-believers.
Kafir
A derogatory term used by Muslims for a person who is a non believer. Not to be confused with the South-African slur Kaffir.
Murtad
A word meaning people who left Islam, mainly critics of Islam.
Mushrik
A person who doesn't believe in Tawhid (Islamic monotheism) and practices polytheism, worships idols, saints, ancestors or graves.
Pagan
A person who believes in a non-Abrahamic religion. Synonymous with heathen.
Savage
A member of a people the speaker regards as primitive and uncivilised. The term has also been applied to non-adherents of Christianity.
Shiksa (female), shegetz (male)
(Yiddish) A non-Jewish girl (generally still single) or boy, or one who is of Jewish descent but does not practise Orthodox Judaism. Primarily used to refer to non-Jews. See also "goy".

== Religious practitioners in general ==
Cult, cultist
Used as an ad hominem attack against groups with differing doctrines or practices.

== See also ==
- Hate speech
- Lists of pejorative terms for people
- List of ethnic slurs
