= Hijmans =

Hijmans is a Dutch surname, which refers to:

- Alex Hijmans (born 1975), Irish writer
- Abraham Albert Hijmans van den Bergh (1869–1943), physician specializing in internal medicine
- Ernst Hijmans (1890–1987), Dutch writer, engineer, and organisation adviser

== See also ==
- Heyman
- Heymann
- Heymans
- Heiman
- Hyman
