= Hymie =

Hymie may refer to:

- Hymie Buller (1926–1968), Canadian-born US All-Star NHL hockey player
- Hymie Gill (born 1973), New Zealand retired field hockey player
- Hymie Kloner (born 1929), South African former footballer
- Hymie Shertzer (1909–1977), American jazz saxophonist
- Hymie Weiss (1898–1926), Polish-American gangster rival of Al Capone
- Hymie Simon (1913–2011), American comic book writer
- Hymie, a recurring character on the television show Get Smart
- A religious slur applied to Jews

== See also ==
- Hyman Martin (1903 –1987), also known as "Pittsburgh Hymie", a mobster
- Hyman Holtz (c. 1896 – 1939?), "Little Hymie", New York racketeer
- Jamie
- Hyman
