= Höglund =

Höglund or Hoglund is a Swedish surname meaning "High Grove" and may refer to:

- August Höglund (1855–1926), Swedish convert to The Church of Jesus Christ of Latter-day Saints, first Mormon missionary to Russia
- Bo Höglund (born 1948), Swedish actor
- David Höglund Velasquez (born 1989), Swedish politician
- Greg Hoglund, author on computer security and computer hacking
- Gunnar Höglund (1923–1984), Swedish actor, film director and screenwriter
- Holger Höglund (1906–1965), Swedish film actor
- Jonas Höglund (born 1972), Swedish ice hockey player
- Kjell Höglund (born 1945), Swedish musician
- Malin Höglund (born 1969), Swedish politician
- Mikael Höglund (born 1962), Swedish bass player, of the bands Tryckvåg, Great King Rat and Thunder
- Panu Petteri Höglund (born 1966), Finnish linguist and novelist
- Sven Höglund (1910–1995), Swedish road racing cyclist
- Zeth Höglund (1884–1956), Swedish politician, author, journalist and mayor of Stockholm

== See also ==
- Hoglund Ballpark, a baseball stadium in Lawrence, Kansas
