= Reinhard Gebhardt =

Reinhard W. Gebhardt (1858 – May 28, 1920, in Greenville, Texas) was a German composer, violinist, and teacher, most active in New York. He was born in Anholt, Germany on April 3, 1858, to an extremely musical family.

== Upbringing and career ==
Gebhardt's father was a student of Felix Mendelssohn. (Note: He could be the German composer Ernst Gebhardt (1832-1899)) He began his musical studies with his father and brother, both of whom were highly skilled musicians. Shortly after, he moved to Holland and began his formal education, and continuing his musical development. He became a student of Hendrik Arnoldus Meijroos_{[nl]} (violinist), Rief (organ) (Note: There is little information on the identity of this teacher outside of a surname) while in Leipzig, and Hans von Bülow and Carl Heymann (piano). Following his study, returned to Holland whereupon he began a three-country performance tour shortly after in Holland, Belgium, and Germany.

After an unknown period, Gebhardt moved to America where he began a career as a teacher, composer, and performer. In 1886, Gebhardt performed as the pianist in a trio which performed through the Grand Conservatory of Music in New York. However, as his health began to fail he moved to Paris, Texas, where he continued his compositional career. According to the musical publication The Etude, he had won several prizes for his compositions. In 1916, he won the first prize for his piano work in the intermediate or advanced grade level. Around the mid-1910s, following his move to Paris, Texas he began the "Gebhardt College of Music." At his college, the subjects of piano, violin, voice, harmony, and composition were taught.

== Family ==
Gebhardt was married to Helena Barbara "Helen" Seibert and had three confirmed daughters, Theodora "Adelaide," Estelle Sophie, and Viola Gertrude.

== Compositions ==
- 1912: Graceful Dance (piano, Op. 36)
- 1912: Caprice (piano, Op. 51)
- Ballad (piano)
- Fantasie Impromptu (piano, Op. 45)
  - Nocturne
  - Theme and Finale
- Viola Waltz (Op. 38, dedicated to his daughter Viola)
- Nocturne Caprice (piano)
- When Two Dear Hearts Must Sever (voice and piano)
- Magic Spell
- Grand Festival March (1885)
- Polonaise in F Major (piano, Op.62)
- Une Miniature (piano)
