= Sofía Noel =

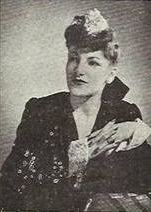
Sofía Noel (1944)

Sofía Noel, birth name Sophie Heyman, (1915–2011) was a Belgian-born Spanish soprano and ethnomusicologist who specialized in Sephardic music. After leaving Belgium to escape Nazi persecution, she settled in Barcelona where she worked with the composer Fernando Obradors. Shortly before his death in 1943, she sang to the accompaniment of the pianist Ricardo Viñes. In addition to singing and promoting Sephardic music, Noel also recorded Spanish songs from the Middle Ages, including those related to the country's Jewish and Arabic heritage.

== Biography ==
Born in Brussels, Belgium, as Sophie Heyman in 1915, she was the daughter of a Sephardic father and an Ashkenazi mother. During World War II, she escaped persecution by the Nazis by moving to Spain where she settled in Barcelona, changing her name first to Sophie Noël and later to Sofía Noel. She performed in the last concert of Ricardo Viñes in February 1943, singing to his piano accompaniment in the city's Palau de la Música Catalana. With the support of Fernando Obradors, she performed in concerts on the island of Gran Canaria in the mid-1940s.

Keen to present the history of Sephardic music, she participated in several radio programmes where she presented the results of her musicological research while singing pertinent songs herself. In particular, from the 1970s she presented the Radio Clásica series La vida en música and Los Pueblos Cantan su vida. In her recitals, Noel also presented other songs from the Middle Ages including songs in Hebrew and Yiddish as well as songs of Arabic origin. Her objective was to present the forgotten culture of Spain, in what she referred to as the "Spain of Three Cultures": Spanish, Jewish and Arabic.

Noel continued to lecture on Sephardic musical traditions until a few months before her death. Of particular note are the songs she performed on Radio Nacional de España as well as those she sang to the accompaniment of the guitarist Pierre Élie Mamou.

Sofía Noel died in Madrid on 27 December 2011.
