= Trumark Credit Union =

Credit union in Pennsylvania

- Company type: Credit union
- Industry: Financial services
- Founded: 1939
- Headquarters: Fort Washington, Pennsylvania, United States
- Area served: Southeastern Pennsylvania
- Key people: Kelly Botti (President & CEO)
- Products: Savings; checking; consumer loans; mortgages; credit cards; business banking; online banking
- Total assets: $3.5B USD (2025)
- Website: www.trumark.com

Trumark Credit Union (formerly TruMark Financial Credit Union) is a credit union headquartered in Fort Washington, Pennsylvania, near Philadelphia. The credit union serves members in the Southeastern Pennsylvania region, with branches in Bucks, Chester, Delaware, Montgomery, and Philadelphia Counties.

== History ==
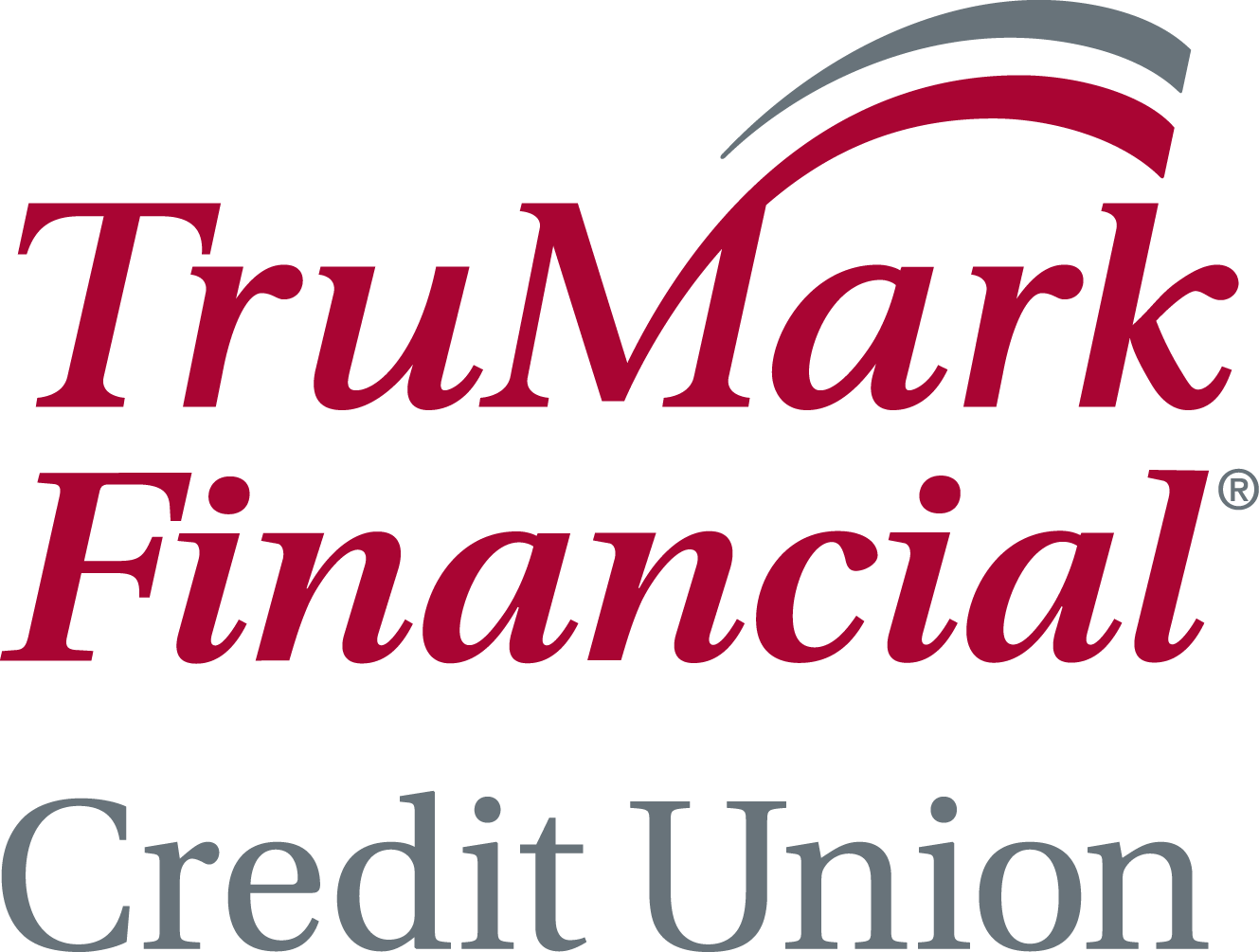
Former logo (2003-2026)

Trumark was founded in 1939 by a handful of Bell Telephone Company of Pennsylvania employees as the Bell Telephone Employees Credit Union. This eventually became the Philadelphia Federal Credit Union (unrelated to the present-day credit union with the same name); after switching from a federally-chartered credit union to a state-chartered credit union, it changed its name to the Philadelphia Telco Credit Union. In 2003, it changed its name to TruMark Financial Credit Union and filed an application to convert its charter and serve a community-based membership; prior to this, its membership was limited to 500 select employer groups located within Bucks, Chester, Delaware, Montgomery and Philadelphia Counties. In 2005, it received approval to operate under a community charter, expanding its membership to anyone who "lives, works, worships, volunteers, or attends school" in the Southeastern Pennsylvania region.

Since 2005, Trumark has acquired or assumed the assets of at least eleven regional credit unions, including the American Bakery Workers Federal Credit Union in 2015, Keystone Federal Credit Union in 2016, Philadelphia Mint FCU in 2018, and Bethany Baptist Christian Federal Credit Union in 2020.

In 2009, Trumark was the fifth-largest credit union in Pennsylvania; in 2025, it was the sixth-largest by total assets.

Trumark has been the namesake of the TruMark Financial Center, the indoor athletic arena of La Salle University, since providing a gift in return for the arena's naming rights in 2017.

In 2026, their name was changed to Trumark Credit Union.
