= Fair =

Gathering for entertainment or commerce

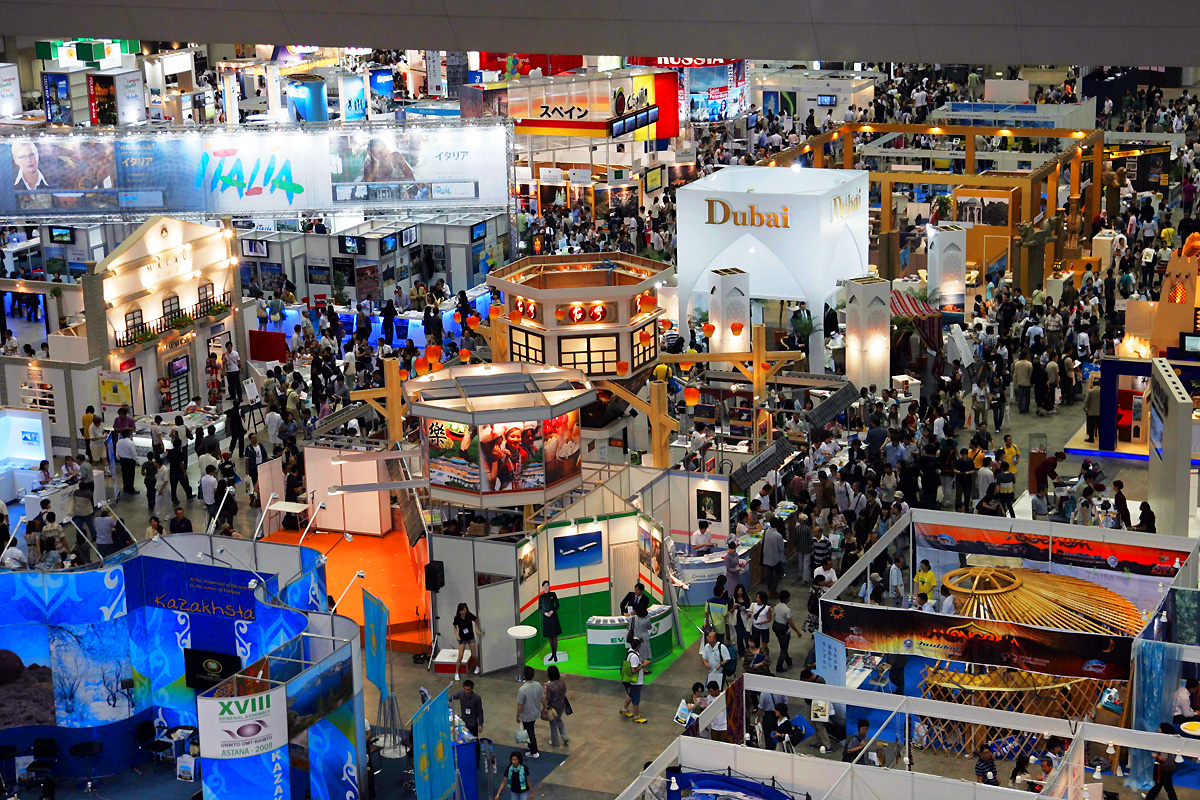
A trade fair for the travel industry

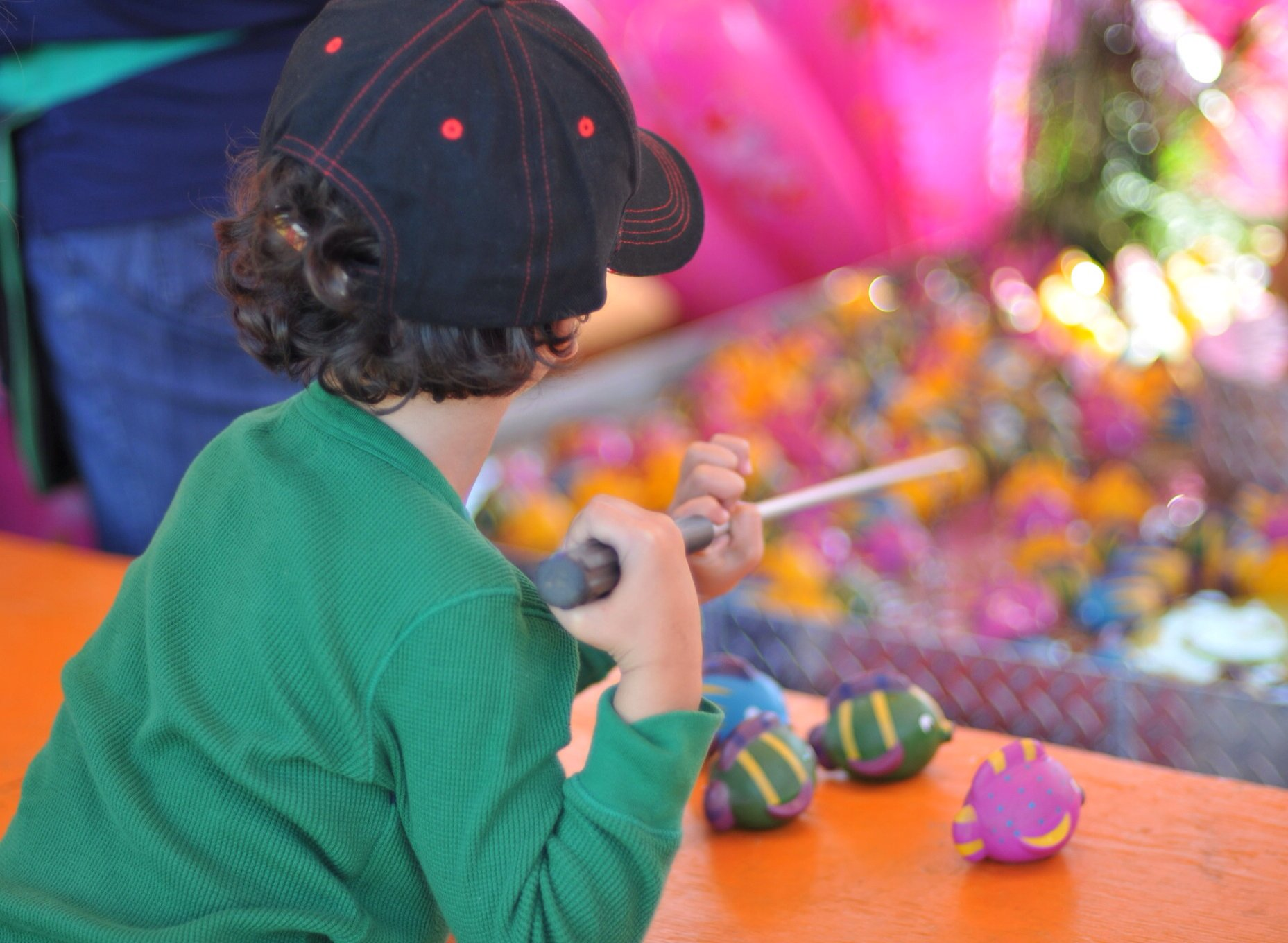
A boy at the fish pond, the Rockton World's Fair, harvest festival, Canada, 2010

A fair (archaic: faire or fayre) is gathering of people for a variety of entertainment or commercial activities. Fairs are typically temporary with scheduled times lasting from an afternoon to several weeks. Fairs showcase a wide range of goods, products, and services, and often include competitions, exhibitions, and educational activities. Fairs can be thematic, focusing on specific industries or interests.

Fairs have historically provided places for people to demonstrate their skills and crafts, exchange ideas with others, and barter for goods along major trade and pilgrimage routes. Fairs have also provided opportunities for travel, entertainment, commerce, and socializing, serving purposes beyond the exchange of goods.In the United States, fairs have played an important role in the social and economic lives of rural Americans. In the past, fairs provided places where people could meet and exchange goods. The report of an American manufacturing fair in 1846 lists manufactured products, including textiles, machinery, tools, and household goods.

The purposes of fairs have served different purposes depending on the time period it was held and the people that organized it. Some fairs focused on trade and selling products. Other fairs gave people the opportunity to gather for social or religious occasions. Fairs functioned as both market places and meeting places. These roles changed over time. The first national fair for the exhibition of American manufacturers focused on manufactured goods. It was held in Washington, D.C., in May 1846.

== Types ==
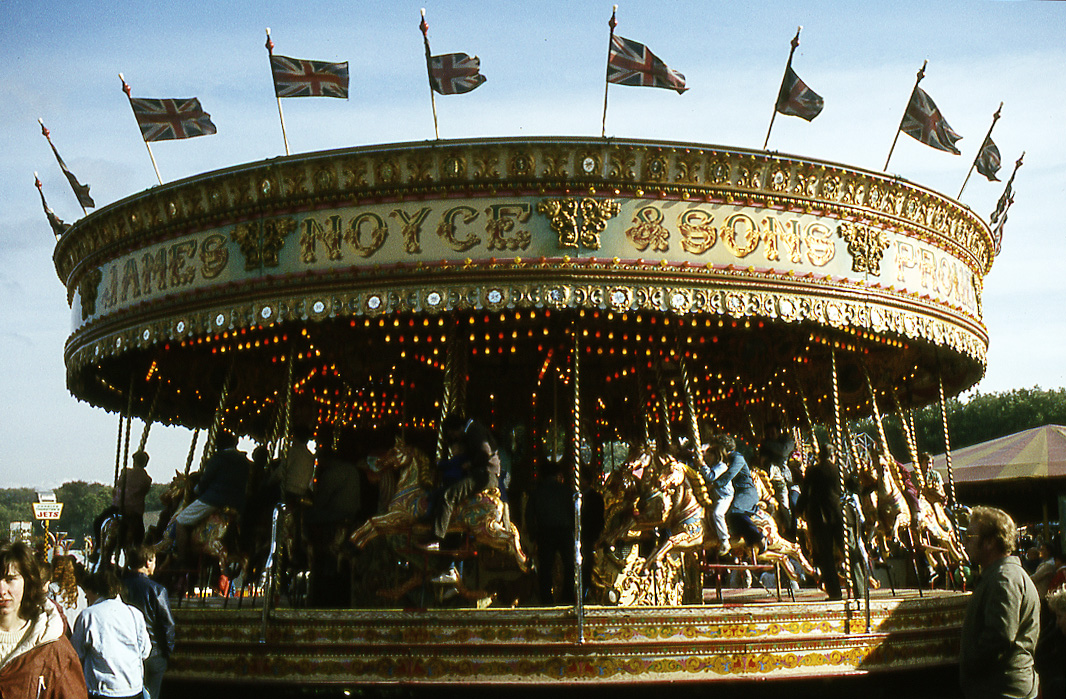
Roundabouts (also known as a carousel or merry-go-round) are traditional attractions, often seen at fairs.

Variations of fairs include:

- Art fairs, including art exhibitions and arts festivals
- Book Fairs in communities and schools provide an opportunity for readers, writers, publishers to come together and celebrate literature.
- County fair (United States) or county show (United Kingdom), a public agricultural show exhibiting the equipment, animals, sports and recreation associated with agriculture and animal husbandry.
- Festival, an event ordinarily coordinated with a theme e.g. music, art, season, tradition, history, ethnicity, religion, or a national holiday.
- Health fair, an event designed for outreach to provide basic preventive medicine and medical screening
- Historical reenactments, including Renaissance fairs and Dickens fairs
- Horse fair, an event where people buy and sell horses.
- Job fair, event in which employers, recruiters, and schools give information to potential employees.
- Regional or state fair, an annual competitive and recreational gathering. Including exhibits or competitors that have won in their categories at the local fairs.
- Science fair, a competitive event for entries employs the scientific method to test a hypothesis.
- A town/city's street fair or market, including charter fairs, celebrates character of a neighborhood and local merchants.
- Temple fair or miaohui, yearly fair held in temples of various religions
- Trade fair, an exhibition organized so that companies in a specific industry can showcase and demonstrate their latest products and services, study activities of rivals, and examine recent market trends and opportunities.
- Traveling funfair or carnival, an amusement show made up of amusement rides, food vending stalls, merchandise vending stalls, games of "chance and skill", thrill acts and (now less commonly) animal acts.
- Village fair or fête, an elaborate periodic festival, party or celebration. Held by the locals to original to celebrate a good harvests or religious gatherings.
- World's fair, an international exhibition designed to showcase achievements of nations

== History ==
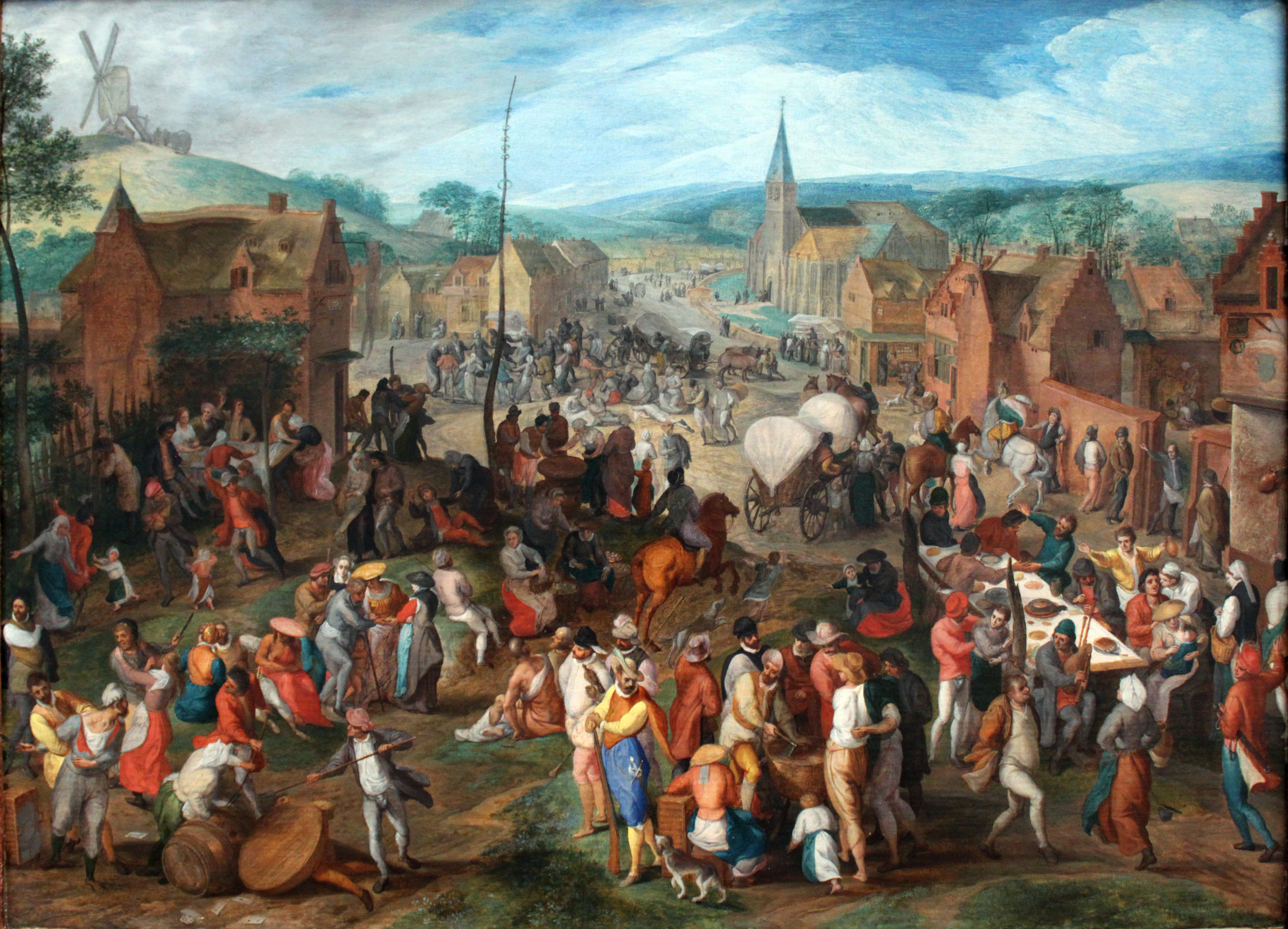
Village fair by Flemish artist Gillis Mostaert 1590

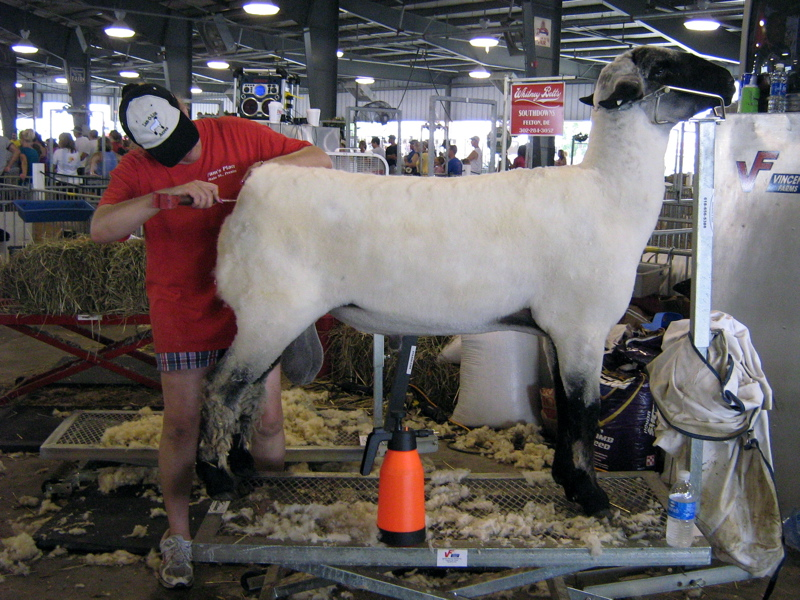
Fairs can include exhibitions of animals, and before competitions, the animals will be groomed by their owners.

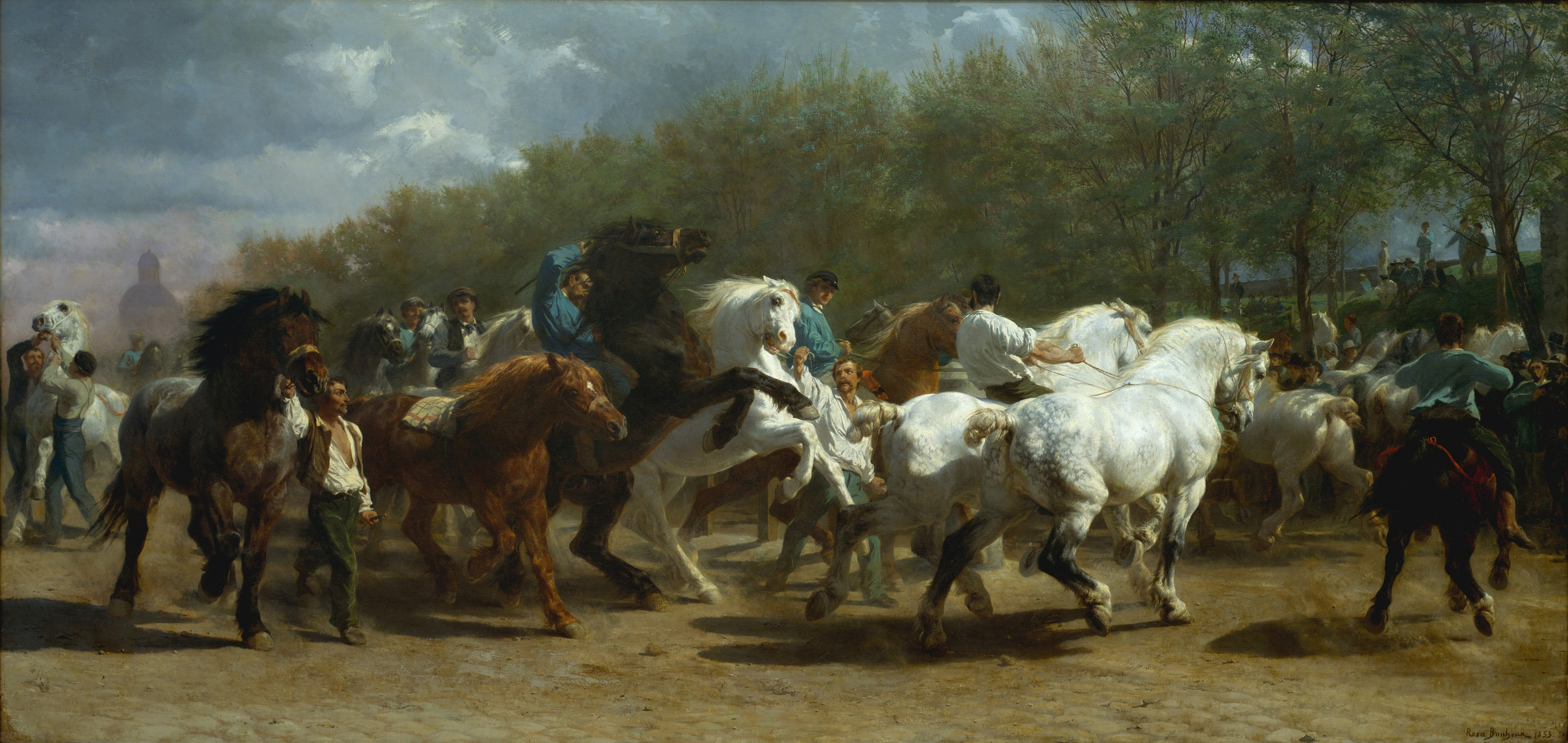
The Horse Fair, painting by Rosa Bonheur (1852–1855)

The Roman fairs were holidays on which work and business such as law courts were suspended. In the Roman provinces of Judea and Syria Palaestina, Jewish rabbis prohibited Jews from participating in fairs in certain towns because the religious nature of the fairs contravened the prescribed practice of Judaism.

In the Middle Ages, many fairs developed as temporary markets and were especially important for long-distance and international trade, as wholesale traders travelled, sometimes for many days, to fairs where they could be sure to meet those they needed to buy from or sell to. The most famous were the Champagne fairs in northern France, which were spread over six towns for a total period of about six weeks, drawing goods and customers from much of Europe. The Frankfurt Book Fair in Germany, still the largest trade fair for the publishing industry, began in the 12th century as a fair for manuscript books.

Fairs were usually tied to special Christian feast days, such as the day of the saint of the local church. Stagshaw in England, is documented to have held annual fairs as early as 1293 consisting of the sales of animals. Along with the main fair held on 4 July, the city also hosted smaller fairs throughout the year where specific types of animals were sold, such as one for horses, one for lambs, and one for ewes.

The Kumbh Mela, held every twelve years, at Allahabad, Haridwar, Nashik, and Ujjain is one of the largest fairs in India, where more than 60 million people gathered in January 2001, making it the largest gathering anywhere in the world. Kumbha means a pitcher and Mela means fair in Sanskrit.

In the United States, fairs draw in as many as 150 million people each summer. Children's competitions at an American fair range from breeding small animals to robotics, whilst the organizations National FFA Organization and 4-H have become the traditional associations.

Fairs have been around for a long time and have served different purposes in different places. According to the Library of Congress, early fairs included a large Aztec fair located at the present-day site of Mexico City, which was an example of fairs that developed along major trade routes. Fairs and festivals along trade and pilgrimage routes provided opportunities for people to demonstrate their skills and crafts, exchange ideas, and barter for goods.

Medieval fairs attracted people from different places, including visitors who traveled long distances to attend them. In On Markets & Fairs, written around 1270, Humbert de Romans explained that fairs attracted people from far away, stating that “to them come men from afar.”

De Romans also explained how fairs and markets served different purposes for the people who attended them. Fairs were held less frequently and attracted visitors from farther away, while markets usually took place every week and served people from nearby communities. These differences showed how fairs provided opportunities for people to participate in trade beyond their local areas. Markets, on the other hand, were more focused on everyday needs and the purchase of necessary goods. His descriptions help explain why fairs were important gathering places for people from different locations. They allowed visitors to come together to exchange goods and take part in activities that were not limited to their local communities. The differences between fairs and markets also show how people used these gatherings for different reasons depending on their needs.

The 1846 report of the First National Fair for the Exhibition of American Manufactures documents an American fair where manufactured goods were exhibited.

== Legacy ==
=== Legal implications ===
Fairs attracted great numbers of people and they often resulted in public order issues and sometimes riots. The holding of fairs was, therefore, granted by royal charter. Initially they were only allowed in towns and places where order could be maintained due to the presence of a bishop, sheriff or governor. Later various benefits were granted to specific fairs, such as the granting of a holiday status to a fair or protections against arrest for specific laws for the duration of the fair. Officials were authorised to mete out justice to those who attended their fair; this led to even the smallest fair having a court to adjudicate on offences and disputes arising within the fairground. These courts were called a pye powder court (from Old French pieds pouldres, literally "dusty feet", meaning an itinerant trader, from Medieval Latin pedes pulverosi).

Fairs have continued to provide opportunities for people to trade goods, learn about different products, and spend time together. According to the Library of Congress, fairs today offer “travel, entertainment, commerce, and socializing.”They also help people learn about rural and agricultural lifestyles through livestock competitions, crafts, and other exhibits. Livestock and agricultural competitions are common features of state and county fairs. These events also display traditional crafts, including quilting, lacemaking, rugmaking, baking, and canning. Visitors can see these items displayed and compete for awards such as “best of show.”

=== In art and language ===
The chaotic nature of the Stagshaw Bank Fair with masses of people and animals and stalls inspired the Newcastle colloquialism "like a Stagey Bank Fair" to describe a general mess.

The American county fair is featured in E. B. White's Charlotte's Web.

== See also ==
- Art exhibition
- Convention
- China fairing (a small porcelain ornament, so named because they were given away as prizes at fairs in the Victorian era)
- Lists of festivals
