= Hymans =

Hymans is a surname. Notable people with this surname include:

- Louis Hymans (1829–1884), Belgian writer, lecturer and politician
- Max Hymans (1900–1961), French politician and director
- Paul Hymans (1865–1941), Belgian politician

== See also ==
- Hyman
