= Heimans =

Heimans is a surname. Notable people with the surname include:

- Jeremy Heimans, Australian activist
- Levi Heimans (born 1985), Dutch cyclist
- Ralph Heimans (born 1970), Australian painter

== See also ==
- Heiman
