= John Glaser Arena =

Multi-purpose arena in Philadelphia, Pennsylvania

John E. Glaser Arena
- The Glaser
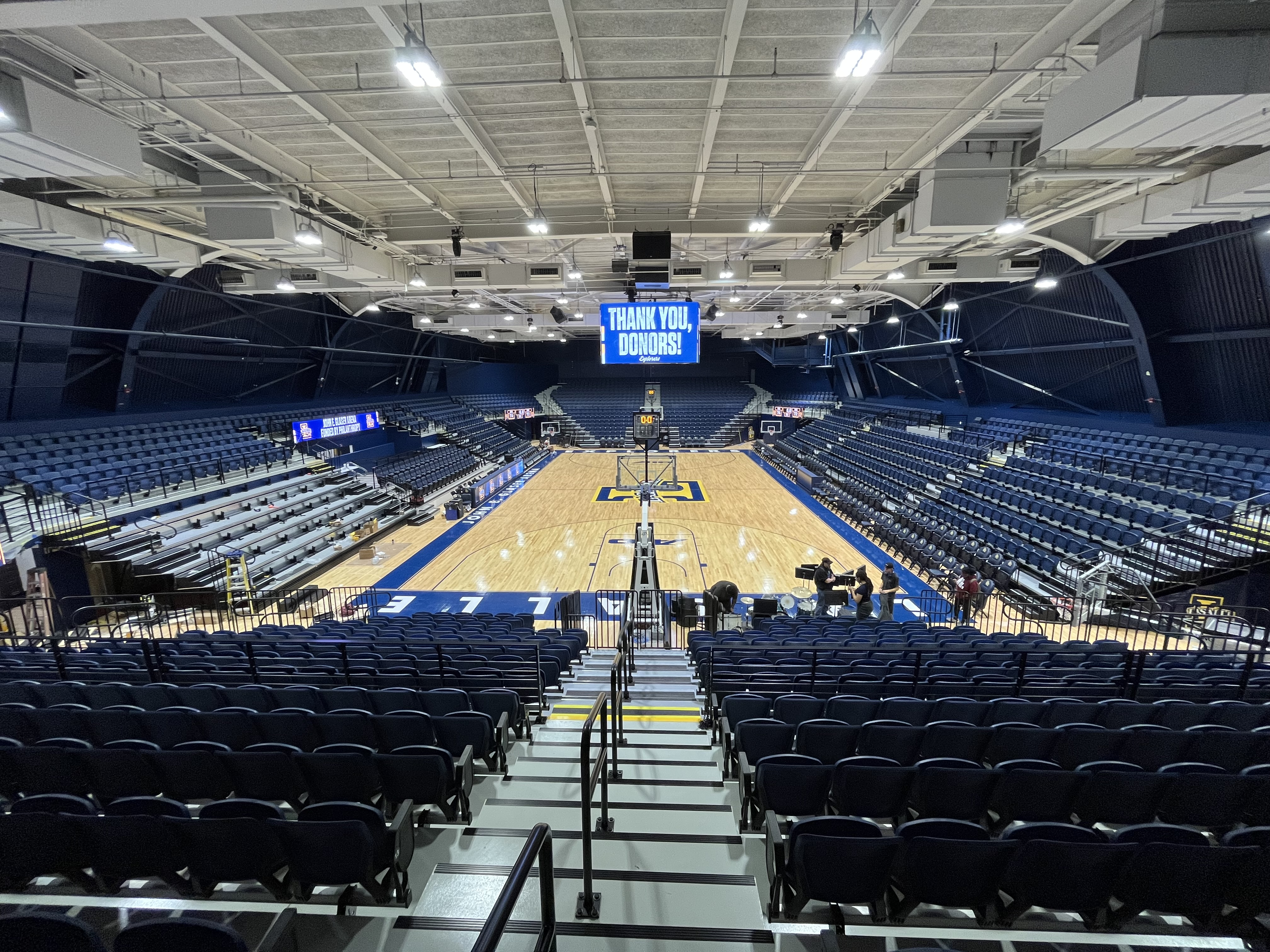
- John Glaser Arena in 2024
- Interactive map of John E. Glaser Arena
- Former names: Tom Gola Arena (1998–2024)
- Address: 15 Tom Gola Way; Philadelphia, PA 19141
- Coordinates: 40.039993°N 75.15654°W
- Owner: La Salle University
- Operator: La Salle University
- Capacity: 3,000
- Public transit: SEPTA bus: 18, 26

Construction
- Groundbreaking: May 17, 1997
- Opened: February 21, 1998 (as Tom Gola Arena); October 26, 2024 (as John Glaser Arena)
- Renovated: 2024
- Closed: March 3, 2024
- Cost: $6.3 million ($12.4 million in 2025 dollars)

Tenant
- La Salle Explorers (NCAA) (1998–present)

John E. Glaser Arena is a 3,000-seat multi-purpose venue in Philadelphia, Pennsylvania. The arena is situated inside TruMark Financial Center on the campus of La Salle University. It is home to the La Salle Explorers men's and women's basketball teams.

Opened in 1998, the arena was originally known as Tom Gola Arena. After undergoing renovations in 2024, the arena reopened as John Glaser Arena, named after John E. Glaser, a key donor for the renovation project. The arena was originally named after former Explorers captain and head coach Tom Gola, a member of the Naismith Memorial Basketball Hall of Fame.

== History ==
=== Tom Gola Arena ===
Tom Gola Arena was opened on February 21, 1998, with the men's basketball team defeating Virginia Tech 74–64. La Salle had not played basketball on campus since leaving Wister Hall in 1955, the season after winning the 1954 NCAA Championship. The Explorers played at the Palestra from 1955 to 1989, the Philadelphia Civic Center from 1989 to 1996, and the First Union Spectrum from 1996 until the arena opened in 1998. The arena hosted its final game on March 2, 2024, with the men’s basketball team defeating George Washington 72–66.

In Philadelphia's 2016 Summer Olympics bid, the arena was planned to host fencing.

In 2021, Adam Sandler used the Tom Gola Arena to film the Netflix movie Hustle. The arena was also equipped with two working smoke machines.

=== John Glaser Arena ===
In September 2023, La Salle revealed a plan to renovate Tom Gola Arena to create a 360-degree, bowl-style arena. The arena would be renamed to John Glaser Arena after John E. Glaser, a member of the school's class of 1962, whose estate provided a donation for the project. The renovation plans highlighted the need for an updated facility to meet the standards of a college basketball facility as well as a way to improve team performance. One key aspect was that Tom Gola Arena did not have seats behind the baskets; Glaser, a regular attendee at Explorers games, would track the shooting percentages of away teams at Gola Arena in a notebook, compared the statistics to other games, and concluded that the lack of fans behind the goals gave road teams an advantage when playing La Salle. In the new arena, the court was rotated 90 degrees to allow for a setup that included fans behind the baskets. Tom Gola Arena officially closed for renovations on March 3, 2024.

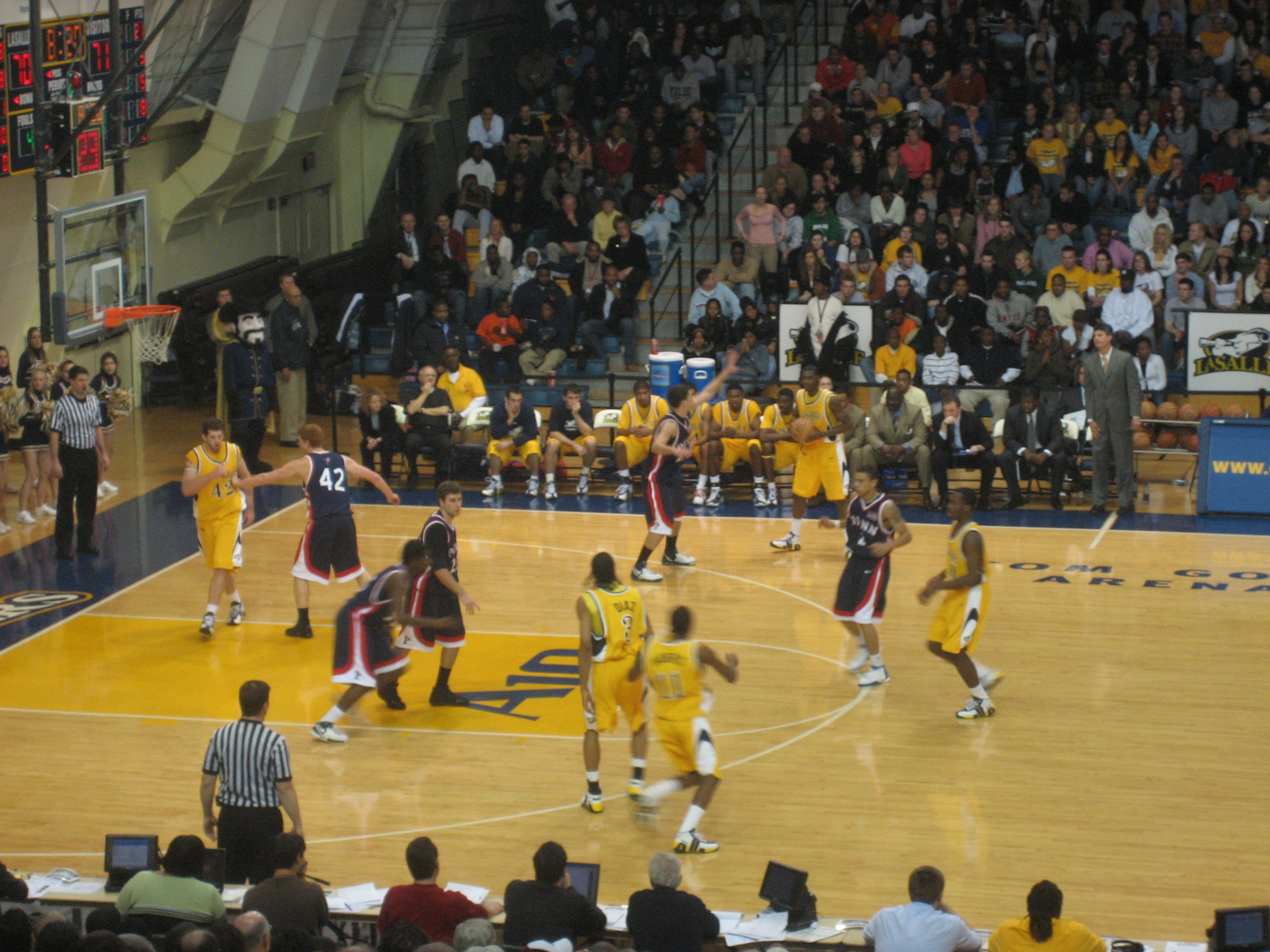
Tom Gola Arena in 2007 pre-renovation

John Glaser Arena opened on October 24, 2024, with Hoops Fest, a celebration to kick off the basketball season. Hoops Fest featured a live performance by American rapper DD Osama. John Glaser Arena hosted its first game on November 4, 2024 with the men's basketball team defeating the American Eagles 65–52.

== Features ==
The arena features 1,700 permanent seats, VIP seats, and retractable seating close to the floor. Four entrance tunnels are located in each corner of the court. A brand-new lighting, sound, and scoreboard system was implemented as well as a new men's locker room. Renovations were made to the concession area, bathrooms, and media room. The Olney Outlaws student section is located in sections 113 and 114. A concession area is located under section 112.

=== Tom Gola Plaza ===
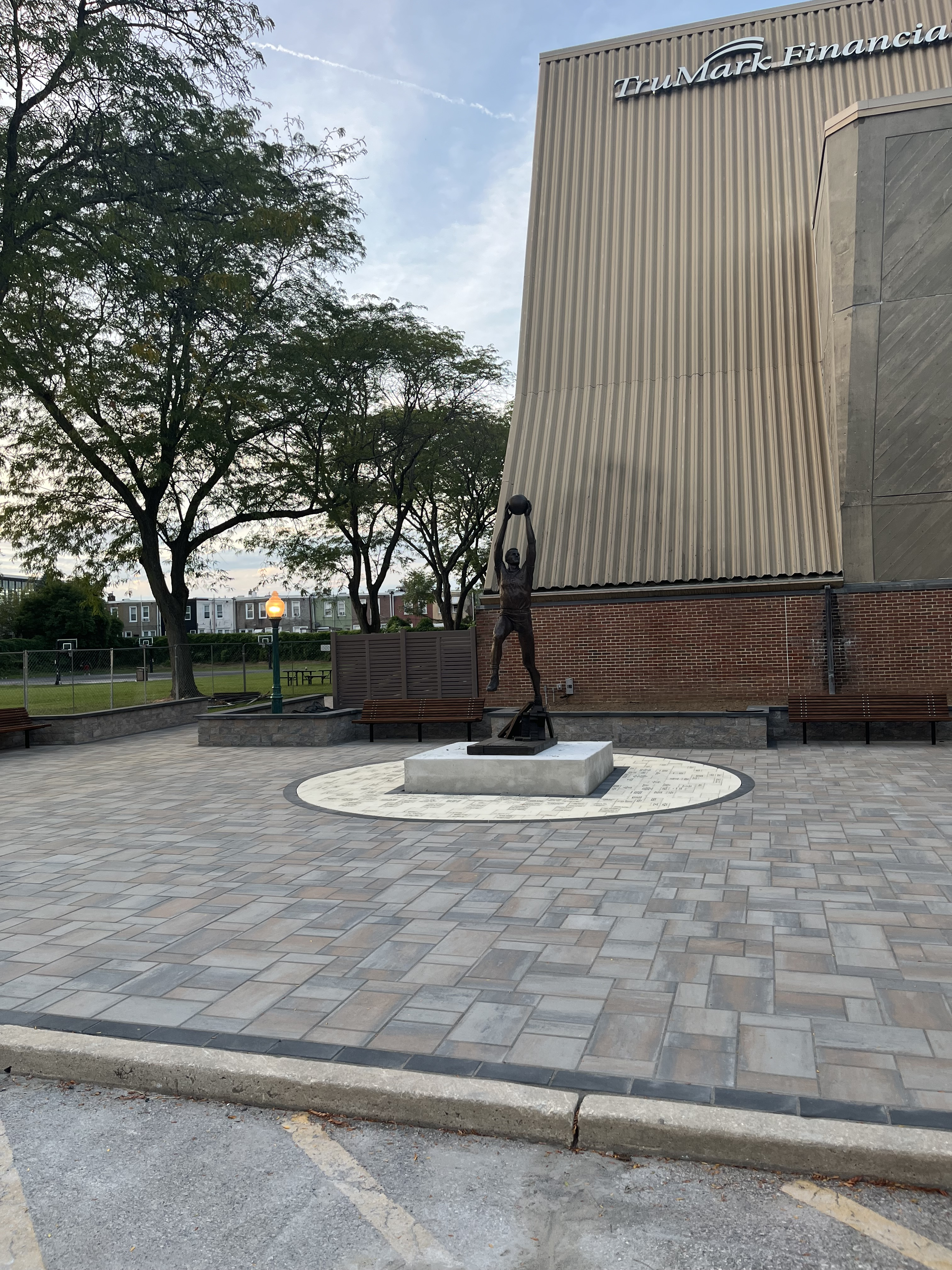
Tom Gola Plaza

To continue the namesake and legacy of Explorer's legend Tom Gola, a plaza outside of TruMark Financial Center was dedicated in his honor on September 26, 2024. The plaza features an existing statue of Tom Gola as well as new lights and benches, a newly constructed brick surface featuring the names of donors, as well as a historical marker.

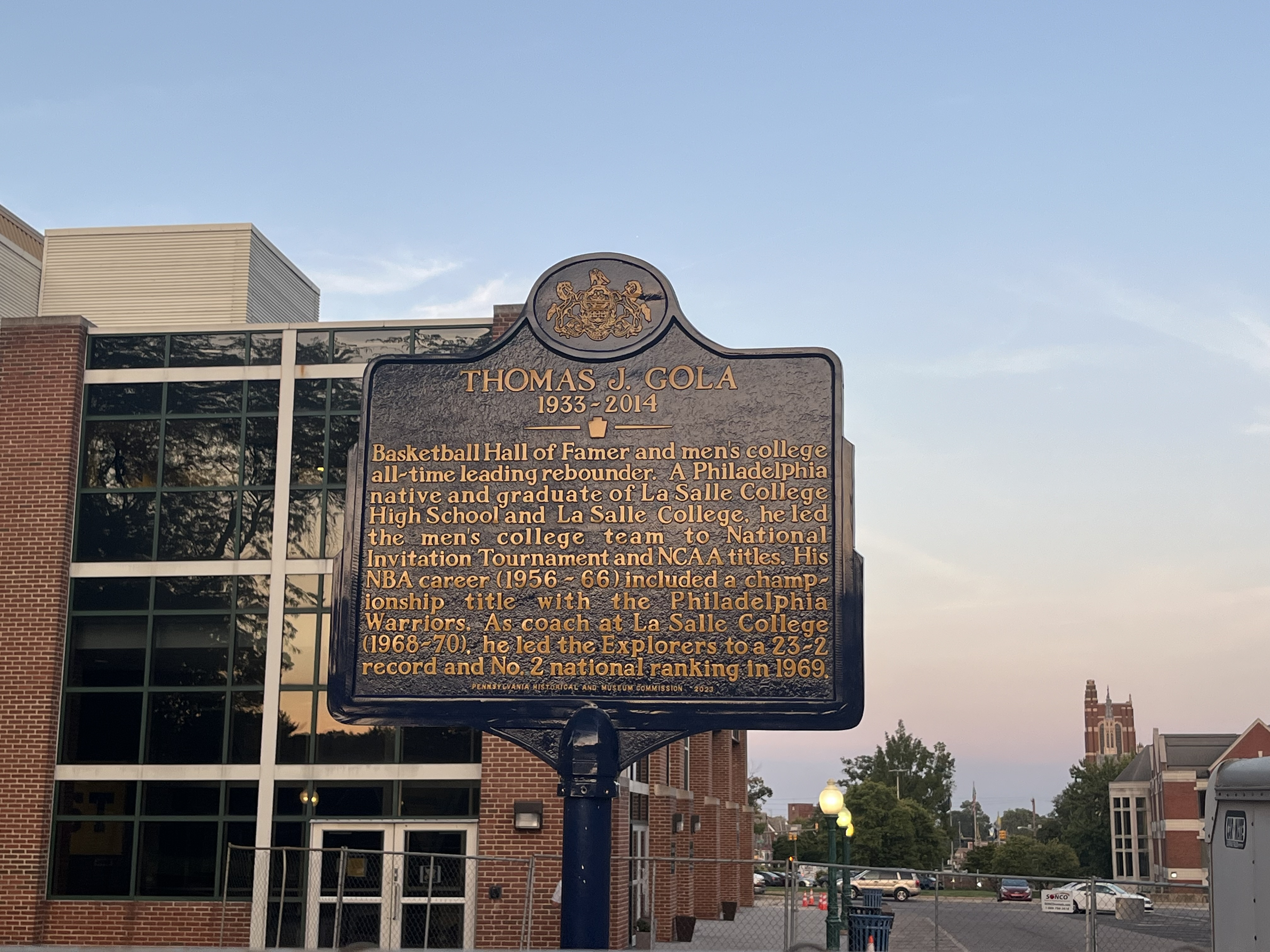
Pennsylvania state historical marker commemorating Tom Gola and his achievements

=== Tom Gola Way ===
The driveway in front of TruMark Financial Center was also renamed to Tom Gola Way.
