= Isaac Heymann =

Dutch composer (1829–1906)

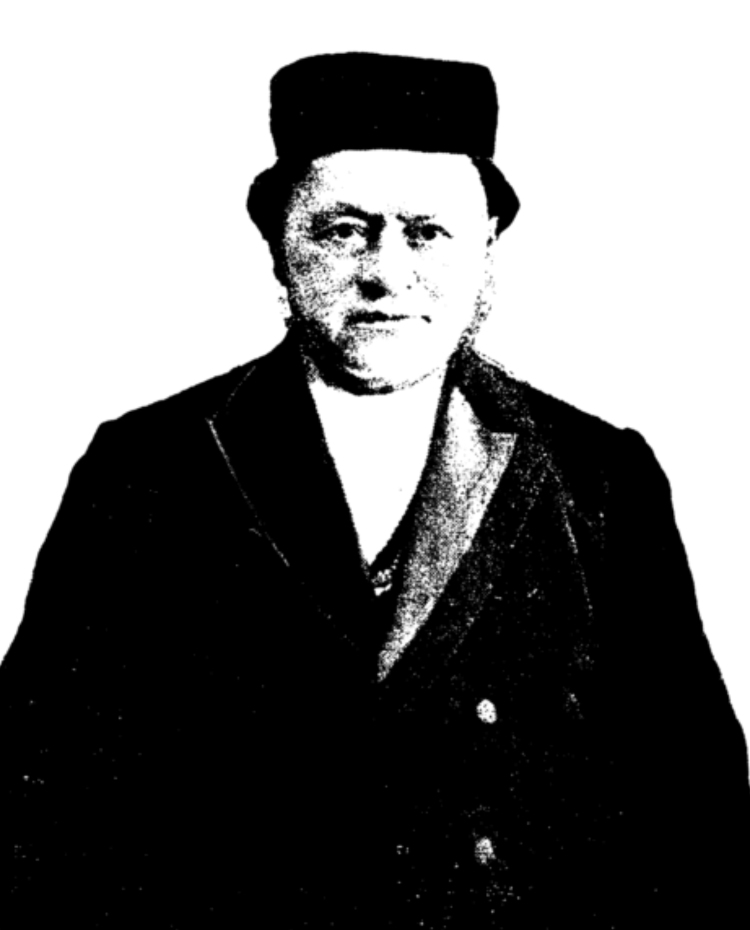
- Born: 26 March 1829; Auras, Silesia, Kingdom of Prussia
- Died: 9 August 1906 (aged 77); Amsterdam, Kingdom of the Netherlands
- Spouse: Rebecca Göttinger (died 1893)
- Children: Carl Heymann

Isaac H. Heymann (26 March 1829 – 9 August 1906), also known as the Gnesener Ḥazzan, was a Dutch cantor and composer.

== Biography ==
Isaac Heymann was born in Auras, Silesia. He was raised in Bialystok, where he received his first musical training from his father, the cantor Pinḥas Heymann. He had a natural talent for singing, and as a young boy he performed successfully as a tenor in various synagogues in Russia, Galicia, and Prussia.

After having made several tours through Hungary, Heymann served as cantor in Filehne, Graudenz, and Gnesen. In 1856 he was elected chief cantor for the Jewish congregation of Amsterdam, which position he held until his death fifty years later. He was naturalized as a Dutch citizen in 1881.

In addition to his duties as cantor, Heymann obtained a diploma as a composer from the Conservatory of Music in Cologne. He composed numerous synagogal melodies, including Shire Todah la-El, a collection of hymns dedicated to Queen Wilhelmina on the day of her coronation.

Heymann was highly respected in his profession. He was celebrated on several occasions for his contributions to music and the Jewish community, including on the occasion of his 25th, 40th, and 50th anniversaries as cantor. Heymann had a large family, including a son, Karl, who was a pianist and composer, and three daughters, Louise, Sophia, and Johanne, of whom the first two were singers and the last a pianist.

== Legacy ==
An exhibition in honour of the centenary of Heymann's birth was opened in Amsterdam in April 1929.
