= Juan Pablo Andrade =

Chilean footballer (born 1988)

Personal information
- Full name: Juan Pablo Andrade Moya
- Date of birth: 29 November 1988 (age 37)
- Place of birth: Molina, Chile
- Height: 1.84 m (6 ft 0 in)
- Position: Centre-back

Team information
- Current team: Comunal Cabrero

Youth career
- 2003–2007: Universidad de Chile

Senior career*
Years	Team	Apps	(Gls)
2007–2010	Universidad de Chile	0	(0)
2008	→ Iberia (loan)	–	(–)
2009	→ Magallanes (loan)	–	(–)
2010	Trasandino	–	(–)
2010–2015	Unión San Felipe	79	(5)
2012	Unión San Felipe B	3	(0)
2015–2016	Barnechea	29	(1)
2016–2017	Independiente Cauquenes	27	(2)
2017	Universidad de Concepción	1	(0)
2018	Ñublense	24	(0)
2019	Deportes Copiapó	25	(0)
2020–2021	Cobreloa	12	(0)
2021	Deportes Puerto Montt	25	(1)
2022	Rangers	21	(0)
2023–2024	San Antonio Unido	44	(3)
2025	Concón National	12	(1)
2026–	Comunal Cabrero	–	(–)
- * Club domestic league appearances and goals as of 31 December 2025

Juan Pablo Andrade Moya (born 29 November 1988) is a Chilean footballer who plays as a centre-back for Comunal Cabrero.

== Career ==
Born in Molina, Chile, Andrade came to the Universidad de Chile youth system at the age of 14. After signing his first professional contract, he was loaned out to Iberia and Magallanes in the Chilean third level. After a trial with Colo-Colo under Hugo Tocalli in the second half of 2009, he switched to Trasandino de Los Andes the next year.

He has played in Primera División and Primera B for Unión San Felipe, Barnechea and Universidad de Concepción. In January 2022, Andrade signed with Rangers de Talca.
