= HyMag =

Coordinates: 51.4942°N 0.0760°E

HYMAG (formerly the Hyman Archive) is a British archive of popular publications, based in London.

The archive was established by James Hyman, who for over 30 years has collected magazines, pamphlets, newsletters, brochures, ephemera and other printed material. The theme of Hyman's collecting is 'popular culture in print'. Originally, he began collecting to assist his research at MTV Europe, where he was a script writer and programme producer. This was in a period where, according to Hyman, "magazines were the internet".

As of October 2020, HYMAG's focus was to ensure preservation of the physical archive and digitisation of the entire collection via a crowdfunding page.

== Collection ==
Hyman Archive contains over 5,000 individual title publications and over 150,000 individual issues as at April 2019, although the collection is still growing at approximately 30% per annum through daily donations. The collection spans the period 1800s to the present day. More than 55% of the title publications are not to be found in the British Library. Independent publishers represent 75% of the title publications in The Hyman Archive. Condé Nast and Bauer Media are the two largest contributors to the Archive, representing 3% each of the total title publications. Hyman Archive includes a broad-array of subject matter, including film, TV, music, music videos, art, fashion, architecture, interior design, trends, youth, lifestyle, women's and men's magazines, technology, sports, photography, counter-culture, graphics, animation, and comics.

On 1 August 2012, Guinness World Records verified that "The largest collection of magazines consists of 50,953 magazines and belongs to James Hyman (UK), in London". At that time, the collection had 2,312 unique publications amongst the 50,953 magazines. The process of counting the magazines took approximately 128 days as Hyman and Tory Turk worked their way through 450 crates filled with magazines.

In 2018, Hyman Archive obtained the Hans Tasiemka Archive, a large collection of newspaper and magazine clippings that has been a popular resource with British journalists. The archive was maintained by Hans Tasiemka until his death in 1979. It was then managed by his widow Edda Tasiemka until it was transferred in the year before she too died.

== History ==
The archive's activity includes loans to broadcast & exhibitions such as the first NME to the BBC for its Britannia series (Pop Charts Britannia: 60 Years of the Top 10), Amazon's pop-up trainer exhibition, the Victoria and Albert Museum's David Bowie Is, Northampton Museum and Art Gallery', "Fashion Galore!", "The Jam: About The Young Idea" at Somerset House and "California: Designing Freedom" and "Electronic: From Kraftwerk To The Chemical Brothers" both at Design Museum

The archive has been profiled in various publications including The New York Times, "All Good Magazines Go To Heaven", Evening Standard, "Inside London's biggest magazine archive" as well as TV & Radio including ITV News, BBC Radio 2's Jeremy Vine Show, BBC London Live with Vanessa Feltz, TalkRadio with James Max and 'Word In Your Attic' hosted by David Hepworth & Mark Ellen.
