= William Heymann =

English cricketer

William Goodall Heymann (26 October 1885 — 27 November 1969) was an English cricketer. He was a right-handed batsman and a left-arm medium pace bowler who played for Nottinghamshire.

== Life ==
William Goodall Heymann was born on 26 October 1885 at West Bridgford Hall in Nottingham. He was of German descent. Heymann was educated at Haileybury and Imperial Service College, where he played from 1902 to 1904, captaining the team during his last year.

Heymann made a single first-class appearance, during the 1905 season, against Middlesex. As a lower order batsman, Heymann did not bat during the match, the team declaring their only innings after centuries from Arthur Jones and George Gunn. He bowled 23 overs during the match, taking two wickets. In 1906, he was invited to play in six County matches, which he declined. Heymann was a member of Nottingham Amateurs Cricket Club for a number of years.

Heymann worked as a farmer on Framland Lodge, Long Clawson, where he died on 27 November 1969, at the age of 84 years old.
