= Robert J. Haiman =

Robert Haiman
- Born: 1937 (age 88–89)
- Occupations: Reporter; Editor

Robert J. Haiman is a nationally recognized journalist. At the St. Petersburg Times, he notably served as a reporter, wire desk chief, then as Managing Editor and Executive Editor. Later Haiman served as the President of the Poynter Institute for Media Studies, and was in that position until 1996.

== Education ==
Haiman received his Bachelor's degree from the University of Florida back in 1958.
