= James Hyman =

British DJ

- Born: 18 April 1970 (age 56)
- Origin: United Kingdom
- Occupations: Founder of Hyman Archive, DJ, music supervisor
- Years active: 1988–present
- Website: www.jameshyman.com

James Hyman (born 1970) is a British radio and television presenter, music supervisor, DJ and the owner and founder of HYMAG.

Hyman studied Film & Media at London Guildhall University (1989–1992, BA Hons, 1st), whilst working at MTV Europe despite his parents' misgivings (partly because of his father's glimpse of the music industry through his cousin Brian Epstein).

== HYMAG ==
For over 30 years, Hyman has been collecting magazines, pamphlets, newsletters, brochurees, ephemera and other printed material. The theme of Hyman's collecting is "popular culture in print". Originally, he began collecting to assist his research at MTV Europe, where he was a script writer and programme producer. This was in a period where, according to Hyman, "magazines were the internet".

HYMAG contains over 5,000 individual title publications and over 150,000 individual issues as of January 2020.

On 1 August 2012, Guinness World Records verified that, "The largest collection of magazines consists of 50,953 magazines and belongs to James Hyman (UK), in London, UK". At that time, the collection featured 2,312 unique publications amongst the 50,953 magazines. The process of counting the magazines took approximately 128 days as James and Tory Turk worked their way through 450 crates filled with magazines.

As of October 2020, HYMAG's focus was to ensure preservation of the physical archive and digitisation of the entire collection via a crowdfunding page.

== TV ==
Hyman worked at MTV Europe from 1988 to 2000, as a press officer then as a programmer, producer and director. His MTV shows, including Party Zone featured in-depth interviews with the likes of The Prodigy, Goldie, Moby, David Holmes, The Chemical Brothers, Underworld, Paul Oakenfold, and Aphex Twin.

Hyman also co-presented MTV's Up For It and fronted a spin-off from MTV's Bytesize programme, providing daily reports on internet news and web sites.

In 1992, with Coldcut, he produced a TV megamix for Canal+ weekly pop-culture show, pre-empting his MTV megamix format and shows that began broadcast on MTV Europe in 1998.

== Radio ==
Presented on Atlantic 252 and Xfm London as producer / presenter of The Rinse and co-presenter / producer of The Remix, the latter nominated for 2003 Sony Radio Academy Award.

The Rinse focused on dance music with Hyman also championing other emerging music trends such as bastard pop. The Remix focused on mash-up remixes and, according to The Guardian, "led the craze" which caused some controversy when a cease and desist order was issued for playing "A Stroke of Genius" by The Freelance Hellraiser.

The Xfm shows paved the way for the release of a number of albums:

- The Remix and The Remix 2 (Virgin/EMI)
- Covered (Sony BMG)
- 8 themed mix CDs including: Pulp Mixin which remixed the work of Quentin Tarantino and Licence to Thrill, an audio homage to James Bond, which featured in The Daily Telegraph's top 5 CDs of 2004.

September 2007, Hyman left Xfm to concentrate on his music supervision company JLH and other broadcast projects.

A one-hour documentary about Paul Anka and his song "My Way" was produced by Hyman and Nick Minter as part of BBC Radio 2's series Song Stories, first broadcast 23 February 2011. It was presented by Michael Buble and featured interviews with David Bowie, Donald Trump, Julien Temple and Steve Wynn on BBC Radio 2.

== Films ==
Hyman expanded his Quentin Tarantino mix tape, Pulp Mixin', to create a feature-length mash-up film, with the provisional title James Hyman/Quentin Tarantino Movie Mash-Up. It blends Tarantino's film footage with music videos, including those of the music used in the films.
