= Fernando Obradors =

Spanish composer (1897–1945)

- Born: 17 October 1896
- Died: 9 October 1945 (aged 48)
- Era: 20th century

Fernando (Ferran) Jaumandreu Obradors (1896–1945) was a Spanish composer.

Obradors was taught piano by his mother, but taught himself composition, harmony and counterpoint. He became conductor of the Gran Canaria Philharmonic Orchestra, and later taught at Las Palmas Conservatory. Between 1921 and 1941 he wrote four volumes of arrangements of classic Spanish poetry, "Canciones clásicas españolas".

He is best known for the song cycle which is volume one. One of the poems, "La casada infiel", was written by his friend Federico García Lorca. Although he wrote many works for the theatre, none have held their place in the repertoire. His orchestral work "El Poema de la Jungla" is inspired by The Jungle Book stories by Rudyard Kipling. Many of his contemporaries left Spain to find fame in France, but Obradors remained true to his Catalan roots. His first surname is sometimes split into two Catalan names – Jaume Andreu.
