= Panu Petteri Höglund =

Finnish linguist, translator and fiction writer

Panu Petteri Höglund (born 17 November 1966 in Kalvola) is a Finnish linguist, translator and fiction writer. Despite his Finnish background, his chief literary medium is the Irish language, in which he has published a number of novels and short stories.

== Biography ==
Höglund spent his early life in Varkaus in a bilingual Finnish-Swedish environment. He studied chemistry, Polish and Russian and acquired an MA in Germanic studies from Åbo Akademi (the Swedish University of Finland) in 1997. He acquired an interest in Ireland and the Irish language from articles and television, and in 1998 attended an Irish-language course at Carraroe in Connemara. Much of his knowledge of the language was derived, however, from his own studies, with an especial emphasis on the Irish of Ulster.

Höglund commenced an Irish-language blog in 2005 and published his first book in Irish, Sciorrfhocail, in 2009. He has been a regular contributor of fiction to the American-based Irish-language magazine An Gael. In 2009 Höglund published an article on the sociolinguistics of Irish in which he rejected the “dead language discourse” and stated that Irish should be seen, in principle, as just another minority language, and one in better shape than many.

In addition, Höglund has published scholarly articles on aspects of Irish-language literature.

In addition to Finnish, Swedish, English and Irish, Höglund has a knowledge of Polish, Russian and Icelandic. He has translated into Finnish four novels by the Icelandic novelist Einar Kárason.

== Publications ==
- Sciorrfhocail: Scéalta agus úrscéal. Cathair na Mart, Co. Mhaigh Eo, Éire: Evertype.com, 2009. ISBN 978-190-4-80831-2. Amazon - see inside,
- An Leabhar Nimhe: Scéalta agus aistriúchán. Cathair na Mart, Co. Mhaigh Eo, Éire: Evertype, 2012. ISBN 978-1-78201-021-0.
- An Leabhar Craicinn: Scéalta earótacha. Cathair na Mart, Co. Mhaigh Eo, Éire: Evertype, 2013. ISBN 978-1-78201-027-2.
- An tSlaivéin. Cathair na Mart, Co. Mhaigh Eo, Éire: Evertype, 2013. ISBN 978-1-78201-043-2.

=== Translations ===
- Isaac Asimov: An Fhondúireacht (original title: Foundation), Cathair na Mart, Co. Maigh Eo, Éire: Evertype, ISBN 978-1-78201-080-7.

== See also ==
- Modern literature in Irish
- Alex Hijmans
