= Rupert Butler =

British author

- Born: January 18, 1933
- Occupation: historian

Rupert Butler (born January 18, 1933) is a British author. He is the son of Lt.-Col. Patrick Richard Butler and Rhona Curzon (the daughter of Assheton Nathaniel Curzon).

== Career ==
Butler's many books include Gestapo: The Truth Behind the Evil Legend, which has been translated into Spanish, Portuguese, Polish, Russian, German, and Danish. Among his other books are The Black Angels: A History of the Waffen SS, Legions of Death: The Nazi Enslavement of Eastern Europe, and SS-Leibstandarte Adolf Hitler: The History of the First SS Division 1933-45. Legions of Death is frequently employed by Holocaust deniers to support claims that the various confessions of Rudolph Hoess were obtained through torture.

Butler's most recent books are on Russia; "Stalin's Instruments of Terror", an illustrated account of the life of the Soviet dictator was published in 2006, and "Stalin's Secret War" (2010).

Butler currently lives in London.
