= Anthony Hyman (disambiguation) =

Anthony Hyman (1946–1999) was a British writer, broadcaster, and Middle East expert.

Anthony Hyman may also refer to:

- Anthony A. Hyman (born 1962), British biologist, son of R. Anthony Hyman
- R. Anthony Hyman (1928–2011), British historian of science, father of Anthony A. Hyman

== See also ==
- A. P. Hamann (Anthony Hamann), city manager of San Jose, California
