= Daniel Heymann =

Argentine economist (born 1949)

Daniel Heymann (born 1949) is an Argentine economist. He studied physics and economics in Universidad de Buenos Aires. He later had a PhD at UCLA. His mentor was Axel Leijonhufvud. He worked at CEPAL. He won the Konex Award from Argentina.

== Books ==
- High Inflation: The Arne Ryde Memorial Lectures (1995) (together with Axel Leijonhufvud, Heymann wrote this book)
- A Study in Economic Instability: The Case of Argentina (1983)
- Las fluctuaciones de la industria manufacturera Argentina, 1950-1978 (1980)
- Life After Debt (2014) (edited with Joseph Stiglitz)
- Economía de Fronteras Abiertas. Exploraciones en Sistemas Sociales Complejos (with Perazzo and Zimmermann)
