= Alex Hijmans =

Dutch multingual journalist and author (born 1975)

Alex Hijmans (born 1975) is a Dutch multingual journalist and author. He has published several works in the Irish language.

== Biography ==
Hijmans was born in 1975 in Heemskerk, Netherlands. He spent twelve years in Ireland, where he acquired fluency in the Irish language and engaged in media studies at the National University of Ireland, Galway. He then worked as a reporter for RTÉ and TG4 and for the defunct Irish language newspaper Foinse, and contributed to other publications, including The Irish Times. He moved to Brazil in 2008.

He has published a selection of books in Irish, including Favela, a non-fiction work about life in a Brazilian slum; novels Aiséirí and An Tearmann; and Gonta, a short story collection. His second collection of short stories in Irish, Idir Dhá Thír, was released in 2017.

Hijmans contributes to media outlets in Ireland and Britain and is the Brazil correspondent for DNP, a Dutch digital newspaper. He is a regular contributor to online Irish-language news website Tuairisc.ie.

== Published works ==
- Favela (Cois Life, 2009)
- Aiséirí (Cois Life, 2011)
- Gonta (Cois Life, 2012)
- Splancanna ó Shaol Eile (Cois Life, 2013)
- An Tearmann (Cois Life, 2016)
- Idir Dhá Thír (Cois Life, 2017)

== See also ==
- Panu Petteri Höglund
