= Walter Heiman =

Walter J. Heiman (March 12, 1901 in Essen, Germany – March 18, 2007 in University City, Missouri, United States) was a Jewish American man who at the time of his death had become one of the last surviving veterans and hero of the First World War.

== Early life and military service ==
Born and raised in Germany, he enlisted as a private in the German Luftstreitkräfte in March 1918, at 17 years of age, after finishing high school. He was sent to an air base in Hanover for flight training, but the war ended before he finished training. He talked vividly about the situation by explaining that the German Revolution broke out on November 9, 1918, which caused Kaiser Wilhelm II to abdicate and flee the country, and since at that point in time each soldier made his own decision about his immediate future, Walter decided to go home to Essen. After the Armistice, the city of Essen was occupied by the French Army. Walter's older brother Kurt had also served in the German Army earlier in the war and was wounded in 1916 at the Battle of the Somme. Kurt never fully recovered from his wounds that he suffered in the battle and died in 1920.

== Persecution and emigration ==
After the war Walter returned to Essen and went to work as an apprentice in the grain distribution business, which later led to him starting his own grain business in 1926. He was unable to pursue a college education because of Germany's discrimination laws on Jewish families that would not allow more than one Jewish sibling to attend college, and since his older brother Kurt was already in college this prevented Walter from enrolling. He married Trude Weyl from Kleve on the last day of 1935, and they had two children together.

After the Nazis took power in Germany in the 1930s, the hardships became much worse as Jewish assets were seized, and so Walter fled Germany to the United States in 1938 with his pregnant wife and only $25. His older sister Lily, parents and in-laws all were murdered in the Holocaust. After arriving in the United States, he and Trude initially stayed with relatives in Chicago, while he learned the English language in night school and from listening to the radio. They lived in Chicago until 1941 with very little means. Eventually, he became a United States citizen in 1945.

== Later life ==
In 1941, they moved to St. Louis, Missouri, where Walter opened a business selling Belgian light bulbs for a Western Extralite branch. He kept the business as it grew over time, even after his retirement in 1989, at which time he still remained chairman of the board, but then eventually sold the company in 1999 to the family of his original business partner in 1941.

In the 1950s, they moved to Olivette, Missouri, where he and Trude continued raising their two children.

Walter was active in sports like tennis, soccer, snow skiing and swimming. In fact, he was still a swimmer until the age of 103.

Heiman had once dined with Leah Rabin, the wife of Israel's Prime Minister Yitzhak Rabin. They had been at one of Israel's Children's Centers, which are built by a program that Mr. Heiman supported. These centers are built for Israel's immigrant and underprivileged children, and they have both learning centers and tennis courts.

After his wife's death in 1994, Walter moved to an elderly complex in University City, where he resided until his own death at the age of 106.
