= Heymans =

Heymans is a surname. Notable people with the surname include:

- Adriaan Jozef Heymans, Belgian painter
- Catherine Heymans, British astrophysicist and Astronomer Royal for Scotland
- Cédric Heymans, French rugby player
- Corneille Heymans (1892–1968), Belgian physiologist
  - Heymans (crater), a lunar impact crater, named after him
- Émilie Heymans, Canadian diver (born in Belgium)
- Gerardus Heymans (1857–1930), Dutch philosopher & psychologist
- Jonas Heymans, Belgian footballer
- Margriet Heymans, Dutch writer and illustrator of children's literature
- Mau Heymans, Dutch artist and writer, known for his work on Disney comics

== See also ==
- Chayyim, the basis for this name
- Heyman
- Hijmans
