= China fairing =

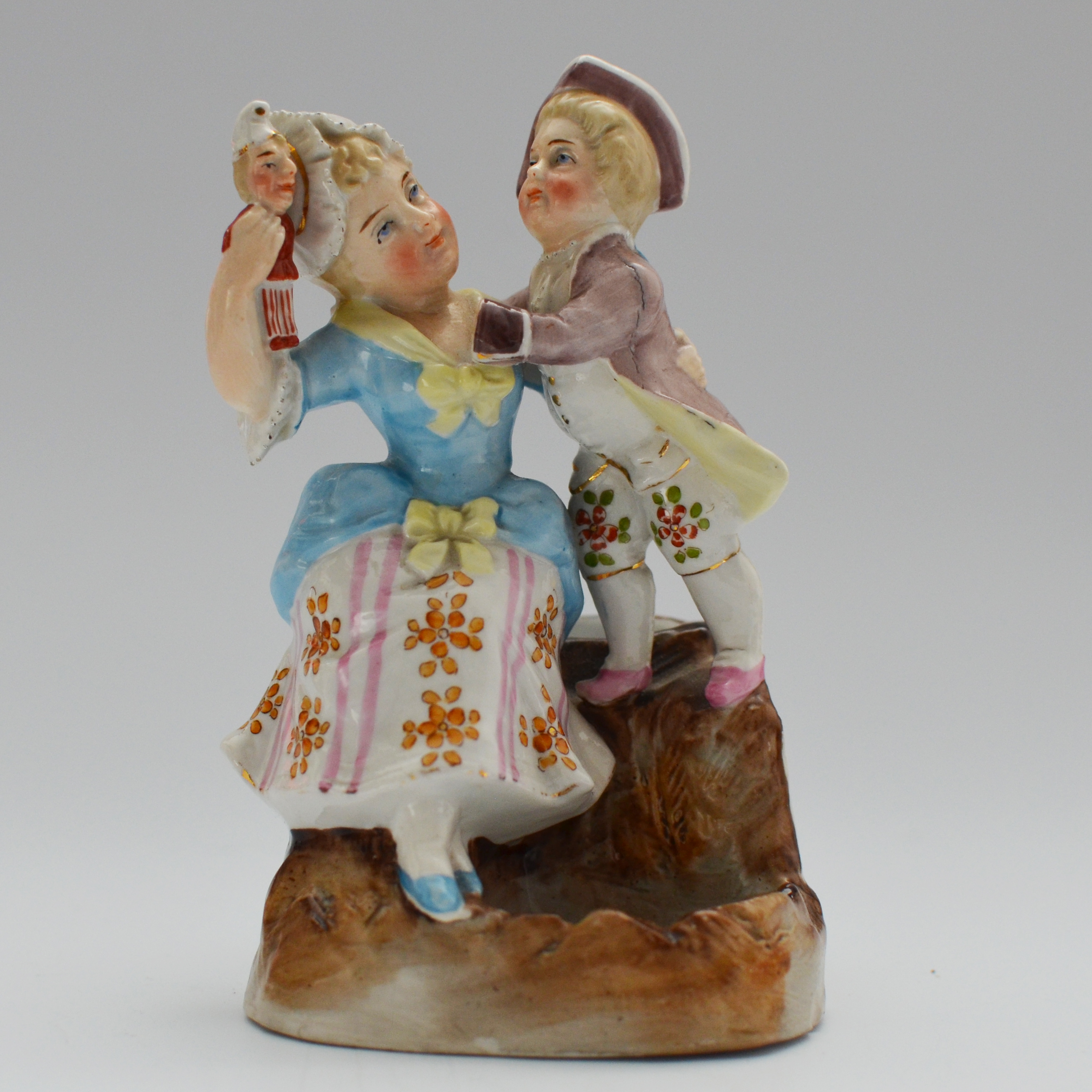
Conta & Böhme matchholder and striker, around 1900

A china fairing is a small porcelain ornament, often incorporating figures, ranging from about three inches (7.5 cm) to about five inches (12.5 cm) in height, and depicting a variety of scenes, humorous, political or domestic. The ornament almost always incorporates a base and many fairings have a caption describing the scene or making some point inscribed on that base. Although the majority of fairings are simply decorative, they were occasionally made in the form of pin boxes, match strikers or holders for watches or small mirrors. Some fairings were made in pairs, for example, "Grandpapa - Grandma", two separate statuettes of a small boy and girl, each dressed in adults' clothing.

China fairings are so named because they were given away as prizes at fairs in the Victorian era, in much the same way that one might win a coconut at a fair today, although some were manufactured simply for sale. They first started appearing in the middle of the nineteenth century and remained popular until the start of the First World War.

Genuine fairings are now keenly sought by serious collectors. In the United Kingdom they can range in price from a few pounds for the more common ones (such as "Last in bed to put out the light") to several hundred pounds for the rarer ones, the most keenly sought being the five fairings the Vienna series (uncaptioned, but characterised by a gold band around the base). As with any antique, the value of a fairing depends on its condition - they are particularly delicate and damage of any sort can seriously reduce their value - and, in the case of fairings that are paired, whether they are offered singly or with their partners.

Most fairings were manufactured in Germany by Conta and Boehme. This company developed a mass production method that no other company could match, thereby achieving an advantage over other firms.

== Captions ==
The subject matter that inspired fairings varies widely and provides an interesting insight into the popular culture of the Victorian era. Popular songs and music hall numbers inspire some of them, such as "Jenny Jones and Ned Morgan" and "Champagne Charlie is my name". Others commemorate notable people or buildings such as Ladies of Llangollen (relating to the scandalous affair of Lady Eleanor Butler and Lady Sarah Ponsonby) or "The Model of Laxey" (the Laxey Wheel on the Isle of Man, the largest metal water wheel in the world). The captions on some fairings are a little more obscure, such as "How's business?" (on one fairing) and "Slack!" (on its partner). These were inspired by the same design on a drinking cup from the period.

Beds feature heavily in the domestic scenes, so much so that fairings were once known as "bedpieces". The captions on these fairings often indicate a cynical attitude to marriage, for example "When a man is married his troubles begin" on a fairing showing a man nursing a crying baby. Another shows a man cowering from his wife with the caption "Home from the club he fears the storm." Many, on the other hand, are simply charming, for example "God Save the Queen" (a family gathered round a piano) or "Which is prettiest?" (three beautiful little girls). Some captions are politically inspired, such as "English neutrality 1870 Attending the sick and the wounded", commemorating the fact that Britain did not become involved in the Franco-Prussian War of 1870. Others are moralistic e.g. "Seeing him home" showing a drunk being escorted home by a spirit and the grim reaper, both dressed as undertakers.

Occasionally fairings descend into the downright rude, such as "The early bird catches the worm", in which a goose pecks at what it thinks is a worm, only to cause pain to a young lad who is relieving himself. Another one is "Review" in which two lecherous men admire a scantily clad woman emerging from bathing.

== The seven categories ==
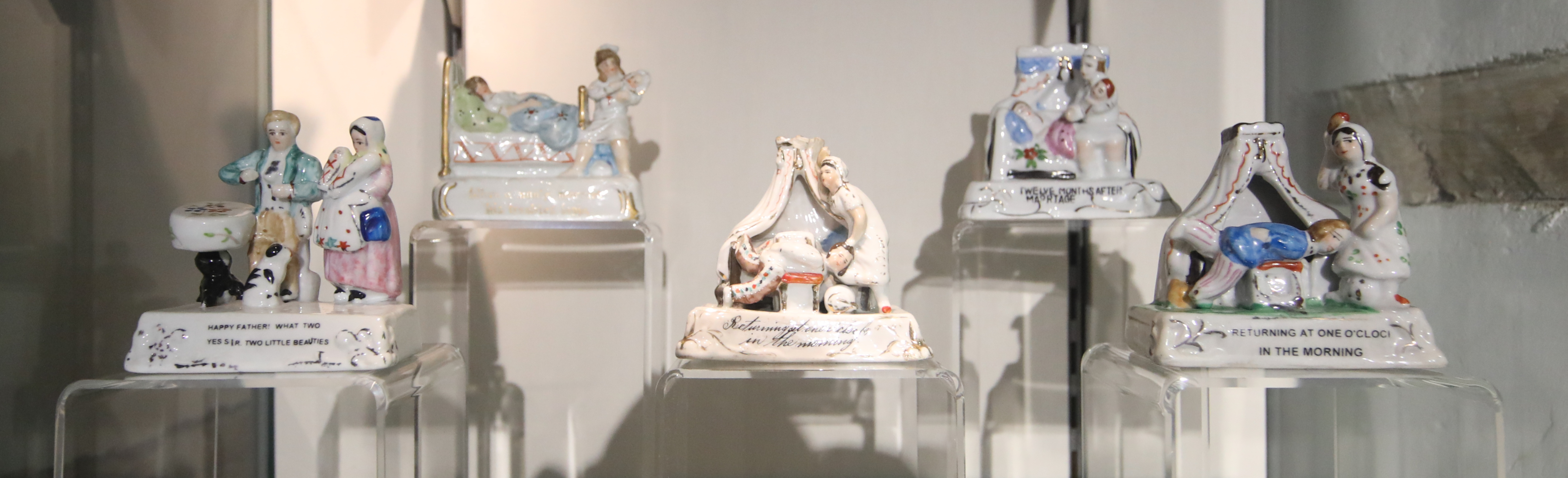
Part of the collection of china fairings held by Tudor House and Garden in Southampton

Authors generally classify fairings into seven categories based on their general value and rarity. Category A contains the most common fairings, and the categories go up through B, C, D, E, F and finally X for the rarest and most valuable fairings. Books on fairings sometimes assign price ranges to these categories, but these are relied on less and less as time goes by. After all, when fairings are traded the price agreed upon depends on how keenly each party wants the trade. The categories are still retained as a convenient way of classifying fairings but are no longer relied upon for setting prices.

== Dating ==
- Earlier fairings sometimes had the four digit numbers incised on the base, these will usually be found without Conta & Boehme's shield mark. The shield/dagger mark was not used before 1840-45 (as per Vogels book ISBN 0-9645241-1-2)
- Fairings from 1850-1860 were generally larger than those that followed.
- From the 1890s the shield mark may be printed or the "Made in Germany" mark could be present, but just to confuse you even further, no four digit impressed or incised numbers may be present. It is generally assumed that these are fakes but according to my research this is not necessarily the case.
- circa 1890 the shield was printed on base.
- after 1890 the colours of Conta & Boehme Fairings became brighter and much more colourful.
- 1891 made in Germany' was used as all ceramics had to indicate country of manufacture.
- 1914 fairings were not made.
- A bicycle indicates that a piece is later than 1867. Some fairings have themes based on popular music or prints, these may be dated easily.

Dating Non Conta & Boehme Fairings

- Most of the other manufactures, typically of inferior fairings, started circa 1890 onwards until 1914.
- Use dating methods that you would normally use to date non-fairings porcelain.
- Most 'modern' reproductions were produced mid/late-20th century.

== Reproductions ==
Reproductions were made as early as the first few decades of the twentieth century. However, serious fairing collectors are not interested in them, and in the United Kingdom they are generally only worth a few pounds at most.

It takes an experienced eye to tell a reproduction from the genuine article, but there are one or two tell-tale signs that you can use to spot the more obvious ones.

- Reproductions often have two small holes, roughly the size of a fingernail, on the underside.
- Many fairings have a four-digit number printed on their base, with each number defining a particular design. Any number starting with the digits "18" indicates a reproduction.
- Reproductions generally seem cheap and shoddy, with excessively gaudy colours and poor gilding if any. The caption may be printed in a sloppy fashion, such as sloping downwards in upper case letters.
- Although several captions are shared among different genuine fairings, and the same design often appears with different captions, there are a few captions, such as "Loose pins" that are not genuine.
- Some unscrupulous traders have been known to apply a patina of grime to a reproduction to make it appear older than it is.
