= Josiah Heyman =

American anthropologist

Josiah McC. Heyman
- Born: 1958 (age 67–68)
- Education: CUNY Graduate Center (Ph.D., 1988)
- Scientific career
- Fields: Anthropology
- Workplaces: University of Texas at El Paso
- Thesis: The working people of the United States-Mexico border in the region of the northeastern Sonora, 1886-1986 (1988)

Josiah McConnell Heyman (born 1958) is an American anthropologist and professor of anthropology at the University of Texas at El Paso, where he is also an Endowed Professor of Border Trade Issues and the director of the Center for Interamerican and Border Studies. He is known for his studies of the United States-Mexico border, which he has been studying for over 30 years. He has also researched the increasing extent to which the border has been enforced by the United States Border Patrol.

== Education ==
Bachelor of Arts in 1980 in anthropology from Johns Hopkins University and a Ph.D. in anthropology in 1988 from the Graduate Center of the City University of New York.
