= TruMark Financial Center =

Indoor athletic arena on La Salle University's campus

Coordinates: 40.039993°N 75.15654°W

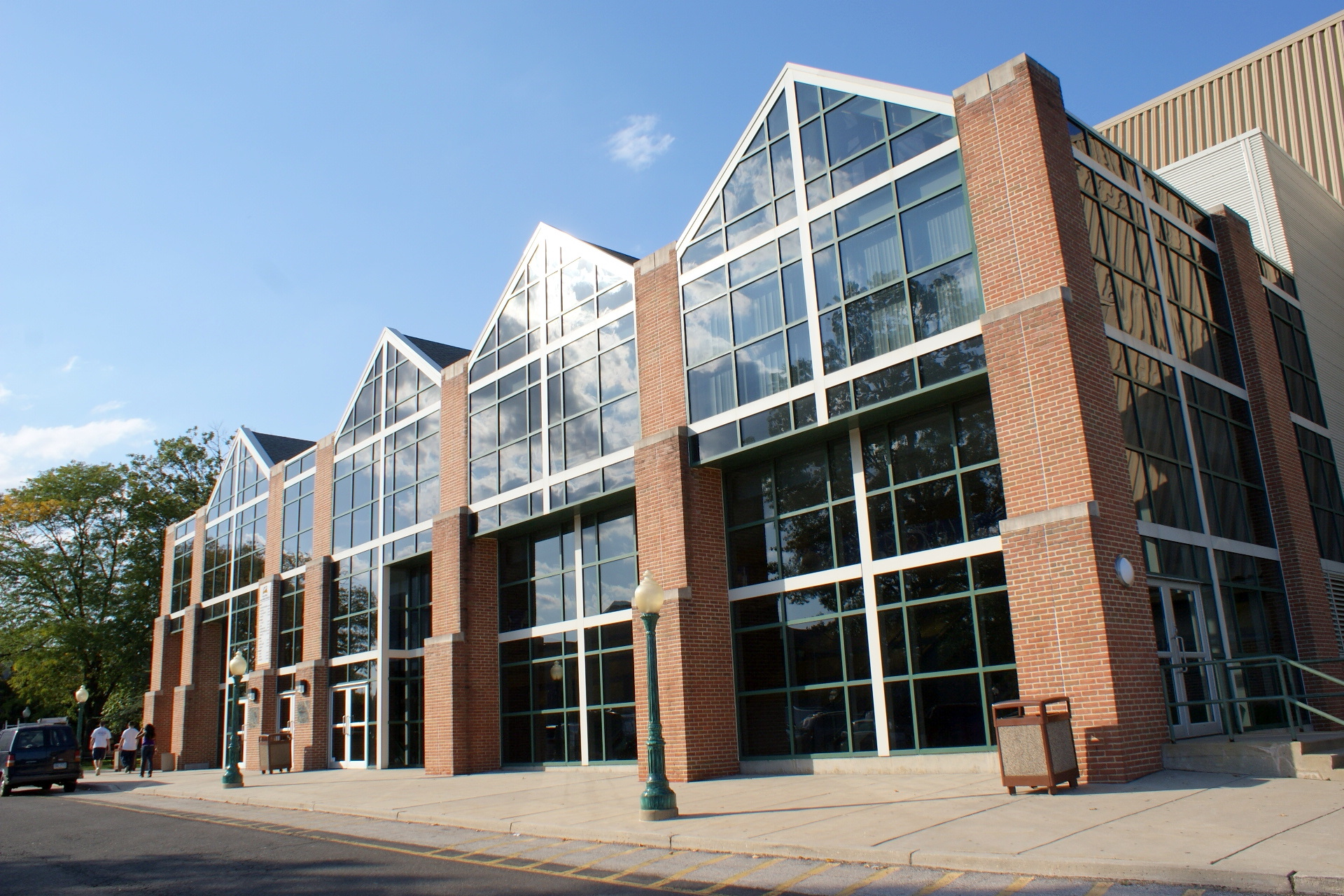
The Hayman Center.

The TruMark Financial Center, known as the Hayman Center until 2017, is the indoor athletic arena on La Salle University's campus. It is located directly across a walkway from the St. Francis and St. Edwards residence complex. The building was opened in February 1998 from a very large donation from Harry Blake Hayman I. The building was dedicated in the name of his parents; a plaque was placed on the front, inside beside the main doors.

Located on the first floor of the building is the main gameday concourse and the six-lane, 25-yard Kirk Pool. The TruMark Financial Center hosted the 2007 Philadelphia Catholic League and Public League swimming championships.

The second floor is home to the La Salle University Athletic Department and team offices. Also located on the second floor is the Mezzanine level, which overlooks the main entrance. It is only accessible from the main entrance.

The third-floor houses John Glaser Arena, the 3,000-seat basketball/volleyball/intramural sports facility. The third floor was the former location of Tom Gola Arena from 1998 till 2024.

Located in the basement are the team locker rooms, the equipment room, the training and weight rooms and a single squash court.

On Monday, April 24, 2017, it was announced that the Hayman Center would be renamed the TruMark Financial Center after its sponsor, one of the region's largest credit unions.

== Past events ==
- Bill Clinton
- Michelle Obama
- Cornel West
- Luis Antonio Tagle
- Chris Matthews
