= Juan Andrade Heymann =

Ecuadorian short story writer and playwright

Juan Andrade Heymann (Quito, December 18, 1945) is an Ecuadorian writer, novelist, short story writer, poet, and playwright.

His short story El lagarto en la mano (1965) and his novel Las tertulias de San Li Tun (1993) expressed social change.

== Works ==
| Detail | Year |
|---|---|
| Cuentos extraños | (1961) |
| Coros | (1964) |
| El lagarto en la mano | (1965) |
| Cuentos del día siguiente | (1972) |
| Teatro: La respuesta: El general de plomo. Campoverde | (1972) |
| Anécdotas de vuelta y media | (1973) |
| Acto | (1975) |
| La erección de San Fernandino | (1975) |
| Las nueve novelas no ejemplares de la señorita Hincapié | (1977) |
| Furores concretos: poemas | (1980) |
| Recuento de poemas | (1985) |
| Botswana Small Scale Foundry Project: A Report Prepared for Intermediate Technology Development Group Limited | (1985) |
| Sólo por esta noche: cuentos | (1985) |
| 26 años de vacaciones: antología | (1988) |
| Las tertulias de San Li Tun: novela | (1993) |
| Alerta roja: (novela corta, melodía larga) | (1995) |
| Cabaret Picasso | (2001) |
| El descubrimiento de Américo: (cuentos) | (2002) |
| Ultimo Amor: Novela | (2002) |
| Miscelâanea: panfletos atribuidos | (2008) |
| Memoria desmemoria y reinvención de Eros | (2009) |
| Trece novelas: que no son cuento y no son 13 | (2010) |
