= Hayman =

Name list

Hayman is both a surname and a given name. Notable people with the name include:

== Surname ==
- Al Hayman (1847–1917), business partner of Charles Frohman in Theatrical Syndicate
- Andy Hayman (born 1959), retired British police officer, author of The Terrorist Hunters
- Brett Hayman (born 1972), Australian rowing cox
- Carl Hayman (born 1979), international rugby union footballer
- Carole Hayman, English writer, broadcaster and journalist
- Connie Passalacqua Hayman, American journalist and educator
- Conway Hayman (1949–2020), American football player and coach
- Cyd Hayman (born 1944), English actress
- Damaris Hayman (1929–2021), actress best known for character roles on television
- Darren Hayman (born 1970), English singer-songwriter and guitarist
- David Hayman (born 1961) Scottish actor and director
- Dawn Hayman (born 1997), Australian bowls competitor
- Francis Hayman (1708–1776), English painter and illustrator, one of the founding members of the Royal Academy in 1768
- Harold Hayman (1894–1966), British Labour Party politician
- Helene Hayman, Baroness Hayman (born 1949), Lord Speaker of the House of Lords in the Parliament of the UK
- Henry Hayman (cricketer) (1853–1941), English cricketer
- Henry Hayman Toulmin (1807–1871), wealthy British ship owner, became Justice of the Peace and High Sheriff of Hertfordshire
- Horace Hayman Wilson (1786–1860), English orientalist
- James Hayman, American television producer, director and cinematographer
- Laure Hayman (1851–1940), French demimonde and sculptor
- Lew Hayman (1908–1984), American sports figure
- Lillian Hayman (1922–1994), Tony Award-winning African American actress and singer
- Margaret Hayman (1923–1994), British mathematics educator, wife of Walter
- Mathew Hayman (born 1978), Australian professional road bicycle racer
- Michael Hayman (born 1970), British public relations consultant
- Patrick Hayman (1915–1988), English artist
- Peter Hayman (diplomat) (1914–1992), British diplomat
- Peter Hayman (ornithologist) (1930–2025), British ornithologist and illustrator
- Richard Hayman (1920–2014), American arranger, harmonica player, and conductor
- Robert Hayman (1575–1629), poet, colonist and Proprietary Governor of Bristol's Hope colony in Newfoundland
- Robert Hayman-Joyce (born 1940), former Master-General of the Ordnance
- Rollo Hayman (1925–2008), Rhodesian politician
- Ron Hayman (born 1958), one of the first Canadian cyclists to turn professional in the late 1970s
- Ronald Hayman (1932–2019), British critic, dramatist, and writer best known for his biographies
- Ruth Hayman (died 1981), lawyer and anti-apartheid campaigner
- Samuel Hayman (1816–1886), Irish clergyman and antiquary
- Sue Hayman, British Labour Party politician, MP for Workington 2015–2019
- Thomas Hayman (1904–1962), New Zealand politician of the National Party
- Walter Hayman (1926–2020), British mathematician known for contributions to complex analysis, husband of Margaret
- William Hayman Cummings (1831–1915), English musician, tenor and organist at Waltham Abbey

== Given name ==
- Hayman Hayman-Joyce (1897–1958), British Army officer who commanded 4th Division during World War II
- Hayman Johnson (1912–1993), eminent Anglican priest in the twentieth century
- John Hayman Packer (1730–1806), actor for David Garrick's company at Drury Lane
- Hayman Rooke (1723–1806), became an antiquary on his retirement from the Army

== See also ==
- Hayman Center, the indoor athletic arena on La Salle University's campus
- Hayman drums, introduced in the late 1960s, being made by an English manufacturer
- Hayman Fire, forest fire that started 95 miles (153 km) southwest of Denver, Colorado
- Hayman Island, the most northerly of the Whitsunday Islands, off the coast of Central Queensland, Australia
- Hayman Nunataks, small group of isolated nunataks at the east end of the Grosvenor Mountains, Antarctica
- Darren Hayman & the Secondary Modern, British band
- Hayman's Dwarf Epauletted Fruit Bat (Micropteropus intermedius), a species of megabat in the family Pteropodidae
- Jeptha Hayman House, historic home located at Kingston, Somerset County, Maryland, United States
- Lew Hayman Trophy, Canadian Football League trophy
