= Hyman Martin =

Hyman "Pittsburgh Hymie" Martin (April 6, 1903 – July 12, 1987) was a Pittsburgh mobster and a close associate of Moe Dalitz and Louis Rothkopf. He was seen with Davis and Rothkopf hours before the murder of Cleveland city councilman William E. Potter on February 3, 1931. Identified by police as matching the description of the man who rented the apartment in which Potter's body was found, he was arrested in Pittsburgh shortly after, although he denied any knowledge of the murder, stating "I'm a gentleman, a rumrunner!".

Charged with Potter's murder, Martin was convicted; however, he later won a retrial and was acquitted.
