= Kadrun =

Indonesian political term

In Indonesian politics, the term kadrun is an Indonesian abbreviation of kadal gurun (desert lizard), a nickname addressed to people who are considered narrow-minded, especially those influenced by extremism and fundamentalism from the Middle East, to stigmatize those labelled as radical islamist. They are also stereotyped to wear cadar, thawb, pants that reveal their ankles (cingkrang), and grow their beard.

Since 13 September 2019, the trend for pronouncing kadrun has beaten the volume trend for mentioning similar animal-based political term of cebong (tadpole) for pro-Jokowi during the 2019 Indonesian presidential election, referring to Jokowi fondness of keeping tadpoles in the palace ground; and kampret (microbat) for pro-Prabowo during the 2019 Indonesian presidential election, coming from a play for Prabowo's coalition acronym of KMP (Indonesian: Koalisi Merah Putih, Red and White Coalition).

"Desert lizard" refers to the Uromastyx aegyptia, a type of lizard commonly found in the deserts of the Middle East
