= Carl Heymann =

German pianist (c. 1853–1922)

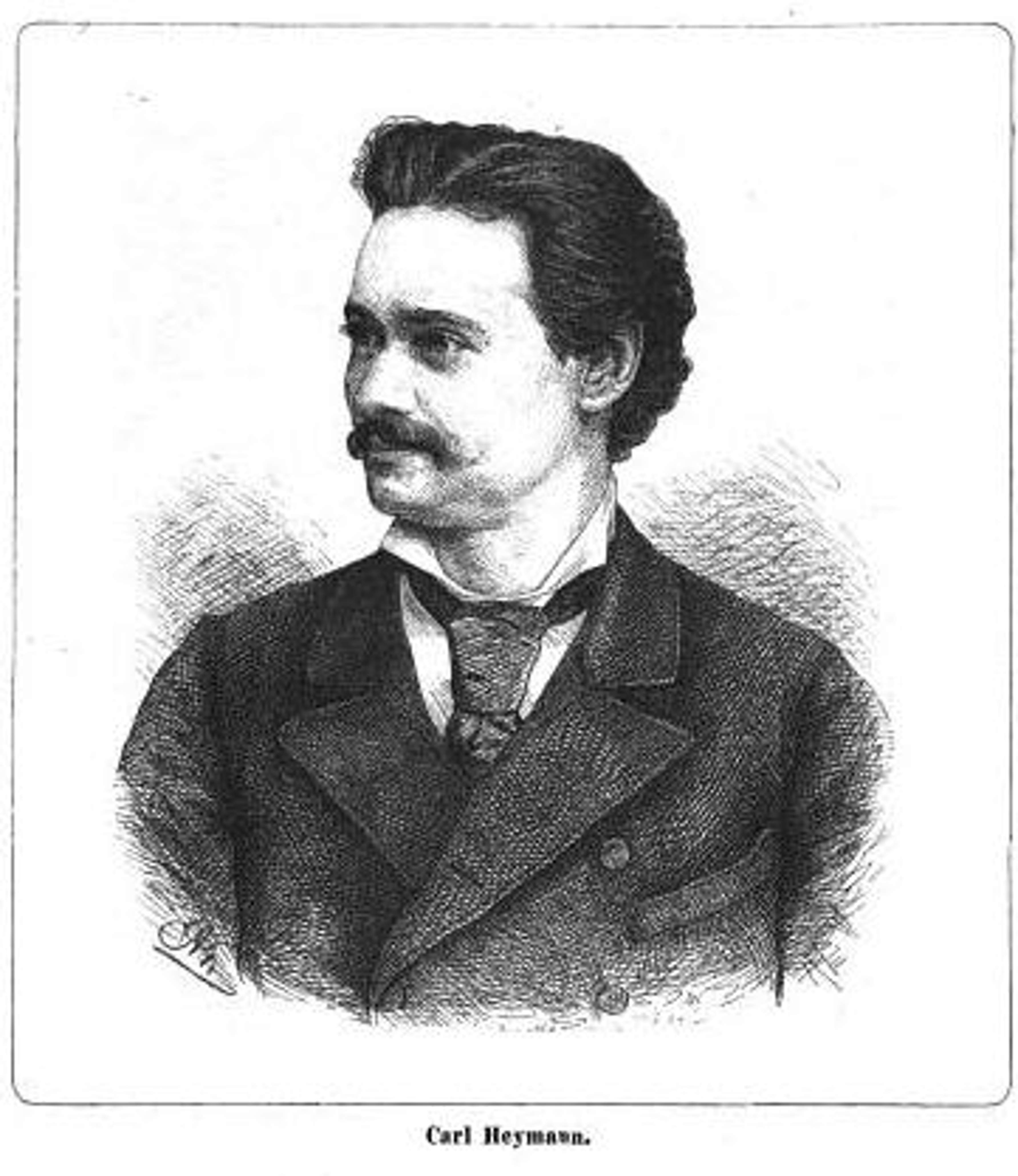
- Heymann in 1882
- Born: 1853; Filehne
- Died: 1922; Bingen
- Education: Cologne Conservatory
- Occupations: Pianist; Composer; Pedagogue
- Organizations: Hoch Conservatory

Carl Heymann (also Karl; 1853 in Filehne, (or Oct. 4, 1854 in Amsterdam) – 1922 in Bingen), was a virtuoso German pianist, composer and piano teacher.

== Life ==
Heymann studied at Cologne Conservatory with Ferdinand Hiller and upon his debut was called the "new Liszt" or the "second Rubinstein" by some experts. In spite of many interruptions to his early and fast rise to fame by psychological suffering, he was considered one of the most important pianists of his generation and was also known as a composer. He succeeded to Joseph Rubinstein in teaching at the Hoch Conservatory in Frankfurt am Main from 1879 to 1880. Following his period in Frankfurt, he returned to live in Bingen.

After the 1880s the name of the brilliant young Heymann's name disappeared from the musical world. He spent the last third of his life in an institution.

Heymann's repertoire included the virtuoso piano concertos of Ferdinand Ries, Johann Nepomuk Hummel, John Field, Moscheles, Reinecke, Chopin, Mendelssohn and Schumann.

Among his students in Frankfurt were the American pianist and composer Edward MacDowell whom he found to be so talented, that in 1880 he suggested, when illness forced him to resign, that MacDowell be his successor at the Hoch Conservatory, at the age of 19.

== Literature ==
- Peter Cahn: Das Hoch'sche Konservatorium in Frankfurt am Main (1878-1978), Frankfurt am Main: Kramer, 1979.
