= Andy Licht =

American film producer and public official (born 1957)

- Born: September 29, 1957 (age 69); Santa Monica, California, U.S.
- Education: University of California, Berkeley (A.B.); University of Southern California (M.F.A.)
- Occupations: Film producer; screenwriter; public official
- Years active: 1981-present
- Spouse: Lisa Licht (married 1991–present)
- Children: 3

Andy Licht

Commissioner, Beverly Hills Cultural Heritage Commission
- In office January 1, 2025 – December 31, 2026
- Appointed by: Beverly Hills City Council

Andrew Kevin Licht (born September 29, 1957), commonly known as Andy Licht, is an American film producer, screenwriter, and public official. He is best known for producing studio films including License to Drive (1988), Little Monsters (1989), The Cable Guy (1996), and Idle Hands (1999), and for serving as an executive producer on Waterworld (1995), which at the time of its release was the highest-budget film ever produced.

In addition to his work in the film industry, Licht has held multiple civic leadership roles in Beverly Hills, California, including as chair of the Planning Commission and the Traffic and Parking Commission. In January 2026, he announced his candidacy for Beverly Hills City Council in the June 2, 2026, election.

== Early life and education ==
Licht was born on September 29, 1957, in Santa Monica, California, and grew up in Beverly Hills, California in a Jewish family. His father, David G. Licht (October 16, 1924 – August 15, 2014), was born in St. Louis, Missouri, and raised in Philadelphia and New York City. He fought in World War II in the Battle of the Bulge before working as an entertainment attorney in Beverly Hills, California. His mother was Inge Licht.

Licht attended the elementary school at the Hawthorne School of the Beverly Hills Unified School District and graduated from Beverly Hills High School in 1975, where he played on the tennis team and served as an editor of the school's Watchtower yearbook.

Licht earned an A.B. in Economics from the University of California, Berkeley, graduating with honors. During the summer between his junior and senior years, he worked in New York's Financial District on Wall Street. After completing his undergraduate studies, he applied to the USC School of Cinematic Arts' Peter Stark Producing Program at the recommendation of his mother, who had learned about the new film program before its first year. He graduated with a Master of Fine Arts in 1981, earning cum laude honors.

== Career ==
In 1981, during his final semester at the USC School of Cinematic Arts, Licht and fellow student Jeffrey Mueller wrote a business plan to bring young writers and directors to Hollywood studios. They shared the plan with professor Stanley Kamen, known for his role as an agent at William Morris Agency, who set them up with meetings at several film studios. One such meeting was with Frank Wells, then vice chairman of Warner Bros., who gave the pair a producing deal.

On July 8, 1988, Licht and Mueller, whose Licht/Mueller Film Corporation banner was then under a first-look producing agreement with Davis Entertainment, released their first feature film, License to Drive. Produced alongside John Davis, the film had a budget of $8.5 million and was distributed by 20th Century Fox. It went on to gross $22.4 million domestically.

Later that year, on September 16, 1988, Cannon Film Distributors released Doin' Time on Planet Earth, co-written by Licht and Mueller alongside Darren Star. Licht and Mueller helped Star develop a treatment for the film and sell it to Warner Bros. The film was Star's first produced project.

In August 1989, Licht and Mueller produced the fantasy-comedy film Little Monsters, alongside Davis Entertainment and Vestron Pictures. The pair met with writers Terry Rossio and Ted Elliott to hear several pitches before selecting the screenplay that became the film. During development, Licht and Mueller envisioned Fred Savage to play the lead role, following his recent appearances in The Princess Bride and The Wonder Years, and cast him alongside his brother Ben Savage to play Brian Stevenson and his younger brother, Eric.

Licht and Mueller began developing the action film Waterworld in late 1988, which was eventually released in 1995. The screenplay was brought to the producers by their assistant, who was a friend of the screenwriter Peter Rader. Rader agreed to allow Licht and Mueller to produce the film on the condition that they help him secure an agent. By December 23, 1988, several months after the 1988 Writers Guild of America strike, Licht and Mueller had partnered with Davis Entertainment. They began submitting the script to studios, initially budgeting the project at approximately $30–37 million. They also arranged meetings between Rader and several agents, and he ultimately signed with Ken Stovitz at International Creative Management. Largo Pictures, headed by Lawrence Gordon, acquired the script, and Licht and Mueller collaborated with director Nils Gaup to refine the production budget. Kevin Costner and director Kevin Reynolds later joined the project. As production progressed, Creative Artists Agency and Universal Pictures assumed greater control, and Licht received executive producer credit along with a negotiated compensation package. At the time of its release, Waterworld was the highest-budget film ever produced, with a reported cost of over $172 million.

Licht and Mueller began production on The Cable Guy on December 4, 1995, several months after Waterworld came out in theaters. The producers pitched the film as a $3–5 million independent comedy, originally attaching Chris Farley on the project to play the lead role. The project was bought by Mark Canton, then chairman at Columbia Pictures. Due to Farley's availability, Jim Carrey was cast to play the lead role. The initial budget rose to $8.5 million, and after Carrey was cast for $20 million, it rose again to approximately $40 million. In 1996, the film debuted at No. 1 at the domestic box office, earning $20.5 million in its opening weekend.

As early as 1996, Licht and Mueller were attached to produce a mixed live action and animated film written by Neil Tolkin, originally titled Rupert and Murdoch. The project moved from TriStar Pictures to 20th Century Fox, and Ron Bass was later brought on to revise the screenplay. The film was ultimately not produced.

In March 1997, screenwriters Terri Hughes and Ron Milbauer sold their comedy horror film Idle Hands to TriStar Pictures, with Licht and Mueller as producers. The film was released on April 30, 1999.

In April 1997, Licht was named a Rising Star in Vanity Fair alongside Russel Simmons, Baz Luhrmann, among others.

In the 2000s, Licht served as an executive producer for Spinning Boris (2003) and Inkheart (2008).

In 2017, Licht was attached as a producer on a planned adaptation of The 100-Year-Old Man Who Climbed Out the Window and Disappeared, based on the 2012 novel by Swedish author Jonas Jonasson. The project was set up at CBS Films, with Will Ferrell attached to star in the film. As of March 2026, the film had not moved into production.

== Public service ==
Licht has been active in public service in Beverly Hills, California, beginning as a member of the Beverly Hills Unified School District Citizens' Bond Oversight Committee, Superintendent's Advisory Council, and El Rodeo Site Council.

In 2010, Licht joined the Beverly Hills Traffic and Parking Commission. He was elected vice chair in 2013 and chair in 2014 by unanimous vote. In 2013, Licht served as a member of the Metro Purple Line Section 1 Advisory Group. In October 2013, he was appointed by Mayor Mirisch to the Santa Monica Boulevard Blue Ribbon Committee, a 15-person panel tasked with advising the Beverly Hills City Council on the Boulevard's reconstruction project.

Licht was appointed to the Beverly Hills Planning Commission in July 2016, later serving as chair in 2018 and being reappointed in 2021. Licht ran for Beverly Hills City Council in 2022. In January 2025, he began serving on the Beverly Hills Cultural Heritage Commission.

In January 2026, Licht announced his candidacy for Beverly Hills City Council in the June 2026 election, which will fill three vacant seats.

== Filmography ==
=== Feature films and TV movies ===
Year	Title	Producer	Executive Producer	Writer
1988	License to Drive	Yes	No	No
1988	Doin' Time on Planet Earth	No	No	Yes
1989	Little Monsters	Yes	No	No
1995	Waterworld	No	Yes	No
1996	The Cable Guy	Yes	No	No
1998	Breakfast with Einstein (TV Movie)	No	Yes	No
1999	Idle Hands	Yes	No	No
2003	Spinning Boris	No	Yes	No
2008	Inkheart	No	Yes	No
2018	Cooking with Love (TV Movie)	No	Yes	No
TBA	The 100-Year-Old Man Who Climbed Out the Window and Disappeared	Yes	No	No

== Personal life and philanthropy ==
Licht is married to Lisa Licht, who served as chief marketing officer of U.S. Concerts at Live Nation Entertainment and held executive roles at Yahoo!, Hasbro, and 20th Century Fox. They married in 1991 and have three children.

In January 2015, the Licht family contributed to the installation of a new sound system at Beverly Hills High School’s Swim Gym. In 2019, they were recognized at Temple Emanuel of Beverly Hills’ annual Beverly Hills Ball for their contributions to the community and the synagogue.

Licht has participated in philanthropic activities including volunteering and organizing fundraisers for organizations such as the United Jewish Fund, Big Brothers Big Sisters, and Boys & Girls Clubs of America. He is a lifetime member of the Academy of Motion Picture Arts and Sciences, and has previously served as adjunct faculty for the Peter Stark Program at the USC School of Cinematic Arts.
