= Dick Tracewski =

American baseball player and coach (born 1935)

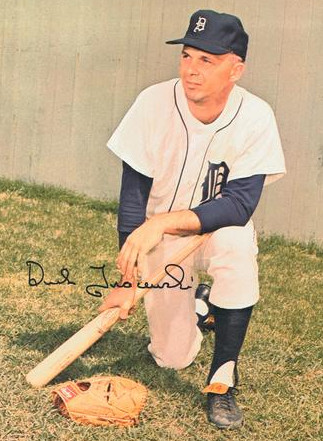
- Tracewski in 1966
- Infielder
- Born: February 3, 1935 (age 91); Eynon, Pennsylvania, U.S.
- Batted: Right Threw: Right

MLB debut
- April 12, 1962, for the Los Angeles Dodgers

Last MLB appearance
- September 27, 1969, for the Detroit Tigers

MLB statistics
- Batting average: .213
- Home runs: 8
- Runs batted in: 91
- Stats at Baseball Reference

Teams
- As player: Los Angeles Dodgers (1962–1965); Detroit Tigers (1966–1969); As coach: Detroit Tigers (1972–1995); As manager: Detroit Tigers (1979, 1989)

Career highlights and awards
- 4× World Series champion (1963, 1965, 1968, 1984)

Richard Joseph Tracewski (born February 3, 1935), nicknamed "Trixie", is an American former baseball player, coach, and manager. During his playing career, he was an infielder for the Los Angeles Dodgers and Detroit Tigers of Major League Baseball, appearing in 614 games over eight seasons, from 1962 to 1969.

Tracewski was a four-time World Series champion as a player and coach. He participated in three Fall Classics as a player: two with Los Angeles (1963, 1965) and one with Detroit (1968). He was the starting second baseman in the Dodgers' four-game sweep of the Yankees in 1963, and also started four games at second during the seven-game 1965 classic. He also served as first-base coach for the Tigers in the 1984 World Series.

== Early life ==
Tracewski was born in Eynon, Pennsylvania to Polish immigrant parents, the youngest of four children. He attended Archbald High School where he was a star athlete.

After his high school graduation in 1953, Tracewski was signed by the Brooklyn Dodgers organization. He spent six years in the minor leagues and it took him almost a decade to reach the majors. Tracewski also performed two years of military service during this period (1958-59); along with other baseball players, he was posted at Fort McPherson in Atlanta, Georgia.

== Baseball career ==
=== Los Angeles Dodgers ===
Tracewski made his major league debut as a pinch-runner, on April 12, 1962. His debut coincided with the first ever series played at the newly-opened Dodger Stadium. After early and late-season trials with the 1962 Dodgers, Tracewski earned a spot as a utility infielder, getting into more than 100 games in both 1963 and 1964.

In the 1963 World Series, Tracewski started at second base after regular third baseman Ken McMullen was injured during the final days of the season and Jim Gilliam was moved to third. He played all four games in the four-game sweep of the New York Yankees.

Tracewski was on the field on August 22, 1965, when Juan Marichal of the San Francisco Giants struck Dodgers catcher John Roseboro on the head with a baseball bat, resulting in a 14-minute brawl. A few weeks later, on September 9, 1965, he was the second baseman when Sandy Koufax completed his perfect game against the Chicago Cubs, having replaced Jim Lefebvre at the start of the ninth inning.

In the 1965 World Series against the Minnesota Twins, Tracewski appeared in six of the seven games. In Game 2, he pinch-hit for pitcher Bob Miller. He replaced second baseman Jim Lefebvre who was injured during Game 3 and subsequently started in Games 4 to 7.

=== Detroit Tigers ===
After the 1965 season, Tracewski was traded to the Detroit Tigers for pitcher Phil Regan. He was initially disappointed and frustrated with the trade as he realized his playing time would be limited. However, he later referred to it as best thing that ever happened to him and he spent the rest of his career in the Detroit organization.

In 1968, Tracewski appeared in 90 games for the pennant-winning Tigers. He won his third World Series when the Tigers defeated the St. Louis Cardinals in seven games in the 1968 World Series. Tracewski appeared in Game 1 as a third baseman, replacing Don Wert who had been pinch-hit for, and then as a pinch-runner for Willie Horton in Game 7, scoring a run in the ninth inning.

When his playing career ended, after the 1969 season, Tracewski became a manager in the Detroit farm system for two seasons (1970–71). In 1972, he began a 24-year stint as a coach for the Tigers, longer than any other coach in the history of the team.

On two major occasions, Tracewski filled in as the Tigers' interim manager. He managed the club for two games in 1979 (with the Tigers winning both) before Sparky Anderson arrived, and for 17 contests between May 20 to June 4, 1989, while Anderson recovered from exhaustion. He posted a 9–8 record during this second emergency assignment.

He retired from baseball after the 1995 season, along with Anderson.

=== Career overall ===
During his eight-year major league career, Tracewski batted .213, with eight home runs and 91 RBIs. His 262 hits (in 1,231 at bats) also included 31 doubles and nine triples. He played 205 games as a shortstop, 202 games as a second baseman, and 115 games as a third baseman. Overall, he had a fielding percentage of .958 in 769 chances.

Category	G	BA	AB	R	H	2B	3B	HR	RBI	SB	CS	BB	SO	OBP	SLG	OPS	PO	A	DP	E	FLD%	Ref.
Total	614	.213	1,231	148	262	31	9	8	90	15	14	134	253	.289	.272	.562	255	482	89	32	.958	

== Later life ==
Tracewski lives near Scranton, Pennsylvania with his wife Delores, whom he married in 1963. The couple have a daughter, Joy Ann, and two grandchildren.

He is one of the seven principle subjects of author Michael Leahy's award-winning book, The Last Innocents: The Collision of the Turbulent Sixties and the Los Angeles Dodgers. The book examines the social and political changes of the 1960s through the eyes of its principle subjects.

Sporting positions
Preceded by Frank Skaff; Ed Brinkman	Detroit Tigers first base coach 1972–1978; 1980–1991	Succeeded by Ed Brinkman; Gene Roof
Preceded by Fred Hatfield; Alex Grammas	Detroit Tigers third base coach 1979; 1992–1995	Succeeded by Alex Grammas; Terry Francona
