= Rick Ducommun =

Canadian actor (1952–2015)

- Born: Richard Ducommun; July 3, 1952; Prince Albert, Saskatchewan, Canada
- Died: June 12, 2015 (aged 62); Vancouver, British Columbia, Canada
- Occupations: Actor; comedian
- Years active: 1980–2004
- Spouse: Leslie Ann McNulty
- Children: 4

Richard Ducommun (July 3, 1952 – June 12, 2015) was a Canadian actor and comedian known for his supporting turns in various films, most prominently The 'Burbs (1989) and Groundhog Day (1993).

== Career ==
One of his earliest television appearances was on Star Search and as a technician accosted by a scantily clad dancer near the end of the music video for O'Bryan's song "Lovelite", both in 1984. He finished second in the comedy category behind Brad Garrett. His credits include Bart (half of Biff and Bart) in the Canadian children's TV series Zig Zag, Rick Dukeman in the music video show Rock 'N' America, Tom Hanks' neighbor Art Weingartner in The 'Burbs (1989), the villainous monster "Snik" in the Fred Savage fantasy Little Monsters (1989), a barfly in the Bill Murray comedy Groundhog Day (1993), and Henry the chauffeur in Blank Check (1994).

Ducommun acted in other films, such as No Small Affair (1984), A Fine Mess (1986), Spaceballs (1987), Die Hard (1988), The Experts (1989), The Hunt for Red October (1990), Gremlins 2: The New Batch (1990), The Last Boy Scout (1991), Class Act (1992), Encino Man (1992), Last Action Hero (1993), Jury Duty (1995), Scary Movie (2000) and MVP: Most Valuable Primate (2000).

Ducommun died in Vancouver on June 12, 2015 of complications from diabetes. He was 62.

After his death, Ducommun was credited to be co-founder of Canadian skateboards company Skull Skates, alongside his brother Peter.

== Filmography ==
- Rock 'N' America (1984) – Host
- No Small Affair (1984) – Groom
- A Fine Mess (1986) – Wardell
- Spaceballs (1987) – Prison Guard
- Die Hard (1988) – Walt, City Worker
- The Experts (1989) – Sparks
- The 'Burbs (1989) – Art Weingartner
- Little Monsters (1989) – Snik
- The Hunt for Red October (1990) – Navigator C-2A
- The Earth Day Special (1990) – Hospital Security Guard
- Gremlins 2: The New Batch (1990) – Clamp Center Security Guard
- The Last Boy Scout (1991) – Pool Owner
- Encino Man (1992) – Mr. Brush
- Class Act (1992) – Parole Officer Reichert
- Loaded Weapon 1 (1993) – District Attorney
- Groundhog Day (1993) – Gus
- Last Action Hero (1993) – Tom Noonan's Agent
- Ghost in the Machine (1993) – Phil Stewart
- Blank Check (1994) – Henry
- Jury Duty (1995) – The Real Frank (uncredited)
- Dogmatic (1999) – George
- Final Voyage (1999) – Jasper
- Scary Movie (2000) – Neil Campbell
- Ready to Run (2000) – Cyclone (voice)
- MVP: Most Valuable Primate (2000) – Coach Marlowe
- Harvard Man (2001) – Police Officer Martino (uncredited)
- Like Mike (2002) – Dad Outside Arena
- Pauly Shore Is Dead (2003) – Mitch Rosenberg
- Back by Midnight (2004) – Wilson
- Funky Monkey (2004) – Father Rick (final film role)
