= License to Drive =

1988 film by Greg Beeman

- Theatrical release poster
- Directed by: Greg Beeman
- Written by: Neil Tolkin
- Produced by: Jeffrey A. Mueller; Andrew Licht
- Starring: Corey Haim; Corey Feldman; Carol Kane; Richard Masur
- Cinematography: Bruce Surtees
- Edited by: Wendy Greene Bricmont; Stephen Semel
- Music by: Jay Ferguson
- Production company: Davis Entertainment
- Distributed by: 20th Century Fox
- Release date: July 6, 1988 (United States)
- Running time: 90 minutes
- Country: United States
- Language: English
- Budget: $8.5 million
- Box office: $22.4 million (United States)

License to Drive is a 1988 American teen comedy film written by Neil Tolkin and directed by Greg Beeman in his feature film directorial debut. It stars Corey Haim, Corey Feldman, Heather Graham, and Carol Kane. The film was in production in November 1987. It was released on July 6, 1988, in the United States and grossed over $20 million at the North American box office. It was distributed by 20th Century Fox.

== Plot ==
"Elmdale, California" teenager Les Anderson tries to get his driver's license to impress his crush, beautiful Mercedes Lane. He fails the knowledge portion of the exam but inadvertently causes a computer surge.

Les's failing marks are thought to be irretrievable, but the Department of Motor Vehicles lets him pass the exam after comparing him to his twin sister's high marks. He eventually passes the road test, but his real test scores are finally retrieved and his license is revoked.

Les tries concealing the truth from his parents, but his mother finds out and his father grounds him for two weeks. Les had previously made plans to drive his grandfather's prized 1972 Cadillac Sedan de Ville and decides to sneak away anyway for a joyride with Mercedes.

Mercedes gets drunk, and she and Les accidentally cave in the hood of the car after dancing on it. She passes out; Les panics and goes to his best friend Dean's house to have him pound out the dent in the car's hood.

Dean persuades Les to continue the joyride along with their friend Charles, but are unaware that Les does not have his license. The three put Mercedes in the trunk of the car and continue their night on the town, causing even more damage to the Cadillac. Meanwhile, Mrs. Anderson wakes up her husband late in the night announcing she is in labor.

The next day, Les drops off Charles and Dean at their homes. Mercedes wakes up and believes that the night prior was a dream. Les drops her off at her house, where they share a kiss. Les gets in trouble with his father Robert after returning home with the damaged Cadillac.

Mrs. Anderson insists that Robert hold her hand on the way to the hospital, forcing Les to drive. They make it in time, driving backwards part of the way when the transmission gets stuck in reverse. Robert forgives Les, saying they'll have the car repaired before his grandfather returns. The car is then crushed by a malfunctioning construction crane.

Sometime later, Mrs. Anderson has given birth twin babies. The family tries to explain the state of the Cadillac to Les's grandfather, but he laughs it off as he reveals he has severely damaged his son's own BMW in an accident. Robert gives the BMW keys to Les and jokingly tells him to take good care of it.

Mercedes pulls up in a white Volkswagen Golf Cabriolet to pick up Les. He gets in her car and they drive away.

== Cast ==
- Corey Haim as Les Anderson
- Corey Feldman as Dean
- Carol Kane as Mrs. Anderson
- Richard Masur as Mr. Robert Anderson
- Heather Graham as Mercedes Lane
- Michael Manasseri as Charles
- Parley Baer as Grandpa
- Michael A. Nickles as Paolo
- Nina Siemaszko as Natalie Anderson
- James Avery as Les's DMV Examiner
- Grant Goodeve as Natalie's DMV Examiner
- Grant Heslov as Karl
- Michael Ensign as School Teacher/Bus Driver
- Helen Hanft as Miss Hellberg
- Christopher Burton as Rudy

== Production ==
The film was based on a short story, published in 1986, in National Lampoon by Neil Tolkin. The working title was To Live and Drive in L.A..

Locations included: Westwood, Los Angeles, Walter Reed Middle School in North Hollywood, Los Angeles; Johnie's Broiler in Downey, California; and Terminal Island in Los Angeles.

== Reception ==
=== Box office ===
It earned $22,433,275 at the North American box office, against a production budget of $8.5 million.

=== Critical response ===
License to Drive received generally negative reviews from critics. On Rotten Tomatoes, it has a 24% approval rating based on 25 reviews, with an average score of 4/10. The site's critics consensus reads, "Despite a hard-working cast and a premise that will appeal to its teenage target demographic, this deeply silly comedy only has a License to Drive audiences to seek out better films." On Metacritic, the film had an average score of 36 out of 100 based on 9 critics, indicating "generally unfavorable" reviews.

Chicago Sun-Times critic Roger Ebert gave the film two and a half out of four stars and described the film as "more-than-passable summer entertainment, especially when it identifies with the yearnings of its young heroes to get behind the wheel." He said the first half of the film was "very funny" but the second half was "much more predictable".

== Music ==
Track listing

1. "Drive My Car" by Breakfast Club – 3:13
2. "Sweet Surrender" by Brenda K. Starr – 4:50
3. "I Feel Free" (extended version) by Belinda Carlisle – 6:55
4. "Time Starts Now" by Boys Club – 4:28
5. "Get Outta My Dreams, Get into My Car" by Billy Ocean – 4:43
6. "Crucial" by New Edition – 4:30
7. "One More Dance" by Jonathan Butler – 4:32
8. "Jazzy's in the House" by DJ Jazzy Jeff & The Fresh Prince – 2:55
9. "Touch and Go" by Femme Fatale – 3:57
10. "Make Some Noise" by Slave Raider – 3:28

Songs played in the film, but not on the soundtrack

1. "Mercedes Boy" by Pebbles – 3:54 (single remix)
2. "Rush Hour" by Jane Wiedlin – 4:03
3. "Strangers in the Night" by Frank Sinatra
4. "That's Life" by Frank Sinatra
5. "Saturday Night (Is the Loneliest Night of the Week)", by Jerry Wright
6. "Waiting for the Big One" by Femme Fatale
7. "Trouble" by Nia Peeples

== Home media ==
License to Drive was first released on VHS by CBS/Fox Video in December 1988. It was notable that some VHS versions of the film replaced the Nia Peeples song "Trouble" with "New Sensation" by INXS.

A special edition DVD was distributed by Anchor Bay Entertainment in the United States in May 2005. Special features included interviews with Corey Haim and Corey Feldman, audio commentary with Greg Beeman and Neil Tolkin, deleted scenes, TV spots, theatrical trailers, and the film's screenplay (DVD-ROM).

In January 2012, Anchor Bay released the film on Blu-ray.

== Unmade sequel and trilogy ==
In an interview on Larry King Live, on March 10, 2010, the day of Corey Haim's death, Corey Feldman claimed that he and Haim had been developing a sequel, titled License to Fly, an idea initiated by Haim. Feldman also claimed that there were tentative plans for a trilogy, with a third installment called License to Dive.

== Reboot ==
As of 2017, Fox Studios and Davis Entertainment were developing a female-driven reboot based on the film.

== See also ==
- List of American films of 1988
