= Jury Duty (film) =

- Promotional poster
- Directed by: John Fortenberry
- Screenplay by: Neil Tolkin; Barbara Williams; Samantha Adams
- Story by: Barbara Williams; Samantha Adams
- Produced by: Yoram Ben-Ami; Peter M. Lenkov
- Starring: Pauly Shore; Tia Carrere; Brian Doyle-Murray; Stanley Tucci; Abe Vigoda; Charles Napier; Shelley Winters
- Cinematography: Avi Karpick
- Edited by: Stephen Semel
- Music by: David Kitay
- Production company: Triumph Films
- Distributed by: TriStar Pictures
- Release date: April 12, 1995
- Running time: 88 minutes
- Country: United States
- Language: English
- Budget: $21 million
- Box office: $17 million

Jury Duty is a 1995 American legal comedy film directed by John Fortenberry, written by Neil Tolkin, Barbara Williams and Adam Small (credited as Samantha Adams), and starring Pauly Shore, Tia Carrere, Stanley Tucci, Brian Doyle-Murray, Shelley Winters and Abe Vigoda.

The film was actress Billie Bird's last screen appearance. The film received negative reviews, and was a box-office bomb.

== Plot ==
Tommy Collins is an unemployed erotic dancer living at his mother's home in a trailer park while he looks for a decent job. He finds out that his mother, and her boyfriend Jed, a polystyrene collector, are going to Las Vegas to be married and taking the mobile home with them. Although his mother had arranged for Tommy to stay with the Woodalls, he considers them awful people and decides to look for other living arrangements for him and his chihuahua Peanut (who loves the game show Jeopardy!).

Tommy rummages through the trash and finds his letter for jury duty that he had thrown away and decides to go. Each of the jurors get their own free accommodation plus $5 a day. After several cases, he gets chosen to be a juror for a murder case involving a man named Carl Wayne Bishop, a fast-food employee who had been fired and is now accused of murdering several other fast-food employees. The evidence against him gets stronger when several employees appear as witnesses saying that he threatened to kill them.

All the jurors are staying at the Holiday Suite in a section that is being remodeled. Tommy seems to be enjoying himself, until he finds he is sharing his room with his former high school principal Beasely, who puts motivational tapes on at night to full blast. He makes a deal with Russell Cadbury, the manager of the hotel, who says that he will get a different room if he advertises their business during news broadcasts. Tommy agrees and ends up staying in a luxurious suite.

Finally, the jurors go to the jury room for deliberation and appoint Tommy as their foreman. The other jurors immediately think that Bishop is guilty and want to vote straight away. Not wanting to lose his suite and luxurious lifestyle, Tommy votes not guilty and stalls and prolongs the deliberations as well as continuously going over the evidence. After many delays, the other jurors become increasingly angry with Tommy, especially Monica Lewis, whom Tommy had fallen in love with, and threaten to throw him out of the jury unless he finds a better way to prove Bishop's innocence.

After reading up on the law and further investigating, both of which are activities prohibited under standard instructions to jurors, Tommy finds some evidence after seeing a picture of Bishop on the window of a store, finally convincing the jurors that Bishop is not guilty; they celebrate. Unfortunately, later on, Monica finds Peanut and follows him up to Tommy's luxury suite, with security guard Murphy following her. Even though Tommy tries to explain that he is now a changed person, she is deeply upset with how he used them and walks out in tears.

Later, Judge Edward J. Powell declares a mistrial and arranges another hearing at a later date. Back at the trailer park, Tommy goes mining for polystyrene with Jed at the city dump. After seeing many polystyrene containers with fast food logos on them, Tommy realizes that the murderer was an environmentalist. He calls Monica, who immediately hangs up on him, but he goes looking for Frank, another fellow juror, who was also obsessed with the environment. Later that night, someone meets another man named Frank who thanks him for volunteering to do jury duty on his behalf while he was on vacation, only to be killed with a stun gun. The killer is revealed to be Frank, the man Tommy was seeking. Tommy arrives at the same house and relays his new evidence to Frank, asking him to help find Monica at the library she works at in order to convince her that his evidence is genuine.

When they arrive at the library, Frank reveals to Tommy and Monica that he was the killer. He ties them up and attempts to stab them with a sharp jagged knife. He tells them that he committed the terrible murders and framed Bishop because he thought there was no truth and justice in the world. With Peanut's help, however, they manage to subdue Frank and knock him unconscious. Tommy is given a check for his contribution to the case and Monica starts dating Tommy. He uses his earnings from erotic dancing towards law school and eventually becomes an attorney. Meanwhile, Peanut is shown accomplishing his lifelong dream of becoming a contestant on Jeopardy!.

== Cast ==
- Pauly Shore as Thomas B. "Tommy" Collins
- Tia Carrere as Monica Lewis
- Stanley Tucci as Frank / Billy
- Brian Doyle-Murray as Harry
- Abe Vigoda as Judge Edward J. Powell
- Charles Napier as Jed
- Richard Edson as Skeets
- Richard Riehle as Principal Beasley
- Alex Datcher as Sarah
- Richard T. Jones as Nathan
- Sharon Barr as Libby Starling
- Jack McGee as Murphy
- Nick Bakay as Richard Hurtz
- Ernie Lee Banks as Ray
- Shelley Winters as Mrs. Collins
- Sean Whalen as Carl Wayne Bishop
- Dick Vitale as Hal Gibson
- Billie Bird as Rose
- Jorge Luis Abreu as Jorge
- Siobhan Fallon as Heather
- Gregory Cooke as Reece Fishburne
- Mark L. Taylor as Russell Cadbury
- William Newman as Judge D'Angelo
- Lynn Ziegler as Mrs. Woodall
- Jay Kogen as Assistant
- Saemi Nakamura as Wiener Boy Employee
- Efren Ramirez as Pirate Pete's Employee
- Spike Feresten as Singer
- Rick Ducommun as The Real Frank (uncredited)
- Andrew Dice Clay as Uncle Sal (uncredited)

== Production ==
The film is loosely based on the teleplay Twelve Angry Men, which itself was adapted into film in 1957 starring Henry Fonda.

== Critical reception ==
At review aggregation site Rotten Tomatoes, the film received an approval rating of 0%, based on 14 reviews with an average score of 2.9/10, as of November 25, 2023.

Critic Leonard Maltin gave it a "BOMB" rating in his book Movie and Video Guide, but suggested even that rating "may be too high". Critic Roger Ebert said, on At the Movies, that Pauly Shore was the "cinematic equivalent of long fingernails, drawn very slowly and quite loudly over a gigantic blackboard" and noted that although his co-host, Gene Siskel, disliked Chris Farley, he would "rather attend a dusk-to-dawn Chris Farley film festival than sit through any 5 minutes of Jury Duty". Siskel agreed, referring to Shore as "aggravating". Ebert estimated that Shore's "appeal must be limited to people whose self-esteem and social skills are so damaged that they find humor, or at least relief, in at last encountering a movie character less successful than themselves".

Pauly Shore "won" a Golden Raspberry Award for Worst Actor at the 16th Golden Raspberry Awards. The film itself was nominated for Most Painfully Unfunny Comedy at the 1995 Stinkers Bad Movie Awards but lost to Ace Ventura: When Nature Calls.
