= Frazer Smith =

American actor

- Born: January 17, 1955 (age 71); Detroit, Michigan, United States
- Occupations: Comedian, actor, disc jockey

Frazer Smith, also known as Frazier Smith (born January 17, 1955), nicknamed "The Fraze", is an American radio personality, actor and stand-up comedian.

Smith was born in Detroit, Michigan.

== Career ==
Smith worked in Los Angeles at KROQ-FM from 1976 through 1979, KLOS from 1979 through 1984, KMET 1984 through 1986, KLSX 1986 through 1997, KLOS in 1997, and KRTH in 2002. He has played small roles in films and television shows and was one of the announcers on the TBS music video show Night Tracks from 1986 to 1988 and 1989 to 1991.

The debut of his manic show on KROQ-FM coincided with that station's rise playing what was then-new new wave music. His extended improvisational comedy based on a mythical lothario/detective was also heard on the sporadically-produced Hollywood Nite Shift, which featured Phil Austin of The Firesign Theatre, as well as movie, TV actor and radio DJ, Michael C. Gwynne, who also ran the board and spun the records. There was never a script, contrary to popular reviews of the time. A 'topic' appeared spontaneously as the theme ran and announcer Laura Quinn got set to introduce 'the boys.'

For several years Smith, along with Peter "Crabman" Crabbe, made an annual tradition of offering an alternate audio commentary to television coverage of the famous Tournament of Roses Parade. Listeners would be told to tune in to Los Angeles television station KTLA, which was hosted by Stephanie Edwards and Bob Eubanks. Smith would tell viewers to turn down the television volume and turn up the radio to hear the comedy parody, which included discussing news themes from the past year and applying them to the floats. For example, the year of the O. J. Simpson slow-speed car chase, one of the floats was described as a reenactment of the event. Smith and Crabbe would also describe the passing bands while playing continuous looped marching band music.

Smith is noted for his KROQ-FM simulcasts of the 1978 World Series. He coined the phrase "Too hip, gotta go!" while at KLOS.

Smith also hosted the late night television show called Rock 'N' America, in 1984.

== Filmography ==
=== Film ===
Year	Title	Role	Notes
1980	Below the Belt	Terry Glantz	
1982	Tag: The Assassination Game	Nick Carpenter	
1984	Electric Dreams	D.J.	
1987	Slam Dance	Radio DJ	
1989	Transylvania Twist	Slick Lambert	
1990	Dead Women in Lingerie	Dead Women in Lingerie	
1990	Repossessed	Announcer	
1990	Pale Blood	Frazer Kelly	
1991	The Fisher King	News Reporter	
1993	Breakfast of Aliens	Lenny Shark	Uncredited
1994	Body Shot	Frazer Smith	
1994	Blankman	Ned Beadie	
1999	Dead Air	Frazer Smith	
2006	The Last Stand	Comic #8	
2022	James the Second	Funeral Pastor	

=== Television ===
Year	Title	Role	Notes
1981	The White Shadow	DJ	Episode: "The Vanity Fare"
1984	Rock 'N' America	Host	
1990	1st & Ten	Moderator	Episode: "Bull Day Afternoon"
1993	Quantum Leap	DJ	Episode: "Memphis Melody"
1993	Johnny Bago	Newscaster	Episode: "Johnny Bago Free at Last"
2005	McBride: Tune in for Murder	Ron Garrison	Television film
2014	Maron	Frazer Smith	Episode: "Radio Cowboy"
2016	Dr. Ken	MC	Episode: "Ken Tries Standup"
2018	Electives	Mr. Wedderbodden	Episode: "Pilot"
