= Doin' Time on Planet Earth =

- Theatrical release poster
- Directed by: Charles Matthau
- Screenplay by: Darren Star
- Story by: Darren Star; Andrew Licht; Jeffrey A. Mueller
- Produced by: Yoram Globus; Menahem Golan
- Starring: Matt Adler; Candice Azzara; Hugh Gillin; Gloria Henry; Timothy Patrick Murphy; Hugh O'Brian; Martha Scott; Nicholas Strouse; Andrea Thompson; Adam West
- Cinematography: Tim Suhrstedt
- Edited by: Alan Balsam; Sharyn L. Ross
- Music by: Dana Kaproff
- Production company: The Cannon Group
- Distributed by: Cannon Film Distributors
- Release date: September 16, 1988
- Running time: 85 minutes
- Country: United States
- Language: English
- Budget: $27 million
- Box office: $29,576

Doin' Time on Planet Earth is a 1988 American comedy film directed by Charles Matthau and written by Darren Star. The film stars Nicholas Strouse, Andrea Thompson, Martha Scott, Adam West, Hugh Gillin, and Matt Adler. The film was released on September 16, 1988, by Cannon Film Distributors.

== Plot ==
The film focuses on Ryan Richmond, an intelligent teenage boy who lives in his family's Holiday Inn in Arizona. Ryan is an outcast amongst his peers and family, to the point where he only has a single friend. His intelligence wins him the ability to study abroad, however Ryan's parents are more interested in the wedding for their eldest son Jeff, who is engaged to the daughter of a politician. Not wanting to attend alone, Ryan asks Lisa, a lounge singer who works at the hotel bar, but she refuses due to a large age gap and lifestyle differences. Ryan then turns to a computer dating service, only for the questions to become stranger and stranger until it tells him that he is an alien.

Soon after Ryan is approached by Charles and Virginia, who inform him that they are also aliens and that they created the dating service as a way to find others like them. They further state that Ryan is their leader, that the coordinates to their home planet is locked inside of his brain and can be unlocked via a sexual encounter, and that his father's rotating lounge is actually a spaceship in disguise that they will use to return to their planet. Ryan is dismissive of their claims but later wonders if they are telling the truth when he realizes that he does have some of the abilities they list as unique to their alien species, such as the ability to inhale helium without any side effects.

Ryan decides to try and unlock the coordinates and convinces a reluctant Lisa to give him a blow-job. This seemingly gives him the coordinates: B52. Charles and Virginia decide that the time to leave is the upcoming blue moon, which coincides with Jeff's wedding. Ryan is initially eager to leave with them, but decides against leaving after Lisa requites his affections. The "aliens" crash the wedding reception at the lounge at the same time his father manages to successfully get the lounge rotating. Charles and Virginia begin to eagerly count down to takeoff, only for their plans to get foiled when an emergency brake Ryan's father installed is enabled. Charles, Virginia, and their followers flee into the desert, with a new plan to investigate the Taj Mahal, leaving it unanswered if they were actually aliens or if they were just delusional.

== Cast ==
- Nicholas Strouse as Ryan Richmond
- Andrea Thompson as Lisa Winston
- Martha Scott as Virginia Camalier
- Adam West as Charles Pinsky
- Hugh Gillin as Fred Richmond
- Matt Adler as Dan Forrester
- Timothy Patrick Murphy as Jeff Richmond
- Candice Azzara as Edna Pinsky
- Gloria Henry as Mary Richmond
- Paula Irvine as Marilyn Richmond
- Hugh O'Brian as Richard Camalier
- Roddy McDowall as Minister
- Maureen Stapleton as Helium Balloon Saleslady
- Dominick Brascia as The Jock
- Kellie Martin as Sheila
- Kelly Mohre Hyman as Donna

== Production ==
The film's working title was Extraterrestrials Only. Principal photography for Doin' Time on Planet Earth began in October 1986 in California and lasted for seven weeks. Per Cinemafantastique, the film had a budget of $27 million; an article in The San Francisco Chronicle listed its budget as $3 million. Cannon chose Charles Matthau to helm the film via their Young Filmmakers Program and Richard Connor served as producer.

For one of the final scenes a rotating turntable was constructed by Reel EFX, Inc that weighed 45,000 pounds and was over 50 feet across. The device cost approximately $100,000 and took four weeks to build.

Brian Wilson wrote and recorded a theme song for the film, which went unused. The song was later reworked as the B-side "Being With the One You Love".

== Release ==
Doin' Time on Planet Earth was initially intended to release in August 1987, but was postponed until it received a theatrical release on September 16, 1988 in the United States.

=== Home media ===
Released on VHS in 1988 by Warner Home Video in Australia.

Released on VHS in 1989 by Warner Home Video in the United States.

Released on VHS on December 18, 1989, by Cannon VMP in Germany.

Released on VHS in 1992 by Transmundo Home Video in Argentina.

== Reception ==
Upon release the film received largely negative reviews. Candice Russell of the South Florida Sun Sentinel was favorable, praising the actors while stating that not everything in the movie works. Hal Mattern of The Arizona Republic rated it one star, noting that the movie tried too hard to be both a cult film and teenage coming of age movie when it "would have been a better movie if it had concentrated on only one theme." Reviews from both The Miami Herald and The Houston Post were also negative.
