= Little Monsters (1989 film) =

1989 film by Richard Alan Greenberg

- Theatrical release poster
- Directed by: Richard Alan Greenberg
- Written by: Terry Rossio; Ted Elliott
- Produced by: John Davis; Jack Grossberg; Andrew Licht; Jeffrey A. Mueller
- Starring: Fred Savage; Daniel Stern; Margaret Whitton; Rick Ducommun; Howie Mandel
- Cinematography: Dick Bush
- Edited by: Patrick McMahon
- Music by: David Newman
- Production companies: Vestron Pictures; Davis Entertainment Company; Licht/Mueller Film Corporation
- Distributed by: United Artists
- Release date: August 25, 1989
- Running time: 102 minutes
- Country: United States
- Language: English
- Budget: $4.5-5 million
- Box office: $793,775

Little Monsters is a 1989 American fantasy comedy film directed by Richard Alan Greenberg, written by Terry Rossio and Ted Elliott, and starring Fred Savage, Daniel Stern, Margaret Whitton, Rick Ducommun, and Howie Mandel. It tells the story of a young boy named Brian Stevenson who befriends a real-life "monster under the bed" named Maurice and discovers a secret world of monsters who sneak into children's bedrooms at night to pull pranks on them. Although the film failed financially, receiving a limited theatrical release due to Vestron's bankruptcy, it obtained a cult following on home video.

== Plot ==
11-year-old Brian Stevenson and his family move to suburban Boston where he feels isolated in his new neighborhood. One morning, Brian finds himself being blamed for several pranks he did not do and is punished for them. Brian blames his 7-year-old younger brother Eric, who claims to have seen a monster the night before, and on the bus ride to their new school, Brian throws his brother's sack lunch out the window in rage, which hits local bully Ronnie Coleman, resulting in a fight between the two at school.

Brian makes a bet to stay in Eric's bedroom but later finds it in shambles and sees a TV remote supernaturally disappear under Eric's bed. The next morning, Eric and his friend Todd find Brian sleeping in the living room and joke about Brian being unable to sleep the entire night in Eric's room. Brian makes a bet to sleep in Eric's room one more night.

Brian sets booby traps, succeeding in trapping the monster Eric saw, a blue-skinned humanoid named Maurice. Though initially scared, Brian soon discovers that he and Maurice share the same interests and befriends him. Brian also learns that sunlight causes the monsters to collapse into piles of clothes. Over several nights, Maurice takes Brian into the supernatural monster world through a portal under his bed. The monster world is filled with junk food and video games, with no adults to supervise. It also has innumerable staircases leading to the spaces beneath children's beds, from which the monsters cause trouble.

Maurice and Brian have fun making mischief in other people's homes during the night, and Brian also befriends a girl named Kiersten at his school. However, Brian begins to notice Maurice's ways of causing mischief can go too far sometimes. Brian also becomes disheartened when he believes that his parents may possibly get a divorce.

One night, Maurice brings Brian along with several other monsters to the bedroom of an infant baby, intending to scare it. Finding this to be cruel, Brian exposes them to light to stop them, but learns that he is turning into a monster when his hand vanishes as the light hits it. He escapes and finds Todd is sleeping in a treehouse. Todd shines a flashlight on Brian, shrinking Brian's arm in the process. The concerned Brian saws off the legs of all the beds in his house.

Maurice is tormented by Snik, another much crueler monster. Snik warns him that Boy, the ruler of the monster world, wants more children, revealing that all the monsters used to be children themselves before being turned. Maurice, not wanting to hurt Brian, refuses and is later captured by Snik and Boy, who then kidnap Eric through a couch bed in his living room.

Brian enlists help from Todd and Kiersten. Gathering an assortment of bright lights, they enter the monster world looking for Eric. They travel up a master staircase to Boy's home. Boy offers to release Eric if Brian agrees to remain in the monster world forever, but Brian refuses. The lights are destroyed, and they are all placed with Maurice in a locked dungeon. They manage to escape and re-arm themselves with more powerful lights, recruiting Ronnie along the way. They return to the monster domain and shine enough light to vaporize Boy, and seemingly also Snik. Brian and his friends rescue Eric, but Snik, having assembled himself back together, blocks their escape. Maurice arrives and sets Snik ablaze with a flamethrower.

Unfortunately, Brian and the others find that they cannot return home because the sun has risen. Faced with the prospect of turning into monsters if they do not return to the human world by sunrise, the children travel in the monster world from the Eastern time zone to Malibu where the sun has not risen yet and they manage to escape. Before entering the human world, Brian shares a heartfelt goodbye with Maurice, who gives Brian his leather vest as a memento, promising to meet again with him someday. The kids run to a payphone and Brian calls home to say that he and Eric are in Malibu and begins to explain their story to their parents.

== Cast ==
- Fred Savage as Brian Stevenson, an 11-year-old boy
- Howie Mandel as Maurice, a monster whom Brian befriends
- Ben Savage as Eric Stevenson, Brian's 7-year-old younger brother
- Daniel Stern as Glen Stevenson, Brian's hot-tempered father
- Margaret Whitton as Holly Stevenson, Brian's mother
- Frank Whaley as Boy, ruler of the monster world
- Rick Ducommun as Snik, Boy's right-hand man
- Amber Barretto as Kiersten, a girl whom Brian has a crush on
- Devin Ratray as Ronnie Coleman, a bully who bothers Brian
- William Murray Weiss as Todd, Eric's best friend

Brian's father Glen is played by Daniel Stern, who was working on The Wonder Years as the elder, retrospective (voice-over) version of Savage's character, Kevin Arnold. Real-life siblings Fred and Ben Savage play the respective roles of siblings Brian and Eric Stevenson, and their sister Kala played two little monsters.

== Production ==
Pre-production designs of Maurice and the main little monsters were created by Alan Munro, previously known for his work on Beetlejuice.

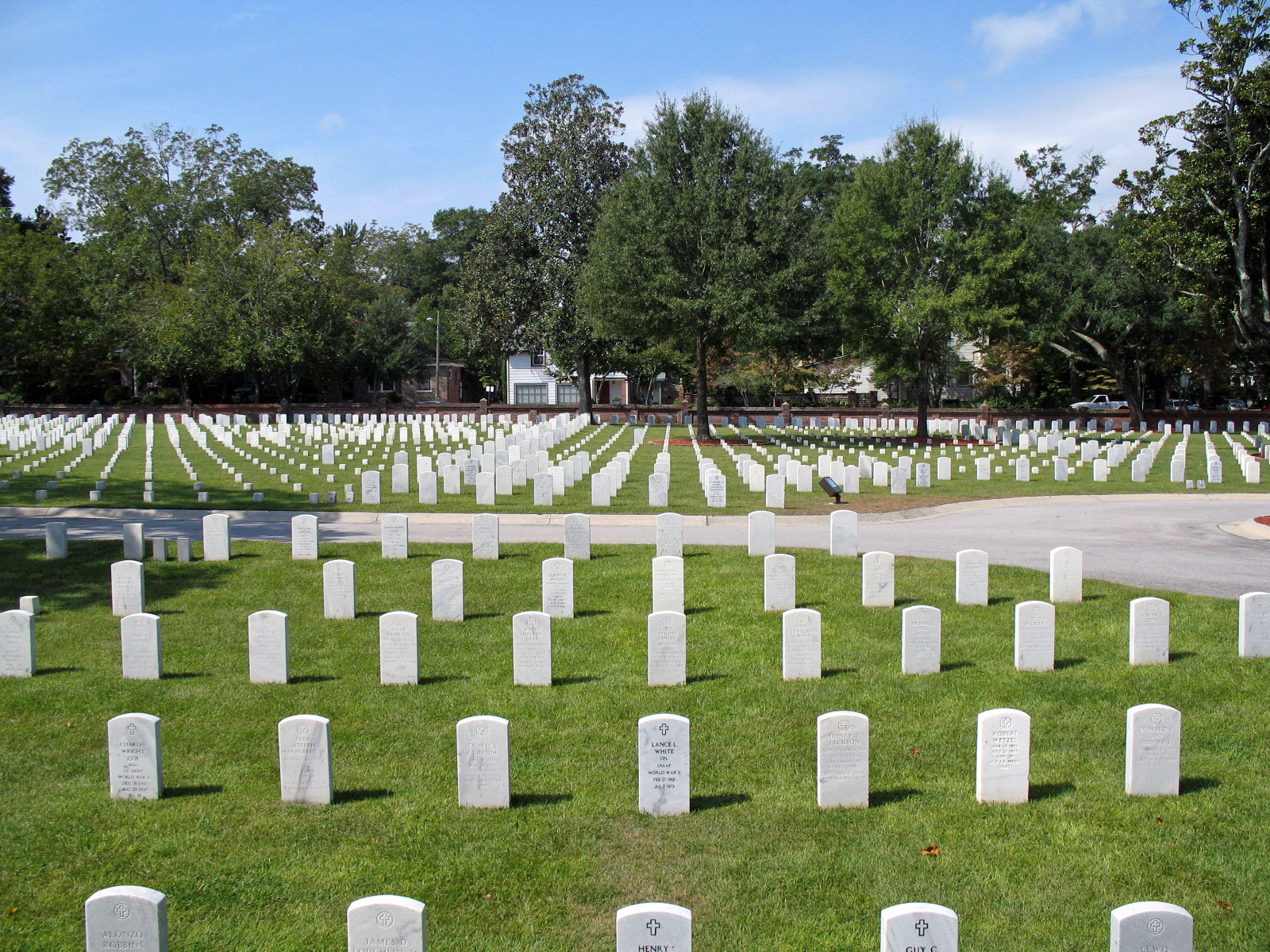
Wilmington National Cemetery, a national cemetery located in Wilmington, North Carolina where Brian walks on his way home.

Principal photography took place from August to October 1988, in Wilmington, North Carolina. Interiors were filmed at DEG Studios (later EUE Screen Gems, and now owned by Cinespace Studios). The monster underworld, the toughest portion of photography, was filmed primarily at the abandoned (and some say notorious) Ideal Cement Plant in Castle Hayne, North Carolina. Many of the stairs and bridges were actually built within the plant; some stairs reaching 20 to 30 feet high. A second unit, also working at the cement plant, created and filmed miniatures for forced-perspective shots with the life-sized sets. Production days at the cement plant totaled 1/3 of the film's principal photography - which went 16 days over schedule due to longer than expected filming at the plant.

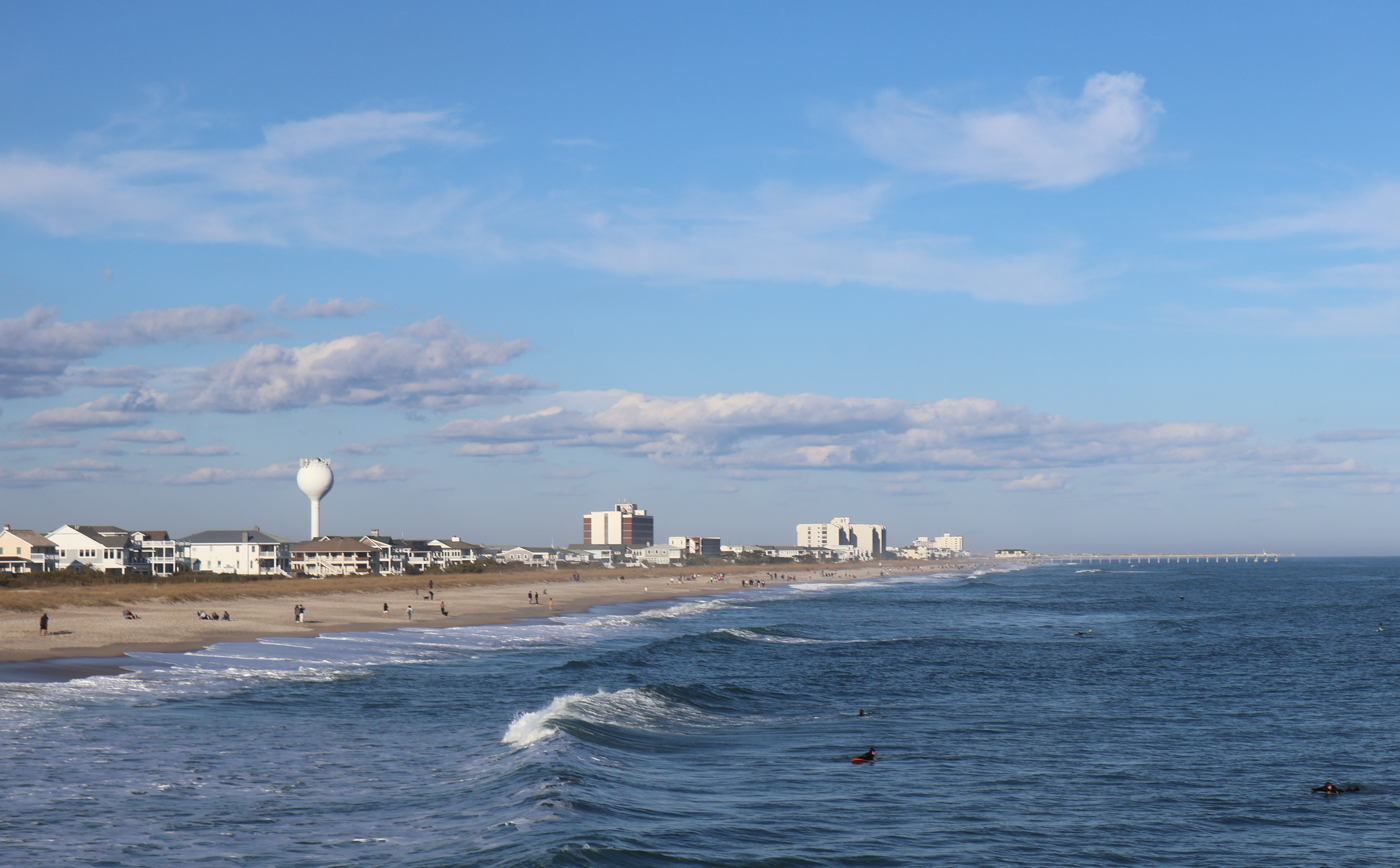
Wrightsville Beach, a town located in New Hanover County where Brian and his friends returns.

Reminiscing about filming at the cement plant, gaffer Jock Brandis told the Wilmington Star-New's Cape Fear: Unearthed podcast in 2021:

"We used to call it Stage 13. It was bad luck. No one wanted to be out there. The reason we used it was because it was this amazingly flexible place; these huge, cavernous spaces made of concrete and steel with walkways and conveyor belts and tunnels and just this fanciful stuff. And you could basically turn it into anything. It was great because the world in Little Monsters was this mythical magical world underground, where it's eternally night and kids who were smart enough could figure out that there was a portal under their beds. It was a world of eternal fun and games and snacks. We had to do this strange underworld thing, so it was video games and weird walkways, catwalks and tunnels. The beauty of it was that it was an indestructible building, so there's nothing you could do to damage it. Even if you're filming inside a stage and you're doing explosions or you're doing collapses, you could destroy the inside of a soundstage. There's no way you could destroy the 3-foot-thick walls of the cement plant."

Other key locations were the Wilmington National Cemetery, Wrightsville Beach, and Forest Hills Global Elementary - where the infamous “Who put piss in my apple juice!” scene was filmed.

The film has at least three known and unreleased deleted scenes. According to one of the film's set production assistants, Steve Head, a sequence in which little monsters use a flamethrower to "clean" an underworld dining room was filmed but deleted from the movie. It was a continuation of the dining room scene that ends with Maurice putting a chocolate cake in his jacket; and it introduced the flamethrower that Maurice uses in the third act. "It must have taken us at least half a day to film that one shot," he said. "The local fire department brought one of their trucks out to the cement plant. It was on stand-by in case anything went wrong. We did one shot and it was great. No problem. Gary Bierend was the Special Effects Coordinator. He operated the flamethrower. Will Purcell assisted. I don't know why they cut it from the film." A monsters' underworld filing room scene was filmed and deleted. Some of its filming can be seen in the behind-the-scenes footage on the Vestron Video Collector's Series Blu-ray. And according to the film's special effects make-up supervisor, Robert Short, another filmed and deleted sequence was an evil toy clown scene. The clown, puppeteered by Short, springs out of the floorboards and threatens Brian, Todd and Kiersten after they enter Boy's room.

Post-production visual effects were created by director Richard Greenberg's company R/Greenberg Associates (now R/GA) in New York.

== Soundtrack ==
The movie soundtrack featured the Talking Heads song "Road to Nowhere" running over the end credits. Two original songs were written for the movie performed by Billie Hughes.

The music supervisors were Gary Goetzman and Sharon Boyle.

Plans for the release of the soundtrack album failed upon the pending bankruptcy of Vestron Pictures.

No.	Title	Writer(s)	Performer(s)	Length
1.	"How I Love You"	Frankie Paul, A. Ellis	Frankie Paul
2.	"Let's Go"		The Paladins
3.	"Reason To Change"	Mike Piccirillo	The Michael Logan Band
4.	"I Wanna Yell"	Billie Hughes, Roxanne Seeman	Billie Hughes
5.	"I Love the Sound of Breaking Glass"	Nick Lowe, Andrew Bodnar (as Al Bodner), Steve Goulding (as Anthony Goulding)	Berton Averre
6.	"Little Bitty Pretty One"	Bobby Day (as Robert Byrd)	Bobby Day (as Robert Byrd)
7.	"Road to Nowhere"	David Byrne, Jerry Harrison Chris Frantz, Tina Weymouth	Talking Heads
8.	"Magic of the Night"	Mike Piccirillo	Billie Hughes

In February, 2023, Enjoy The Ride Records released composer David Newman's complete score on vinyl.

== Release ==
The film was financed by Vestron Pictures. Along with a few other films, the distribution rights were sold to Metro-Goldwyn-Mayer/United Artists after Vestron's bankruptcy (though Vestron retained some foreign rights). It subsequently saw a limited release, with only 179 movie theaters showing the film at its high point, although it grossed just under US$800,000. A DVD release was made available in the United States and Canada on April 6, 2004. Lionsgate released the film on Blu-ray for the first time as part of their "Vestron Video Collector's Series" line on September 15, 2020.

== Reception ==
On Rotten Tomatoes the film has an approval rating of 44% based on reviews from 9 critics, with an average score of 4.5/10.

Chris Willman of the Los Angeles Times found Howie Mandel's monster Maurice to be uncannily close to Beetlejuice although this film is for children. He notes that "there's sweetness and whimsicality in its fantasy, but there's also a fair amount of gross-out humor" and admits that "some of it is actually funny". Willman says the film ultimately turns into a special-effects extravaganza, but seems to have been held back by its limited budget.

== See also ==
- List of American films of 1989
- Monsters, Inc. (A 2001 animated film with a similar premise)
