= Rock 'N' America =

American comedy television series

- Genre: Sketch comedy, music video
- Written by: Rick Ducommun; Phil Kellard; Frazer Smith
- Starring: Rick Ducommun; Frazer Smith; Russ Parr; Fee Waybill; Joe Simon
- Country of origin: United States
- Original language: English

Production
- Producers: Mark Levinson; Bob Hart; Bob Cambridge; Tony Quin; Paul Block

Original release
- Release: 1984 – 1985

Rock 'N' America is an American sketch comedy and music video show.

In most markets which syndicated the program, it was usually aired Friday or Saturday evenings, usually at midnight or later. During Smith's run as host, much of the show's humor revolved around cheese logs and other stereotypes parodying the 1980s club lounge scene. One of the comedy bits featured Smith anchoring a fake newscast, in the style of a Saturday Night Live Weekend Update segment, using the sobriquet "Walter Cheeselog".

In the middle of the series run, the original series host Rick Ducommun was replaced by Frazer Smith. The opening and ending credit music changed also, using a portion of the song "Automatic Sighs" (falsely credited as "Automatic Signs" during the end credits) by the band Strange Advance off their album Worlds Away.
