= Richard Alan Greenberg =

Film designer (1947–2018)

- Born: January 21, 1947; Chicago, Illinois, U.S.
- Died: June 16, 2018 (aged 71); New York City, New York, U.S.
- Occupation(s): Special effects designer, Title designer, Film director
- Spouse: Paula Silver (divorced)
- Children: 3

Richard Alan Greenberg (January 21, 1947 – June 16, 2018) was an American designer of special effects and main titles for feature films. He was nominated for the Academy Award for Best Visual Effects for his work in Predator (1987). He was also nominated for the BAFTA Award for Best Special Visual Effects for his work in Zelig (1983). He also directed the 1989 feature film Little Monsters.

== Early life and education ==
Greenberg was born in Chicago and raised in West Rogers Park. He graduated from Sullivan High School. He earned a bachelor's degree in industrial design and a master's degree in graphics design, both from the University of Illinois Urbana-Champaign.

== Personal life and death ==
His marriage to Paula Silver ended in divorce.

Greenberg died at the age of 71 of appendicitis in New York City on June 16, 2018. He was survived by his brother, Robert, his sister, Carol Felsenthal, and his three children: Luke, Morgan and Jessica Silver-Greenberg.

== Filmography ==
Year	Film	Notes
1980	Xanadu	Special visual effects producer/designer: main title
1980	Resurrection	Special visual sequences
1980	Flash Gordon	Main and end titles producer/designer
1980	Altered States	Title designer
1985	Ladyhawke	Visual effects designer
1987	Predator	Visual consultant
1989	Cookie	Title designer/Opticals
1989	Little Monsters	Director
1989	Family Business	Title designer/Opticals
1990	Goodfellas	Opticals (uncredited)
1991	Hudson Hawk	Title designer
1991	Another You	Title designer
1992	Death Becomes Her	Title designer
1993	Last Action Hero	Visual effects consultant
1994	Richie Rich	Title producer: main and end titles
1996	Executive Decision	Title designer: main and end titles
1997	The Devil's Advocate	Visual effects designer
1998	Phantoms	Visual effects consultant
2002	Star Trek: Nemesis	Title designer: main titles
2003	Timeline	Title designer: Ignite Creative
2010	Edge of Darkness	Title designer
