= Michael Leahy (author) =

American writer and journalist (born 1953)

- Born: January 28, 1953 (age 73); Newark, New Jersey, U.S.
- Education: Yale College
- Occupations: Author; journalist
- Spouse: Jane Leahy
- Children: 1
- Writing career
- Notable works: The Last Innocents; When Nothing Else Matters
- Website: michael-leahy.com

Michael Leahy (born January 28, 1953) is an American author and award-winning writer for The Washington Post and The Washington Post Magazine. He is best known for his latest non-fiction book The Last Innocents, which examines the tumultuous political and social change of the 1960s through the lens of the era's legendary Los Angeles Dodgers.

Leahy has also earned recognition for his 2004 book When Nothing Else Matters, which chronicles basketball superstar Michael Jordan's last comeback to the NBA. Leahy's stories have also been selected for the 2001, 2002, 2003, and 2004 editions of The Best American Sports Writing anthologies. His first book Hard Lessons follows the lives of six Beverly Hills High School students, class of 1986, and deals with the challenges and anxieties of teenage life in modern America.

== Early life ==
Leahy was born in Newark, New Jersey. At age 10, he moved with his family to a suburb of Los Angeles, California. He was present at Sandy Koufax's perfect game.

He is a graduate of Yale College.

== Career ==
A feature writer known for his intimate portraits of subjects, Leahy explores topics varying from politics to social issues to sports. He has written for The Washington Post, Los Angeles Times, Arkansas Democrat-Gazette, and his work has appeared in Washington Post Magazine, TV Guide, Playboy Magazine and Sports Illustrated.

At The Washington Post, Michael Leahy was assigned to cover Michael Jordan while he played on the Washington Wizards. That experience informed Leahy's book When Nothing Else Matters, which was critical of Jordan's performance.

Leahy has published three non-fiction books: Hard Lessons (1988), When Nothing Else Matters (2004) and The Last Innocents (2016).

Along the way, Leahy has covered presidential politics, rural poverty, obesity in the Southern United States, malaria in sub-Saharan Africa, the housecleaner dubbed fisherman-savior of Elian Gonzalez, the United States Army’s recruiting efforts amid the specter of the Iraq war, corporate scandals, a nudist camp, his mother’s struggles with Alzheimer's, and the playing comeback of basketball legend Michael Jordan with the Washington Wizards.

== Awards and accolades ==
- His story on the life of a paroled child murderer spared execution in the early 1970s because of a Supreme Court decision that briefly rendered the death penalty unconstitutional won the Washington D.C. Society of Professional Journalists’ Best Feature Story award.
- In 2004, GQ Magazine named When Nothing Else Matters "the best sports book of the year"
- In 2006, his Washington Post Magazine story about a single mother from Massachusetts who took her two young children across the country to meet their father – a sperm donor known to the woman for years only as Donor 929 – won honors from the Society of Professional Journalists as the best magazine story in the country for that year.
- His sports work has been selected four times for The Best American Sports Writing anthologies, published by Houghton Mifflin Company, which annually features the 25 best sports stories in the nation.
- Leahy won the 2016 Casey Award for The Last Innocents. The book was also nominated as a finalist for the 2017 PEN/ESPN Award for Literary Sports Writing.

== Personal life ==
Leahy resides with his wife Jane in a suburb of Washington, D.C.; they have one child together.

== Bibliography ==
- Hard Lessons: Senior Year at Beverly Hills High School (1988)
- When Nothing Else Matters (2004)
- The Last Innocents: The Collision of the Turbulent Sixties and the Los Angeles Dodgers (2016)
