= When Nothing Else Matters =

Book by Michael Leahy

- When Nothing Else Matters; Hardback Cover
- Author: Michael Leahy
- Cover artist: Jackie Seow (design); Catherine Wessel/Corbis Outline (photo)
- Language: English
- Genre: Sports, Nonfiction
- Published: November 9, 2004 Simon & Schuster
- Publication place: United States
- Media type: Print (Hardcover & Paperback)
- Pages: 448
- ISBN: 0-7432-7648-5

When Nothing Else Matters is a 2004 non-fiction book by Michael Leahy. The book chronicles basketball player Michael Jordan's last comeback to the NBA playing for the Washington Wizards.

== Bibliography ==
- Leahy, Michael. (2004a) When Nothing Else Matters, New York. Simon & Schuster
- Barnes, Simon. "When Nothing Else Matters by Michael Leahy", The Times, January 15, 2005.
