= Saemi Nakamura =

Japanese American actress (active 1992–2016)

- Born: Tokyo, Japan
- Occupation: Actress
- Years active: 1992–2016

Saemi Nakamura is a Japanese American former actress. Often playing minor or unnamed characters, she may be best known for her five episodes, over three seasons, playing Kimiko Nakamura in the NBC science fiction television drama series Heroes. She also appeared in a minor part in the 1995 film Jury Duty and The Truman Show in 1998.

== Filmography ==
=== Film ===
Year	Title	Role	Notes
1992	Samurai Vampire Bikers from Hell	Goddess Nehon	
1994	Natural Born Killers	Japanese Girl #1, Japanese Reporter	
1995	The Dangerous	Akiko	
1995	Jury Duty	Wiener Boy Employee	
1995	Hourglass	Japanese interpreter	Direct-to-video
1996	High School High	Vietnamese Translator	
1996	Blue Devil, Blue Devil		
1997	Contact	Japanese Anchor	
1997	Psycho Sushi	Reiko	
1997	The Android Walks	Riko	
1998	The Truman Show	Japanese Family	
1998	In Quiet Night	Prosecutor	
1999	Snow Falling on Cedars	Sumiko Imada	
1999	The Insider	Japanese Waitress	
2000	Blood: The Last Vampire	Nurse Makiho Caroline Amano (voice)	
2001	The Tag	Barbara	Short film
2005	Come as You Are	Spanking Woman	Credited as Saimi Nakamura
2008	The Kitty Landers Show	Fumiko	Short film
2012	The Rub	Madame	Short film
2016	Kubo and the Two Strings	Villager (voice)	
