= The Last Innocents =

2016 book by Michael Leahy

The Last Innocents: The Collision of the Turbulent Sixties and the Los Angeles Dodgers
- Author: Michael Leahy
- Language: English
- Genre: Non-fiction
- Publisher: HarperCollins
- Publication date: May 10, 2016
- Publication place: United States
- ISBN: 978-0-06-236056-4

The Last Innocents: The Collision of the Turbulent Sixties and the Los Angeles Dodgers is a book by author Michael Leahy, centered around the Los Angeles Dodgers teams of the 1960s. The book was the winner of the 2016 Casey Award as the best baseball book of the year.

== Overview ==
The book examines the tumultuous political and social changes, paranoia and racism of the 1960s through the eyes of the seven "principle" players, covering events such as the assassinations of President Kennedy and Martin Luther King, the civil rights movement and integration within baseball, as well as its impact on the game, and the movement to unionize amongst Major League players.

The principle players were chosen by Leahy due to their different backgrounds, upbringings, ethnicities, and political affiliations:

- Sandy Koufax, widely considered one of the greatest pitchers in baseball history. The book covers Koufax's prime years, his career-ending chronic arm troubles, and his highly publicized contract disputes with the Dodgers' front office, including the 1966 holdout with teammate Don Drysdale. It also covers his encounters with antisemitism within baseball.
- Maury Wills, who sparked an offensive change in baseball by reintroducing the stolen base, then considered to be a lost art. The book covers Wills' early struggles in the minor leagues, his unexpected rise to stardom, and his leadership qualities within the team. It also covers his later struggles with drugs and alcohol.
- Dick Tracewski, a utility infielder who came from a Polish immigrant family. The book covers Tracewski's relationship with Koufax, his roommate and close friend on and off the field, as well as his unexpected roles in both the 1963 and 1965 World Series due to the injuries of teammates.
- Wes Parker, one of the best fielding first basemen in the 1960s. The book covers Parker's upper-class upbringing in California, the abuse he suffered at the hands of his mother as a young boy, and his unlikely rise to the Major Leagues.
- Tommy Davis, at the time considered to be one of the best hitters in the National League. The book discusses Davis' hitting prowess, his season-ending injury in 1965, a turning point in his career, and his later struggles to return to form. It also discusses his role in the integration of Dodgertown, his Brooklyn background, and his first encounters with racism as young minor leaguer.
- Lou Johnson, a journeyman outfielder who played a large role in the 1965 and 1966 pennant-winning Dodger teams. Johnson's early struggles in the minors and his early experience in the Majors is covered extensively as is his sudden rise to prominence after Davis' season-ending injury in 1965.
- Jeff Torborg, a backup catcher who graduated from Rutgers University and came from a middle-class, white suburban family. Torborg is best remembered for catching Koufax's perfect game on September 9, 1965.
