= Hard Lessons =

Non-fiction book by Michael Leahy

Hard Lessons: Senior Year at Beverly Hills High School
- Hard Lessons; Hardback Cover
- Author: Michael Leahy
- Cover artist: Steve Snider (design); Carol Kaplan (photo)
- Language: English
- Published: December 8, 1988 Little, Brown and Company
- Publication place: United States
- Media type: Print (Hardcover & Paperback)
- Pages: 310 pp
- ISBN: 0-316-51815-8
- OCLC: 17551988
- Dewey Decimal: 378/.198/0979493 19
- LC Class: LD7501.B5433 L4 1988

Hard Lessons: Senior Year at Beverly Hills High School is a 1988 nonfiction book by Michael Leahy.

== Plot overview ==
The book follows the lives of six Beverly Hills High School students, class of 1986, and deals with the challenges and anxieties of teenage life in modern America.

== Characters ==
- Andy: a slight, nervous boy, sick with the sense that he has fallen hopelessly behind his peers and has already lost the race for good grades, entrance to the top colleges, stature, girls—a future.
- Hillary: an insecure beauty who, though a promising model, feels crowded and dwarfed by Beverly's social extracurricular and academic pressures, not to mention the anxiety generated by her mother's doctor-boyfriend, soon to be a member of their household.
- Steven: a student with aspirations to be a wealthy man and Republican party media consultant—a baby kingmaker—who must first navigate the perilous waters leading toward another semester of A's and, he hopes, an Ivy League college acceptance.
- Kelly: a lonely girl who avoids mirrors and eats most meals alone with her housekeeper, whose principal contact with her real estate agent-mother comes in late-night long-distance phone calls, and whose overwhelming obsession lies in becoming svelte enough to compete with Beverly's nubile social butterflies.
- Paul: an overweight, funny, self-deprecating boy with an enigmatic and troubled best friend and self-absorbed parents who know their son dimly at best.
- Melinda: the model toward which the others aspire; a pleasantly attractive maverick who is academically successful, socially respected, and dependent on no cliques for stature or affection.

== Reviews ==
- Kendall Hailey of the Los Angeles Times: "Michael Leahy's 'Hard Lessons: Senior Year at Beverly Hills High School' traces the last year in the high school careers of six very different seniors. Extensive interviews were conducted with many Beverly Hills High School seniors, and all the book derives from real-life experience. However, for anonymity's sake, the six seniors we follow are all composite characters, and the book reads like a novel. Quite a trick considering the author had to work exclusively with the truth. As Evelyn Waugh said: 'A writer has to modify truth to make it plausible.'"

== Bibliography ==
- Leahy, Michael. (1988a) Hard Lessons, Boston. Little, Brown and Company.
- Hailey, Kendall. "Down and Out at Beverly Hills High HARD LESSONS Senior Year at Beverly Hills High School by Michael Leahy", The Los Angeles Times, November 20, 1988. Accessed April 12, 2008.
