= Stephen Semel =

American film and television editor

- Occupation: Film editor

Stephen Semel (sometimes credited as Steve Semel or Steven Semel) is an American film and television editor, film producer, production manager, and actor. He has worked as an editor for mainstream movies, such as Airheads, The Count of Monte Cristo, Fandango, Kuffs, License to Drive, Miracle Mile, My Giant, One Eight Seven, Only the Strong, Three to Tango, The Truth About Cats & Dogs, The Way of the Gun, and You So Crazy. Semel has also edited episodes of several television series, including episodes of Century City, Dragnet, Kyle XY, House, Melrose Place, and Tales from the Crypt.

Semel has edited forty-one episodes of Lost, appearing as Adam, one of "The Others", in the season 3 premiere, "A Tale of Two Cities". From 2006 to 2010, Semel was nominated for the Primetime Emmy Award for Outstanding Single-Camera Picture Editing for a Drama Series for his work on the series, for the episodes "Live Together, Die Alone" (2006), "Through the Looking Glass" (2007), "There's No Place Like Home" (2008), "The Incident" (2009), and "The End" (2010), winning in 2010 (shared with Mark Goldman, Christopher Nelson, and Henk Van Eeghan). In addition, Semel directed two episodes, "Ji Yeon" and "The Last Recruit", in 2008 and 2010, respectively.

As well as editing eight episodes, Semel was an associate producer for Tales from the Crypt, for eighteen episodes, and was an associate producer for Steven Spielberg's Amazing Stories. He was a producer for the VHS releases – Books 1–5, along with being post-production supervisor (credited as Steven Semel) for two episodes of the series.

Semel was also an assistant film editor for Apocalypse Now (credited as Steve Semel) and an associate film editor for Galaxina. He was also an assistant editor for Back to the Future and an additional film editor for I'm Gonna Git You Sucka.

== Selected filmography ==
Editor
Year	Film	Director	Notes
1985	Fandango	Kevin Reynolds	First collaboration with Kevin Reynolds
1988	License to Drive	Greg Beeman	
1988	Miracle Mile	Steve De Jarnatt	
1992	Kuffs	Bruce A. Evans	
1993	Only the Strong	Sheldon Lettich	
1994	Airheads	Michael Lehmann	First collaboration with Michael Lehmann
1995	Jury Duty	John Fortenberry	
1996	The Truth About Cats & Dogs	Michael Lehmann	Second collaboration with Michael Lehmann
1997	One Eight Seven	Kevin Reynolds	Second collaboration with Kevin Reynolds
1998	My Giant	Michael Lehmann	Third collaboration with Michael Lehmann
1999	Three to Tango	Damon Santostefano	
2000	The Way of the Gun	Christopher McQuarrie	
2002	The Count of Monte Cristo	Kevin Reynolds	Third collaboration with Kevin Reynolds
2004	Madhouse	William Butler	

Editorial department
Year	Film	Director	Role
1979	Apocalypse Now	Francis Ford Coppola	Assistant film editor
1980	Galaxina	William Sachs	Associate film editor
1982	The Escape Artist	Caleb Deschanel	Assistant editor
1984	The Buddy System	Glenn Jordan	Assistant editor
1988	I'm Gonna Git You Sucka	Keenen Ivory Wayans	Additional film editor

Thanks
Year	Film	Director	Role
1985	Back to the Future	Robert Zemeckis	Special thanks

Documentaries

Editor
Year	Film	Director	Notes
1994	You So Crazy	Thomas Schlamme	Stand-up film

TV movies

Editor
Year	Film	Director	Notes
1991	Blood Ties	Jim McBride	
1994	Cosmic Slop	Reginald Hudlin	"Space Traders" segment
1997	Before Women Had Wings	Lloyd Kramer	

TV series

Editor
Year	Title	Notes
1992	Melrose Place	1 episode
1989−92	Tales from the Crypt	8 episodes
2003	Dragnet	4 episodes
2004	Century City	9 episodes
2006	Kyle XY	1 episode
2009	House	1 episode
2004−10	Lost	42 episodes
2019	Jack Ryan	2 episodes
2016−20	Westworld	2 episodes

Actor
Year	Title	Role	Notes
2006	Lost	Adam	1 episode

Director
Year	Title	Notes
2008−10	Lost	2 episodes
2012−15	Person of Interest	2 episodes

Producer
Year	Title	Credit	Notes
1985−87	Amazing Stories	Associate producer	29 episodes
1990	Tales from the Crypt	Associate producer	18 episodes
2010−12	Undercovers	Associate producer	11 episodes
2012	Alcatraz	Co-producer	13 episodes
2011−15	Person of Interest	Co-producer; Producer; Supervising producer	90 episodes
2016−20	Westworld	Co-producer; Producer; Supervising producer	28 episodes
2024	Fallout	Co-executive producer	8 episodes

Production manager
Year	Title	Role	Notes
1992	Tales from the Crypt	Post-production supervisor	2 episodes
