= Kelly Hyman =

American lawyer, actress, model, TV personality

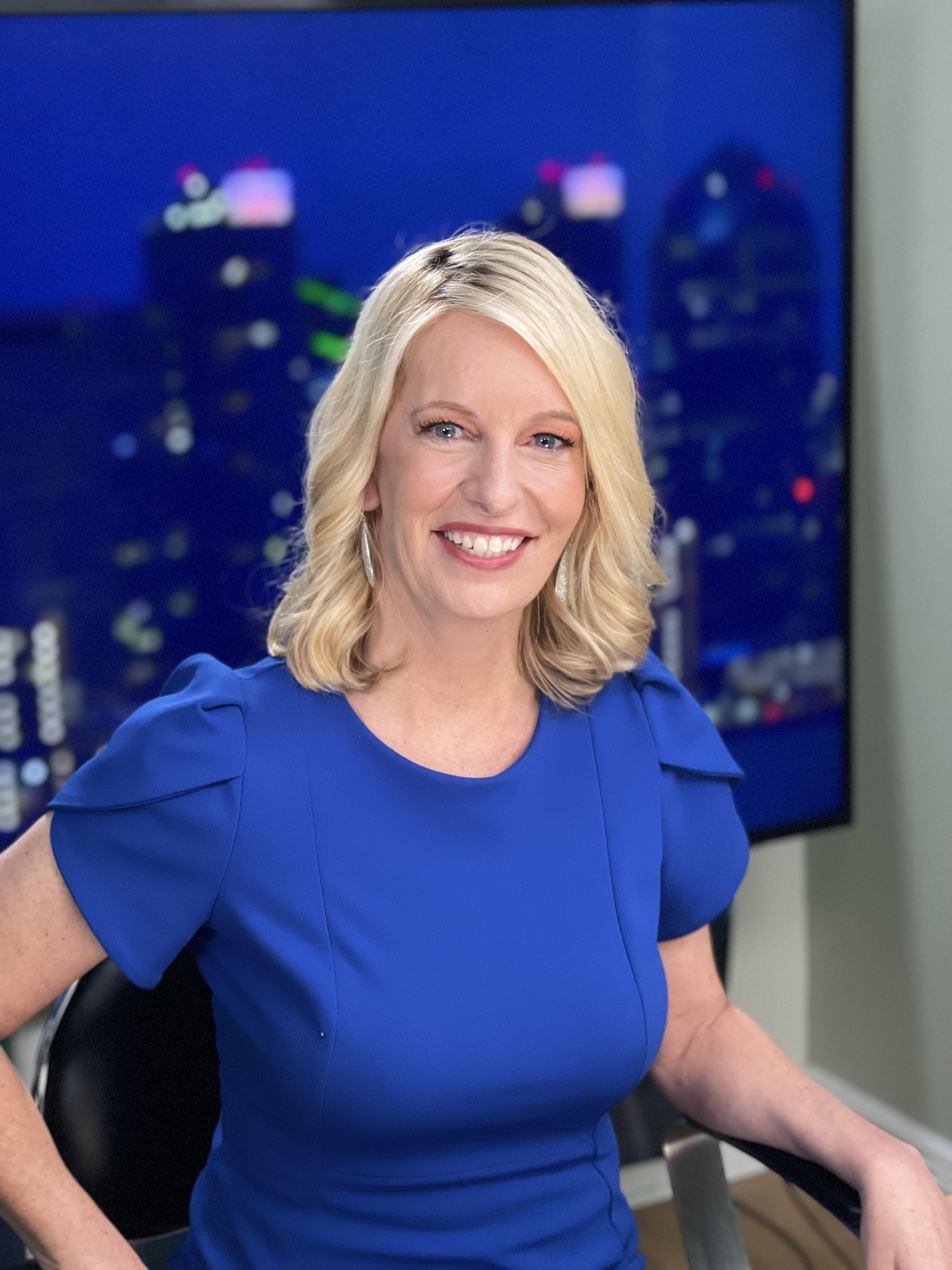
- Occupations: Lawyer, Actress, Model
- Known for: President of the Federal Bar Association of Palm Beach County, Florida

Kelly Hyman is an Australian-American attorney based in Florida. She has served as president of the Federal Bar Association's Palm Beach County chapter. Earlier in her career, she worked as an actress and model, appearing in television and film roles during the 1980s and 1990s.

Her television appearances included a role as Loretta on The Young and the Restless. She also appeared in the film Getting There and co-starred with Adam West in Doin' Time on Planet Earth.

== Early life and education ==
Hyman was born in Miami Beach, Florida, and was raised by a single mother. In 2003, she graduated with honors from the University of Florida Law School, obtaining her Juris Doctor degree.

== Career ==
Hyman began her career as a child actor in the 1980s. During her acting career, she appeared in television series including The Young and the Restless and Three's Company. She performed in off-Broadway productions in New York City. In film, she starred as Donna in Doin' Time on Planet Earth with Adam West. As a voice actress, she lent her voice to various commercials, including the Kit Kat "Give me a break" advertisement.

After her acting career, Hyman pursued a career in law. She later served as president of the Federal Bar Association's Palm Beach Chapter and was a board member of Dress for Success Palm Beach.

Hyman has participated in political activities, including volunteering during presidential campaigns and serving as a poll watcher. In 2019, she founded The Hyman Law Firm, P.A.

In 2023, she launched Once Upon a Crime in Hollywood, a true crime podcast covering a range of crime cases.
