= Martin Lawrence Live: Runteldat =

2002 film

- Theatrical release poster
- Directed by: David Raynr
- Written by: Martin Lawrence
- Produced by: David Gale; Beth Hubbard; Michael Hubbard; Loretha C. Jones
- Starring: Martin Lawrence
- Cinematography: Daryn Okada
- Edited by: Nicholas Eliopoulos
- Production companies: MTV Films; Runteldat Entertainment
- Distributed by: Paramount Pictures
- Release date: August 2, 2002
- Running time: 113 minutes
- Country: United States
- Language: English
- Budget: $3 million
- Box office: $19.1 million

Martin Lawrence Live: Runteldat is a 2002 American stand-up comedy concert film starring Martin Lawrence, and directed by David Raynr, also responsible for Whatever It Takes. Lawrence also has producing and writing credits for the film. It is Lawrence's second stand-up comedy film after You So Crazy was released in 1994.

Shot on location at the DAR Constitution Hall in Washington, D.C., the film features Lawrence addressing several personal and legal issues that he faced in the months prior to the performance. The issues resulted in him taking a lengthy hiatus. In addition, Lawrence tackles subjects such as marriage, his divorce, childbirth, old age, and more.

Martin Lawrence Live: Runteldat was released by Paramount Pictures on August 2, 2002, and went on to gross $19.1 million at the box office, almost seven times its production cost of $3 million.

== Reception ==
On review aggregator Rotten Tomatoes, the film has a rating of 39%. The critic consensus reads "Lawrence's delivery can be funny, but the content is stale." The film aired frequently on Comedy Central through the early-to-mid 2000s.
