= You So Crazy =

- Theatrical release poster
- Directed by: Thomas Schlamme
- Written by: Martin Lawrence
- Produced by: Martin Lawrence
- Starring: Martin Lawrence
- Edited by: Stephen Semel
- Music by: Thomas Hayes
- Production companies: HBO Independent Productions; Cinemax
- Distributed by: The Samuel Goldwyn Company
- Release date: April 27, 1994
- Running time: 85 minutes
- Country: United States
- Language: English
- Box office: $10,184,701

You So Crazy is a 1994 stand up comedy film directed by Thomas Schlamme and starring Martin Lawrence. It was his first major film and stand-up act. Lawrence wears a black, leather suit in the film similar to the wardrobe worn by Eddie Murphy in his films Delirious and Raw.

During the routine, Lawrence comments on various topics such as his success, growing up, sexual acts and racism. The concert was filmed at the Majestic Theatre in 1993 in New York City before a sold-out crowd. Martin followed You So Crazy up with Martin Lawrence Live: Runteldat in 2002.

You So Crazy helped Lawrence breakout during the early 1990s. The film went on to become a success for Lawrence, generating over $10 million at the box office. The film also gained popularity thanks to late night airings on HBO and Cinemax.

The film originally received an NC-17 rating from the MPAA, causing Miramax (the film's original distributor) to sell it to Samuel Goldwyn, which released it unrated.

== Notes ==
The movie made its exclusive premiere on Cinemax, post-theatrical run, either in late 1994 or 1995.

== Reception ==
On Rotten Tomatoes it has an approval rating of 50% based on reviews from 10 critics.
