= Beverly Hills Unified School District =

School district of Beverly Hills, California

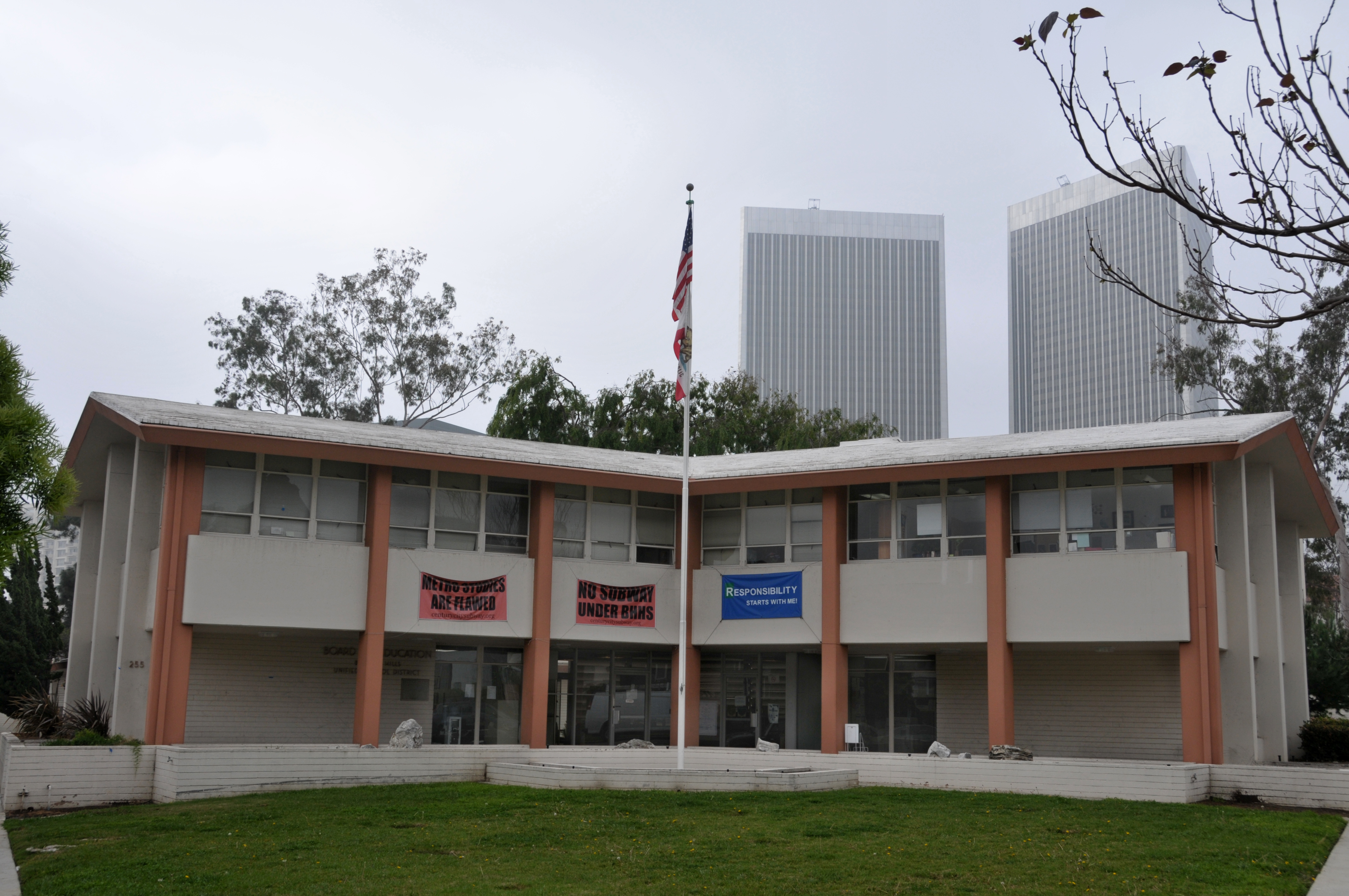
- School District building in 2015

Address
- 624 N. Rexford Dr. Beverly Hills, California, 90212; United States
- Coordinates: 34°03′45″N 118°24′37″W

District information
- Grades: K through 12
- Established: March 23, 1936; 90 years ago
- Superintendent: Alex Cherniss
- Schools: 6
- NCES District ID: 0604830

Students and staff
- Students: 3,074 (2023–2024)
- Teachers: 206.06 (on an FTE basis)

Other information
- Website: bhusd.org

The Beverly Hills Unified School District (abbreviated BHUSD) is a public school district based in the city of Beverly Hills, California. It was unified into an elementary and high school district in 1936. Serving the city of Beverly Hills, it consists of one middle school, three elementary schools, and one high school (Beverly Hills High School).

== History ==
The Los Angeles City High School District annexed the Beverly Hills elementary school district on August 18, 1921. The elementary school district unified on March 23, 1936, as it established high school operations, therefore separating it from the Los Angeles high school district.

In June 2010, the BHUSD began to deny permits to allow out-of-district students at BHUSD schools to continue attending BHUSD, stirring local controversy.

== Board of education ==
The BHUSD Board of Education consists of five members elected by the residents of Beverly Hills. Meetings are held bimonthly.

== Demographics ==
The reputation of Beverly Hills Unified was one of the factors that attracted large numbers of Iranian Jews to the Beverly Hills area beginning in the 1970s. By 1990 about 20% of the students of the BHUSD were Iranian, prompting the district to hire a counselor for Iranians and to write announcements in Persian. The Iranian Education Foundation donated money to the district. In the BHUSD Nowruz is a school holiday.

== Schools ==
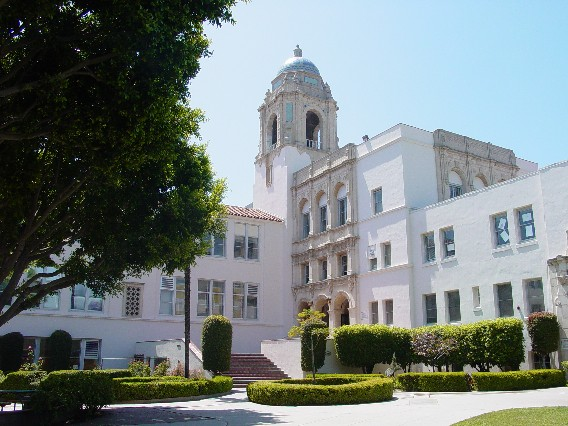
El Rodeo School.

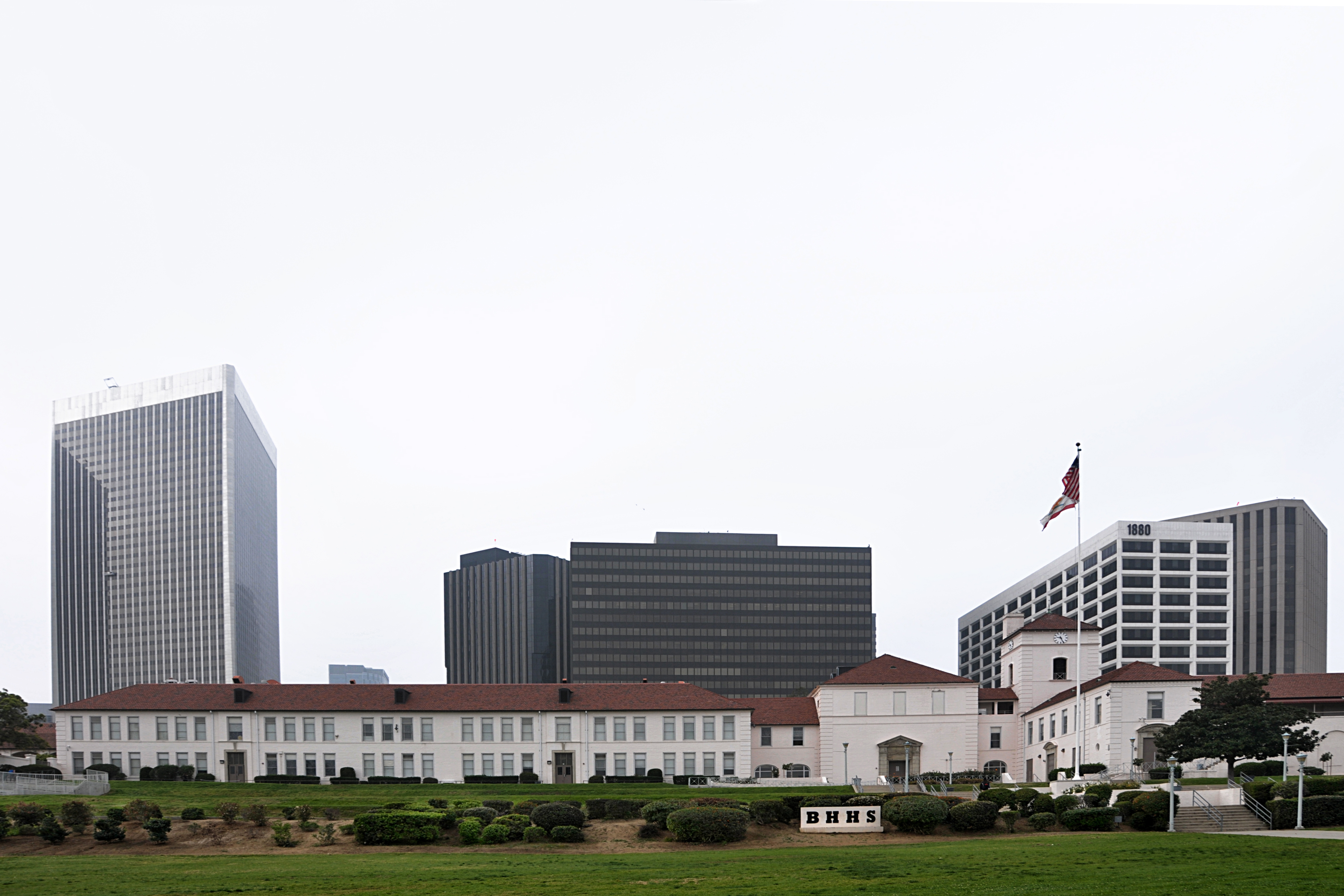
Beverly Hills High School

BHUSD hosts three elementary, one middle, and one high school.

=== Elementary schools ===
==== El Rodeo School ====
El Rodeo School used to serve students in kindergarten through eighth grade. Beginning in 2019, El Rodeo serves students only in kindergarten through fifth grade. El Rodeo School was established in 1927 and enrolls 743 students on its campus at 605 Whittier Drive.

==== Hawthorne School ====
Hawthorne School used to serve students in kindergarten through eighth grade. Beginning in 2019, Hawthorne serves students only in grades kindergarten through fifth grade. Established in 1914, the school enrolls approximately 600 pupils and occupies most of the 600 block of North Rexford Drive. It is the oldest elementary school in BHUSD. Among its alumni are Jack Abramoff and Monica Lewinsky.

In 2014, Hawthorne received the California Distinguished School Award. It was also awarded the National Schools to Watch Award in 2015.

Hawthorne had the highest Academic Performance Index score in the district for the 2007-2008 year, based on the California STAR tests. On May 24, 2024, the school had announced their closing of the school, as El Rodeo has finished their construction. On June 1, classes at the school were held there for the last time.

==== Horace Mann School ====
Horace Mann School is named for Horace Mann and used to serve students in kindergarten through eighth grade. Beginning in 2019, Horace Mann serves students in kindergarten through fifth grade. Established in 1929, the school enrolls 723 students in its campus at 8701 Charleville Blvd. The principal is Craig Bugbee.

On March 18, 1929, construction began on a two-story, 30-room Spanish-style school building. In July, the school was named Horace Mann School, and 307 students and 11 teachers entered its doors in Kindergarten through sixth grade on December 9, 1929. The school was officially dedicated on March 21, 1930. The first seventh-grade students began attending in February 1930, and the first eighth graders arrived in the fall of 1930. The first graduating class of 30 students was in June 1930. In 1932 and 1933, the school was expanded, closing off most of Arnaz Drive for playground space and to ensure safe passage for the students between the buildings. In 1962–1963, the music, art, and industrial arts wing were remodeled. In 1966, the auditorium was reconstructed, and in 1968, the school's tower building was opened. A faculty parking structure, with middle school classrooms above, was built in 1975. Additional property on Robertson Boulevard was acquired in the 1980s.

Horace Mann School was awarded the California Distinguished School Award in 1987, 1997, 2004, and 2008. The school is ranked 639 of 5365 elementary schools in California and is rated 93 on a 100-point scale.

=== Middle school ===
==== Beverly Vista Middle School ====
From 1924 to 2018 Beverly Vista School served students from preschool through eighth grade. In fall 2019, the school name changed to Beverly Vista Middle School and began serving students in grades six to eight. Established in 1924, the school enrolls 723 students in the 200 block of South Elm Drive. A new building B was dedicated on October 3, 2007. Beverly Vista's B building includes a bell tower, an auditorium with a balcony, and classrooms for the band, choir, and other classes.

Beverly Vista Middle School was awarded the California Distinguished School Award in 1989, 1993, 1997, and 2004. Beverly Vista Middle School also received the No Child Left Behind National Blue Ribbon Award in 2005.

=== High schools ===
Beverly Hills High School serves grades 9 through 12. The principal is Drew Stewart.

== Political issues & controversies ==
=== Security and safety ===
The district attempted to utilize Evidence-Based Incorporated's (EBI) armed guards to protect the students after the Beverly Hills City council refused to continue their School Resource Officer (SRO) program, at the request of then-Police Chief Dave Snowden. EBI declared bankruptcy the very same year. Police Chief Snowden was a salaried consultant for EBI. The district was sued by Madison, the financier of EBI, for breach of contract. In 2018, the district hired Nastec International, Inc. to provide armed guards, filling the vacancy left by Chief Snowden and EBI.

The Beverly Hills Unified School District implemented another phase of its safety program in 2018, to begin in the fall of 2019. The school district could become "the most advanced public school district in the nation when it comes to safety."

=== Subway extension ===
The BHUSD Board of Education opposed LA Metro's proposal to have the D Line Extension tunnel beneath Beverly Hills High School with concerns about incineration by underground gases, poisoning from fumes, terrorist attacks, and underground construction accidents. The school board spent several million dollars in legal fees and appealed to then Transportation Secretary Elaine Chao and Donald Trump to cut off federal funding for the project. In May 2021, Judge George H. Wu granted a motion for summary judgment in favor of the Metro.

=== Credit card misuse ===
According to the LA Times, Superintendent Robert Pellicone was fired after it was discovered that he used the district's card to "run up bar and hotel tabs in Beverly Hills, San Francisco, and other cities." Superintendent Robert Pellicone claimed he was fired due to his sexuality.

=== Flying of the Flag of Israel ===
In August 2025, the school board gathered media coverage for its decision to fly the flag of Israel during the month of May. Board member Sigalie Sabag, who supported the motion, said "this is a time right now that Jews are being killed and slaughtered on the street, and threats are happening." Opponents of the measure criticizes the action as blurring the line between supporting the Jewish community and endorsing the actions of the Israeli government during the Gaza war and not recognizing that other ethnic and religious groups exist within the school district. CAIR voiced its opposition stating that the action “is deeply insensitive and distressing to Palestinian students who have lost countless family members to Israel’s violent military campaign.”
