= Neil Tolkin =

Canadian screenwriter

- Born: Montreal, Quebec, Canada
- Education: Dawson College; McGill University
- Occupation: Screenwriter

Neil Tolkin is a Canadian screenwriter from Montreal. He attended Westmount High School and Dawson College and McGill University.

== Career ==
He is best known for contributing to comedies, such as License to Drive with Corey Haim and Corey Feldman, Ri¢hie Ri¢h with Macualy Culkin and Jury Duty with Pauly Shore. He's also written dramas such as the screenplay for the film The Emperor's Club (2002), and an early draft for the World War Two film, Unbroken, to be originally directed by Antoine Fuqua. The film was rewritten and later finally directed by Angelina Jolie.

He also wrote and directed the drama Sticks and Stones in 1996.

== Filmography ==
- Unbroken (2015) (uncredited)
- The Emperor's Club (2002)
- Sticks and Stones (1996)
- Jury Duty (1995)
- Ri¢hie Ri¢h (1994)
- License to Drive (1988)
