= Beverly Hills High School =

Public high school in Beverly Hills, California

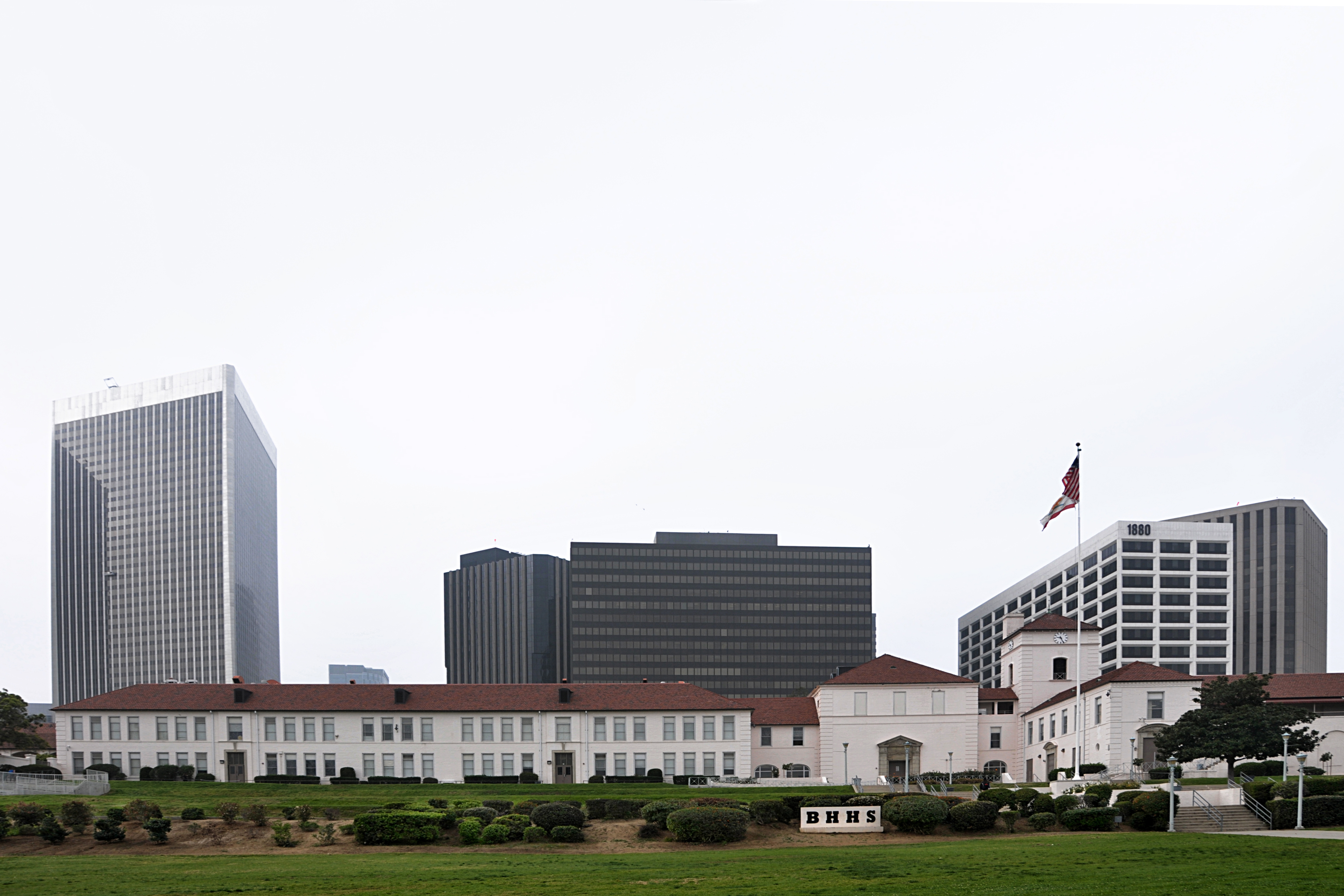
- The school in 2015

Location
- 241 Moreno Drive; Beverly Hills, California 90212; United States; 34.06285°N 118.41246°W

Information
- Type: Public high school
- Motto: Today well lived
- Established: 1927; 99 years ago
- School district: Beverly Hills Unified School District
- NCES School ID: 060483000471
- Principal: Loan Sriruksa
- Teaching staff: 78.71 (on FTE basis)
- Grades: 9th–12th
- Enrollment: 1,178 (2023–2024)
- Student to teacher ratio: 14.97
- Campus type: Urban
- Colors: Orange; Black
- Athletics conference: CIF Southern Section; Ocean League
- Nickname: Normans
- Newspaper: Highlights
- Yearbook: Watchtower
- Website: bhhs.bhusd.org

Beverly Hills High School (shortly as BHHS or Beverly) is a public high school in Beverly Hills, California. The other public high school in Beverly Hills is Moreno High School, a small alternative school located on Beverly Hills High School's campus.

Beverly Hills High School is part of the Beverly Hills Unified School District and located on 19.5 acres (7.9 ha) on the west side of Beverly Hills, at the border of the Century City area of Los Angeles. The land was previously part of the Beverly Hills Speedway board track, which was torn down in 1924. Beverly, which serves all of Beverly Hills, was founded in 1927. The original buildings were designed by Robert D. Farquhar in the French Normandy style. The school previously received income from its on-campus oil tower.

== History ==
Beverly Hills High School was originally in the Los Angeles City High School District. On March 23, 1936, the Beverly Hills Elementary School District left the Los Angeles City High School District and formed the Beverly Hills High School District; by operation of law this became the Beverly Hills Unified School District.

During the 1999–2000 and 2004–2005 school years, Beverly Hills High School was recognized with the Blue Ribbon School Award of Excellence by the United States Department of Education, the highest award an American school can receive. Newsweek ranked Beverly Hills High School as the 267th best public high school in the country.

== Admissions ==
Most students are residents of Beverly Hills. Historically, the only non-resident students allowed to enroll in Beverly Hills High were the children of employees of BHUSD, children of employees of the City of Beverly Hills, and students enrolled in the "multicultural program". Students in that program, which was financed by state funds tied to student attendance, were required to supply their own transportation. The program accepted 30 students each year.

The program began in the 1970s in order to expose the predominately white students to other ethnicities. Originally, the program only admitted students who graduated from Emerson Middle School in Westwood; however, due to complaints it was taking away the best students from University High School, which Emerson feeds into, it was expanded to 11 LAUSD middle schools in 1991.

Beginning in the early 2010s, the governing board began to limit the admission of non-residents of Beverly Hills. Currently inter-district enrollment is permitted only for children of employees of the City, faculty/staff of the school district, and a small number of grandchildren of Beverly Hills residents. Most basic aid districts in California have no student permits, not even for faculty/staff children.

== Student demographics ==
As of 1991, 19% of the students were Iranian, and almost 20% of the students were either Asian, Black, and/or Hispanic. In 2008, Beverly Hills High School had 2,412 students: 70% White, 17% Asian, 5% Black, 4% Hispanic.

Beginning in 2010, when the Beverly Hills Unified School District adopted a basic-aid funding formula and ended its Diversity Permit program, the demographics of Beverly's student body had shifted considerably. In 2014, the student body was 72% white, 16% Asian, 6% black, and 5% Hispanic. By 2017, the high school total population had dropped to 1,482, and the demographics of enrolled students were: 73% Caucasian, 13% Asian, 8% Hispanic, and 3% African-American.

The student body is, as of 2008, predominantly Jewish. Many students are Iranian Americans, many of whom at the school are Persian Jewish. Due to the large number of students of Iranian origin, the school has historically scheduled a staff development day on or around Nowruz.

As of 2012, about 35% of Beverly's current student body was born outside the United States, and 41% of its students speak a first language other than English. As of 1991 home languages other than English included Mandarin Chinese, French, Hebrew, Korean, and Russian.

As of 2022, according to a US News report, Beverly Hills High School has 29.6% minority enrollment.

Some television shows, like Beverly Hills, 90210, have been criticized for not accurately portraying the student body.

== Controversies ==
=== Enrollment controversies ===
The Beverly Hills Unified School District has faced controversies in student enrollment, mainly regarding diversity, and more recently, legacy enrollment (alumni preference).

For many years Beverly has selected high-achieving students from twelve LAUSD middle schools on diversity permits in an attempt to increase the number of minorities enrolled. Selections have been made based on test scores, grades and writing samples. According to enrollment data for the 2006–2007 school year, however, seven out of ten students who entered the school this way were of Asian ethnicity. In April 2007, due to pressure from parents and activist Earl Ofari Hutchinson, who criticized the school for not recruiting more African-American and Latino students, then-Superintendent Kari McVeigh agreed to extend the application deadline until April 27, as reported in the Los Angeles Times and The Beverly Hills Courier, hoping that more students from these minority groups would seek to enroll. According to the Beverly Hills Courier (May 25, 2007), "civil rights leaders hailed the final student selections" as "an honest effort to obtain ethnic diversity."

In 2012, the school board voted not to issue new inter-district permits for the upcoming school year, which discontinued those out-of-district students who could apply for special permission to attend BHHS.

=== Subway tunnel underneath school ===
In 2008, voters approved a half-cent increase in the sales tax in order to expand the L.A. subway system. The so-called D Line Extension would build out the subway through Beverly Hills at an estimated cost of $2.5 billion, adding seven new subway stations. Ultimately, the new extension – called the “Subway to the Sea” – would connect downtown’s Union Station to the Pacific Ocean in Santa Monica, with the first phase going as far west as the West LA/Veteran's Administration station, just west of the 405 freeway.

The next year, Beverly Hills voters elected Lisa Fisch Korbatov to the Board of Education, where she later served as president. For nine years, until she left office at the end of 2018, Korbatov led the school board and Beverly Hills city officials to oppose the expansion of the subway tunnel beneath BHHS, citing worries about explosions, carcinogens from seeping fumes, and even a possible terrorist attack.

In October 2018, BHHS students protested against the plans to build the Metro D Line extension beneath the high school. In addition to its 1500 students, BHHS also serves as the emergency preparedness center for the city of Beverly Hills. The City of Beverly Hills also unsuccessfully sued the subway project in court, in an effort to prevent it from building a tunnel underneath BHHS. The high school is built over an oil field (which at the time was still active) and is located near an earthquake fault, so the city and school contended that the tunnel would pose a safety threat to students and faculty.

Despite over $15 million expended on the litigation, much of it funded from school improvement bonds, the use of which was questioned by a citizens' oversight committee, the District was ultimately unsuccessful and on May 18, 2020, Judge George H. Wu ruled in favor of Metro, holding that it had satisfied the requirements of the National Environmental Policy Act in documenting its choice of route.

=== Oil wells ===
A cluster of nineteen oil wells in a single "drilling island" on Beverly's campus can easily be seen by drivers heading west on Olympic Boulevard toward Century City. The oil wells have pumped much of the oil from under Beverly's campus, and many have been slant drilling into productive regions of the western part of the Beverly Hills Oil Field under many homes and apartment buildings in Beverly Hills for decades.

As of May 2006, the Beverly Hills High School wells were pumping out 400 barrels (64 m^{3}) to 500 barrels (79 m^{3}) a day, earning the school approximately $300,000 a year in royalties.

In the late-1990s an art studio run by two Beverly High graduates volunteered to cover the well enclosure, which at that time was solid gray in color, with individual tiles that had been painted by kids with cancer.

Beverly gained more notoriety when Erin Brockovich and Ed Masry announced having filed three lawsuits in 2003 and 2004 on behalf of 25, 400, and 300 (respectively) former students who attended Beverly from the 1970s until the 1990s. In April 2003, the Texas-based law firm of Baron & Budd partnered with the law office of Masry & Vititoe to lend its expertise in lawsuits related to health risks of volatile chemicals. The number of actual cancer claims filed in Santa Monica was ninety-four.

The lawsuits claimed that toxic fumes from the oil wells caused the former students to develop cancer. The oil wells are very close to all of Beverly's sports facilities, including the soccer field, the football field, and the racetrack. Beverly students—not just athletes but students taking required physical education classes from the 1970s until the 1990s—were required to run near the oil wells.

The city, the school district, and the oil companies named as defendants disputed this assertion, claiming that they had conducted air quality tests with results showing that air quality is normal at the high school. In 2003, the University of Southern California Keck School of Medicine published a "Community Cancer Assessment Regarding Beverly Hills, California" which failed to support Masry's claims.

After receiving complaints about Beverly's oil installation, the region's air-quality agency investigated Venoco and in 2003 issued three Notices of Violation regarding the operation of the drilling island. The penalty settlement included requirements that Venoco maintain continuous air quality monitoring at the high school, and prevent any oilfield gas (which is primarily methane gas) from being released into the atmosphere.

On December 12, 2006, the first 12 plaintiffs (of over 1000 total) were dismissed on summary judgment because there was no indication that the contaminant (benzene) caused the diseases involved and the concentrations were hundreds to thousands of times lower than levels associated with any risk. In the fall of 2007, the plaintiffs agreed to pay the School District and the City up to $450,000 for expenses from the lawsuits.

In June 2004 Beverly Hills Courier Editor Norma Zager was named "Journalist of the Year" in the Los Angeles Press Club's Southern California Journalism Awards competition for her coverage of the Erin Brockovich-Ed Masry lawsuit.

In 2017, Venoco filed bankruptcy and was liquidated. By January 2021 the oil wells were plugged and capped, and the derricks had been demolished.

== Student life ==
=== In book ===
The 1988 non-fiction book Hard Lessons by Michael Leahy documents the life of six Beverly seniors for a full school year. In 1984, Beverly had a 100% graduation rate but three students committed suicide. These suicides piqued Leahy's interest in Beverly, and in 1985 he began writing Hard Lessons.

Leahy had heard many stories about Beverly having intense academic pressure, substance abuse, and being a "den of hedonism." However, after speaking to Beverly students he concluded that sex and drug abuse were neither higher nor lower than at other local high schools. Beverly's social attitudes and morals were also nearly identical to these schools. Leahy did note that Beverly's academic pressure was unusually high which led to cheating and high anxiety amongst students.

=== KBEV Channel 6 TV ===
Since 1969, KBEV Channel 6 is a student-run television channel at BHHS that began on Theta Cable as part of the public, educational, and government access (PEG) channels requirements for cable companies (free access by public-access television, education-access television and government-access television (GATV) entities in the community). KBEV airs a variety of programs, including the longest-running high school news program in the country, The Norman Newservice (now The Norman News). KBEV has interviewed celebrities, alumni, and other prominent guests, such as Ronald Reagan, in the past.

=== Athletics ===
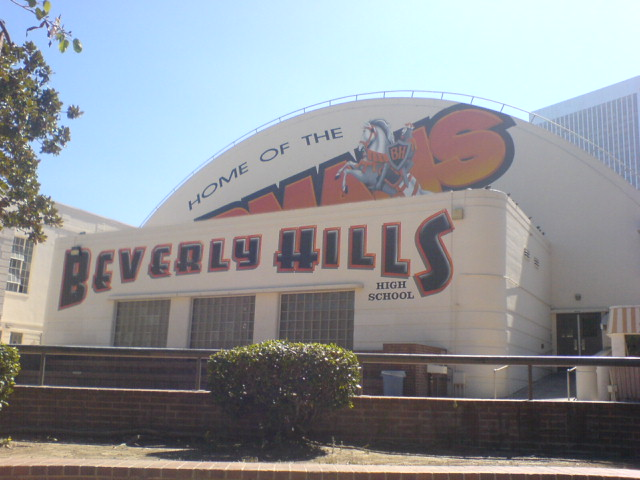
Beverly Hills High School Gym

=== Performing arts ===
Beverly Hills High School has a Performing Arts Department that historically attracts casting directors, writers, agents, and producers to attend performances and to visit classes to speak with the students.

The lead drama teacher from 1964 to 1985 and department chair was the late John Ingle. After his retirement from teaching high school, Ingle had a prolific career as a soap opera and commercial actor, most notably as scheming patriarch Edward Quartermaine. Ingle made a last appearance in the role on General Hospital just days before his death in 2012.

The BHHS marching band has been selected to perform at Disneyland several times in its history. The marching band has also been invited to The London New Year’s Day Parade twice in its history, most recently in 2016.

BHHS has a competitive Winter Drumline, which as of June 2012 was in its second competitive season. They compete in the SCPA and WGI circuits. The BHHS Drumline has performed such shows as "A Tour of Technology: The Inner-Workings of a Computer" and "Censor State: The State, The Conceded, The Resistance".

After Holmes retired in 1975, his former student, the late Joel D. Pressman '67, became the director of the Madrigal Singers until his death in 2013. Pressman is also a member of the school's Alumni Hall of Fame.

The Dance Company holds its annual show in January. In 2007, the Dance Company traveled to its sister school in Cannes, France, where they were invited to perform. BHHS also has a hip-hop group, AP Posse, which performs in Dance Company showcases. BHHS Dance Company is currently run by Dana Findley, and was run by Janet Roston prior to that. In BHHS Dance Company showcases, student choreographed work is exhibited, as well as work by guest choreographers. Some examples of guest choreographers in recent years include Sam Allen, Victoria George (dance teacher at Beverly Vista Middle School), Neaz Kohani and Janet Roston.

=== Robotics team ===
The Beverly Hills High School FIRST Robotics Competition team, MorTorq – Team 1515 was founded in 2004. MorTorq won the Chairman’s Award (the most prestigious award the business team can receive) in 2010, 2013, and 2019 at the Los Angeles Regional competition, and in 2014 at the Las Vegas Regional competition. The team has won two Regional events: the Oregon Regional in 2010, and the Los Angeles Regional in 2015. MorTorq has attended the FIRST Championship in 2004, 2010, 2013, 2014, 2015, 2018, and 2019. 2019 was the first time the team was selected as a member of an alliance in Championship playoffs.

== In popular culture ==
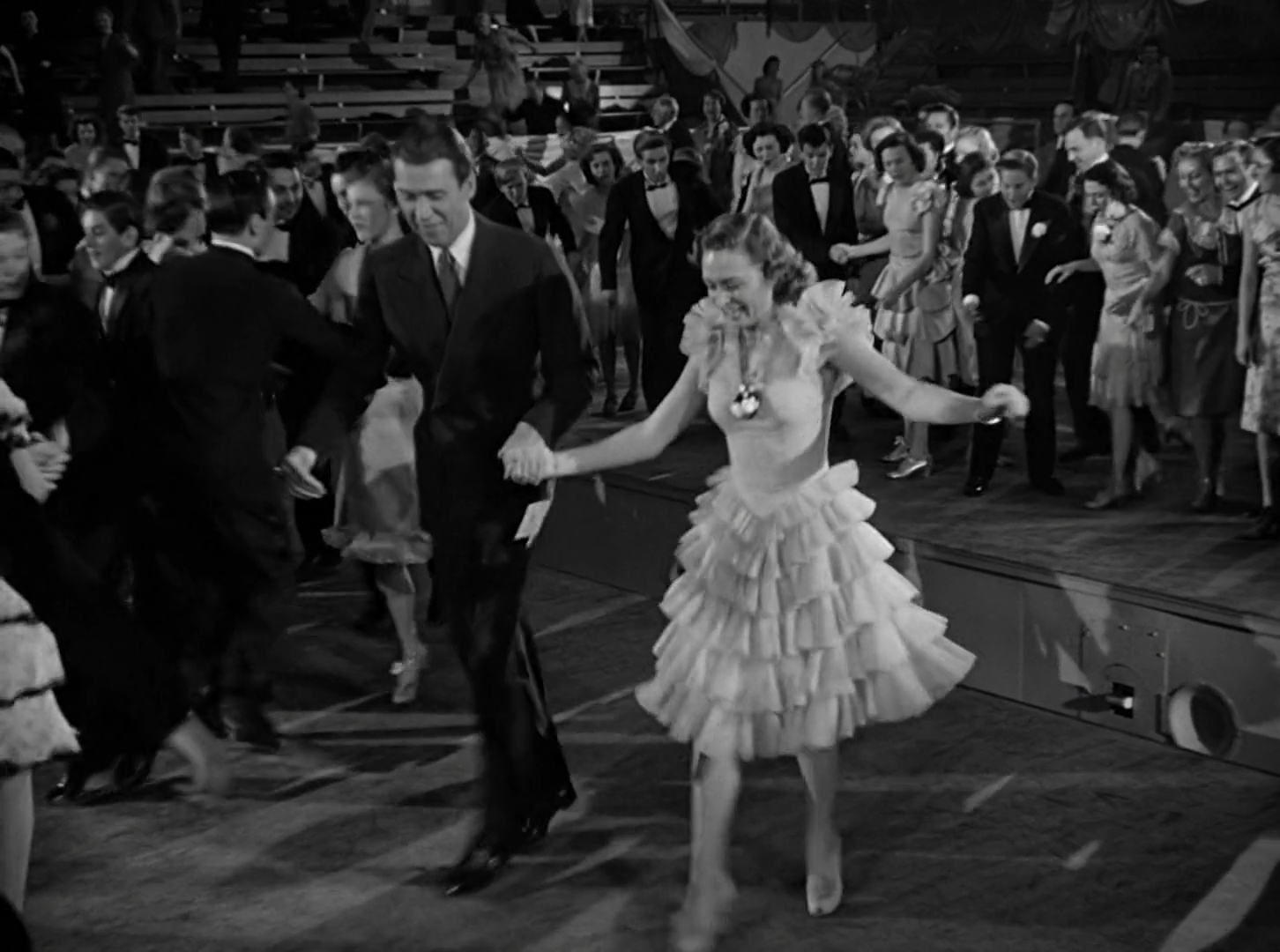
In the 1946 film It's a Wonderful Life, George (James Stewart) and Mary (Donna Reed) are dancing at the Bedford Falls High graduation party, in reality the gym of Beverly Hills High School.

Beverly Hills High School has been featured in many films and TV shows, either as part of the plot or as a filming location, including Clueless, Real Women Have Curves, Whatever It Takes, The Bachelor and the Bobby-Soxer, and It's a Wonderful Life. A major scene of It's a Wonderful Life was filmed in Beverly's unique "Swim Gym," perhaps the only gymnasium that has a basketball court that can split open to reveal a recreational-sized, 25-yard (23 m) swimming pool.

When Giants Collide is a 2007 documentary about the school's wrestling program, directed and produced by Christina Fulton.

== Notable alumni ==
- Jack Abramoff – American lobbyist (born 1959)
- David Ascalon – American sculptor (born 1945)
- Jon Robin Baitz – American dramatist
- Al Barry – American football player (born 1930)
- Julie Bennett – American actress (1932–2020)
- Corbin Bernsen – American actor and director (born 1954)
- Albert Brooks – American actor, comedian, director, and screenwriter (born 1947)
- Steve Burton (actor) – American actor (born 1970)
- Nicolas Cage – American actor (born 1964)
- Shaun Cassidy – American singer, actor, producer and writer (born 1958)
- Richard Chamberlain – American actor and singer (1934–2025)
- Jackie Cooper – American actor and director (1922–2011)
- Rick Cunningham (American football) – American gridiron football player (born 1967)
- Richard Dreyfuss – American actor (born 1947)
- Nora Ephron – American writer and filmmaker (1941–2012)
- Miguel Ferrer – actor(1955-2017)
- Carrie Fisher – American actress and writer (1956–2016)
- Herbert Flam – American tennis player
- Michèle Flournoy – American defense policy advisor
- Gina Gershon – American actress and singer (born 1962)
- Julie Kavner – Actress Voice Of Marge Simpson (Born 1950)
- Angelina Jolie – American actress (born 1975)
- Ronnie Knox – American gridiron football player (1935–1992)
- Ian Kochinski (aka Vaush – American political YouTuber and livestreamer (born 1994))
- Lenny Kravitz – American rock musician (born 1964)
- Monica Lewinsky – American activist (born 1973)
- Erik Menendez – American murderer (born 1970)
- Frank Morriss – American film editor (1927–2013)
- Camila Morrone – American actress (born 1997)
- Leland Moss – American theatre director (1948–1990)
- Spencer Paysinger – American football player (born 1988)
- Mason Porter – American mathematician
- Jim Powers (American football) – American football player (1928–2013)
- André Previn – American musician (1929–2019)
- Rob Reiner – American filmmaker and actor (1947–2025) son of Carl Reiner
- Peter Schiff – American stock broker, radio personality, and author (born 1963)
- David Schwimmer – American actor (born 1966)
- Robert B. Sherman – American songwriter (1925–2012)
- Sanford C. Sigoloff – American businessman and philanthropist (1930 –2011)
- Bahar Soomekh – American actress
- Tracy Tormé – American screenwriter (1959–2024)
- Edward Tufte – American statistician (born 1942)
- Jean Vander Pyl – American voice actress (1919–1999)
- Lawrence Vavra – American live events conglomerate
- Betty White – American actress and comedian (1922–2021)
- Frank Wilkinson – American civil liberties activist (1914–2006)
- James Yenbamroong
- Daniel Yergin – American business executive and author
