= The Lost Boys (franchise) =

Horror comedy film franchise

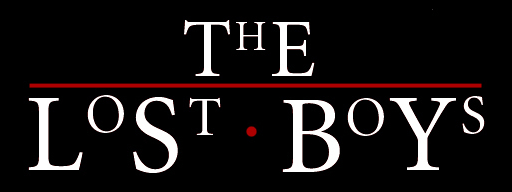
- Franchise logo
- Original work: The Lost Boys (1987)
- Owners: Warner Bros. Entertainment (Skydance)
- Years: 1987–present

Print publications
- Novel: Novels
- Comics: Comics

Films and television
- Film: Films
- Television series: Television series

Audio
- Soundtrack: Music

Miscellaneous
- Toy: Merchandise

The Lost Boys is an American horror comedy film franchise that began with the 1987 Warner Bros. film The Lost Boys, written by Janice Fischer, James Jeremias, and Jeffrey Boam. The film was directed by Joel Schumacher and produced by Harvey Bernhard. Starring Corey Haim, Jason Patric, Kiefer Sutherland, Jami Gertz, Corey Feldman, Dianne Wiest, Edward Herrmann, Alex Winter, Jamison Newlander, and Barnard Hughes, the story revolves around two brothers who move to a new town and end up fighting a gang of young vampires. The film was followed by two direct-to-DVD sequels, Lost Boys: The Tribe (2008) and Lost Boys: The Thirst (2010).

A novelization of the first film was published in the same year as the film's release. A monthly comic book miniseries, Lost Boys: Reign of Frogs, was also produced in 2008 with the story serving as a lead-in to the first film sequel, Lost Boys: The Tribe. A film reboot has been in development since 2021.

== Media ==
=== Films ===
Film	Director	Writer(s)	Producer(s)	Composer(s)	Cinematographer(s)	Editor(s)	Production companies	Distributor(s)	Running time
The Lost Boys (1987)	Joel Schumacher	Janice Fischer, James Jeremias and Jeffrey Boam	Harvey Bernhard	Thomas Newman	Michael Chapman	Robert Brown	Richard Donner Production	Warner Bros. Pictures	97 minutes
Lost Boys: The Tribe (2008)	P. J. Pesce	Hans Rodionoff	Basil Iwanyk and Phillip B. Goldfine	Nathan Barr	Barry Donlevy	Amanda I. Kitpaul	Thunder Road Pictures and Hollywood Media Bridge	Warner Premiere	93 minutes
Lost Boys: The Thirst (2010)	Dario Piana	Evan Charnov and Hans Rodionoff	Basil Iwanyk, Phillip B. Goldfine and David Wicht	Elia Cmiral	Stefano Morcaldo	Tony Solomons	Thunder Road Pictures, Hollywood Media Bridge, Film Afrika and ApolloMovie	Warner Premiere	81 minutes

The original The Lost Boys was released in 1987 and starred Jason Patric, Corey Haim, Kiefer Sutherland, Jami Gertz, Corey Feldman, Dianne Wiest, Edward Herrmann, Alex Winter, Jamison Newlander, and Barnard Hughes. A direct-to-DVD sequel, Lost Boys: The Tribe, was released in 2008. Corey Feldman returned as Edgar Frog, with a cameo by Corey Haim as Sam Emerson. Kiefer Sutherland's half-brother Angus Sutherland plays the lead vampire. A third film entitled Lost Boys: The Thirst, with Feldman serving as an executive producer in addition to playing Edgar Frog, and Newlander returning as Alan Frog was released on DVD in 2010.

After the first film's initial release there were plans to make a sequel named The Lost Girls just two years after with David returning as the villain but the plans never came to fruition. Scripts for this and other sequels circulated, and the original film's director, Joel Schumacher, made several attempts at a sequel during the 1990s. There were also plans for a fourth film after the release of the third film but was cancelled after the folding of its production company.

A modern-day reboot of the franchise is in development since September 2021, with Noah Jupe and Jaeden Martell starring as the leads, Randy McKinnon penning the script, and Jonathan Entwistle as the director.

=== Novels ===
The original film was novelized by Craig Shaw Gardner. It was released in paperback by Berkley Publishing and is 220 pages long.

=== Comic books ===
In 2008, a four-issue comic book mini-series named Lost Boys: Reign of Frogs was released from May to August. It was published by Wildstorm and the story is set between The Lost Boys and Lost Boys: The Tribe. The plot revolves around the Frog brothers in their further adventures hunting vampires. A second comic series was named simply The Lost Boys was released in October 2016 by Vertigo, this too is a miniseries, where Michael, Sam and the Frog Brothers must protect Star from her sisters, the Blood Belles.

=== TV pilots ===
In August 2016, a television adaptation of The Lost Boys was revealed to be in the works at The CW, to be developed by writer Rob Thomas in association with Gulfstream Television and Warner Bros. Television (WBTV). In addition to writing, Thomas was to executive produce the project via Spondoolie Productions, alongside his frequent collaborators Danielle Stokdyk and Dan Etheridge, as well as Gulfstream's Mike Karz and Bill Bindley. Juliana Janes, the head of Gulfstream Television, was instrumental in putting the project together and oversaw the project for the company. Gulfstream originally pitched the idea to remake The Lost Boys as a television series through the company's overall deal with WBTV. Also under an overall deal with WBTV, Thomas later boarded the project with a new take on the film and, with two networks pursuing, Thomas' pitch landed at The CW.

A re-imagining of the original film, the series was imagined as a seven-season anthology-style story spanning 70 years, with each season chronicling a decade. The first season was to be set in San Francisco during the Summer of Love in 1967. The series' setting, antagonists, human characters, and story would change each season, with only the titular vampires remaining the same as the series was to explore what it really means to be immortal. While the project did not go to pilot during the 2016-17 development season, the network remained invested in the property. As Thomas became preoccupied with his work on his Veronica Mars revival, Heather Mitchell joined The Lost Boys as a writer and executive producer to redevelop the project, which landed a pilot order in January 2019. The new logline for the series read:

"Welcome to sunny seaside Santa Carla, home to a beautiful boardwalk, all the cotton candy you can eat…and a secret underworld of vampires. After the sudden death of their father, two brothers move to Santa Carla with their mother, who hopes to start anew in the town where she grew up. But the brothers find themselves drawn deeper and deeper into the seductive world of Santa Carla's eternally beautiful and youthful undead".

In February, Catherine Hardwicke was hired to direct the pilot episode and two of the three lead roles had been cast with Tyler Posey as Michael Emerson, one of the brothers, and Kiele Sanchez as their mother, Lucy Emerson. Medalion Rahimi and Dakota Shapiro were additionally announced in main roles as Stella and David, respectively. Posey, Sanchez, and Shapiro took on roles that were previously played by Jason Patric, Dianne Wiest, and Kiefer Sutherland in the original film, while Rahimi's Stella is a version of the Star character played by Jami Gertz. Casting continued with Sarah Hay, Cheyenne Haynes, and Haley Tju added as series regulars. Hay was cast as Mollie, a vampire turned by David who has become his rival for leadership of the vampire gang. Meanwhile, Haynes and Tju were tapped to portray the Frog Sisters, Liza and Cassie, respectively. The characters are a gender-flipped version of the Frog Brothers, Edgar and Alan Frog, played by Corey Feldman and Jamison Newlander, respectively, in the original film. In March, Rio Mangini joined the main cast as Sam Emerson, one of the lead brothers, alongside Del Zamora as Frank Garcia, Lucy's father.

After The CW passed on the pilot in May, once again deciding to retool the project though this time off-cycle, Warner Bros. Television released the entire cast of the pilot the following month with the exception of Rahimi and Shapiro, whose options were extended. The duo were set to co-star in the new, reworked pilot, which was scheduled to film by the end of 2019. The second pilot began filming but was affected by the 2019 COVID-19 pandemic. Despite this the pilot was pretty much finished, but was also not accepted on 15 May 2020. Nonetheless, CW continued to emphasize the project as a passion project. In January 2021, the latest pilot was stated to still be in consideration, but in September, it was officially confirmed that The CW would not move forward with the project.

=== Stage ===
A musical adaption began development in 2017. In 2020 composer Gerard McMahon stated that the musical was almost done, and was scheduled to premiere in 2022. The musical had its official opening on April 26, 2026, after preview performances from March 27, 2026, at the Palace Theatre. Broadway veteran Caissie Levy was originally cast as matriarch Lucy Emerson, but realized she could not commit to the rigorous schedule and the Ragtime extension. She stepped away from the role to focus on her family. Former Wicked and Hell's Kitchen star Shoshana Bean was then announced as her replacement prior to previews, and continues in the role now that the show has opened.

Cast and characters in The Lost Boys (Musical)

Character(s)	Broadway
Character(s)	2026
Michael Emerson	LJ Benet
Lucy Emerson	Shoshana Bean
David	Ali Louis Bourzgui
Sam Emerson	Benjamin Pajak
Star	Maria Wirries
Max	Paul Alexander Nolan
Alan Frog	Jennifer Duka
Edgar Frog	Miguel Gil
Marko	Brian Flores
Dwayne	Sean Grandillo
Paul	Dean Maupin

== Cast ==
List indicators

This section includes characters who will appear or have appeared in more than two films in the series.

- An empty grey cell indicates the character was not in the film, or that the character's official presence has not yet been confirmed.
- ^{A} indicates an appearance through archival footage or audio.
- ^{C} indicates a cameo role.
- ^{E} indicates an appearance not included in the theatrical cut.
- ^{O} indicates an older version of the character.
- ^{P} indicates an appearance in onscreen photographs.
- ^{U} indicates an uncredited appearance.
- ^{V} indicates a voice-only role.
- ^{Y} indicates a younger version of the character.

Characters	Films			Pilot
Characters	The Lost Boys	Lost Boys: The Tribe	Lost Boys: The Thirst	The Lost Boys
Characters	1987	2008	2010	2019
Edgar Frog	Corey Feldman	Corey Feldman	Corey Feldman	
Alan Frog	Jamison Newlander	Jamison Newlander^{E}	Jamison Newlander	
Sam Emerson	Corey Haim	Corey Haim^{C}	Corey Haim^{U}^{Y}^{A}	Rio Mangini
Michael Emerson	Jason Patric	Mentioned	Mentioned	Tyler Posey
Star	Jami Gertz	Mentioned	Mentioned	
David	Kiefer Sutherland			Dakota Shapiro
Lucy Emerson	Dianne Wiest			Kiele Sanchez
Chris Emerson		Tad Hilgenbrink		
Nicole Emerson		Autumn Reeser		
Shane Powers		Angus Sutherland		
Zoe			Casey B. Dolan	
Gwen Lieber			Tanit Phoenix	
DJ X			Seb Castang	
Peter			Felix Mosse	

== Music ==
The score for the original film was composed by Thomas Newman. The theme song, "Cry Little Sister", was originally recorded by Gerard McMahon (under his pseudonym Gerard McMann) for the soundtrack. In the film's sequel, "Cry Little Sister" was covered by a Seattle-based rock band, Aiden. Lou Gramm, lead singer of Foreigner recorded the song "Lost in the Shadows" for the soundtrack, along with a video which featured clips from the film. The soundtrack also featured several popular songs.

The score for the second film was composed by Nathan Barr. A soundtrack of songs by various artists was released by Adrenaline Records on July 22, 2008. The album includes a cover version of "Cry Little Sister" by Aiden.

The music for the third film was composed by Elia Cmíral.

== Merchandise ==
The vampire David has been produced as an action figure by the National Entertainment Collectibles Association as part of their Cult Classics Movie Figures. Michael also received a figure.

== See also ==
- Vampire films
