= Michael Emerson (character) =

Fictional character and main protagonist of the 1987 film The Lost Boys

- The Lost Boys character
- Jason Patric as Michael Emerson in The Lost Boys
- First appearance: The Lost Boys
- Created by: Janice Fischer; James Jeremias
- Portrayed by: Jason Patric (film); LJ Benet (original musical cast)

In-universe information
- Occupation: Half-vampire
- Family: Lucy Emerson (mother); Sam Emerson (brother); Chris Emerson (cousin; film sequel only); Nicole Emerson (cousin; film sequel only)

Michael Emerson is a fictional character and protagonist of the 1987 film The Lost Boys portrayed by Jason Patric. Michael moves to Santa Carla, California from Phoenix, Arizona with his mother Lucy and brother Sam. During his time in Santa Carla, he becomes involved with a biker gang who are revealed to be vampires and is turned by their charismatic leader, David.

== Fictional character biography ==
Michael Emerson is the son of Lucy Emerson (Dianne Wiest) and the older brother to Sam (Corey Haim). He is seen as being a relatively quiet teenager interested in fitness and motorcycles. He moves from his hometown of Phoenix, Arizona to Santa Carla, California after his mother's divorce. While there, Michael becomes infatuated with a girl named Star (Jami Gertz), who appears to be in a relationship with David (Kiefer Sutherland). David challenges Michael to a deadly motorcycle race, which Michael loses, and invites him back to their hangout. While at their hangout, David taunts Michael before eventually offering him wine, which was really David's blood, turning him into a half-vampire. David and his gang hang off of the underside of an elevated train before each individually falling off. Eventually, Michael loses his grip and falls, before waking up in his own bed with a new ear piercing.

Michael's new status as a half-vampires eventually manifests itself when he begins reacting negatively to sunlight, constantly wearing sunglasses, and one night begins flying around the house involuntarily. He confides in his brother Sam to help him, as Sam had recently befriended self-proclaimed vampire hunters Edgar and Alan Frog (Corey Feldman and Jamison Newlander). Michael has another encounter with David where David attempts to persuade Michael into killing. Michael instead watches in horror and fear as David and his gang massacre a group of Surf Nazis. Michael returns home where he comes across Star, who reveals that she too is a half-vampire and Michael was intended to be her first victim, which would have turned her into a fully-fledged vampire. After this, Michael leads Sam, Edgar and Alan to David's lair, where they rescue Star and another half-vampire, Laddie (Chance Michael Corbitt), and end up successfully killing one vampire, Marko (Alex Winter). The group barely escape with their lives and only do so because it is still daytime and the vampires cannot follow them into the sunlight.

That evening, Michael, Sam, Edgar and Alan prepare to defend themselves, Star and Laddie inside the Emerson house from David and the other two remaining vampires, Paul and Dwayne (Brooke McCarter and Billy Wirth). This results in the deaths of the other two vampires, leading to a final confrontation between Michael and David, which ends with Michael impaling David on a set of deer antlers. After killing David, Michael and Star notice that their vampiric abilities are still present. It is then revealed that Max (Edward Herrmann), a seemingly innocent video store owner who was romantically interested in Lucy, is the true head vampire who had David turn Michael in hopes of getting Lucy to become a mother to the vampires. Michael's grandfather (Barnard Hughes) then stakes Max with his tractor, freeing Michael, Star and Laddie from their vampirism.

== Other appearances ==
=== Film ===
- Jason Patric did not return for the straight to DVD sequels, Lost Boys: The Tribe and Lost Boys: The Thirst. Michael is referenced in Lost Boys: The Thirst by Edgar Frog, stating that he and Star are not on speaking terms with the Frog Brothers due to their hand in the death of his brother Sam Emerson.

=== Television ===
- In 2019, The CW began work on a reboot television series based on The Lost Boys. Michael was set to appear, this time played by Tyler Posey and the series would follow him and his brother Sam (played by Rio Mangini) moving to their mother's childhood home Santa Carla after the sudden death of their father. A pilot was filmed however the project was not picked up. In 2020, development of the project continued; however, Michael was written out and replaced by the character Garrett, played by Branden Cook. This new series synopsis removed references to the original film such as the seaside town name of Santa Carla and the lead vampire being David. Again, a pilot was filmed but the series was not picked up.

=== Literature ===
- Michael appears in the comic book series Lost Boys: Reign of Frogs which is intended to be a prelude to Lost Boys: The Tribe. Here, Michael and Star are being hunted by a resurrected David in revenge for killing his brothers.
- Michael reappears in the comic book sequel The Lost Boys which disregards the straight-to-DVD sequels and Reign of Frogs as canon. Instead, it picks up directly after the first film and follows Michael protecting Star from her vampiric sisters - The Blood Belles.

=== Stage ===
- In 2017, it was announced that a musical adaptation of the original movie was in production. On October 8, 2025, it was announced that LJ Benet would be originating the role of Michael Emerson. The Lost Boys: A New Musical opened at the Palace Theatre on Broadway on April 26, 2026.

== Development ==
In the original screenplay of the film, written by James Jeremias and Janice Fischer, the story was originally meant to be modelled after initial director Richard Donner's recent hit, The Goonies. This was later changed when Joel Schumacher and Jeffrey Boam came aboard. According to Kiefer Sutherland, Jason Patric had a hand in changing the film's tone. Sutherland elaborated on this at a convention stating: "Jason had a large part to do with that, [he] was really instrumental in kind of, changing, working with Joel on the script, sometimes in a nice way, sometimes not so nice." Ben Stiller had also auditioned for a role in the movie, but while Stiller hasn't explicitly stated which role, many fans have been led to believe that Stiller was up for the role of Michael, before it went to Jason Patric, who had initially turned the role down. Patric was cast early on in production, and eventually convinced Schumacher to cast Jami Gertz as Star, having worked together previously in Solarbabies.

== Reception ==
While not much is known about his personality, Michael's encounters with David and the character's restrained and vulnerable portrayal by Jason Patric were highly praised. The dynamic and tension between actors Jason Patric and Kiefer Sutherland were also a point of critical acclaim. The character has also been interpreted to have carried homoerotic themes throughout the screenplay, due to the attraction he carried toward David and the vampire gang. Kiefer Sutherland, who played David, has commented on the possible homoeroticism in the film, describing an encounter between David and Michael as "sensual". Cat LaFuente from The List commented on the undertones stating, "Then there are the vampire boys, who all sleep in the same room and do everything together. Could it be, perhaps, that their leather-forward outfits hint at an interest in the underground gay culture of the 1980s? They all drank David's bodily fluids, after all, so it's not out of the realm of possibility. And why are none of them hooking up with Star, the only woman who's ever around? That would certainly explain the dramatic tension between David and Michael." Some viewers have interpreted that the undertones included in the film were a result of director Joel Schumacher, who is an openly gay man in real life.

== In popular culture ==
The character has been referenced multiple times in popular culture. The scene in the film featuring the character's initiation by David where he turns noodles into worms was parodied in the Taika Waititi's 2014 parody film What We Do In The Shadows. The character has also gotten a "Funko Pop!" figurine based on the character, as well as an action figure by the National Entertainment Collectables Association. The character's notability has also been recognised as one of the most memorable things from the film, with some fans even mocking the fact that the character's name is said a grand total of 114 times throughout the film's 98 minute runtime. Michael also re-appears in the 2016 The Lost Boys sequel comic series of the same name published by Vertigo Comics.

=== Comparisons to Billy Hargrove from Stranger Things ===
There are many references and homages to Michael Emerson throughout the hit Netflix streaming show Stranger Things through the character of Billy Hargrove, played by Australian actor Dacre Montgomery. The character was modelled after Jason Patric's look in the film, to the extent of adopting the lone earring Michael wore in the film. Hargrove has also been noted for the similarity between him and Michael, both being new punk kids in a small town, as well as Billy's struggle not to become consumed by The Mind Flayer, noting similarities between Michael's fight against his newly discovered vampirism. Ironically, Billy Hargrove has also been compared to the work of Kiefer Sutherland as well, notably the characters of David and Ace Merrill from Stand by Me. In the comparisons to David, the character of Steve Harrington (portrayed by Joe Keery) is instead used as the example of Michael, due in parts to Billy's attitude and Steve's reluctance to give in to Billy. The adversary relationship between Billy and Steve played a prominent role in the show's second season, which led to many fans noticing the similarities between the relationship of David and Michael to that of Billy and Steve.
