= David (The Lost Boys) =

- The Lost Boys character
- Kiefer Sutherland as David
- First appearance: The Lost Boys
- Created by: Janice Fischer; James Jeremias
- Portrayed by: Kiefer Sutherland (film); Ali Louis Bourzgui (original musical cast)

In-universe information
- Occupation: Vampire

David is a fictional character from the 1987 film The Lost Boys portrayed by Kiefer Sutherland. In the film David is the head of a gang of vampires in the fictional town of Santa Carla.

The character and Sutherland's performance were well received upon the film's release, and David has gone on to become regarded as an iconic villain in popular culture, having inspired the depiction of vampires both in style as well as characterization since. Analysis of his personality and psychology range from focus on his status as an eternal youth, gang leader, and murderer, and his implied homoerotic tendencies.

== Appearances ==
=== Film ===
David is the head of a gang of vampires in the fictional town of Santa Carla. Max, the head vampire of Santa Carla, tries to find a "mother" for David and the rest of the gang in order to curb their wayward behavior.

Sutherland has stated that David's hairstyle was inspired by British punk rock icon Billy Idol.

=== Literature ===
- David appears in the same role in the 1980s novelization of the film.
- David appears in the comic Lost Boys: Reign of Frogs, seeking revenge on the Emerson brothers for murdering his family. It is also established that David is the vampire who turned Shane Powers, the head vampire of The Tribe.
- David re-appears in 2016's The Lost Boys, which disregards Reign of Frogs and the straight-to-dvd sequels as canon. Once again, it is revealed he survived his encounter with the Emerson brothers and seeks out revenge on the family.

=== Television ===
In 2020, it was announced that a television series based on the character and the rest of the vampire gang is in production at The CW, focusing on the gang of vampires at different points in history. Dakota Shapiro was cast in the role for the first pilot, but was replaced with Lincoln Younes and the character renamed "Benjamin" for the second pilot.

=== Stage ===
In 2017, it was announced that a musical adaptation of the original movie was in production. On October 8, 2025, it was announced that Ali Louis Bourzgui would be originating the role of David. The Lost Boys: A New Musical opened at the Palace Theatre on Broadway on April 26, 2026, with Bourzgui's performance as David being well-received by critics. For his portrayal, Bourzgui won the Tony Award for Best Featured Actor in a Musical.

== Fictional character biography ==
Not much is known about David's life before becoming a vampire. He was sired by Max and went on to lead his own gang of subordinates (Paul, Dwayne, and Marko) who were also sired by Max. They take up residence in the underground remnants of a long-destroyed luxury hotel. The audience is introduced to David through the eyes of Michael Emerson, and Michael's fascination with a half-vampire named Star, whom David appears to be in a relationship with. Michael is provoked by David into participating in a dangerous motorcycle race. Michael is then lured back to David's lair where he undergoes an initiation, unknowingly drinks blood, and becomes a half-vampire.

David takes Michael to a group of Surf Nazis at a bonfire, hoping to prompt him into killing. Michael however returns home to his brother, Sam, who has become friends with a pair of vampire hunters, Edgar and Alan Frog. Michael leads Sam, Edgar, and Alan to the vampire lair during the daytime while they are sleeping, and kill Marko. The group escapes.

The vampires attack the vampire hunters at Sam's house, leading to the deaths of Paul and Dwayne. David and Michael face off, which ends with David being impaled on antlers.

== Planned prequel and sequel ==
"The Lost Boys: The Beginning" was a proposed prequel to the 1987 film The Lost Boys. Set in 1906 San Francisco, the story aimed to explore the origins of David and his gang, detailing how they became vampires. The script was penned by Eric Red, known for "Near Dark," and was commissioned by Warner Bros. following the original film’s success.

Despite the intriguing premise, the project faced several challenges. Director Joel Schumacher, who helmed the original film, eventually lost interest in the prequel concept and shifted focus to a potential sequel titled "The Lost Girls," which also failed to materialize. Consequently, "The Lost Boys: The Beginning" remained unproduced, leaving fans to speculate about the untold backstory of the iconic characters.

After the success of "The Lost Boys" in 1987, director Joel Schumacher proposed a sequel titled “The Lost Girls" This concept aimed to introduce a female vampire gang, potentially featuring actresses like Drew Barrymore and Rosanna Arquette. Despite Schumacher's enthusiasm, the studio did not pursue this project, and it remained unproduced.

David, portrayed by Kiefer Sutherland, was intended to return in the proposed sequel "The Lost Girls." In the original 1987 film "The Lost Boys," David’s death was left ambiguous; unlike other vampires, his body remained intact after being impaled, suggesting a potential return. Director Joel Schumacher envisioned "The Lost Girls" as a sequel featuring a female vampire gang, with David reappearing as a master vampire. However, this project never materialized.

In the 1990s, Schumacher made several attempts to develop a sequel, including the "Lost Girls" concept, but none came to fruition. Instead, the franchise continued with direct-to-DVD releases: "Lost Boys: The Tribe" in 2008 and "Lost Boys: The Thirst" in 2010. These sequels did not involve Schumacher and received negative reviews.

== Reception ==
Kerrang! described David's appearance as stereotypical of late-1980s goth. Film critic Colin Houlson stated that Sutherland "is moody and seductively scary as David". Tori Danielle wrote in iHorror that David is both edgy and sympathetic, since the essential evils he commits are forced on him by his nature.

== Analysis ==
Jeffrey Weinstock expressed in his book The Vampire Film: Undead Cinema that David (much like many male vampire characters) is a gender stereotype of a male, always performing and trying to "pass" as a human, and in David's case almost to the point of parody.

=== Character analysis in unproduced media ===
In the unproduced prequel script Lost Boys: The Beginning, written by Eric Red, the characterisation of David diverges significantly from his antagonistic portrayal in the original 1987 film. While the theatrical release presents David as a static, chaotic, and remorseless predator, Red's screenplay constructs a more sympathetic, protective, and ethically conflicted foundation for the character during his human life.

As a human street thief in 1906 San Francisco, David is established as the paternalistic leader of his gang, assuming personal responsibility for the survival and well-being of Marko, Paul, and Dwayne. Unlike the predatory instincts he exhibits as a vampire, the human David operates under a strict moral code, enforces a rule of "ethical pickpocketing," and explicitly forbids his crew from stealing from impoverished families. His tragic romance with the exiled noble Anastasia Rostov further highlights his vulnerability and desire for a better life, as he attempts to reform his criminal lifestyle to conform to higher societal standards to impress her. Analysts note that this unrealised narrative arc frames David's eventual transformation into a vampire not as an inherent embrace of evil, but as the tragic corruption of a fiercely loyal protector who was broken by loss and subsequently stripped of his humanity by Count Dracula.

=== Blended families and manipulation ===
While David acts as the primary antagonist for much of the film, critical analysis highlights that his actions are dictated by the master plan of the head vampire, Max. Max deliberately targets Lucy Emerson by exploiting her protective maternal instincts, using David and the pack to target her sons, Michael and Sam, to force her into a domestic, "blended" vampire family.

David's initial intention was not to induct Michael, but rather to use him as a sacrificial "first kill" to complete Star's transformation; plans only shifted into a family recruitment effort under Max's explicit orders. This is highlighted when Star confesses to Michael that he was intended to be her target because "that's what David wanted," proving David's initial plans were subverted by Max's domestic agenda.

=== Narrative analysis and family dynamics ===
While much of the film's academic analysis focuses on its queer coding and homoerotic subtext, other critics highlight that the text explicitly frames the vampire coven's motivations around literal family manipulation and predatory domesticity.

From this perspective, David's pursuit of Michael is not purely a predatory seduction, but rather an execution of the head vampire Max's grander scheme to trap Michael's mother, Lucy, into a manufactured "blended family." This is supported by the revelation that David originally intended for Michael to be a sacrificial "first kill" for Star to complete her transformation, rather than a recruit for the pack; plans only changed to accommodate Max's domestic agenda. This shift in motive is verified when Star warns Michael that he was only supposed to be her target because "that's what David wanted."

=== Counter-readings and heteronormative dynamics ===
While scholarly consensus frequently highlights the film's pervasive homoerotic and queer subtext, alternative textual analyses point to a competing domestic framework driven by the overarching plot. In this view, David's pursuit of Michael is not strictly driven by homoerotic desire, but rather functions as an extension of the head vampire Max's heteronormative scheme to build a traditional "blended family" by targeting Lucy Emerson through her children.

This reading emphasizes that David's primary objective was initially violent rather than seductive; he intended for Michael to serve as a sacrificial "first kill" to finalise Star's vampire transformation. This sequence of motivations is reinforced on-screen when Star warns Michael that his death "was what David wanted," indicating that the subsequent push to induct Michael into the vampire gang was a shift forced by Max's domestic agenda, rather than David's independent volition.

=== Homoerotic interpretation ===
David, and particularly his interactions with the character Michael, has been read as homoerotic. Sutherland has nodded to these themes, remarking that the "whole scene where I catch [Michael] in the fog coming off the bridge ... I mean, it's a very sensual moment!" Harry Benshoff in his book Monsters in the Closet: Homosexuality and the Horror Film states that with his bleach-blond hair, stubble, earrings and leather attire David appears as a gay pin-up model. He interprets the film as the story of the "normal" teen Michael being seduced by David's lifestyle. Psychoanalyst Trevor C. Pederson describes David's attempts at recruiting Michael as "obsessive", noting that David even requests that Michael join him even after Michael and his friends have killed all of David's fellow vampires.

=== Interpretation of the final confrontation ===
Scholars and psychoanalysts have debated David's motivations during his final battle with Michael. Psychoanalyst Trevor C. Pederson describes David's persistent attempts at recruiting Michael as "obsessive", arguing that David continues to request that Michael join the pack even after Michael and the Frog brothers have successfully killed the rest of the coven.

However, narrative commentary notes that this "obsessive" push may stem from dramatic irony rather than a refusal to accept his pack's demise; within the scene's sequence, David shows no objective awareness that the other vampires have been killed when he offers his ultimatum. This lack of awareness is supported by his dialogue during the struggle, where he states, "I don't want to kill you, Michael. Join us," using the plural pronoun to imply he believes his pack is still intact.

== Legacy ==
The image of David showing his fangs for the first time was used for the cover of John Kenneth Muir's Horror Films of the 1980s and The Vampire Book: The Encyclopedia of the Undead by J Gordon Melton.

Joss Whedon has expressed that the character Spike on the television series Buffy the Vampire Slayer was inspired by David.

The character became the eponymous vampire to people of the generation the film came out. This can be observed in a meme where he is seen killing the character Edward Cullen from the Twilight series, reflecting the resentment of vampire fans who feel characters like Edward have "ruined" what was once cool about vampires to audiences, which David stood for.

The Lost Boys film was one inspiration for the TTRPG Vampire: The Masquerade. There are a couple of Easter eggs, such as in their first game in the Bloodlines series. If you play as a Malkavian, you can give a food critic at an Italian restaurant maggots, and your character will say a version of David’s famous line, “Maggots, you are eating maggots.” Then later, The Lost Boys film is hinted at when you get to say in another piece of subsequent dialogue that says, “How could they do that to you? I bet they didn't get that idea from a movie.”

== In popular culture ==
David's character was spoofed on the television show Bloopers after the release of the film.
