= Seasons After =

American metal band

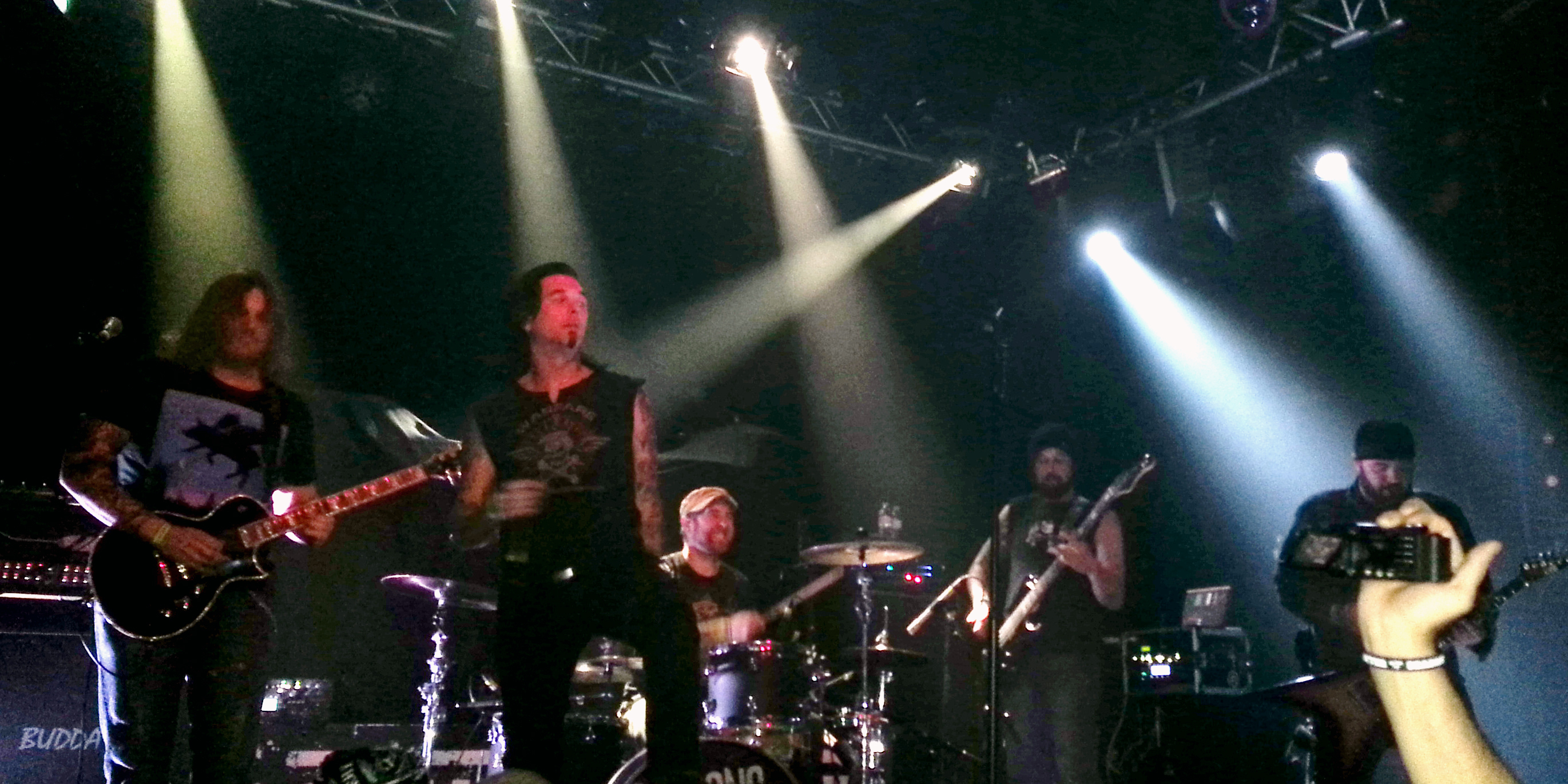
- Seasons After performing in 2015

Background information
- Origin: Wichita, Kansas, U.S.
- Genres: Heavy metal, metalcore, alternative metal, hard rock
- Years active: 2006–2017
- Label: Warner
- Members: Jimmy Beattie; Chris Dawson; Ryan Kennedy; Tony Housh
- Past members: Steve Frank; Chris Schlichting; Michael Byers; Tim Rails; Jesse Saint; Kyle Erbert
- Website: seasonsafter.com

Seasons After was an American heavy metal band from Wichita, Kansas, formed in 2006 by the guitarist, songwriter, sound engineer, and record producer Chris Dawson. Over the course of their career, the band has released three full-length studio albums and undergone numerous line-up changes with Dawson remaining the only founding member ever-present.

Due to the COVID-19 global pandemic and behind the scene issues occurring from 2017 they’ve decided to go and remain their separate ways.

== The beginning and Through Tomorrow ==
The band Seasons After was formed in Wichita, Kansas in 2006. Initially, it consisted of Chris Dawson (guitar), Steve Frank (guitar), Michael Byers (bass), Tim Rails (drums), and Chris Schlichting (lead singer). In 2008, they released a debut album Through Tomorrow independently and went on tour while on leave from their daily jobs.

Seasons After were signed by ILG/Warner in 2009, which re-released their debut album in 2010. They gained some popularity with their cover version of Gerard McMann's "Cry Little Sister", the theme song from the 1987 movie The Lost Boys. The song reached No. 15 on Billboard's Rock Songs chart in May 2010.

Seasons After performed on The Vans "Warped Tour" twice and on "Taste of Chaos" tour once.

== Changes in the line-up, going independent, and Calamity Scars & Memoirs ==
In August 2010, Seasons After parted ways with the original lead singer and founding member Chris Schlichting. No official statement explaining the reasons for his departure was ever published. He was replaced by Tony Housh shortly before the band's U.S. tour run in September 2010. Soon after, the band became involved in the dispute with their record company that lasted nearly 3 years. During that period, the band was almost inactive on social media, rarely updating the official sources with pictures taken in the studio.

On March 22, 2014, the band released a long statement on their official Facebook page in which cited the aforementioned dispute as the main reason for such a long period of inactivity. In the same statement, the band also announced their now independent status and mentioned that the recording sessions for their second album that began in the spring of 2011 had been long since completed and revealed its title as Calamity Scars & Memoirs.

On April 18, 2014, the band released a new song "Wake Me" which became the first single off the second record. For a limited period of time, it was available on the band's official website as a free download. On June 13, 2014, the second single, "So Long Goodbye", was published on YouTube as a lyric video. The album was released digitally on September 26, 2014, and physically on February 24, 2015.

After the album's release, the songs "Lights Out" and "Weathered & Worn" also became radio singles.

== Manifesto ==
During an interview with The Gentlemen's Show podcast on August 6, 2015, lead singer Tony Housh said that the band had written upwards of 60 songs while awaiting the outcome of their dispute with Warner Music Group, and announced that Seasons After was intending to release yet another new album by the end of 2015, with the band's aspiration being to release a new record one after the other for as long as they could.

The recording sessions for the band's third studio album were completed in May 2016. In September 2016, the song "Fighter" was released as a single. On October 7, 2016, the band revealed the title and the release date of their third album. Manifesto was scheduled to be released on November 11, 2016. The release went as planned and was followed by a series of short tour runs in several parts of the United States.

== Band members ==
Current

- Chris Dawson – rhythm guitar (2006–present)
- James Beattie – lead guitar, backing vocals (2009–present)
- Tony Housh – lead vocals (2010–present)
- Ryan Kennedy – bass (2016–present)

Former

- Steve Frank – lead guitar, backing vocals (2006–2009)
- Chris Schlichting – lead vocals (2006–2010)
- Michael Byers – bass, backing vocals (2006–2014)
- Tim Rails – drums (2006–2015)
- Jessie Saint – bass (2014–2015)
- Kyle Erbert – bass (2015)

Touring

- Dan Johnson – drums (2015)
- Jared Ruyle – drums (2016–present)

== Discography ==
Seasons After discography
- Studio albums: 3
- Singles: 6
- Music videos: 3

=== Studio albums ===
Year	Album details	Peak chart positions		
Year	Album details	The Billboard 200	Top Heatseekers	Top Rock Albums
2008	Through Tomorrow: Released: August 26, 2008; Label: Warner Music Group	–	–	–
2014	Calamity Scars & Memoirs: Released: September 26, 2014; Label: Seasons After Music	–	–	–
2016	Manifesto: Released: November 11, 2016; Label: Seasons After Music	–	–	–

=== Singles ===
Year	Single	Peak chart positions		Album
Year	Single	U.S. Main. Rock	U.S. Rock	Album
2009	"11:11"	—	—	Through Tomorrow
2009	"Cry Little Sister"	20	44	Through Tomorrow
2010	"Gettin' Even"	39	—	Through Tomorrow
2014	"So Long Goodbye"	—	—	Calamity Scars & Memoirs
2015	"Lights Out"	—	—	Calamity Scars & Memoirs
2015	"Weathered and Worn"	39	—	Calamity Scars & Memoirs
2016	"Fighter"	—	—	Manifesto

"—" denotes releases that did not chart.
