= Lost Boys: Reign of Frogs =

2008 comic book series by Hans Rodionoff

Publication information
- Publisher: Wildstorm
- Schedule: Monthly
- Format: Mini-series
- Publication date: May 2008 – August 2008
- No. of issues: 4

Creative team
- Written by: Hans Rodionoff
- Artist(s): Joel Gomez; Don Ho; Randy Mayor; Gabe Eltaeb

Lost Boys: Reign of Frogs is a four-issue comic book mini-series that was released from May to August 2008. It was published by Wildstorm and the story is set between The Lost Boys and Lost Boys: The Tribe.

== Plot ==
The story starts out in Luna Bay, California in 2007, one year before the events of Lost Boys: The Tribe. A young child enters into Edgar Frog's surfboard shop looking to become his next apprentice. He is subjected to a few tests in order to determine if he is a vampire. After his humanity is established Edgar turns him down and the boy mentions training with his brother Alan Frog instead. Edgar tells the boy to be quiet and then starts to tell him a story. The story then leads into a flashback of the Frog Brothers hunting days in Washington, D.C. in 1990. They hunt a series of politicians in a job for the president. The boy expresses skepticism that the president would hire them for such a task, and Edgar tells him how many politicians over the years were vampire slayers. The story then leads into another flashback in the year 1990 where the Frog brothers are returning to their comic book store in Santa Carla. When they arrive they think their parents are dead, and David Powers from the original film appears along with a crew of new vampires.

David and the Frog brothers begin to battle and the Frogs are quickly incapacitated. Soon Sam Emerson appears and helps Edgar and Alan fight the vampires. David then asks Sam for the location of Michael and Star. Sam's dog, Nanook, attacks a vampire that is about to hurt Sam, while Sam impales another with an arrow, killing him. Edgar then attacks two of the remaining vampires and David escapes vowing revenge. The three heroes are then shown in Sam's house. They first enter Grandpa's taxidermy looking for the antlers which were used to impale David. After they are found to be missing, they then go into the fridge noticing that the food is outdated and find the scent of blood in Grandpa's root beer bottles. They start to debate on whether Grandpa is a vampire or a vampire hunter, due to the things found and the fact that he knew to put a wooden stake on the front of his vehicle to kill Max. Grandpa soon returns and Sam asks him about these accusations. He then shifts his appearance revealing that he is in fact a vampire.

When Grandpa reveals he is a vampire, the Frog brothers try to kill him, but Sam stops them. Grandpa informs the Frogs that he is only a half vampire, and he feeds on animals in order to stay that way. When they ask him why killing Max did not restore his humanity, he tells them it is because Max didn't turn him, but The Widow Johnson did. Grandpa leads the boys to her house, and they go into the basement, only to be attacked by a swarm of female vampires. One of them over-powers Alan, so he yells for Edgar to help him. Edgar says to Alan that everything will be fine, but then Alan says the vampire forced him to drink her blood, and that he enjoyed it.

Edgar tries to comfort Alan by saying he will be fine as long as they kill the widow. But soon a giant vampire beast appears and kills Grandpa. It then attempts to kill Sam, but its attack is blocked by Edgar. He then fires stakes into it and stabs it multiple times. After fighting the beast, Edgar can't find Alan. He asks Sam if he knew where he was, but Sam seemed too upset and traumatized to answer. It cuts back to present day, and Edgar tells the boy that was the last time he ever saw Alan. He realizes it has gotten late, so he gives the boy a ride home. They are then attacked by an angry female vampire named Chloe who seemed to know Edgar. She would have liked to kill him, but she says that David wanted him alive. She asks him the whereabouts of Michael and Star, but Edgar says they died in a car accident. Chloe continues to prod, but soon the boy saves Edgar by killing Chloe. The boy then asks Edgar why he didn't kill her, because he's supposed to be the king of vampire slaying. Edgar then reveals that his entire story was greatly exaggerated. They never actually went after vampire politicians, and the Van Helsing medal he claimed the president awarded him with was purchased at Hot Topic during a Halloween sale, and the clerk was wearing a George H. W. Bush mask. He also told the boy that the Dominatrix Vampires they killed were sleeping, because it was during the day. Edgar is impressed by the boy's slaying skills and asks him to accompany him on his search for David. Then it cuts back to Santa Carla in 1987. It depicts the scene from The Lost Boys in which David and his gang feed on the people at a bonfire party. It is revealed that one of those people was Shane Powers (The head vampire in "The Tribe"). He was the only survivor, but was now a vampire. He starts to feel the thirst and goes into the ocean and feeds on a shark. When he gets back to the shore he is upset about his friends being killed. He then says to himself that he will become like David and start his own family of vampires - thus creating "The Tribe".

== Issues ==
- Issue #1: Released May 14, 2008
- Issue #2: Released June 11, 2008
- Issue #3: Released July 9, 2008
- Issue #4: Released August 27, 2008

== References to the film ==
- Edgar tells Chloe that Michael and Star (from the first film) died in a car accident. This relates to the sequel, in that the parents of Chris and Nicole also died in a car accident. However, in the film Lost Boys: The Thirst, it is revealed that Star and Michael are alive. There is no evidence to suggest Chris and Nicole's parents are Michael and Star, as was previously written.
- The Widow Johnson is the character in the first film (who doesn't actually appear) to whom grandpa delivers a taxidermy dog.
- At the end of the fourth issue, Shane refers to David as his half-brother, since it was David who turned him into a vampire. In the first film, David Powers is portrayed by Kiefer Sutherland and the second film, Shane Powers is portrayed by Angus Sutherland. The two are actually brothers in real life.
- Shane is the main villain of the second film. He does indeed form his own gang called The Tribe, but is killed by Chris Emerson via beheading with a sword while the rest of his gang are killed by Chris Emerson and Edgar Frog.
- In the second film, references are made to Alan Frog becoming a vampire. Also in two alternate ending sequences, Alan is depicted as such a creature. In the third film it is revealed that he was turned into a half-vampire during a hunt and helps Edgar kill the Alpha Vampire, curing him.
- In The Thirst, when Edgar and Zoe are fighting a vampire in the comic book store, the first issue of Reign of Frogs can be seen in the background.

== See also ==
- List of comics based on films
