= Through Tomorrow =

Studio album by Seasons After
- Released: August 26, 2008; March 23, 2010 (reissue)
- Genres: Heavy metal, melodic metalcore
- Length: 47:48 (original release); 50:46 (deluxe edition)
- Label: Dirtbag Records
- Producers: Alex Gerst; Joe Marlett (re-mixing and re-remastering)

Singles from Through Tomorrow
- 1. "11:11" Released: 2009; 2. "Cry Little Sister" Released: 2010

Through Tomorrow is the debut album by American heavy metal band Seasons After. Originally, it was released in 2008 and then remastered, remixed and released again in 2010, with an acoustic version of "Cry Little Sister" as a bonus track. The song "11:11" was chosen to be the album's first single. The second single off the album is a cover of the 1980s classic "Cry Little Sister" by Gerard McMann, made famous by the film The Lost Boys. The music video for the song premiered on MTV2's Headbangers Ball.

== Track listing ==
No.	Title	Length
1.	"Some Things Burn"	4:43
2.	"Through Tomorrow"	5:20
3.	"On Your Own"	4:39
4.	"11:11"	3:42
5.	"Marked"	4:36
6.	"Hell Is..."	5:44
7.	"Save You"	2:59
8.	"The Knife"	3:44
9.	"Let Go"	3:52
10.	"Cry Little Sister"	4:02
11.	"The Worst Parts"	4:18
12.	"Cry Little Sister (Acoustic Version)"	4:07
13.	"Gettin' Even"	3:17
Total length:		50:46

== Reception ==
The album received generally favorable reviews with some reviewers claiming: "The album has a few potential hit singles that could win over a large audience, while their more aggressive side will bring in those that tend to view modern rock radio with contempt".

The album's musical direction has also been compared to the bands such as Avenged Sevenfold, Bullet for My Valentine, and Killswitch Engage.
