= The New Mutants (soundtrack) =

2020 film score by Mark Snow

The New Mutants (Original Motion Picture Soundtrack)

Film score by Mark Snow
- Released: August 28, 2020
- Recorded: 2020
- Genre: Film score
- Length: 1:03:41
- Label: Hollywood Records
- Director: Josh Boone

Mark Snow chronology
Life of Riley (2014)	The New Mutants (2020)

The New Mutants (Original Motion Picture Soundtrack) is the soundtrack album to the 2020 film of the same name, based on the Marvel Comics superhero team the New Mutants. It is a spinoff of the X-Men film series, and the thirteenth and final installment overall. Directed by Josh Boone, the film's musical score is composed by Mark Snow in his final composition before his death on July 4, 2025. The soundtrack album was released alongside the film on August 28, 2020, by Hollywood Records.

== Background ==
Nate Walcott and Mike Mogis were confirmed in December 2017 to be composing the score for the film, having worked with Boone on his previous films Stuck in Love (2012) and The Fault in Our Stars (2014). In May 2018, Marilyn Manson announced that his cover of the song "Cry Little Sister"—originally written for the film The Lost Boys (1987) by Gerard McMahon—which Manson debuted during his Heaven Upside Down tour, had been recorded specifically for The New Mutants soundtrack, despite appearing in an ad in 2018 for the series Titans and being released as a single in 2018. Manson would also have an acting credit in the film, as the voice of The Smiling Men.

In February 2020, Mark Snow was revealed to have composed the score for the final version of the film, though additional music composed by Walcott and Mogis would still be used in the soundtrack, but "Cry Little Sister" would not appear on the official soundtrack album. Snow previously served as a composer on other comic book-based adaptations, including Birds of Prey (2002–03) and the first six seasons of Smallville (2001–07). The soundtrack was released on the same date as the film (August 28, 2020) through Hollywood Records. The soundtrack would be Snow's final composition before his death on July 4, 2025.

== Track listing ==
All music is composed by Mark Snow.

The New Mutants: Original Motion Picture Soundtrack
No.	Title	Length
1.	"No Way Out"	3:32
2.	"Smiling Man"	2:14
3.	"Rahne Dome"	1:30
4.	"The Bear Advances"	1:15
5.	"Down from the Tower"	2:14
6.	"Red Snow"	1:20
7.	"Rahne's Story"	1:05
8.	"Girl Fight"	0:50
9.	"Lie Detector"	2:16
10.	"So Am I"	0:57
11.	"Explaining to Rahne"	1:41
12.	"The Grand Tour"	1:02
13.	"Regrouping"	2:35
14.	"Girls Chat/Essex Orders"	2:20
15.	"Dani Goes Under"	4:40
16.	"Nervous Shower/Meditation"	1:19
17.	"Rahne's Confessional"	1:06
18.	"Obedience"	0:58
19.	"Fighting Back"	2:52
20.	"Dome Pt. 2"	2:16
21.	"Too Hot"	2:17
22.	"Dani Begins Testing"	0:42
23.	"Wake Up in Hospital"	2:34
24.	"Hey Yogi"	1:05
25.	"Not So Solitary"	1:06
26.	"Dr. Reyes Knows Best/Fighting the Bear"	3:31
27.	"Nice Bear"	3:56
28.	"Calling All Mutants"	0:56
29.	"Victory"	3:40
30.	"Control/Time to Sleep"	3:52
Total length:		63:41

== Reception ==
Jordan Mintzer of The Hollywood Reporter criticized the score, saying it was "the kind of faceless rock music you hear at The Cheesecake Factory".

== Charts ==
The New Mutants (Original Motion Picture Soundtrack)
Chart (2021)	Peak position
UK Album Downloads (OCC)	1

== Accolades ==
In January 2021, Snow's work on The New Mutants was nominated for "Best Original Score in a Sci-Fi/Fantasy Film" at the 11th Hollywood Music in Media Awards, but lost to Ludwig Göransson for his work on Tenet (2020).
