= The Lost Boys (musical) =

Musical based on 1987 Joel Schumacher film

- A New Musical
- Playbill cover of Broadway run
- Music: The Rescues
- Lyrics: The Rescues
- Book: David Hornsby; Chris Hoch
- Setting: Santa Carla, California; 1987
- Basis: Film The Lost Boys by: Janice Fischer; James Jeremias; Jeffrey Boam
- Premiere: March 27, 2026: Palace Theatre, New York City

The Lost Boys: A New Musical is a musical with music and lyrics by American indie pop/rock band the Rescues and a book by David Hornsby and Chris Hoch, based on the 1987 comedy horror cult classic film The Lost Boys.

Directed by Michael Arden, the show opened at the Palace Theatre on Broadway in April 2026.

== Development ==
Producers Patrick Wilson, James Carpinello, and Marcus Chait had issues securing the stage rights for The Lost Boys from Warner Bros until the COVID-19 lockdowns in 2020: "We had a lot of time to Zoom, a lot of time to meet with masks and talk about how we bring vampires to life." Director Michael Arden suggested The Rescues as the musical's lyricists and composers, and the musical's producing team reached out to the band at a concert in 2021. An industry-only presentation of The Lost Boys was held on March 14, 2025.

The song "Have to Have You" was released as a single on October 14, 2025, along with a video to promote the musical. The recorded demo featured an electric guitar solo from Slash. The subsequent EP The Santa Carla Sessions was released on Halloween, featuring two additional songs from the musical: "Wild" and "Belong to Someone".

Broadway previews at the Palace Theatre began March 27, 2026, and The Lost Boys opened April 26, receiving mixed to positive reviews.

== Plot ==
Act I

The musical opens in a prologue at the supposedly abandoned Steelworks Factory of Santa Carla in 1987, where a lone police officer investigates a report on strange noises, finding a broadcast of then President Ronald Reagan speaking about the need for traditional family values, only to get captured and eaten by a flying figure, David.

Meanwhile, the recently divorced Lucy Emerson and her sons, Michael and Sam, move from Phoenix Arizona to Lucy's childhood home, the California seaside town of Santa Carla for a fresh start ("No More Monsters"). As they unpack their car into Lucy's deceased father's house, it becomes clear that there's a rift between the three concerning the topic of the boys' father and Lucy's ex-husband, resulting in Michael leaving the house after an argument with his brother. Michael explores the boardwalk looking for cheap thrills as a way to escape the responsibilities he's been pushed into following the divorce ("Lose Yourself"), and ends up witnessing the performance of a local rock band called "The Lost Boys" (performing "Have to Have You") with Michael becoming infatuated with one of the band's singers, a young woman named Star.

Down the boardwalk, the movie rental store owner Max offers Lucy a job that she needs to support her boys, momentarily running into the wife of the missing police officer who is looking for her husband. At the same time in the nearby comic book store, Sam meets the Frog Brothers, Edgar and Alan, where they warn him about dangers lurking in Santa Carla, naming vampires as the cause of that years' 32 missing persons cases, causing Sam to run from the shop terrified ("Murder Capital of the World"). Meanwhile, Michael meets Star and the two hit it off with her offering to pierce his ears, prompting him to scrounge for the items Star needs, after David momentarily freezes time to warn Star that she needs to feed ("Hurt a Little"). Under the pier, faced with Michael's blood after piercing his ear, Star runs off. David reveals himself and finishes the piercing before introducing Michael to the other band members: bassist Dwayne, guitarist Marko, and drummer Paul. David offers Michael a guitar lesson as a distraction, showing off his hypnotism skills to make Michael hit the correct chords as the band crowds in around him, preparing to eat him ("Time to Kill"). Michael evades harm when Sam, Lucy, Max, and Pete, one of Max's employees, arrive, and Max escorts the Emersons back home. After they leave, the Lost Boys feast on Pete revealing their fangs and exposing them as vampires to the audience. ("Having Pete For Dinner")

At home, the rift between Michael and Sam gets worse concerning their father favoring Sam over Michael. This puts more pressure on Lucy who begins her first day at VideoMax where she hopes she can find happiness in Santa Carla after her failed marriage ("The Good Part") and Max invites her on a tour of the town. That evening, Michael and Star admit their mutual attraction ("Now, Forever") and almost kiss before The Lost Boys interrupt, with David challenging Michael into a motorcycle race to Coronado Bluff ("Lost Boy") where Michael almost drives over the edge of the cliff. In anger, Michael hits David across the face challenging him to a fight, which simply amuses David who invites Michael to come to their hangout spot (The ironworks factory). Despite Star pleading with Michael to go home, he accepts David's invitation to the band's home in the steelworks factory. In the factory, David ends up getting Michael to lift his shirt where a deep bruise is revealed that came from Michael and Sam's father, revealing him to have been abusive, which David manipulates to get Michael closer to him and the others. After David adds his blood to a goblet of wine, Michael accepts the offer to drink and join their "family", initially hesitating before Star tells him to do it ("Take My Heart with You"). The Lost Boys then take Michael to a bridge where they each drop from the railing as a train approaches. Instead of falling, Michael finds himself flying alongside the Lost Boys, finally feeling part of a family ("Belong to Someone").

The next day, Michael wakes up late and assumes the previous night was a strange dream, suffering a sensitivity to the morning light requiring him to wear sunglasses indoors. While Lucy is out with Max, the Frog Brothers sneak into the Emerson house at night and offer Sam a comic book called "Vampires Everywhere" that supposedly acts as a vampire survival guide. As Sam reads the symptoms of a fledgling vampire, Michael starts exhibiting the strange symptoms including a debilitating pain in his stomach, a burned reaction to regular tap water, and experiencing hallucinations of his abusive father scolding him for dropping food and kicking him to the ground in much the way that Michael received his bruise, nearly attacking Sam with a baseball bat as he tries to fight off the vision causing Sam to run upstairs and lock his door. All the while David and the Lost Boys sing about his changing to becoming a vampire with them ("Secret Comes Out"). Michael begins to fly again, loses control, and crashes through Sam's window.

Act II

Sam tells the Frog Brothers about Michael's strange behaviour. They confirm he's becoming a vampire and offer to kill Michael, which Sam immediately shuts down ("My Brother Is A..."). Max takes Lucy to the now-abandoned Neverland playground, once a fond part of her youth, and they romp around the old park ("Wild"). Michael confronts the Lost Boys at their concert, and David reassures him they are on this path together ("Belong to Someone (Reprise)"). Watching in horror as the Lost Boys feed on a group of surfers, Michael refuses to make his first kill and runs away while being tormented by a vision of his father ("You Belong to Me"). Star refuses to feed despite her waning strength vowing to never become like the monsters that turned her ("War").

Sam and the Frog Brothers attempt to uncover the head vampire, putting Max through a series of tests during dinner at the Emerson house that result in Max advising Lucy to be more firm with her boys ("Your Mom's Boyfriend Is A..."). Michael and Star resolve to help each other no matter what ("Lose Yourself (Reprise)"). Lucy laments that she can't seem to help her troubled son and blames herself for what happened with her husband and her boys ("Michael"). Motivated by the Frog Brothers and his comic books, Sam realizes how to tap into his inner strength and embrace his identity, openly calling himself queer ("Superpower"). Sam and the Frog Brothers raid the vampire hideout, killing Marko, and escaping with the help of Michael and Star as David, Dwayne, and Paul promise to avenge their brother ("Time to Kill (Reprise)").

The Emersons and their allies gather courage for the looming conflict as Michael and Sam begin to heal their relationship and move on from their father's abuse ("No More Monsters (Reprise)"). Meanwhile Lucy and Max are off on a dinner date, and when Lucy brings up Max's advice the previous night he affirms that teenage boys everywhere are rebellious and '"lost", asserting ideals of manhood and family values reminiscent of Reagan's speech on the television. Lucy admits that the world didn't fail her sons, she did. Back at the Emerson the vampires attack, and the ensuing battle between Paul and the Frogs, results in the killing of Paul, who is melted in the bathroom thanks to a Holy Water trap. Dwayne is impaled by a crossbow arrow from Sam and killed by the exploded stereo. David, the supposed head-vampire, fights with Michael who runs him through on Star's stake. David's death was expected to end Michael and Star's half-vampire hood, but neither Star nor Michael feel any different. Lucy and Max come to the house, and Max exposes himself as the head vampire, revealing his scheme to make Lucy the mother of his vampire family. Lucy's protective instincts ultimately triumph and she stabs Max through the heart with her father's cross ("The Reckoning"). Fortunate to defeat the vampires, the survivors envision a better future together as a new found family is formed ("If We Make it Through the Night").

Sometime later in an Epilogue taking place at in the Steelworks Factory, the wife of the police officer finds her husband's cap and the bottle of vampire blood, and she drinks from the chalice.

== Cast and characters ==
Character(s)	Broadway
Character(s)	2026
Michael Emerson	LJ Benet
Lucy Emerson	Shoshana Bean (Note: Caissie Levy was originally cast as Lucy but exited the production in November 2025 due to the extension of Ragtime and a need for more time with her family.)
David	Ali Louis Bourzgui
Sam Emerson	Benjamin Pajak
Star	Maria Wirries
Max	Paul Alexander Nolan
Alan Frog	Jennifer Duka
Edgar Frog	Miguel Gil
Marko	Brian Flores
Dwayne	Sean Grandillo
Paul	Dean Maupin

== Musical numbers ==
Act I

- "No More Monsters" - Lucy, Michael, Sam, Ensemble
- "Lose Yourself" - Michael, Ensemble
- "Have to Have You" - David, Marko, Dwayne, Paul, Star, Michael, Ensemble
- "Murder Capital of the World" - Alan, Edgar, Ensemble
- "Hurt a Little" - Star, Michael
- "Time to Kill" - David, Marko, Dwayne, Paul, Ensemble
- "The Good Part" - Lucy, Ensemble
- "Now, Forever" - Star, Michael
- "Lost Boy" - David, Michael, Marko, Dwayne, Paul, Ensemble
- "Take My Heart With You" - David, Star, Marko, Dwayne, Paul, Ensemble
- "Thou Shall Not..." - Ensemble
- "Hurt a Little" (reprise) - Star
- "Belong to Someone" - Michael, David, Marko, Dwayne, Paul, Ensemble
- "Secret Comes Out" - David, Star, Michael, Marko, Dwayne, Paul, Ensemble

Act II

- "My Brother Is A..." - Sam, Alan, Edgar, Ensemble
- "Wild" - Lucy, Max, Ensemble
- "Belong to Someone" (reprise) - David, Marko, Dwayne, Paul, Michael
- "You Belong to Me" - Father, David, Marko, Dwayne, Paul, Ensemble
- "War" - Star, Ensemble
- "Your Mom's Boyfriend Is A..." - Alan, Edgar, Sam, Ensemble
- "Lose Yourself" (reprise) - Lucy, Michael, Star
- "Michael" - Lucy
- "Superpower" - Sam, Ensemble
- "No More Monsters" (reprise) - Sam, Alan, Edgar, Michael, Star, Ensemble
- "The Reckoning" - Max, Lucy, Ensemble
- "Home" (prelude) - Michael, Lucy, Sam, Ensemble
- "If We Make it Through the Night" - Full Company

Atlantic Records released the original Broadway cast recording digitally on 24 July 2026. The album includes the bonus track "Brother", which was cut from the show during previews.

== Awards and nominations ==
Year	Award	Category	Work	Result	Ref.
2026	Drama League Awards	Outstanding Production of a Musical		Nominated	
2026	Drama League Awards	Outstanding Direction of a Musical	Michael Arden	Nominated	
2026	Drama League Awards	Distinguished Performance	Shoshana Bean	Nominated	
2026	Drama League Awards	Distinguished Performance	Ali Louis Bourzgui	Nominated	
2026	Outer Critics Circle Awards	Outstanding New Broadway Musical		Nominated	
2026	Outer Critics Circle Awards	Outstanding Book of a Musical	David Hornsby and Chris Hoch	Nominated	
2026	Outer Critics Circle Awards	Outstanding New Score	The Rescues	Nominated	
2026	Outer Critics Circle Awards	Outstanding Director of a Musical	Michael Arden	Nominated	
2026	Outer Critics Circle Awards	Outstanding Orchestrations	Ethan Popp and The Rescues	Nominated	
2026	Outer Critics Circle Awards	Outstanding Featured Performer in a Broadway Musical	Ali Louis Bourzgui	Nominated	
2026	Outer Critics Circle Awards	Outstanding Featured Performer in a Broadway Musical	Benjamin Pajak	Nominated	
2026	Outer Critics Circle Awards	Outstanding Scenic Design	Dane Laffrey	Won	
2026	Outer Critics Circle Awards	Outstanding Costume Design	Ryan Park	Nominated	
2026	Outer Critics Circle Awards	Outstanding Lighting Design	Jen Schriever and Michael Arden	Won	
2026	Outer Critics Circle Awards	Outstanding Sound Design	Adam Fisher	Nominated	
2026	Drama Desk Awards	Outstanding Choreography	Lauren Yalango-Grant and Christopher Cree Grant	Nominated	
2026	Drama Desk Awards	Outstanding Scenic Design of a Musical	Dane Laffrey	Won	
2026	Drama Desk Awards	Outstanding Lighting Design of a Musical	Jen Schriever and Michael Arden	Won	
2026	Drama Desk Awards	Outstanding Wig and Hair	David Brian Brown	Nominated	
2026	Drama Desk Awards	Outstanding Fight Choreography	Sordelet Inc.	Nominated	
2026	Tony Awards	Best Musical		Nominated	
2026	Tony Awards	Best Featured Actor in a Musical	Ali Louis Bourzgui	Won	
2026	Tony Awards	Best Featured Actress in a Musical	Shoshana Bean	Won	
2026	Tony Awards	Best Direction of a Musical	Michael Arden	Nominated	
2026	Tony Awards	Best Book of a Musical	Chris Hoch and David Hornsby	Nominated	
2026	Tony Awards	Best Score	The Rescues	Nominated	
2026	Tony Awards	Best Scenic Design of a Musical	Dane Laffrey	Won	
2026	Tony Awards	Best Costume Design of a Musical	Ryan Park	Nominated	
2026	Tony Awards	Best Lighting Design of a Musical	Jen Schriever and Michael Arden	Won	
2026	Tony Awards	Best Sound Design of a Musical	Adam Fisher	Nominated	
2026	Tony Awards	Best Choreography	Christopher Cree Grant and Lauren Yalango-Grant	Nominated	
2026	Tony Awards	Best Orchestrations	Kyler England, Adrianne Gonzalez, Ethan Popp and Gabriel Mann	Nominated	
2026	Dorian Awards	Outstanding Broadway Musical		Nominated	
2026	Dorian Awards	Outstanding LGBTQ Broadway Production		Nominated	
2026	Dorian Awards	Outstanding Featured Performance in a Broadway Musical	Shoshana Bean	Nominated	
2026	Dorian Awards	Outstanding Featured Performance in a Broadway Musical	Ali Louis Bourzgui	Nominated	
2026	Dorian Awards	Outstanding Featured Performance in a Broadway Musical	Benjamin Pajak	Nominated	
2026	Dorian Awards	Outstanding Original Score of a Broadway Production	The Rescues	Won	
2026	Dorian Awards	Outstanding Book of a Broadway Musical	David Hornsby and Chris Hoch	Nominated	
2026	Dorian Awards	Outstanding Design of a Broadway Production		Won	
