= The Rescues =

American rock band

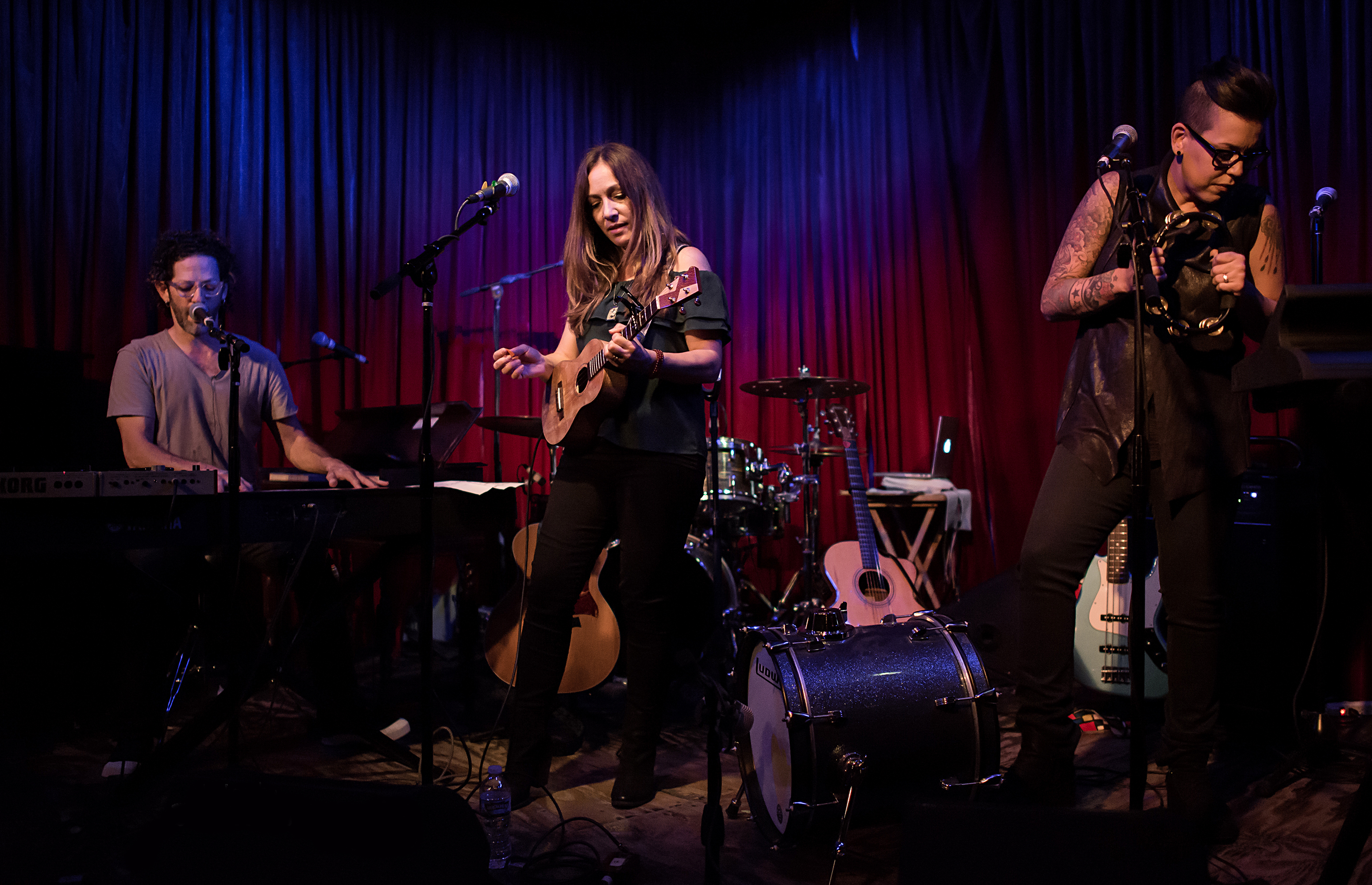
- The Rescues performing in 2016

Background information
- Origin: Los Angeles, California
- Genres: Adult Alternative; Pop rock; Indie rock
- Years active: 2008–present
- Label: Universal Republic
- Members: Kyler England; Adrianne Gonzalez; Gabriel Mann
- Past members: Rob Giles
- Website: www.therescues.com

The Rescues are an American rock band from Los Angeles, California, formed in 2008. Their indie pop/rock sound is notable for using three- and four-part vocal harmonies. In addition to four album releases, the Rescues scored The Lost Boys musical, for which they were nominated for the 2026 Tony Award for Best Score and Tony Award for Best Orchestrations.

== History ==
"The Rescues" were formed in 2008 by singer/songwriters and multi instrumentalists Kyler England, Adrianne Gonzalez and Gabriel Mann, who met while performing on the singer-songwriter circuit in L.A.. While all members had experienced individual success prior to forming the group, their collaboration has proved to be greater than the sum of its parts. The Rescues' music has been placed in several TV series, such as One Tree Hill, Private Practice, Pretty Little Liars, The Umbrella Academy, and Grey's Anatomy.

The band released their first record, a four-song, self-titled EP in January 2008, followed by the album Crazy Ever After in November of the same year. In June 2010 they released the album Let Loose The Horses.

Their third album Blah Blah Love and War was first released in November 2013 to contributors of their fundraising campaign. The release was delayed slightly due to Hurricane Sandy, which affected the studio where the album was being mastered. All songs are credited to The Rescues, except "Love Like Cyanide" which is credited to The Rescues and Ari Levine. The band released a self-titled album on June 1, 2017.

A cappella group Pentatonix covered the band's song "My Heart With You" on their 2021 Christmas album Evergreen.

The band's cover of "Don't Dream it's Over" by Crowded House mixed with the instrumentals of their cover of "Hold On" by Sarah McLachlan was featured as the season finale song on the AMC+ series Pantheon in October 2022.

The band was approached in late 2021 by the production team behind a musical adaptation of The Lost Boys after director Michael Arden suggested them for the score. The band accepted the offer, writing original songs for the show and reworking some of their previous songs to better fit the story. The Lost Boys musical opened on Broadway in April 2026. For their work, the band was nominated for the 2026 Tony Award for Best Score, Tony Award for Best Orchestrations., Outer Critics Circle Award for Outstanding New Score, Outer Critics Circle Award for Outstanding Orchestrations,, and the Drama League Award for Outstanding Production of a Musical as producers.

== Discography ==
=== Albums ===
- Crazy Ever After (2008)
- Let Loose The Horses (2010)
- Blah Blah Love and War (2013)
- The Rescues (2017)

=== Extended plays ===
- The Rescues (2010)

== Awards and nominations ==
Year	Award	Category	Work	Result	Ref.
2026	Tony Award	Best Score	The Lost Boys	Nominated	
2026	Tony Award	Best Orchestrations	The Lost Boys	Nominated	
2026	Outer Critics Circle Award	Outstanding New Score	The Lost Boys	Nominated	
2026	Outer Critics Circle Award	Outstanding Orchestrations	The Lost Boys	Nominated	
2026	Drama League Award	Outstanding Production of a Musical	The Lost Boys	Nominated	
2026	Dorian Award	Outstanding Original Score of a Broadway Production	The Lost Boys	Won	
