= We Live in Cairo =

2019 American musical

- Music: Daniel Lazour, Patrick Lazour
- Lyrics: Daniel Lazour, Patrick Lazour
- Book: Daniel Lazour, Patrick Lazour
- Setting: Cairo, Egypt
- Basis: 2011 Egyptian Revolution
- Premiere: 22 May 2019: American Repertory Theater, Cambridge, Massachusetts

We Live in Cairo is a musical following the 2011 Egyptian revolution (part of the wider Arab Spring) and its aftermath. The show's book, music, and lyrics were written by Lebanese-American brothers Daniel and Patrick Lazour.

== Development and productions ==
The show was inspired by a 2011 photograph taken by Ed Ou for The New York Times of young Egyptian activists looking at a computer screen. The first draft of the show was written as the protests were happening, and ended with Hosni Mubarak's ousting from power. However, as events continued to unfold, the Lazour brothers decided the show needed to include the aftermath of the protests as well. The brothers were eventually able to meet with some Egyptian activists to gain more insight for the show, including Wael Ghonim and Ganzeer, who created the poster art for the show. Early drafts of the show told the story non-linearly, but the decision was eventually made to stick to a chronological telling of events.

The show had its first reading at Columbia University. In 2015, the production had a residency at the Eugene O'Neill Theatre Center's National Music Conference.

The show was part of the National Alliance for Musical Theatre's Festival of New Musicals in 2016. At the time the show was a single act. That same year, the show had a residency at the American Repertory Theater. The show was workshopped at American University in Cairo in 2017. The show also had a staged reading at the New York Theatre Workshop in April of that year.

The show premiered on in 2019 at the American Repertory Theater's Loeb Drama Center. Previews began 14 May, with opening night on 22 May. The show was directed by Taibi Magar and choreographed by Samar Haddad King. The production used projections to create outdoor scenes and to show actual social media posts, footage, and photographs from the 2011 protests.

In August 2024, it was announced that We Live in Cairo would receive an Off-Broadway run at the New York Theatre Workshop from October 27 to November 24, following previews beginning on October 9. The announced cast included Ali Louis Bourzgui as Amir, Drew Elhamalawy as Hassan, John El-Jor as Karim, Nadina Hassan as Layla, Michael Khalid Karadsheh as Hany, and Rotana Tarabzouni as Fadwa. The production was directed by Taibi Magar.

== Plot ==
=== 2019 production ===
==== Act l ====
The show begins with the actors teaching the audience a protest song ("Genealogy of Revolution").

Six young Egyptian students from the American University in Cairo (Amir, Fadwa, Hany, Hassan, Karim, and Layla) meet in a warehouse to discuss demonstration tactics ("Loud Voice"). Layla takes photographs in Cairo and notices the poverty around her ("Cairo Street Scenes"). After a student is killed by the Egyptian police, the six take to the streets and to social media to protest ("Flap My Wings"). Karim goes out one night to paint a mural in support of the protesters ("Wall Song").

Amir, a Christian, falls for Layla, who is Muslim. He composes a song for her ("Movement"). Amir later finishes a song he has been working on to inspire his friends, and plays it for them ("Tahrir is Now").

The act ends with the students protesting at Tahrir Square and Egyptian president Hosni Mubarak being ousted from power ("The 18 Days").

==== Act ll ====
Mohammed Morsi is elected to power. Hany believes the results of the free election should be respected, while Fadwa disagrees, thinking Morsi is just as much of a tyrant as Mubarak. Hassan's connections to the Muslim Brotherhood cause further conflict. Disagreements splinter the group, with Hany moving to New York City to attend law school.

Amir is killed in Rabaa Square during a protest. Hany returns to Egypt but is arrested, along with Fadwa. Layla visits Hany in prison, where she reaffirms her commitment to not only survive in Cairo, but to live in Cairo ("Living Here").

=== 2024 production ===
==== Act I ====
Invited by her boyfriend, Amir, to a "release party," Layla makes her way through the streets of Cairo to The Gallery, a place where young artists gather ("Midnight in Cairo"). What she thinks is an album release party actually turns out to be a celebration for Fadwa, a protester who was just released from prison for posting anti-Mubarak rhetoric on Facebook. Amir, his brother, Hany, and Fadwa's cousin, Karim put on a satirical performance, including a giant puppet of Egyptian President Hosni Mubarak, much to Layla's shock ("Baba Mubarak's Entrance"/"Sharm El Sheikh"). Layla shows Fadwa her photography, and Fadwa insists that the only way to achieve freedom is to take matters into your own hands ("Our Way to Happiness).

Amir and Hany work on a song together. Hany expresses his disapproval of Amir and Layla's relationship and confesses that he is looking into law schools in New York, with the plan to move them both there. Karim takes to the streets to spray paint anti-Mubarak murals, with Fadwa and Layla joining to take pictures of the images ("Wall Song I"). Karim uses his father's political status to evade arrest ("Wall Song II"). A man with ties to the Muslim Brotherhood, Hassan paints over Karim's mural and then sends him a tweet to come to building 329, where he is attempting to recreate the mural that he covered up ("Wall Song III"). Hassan confesses to Karim that he's made to cover up the murals by his father, but he is "a youth of the revolution." Karim agrees to take Hassan under his wing, and they finish the mural together ("Wall Song IV").

Fadwa explains to Layla that her father was imprisoned for protesting Mubarak when she was younger, and she encourages Layla to see their city beyond the buildings and architecture. Layla takes a closer look at the streets of Cairo ("Cairo Street Scenes"). Everyone convenes at The Gallery, and Karim introduces Hassan to the group. While gathered, they see photos of Khaled Said, a man killed in police custody, though authorities claim he died of an overdose. They all join a Facebook group called "We are all Khaled Said" and vow to do what they can to end the Mubarak Regime ("Flap My Wings").

Layla and Amir reflect on their relationship and dream of a Cairo where a Muslim woman and a Christian man can be together ("Movement"). The group heads to Tahrir Square where they begin protesting, and Hassan is shot with a rubber bullet ("The Eighteen Days I"). They discover that the government has shut down the internet, and Amir and Hany attempt to distract Hassan with their new song ("The Eighteen Days II"). Layla struggles to fully capture the reality of the revolution in a single picture, but she does her best as the protests continue ("The Eighteen Days III"). Layla encourages Amir to play his and Hany's new song for the people in the Square, and on Day 18 of the protests, Mubarak is ousted from power ("Tahrir is Now").

==== Act II ====
An entr’acte sees everyone gather to reflect on the revolution ("Genealogy of Revolution"). The group meets at a club in Mohandiseen to celebrate successfully overthrowing their president. Disagreements arise surrounding the upcoming election, with Fadwa pushing for a constitution first while Hany thinks elections are the priority, Hassan resisting his father's wishes to vote in favor of the Brotherhood, and Karim trying to avoid the talk of politics entirely. Mohamed Morsi, the Brotherhood candidate, becomes the first democratically elected Egyptian president ("Afterparties"). The rift in the group widens as Fadwa insists they must fight to overthrow Morsi, while Hany believes that they should respect the results of the election. Karim states that Fadwa wrote in his name as a form of protest and describes his reign as King Farouk II ("The Benevolent Regime of King Farouk II"). Hassan confides in Karim that his father believes his new friends turned him against the Brotherhood ("Wall Song (reprise)").

While Amir works on a new song, Layla and Fadwa take to the streets, collecting signatures for a new group called "Tamarod" ("Dreaming Words (unfinished)"). Layla calls off her and Amir's relationship, saying she can't keep hoping for a government that would allow them to be together and instead needs to focus on getting Morsi out of power. Hany tells Amir that he got into Columbia law school, and the two of them are moving to New York to live with their uncle. Amir refuses, stating that he has a duty to the revolution.

Time passes, and Amir reflects on their fractured group ("I Wake Up With a Melody"). Fadwa and Layla celebrate their successful protests as Morsi and the Brotherhood are deposed by the Egyptian army. Hassan runs into Amir while looking for materials for a Brotherhood protest. He shows Amir a clip of him singing in Tahrir Square, and the two of them sing the song together. Amir offers to go with Hassan to his protest ("Tahrir is Now (reprise)").

The group reunites, minus Amir who was killed by the army at the protest. Fadwa pleads with them to join her for a sit-in in honor of Amir ("Each and Every Name"). Karim refuses, saying he regrets overthrowing Mubarak, but Hany agrees to go. Fadwa and Hany are the only two at the sit-in. Fadwa plans to hold up an image of Amir's face in front of a police car while Hany films. Hany gets distracted by a vision of Amir writing his song, and they finish it together while Fadwa goes forward with her plan ("Dreaming Words"). Fadwa and Hany are both arrested.

Layla visits Hany in prison. She tells him that they haven't been able to find Fadwa, and that she plans to leave the country. As she steps onto the streets of Cairo, she reflects on her home and vows to not just survive in her country but to live in it. She remembers Fadwa's words from years prior and returns to Hany and commits to visiting him every day until he's released ("Living Here").

== Characters ==
- Amir – a Coptic Christian songwriter and guitar player who is Hany's brother. He falls in love with Layla.
- Fadwa – a "firebrand" activist who spent time in prison for a previous protest.
- Hany – Amir's brother, a Copt songwriter and aspring lawyer, who is less enthusiastic about the potential relationship between his brother and Layla.
- Hassan – a graffiti propagandist with family connections to the Muslim Brotherhood
- Karim – a graffiti propagandist who is a mentor to and attracted to Hassan
- Layla – a Muslim photographer who is in love with Amir

== Music ==
The 2019 production had a band with seven musicians (Madeline Smith, Naseem Alatrash, Kate Foss, Bengisu Gökçe, Nacho González Nappa, Ghassan Sawalhi, Jeremy Smith) playing doumbek, hand drums, guitar, oud, and strings. The show's music was characterized as mixing punk, traditional Middle Eastern music, and 1960s folk music. The Lazours have cited Sayed Darwish, Ramy Essam, Fairuz, Umm Kulthum, and Sheikh Imam as musical influences.

=== Flap My Wings: Songs from We Live in Cairo ===
On 25 January 2021 the Lazours released "Flap My Wings: Songs from We Live in Cairo", an album of songs from the show. The songs were largely recorded not by the original cast, but by the Lazours and by popular Arab musicians. "Flap My Wings" and "Genealogy of Revolution" were released as singles prior to the album's release. The album does not present the songs in the order they appear in during the show.

Track listing:

- Genealogy of Revolution (Hamed Sinno)
- Wall Song (Hadi Eldebeck)
- Cairo Street Scenes (Rotana)
- Movement (Jakeim Hart, Parisa Shahmir)
- Loud Voice (Haboya, Mohamed Araki, Mohamed Sharhabil)
- Flap My Wings (The Lazours)
- Living Here (Emel Mathlouthi)
- Each & Every Name (Naseem Alatrash)
- The 18 Days, Pt. 1 (In the Morning) (Original cast)
- The 18 Days, Pt. 2 (A Million People) (Original cast)
- The 18 Days, Pt. 3 (Our Square) (Original cast)
- Tahrir is Now (Ramy Essam)
- Dreaming Words (Demo) (The Lazours)

=== We Live in Cairo (Original Off-Broadway Cast Recording) ===
On October 24, 2025, the official We Live in Cairo Cast Recording was released, featuring the entire cast of the 2024 New York Theatre Workshop production.

==== Act I ====
- "Midnight in Cairo" - Layla, Amir, Ensemble
- "Baba Mubarak's Entrance" - Karim
- "Sharm El Sheikh" - Karim, Amir, Hany
- "Our Way to Happiness" - Fadwa
- "Wall Song I" - Karim, Ensemble
- "Wall Song II (Karim and the police)" - Karim
- "Wall Song III (Hassan erases the mural)" - Hassan
- "Wall Song IV (Hassan meets Karim)" - Hassan, Karim
- "Cairo Street Scenes" - Layla, Ensemble
- "Flap My Wings" - Company
- "Movement" - Amir, Layla
- "The Eighteen Days I" - Company
- "The Eighteen Days II" - Company
- "The Eighteen Days III" - Layla, Ensemble
- "Tahrir Is Now" - Company

==== Act II ====
- "Genealogy of Revolution" - Company
- "Afterparties" - Company
- "The Benevolent Regime of King Farouk II" - Karim, Amir, Layla
- "Wall Song (reprise)" - Hassan
- "Dreaming Words (unfinished)" - Amir
- "I Wake Up With a Melody" - Amir
- "Tahrir Is Now (reprise)" - Amir, Hassan
- "Each and Every Name" - Fadwa
- "Dreaming Words" - Amir, Hany
- "Living Here" - Layla, Ensemble

== Cast ==
	2019 American Repertory Theater	2024 Off-Broadway
Amir	Jakeim Hart	Ali Louis Bourzgui
Fadwa	Dana Saleh Omar	Rotana Tarabzouni
Hany	Abubakr Ali	Michael Khalid Karadsheh
Hassan	Gil Perez-Abraham	Drew Elhamalawy
Karim	Sharif Afifi	John El-Jor
Layla	Parisa Shahmir	Nadina Hassan
Ensemble	Waseem Alzer, Layan Elwazani	

== Reception ==
The 2019 production saw mostly positive reviews from Arab Stages, the Boston Herald, GBH, New York Stage Review, New England Theatre Geek, and TwoCircles. The show received mixed to negative reviews from the Arts Fuse, The Boston Globe, and The Theatre Times. Several reviews felt the show needed a more intimate space than the Loeb Drama Center.

The 2024 production also saw mixed reviews, with many reviews praising the show's design but criticizing its book. Vulture noted "the Lazours have crafted a piece that is long on emotion with melodies that can burn with revolutionary fervor, if at the expense of clarity and structural coherence". New York Stage Review and New York Theatre Guide gave positive reviews of the production, with the latter calling it "timeless and beyond any single movement".

== Awards ==
- 2016: Richard Rodgers Award for Musical Theatre

=== 2024 Off-Broadway production ===
Year	Award	Category	Nominee	Result
2025	Outer Critics Circle Awards	Outstanding New Off-Broadway Musical	We Live in Cairo	Nominated
2025	Outer Critics Circle Awards	Outstanding Featured Performer in an Off-Broadway Musical	Ali Louis Bourzgui	Nominated
2025	Outer Critics Circle Awards	Outstanding Book of a Musical	Daniel Lazour and Patrick Lazour	Nominated
2025	Outer Critics Circle Awards	Outstanding Orchestrations	Daniel Lazour and Michael Starobin	Nominated
