= Rotana Tarabzouni =

Saudi singer, songwriter, and comedian

- Born: 1988 or 1989; Dhahran, Saudi Arabia
- Education: University of Southern California
- Occupations: Singer; songwriter; actress
- Awards: BBC 100 Women (2015)

Rotana Tarabzouni (born 1988 or 1989) is a Saudi singer, songwriter, and comedian based in Los Angeles. In 2015, she was named as one of the BBC 100 Women.

== Early life and education ==
Tarabzouni was born and raised in a fairly liberal family in Dhahran, Saudi Arabia. She enjoyed music and singing from a young age. Although she had restricted access to Western music, her family did listen to a radio station that played American music, as well as artists like The Beatles, Led Zeppelin, Pink Floyd, and Nina Simone. She visited the United States during the summers, and bought CDs during the trips. Tarabzouni initially studied at a Saudi university, and studied abroad in Boston. She later enrolled at the University of Southern California for her master's degree.

== Career ==
After graduating from college, Tarabzouni began working for Saudi Aramco. Although she did well at her job, she found it unfulfilling and decided to quit and pursue music as a career. She subsequently moved to Los Angeles in January 2013 in the hopes of having better access to music venues and record labels. In 2016, Tarabzouni returned to the Middle East to play at NYU Abu Dhabi. In 2020, Tarabzouni performed a one-woman show entitled Alien of Extraordinary Ability (AOEA). The show used both music and spoken word and followed Tarabzouni's journey of moving to the United States to pursue her career. Its run was short lived due to restrictions caused by the COVID-19 pandemic. In 2021, Tarabzouni released a sex education comedy web series called F*D & Blessed. She specifically attempted to address topics frequently overlooked or not spoken about in Muslim and Middle Eastern communities. One episode of the show featured comedian and actress Dina Shihabi.

In 2024, Tarabzouni released the visual EP IBQI إبقي. Later that year, Tarabzouni appeared in the off-Broadway musical We Live in Cairo, for which she was nominated for a 2025 Lucille Lortel Award for Outstanding Ensemble.

=== Controversies ===
Tarabzouni has faced criticism throughout her career for her political views, her choices of dress, and simply her decision to sing in public. In 2013, Tarabzouni filmed a music video with a cover of Lorde's "Team" to bring attention to the Women's Driving Campaign, which aimed to overturn the Saudi government's ban on women drivers; she received death threats in response. Tarabzouni has been criticized for how she has combined her musical performances with religion; during one Arizona performance, for example, she ended her set with a Qur'an recitation, which drew criticism online from those who saw the act as blasphemous.

== Discography ==
=== Albums ===
- Alien of Extraordinary Ability (2021)
- Opening (2023)

=== Singles ===
- "Daddy" (2017)
- "The Cure" (2017)
- "Sin Again" (2020)
- "Stuck in America" (2020)
- "Necessary Death" (2021)
- "Twelve" (2021)
- "Atubu" (2023)
