= Cry Little Sister =

1987 song by Gerard McMahon

Single by Gerard McMahon

from the album The Lost Boys: Original Motion Picture Soundtrack
- Released: 1987
- Studio: Electric Lady, New York City
- Genre: Gothic rock; hard rock; dark wave
- Length: 4:44
- Label: Atlantic
- Songwriters: McMahon; Michael Mainieri
- Producers: McMahon; Mainieri

Gerard McMahon singles chronology
"True to You" (1986)	"Cry Little Sister" (1987)

"Cry Little Sister" is a song written by English singer-songwriter Gerard McMahon (under the pseudonym Gerard McMann) and Michael Mainieri. It was performed by McMahon for the soundtrack to the 1987 film The Lost Boys. The original song failed to chart, although it charted in Australia and the United Kingdom singles chart in 2003 when the track was remixed by the Lost Brothers.

The track has been covered by several other bands. Charlie Sexton cut it for his eponymous album in 1987. Aiden recorded a cover for the soundtrack to the 2008 sequel, Lost Boys: The Tribe and appeared again in the closing credits of Lost Boys: The Thirst (2010). In 2010, Seasons After scored a top twenty hit on Billboard's Mainstream Rock Songs with their version of the track, after it was included on their 2010 album Through Tomorrow. Eight years later, Marilyn Manson released their cover version as a single after it was featured in a promotional trailer for the television series Titans.

In 2021, Glaswegian synth-pop band Chvrches recorded a mellowed out version for the Netflix original film, Nightbooks, a film which also featured the original McMahon release.

== Composition and style ==
Director Joel Schumacher asked English singer-songwriter Gerard McMahon to write a theme for his 1987 film The Lost Boys. The song was predominantly composed by McMahon, who said that its refrain was "brewing in my head with the choir as a chorus backing me. That all seemed to come within half an hour. [Producer] Mike Mainieri had this hypnotic beat, we refined it together and my melody and chords melted right into it. Then I wrote the lyrics within an hour or two [and] recorded the demo".

Despite appearing on the soundtrack to The Lost Boys, the song's lyrics do not specifically reference vampires, as it was composed before McMahon had seen any footage from the film. After hearing the track, director Joel Schumacher commented: "You nailed my theme song to The Lost Boys! I can't believe you wrote this without seeing a frame of film!". McMahon additionally explained: "I always say that if I'd have seen the film first, I would probably not have written 'Cry Little Sister'. I didn't want the song to be specific to the vampire. I wanted it to be about the longing for family from a rejected youth's perspective, which I went through myself and that many of us have felt."

McMahon has denied speculation that the song is about incest, stating in his Twitter account in January 2014: "my song 'Cry Little Sister' is in no way about incest. It's an artful way in which I created a sense of the Vampires [sic] search."

== Recording ==
The song was recorded at Jimi Hendrix's Electric Lady Studios in Greenwich Village in New York City. Twenty young singers from New York recorded the children's choir in the chorus, with each voice being recorded individually so that McMahon could arrange them to get the evocative effect he had heard in his head.

Atlantic Records felt the song was "too futuristic-sounding" and did not fit with what was popular on the radio back then. The label offered to have someone else sing it instead of McMahon, and had singers such as Phil Collins and Steve Perry recording the song, but Schumacher rejected their versions and insisted on keeping McMahon singing his song on The Lost Boys soundtrack.

== Remixes and re-releases ==
The track has been remixed on multiple occasions. It was remixed by The Lost Brothers and issued as a single in 2003 under the title "Cry Little Sister (I Need U Now)", crediting McMahon by the name of his current band, G Tom Mac. The remix peaked at number 21 on the UK Singles Chart, number fourteen in Scotland, and in the top forty of the Australian ARIA Charts. G Tom Mac subsequently released a number of other versions of the song. The "Rebel Angel Remix" was issued on their 2005 EP How to Be Pop, Stupid, Cool, while "Cry Little Sister... Thou Shalt Not (The Mash Up)" was included on the 2007 album Thou Shalt Not Fall. The latter version mashed the original recording with elements of the 2003 remix. A video for "Cry Little Sister (Club Cave Mix)" was produced by DJ Lee and G Tom Mac, and included as a bonus feature on the Lost Boys: The Tribe DVD in 2008. A blues-inspired acoustic rendition was released as a non-album single in 2009, subtitled the "Blood Swamp Version". In 2011, American rock band The Anix released their version of the song as the second single as part of their second full-length studio album Sleepwalker. In 2015, a remix of "Cry Little Sister" was featured on the trailer for the 'Definitive Edition' of the DmC: Devil May Cry video game.

== Formats and track listings ==
- Original 7" single (EU: 789130–7 · UK: A9130)
1. "Cry Little Sister (Theme from The Lost Boys)" – 4:44
2. "I Still Believe" (performed by Tim Cappello) – 3:42
- 2003 CD single (Australia: 674871–2 · Scandinavia: TMC101202 · UK: CENT60CDS)
1. "Cry Little Sister (I Need U Now)" (Edit to Go) – 2:44
2. "U Don't Know Me" (performed by The Lost Brothers) – 8:10
3. "Cry Little Sister (I Need U Now)" (Club Mix) – 8:19
4. "Cry Little Sister (I Need U Now)" (enhanced music video)
- 2004 Maxi-single (Germany: PULSIVE–022)
1. "Cry Little Sister (I Need U Now)" (Original Radio Mix) – 3:43
2. "Cry Little Sister (I Need U Now)" (Steve Murano Remix Edit) – 3:14
3. "Cry Little Sister (I Need U Now)" (Reeloop & Kaylab Remix Edit) – 3:46
4. "Cry Little Sister (I Need U Now)" (Original Club Mix) – 8:22
5. "Cry Little Sister (I Need U Now)" (Steve Murano Remix) – 7:41
6. "Cry Little Sister (I Need U Now)" (Reeloop & Kaylab Remix) – 7:33
- 2009 digital single
1. "Cry Little Sister" (Blood Swamp Version) – 4:13

== Charts ==
Chart performance for "Cry Little Sister (I Need U Now)"
Chart (2003–04)	Peak position
Australia (ARIA)	32
Scotland (OCC)	14
United Kingdom (OCC)	21

== Marilyn Manson cover ==
"Cry Little Sister"

Single by Marilyn Manson
- Released: June 15, 2018
- Genre: Industrial
- Length: 4:34
- Label: Loma Vista
- Songwriters: McMahon; Mainieri
- Producer: Tyler Bates

Marilyn Manson singles chronology
"Kill4Me" (2017)	"Cry Little Sister" (2018)	"God's Gonna Cut You Down" (2019)

Music video
- "Cry Little Sister" on YouTube

Marilyn Manson released a cover version of the song on June 15, 2018. It was set to be the first single taken from the soundtrack to Josh Boone's then upcoming film, The New Mutants. The film was originally scheduled for an April 2018 release, but was then delayed to August 28, 2020. According to Rolling Stone, the eponymous vocalist opted to release the song as originally planned, "rather than keeping [it] under wraps for another year". Despite the delay, Manson's version also appeared in another comic book adaption when it was played in the promo for the 2018 DC TV series Titans. The band had been performing the song live for several months during the "Heaven Upside Down Tour". A one-track digital single was issued on June 15. A music video for the song was released on June 28, and was directed by Bill Yukich, but when The New Mutants soundtrack album was finally released, "Cry Little Sister" did not appear.

=== Charts ===
Chart performance for "Cry Little Sister" by Marilyn Manson
Chart (2018)	Peak position
UK Singles Downloads (Official Charts)	87
US Hot Rock & Alternative Songs (Billboard)	15
US Rock Digital Songs (Billboard)	5
