= The Lost Boys =

1987 film by Joel Schumacher

- Theatrical release poster
- Directed by: Joel Schumacher
- Screenplay by: Janice Fischer; James Jeremias; Jeffrey Boam
- Story by: Janice Fischer; James Jeremias
- Produced by: Harvey Bernhard
- Starring: Corey Feldman; Jami Gertz; Corey Haim; Edward Herrmann; Barnard Hughes; Jason Patric; Kiefer Sutherland; Dianne Wiest
- Cinematography: Michael Chapman
- Edited by: Robert Brown
- Music by: Thomas Newman
- Production company: Richard Donner Production
- Distributed by: Warner Bros.
- Release date: July 31, 1987
- Running time: 97 minutes
- Country: United States
- Language: English
- Budget: $8.5 million
- Box office: $32.5 million

The Lost Boys is a 1987 American comedy horror film directed by Joel Schumacher and written by Jeffrey Boam, Janice Fischer, and James Jeremias. Based on a story by Fischer and Jeremias, it follows two teenage brothers who move with their divorced mother to the fictional California town of Santa Carla, which they discover is a haven for vampires. The film stars Corey Feldman, Jami Gertz, Corey Haim, Edward Herrmann, Barnard Hughes, Jason Patric, Kiefer Sutherland, and Dianne Wiest.

The title is a reference to the Peter Pan and Neverland characters, the Lost Boys, who (like vampires) never grow up. Produced by Harvey Bernhard for the studio Richard Donner Production, with Richard Donner himself serving as executive producer, the film was primarily shot in Santa Cruz, California.

The Lost Boys was released by Warner Bros. Pictures on July 31, 1987, and was a critical and commercial success, grossing $32.5 million on a budget of $8.5 million. It has since been described as a cult classic. Over two decades after its release, it spawned a franchise with two low-budget sequels (Lost Boys: The Tribe and Lost Boys: The Thirst) and two comic book series. A musical adaptation of the movie opened on Broadway in April 2026, winning four Tony Awards and receiving 12 nominations, including Best Musical.

== Plot ==
Teenager Michael Emerson, his younger brother Sam, and their recently divorced mother Lucy move to the seaside town of Santa Carla, California. They live with Lucy's eccentric father, their Grandpa. Lucy takes a job at a video store owned by Max, whom she starts dating. At the local comic book store, Sam meets brothers Edgar and Alan Frog, self-proclaimed vampire hunters who believe vampires have infested the town.

Michael becomes drawn to Star, a beautiful girl he meets on the boardwalk. He notices her spending time with David, the charismatic leader of a local gang that includes Paul, Dwayne, and Marko. Sensing Michael's interest in Star, David challenges him to keep up with them on their motorcycles, leading him to their hideout in a former luxury hotel buried during the 1906 San Francisco earthquake. There, David manipulates Michael's perception, making his food appear as maggots or worms, before offering him a bottle of red liquid. Although Star warns him that it contains blood, Michael drinks it. David's gang leads him to a railway bridge, where they hang suspended over a vast drop, each member letting go and disappearing into the fog. Michael falls, but inexplicably lands safely in his bed.

Michael begins to change; he becomes sensitive to light, finds normal food revolting, and notices his reflection fading. He develops a craving for blood and nearly attacks Sam, but Sam's dog, Nanook, stops him. Sam deduces that he is turning into a vampire. His transformation will only be complete if he feeds on human blood, until then he will remain weak. The transformation can also be reversed if the head vampire is killed. Sam, Edgar, and Alan suspect Max is the head vampire. When he is invited over for dinner by Lucy the boys test their theory, but Max has a reflection and no reaction to garlic or holy water.

David and his gang attempt to push Michael into killing by revealing their true monstrous faces and murdering a group of partygoers at a bonfire. Michael resists the temptation to feed. Afterwards, Star confides in Michael that Laddie, a young member of the gang, and she are also only partly transformed, as they, too, have refused to kill. She admits that David wanted her to kill Michael to complete her transformation. Determined to save her, Michael leads Sam and the Frog brothers to the gang's lair during the day while the vampires are sleeping. They stake and kill Marko, whose pained screams awaken the others. The boys narrowly escape with Star and Laddie, as David vows to hunt them down that night.

Michael, Sam, and the Frog brothers prepare for the gang's impending assault, arming themselves with holy water, garlic, a longbow, and stakes. As night falls, David's gang breaks into the Emerson home. In the chaotic ensuing fight, Sam, Nanook, and the Frog brothers kill Paul and Dwayne, while Michael takes on David. Michael impales him on Grandpa's collection of antlers. Despite David's death, Michael's transformation is not undone, leading the group to realize that David was not the head vampire.

Lucy and Max return home from their date. Spotting David's lifeless body, Max confesses he is the head vampire and reveals he passed the boys' earlier vampire tests because he had been invited into their home, making him immune to those vulnerabilities. Max explains his desire to create a vampire family and that he ordered David to turn Michael and Sam to compel Lucy to join the family as mother to the boys. To save Sam from being killed, Lucy agrees. Before Max can turn her, Grandpa crashes his truck through the wall, impaling Max with a wooden fence post. With Max's death, Michael, Star, and Laddie revert to normal. Grandpa grumbles, "One thing about living in Santa Carla I never could stomach—all the damn vampires."

== Cast ==
- Jason Patric as Michael Emerson
- Corey Haim as Sam Emerson
- Dianne Wiest as Lucy Emerson
- Barnard Hughes as Grandpa
- Edward Herrmann as Max
- Kiefer Sutherland as David
- Jami Gertz as Star
- Corey Feldman as Edgar Frog
- Jamison Newlander as Alan Frog
- Brooke McCarter as Paul
- Billy Wirth as Dwayne
- Alex Winter as Marko
- Chance Michael Corbitt as Laddie
- Alexander Bacan Chapman as Greg
- Nori Morgan as Shelly
- Kelly Jo Minter as Maria
- Tim Cappello as beach concert star

== Production ==
=== Background ===
A March 5, 1985, Variety news item announced that the independent production company Producers Sales Organization (PSO) bought first-time screenwriters Janice Fischer and James Jeremias' Lost Boys script for $400,000 on February 20, 1985. PSO announced their acquisition of the project at the American Film Market in 1985. Warner Bros. Pictures later joined the project, taking over domestic distribution and some foreign territories.

The film's title is a reference to the characters featured in J. M. Barrie's Peter Pan stories, who—like vampires—never grow old. Jeremias said, "I had read Anne Rice's Interview with the Vampire, and in that there was a 200-year-old vampire trapped in the body of a 12-year-old girl. Since Peter Pan had been one of my all-time favourite stories, I thought, 'What if the reason Peter Pan came out at night and never grew up and could fly was because he was a vampire?'" According to academic William Patrick Day, the central theme of The Lost Boys, "organized around loose allusions to Peter Pan", is the tension surrounding the Emerson family and the world of contemporary adolescence.

The film was originally set to be directed by Richard Donner, and Fischer and Jeremias' screenplay was modeled on Donner's recent film The Goonies (1985). In this way the film was envisioned as more of a juvenile vampire adventure with 13 or 14-year-old vampires, while the Frog brothers were "chubby 8 year-old Cub Scouts" and the character of Star was a young boy. When Donner committed to other projects, Joel Schumacher was approached to direct the film, although Donner eventually received credit as an executive producer. He came up with the idea of making the film sexier and more adult, bringing on screenwriter Jeffrey Boam to retool the script and raise the ages of the characters.

=== Casting ===
Schumacher said he had "one of the greatest [casts] in the world. They are what make the film." Most of the younger cast members were relatively unknown. Schumacher and Marion Dougherty met with many candidates. Jason Patric was approached early on by Schumacher to play Michael Emerson, but Patric had no interest in doing a vampire film, and turned it down "many times". Eventually, he was won over by Schumacher's vision and his promise to allow the cast "creative input" in making the film. According to Kiefer Sutherland, Patric "was really instrumental" in adapting the script with Schumacher and shaping the film.

Schumacher envisioned the character of Star as being a waifish blonde, similar to Meg Ryan, but he was convinced by Jason Patric to consider Jami Gertz, who had just worked with Patric in Solarbabies (1986). Schumacher was impressed, but only at Patric's insistence did he finally cast Gertz. Schumacher was surprised when his first choice for the role of Lucy, Dianne Wiest, accepted the role, as she had just recently won the Academy Award for Best Supporting Actress for Hannah and Her Sisters (1986) at the 59th Academy Awards.

After seeing Kiefer Sutherland's portrayal of Tim in At Close Range, Schumacher arranged a reading with him at which they got on very well. Sutherland had just completed work on Stand by Me when he was offered the role of David. Schumacher said Sutherland "can do almost anything. He's a born character actor. You can see it in The Lost Boys. He has the least amount of dialogue in the movie, but his presence is extraordinary."

=== Principal photography ===
Most of the film was shot in Santa Cruz, California, starting on June 2, 1986, and ending on June 23, 1986, after 21 days of filming. Locations include the Santa Cruz Boardwalk, the Pogonip open space preserve, and the surrounding Santa Cruz Mountains. Other locations included a cliffside on the Palos Verdes Peninsula in Los Angeles County, used for the entrance to the vampire cave, and a valley in Santa Clarita near Magic Mountain, where introductory shots were filmed for the scene where Michael and the Lost Boys hang from a railway bridge. Stage sets included the vampire cave, built on Stage 12 of the Warner Bros. lot, and a recreation of the interior and exterior of the Pogonip clubhouse on Stage 15, which stood in for Grandpa's house.

Sutherland broke his right wrist while doing a wheelie on his motorcycle and had to wear gloves on set to conceal the cast. His motorcycle for the movie was adapted so he could operate it with his left hand only.

== Reception ==
=== Box office ===
The Lost Boys opened at number two during its opening weekend, with a domestic gross over $5.2 million. It went on to gross a domestic total over $32.2 million against an $8.5 million budget.

=== Critical response ===
On the review aggregator website Rotten Tomatoes, the film holds an approval rating of 75% based on 80 reviews, with an average rating of 6.4/10. The website's critics consensus reads, "Flawed but eminently watchable, Joel Schumacher's teen vampire thriller blends horror, humor, and plenty of visual style with standout performances from a cast full of young 1980s stars." On Metacritic, it has a weighted average score of 63 out of 100 based on 16 critics, indicating "generally favorable reviews". Audiences surveyed by CinemaScore gave the film an average grade of "A−" on an A+ to F scale.

Roger Ebert gave the film two-and-a-half out of four stars, praising the cinematography and "a cast that's good right down the line", but ultimately describing Lost Boys as a triumph of style over substance and "an ambitious entertainment that starts out well, but ends up selling its soul." Caryn James of The New York Times called Dianne Wiest's character a "dopey mom" and Barnard Hughes's character "a caricature of a feisty old Grandpa." She found the film more of a comedy than a horror and the finale "funny".

Elaine Showalter commented that "the film brilliantly portrays vampirism as a metaphor for the kind of mythic male bonding that resists growing up, commitment, especially marriage." Variety panned the film, calling it "a horrifically dreadful vampire teensploitation entry that daringly advances the theory that all those missing children pictured on garbage bags and milk cartons are actually the victims of bloodsucking bikers."

The film won a Saturn Award for Best Horror Film at the 15th Saturn Awards in 1987.

=== Cultural influence ===
The Lost Boys has been credited with helping shift depictions of vampires in popular culture and bringing a more youthful, sexier appeal to the vampire genre. This inspired subsequent films like Buffy the Vampire Slayer (1992). The scene in which David transforms noodles into worms was directly referenced in the 2014 vampire mockumentary film What We Do in the Shadows. The film inspired the song of the same name by the Finnish gothic rock band the 69 Eyes from their 2004 album Devils.

Themes and practical effects from the movie are referenced in the lyrics and music video of Gunship's 2018 "Dark All Day". Tim Cappello, who performed the song "I Still Believe" on the Lost Boys soundtrack, collaborated on the Gunship track. Cappello appears in the film as lead performer at the beach concert (vocals and saxophone).

The music video for "Into the Summer", a song released by American rock band Incubus on August 23, 2019, pays homage to the film.

Event organizer Monopoly Events created "the biggest Lost Boys reunion ever" in 2019 at their annual horror fan convention, For the Love of Horror, which included Kiefer Sutherland, Jason Patric, Alex Winter, Jamison Newlander, and Billy Wirth along with musicians from the film G Tom Mac and Tim Cappello, who were reunited for the first time in over 30 years. G Tom Mac and Tim Cappello performed separate live music sets on the event stage to a vast crowd of fans on both days of the event, while Cappello performed a third time at the event after-party. The actors posed together for photographs in a purpose-built cave set modeled on the vampire cave seen in The Lost Boys film, which was complete with a poster of Jim Morrison, a bottle of fake blood and David the vampire's wheelchair. The group reunited once again at the 2023 event, and this time, Jason Patric gave a live commentary during a closed screening of the film in the venue.

The Frog brothers make a cameo in Jenny Colgan's 2001 novel Looking for Andrew McCarthy, in which they are now police officers and make a brief, ominous reference to their past work with "the supernatural".

== Home media ==
The film was released on VHS on February 24, 1988, by Warner Home Video. It was released on DVD in January 1998. In August 2004, the film received a special-edition two-disc release, which contained an audio commentary from Schumacher, deleted scenes, and making-of featurettes. The film was issued on Blu-ray in July 2008. For the film's 35th anniversary in September 2022, it was released as a 4K Blu-ray SteelBook, in tandem with Poltergeist (1982). The release includes special features ported from the 2008 edition.

== Adaptations ==
=== Novelization ===
Due to his past fantasy novels and horror short stories, Craig Shaw Gardner was given a copy of the script and asked to write a novelization to accompany the film's release. At the time, Gardner was, like the Frog brothers, managing a comic-book store, as well as writing.

The novelization released in paperback by Berkley Publishing is 220 pages long. It includes several scenes later dropped from the film, such as Michael working as a trash collector for money to buy his leather jacket. It expands the roles of the opposing gang, the Surf Nazis, who were seen as nameless victims of the vampires in the film. It includes several tidbits of vampire lore, such as not being able to cross running water and salt sticking to their forms.

=== Comic books ===
David made a reappearance in the 2008 comic-book series Lost Boys: Reign of Frogs, which serves as a sequel to the first film and a prequel to Lost Boys: The Tribe.

In October 2016, Vertigo released a comic-book miniseries, The Lost Boys, wherein Michael, Sam, and the Frog brothers must protect Star from her sisters, the Blood Belles.

=== Broadway musical ===
A musical adaptation, with music and lyrics by The Rescues and directed by Michael Arden, opened in April 2026 at the Palace Theatre. Reviews ranged from favorable to mixed. The show received twelve Tony Award nominations and won four - Shoshana Bean for Best Supporting Actress in a Musical, Ali Louis Bourzgui for Best Supporting Actor in a Musical, Best Scenic Design of a Musical, and Best Lighting Design of a Musical.

== Sequels ==
Kiefer Sutherland's character, David, was impaled on antlers, but does not explode or dissolve as do the other vampires. He was intended to have survived, which would be picked up in a sequel, The Lost Girls. Scripts for this and other sequels circulated over the years; Joel Schumacher made several attempts at a sequel during the 1990s, but nothing came to fruition.

A direct-to-DVD sequel, Lost Boys: The Tribe, was released in 2008. Corey Feldman returned as Edgar Frog, with a cameo by Corey Haim as Sam Emerson. Kiefer Sutherland's half-brother Angus Sutherland played the lead vampire, Shane Powers.

A third film, Lost Boys: The Thirst, was released on DVD on October 12, 2010. Feldman served as an executive producer in addition to playing Edgar Frog, and Newlander returned as Alan Frog. Haim, who was not slated to be part of the cast, died in March 2010. A fourth film was discussed, as well as a Frog brothers television series, but with the dissolution of Warner Premiere, the projects never materialized.

In September 2021, a new film was announced, to be directed by Jonathan Entwistle, from a script by Randy McKinnon, starring Noah Jupe and Jaeden Martell.

== Soundtrack ==
The Lost Boys: Original Motion Picture Soundtrack
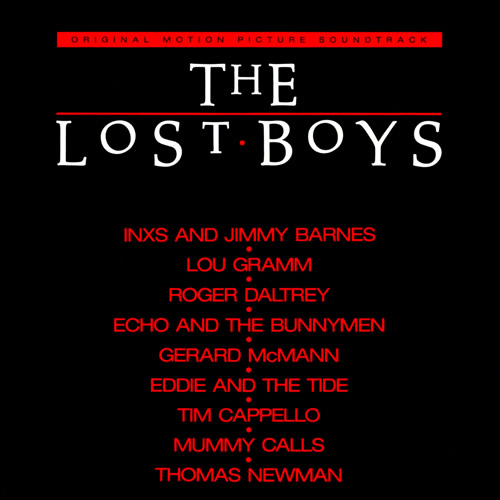

Soundtrack album by various artists
- Released: July 31, 1987
- Genre: Soundtrack
- Length: 43:45
- Label: Atlantic
- Producer: Various

Singles from Lost boys soundtrack
- 1. "Good Times" Released: December 8, 1986 (Aus.); 2. "Cry Little Sister" Released: 1987; 3. "Lost in the Shadows" Released: 1987; 4. "People Are Strange" Released: 1988

Professional ratings
Review scores
Source	Rating
AllMusic	3/5 stars
PopMatters	Favorable

Thomas Newman wrote the original score as an eerie blend of orchestra and organ arrangements.

The music soundtrack contains a number of notable songs and several covers, including "Good Times", a duet between INXS and former Cold Chisel lead singer Jimmy Barnes which reached No. 2 on the Australian charts. This cover version of a 1960s Australian song by the Easybeats was originally recorded to promote the Australian Made tour of Australia in early 1987, headlined by INXS and Barnes.

Tim Cappello's cover of the Call's "I Still Believe" was featured in the film and on the soundtrack. Cappello makes a cameo appearance in the film playing the song at the Santa Cruz boardwalk, with his saxophone and bodybuilder muscles on display. Cappello frequently appears at fan conventions to perform the song.

The soundtrack features a cover version of the Doors' song "People Are Strange" by Echo & the Bunnymen. The song as featured in the film is an alternate, shortened version with a slightly different music arrangement.

Lou Gramm, lead singer of Foreigner, recorded "Lost in the Shadows" for the soundtrack, along with a video, which featured clips from the film.

The theme song, "Cry Little Sister", was originally recorded by Gerard McMahon (under his pseudonym Gerard McMann) for the soundtrack, and later re-released on his album G Tom Mac in 2000. In the film's sequel Lost Boys: The Tribe, "Cry Little Sister" was covered by a Seattle-based rock band, Aiden and appeared again in the closing credits of Lost Boys: The Thirst.

"The Lost Boys" Soundtrack album was certified Gold by the RIAA on September 30, 1987.

=== Album ===
1. "Good Times" by Jimmy Barnes and INXS – 3:49 (The Easybeats)
2. "Lost in the Shadows (The Lost Boys)" by Lou Gramm – 6:17
3. "Don't Let the Sun Go Down on Me" by Roger Daltrey – 6:09 (Elton John/Bernie Taupin)
4. "Laying Down the Law" by Jimmy Barnes and INXS – 4:24
5. "People Are Strange" by Echo & the Bunnymen – 3:36 (The Doors)
6. "Cry Little Sister (Theme from The Lost Boys)" by Gerard McMann – 4:46
7. "Power Play" by Eddie & the Tide – 3:57
8. "I Still Believe" by Tim Cappello – 3:42 (The Call)
9. "Beauty Has Her Way" by Mummy Calls – 3:56
10. "To the Shock of Miss Louise" by Thomas Newman – 1:21

=== Charts ===
1987–1988 chart performance for The Lost Boys
Chart (1987–1988)	Peak position
Australian Albums (ARIA)	44
Canada Top Albums/CDs (RPM)	41
US Billboard 200	15

1995 chart performance for The Lost Boys
Chart (1995)	Peak position
Scottish Albums (Official Charts)	84

2020 chart performance for The Lost Boys
Chart (2020)	Peak position
UK Album Downloads (Official Charts)	49
UK Compilation Albums (Official Charts)	13
UK Soundtrack Albums (Official Charts)	2

=== Certifications ===
Certifications for The Lost Boys soundtrack
Region	Certification	Certified units/sales
Australia (ARIA)	2× Platinum	140,000^{^}
^{^} Shipments figures based on certification alone.
