= Ali Louis Bourzgui =

American actor and singer (born 1999)

- Born: August 31, 1999 (age 27); Cambridge, Massachusetts, U.S.
- Education: Ithaca College (BFA)
- Occupations: Actor and singer
- Years active: 2021–present

Ali Louis Bourzgui (born August 31, 1999) is an American actor and singer known for his roles in musical theater, particularly on the Broadway stages. He won the Tony Award for Best Featured Actor in a Musical for his performance in The Lost Boys (2026).

== Early life and education ==
Bourzgui was born in Cambridge, Massachusetts, and raised in Pittsfield; his mother would take him "to a couple of Broadway shows a year". His father is Moroccan-American, and his mother is Italian–Irish American. Bourzgui originally planned to become an environmental engineer or ornithologist, but was inspired by the works of "Joe Iconis, Mark Ruffalo, and Kimberly Akimbo" to pursue an acting career. He graduated with a Bachelor of Fine Arts from Ithaca College.

== Career ==
In October 2021, a few months after graduating from Ithaca, Bourzgui made his professional debut in the first national tour of The Band's Visit, joining first as a swing, and eventually taking over the role of Haled. Following a 2023 tryout run in Chicago, Bourzgui made his Broadway debut in the titular role in the 2024 Broadway revival of The Who's Tommy, a performance for which he received a Theatre World Award, and a Drama League Distinguished Performance Award nomination. In 2025, he starred as Orpheus in the Broadway production of Hadestown. In 2026, he originated the role of David in a musical adaptation of The Lost Boys. For his portrayal, he won the Tony Award for Best Featured Actor in a Musical.

== Personal life ==
Bourzgui is Muslim. He is in the folk band Resident Lightweight along with Joey D’Amore. They released their debut album, Becomes a Home, in 2025.

He is currently in a relationship with fellow Broadway actor Tassy Kirbas, who worked with him in the 30th anniversary revival of The Who's Tommy in Chicago and on Broadway.

== Theatre credits ==
Year	Production	Role	Venue	Ref.
2021–2022	The Band's Visit	Ensemble/Haled	North American Tour	
2023	Fun Home	Roy/Mark/Pete/Bobby Jeremy	TheaterWorks Hartford, Regional	
2023	Layalina	Young Mazin/Yousif	Goodman Theatre, Regional	
2023	The Who's Tommy	Tommy	Goodman Theatre, Regional	
2023–2024	Company	Paul	US National Tour	
2024	The Who's Tommy	Tommy	Nederlander Theatre, Broadway	
2024	We Live in Cairo	Amir	New York Theatre Workshop, Off-Broadway	
2025	Hadestown	Orpheus	Walter Kerr Theatre, Broadway	
2025	Sweet Smell of Success	Sidney Falco	MasterVoices, Concert	
2026	The Lost Boys	David	Palace Theatre, Broadway	

== Awards and nominations ==
Year	Award	Category	Work	Result	Ref.
2024	Outer Critics Circle Award	Outstanding Lead Performer in a Broadway Musical	The Who's Tommy	Nominated	
2024	Drama League Award	Distinguished Performance	The Who's Tommy	Nominated	
2024	Theatre World Award	Outstanding Debut	The Who's Tommy	Won	
2025	Outer Critics Circle Award	Outstanding Featured Performer in an Off-Broadway Musical	We Live in Cairo	Nominated	
2026	Outer Critics Circle Award	Outstanding Featured Performer in a Broadway Musical	The Lost Boys	Nominated	
2026	Drama League Award	Distinguished Performance	The Lost Boys	Nominated	
2026	Tony Award	Best Featured Actor in a Musical	The Lost Boys	Won	
2026	Dorian Award	Outstanding Featured Performance in a Broadway Musical	The Lost Boys	Nominated	
2026	Broadway.com Audience Choice Awards	Favorite Featured Actor in a Musical	The Lost Boys	Nominated	
2027	Grammy Awards	Best Musical Theater Album	The Lost Boys	Pending	
