= Jamison Newlander =

American actor (born 1970)

- Born: Jamison Bret Newlander; April 2, 1970 (age 56); New York City, U.S.
- Occupations: Actor, Writer
- Years active: 1987–present
- Spouse: Hanny Landau (m. 2002)
- Children: 2

Jamison Bret Newlander (born April 2, 1970) is an American actor. He starred in the 1987 horror film The Lost Boys, playing vampire hunter Alan Frog.

== Career ==
Newlander is best known for his role as Alan Frog, one of the two vampire-hunting Frog brothers, in The Lost Boys (1987), alongside Corey Feldman. He reprises his role as Alan Frog in Lost Boys: The Thirst (2010), as he and Feldman fight side-by-side again for what's been celebrated as the return of the Frog Brothers. Newlander appeared as Alan Frog in one of the alternative endings for Lost Boys: The Tribe (2008).

He played alongside River Phoenix in a TV movie, Circle of Violence: A Family Drama, and Jason Bateman in Valerie. He appeared in the 1988 remake of The Blob. He starred in two commercials during the 1980s, for Pearle Vision and AT&T in 1984 and 1987 respectively.

A graduate of Beverly Hills High School, where he was active in the Performing Arts Department, he earned a BFA in acting at NYU, and acted on stages in New York, Vermont, Kentucky and California throughout his 20s. While doing theater, Newlander began writing and became an award-winning playwright with his 1996 play Remember This at Actors Theatre of Louisville. He put all of his talents together, writing, directing and acting, for his film Rooster, which played on the film festival circuit, most notably at the Hamptons International Film Festival in 2003.

In 2009, wrote, produced, directed and starred in a second short film titled Room Service. He made cameo appearances in both seasons of The Two Coreys, a reality TV show starring Lost Boys co-stars Corey Haim and Corey Feldman on A&E Network. Since then, he has played small roles in multiple movies, including Bone Tomahawk, alongside Kurt Russell. Newlander created Wikisoap, the first ever user-created soap opera on the web. He is currently working on his play, The Virtual Adventures of Riff-Cat Polito.

He had a cameo appearance as a police officer in The Tale of Two Coreys, the Lifetime movie documenting the lives of Corey Haim and Corey Feldman. In 2010, he reprised his role as Alan Frog in Lost Boys: The Thirst.

Newlander co-hosted a short bi-weekly podcast called The Jamison Newlander and Some Other Guy Show with an unidentified co-host. The podcast included regular updates on Newlander's life and career, as well as comedy sketches, celebrity guests, and casual conversation. It was released every second Sunday, but as of May 7, 2017, is on extended hiatus, although previous episodes remain available. Newlander is working on an upcoming second podcast titled Current Frequencies, a collection of original 20-30 minute radio-dramas based on contemporary issues.

== Personal life ==
Newlander was born on April 2, 1970, in New York City. He is the youngest of a Jewish family with Italian descent, with two older sisters. His parents divorced when he was two years old.

In 2002, he married fellow actress Hanny Landau. They have two sons.

== Filmography ==
Year	Film	Role	Notes
1986	Circle of Violence: A Family Drama	Boy	credited as Jamie Jamison
1986	Valerie	Hyena	credited as Jamie Jamison
1987	The Lost Boys	Alan Frog	
1988	The Blob	Anthony	
2003	Rooster	Alexander	self-made short
2008	Lost Boys: The Tribe	Alan Frog	scenes deleted
2009	Room Service	Don	self-made short
2010	Lost Boys: The Thirst	Alan Frog	
2012	Young Blood: Evil Intentions	Mayor	
2015	Sky Harbor	Dr Stone	
2015	Bone Tomahawk	Mayor	
2017	Love's Last Resort	Jacques	
2018	A Tale of Two Coreys	Police officer	Lifetime TV Movie
