= The Lost Boys (comic book) =

2016 comic book by Vertigo Comics

Publication information
- Publisher: Vertigo
- Format: Limited series
- No. of issues: 6

The Lost Boys is a 2016 comic book series published by Vertigo Comics. It is a sequel to the 1987 vampire film The Lost Boys.

== Plot ==
Michael, Sam and the Frog Brothers must protect Star from her sisters, the Blood Belles.
