= Lost Boys: The Thirst =

- DVD cover
- Directed by: Dario Piana
- Screenplay by: Evan Charnov; Hans Rodionoff
- Story by: Evan Charnov
- Based on: Characters by Janice Fischer; James Jeremias
- Produced by: Basil Iwanyk; Phillip B. Goldfine; David Wicht
- Starring: Corey Feldman; Jamison Newlander; Casey B. Dolan; Tanit Phoenix
- Cinematography: Stefano Morcaldo
- Edited by: Tony Solomons
- Music by: Elia Cmiral
- Production companies: Thunder Road Pictures; Hollywood Media Bridge; Film Afrika; ApolloMovie
- Distributed by: Warner Bros. Pictures (Note: Released under Warner Premiere label.)
- Release date: October 12, 2010
- Running time: 81 minutes
- Country: United States
- Language: English

Lost Boys: The Thirst is a 2010 American black comedy action horror film directed by Dario Piana and stars Corey Feldman, Casey B. Dolan, Tanit Phoenix and Jamison Newlander. It is a sequel to Lost Boys: The Tribe (2008) and the third and final film of The Lost Boys trilogy.

== Plot ==
In Washington, D.C., Edgar and Alan Frog confront a half-vampire Senator who kills a Congressman, leading to Alan being forced to drink vampire blood. Five years later in San Cazador, California, Edgar faces eviction and is approached by Gwen Lieber, seeking help to rescue her brother Peter, who has been kidnapped during a rave, suspecting vampiric involvement. She offers him money and gives him a drug called "Thirst," which is vampire blood.

Edgar seeks Alan's help, but he refuses. Edgar decides to proceed alone, enlisting the help of Lars von Goetz, a former reality star. Edgar visits the grave of his childhood friend Sam, returning a comic book to him, and learns from Zoe about a ritual sacrifice during a Blood Moon at the rave.

Edgar and Zoe gear up with weapons from Congressman Blake and head to the island rave to find Peter, leaving Gwen behind for safety. During the chaos, Lars is killed, and Edgar is injured but continues fighting. DJ X is preparing to sacrifice Peter, but Alan arrives, and together they defeat DJ X.

They discover Peter is the real alpha vampire and Gwen's mission was a ruse to manipulate Edgar. Peter kills Gwen and commands the vampires to attack Edgar, but Edgar sprays Peter with normal water blesses it and it destroys Peter, returning everyone else to normal. The story concludes with Edgar and Zoe reflecting on their adventure, hinting at the revelation of her being a werewolf.

== Cast ==
- Corey Feldman as Edgar Frog
- Casey B. Dolan as Zoe
- Tanit Phoenix as Gwen Lieber
- Jamison Newlander as Alan Frog
- Seb Castang as DJ X
- Felix Mosse as Peter
- Stephen Van Niekerk as Lars von Goetz
- Joe Vaz as Claus
- Hennie Bosman as Kirk O'Dale
- Tanya van Graan as Lily
- Ingrida Kraus as Vixen
- Sean Michael as Ira Pinkus
- Matthew Dylan Roberts as Congressman Blake
- Porteus Xandau Steenkamp as Johnny Trash
- Corey Haim as Sam Emerson (uncredited; clips from the first film)

== Production ==
Filming began on location in South Africa in November 2009. Corey Haim had originally confirmed that he would not be participating in the film, citing a very busy schedule. He had said he was looking forward to coming back for a fourth film, before his death in March 2010. The film is dedicated to Haim in the end credits. It is the second sequel to the original 1987 film The Lost Boys, following Lost Boys: The Tribe. In this sequel, Corey Feldman and Jamison Newlander reprise their roles as Edgar and Alan Frog.

== Release ==
Warner Premiere set the DVD and Blu-ray release for October 12, 2010. It was less successful than the previous film, only earning $907,122 within the first 2 weeks of release while The Tribe had earned $3,548,278

== Reception ==
The film received negative reviews from critics and, based on 6 reviews, currently holds a 0% on Rotten Tomatoes with an average rating of 3.42 out of 10.

== See also ==
- Vampire film
