= Angus Sutherland (actor) =

American actor and producer (born 1982)

- Born: Angus Redford Sutherland; September 3, 1982 (age 44); Los Angeles, California, U.S.
- Occupations: Producer; actor
- Years active: 2005–present
- Parents: Donald Sutherland; Francine Racette
- Relatives: Rossif Sutherland (brother); Kiefer Sutherland (half-brother); Sarah Sutherland (half-niece)

Angus Sutherland (born September 3, 1982) is a Canadian-American film executive, producer and actor. He is the chief executive officer of STX Entertainment and chief operating officer of Film Finances International.

== Biography ==
Angus Sutherland is the third son of actor Donald Sutherland and Francine Racette. He is the younger brother of Roeg and Rossif Sutherland as well as the half-brother of Kiefer Sutherland and Kiefer's twin sister, Rachel.

His father Donald Sutherland gave him the middle name Redford in honor of Robert Redford, who had directed Donald in Ordinary People.

Sutherland graduated from Middlebury College.

== Filmography ==
- Familiar Strangers (2008)
- Harold & Kumar Escape from Guantanamo Bay (2008)
- Lost Boys: The Tribe (2008)
- Undefeated (2011)
- Foo Fighters: Back and Forth (2011)
- Tiebreaker (2015)
- November Criminals (2016)
- Kidnap (2017)
- 1917 (2019)

== Television work ==
- Commander in Chief (2005)
- Dollhouse (2009)
