= Lost Boys: The Tribe =

2008 film by P. J. Pesce

- Home video release poster
- Directed by: P. J. Pesce
- Written by: Hans Rodionoff
- Based on: Characters by Janice Fischer; James Jeremias
- Produced by: Basil Iwanyk; Phillip B. Goldfine
- Starring: Tad Hilgenbrink; Angus Sutherland; Autumn Reeser; Corey Feldman
- Cinematography: Barry Donlevy
- Edited by: Amanda I. Kitpaul
- Music by: Nathan Barr
- Production companies: Thunder Road Pictures; Hollywood Media Bridge
- Distributed by: Warner Bros. Pictures (Note: Released under the Warner Premiere label.)
- Release date: July 29, 2008
- Running time: 93 minutes
- Country: United States
- Language: English

Lost Boys: The Tribe is a 2008 American black comedy horror film directed by P. J. Pesce, which serves as a sequel to the 1987 film, The Lost Boys. The film stars Tad Hilgenbrink, Angus Sutherland, Autumn Reeser and Corey Feldman.

The film is followed by a sequel, Lost Boys: The Thirst (2010).

== Plot ==
Chris Emerson, a young former surfing pro and his younger sister Nicole move to Luna Bay, California, following the death of their parents, to live in a house owned by their aunt Jillian. Chris leaves his address at the home of Edgar Frog, the town's surfboard shaper, in hopes of getting a job. Chris is approached at their new home by former pro surfer Shane Powers, who invites him to a party that night.

Chris and Nicole go to the party, where Shane and his friends Kyle, Erik, and Jon entertain themselves with the guests. Chris showers with a girl named Lisa, and Shane gets Nicole alone, chats with her for a bit, and then tricks her into drinking his blood. When Chris learns that Nicole has been with Shane, he angrily and protectively takes her home, where she begins to manifest vampiric strength and rage. But before Nicole can kill Chris, she is knocked out by Edgar, who reveals that he is a vampire hunter, and Nicole has been infected with vampirism. Chris throws Edgar out of the house. Then, Lisa shows up and pretends to chat with Chris for a bit before she finally tries to seduce and feed on him. In fending her off, he somehow impales her on a mounted rack of antlers, with the body eventually becoming petrified before an explosion ensues.

Finally convinced of the situation, Chris seeks Edgar's help. Edgar explains that Nicole is only half-vampire and will remain that way unless she feeds, and she can be turned human again if they kill the head vampire before that. Chris interrupts her just before she can feed on 22-year-old Evan Monroe, a nice young man who has been courting her, and explains what is happening to her, and Nicole is surprised at what she almost did (because she believes herself to be a vegetarian). However, Shane draws her to their lair, and they have sex.

Chris and Edgar - who lost an unnamed sibling to the vampires - plot for Chris to "join" the tribe of vampires in order to learn the location of their lair. He drinks Shane's blood and begins to develop vampire traits, but when the tribe (minus Shane and Nicole) feed on a group of girls, he refuses and kills Jon by impaling him with a stick in self-defense. Edgar joins him, and they go to the lair, killing Erik and Kyle. Chris impales Erik with a large drill, and Edgar kills Kyle by making his head explode with a holy water balloon.

Meanwhile, Shane goads Nicole to kill Evan, whom they have bound and gagged for her, but she refuses. With Chris' help, she impales Shane with a stake. Just as Shane attempts to pull Nicole onto the stake with him, Chris appears with a sword and decapitates him with it, returning them both to normal. They thank Edgar, who promises to bill them for his services, and Evan takes the opportunity to ask Nicole for a date. They are confronted by their aunt at home, who believes they have been doing drugs and promises zero tolerance.

In a mid-credits scene, Edgar encounters Sam Emerson, now a vampire. They exchange some dialogue and charge at each other as the credits resume.

=== Alternate endings ===
- In one alternate ending, Edgar is cleaning up after the vampire hunt when Sam Emerson (who is not a vampire) knocks on his door. Sam warns him that his brother Alan is coming to settle the score. Edgar is reluctant to accept Sam's help, but Sam insists he needs it. The scene ends with vampiric Alan and a female companion driving wildly to confront Edgar.
- Another alternate ending is a slightly extended version of the first, but with Sam wearing black sunglasses and showing Edgar bite marks on his neck.

== Cast ==
- Tad Hilgenbrink as Chris Emerson
- Angus Sutherland as Shane Powers
- Autumn Reeser as Nicole Emerson
- Corey Feldman as Edgar Frog
- Gabrielle Rose as Aunt Jillian
- Shaun Sipos as Kyle
- Merwin Mondesir as Erik
- Kyle Cassie as Jon
- Moneca Delain as Lisa
- Greyston Holt as Evan Monroe
- Tom Savini as David Van Etten
- Daryl Shuttleworth as McGraw
- Sarah Smyth as Hayden
- Alexander Calvert as Grom
- Corey Haim as Sam Emerson (during closing credits)
- Jamison Newlander as Alan Frog (deleted scenes)

== Development ==
Plans for a sequel to The Lost Boys had been in varying stage of development since the release of the original film. The director of the original film Joel Schumacher had wanted to do a sequel called The Lost Girls before the announcement of The Tribe, a film in which he had no input and did not believe should be made. In addition, a script called Lost Boys: Devil May Cry was also considered.

=== Script ===
Hans Rodionoff originally wrote a script about surfing werewolves titled The Tribe which was turned down by studios including Warner Bros. for its resemblance to The Lost Boys. Warner Bros. studio executives changed their mind when they decided on a sequel, who then persuaded Rodionoff to alter the script as a sequel, including changing the werewolves of the original to vampires.

=== Casting ===
Corey Feldman returns to play the role of one of the vampire slaying "Frog Brothers", Edgar but was initially reluctant to participate in the sequel. Newcomer Greyston Holt, as Evan, finds himself up against the vampire horde after he becomes close to the object of the head vampire's affection, Reeser. Merwin Mondesir, Shaun Sipos, and Kyle Cassie have been cast as the vampires led by Angus Sutherland's character, Shane. Moneca Delain has also been added to the cast.

Said Feldman on the film: "Warner Bros. has further developed the script — they brought on a great writer, Hans Rodionoff, who came up with a great story line. In the script, as it is today, I am one of the leads. My involvement is very close to what my involvement was in the first one. So I'm pretty much scattered throughout. Edgar was always an outcast, but here his close-knit family have drifted apart. They've had a major problem, and because of that problem, Edgar today is working alone. The film is about him trying to still carry the torch as it were, without the aid and assistance of his partners. That leaves him in an even lonelier and even more delicate place than he was in the first film being the outsider that he already was."

In an interview with Fangoria, Tom Savini said the following in regards to his role in the film: "I'm one of the first vampires you see in the movie, I'm a surfer who runs into the vampires at the beginning of the film, in a sequence that is shot very Sergio Leone-style. They're shooting The Tribe in Vancouver right now, and I'll be there September 11."

Jason Patric, who portrayed Michael in the first film, was rumored to be returning to the role for a small scene in the sequel; however, this was debunked in MTV's August 28, 2007, interview with Corey Feldman. Corey Haim briefly reprises his role as Sam Emerson, but only appears following a portion of the film's final credits, and in the two nearly identical alternative endings. Jamison Newlander is also listed in the film's credits, although he only appears very briefly as Alan Frog in the two alternative endings.

=== Production ===
The film was filmed in Canada from August to September 2007.

== Music ==
Lost Boys: The Tribe (Music from and Inspired by the Motion Picture)

Soundtrack album by Various Artists
- Released: July 22, 2008
- Genre: Soundtrack
- Length: 1:02:44
- Label: Adrenaline

Nathan Barr composed the original score for the film. A soundtrack of songs by various artists was released by Adrenaline Records on July 22, 2008. The album includes a cover version of "Cry Little Sister" by Aiden.

=== Track listing ===
1. Aiden - "Cry Little Sister" (5:23)
2. Airbourne - "Too Much, Too Young, Too Fast" (3:42)
3. Eagles of Death Metal - "Don't Speak (I Came to Make a Bang)" (2:48)
4. Yeah Whatever - "Summertime" (3:38)
5. Seether - "Burrito" (live acoustic) (4:02)
6. Dave Gahan - "Kingdom" (4:34)
7. G. Love & Special Sauce - "Long Way Down" (4:10)
8. PJ & The Chile Rellenos - "Wish You Were Here" (3:16)
9. Starsailor - "In My Blood" (3:55)
10. The Von Bondies - "Only to Haunt You" (3:16)
11. Blind Melon - "For My Friends" (2:45)
12. The Hold Steady - "Knuckles" (3:47)
13. Styles of Beyond - "Nine Thou" (Grant Mohrman Superstars remix) (4:03)
14. Hindu Kush - "Day Fire" (4:05)
15. Jackpot - "Dizzy" (4:49)
16. Nathan Barr - "Suite" (4:32)

== Reception ==
The film was Warner Premiere's highest selling DVD release of 2008, performing so impressively that Warner immediately greenlit a third installment. It covered its $5 million production cost in its first three weeks of release. As of January 2011, it has sold over 1,250,000 copies, a record for a direct-to-DVD release.

Despite the success of the DVD, the film received poor reviews. It currently has a 0% on Rotten Tomatoes based on 7 reviews, with an average rating of 2.85/10.

== Sequel ==
The third film, Lost Boys: The Thirst, was directed by Dario Piana (director of The Deaths of Ian Stone) and written by Evan Charnov. It was released direct-to-DVD on the Warner Premiere label.

Both Corey Feldman and Jamison Newlander reprised their respective roles as the Frog Brothers. Shooting began in November 2009 in South Africa and the South African super model Tanit Phoenix was cast as Gwen Lieber, an author of romantic vampire novels.

== See also ==
- Vampire film
