= In the Cut =

In the Cut may refer to:

- In the Cut (novel), a 1995 novel by Susanna Moore
- In the Cut (film), a 2003 adaptation of Moore's novel, directed by Jane Campion
- In the Cut (TV series), a 2015–2020 American sitcom
- In the Cut, a 1974 album by Ray Bryant
- "In the Cut", a 2010 song by Wiz Khalifa from Kush & Orange Juice
