= Peter Arnett =

New Zealand and American journalist (1934–2025)

Peter Arnett ONZM
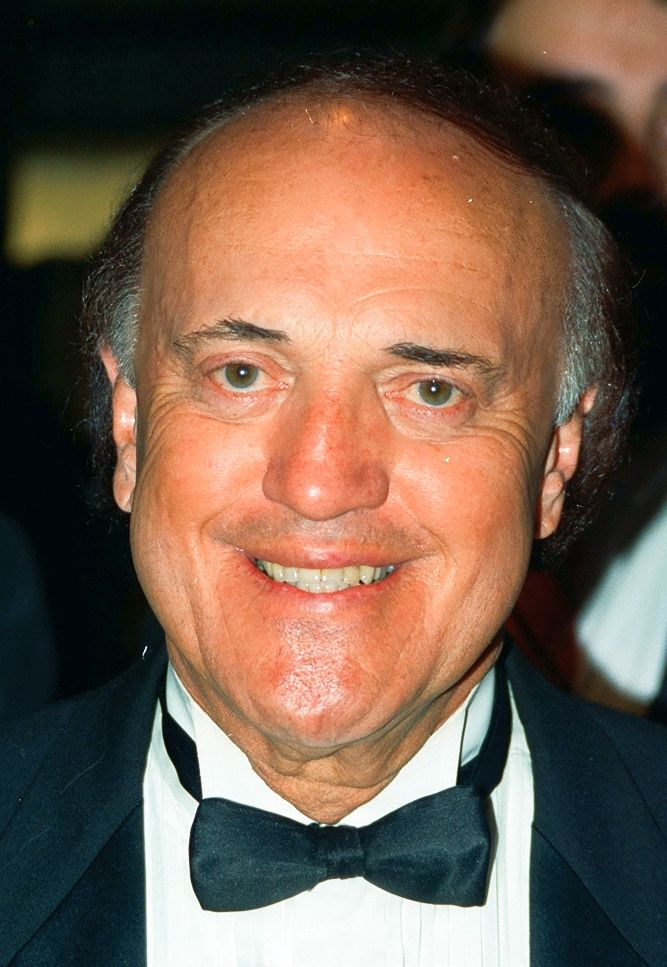
- Arnett in 1996
- Born: Peter Gregg Arnett; 13 November 1934; Riverton, New Zealand
- Died: 17 December 2025 (aged 91); Newport Beach, California, U.S.
- Occupation: Journalist
- Years active: 1960–2007
- Notable credit: Awarded the 1966 Pulitzer Prize in International Reporting for his work in Vietnam
- Spouse: Nina Nguyen
- Children: 2

Peter Gregg Arnett (13 November 1934 – 17 December 2025) was a New Zealand and American journalist. He was known for his coverage of the Vietnam War and the Gulf War. He was awarded the 1966 Pulitzer Prize in International Reporting for his work in Vietnam from 1962 to 1965, mostly reporting for the Associated Press.

Born to a Ngāi Tahu Māori and English family in the Southland Region, Arnett began his career in Invercargill before moving to Bangkok, prior to his experience in Vietnam. However, his reporting from Baghdad, Iraq during the 1991 Gulf War while working at CNN became one his most notable accomplishments as a journalist. He also worked for National Geographic magazine, later for various television networks—most notably for nearly two decades at CNN—and published a memoir, Live from the Battlefield: From Vietnam to Baghdad, 35 Years in the World's War Zones (1994). In March 1997, he interviewed Osama bin Laden, leader of al-Qaeda. The journalism school at the Southern Institute of Technology in New Zealand was named for Arnett. In the 2007 New Year Honours, Arnett was appointed an Officer of the New Zealand Order of Merit.

== Early life ==
Peter Gregg Arnett was born on 13 November 1934 in Riverton, in New Zealand's Southland region. He was Māori, of Ngāi Tahu Māori and English descent. His first job as a journalist was with The Southland Times.

== Journalism career ==
=== Vietnam ===
During his early years in journalism, Arnett worked in Southeast Asia, largely based in Bangkok. In 1960, he started publishing a small English-language newspaper in Laos. Eventually, he made his way to Vietnam.

Arnett became a reporter for the Associated Press, based in Saigon in the South, in the years when the United States began to get involved in the civil conflict and through the Vietnam War. On 7 July 1963, in what became known as the Double Seven Day scuffle, he was injured in a widely reported physical altercation between a group of western journalists and South Vietnamese undercover police. The reporters were trying to cover Buddhist protests against the South Vietnamese government. His articles, such as "Death of Supply Column 21", about an event during Operation Starlite in August 1965, angered the U.S. government, which had been increasing the number of forces in the region.

Arnett accompanied troops on dozens of missions, including the battle of Hill 875, in November 1967. An American detachment was sent to rescue another unit that was stranded in hostile territory, and the rescuers were nearly killed during the operation. In September 1972, Arnett joined a group of U.S. peace activists, including William Sloane Coffin and David Dellinger, on a trip to Hanoi, North Vietnam, to accept three American prisoners of war for return to the United States.

Arnett wrote in an unvarnished manner when reporting stories of ordinary soldiers and civilians. His writing was often criticised by administration spokesmen as negative, who wanted to keep reporting of the war positive. General William Westmoreland, President Lyndon B. Johnson and others in power put pressure on the AP to get rid of or transfer Arnett from the region.

=== "It became necessary to destroy the town to save it" ===
In what is considered one of his iconic dispatches, published on 7 February 1968, Arnett wrote about the Battle of Bến Tre: "'It became necessary to destroy the town to save it,' a United States major said today. He was talking about the decision by allied commanders to bomb and shell the town regardless of civilian casualties, to rout the Vietcong." The quotation was gradually altered in subsequent publications, eventually becoming the more familiar, "We had to destroy the village in order to save it." The accuracy of the original quotation and its source have often been called into question. Arnett never revealed his source, except to say that it was one of four officers he interviewed that day. U.S. Army Major Phil Cannella, the senior officer present at Bến Tre, suggested the quotation might have been a distortion of something he said to Arnett. The New Republic at the time attributed the quotation to US Air Force Major Chester L. Brown. In Walter Cronkite's 1971 book, Eye on the World, Arnett reasserted the quotation was something "one American major said to me in a moment of revelation".

=== Post-Vietnam ===
Arnett was one of the last western reporters remaining in Saigon after its fall and capture by the People's Army of Vietnam. Occupying soldiers showed him how they had entered the city. Arnett wrote the 26-part miniseries documentary, Vietnam: The Ten Thousand Day War (1980), produced by Canadian Broadcasting Corporation (CBC).

=== Soviet invasion of Afghanistan ===
At the time of the 1979 Soviet Invasion of Afghanistan, Arnett was working for Parade magazine. With a contact named Healy, he entered Afghanistan illegally from Pakistan; both men were dressed in traditional clothing as natives and led by Mujahideen guides. They continued to a Jalalabad hideaway of approximately fifty rebels. The trip came to an end when Healy fell into the Kunar River, ruining the pair's cameras. Later, Arnett would recount the story to journalist Artyom Borovik, who was covering the Soviet side of the war.

=== Gulf War ===
Beginning in 1981, Arnett worked for CNN for 18 years, ending in 1999. During the Gulf War, he became a household name worldwide as the only reporter to have live coverage directly from Baghdad, especially during the first 16 hours. His dramatic reports often were accompanied by the sound of air raid sirens blaring and U.S. bombs exploding in the background. Together with two other CNN journalists, Bernard Shaw and John Holliman, Arnett brought continuous coverage from Baghdad for the 16 initial intense hours of the war (17 January 1991). Although 40 foreign journalists were present at the Al-Rashid Hotel in Baghdad at the time, only CNN possessed the means—a private phone line connected to neighbouring Amman, Jordan—to communicate to the outside world. Arnett, Shaw, and Holliman would each be known as the "Boys of Baghdad". CNN broadcast Arnett's extended call live for several hours, with a picture of Arnett as video. Soon the other journalists left Iraq, including the two CNN colleagues, which left Arnett as the sole remaining reporter. The coverage was the first war coverage to be broadcast live on TV.

Two weeks into the war, Arnett was able to obtain an exclusive, uncensored interview with Saddam Hussein.

His accounts of civilian damage caused by the bombing were not well received by the coalition war administration. Its spokesmen had emphasised terms such as "smart bombs" and "surgical precision" in their public statements, in an effort to project keeping civilian casualties would be at a minimum. White House sources would later attack Arnett, saying that he was being used as a tool for Iraqi disinformation. About halfway through the war, representatives of the CIA approached Arnett. They believed that the Iraqi military was operating a high-level communication network from the basement of the Al Rashid Hotel, which is where Arnett and other staff from CNN were staying. The CIA wanted him to leave so the U.S. Air Force could bomb the hotel, but Arnett refused. He said he had been given a tour of the hotel and denied there was such a facility.

=== Interview with Osama bin Laden ===
In March 1997, Arnett of CNN interviewed Osama bin Laden, leader of al-Qaeda, after bin Laden declared jihad on the United States. Asked by Arnett, "What are your future plans?", bin Laden said, "You'll see them and hear about them in the media, God willing."

=== Operation Tailwind ===
In 1998, Arnett narrated a report on the joint venture (between CNN and Time magazine) programme called NewsStand, dealing with "Operation Tailwind," an operation that had been conducted by a unit of MACV-SOG, led by an elite Green Berets A-Team, in Laos in September 1970. The report, titled "The Valley of Death", claimed that one of the goals of the operation had been to kill a group of U.S. soldiers who had deserted, and that sarin, a nerve agent, had been used in the operation. The report was expressly approved by both CNN chairman Tom Johnson and CNN president Rick Kaplan. In response, the Pentagon commissioned another report contradicting that of CNN. CNN subsequently conducted its own investigation which concluded that the "journalism [in "The Valley of Death"] was flawed" and retracted the story. While all 12 men of the Green Beret A-Team were wounded in action during Operation Tailwind, no sarin was involved.

Due to a number of rebuttals claiming the CNN report was flawed, three or more of the individuals responsible were fired or forced to resign. Arnett was reprimanded, and left the network in April 1999, apparently due to "lingering fallout" from Tailwind.

=== Invasion of Iraq ===
On assignment for NBC and National Geographic, Arnett went to Iraq in 2003 to cover the U.S. invasion. After a press meeting there, he was granted an interview to state-run Iraqi TV on 31 March 2003. In it he said:

[N]ow America is re-appraising the battlefield, delaying the war against Iraq, maybe a week, and re-writing [sic] the war plan. The first plan has failed because of Iraqi resistance[;] now they are trying to write another war plan.

Earlier in the interview he said:

[O]ur reports about civilian casualties here, about the resistance of the Iraqi forces, are going back to the United States. It helps those who oppose the war when you challenge the policy to develop their arguments.

Initially, NBC defended him and said he had given the interview as a professional courtesy. A day later, though, NBC, MSNBC, and National Geographic all severed their relationships with Arnett. In response to Arnett's statement on Iraqi TV, NBC stated:

It was wrong for Mr. Arnett to grant an interview with state-controlled Iraqi TV, especially at a time of war and it was wrong for him to discuss his personal observations and opinions.

Arnett responded:

I want to apologize to NBC, MSNBC, National Geographic EXPLORER and the American people for clearly making a misjudgment by giving the interview to Iraqi Television. Clearly by giving that interview I created a firestorm in the United States, and for that I'm truly sorry.

Later that day, Arnett was hired by the British tabloid, The Daily Mirror, which had opposed the war. A couple of days later he also received work from Greek television channel NET television, and Belgian VTM.

== Academic career ==
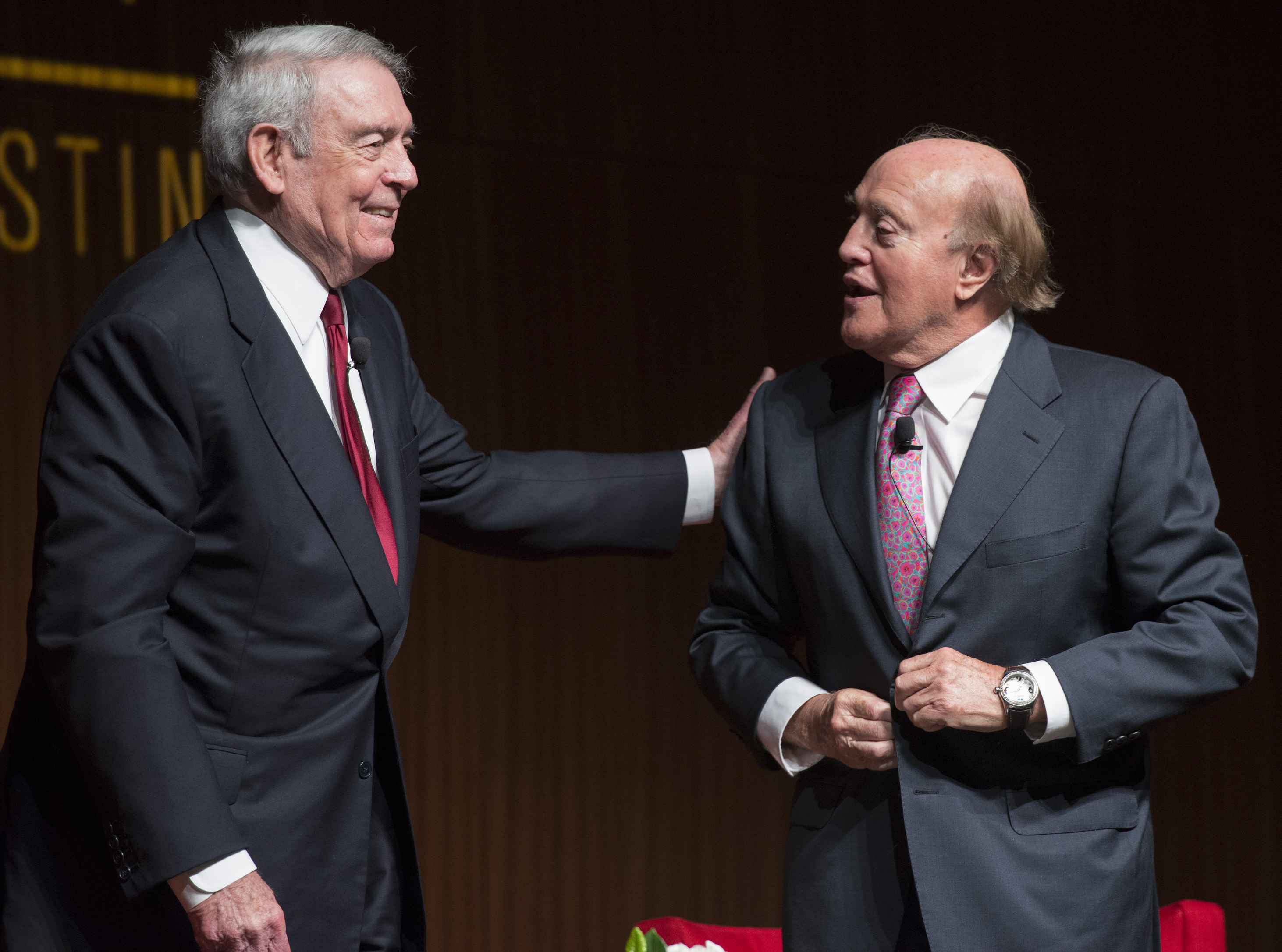
Dan Rather and Arnett discuss the role of the media in shaping perceptions of the Vietnam War at a panel discussion presented by the LBJ Presidential Library (April 2016)

After retiring as a field reporter in 2007, Arnett lived in Fountain Valley, California.

He also taught journalism at Shantou University in China. In New Zealand, the Peter Arnett School of Journalism was named for him at the Southern Institute of Technology; the journalism school closed in 2015.

== Personal life and death ==
In 1964, Arnett married Nina Nguyen, a Vietnamese woman. They had two children, Elsa and Andrew. Nina and Peter separated in 1983, divorced more than 20 years later, then reconciled in 2006.

Elsa Arnett attended Stuyvesant High School in New York and Harvard University. After graduating, she went into journalism, became a reporter, worked for several months on The Washington Post as an intern and then joined The Boston Globe. She worked with her father on his 1994 memoir about his reporting life. Elsa Arnett is married to former White House lawyer John Yoo.

In the 2007 New Year Honours, Arnett was appointed an Officer of the New Zealand Order of Merit for services to journalism.

Arnett died from prostate cancer in Newport Beach, California, on 17 December 2025, at the age of 91.

== In popular culture ==
Arnett appeared in Robert Wiener's book Live from Baghdad, and its 2002 HBO film adaptation, in which he was portrayed by actor Bruce McGill. The book, as well as the film, features Arnett's work as part of Wiener's crew in Baghdad. Arnett joined the team as tensions between Iraq and the West were escalating toward an imminent military encounter. CNN sent Arnett to Baghdad because of his experience in covering military conflicts. Arnett was part of the live coverage beginning on 16 January 1991, the start of the Gulf War air campaign, where he and colleagues Bernard Shaw and John Holliman kept broadcasting from their Al-Rasheed Hotel room amid extensive aerial bombing by the Western Coalition forces.

Arnett's interview with Osama bin Laden in 1997 became the subject of A War Story, a movie produced for television. John Leigh played the role of Arnett. The 2020 documentary Dateline: Saigon covered Arnett and his group of reporters' coverage of the Vietnam war.

== Selected works ==
External videos
- Booknotes interview with Arnett on Live from the Battlefield, 20 February 1994, C-SPAN

- Live from the Battlefield: From Vietnam to Baghdad: 35 Years in the World's War Zones. New York: Simon & Schuster, 1994. ISBN 978-0-671-75586-7
- Saigon Has Fallen: A Wartime Recollection by the Pulitzer Prize-Winning Journalist. New York: Rosetta Books/Associated Press, 2015 ISBN 978-0-7953-4643-9

== See also ==
- CNN controversies
- List of New Zealand television personalities
