= Dead Kids =

Dead Kids may refer to:

- Dead Kids (film), 2019 film
- "Dead Kids" (South Park), 2018 TV episode
- Strange Behavior, also known as Dead Kids, a 1981 slasher film

== See also ==
- Dead Boys (disambiguation)
- Dead Girl (disambiguation)
