= Dan Shor =

American actor, director and writer

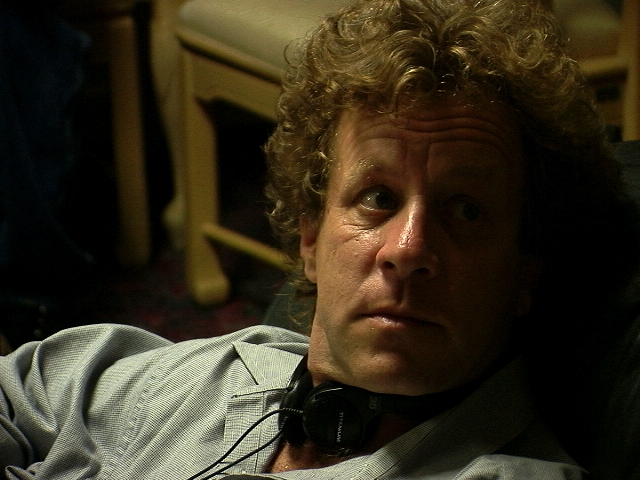
- Shor in 2004
- Born: November 16, 1956 (age 69); New York City, New York, U.S.
- Occupations: Actor; director; writer
- Years active: 1978–present
- Website: shodavision.com

Daniel Shor (born November 16, 1956) is an American actor, director, writer, and acting teacher with a career spanning over 40 years. His most recognized roles include Enoch Emery in John Huston's Wise Blood (1979), Pete Brady in Strange Behavior (1981), Ram in Tron (1982), and Billy the Kid in Bill & Ted's Excellent Adventure (1989).

== Early life ==
Shor was born and raised in New York City. He attended McBurney School from the 6th through the 8th grade. His mother, an actress, died when he was 14. He graduated from Elisabeth Irwin High School (June 1974) and began at Northwestern University that fall. He returned to New York, where he landed the lead role of Alan Strang in the first national company of Equus.

== Acting ==
Shor's studies continued at the Davis Center for Performing Arts at the City College of New York and at the London Academy of Music and Dramatic Art in England.

While in London, he appeared with Nigel Planer in Ann Jellicoe's punk rock musical play The Sport of My Mad Mad Mother at The Roundabout Theater. After leaving London for Los Angeles (due to his casting in the title role in the mini-series Studs Lonigan), he produced and reprised his role in his own version of Jellicoe's play, changing the setting from London to New York. Three months later, the set from the production was used in Billy Idol's music video for the song "Dancing with Myself".

Shor's acting credits include Air Force One, Bill and Ted's Excellent Adventure, Tron, Red Rock West, and John Huston's Wise Blood. Television films and mini-series include Friendly Fire, Elvis and the Colonel: The Untold Story, and The Blue and the Gray (for which Shor won a People's Choice Award). He was a series regular on Cagney and Lacey and several other television series, and he had numerous guest star appearances, including a Ferengi doctor on Star Trek: The Next Generation, a role he reprised seven years later on Star Trek: Voyager. In 1983, he starred in the band Kansas' music video "Fight Fire with Fire" and made appearances in their "Everybody's My Friend" video. Shor's stage performances in Los Angeles and San Diego have brought him eight Drama-Logue and LA Weekly performance awards.

Shor recently returned to the continental U.S. after living and working in the Northern Mariana Islands since 2003. In addition to running his production company ShodaVision, he remains active in New York theater, including the experimental conversational play "Outpost".

He has continued with stage work at the Guthrie Theater in Minneapolis and at the Pittsburgh Public Theater.

== Writing, directing ==
In 1995, Shor directed for the LA Diversified Theater Company, a multi-cultural theater alliance. He directed the Ovation Award winning production of He Who Gets Slapped starring Bud Cort at the Hudson Theater, as well as productions at the LA Theater Center, Company of Angels, Court, Zephyr, Two Roads, and LA Jewish theaters. His productions have received more than 30 Dramalogue, Ovation, and LA Weekly awards.

Shor's credits include two screenplays co-written with Czech film director Jiri Weiss, and he has worked in over 30 short videos for the Saipan and Guam Visitors Channels. His recent work includes Bigfoot Entertainment and Fashion TV's reality show Screen Test. He has also taught acting at the International Academy of Film and Television in Cebu, Philippines.

== Filmography ==
=== Film ===
==== Acting ====
Year	Title	Role	Notes
1979	Wise Blood	Enoch Emory	
1981	Back Roads	Spivey	
1981	Strange Behavior	Pete Brady	
1982	Tron	Roy Kleinberg / "Ram"	
1982	Talk to Me	Julian Howard	
1983	Strangers Kiss	Farris, the Producer	
1983	Strange Invaders	Teen Boy (Prologue)	
1984	Mike's Murder	Richard	
1986	Mesmerized	George	
1986	Black Moon Rising	Billy Lyons	
1988	Daddy's Boys	Hawk	
1989	Bill & Ted's Excellent Adventure	Billy the Kid	
1990	Solar Crisis	Harvard	
1990	Ghoulies III: Ghoulies Go to College	Professor	
1993	Doppelganger	Stanley White	
1993	Red Rock West	Deputy Bowman	
1997	Air Force One	Notre Dame Aide	
1999	Night Train	Jones	
2004	Wild Roomies	The Bartender	
2009	Passing Strangers	Photographer	short
2011	Tron: The Next Day	Roy Kleinberg/"Ram"	Short
2017	Crown Heights	District Attorney Snyder	
2021	Come Find Me	Arthur	

==== Directing ====
Year	Title	Notes
2011	My Angel My Hero	short

=== Television ===
Year	Title	Role	Notes
1978	Once Upon a Classic	Clarence / Sir Paragraph	episode: "A Connecticut Yankee in King Arthur's Court"
1979	Studs Lonigan	Young Studs	miniseries
1979	Friendly Fire	Prince	TV movie
1980	If Things Were Different	Eric	TV movie
1980	The Boy Who Drank Too Much	Art Collins	TV movie
1980	A Rumor of War	Manhole	miniseries; two episodes
1981	Knots Landing	Bobby	episode: "Step One"
1982	The Blue and the Gray	Luke Geyser	miniseries; three episodes
1983	This Girl for Hire	Punk	TV movie
1984	My Mother's Secret Life	Jack Camaras	TV movie
1985–86	Cagney & Lacey	Det. Jonah Newman	20 episodes
1988	Murder, She Wrote	Pierce	episode: "Murder Through the Looking Glass"
1988	Beverly Hills Buntz	Terry Dickstein	episode: "Terry and the Pirates"
1989	Beauty and the Beast	Bernie Spirko	episode: "What Rough Beast"
1989	Thirtysomething	Kit	episode: "Legacy"
1989	Star Trek: The Next Generation	Dr. Arridor	episode: "The Price"
1992	Dark Justice	Kellogg (Stafford's Attorney) (uncredited)	episode: "Instant Replay"
1993	Elvis and the Colonel: The Untold Story	Jass	TV Movie
1993	Against the Grain	Sheriff	episode: "A House Is Not a Home"
1996	Star Trek: Voyager	Arridor	episode: "False Profits"
2000	Judging Amy	D.A. Daniel Boyd	episode: "The Burden of Perspective"
2002	The X Files	2nd ER Nurse	episode: "William"
2007	Looking for America: A Saipan Story	Sergei	TV movie, also director
2015	Blue Bloods	Len Hardin	episode: "Rush to Judgment"
2017	Bull	Dr. Shepard	episode: "Teasher's Pet"
2019	Jessica Jones	Mathias Cole	episode: "A.K.A. Customer Service Is Standing By"
2022	The Blacklist	FJ Powell	episode: "Arcane Wireless"
