= John Holliman =

American journalist (1948–1998)

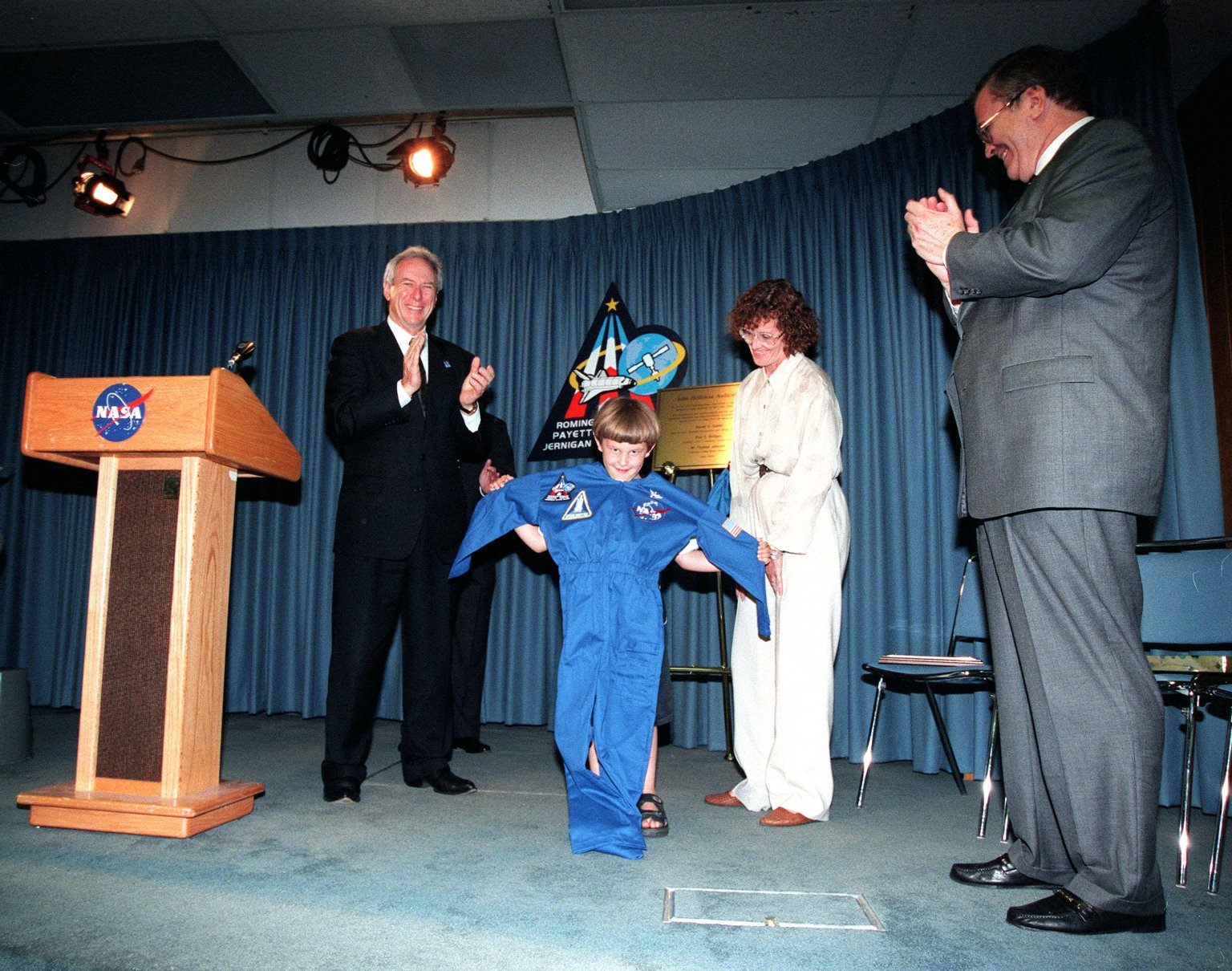
John Holliman's widow, Dianne, and son, Jay, participating in the dedication of the press site auditorium at the Kennedy Space Center in 1999. CNN executive Tom Johnson is on the right.

John Holliman (October 23, 1948 – September 12, 1998) was an American broadcast journalist. He was a member of the original reporting corps for CNN, serving as its agriculture correspondent after serving in the same capacity for Associated Press Radio in Washington, DC. He rose to prominence as one of the "Boys of Baghdad" during the first Persian Gulf War in 1991, as he was, along Peter Arnett and Bernard Shaw, one of only three journalists reporting from Baghdad when allied bombing of the city began. He was later known for his coverage of science, technology, and space exploration.

Holliman began his broadcasting career as a news and sports reporter for a local radio station in his hometown of Thomaston, Georgia. After two years at junior college, he transferred to the University of Georgia in Athens, Georgia. There he worked in the School of Journalism's student broadcasting operations, graduated, and began working as the news director for radio station WGAU, and later as senior newsman at radio station WRFC. He then moved to Atlanta and worked at the AM radio station WSB where he became a local celebrity by broadcasting live for several days from the site of a fire at an oil tank farm in Doraville, Georgia.

Holliman landed a job in Washington, DC, working as agricultural editor for the Associated Press. When CNN was created in 1980, he returned to Atlanta to host a weekday morning segment on farming and agricultural news. He was also the first member of the CNN Washington bureau. His international exposure increased after he covered the student uprising in Tiananmen Square, China. His "Holy Cow!" exclamation as a bomb exploded in Baghdad during the first night of the Persian Gulf War in 1991 became a national newspaper headline.

Holliman was a frequent speaker and strong supporter of student journalists at the University of Georgia's School (later College) of Journalism.

On September 12, 1998, he was killed in a head-on collision in his car near his home in suburban Atlanta. In May 1999, NASA dedicated the Launch Complex 39 Press Site auditorium at the Kennedy Space Center in Holliman's name.

== In popular culture ==
John Holliman appeared in Robert Wiener's book Live from Baghdad. He appeared as a character in the 2002 HBO film of the same name where he was portrayed by actor John Carroll Lynch.

The book as well as the film features Holliman's sudden involvement, under Wiener's supervision, in CNN's coverage of the Gulf War. Holliman was part of the live coverage of the January 17, 1991 Baghdad air strike where he, along with colleagues Bernard Shaw and Peter Arnett, kept broadcasting from their Al-Rasheed Hotel room amid extensive aerial bombing by the Western Coalition forces.

John Holliman played himself in the science fiction film Contact (1997), based on the Carl Sagan novel of the same name.

6711 Holliman (1989 HG) is a main-belt asteroid named for him.
