= Jim Fyfe =

American actor and television presenter

- Born: James Michael Fyfe
- Occupations: Teacher, Public Speaking Coach, Actor, writer, director, TV host/producers, acting coach, school admissions director, assistant headmaster, operations administrator
- Years active: 1986–present
- Title: Assistant Headmaster, Upper Division Head
- Spouses: Leslie Klein (deceased) Sarah Weeks (present)
- Children: 1
- Website: jimfyfe.com

James "Jim" Fyfe is an American teacher, public speaking coach, and a former actor, writer theatre director, and acting coach from Haddon Township NJ. Beginning in 2003, he worked at Rockland Country Day School in Congers, New York. He started as a history teacher before becoming the school's Admissions Director, later its Assistant Headmaster, Upper Division Head, and then the school's Operations Administrator while continuing to teach History. In 2015, he began working alongside comedic television host Stephen Colbert, as a producer on the CBS program The Late Show with Stephen Colbert. Since 2017 he has taught at EF International Academy and Homestead CCHS in Hurleyville, NY. As an actor, Fyfe was known for appearing on Broadway, TV and film, most notably on Dark Shadows (91), The Fresh Prince of Bel-Air, The X-Files, Law and Order, and in Peter Jackson's film, The Frighteners. Former children may know him from HBO's Encyclopedia, and as the co-host from 1988-89 on The Dr. Fad Show, starring Ken Hakuta.

== Filmography ==
Year	Title	Role	Notes
1988	Tanner '88	Emile Berkoff	10 episodes
1988	Encyclopedia	Various	Unknown episodes
1988-89	The Dr. Fad Show	Himself	Co-Host
1991	Dark Shadows	Willie Loomis/Ben Loomis	12 episodes
1991	A Kiss Before Dying	Terry Dieter	
1993	Tracey Ullman Takes on New York	Drug Dealer	TV special
1993	The Program	Nichols	
1995	Something Wilder	Scott Zachary	Episode: "No Kids Allowed"
1996	Power 98	Roger Zalman	
1996	The Frighteners	Stuart	
1997	Tracey Takes On...	Businessman #1	Episode: "Food"
1997	The Real Blonde	Roy	
1998	Tracey Takes On...	A.D.	Episode: "Hollywood"
1998	Team Knight Rider	Dennis	Episode: "Et Tu Dante?"
1998	Smart Guy	Mark Breslin	Episode: "Strangers on the Net"
1998	Walking to the Waterline	Anthony, the B&B Clerk	
1999	Kill the Man	Guy	
1999-2002	The X-Files	Jimmy the Geek/Kimmy the Geek / Kimmy Belmont	2 episodes: "Three of a Kind" and "Jump the Shark"
2002	Law & Order: Criminal Intent	Bill	Episode: "Tuxedo Hill"
2004	Phantom Force	Ivan Cutler	TV movie
2004	Tanner on Tanner	Emile Berkoff	2 episodes
2004	Red Dead Revolver	Earl Weatherby, Fitch, Verne Wiggins	Videogame
2006	Full Grown Men	Night Manager	

== Buy Me That! A Kids' Survival Guide to TV Advertising and Buy Me That Too ==
In the late 80s, Fyfe starred as himself in the Buy Me That! series. The specials teach children about the ways commercials can be manipulative, for example making products appear better in commercials than they are in real life, or by using product placement.
