= Live from Baghdad (film) =

2002 television film

- DVD cover
- Genre: War drama
- Based on: Live from Baghdad by Robert Wiener
- Screenplay by: Robert Wiener; Richard Chapman; John Patrick Shanley; Timothy J. Sexton
- Directed by: Mick Jackson
- Starring: Michael Keaton; Helena Bonham Carter; Lili Taylor; Bruce McGill; Michael Murphy; Paul Guilfoyle; Kurt Fuller
- Music by: Steve Jablonsky
- Country of origin: United States
- Original language: English

Production
- Executive producers: Rosalie Swedlin; Sara Colleton
- Producer: George W. Perkins
- Cinematography: Ivan Strasburg
- Editor: Joe Hutshing
- Running time: 108 minutes
- Production company: Industry Entertainment

Original release
- Network: HBO
- Release: December 7, 2002

Live from Baghdad is a 2002 American war drama television film directed by Mick Jackson. The screenplay by Robert Wiener, Richard Chapman, John Patrick Shanley and Timothy J. Sexton is based on Wiener's 1992 book. The film premiered on HBO on December 7, 2002, during the prelude stage of the Iraq War.

Michael Keaton stars as Wiener, a CNN on-location producer in Baghdad, Iraq during the Gulf War in 1991. The film focuses on the news media's (primarily CNN's) coverage of the war. Fundamentally an action–drama, the characters grapple with the ethics and implications of 24-hour journalism in the days leading up to and during the United States-led bombing of Baghdad.

== Plot ==
On August 2, 1990, Iraqi forces and tanks roll into Kuwait City, as the Iraqi invasion of Kuwait begins. In Atlanta, CNN picks Robert Wiener and his crew to go to Baghdad and cover the invasion.

As they settle in their hotel rooms, they notice that they are being monitored. The crew realize they must carefully navigate how they report their stories or risk being kicked out of the country. Their first story, about a young British boy held as a hostage by Saddam Hussein, is well-received at home. Wiener goes to meet with the Iraqi Minister of Information Naji Al Hadithi, impressing him by waiting for several hours to get a chance to speak with him. He requests radio equipment that allows them to broadcast live from Baghdad and an interview with Hussein, with Wiener noting that he's aware Hussein watches CNN.

Wiener and his crew go to an Embassy where several Americans, unable to leave, are taking shelter to avoid being arrested or killed by the Iraqi government. Wiener's crew interviews businessman Bob Vinton, who speaks kindly of Iraq and its people on camera. Despite this, Vinton soon goes missing and Wiener becomes consumed with guilt. He speaks with Al Hadithi, who discreetly confirms that Vinton has not been harmed, earning Wiener's respect and trust.

Al Hadithi declines Wiener's equipment request and his request to interview Hussein, but instead offers to let him report in Kuwait, where no other news crew has been allowed to go. Eager to confirm whether numerous reports of human rights abuses in Kuwait are true, Wiener agrees despite caveats from the Iraqi government about where they can go and what they can report. They go to a hospital to report on rumored abuses of Kuwaiti infants, but their escort becomes agitated by their line of questioning and calls off the story. Producer Ingrid Formanek angrily argues with the escort on the way back to the airport, and they discover that their presence in Kuwait has become a news story. When they return to Baghdad, the CNN crew is mocked by other news crews for allowing the Iraqi government to shape their coverage.

Wiener confronts Al Hadithi, and he agrees to give CNN an interview with Hussein. Bernard Shaw arrives in Baghdad for the interview, and the CNN crew meet Hussein. In the interview, Hussein states that Iraq withdrawing from Kuwait would be like the U.S. withdrawing from Hawaii. The crew then covers the release of American hostages from Iraq. At the airport, Wiener finds Bob Vinton and is relieved he's safe.

The United Nations gives Iraq until January 15, 1991 to withdraw from Kuwait, or face military action. As the deadline comes to an end the crew sees that the Iraqi Army is installing anti-aircraft guns in Baghdad. The crew then gets equipment that allows them to broadcast live.

Bernard Shaw returns to Baghdad to interview Hussein again, but as the deadline approaches it becomes clear the interview will not occur. Several reporters flee Iraq as the certainty of American airstrikes becomes clear. The CNN crew debates whether to stay or go, and Wiener leaves it up to each of them. Wiener elects to stay, but before any of them can go, the airstrikes begin. Shaw, alongside correspondents John Holliman and Peter Arnett report live on CNN from a hotel room, describing the sight of American airstrikes and the Iraqi anti-aircraft guns. Hussein and U.S. President George H. W. Bush are both seen watching the coverage.

At dawn, the crew are commended by their colleagues in Atlanta for their work, and they receive praise from U.S. officials and other news networks for their coverage of the war. Al Hadithi arrives with Iraqi soldiers and stops CNN from broadcasting further. Before leaving to return home, Wiener says goodbye to Al Hadithi, who affirms their friendship and tells him he hopes to see him again when the war is over.

== Cast ==
- Michael Keaton as Robert Wiener, a CNN producer who braves Iraq and refuses to flee when all the other news broadcasters have already fled. He is resourceful in his dealings with Iraqi bureaucracy. For his performance he was nominated for a Golden Globe award.
- Helena Bonham Carter as Ingrid Formanek, Robert's colleague who agrees to leave Baghdad with the other reporters. She earned an Emmy and Golden Globe nomination for her part in the film.
- David Suchet as Naji Al-Hadithi, the Minister of Information who befriends Robert Wiener and provides Robert with insight into the Iraqi side of the war.
- Michael Murphy as Tom Johnson, the president of CNN during the Persian Gulf War, from 1990-1991.
- Paul Guilfoyle as Ed Turner, an executive vice president of CNN.
- Michael Cudlitz as Tom Murphy, CNN reporter who comes as part of Wiener's crew initially and makes a few reports, but eventually leaves Iraq.
- Joshua Leonard as Mark Biello, the crew's cameraman.
- Lili Taylor as Judy Parker, the crew's sound technician who accompanies Robert and the crew.
- Hamish Linklater as Richard Roth, CNN reporter called in from Amman to replace Murphy. Roth eventually leaves Iraq as well, to be replaced by Holliman, but stays on the course as he is seen reporting with a gas mask from Tel Aviv shortly after the Gulf War begins.
- John Carroll Lynch as John Holliman, veteran CNN reporter assigned to the Oil Desk. He later joins Wiener's crew in Baghdad to report the action from the spot, one of the three reporters to cover bombing of Baghdad live.
- Bruce McGill as Peter Arnett, veteran New Zealand-American CNN reporter with wartime experience, joins Wiener's crew after political tensions heighten, one of the three reporters to cover bombing of Baghdad live.
- Robert Wisdom as Bernard Shaw, veteran CNN anchorman who travels to Baghdad twice to join Wiener, first to interview Saddam and second when it was believed that Saddam would give another interview where he might call off the stand-off with the West. However that interview never takes place and the Gulf War begins on January 17, with Shaw is one of three reporters covering bombing of Baghdad live.

== Production ==
Filming took place in Morocco and Los Angeles.

== Critical reception ==
The film received positive reviews from film critics. Review aggregator Rotten Tomatoes reports that 88% out of eight professional critics give the film a positive review, with a rating average of 7/10.

== See also ==
- CNN
- Four-wire circuit
- Four-wire terminating set
