= Ilana Levine =

American actress

- Levine in 2026
- Born: New Jersey, United States
- Occupation: Actress
- Spouse: Dominic Fumusa (m. 2002)
- Children: 2

Ilana Levine is an American actress. She made her first on-screen appearance as Andrea Spinelli in the HBO comedy-drama series Tanner '88 (1988), appearing in 11 episodes.

== Career ==
Raised in Teaneck, New Jersey, Levine attended Teaneck High School and Fordham University graduating in 1986. She developed an interest in acting after seeing a script resting on a counter while she was getting her hair done in 1986 at a local Teaneck hair salon. The stylist referred her to a New York City-based acting program and suggested that she audit the course.

Levine portrayed Andrea Spinelli in 11 episodes of HBO's comedy-drama series Tanner '88. In 1988, she was featured in a television and radio voice over for energy drink Red Bull. She played the role of Lucy van Pelt in the 1999 revival of the Broadway play You're A Good Man, Charlie Brown. Levine has also appeared on Broadway in Jake's Women, The Last Night of Ballyhoo, and Wrong Mountain.

Since 2016 she is the host of the iTunes podcast Little Known Facts with Ilana Levine. In 2019, she along with drummer and percussionist Sam Maher started a podcast titled How To Be More Chill. In 2020, she started another podcast titled And The Award Goes To.

She has also appeared on numerous television shows, including Seinfeld, NYPD Blue, Lois & Clark, and Law & Order, and in films including Kissing Jessica Stein, Ira and Abby, Friends with Kids, Five Flights Up, Gigantic, Confessions Of A Shopaholic, The Nanny Diaries, Don Peyote, Storytelling, and Failure to Launch.

== Personal life ==
Levine is married to actor Dominic Fumusa and they have two children named Georgia and Caleb. Her husband converted to Judaism (her faith).

== Filmography ==
Film roles
Year	Title	Role	Notes
1993	Me and Veronica	Jealous Woman	
1995	Roommates	ER Nurse	
1995	Just Looking	Gwen	
1996	Mailman	Denise	Short film
1999	Just Looking	Norma De Lorenzo	
2000	Looking for an Echo	Sandi, Vic's Date	
2000	Drop Back Ten	Pamela Berry	
2001	The Adventures of Rug Raymond	Vironica Salesian	Short film
2001	The Job	Diane	
2001	Kissing Jessica Stein	Helen's New Girlfriend	
2001	Storytelling	Onlooker #2	Segment: "Non-Fiction"
2002	Standard Time	Marcy	
2004	Marmalade	Patty	
2006	Failure to Launch	Yoga Teacher	
2006	Ira & Abby	Aurora Finklestein	
2007	The Nanny Diaries	Whiny Mom	
2008	The Accidental Husband	Autograph Seeker	
2008	Gigantic	Ducky Saltinstall	
2008	Gone to the Dogs	Colleen	Short film
2009	Confessions of a Shopaholic	Svelte Manhattanite #2	
2010	Civil Unions: A Love Story	N/A	Short film
2011	Friends with Kids	Mom in Restaurant	
2012	Girl Most Likely	Teacher	
2012	Greetings from Tim Buckley	Paula	
2014	Don Peyote	Rabbi	
2014	5 Flights Up	Zoë's Mother	
2020	Making the Day	Hostess	

Television roles
Year	Title	Role	Notes
1988	Tanner '88	Andrea Spinelli	11 episodes
1990	Thirtysomething	Student #4	Episode: "I'm Nobody, Who Are You?"
1992	Seinfeld	Joyce	Episode: "The Contest"
1993	South of Sunset	Maryanne	Episode: "Dream Girl"
1994	NYPD Blue	Monique	Episode: "Jumpin' Jack Fleishman"
1995	Hope & Gloria	Nina	Episode: "Are We Having Fun Yet?"
1995	Lois & Clark: The New Adventures of Superman	Veronica Kipling	Episode: "When Irish Eyes Are Killing"
1995	Partners	Loretta	Episode: "Sexiversary"
1995	Hudson Street	Michelle	Episode: "Saturday Night's the Loneliest Night of the Week"
1997	Life... and Stuff	Nancy Linstrom	Episode: "The First One"
1998	Law & Order	Emily Schoener	Episode: "Bad Girl"
2001	100 Centre Street	Julie Killebrew	Episode: "Queenie's Running"
2002	Law & Order: Criminal Intent	Luke Miller's Attorney	Episode: "Malignant"
2004	Tanner on Tanner	Andrea Spinelli	4 episodes
2005	Law & Order	Victim's Advocate Employee	Episode: "Criminal Law"
2007	Rescue Me	Saleswoman	Episode: "Keefe"
2008	Cashmere Mafia	Susie	Episode: "The Deciders"
2008	Law & Order: Criminal Intent	Evelyn Carlson	Episode: "Frame"
2011	Law & Order: Criminal Intent	Brenda Little	Episode: "Icarus"
2012	Law & Order: Special Victims Unit	Shelly Raedo	Episode: "Strange Beauty"
2012	Damages	Nurse	Episode: "I'm Afraid of What I'll Find"
2019	Divorce	Cassidy	Episode: "Away Games"

=== Podcasts ===
Year	Title	Notes
2016–present	Little Known Facts with Ilana Levine	Host and producer
2019–present	How To Be More Chill	Co-Host
2020–present	And the Award Goes To	Host
