= Night Train (1999 film) =

- Directed by: Les Bernstien
- Written by: Les Bernstien; Gary Walkow
- Produced by: Les Bernstien; Anthony Huljev; Chris Beckman; Omar Veytia
- Starring: John Voldstad; Barry Cutler; Nikoletta Skarlatos; Pedro Aldana; Donna Pieroni; Dan Shor
- Cinematography: Patrick Melly
- Edited by: George Lockwood
- Music by: Marco Aldaco; Calavera; El Mosco
- Production company: Metropolis Pictures Inc. (II)
- Distributed by: Synapse Films
- Release date: 1999
- Running time: 80 minutes
- Country: United States
- Languages: English; Spanish

Night Train is a 1999 American drama film directed by Les Bernstien and starring John Voldstad, Barry Cutler, Nikoletta Skarlatos, Pedro Aldana, Donna Pieroni and Dan Shor. Night Train was filmed almost entirely in the border city of Tijuana, Mexico.
