= A War in Hollywood =

- Spanish: Hollywood contra Franco
- Directed by: Oriol Porta
- Written by: Isabel Andrés; Oriol Porta; Llorenç Soler
- Produced by: Lisa Berger; Cristina Mora; Elisa Plaza
- Cinematography: David Garcia
- Edited by: David Gutiérrez Camps
- Music by: Carles Pedragosa
- Production companies: Televisió de Catalunya; Àrea de Televisió
- Distributed by: Id Communications; Àrea de Televisió
- Release date: August 21, 2008 (Santander)
- Running time: 92 min
- Box office: US$11,000

A War in Hollywood (Spanish: Hollywood contra Franco) is a 2008 Spanish documentary biography historical film directed by Oriol Porta. It is about the Spanish Civil War which affected Hollywood artists such as Alvah Bessie.

== Cast ==
- Lluís Soler and Brendan Price as Alvah Bessie
- Moe Fishman as himself, Member of the Abraham Lincoln Brigade
- Susan Sarandon as herself
- Román Gubern as himself - Film Historian
- Dan Bessie as himself - Alvah Bessie's Son
- Walter Bernstein as himself
- Arthur Laurents as himself
- Patrick McGilligan as himself - Author of 'Tender Comrades'
- Eric Johnston as himself - Motion Pictures Association
- James Philips as voice over off line
- Lauren Bacall as Rose Cullen / Herself
- Ingrid Bergman as María
- Herbert J. Biberman as himself
- Humphrey Bogart as Rick Blaine / Himself
- Charles Boyer as Luis Denard
- Joseph I. Breen as himself
- Madeleine Carroll as Norma
- Claudette Colbert as Augusta Nash
- Lester Cole as himself
- Gary Cooper as Robert Jordan
- Bette Davis as Sara Muller
- Edward Dmytryk as himself
- Dwight D. Eisenhower as himself
- Henry Fonda as Marco
- Francisco Franco as himself
- John Garfield as John 'Kit' McKittrick / Himself
- Murray Hamilton as Brooks Carpenter
- Ernest Hemingway as himself
- Hirohito as himself
- Adolf Hitler as himself
- Danny Kaye as himself
- Ring Lardner Jr. as himself
- John Howard Lawson as himself
- Michael Lonsdale as Reporter
- Albert Maltz as himself
- Christian Marquand as Zaganar
- Ray Milland as Tom Martin
- Zero Mostel as Hecky Brown
- Michael Murphy as Alfred Miller
- Benito Mussolini as himself
- Patrick O'Neal as George Bissinger
- Samuel Ornitz as himself
- Gregory Peck as Harry Street / Manuel Artiguez
- Anthony Quinn as Viñolas
- Claude Rains as Captain Louis Renault
- Franklin D. Roosevelt as himself
- Adrian Scott as himself
- Joseph Stalin as himself
- Mark Stevens as Dr. David Foster
- Barbra Streisand as Katie
- Dalton Trumbo as himself
- Manuela Vargas as María
- James Woods as Frankie McVeigh
