= My Angel My Hero =

- Directed by: Faizan Sheikh; Dan Shor
- Written by: Faizan Sheikh; Dr. Dennis Goldberg; Jeff Wood
- Produced by: Faizan Sheikh; Muhammad Munir; Chris Alvarez; Raj Rahi; Shaheen Razi
- Starring: Faizan Sheikh; Dakim Wills; Kimberly Dipersia
- Cinematography: Vitaly Bokser
- Edited by: Jack Haigis
- Music by: Thomas DeRenzo
- Release date: 2011
- Running time: 24 minutes
- Country: United States
- Language: English

My Angel My Hero is a 2011 short film. It is directed by Faizan Sheikh and Hollywood veteran actor Dan Shor. The film stars Faizan Sheikh, Kimberly Dipersia and Dakim Wills. This stylish, dark drama with sacrifices of our time surprises us with its characters and the strength to survive. The film echoes the sound of music and dance to heal Parkinson's disease, a disease caused by the deterioration of brain cells leading to tremors of the muscles in the body.

== Plot ==
The film tells the story of a young boy Billy (Dakim Wills), who is suffering from Parkinson's disease and dances in New York City subway and streets. He eventually finds an inspiration by meeting a former Investment Banker, Da (Faizan Sheikh) and together they discover the advantages of dance towards Parkinson's disease.

== Cast ==
Character	Actor
Da	Faizan Sheikh
Billy	Dakim Wills
Mira	Kimberly Dipersia
Pamela	Pamela Quinn
Adult Billy	Chris Rolle
Mira's Father	Dan Shor

== Crew ==
- Director of Photography - Vitaly Bokser

== Production ==
The short film was shot for six days. The film was shot using the RED ONE camera at 4K.

== Soundtrack ==
The title song of the film "My Angel My Hero" is sung by Pia Toscano. She has also co-written the song with Cassie Parise. The other song "Gori Gori" is sung by "Gurmit Sandhu" and composed by Satpal Singh.
