= Town & Country (film) =

2001 film by Peter Chelsom

- Theatrical release poster
- Directed by: Peter Chelsom
- Written by: Buck Henry; Michael Laughlin
- Produced by: Simon Fields; Andrew Karsch; Fred Roos
- Starring: Warren Beatty; Diane Keaton; Andie MacDowell; Garry Shandling; Jenna Elfman; Nastassja Kinski; Goldie Hawn
- Cinematography: William A. Fraker
- Edited by: Claire Simpson
- Music by: Rolfe Kent
- Production companies: FR Production; Longfellow Pictures; Sidney Kimmel Entertainment; Simon Fields Productions
- Distributed by: New Line Cinema
- Release date: April 27, 2001
- Running time: 104 minutes
- Country: United States
- Language: English
- Budget: $90–105 million
- Box office: $10.4 million

Town & Country is a 2001 American romantic comedy film directed by Peter Chelsom, written by Buck Henry and Michael Laughlin, and starring Warren Beatty, Diane Keaton, Goldie Hawn, Garry Shandling, Andie MacDowell, Jenna Elfman, Nastassja Kinski, Charlton Heston, and Josh Hartnett. Beatty plays an architect, with Keaton as his wife, and Hawn and Shandling as their best friends. It was Beatty's and Keaton's first film together since 1981's Reds, and Beatty's third film with Hawn, after 1971's Dollars and 1975's Shampoo.

The film was poorly received by critics and is one of the biggest box office flops in American film history, grossing a little over $10 million worldwide from a $105 million budget. The film was Beatty's last appearance on screen for 15 years before he starred in Rules Don't Apply, released in November 2016.

== Plot ==
Porter Stoddard is a prosperous architect with New York homes on Park Avenue and in the Hamptons, as well as a vacation lodge in Sun Valley, Idaho. He has been married for 25 years to Ellie, an interior designer, but has been having an affair with Alex, a cellist.

There is trouble brewing in the marriage of their best friends. Mona Morris wants a divorce from antique-dealer husband Griffin, after catching him having a hotel tryst. The part she did not catch is that Griffin's new romantic partner is a cross-dressing man. Mona wants to travel to Mississippi to see her girlhood antebellum home. Ellie is worried about Mona's depression over the state of her marriage and does not feel she should be alone, so Porter is asked to accompany Mona down south. There, they end up having a quick sexual fling.

With things awkward at home for both, Porter and Griffin fly by themselves to Sun Valley to get away from their troubles. But it is not long before Porter finds himself in a romantic entanglement with Eugenie Claybourne, a spoiled heiress whose gun-loving father is already loading his shotgun in case Porter does wrong by his daughter. A free spirit named Auburn coaxes Porter and Griffin to a Halloween party, where they end up dressed in preposterous costumes.

By the time Porter returns to New York, everything is falling apart, not only his home life but his house. And, once and for all, Griffin finds the nerve to tell his wife that he is leaving her for someone else, but it is not another woman.

== Cast ==
- Warren Beatty as Porter Stoddard
- Diane Keaton as Ellie Stoddard
- Goldie Hawn as Mona Morris
- Garry Shandling as Griffin Morris
- Andie MacDowell as Eugenie Claybourne
- Jenna Elfman as Auburn
- Nastassja Kinski as Alex
- Charlton Heston as Mr. Claybourne
- Marian Seldes as Mrs. Claybourne
- Josh Hartnett as Tom Stoddard
- Katharine Towne as Holly
- Ian McNeice as Peter Principal
- Bill Hootkins as Barney
- Terri Hoyos as Yolanda
- Tricia Vessey as Alice
- Azura Skye as Spider
- Buck Henry as Suttler

== Production ==
The production costs of the film totaled an estimated US$90 million, not including distribution and marketing expenses. The total worldwide box office came to $10,372,291. Considering that typically half of the gross box office receipts go to the exhibitors and half to the filmmakers, Town & Country lost the studio at least $100 million, and probably much more if costs for distribution and marketing are considered, which average around $35–50 million for a studio picture such as this. The studio, having already spent in excess of $90 million, backed a limited distribution and marketing campaign in the $15–20 million range, bringing the total cost to $105–110 million. However, some insiders have said that the total production costs were more likely in the $100–105 million range, with the prints and ads at around $20 million, which would bring the total costs to about $125 million.

=== 1998–1999 ===
The production began on June 8, 1998, on a budget of $44 million, including $10 million up front for Beatty. Filming was originally supposed to wrap by the fall of 1998 for a summer or fall 1999 release. Various problems occurred during filming, however, including Beatty's meticulous demand for many takes. Also, the script was still being developed, as producers were not satisfied with the ending originally written by Michael Laughlin. Various other screenwriters were brought in, including Paul Attanasio and Gary Ross.

By April 1999, production was still going, but Shandling had to leave to film What Planet Are You From?, as did Keaton (Hanging Up, which she also directed). It took a full year before the cast could be gathered to film the new pages written by Buck Henry. Henry was hired for what was originally only going to be a few weeks of polish work. Eventually, he stayed on for several months and earned (by some accounts) $3 million for rewriting roughly half of the script. Henry has stated that he bought a new home with the money he made on this "quick rewrite assignment."

=== 2000 reshoots ===
Reshoots were scheduled to begin on April 10, 2000, and were expected to last just a couple of weeks. However, filming continued through June 2000, when it finally wrapped two years after principal photography originally began. The reshoots included all of the new scenes, with screenwriter Buck Henry joining the cast as a divorce mediator. A new climax at a fashion gala involving all of the main female characters was written and filmed. Also, the closure scenes with Shandling and Hawn at the antique store and the scene with Beatty and Kinski on the street near the end were added. The scene between Beatty and Kinski in Manhattan as she is hailing a cab was actually filmed in downtown Los Angeles and was one of the last scenes filmed.

== Release ==
After 12 release date changes, the film was released in theaters on April 27, 2001, nearly three years after filming began.

=== Critical reception ===
Town & Country received overwhelmingly negative reviews from critics. On Rotten Tomatoes, the film has an approval rating of 13%, based on 91 reviews, with an average rating of 3.2/10. The site's critical consensus reads, "Afflicted with extensive re-editing and re-writing, this sex comedy feels confusingly choppy. Also, the main characters are so wealthy and privileged that it's difficult to feel sympathy for their problems." On Metacritic, the film has a score of 34 out of 100, based on 27 critics, indicating "generally unfavorable reviews". Audiences polled by CinemaScore gave the film an average grade of "C−" on an A+ to F scale.

Film critic Nathan Rabin described it as "the rare movie that can't seem to decide whether it wants to be Freddy Got Fingered or Hannah and Her Sisters." Michael Wilmington of the Chicago Tribune gave the film two stars, writing that it "has an awkward, hasty feel. The editing often seems clumsy. The acting sometimes seems pushy. The sound has an airless dead quality, as if the scenes and characters were lost in a vacuum. The casual drop-dead glamour of Beatty's old roles and movies is missing--and the lightness, airiness and casually devastating sexiness of Shampoo are no longer here. Neither are Beatty's shining Beverly Hills Casanova looks--though, because he's playing a guy who gets into things with almost everyone in the movie, it certainly seems morally trapped in the '70s." Meanwhile, Chicago Sun-Times critic Lloyd Sachs gave the film 1-1/2 stars, writing that it begins as a "shambling, satirically jumpy comedy overtones of Woody Allen before taking a "sputtering nose dive." Sachs added that while the film has a "handsome veneer," "all the visual amenities in the world can't make up for all the dead comedic air."

=== Awards ===
- Golden Raspberry Awards
  - Worst Director – Peter Chelsom (with Warren Beatty) (nominated)
  - Worst Supporting Actor – Charlton Heston (also for Cats & Dogs and Planet of the Apes) (won)
  - Worst Supporting Actress – Goldie Hawn (nominated)
- Stinkers Bad Movie Awards
  - Worst Picture (nominated)
  - Worst Director – Peter Chelsom with unwanted assistance from Warren Beatty (nominated)
  - Most Painfully Unfunny Comedy (nominated)

=== Legacy ===
Author James Robert Parish covered the film in his 2006 book, Fiasco — A History of Hollywood's Iconic Flops.

The Hollywood Reporter lists Town & Country as the fifth-largest box office bomb of the 2000s. In 2014, the Los Angeles Times listed the film as one of the most expensive box office flops of all time.
