= Michael Laughlin =

American filmmaker (1938–2021)

- Born: Michael Stoddard Laughlin; November 28, 1938; U.S.
- Died: October 20, 2021 (aged 82); Honolulu, Hawaii, U.S.
- Occupation(s): Film director, screenwriter, film producer
- Notable work: Two-Lane Blacktop
- Spouse: Leslie Caron (m. 1969; div. 1980)
- Partner(s): Susanna Moore (1980s–1990s)

Michael Stoddard Laughlin (November 28, 1938 – October 20, 2021) was an American film director, producer and screenwriter.

== Biography ==
Laughlin was raised in Minonk, Illinois, where his father Donald M. Laughlin had extensive farms. He played basketball and studied law at college. During his first few days in California, he met the Dean Martin family and other movie stars, which had a lasting effect on him. His mother Hazel Stoddard Laughlin died in 1965. During the late 1960s, he lived in London, where he produced The Whisperers starring Dame Edith Evans, directed by Bryan Forbes. It was in London that he met and married Leslie Caron who had two children from her previous marriage to Sir Peter Hall. They moved to Los Angeles where they settled in Cuesta Way, Bel Air, and over the next few years, Laughlin produced a series of groundbreaking films including the cult hit Two-Lane Blacktop starring James Taylor and Laurie Bird. He also worked with writers and directors Floyd Mutrux and Monte Hellman.

He and Caron separated in 1975, after living in Paris for a year. Laughlin then lived with the writer Susanna Moore. They lived in London and New York during the 1980s and 1990s, and Laughlin began writing and directing genre films styled in homage to 1950s B-movies. Mesmerized, which Laughlin wrote and directed, was produced by Jodie Foster. After separating from Moore, Michael Laughlin wrote screenplays for Hollywood studios, including Town & Country.

Laughlin died from complications related to COVID-19 in Honolulu on October 20, 2021, at the age of 82.

== Awards and accolades ==
In 2012, Two-Lane Blacktop was chosen as one of only 20 films to be housed in the National Film Registry at the Library of Congress. Hailed as a minimalist classic, it was chosen as an example of the short-lived period of youth-oriented films following Bonnie and Clyde, The Graduate and Easy Rider in the late 1960s. Producers such as Laughlin financed a spate of low-budget, innovative films by young "New Hollywood" filmmakers, with influences ranging from playwright Samuel Beckett to European filmmakers Robert Bresson, Jacques Rivette and Michelangelo Antonioni.

In 1984, Strange Invaders was nominated for Saturn Award for Best Screenplay and for Best Film at the Avoriaz Fantasy Film Festival.

== Filmography ==
- The Whisperers (1967; producer)
- Joanna (1968; producer)
- Two-Lane Blacktop (1971; producer)
- Dusty and Sweets McGee (1971; producer)
- The Christian Licorice Store (1971; producer)
- Strange Behavior (1981; writer/director)
- Strange Invaders (1983; writer/director)
- Mesmerized (1986; writer/director)
- Town & Country (2001; writer)
