= Michael Murphy (actor) =

American actor

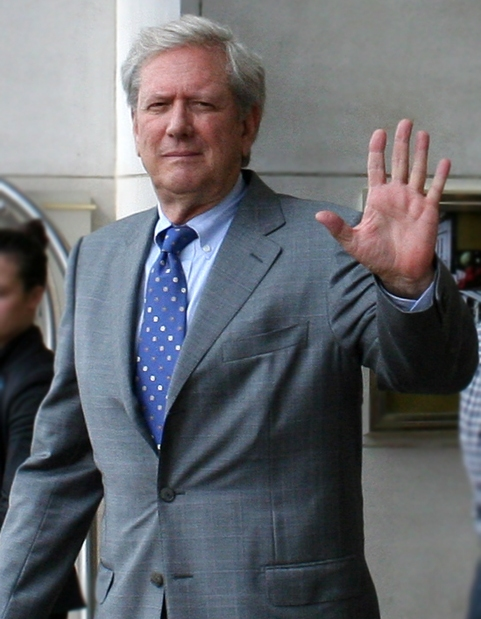
- Murphy in 2006
- Born: Michael George Murphy; May 5, 1938 (age 88); Los Angeles, California, U.S.
- Occupation: Actor
- Years active: 1963–present
- Height: 6 ft 1 in (185 cm)
- Spouse: Wendy Crewson (m. 1988; div. 2009)
- Children: 2

Michael George Murphy (born May 5, 1938) is an American film, television, stage and voiceover actor. He often plays unethical or morally ambiguous characters in positions of authority, including executives, politicians, diplomats, law enforcement agents, lawyers, judges, military commanders, academics, doctors and clerics. He is also known for his frequent collaborations with director Robert Altman, having appeared in twelve (more than any onscreen performer) film and television productions directed by Altman--between 1963 and 2004--a four-decade expanse which included his titular starring-turn in the Emmy Award-winning HBO cable miniseries Tanner '88.

Murphy has had roles in films M*A*S*H (1970), Brewster McCloud (1970), McCabe and Mrs. Miller (1971), What's Up, Doc? (1972), Phase IV (1974), Nashville (1975), The Front (1976), The Great Bank Hoax (1977), An Unmarried Woman (1978), The Class of Miss MacMichael (1978), Manhattan (1979), Strange Behavior (1981), The Year of Living Dangerously (1982), Cloak & Dagger (1984), My Letter to George (1985), Salvador (1986), Shocker (1989), Batman Returns (1992), Kansas City (1996), Private Parts (1997), Magnolia (1999), Silver City (2004), X-Men: The Last Stand (2006), Away from Her (2006), White House Down (2013), and Fall (2014). Murphy's performance in Fall earned him a nomination for a Canadian Screen Award for Best Lead Performance in a Drama Film. His work on the Canadian television series, This is Wonderland, earned him two Gemini Awards for Best Performance by an Actor in a Featured Supporting Role in a Dramatic Series in 2004 and 2005, and a third nomination in 2006.

== Early life ==
Murphy was born in Los Angeles, California, the son of Georgia Arlyn (née Money), a teacher, and Bearl Branton Murphy, a salesman. After serving in the U.S. Marine Corps, Murphy attended the University of Arizona and the University of California at Los Angeles (UCLA).

He taught English and drama at University High School before pursuing an acting career.

== Career ==
Murphy is best known for his performances as Jill Clayburgh's adulterous husband Martin Benton in Paul Mazursky's An Unmarried Woman (1978), as Woody Allen's morally ambiguous best friend Yale Pollack in Allen's Manhattan (1979), as the treasonous and menacing Dr. Rice in Richard Franklin's Hitchcockian thriller Cloak & Dagger (1984), as the serial killer-chasing Det. Lt. Don Parker in Wes Craven's Shocker (1989), as The Mayor of Gotham City in Tim Burton's Batman Returns (1992), as the ethically enigmatic attorney Alan Kligman, Esq. in Paul Thomas Anderson's Magnolia (1999), as the "mutant" Angel's human father (and crusading cure developer) Warren Worthington II in X-Men: The Last Stand (2006), and as the eponymous star of Garry Trudeau and Robert Altman's 1988 HBO cable miniseries Tanner '88.

Murphy worked frequently with Altman, including as Captain Ezekiel Bradbury "Me Lay" Marston V, in M*A*S*H (1970), as Det. Lt. Frank Shaft in Brewster McCloud (1970), as John Triplette in Nashville (1975), and as fictitious former U.S. Congressman and presidential aspirant, Jack Tanner, in Tanner '88, a role he later reprised in the 2004 Sundance Channel follow-up miniseries Tanner on Tanner. Other Altman films and television series in which Murphy appeared include the World War II TV series Combat!, Countdown (1968), That Cold Day in the Park (1969), McCabe & Mrs. Miller (1971), The Caine Mutiny Court-Martial (1988) and Kansas City (1996).

Other film roles include Count Yorga, Vampire (1970), What's Up, Doc? (1972), The Thief Who Came to Dinner (1973), The Front (1976), The Great Bank Hoax (1977), The Class of Miss MacMichael (1978), The Year of Living Dangerously (1982), My Letter to George (1986), Salvador (1986), Folks! (1992), Clean Slate (1994), Private Parts (1997), Silver City (2004), According to Greta (2009), White House Down (2013), They Came Together (2014) and Rolling Thunder Revue: A Bob Dylan Story by Martin Scorsese (2019).

Though usually cast in supporting roles and character parts, Murphy has also had leading turns in theatrical films Phase IV (1974), Manhattan (1979), Strange Behavior (1981), Hot Money (1983), Shocker (1989), The Island (1998) and the 2014 film Fall—in a performance that garnered him a nomination for a Canadian Screen Award for Best Lead Performance in a Drama Film in 2015, as well as in television films Bell, Book and Candle (1976), 3 by Cheever: O Youth and Beauty! (1979), Countdown to Looking Glass (1984), Tailspin: Behind the Korean Airliner Tragedy (1989), The Ultimate Lie (1996), Breaking the Surface: The Greg Louganis Story (1996), Indiscretion of an American Wife (1998) and In the Dark (2003).

In addition to his roles in the HBO Films original productions Tanner '88, Tailspin: Behind the Korean Airliner Tragedy, and Countdown to Looking Glass, Murphy has also appeared in the historical biopics Dead Ahead: The Exxon Valdez Disaster (1992), Truman (1995) and Live from Baghdad (2002).

Murphy starred in two primetime series: as Dr. Art Armstrong on the ABC family drama Two Marriages (1983-1984), and as jaded veteran reporter Andy Omart on the short-lived CBS newspaper drama Hard Copy (1987).

He has appeared extensively in Canadian film and television, including co-starring on the legal dramady series This Is Wonderland, as Judge Maxwell Fraser. For his work on the show, Murphy was nominated for three Gemini Awards, winning twice, successively, in 2004 and 2005, and nominated for a third in 2006. He was cast as casino executive Jimmy Molloy on the American ESPN drama Tilt (2005), as veteran law enforcement superior, Chief Ed Wycoff, on the Canadian CTV police drama The Bridge (2010), and as George Kelly, the father of Ethan Kelly, in the third season of the Canadian-British-American DirecTV police drama Rogue in 2015.

Murphy guest-starred on television series Bonanza, Ben Casey, Hogan's Heroes, The Sixth Sense, Premiere, Baretta, Law & Order, Law & Order: Criminal Intent, Judging Amy, The Man from U.N.C.L.E., Family Law, 12 O'Clock High, Lifestories, Here Comes the Brides, LAX, Person of Interest and L.A. Law.

He has appeared in Canadian television films and miniseries Sleeping Dogs Lie (1998), The Life and Crimes of William Palmer (1998), H_{2}O (2004), Hunt for Justice (2005), Playing House (2006), The Quality of Life (2008) and Great Scot Beer (2012), as well as a number of theatrically-released features including Tart (2001), Childstar (2004), Away from Her (2006), The Trotsky (2008) and Indian Horse (2017). Murphy's guest-starring turns on Canadian television series include E.N.G., Living in Your Car, Bury the Lead, Michael: Every Day and Street Legal.

Murphy has also been a narrator of documentary films, including several dozen episodes of the PBS historical documentary series The American Experience, as well as the public television travel series Weekends with Yankee.

== Personal life ==
Murphy was married to Canadian actress Wendy Crewson from 1988 until their divorce in January 2009. They have two children.

Murphy resides in Cape Elizabeth, Maine.

== Filmography ==
=== Film ===
Year	Title	Role	Notes	Ref(s)
1967	Double Trouble	Morley	Film debut; appeared opposite Elvis Presley	
1967	Countdown	Rick	First film collaboration with Robert Altman	
1968	The Legend of Lylah Clare	Mark Peter Sheehan		
1969	That Cold Day in the Park	The Rounder		
1969	The Arrangement	Father Draddy		
1970	The Lawyer	Intern in Legal Office	Uncredited role	
1970	Count Yorga, Vampire	Paul	AKA The Loves of Count Iorga, Vampire	
1970	M*A*S*H	Capt. Ezekiel Bradbury "Me Lay" Marston V	AKA MASH and M★A★S★H	
1970	Brewster McCloud	Det. Lt. Frank Shaft		
1971	McCabe & Mrs. Miller	Eugene Sears		
1972	Screwball Comedies... Remember Them?	Self / Mr. Smith (archive footage from What's Up, Doc?)	Documentary featurette	
1972	What's Up, Doc?	Mr. Smith	Directed by Peter Bogdanovich	
1973	The Thief Who Came to Dinner	Ted		
1974	Phase IV	Dr. James R. Lesko	Leading role	
1975	Nashville	John Triplette		
1976	The Front	Alfred Miller	First collaboration with Woody Allen	
1977	The Great Bank Hoax	Reverend Everett Manigma	AKA The Great Georgia Bank Hoax and Shenanigans	
1978	An Unmarried Woman	Martin Benton		
1978	The Class of Miss MacMichael	Martin Best		
1979	Manhattan	Yale Pollack	Leading role; only black-and-white screen appearance	
1981	Strange Behavior	Chief John Brady	Leading role; AKA Dead Kids; Small Town Massacre; Shadowlands and Human Experiments	
1982	The Year of Living Dangerously	Pete Curtis		
1983	Hot Money	Burt / Tom	Leading role; first Canadian film appearance; AKA Getting Centred; Never Trust an Honest Thief; Dinheiro Vivo; Zen Business; El gran robo; Going for Broke and The Great Madison County Robbery	
1984	Talk to Me	Ross		
1984	Cloak & Dagger	Rice		
1985	My Letter to George	Reverend Wilson	AKA Mesmerized and Shocked	
1986	Salvador	U.S. Ambassador Thomas Kelly		
1989	The Making of "Shocker"	Self / Interviewee / Det. Lt. Don Parker (archive footage from Shocker)	Video documentary featurette	
1989	Shocker	Det. Lt. Don Parker	Leading role; AKA Shocker: No More Mr. Nice Guy; Wes Craven's Shocker; Shocker: 100,000 voltios de terror	
1992	Folks!	Ed		
1992	Batman Returns	The Mayor		
1994	Clean Slate	Dr. Anthony Doover		
1995	Bad Company	William V. "Smitty" Smithfield	Uncredited role	
1996	Kansas City	Henry Stilton		
1997	Private Parts	Roger Erlick	AKA Howard Stern's Private Parts	
1998	The Island	President John F. Kennedy	Leading role; AKA Norma Jean, Jack & Me	
1999	Magnolia	Alan Kligman, Esq.		
2000	The Art of War	Politician	Uncredited cameo role	
2000	Enlisted: The Story of "M*A*S*H"	Self / Capt. Ezekiel Bradbury "Me Lay" Marston V (archive footage from M*A*S*H)	Video documentary featurette	
2001	Tart	Mike Storm	Cameo role; AKA Party Girl; Jet Set Kids; Teenage Seduction; Beautiful People and Fűvel-fával	
2004	Childstar	Reed Harrison		
2004	Silver City	U.S. Senator Judson Pilager		
2004	Tricks	Arthur	AKA Three Janes	
2005	Heights	Jesse	Cameo role	
2006	X-Men: The Last Stand	Warren Worthington II		
2006	Away From Her	Aubrey		
2008	A War in Hollywood	Alfred Miller (archive footage from The Front)	Documentary feature	
2008	Not Quite Hollywood: Deleted Scenes	Chief John Brady (archive footage from Strange Behavior)	Video documentary feature; AKA Not Quite Hollywood: Deleted and Extended Scenes	
2009	The Trotsky	Frank McGovern		
2009	According to Greta	Joseph	AKA Greta	
2011	Mulroney: The Opera	Col. Robert R. McCormick		
2013	White House Down	Vice President Alvin Hammond		
2013	The Making of "Nashville"	Self / John Triplette (archive footage from Nashville)	Video documentary featurette	
2014	Altman	Self/Interviewee	Documentary feature	
2014	Fall	Father Sam Ryan	Leading role	
2014	They Came Together	Roger		
2016	Close Encounters with Vilmos Zsigmond	Self/Interviewee	Documentary feature	
2016	McCabe & Mrs. Miller: Way Out on a Limb	Self/Interviewee	Video documentary featurette	
2017	Indian Horse	Father Quinney		
2018	Two Plains & a Fancy	Rancher	Cameo role	
2019	Rolling Thunder Revue: A Bob Dylan Story by Martin Scorsese	The Politician, Fmr. U.S. Congressman Jack Tanner	Cameo role	
2022	A Vampire in L.A.	Paul (archive footage from Count Yorga, Vampire)	Video documentary featurette	
2023	Film Geek	Martin Benton (archive footage from An Unmarried Woman)	Video	
2023	Film Essay - Robert Altman's "Brewster McCloud"	Det. Lt. Frank Shaft (archive footage from Brewster McCloud)	Video	
2024	Evolutions: The Making of "Phase IV"	Self / Dr. James R. Lesko (archive footage from Phase IV)	Video documentary featurette	
2024	Robert Altman: America's Rebel Director	Self / John Triplette (archive footage from Nashville)	Documentary feature	
2024	Cruel, Usual, Necessary: The Passion of Silvio Narizzano	Self/Interviewee	Documentary feature	
2026	Clever by Half: Michael Murphy on "Dead Kids"	Self / Interviewee / Chief John Brady (archive footage from Dead Kids/Strange Behavior)	Video documentary featurette	

=== Television ===
Year	Title	Role	Notes	Ref(s)
1963	Combat!	1st Tanker / Soldier in Hospital	2 episodes; first professional collaborations with Robert Altman	
1964, 1965	Ben Casey	Dr. J. Wells Savage / Dr. Paul Galloway / Andy Andrews	3 episodes	
1965	The Man from U.N.C.L.E.	Intern	1 episode	
1965	Dr. Kildare	Doctor at Meeting	1 episode	
1965	Hogan's Heroes	Corporal Walter Comminsky (uncredited)	1 episode	
1966	12 O'Clock High	Sergeant Marven	1 episode	
1968	Bonanza	Will Holt	1 episode	
1968	Premiere	William Smith	1 episode	
1968	Here Come the Brides	Ethan Weems	1 episode	
1972	The Sixth Sense	David Ford	1 episode	
1972	The Crooked Hearts	Officer Frank Adamic	TV movie	
1974	The Autobiography of Miss Jane Pittman	Quentin Lerner	TV movie	
1974	I Love You...Good-bye	Alec Shield	TV movie	
1975	Salty	Stock	1 episode	
1975	Baretta	Mike Parsons	1 episode	
1976	The Making of "The Front"	Self	TV documentary featurette	
1976	Bell, Book and Candle	Alex Brandt	TV pilot movie; leading role	
1978	Midday with Bill Boggs	Self/Guest/Interviewee	1 episode	
1979	3 by Cheever: O Youth and Beauty!	Cash Bentley	TV movie; leading role	
1981	Tomorrow Coast to Coast	Self/Guest/Interviewee	1 episode	
1982	The Rules of Marriage	Alan Murray	Miniseries	
1983-1984	Two Marriages	Dr. Art Armstrong	10 episodes; leading role; series regular	
1984	Countdown to Looking Glass	Bob Calhoun	TV movie; leading role	
1987	Hard Copy	Andy Omart	11 episodes; leading role; series regular	
1988	The Caine Mutiny Court-Martial	Captain Blakely	TV movie; AKA Herman Wouk's The Caine Mutiny Court-Martial	
1988	Tanner '88	Fmr. U.S. Congressman Jack Tanner	Miniseries; leading role	
1989	Tailspin: Behind the Korean Airliner Tragedy	Assistant U.S. Secretary of State Richard Burt	TV movie; leading role; AKA Coded Hostile	
1990	Lifestories	Frank Brody	1 episode	
1990	E.N.G.	Steve Kurtz	1 episode	
1992	Dead Ahead: The Exxon Valdez Disaster	U.S. EPA Administrator William K. Reilly	TV movie	
1992	Screen One	U.S. EPA Administrator William K. Reilly	1 episode	
1993	L.A. Law	Bobby Lewis	1 episode	
1995	The First 100 Years: A Celebration of American Movies	John Triplette / Yale Pollack (uncredited - archive footage from Nashville and Manhattan)	TV documentary feature	
1995	Truman	Dinner Speaker	TV movie; uncredited cameo role	
1996	Robert Altman: Giggle and Give In	Self	TV special	
1996	Special Report: Journey to Mars	Dean Rumplemeyer	TV movie	
1996	The Ultimate Lie	Malcolm McGrath	TV movie; leading role	
1997	Breaking the Surface: The Greg Louganis Story	Pete Louganis	TV movie; leading role	
1998	The Irish in America: Long Journey Home	Narrator	Miniseries; leading role	
1998	The Life and Crimes of William Palmer	Smith	Miniseries	
1998	Indiscretion of an American Wife	Russell Burton	TV movie; leading role	
1998	Sleeping Dogs Lie	Edgar Tratt	TV movie; AKA Le mystère d'Ambrose Small	
2000	The Only Living Boy in New York	Rudy	TV movie	
2000	Altman on His Own Terms	Self	TV documentary feature	
2000	Twentieth Century Fox: The Blockbuster Years	Martin Benton (archive footage from An Unmarried Woman)	TV documentary feature	
2000	Judging Amy	Judge Alistair McNeil	1 episode	
2000	Family Law	Ian Lumberg	1 episode	
2001	Law & Order	Nolan Tinsdale	1 episode	
2001	The Day Reagan Was Shot	White House Deputy Chief of Staff Michael Deaver	TV movie	
2002	Law & Order: Criminal Intent	Judge Peter Blakemore	1 episode	
2002	Woody Allen: A Life in Film	Yale Pollack (uncredited - archive footage from Manhattan)	TV documentary feature	
2002	Live from Baghdad	Tom Johnson	TV movie	
2002-2020	The American Experience	Narrator	35 episodes; leading role; series regular	
2003	Bury the Lead	Arthur	1 episode	
2003	Footsteps	Robbie Lowendahl	TV movie	
2003	In the Dark	George Speller	TV movie; leading role	
2004	LAX	Emmet	1 episode	
2004	American Masters – Julia! America's Favorite Chef	Narrator	TV documentary feature	
2004	Behind the Scenes: Tanner on Tanner	Self / Interviewee / Fmr. U.S. Congressman Jack Tanner (archive footage from Tanner '88 and Tanner on Tanner)	TV documentary featurette	
2004	Tanner on Tanner	Fmr. U.S. Congressman Jack Tanner	Miniseries; leading role; final professional collaboration with Robert Altman	
2004	What's Happened Since '88	Self / Interviewee / Fmr. U.S. Congressman Jack Tanner (archive footage from Tanner '88 and Tanner on Tanner)	TV documentary featurette	
2004	The Path to 9/11	U.S. Secretary of Defense William Cohen	Miniseries	
2004	H_{2}O	U.S. Ambassador Conrad	Miniseries	
2004-2006	This Is Wonderland	Judge Maxwell Fraser	39 episodes; series regular	
2005	Tilt	Jimmy Molloy	9 episodes; series regular	
2005	Mayday	Captain Randall Williams	TV movie	
2005	Hunt for Justice	General Salinski	TV movie	
2006	Playing House	Hubbard	TV movie	
2006	The Wind in the Willows	Judge	TV movie; cameo role; AKA Kenneth Grahame's The Wind in the Willows	
2008	80th National Board of Review Awards	Self	TV special	
2008	Caring for Your Parents	Narrator	TV documentary feature	
2008	Depression: Out of the Shadows	Narrator	TV documentary feature	
2008	The Quality of Life	Charles Greenborne	TV movie	
2009	China Rises	Narrator	TV documentary feature	
2010	The Bridge	Chief Ed Wycoff	13 episodes; series regular	
2010	Living in Your Car	Frank	1 episode	
2011	Michael: Every Day	Stanley Dyer	1 episode	
2011	Person of Interest	U.S. Congressman Jim Hallen	1 episode	
2011	India Reborn	Narrator	TV documentary feature	
2011	Angle of Attack: How Naval Aviation Changed the Face of War	Narrator	TV documentary feature	
2012	Great Scot Beer	Randy	TV movie	
2014	Pop Culture Beast's Halloween Horror Picks	Chief John Brady (uncredited - archive footage from Strange Behavior/Dead Kids)	1 episode	
2015	3rd Canadian Screen Awards	Self/Nominee/Presenter	TV special	
2015	Rogue	George Kelly	10 episodes; short-term series regular	
2018-2019	Weekends with Yankee	Narrator	26 episodes; leading role; series regular	
2019	Street Legal	Henry Czernik	2 episodes	

== Theatre ==
Year	Title	Role	Notes	Ref(s)
1964	Take Her, She's Mine	Alex Loomis	Valley Music Theatre, Los Angeles, CA; stage acting debut	
1969-1970	Our Town	Sam Craig / Baseball Player	Huntington Hartford Theatre, Los Angeles, CA; ANTA Playhouse, New York City, NY; The Plumstead Playhouse (at The Coconut Grove Playhouse), Miami, FL	
1978	Rat's Nest	director	Vandam Theatre (then known as Grove Street Theatre), New York City, NY – 1978; stage directorial and producorial debuts	
1981	The Hotel Play	Psychiatrist	La MaMa Experimental Theatre Club, New York City, NY	
1983	Playing in Local Bands	Michael	Yale Repertory Theatre, New Haven, CT	
1985	Curse of the Starving Class	director	Portland Stage Company, Portland, ME	
1985	Goodbye Freddy	Hank	Manhattan Punch Line Theatre, New York City, NY; INTAR Theatre, New York City, NY	
1992	Near the End of the Century	Richard	George Street Playhouse, New Brunswick, NJ	
