= Tanner on Tanner =

2004 American TV miniseries by Robert Altman

- Written by: Garry Trudeau
- Directed by: Robert Altman
- Starring: Michael Murphy; Cynthia Nixon; Pamela Reed; Matt Malloy; Ilana Levine
- Country of origin: United States
- Original language: English
- No. of episodes: 4

Production
- Running time: 109 minutes (total)

Original release
- Network: Sundance Channel
- Release: October 5 – October 26, 2004

Related
- Tanner '88

Tanner on Tanner is a 2004 four-part comedy miniseries. It is the sequel to the 1988 Robert Altman-directed and Garry Trudeau-written miniseries about a failed presidential candidate, Tanner '88. The sequel focuses mostly on Alex Tanner (Cynthia Nixon), a struggling filmmaker and the daughter of onetime presidential candidate Jack Tanner (Michael Murphy).

== Episodes ==
- "Dinner at Elaine's" (October 5, 2004)
- "Boston or Bust" (October 12, 2004)
- "Alex in Wonderland" (October 19, 2004)
- "The Awful Truth" (October 26, 2004)

== Plot ==
Alex Tanner is working on a documentary about her father's run for president in 1988. After her documentary, My Candidate, is met with an underwhelming response at an independent film festival, Robert Redford advises her that her film is lacking and that she should do follow-ups with all the people from the 1988 campaign to see what they are doing now, and get their reflections on their past roles.

Alex does just this, interviewing most of the old campaign staffers and her father before going to the 2004 Democratic Convention in Boston with her film crew to compare and contrast it with the 1988 Democratic National Convention where her father lost the nomination. Along the way, one of her crew members, Salim (Aasif Mandvi), is repeatedly stopped and frisked by police because of his Arab ethnicity. There she meets up with TJ, her father's old campaign manager, who is now advising John Kerry. While TJ provides assistance to Alex, she also advises Jack that he is being considered for a position in the administration, should Kerry win the election. She says he would need to make sure footage from Alex's documentary of him attacking the Iraq War is removed and destroyed, so as not to potentially embarrass Kerry. Jack asks Alex to remove and destroy the footage, which she considers the best part of her documentary. Alex becomes very upset and disillusioned with her father. (It is also implied that she has had a falling out with him.) She eventually destroys her whole film, looking to move on with her life.

== Cast ==
- Michael Murphy as Fmr. Michigan U.S. Congressman Jack Tanner
- Cynthia Nixon as Alexandra "Alex" Tanner
- Pamela Reed as T.J. Cavanaugh
- Matt Malloy as Deke Conners
- Ilana Levine as Andrea Spinelli
- Jim Fyfe as Emile Berkoff
- Luke Macfarlane as Stuart DeBarge
- Aasif Mandvi as Salim Barik
- Greg Procaccino as Barney Kittman

=== Cameo appearances ===
- Martin Scorsese as Self
- Steve Buscemi as Self
- Dina Merrill as Self
- Ted Hartley as Self
- Harry Belafonte as Self
- Elaine Kaufman as Self
- Robert Redford as Self
- Al Franken as Self
- Janeane Garofalo as Self
- Michael Moore as Self
- Tom Brokaw as Self
- Chris Matthews as Self
- Charlie Rose as Self
- Carl Bernstein as Self
- Ron Reagan as Self
- Alexandra Kerry as Self
- Dee Dee Myers as Self
- John Podesta as Self
- Massachusetts U.S. Senator John Kerry as Self
- North Carolina U.S. Senator John Edwards as Self
- Connecticut U.S. Senator Joseph Lieberman as Self
- Florida U.S. Senator Bob Graham as Self
- Delaware U.S. Senator Joe Biden as Self
- Georgia U.S. Senator Max Cleland as Self
- Fmr. District of Columbia Shadow U.S. Senator, The Reverend Jesse Jackson as Self
- Fmr. Missouri U.S. Congressman Dick Gephardt as Self
- Vermont Governor Howard Dean as Self
- Fmr. New York Governor Mario Cuomo as Self
- Fmr. Massachusetts Governor Michael Dukakis as Self
- Fmr. Massachusetts First Lady Kitty Dukakis as Self
- Fmr. U.S. President Jimmy Carter as Self
- Fmr. U.S. President Bill Clinton as Self
- Fmr. U.S. Vice President Al Gore as Self
- Fmr. U.S. Secretary of State Madeleine Albright as Self
- Illinois State Senator Barack Obama as Self
- Fmr. California State Senator Art Torres as Self
- The Reverend Al Sharpton as Self
- John Mellencamp as Self
- The Black Eyed Peas as Themselves

== Production ==
As with the first film, this film features many cameos by politicians, mainstream media figures, and celebrities including: Robert Redford, Al Franken, Janeane Garofalo, Joe Lieberman, Tom Brokaw, Ron Reagan Jr., John Kerry, Alexandra Kerry, Michael Dukakis, Chris Matthews, Dee Dee Myers, Dick Gephardt, Barack Obama, Michael Moore, Steve Buscemi, Bill Clinton, Charlie Rose, Stacey Ferguson (with The Black Eyed Peas), Dina Merrill, Mario Cuomo and Martin Scorsese.
