= Strange Behavior =

1981 slasher film

- Theatrical release poster
- Directed by: Michael Laughlin
- Written by: Bill Condon; Michael Laughlin
- Produced by: Antony I. Ginnane; John Barnett
- Starring: Michael Murphy; Louise Fletcher; Dan Shor; Fiona Lewis; Arthur Dignam
- Cinematography: Louis Horvath
- Edited by: Petra von Oelffen
- Music by: Tangerine Dream
- Production companies: Hemdale; Fay Richwhite; South Street Films; Gupta Film Services; Flavius Films; Endeavour Productions; Bannon Glen
- Distributed by: GUO Film Distributors (Australia); Endeavour Productions (New Zealand); World Northal (US)
- Release dates: 16 October 1981 (U.S.); 17 June 1982 (Australia)
- Running time: 94 minutes
- Countries: Australia; New Zealand; United Kingdom
- Language: English
- Budget: $1 million

Strange Behavior (also known as Dead Kids, Small Town Massacre, Shadowlands, Human Experiments) is a 1981 slasher film written, directed and co-produced by Michael Laughlin, co-written with Bill Condon, and starring Michael Murphy, Louise Fletcher and Dan Shor. Its plot follows a series of bizarre murders being perpetrated against teenagers in a small Midwestern town, at the same time that the local university is engaging in covert mind control experiments on the youth.

An international co-production between the United Kingdom, New Zealand, and Australia, the film was intended as the first instalment of the Strange Trilogy which was cancelled after the second instalment, Strange Invaders, failed to attract a large enough audience. It is a homage to the pulp horror films of the 1950s. The film is considered a seminal work of New Zealand cinema, being the first horror film produced in the country. It has since attracted a large cult following.

While not prosecuted for obscenity, the film was seized and confiscated in the UK under Section 3 of the Obscene Publications Act 1959 during the video nasty panic.

== Plot ==
Bryan, the son of the Galesburg, Illinois mayor, is brutally murdered in his home, his body later found stuffed and posed as a scarecrow. Local policeman John Brady begins investigating the murder. Meanwhile, John's son, Pete, a high school senior, sits in on a course at Galesburg University with his friend, Oliver. During the course, professor Gwen Parkinson screens a lecture by her late mentor, Dr. Le Sange, whom Pete's late mother, Catherine, once worked for. After the lecture, Pete agrees to become one of Gwen's test subjects in order to earn money for his college applications. Later, Pete attends a house party. During the party, one of his classmates, Waldo, is stabbed to death outside by a masked assailant, and Waldo's girlfriend Lucy is attacked and falls into the swimming pool. Pete and several others rush to save her, and the masked attacker flees; in the distance, he removes his mask, revealing himself to be Oliver. John subsequently questions Oliver, who says he cannot recall the events of the party as he was drunk.

Medical examiners observe that Waldo's corpse has a bizarre surgical incision near his eye, and, upon scrutinizing the evidence, John concludes that two different people are responsible for the murders of Waldo and Bryan. Meanwhile, Pete attends one of Gwen's studies at a large laboratory, which hosts both human and animal tests. Gwen has Pete swallow a pill and repeat several words before dismissing him. After, he invites Caroline, a college student who works the front desk at the laboratory, on a date, and the two quickly begin a romance. The following day, a woman finds her son, Timothy, being dismembered in her bathroom by an unknown young woman; she phones police before being stabbed, and manages to tell her friend Mildred over the phone sparse details about the girl's appearance before having her throat slashed.

John, suspecting the female assailant may be one of Gwen's test subjects, confronts Gwen at the laboratory, unaware of the fact that Pete is in one of the test rooms, tied to a chair. After John leaves, Gwen resumes the session, in which she injects a fluid into Pete's eye. After he awakens and is dismissed, Pete goes to have dinner with Caroline at a local Steak 'n Shake restaurant, but becomes violently ill in the diner's men's restroom. Meanwhile, John has a conversation with his girlfriend, Barbara, about the murders: he deduces that each of the victims are sons of men who previously collaborated with John to investigate the unethical experiments of Le Sange, and believes Le Sange is, in fact, alive, and exacting revenge. Barbara follows John to the cemetery, where he breaks into Le Sange's crypt, and finds the casket empty, except for two skeletonised lower legs. John and Barbara return home and find a confused Pete along with Caroline.

John retrieves a revolver, shotgun and ammunition and then makes his way to the university. Barbara meanwhile recounts to Pete and Caroline how Pete's mother, Catherine, acted strangely during her employment under Le Sange, and that her subsequent unexplained death spurned John's initial investigation into the program. Pete and Caroline decide to follow after John to the university. Pete enters a chamber where John is communicating with Gwen, who appears on a small television. Gwen orders Pete, now in a daze from her mind control methods, to take his father's gun. Gwen appears in the room, whereafter a legless and wheelchairbound elderly man enters, revealing himself to be Le Sange disguised as an elderly man. He expounds that his methods of mind control will help the world, before proceeding to instruct Pete to slash his own wrists, which he does, before instructing him to stab his father to death. Pete responds by stabbing Le Sange in the throat, and declaring that he "is his father," revealing that Pete's mother, Catherine, had an affair with Le Sange, and John is not actually Pete's biological father. Police subsequently arrive and Gwen is arrested.

Some time later, Pete, healed from the experiment, attends his father's wedding to Barbara with Caroline.

== Cast ==
- Michael Murphy as Chief John Brady
- Louise Fletcher as Barbara Moorehead
- Dan Shor as Pete Brady
- Fiona Lewis as Gwen Parkinson
- Arthur Dignam as Dr. Le Sange
- Dey Young as Caroline
- Marc McClure as Oliver Myerhoff
- Charles Lane as Donovan
- Scott Brady as Detective Shea
- Beryl Te Wiata as Mrs. Haskell
- Elizabeth Cheshire as Lucy Brown
- Jim Boelsen as Waldo
- Nicole Massie as Sarah (billed as Nicole Anderson)
- B. Courtenay Leigh as Paula
- Bill Condon as Bryan Morgan
- Pete Walker as 1st Killer
- William Hayward as Mr. Robinson
- Billy Al Bengston as Felix Rowe
- Alma Woods as Mildred
- Jack Haines as Mayor Randall Morgan
- Susanna Moore as Steak 'n Shake Waitress
- Jessica Kenny as Catherine Brady

== Production ==
In the 70s, Bill Condon was living in Los Angeles while attending UCLA film school. Before qualification for his residency elapsed, he took a job at Avco Embassy Pictures working for then head Robert Rehme. Condon continued to write articles for film magazines while working at his full time position. One of Condon's articles penned for Millimeter in 1978 was read by Michael Laughlin who then called Condon and offered him a job which lead to their teaming on Dead Kids.

Though set in Galesburg, Illinois, USA, the film was shot in Auckland, New Zealand, and filmed under the title Dead Kids.

The Encyclopedia of Horror designates the film as a New Zealand film. It lists several of the similar productions of its Australian producer Antony I Ginnane and frequent collaborator David Hemmings, who is Executive Producer of this film through the Hemdale Film Corporation. The book opines that "Dead Kids must count as one of their most professional efforts."

== Release ==
The film premiered in New York City on 16 October 1981, and subsequently opened in Los Angeles on 13 November 1981.

=== Critical response ===
Strange Behavior received largely favourable reviews upon its release. Janet Maslin of The New York Times noted that the pacing was at times slow, but praised the performance of Michael Murphy as the small-town police chief and impelled-into hero, stating "Mr. Murphy displays both the banality and the stalwart courage of which all such movie characters were once made," and as the female mad scientist, the role was "played marvelously by Fiona Lewis," and concluded that the film "belongs to two movie species, both of them nearly extinct. It's a 1950s mad-scientist movie, or at least a very fond and painstaking reincarnation of same. And it's a small, original, offbeat film of the sort that is out of fashion." Kevin Thomas of the Los Angeles Times wrote of the film: "Grisly but sly, Strange Behavior is the genre film at its most knowing and controlled... As an exploitation picture, it plays on the layman's deep-rooted fear of science tampering with nature." In the New York Daily News, Rex Reed praised the film, writing: "Strange Behavior is a horror movie that shows how to succeed in grisly gore without really trying, and moreover, how to do it while being intentionally funny at the same time. It is genuinely chilling, constantly imaginative, and full of exquisite throwaway comedy." Rob Gonsalves of Letterboxd called Strange Behavior "An off-the-wall horror film," and noted "director Michael Laughlin knows how to set up good, pleasant scares." Gonsalves also noted that "the acting is solid," and "Michael Murphy is excellent as a police chief who has a beef."

Some critics were less laudatory of the film, such as Bernard Drew of The Journal News, who deemed the film "awkwardly plotted" and "little more than a rehash of all the old "B" horror movies of the '30s." Despite the overall dislike he felt toward the film, he did shortlist the film's leading star saying, "Murphy, a good actor who never seems to get the roles he deserves, does his intelligent best as the cop."

=== Home media ===
The film was released on VHS by RCA/Columbia Pictures Home Video in the United States. In the United Kingdom, the film was released on VHS under the title Small Town Massacre in 1983.

The film was released twice on DVD in the United States, first by Elite Entertainment on 6 May 2003. and then by Synapse Films in 2008. The DVD included deleted scenes, a photo gallery, an isolated music score by Tangerine Dream, a Spanish-dubbed track, U.S. and Australian theatrical trailers and filmographies.

The film was released on Blu-ray/DVD combo pack by Severin Films under its New Zealand title, Dead Kids in 2014.

A novelisation of the film was published in 1982 under the title "School Days" by Robert Hughes.

== Soundtrack ==
The soundtrack features electronic music by Tangerine Dream. Also included are songs "The Ritz" and "Jumping Out a Window" by Pop Mechanix, "Shivers" by The Birthday Party, and "Lightnin' Strikes" by Lou Christie. "The Ritz" and "Lightnin' Strikes" are heard at a teenage costume party during which characters (including two enacted by Ngila Dickson and Peta Rutter) spontaneously perform a synchronised dance routine to "Lightnin' Strikes". The soundtrack was not officially released until 1 April 2022, on CD by the label Buy Soundtrack and on LP for the Record Store Day by the label Terrorvision; Some of the Tangerine Dream tracks are available on the fan release Tangerine Tree 50: Assorted Secrets 2 and another bootleg CD with the complete score was released by Film Music Treasury.

== Sources ==
- Fischer, Dennis (2011). Science Fiction Film Directors, 1895-1998. Jefferson, North Carolina: McFarland. ISBN 978-0-786-46091-5.
