= Strange Invaders =

1983 American science fiction film

- Promotional movie poster for the film
- Directed by: Michael Laughlin
- Written by: Bill Condon; Michael Laughlin; Walter Halsey Davis
- Produced by: Walter Coblenz
- Starring: Paul Le Mat; Nancy Allen; Diana Scarwid; Michael Lerner; Louise Fletcher
- Cinematography: Louis Horvath
- Edited by: John W. Wheeler
- Music by: John Addison
- Production company: Thorn EMI Screen Entertainment
- Distributed by: Orion Pictures
- Release date: September 16, 1983
- Running time: 94 minutes
- Country: United States
- Language: English
- Budget: $5.5 million
- Box office: $1.4 million

Strange Invaders is a 1983 American science fiction film directed and co-written by Michael Laughlin, and stars Paul Le Mat, Nancy Allen and Diana Scarwid.

Produced as a tribute to the sci-fi films of the 1950s, notably The Invasion of the Body Snatchers, it was intended to be the second installment of the aborted Strange Trilogy with Strange Behavior (1981), another 1950s spoof by Laughlin, but the idea was abandoned after Invaders failed to attract a large audience. Scarwid's performance earned her a nomination for Golden Raspberry Award for Worst Supporting Actress at the 4th Golden Raspberry Awards.

== Plot ==
In 1958, the town of Centreville, Illinois is quietly invaded by extraterrestrial aliens. The aliens fire mysterious beams of energy from their hands and eyes, which turn the town's inhabitants into crystalized pulsing blue orbs. Using artificial skin and hair, the invaders then assume the identities of their victims and cover up the invasion.

Twenty-five years later, Columbia University lecturer Charles Bigelow learns that his ex-wife, Margaret, has disappeared while attending her mother's funeral in Centerville, and travels there to find her. He finds the town kept perfectly as it was in 1958 by the aliens, which arouses suspicion and eventually triggers the aliens to try and capture Charles when they fail to convince him otherwise. Charles escapes, but the aliens manage to snatch his dog, Louie.

Charles sees a photo of an alien in a tabloid magazine and, with the help of journalist Betty Walker, finds Margaret, who is now revealed to be one of the aliens. She asks Charles to escape with Elizabeth, their human/alien hybrid daughter, as the aliens are preparing to return to their home world and she does not want to subject Elizabeth to a life not of her own choosing. Charles and Elizabeth escape from the departing alien ship as the aliens shed their human skins and depart. The orbs containing the town's real inhabitants are then restored to their original selves. Charles, Elizabeth, and Betty happily start walking out of town, reunited with Louie.

== Cast ==
- Paul Le Mat as Charles Bigelow
- Nancy Allen as Betty Walker
- Diana Scarwid as Margaret
- Michael Lerner as Willie Collins
- Louise Fletcher as Mrs. Benjamin
- Wallace Shawn as Earl
- Fiona Lewis as Waitress/Avon Lady
- Kenneth Tobey as Arthur Newman
- June Lockhart as Mrs. Bigelow
- Charles Lane as Professor Hollister
- Lulu Sylbert as Elizabeth Bigelow
- Jack Kehler as Gas Station Attendant

== Production ==
=== Development ===
Director Michael Laughlin teamed with Bill Condon, his co-writer and associate producer from Strange Behavior. The first image Laughlin came up with was that of a midwest landscape with an "old-fashioned mothership sliding in".

He wrote the first few pages himself and then he and Condon completed the screenplay in two parts, each writing different sections. They wrote the script without any deal in place but were confident that it was going to be made into a film. They even figured out the budget, scouted locations, cast the actors, and worked on the production design while arranging the financing. This pre-production was all done at the expense of Condon and Laughlin.

The film was a take-off of science fiction films of the 1950s. "I think that's when all this science-fiction view of the future was invented - the current idea of the future," said Laughlin. "America thought it had conquered the world. The Germans were no longer anything to worry about. The Japanese had been defeated. The only thing that sent a possible tingle through your spine was an invasion from outer space."

To help produce the film, Laughlin brought in his friend Walter Coblenz, who had been the assistant director on the Laughlin-produced film Two-Lane Blacktop. They shopped the script for Strange Invaders around Hollywood.

=== Financing ===
Laughlin's previous film, Strange Behavior, had been released by a small distributor and this time around he wanted his film to be handled by a major. Orion Pictures liked the script and was looking for a good film at a modest price with mainstream appeal. Orion provided half of the film's $5.5 million budget with England's EMI Films coming up with the rest. Orion received distribution rights for North America while EMI handled the rest of the world. As part of the financing deal, Orion and EMI demanded several script changes, which Condon and Laughlin found difficult, because they had to try to explain their ideas verbally.

The financial backers influence reduced the film's scope. For example, in the original script, the American government was a much bigger threat, with a big sequence taking place at an Air Force base. These changes bothered Laughlin, because they resulted in a lack of a well-defined middle section in the script.

=== Casting ===
Orion and EMI also influenced the casting process and approved every choice Laughlin made. The original script was written with Michael Murphy in mind to play Charles Bigelow — he had been in Strange Behavior — but EMI refused to allow him to be cast much to the director's confusion "because there didn't seem to be a good reason for his rejection. I guess it was a matter of personal taste". Orion and EMI suggested Mel Gibson and Powers Boothe instead but Laughlin's choice was Paul Le Mat, because he had not played that kind of role before and had a "Joel McCrea quality" that he was seeking.

For the role of Betty Walker, Laughlin wanted an actress from New York and not someone from California playing a New Yorker. Condon was a big fan of Brian De Palma's films and Nancy Allen who appeared in several of them. Louise Fletcher's government agent character Mrs. Benjamin was originally written as a man, a "Bob Balaban bureaucrat", but during the screenwriting process, Condon and Laughlin decided to change the character to a woman and cast Fletcher who had been in Strange Behavior.

=== Shooting ===
Filming took place in Canada in August 1982 in Claremont.

Condon and Laughlin created a visual plan in advance and this helped them shoot the film quickly — in only five weeks. Laughlin was helped out by a second unit that worked on the film's visual and prosthetic effects. He hired Private Stock Effects to work on the visual effects. They had previously worked on Battle Beyond the Stars and Escape from New York. For the prosthetic alien effects, he hired James Cummins, a veteran of the John Carpenter film The Thing, and later, the writer and director of the cult horror classic The Boneyard, who had his name removed from the credits after heated debates with Laughlin about the way the effects were being used and shot. Laughlin relented and allowed Cummins to reshoot a lengthy scene near the end of the film where the aliens shed their human guises as they prepare to embark on a 1950s style spacecraft. Laughlin planned a third film in a proposed Strange Trilogy, titled, The Adventures of Philip Strange, a World War II spy thriller with science fiction elements and hoped to cast many of the same actors and crew from his two previous films.

== Reception ==
In his review for The New York Times, Vincent Canby called it, "a tasteful monster movie with a terrible secret: it eats other movies". Newsweek magazine's David Ansen wrote, "Hovering unclassifiably between nostalgia and satire, this amiably hip genre movie confirms Laughlin as a deliberately minor but unique stylist. It's up to the viewer to determine just how faux his naif style is, but either way you choose to take it, Strange Invaders offers a good deal of laid-back fun". Jay Scott in his review for The Globe and Mail wrote, "Strange Invaders is a pastiche, a film-school jumble of aphorisms and winks at the audience that are neither as knowing nor as amusing as they are meant to be".

Colin Greenland reviewed Strange Invaders for Imagine magazine, and stated that "Strange Invaders never quite makes up its mind whether it's a send-up or a faithful recreation of The Invasion of the Body Snatchers; It Came From Outer Space; The Bubble; etc. It hovers somewhere in between: too naïve to be convincing, too self-conscious to be allegorical."

Laughlin said ""It turned out the way I wanted it to and the fact that others agree makes me feel great".

=== Box office ===
The film was a box office disappointment.

== Notes ==
- Jones, Alan (February 1984). "Strange Creator". Starburst. pp. 33–37.
