= Tanner '88 =

American television mockumentary miniseries

- Series DVD cover
- Created by: Garry Trudeau
- Directed by: Robert Altman
- Starring: Michael Murphy; Pamela Reed; Cynthia Nixon; Kevin J. O'Connor; Daniel Jenkins; Jim Fyfe; Matt Malloy; Ilana Levine; Veronica Cartwright; Richard Cox; Wendy Crewson
- Country of origin: United States
- No. of episodes: 11

Production
- Executive producers: Robert Altman; Garry Trudeau
- Camera setup: Multiple camera
- Running time: 1-hour premiere, all others approx. 30 minutes

Original release
- Network: HBO
- Release: February 15 – August 22, 1988

Related
- Tanner on Tanner

Tanner '88 is a political mockumentary miniseries written by Garry Trudeau and directed by Robert Altman. First broadcast by HBO during the months leading up to the 1988 U.S. presidential election, it purports to tell the behind-the-scenes story of the campaign of fictitious former Michigan U.S. Representative Jack Tanner, played by Michael Murphy, during his bid to secure the Democratic Party's nomination for president of the United States.

The story is told from a number of different points of view, including Tanner, his campaign staff, the small army of news reporters that constantly follow the candidate, and volunteers. Many political figures of the time appear (some in cameos, some extended), including Bruce Babbitt, Bob Dole, Kitty Dukakis, Gary Hart, Jesse Jackson, and Pat Robertson. Trudeau and Altman revisited the story 16 years later in Tanner on Tanner.

== Plot summary ==
Former U.S. Representative Jack Tanner of Michigan (Michael Murphy) is an obscure liberal Democratic politician who struggles to find a voice in the early 1988 Democratic primaries. His campaign manager, T.J. Cavanaugh (Pamela Reed), uses an unscripted, impassioned hotel-room speech caught on camera as part of an advertising campaign focusing on Tanner's authenticity and integrity. Using the slogan "For Real", Tanner emerges from a wide field of contenders to battle for the nomination against two high-profile and better-funded candidates: Jesse Jackson and eventual nominee Massachusetts Governor Michael Dukakis.

With Tanner are his college-aged daughter Alexandra (Cynthia Nixon), whose illness was why he earlier left politics and who has left college for the duration of the campaign, and his girlfriend Joanna Buckley (Wendy Crewson), Dukakis' deputy campaign manager. Others who appear on camera are Emile Berkoff (Jim Fyfe), a compulsive statistician with a crush on Alexandra; Deke Conners (Matt Malloy), an East Village filmmaker hired to produce Tanner campaign ads; and Andrea Spinelli (Ilana Levine), T.J.'s innocent and ditzy but well-meaning assistant. The candidate's father, General John Tanner (E.G. Marshall), who has a contentious relationship with his son, also occasionally appears.

Although Tanner does not win the nomination, he does run a serious and credible race. The series ends on a cliffhanger after Dukakis officially becomes the Democratic candidate and Tanner considers a third party/independent run in '88.

== Cast ==
- Michael Murphy as Fmr. Michigan U.S. Congressman Jack Tanner
- Pamela Reed as T.J. Cavanaugh
- Cynthia Nixon as Alexandra "Alex" Tanner
- Kevin J. O'Connor as Hayes Taggerty
- Daniel Jenkins as Stringer Kincaid
- Jim Fyfe as Emile Berkoff
- Matt Malloy as Deke Conners
- Ilana Levine as Andrea Spinelli
- Sandra Bowie as Stevie Chevalier
- Greg Procaccino as Barney Kittman
- Veronica Cartwright as Molly Hart
- Richard Cox as David Seidelman
- Frank Barhydt as Frank Gattling
- Wendy Crewson as Joanna Buckley
- E.G. Marshall as U.S. Gen. John Tanner

=== Also appearing ===
- Cleavon Little as The Reverend Billy Crier
- Harry Anderson as Billy Ridenhour
- John Considine as Duke Crodian
- Robert Gerringer as Farmer Bob
- Patricia Falkenhain as Mrs. Bob
- Jeff Daniels as Park Ranger
- David Allen Grier as Secret Serviceman
- Ned Bellamy as Secret Serviceman
- Julius Carry as Secret Serviceman
- Cameron Thor as Secret Serviceman
- Betty Lee Bogue as Quilt Show Owner
- Stephen Altman as Rogan

=== Cameo appearances ===
- Fmr. Arizona Governor Bruce Babbitt as Self
- Massachusetts First Lady Kitty Dukakis as Self
- Fmr. Colorado U.S. Senator Gary Hart as Self
- Kansas U.S. Senator Bob Dole as Self (uncredited)
- The Reverend Jesse Jackson as Self (uncredited)
- The Reverend Pat Robertson as Self (uncredited)
- Waylon Jennings as Self
- Danny Darst as Self
- John Cowan as Self
- Lorianne Crook as Self
- Charlie Chase as Self
- Rebecca De Mornay as Self
- Linda Ellerbee as Self
- Mary McGrory as Self
- Chris Matthews as Self
- Tom Brokaw as Self
- Sidney Blumenthal as Self
- Peter Edelman as Self
- Bob Squier as Self
- Dorothy Sarnoff as Self
- Patricia Derian as Self
- Lynne Russell as Self
- Randall Robinson as Self
- G. David Hughes as Self
- Michigan Governor James J. Blanchard as Self
- Connecticut U.S. Senator Lowell Weicker as Self
- Texas U.S. Congressman Mickey Leland as Self
- Massachusetts U.S. Congressman Ed Markey as Self
- Fmr. U.S. Assistant Secretary of State Hodding Carter III as Self
- Speaker of the Tennessee House of Representatives Ed Murray as Self
- Tennessee State Representative Lois DeBerry as Self
- Tennessee State Representative Robert S. Stallings as Self
- Tennessee State Representative Thomas C. Wheeler as Self
- Joan Cushing as Self
- New Grass Revival as Themselves
- The Danny Darst Band as Themselves
- Harlow as Themselves

=== Tanner's cabinet nominees ===
Several members of Tanner's prospective cabinet are mentioned, with several making statements to the press accepting the appointment should he become president. Those mentioned include:

- Lee H. Hamilton, prospective Secretary of State (on-screen cameo)
- Lee Iacocca, prospective Secretary of Defense
- Ralph Nader, prospective Attorney General (on-screen cameo)
- Robert Redford, prospective Secretary of the Interior
- Jim Hightower, prospective Secretary of Agriculture
- Studs Terkel, prospective Secretary of Labor (on-screen cameo)
- Gloria Steinem, prospective Secretary of Health and Human Services (on-screen cameo)
- Joan Claybrook, prospective Secretary of Transportation
- Nicholas von Hoffman, prospective Chairman of the Federal Reserve
- Barbara Jordan, prospective Ambassador to the United Nations
- Art Buchwald, prospective Ambassador to France (on-screen cameo)

== Episodes ==
No.	Title	Original release date	Prod. code
1	"The Dark Horse"	February 12, 1988	1A/1B
On the weekend before the New Hampshire primary, Congressman Jack Tanner and his daughter visit with potential voters, and meet potential rivals, while his first campaign commercial is evaluated by a focus group.
2	"For Real"	March 14, 1988	2A
Tanner's passionate "For Real" commercial generates new interest in his campaign as he heads for Nashville, and Spinelli is given an enhanced role in the campaign. In Nashville, an apparent attempt on Tanner's life produces publicity and qualifies him for Secret Service protection.
3	"The Night of the Twinkies"	April 12, 1988	2B
Tanner receives some advice on political strategy from Waylon Jennings, and then renews the acquaintance of Baptist minister Billy Cryer, an old friend and colleague from civil rights protests, whom he had not seen for twenty years. Cryer seems however more likely to endorse the campaign of Jesse Jackson. Meanwhile T.J. enjoys a fling with a musician.
4	"Moonwalker and Bookbag"	May 2, 1988	3A
After media manager Stringer places Tanner in the position of offending his friend Cryer, by appearing to force him into an endorsement of Tanner with an attempt at an impromptu press conference on the steps of a church at Fisk University, the campaign begins to freeze out Stringer. At the same time, Tanner and his daughter must learn to cope with the constant protective presence of Secret Service agents and journalist Hays Taggerty interviews Tanner's father, General Tanner, exposing an unusual family dynamic. Meanwhile Tanner, encouraged by Alexandra to participate in a protest against apartheid in South Africa, is surprised by the turn the protest takes as he is briefly arrested.
5	"Bagels with Bruce"	May 16, 1988	3B
Tanner meets with fellow candidate Bruce Babbitt, who recently ended his campaign. Tired of being on the outs with the campaign, Stringer considers joining the Dukakis campaign where he discovers Tanner's girlfriend Joanna is a staff member.
6	"Child's Play"	June 6, 1988	4A
Tanner attends campaign events ranging from appearances at day care centers--where he talks to young children about tax abatements and Ronald Reagan's anticommunism--and a Hollywood pool party, where he commits a faux pas, failing to recognise Rebecca De Mornay, to Spinelli's frustration. Afterward, a recently dismissed member of the Dukakis campaign approaches Tanner for a job, exposing Tanner's television and speech weaknesses. Meanwhile Taggerty probes T.J. for more details on Tanner's family.
7	"The Great Escape"	June 20, 1988	4B
Tanner attends a debate with Dukakis and Jesse Jackson where he attacks Jackson and his comments about drugs become news. Mechanical troubles on the campaign plane lead to a stressful flight for everyone, during which Berkoff embarrassingly confesses his feelings to a fraught Alexandra. Later, a reporter breaks the story on Tanner and Joanna's relationship, angering T.J., who did not know about it.
8	"The Girlfriend Factor"	July 11, 1988	5A
The campaign runs into problem after problem when they head to Detroit, including Tanner looking bad when "confronted" by a robot and looking bad kissing babies on camera. T.J. blames Spinelli for the robot incident. Meanwhile, David Seidelman, the reporter who broke the Tanner/Joanna story, finds himself in the campaign's doghouse. Later, Tanner spends an afternoon at a Detroit community meeting speaking to people about drugs and America's future.
9	"Something Borrowed, Something New"	July 17, 1988	5B
Alex plans Jack and Joanna's (eventually postponed) wedding, stressing over the minutest of details, only to have them call it off after General Tanner makes an inappropriate speech and Deke Conners swoops over the proceedings in a helicopter. Afterward, despite his being nearly out of the race, the campaign reads an article speculating on Tanner's would-be cabinet appointments.
10	"The Boiler Room"	August 11, 1988	6A
Having both lost at the Democratic National Convention, the Jackson and Tanner campaigns try some last minute trickery, with T.J. calling in coordinator Billy Ridenour (Harry Anderson) to work some "backroom magic". Unfortunately, the Jackson campaign's need for plausible deniability prevents Ridenour from speaking directly to Jackson and winds up costing Tanner.
11	"The Reality Check"	August 22, 1988	6B
Despite not winning the Democratic nomination and his former campaign's finances now being audited, rumblings of Tanner running as third party circulate through what is left of the campaign, gaining surprising support from General Tanner. T.J. investigates the possibilities, while Joanna meets with Kitty Dukakis, and the series ends with Jack not answering Joanna's query that it would be obvious for him to endorse Michael Dukakis and instead ruminates on his possibilities.

== Home media ==
DVD name	Release date	Region	Discs	Episodes	Bonus Features
Complete Series; Criterion Collection	October 5, 2004	1	2	11	2004 Sundance channel introductions; Essays by film critic Michael Wilmington and culture critic Gary Kornblau; A "video conversation" between Robert Altman and Garry Trudeau.

The miniseries was produced and first broadcast on HBO, scheduled irregularly over the real-life seven-month campaigning period from February through August 1988.

In 2004, the Sundance Channel rebroadcast the series, adding new one- to two-minute preludes created by Trudeau and Altman to each episode "in which the actors reflect, in character, on the '88 campaign from the perspective of the present day". That October, Sundance produced a four episode sequel, Tanner on Tanner. In 2020, Tanner '88 was added to HBO Max. As of 2025, the series is also available for streaming through the Criterion Channel.

== Production ==
The hybrid of fiction and reality that came to be the miniseries' trademark was initially accidental. Trudeau described the concept behind the miniseries as wanting to "let the audience feel they're eavesdropping, to create a sense of authenticity by observing the process, to follow campaign culture in all its tribal rites—not to make a topical movie about 1988." Tanner evolved during production, becoming, as Altman put it, "two-thirds scripted and one-third found art". Trudeau and Altman intended to make more episodes, but HBO did not extend the run of the series.

== Reception and influence ==
Reviews for the miniseries seem to improve over time. In one of the earliest reviews of the pilot episode, The New York Times called the show an "interesting misfire" that "insists too much on its own sophistication about politics". The same paper held the second episode in higher esteem, calling it "humorous cinéma vérité" that's "slick and occasionally witty". In its "Best of 1988" look at television, Time magazine called it: "the year's definitive satire of media politics".

In a 2003 review of K Street, the New York Daily News said "Tanner skewer[s] brilliantly the insanity and inanity of presidential politics". By 2004, Slate was saying:

More than a decade before the ascendancy of reality television, the series slyly blended fiction and documentary, with real-life political and media figures—Bob Dole, Bruce Babbitt, and Linda Ellerbee among them—crossing paths with, and commenting upon, Tanner's grass-roots campaign. But Tanner's formal complexity—a loose, layered blend of group improvisation, scripted set pieces, and the intervention of pure chance—manages to point up not only the laziness of reality shows like Survivor and The Bachelor but their moral and political vacuity.

While the two shows are stylistically very different, Aaron Sorkin has acknowledged that Tanner had an influence on The West Wing, which he created over a decade later, in its underlying idealism and in its view of political staffers as people who at least struggle to do the right thing.

In 2004, Altman said "I think it's the most creative work I've ever done."

In 2019, Murphy appeared as Jack Tanner in the documentary, Rolling Thunder Revue: A Bob Dylan Story by Martin Scorsese.

== Awards ==
Altman won a Primetime Emmy Award for Outstanding Directing in a Drama Series for the episode "The Boiler Room". Reed won an ACE Award for Best Actress in a Dramatic Series.
