= In the Cut (film) =

2003 film by Jane Campion

- Theatrical poster
- Directed by: Jane Campion
- Screenplay by: Jane Campion; Susanna Moore
- Based on: In the Cut by Susanna Moore
- Produced by: Nicole Kidman; Laurie Parker
- Starring: Meg Ryan; Mark Ruffalo; Jennifer Jason Leigh; Nick Damici; Sharrieff Pugh
- Cinematography: Dion Beebe
- Edited by: Alexandre de Franceschi
- Music by: Hilmar Örn Hilmarsson
- Production company: Pathé Productions Ltd
- Distributed by: Screen Gems (through Sony Pictures Releasing; United States); Pathé Distribution (United Kingdom)
- Release dates: October 22, 2003 (limited); October 31, 2003 (wide)
- Running time: 119 minutes
- Countries: United States; United Kingdom
- Language: English
- Budget: $12 million
- Box office: $23.7 million

In the Cut is a 2003 psychological thriller film written and directed by Jane Campion and starring Meg Ryan, Mark Ruffalo, Jennifer Jason Leigh and Kevin Bacon. Campion's screenplay is an adaptation of the 1995 novel of the same name by Susanna Moore. The film focuses on an English teacher who becomes personally entangled with a detective investigating a series of gruesome murders in her Manhattan neighborhood.

The film received a limited release on October 22, 2003, in the United States, and was subsequently given a wide release on Halloween that year in the United States and United Kingdom. The film received mixed reviews from critics upon release. Negative reviews were critical of the story and narrative structure, while positive reviews praised the acting and Campion's visuals.

In recent years, the film has undergone a reappraisal for its subversion of the male gaze and other common movie tropes.

== Plot ==
Frannie Avery, an introverted writer and English professor in New York City, meets her student Cornelius at a local pub to talk about coursework. He proposes a theory that John Wayne Gacy may not have been guilty of his crimes, later suggesting that 'desire' was responsible. On her way to the basement bathroom, Frannie witnesses a woman performing oral sex on a man. Although it is dark, she can see a 3 of spades tattoo on the man's wrist and the woman's blue fingernails.

Periodically, Frannie reads poems on subway posters that seem to have bearing on her own life.

Several days later, Detective Giovanni Malloy questions Frannie as he investigates the gruesome murder of a young woman whose severed limb was found in Frannie's garden. Frannie is alternately thrilled and frightened by the detective's sexual aggressiveness, even as she grows disillusioned with the sexist attitudes and crude behavior of other men. His partner Richard Rodriguez, an officer who can no longer carry a gun because he threatened to kill his wife, is one of them.

Frannie questions Malloy about his 3 of spades tattoo, which he says identifies him as a member of a secret club. While walking home from a bar, she is assaulted by a masked stranger. She phones Malloy, and they have passionate sex. Later, she realizes a charm is missing from her bracelet.

The next day, Frannie describes the sexual encounter to her free-spirited half-sister, Pauline, who lives above a strip club. After Malloy tells Frannie that she and the murder victim were in the same bar the night of the murder, she remembers the tattoo and begins to fear he may be the killer.

Another victim is found dismembered in a washing machine at a school laundry. Malloy takes Frannie away from the noisy police station and drives to a secluded spot along a river, where he teaches her to use a gun. Meanwhile, Cornelius has been taken in for police questioning on suspicion of the murders because his term paper on John Wayne Gacy is "written in blood".

Frannie is confronted by her former boyfriend John Graham, who has been stalking her. He tells her he has been having panic attacks and that he wishes to ask Pauline out on a date. She walks out on him. She goes to Pauline's apartment, where she has been staying, finding it unlocked and in disarray. In the bathroom, she finds Pauline's severed head in a plastic bag.

After being questioned by Malloy, Frannie gets drunk in her apartment. Cornelius arrives and attempts to rape her, but is interrupted by Detective Rodriguez. Later, Malloy reveals that the killer's 'signature' is leaving a ring on the finger of his victims, and also that he has a key to Pauline's apartment. Frannie is upset and asks if he is the killer. Malloy is angry and sends her home.

Later, Frannie lets Malloy into her apartment and they have sex with him handcuffed to a pipe. Looking for the key in his jacket, she discovers her missing charm and believes this is more evidence that he is the serial killer. She takes his jacket and gun, leaving him handcuffed, and is met by Rodriguez outside.

Rodriguez persuades Frannie to get into his unmarked car and drives her "to the lighthouse", which reminds her of a book she teaches (To the Lighthouse). Their destination is the Little Red Lighthouse below the George Washington Bridge. Rodriguez becomes threatening and she realises he has the same tattoo as Malloy. Rodriguez presents a ring on the end of a knife and asks Frannie to marry him.

Realizing that Rodriguez is the killer, Frannie shoots him with Malloy's gun. He attempts to strangle her, but she fires the gun again, killing him. Bloodied, she walks back to her apartment and lies down with Malloy, who is still cuffed to the pipe where she left him.

== Cast ==
- Meg Ryan as Frannie Avery
- Mark Ruffalo as Detective Giovanni A. Malloy
- Jennifer Jason Leigh as Pauline Avery
- Kevin Bacon as John Graham
- Nick Damici as Detective Richard Rodriguez
- Patrice O'Neal as Hector
- Sharrieff Pugh as Cornelius Webb
- Heather Litteer as Angela Sands

== Production ==
Laurie Parker and Jane Campion spent five years developing the film. Nicole Kidman got a producer credit because she was originally cast as Frannie, but dropped out because she was getting a divorce and needed more time with her children. This film was executive produced by Effie T. Brown, in association with Sony Screen Gems and Pathé International.

== Box office ==
In the Cut grossed $1,666,830 at the box office in Australia.

The total worldwide gross of In the Cut was $23,726,793.

== Reception ==
Contemporary

On Rotten Tomatoes, the film has a score of 35% based on reviews from 179 critics and an average rating of 4.9/10; the consensus reads: "Jane Campion takes a stab at subverting the psycho-sexual thriller genre with In the Cut, but gets tangled in her own abstraction." On Metacritic the film has a score of 46 out of 100 based on reviews from 38 critics, indicating "mixed or average" reviews. CinemaScore gave it a rating of "F" based on surveys from general audiences.

Todd McCarthy of Variety wrote: "Beautifully crafted and highlighted by an arresting change-of-pace [performance] by Meg Ryan as an English teacher erotically awakened by a homicide detective. But the story's unpalatable narrative holes and dramatic missteps will hold sway over the pic's better qualities." Noel Murray of The A.V. Club wrote: "Though the oppressive artiness makes the early scenes fairly ridiculous, the director's odd methods add rare tension to the climax, as it becomes evident that the finale won't be so predictable in Campion's hands."

In a positive review for the Los Angeles Times, Manohla Dargis wrote "the film is filled with surreal, hothouse flourishes that tell the story as vividly and often more eloquently than either the plot mechanics or dialogue", adding that it "may be the most maddening and imperfect great movie of the year". Mick LaSalle of the San Francisco Chronicle said although In the Cut "falls short of the masterpiece Campion intended, it's unquestionably the most ambitious and important film to come along in months".

Ann Hornaday of The Washington Post wrote that although the film was flawed as a thriller,

it's not such a write-off as a psychosexual portrait of a certain kind of single Manhattan woman at the turn of the new century. With its restless, jittery camera, the movie captures the jangly paranoia of a city that is often equally tantalizing and threatening; Frannie responds in kind, with her own contradictory sexual persona, which at certain times is defiantly autonomous and at others almost timidly girlish. A Looking for Mr. Goodbar for the post-9/11 age (the remnants of that tragedy form one of the movie's many visual leitmotifs), In the Cut focuses on the darker face of the classic New York romance. It's a face that's grimly credible, if seldom seen. Within an otherwise flawed, forgettable movie, Campion has managed to offer a vivid, if fleeting, glimpse of the wariness, self-deception and fear that shadow so many illicit thrills of sex in the city.

Hornaday also singled out Ruffalo's performance, writing the actor is "unsettlingly convincing as a man whose sexual magnetism lies not in leading-man good looks but in his ability to portray himself as both a protector and, if the situation warrants, a predator".

In the Cut was among the films discussed favorably by Slavoj Žižek in The Pervert's Guide to Cinema (2006).

Retrospective

In the years since In the Cut's original release, the film has been reexamined and praised as a feminist erotic thriller. Critics noted how Campion emphasizes female agency and pleasure, and subverts many tropes of the genre such as the femme fatale archetype and the male gaze. Writing for Thrillist, Jourdain Searles said the film is

a story about women being hunted, from their vantage point for once. Shots depicting Frannie being watched mainly serve to highlight how women have to navigate the world under the gaze of men. Frannie is always looking over her shoulder, constantly assessing her surroundings. She knows she is being watched, yet continues to pursue pleasure on her own terms. In the end, once Frannie has faced her worst fears, In the Cut rewards that bravery.

In the Cut has also been interpreted as a deconstruction of fantasies of romance, particularly the idealization of marriage. Writing for Fangoria, Zach Vasquez said the film succeeds at both combining "the lurid aesthetic of Bava/Argento with a modern examination of violent patriarchal power dynamics", citing Campion's "use of speed ramping, slow motion, lens flares, and more". Nick James placed In the Cut at No. 3 in Sight & Sound's list of twenty-first century noir films, writing "it's the way that Campion, in scene after scene, juxtaposes powerful female desire with vulnerability that makes In the Cut a unique noir". Film critic David Thomson has also called the film a masterpiece, and, in his book Moments That Made the Movies, hails it as "one of the great films of the twenty-first century."
