= Tom Johnson (journalist) =

American journalist and media executive (born 1941)

- Johnson in 2016
- Born: Wyatt Thomas Johnson; September 30, 1941 (age 85); Macon, Georgia, U.S.
- Education: University of Georgia; Harvard University
- Occupations: Journalist; media executive

Wyatt Thomas Johnson (born September 30, 1941) is an American journalist and media executive, best known for serving as president of Cable News Network (CNN) during the 1990s and, before that, as publisher of the Los Angeles Times newspaper.

From 1976 to 1980, Johnson was a member of the Peabody Awards Board of Jurors. In addition, Johnson is a long-time member of the Lyndon Baines Johnson Foundation board of trustees and a former member of the Rockefeller Foundation board of trustees.

== Early life ==
Johnson was born on September 30, 1941, in Macon, Georgia and graduated from Lanier High School. While in high school, he began working at the Macon Telegraph newspaper. He went on to earn a bachelor's degree from the University of Georgia's Henry W. Grady College of Journalism and Mass Communication and a master's from Harvard Business School, both of which were largely financed by his employers at the Telegraph.

== Career ==
=== LBJ ===
President Lyndon B. Johnson (no relation) tapped Johnson as a White House Fellow, but he accepted only after being encouraged by the Telegraph's publisher and assured he had no further obligation to the paper.

On the evening of April 4, 1968, it was Tom Johnson who walked into the Oval Office to hand President Johnson the news that Martin Luther King Jr. had been shot (it would be another hour before doctors in Memphis, Tennessee declared King dead). In the Oval Office with President Johnson at the time were former Georgia Governor Carl Sanders and former Coca-Cola CEO (and still a Board Member) Robert W. Woodruff. Tom Johnson shared that President Johnson signed the note and gave it to Governor Sanders. Johnson has said that one of his remaining goals in life is to obtain that signed news note from the Sanders estate and give it to the Lyndon Baines Johnson Library and Museum.

He worked in various positions in the Johnson administration and continued to work for the former President after he retired to Texas. As "Thinking Big" by Robert Gottlieb and Irene Wolf noted in 1977, "when Lyndon Johnson returned to Texas in 1969, he brought Tom Johnson along to serve as executive assistant in charge of LBJ's Texas Broadcasting Company."

The same book also revealed that in 1970 the then-30-year-old Tom Johnson was elected executive vice-president of LBJ's Texas Broadcasting Company and "he joined the board of directors of the City National Bank of Austin, headed up LBJ's Austin station KTBC, and participated in the town's business-dominated civic groups."

The Austin TV station which Tom Johnson headed in the 1970s was profitable because LBJ "had friends in high places among those who controlled the broadcast industry," according to a 1978 book by another former LBJ aide, Bobby Baker, titled "Wheeling And Dealing: Confessions of a Capitol Hill Operator". The same book also revealed that "it is no accident that Austin, TX, was for years the only city of its size with only one television station" and "LBJ demanded, and received, the opportunity to pick and choose programs for his monopoly station from among those offered by all three of the major networks." "Wheeling And Dealing" also points out that "no other television station in America had such a unique and cozy arrangement" as the LBJ-owned KTBC station which Tom Johnson used to head for LBJ.

Eight and a half minutes into the January 22, 1973 broadcast of the CBS Evening News, Tom Johnson placed a direct call to Walter Cronkite to inform him of the death of Lyndon Johnson. CBS cut away from a pre-recorded report on the progressing Vietnam peace talks in Paris back to the CBS newsroom where Cronkite was on the phone receiving the information from Tom Johnson. A moment later, Cronkite asked Johnson to stay on the line, then he reported the death of the former U.S. president to the television audience.

=== Los Angeles Times ===
After Lyndon Johnson's death, Tom Johnson again moved into journalism, eventually becoming publisher of the Dallas Times Herald in 1975. From there, he moved on to the Los Angeles Times, where he served as president and later publisher during a thirteen-year stint.

=== CNN ===
In 1990, Johnson moved from print to television, as CNN founder Ted Turner asked him to serve as the third president of the news channel. Johnson succeeded outgoing CNN president, Burt Reinhardt. Johnson's first year saw the outbreak of the Persian Gulf War, an event that helped place CNN firmly in the public consciousness. He ran CNN until his retirement in 2001, presiding over both triumphant and controversial moments in the history of the network. Walter Isaacson succeeded Johnson as the president of CNN in July 2001.

Johnson was present in the room when Mikhail Gorbachev signed his resignation letter on 25 December 1991, thereby dissolving the USSR. Gorbachev's pen failed, and Johnson lent him his. After signing, Gorbachev was about to put the pen in his pocket, but Johnson, realizing the historic significance, quickly asked to have his pen back.

Johnson later publicly revealed a long battle with depression that he was able to control with medication. Johnson had previously kept the condition private, though he told Turner when he was offered the CNN position.

== Portrayals ==
Johnson was portrayed by actor Michael Murphy in the 2002 Primetime Emmy Award-winning HBO made-for-television movie Live from Baghdad.

== Accolades ==
- 1995: Golden Plate Award, American Academy of Achievement
- 1999: Paul White Award, Radio Television Digital News Association
- 1999: Walter Cronkite Award for Excellence in Journalism.

== Books ==
- Johnson, Tom (October 1, 2025). Driven: A Life in Public Service and Journalism from LBJ to CNN (First hardcover ed.). Athens, Ga.: The University of Georgia Press. ISBN 9780820374536. OCLC 1511538802.
