= Dead Boys (disambiguation) =

Dead Boys are an American punk rock band.

Dead Boys may also refer to:

- Dead Boys (EP), a 2018 EP by Sam Fender, or the title track
- Dead Boys (novel), a 1994 science fiction novel by Richard Calder
