= In the Cut (novel) =

1995 novel by Susanna Moore

- First edition artwork
- Author: Susanna Moore
- Language: English
- Publisher: Knopf
- Publication date: October 17, 1995
- Publication place: United States
- Pages: 179 (first edition)
- ISBN: 978-0679-42258-7

In the Cut is a 1995 thriller novel by American writer Susanna Moore. The plot follows an English professor at New York University who becomes entangled in a sexual relationship with a detective investigating a series of gruesome murders in her neighborhood. The novel was adapted into a feature film of the same name in 2003 by director Jane Campion.

== Plot ==
Frannie Avery is an English professor living near Washington Square Park in lower Manhattan. She is studying street vernacular for an upcoming book she is working on. While meeting with one of her students, Cornelius, at a bar, she goes downstairs to use the bathroom, and stumbles upon a man receiving oral sex from a woman. She notes two minor details: A spade tattoo on the man's wrist, and the woman's painted fingernails, but most of the scene is obscured in shadow.

Several days later, Frannie is contacted by a police detective, Giovanni Malloy, about the murder of a woman who was last seen at the bar on the same day Frannie was there. Frannie infers that the victim must be the woman she saw in the basement. Frannie and Malloy are flirtatious from the outset, and, over drinks, he expresses his willingness to "do anything but hit her". While walking home alone after their date, Frannie is assaulted by a man on the street, but he flees before she can see him. After, she and Malloy have a passionate sexual encounter at her apartment, but Frannie is suspicious of him when she realizes he has a matching spade tattoo on his wrist. Frannie confides in her half-sister, Pauline, with whom she has a close relationship.

Frannie's romantic and sexual interest in the hard-edged Malloy further deepens, though she is not as welcoming toward his partner, Detective Rodriguez, a man she learns has abused his wife; this reminds her of the dysfunctional relationship her parents had, which was marked by abuse from her father. As she observes the two men together, she finds herself alternately repulsed by their crude behavior, but nonetheless becomes enamored of Malloy. After additional murders occur in Frannie's neighborhood—exclusively decapitations and dismemberments (which Malloy refers to as 'disarticulations') of young women—she grows fascinated by Malloy's investigation.

Later, when Frannie goes to visit Pauline at her apartment, she finds her dismembered corpse, which causes her to go into a stupor. Frannie becomes convinced that Malloy is in fact responsible for the murders. After one final sexual encounter with Malloy, Frannie flees her apartment, and is consoled by Rodriguez, who takes her for a drive. The two go to the Little Red Lighthouse beneath the George Washington Bridge, a place he says he enjoys fishing. There, Frannie realizes that Rodriguez too has a matching spade tattoo—she realizes he is actually the killer, there to claim her as his next victim. She attempts to fight him, but he overpowers her and slashes her with a scalpel. While Frannie lies injured on the ground, Rodriguez explains that he sometimes uses the flesh of his victims as chum when he goes fishing. As Frannie bleeds to death, she recalls an Indian poem she saw earlier on the subway.

== Critical response ==
Publishers Weekly wrote: "Several stunning shocks await Moore's longtime readers in her fourth novel... The question is: will readers be disturbed--and perhaps repelled by--explicit descriptions of sexual acts, scatological language and gruesome violence?" Ken Tucker of Entertainment Weekly was highly critical, describing the novel as one "of breathtaking condescension and snobbism trying to pass itself off as an ironic serial-killer thriller."

Joy Press of The Baltimore Sun gave a mixed review, noting it as "a stark, stylish, and graphic erotic thriller - quite a departure for Susanna Moore, whose previous books Sleeping Beauties and The Whiteness of Bones, were far more quietly literary affairs set in Hawaii," but ultimately felt that "while beautifully written, [it] relies too heavily on sex for its shock value. Moore reveals too little of her characters, and so fails to engage the reader fully. This is an ambitious, lurid novel, most definitely not for the faint of heart." The New York Times's Michiko Kakutani criticized Moore for "sensationalizing.. with highly graphic descriptions of violence and sex, as if she were trying to translate the work of Joe Eszterhas and Paul Verhoeven to the page," but conceded: "What saves In the Cut from becoming a run-of-the-mill hothouse thriller -- and what ultimately keeps the reader reading -- is Ms. Moore's strong, tactile prose."
