= Live from Baghdad =

1992 book by Robert Wiener

Live from Baghdad is a non-fiction book published in 1992 by CNN producer Robert Wiener about his experiences before the Persian Gulf War, which lasted from August 1990 to February 1991.

It was filmed by Home Box Office (HBO) in 2002 under the same title.

== First edition ==
- Doubleday (1992) ISBN 0-385-42165-6
