= List of American films of 1989 =

This is a list of American films released in 1989.

== Box office ==
The highest-grossing American films released in 1989, by domestic box office gross revenue, are as follows:

Highest-grossing films of 1989
Rank	Title	Distributor	Domestic gross
1	Batman	Warner Bros.	$251,188,924
2	Indiana Jones and the Last Crusade	Paramount	$197,171,806
3	Lethal Weapon 2	Warner Bros.	$147,253,986
4	Look Who's Talking	TriStar	$140,088,813
5	Honey, I Shrunk the Kids	Walt Disney Studios Motion Pictures	$130,724,172
6	Back to the Future Part II	Universal	$118,450,002
7	Ghostbusters II	Columbia	$112,494,738
8	Driving Miss Daisy	Warner Bros.	$106,593,296
9	Parenthood	Universal	$100,047,830
10	Dead Poets Society	Walt Disney Studios Motion Pictures	$95,860,116

== January–March ==
Opening		Title	Production company	Cast and crew	Ref.
J A N U A R Y	13	Cameron's Closet	SVS Films / Smart Egg Pictures	Armand Mastroianni (director); Gary Brandner (screenplay); Cotter Smith, Mel Harris, Scott Curtis, Tab Hunter, Kim Lankford, Leigh McCloskey, Chuck McCann, Gary Hudson, William Lustig, Frank Pesce	
J A N U A R Y	13	DeepStar Six	Tri-Star Pictures / Carolco Pictures	Sean S. Cunningham (director); Lewis Abernathy, Geof Miller (screenplay); Taurean Blacque, Nancy Everhard, Greg Evigan, Miguel Ferrer, Matt McCoy, Nia Peeples, Cindy Pickett, Marius Weyers, Elya Baskin, Thom Bray, Ronn Carroll	
J A N U A R Y	13	The Experts	Paramount Pictures	Dave Thomas (director); Nick Thiel, Steven Greene, Eric Alter (screenplay); John Travolta, Arye Gross, Kelly Preston, Deborah Foreman, James Keach, Jan Rubeš, Brian Doyle-Murray, Charles Martin Smith, Mimi Maynard, Eve Brent, Rick Ducommun, Steve Levitt, Tony Edwards	
J A N U A R Y	13	Gleaming the Cube	20th Century Fox / Gladden Entertainment	Graeme Clifford (director); Michael Tolkin (screenplay); Christian Slater, Steven Bauer, Richard Herd, Le Tuan, Min Luong, Art Chudabala, Ed Lauter, Micole Mercurio, Peter Kwong, Max Perlich, Tony Hawk, Christian Jacobs, Buddy Joe Hooker	
J A N U A R Y	13	The January Man	Metro-Goldwyn-Mayer / United Artists	Pat O'Connor (director); John Patrick Shanley (screenplay); Kevin Kline, Susan Sarandon, Mary Elizabeth Mastrantonio, Harvey Keitel, Danny Aiello, Rod Steiger, Alan Rickman, Faye Grant	
J A N U A R Y	27	Cohen and Tate	Hemdale Film Corporation / Nelson Entertainment	Eric Red (director/screenplay); Roy Scheider, Adam Baldwin, Harley Cross, Cooper Huckabee, Suzanne Savoy, Marco Perella, Tom Campitelli, Andy Gill, Frank Bates	
J A N U A R Y	27	Parents	Vestron Pictures	Bob Balaban (director); Christopher Hawthorne (screenplay); Randy Quaid, Mary Beth Hurt, Sandy Dennis, Bryan Madorsky, Juno Mills-Cockell, Kathryn Grody, Deborah Rush, Graham Jarvis, Wayne Robson, Helen Carscallen, Warren Van Evera	
J A N U A R Y	27	Physical Evidence	Columbia Pictures	Michael Crichton (director); Bill Phillips, Steve Ransohoff (screenplay); Burt Reynolds, Theresa Russell, Ned Beatty, Kay Lenz, Ted McGinley, Tom O'Brien, Kenneth Welsh	
J A N U A R Y	27	Three Fugitives	Touchstone Pictures	Francis Veber (director/screenplay); Nick Nolte, Martin Short, James Earl Jones, Alan Ruck, Sarah Doroff, Kenneth McMillan, David Arnott, Lee Garlington, Bruce McGill, Sy Richardson, Rocky Giordani, Stanley Brock, Rick Hall, Brian Thompson, Jack McGee, Kathy Kinney, Larry Miller, Jeff Perry, Dinah Lenney, John Aylward, Tim De Zarn, Rhoda Gemignani, Charles Noland, Albert Henderson, Gary Armagnac, Dean Smith, Mike MacDonald	
F E B R U A R Y	3	Her Alibi	Warner Bros. Pictures	Bruce Beresford (director); Charlie Peters (screenplay); Tom Selleck, Paulina Porizkova, William Daniels, James Farentino, Hurd Hatfield, Victor Argo, Patrick Wayne, Tess Harper	
F E B R U A R Y	3	Kinjite: Forbidden Subjects	Cannon Films	J. Lee Thompson (director); Harold Nebenzal (screenplay); Charles Bronson, Perry Lopez, James Pax, Peggy Lipton, Sy Richardson, Juan Fernández de Alarcon, Bill McKinney, Nicole Eggert, Amy Hathaway, Sam Chew Jr., Danny Trejo	
F E B R U A R Y	3	Who's Harry Crumb?	Tri-Star Pictures	Paul Flaherty (director); Robert Conte, Peter Martin Wortmann (screenplay); John Candy, Jeffrey Jones, Annie Potts, Tim Thomerson, Barry Corbin, Shawnee Smith, Valri Bromfield, Renée Coleman, Wesley Mann, Joe Flaherty, Beverley Elliott, Garwin Sanford, Tony Dakota, Manny Perry, Tino Insana, Deanna Oliver, Jim Belushi, Doug Steckler, Tamsin Kelsey, Lori O'Byrne, Michele Goodger, P. Lynn Johnson, Peter Yunker	
F E B R U A R Y	3	Wicked Stepmother	Metro-Goldwyn-Mayer	Larry Cohen (director/screenplay); Bette Davis, Barbara Carrera, Lionel Stander, Colleen Camp, David Rasche, Shawn Donohue, Tom Bosley, Richard Moll, Evelyn Keyes, James Dixon, Seymour Cassel, Susie Garrett, Laurene Landon, Bob Goen, Maxine Elliott Hicks, Helen Shaw, Laurie Main, Robert Dowdell	
F E B R U A R Y	10	Cousins	Paramount Pictures	Joel Schumacher (director); Jean-Charles Tacchella, Stephen Metcalfe (screenplay); Ted Danson, Isabella Rossellini, Sean Young, William Petersen, Norma Aleandro, Lloyd Bridges, Keith Coogan, Gina DeAngeles, George Coe, Katharine Isabelle, Patrick McGeachan	
F E B R U A R Y	10	The Fly II	20th Century Fox	Chris Walas (director); Mick Garris, Jim Wheat, Ken Wheat, Frank Darabont (screenplay); Eric Stoltz, Daphne Zuniga, Lee Richardson, Harley Cross, John Getz, Frank C. Turner, Garry Chalk, Ann Marie Lee, Saffron Henderson, Jerry Wasserman, Duncan Fraser, Bruce Harwood, Lorena Gale, Bill Dow, Garwin Sanford, Andrea Mann, Jeff Goldblum	
F E B R U A R Y	10	Tap	Tri-Star Pictures	Nick Castle (director/screenplay); Gregory Hines, Suzzanne Douglas, Joe Morton, Sammy Davis Jr., Savion Glover, Terrence E. McNally, Dick Anthony Williams, Arthur Duncan, Bunny Briggs, Howard "Sandman" Sims, Steve Condos, Harold Nicholas, Jimmy Slyde, Barbara Perry, Tim Cappello, Etta James	
F E B R U A R Y	15	Lawrence of Arabia (re-release)	Columbia Pictures / Horizon Pictures	David Lean (director); Robert Bolt, Michael Wilson (screenplay); Peter O'Toole, Alec Guinness, Anthony Quinn, Jack Hawkins, Omar Sharif, José Ferrer, Anthony Quayle, Claude Rains, Arthur Kennedy, Donald Wolfit, I. S. Johar, Gamil Ratib, Michel Ray, John Dimech, Zia Mohyeddin, Howard Marion-Crawford, Jack Gwillim, Hugh Miller, Peter Burton, Kenneth Fortescue, Harry Fowler, Jack Hedley, Ian MacNaughton, Henry Oscar, Norman Rossington, John Ruddock, Fernando Sancho, Stuart Saunders	
F E B R U A R Y	17	Bill & Ted's Excellent Adventure	Orion Pictures / Nelson Entertainment / Embassy Pictures / Interscope Communications	Stephen Herek (director); Chris Matheson, Ed Solomon (screenplay); Keanu Reeves, Alex Winter, George Carlin, Terry Camilleri, Dan Shor, Tony Steedman, Rod Loomis, Al Leong, Jane Wiedlin, Robert V. Barron, Clifford David, Hal Landon Jr., Bernie Casey, Amy Stock-Poynton, J. Patrick McNamara, Frazier Bain, John Karlsen, Diane Franklin, Kimberley LaBelle, Clarence Clemons, Martha Davis, Fee Waybill	
F E B R U A R Y	17	The 'Burbs	Universal Pictures / Imagine Entertainment	Joe Dante (director); Dana Olsen (screenplay); Tom Hanks, Bruce Dern, Carrie Fisher, Rick Ducommun, Corey Feldman, Wendy Schaal, Henry Gibson, Brother Theodore, Courtney Gains, Gale Gordon, Dick Miller, Robert Picardo, Cory Danziger, Franklyn Ajaye, Rance Howard, Nicky Katt, Carey Scott, Kevin Gage, Dana Olsen, Patrika Darbo	
F E B R U A R Y	17	The Mighty Quinn	Metro-Goldwyn-Mayer	Carl Schenkel (director); Hampton Fancher (screenplay); Denzel Washington, James Fox, Mimi Rogers, M. Emmet Walsh, Sheryl Lee Ralph, Robert Townsend, Esther Rolle, Art Evans, Henry Judd Baker, Norman Beaton, Alex Colon, Tyra Ferrell, Keye Luke, Carl Bradshaw, Oliver Samuels	
F E B R U A R Y	17	True Believer	Columbia Pictures	Joseph Ruben (director); Wesley Strick (screenplay); James Woods, Robert Downey Jr., Yuji Okumoto, Margaret Colin, Kurtwood Smith, Tom Bower, Charles Hallahan, Miguel Fernandes, Sully Diaz, Luis Guzman, Joel Polis, Kurt Fuller, Graham Beckel, John Snyder	
F E B R U A R Y	24	American Ninja 3: Blood Hunt	Cannon Films	Cedric Sundstrom (director); Gary Conway (screenplay); David Bradley, Steve James, Michele Chan, Calvin Jung, Marjoe Gortner	
F E B R U A R Y	24	Bert Rigby, You're a Fool	Warner Bros. Pictures / Lorimar Film Entertainment	Carl Reiner (director/screenplay); Robert Lindsay, Robbie Coltrane, Jackie Gayle, Bruno Kirby, Corbin Bernsen, Anne Bancroft, Cathryn Bradshaw, Carmen du Sautoy, Liz Smith, Mike Grady	
F E B R U A R Y	24	Powwow Highway	Warner Bros. Pictures / Handmade Films	Jonathan Wacks (director); David Seals, Janet Heaney, Jean Stawarz (screenplay); A Martinez, Gary Farmer, Joannelle Nadine Romero, Amanda Wyss, Roscoe Born, John Trudell, Wes Studi, Tony Frank, Rodney Grant, Graham Greene, Floyd Westerman, Sam Vlahos, Wayne Waterman, Margot Kane, Geoff Rivas, Chrissie McDonald, Sky Seals, Maria Antoinette Rogers, Dalin Gomez, Mike Means, Ariane Rowland, Chris Rowland, Keith Shoulder Blade, Titus Shoulder Blade, Adam Taylor, Del Zamora	
F E B R U A R Y	24	The Toxic Avenger Part II	Troma Entertainment	Lloyd Kaufman, Michael Herz (directors); Gay Partington Terry (screenplay); Ron Fazio, Phoebe Legere, John Altamura, Rick Collins, Rikiya Yasuoka, Tsutomu Sekine, Mayako Katsuragi	
M A R C H	3	Hit List	New Line Cinema / CineTel Films	William Lustig (director); Peter Brosnan, John F. Goff (screenplay); Jan-Michael Vincent, Leo Rossi, Lance Henriksen, Charles Napier, Rip Torn, Harold Sylvester, Jere Burns, Ken Lerner, Nick Barbaro, Margaret Gwenver, Lisa M. Hansen, Felice Orlandi, Junior Richard, Harreit Hall, Jack Andreozzi, Lou Bonacki, Barry Brener, Geoff Brewer, Richard E. Butler, Christopher Carroll, Robert A. Ferretti, John F. Goff, John Greene, Dennis Junt, Lauri Landry, Scott Lincoln, Jason Lustig, Vic Manni, Frank Pesce, Pearl Shear, John Paul Vetturini	
M A R C H	3	Dream a Little Dream	Vestron Pictures	Marc Rocco (director/screenplay); Daniel Jay Franklin, D.E. Eisenberg (screenplay); Corey Feldman, Corey Haim, Meredith Salenger, Jason Robards, Piper Laurie, Harry Dean Stanton, William McNamara, Lala, Susan Blakely, Matt Adler, Victoria Jackson, Alex Rocco, Josh Evans, Mickey Thomas, John Ford Coley	
M A R C H	3	Farewell to the King	Orion Pictures	John Milius (director/screenplay); Nick Nolte, Nigel Havers, Marius Weyers, Frank McRae, James Fox, Aki Aleong, Gerry Lopez, Richard Morgan, John Bennett Perry, Wayne Pygram	
M A R C H	3	Lean on Me	Warner Bros. Pictures	John G. Avildsen (director); Michael Schiffer (director); Morgan Freeman, Beverly Todd, Robert Guillaume, Alan North, Ethan Phillips, Lynne Thigpen, Robin Bartlett, Michael Beach, Tony Todd, Jermaine 'Huggy' Hopkins, Karen Malina White, Karina Arroyave, Michael P. Moran, Ivonne Coll, Regina Taylor, Jim Moody, Mike Starr, Michael Imperioli	
M A R C H	3	Skin Deep	20th Century Fox / Morgan Creek Productions	Blake Edwards (director/screenplay); John Ritter, Vincent Gardenia, Alyson Reed, Julianne Phillips, Chelsea Field, Joel Brooks, Peter Donat, Don Gordon, Nina Foch, Denise Crosby, Michael Kidd, Dee Dee Rescher, Bryan Genesse, Bo Foxworth, Raye Hollitt, Brenda Swanson, Jean Marie McKee	
M A R C H	10	The Adventures of Baron Munchausen	Columbia Pictures / Allied Filmmakers	Terry Gilliam (director/screenplay); Charles McKeown (screenplay); John Neville, Eric Idle, Sarah Polley, Oliver Reed, Uma Thurman, Jonathan Pryce, Bill Paterson, Charles McKeown, Winston Dennis, Jack Purvis, Valentina Cortese, Peter Jeffrey, Alison Steadman, Ray Cooper, Don Henderson, Sting, Terry Gilliam, Robin Williams	
M A R C H	10	Chances Are	Tri-Star Pictures	Emile Ardolino (director); Perry Howze, Randy Howze (screenplay); Cybill Shepherd, Robert Downey Jr., Ryan O'Neal, Mary Stuart Masterson, Christopher McDonald, Josef Sommer, Joe Grifasi, Henderson Forsythe, Fran Ryan, James Noble, Marc McClure, Susan Ruttan, Mimi Kennedy, Kathleen Freeman, Dennis Patrick, Martin Garner, Gianni Russo, Lester Lanin	
M A R C H	10	Jacknife	Cineplex Odeon Films / Kings Road Entertainment	David Jones (director); Stephen Metcalfe (screenplay); Robert De Niro, Ed Harris, Kathy Baker, Sloane Shelton, Ivar Brogger, Tom Isbell, Jordan Lund, Tom Rack, Charles S. Dutton, Bruce Ramsay, Jessalyn Gilsig, George Gerdes, Josh Pais, Loudon Wainwright III, Walter Massey, Elizabeth Franz, Kirk Taylor, Gabrielle Carteris	
M A R C H	10	New York Stories	Touchstone Pictures / Silver Screen Partners / American Zoetrope	Woody Allen, Francis Ford Coppola (directors/screenplay); Martin Scorsese (director); Sofia Coppola, Richard Price (screenplay); Woody Allen, Rosanna Arquette, Mia Farrow, Giancarlo Giannini, Julie Kavner, Nick Nolte, Talia Shire, Steve Buscemi, Jesse Borrego, Peter Gabriel, Illeana Douglas, Deborah Harry, Heather McComb, Don Novello, Adrien Brody, Chris Elliott, Carmine Coppola, Carole Bouquet, Holly Marie Combs, Mae Questel, George Schindler, Larry David, Mike Starr, Kirsten Dunst, Ira Wheeler, Paul Herman, Martin Rosenblatt, Helen Hanft, Jodi Long, Nancy Giles, Ed Koch, Gia Coppola, James Keane, Tom Mardirosian, Michael Higgins, Patrick O'Neal, Mark Boone Junior, Victor Argo, Richard Price, Brigitte Bako, Amber Barretto, Julia Campanelli, Martin Scorsese	
M A R C H	10	Police Academy 6: City Under Siege	Warner Bros. Pictures	Peter Bonerz (director); Stephen Curwick (screenplay); Bubba Smith, Michael Winslow, David Graf, Marion Ramsey, Leslie Easterbrook, Lance Kinsey, Bruce Mahler, Kenneth Mars, Matt McCoy, G. W. Bailey, George Gaynes, George R. Robertson, Gerrit Graham, Allison Mack, Arthur Batanides, Billie Bird, Greg Collins, Anna Mathias, Melle Mel, Peter Elbling, Roberta Haynes, Dean Norris, Charlie Adler, Paul Maslansky	
M A R C H	12	Dead Man Out	HBO Showcase	Richard Pearce (director); Ron Hutchinson (screenplay); Danny Glover, Rubén Blades, Larry Block, Tom Atkins, Samuel L. Jackson	
M A R C H	17	Fletch Lives	Universal Pictures	Michael Ritchie (director); Leon Capetanos (screenplay); Chevy Chase, Hal Holbrook, Julianne Phillips, R. Lee Ermey, Richard Libertini, Randall "Tex" Cobb, Don Brockett, Cleavon Little, George Wyner, Patricia Kalember, Geoffrey Lewis, Richard Belzer, Phil Hartman, Titos Vandis, Don Hood	
M A R C H	17	Leviathan	Metro-Goldwyn-Mayer / Filmauro	George P. Cosmatos (director); David Peoples, Jeb Stuart (screenplay); Peter Weller, Richard Crenna, Amanda Pays, Daniel Stern, Ernie Hudson, Michael Carmine, Lisa Eilbacher, Hector Elizondo, Meg Foster, Eugene Lipinski, Tom Woodruff Jr.	
M A R C H	17	The Rescuers (re-release)	Walt Disney Pictures	Wolfgang Reitherman, John Lounsbery, Art Stevens (directors); Larry Clemmons, Vance Gerry, Ken Anderson, Frank Thomas, Burny Mattinson, Fred Lucky, Dick Sebast, David Michener, Ted Berman (screenplay); Bob Newhart, Eva Gabor, Michelle Stacy, Geraldine Page, Joe Flynn, Jim Jordan, John McIntire, Jeanette Nolan, Pat Buttram, Bernard Fox, James McDonald, George Lindsey, Larry Clemmons, Dub Taylor, John Fiedler, Shelby Flint, Bill McMillian	
M A R C H	17	Rooftops	New Visions Pictures	Robert Wise (director); Allan A. Goldstein, Tony Mark (screenplay); Jason Gedrick, Troy Beyer, Eddie Velez, Tisha Campbell-Martin, Alexis Cruz, Allen Payne, Luis Guzmán, Robert LaSardo, Lauren Tom, Rockets Redglare, Paul Herman, Coley Wallace, Steve Love, Rafael Baez, Jaime Tirelli, Millie Tirelli, Jay Boryea, Edouard DeSoto, Bruce Smolanoff, Edythe Jason, Stuart Rudin, Herb Kerr, Peter Lopez, Kurt Lott, Jed James	
M A R C H	24	976-EVIL	New Line Cinema / CineTel Films	Robert Englund (director); Rhet Topham, Brian Helgeland (screenplay); Stephen Geoffreys, Jim Metzler, Maria Rubell, Pat O'Bryan, Sandy Dennis	
M A R C H	24	Dead Bang	Warner Bros. Pictures / Lorimar Film Entertainment	John Frankenheimer (director); Robert Foster (screenplay); Don Johnson, Penelope Ann Miller, William Forsythe, Bob Balaban, Tim Reid, Tate Donovan, Frank Military, Antoni Stutz, Mickey Jones, Ron Campbell, William Traylor, Hy Anzell, Michael Jeter, James B. Douglas, Brad Sullivan	
M A R C H	24	Troop Beverly Hills	Columbia Pictures	Jeff Kanew (director); Pamela Norris, Margaret Grieco Oberman (screenplay); Shelley Long, Craig T. Nelson, Betty Thomas, Mary Gross, Stephanie Beacham, Jenny Lewis, Emily Schulman, Carla Gugino, Kellie Martin, Aquilina Soriano, Karen Kopins, Tasha Scott, Heather Hopper, Ami Foster, Audra Lindley, Edd Byrnes, Shelley Morrison, Dinah Lacey, Tori Spelling, Willie Garson, Mary Pat Gleason, Kareem Abdul-Jabbar, Frankie Avalon, Annette Funicello, Dr. Joyce Brothers, Robin Leach, Cheech Marin, Ted McGinley, Pia Zadora, Hilary Shepard	
M A R C H	31	Heathers	New World Pictures	Michael Lehmann (director); Daniel Waters (screenplay); Winona Ryder, Christian Slater, Shannen Doherty, Lisanne Falk, Kim Walker, Penelope Milford, Glenn Shadix, Lance Fenton, Patrick Labyorteaux, Jeremy Applegate, Em Lodge, Renée Estevez, Carrie Lynn, Chuck LaFont, Phill Lewis	

== April–June ==
Opening		Title	Production company	Cast and crew	Ref.
A P R I L	7	Cyborg	Metro-Goldwyn-Mayer / Cannon Group	Albert Pyun (director); Kitty Chalmers, Daniel Hubbard-Smith (screenplay); Jean-Claude Van Damme, Deborah Richter, Vincent Klyn, Dayle Haddon, Alex Daniels, Ralf Möller, Blaise Loong, Haley Peterson, Terrie Batson, Jackson 'Rock' Pinckney	
A P R I L	7	Dead Calm	Warner Bros. Pictures	Phillip Noyce (director); Terry Hayes (screenplay); Sam Neill, Nicole Kidman, Billy Zane	
A P R I L	7	The Dream Team	Universal Pictures / Imagine Entertainment	Howard Zieff (director); Jon Connolly, David Loucka (screenplay); Michael Keaton, Christopher Lloyd, Peter Boyle, Stephen Furst, Lorraine Bracco, Dennis Boutsikaris, Milo O'Shea, Philip Bosco, James Remar, Michael Lembeck, Jack Riley, Larry Pine, John Stocker, Lizbeth MacKay, Ron James, Wayne Tippit, Ted Simonett, Freda Foh Shen, Dennis Parlato, Donna Hanover, Jihmi Kennedy	
A P R I L	7	Major League	Paramount Pictures / Morgan Creek Productions	David S. Ward (director/screenplay); Tom Berenger, Charlie Sheen, Corbin Bernsen, Margaret Whitton, James Gammon, Rene Russo, Bob Uecker, Wesley Snipes, Charles Cyphers, Chelcie Ross, Dennis Haysbert, Andy Romano, Kip Powers, Steve Yeager, Pete Vuckovich, Willie Mueller, Neil Flynn, Stacy Carroll, Todd Johnson, Ed Grode, Jr., Marc Daniloff	
A P R I L	14	Disorganized Crime	Touchstone Pictures / Silver Screen Partners	Jim Kouf (director/screenplay); Hoyt Axton, Corbin Bernsen, Rubén Blades, Fred Gwynne, Ed O'Neill, Lou Diamond Phillips, Daniel Roebuck, William Russ	
A P R I L	14	Say Anything...	20th Century Fox / Gracie Films	Cameron Crowe (director/screenplay); John Cusack, Ione Skye, John Mahoney, Lili Taylor, Polly Platt, Bebe Neuwirth, Jeremy Piven, Eric Stoltz, Amy Brooks, Loren Dean, Pamela Adlon, Chynna Phillips, Jason Gould, Philip Baker Hall, Joanna Frank, Lois Chiles, Joan Cusack, Dan Castellaneta	
A P R I L	14	She's Out of Control	Columbia Pictures	Stan Dragoti (director); Seth Winston, Michael J. Nathanson (screenplay); Tony Danza, Catherine Hicks, Ami Dolenz, Laura Mooney, Wallace Shawn, Derek McGrath, Dana Ashbrook, Matthew Perry, Dick O'Neill, Dustin Diamond, Oliver Muirhead, Lance Wilson-White	
A P R I L	14	Winter People	Columbia Pictures / Castle Rock Entertainment / Nelson Entertainment	Ted Kotcheff (director); Carol Sobieski (screenplay); Kurt Russell, Kelly McGillis, Lloyd Bridges, Mitchell Ryan, Jeffrey Meek, Don Michael Paul, Lanny Flaherty, Eileen Ryan, Amelia Burnette, David Dwyer	
A P R I L	20	Kickboxer	Cannon Films / Kings Road Entertainment	Mark DiSalle, David Worth (directors); Glenn A. Bruce (screenplay); Jean-Claude Van Damme, Dennis Alexio, Dennis Chan, Michel Qissi, Haskell Anderson, Jim Cummings, Ka Ting Lee, Rochelle Ashana, Richard Foo	
A P R I L	21	Checking Out	Warner Bros. Pictures / HandMade Films	David Leland (director); Joe Eszterhas (screenplay); Jeff Daniels, Melanie Mayron, Michael Tucker, Kathleen York, Ann Magnuson, Allan Havey	
A P R I L	21	Field of Dreams	Universal Pictures	Phil Alden Robinson (director/screenplay); Kevin Costner, Amy Madigan, James Earl Jones, Ray Liotta, Burt Lancaster, Timothy Busfield, Kelly Coffield Park, Frank Whaley, Gaby Hoffmann, Dwier Brown, Lee Garlington, Michael Milhoan, Steve Eastin, Charles Hoyes, Art LaFleur, Anne Seymour, Matt Damon, Ben Affleck	
A P R I L	21	Pet Sematary	Paramount Pictures	Mary Lambert (director); Stephen King (screenplay); Dale Midkiff, Fred Gwynne, Denise Crosby, Brad Greenquist, Michael Lombard, Miko Hughes, Blaze Berdahl, Susan Blommaert, Kavi Raz, Mary Louise Wilson, Andrew Hubatsek, Stephen King, Chuck Courtney, Matthew August Ferrell, Richard Collier, Elizabeth Ureneck	
A P R I L	21	Red Scorpion	Shapiro-Glickenhaus Entertainment	Joseph Zito (director); Jack Abramoff, Robert Abramoff, Arne Olson (screenplay); Dolph Lundgren, M. Emmet Walsh, Al White, T. P. McKenna, Carmen Argenziano, Brion James, Alex Colon, Ruben Nthodi	
A P R I L	21	See You in the Morning	Warner Bros. Pictures / Lorimar Film Entertainment	Alan J. Pakula (director/screenplay); Jeff Bridges, Alice Krige, Farrah Fawcett, Drew Barrymore, Lukas Haas, David Dukes, Frances Sternhagen, George Hearn, Theodore Bikel, Linda Lavin, Heather Lilly, Macaulay Culkin, Tom Aldredge, William LeMassena, Dorothy Dean, Alixe Gordin, Kate Williamson, Christopher Curry, Betsy Aidem, Robert Levine	
A P R I L	21	Speed Zone	Orion Pictures	Jim Drake (director); Michael Short (screenplay); Melody Anderson, Peter Boyle, Donna Dixon, John Candy, Eugene Levy, Dick Smothers, Tom Smothers, Shari Belafonte, Joe Flaherty, Matt Frewer	
A P R I L	21	Teen Witch	Metro-Goldwyn-Mayer / Trans World Entertainment	Dorian Walker (director); Robin Menken, Vernon Zimmerman (screenplay); Robyn Lively, Zelda Rubinstein, Dan Gauthier, Joshua John Miller, Caren Kaye, Dick Sargent, Lisa Fuller, Marcia Wallace, Amanda Ingber, Shelley Berman, Cindy Valentine, Megan A. Gallivan, Noah Blake, Tina Caspary	
A P R I L	23	Murderers Among Us: The Simon Wiesenthal Story	HBO Pictures / Citadel Entertainment	Brian Gibson (director); Abby Mann, Robin Vote, Ron Hutchinson (screenplay); Ben Kingsley, Renée Soutendijk, Craig T. Nelson, Anton Lesser, Jack Shepherd	
A P R I L	28	Criminal Law	Hemdale Film Corporation	Martin Campbell (director); Mark Kasdan (screenplay); Gary Oldman, Kevin Bacon, Tess Harper, Karen Young, Joe Don Baker, Sean McCann, Ron Lea, Michael Sinelnikoff, Elizabeth Shepherd	
A P R I L	28	Fast Food	Fries Entertainment	Michael A. Simpson (director); Clark Brandon, Lanny Horn, Scott B. Sowers, Jim Basile (screenplay); Clark Brandon, Tracy Griffith, Randal Patrick, Traci Lords, Pamela Springsteen, Michael J. Pollard, Jim Varney, Blake Clark	
A P R I L	28	The Horror Show	United Artists	James Isaac (director); Allyn Warner, Leslie Bohem (screenplay); Lance Henriksen, Brion James, Rita Taggart, Dedee Pfeiffer, Aron Eisenberg, Thom Bray, Matt Clark, David Oliver, Terry Alexander, Lawrence Tierney, Lewis Arquette	
A P R I L	28	K-9	Universal Pictures	Rod Daniel (director); Steven Siegel, Scott Myers, Lloyd Levin, Donna Smith (screenplay); Jim Belushi, Mel Harris, Kevin Tighe, Ed O'Neill, James Handy, Sherman Howard, Daniel Davis, Cotter Smith, John Snyder, Pruitt Taylor Vince, David Haskell, Alan Blumenfeld, Bill Sadler, Marjorie Bransfield, Jerry Levine, Dan Castellaneta, Wendel Meldrum, John Castellanos	
A P R I L	28	Loverboy	Tri-Star Pictures	Joan Micklin Silver (director); Robin Schiff, Tom Ropelewski, Leslie Dixon (screenplay); Patrick Dempsey, Kate Jackson, Carrie Fisher, Robert Ginty, Barbara Carrera, Kirstie Alley, Nancy Valen, Vic Tayback, Robert Picardo, Ray Girardin, E.G. Daily, Peter Koch, Robert Camilletti, Bernie Coulson, Dylan Walsh, Kim Miyori	
A P R I L	28	Miss Firecracker	Corsair Pictures	Thomas Schlamme (director); Beth Henley (screenplay); Holly Hunter, Mary Steenburgen, Tim Robbins, Alfre Woodard, Scott Glenn, Veanne Cox, Ann Wedgeworth, Trey Wilson, Amy Wright, Kathleen Chalfant, Greg Germann, Bert Remsen, Robert Fieldsteel, Avril Gentles, Angela Turner	
A P R I L	28	Scandal	Miramax Films	Michael Caton-Jones (director); Michael Thomas (screenplay); John Hurt, Joanne Whalley, Ian McKellen, Bridget Fonda, Leslie Phillips, Britt Ekland, Daniel Massey, Roland Gift, Jeroen Krabbé, Jean Alexander, Deborah Grant, Alex Norton, Ronald Fraser, Paul Brooke, Keith Allen, Ralph Brown, Iain Cuthbertson, Johnny Shannon, Leon Herbert	
M A Y	5	How to Get Ahead in Advertising	Warner Bros. Pictures / HandMade Films	Bruce Robinson (director/screenplay): Richard E. Grant, Rachel Ward, Richard Wilson, Jacqueline Tong, John Shrapnel, Susan Wooldridge, Hugh Armstrong, Mick Ford, Jacqueline Pearce	
M A Y	5	Listen to Me	Columbia Pictures	Douglas Day Stewart (director/screenplay); Jack Cummins, Daniel Arthur Wray (screenplay); Kirk Cameron, Jami Gertz, Roy Scheider, Amanda Peterson, George Wyner, Anthony Zerbe, Quinn Cummings, Christopher Atkins, Timothy Dang, Peter DeLuise, Jason Gould, Yeardley Smith,	
M A Y	5	Lost Angels	Orion Pictures	Hugh Hudson (director); Michael Weller (screenplay); Donald Sutherland, Adam Horovitz, Amy Locane, Don Bloomfield, Celia Weston, Graham Beckel, Patricia Richardson, Ron Frazier, Joe D'Angerio, William O'Leary, Kevin Corrigan, Gary Riley, Michael Cunningham, Leonard Porter Salazar, Jonathan Del Arco, Celia Newman, David Herman, Max Perlich, Nina Siemaszko, Kevin Tighe, John C. McGinley, Frances Fisher, Lee Wilkof, James N. Harrell, Jack Gold, Keone Young, Park Overall, Pauly Shore	
M A Y	5	Signs of Life	Avenue Pictures	John David Coles (director); Mark Malone (screenplay); Beau Bridges, Vincent D'Onofrio, Arthur Kennedy, Kevin J. O'Connor, Will Patton, Kate Reid, Georgia Engel, Kathy Bates, Mary-Louise Parker	
M A Y	12	Earth Girls Are Easy	Vestron Pictures / De Laurentiis Entertainment Group	Julien Temple (director); Julie Brown, Charlie Coffey, Terrence E. McNally (screenplay); Geena Davis, Jim Carrey, Damon Wayans, Jeff Goldblum, Julie Brown, Michael McKean, Charles Rocket, Larry Linville, Rick Overton, Diane Stilwell, Stacey Travis, Angelyne, Nedra Volz	
M A Y	12	The Rachel Papers	United Artists / Virgin Films	Damian Harris (director/screenplay); Dexter Fletcher, Ione Skye, Jonathan Pryce, James Spader, Bill Paterson, Michael Gambon, Lesley Sharp, Jared Harris, Aubrey Morris, Claire Skinner, Shirley Anne Field, Pat Keen, Amanda de Cadenet, Gina McKee, Eric Stoltz	
M A Y	12	The Return of Swamp Thing	Millimeter Films / Lightyear Entertainment / Batfilm Productions	Jim Wynorski (director); Neil Cuthbert, Grant Morris (screenplay); Louis Jourdan, Heather Locklear, Sarah Douglas, Dick Durock, Joey Sagal, Monique Gabrielle, RonReaco Lee, J. Don Ferguson, Frank Welker, Ace Mask, Daniel Emery Taylor, Rex Pierson	
M A Y	12	See No Evil, Hear No Evil	Tri-Star Pictures	Arthur Hiller (director); Earl Barret, Arne Sultan, Marvin Worth, Eliot Wald, Andrew Kurtzman, Gene Wilder (screenplay); Richard Pryor, Gene Wilder, Joan Severance, Kevin Spacey, Alan North, Anthony Zerbe, Louis Giambalvo, Kirsten Childs, Hardy Rawls, Audrie Neenan, Lauren Tom, John Capodice, George Bartenieff, Alexandra Neil, Tonya Pinkins, Bernie McInerney, Mary Kay Adams, George Harris, Zach Grenier, Joel Swetow, Jane Connell	
M A Y	19	Cold Feet	Avenue Pictures	Robert Dornhelm (director); Thomas McGuane, Jim Harrison (screenplay); Keith Carradine, Sally Kirkland, Tom Waits, Bill Pullman, Kathleen York, Rip Torn, Jeff Bridges, Macon McCalman, Vincent Schiavelli, Chuck Woolery	
M A Y	19	For Queen and Country	Atlantic Entertainment Group	Martin Stellman (director/screenplay); Trix Worrell (screenplay); Denzel Washington, Dorian Healy, Bruce Payne, Amanda Redman, Sean Chapman, Graham McTavish, Geff Francis, Frank Harper, Craig Fairbrass, George Baker, Stella Gonet, Ken Stott, Jimmi Harkishin, Stephen Lawrence, Michael Bray, Colin Thomas, Brian McDermott	
M A Y	19	Fright Night Part 2	New Century/Vista	Tommy Lee Wallace (director/screenplay); Tim Metcalfe, Miguel Tejada-Flores (screenplay); Roddy McDowall, William Ragsdale, Traci Lind, Julie Carmen, Jon Gries, Brian Thompson, Merritt Butrick, Ernie Sabella, Josh Richman, Blair Tefkin, Russell Clark	
M A Y	19	How I Got into College	20th Century Fox	Savage Steve Holland (director); Terrel Seltzer (screenplay); Anthony Edwards, Corey Parker, Lara Flynn Boyle, Finn Carter, Charles Rocket, Christopher Rydell, Brian Doyle-Murray, O-Lan Jones, Tichina Arnold, Bruce Wagner, Tom Kenny, Bill Raymond, Philip Baker Hall, Nicolas Coster, Richard Jenkins, Phil Hartman, Nora Dunn, Duane Davis, Diane Franklin, Robert Ridgely, Micole Mercurio, Bill Henderson, Richard Steven Horvitz, Curtis Armstrong, Taylor Negron	
M A Y	19	Miracle Mile	Columbia Pictures / Hemdale Film Corporation	Steve De Jarnatt (director/screenplay); Anthony Edwards, Mare Winningham, John Agar, Lou Hancock, Mykelti Williamson, Kelly Jo Minter, Kurt Fuller, Brian Thompson, Denise Crosby, Robert DoQui, O-Lan Jones, Claude Earl Jones, Alan Rosenberg, Danny De La Paz, Earl Boen, Raphael Sbarge, Lucille Bliss, Diane Delano, Edward Bunker, Peter Berg, Richard Biggs, Jenette Goldstein	
M A Y	19	Road House	Metro-Goldwyn-Mayer / United Artists / Silver Pictures	Rowdy Herrington (director); David Lee Henry, Hilary Henkin (screenplay); Patrick Swayze, Ben Gazzara, Kelly Lynch, Sam Elliott, Kevin Tighe, Red West, Jeff Healey, Sunshine Parker, Marshall Teague, John Doe, Kathleen Wilhoite, Terry Funk, Anthony De Longis, Keith David, Travis McKenna, John William Young, Julie Michaels, Michael Rider	
M A Y	24	Indiana Jones and the Last Crusade	Paramount Pictures / Lucasfilm	Steven Spielberg (director); Jeffrey Boam (screenplay); Harrison Ford, Sean Connery, Denholm Elliott, Alison Doody, John Rhys-Davies, Julian Glover, River Phoenix, Michael Byrne, Kevork Malikyan, Robert Eddison, Richard Young, Alexei Sayle, Alex Hyde-White, Paul Maxwell, Isla Blair, Vernon Dobtcheff, Bradley Gregg, Frederick Jaeger, Eugene Lipinski	
M A Y	26	Pink Cadillac	Warner Bros. Pictures / Malpaso Productions	Buddy Van Horn (director); John Eskow (screenplay); Clint Eastwood, Bernadette Peters, Timothy Carhart, John Dennis Johnston, Gerry Bamman, Michael Des Barres, Jimmie F. Skaggs, Bill Moseley, Michael Champion, William Hickey, Geoffrey Lewis, Dirk Blocker, Frances Fisher, Paul Benjamin, Bryan Adams, Mara Corday, Jim Carrey, James Cromwell, Bill McKinney	
M A Y	28	Third Degree Burn	HBO Pictures / Paramount Pictures / MTM Enterprises	Roger Spottiswoode (director); Duncan Gibbins, Yale Udoff (screenplay); Treat Williams, Virginia Madsen, Richard Masur, CCH Pounder, Mary Armstrong, John Aylward, George Catalano, Michael Chapman, William Marquez, Joe Mays, Robert Nadir, Alex Thayer, Rick Tutor, Lisa Zebro	
J U N E	2	Dead Poets Society	Touchstone Pictures / Silver Screen Partners	Peter Weir (director); Tom Schulman (screenplay); Robin Williams, Robert Sean Leonard, Ethan Hawke, Josh Charles, Lara Flynn Boyle, Gale Hansen, Norman Lloyd, Kurtwood Smith, Dylan Kussman, Melora Walters, James Waterston, Alexandra Powers, Leon Pownall, George Martin, Allelon Ruggiero, Jane Moore, Kevin Cooney, Colin Irving, Matt Carey, John Cunningham	
J U N E	2	No Holds Barred	New Line Cinema / WWE Studios	Thomas J. Wright (director); Dennis Hackin (screenplay); Hulk Hogan, Kurt Fuller, Joan Severance, Tiny Lister, Jr., Mark Pellegrino, Bill Henderson, Charles Levin, David Paymer, Patrick O'Bryan, Jeep Swenson, Bill Eadie, Stan Hansen, Rebecca Wackler, Bruce Taylor, Gene Okerlund, Jesse Ventura, Howard Finkel, Joey Marella, Rick Allen	
J U N E	2	Renegades	Universal Pictures / Morgan Creek Productions / Interscope Communications	Jack Sholder (director); David Rich (screenplay); Kiefer Sutherland, Lou Diamond Phillips, Robert Knepper, Bill Smitrovich, Jami Gertz, Clark Johnson, Peter MacNeill, Floyd Red Crow Westerman, Joseph Griffin, Kyra Harper	
J U N E	2	Scenes from the Class Struggle in Beverly Hills	Cinecom Pictures	Paul Bartel (director); Bruce Wagner (screenplay); Jacqueline Bisset, Ray Sharkey, Mary Woronov, Robert Beltran, Ed Begley Jr., Wallace Shawn, Arnetia Walker, Paul Bartel, Paul Mazursky, Rebecca Schaeffer, Barret Oliver, Edith Diaz, Susan Saiger, Jerry Tondo, Michael Feinstein, Frank Welker, Little Richard	
J U N E	2	Vampire's Kiss	Hemdale Film Corporation	Robert Bierman (director); Joseph Minion (screenplay); Nicolas Cage, María Conchita Alonso, Jennifer Beals, Elizabeth Ashley, Kasi Lemmons, Bob Lujan, Jessica Lundy, John Walker, Boris Leskin, Michael Knowles, John Michael Higgins, Jodie Markell, Marc Coppola, David Hyde Pierce, Amy Stiller, Christopher Sluka, ESG	
J U N E	9	Star Trek V: The Final Frontier	Paramount Pictures	William Shatner (director); David Loughery (screenplay); William Shatner, Leonard Nimoy, DeForest Kelley, James Doohan, Walter Koenig, Nichelle Nichols, George Takei, David Warner, Laurence Luckinbill, Charles Cooper, Cynthia Gouw, Todd Bryant, Spice Williams-Crosby, Rex Holman, George Murdock, Steve Susskind, Harve Bennett, Bill Quinn, Melanie Shatner, Michael Berryman, Carey Scott, Mike Smithson	
J U N E	16	Ghostbusters II	Columbia Pictures	Ivan Reitman (director); Harold Ramis, Dan Aykroyd (screenplay); Bill Murray, Dan Aykroyd, Sigourney Weaver, Harold Ramis, Rick Moranis, Ernie Hudson, Annie Potts, Peter MacNicol, Kurt Fuller, David Margulies, Harris Yulin, Janet Margolin, Wilhelm von Homburg, William T. Deutschendorf, Hank J. Deutschendorf II, Mary Ellen Trainor, Jason Reitman, Aaron Lustig, Catherine Reitman, Richard Foronjy, George P. Wilbur, Bobby Brown, Christopher Neame, Tom Dugan, Robert Alan Beuth, Cheech Marin, Brian Doyle-Murray, Louise Troy, Douglas Seale, Ben Stein, Philip Baker Hall, Kevin Dunn, Jim Fyfe, Ivan Reitman, Felix Silla, Max von Sydow, Chloe Webb	
J U N E	23	Batman	Warner Bros. Pictures / Guber-Peters Company	Tim Burton (director); Sam Hamm, Warren Skaaren (screenplay); Michael Keaton, Jack Nicholson, Kim Basinger, Robert Wuhl, Pat Hingle, Billy Dee Williams, Michael Gough, Jack Palance, Jerry Hall, Tracey Walter, Lee Wallace, William Hootkins, Richard Strange, John Sterland, Edwin Craig, Vincent Wong, John Dair, Christopher Fairbank, Richard Durden, Kit Hollerbach, Lachele Carl, Rocky Taylor, Leon Herbert, Steve Plytas, Amir Korangy, Michael Balfour, Garrick Hagon, Sam Douglas, Denis Lill, Paul Birchard, Lech Majewski, Jimmy Star, David Baxt, Sharon Holm	
J U N E	23	Honey, I Shrunk the Kids	Walt Disney Pictures	Joe Johnston (director); Ed Naha, Tom Schulman (screenplay); Rick Moranis, Marcia Strassman, Amy O'Neill, Robert Oliveri, Matt Frewer, Kristine Sutherland, Thomas Wilson Brown, Jared Rushton, Carl Steven, Mark L. Taylor, Kimmy Robertson, Lou Cutell, Frank Welker, Craig Richard Nelson	
J U N E	25	Traveling Man	HBO Pictures	Irvin Kershner (director); David Taylor (screenplay); John Lithgow, Jonathan Silverman, Margaret Colin, John Glover, John M. Jackson, Chynna Phillips, J. Don Ferguson, Jennifer Hale, Paul Armbruster, Dawn Arnemann, Jerry Campbell, Marc Clement, Saundra Dunson-Franks, David Dwyer, Danny Nelson, Bob Penny, Johnny Popwell, Alex Van, Tim Ware	
J U N E	30	Do the Right Thing	Universal Pictures / 40 Acres and a Mule Filmworks	Spike Lee (director/screenplay); Danny Aiello, Ossie Davis, Ruby Dee, Richard Edson, Giancarlo Esposito, Spike Lee, Bill Nunn, John Turturro, Paul Benjamin, Frankie Faison, Robin Harris, Joie Lee, Miguel Sandoval, Rick Aiello, John Savage, Samuel L. Jackson, Rosie Perez, Roger Guenveur Smith, Steve White, Martin Lawrence, Leonard L. Thomas, Christa Rivers, Frank Vincent, Luis Antonio Ramos, Richard Parnell Habersham, Steve Park, Erik Dellums, Garry Pastore, Michael Ralph, Nicholas Turturro	
J U N E	30	Great Balls of Fire!	Orion Pictures	Jim McBride (director/screenplay); Jack Baran (screenplay); Dennis Quaid, Winona Ryder, Alec Baldwin, Trey Wilson, John Doe, Stephen Tobolowsky, Lisa Blount, Mojo Nixon, Jimmie Vaughan, Steve Allen, Joshua Sheffield, David R. Ferguson, Robert Lesser, Michael St. Gerard, Lisa Jane Persky, Peter Cook, Jerry Lee Lewis	
J U N E	30	The Karate Kid Part III	Columbia Pictures	John G. Avildsen (director); Robert Mark Kamen (screenplay); Ralph Macchio, Pat Morita, Robyn Lively, Thomas Ian Griffith, Martin Kove, Sean Kanan, Jonathan Avildsen, Christopher Paul Ford, Randee Heller, Pat E. Johnson, Rick Hurst, Frances Bay, Joseph V. Perry, Jan Tříska, Glenn Medeiros, Gabe Jarret	

== July–September ==
Opening		Title	Production company	Cast and crew	Ref.
J U L Y	5	Weekend at Bernie's	20th Century Fox / Gladden Entertainment	Ted Kotcheff (director); Robert Klane (screenplay); Andrew McCarthy, Jonathan Silverman, Catherine Mary Stewart, Terry Kiser, Don Calfa, Catherine Parks, Eloise Broady, Gregory Salata, Louis Giambalvo, Ted Kotcheff, Margaret Hall, Jason Woliner	
J U L Y	7	Lethal Weapon 2	Warner Bros. Pictures / Silver Pictures	Richard Donner (director); Jeffrey Boam (screenplay); Mel Gibson, Danny Glover, Joe Pesci, Joss Ackland, Derrick O'Connor, Patsy Kensit, Darlene Love, Traci Wolfe, Steve Kahan, Mark Rolston, Jenette Goldstein, Dean Norris, Juney Smith, Nestor Serrano, Philip Suriano, Grand L. Bush, Tony Carreiro, Damon Hines, Ebonie Smith, Jack McGee, Sherman Howard, Pat Skipper, Jim Piddock, Kenneth Tigar, Mary Ellen Trainor, David Marciano, Tommy Hinkley, Norman D. Wilson, Marian Collier, J. Mills Goodloe	
J U L Y	14	Licence to Kill	United Artists / Eon Productions	John Glen (director); Michael G. Wilson, Richard Maibaum (screenplay); Timothy Dalton, Carey Lowell, Robert Davi, Talisa Soto, Anthony Zerbe, Frank McRae, Everett McGill, Desmond Llewelyn, Robert Brown, Caroline Bliss, Anthony Starke, Grand L. Bush, Benicio del Toro, Alejandro Bracho, Guy De Saint Cyr, Diana Lee-Hsu, Rafer Johnson, David Hedison, Don Stroud, Priscilla Barnes, Cary-Hiroyuki Tagawa, Pedro Armendáriz, Wayne Newton, Christopher Neame, Roger Cudney, Claudio Brook, Enrique Novi, Jorge Russek, Humberto Elizondo, Carl Ciarfalio, Branscombe Richmond, Michael G. Wilson	
J U L Y	14	Peter Pan (re-release)	Walt Disney Pictures / RKO Radio Pictures	Clyde Geronimi, Wilfred Jackson, Hamilton Luske (directors); Milt Banta, Bill Cottrell, Winston Hibler, Bill Peet, Erdman Penner, Joe Rinaldi, Ted Sears, Ralph Wright (screenplay); Bobby Driscoll, Kathryn Beaumont, Hans Conried, Bill Thompson, Heather Angel, Paul Collins, Tommy Luske, Candy Candido, Tom Conway, Roland Dupree, Don Barclay, Lucille Bliss, Stuffy Singer, Johnny McGovern, Robert Ellis, June Foray, Margaret Kerry, Jeffrey Silver, Connie Hilton, Karen Kester	
J U L Y	21	Shag	Hemdale Film Corporation	Zelda Barron (director); Lanier Laney, Terry Sweeney, Robin Swicord (screenplay); Phoebe Cates, Scott Coffey, Bridget Fonda, Annabeth Gish, Page Hannah, Robert Rusler, Tyrone Power Jr., Jeff Yagher, Carrie Hamilton, Leilani Sarelle, Paul Lieber, Donald Craig, Shirley Anne Field, Jay Baker, Joe Seely, Pearl Jones, Bonnie Johnson	
J U L Y	21	UHF	Orion Pictures	Jay Levey (director/screenplay); "Weird Al" Yankovic (screenplay); "Weird Al" Yankovic, Kevin McCarthy, Michael Richards, David Bowe, Victoria Jackson, Fran Drescher, Stanley Brock, Sue Ane Langdon, Anthony Geary, Billy Barty, Trinidad Silva, Gedde Watanabe, Vance Colvig Jr., David Proval, Grant James, John Paragon, Belinda Bauer, Dr. Demento, Emo Philips, Patrick Thomas O'Brien, The Kipper Kids, Robert K. Weiss, Tony Frank, Tamara Clatterbuck	
J U L Y	21	When Harry Met Sally...	Columbia Pictures / Castle Rock Entertainment / Nelson Entertainment	Rob Reiner (director); Nora Ephron (screenplay); Billy Crystal, Meg Ryan, Carrie Fisher, Bruno Kirby, Steven Ford, Lisa Jane Persky, Michelle Nicastro, Kevin Rooney, Harley Jane Kozak, Estelle Reiner, Gretchen Palmer, Franc Luz, Tracy Reiner, Kyle T. Heffner, Connie Sawyer, Katherine Squire, Ingrid Bergman, Claude Rains	
J U L Y	28	Babar: The Movie	New Line Cinema / Nelvana	Alan Bunce (director/screenplay); Peter Sauder, J.D. Smith, John de Klein, Raymond Jafelice (screenplay); Gordon Pinsent, Elizabeth Hanna, Lisa Yamanaka, Bobby Becken, Sarah Polley, Stephen Ouimette, Chris Wiggins, John Stocker, Stuart Stone, Carl Banas, Angela Fusco, Christopher Britton, Jason Burke, Frank Perry, Norm Spencer, Marsha Moreau, Amos Crawley, Gavin Magrath, Charles Kerr, Ray Landry, Barbara Mantini, Christopher Andrande, Scott Brunt, Katie Coristine, Chris Robson, Lea-Helen Weir	
J U L Y	28	Friday the 13th Part VIII: Jason Takes Manhattan	Paramount Pictures	Rob Hedden (director/screenplay); Jensen Daggett, Scott Reeves, Barbara Bingham, Peter Mark Richman, Martin Cummins, Gordon Currie, Alex Diakun, V.C. Dupree, Saffron Henderson, Kelly Hu, Sharlene Martin, Warren Munson, Kane Hodder, Ken Kirzinger, Fred Henderson, Michael Benyaer, Roger Barnes, Amber Pawlick, Timothy Burr Mirkovich	
J U L Y	28	Turner & Hooch	Touchstone Pictures / Silver Screen Partners	Roger Spottiswoode (director); Dennis Shryack, Michael Blodgett, Daniel Petrie Jr., Jim Cash, Jack Epps Jr. (screenplay); Tom Hanks, Mare Winningham, Craig T. Nelson, Reginald VelJohnson, Scott Paulin, John McIntire, Ebbe Roe Smith, Ernie Lively, Clyde Kusatsu, Elden Henson, Jules Sylvester, Nick Dimitri, Jim Beaver, J.C. Quinn, David Knell, Kevin Scannell, Joel Bailey, Mary McCusker, Elaine Renee Bush, Eda Reiss Merin, Victor DiMattia	
A U G U S T	1	Who Shot Pat?	Castle Hill Productions	Robert Brooks (director/screenplay); Halle Brooks (screenplay); David Knight, Sandra Bullock, Kevin Otto, Aaron Ingram, Brad Randall, Chris Cardona, Michael Puzzo, Christopher Crean, Gregg Marc Miller, Damon Chandler, Bridget Fogle, Phil Rosenthal, Clint Jordan, Ella Arolovi, Nicholas Reiner, Henry Paul, Allison Janney	
A U G U S T	2	Parenthood	Universal Pictures / Imagine Entertainment	Ron Howard (director); Lowell Ganz, Babaloo Mandel (screenplay); Steve Martin, Tom Hulce, Rick Moranis, Martha Plimpton, Keanu Reeves, Jason Robards, Mary Steenburgen, Dianne Wiest, Dennis Dugan, Leaf Phoenix, Eileen Ryan, Helen Shaw, Jasen Fisher, Paul Linke, Alisan Porter, Ivyann Schwann, Clint Howard, Max Elliott Slade, Lowell Ganz, Rance Howard, Todd Hallowell, Charmin Lee, Bryce Dallas Howard, Howie Dorough	
A U G U S T	4	Lock Up	Tri-Star Pictures / Carolco Pictures	John Flynn (director); Richard Smith, Jeb Stuart, Henry Rosenbaum (screenplay); Sylvester Stallone, Donald Sutherland, John Amos, Darlanne Fluegel, Frank McRae, Sonny Landham, Tom Sizemore, William Allen Young, Larry Romano, Jordan Lund, Danny Trejo, Frank Pesce, Anthony Crivello, John Lilla, Dean Duval, Jerry Strivelli, David Anthony Marshall, Kurek Ashley, Michael Petroni	
A U G U S T	4	Young Einstein	Warner Bros. Pictures	Yahoo Serious (director/screenplay); David Roach (screenplay); Yahoo Serious, Odile Le Clezio, John Howard, Ian "Peewee" Wilson, Su Cruickshank, Lulu Pinkus, Kaarin Fairfax, Jonathan Coleman, Basil Clarke, Steve Abbott	
A U G U S T	9	The Abyss	20th Century Fox	James Cameron (director/screenplay); Ed Harris, Mary Elizabeth Mastrantonio, Michael Biehn, Leo Burmester, Todd Graff, John Bedford Lloyd, Kimberly Scott, Chris Elliott, Richard Warlock, J. Kenneth Campbell, William Wisher Jr., Ken Jenkins, Michael Beach, Brad Sullivan, Frank Lloyd, Joe Farago, Thomas F. Duffy, Michael Chapman, Daren Dochterman, Mikhail Gorbachev, J.C. Quinn, Captain "Kidd" Brewer Jr., George Robert Klek, Christopher Murphy, Adam Nelson, Jimmie Ray Weeks	
A U G U S T	11	A Nightmare on Elm Street 5: The Dream Child	New Line Cinema / Heron Communications	Stephen Hopkins (director); Leslie Bohem (screenplay); Robert Englund, Lisa Wilcox, Danny Hassel, Kelly Jo Minter, Erika Anderson, Joe Seely, Beatrice Boepple, Whitby Hertford, Nicholas Mele, Valorie Armstrong, Burr DeBenning, Clarence Felder, Matt Borlenghi, Noble Craig, Don Maxwell, Marnette Patterson, Michael Bailey Smith, Ted Nugent, Eric Singer	
A U G U S T	16	Rude Awakening	Orion Pictures / Aaron Russo Productions / Cineplex Odeon Films	David Greenwalt, Aaron Russo (directors); Neil Levy, Richard LaGravenese (screenplay); Cheech Marin, Eric Roberts, Julie Hagerty, Robert Carradine, Buck Henry, Louise Lasser, Cindy Williams, Andrea Martin, Cliff DeYoung, Tom Sizemore, Aaron Russo, Timothy Leary, Bobby Seale, Elzbieta Czyzewska, Bradford Tatum, Dave King, David Eigenberg, Michelle Hurd, Glenn Taranto, Melora Walters	
A U G U S T	16	Uncle Buck	Universal Pictures / Hughes Entertainment	John Hughes (director/screenplay); John Candy, Amy Madigan, Jean Louisa Kelly, Macaulay Culkin, Gaby Hoffmann, Jay Underwood, Laurie Metcalf, Elaine Bromka, Garrett M. Brown, Brian Tarantina, Mike Starr, Suzanne Shepherd, William Windom, Dennis Cockrum, Anna Chlumsky, Patricia Arquette, Jack Blessing, Leigh French, Julie Payne	
A U G U S T	18	Blood Red	Hemdale Film Corporation	Peter Masterson (director); Ron Cutler (screenplay); Eric Roberts, Giancarlo Giannini, Dennis Hopper, Burt Young, Carlin Glynn, Lara Harris, Joseph Runningfox, Al Ruscio, Michael Madsen, Elias Koteas, Francesca De Sapio, Marc Lawrence, Frank Campanella, Aldo Ray, Gary Swanson, Susan Anspach, Kevin Cooney, Julia Roberts, Charles Dierkop, Carol Ann Susi, Sergio Calderón, Matt O'Toole, John de Lancie	
A U G U S T	18	Casualties of War	Columbia Pictures	Brian De Palma (director); David Rabe (screenplay); Michael J. Fox, Sean Penn, Don Patrick Harvey, John C. Reilly, John Leguizamo, Thuy Thu Le, Erik King, Jack Gwaltney, Ving Rhames, Dale Dye, Holt McCallany, Dan Martin, Wendell Pierce, Sam Robards, Steve Larson, Vyto Ruginis, Maris Valainis, Darren E. Burrows, Sherman Howard, John Marshall Jones, Donal Gibson, Stephen Baldwin, Gregg Henry, Amy Irving	
A U G U S T	18	Cheetah	Walt Disney Pictures	Jeff Blyth (director); Erik Tarloff, John Cotter, Griff Du Rhone (screenplay); Keith Coogan, Lucy Deakins, Paul Onsongo, Jim Ward, Collin Mothupi, Timothy Landfield, Breon Gorman-Landfield, Mhlangabezi Ka Vundla, Lydia Kigada, Kuldeep Bhakoo, Anthony Baird, Rory McGuinness, Rod Jacobsen, David Adido	
A U G U S T	18	A Chorus of Disapproval	Curzon Films	Michael Winner (director/screenplay); Alan Ayckbourn (screenplay); Jeremy Irons, Anthony Hopkins, Prunella Scales, Jenny Seagrove, Sylvia Sims, Gareth Hunt, Patsy Kensit, Lionel Jeffries, Alexandra Pigg, Richard Briers, Barbara Ferris, Pete Lee-Wilson, Dinah May, David King, Amanda Mainard, Anne Priestley, Audrey Trotter	
A U G U S T	18	Cookie	Warner Bros. Pictures / Lorimar Film Entertainment	Susan Seidelman (director); Nora Ephron, Alice Arlen (screenplay); Peter Falk, Dianne Wiest, Emily Lloyd, Michael V. Gazzo, Brenda Vaccaro, Adrian Pasdar, Lionel Stander, Jerry Lewis, Bob Gunton, Joe Mantello, Ricki Lake, David Wohl, Joy Behar, Rockets Redglare, Tony Sirico, George Bartenieff, Ed Setrakian, Mark Boone Junior, Kim Chan, Crystal Field, Jerry Blavat, Marv Albert	
A U G U S T	18	Eddie and the Cruisers II: Eddie Lives!	Aurora Productions	Jean-Claude Lord (director); Charles Zev Cohen, Rick Doehring (screenplay); Michael Paré, Marina Orsini, Bernie Coulson, Matthew Laurance, Michael "Tunes" Antunes, Michael Rhoades, Anthony Sherwood, David Matheson, Mark Holmes, Harvey Atkin, Paul Markle, Kate Lynch, Vlasta Vrana, Elizabeth MacRae, Marc Denis, Larry King, Martha Quinn, Bo Diddley, Joe Pantoliano, Helen Schneider	
A U G U S T	18	Let It Ride	Paramount Pictures	Joe Pytka (director); Ernest Morton (screenplay); Richard Dreyfuss, David Johansen, Teri Garr, Jennifer Tilly, Allen Garfield, Ed Walsh, Richard Edson, David Schramm, John Roselius, Joseph Walsh, Ralph Seymour, Cynthia Nixon, Richard Dimitri, Robert Towers, Michelle Phillips, Robbie Coltrane, Tony Longo, Mary Woronov, Trevor R. Denman, Sid Raymond, S.A. Griffin, Martin Garner, Myra Turley, David Landsberg, Ralph Ahn, Rodney Kageyama	
A U G U S T	18	Sex, Lies, and Videotape	Miramax Films	Steven Soderbergh (director/screenplay); James Spader, Andie MacDowell, Peter Gallagher, Laura San Giacomo, Steven Brill, Ron Vawter	
A U G U S T	20	Tailspin: Behind the Korean Airliner Tragedy	HBO Showcase / Granada Television	David Darlow (director); Brian Phelan (screenplay); Michael Murphy, Michael Moriarty, Chris Sarandon, Harris Yulin, Bradley Lavelle, Jay Patterson, Shane Rimmer, Rolf Saxon, Angus MacInnes, Vincent Marzello, Brian Greene, Ed O'Ross, Gavan O'Herlihy, Robert Jezek, Garrick Hagon, Michael Shannon, Tomasz Borkowy, Stéphane Cornicard, Togo Igawa, Soon Tek-Oh, Debora Weston, Colin Bruce, Marc Smith, Nic D'Avirro, Weston Gavin, Stephen Hoye, Thomasine Heiner, William Roberts, George Roth, Mark Burton, Otto Jarman, Kieron Jecchinis, Matthew Freeman, Jana Shelden, Joris Stuyck, Boris Isarov, Alexei Jawdokimov	
A U G U S T	25	Heart of Dixie	Orion Pictures	Martin Davidson (director); Anne Rivers Siddons, Tom McCown (screenplay); Ally Sheedy, Virginia Madsen, Phoebe Cates, Don Michael Paul, Kurtwood Smith, Richard Bradford, Treat Williams, Kyle Secor, Francesca P. Roberts, Peter Berg, Jenny Robertson, Lisa Zane, Ashley Gardner, Eddy Kiihnl, Barbara Babcock, Michael St. Gerard	
A U G U S T	25	Little Monsters	United Artists	Richard Alan Greenberg (director); Terry Rossio, Ted Elliott (screenplay); Fred Savage, Howie Mandel, Ben Savage, Daniel Stern, Margaret Whitton, Frank Whaley, Rick Ducommun, Amber Barretto, Devin Ratray, William Murray Weiss, Kala Savage, Natanya Ross	
A U G U S T	25	The Package	Orion Pictures	Andrew Davis (director); John Bishop (screenplay); Gene Hackman, Joanna Cassidy, Tommy Lee Jones, John Heard, Dennis Franz, Pam Grier, Kevin Crowley, Ron Dean, Nathan Davis, Chelcie Ross, Ike Pappas, Marco St. John, Reni Santoni, Johnny Lee Davenport, Thalmus Rasulala, Harry Lennix, Wilhelm von Homburg, Dick Cusack, Boris Leskin, Danny Goldring, Gregory Alan Williams, Kathryn Joosten, Dennis Cockrum	
A U G U S T	25	Wired	FM Entertainment / Taurus Entertainment	Larry Peerce (director); Earl Mac Rauch (screenplay); Michael Chiklis, J.T. Walsh, Patti D'Arbanville, Lucinda Jenney, Alex Rocco, Gary Groomes, Ray Sharkey, Jere Burns, Clyde Kusatsu, Tom Bower, Earl Billings, Dakin Matthews, Steve Vinovich, Blake Clark, Scott Plank, Brooke McCarter, Paul Ben-Victor, Ned Bellamy, Ron Perkins, Billy Preston, Neil Portnow, J.C. Quinn, Matthew Faison, Jon Snyder	
A U G U S T	30	Shirley Valentine	Paramount Pictures	Lewis Gilbert (director); Willy Russell (screenplay); Pauline Collins, Tom Conti, Julia McKenzie, Alison Steadman, Joanna Lumley, Bernard Hill, George Costigan, Anna Keaveney, Tracie Bennett, Sylvia Sims, Gillian Kearney, Marc Zuber, Ken Sharrock, Karen Craig, Gareth Jefferson, Catharine Duncan	
S E P T E M B E R	1	Relentless	New Line Cinema / CineTel Films	William Lustig (director); Phil Alden Robinson (screenplay); Judd Nelson, Robert Loggia, Leo Rossi, Meg Foster, Patrick O'Bryan, Ken Lerner, Mindy Seeger, Angel Tompkins, Beau Starr, Frank Pesce, Ron Taylor, Roy Brocksmith, George "Buck" Flower, George Gallo, William Lustig, Armand Mastroianni, Michael Weiner	
S E P T E M B E R	15	Sea of Love	Universal Pictures	Harold Becker (director); Richard Price (screenplay); Al Pacino, Ellen Barkin, John Goodman, Michael Rooker, William Hickey, Richard Jenkins, John Spencer, Michael O'Neill, Paul Calderón, Gene Canfield, Larry Joshua, Christine Estabrook, Barbara Baxley, Patricia Barry, Luis Antonio Ramos, Rafael Báez, Samuel L. Jackson, Damien Leake, Jacqueline Brookes, Nancy Beatty, Hugh Thompson, Christopher Maleki	
S E P T E M B E R	15	True Love	United Artists	Nancy Savoca (director/screenplay); Richard Guay (screenplay); Annabella Sciorra, Ron Eldard, Aida Turturro, Star Jasper, Rick Shapiro, Vincent Pastore, Marianne Leone, George Russo, Saverio Guerra, Ray Tintori, Roger Rignack, Michael James Wolfe, Kelly Cinnante	
S E P T E M B E R	16	The Heist	HBO Pictures	Stuart Orme (director); William Irish Jr., David Fuller, Rick Natkin (screenplay); Pierce Brosnan, Tom Skerritt, Wendy Hughes, Noble Willingham, Tom Atkins, Robert Prosky, Chino 'Fats' Williams, Stephen Apostolina, Shelton Redden, Roger Hewlett, Joseph Carberry, Art Frankel, Ben Mittleman, Nino Surdo	
S E P T E M B E R	20	Gandahar	Miramax Films	René Laloux (director/screenplay); Glenn Close, Jennifer Grey, Terrence Mann, Penn and Teller, John Shea, Bridget Fonda, David Johansen, Christopher Plummer, Earl Hammond, Paul Shaffer, Earle Hyman, Dennis Predovic, Chip Bolcik, Sheila McCarthy, Kevin O'Rourke, Jill Haworth, Charles Busch	
S E P T E M B E R	22	Black Rain	Paramount Pictures	Ridley Scott (director); Craig Bolotin, Warren Lewis (screenplay); Michael Douglas, Andy García, Ken Takakura, Kate Capshaw, Yūsaku Matsuda, Shigeru Kōyama, John Spencer, Guts Ishimatsu, Yuya Uchida, Tomisaburo Wakayama, Miyuki Ono, Luis Guzmán, John Costelloe, Stephen Root, Richard Riehle, Jun Kunimura, Tim Kelleher, Rikiya Yasuoka, Vondie Curtis-Hall, Josip Elic, Keone Young, Jim Ishida, Takayuki Kubota, Shiro Oishi, Nathan Jung, Al Leong, Professor Toru Tanaka, David Tao, Ken Kensei, Shôtarô Hayashi, Toshishiro Obata, Mak Takano, Bruce Locke, Jôji Shimaki	
S E P T E M B E R	22	A Dry White Season	MGM/UA	Euzhan Palcy (director/screenplay); Colin Welland (screenplay); Donald Sutherland, Janet Suzman, Jürgen Prochnow, Zakes Mokae, Susan Sarandon, Marlon Brando, Susannah Harker, Leonard Maguire, Winston Ntshona, Michael Gambon, John Kani, Gerard Thoolen, David de Keyser, Richard Wilson, Ronald Pickup, Paul Brooke, Rosemary Martin, Thoko Ntshinga, Rowen Elmes, Bekhithemba Mpofu	
S E P T E M B E R	22	Erik the Viking	Orion Pictures	Terry Jones (director/screenplay); Tim Robbins, Mickey Rooney, Eartha Kitt, Terry Jones, Imogen Stubbs, John Cleese, Antony Sher, Charles McKeown, Tim McInnerny, John Gordon Sinclair, Richard Ridings, Freddie Jones, Samantha Bond, Jim Broadbent, Jim Carter, Graham McTavish, Neil Innes, Allan Surtees, Tsutomu Sekine, John Scott Martin, Tilly Vosburgh, Jay Simpson, Sian Thomas, Sarah Crowden, Andrew MacLachlan, Cyril Shaps, Paddy Joyce, Barry McCarthy, Danny Schiller, Gary Cady, Matyelok Gibbs, Simon Evans, Matthew Baker	
S E P T E M B E R	22	Heavy Petting	Skouras Pictures / Americas in Transition	Obie Benz, Joshua Waletzky (directors); Pierce Rafferty (screenplay); David Byrne, Abbie Hoffman, Ann Magnuson, Frances Fisher, Spalding Gray, William S. Burroughs, Laurie Anderson, Sandra Bernhard, Allen Ginsberg, Josh Mostel, John Oates, Wayne Jobson, Jacki Ochs, Corey Allen, Jim Backus, Bernard J. Berry, Virginia Christine, Dick Clark, Walter Coy, Joseph Crehan, James Dean, Ann Doran, Duka, Glenn Ford, Lorne Greene, Samuel S. Hinds, Dennis Hopper, Zoë Lund, Judith Malina, Jayne Mansfield, Paul Mazursky, Doug McClure, Marilyn Monroe, Mary Murphy, Don Murray, Ricky Nelson, Sidney Poitier, Elvis Presley, George Putnam, Shepperd Strudwick, Mamie Van Doren, Tuesday Weld, Natalie Wood, Skip Young	
S E P T E M B E R	22	Penn & Teller Get Killed	Warner Bros. Pictures	Arthur Penn (director); Penn Jillette, Teller (screenplay); Penn Jillette, Teller, Caitlin Clarke, Celia McGuire, David Patrick Kelly, Leonardo Cimino, Bill Randolph, Jon Cryer, Christopher Durang, Tom Sizemore, James Randi, Billy Morrissette, Leonard Parker, Camille Saviola, Jamie Tirelli, Paul Calderon, Eddie Gorodetsky, Nancy Giles, Robert LaSardo, Reg E. Cathey, Alan North, Matthew Penn	
S E P T E M B E R	27	C.H.U.D. II: Bud the C.H.U.D.	Vestron Pictures / Lightning Pictures	David Irving (director); M. Kane Jeeves (screenplay); Brian Robbins, Bill Calvert, Tricia Leigh Fisher, Gerrit Graham, Robert Vaughn, Larry Cedar, Bianca Jagger, Larry Linville, Jack Riley, Sandra Kerns, June Lockhart, Norman Fell, Rich Hall, Robert Symonds, Priscilla Pointer, Marvin J. McIntyre, Ritch Shydner, Clive Revill, Winifred Freedman, Sarah Berry, Gregg Binkley, Michael Bell, Robert Englund	
S E P T E M B E R	29	In Country	Warner Bros. Pictures	Norman Jewison (director); Frank Pierson, Cynthia Cidre, Bobbie Ann Mason (screenplay); Bruce Willis, Emily Lloyd, Joan Allen, Kevin Anderson, John Terry, Peggy Rea, Judith Ivey, Daniel Jenkins, Stephen Tobolowsky, Jim Beaver, Richard Hamilton, Heidi Swedberg, Ken Jenkins, Jonathan Hogan, Patricia Richardson	
S E P T E M B E R	29	Johnny Handsome	Tri-Star Pictures / Carolco Pictures	Walter Hill (director); Ken Friedman (screenplay); Mickey Rourke, Ellen Barkin, Elizabeth McGovern, Forest Whitaker, Scott Wilson, Lance Henriksen, Morgan Freeman, David Schramm, Yvonne Bryceland, Peter Jason, Jeff Meek, Allan Graf, Raynor Scheine, Ken Medlock, Blake Clark, J.W. Smith, Ed Zang, John Fertitta, Edward Walsh	
S E P T E M B E R	29	Welcome Home	Columbia Pictures	Franklin J. Schaffner (director); Maggie Kleinman (screenplay); Kris Kristofferson, JoBeth Williams, Sam Waterston, Brian Keith, Thomas Wilson Brown, Trey Wilson, John Marshall Jones, Ken Pogue, Kieu Chinh, Nancy Beatty, Jason St. Amour, Victor Ertmanis	

== October–December ==
Opening		Title	Production company	Cast and crew	Ref.
O C T O B E R	6	An Innocent Man	Touchstone Pictures / Silver Screen Partners / Interscope Communications	Peter Yates (director); Larry Brothers (screenplay); Tom Selleck, F. Murray Abraham, Laila Robins, David Rasche, Richard Young, Badja Djola, Bruce A. Young, Dennis Burkley, Todd Graff, M. C. Gainey, Tobin Bell, Maggie Baird, Lt. Mike Budge, Peter Van Norden, James T. Morris	
O C T O B E R	6	Old Gringo	Columbia Pictures	Luis Prenzo (director); William M. Anderson, Glenn Farr, Juan Carlos Macías (screenplay); Jane Fonda, Gregory Peck, Jimmy Smits, Patricio Contreras, Jenny Gago, Gabriela Roel, Jim Metzler, Anne Pitoniak, Pedro Armendáriz Jr., Pedro Damián, Sergio Calderón, Guillermo Ríos, Samuel Valadez De La Torre	
O C T O B E R	12	Puppet Master	Paramount Home Video / Full Moon Pictures	David Schmoeller (director/screenplay); Charles Band, Kenneth J. Hall (screenplay); Paul Le Mat, Jimmie F. Skaggs, William Hickey, Irene Miracle, Mews Small, Barbara Crampton, Robin Frates, Matt Roe, Kathryn O'Reilly, David Boyd, Peter Frankland, Andrew Kimbrough	
O C T O B E R	13	Breaking In	The Samuel Goldwyn Company / Act III Communications	Bill Forsyth (director); John Sayles (screenplay); Burt Reynolds, Casey Siemaszko, Lorraine Toussaint, Sheila Kelley, Albert Salmi, Harry Carey, Maury Chaykin, Stephen Tobolowsky	
O C T O B E R	13	Crimes and Misdemeanors	Orion Pictures	Woody Allen (director/screenplay); Martin Landau, Woody Allen, Mia Farrow, Anjelica Huston, Alan Alda, Jerry Orbach, Joanna Gleason, Claire Bloom, Sam Waterston, Caroline Aaron, Martin S. Bergmann, Frances Conroy, Daryl Hannah, Nora Ephron, Jenny Nichols, Zina Jasper	
O C T O B E R	13	The Fabulous Baker Boys	20th Century Fox / Gladden Entertainment / Mirage Enterprises	Steve Kloves (director/screenplay); Jeff Bridges, Michelle Pfeiffer, Beau Bridges, Ellie Raab, Xander Berkeley, Jennifer Tilly, Dakin Matthews, Ken Lerner, Albert Hall, Terri Treas, Gregory Itzin, Bradford English, David Coburn	
O C T O B E R	13	Halloween 5: The Revenge of Michael Myers	Galaxy International / 20th Century Fox / Compass International Pictures	Dominique Othenin-Girard (director/screenplay); Michael Jacobs, Shem Bitterman (screenplay); Donald Pleasence, Danielle Harris, Ellie Cornell, Beau Starr, Wendy Kaplan, Tamara Glynn, Matthew Walker, Troy Evans, Don Shanks, Jeffrey Landman, Jonathan Chapin, Betty Carvalho, Max Robinson, Frank Como, David Ursin	
O C T O B E R	13	I, Madman	Trans World Entertainment	Tibor Takács (director); David Chaskin (screenplay); Jenny Wright, Clayton Rohner, Randall William Cook, Stephanie Hodge, Bob Frank, Bruce Wagner, Michelle Jordan, Vance Valencia, Mary Baldwin, Rafael Nazario	
O C T O B E R	13	Look Who's Talking	Tri-Star Pictures / Management Company Entertainment Group	Amy Heckerling (director/screenplay); John Travolta, Kirstie Alley, Olympia Dukakis, George Segal, Abe Vigoda, Bruce Willis, Twink Caplan, Joy Boushel, Joan Rivers, Don S. Davis, William B. Davis, Jerry Wasserman, Neal Israel	
O C T O B E R	20	Drugstore Cowboy	Avenue Pictures	Gus Van Sant (director/screenplay); Daniel Yost (screenplay); Matt Dillon, Kelly Lynch, James Remar, James LeGros, Heather Graham, William S. Burroughs, Max Perlich, Grace Zabriskie	
O C T O B E R	20	Fat Man and Little Boy	Paramount Pictures	Roland Joffé (director/screenplay); Bruce Robinson (screenplay); Paul Newman, Dwight Schultz, Bonnie Bedelia, John Cusack, Laura Dern, John C. McGinley, Natasha Richardson, Fred Dalton Thompson, Ron Vawter, Del Close, John Considine, Allan Corduner, Todd Field, Ed Lauter, Gerald Hiken, James Eckhouse, Mary Pat Gleason, Clark Gregg, Péter Halász, Robert Peter Gale, Ron Frazier, Michael Brockman, Franco Cutietta, Joe D'Angerio, Jon DeVries	
O C T O B E R	20	Gross Anatomy	Touchstone Pictures / Silver Screen Partners / Sandollar Productions	Thom Eberhardt (director); Ron Nyswaner, Mark Spragg, Howard Rosenman, Alan Jay Glueckman, Stanley Isaacs (screenplay); Matthew Modine, Daphne Zuniga, Christine Lahti, Todd Field, Robert Desiderio, Zakes Mokae, John Scott Clough, Alice Carter, Ryan Cash	
O C T O B E R	20	Next of Kin	Warner Bros. Pictures / Lorimar Film Entertainment / Barry & Enright Productions	John Irvin (director); Michael Jenning (screenplay); Patrick Swayze, Liam Neeson, Adam Baldwin, Helen Hunt, Bill Paxton, Ben Stiller, Andreas Katsulas, Michael J. Pollard, Ted Levine, Del Close, Paul Greco, Paul Herman, Valentino Cimo, Vincent Guastaferro, Starla Fugate	
O C T O B E R	20	When the Whales Came	20th Century Fox	Clive Rees (director); Michael Morpurgo (screenplay); Helen Mirren, Paul Scofield, David Suchet, Barbara Jefford, David Threlfall, John Hallam, Barbara Ewing, Jeremy Kemp, Dexter Fletcher, Nicholas Jones, Helen Pearce, Max Rennie	
O C T O B E R	27	The Bear	AMLF	Jean-Jacques Annaud (director); Gerard Brach (screenplay); Tchéky Karyo, Jack Wallace, Andre Lacombe, Bart the Bear	
O C T O B E R	27	Immediate Family	Columbia Pictures	Jonathan Kaplan (director); Barbara Benedek (screenplay); Glenn Close, James Woods, Mary Stuart Masterson, Kevin Dillon, Linda Darlow, Harrison Mohr, Mimi Kennedy, Charles Levin, Jessica James, Ken Lerner, Jane Greer	
O C T O B E R	27	Dad	Universal Pictures / Amblin Entertainment	Gary David Goldberg (director/screenplay); Jack Lemmon, Ted Danson, Ethan Hawke, Olympia Dukakis, Kathy Baker, Kevin Spacey, Zakes Mokae, J. T. Walsh, Chris Lemmon, Sprague Grayden, Justin Peterson, Gina Raymond	
O C T O B E R	27	Shocker	Universal Pictures / Carolco Pictures	Wes Craven (director/screenplay); Michael Murphy, Peter Berg, Mitch Pileggi, Cami Cooper, Sam Scarber, Richard Brooks, Vincent Guastaferro, Ted Raimi, Heather Langenkamp, Dr. Timothy Leary, Kane Roberts, Wes Craven, Jessica Craven, Jonathan Craven, John Tesh, Bingham Ray, Eugene Chadbourne, Bruce Wagner, Michael Matthews, Ernie Lively, Lindsay Parker, Stephen R. Hudis, Alice Cooper, Boris Karloff, Brent Spiner	
O C T O B E R	27	Worth Winning	20th Century Fox	Will Mackenzie (director); Josann McGibbon, Sara Parriott (screenplay); Mark Harmon, Madeleine Stowe, Lesley Ann Warren, Maria Holvöe, Mark Blum, Andrea Martin, Tony Longo, Alan Blumenfeld, Brad Hall, Jon Korkes, Arthur Malet, Joan Severance, David Brenner, Devin Ratray	
O C T O B E R	28	Perfect Witness	HBO Pictures / Granger Productions	Robert Mandel (director); Terry Curtis Fox, Ron Hutchinson (screenplay); Brian Dennehy, Aidan Quinn, Stockard Channing, Laura Harrington, Delroy Lindo, Joe Grifasi, Ken Pogue, Markus Flanagan, David Margulies, Colm Meaney, Tobin Bell, Tony Sirico, David Proval, Nial Lancaster, James Greene, Sam Malkin, Kevin Rushton, David Cumming, Christopher Trace, David Christopher Adamson, Jennifer Pearson	
N O V E M B E R	3	Bloodhounds of Broadway	Columbia Pictures	Howard Brookner (director/screenplay); Colman deKay (screenplay); Damon Runyon (stories); Matt Dillon, Jennifer Grey, Julie Hagerty, Rutger Hauer, Madonna, Esai Morales, Anita Morris, Randy Quaid, Josef Sommer, Steve Buscemi, Fisher Stevens, Alan Ruck, Dinah Manoff, Ethan Phillips, Tony Longo, Stephen McHattie, Louis Zorich, Richard Edson, Howard Brookner, John Rothman, Mark Nelson, Madeleine Potter, Gerry Bamman, Jane Brucker, Googy Gress, Robert Donley, William S. Burroughs, Michael Wincott, Herschel Sparber, Black-Eyed Susan, Tamara Tunie, Sara Driver, Leonard Termo	
N O V E M B E R	3	Dealers	Skouras Pictures / J. Arthur Rank Film Distributors / Euston Films / Rank Organisation	Colin Bucksey (director); Andrew Maclear (screenplay); Paul McGann, Rebecca De Mornay, Derrick O'Connor, John Castle, Paul Guilfoyle, Rosalind Bennett, Adrian Dunbar, Nicholas Hewetson, Sara Sugarman, Douglas Hodge, Annabel Brooks, Simon Slater, Richenda Carey, Beverly Hills	
N O V E M B E R	3	Limit Up	MCEG/Virgin	Richard Martini (director/screenplay); Luana Anders (screenplay); Nancy Allen, Dean Stockwell, Brad Hall, Danitra Vance, Ray Charles, Rance Howard, Sally Kellerman, Sandra Bogan, William J. Wolf, Ava Fabian, Robbie Martini, Teressa Ovetta Burrell, Winifred Freedman, Kellie Joy Beals, Nicky Blair	
N O V E M B E R	3	The Phantom of the Opera	21st Century Film Corporation	Dwight H. Little (director); Gerry O'Hara, Duke Sandefur (screenplay); Robert Englund, Jill Schoelen, Alex Hyde-White, Bill Nighy, Terence Harvey, Stephanie Lawrence, Molly Shannon, Terence Beesley, Mark Ryan, Emma Rawson, Nathan Lewis, Peter Clapham, Yehuda Efroni, Nancy Fontana	
N O V E M B E R	3	Second Sight	Warner Bros. Pictures	Joel Zwick (director); Tom Schulman, Patricia Resnick (screenplay); John Larroquette, Bronson Pinchot, Bess Armstrong, Stuart Pankin, John Schuck, James Tolkan, Will Le Bow, Christine Estabrook, Marisol Massey, William Prince, Dominic Chianese, Michael Lombard, Adam LeFevre, Ron Taylor, Andrew Mutnick, Lucy Johnson, Michelle Fortune	
N O V E M B E R	3	Stepfather II	ITC Entertainment / Millimeter Films	Jeff Burr (director); John Auerbach (screenplay); Terry O'Quinn, Meg Foster, Caroline Williams, Jonathan Brandis, Henry Brown, Mitchell Laurance, Miriam Byrd-Nethery, Leon Martell, Renata Scott, John O'Leary, Glen Adams, Eric Brown, Bob Gray, Rosemary Welden	
N O V E M B E R	8	Henry V	The Samuel Goldwyn Company / BBC Films	Kenneth Branagh (director/screenplay); Kenneth Branagh, Paul Scofield, Derek Jacobi, Ian Holm, Emma Thompson, Alec McCowen, Judi Dench, Christian Bale, James Larkin, Simon Shepherd, Brian Blessed, Charles Kay, Nicholas Ferguson, Edward Jewesbury, Danny Webb, Ian Holm, Jimmy Yuill, John Sessions, Shaun Prendergast, Patrick Doyle, Michael Williams, Robbie Coltrane, Richard Briers, Geoffrey Hutchings, Robert Stephens, Michael Maloney, Nigel Greaves, Harold Innocent, Richard Easton, Colin Hurley, Geraldine McEwan, David Lloyd Meredith, Christopher Ravenscroft, David Parfitt, James Simmons, Paul Gregory, Tom Whitehouse, Fabian Cartwright, Stephen Simms, Jay Villiers, Richard Clifford, Julian Gartside	
N O V E M B E R	10	Best of the Best	Taurus Entertainment	Bob Radler (director); Paul Levine (screenplay); Eric Roberts, James Earl Jones, Sally Kirkland, Phillip Rhee, John P. Ryan, John Dye, Tom Everett, Louise Fletcher, Chris Penn, Edan Gross, Hee Il Cho, James Lew, Ahmad Rashad, David Agresta, Simon Rhee, Ken Nagayama, Ho Sik Pak, Dae Kyu Chang, Emilie Hagen	
N O V E M B E R	10	Communion	New Line Cinema	Philippe Mora (director); Whitley Strieber (screenplay); Christopher Walken, Lindsay Crouse, Frances Sternhagen, Andreas Katsulas, Terry Hanauer, Joel Carlson	
N O V E M B E R	10	My Left Foot	Palace Pictures	Jim Sheridan (director/screenplay); Shane Connaughton (screenplay); Daniel Day-Lewis, Ray McAnally, Brenda Fricker, Fiona Shaw, Kirsten Sheridan, Cyril Cusack, Phelim Drew, Eileen Colgan, Adrian Dunbar, Alison Whelan, Eanna MacLiam, Declan Croghan, Marie Conremme, Ruth McCabe	
N O V E M B E R	10	Staying Together	Hemdale Film Corporation	Lee Grant (director); Monte Merrick (screenplay); Sean Astin, Stockard Channing, Melinda Dillon, Levon Helm, Dermot Mulroney, Daphne Zuniga, Dinah Manoff, Jim Haynie, Tim Quill, Keith Szarabajka, Sheila Kelley, Ryan Hill, Rick Marshall	
N O V E M B E R	15	Steel Magnolias	Tri-Star Pictures / Rastar Productions	Herbert Ross (director); Robert Harling (screenplay); Sally Field, Dolly Parton, Shirley MacLaine, Daryl Hannah, Olympia Dukakis, Julia Roberts, Tom Skerritt, Dylan McDermott, Kevin J. O'Connor, Sam Shepard, Bill McCutcheon, Jonathan Ward, Knowl Johnson, Ann Wedgeworth, Bibi Besch, Janine Turner, James Wlcek, Tom Hodges, Ronald Young, C. Houser, Daniel Camp, Norman Fletcher	
N O V E M B E R	17	All Dogs Go to Heaven	United Artists / Sullivan Bluth Studios	Don Bluth (director); David N. Weiss (screenplay); Burt Reynolds, Dom DeLuise, Judith Barsi, Vic Tayback, Charles Nelson Reilly, Loni Anderson, Melba Moore, Ken Page, Rob Fuller, Earleen Carey, Godfrey Quigley, Anna Manahan, Candy Devine, Dan Kuenster, David N. Weiss, Charlie Adler, Jack Angel, Nancy Cartwright, Philip L. Clarke, Patrick Pinney, Laura Summer, Nigel Pegram, Jay Stevens, Kelly Briley, Cyndi Cozzo, Thomas Durkin, Dana Rifkin, Daryl Gilley, John Carr, John Eddings, Jeff Etter, T. Dan Hofstedt, Dan Molina, Mark Swan, Taylor Swanson, Dick Zondag, Anaida R. Garcia	
N O V E M B E R	17	Harlem Nights	Paramount Pictures	Eddie Murphy (director/screenplay); Eddie Murphy, Richard Pryor, Redd Foxx, Danny Aiello, Michael Lerner, Della Reese, Berlinda Tolbert, Stan Shaw, Jasmine Guy, Vic Polizos, Lela Rochon, David Marciano, Arsenio Hall, Thomas Mikal Ford, Miguel A. Núñez Jr., Charlie Murphy, Robin Harris, Michael Buffer, Reynaldo Rey, Ji-Tu Cumbuka, Desi Arnaz Hines II, Uncle Ray Murphy, Don Familton	
N O V E M B E R	17	The Little Mermaid	Walt Disney Pictures	Ron Clements, John Musker (directors/screenplay); Jodi Benson, Christopher Daniel Barnes, Pat Carroll, Samuel E. Wright, Jason Marin, Kenneth Mars, Buddy Hackett, Paddi Edwards, Ben Wright, Edie McClurg, Kimmy Robertson, Caroline Vasicek, Will Ryan, René Auberjonois, Gerrit Graham, J.D. Daniels, Rod McKuen, Malachi Pearson, Frank Welker, Jim Cummings, Hamilton Camp, Debbie Shapiro, Ed Gilbert, Charlie Adler, Jack Angel, Steve Bulen, Nancy Cartwright, Philip L. Clarke, Jennifer Darling, Gail Farrell, Donny Gerrard, Phillip Ingram, Anne Lockhart, Sherry Lynn, Patrick Pinney, Sally Stevens, Jackie Ward	
N O V E M B E R	17	Mystery Train	Orion Classics	Jim Jarmusch (director/screenplay); Youki Kudoh, Masatoshi Nagase, Screamin' Jay Hawkins, Cinque Lee, Rufus Thomas, Jodie Markell, Nicoletta Braschi, Elizabeth Bracco, Sy Richardson, Tom Noonan, Joe Strummer, Rick Aviles, Steve Buscemi, Vondie Curtis-Hall, Tom Waits	
N O V E M B E R	17	Prancer	Orion Pictures / Nelson Entertainment / Cineplex Odeon Films	John D. Hancock (director); Greg Taylor (screenplay); Sam Elliott, Cloris Leachman, Abe Vigoda, Michael Constantine, Ariana Richards, Rebecca Harrell, John Joseph Duda, Johnny Galecki, Rutanya Alda, Mark Rolston, Walter Charles, Michael Luciano, Jesse Bradford, Sandra Olson, Dan Atherton, Boo	
N O V E M B E R	17	Valmont	Orion Pictures	Miloš Forman (director/screenplay); Jean-Claude Carrière (screenplay); Colin Firth, Annette Bening, Meg Tilly, Fairuza Balk, Siân Phillips, Jeffrey Jones, Henry Thomas, Fabia Drake, T. P. McKenna, Isla Blair, Ian McNeice, Aleta Mitchell, Ronald Lacey, Vincent Schiavelli, Sandrine Dumas	
N O V E M B E R	22	Back to the Future Part II	Universal Pictures / Amblin Entertainment	Robert Zemeckis (director); Bob Gale (screenplay); Michael J. Fox, Christopher Lloyd, Thomas F. Wilson, Lea Thompson, Elisabeth Shue, James Tolkan, Jeffrey Weissman, Casey Siemaszko, Billy Zane, J. J. Cohen, Charles Fleischer, Ricky Dean Logan, Darlene Vogel, Jason Scott Lee, Flea, Buck Flower, Neil Ross, John Erwin, Harry Waters Jr., Wesley Mann, Joe Flaherty, Elijah Wood, Crispin Glover, Donald Fullilove, Marc McClure, Mary Ellen Trainor, Gian Maria Volonté	
N O V E M B E R	25	Red King, White Knight	HBO Pictures / Zenith Entertainment / Citadel Entertainment	Geoff Murphy (director); Ron Hutchinson (screenplay); Tom Skerritt, Max von Sydow, Helen Mirren, Tom Bell, Gavan O'Herlihy, Barry Corbin, Clarke Peters, Lou Hirsch, Kerry Shale, David de Keyser, Kenneth Nelson, Shane Rimmer, Garrick Hagon	
D E C E M B E R	1	Homer and Eddie	Skouras Pictures / Kings Road Entertainment	Andrei Konchalovsky (director); Patrick Cirillo (screenplay); Jim Belushi, Whoopi Goldberg, Karen Black, Anne Ramsey, Beah Richards, John Waters, Mickey Jones, Tad Horino, Vincent Schiavelli, Fritz Feld, Tracey Walter, Robert Glaudini, Pruitt Taylor Vince, Tommy "Tiny" Lister Jr., Mae Mercer, Pat Ast, Nick LaTour, Angelyne, Jimmie F. Skaggs, Nancy Parsons, Sasha Barrese, Elena Koreneva, Barbara Pilavin, Angelo Bertolini	
D E C E M B E R	1	National Lampoon's Christmas Vacation	Warner Bros. Pictures / Hughes Entertainment	Jeremiah S. Chechik (director); John Hughes (screenplay); Chevy Chase, Beverly D'Angelo, Randy Quaid, Juliette Lewis, Johnny Galecki, John Randolph, Diane Ladd, E. G. Marshall, Doris Roberts, Miriam Flynn, William Hickey, Mae Questel, Sam McMurray, Julia Louis-Dreyfus, Brian Doyle-Murray, Ellen Hamilton Latzen, Cody Burger, Nicholas Guest, Natalia Nogulich, Nicolette Scorsese, Alexander Folk, Doug Llewelyn	
D E C E M B E R	8	She-Devil	Orion Pictures	Susan Seidelman (director); Barry Strugatz, Mark R. Burns (screenplay); Meryl Streep, Roseanne Barr, Ed Begley Jr., Sylvia Miles, Linda Hunt, A Martinez, Maria Pitillo, Mary Louise Wilson, Susan Willis, Jack Gilpin, Robin Leach, June Gable, Rosanna Carter, Lori Tan Chinn, Sally Jessy Raphael, Elisebeth Peters, Bryan Larkin, Nitchie Barrett	
D E C E M B E R	8	Triumph of the Spirit	Triumph Releasing Corporation	Robert M. Young (director); Andrzej Krakowski, Laurence Heath (screenplay); Willem Dafoe, Edward James Olmos, Robert Loggia	
D E C E M B E R	8	The War of the Roses	20th Century Fox / Gracie Films	Danny DeVito (director); Michael J. Leeson (screenplay); Michael Douglas, Kathleen Turner, Danny DeVito, Marianne Sägebrecht, Sean Astin, Heather Fairfield, G. D. Spradlin, Peter Donat, Dan Castellaneta, Shirley Mitchell, Ellen Crawford, Vickilyn Reynolds, Roy Brocksmith, Peter Hansen, Robert Harper, Danitra Vance, David Wohl	
D E C E M B E R	13	Enemies, A Love Story	20th Century Fox	Paul Mazursky, (director/screenplay); Roger L. Simon (screenplay); Ron Silver, Anjelica Huston, Lena Olin, Margaret Sophie Stein, Alan King, Judith Malina, Elya Baskin, Paul Mazursky, Phil Leeds, Rita Karin, Zypora Spaisman	
D E C E M B E R	13	New Year's Day	Rainbow Releasing	Henry Jaglom (director/screenplay); David Duchovny, Maggie Wheeler, Gwen Welles, Melanie Winter, Henry Jaglom, Miloš Forman, Tracy Reiner, Michael Emil	
D E C E M B E R	15	Blaze	Touchstone Pictures / A&M Films	Ron Shelton (director/screenplay); Paul Newman, Lolita Davidovich, Jerry Hardin, Gailard Sartain, Jeffrey DeMunn, Richard Jenkins, Jay Chevalier, Robert Wuhl, Eloy Casados, James Harper, Blaze Starr, Gilbert Lewis, Gary Anthony Sturgis, Emily Warfield, King Cotton, Brad Leland, Garland Bunting, Brandon Smith, Michael Brockman, Teresa Gilmore, Dianne Brill, Louanne Stephens, Harlan Jordan	
D E C E M B E R	15	Driving Miss Daisy	Warner Bros. Pictures / The Zanuck Company	Bruce Beresford (director); Alfred Uhry (screenplay); Morgan Freeman, Jessica Tandy, Dan Aykroyd, Patti LuPone, Esther Rolle, Jo Ann Havrilla, William Hall Jr., Ray McKinnon, Alvin M. Sugarman, Clarice F. Geigerman, Muriel Moore, Sylvia Kaler, Crystal R. Fox, Bob Hannah	
D E C E M B E R	15	Family Business	Tri-Star Pictures	Sidney Lumet (director); Vincent Patrick (screenplay); Sean Connery, Dustin Hoffman, Matthew Broderick, Rosanna DeSoto, Janet Carroll, Victoria Jackson, Bill McCutcheon, Deborah Rush, B.D. Wong, John Capodice, Joe Lisi, Luis Guzmán, James Tolkan, Thomas A. Carlin, Rex Everhart, Tony DiBenedetto, Ed Crowley, Aideen O'Kelly	
D E C E M B E R	15	Glory	Tri-Star Pictures	Edward Zwick (director); Kevin Jarre (screenplay); Matthew Broderick, Denzel Washington, Cary Elwes, Morgan Freeman, Cliff DeYoung, Andre Braugher, Jihmi Kennedy, Alan North, John Finn, RonReaco Lee, Donovan Leitch, Bob Gunton, Jay O. Sanders, Raymond St. Jacques, Richard Riehle, JD Cullum, Christian Baskous, Peter Michael Goetz, Jane Alexander	
D E C E M B E R	15	We're No Angels	Paramount Pictures	Neil Jordan (director); David Mamet (screenplay); Robert De Niro, Sean Penn, Demi Moore, Hoyt Axton, Bruno Kirby, Ray McAnally, James Russo, Wallace Shawn, John C. Reilly, Jay Brazeau, Elizabeth Lawrence, Frank C. Turner, Matthew Walker, Richard Newman, Karen Austin, Antony Holland, Garwin Sanford, Gerry Bean	
D E C E M B E R	15	The Wizard	Universal Pictures	Todd Holland (director); David Chisholm (screenplay); Fred Savage, Luke Edwards, Jenny Lewis, Beau Bridges, Christian Slater, Will Seltzer, Jackey Vinson, Wendy Phillips, Sam McMurray, Frank McRae, Vincent Leahr, Beth Grant, Lee Arenberg, Tobey Maguire, Dante Basco	
D E C E M B E R	16	Age-Old Friends	HBO Pictures / Granger Productions	Allan Kroeker (director); Bob Larbey (screenplay); Hume Cronyn, Vincent Gardenia, Tandy Cronyn, Barry Flatman, Michele Scarabelli, Esther Rolle, Aaron Schwartz, Murray Westgate	
D E C E M B E R	20	Born on the Fourth of July	Universal Pictures	Oliver Stone (director/screenplay); Ron Kovic (screenplay); Tom Cruise, Kyra Sedgwick, Raymond J. Barry, Jerry Levine, Frank Whaley, Willem Dafoe, Caroline Kava, Josh Evans, Stephen Baldwin, Sean Stone, Anne Bobby, Jenna von Oÿ, John Getz, David Warshofsky, Jason Gedrick, Bill Allen, William Baldwin, James LeGros, William Mapother, Markus Flanagan, R. D. Call, Don "The Dragon" Wilson, Jessica Prunell, Tom Berenger, Mel Allen, Ed Lauter, Oliver Stone, Dale Dye, Rocky Carroll, Chris Pedersen, David Herman, Damien Leake, Norman D. Wilson, Richard Poe, Bob Gunton, Vivica A. Fox, Mark Moses, Abbie Hoffman, Jake Weber, Reg E. Cathey, Edie Brickell, Tom Sizemore, Andrew Lauer, Michael Wincott, Anthony Pena, Holly Marie Combs, Mike Starr, Beau Starr, Tony Frank, Lili Taylor, Peter Crombie, Eagle Eye Cherry, Brian Tarantina, Jack McGee, Jodi Long, Michelle Hurst, John C. McGinley, Wayne Knight, Elizabeth Hoffman, Lucinda Jenney, Annie McEnroe, Daniel Baldwin, Samantha Larkin, Kevin Harvey Morse, Jason Klein, Lane R. Davis, Richard Panebianco, Johnny Pinto, Rob Camilletti, J. R. Nutt, Philip Amelio, Michael McTighe, Cody Beard, Corkey Ford, Billie Neal, Jayne Haynes	
D E C E M B E R	20	Roger & Me	Warner Bros. Pictures / Dog Eat Dog Films	Michael Moore (director/screenplay); Michael Moore, Roger Smith	
D E C E M B E R	21	Camille Claudel	Gaumont	Bruno Nuytten (director/screenplay); Marilyn Goldin (screenplay); Isabelle Adjani, Gérard Depardieu, Laurent Grévill, Alain Cuny, Madeleine Robinson, Philippe Clévenot, Katrine Boorman, Maxime Leroux, Danièle Lebrun, François Berléand	
D E C E M B E R	22	Always	Universal Pictures / United Artists / Amblin Entertainment	Steven Spielberg (director); Jerry Belson, Diane Thomas (screenplay); Richard Dreyfuss, Holly Hunter, John Goodman, Brad Johnson, Audrey Hepburn, Roberts Blossom, Keith David, Marg Helgenberger, Dale Dye, Doug McGrath, Ed Van Nuys, Brian Haley, James Lashly, Michael Steve Jones	
D E C E M B E R	22	Music Box	Tri-Star Pictures / Carolco Pictures	Costa-Gavras (director); Joe Eszterhas (screenplay); Jessica Lange, Armin Mueller-Stahl, Frederic Forrest, Donald Moffat, Lukas Haas, Mari Törőcsik, Elżbieta Czyżewska, James Zagel, Michael Rooker, Cheryl Lynn Bruce, Albert Hall, Ned Schmidtke, Margo Winkler, Larry Brandenburg, Ralph Foody, Zoltán Gera	
D E C E M B E R	22	Tango & Cash	Warner Bros. Pictures	Andrei Konchalovsky (director); Randy Feldman (screenplay); Sylvester Stallone, Kurt Russell, Jack Palance, Teri Hatcher, Brion James, Geoffrey Lewis, Eddie Bunker, James Hong, Marc Alaimo, Michael J. Pollard, Michael Jeter, Robert Z'Dar, Lewis Arquette, Roy Brocksmith, Richard Fancy, Phil Rubenstein, Clint Howard, Benny Urquidez, Billy Blanks, Kristen Dalton, Dale Swann, Glenn Morshower, Bing Russell, Elizabeth Sung, Andre Rosey Brown, Savely Kramarov, Patti Davis, Roxanne Kernohan, Adolfo 'Shabba-Doo' Quinones, Rodney Saulsberry	

== See also ==
- List of 1989 box office number-one films in the United States
- 1989 in the United States
