= Fred Shay =

Fred Shay may refer to:

- Fred Shay, character in Lost Angels
- Fred Shay, character in Suburgatory
