= Beautiful Joe (film) =

- Directed by: Stephen Metcalfe
- Written by: Stephen Metcalfe
- Produced by: Fred Fuchs; Steven Haft
- Starring: Sharon Stone; Billy Connolly
- Cinematography: Thomas Ackerman
- Music by: John Altman
- Production companies: Stratosphere Entertainment; Haft Entertainment; Pacific Motion Pictures
- Distributed by: Lions Gate Films (United States); Metrodome Distribution (United Kingdom); Capitol Films (Overseas)
- Release date: June 9, 2000
- Running time: 98 minutes
- Countries: United States; United Kingdom
- Language: English
- Budget: $15 million

Beautiful Joe is a 2000 American-British film written and directed by Stephen Metcalfe. It stars Sharon Stone and Billy Connolly, with supporting roles by Ian Holm, Dann Florek, and Gil Bellows.

== Cast ==
- Sharon Stone as Alice "Hush" Mason
- Billy Connolly as Joe
- Gil Bellows as Elton
- Jurnee Smollett as Vivien
- Dillon Moen as Lee
- Jaimz Woolvett as "Mouse"
- Alan C. Peterson as "Howdy"
- Dann Florek as "Happy"
- Ian Holm as George "The Geek"
- Sheila Paterson as Mrs. O'Malley
- Frank C. Turner as Frank
- Gina Chiarelli as Pauline
- Ben Johnson as Gino
- Connor Widdows as Anthony
- Norman Armour as Doctor
- J.K. Simmons (uncredited)

== Production ==
In October 1998, actress Sharon Stone stated that Beautiful Joe would be her next project, saying she had read the script while visiting her father, Joe, in a hospital. Stone said production would take place in San Francisco, where she lived. Filming instead took place in Vancouver, British Columbia, and began in June 1999. Filming in British Columbia was initially scheduled to last from June 28 to August 17. The film's budget was $15 million, and filming took place in British Columbia because of various economic incentives, which saved the production $1.5 million.

Although the film was partially set in Louisville, Kentucky, it would not feature any scenes shot there, with the possible exception of stock footage for outdoor shots. During July 1999, filming took place at Hastings Racecourse, a horse-racing track located at Vancouver's Hastings Park. For the film, the Hastings race track was transformed to portray the Churchill Downs horse track in Louisville. The scene included approximately 800 extras who cheered from the track's grandstand.

In August 1999, Stone's husband, Phil Bronstein, had a heart attack and she returned to San Francisco to be with him. Stone's departure caused production to stop for two days, and for the following three days, director Stephen Metcalfe shot scenes that did not involve her character. Stone returned to the film set a week after Bronstein's heart attack and angioplasty. Production was expected to wrap on August 19, 1999, as scheduled, or possibly a day later. Gil Bellows said about the film, "It was one of those experiences that doesn't end the way one intends. I'd rather not talk about it."

The film was produced by Fred Fuchs and Steven Haft, and financed by London-based Capitol Films. During production, Capitol Films entered an agreement with Carl Icahn's Stratosphere Entertainment, which was to distribute the film in the United States.

== Release ==
Beautiful Joe was never released in American theaters. In the United States, the film premiered on the Cinemax cable network on November 19, 2000, and was released on VHS and DVD on May 22, 2001.

== Reception ==
The A.V. Club's Nathan Rabin, who was critical of Stone's previous films, wrote that "nothing she's done has been quite as shameless or appalling as Beautiful Joe, a toxic piece of whimsy that ranks among the worst films of 2000." On Rotten Tomatoes, the film has an aggregated score of 60% based on 3 positive and 2 negative reviews.
