= Her Alibi =

1989 film by Bruce Beresford

- Theatrical release poster
- Directed by: Bruce Beresford
- Written by: Charlie Peters
- Produced by: Keith Barish
- Starring: Tom Selleck; Paulina Porizkova; William Daniels; James Farentino
- Cinematography: Freddie Francis
- Edited by: Anne Goursaud
- Music by: Georges Delerue
- Distributed by: Warner Bros. Pictures
- Release date: February 3, 1989
- Running time: 94 minutes
- Country: United States
- Languages: English; Romanian
- Budget: $15 million
- Box office: $18 million

Her Alibi is a 1989 American romantic comedy film directed by Bruce Beresford, written by Charlie Peters and starring Tom Selleck, Paulina Porizkova, William Daniels and James Farentino.

== Plot ==
Phil Blackwood is an American mystery novelist who has fallen into a rut with predictable plots and declining sales. He is floundering attempting to write a new novel, well behind schedule, and wastes time watching trials in court, where he is known as a regular among other spectators.

Blackwood is stunned when he sees a dazzling Romanian murder suspect named Nina Ionescu arraigned in the court. Instantly falling for her, he believes she cannot possibly be a murderer. To assure himself of this, he poses as a Roman Catholic priest in order to meet Nina while she is held pending her bail appearance. Finding her wearing a crucifix necklace (which would be forbidden in her communist homeland), he thinks she is innocent when she does not confess to the murder.

With the help of his friend and literary agent, Sam, Blackwood invents an alibi that they are having an affair to secure her release under his custody. However, after Blackwood succeeds in this, Sam raises the frightening idea that she really might be a murderer, and that Blackwood might be in danger.

Blackwood takes Nina to live under supervision in his house. However, he now finds himself alternatively entranced with her and terrified of her, as he finds himself wondering if she really could be a murderer. She is extraordinarily proficient with throwing knives, as he finds when she kills a large insect that was very close to him. An incident occurs where she shoots his buttocks with an arrow, saying it was an accident. She makes mysterious phone calls that he overhears. He becomes so afraid that he decides to barricade his bedroom door with furniture, saying it is part of his exercise regimen.

There are plots going on around Blackwood that he does not understand, as the real murderers (operatives from Romania's Securitate), are attempting to kidnap Nina. She, too, has her own agenda of arranging the defection of her family to America. Blackwood is stumbling through all of this, as he is inspired to write scenes involving her and his series hero, but expressing the reality of both his attraction to her and his doubts and fears about her in the storyline.

Nina has had doubts about Blackwood since he suddenly appeared to help her. She eventually finds his manuscript in his office and reads it, and she becomes aware of his feelings and doubts. She is dismayed by his lack of faith in her, since she has begun to truly appreciate him. She runs away to be at The Funeral of Grimaldi, an event held by clowns to celebrate the life of the famous clown Joseph Grimaldi. Romanian agents attempt to grab her, Blackwood rushes to protect her, and her plans to defect all come to a head. Nina and her family successfully defect, Blackwood's book, Her Alibi, is published to great success and Blackwood and Nina get together.

== Cast ==
- Tom Selleck as Phil Blackwood
- Paulina Porizkova as Nina Ionescu
- William Daniels as Sam
- James Farentino as Frank Polito
- Hurd Hatfield as Troppa
- Ronald Guttman as Lucy Comanescu
- Victor Argo as Avram
- Patrick Wayne as Gary Blackwood
- Tess Harper as Sally Blackwood
- Bill Smitrovich as Craig Farrell
- Bobo Lewis as Rose
- Joan Copeland as Audrey
- Liliana Komorowska as Laura
- Ted Sutton as Cop
- Nat Benchley as Prosecutor
- Jo Ann Havrilla as Lecture Woman
- Mark Stolzenberg as Clown

== Reception ==
The film was met with negative reviews. On Rotten Tomatoes, it has an approval rating of 17% based on reviews from 23 critics. On Metacritic, it has a score of 24% based on reviews from 15 critics, indicating "generally unfavorable" reviews.

Paulina Porizkova was nominated for Golden Raspberry Award for Worst Actress at the 10th Golden Raspberry Awards in 1990.
