= My Two Loves =

1986 film directed by Noel Black

- ABC promotional image
- Genre: Drama; Romance
- Written by: Rita Mae Brown; Reginald Rose
- Directed by: Noel Black
- Starring: Mariette Hartley; Lynn Redgrave; Barry Newman; Sada Thompson
- Composer: Gary William Friedman
- Country of origin: United States
- Original language: English

Production
- Executive producer: Alvin Cooperman
- Production location: San Antonio
- Cinematography: Arthur Albert
- Running time: 100 minutes
- Production companies: Alvin Cooperman Productions; Taft Entertainment Television

Original release
- Network: ABC
- Release: April 7, 1986

My Two Loves is a 1986 American made-for-television romantic drama film directed by Noel Black starring Mariette Hartley and Lynn Redgrave. It is considered groundbreaking for its portrayal of bisexuality and lesbianism on network television in the United States.

== Plot ==
Gail Springer, a recently widowed single mother, takes a job as a chef. Her late husband's divorced friend Ben is attempting to woo her, but her daughter does not approve. When her boss Marjorie confesses that she is gay, Gail enters into a relationship with her, but Gail's mother does not approve.

== Cast ==
- Mariette Hartley as Gail Springer
- Lynn Redgrave as Marjorie Lloyd
- Barry Newman as Ben
- Sada Thompson as Dorothea
- Sara Inglis as Amy Springer
- Robert Sean Leonard as Larry Taylor
- Eve Roberts as Dr. Hoffman
- Arturo Tamaez as John
- Thee Swan as Martha
- Rachel Fey as Instructress
- Ray Liberto as Melon Seller
- Edwin Neal as Telephone Man
- Diane Perella as Teacher
- Lee Connally as Flower Vendor
- Celia Newman as Cheerleader
- James Patrick Lockett as Man at Zoo
- Travis McGehee as Boy at Zoo

== Production ==
My Two Loves was filmed on location in San Antonio, Texas. When Alvin Cooperman decided to produce it, San Antonio was going to double for St. Louis. After a week Cooperman rewrote the script and made the location San Antonio.

== Broadcast ==
The film aired on ABC at 9:00 p.m. Eastern Time on April 7, 1986.

== Reception ==
Hal Erickson of Allmovie called the film "groundbreaking" and gave it 2.5/5 stars, writing, "What made this film unique (at least when it initially aired over the ABC network on April 7, 1986) is that one of Gail's amours is her late husband's business partner Ben Taylor (Barry Newman)--while the other is Gail's female best friend, Marjorie Lloyd (Lynn Redgrave)." He went on to call the film "Impeccably tasteful in its treatment of a potential volatile subject, and refreshingly honest and uncompromising at its conclusion."

Jeff Jarvis of People gave the film a C−, writing, "This movie deals with just one fact of life: bisexuality." He continued, "Mariette and Lynn are an item, but you’d never know they’re in love from the way they act. There’s no passion between them. There’s no life anywhere in My Two Loves. In the end the movie looks like the life story of mannequins."

== LGBT significance ==
The films significance as an early television portrayal of a lesbian relationship is noted by Gene Elder of outinusa.com, who writes, "This was in January 1986, and at a time when we were still referring to ourselves as the GL community–shortly adding the B to become the GLB community. The T was to come much later."

The Fort Walton Beach Playground Daily News ran an article with the headline "Lynn Redgrave enjoys challenging roles" on Saturday, April 5, 1986. The News-Press of Fort Myers, Florida ran an article with the headline "ABC tackles once-taboo subject of bisexuality" on Sunday, April 6, 1986. Several newspapers ran articles about the film's subject matter. The Dayton Daily News of Dayton, Ohio ran an article with the headline "'My Two Loves' takes lesbianism one step further" on Monday, April 7, 1986.

Admitting that "Television has generally been uneasy about lesbians," John J. O'Connor of The New York Times wrote, "the subject of lesbianism clearly remains delicate, to say the least, for television. In 'My Two Loves,' ... a character contends that lesbians are this country's 'largest invisible minority.' Perhaps with that in mind, 'My Two Loves' approaches the subject with a measure of candor and sympathy and then, in typical television fashion, discreetly withdraws before any difficult decisions have to be made." Praising Hartley and Redgrave, he wrote, "both actresses splendidly transcend the inhibitions of the script and production. Passion between the two women is restricted to rather tentative hugging; ecstasy seems limited to washing each other's hair. Fifteen years ago, 'That Certain Summer' looked at male homosexuals with studied tastefulness and unflagging decorum. Television has finally gotten around to doing the same for lesbians."

In an interview with The Washington Post about her role in the film, Lynn Redgrave said, "I've played a nun, a hooker, a bisexual and a saint. Why should this part be a problem?" When asked what it was like to play a lesbian, she said, "I didn't find it hard. It's fun to play people who are not like yourself."

Admitting that such a role could affect her career, Hartley said, "I think it affected my publicist more than anyone else. She had to call Celestial Seasonings Tea to tell them I was going to play a bisexual. It was a curious feeling to think I could lose my contract by playing a bisexual."

In the book The Prime Time Closet: A History of Gays and Lesbians on TV, author Stephen Tropiano writes, "Lesbianism was also presented as an option for lonely heterosexual women in search of some companionship. In the made-for-TV movie, My Two Loves, widow and single mother Gail Springer (Mariette Hartley) befriends an executive, Marjorie (Lynn Redgrave), who she later discovers is a lesbian. Gail said she had no idea because Marjorie doesn't look gay. 'We don't all wear black leather and ride a Harley Davidson,' Marjorie explains. Their relationship turns into an affair, much to the dismay of Gail's mother (Sada Thompson) and her old friend, Ben (Barry Newman), a male chauvinist who is romantically pursuing her. ... Gail Who must decide between Marjorie and Ben, chooses neither. Again, her choice seems to be between lifestyles, not individuals. Like Gail, television was still not ready to commit either way."

In an obituary of Lynn Redgrave for Ms., Michele Kort wrote, "Outside of her own scripts, Redgrave was gutsy in her choice of roles, including playing a lesbian in a happy (!) relationship with a woman in the 1986 TV film My Two Loves. As I recall, the most intimate moment in the film was a hair-washing scene, but to have any lesbian representation on television back then was an accomplishment."

My Two Loves is noted for its portrayal of a lesbian relationship in the article Flirting with Equality: A Feminist Social Commentary on the Opposition to Civil Equality for Lesbians and Gays by Patricia Madoo Lengermann and Jill Niebrugge in the National Women's Studies Association Journal.

The Ontario Consultants on Religious Tolerance list the film as a "homosexual milestone" in the portrayal of the LGBT community in the media.

Michele Kort of The Advocate called it "groundbreaking but coy."

My Two Loves is included in the list of "Historic LGBTQ Television Moments" by the Association for Lesbian, Gay, Bisexual, and Transgender Issues in Counseling of Alabama (ALGBTICAL).
