= Ted Sutton =

American actor

Ted Sutton is an American actor and voice over artist. He is best known for playing Sergeant Cunningham in M. Night Shyamalan's 2002 film Signs.

== Career ==
Sutton began as a New York actor, but his role in Signs gained him attention, and led to further roles, including guest appearances in 24, Law & Order: SVU, Cold Case, JAG, Charmed, 10-8. He was scheduled to play an Andorian general in theStar Trek: Enterprise episode "Proving Ground" but was replaced by Granville Van Dusen. Sutton played a department store regional manager who took a big cash bribe on The Young and the Restless. Sutton says that role was the most fun he has ever had. He is noted for his distinctive speaking voice. He played a doctor in Clint Eastwood's Million Dollar Baby.

== Filmography ==
Year	Title	Role	Notes
1989	Her Alibi	Cop	
1990	On the Block	Mark	
1991	Maxim Xul	District attorney	
1996	In the Blink of an Eye	Trooper Black	
1997	G.I. Jane	Flag Officer	
1998	Species II	Pentagon Personnel	
2001	Law & Order: Special Victims Unit	Robert	Guest appearance in the episode "Countdown"
2001	Revolution #9	Dr. Fred Lang	Screened at the Mar del Plata Film Festival
2002	Signs	SFC Cunningham	
2003	24	General Blaye	Guest appearance in the episode "Day 2: 1:00am – 2:00am"
2003	Marci X	Chuck Farley	
2004	10-8: Officers on Duty	Male driver	Guest appearance in the episode "Wild and the Innocent"
2004	Passions	Jail guard	Guest appearance in the episode "Ep. #1207"
2004	JAG	General Matthew Smithfield U.S.M.C. Ret.	Guest appearance in the episode "Coming Home"
2004	Cold Case	Herb	Guest appearance in the episode "Mindhunters"
2005	Fat Cats	Judge Baddin	
2005	Charmed	Recruitment officer	Guest appearance in the episode "Malice in Wonderland"
2005	Fortunes	Mr. Croshere	
2007	Queens Supreme	Norman Plotkin	Guest appearance in the episode "Permanent Markers"
