= Jo Ann Havrilla =

American actress

- Born: May 30, 1950 (age 75)
- Other names: Joann Havrilla
- Occupation: Actress
- Years active: 1988–2004

Jo Ann Havrilla (born May 30, 1950) is an American actress. She played Penny Pingleton's racist mother Prudence Pingleton in the original film version of Hairspray in 1988. She is also known as Joann Havrilla.

== Filmography ==
Year	Title	Role	Notes
1988	Hairspray	Prudence Pingleton	
1989	Her Alibi	Woman at Lecture	
1989	Driving Miss Daisy	Miss McClatchey	
2004	Sara Goes to Lunch	Maxine	short
