= Celia Newman =

American actress (born 1968)

- Born: October 21, 1968 (age 56); San Miguel de Allende, Mexico
- Years active: 1974–present
- Spouse: Senator Jose Menéndez (m. 1995)
- Children: Dominic(b. 2000); Victoria(b. 2002); Austin(b. 2007)
- Parent: Buhl Thompson Newman (deceased) 11/20/1933 - 08/23/2013 & Winifred Lee Barnum-Newman (10/31/1940)
- Website: facebook/newmanartista.com facebook/Olivia-Adair.com

Celia Maria Newman (born October 21, 1968, in San Miguel de Allende, Mexico) is an actress, sometimes credited as Cehlia Barnum. She has been in numerous feature films and appeared in the TV series Dallas in the 1980s.

== Life and career ==
Newman is married to Texas State Senator Jose Menendez (District 26) and has been actively involved in her husband's political career. She gave birth to the couple's third child in 2007.

A relative on her father's side was actor and political satirist Will Rogers and on her mother's side showman P.T. Barnum.

== Early life ==
Newman attended University of The Incarnate Word and received a degree in child psychology. While there she participated in the theater program and was directed in several student productions. These productions included Golden Boy as Lorna, directed by actor Ricardo Chavira.

Newman is of Scotch-Irish, Spanish, Cherokee and Prussian Jewish descent.

As a child, Newman was a member, of the Texas Children's Bach Choir; she studied opera for several years and was listed as a coloratura soprano.

Newman now goes by the name Cehlia Nicole Newman-Menendez.

== Family ==
Spouse - Jose Menéndez (9 September 1995–present)
Children - Dominic, Victoria, Austin

== Filmography ==
- My Two Loves (1986) - Mean Cheerleader - VOC
- The Legend of Billie Jean (1985) - Interview Girl - VOC
- Lost Angels (1989) - Paco's Girl "Maria" - VOC

== Television ==
- Dallas (1985) - “Charlie's friend”/gang leader's girlfriend - VOC
