= Margaret Gwenver =

American stage and television actress

- Born: Margaret Guenveur; October 10, 1926; Wilmington, Delaware, U.S.
- Died: October 18, 2010 (aged 84); New York City, New York, U.S.
- Occupation: Actress

Margaret Gwenver (also known by her married name, Margaret G. Sedwick) was an American stage and television actress.

Born as Margaret Guenveur on October 10, 1926, in Wilmington, Delaware, she was best known for her role as Dr. Sedgwick on the long-running daytime soap opera, Guiding Light. Gwenver appeared in the supporting role, as a recurring character, on the long-running show from 1979 until 2009. In between appearances, she also played the role of Yancy Ralston's widow Blanche on One Life to Live on and off from 1981 to 1983.

She began her career at the Margaret Webster Shakespeare Company in New York City in the 1940s. She and her husband, John Sedwick, founded the Tanglewood Theater.

== Death ==
Margaret Gwenver died on October 18, 2010, in New York City, aged 84. She was survived by five children and eight grandchildren. She was predeceased by her husband. She is buried in St. Joseph on the Brandywine cemetery.

== Filmography ==
- One Life to Live (1982) (Blanche Ralston)
- Amen (TV series) (1987) (Judge)
- Hit List (1989 film) (Judge)
- Guiding Light (1979-2007) (Dr. Margaret Sedwick)
