= Jacknife =

1989 film directed by David Hugh Jones

- U.S. Theatrical Poster
- Directed by: David Jones
- Screenplay by: Stephen Metcalfe
- Based on: Strange Snow; 1982 play by Stephen Metcalfe
- Produced by: Carol Baum; Robert Schaffel
- Starring: Robert De Niro; Ed Harris; Kathy Baker
- Cinematography: Brian West
- Edited by: John Bloom
- Music by: Bruce Broughton
- Production company: Kings Road Entertainment
- Distributed by: Cineplex Odeon Films (North America); Vestron Pictures (International)
- Release date: March 10, 1989
- Running time: 102 minutes
- Country: United States
- Language: English
- Budget: $10 million
- Box office: $2,049,769

Jacknife is a 1989 American film directed by David Jones and starring Robert De Niro, Ed Harris and Kathy Baker. The film focuses on a complex tension between people in a close family relationship. Stephen Metcalfe, on whose play Strange Snow (1982) the film is based, wrote the screenplay. Harris was nominated for a Golden Globe Award for his performance.

== Plot ==
Joseph Megessey (known to most as "Megs") is a Vietnam War veteran who has post-traumatic stress syndrome, and who is having trouble integrating with society. He finds Dave, a fellow veteran who has become an alcoholic, and attempts to bring him out of his depression by encouraging him to enjoy life again, as well as urging him to face some of his darker memories.

Megs is attracted to Dave's sister Martha, who lives with Dave and looks after him. Megs and Martha fall in love, much to Dave's disapproval. Dave eventually vents his anger and frustration at a high-school prom at which Martha is a chaperone who is accompanied by Megs. This leads Dave to finally face his demons and acknowledge Megs and Martha for being there for him. Afterward, despite initially ending what was a promising romance, Megs returns to Martha.

== Cast ==
- Robert De Niro as Joseph "Megs" Megessey
- Ed Harris as Dave
- Kathy Baker as Martha
- Sloane Shelton as Shirley
- Ivar Brogger as Depot Mechanic
- Michael Arkin as Dispatcher
- Tom Isbell as Bobby Buckman
- Kirk Taylor as Helicopter Gunner
- Jordan Lund as Tiny
- Tom Rack as William Green
- Charles S. Dutton as Jake, Veteran Encounter Group Leader (as Charles Dutton)
- Bruce Ramsay as Corridor Student
- Jessalyn Gilsig as His Girlfriend
- George Gerdes as Tony
- Josh Pais as Rick
- Loudon Wainwright III as Ferretti
- Walter Massey as Ed Buckman
- Elizabeth Franz as Pru Buckman

== Production ==
The movie was filmed in Montreal, Quebec, Canada, as well as several Connecticut locations, including Meriden, Wallingford, Newington, New Britain and Newtown.

== Reception ==
On the review aggregator website Rotten Tomatoes, 64% of 14 critics' reviews are positive.
