= Norman D. Wilson (actor) =

American actor

- Born: October 4, 1938; Catahoula, Louisiana, United States
- Died: December 9, 2004 (aged 66); Los Angeles, California, United States
- Occupation: Actor
- Years active: 1973-2000

Norman D. Wilson (4 October 1938 – 9 December 2004) was an American actor. He appeared in Lethal Weapon 3 (1992), Always Outnumbered (1998) and The Stone Killer (1973). He died on December 9, 2004, in Los Angeles.

== Filmography ==
Year	Title	Role	Notes
1973	The Stone Killer	Bartender	
1983	The Jeffersons TV series, episode 9x21	Tony	
1987	Lethal Weapon	Bartender	Uncredited
1988	Action Jackson	Man in Bar	Uncredited
1988	They Live	Newspaper Vendor	Uncredited
1988	Scrooged	TV Crew	Uncredited
1989	Lethal Weapon 2	Cop	Uncredited
1989	Born on the Fourth of July	Veteran	Uncredited
1992	Radio Flyer	Extra	Uncredited
1992	Lethal Weapon 3	George	
1998	Always Outnumbered	Domino Player #2	
1998	Rush Hour	Card Player	Uncredited
