= Hit List (1989 film) =

American action film by William Lustig

- United States video release poster.
- Directed by: William Lustig
- Written by: Peter Brosnan; John F. Goff
- Produced by: Lisa M. Hansen; Paul Hertzberg; Jefferson Richard
- Starring: Jan-Michael Vincent; Leo Rossi; Lance Henriksen; Charles Napier; Rip Torn
- Cinematography: James Lemmo; Vincent J. Rabe
- Music by: Garry Schyman
- Production company: CineTel Films
- Distributed by: New Line Cinema
- Release date: March 3, 1989
- Running time: 87 minutes
- Country: United States
- Language: English

Hit List is a 1989 action-thriller film directed by William Lustig. The tagline for the movie was: "They attacked the wrong woman... They kidnapped the wrong child... And they made the wrong man their target." The film was produced by Cinetel Films and was distributed in US theaters by New Line Cinema and in Canadian theaters by Cineplex Odeon Films and on VHS format by RCA/Columbia Pictures Home Video, but has been out of print for some time. As of December 26, 2009, Sony has not announced any plans to release a DVD of the movie.

== Plot ==
Gangster boss Vic Luca (Rip Torn) is scheduled to appear in court and so hires a hit man/shoe salesman Chris Caleek (Lance Henriksen) to kill the witnesses. He has a mole in the police force who tells him names and locations of the witnesses. Unfortunately, during the last hit, the professional killer enters the wrong house. When owner Jack Collins comes home, he finds his pregnant wife unconscious in the kitchen, his friend dead in the living room and his son kidnapped. Wanting Luca to believe he has the real witness' son, the authorities take Collins into custody. But Collins manages to escape and takes things into his own hands.

== Cast ==
- Jan-Michael Vincent as Jack Collins
- Leo Rossi as Frank DeSalvo
- Lance Henriksen as Chris Caleek
- Charles Napier as Tom Mitchum
- Rip Torn as Vic Luca
- Harold Sylvester as Brian Armstrong
- Jere Burns as Jared Riley
- Junior Richard as Kenny Collins
- Harreit Hall as Sandy Collins
- Ken Lerner as Gravenstein
- Jack Andreozzi as Abe Fasio
- Nick Barbaro as Mario
- Lou Bonacki as Johnson
- Barry Brener as the doctor
- Geoff Brewer as Brock
- Richard E. Butler as Wink
- Christopher Carroll as the priest
- Robert A. Ferretti as Vincent Carelli
- John F. Goff as the prosecutor
- John Greene as Burke
- Margaret Gwenver as the judge
- Lisa M. Hansen as the shoe store clerk
- Dennis Junt as the reporter
- Lauri Landry as Connie Wayne
- Scott Lincoln as Paulie
- Jason Lustig as Gravenstein’s Assistant
- Vic Manni as George
- Felice Orlandi as Joey DeSalvo
- Frank Pesce as Quigley
- Pearl Shear as Mrs. Gulliver
- John Paul Vetturini as Frank Jr.

== Production ==
In a 2019 interview, director William Lustig said Jan-Michael Vincent was drinking during the shoot, even though the actor was hired because he told them he had just finished rehab:

"When we met him to do Hit List he had been in a recovery program and he was telling us that his drinking days were finished. And he looked great. At the time he was young enough that when he stopped drinking he immediately looked good again. He came in, he looked good, he assured us he wasn’t drinking, so we hired him. Literally the very first day of shooting I smelled alcohol on his breath.But I have to say, for the most part he was a functioning alcoholic."
