= Helen Shaw (actress) =

American actress

- Born: July 25, 1897; Birmingham, Michigan, U.S.
- Died: September 8, 1997 (aged 100); Los Angeles, California, U.S.
- Resting place: Forest Lawn Memorial Park
- Occupations: Actress, writing coach
- Years active: 1904–1989
- Spouse: Loren Stauch (m. 1918; div. 1934)
- Children: 1

Helen Alliene Shaw (July 25, 1897 – September 8, 1997) was an American actress. She is best known for her roles as Mrs. Dempsey in the 1983 film Twilight Zone: The Movie and Steve Martin's grandmother in the 1989 comedy Parenthood. She was a humorous guest during her first and only appearance on The Tonight Show Starring Johnny Carson.

== Early life ==
Shaw was born on July 25, 1897, in Birmingham, Michigan, the daughter of Bertha Maud (née Crafts; 1873-1964) and Dr. Nenian Thomas Shaw (1867-1952), a Canadian-born physician. Shaw studied medicine at one time and on February 17, 1923, was present in Egypt when Howard Carter unsealed the tomb of the Pharaoh Tutankhamun. She married Loren George Stauch (1892-1957) on April 22, 1918, in Birmingham and they had one daughter, Patricia Alliene Stauch (1924-2018), before divorcing in August 1935, with extreme cruelty being cited as Shaw's reason for seeking the divorce. In her 1989 appearance on The Tonight Show with Johnny Carson she mentioned the marriage as being brief and commented on how couples need to be well paired for one to work.

== Career ==
In 1938, Shaw, along with her parents and daughter, moved to southern California. Shaw became active as a writer and director with the Theatre Americana of Altadena, and served as a writing coach for 30 years. She later took stage acting roles at the Theatre Americana and the Glendale Centre Theatre. Then, at the age of 82, she became a professional actress. Her first notable role was in the television movie Rape and Marriage: The Rideout Case in 1980, which was followed by several additional appearances in film and television.

== Death ==
Shaw died on September 8, 1997, a month and a half after her 100th birthday, in Los Angeles and was interred in Forest Lawn Memorial Park in Glendale, California, under the name Helen Shaw Stauch.

== Filmography ==
=== Television ===
Year	Title	Role	Notes
1980	Rape and Marriage: The Rideout Case	Uncredited	Television film
1984	Diff'rent Strokes	Elderly lady	Episode: "Arnold the Entrepreneur"
1985	Highway to Heaven	Ethel	Episode: “The Right Thing”
1985	Hell Town	Ruthie	Episode: "Hell Town Goes Bananas”
1989	The Tonight Show with Johnny Carson	Herself	October 5, 1989

=== Film ===
Year	Title	Role	Notes
1983	Twilight Zone: The Movie	Mrs. Dempsy	Segment: “Kick the Can”
1989	Wicked Stepmother	Sadie	
1989	Parenthood	Grandma	
