= Stephen Metcalfe (screenwriter) =

American film director and screenwriter

Stephen Metcalfe is an American film director and screenwriter. Metcalfe's career has touched on all forms of dramatic writing; screen, television and stage.

Metcalfe's first produced screenplay was Jacknife. Based on his Off-Broadway play, Strange Snow, it starred Robert De Niro, Ed Harris and Kathy Baker and was directed by David Jones. The adaptation of French director Jean-Charles Tacchella's Cousin, cousine soon followed. Produced by Paramount Pictures, Cousins was directed by Joel Schumacher. He also wrote the production drafts for Pretty Woman, Arachnophobia and Mr. Holland's Opus.

Metcalfe has adapted both stage plays and novels to film. His play Emily was done for Scott Rudin and Paramount Pictures; Time Flies, by Paul Linke, was adapted for producer Laura Ziskin; A.R. Gurney's The Old Boy was written for Touchstone Pictures; and Peter Mayle's comic novel Anything Considered was done for producer Stanley R. Jaffe and Sony Pictures.

In 2002 Metcalfe wrote and directed the independent film Beautiful Joe.

Metcalfe's stage plays include Loves & Hours, Vikings, Strange Snow, Sorrows and Sons, Pilgrims, Half a Lifetime, Emily, White Linen, Divirtimenti, The Incredibly Famous Willy Rivers, and White man Dancing. His play The Tragedy of the Commons premiered in January 2011 at Cygnet Theatre Company in San Diego. His young adult novel The Tragic Age was published in 2016. His plays have been produced Off-Broadway, in regional theatres and internationally.

== Personal ==
Metcalfe grew up in Cheshire, Connecticut.
