= Leonard Parker (actor) =

American actor (1932–2007)

Leonard Rudy Parker Jr. (July 22, 1932 – December 7, 2007) was an American actor in theater, film and television. He is known for his performance in the film Nothing But a Man.

== Early life and education ==
Parker was born and raised in Cleveland, Ohio, the second of three children, to Leonard and Emily Francis Gibson Parker. He graduated from Thomas Edison High School. He studied music and voice at the Cleveland Music Settlement House.

Parker joined the United States Army where he served in the Special Services unit and performed vocally with the Stuttgart military orchestra. After receiving an honorable discharge in 1954, he received a Bachelor of Arts degree and a master's degree. He graduated from the Cleveland Institute of Music where he received a music scholarship, and he is also a graduate of Case Western Reserve University School of Drama. He then went on to study and perform with Karamu Theatre.

== Career ==
Parker performed in a number of theater productions, including Lost in the Stars by Kurt Weill and Maxwell Anderson, in which he played and sang the role of “Stephen Kumalo” Parker also performed in Night Visitors and afterwards performed in Ernest Block's Macbeth in New York. While there, he studied voice with Laura Miller at Juilliard and vocal coaching under Sam Morganstein with the Metropolitan Opera House.

In 1958, in New York City, Parker performed the role of Crown in a traveling tour of Porgy & Bess. Returning to the Living Theatre, he played in Broadway's One Flew Over the Cuckoo’s Nest which featured Kirk Douglas. His Broadway theater work continued with The Physicists and Fly Blackbird. His Off-Broadway work included The Connection, Dark of the Moon, The Apple, Capitol Cakewalk, The Boys In the Basement and Jen Genet's The Blacks.

Parker appeared in a number of films, including: Malcolm X, Nothing But a Man, Sweet Love Bitter, Stiletto, Last of the Red Hot Lovers, Inside Harlem, Clockers, Ghost Busters II, Proudly We Served, and The Devil and Daniel Webster. His television credits include: Naked City, The Defenders, Armstrong Circle, Theater, The Doctors and The Nurses, As The World Turns, N.Y.P.D. Body in the Trunk and Now and Again.

Parker worked extensively with The Yale Repertory Theater and was featured in a number of regional theater productions including: Joe Turner's Come and Gone, Two Trains Running, A Child's Tale, Planet Fire, Cry The Beloved Country, Promises, Promises, Carmen Jones, Tale of The Soldiers, The Emperor, Jones, Gabriel, and Free and Easy.

Parker was appointed Executive Director of Arts & Culture Foundation in Central Harlem, a role that encompassed the You-Act anti-poverty arts program. Employed by the City of New York, Parker oversaw operations across several departments within the foundation.

== Personal life and death ==
Parker married his second wife Elaine in 1964 and they had one son, Leonard.

Leonard Parker died on December 7, 2007, at the age of 75.
