= Mark Stolzenberg =

American actor

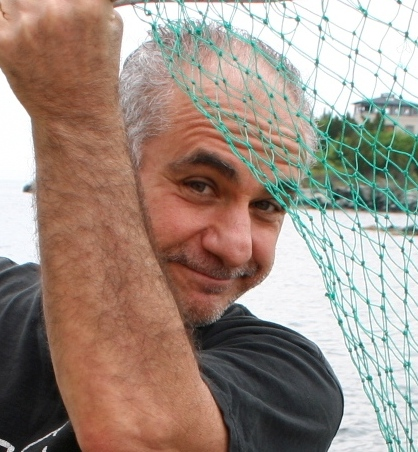
- Stolzenberg in 2007
- Occupations: Film, stage actor, clown

Mark Stolzenberg is an American film and stage actor, screenwriter, producer, physical comedian and circus artist.

== Career ==
Stolzenberg is considered by Oscar Talent Search as among the top ten acting teachers on the East Coast. He has appeared on the Late Show with David Letterman and All My Children, and acted in several films. He has also published several books - including Be a Clown, and Be a Mime, which give advice on performing as a clown and mime respectively.

Stolzenberg is called upon by major commercial houses to help actors in closeups for product sales, and he teaches "Acting For Film and Television" at The New School in Manhattan and at his private studio.

Stolzenberg is the director of Assemblies In Schools, a national organization providing in-school programs. Programs fulfill principals' and educators' needs for content that addresses self-esteem and good habits, as well as having anti-drug and anti-alcohol messages. He also is the founder and director of The NY Acting School for Film and TV, a school which offers classes in acting for film, movies and television.

He is currently producing a feature film called "Maximum Fun". He has played principal roles in a dozen films and over 30 television commercials.
