= Lost Angels =

1989 film by Hugh Hudson

- Theatrical release poster
- Directed by: Hugh Hudson
- Written by: Michael Weller
- Produced by: Thomas Baer; Howard Rosenman
- Starring: Donald Sutherland; Adam Horovitz
- Cinematography: Juan Ruiz Anchía
- Edited by: David Gladwell
- Music by: Philippe Sarde
- Distributed by: Orion Pictures
- Release date: May 5, 1989
- Running time: 116 minutes
- Country: United States
- Language: English
- Box office: $1.2 million (US)

Lost Angels (also known as The Road Home) is a 1989 American independent drama film directed by Hugh Hudson and written by Michael Weller, known for his work on Ragtime and Hair. The film stars Donald Sutherland and Adam Horovitz, best known as a member of the Beastie Boys, in his first major acting role.

The story follows a troubled teenage boy, Tim Doolan (Horovitz), who is sent to a juvenile psychiatric hospital after a violent altercation. Under the guidance of a compassionate psychiatrist, Dr. Charles Loftis (Sutherland), he struggles to navigate the challenges of youth, rebellion and alienation in a society that seems eager to label and control him.

Despite being set in Los Angeles, Lost Angels was primarily filmed in and around San Antonio, Texas. The film explores themes of teenage disillusionment, institutionalization, and the struggle for personal identity in an unforgiving system.

The film was entered into the 1989 Cannes Film Festival, where it competed for the Palme d’Or, signifying its recognition within the international film industry. While Lost Angels received mixed critical reviews upon release, it has since gained a cult following for its raw portrayal of teenage alienation and its period-specific representation of youth culture in late-1980s America.

== Plot ==
In southern California, Tim Doolan is released from juvenile detention, and departs with his mother, Felicia, and her new husband, Barton Marks, arriving at a psychiatric facility for troubled youth called Valley Acres. Tim refuses to acclimate to the establishment and when he becomes belligerent, the hospital's orderlies are forced to restrain him. He remembers a night from the prior month when he, his half-brother Andy, and their gang, the D.A.B.’s, entered into an altercation with rivals from the 10th St. Gang. Afterwards, Tim spent the night with Cheryl Anderson, the girlfriend of his friend, Link; Cheryl proceeded to drive her mother’s convertible into their swimming pool out of frustration with her chronic alcoholism. The following morning, Tim's abusive estranged father Richard arrived at the police station with a gun and narcotics he located in Tim’s bedroom. With Felicia away for several weeks on her honeymoon with Barton, and Richard unwilling to watch him, Tim was left unsupervised, and a judge ordered him to a juvenile detention center until she returned.

Later, at Valley Acres, psychiatrist Dr. Charles Loftis meets with Tim, recognizing that the adolescent does not deserve to be there. However, Tim is barred from leaving the premises, and begins attending group sessions with others, including Cheryl, who apologizes to Tim for getting him into trouble, as her mother had her committed to the facility. Seeing an opportunity, Tim climbs over the wall and unsuccessfully attempts escape. Loftis promises to assist Tim if the boy remains in the compound. Sometime later, Tim has sex with Cheryl in a shower stall. During family counseling with Loftis, Richard verbally abuses Felicia, and insults Barton; Loftis scolds the adults, reminding them to focus on Tim. Cheryl is soon released, despite Loftis’s belief that she needs to remain. Hoping to reunite with Cheryl, Tim decides to be on his best behavior so that he can earn his release. After receiving off-ground privileges, Tim’s half-brother, Andy, arrives to take him out for the day. Arriving at Felicia’s house, Tim learns that Barton sent him to Valley Acres and has turned his bedroom into an office. He storms out and visit Cheryl, who is now living alone in her mother's empty house, as her mother has sold it following her committal to Valley Acres. He becomes worried when he discovers that Cheryl has turned to drugs, and after obtaining Loftis’s address, takes Cheryl to get help. However, Loftis, unhappy about the house call, accuses Tim of going AWOL and reports him to Valley Acres, but Tim returns to the facility independently. Feeling betrayed, Tim vandalizes the facility, spray-painting graffiti on the walls. Loftis arrives and encourages Tim to fight him, allowing the youth to release his pent-up energy before calming down and then painting over the graffiti.

Andy telephones Tim, furious about his absence from a gang fight, and pressures him into partaking in a rematch fight the following weekend. Learning en route to the destination of Andy’s plot to engage in a drive-by shooting on the 10th St. Gang, he initially refuses to participate, but Andy coerces him into pointing the gun at the rival gang leader. However, as Andy drives by the rival gang, Tim fires at the ground instead. While fleeing, Andy crashes into another vehicle, and Tim escapes from both the scene of the collision and the rival gang as Andy frantically drives away. He searches for Andy at Richard’s house but encounters Richard, demanding to converse with him, and father and son finally embrace each other. Andy arrives outside with Cheryl in tow, and Tim holds him at gunpoint and fires shots near his head, frightening him. Ignoring Cheryl's attempts at reasoning with him, Tim escapes to Loftis’s house. However, Loftis, drunk and unsympathetic after having recently separated from his wife Judith, demands that Tim depart the premises, but the youth falls asleep in a spare bedroom and the following morning, asks Loftis to take him in, admitting that he has been deprived of a stable home environment throughout his entire youth. Loftis informs Tim that Felicia has inquired about him, and drops him off at her house, promising to ensure he will ultimately never return to Valley Acres.

== Cast ==
- Donald Sutherland as Dr. Charles Loftis
- Adam Horovitz as Tim "Chino" Doolan
- Amy Locane as Cheryl Anderson
- Don Bloomfield as Andy "Natas" Doolan
- Celia Weston as Felicia Doolan Marks
- Graham Beckel as Richard Doolan
- Patricia Richardson as Mrs. Anderson
- Ron Frazier as Barton Marks
- Joe D'Angerio as Sweeney
- William O'Leary as Link
- Kevin Corrigan as Gata
- Gary Riley as Spooky
- Michael Cunningham as D.A.B. Kid
- Leonard Porter Salazar as Paco
- Jonathan Del Arco as Angel
- Celia Newman as Maria
- David Herman as Carlo
- Max Perlich as Frankie
- Nina Siemaszko as Merilee
- Kevin Tighe as Dr. Gaeyl
- John C. McGinley as Dr. Farmer
- Frances Fisher as Judith Loftis
- Lee Wilkof as Ted Bingham
- James N. Harrell as Shelby
- Jack Gold as Judge
- Keone Young as Atty. Victor Eng
- Park Overall as Richard Doolan's Girlfriend
- Pauly Shore as Kid #3

== Reception ==
On Rotten Tomatoes, the film has a score of 40% based on reviews from 5 critics.

The film, directed by Hugh Hudson and released in 1989, received a mixed critical reception upon its release. The film was nominated for the Palme d'Or at the 1989 Cannes Film Festival, indicating some recognition within the industry.

Roger Ebert of the Chicago Sun-Times awarded the film two and a half stars out of four, acknowledging its intelligent and well-crafted nature but expressing a sense of detachment, stating he remained "strangely unmoved" while watching it.

In retrospect, some critics have praised the film’s portrayal of youth culture. A 2019 article from MovieWeb described Lost Angels as "one of the top 5 best youth culture films of the 1980s," highlighting Adam Horovitz’s performance as exceptional.

Overall, Lost Angels elicited a range of reactions, with initial reviews noting its craftsmanship but lacking emotional impact, while later assessments have recognized its cultural significance and performances.
