= List of Orion Pictures films =

This is a list of films released by the American film production and distribution company Orion Pictures.

Films that won the Oscar for Best Picture are noted with one asterisk (*). Films that were nominated for Best Picture but did not win are noted with two asterisks (**).

== 1970s ==
Release date	Title	Notes	Budget	Gross
April 27, 1979	A Little Romance (Note: Released through Warner Bros. Unless otherwise noted, Warner retains complete ownership)		$3 million	
May 18, 1979	Over the Edge	North American distribution only	$3 million	
July 4, 1979	The Wanderers (Note: Owned by the film's producers, although Orion's successor MGM holds the copyright)	North American distribution only; produced by Film Finance Group	$4 million	$23,000,000
August 17, 1979	Life of Brian (Note: Owned by Python (Monty) Pictures, with distribution rights licensed to Mercury Studios, which has further sub-licensed North American rights including AVOD, SVOD, broadcast, theatrical and non-theatrical distribution to Shout! Studios)	North American distribution only; produced by Handmade Films	$4 million	$20,045,115
August 31, 1979	Time After Time		$3.5 million	$13,000,000
October 5, 1979	10		$7 million	$74,865,517
October 26, 1979	The Great Santini	co-production with Bing Crosby Productions	$4 million	$4,702,575
November 2, 1979	Promises in the Dark		$5 million	

== 1980s ==
Release date	Title	Notes	Budget	Gross
February 1, 1980	Simon		$3.5 million	$6,000,000
April 19, 1980	Die Laughing		$4 million	$4,000,000
April 25, 1980	Heart Beat		$3.5 million	$954,046
July 25, 1980	Caddyshack		$6 million	$39,846,344
August 8, 1980	The Fiendish Plot of Dr. Fu Manchu		$10 million	$10,697,276
September 8, 1980	Battle Beyond the Stars	international distribution only; produced by New World Pictures	$2,000,000	$7.5 million
October 31, 1980	The Awakening	North American distribution only		$8,415,112
February 11, 1981	Sphinx		$14 million	$2,022,771
April 10, 1981	Excalibur		$11 million	$34,967,437
April 24, 1981	The Hand		$6.5 million	$2,447,576
July 17, 1981	Arthur		$7 million	$95,461,682
July 24, 1981	Wolfen		$17 million	$10,626,725
July 31, 1981	Under the Rainbow		$20 million	$18,826,490
August 21, 1981	Prince of the City		$8.6 million	$8,124,257
December 11, 1981	Rollover		$16 million	$10,851,261
December 18, 1981	Sharky's Machine		$17.5 million	$35,856,053
May 28, 1982	The Escape Artist (Note: Owned by American Zoetrope, with U.S. distribution handled by Lionsgate)	North American theatrical distribution only; produced by Zoetrope Studios		$143,369
July 16, 1982	A Midsummer Night's Sex Comedy (Note: Director Woody Allen would retain rights to this film after its release, later selling it to Orion parent MGM in 2000)			$9,077,269
September 17, 1982	Hammett	North American distribution only; produced by Zoetrope Studios	$7 million	$42,914
September 24, 1982	Amityville II: The Possession	North American distribution only; produced by Dino De Laurentiis Company; first film released after the purchase and acquisition of Filmways, Inc.		$11,328,000
October 3, 1982	Split Image (Note: Owned by Universal Pictures, with certain distribution rights licensed to Lionsgate)	North American theatrical distribution only; produced by PolyGram Pictures	$8 million	$263,635
October 22, 1982	First Blood (Note: Owned by StudioCanal)	U.S. theatrical distribution only; produced by Anabasis Investments	$14 million	$125,212,904
April 15, 1983	Lone Wolf McQuade		$5 million	$12,232,628
May 13, 1983	Breathless		$7 million	$19,910,002
June 24, 1983	Yellowbeard (Note: Hemdale retained the rights to this film after its release, whose library would continuously change hands over the next decade before resting with PolyGram Filmed Entertainment in 1997. By virtue of acquiring PolyGram's pre-1996 library, rights to this film returned full circles back to Orion)	distribution only; produced by Hemdale Film Corporation	$10 million	$4,300,000
July 6, 1983	Class		$7 million	$21,667,789
July 15, 1983	Zelig	Final Orion Pictures feature released through Warner Bros.		$11,798,616
August 19, 1983	Easy Money			$29,309,766
September 16, 1983	Strange Invaders	North American distribution only	$5.5 million	$1,362,303
October 21, 1983	Under Fire		$9.5 million	$5,696,391
November 18, 1983	Amityville 3-D	North American distribution only; produced by Dino De Laurentiis Corporation		$6,333,135
December 15, 1983	Gorky Park	co-production with Eagle Associates	$15 million	$15,856,028
January 20, 1984	Scandalous		$5 million	$526,805
January 27, 1984	Broadway Danny Rose		$8 million	$10,600,497
March 2, 1984	Harry & Son		$9.5 million	$4,864,980
March 9, 1984	The Hotel New Hampshire	North American distribution only; produced by Woodfall Film Productions	$7.5 million	$5,142,858
April 6, 1984	Up the Creek		$7 million	$11,708,269
May 4, 1984	The Bounty (Note: Orion now owns worldwide rights to this film, having acquired PolyGram Filmed Entertainment's pre-1996 library that included the catalog of Dino de Laurentiis Corporation, the international rights holder of the film)	North American distribution only; produced by Dino De Laurentiis Corporation	$20–25 million	$8,613,462
June 8, 1984	Beat Street		$9.5 million	$16,595,791
July 27, 1984	Cheech and Chong's The Corsican Brothers			$3,772,785
August 15, 1984	The Woman in Red		$9 million	$25,308,147
September 19, 1984	Amadeus* (Note: Owned by Teatro della Pace Films, with distribution rights handled by Warner Bros.)	North American theatrical distribution only Inducted into the National Film Registry in 2019	$18 million	$51,973,029
September 28, 1984	Heartbreakers			$148,750
October 26, 1984	The Terminator	distribution only; produced by Hemdale Film Corporation; Inducted into the National Film Registry in 2008	$6.5 million	$78,371,200
December 14, 1984	The Cotton Club	North American distribution only; produced by Zoetrope Studios	$58 million	$25,928,721
January 25, 1985	The Falcon and the Snowman (Note: Initially shared by Orion and Hemdale, Orion would gain full control of the rights to this film through its acquisition of PolyGram Filmed Entertainment's pre-1996 library that also included Hemdale's catalog)	distribution only; produced by Hemdale Film Corporation	$12 million	$17,130,087
February 15, 1985	The Mean Season		$10 million	$4,300,000
February 15, 1985	The Bay Boy			$162,364
March 1, 1985	The Purple Rose of Cairo		$15 million	$10,631,333
March 29, 1985	Desperately Seeking Susan	Inducted into the National Film Registry in 2023	$4.5 million	$27,398,584
May 3, 1985	Code of Silence		$7 million	$20,345,561
June 14, 1985	Secret Admirer		$7 million	$8,622,757
July 26, 1985	The Heavenly Kid			$3,852,271
August 16, 1985	The Return of the Living Dead	distribution only; produced by Hemdale Film Corporation	$4 million	$14,237,880
August 30, 1985	Flesh & Blood		$6.5 million	$100,000
August 30, 1985	Beer			
September 6, 1985	Crimes of Passion (Note: Owned by Shamrock Holdings (via Lakeshore Entertainment)	international distribution only; produced by New World Pictures	$3 million	$2.9 million
September 27, 1985	Maxie		$7 million	$2,564,278
October 11, 1985	Remo Williams: The Adventure Begins		$40 million	$12,421,181
	The Piece Maker	The film was abandoned after 1985 proved to be a disappointing box office year for Orion.		
January 17, 1986	The Longshot			$256,301
February 7, 1986	F/X		$10 million	$20,603,715
March 14, 1986	Hannah and Her Sisters**		$6.4 million	$59,000,000
March 21, 1986	Just Between Friends	co-production with MTM Enterprises		$6,408,791
April 18, 1986	At Close Range	distribution only; produced by Hemdale Film Corporation	$6.5 million	$2,347,000
April 18, 1986	Absolute Beginners	U.S. distribution only; co-production of Goldcrest Films and Virgin Films	£8.4 million	$930,211
June 13, 1986	Back to School		$11 million	$91,258,000
July 11, 1986	Miracles			
July 25, 1986	Haunted Honeymoon		$13 million	$8,033,397
August 1986	Opposing Force			
September 26, 1986	Foreign Body			
November 7, 1986	Something Wild		$7 million	$8,362,969
November 14, 1986	Hoosiers	distribution only; produced by Hemdale Film Corporation; Inducted into the National Film Registry in 2001	$9 million	$28,607,524
December 12, 1986	Three Amigos (Note: U.S. home media and pay-TV distribution rights currently owned by Warner Bros. (via HBO Films))	co-production with HBO Films	$25 million	$39,246,734
December 19, 1986	Platoon*	distribution only; produced by Hemdale Film Corporation; Inducted into the National Film Registry in 2019	$6.5 million	$138,530,565
January 30, 1987	Radio Days		$16 million	$14,792,779
April 3, 1987	Making Mr. Right		$9 million	$1,584,970
May 1, 1987	Malone		$10 million	$3,060,858
June 10, 1987	The Believers		$13 million	$18,753,438
July 17, 1987	RoboCop		$13 million	$53,424,681
August 14, 1987	No Way Out		$15 million	$35,509,515
August 14, 1987	Lionheart (Note: Owned by Warner Bros. (via Taliafilm II Productions))	U.S. distribution		
September 18, 1987	Hotel Colonial	distribution only; produced by Hemdale Film Corporation		$9,526
September 25, 1987	Best Seller	distribution only; produced by Hemdale Film Corporation		$4,278,150
October 11, 1987	House of Games			$2,585,639
October 23, 1987	No Man's Land		$8 million	$2,877,571
December 4, 1987	Manon of the Spring (Note: Owned by Pathé)	U.S. distribution		
December 11, 1987	Throw Momma from the Train		$14 million	$57,915,972
December 18, 1987	September		$10 million	$486,434
December 19, 1987	Terror at the Opera (Note: U.S. home video distribution rights currently owned by Severin Films)	co-production of ADC Films, Cecchi Gori Group, and Tiger Cinematografica	$8 million	
January 15, 1988	The Couch Trip		$17 million	$11,005,304
February 5, 1988	Cherry 2000		$10 million	$14,000
February 5, 1988	The Unbearable Lightness of Being		$17 million	$10,006,806
February 12, 1988	The In Crowd			$124,880
March 4, 1988	The House on Carroll Street		$14 million	$459,824
March 18, 1988	Dominick and Eugene		$5 million	$3,076,031
March 25, 1988	Johnny Be Good			$17,550,399
April 15, 1988	Colors		$10 million	$46,616,067
June 15, 1988	Bull Durham		$7 million	$50,888,729
July 29, 1988	Monkey Shines		$7 million	$5,344,577
August 12, 1988	Mac and Me (Note: Orion now owns worldwide rights to Mac and Me as a result of the acquisition of the pre-1996 PolyGram Filmed Entertainment library, which included the Vision International catalog)	North American distribution only; produced by Vision International	$13 million	$6,424,112
August 19, 1988	Married to the Mob		$10 million	$21,486,757
September 2, 1988	Eight Men Out		$6 million	$5,680,515
October 21, 1988	Without a Clue (Note: Co-owned by ITV Studios)	North American distribution only; produced by ITC Entertainment		$8,539,181
November 18, 1988	Another Woman			$1,562,749
December 9, 1988	Mississippi Burning**		$15 million	$34,603,943
December 14, 1988	Dirty Rotten Scoundrels			$42,039,085
February 17, 1989	Bill & Ted's Excellent Adventure (Note: Orion now owns worldwide rights to this film as a result of the acquisition of the pre-1996 PolyGram Filmed Entertainment library, which included the Nelson Entertainment catalog)	North American theatrical distribution only; produced by Nelson Entertainment and Interscope Communications	$10 million	$40,485,039
March 3, 1989	Farewell to the King		$16 million	$2,420,917
April 21, 1989	Speed Zone		$18 million	$3.007 million
May 5, 1989	Lost Angels			$1,247,946
June 30, 1989	Great Balls of Fire!		$16 million	$13,741,060
July 21, 1989	UHF		$5 million	$6,157,157
August 16, 1989	Rude Awakening	distribution only; produced by Aaron Russo Entertainment and HBO	$10 million	$3,169,719
August 25, 1989	The Package		$16 million	$10,647,219
August 25, 1989	Heart of Dixie		$8 million	$1,097,333
September 22, 1989	Erik the Viking	US distribution only		$1,932,642
October 13, 1989	Crimes and Misdemeanors		$13 million	$18,254,702
November 17, 1989	Valmont	North American distribution only	$33 million	$1,132,112
November 17, 1989	Prancer	U.S. theatrical distribution only; produced by Nelson Entertainment and Cineplex Odeon Films	$7 million	$18,587,135
December 8, 1989	She-Devil		$16 million	$15,351,421

== 1990s ==
Release date	Title	Notes	Budget	Gross
January 19, 1990	Everybody Wins		$19 million	$1,372,350
February 16, 1990	Madhouse		$8 million	$21,036,771
March 9, 1990	The Last of the Finest	co-production with Davis Entertainment	$12 million	$1,531,489
March 9, 1990	Love at Large			$1,436,308
April 6, 1990	The First Power	North American theatrical distribution only; produced by Nelson Entertainment and Interscope Communications	$10 million	$22,424,195
April 20, 1990	Miami Blues		$11 million	$9,888,167
May 18, 1990	Cadillac Man		$15 million	$27,627,310
June 22, 1990	RoboCop 2		$35 million	$45,681,173
July 20, 1990	Navy SEALs		$21 million	$25,069,101
September 14, 1990	State of Grace			$1,911,542
October 26, 1990	The Hot Spot		$13 million	$1,293,976
November 21, 1990	Dances with Wolves* (Note: Distribution rights co-owned by Resurgence Media Group)	North American distribution only; produced by Tig Productions	$22 million	$424,208,848
December 14, 1990	Mermaids		$20 million	$35,419,397
December 25, 1990	Alice		$12 million	$7,331,647
January 18, 1991	Eve of Destruction	North American theatrical distribution only; produced by Nelson Entertainment and Interscope Communications	$13 million	$5,451,119
February 1, 1991	Off and Running	The film was not widely distributed		
February 14, 1991	The Silence of the Lambs*	Inducted into the National Film Registry in 2011	$19 million	$272,742,922
May 10, 1991	F/X2		$16.4 million	$21,082,165
June 1, 1991	Missing Pieces	This film was not widely distributed		
July 19, 1991	Bill & Ted's Bogus Journey (Note: Initially shared by Orion and Nelson, Orion would gain full control of the rights to this film through its acquisition of PolyGram Filmed Entertainment's pre-1996 library that also included Nelson's catalog)	distribution only; produced by Nelson Entertainment and Interscope Communications	$20 million	$38,037,513
August 16, 1991	Mystery Date		$10 million	$6,166,819
October 11, 1991	Little Man Tate		$10 million	$25,010,896
November 16, 1991	The Addams Family	International distribution only; co-production with Paramount Pictures	$30 million	$191,502,246
March 13, 1992	Article 99		$18 million	$6,375,979
March 20, 1992	Shadows and Fog		$14 million	$2,735,731
December 11, 1992	Love Field		$18 million	$1,014,726
March 26, 1993	Married to It		$14 million	$2,059,832
April 23, 1993	The Dark Half		$15 million	$10,611,160
October 22, 1993	Me and the Kid		$4 million	$60,473
November 5, 1993	RoboCop 3		$22 million	$10,600,000
January 1, 1994	Playmaker			
January 28, 1994	Car 54, Where Are You?		$10.7 million	$1,238,080
March 4, 1994	China Moon		$15 million	$3,038,499
April 1, 1994	Clifford	co-production with Morra, Brezner, Steinberg and Tenenbaum Entertainment (MBST)	$19 million	$7,411,659
April 29, 1994	The Favor	distribution only; produced by Nelson Entertainment	$12 million	$3,134,381
September 2, 1994	There Goes My Baby	distribution only; produced by Nelson Entertainment	$10.5 million	$123,509
September 16, 1994	Blue Sky		$16 million	$3,359,465
April 19, 1996	The Substitute (Note: Owned by Lionsgate)	North American theatrical distribution only; produced by LIVE Entertainment		$14,818,176
May 10, 1996	Original Gangstas		$3.6 million	$3,000,000
May 31, 1996	The Arrival	North American theatrical distribution only; produced by LIVE Entertainment	$25 million	$14,031,906
August 2, 1996	Phat Beach	North American theatrical distribution only; produced by LIVE Entertainment	$100,000	$1,383,553
January 1, 1997	Retroactive			
April 18, 1997	8 Heads in a Duffel Bag	North American distribution only; co-production with the Rank Organisation	$3 million	$3,602,884
May 14, 1997	City of Industry (Note: Owned by Library Rights Company (UK), Ltd. and Zelus Film Holding Company, LLC, with distribution rights currently licensed to Resurgence Media Group, which has sub-licensed U.S. rights to Shout! Studios)	North American distribution only; produced by Largo Entertainment	$8 million	$1,568,328
May 23, 1997	Behind Enemy Lines			
July 18, 1997	Ulee's Gold	co-production with Clinica Estetico and Nunez-Gowan	$2.7 million	$9,054,736
October 3, 1997	The Locusts	co-production with Renegade Films		
October 8, 1997	Gang Related	co-production with Kouf/Bigelow Productions		$5,906,773
October 17, 1997	Best Men		$4,000,000	$5,000
March 27, 1998	Storefront Hitchcock			
April 27, 1998	Music from Another Room			$118,475
October 13, 1998	Phantasm IV: Oblivion	US distribution only; produced by Starway International	$650,000	
September 24, 1999	One Man's Hero	co-production with Hool/Macdonald Productions		

== 2010s ==
Release date	Title	Co-production with	Distributor	Notes	Budget	Gross
October 4, 2013	Grace Unplugged	Roadside Attractions and Coram Deo Studios	Lionsgate		$1.7 million	$2.5 million
August 7, 2014	Vestido Pra Casar	MGM Studios, New Group Cine y TV, Raconto Produções Artísticas, and Sophia Filmes	Imagem Filmes	Brazilian film		
October 14, 2014	The Town That Dreaded Sundown	Blumhouse Productions and Ryan Murphy Productions	Orion Releasing			$120,459
December 4, 2014	Tell	Haven Entertainment, American Film Productions, Divide Pictures and Bron Studios	Orion Releasing	U.S. distribution only		
January 22, 2015	We'll Never Have Paris	Bifrost Pictures, The Bridge Finance Company, E2B Capital, H3 Films, Marc Platt Productions, PalmStar Entertainment, K5 International and Dog Eared Pictures	Orion Releasing	North American distribution only		
March 13, 2015	Night Owls	Haven Entertainment and Pan & Scan Pictures	Orion Releasing; Filmbuff	distribution only		
April 30, 2015	Entre Abelhas (A Man Amidst Bees)	MGM, Fondo Filmes, Globo Filmes and Mixer	Imagem Filmes	Brazilian film		
May 8, 2015	Winning: The Racing Life of Paul Newman	Gearhead Films, Mollette and Sontalia	Orion Releasing; Filmbuff	distribution only		
June 5, 2015	Larry Gaye: Renegade Male Flight Attendant	Night and Day Pictures	Orion Releasing	North and Latin American distribution only		$71,021
June 19, 2015	Balls Out	Ralph Smyth Entertainment and Red Productions	Orion Releasing	North and Latin American distribution only		
August 14, 2015	Fort Tilden		Orion Releasing	U.S. and Latin American theatrical and VOD distribution only		
December 4, 2015	The Wannabe	Electric Entertainment and Traction Media	Orion Releasing; Momentum Pictures	North American and select international distribution only		$272
January 8, 2016	Diablo	Diablo Movie and Space Rock Studios	Orion Releasing; Momentum Pictures	distribution only		
March 4, 2016	Ava's Possessions	ODD NY, Off Hollywood Pictures, Ravenous Films and Traction Media	Orion Releasing; Momentum Pictures	North American and select international distribution only		
March 11, 2016	Pet	Magic Lantern and Revolver Picture Company	Orion Releasing; Samuel Goldwyn Films	U.S. distribution only		$10,900
March 25, 2016	Jane Wants a Boyfriend	Copperline Creative	Orion Releasing; Filmbuff	distribution only		
May 20, 2016	Welcome to Happiness	Minutehand Pictures	Orion Releasing; Filmbuff	distribution only		$5,083
June 17, 2016	No Stranger Than Love	Pangaea Pictures and Innis Lake Entertainment	Orion Releasing; Momentum Pictures	North American distribution only		
July 1, 2016	Buddymoon	roundthecornerfudge, LLC	Orion Releasing; Gravitas Ventures	distribution only		
July 15, 2016	Outlaws and Angels	No Remake Pictures, Burnt Pictures, Redwire Pictures, Avery Productions, Casadelic Pictures and New Golden Age Films	Orion Releasing; Momentum Pictures	distribution only		
July 15, 2016	How He Fell in Love	Ibid Filmworks	Orion Releasing; Monument Releasing	North American distribution only		$8,892
July 22, 2016	Don't Worry Baby	Manamarin and The Sight Group	Orion Releasing; FilmBuff	distribution only		
August 19, 2016	Spaceman	Podium Pictures and Rhino Films	Orion Releasing; FilmBuff	distribution only		
August 19, 2016	Billionaire Ransom	Pinewood Studios	Gravitas Ventures	North and Latin American distribution only		
September 1, 2016	Summer of 8	Organically Grown Productions, Provenance Pictures and TrustFall Films	Orion Releasing; Gunpowder & Sky	distribution only		
September 9, 2016	Happy Birthday	Darko Entertainment	Orion Releasing; Momentum Pictures	distribution only	$500,000	
September 12, 2016	The People Garden	Scythia Films, Aiken Heart Films, JoBro Productions & Film Finance, Nortario Films and Vigilante Productions	Orion Releasing; Gunpowder & Sky	U.S. distribution only		
September 23, 2016	My Blind Brother	Low Spark Films, Safehouse Pictures and Think Media Studios	Orion Releasing; Starz Digital	North and Latin American distribution only		
October 28, 2016	Recovery	Diablo Entertainment and EBF Productions	Orion Releasing; Vertical Entertainment	distribution only		
November 3, 2016	My Dead Boyfriend	Cohen Media Group	Orion Releasing; Momentum Pictures	distribution only		
November 4, 2016	Trash Fire	Circle of Confusion and Snowfort Pictures	Orion Releasing; Vertical Entertainment	distribution only		
November 11, 2016	Dreamland	Beachwood Park Films and Tilt/Shift Films	Orion Releasing; Gunpowder & Sky	distribution only		
December 1, 2016	Pocket Listing	Helios Productions and Mythmaker Productions	Orion Releasing; Momentum Pictures	distribution only		
December 2, 2016	Run the Tide	1821 Pictures	Orion Releasing; Momentum Pictures	distribution only		
December 2, 2016	O Caseiro (Haunted Minds)	Nexus Cinema e Vídeo and Urano Films	BRL, Spcine and Europa Filmes	Brazilian film	$4.5 million	
December 9, 2016	Burn Country	ACE Productions	Orion Releasing; Samuel Goldwyn Films	U.S. distribution only		
January 13, 2017	Go North	Mother + Father and 77 Films	Orion Releasing; Gunpowder & Sky	distribution only		
January 27, 2017	Lost in Florence	Black Sand Pictures and Michael Mailer Films	Orion Releasing; Gunpowder & Sky	distribution only		
January 27, 2017	Get the Girl	Diablo Entertainment	Orion Releasing; Vertical Entertainment	distribution only		
February 3, 2017	Youth in Oregon	Sundial Pictures and Campfire	Orion Releasing; Samuel Goldwyn Films	U.S. distribution only		
February 17, 2017	My Name Is Emily	Newgrange Pictures, Kennedy Films, Garage Film and Paradox	Orion Releasing; Monument Releasing	North and Latin American distribution only		
March 17, 2017	The Belko Experiment	Metro-Goldwyn-Mayer, The Safran Company and Troll Court Entertainment	BH Tilt		$5 million	$11.1 million
May 5, 2017	Max 2: White House Hero	Sunswept Entertainment	Warner Bros. Pictures			
May 12, 2017	Tracktown	Bay Bridge Productions Inc., Bunkhouse Films, Good Wizard, Jay Smith Productions, Joint, Salem Street Entertainment and Wieden+Kennedy Entertainment	Orion Releasing; Samuel Goldwyn Films	distribution only		
June 2, 2017	Past Life	Metro Communications, Artomas Communications, Ars Veritas Productions, Sunshine Films and United King Films	Orion Releasing; Samuel Goldwyn Films	U.S. distribution only		
July 14, 2017	Wish Upon	Busted Shark Productions	Broad Green Pictures		$12 million	$23.5 million
August 3, 2017	The Movie of My Life	Globo Filmes, RioFilme	Vitrine Filmes	Brazilian film		
September 29, 2017	The Sound	Hackybox Pictures, North Hollywood Films and WeatherVane Productions	Orion Releasing; Samuel Goldwyn Films	U.S. distribution only		
October 5, 2017	Chocante	Casé Filmes, Globo Filmes, RioFilme	Imagem Filmes	Brazilian film		
October 25, 2017	God's Own Country	BFI, Creative England, Met Film Production, Shudder Films, Inflammable Films and Magic Bear Productions	Orion Releasing; Samuel Goldwyn Films	U.S. distribution only	£1 million	£1,061,770
October 17, 2017	Maya Dardel	The Winter Film Company, Greyshack Films and Message Film	Orion Releasing; Samuel Goldwyn Films	North American distribution only		
October 27, 2017	The Poughkeepsie Tapes		MGM Distribution Co./Scream Factory	home video release only, plastering MGM's credits		
November 3, 2017	Most Beautiful Island	Glass Eye Pix	Orion Releasing; Samuel Goldwyn Films	U.S. distribution only		
November 3, 2017	Bad Match	BoulderLight Pictures and mm2 Entertainment	Orion Releasing; Gravitas Ventures	North and Latin American distribution only		
November 10, 2017	The Price	Hacienda Motion Picture Company, Infinitum Productions, Ten on 5 Productions and Water's End Productions	Orion Releasing; Samuel Goldwyn Films	North American distribution only		
November 17, 2017	Almost Friends	Let It Play and Animus Films	Orion Releasing; Gravitas Ventures	North American distribution only		$46,376
February 23, 2018	Every Day	Metro-Goldwyn-Mayer, Likely Story and FilmWave	Orion Releasing		$4.9 million	$10.4 million
December 7, 2018	Anna and the Apocalypse	Blazing Griffin, Parkhouse Pictures and Creative Scotland	Orion Releasing	North and Latin American distribution only		$670,430
February 8, 2019	The Prodigy	Vinson Films	Orion Releasing		$6 million	$21.1 million
June 21, 2019	Child's Play	Metro-Goldwyn-Mayer and KatzSmith Productions	United Artists Releasing		$10 million	$45 million

== 2020s ==
Release date	Title	Co-production with	Distributor	Notes	Budget	Gross
January 31, 2020	Gretel & Hansel	Automatik Entertainment, Bron Studios	United Artists Releasing		$5 million	$22.1 million
August 28, 2020	Bill & Ted Face the Music	Dial 9 and Hammerstone Studios	United Artists Releasing	VOD release; distribution outside the U.K., Ireland, Australia, New Zealand and China only	$25 million	$6.3 million
March 26, 2021	Bad Trip	Gorilla Flicks, The District, and Helo	Netflix	Originally for theatrical release		
May 13, 2022	On the Count of Three	Werner Entertainment and Valparaiso Pictures	United Artists Releasing	North American distribution with Annapurna Pictures only		$62,155
July 22, 2022	Anything's Possible	Andrew Lauren Productions and Killer Films	Amazon Studios; United Artists Releasing		$10 million	
October 28, 2022	Till	Eon Productions, Whoop, Inc. and Frederic Zollo Productions	United Artists Releasing	International distribution by Universal Pictures	$20 million	$11.4 million
December 23, 2022	Women Talking**	Plan B Entertainment and Hear/Say Productions	United Artists Releasing	International distribution by Universal Pictures; last film by United Artists Releasing	$20 million	$9 million
August 25, 2023	Bottoms	Brownstone Productions	Metro-Goldwyn-Mayer	International distribution by Warner Bros. Pictures, and released by Amazon Prime Video in some countries	$11.3 million	$13.6 million
December 15, 2023	American Fiction**	MRC, T-Street Productions, Almost Infinite and 3 Arts Entertainment	Amazon MGM Studios	distribution only; first film to be distributed by Amazon MGM Studios	< $10 million	$23 million
December 13, 2024	Nickel Boys**	Plan B Entertainment, Louverture Films and Anonymous Content	Amazon MGM Studios	distribution only	$23.2 million	$3 million
September 5, 2025	Preparation for the Next Life	Plan B Entertainment and Pastel	Amazon MGM Studios		$20 million	$43,421
October 22, 2025	Hedda	Plan B Entertainment and Once and Future Productions	Amazon MGM Studios	released by Amazon Prime Video	$10 million	$15,352
May 15, 2026	Is God Is	Viva Maude	Amazon MGM Studios	distribution only	$14.8 million	$4.9 million
September 25, 2026	Your Mother Your Mother Your Mother	Two & Two Pictures	Amazon MGM Studios	distribution only		$3 million

== Upcoming films ==
Release date	Title	Notes
June 25, 2027	The Hole	distribution only; produced by Department M, Medan, Anthology Studios, K Period Media and Esmail Corp

=== Undated films ===
Release date	Title	Notes
2026	The Roots Manoeuvre	co-production with BBC Film, Plan B Entertainment and DJ Films; distributed by Amazon MGM Studios
2027	4 Kids Walk Into a Bank	North American distribution through Amazon MGM Studios only; produced by Miramax, Point Grey Pictures, Picturestart, Kinofilms, Wild Atlantic Pictures, Aperture Media Partners, Black Mask Studios and Uncle Pete Productions
2027	A Colt Is My Passport	co-production with Nikkatsu, C2 Motion Picture Group, Severn Screen and One More One Productions
TBA	Crying in H Mart	distributed by Amazon MGM Studios
TBA	Howl	co-production with Weed Road Pictures and Winter Coat Films
TBA	I Am Not Your Perfect Mexican Daughter	co-production with MACRO, Anonymous Content and Aevitas Creative Management; distributed by Amazon MGM Studios
TBA	If I Had Your Face	co-production with Concordia Studio and Hopscotch Pictures; distributed by Amazon MGM Studios
TBA	Nanny Cam	co-production with State Street Pictures
TBA	One Night Out	co-production with State Street Pictures
