= Juli Crockett =

American boxer

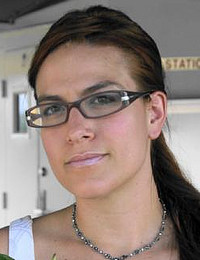
- Juli Crockett in 2008
- Born: Enterprise, Alabama, US
- Occupations: Playwright, theater director, musician, retired professional boxer

Juli Crockett is an American playwright and theater director, retired professional boxer and amateur champion, lead singer of the alternative country band The Evangenitals, ordained minister, and producer of The 1 Second Film. Born in Coffee County, Enterprise, Alabama she is the daughter of writers Linda Crockett and Daniel Savage Gray.

== Education ==
Crockett studied Theater at Pinellas County Center for the Arts in St. Petersburg, Florida, received a BFA in acting at New York University's Tisch School of the Arts (1996) and MFA in directing at the California Institute of the Arts (2001). She received her PhD in the Philosophy of Media and Communication at the European Graduate School (2013), graduating summa cum laude, also serving as Director of Alumni Relations during her time at the school. Her dissertation, "Void Creation: Theater and the Faith of Signifying Nothing" was published in 2013 by Atropos Press, New York.

Crockett recently completed an Artist in Residency at the California Institute of the Arts that focused on developing her new play Saint Simone. Her residency was completed between November and December 2015.

== Theatre ==
As a playwright/director, Crockett is best known for her adaptations of classic works of literature. Crockett has composed scores for experimental opera pieces in addition to her directing and playwright experience.

=== [or, the whale] ===
The spoken word opera [or, the whale] is an adaptation of Herman Melville's Moby-Dick written and directed by Crockett with music by composer Jeremy Zuckerman. The piece debuted in Los Angeles in 2001, was presented at the 2001 Moby Dick Conference at Hofstra University, and performed by the TENT group in Portland, Maine in 2004. In 2013 the piece was remounted for a reading with the Poor Dog Group. [or, the whale] was published in 2014 by Delere Press, Singapore, with illustrations by Ivy Maya.

=== The Dawn of Quixote: Chapter the First ===
The Dawn of Quixote: Chapter the First, an adaptation of the first chapter of Don Quixote by Miguel de Cervantes, was presented in Los Angeles at the 24th Street Theater and as part of EdgeFest Theater Festival. In 2009, it was presented at the Edinburgh Fringe Festival in Scotland.

=== Orpheus Crawling ===
Opheus Crawling, an experimental opera based on the myth of Orpheus and Eurydice, was composed by Jeremy Zuckerman, with libretto and direction by Crockett. Orpheus Crawling was workshopped at the 24th Street Theatre and premiered at the New Original Works (NOW) Fest at REDCAT in Los Angeles in August 2006.

=== History of Water ===
Crockett's original work, History of Water, premiered at the 24th Street Theater's Saturday Explorer Series on May 10, 2008 and was performed as part of the Downtown Film Festival's Sustainable LA festival. Crockett has called this piece an "environmentally minded performance piece" that was heavily influenced by her work at iO West in 2008.

History of Water and The Dawn of Quixote were also adapted into radio dramas and performed on KPFK's Pacifica Performance Showcase.

=== Cattywampus ===
Crockett composed the original "Country/Western" score for Robert Cucuzza's play Cattywampus which was workshopped at the Son of Semele Theatre in Los Angeles in 2012. Written and directed by Cucuzza, Cattywampus is an adaptation of August Strindberg's play Miss Julie, reimagining that the narrative in modern-day Appalachia.

=== Saint Simone ===
Excerpts of Crockett's new play Saint Simone now appear in the Padua Playwrights anthology "I Might Be the Person You Are Talking To" (2015).

=== Directing credits ===
- Loving (2009) by R. Murray Schafer
- Living in Boxes (2006) by Eric Layer
- Easter (2000) by August Strindberg
- Doctor & the Devil (1997) by Dylan Thomas
- In the Jungle of Cities (1996) by Bertolt Brecht
- The Shadow: a radio play on stage (1994)
- The Orgy (1995) by Enrique Buenaventura
- The Elephant Calf (1995) by Bertolt Brecht
- Dreamers (1994) by Shel Silverstein

Crockett's directing-only credits include Bertolt Brecht's In The Jungle of Cities at the Red Room in New York City, Living in Boxes at the Salvation Theater in Los Angeles, and the US Premier of R. Murray Schafer's Loving at the CalArts Modular Theater.

== Boxing ==
As an amateur boxer, Crockett was the 2000 USA Boxing Blue and Gold National Lightweight Women's Champion, defeating an active-duty Marine from Camp Pendelton at the championship tournament in Baldwin Park, California.

Crockett's brief professional boxing career ended when she retired undefeated at 3–0 (2 KO's). Her boxing career was brought to the attention of the general public in 2005, after being mentioned in several media outlets, including Sports Illustrated and US News, due to her professional connection to F.X. Toole and the film Million Dollar Baby.

== Music career ==
The Evangenitals, which Crockett co-founded with singer Lisa Dee in 2003, has earned praise from some of the media for their neo-folk style of music. The band has played at many festivals in the United States and the UK, including Lightning in a Bottle, Eagle Rock Music Festival, Lummis Day, and the Edinburgh Fringe Festival in Scotland.

Writer Colum McCann spoke in an interview of Juli Crockett and the music of the Evangenitals saying, "For pure craziness, there are lots of other bands, including one that I can't write to but I've become a big fan; they're called the Evangenitals. They're from Los Angeles. One of the front singers is a former boxer-slash-philosopher. She's a fantastic singer. Her name is Juli Crockett."

In addition to fronting The Evangenitals, Crockett has performed with Cash'd Out, a Johnny Cash tribute band, singing the June Carter parts in their stage show, folk singer Jim Kweskin, and Dorian Wood. Crockett and Lisa Dee also perform outside of the band under the name Crockett Sisters.

In October 2012 Crockett composed and recorded the title music for director Nirvan Mullick's short film Caine's Arcade which became a viral sensation on the Internet and gave birth to the non-profit Imagination Foundation.

== Personal life ==
Crockett has been married since 2013 to composer Michael Feldman. The couple have one child, son Thelonious.

== Professional boxing record ==
3 Wins (2 knockouts, 1 decisions), 0 Losses, 0 Draws
Res.	Record	Opponent	Type	Rd., Time	Date	Location	Notes
Win	3–0	(United States) Lisa Lovell	TKO	3 (4)	2002-09-26	(United States) Compaq Center, San Jose, California	Fight was scheduled for four two-minute rounds
Win	2–0	(United States) Christine Rodriguez	UD	4 (4)	2002-06-18	(United States) Thoroughbred Club, Del Mar, California	Four two-minute rounds
Win	1–0	(United States) Jocelyn Bearden	TKO	1 (4)	2001-11-30	(United States) Hilton Hotel, Reno, Nevada	Professional debut. Fight was scheduled for four two-minute rounds.
