= Harley Cross =

American actor

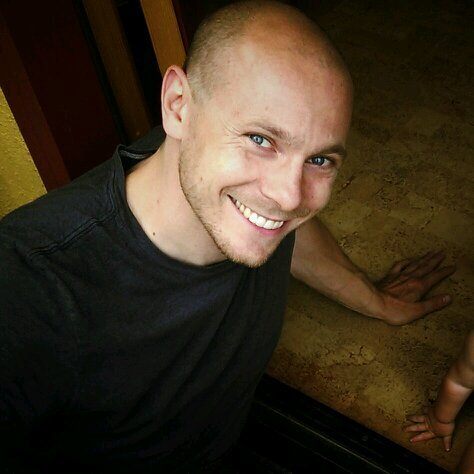
- Born: March 10, 1978 (age 48); New York City, New York, U.S.
- Other name: 1
- Occupations: Entrepreneur; actor; producer

Harley Cross (born March 10, 1978) is an American entrepreneur, film/television actor and producer.

He is the co-founder and the Director of Strategy for Land Core, a 501(c)3 non-profit founded in 2018 to advance soil health programs and policies that aim to create value for farmers, businesses, and communities.

He was previously a co-founder, CEO, and artistic director of Hint Mint Inc., a designer breath mint/candy company that was master licensed to Giftcraft LLC, a Toronto-based gift company, in 2016.

In 2015, he co-created the after-school music education program Play with Music, which focuses on bringing relevant music education to at-risk youth. The program is currently running at Allen Leroy Locke High School in South Los Angeles.

Cross was also the co-founder of Interconnected, a Los Angeles–based creative agency and production company that he started in 2011 with his friend and business partner Nirvan Mullick. Through Interconnected, Cross and Mullick produced the video Caine's Arcade and the follow-up Caine's Arcade 2. Cross and Mullick then co-founded the Imagination Foundation, a non-profit organization whose mission is to "find, foster and fund creativity and entrepreneurship in kids".

As an actor, Cross appeared in over a dozen films as well as many TV shows in the 1980s and 1990s, including cult films The Believers, Someone To Watch Over Me, The Fly II, Cohen and Tate, and the TV series Sister Kate and Dudley. His most recent roles were in the 2000 film Shriek If You Know What I Did Last Friday the Thirteenth and the 2004 film Kinsey.

Cross was also the frontman of The Harley Cross Band in the early 2000s and has recently started a new music project with Lauren Turk called The New History.

== Personal life ==
Cross is the older brother of actress Flora Cross and actor Eli Marienthal.

== Films and TV ==
- Mrs. Soffel (1984, by Gillian Armstrong) – Clarence Soffel (film debut)
- Alex: The live from a child (1986 TV movie) – Chris (ages 6 to 8)
- Where are the Children? (1986) – Michael Eldridge
- The Believers (1987, by John Schlesinger) – Chris Jamison
- Someone to Watch Over Me (1987, by Ridley Scott) – Tommy Keegan
- A Hobo's Christmas (1987 TV movie) – Bobby Grovner
- Once Again (1987 TV movie)
- Cohen and Tate (1988) – Travis Knight
- The Fly II (1989) – Martin (age 10)
- Sister Kate (1989 TV series) – Eugene Colodner
- Stanley & Iris (1990, by Martin Ritt) – Richard King
- The Boy Who Cried Bitch (1991) – Dan Love
- Law & Order (TV series) – episode "Trust" (1992) – Jamie Maser
- Dudley (1993 TV series) – Fred Bristol
- To Dance with the White Dog (1993 TV movie) – Bobby
- Crazy for a Kiss (1995 TV movie) – Ray Striker
- Touched by an Angel (TV series) – episode "The Quality of Mercy" (1996) – Marshall Redding
- Perdita Durango (1997) – Duane
- A Soldier's Daughter Never Cries (1998, by James Ivory) – Keith Carter
- Interstate 84 (2000) – Freddie
- Shriek If You Know What I Did Last Friday the Thirteenth (2000 video) – Dawson Deary
- Robbie's Brother (2001) – Robbie
- Kinsey (2004) – Young Man in Gay Bar

== Bibliography ==
- Holmstrom, John. The Moving Picture Boy: An International Encyclopaedia from 1895 to 1995, Norwich, Michael Russell, 1996, p. 398.
