= The Boy Who Cried Bitch =

- Theatrical release poster
- Directed by: Juan Jose Campanella
- Written by: Catherine May Levin
- Produced by: Catherine May Levin; Louis Tancredi
- Starring: Harley Cross; Karen Young; Jesse Bradford; J.D. Daniels; Adrien Brody; Jason Biggs; Moira Kelly
- Cinematography: Daniel Shulman
- Edited by: Darren Kloomok
- Music by: Wendy Blackstone
- Production company: Pilgrims 3 Corporation
- Distributed by: Pilgrims 3 Corporation
- Release date: October 11, 1991
- Running time: 105 minutes
- Country: United States
- Language: English

The Boy Who Cried Bitch is a 1991 American independent drama film directed by Juan Jose Campanella and starring Harley Cross, Karen Young, Jason Biggs (in his first speaking role), Jesse Bradford and Adrien Brody. It was Campanella's feature film debut. It was based on real events.

== Plot ==
The story focuses on Dan Love (Harley Cross), a young boy with misdiagnosed (or undiagnosed) mental condition(s), who slowly plunges the life of his mother, Candice (Karen Young), into unbridled chaos.

== Cast ==
- Harley Cross as Dan Love
- Karen Young as Candice Love
- Jesse Bradford as Mike Love
- J.D. Daniels as Nick Love
- Adrien Brody as Eddie
- Jason Biggs as Robert
- Moira Kelly as Jessica
- Gene Canfield as Jim Cutler
- Dennis Boutsikaris as Orin Fell
- Reathel Bean as Dr. Goldstein
- Edwina Lewis as Ann Marie, R.N.
- Ru Flynn as Ruth Nussbaum
- Kario Salem as Dr. Habib
- John Rothman as Stokes
- Samurel Wright as Richard
- Perry Moore as William
- Sean Ashby as Gene
- Chris McKenna as Ross
- Michael Miceli as Chet
- Judd Trichter as Jay
- Bruce McCarty as Gary
- Sally Kaye Kaufman as Fern
- Leslie Shenkel as Eddie's Father

== Production ==
Much of the filming was done at the McGovern residence in Bronxville.

Campanella said that the script was mostly based on the real life of screenwriter Catherine May Levin.

== Release and sequel ==
Originally exhibited at the Boston Film Festival in 1991, the film contained an alternate ending. It was never given to the MPAA for examination, and thus remains unrated.

It was followed by a semi-sequel called The Boy Who Cried Bitch: The Adolescent Years (2007), without the participation of many of the crew members of the original film, with the exception of scriptwriter Catherine May Levin.
