= The Man with the Perfect Swing =

- Directed by: Michael Hovis
- Written by: Michael Hovis
- Produced by: Angela Hovis
- Starring: James Black; Suzanne Savoy; Marco Perella; James Belcher
- Distributed by: Monarch Home Video
- Release date: August 16, 1995 (USA)
- Running time: 95 min.
- Country: United States
- Language: English

The Man with the Perfect Swing is a 1995 American comedy-drama movie written and directed by Michael Hovis.

== Synopsis ==
A passion for golf drives this story about fame, schemes and paying the bills. Having successfully failed at everything, Anthony "Babe" Lombardo rises from his couch potato life with one last hope. He invents the perfect golf swing that he believes will revolutionize the game. Determined to make it bankable, Babe frantically maneuvers amidst suspicious investors, vanishing friends and a disenchanted wife.

== Awards ==
- 1995 - Austin Film Festival - Best Film - Won

== Cast ==
- Suzanne Savoy ... Susan Lombardo
- James Belcher ... Lou Gallo
- James Monroe Black ... Anthony 'Babe' Lombardo (as James Black)
- Richard Bradshaw ... Bonelli
- William Hardy ... Scardino, Albert
- Marco Perella ... Chuck Carter
- Harold Suggs ... Father Mac
- Greg Norman ... Himself

== Reviews ==
- "A gem. The film has heart.", Louis B. Parks, The Houston Chronicle
- "An endearing tale about chasing dreams. My film pick of the week.", David Davis, The L.A. Weekly
- "Engaging comedy drama... Babe keeps the audience rooting.", Joe Leyden, Variety
- "Considerable warmth, compassion and good humor", Kevin Thomas, Los Angeles Times

== Video release ==
The film was released on video by Monarch Home Video in 1996.
