= William Bronder =

American actor

- Born: June 12, 1930; New York City, New York, U.S.
- Died: May 6, 2015 (aged 84); Los Angeles, California, U.S.
- Occupation: Actor
- Years active: 1973–2000

William Bronder (June 12, 1930 – May 6, 2015) was an American film and television actor. He first served in the U.S. Merchant Marine Academy as well as the U.S. Army’s 82nd Airborne Division. Afterwards he turned to Hollywood in the 1960s to start a film career.

Between 1973 and 2000, William Bronder appeared in seven films, about 50 television episodes and eight TV movies. He often portrayed rough working-class men in character roles. Bronder remains perhaps best known for playing unfriendly junkyard owner Milo Pressman in Rob Reiner's film Stand by Me (1986), starring Wil Wheaton and River Phoenix. His other films were Flush (1982), Cannery Row (1982), Yes, Giorgio (1982), Best Seller (1987), the short film Tummy Trouble (1989) and Return to Me (2000, in his last role as Wally Jatczak). He also appeared in a great number of television series of the 1970s and 1980s. Among them were Marcus Welby, M.D., The Streets of San Francisco, Police Story, Knots Landing, Hill Street Blues, CHiPs and MacGyver.

Bronder also raced pigeons and was a Hall of Fame member of the FVC San Fernando Valley Pigeon Club. He was married to his wife Tona from 1964 until his death in 2015. They had four children.

== Filmography ==
Year	Title	Role	Notes
1974	The Last Porno Flick	Nun / Sultan	
1982	Cannery Row	Suzy's Trick	
1982	Flush	Rosewater	
1982	Yes, Giorgio	Foreman	
1986	Stand by Me	Milo Pressman	
1987	Best Seller	Foley	
2000	Return to Me	Wally Jatczak	(final film role)
