= Marco Perella =

American character actor and author (born 1949)

- Born: May 18, 1949 (age 75); Houston, Texas, U.S.
- Occupation: Actor
- Years active: 1985–present
- Spouse: Diane Perella (1984–present)
- Children: 2

Marco Perella (born May 18, 1949) is an American character actor and author, who has played a variety of small roles in motion pictures shot in Texas.

He is best known for his role in Boyhood (2014), playing an abusive alcoholic second husband, Professor Bill Welbrock, and for his bestselling book, Adventures of A No Name Actor (2001), a humorous autobiography recounting his struggles in the acting world.

== Life and career ==
Perella was born in Houston, Texas, the son of Anthony Paul Perella and Edna Lee Drake. He studied at Stanford University, in Northern California, but left after his junior year. He then worked as a construction worker, firefighter, and musician, before auditioning for a role in West Side Story.

In 1984, he and actress Diane Perella were married in Texas. They have two children.

In the mid-1980s, Perella began to work in film and television. His debut was in Fandango (1985) starring Kevin Costner, but his scenes were cut before the theatrical release. He later took the role as a cab driver in D.O.A. (1988) starring Dennis Quaid and Meg Ryan. Other roles include a police sergeant in the made-for-TV movie Knight Rider 2000 (1991) starring David Hasselhoff, as the Mercer interrogator in Oliver Stone's JFK (1991) starring Kevin Costner, as a roadblock officer in A Perfect World (1993) starring Kevin Costner, Clint Eastwood, and Laura Dern, and as an Anglo father in Lone Star (1996) starring Matthew McConaughey and Kris Kristofferson.

Perella had a recurring role, as Cobalt, in TV's Walker, Texas Ranger (1993–1999) starring Chuck Norris; he also appeared in another episode of Walker, Texas Ranger entitled 'No Way Out' as Zeke, a mercenary working for Caleb Hooks (Michael Parks). He also worked with director Richard Linklater several times, playing Tom Watson in Fast Food Nation (2006) starring Greg Kinnear, Bruce Willis, and Catalina Sandino Moreno, as Donald in A Scanner Darkly (2006) starring Keanu Reeves, Winona Ryder, and Robert Downey Jr., and as Professor Bill Welbrock, the abusive alcoholic second husband, in Boyhood (2014) starring Ellar Coltrane, Patricia Arquette, and Ethan Hawke.

His autobiography, Adventures of A No Name Actor, in which Perella humorously recounts his struggles in the acting world, was published in 2001 and became a bestseller.

Perella lives in Onion Creek, Texas, with his wife, Diane. Besides being involved in acting, they offer on-camera acting classes and audition workshops in Austin.

== Selected filmography ==
- D.O.A. (1988) as Cab Driver
- It Takes Two (1988) as Dave
- Cohen and Tate (1988) as FBI George
- Pancho Barnes (1988) (TV movie) as Maj. Cooper
- Night Game (1989) as Color Man
- Challenger (1990) (TV movie) as Dick Methia
- Black Snow (1990) as Charlie
- A Killing in a Small Town (1990) (TV movie) as Rick Slocum
- Knight Rider 2000 (1991) (TV movie) as Police Sergeant
- A Seduction in Travis County (1991) (TV movie) as Poge
- JFK (1991) as Mercer Interrogator
- Murder in the Heartland (1993) (TV Mini-Series) as Bob Von Busch
- My Boyfriend's Back (1993) as Townsperson
- Fatal Deception: Mrs. Lee Harvey Oswald (1993) (TV movie) as 2nd Young Guy
- A Perfect World (1993) as Road Block Officer
- The Chase (1994) as Cop #2
- Shadows of Desire (1994) (TV movie) as Man #1
- Tall, Dark and Deadly (1995) (TV movie) as Waiter
- The Tuskegee Airmen (1995) (TV movie) as Col. Sirca
- The Man with the Perfect Swing (1995) as Chuck Carter
- Lone Star (1996) as Anglo Father
- Two Mothers for Zachary (1996) (TV movie) as Reporter #2
- The People Next Door (1996) (TV movie) as Simms, Manager
- Deep in the Heart (1996) as Mickey / Coach
- Keys to Tulsa (1997) as Bedford Shaw
- To Live Again (1998) (TV movie) as News Anchor
- Home Fries (1998) as Good Ol' Boy in Pickup
- Varsity Blues (1999) as Dr. Benton
- Brothers. Dogs. And God (2000) as Buddy
- Hell Swarm (2000) (TV movie) as Brad Dempsey
- Picnic (2000) (TV movie) as Police Chief
- Miss Congeniality (2000) as Starbucks Guy
- Beyond the Prairie, Part 2: The True Story of Laura Ingalls Wilder (2002) (TV movie) as Grady
- The Life of David Gale (2003) as TV Host
- No Pain, No Gain (2005) as Preppy Customer
- Friday Night Lights (2004) as Booster
- The Wendell Baker Story (2005) as Investigator
- Sin City (2005) as Skinny Dude
- The King (2005) as Chairman
- Fast Food Nation (2006) as Tom Watson
- A Scanner Darkly (2006) as Donald
- Infamous (2006) as Clifford Hope
- Elvis and Anabelle (2007) as Doctor
- Love and Mary (2007) as Vince
- Broke Sky (2007) as Paul
- Spirit Camp (2009) as Nikki's Dad
- Deep in the Heart (2012) as Fred
- This Is Where We Live (2013) as Doctor Benson
- Boyhood (2014) as Professor Bill Welbrock
- The Teller and the Truth (2015) as FBI Agent Carl Winstead
- My All American (2015) as Dr. Martin
- The Devil's Candy (2015) as Sgt. Davis
- A Room Full of Nothing (2019) as Steve

=== TV series ===
- Dangerous Curves (1992–1993) as Bruder Larry
- Walker, Texas Ranger (1993–1999) as Cobalt / Zeke
- Wishbone (1995) as Seymour LaVista
- Friday Night Lights (2008) as Big Shot
- Dallas (2013) as Mark-Oil Executive
- In an Instant (2015) as Koski's neighbor
- The Leftovers (2015) as Charlie Simpson
- American Crime (2016) as Senator Robert Butler
- Queen of the South (2016) as Sam
- The Son (2017) as Sheriff Graham
- Landman (2024−) as Hank

=== Video Games ===
- Crusader: No Remorse (1995) as Weasel
