= Suzanne Savoy =

American actress and voice artist

- Born: Wilmington, Delaware, United States
- Years active: 1986–present
- Children: 1
- Website: Solo Show Website

Suzanne Savoy is an American actress and voice artist best known for playing Victoria Robertson in Steven Soderbergh's Cinemax series The Knick and DNC Chairwoman Patricia Whittaker in House of Cards, and for her one-woman touring show Je Christine about late-Medieval author Christine de Pizan. She appears in and does voice-overs for many commercials, and has roles ranging from minor to starring in both film and television. Savoy appears on the Breaking Bad fan site as lawyer Perry Trivedi in the award-winning prequel series, Better Call Saul.

== Early life ==
Suzanne Hélène Savoy was born in Wilmington, Delaware, the daughter of Jean Dawson Savoy and Prew Savoy. The family relocated to the town of Iberville in the province of Québec, Canada, when she was five years old. She and her sister Jeanette ("Jeanie") were weekly boarders at the Convent of the Sacred Heart in Montreal while their younger sister Alexis remained in Iberville to be schooled in French. Summer vacations and holidays were spent at the shore in Rehoboth Beach, Delaware, with their maternal grandparents, Ella and Ralph Dawson. Savoy attended CEGEP at Sir George Williams University, since renamed Concordia University.

== Design Work ==
A graduate of National Theatre School of Canada's Design Program, her set design for Goldoni's The Boors was selected by the head of the program, designer François Barbeau, to be displayed at the 1975 Prague Quadrennial of Performance Design and Space. Savoy has designed and/or built costumes and puppets for various theaters in Canada and the United States, including the Groupe Nouvel'Aire in Montreal, Persephone Theatre in Saskatoon, Gryphon Theatre in Ontario, and NYC's The Shakespeare Project and Bloodstone Theatrical.

== Performing career ==
Savoy began her acting career after moving to Houston in her late twenties. She studied at The Royal National Theatre of Great Britain and various other schools and colleges including the University of Houston as a guest of the Director of UH's School of Theatre, Dr. Sidney Berger. She quickly established herself as a full-time working actor in Texas through her voice-over and commercial work as well as supporting and starring roles in film, co-starring and principal roles on TV, and stage work at venues such as regional theaters The Dallas Theater Center and The Alley Theatre, at The Houston Shakespeare Festival, Stages Repertory Theatre and Main Street Theater in Houston. In 1986 she co-founded Mercury Studio, which provided on-camera training for Houston actors until 2005. Having moved to New York City in 1995 with her daughter following divorce, Suzanne became a mainstay of Scott Cargle's The Shakespeare Project, which toured NYC's parks and public spaces. She variously performed, designed sets and costumes, built puppets, and created and ran TSP's education division over a period of nine years. In 2005, Suzanne moved to Harlem and continued her work appearing in and doing voice-overs in numerous national commercials. She has performed on a number of New York stages; Metropolitan Playhouse's production of Sinclair Lewis' Dodsworth, in which she appeared as Edith Cortright, received an Aggie Award for Best Ensemble.

After a hiatus from film and TV while raising her daughter, she resumed work in those media. In 2013, Savoy was cast as DNC Chairwoman Patti Whittaker in the first season of the Netflix series House of Cards. Two days after she wrapped, she began receiving chemotherapy and radiation treatments for stage four colorectal cancer. Given a clean bill of health less than a year later, she was cast as matriarch Victoria Robertson in Steven Soderbergh's The Knick, which shot for two seasons. Savoy subsequently appeared in Seasons 4 and 5 of House of Cards. While her home base is in Harlem, she also spends time in Los Angeles for work and visiting her daughter, who now resides in LA and works as a screenwriter and director.

=== Comedy and Improv ===
Savoy studied at NYC's Upright Citizen's Brigade and went on to co-found indy teams Lascivious Jones, Tonya, and Wasp. Actress and comedian Nicole Byer was a teammate and co-founder of Lascivious Jones. Savoy appeared in TV roles for The Onion and UCB Comedy Shorts, and has worked repeatedly in sketches on Last Week Tonight With John Oliver.

=== One-Woman Show ===
Je Christine is a 90-minute live presentation of the life and works of France's first professional female author, Christine de Pizan. Savoy translated de Pizan's works from 14th/15th-Century French manuscripts and created and performs the piece at universities, libraries, museums, and other non-traditional venues. Long-time collaborator Bill Burford, who co-founded Mercury Studio with Savoy, directed the show.

=== Music ===
Savoy and band-mate Joe Silver formed the duo Bespoke, which hosted a bi-monthly open mic night for ukulelists at Grill on the Hill in Harlem; they also founded and hosted the Uke Rumble variety nights at Parkside Lounge on Houston Street in NYC. Bespoke performed covers and original songs on acoustic and electric uke. Joe Silver died in July 2020 of glioblastoma.

=== Covid Relief Program ===
In March 2020 when Covid19 forced libraries to close their doors to the public, Lewes Public Library in lower Delaware contacted Savoy to create an online program to help relieve the isolation of their adult membership, mostly retirees. Lunchtime Short Story Readings for Adults has been a popular regular event curated, produced, directed, and hosted by Ms. Savoy twice weekly throughout the duration of the pandemic. Attendees from around the world listen, discuss, and chat in a non-political forum. A virtual "Catbird Seat Award" is presented at the end of each reading to one or more attendees for arbitrary reasons of merit, along with "five hundred ‘library dollars’ to spend at the library of their choice."

== Personal life ==
Savoy was married to James Black (actor and interim Artistic Director of The Alley Theatre) for seven years; they have one daughter, screenwriter/director Bonnie Savoy Black. Suzanne Savoy works bi-coastally, lives in Manhattan, and owns a second home in lower Delaware, close to her sisters' families.

== Filmography ==
=== Television Roles ===
- Law & Order - Christina Burch, "Unintended Consequences" (2024)
- Full Circle - Kristin McCusker, 6 episodes, (2023; miniseries)
- For Life - Judge Gina Sorensen, 5 episodes, (2020)
- SMILF - Mrs. Waterstein, "Surrogate Mothers Inspire Loving Families" (2019)
- NCIS - Rachel Brentwood, "Beneath the Surface" (2018)
- Better Call Saul - Perry Trivedi, recurring (2016, 2018)
- Red Oaks - Adelaide, "Old Flames" (2016)
- Last Week Tonight With John Oliver - Executive, Reporter #3, Mother (2014-2016)
- I Love You...But I Lied - Lydia, "Cougar/Hired" (2015)
- How to Get Away With Murder - Judge Kathy Powell, Pilot (2014)
- The Knick - Victoria Robertson, recurring (2014-2015)
- House of Cards - Patricia Whittaker, recurring (2013-2018)
- Boardwalk Empire - Mrs. Pendergast, "Resolution" (2012)
- 30 Rock - Maternity Photographer, "¡Qué Sopresa!" (2011)
- UCB Comedy Originals - Mom, "Trip Tips: Family Holiday Guilt Trips (2009)
- Onion News Network - Countess Stephania Isabella De Uster, "Bad Boy Fencing Star Implicated in Yet Another Jewel Heist (2009)
- Six Degrees - Woman Passenger, "Ray's Back" (2007)
- Sex and the City - Elaine, "20-Something Girls vs. 30-Something Women" (1998)
- Heaven Help Us: The Belles' Farewell - Sandra (1994)
- The Fire Next Time - Jackie (1993; TV movie)
- Dangerous Curves (TV series) - Suzie Aames, "Let Us Prey" (1993)
- Walker, Texas Ranger - Cathy Sant, "Storm Warning" (1993)
- Trial: The Price of Passion - Melissa Mills (1992; TV movie)
- Finding the Way Home - Sandy Mittelmann (1991; TV movie)
- In Broad Daylight - News Reporter (1991; TV movie)
- America's Most Wanted - Joy Aylor (1991)
- Jailbirds - Grace (1991; TV movie)
- Miller & Muller - Bonnie Miller, Title Role, Mini-series, 8 Episodes (1991)
- Little Girl Lost - Dr. Deborah Meewsen (1988; TV movie)

=== Movie Roles ===
- Plan B - Diane Cassidy (2024)
- The Upside - Charlotte (2017)
- Louder Than Bombs - Documentary Voice-over, uncredited (2015)
- Freeheld - Town Clerk (2015)
- Honey Flood - Lady Pamela (2016)
- The Undiscovered Country - Kathy (2017)
- The Cloud - Carmen Rosenthal (2014)
- Detention (2013/III) - Teacher (2013)
- An Inappropriate Affect - Dr. Regina Larose (2013)
- Safe - Furious Woman (2012)
- The Best and the Brightest - Chapin Headmistress (2010)
- Dare - Deirdre Walker (2009)
- The Sixth Sense - Social Worker, deleted scene (1999)
- Zero Woman: Dangerous Game - Rei (English dub) (1998)
- The Bondage Master - Rumi (English dub) (1998)
- Beautiful Killing Machine - Dr. Kyoko Hakami (English dub) (1996)
- Close Your Eyes and Hold Me - Hanabusa (English dub) (1996)
- The Man with the Perfect Swing - Susan Lombardo (1995)
- Zero Woman: Final Mission - Rei (English dub) (1995)
- Beautiful Beast - Mei Fan (English dub) (1995)
- On Board Amtrak (Amtrak promotional film) - Suzan Peterson (1994)
- The Trust - Alice Graham Baker (1993)
- Shadow Force - Waitress (1992)
- Hard Promises - Gameshow Wife (1991)
- Rush - Dodd's Wife (1991)
- I Come in Peace - Policewoman (1990)
- The Cellar - Emily Cashen (1989)
- Cohen and Tate - Martha Knight (1988)
- Into the Spider's Web - The Spider Lady (1988)
- Vasectomy: A Delicate Matter - Jackie (1986)
- The American Way - Brunette (1986)

=== Voice Roles ===
==== Anime Roles ====
- Agent Aika - Nena Hargen
- Alien from the Darkness - Captain Sara
- Alien Nine - Principal
- Angel Sanctuary - Alexiel
- Animation Runner Kuromi - Hamako Shihonmatsu
- Descendants of Darkness - Maria's Mother (Ep. 3-4)
- Garzey's Wing - Rumiko
- Geobreeders: Breakthrough - Ayumi Narusawa, Beauty Bakeneko
- Hyper Speed GranDoll - Miki Amagi
- Maze - Rapier
- Midnight Panther - Sonya
- Photon: The Idiot Adventures - Aho Furnace, Keyne Aqua, Operator
- RG Veda - Kuyoh
- Shamanic Princess - Lena, Princess (Ep. 6)
- Sins of the Sisters - Rika
- Spy of Darkness - Vanessa

==== Video Game Roles ====
- Crusader: No Remorse - Maj. Jo Anne Vargas
