= Cohen and Tate =

1989 film by Eric Red

- Theatrical release poster
- Directed by: Eric Red
- Screenplay by: Eric Red
- Based on: "The Ransom of Red Chief" by O. Henry (Uncredited)
- Produced by: Antony Rufus-Isaacs; Jeff Young
- Starring: Roy Scheider; Adam Baldwin; Harley Cross
- Cinematography: Victor J. Kemper
- Edited by: Edward M. Abroms
- Music by: Bill Conti
- Production companies: Nelson Entertainment; New Galactic; Tate Productions
- Distributed by: Hemdale Film Corporation
- Release date: January 27, 1989
- Running time: 86 minutes
- Country: United States
- Language: English
- Budget: $5.5 million
- Box office: $64,227 (United States)

Cohen and Tate (also known as Cohen & Tate) is a 1989 American thriller film written and directed by Eric Red and starring Roy Scheider, Adam Baldwin and Harley Cross. It was Red's feature film debut. The film is considered as a cinematic version of O. Henry's short story "The Ransom of Red Chief".

== Plot ==
Two professional assassins are sent to kidnap a 9-year-old boy named Travis Knight (Harley Cross), who is under the United States Federal Witness Protection Program in Oklahoma after witnessing a mob killing in Texas. Cohen (Roy Scheider) is an older, jaded assassin with a little bit of humanity still in him. Tate (Adam Baldwin) is a younger, hotheaded and psychopathic killer.

The two hitmen assassinate the boy's parents and the agent who protected them with the help of another agent who lets them get in the house and then runs away. They capture Travis and drive him away to see their boss in Houston. When Travis learns this from Cohen, he takes advantage of a rising antagonism between his hijackers to further tangle and pit one against the other in order to survive. They hear on the radio that the boy's father survived the attack and is only injured.

When his captors are distracted Travis escapes and is soon picked up by an Oklahoma Highway Patrol trooper, who is later shot in the head by Cohen while he's driving. Once again they capture Travis and hear on the radio that the police are after their trail. Tate wants to get rid of Travis but Cohen does not. They suddenly find a roadblock ahead and manage to escape by threatening to kill Travis and blowing up the police patrols.

They swap cars with a passing driver after Tate uses brass knuckles to knock him out. Cohen suddenly stops driving and parks beside a mailbox. Without saying a word, with an expression of grief (coming from the suspicion of what could be his last job), he sends part of his payment and his money clip in a letter to his wife. Travis finally manages to turn his captors on each other, when he realizes that Tate is about to shoot the sleepy Cohen while he is driving. He shouts at Cohen, warning him. This enrages Tate, who calls Travis a liar. Travis spits at Tate, and when Tate tries to harm him, he gets shot and chucked out of the moving car by Cohen, who later stows his body in the trunk.

A stop at the gas station leaves an overly curious attendant getting shot through a glass door after he sees blood coming out of the car's trunk while attempting to call for help. Cohen goes to check on Tate only to be attacked on by his now-enraged and still-alive partner, who springs out of the trunk and batters Cohen senseless. He reveals himself to have been wearing a bulletproof vest. Travis manages to drive the car away from Tate and hide among pump jacks and oil tanks in an oil field. Cohen reappears and handcuffs Travis to his wrist. Tate stalks them in the dark. When Cohen moves abruptly to shoot where he thinks Tate is, he loses his hearing aid. Travis finds it but hesitates about speaking out. Cohen looks at Travis with fear in his eyes, and pleads for help. Travis gives him the hearing aid and Cohen thanks him. While escaping, Tate suddenly comes out and shoots Cohen, who takes a round to the shoulder and appears to pass out. Tate advances on Travis before being shot by Cohen, causing him to fall beneath an oil pump jack and be splattered everywhere by the equipment.

When he gets to Houston, Cohen is cornered on the highway by the police and considers shooting Travis, but the boy lets him know that he cannot do it and they both know it. Cohen collides with a highway roadblock in his last attempt to escape, and the car breaks in Houston's downtown. Absolutely cornered by the police, Cohen holds Travis close to him, cocks his gun, and asks him: "How old are you, kid?" Travis answers, "Nine". While looking up, Cohen says, "Nine, huh? How about that?" and shoots himself through the throat, dying instantly.

== Cast ==
- Roy Scheider as Cohen
- Adam Baldwin as Tate
- Harley Cross as Travis Knight
- Cooper Huckabee as Jeff Knight
- Suzanne Savoy as Martha Knight
- Marco Perella as FBI Agent George
- Tom Campitelli as FBI Agent Fred
- Andy Gill as FBI Agent Roy (as Andrew R. Gill)
- Frank Bates as Highway Patrolman

== Production ==
Cohen & Tate was originally released by Hemdale Film Corporation and Nelson Entertainment, who also backed the film's production along with New Galactic. This is New Galactic's only production to date. Nelson was dissolved sometime in the early 1990s, with part of their holdings sold to New Line Cinema. Many of their back catalog titles have been released on DVD by MGM.

In the commentary track for the Blu-ray release of the film, Eric Red explains that one of the influences for his work in Cohen & Tate was John Ford, citing in particular Ford's classic film The Searchers (1956).

== DVD release and Shout! Factory restoration ==
Eric Red had stated for years that a DVD edition of the film was amongst his closest and most desired projects.

On July 9, 2013, Cohen and Tate was released on DVD by Shout! Factory. The Blu-ray Disc has a complete restoration of audio and video, and includes "A Look Back at Cohen & Tate", a short featurette that offers interviews with writer/director Eric Red, as well as editor Edward Abroms, cinematographer Victor J. Kemper and co-stars Kenneth McCabe and Harley Cross. It also includes a commentary track for the film by Red.
