= Dudley (TV series) =

- Genre: Sitcom
- Created by: Susan Beavers
- Starring: Dudley Moore; Joanna Cassidy; Harley Cross; Max Wright
- Composer: Dudley Moore
- Country of origin: United States
- Original language: English
- No. of seasons: 1
- No. of episodes: 6 (1 unaired)

Production
- Executive producers: Susan Bevers; Allan McKeown
- Camera setup: Multi-camera
- Running time: 30 minutes
- Production companies: WitzEnd Productions; 20th Television; CBS Productions

Original release
- Network: CBS
- Release: April 16 – May 14, 1993

Dudley is an American sitcom television series starring Dudley Moore (in his episodic TV debut) and Joanna Cassidy. The series premiered on April 16, 1993, on CBS, temporarily replacing Major Dad on Friday nights. It was canceled on May 14, 1993, with one episode remaining unaired.

== Synopsis ==
The series focuses on the "forced" cohabitation between Dudley Bristol, a mature divorced cabaret pianist, and his 14-year-old son Fred.

== Cast ==
- Dudley Moore as Dudley Bristol
- Joanna Cassidy as Laraine Bristol
- Harley Cross as Fred Bristol
- Max Wright as Paul
- Joel Brooks as Harold Krowten
- Lupe Ontiveros as Marta

== Episodes ==
No.	Title	Directed by	Written by	Original release date	Prod. code
1	"It Was a Wonderful Life"	Ellen Falcon	Susan Beavers	April 16, 1993	001
2	"Call Me Irresponsible"	Ellen Falcon	Ron Burla	April 23, 1993	004
3	"Off the Record"	Ellen Falcon	Ron Burla	April 30, 1993	006
4	"Whose Therapy Is It, Anyway?"	Ellen Falcon	Ellen Sandler & Cindy Elias	May 7, 1993	005
5	"Learnin' the Blues"	Ellen Falcon	Susan Beavers	May 14, 1993	003
6	"Round One"	Ellen Falcon	Phill Lewis	Unaired	002

== Awards ==
- 1993 Emmy Awards Nominee – Graphic design and title sequences – William B. Pittard, Frances Schifrin, Jennifer Grey Berkowitz, Darin Kirchne
- 1993 Emmy Awards Nominee – Lighting direction (electronic), comedy series – George Spiro Dibie, Kim Killingsworth
