= Carter DeHaven (producer) =

American film producer, director and editor (1932–2026)

- Born: January 16, 1932; Los Angeles, California, U.S.
- Died: July 3, 2026 (aged 94); Los Angeles, California, U.S.
- Other names: Carter De Haven; Carter De Haven III
- Occupations: Producer; assistant director; editor
- Years active: 1955–1990
- Notable work: Hoosiers
- Family: Gloria DeHaven (aunt); Carter DeHaven (paternal grandfather)

Carter De Haven III (February 16, 1932 – July 3, 2026) was an American film producer, television assistant director and editor known for such films as Dead Heat on a Merry-Go-Round, Hoosiers, The Exorcist III and Best Seller. He was a nephew of actress Gloria DeHaven.

DeHaven died at UCLA West Valley Medical Center in Los Angeles, California, on July 3, 2026. He was 94 years old.

== Filmography ==
=== Producer ===
- 1966: Dead Heat on a Merry-Go-Round
- 1969: A Walk with Love and Death
- 1970: The Kremlin Letter
- 1971: The Last Run
- 1972: Ulzana's Raid
- 1973: The Outfit
- 1975: Operation Daybreak
- 1978: The Seniors
- 1980: Make Me an Offer
- 1981: Carbon Copy
- 1983: Yellowbeard
- 1984: Scandalous
- 1985: Maxie
- 1986: Hoosiers
- 1987: Best Seller
- 1990: The Exorcist III
- 1993: Leslie Nielsen's Bad Golf Made Easier (Video)

=== Assistant director ===
Carter DeHaven assistant director credits
| Year | Title | Notes | Ref. |
|---|---|---|---|
| 1958 | Schlitz Playhouse | 1 episode | |
| 1958 | Mike Hammer | 1 episode | |
| 1959 | M Squad | 1 episode | |
| 1959–1960 | Riverboat | 4 episodes | |
| 1959–1961 | The Deputy | 4 episodes | |
| 1959–1962 | Tales of Wells Fargo | 16 episodes | |
| 1959–1963 | Wagon Train | 13 episodes | |
| 1960 | Bachelor Father | 1 episode | |
| 1960 | Overland Trail | 2 episodes | |
| 1960 | Johnny Midnight | 5 episodes | |
| 1960–1961 | The Tall Man | 4 episodes | |
| 1960–1961 | Alfred Hitchcock Presents | 6 episodes | |
| 1960–1962 | Thriller | 11 episodes | |
| 1960–1962 | Checkmate | 7 episodes | |
| 1961–1962 | Frontier Circus | 3 episodes | |
| 1961–1962 | Laramie | 3 episodes | |
| 1962 | Alcoa Premiere | 1 episode | |
| 1962 | Wide Country | 1 episode | |
| 1962–1963 | The Virginian | 5 episodes | |
| 1963 | Under the Yum Yum Tree | Theatrical film | |
| 1963 | McHale's Navy | 1 episode | |
| 1963 | The Alfred Hitchcock Hour | 4 episodes | |
| 1963 | Kraft Suspense Theatre | 1 episode | |
| 1963 | Bob Hope Presents the Chrysler Theatre | 1 episode | |
| 1969 | Backtrack! | Theatrical film | |
