= Imagination Foundation =

Non-profit organization

- Formation: 2012; 14 years ago
- Type: Non-profit organization
- Location: Los Angeles, CA, United States
- Region served: Worldwide
- Website: imagination.org

The Imagination Foundation is an American non-profit organization that primarily works at developing children's skills.

== History ==
Nirvan Mullick and Harley Cross founded the Imagination Foundation in 2012, inspired by the response to Mullick's short film Caine's Arcade. Imagination Foundation received initial seed funding from the Goldhirsh Foundation.

The foundation's first program was the Global Cardboard Challenge. The program launched a second short film by Mullick called Caine's Arcade 2: From a Movie to a Movement, which was posted online in September 2012, and ended by advertising Global Cardboard Challenge.

Mullick received the 2012 Big Ideas Fest Innovation in Action Award and the Dan Eldon Creative Activist Award from the Creative Visions Foundation. In 2012, Mullick spoke at Mattress Firm's National "Bed Talks" event, leading to a partnership for the 2013 Global Cardboard Challenge. Mullick and Cross continued to run the organization until bringing on a full-time Executive Director, Mike McGalliard in May 2013. In 2014, the Imagination Foundation was featured in the Ashoka and Lego Foundation "Re-Imagine Learning Challenge".

== Programs ==
The Global Cardboard Challenge is an annual challenge that invites kids to build things using cardboard and recycled materials. It culminates in a global "Day of Play" where communities display the children's cardboard creations.

In 2014, Imagination Foundation partnered with the National Head Start Association and Lakeshore Learning to launch a national campaign to bring STEM education to pre-school children. The partnership was announced at the Clinton Global Initiative America with a 3-year commitment to engage 30,000 pre-school children in early STEM education.

== Partnerships with national business ==
In 2014, Focus Features and Laika's The Boxtrolls helped to promote that year's Cardboard Challenge. That same year, Reddit partnered with Imagination Foundation by making the 3rd annual Global Reddit Day of Service on the same day as the 3rd annual Global Cardboard Challenge's Day of Play.
