= The 1 Second Film =

American non-profit collaborative art project

- The 1 Second Film flier
- Directed by: Nirvan Mullick
- Produced by: Collaboration Foundation
- Running time: 61 minutes
- Country: United States
- Language: English
- Budget: US$1 million (intended)

The 1 Second Film is an American non-profit collaborative art project which began as a student project by Nirvan Mullick in 2001. Receiving contributions from thousands of people around the world, including many celebrities, the project is currently dormant.

The film is built around one second of animation (composed of 12 large collaborative paintings), and is followed by one hour of credits, listing everyone who signs up (regardless of whether a contribution is made or not). A feature-length "making of" documentary will play alongside the credits.

The project allows people around the world to participate online, and lists everyone who joins the crew as "Special Thanks" in the film credits. The production relies on crowd funding to raise the budget; everyone who donates or raises US$1 or more gets their name listed as a Producer in the film's credits. The production also gives a Publicist credit to crew members who refer at least one friend. The film has over 56,000 crew members from 158 countries.

In 2016, the director, Nirvan Mullick, posted an update on the project. He stated it had been dormant, being put on the "back burner" in 2012, but he planned to revive it shortly. As of 2026 this has yet to occur. By January 2019, the project's website was offline entirely due to a database corruption.

== Production ==
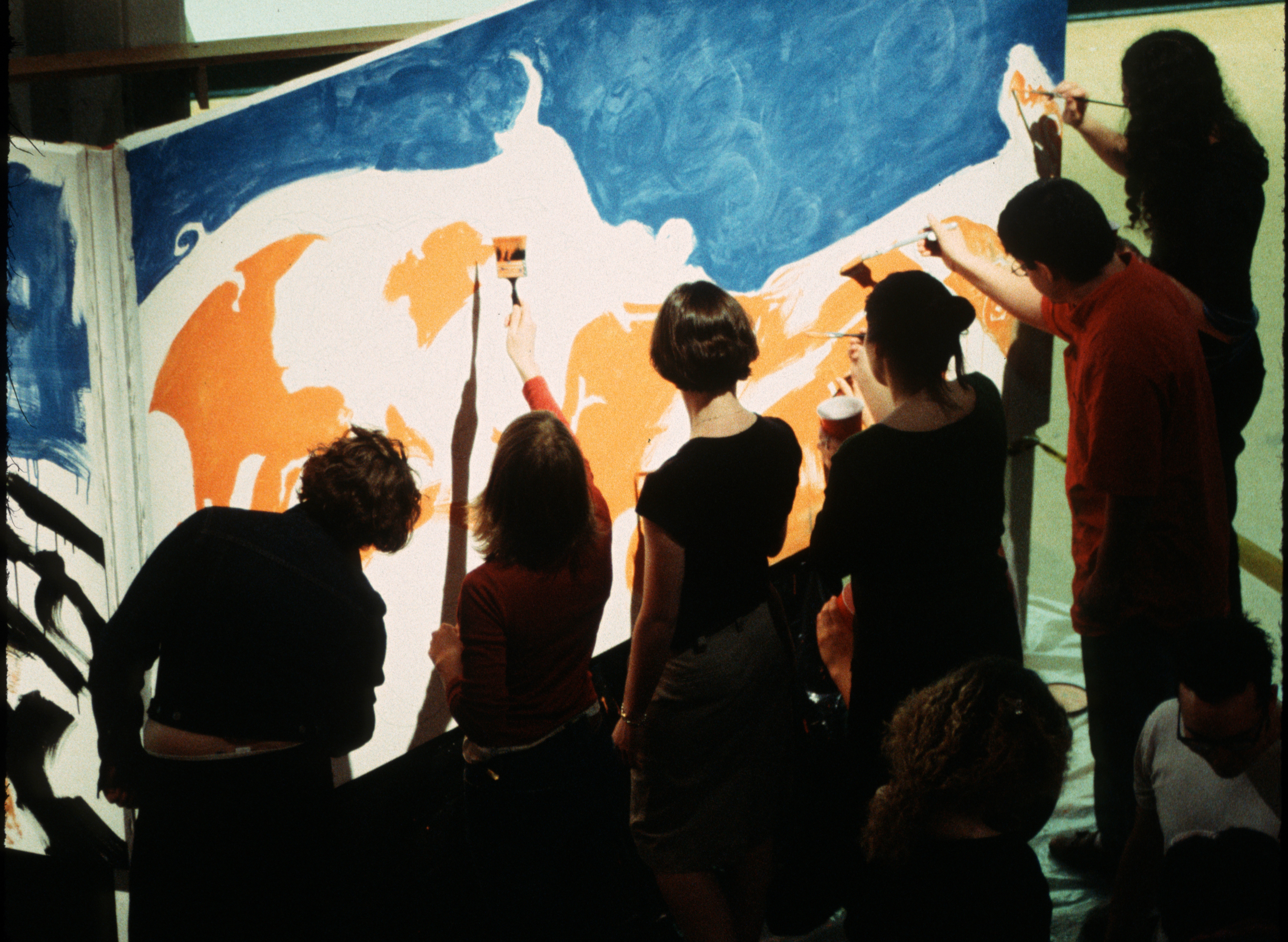
Participants paint one frame of The 1 Second Film's animation during a party.

The title of The 1 Second Film derives from the fact that the animation at the core of the film project is just one second long (24 frames). The animation consists of 12 large frames (9 ft x 5 ft paintings). The frames were painted by hundreds of people during a multi-disciplinary event on March 8, 2001 (International Women's Day) at California Institute of the Arts. The event included live-performers and musicians; people attending the event were invited to help paint the frames of animation. Each frame had an art director that engaged the audience as participants; color design for the animation was selected by Jules Engel. Each of the 12 paintings is filmed twice (on 70 mm film) to create the 24 frames in one second of film.

The one second of animation will be immediately followed by an estimated one hour of end credits. Alongside the credits will be a feature-length documentary on the creation of the artwork.

The film is being crowd-funded by public donations. Donors are to receive a Producer credit in the film for a minimum of $1.00. Producers are to be listed in order of amount donated.

== Project history ==
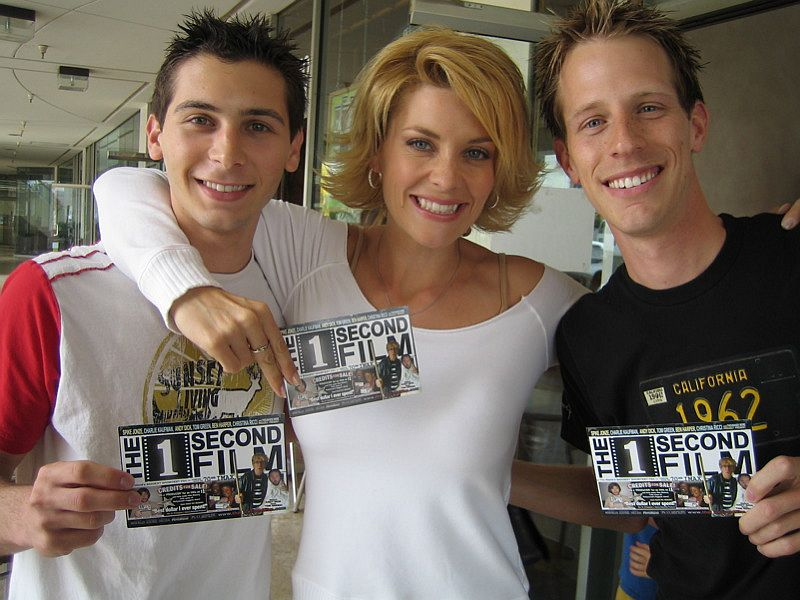
Justin Berfield, McKenzie Westmore, and Jason Felts each holding a producer credit for The 1 Second Film.

The 1 Second Film began as a student project by Nirvan Mullick in 2001 while at California Institute of the Arts. The director set out to create a collaborative art project that would bring his school together, and later expanded the project after the success of the initial event. Seed funds for the animation painting event came from a $1,500 CalArts Grant, an additional $3,000 was raised by selling producer credits for donations of $1 or more. In 2004, after graduating and finishing two other animated short films, the director began fundraising to expand The 1 Second Film project by selling $1 producer credits on the streets of Los Angeles. After raising enough to buy a video camera, the director began to document the fundraising process to include as part of a documentary about the project. In 2005, after getting several celebrities to donate, the director launched a petition drive along with the help of Stephen Colbert to get the credits of The 1 Second Film listed on the Internet Movie Database. In March 2005, IMDb began listing the credits. The IMDb listing helped the project to grow online. In May 2006, a video of several high-profile celebrities donating to The 1 Second Film was featured on the homepage of YouTube, helping the project raise over $7,000 in four days. In 2007, the project's first automated website was built to give community profiles to all participants, allowing for the project to scale up. The film's failure to materialize to date has led to speculation of fraud.

=== IMDb controversy ===
The director of The 1 Second Film submitted the celebrity producer credits of The 1 Second Film to the Internet Movie Database. After being rejected, the director sent a link to a video of Stephen Colbert requesting his $11 producer credit be listed on IMDb. IMDb then began to list all of The 1 Second Film's credits, including unknowns who donated $1 or more to the project online. Thousands of people began to discover the film title under the production credits of the various celebrities involved. The project spread online, attracting donations from around the world. Several celebrities also donated online, including Jonah Hill and Ryan Reynolds. The IMDb listing reached over 3,000 producers. Due to the high volume of submissions, IMDb replaced all of the film's individual producer credits with a single credit for "Producers of The 1 Second Film". The entire project was later removed from IMDb. Jon Reeves, head of data acquisition at IMDb, released a statement calling the project a "performance art project (rather) than an actual film".

== Celebrity producers ==
A variety of celebrities have donated to become producers of the project. Producers include:

- Tom Arnold
- Kevin Bacon
- Michel Barrette
- Tyson Beckford
- Ed Begley Jr.
- Zoë Bell
- Justin Berfield
- Selma Blair
- Jesse Bradford
- Pierce Brosnan
- Steve Buscemi
- Bobby Cannavale
- Robert Carradine
- Michael Cera
- Stephen Colbert
- Steve Coogan
- Coolio
- James Cromwell
- Alan Cumming
- Andy Dick
- Richard Edson
- Atom Egoyan
- Rick Fox
- Patrick Fugit
- Michel Gondry
- Seth Green
- Tom Green
- Elliott Gould
- Ben Harper
- John Hawkes
- Chad Hurley
- Spike Jonze
- Tony Kanal
- Charlie Kaufman
- David LaChapelle
- John Leguizamo
- Sam Longoria
- Don McKellar
- Mark McKinney
- B. J. Novak
- Bob Odenkirk
- Todd Oldham
- Stacy Peralta
- Drew Pinsky
- Bill Pullman
- Brett Ratner
- Christina Ricci
- Jason Ritter
- Mark Ruffalo
- Pauly Shore
- Ron Sparks
- Kiefer Sutherland
- Nia Vardalos
- Kanye West
- McKenzie Westmore

Contributors also include former YouTube CEO Chad Hurley, YouTube stars including iJustine and Brookers, as well as Kyle MacDonald from One red paperclip.
