= Nelson Entertainment =

American film production company

- Company type: Subsidiary of Nelson Holdings International, Ltd.
- Industry: Film home video
- Predecessor: Galactic Films; Spikings Corporation; Magnetic Video
- Founded: 1985; 41 years ago
- Founders: Barry Spikings; Richard Northcott
- Defunct: 1991; 35 years ago
- Fate: Renamed Sultan Entertainment and sold to New Line Cinema, library later purchased by Epic Productions
- Successor: Company: New Line Cinema; Library: Metro-Goldwyn-Mayer (through Orion Pictures) (with some exceptions)
- Headquarters: Los Angeles, California, United States
- Area served: Worldwide
- Key people: Barry Spikings; Richard Northcott
- Products: Motion pictures VHS; Laserdisc
- Parent: Nelson Holdings International, Ltd. (1986–1991); New Line Cinema (1991)
- Divisions: Nelson Films; New Galactic and Tate; Charter Entertainment

Nelson Entertainment (also known as Nelson Entertainment Group) was a Los Angeles-based film production and home video distribution company, a subsidiary of Nelson Holdings International Ltd., a Vancouver, Canada, holding company formed in 1985 by British film producer Barry Spikings and Richard Northcott, a British financier who amassed his fortune from a chain of hardware and furniture stores. In 1991, it was renamed Sultan Entertainment and sold to New Line Cinema, with its library later purchased by Epic Productions.

== History ==
The company acquired Galactic Films as well as Spikings Corporation in 1985, then later acquired distribution rights to a majority of Embassy titles after purchasing its home video division, which Nelson paid $85 million for, and then signed an agreement with Columbia Pictures which enabled Nelson to finance their films for Columbia. The company would buy out Autovend Technology Corp, which specialized in vending machines holding up to 400 videotapes for sale or rental, in September 1986, with John Lack, a former executive of Warner-Amex Satellite Entertainment, hired to run the Autovend technology.

On November 26, 1986, Nelson decided to form a foreign sales arm, Nelson International, Inc. Ian Jessel, formerly an executive at CBS Theatrical Films, was named president of the unit.

On March 18, 1987, Nelson Entertainment, through its Embassy Home Entertainment division inked a pact with Hemdale Film Corporation, to co-produce 10 pictures in a co-financing agreement between Hemdale and Nelson; Nelson would receive domestic home video rights, while Hemdale retained all other rights to the 10 pictures.

Throughout the summer of 1987, Embassy/Nelson announced more international distribution deals, including West German video distributor Neue Constantin Film and Nippon Herald in Japan. Elsewhere, Nelson decided to intervene in the Hemdale Film Corporation-Vestron Video lawsuit over video rights to a package of 12 Hemdale films; Nelson then subsequently filed for rights to the same 12 pictures under almost identical terms as the arrangement Vestron was trying to have enforced, and the deal added another film to the mix, High Tide.

Sometime in August 1987, Embassy Home Entertainment was renamed Nelson Entertainment, but retained the earlier brand as well as Charter Entertainment for sell-through products. Nelson then financed a deal with Castle Rock Entertainment to co-produce their films, and in addition handle the international distribution rights.

In September 1988, Orion Home Video became Nelson's sales agent; in addition, Orion Pictures would later theatrically distribute a few of Nelson's titles. By February 1989, Orion was the official home video distributor of Nelson product.

In 1991, Nelson Entertainment sold its home video division to New Line Cinema and it was rebranded as New Line Home Video. The company was later renamed Sultan Entertainment and was acquired by New Line, who then later took over the video rights to the library. This merger also meant Nelson's video rights changed hands, as RCA/Columbia Pictures Home Video began distributing former Embassy and Nelson videos via their distribution pact with New Line. By 1994, Nelson's catalog had been acquired by Epic Productions and folded into the Alpha Library Company. After Epic's closure, Crédit Lyonnais assumed responsibility of its library. The library was put up for auction by the Consortium de Realisation as the "Epic library". Credit Lyonnais later sold the Epic film library to PolyGram Filmed Entertainment in 1997, then Metro-Goldwyn-Mayer (MGM) acquired 2/3 of PolyGram's pre-April 1996 library in October 1998. Therefore, MGM now owns most of the Nelson Entertainment library with the copyrights being held by Orion Pictures. Due to a previous agreement with Viacom Enterprises, Paramount Pictures (through Trifecta Entertainment & Media) holds the North American television rights to Nelson's post-January 1989 films not co-produced with Castle Rock Entertainment. Castle Rock Entertainment's pre-January 1994 titles are owned by Warner Bros., but are controlled by MGM via Orion, while the film Labyrinth is currently controlled by The Jim Henson Company, with distribution rights currently licensed to Shout! Studios.

== Filmography ==
=== Feature films ===
Release Date	Title	Co-producer	Distributor
October 16, 1987	The Whales of August		Alive Films
November 13, 1987	Hope and Glory	Goldcrest Films	Columbia Pictures
April 15, 1988	The Moderns		Alive Films
April 22, 1988	A Time of Destiny		Columbia Pictures
April 22, 1988	White Mischief	Goldcrest Films; BBC	Columbia Pictures
September 10, 1988	Far North	Alive Films	
January 27, 1989	Cohen and Tate	New Galactic Tate Productions	Hemdale Film Corporation
February 17, 1989	Bill & Ted's Excellent Adventure	Interscope Communications; De Laurentiis Entertainment Group	Orion Pictures
April 14, 1989	Winter People	Castle Rock Entertainment	Columbia Pictures
July 21, 1989	When Harry Met Sally...	Castle Rock Entertainment	Columbia Pictures
November 17, 1989	Prancer	Cineplex Odeon Films	Orion Pictures
March 16, 1990	Lord of the Flies	Castle Rock Entertainment	Columbia Pictures
April 6, 1990	The First Power	Interscope Communications	Orion Pictures
September 28, 1990	Texasville	Cine-Source	Columbia Pictures
October 26, 1990	Sibling Rivalry	Castle Rock Entertainment	Columbia Pictures
November 30, 1990	Misery	Castle Rock Entertainment	Columbia Pictures
December 19, 1990	Hamlet	Icon Productions; Carolco Pictures; Sovereign Pictures	Warner Bros.
January 18, 1991	Eve of Destruction	Interscope Communications	Orion Pictures
June 7, 1991	City Slickers	Castle Rock Entertainment	Columbia Pictures
July 19, 1991	Bill & Ted's Bogus Journey	Interscope Communications	Orion Pictures
October 11, 1991	The Taking of Beverly Hills		Columbia Pictures
April 29, 1994	The Favor		Orion Pictures
September 23, 1994	There Goes My Baby		Orion Pictures
