= Best Seller =

1987 American film by John Flynn

- Theatrical release poster
- Directed by: John Flynn
- Written by: Larry Cohen
- Produced by: Cater DeHaven
- Starring: James Woods; Brian Dennehy; Victoria Tennant
- Cinematography: Fred Murphy
- Edited by: David Rosenbloom
- Music by: Jay Ferguson
- Production company: Hemdale Film Corporation
- Distributed by: Orion Pictures
- Release date: September 25, 1987
- Running time: 95 minutes
- Country: United States
- Language: English
- Box office: $4.2 million

Best Seller is a 1987 American neo-noir crime thriller film written by Larry Cohen, directed by John Flynn and starring James Woods and Brian Dennehy. The film tells the story of Cleve (Woods), a career hitman, who wants to turn his life story into a book written by Dennis Meechum (Dennehy), a veteran police officer and best-selling author

The words and lyrics to the final score, entitled "Perfect Ending", were written by Lamont Dozier.

== Plot ==
In 1972, a group of gunmen wearing Richard Nixon Halloween masks steal evidence from a police evidence storage unit, killing several officers in the process. Dennis Meechum is an officer on duty during the theft. Meecham is badly wounded but survives after managing to stab one of the robbers. He goes on to publish a book titled Inside Job based on his experience.

In 1987, Meechum, who by now has become an acclaimed author and a much decorated detective, is working on his next novel but is suffering from writer's block, and is a widowed father raising his daughter, Holly. While on a stakeout at the docks, he encounters Cleve who seems to know him. As the suspect attempts to escape he gains the upper hand on Meechum but Cleve intervenes shooting the man and saves Meechum's life. Cleve then mysteriously disappears.

Cleve later arranges a meeting with Meechum, and tries to convince him to write a book about his history as a paid assassin working for a corporate empire, Kappa International. Cleve invites the doubting Meechum to a political party in honour of David Madlock. Cleve intimidates the politician proving to Meechum there is something in what he says. Meechum decides to go ahead and write a book while Cleve promises to show evidence to back up his claims.

Cleve takes Meechum to different locations and shows him various assassinations he carried out for Madlock and aid him in his rise to power. Meechum insists that Cleve take him to Texas to meet his completely unaware parents.

Later while out in a restaurant, the two men get in a scuffle and Meechum finds scars on Cleve that prove he was the thief he stabbed during the earlier robbery. He leaves Cleve disgusted and goes to his editor who is excited about the concept of the book. Later while on duty Madlock, through his legal representatives, tries to dissuade Meechum through a bribe and then some threats. Madlock fails.

With no other option Madlock enlists an enforcer to steal a copy of Meechum's manuscript. The assassin encounters Meechum's daughter Holly. Before he can hurt the girl, Cleve intervenes rescuing Holly. Cleve spirits Holly away and then tells Meechum his daughter is safe. Unfortunately Madlock has bribed two police officers who kidnap Holly. Madlock meets Meechum and threatens him, disclosing that he has managed to kidnap Holly.

While Madlock is talking to Meechum, Cleve infiltrates the house taking out Madlock's bodyguards one by one. He eventually manages to rescue Holly, telling her to stay behind. As he confronts Madlock, Madlock shoots Meechum causing Holly to try and run to her wounded father and Madlock holds her at gunpoint. Cleve with no other option drops his weapon only for Madlock to shoot and kill Cleve. Holly escapes and Madlock is arrested. Cleve mortally wounded admonishes Meechum that it would have been the perfect ending before dying in Meechum's arms.

His final words are "Remember I'm the hero". In the end, it is revealed that Meechum has published the book titled Retribution: The Fall of David Madlock and Kappa International and it has had 28 weeks on the bestseller list.

== Cast ==
- James Woods as Cleve
- Brian Dennehy as Dennis Meechum
- Victoria Tennant as Roberta Gillian
- Allison Balson as Holly Meechum
- Paul Shenar as David Madlock
- George Coe as Graham
- Anne Pitoniak as Mrs. Foster
- Mary Carver as Cleve's Mother
- Sully Boyar as Monks
- Kathleen Lloyd as Annie
- Charles Tyner as Cleve's Father
- Jay Ingram as Turner
- Jeffrey Josephson as Pearlman
- Edward Blackoff as Thorn
- J.P. Bumstead as Rothman
- Daniel Trent as Jarvis
- William Bronder as Foley

== Production ==
Larry Cohen wrote the original script. He was inspired by the film Strangers on a Train (1951) and wrote it with Burt Lancaster and Kirk Douglas in mind for the lead roles. The project was in development at a number of studios for years before Orion decided to make it.

John Flynn says he substantially rewrote the script which was originally called Hard Cover.

Cohen was happy with the casting of Dennehy and Woods. He later said, "The picture itself turned out to be pretty good with one glaring exception: the ending. Everything was going along great but then, in the last five minutes, they fucked up the whole movie. That is what I mean when I say it [the film] was only partially successful."

Cohen's problem was that the climax had Dennehy's daughter running towards the killer instead of away from him. He recommended the scene be re-cut without shooting extra footage but says he was ignored.

== Reception ==
Cohen says the film did not perform well financially though he thought "it was a good picture all the way up to the climax. I don’t want to go on about it, but they killed the movie with that conclusion and it’s amazing how you can do that. If they had made that one little cut I suggested, maybe the word of mouth would have been a little better and Best Seller could have made some money."

Roger Ebert gave the film 1 star out of 4 stars, but Jonathan Rosenbaum called it "first-class action storytelling stripped to its essentials," with Dennehy making "a wonderful straight man for Woods's fascinatingly creepy yet sensitive killer."

The film holds a rating of 71% on Rotten Tomatoes from 17 reviews.
