= Caine's Arcade =

- Directed by: Nirvan Mullick
- Produced by: Nirvan Mullick
- Starring: Caine Monroy
- Music by: Juli Crockett, Dead Man's Bones
- Release date: April 9, 2012
- Running time: 11 minutes
- Country: United States
- Language: English

Caine's Arcade is a 2012 documentary short film directed by Nirvan Mullick. The film depicts a cardboard arcade created by 9-year-old Caine Monroy, who operated it from his father's auto parts store in East Los Angeles in 2011. Mullick, who became the arcade's first customer, documented the project in this 11-minute film.

Following the film's release, Mullick co-founded the Imagination Foundation, a nonprofit organization.

== Background ==
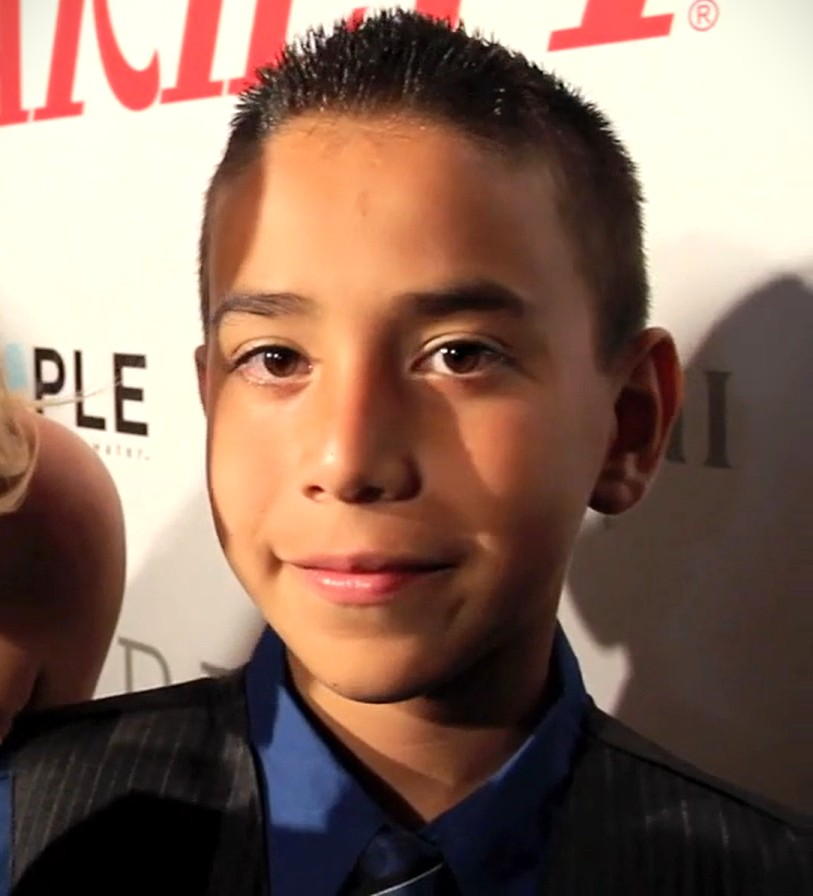
Caine Monroy in 2012

Before 2011, Caine spent weekends at his father George's auto parts store, both to pass the time and to earn some money. Caine tried various business ideas, including selling yard signs for sports teams and snacks from vending machines. However, as the store was located in an industrial area of East Los Angeles with low foot traffic and mainly served as a warehouse for online sales, these efforts were largely unsuccessful.

In the summer of 2011, Caine discovered several discarded cardboard boxes at the store and asked his father's permission to set up an arcade in the front. George agreed, and Caine built the games and created a ticket and prize redemption system. He initially used his old toys, such as Hot Wheels cars, as prizes, before switching to items purchased at dollar stores. Caine operated the games manually, retrieving balls and handing out tickets to players through slots. During a family trip to Palm Springs, he requested a custom T-shirt with "Caine's Arcade" printed on one side and "Staff" on the other, despite not knowing what the word "staff" meant at the time.

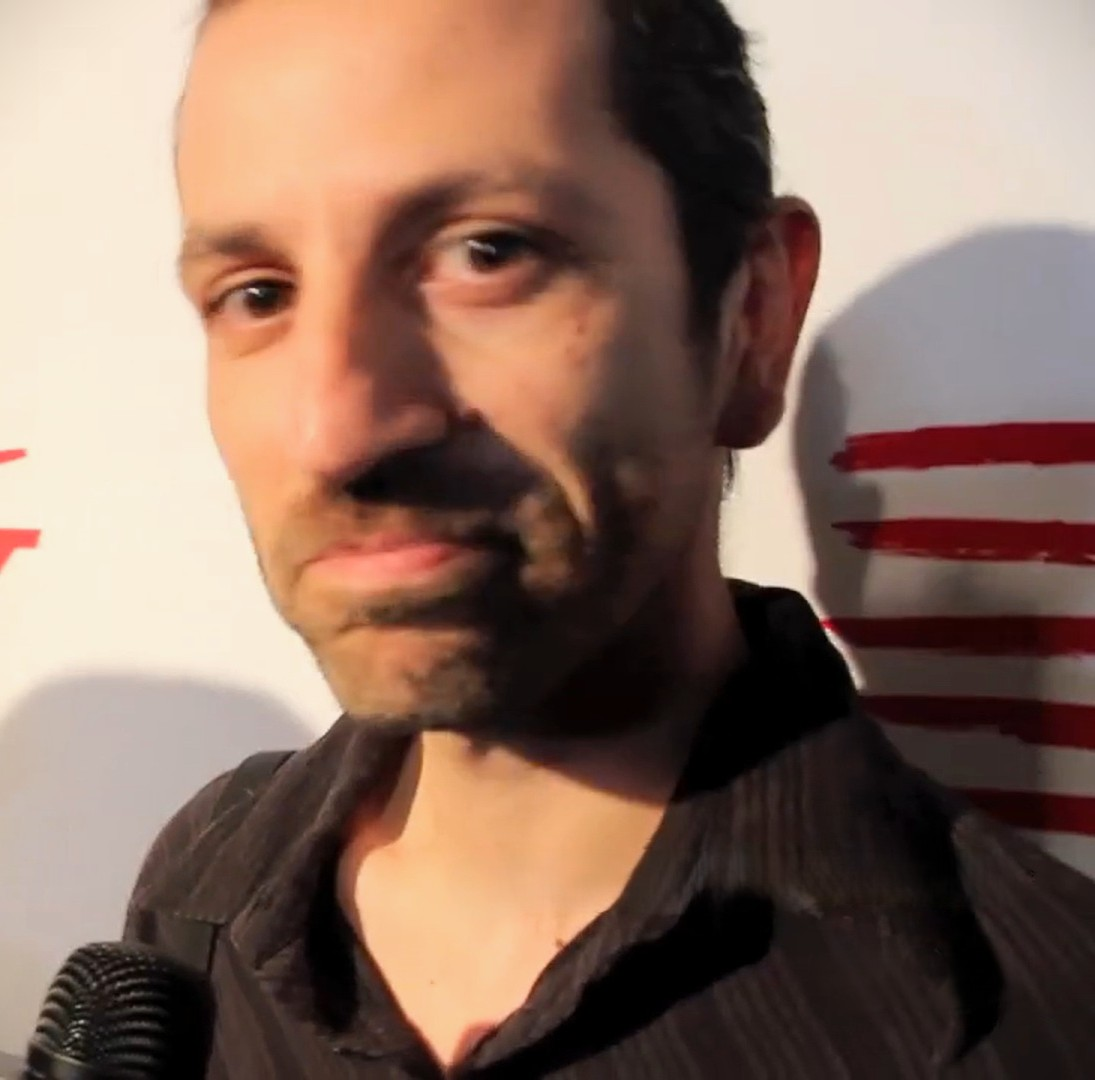
Nirvan Mullick in 2012

Filmmaker Nirvan Mullick first noticed Caine's project when getting a new door handle for his 1996 Toyota Corolla. Intrigued by the arcade, Mullick spoke with Caine and was impressed by the business elements, such as the $2 "Fun Pass" that offered 500 plays. Mullick bought a Fun Pass himself and played the games.

== Documentary ==
After visiting Caine's Arcade, Mullick returned a few weeks later to ask George for permission to make a short film about the arcade. He planned to debut the film at "DIY Days", held at the University of California, Los Angeles, in late October. George approved and mentioned that Mullick had been Caine's first and only customer. Upon learning this, Mullick coordinated a flash mob using social media platforms like Facebook and Reddit, intending to include it in the documentary.

Mullick edited a 14-minute rough cut of the documentary, which was shown at a UCLA event in October 2011. The film featured an original song called "Caine's Arcade" by local musician Juli Crockett, along with a track by the band Dead Man's Bones, fronted by actor Ryan Gosling.

The final, 11-minute version of the documentary was released online on April 9, 2012, on Vimeo and YouTube. The film quickly gained attention, accumulating over a million views on the first day and over 5 million views within five days. Mullick attributed the success to the documentary's "strong emotional impact".

== Impact ==
Following the documentary's release, Caine was invited to speak at the USC Marshall School of Business. Caine was also a speaker at the Cannes Lions International Advertising Festival. The Massachusetts Institute of Technology invited Caine to participate in a summer program, and the University of California, Los Angeles, offered to help design a course curriculum for Caine when he is ready to attend college. Media outlets such as Forbes and Fast Company featured profiles on Caine, discussing the arcade's relevance to youth entrepreneurship. The arcade was temporarily displayed in the Exploratorium in San Francisco.

While the arcade was open, nearby businesses and local musicians worked to create a street-fair-like environment surrounding the arcade.

Caine reportedly continued operating the arcade on weekends for approximately 18 months, eventually closing it at age 11. According to interviews, he expressed interest in starting a bicycle repair and customization project. According to HuffPost, Caine was, at the 2013 Colorado Innovation Network Summit in Denver, Colorado, offered a scholarship to attend Colorado State University.

Mullick established a college fund for Caine, with an initial goal of $25,000. Contributions quickly surpassed this amount, reaching more than $60,000 on the first day and exceeding $170,000 one week later. The total fund has raised over $240,000, with an ultimate goal of $250,000. With a matching grant from the Goldhirsh Foundation, Mullick started the Imagination Foundation, a non-profit seeking to initiate programs fostering creativity and entrepreneurship in children.

Educators and parents shared photos and videos of similar cardboard arcade projects, reportedly inspired by the documentary. One such clip included actor-musician Jack Black and his children. Later, Mullick and his team would work with volunteer teachers to create an open-ended curriculum, which they hoped would enable students to develop similar projects from scratch.

In September 2012, nearing the first anniversary of the surprise flash mob event, Mullick released a sequel: Caine's Arcade 2, composed mainly of footage of children inspired by the original project. As part of the foundation's outreach, Mullick launched the Global Cardboard Challenge, an annual event inviting children to build projects using cardboard and recycled materials. Three weeks after the follow-up film, volunteers organized more than 270 Cardboard Challenge events across 41 countries, including one at Caine's Arcade in Boyle Heights. The event became an annual event, with initial sponsorship from Mattress Firm, which learned of the story after Mullick and Caine spoke at a Mattress Firm event.

The Imagination Foundation has since expanded its programs, adding Imagination Chapters in 2014 and an Inventor's Challenge in 2016.
