= Hemdale Film Corporation =

American-British film production company and distributor

- Industry: Film
- Founded: October 1967; 59 years ago (original; as The Hemdale Company); July 2025; 1 year ago
- Founders: David Hemmings; John Daly
- Defunct: November 1995; 31 years ago (original)
- Fate: Bankruptcy And Liquidation, assets sold to Trans World Entertainment via Consortium de Realisation
- Headquarters: Los Angeles, California, United States; London, England, United Kingdom
- Key people: John Daly; Derek Gibson; Eric Parkinson

Hemdale Film Corporation (known as Hemdale Communications after 1992) is a film distribution company. The company was founded in London in 1967 as the Hemdale Company by actor David Hemmings and John Daly, naming the company from a combination of their surnames. The company produced numerous acclaimed films, often in conjunction with companies such as TriStar and Orion Pictures, including The Terminator (1984), Platoon (1986) and The Last Emperor (1987), the latter two being back-to-back winners of the Academy Award for Best Picture.

== History ==
=== Beginnings ===
John Daly was working as an insurance salesman. He met actor David Hemmings, who had just made Blow Up and Camelot. Hemmings had been invited to Hollywood and given a spare ticket for his girlfriend. When the relationship faded, Hemmings offered the ticket to Daly, who flew out. The two men started a company. The company was announced in October 1967.

Hemdale was originally a talent agency in 1967, managing the rock bands Yes and Black Sabbath. It also held the worldwide stage rights of Oliver!

In July 1968, it was announced Hemdale, which by then also managed Peter McEnery, would buy into the property and restaurant group Perben. Hemdale also managed a finance firm and public relations outfit. By July 1969 Hemdale had interests in the restaurant the Chantalier. In November of that year, the "Hemdale Group" had started to move into film production, with the short film Simon, Simon and the feature Ritual.

In August 1970, the company issued a writ against co-founder David Hemmings asking for repayment of a loan worth £43,000, and a breach of contract for making Unman, Wittering and Zigo. Hemdale had also acquired an interest in the Tigon Group, which led to legal complications. The chairman and Laurie Marsh, a person on the board of directors, both resigned. By this stage, Hemdale had 14 artists under contract including Jack Wild. Share trading in Hemdale was suspended and Hemdale sold Tigon to Laurie Marsh.

By May 1971, Hemdale invested in three films for a total of £1.25 million, including Melody, and had made a takeover attempt of Constellation Investments. The group made a profit of £236,000 for the year.

Later films included The Amazing Mr Blunden, Images and The Triple Echo, along with a later season of Beyond the Fringe. In January 1973, Hemmings reunited with the company to make the film Voices.

Hemdale began as an investment company to cut the high personal taxes on British actors. Eventually, the company went public as Hemdale Ltd. and began diversifying. Hemdale partnered with Patrick Meehan of Worldwide Artists, who once managed the band Black Sabbath, invested in feature films, financed stage productions such as Grease and became involved in boxing promotions, such as The Rumble in the Jungle match between George Foreman and Muhammed Ali. John Daly was Hemdale's chairman and president. David Hemmings left the company in 1971, and Daly purchased his stock. Hemdale also distributed cable TV to hotels, which, in 1974, was its major source of revenue.

=== Relocation to Hollywood ===
After producing and distributing British films throughout the 1970s, Hemdale relocated to Hollywood in 1980 and focused extensively on movie-making. A distribution agreement was made with Orion Pictures. In 1981, Derek Gibson joined the company as executive vice president and head of production. Daly and Gibson were then credited together as executive producers on all Hemdale films.

In 1983, Hemdale shuttered its Hemdale Leisure Corporation division, and Hemdale Film Corporation was created as a division that covered all separate production and distributing division companies, Hemdale Film Productions and Hemdale Film Sales, and they would restructure their own debt, including their own management team, and the UK superstructure was Hemdale Holdings, which arranged the coin support for their American operation.

Among Hemdale's best known films are The Terminator, The Return of the Living Dead, Hoosiers, Salvador, River's Edge, Platoon and The Last Emperor; the latter two were back-to-back recipients of the Academy Award for Best Picture. Hemdale produced and or financed over 80 films during this period. In 1985, Hemdale Film Corporation decided to venture into film distribution, which would be headed by 20th Century Fox executive Peter S. Myers, and decided to continue their relations with Orion Pictures, which included their releases of Hoosiers and At Close Range, and the new distribution range had 12 films planned per year.

In 1986, Salvador was the first major film released by Hemdale Distribution in the United States. Howling II: Your Sister Is a Werewolf had received a regional release in December 1985. On May 14, 1986, the company bought out the distribution rights of the five British motion pictures, which came from the film production studio and international sales representative Film Four International, in order to serve financing for the film The Last Emperor for $21.5 million. On June 25, 1986, the company received a pre-buy on eight Australian movie titles for $10–12 million, and decided to expand the company's worldwide portfolio and represent global distribution and production activity. The company had reached an agreement with Vestron Video on June 25, 1986, in order to bring the entire company's output to the North American home video market, with such releases like Made in U.S.A. and Platoon, after such successes with the agreement, like Hoosiers and At Close Range. On September 10, 1986, Hemdale inked an agreement with HBO/Cannon Video whereas they would increase their profile in order to gave access to ten to fifteen theatricals Hemdale would be producing, and decided to include all pay television rights of nearly all Hemdale features, and the home video rights of the films were assigned as $40 million, and titles Hemdale donated like A Breed Apart, Howling II: Your Sister is a Werewolf and Return of the Living Dead, were already assigned via Hemdale to HBO/Cannon.

On December 10, 1986, Hemdale Film Corporation filed a lawsuit against producer Interlink Film Distribution Corp, which was formed by the Greenberg brothers (Richard M. Greenberg and A. Frederick Goldberg) for failing to meet marketing and other contractual obligations in support of nine Hemdale titles, which claimed by agreement in mid-1983 that the companies had inked an agreement. On March 18, 1987, Hemdale Film Corporation was to be acquired by Computer Memories, a firm that invested $29 million and decided to establish it as a public company, and in exchange for the 80% stock of the common company, and Hemdale would receive 37.6 million shares of newly issued common stock that was donated for the organization and John Daly, the company's founder had to sell 20% in order to raise $30 million that was donated by Computer Memories, and Derek Gibson would become CEO of the newly expanded company, but the deal fell through. On March 18, 1987, Hemdale Film Corporation teamed up with Nelson Entertainment, through its Embassy Home Entertainment subsidiary in order to gain domestic video rights to 10 films, which will be handled by Nelson, while Hemdale retained all other rights, and the budget for the films and in a co-financing agreement, and the 10 Hemdale/Nelson films would gain $6 million, whereas Nelson went into the $25–30 million range, judging by current market conditions of its titles.

In 1987, Vestron Video sued HBO Video over the video rights to Platoon and Hoosiers. Hemdale initially licensed the two films to Vestron until the two parties had disagreements and, citing breach of contract, Hemdale turned around and sold the video rights to HBO. On June 3, 1987, Nelson Entertainment decided to be challenged to the Vestron/HBO lawsuit, and the company filed for Nelson, because Nelson decided to pick up an identical set of 12 films under almost identical terms as the arrangement Vestron was trying to enforce, and the deal decided to add another film to the mix, High Tide, that brought advance for $3 million. The lawsuit ultimately delayed the release of Platoon for three months until a settlement was reached wherein HBO would hold the video rights to the disputed films for six months, at the end of which the rights reverted to Vestron.

In 1991, Hemdale brought in home video executive Eric Parkinson to establish the company's own in-house home video distribution. The new video operation was an immediate success, buoyed in large part to Parkinson's launch of the division with the original Terminator feature, the same week that the James Cameron-directed sequel, Terminator 2: Judgment Day, was released to theatres. Hemdale Home Video quickly became the cash cow for all operations, and in April of the following year, Hemdale Video was merged with a NASDAQ company called Peerless Productions to form a new entity, Hemdale Communications, Inc. (NASDAQ). In an attempt to attach revenues from the successful home video venture operated by Parkinson, former creditors of Hemdale Films alleged that some of the distribution rights licensed by Hemdale Communications, Inc. were done so at unfair market prices. None of these claims prevailed. The video division's success motivated the promotion of Eric Parkinson within the Hemdale family, and ultimately to C.E.O. The Hemdale video division created a collection of video titles released by Hemdale Home Video in the US; its first No. 1 hit title was the home video reissue of the original Terminator in 1991, via a distribution deal it signed with the old Hemdale company, then renamed NSB Film Corporation, to release some films from the latter's 150-title library. In 1992, Hemdale Pictures was also merged into the NASDAQ public company, Hemdale Communications, Inc.

In 1992, NSB sued Daly and Gibson for allegedly unfairly selling some Hemdale properties to the public company managed by Parkinson and Crédit Lyonnais Bank Nederland for breach of contract, racketeering, fraud, equitable subordination and contributing to its bankruptcy. The NSB claims against Daly and Gibson were dismissed. The next year, Crédit Lyonnais filed a lawsuit against NSB, resulting in the bank foreclosing on both NSB and its Hemdale library and forcing NSB to sever ties with Hemdale Home Video and Hemdale Communications to release some of its titles. In 1994, NSB and Crédit Lyonnais settled their year-old ligation.

In March 1995, Daly and Gibson left the company, to be succeeded in their positions by Eric Parkinson as C.E.O., handling all Hemdale related activities and affiliates, including Hemdale Holdings, Hemdale Pictures and Hemdale Film Sales. That November, the company was reorganized as a preplanned step for a general shut-down of operations.

=== Aftermath ===
After the studio closed, the Hemdale library was then incorporated into Consortium de Réalisation, a French holding company set up by Crédit Lyonnais to handle the rights to titles acquired by Credit Lyonnais Bank (this was otherwise known as the Epic library). In 1999, the library was incorporated into the Orion Pictures output now owned by Metro-Goldwyn-Mayer via PolyGram Filmed Entertainment, after MGM acquired the Consortium de Réalisation/"Epic" library from PolyGram (ironically, Orion was the theatrical distributor for a number of Hemdale's films). One significant exception is The Last Emperor, a Hemdale production whose rights are now held by its producer, Jeremy Thomas. Hemdale licensed each of the US media rights to different companies; for example, Columbia Pictures handled US theatrical distribution only. Most of the foreign productions Hemdale distributed have subsequently returned to their original owners (such as Little Nemo: Adventures in Slumberland, which producer Tokyo Movie Shinsha now controls worldwide). In the late '80s and early '90s, the television rights to the Hemdale library lay with Carolco Pictures.

In July 2025, Deadline Hollywood reported that Eric Parkinson has revived the Hemdale name as a distribution label. The first release from the revived Hemdale will be the documentary Torn: The Israeli-Palestine Poster War on NYC Streets.

== Films ==
Release date	Title	Notes
1970	Simon, Simon	
1971	Melody	
1971	Girl Stroke Boy	
1971	The Legend of Frenchie King	French Western film with Brigitte Bardot and Claudia Cardinale
1972	Whoever Slew Auntie Roo?	
1972	Embassy	
1972	Where Does It Hurt?	
November 17. 1972	The Triple Echo	distributed by Hemdale
December 18, 1972	Images	distributed by Columbia Pictures
March 19, 1975	Tommy	distributed by Columbia Pictures
August 19, 1979	Sunburn	distributed by Paramount Pictures
April 24, 1981	Cattle Annie and Little Britches	distributed by Universal Pictures
September 25, 1981	Carbon Copy	co-production with RKO Pictures; distributed by Avco Embassy Pictures
October 16, 1981	Strange Behavior	distributed by World Northal
October 14, 1982	Turkey Shoot	distributed by New World Pictures
June 24, 1983	Yellowbeard	distributed by Orion Pictures
April 1984	Race for the Yankee Zephyr	Distributed by Film Ventures International
June 1984	A Breed Apart	distributed by Orion Pictures
September 28, 1984	Irreconcilable Differences	co-production with Warner Bros. Pictures
October 26, 1984	The Terminator	distributed by Orion Pictures; Inducted into the National Film Registry in 2008
November 16, 1984	Special Effects	distributed by New Line Cinema
November 1984	Perfect Strangers	distributed by New Line Cinema
January 25, 1985	The Falcon and the Snowman	distributed by Orion Pictures
August 16, 1985	The Return of the Living Dead	distributed by Orion Pictures
December 1985	Howling II: Your Sister Is a Werewolf	
March 5, 1986	Salvador	
April 18, 1986	At Close Range	distributed by Orion Pictures
November 14, 1986	Hoosiers	distributed by Orion Pictures; Inducted into the National Film Registry in 2001
November 21, 1986	Body Slam	distributed by De Laurentiis Entertainment Group
November 21, 1986	Defense of the Realm	
December 19, 1986	Platoon	distributed by Orion Pictures; Inducted into the National Film Registry in 2019
May 8, 1987	River's Edge	distributed by Island Pictures
May 15, 1987	Made in U.S.A.	distributed by TriStar Pictures
May 1987	My Little Girl	
June 12, 1987	Burke & Wills	
July 10, 1987	The Whistle Blower	
August 1, 1987	Love at Stake	distributed by TriStar Pictures
August 21, 1987	Inside Out	
September 18, 1987	Hotel Colonial	distributed by Orion Pictures
September 25, 1987	Best Seller	distributed by Orion Pictures
November 20, 1987	The Last Emperor	distributed by Columbia Pictures
November 1987	Slate, Wyn & Me	
December 18, 1987	High Tide	distributed by TriStar Pictures
1987	Scenes from the Goldmine	
February 5, 1988	The Supergrass	
March 25, 1988	High Season	
May 25, 1988	The Tale of Ruby Rose	
July 15, 1988	A Killing Affair	
September 15, 1988	War Party	
November 23, 1988	Buster	
December 23, 1988	The Boost	
January 13, 1989	Ha-Holmim	
January 27, 1989	Cohen and Tate	
March 3, 1989	Out Cold	
April 28, 1989	Criminal Law	
May 19, 1989	Miracle Mile	
June 2, 1989	Vampire's Kiss	
July 21, 1989	Shag	
August 18, 1989	Blood Red	
September 22, 1989	The Time Guardian	
October 6, 1989	The Everlasting Secret Family	
November 10, 1989	Staying Together	
January 5, 1990	Love or Money	
January 26, 1990	Incident at Raven's Gate	
April 20, 1990	Chattahoochee	
May 6, 1990	The Belly of an Architect	
??, 1990	Wishful Thinking	
September 21, 1990	Don't Tell Her It's Me	
November 2, 1990	Vincent & Theo	
November 21, 1990	Hidden Agenda	
April 12, 1991	Impromptu	
April 19, 1991	Kill Line	
June 14, 1991	Bright Angel	
September 27, 1991	Prime Target	distribution
November 15, 1991	Cheap Shots	
November 1991	Thousand Pieces of Gold	distribution
February 28, 1992	Complex World	distribution
March 13, 1992	Highway to Hell	distribution
May 29, 1992	Cold Heaven	distribution
June 15, 1992	Beautiful Dreamers	distribution
??, 1992	Round Numbers	distribution
August 7, 1992	Bed & Breakfast	distribution
August 21, 1992	Little Nemo: Adventures in Slumberland	distribution
August 26, 1992	Knock Outs	distribution
September 1, 1992	The Legend of Wolf Mountain	distribution
October 14, 1992	Murder Blues	distribution
??, 1992	Merlin - The True Story of Magic	distribution
March 1, 1993	Breakfast of Aliens	distribution
March 5, 1993	Love Your Mama	distribution
April 25, 1993	The Magic Voyage	distribution
September 10, 1993	The Seventh Coin	distribution
September 15, 1993	Laser Moon	distribution
October 6, 1993	In a Moment of Passion	distribution
January 5, 1994	Quest of the Delta Knights	distribution
January 19, 1994	Future Shock	distribution
??, 1994	The Polar Bear King	distribution
May 4, 1994	Confessions of a Hitman	distribution
June 3, 1994	The Princess and the Goblin	distribution
September 13, 1994	Savage Land	distribution
October 19, 1994	The Story of Christmas	distribution
January 3, 1995	The Littlest Viking	distribution
March 28, 1995	Across the Moon	distribution
May 20, 1995	Mosquito	distribution
October 24, 1996	One More Shot	co-distribution with Tapeworm Video Distributors
October 31, 1997	Grizzly Mountain	co-distribution with Legacy Releasing and LIVE Entertainment
September 5, 2025	Torn: The Israeli-Palestine Poster War on NYC Streets	
