= Nirvan Mullick =

American animator and filmmaker (born 1975)

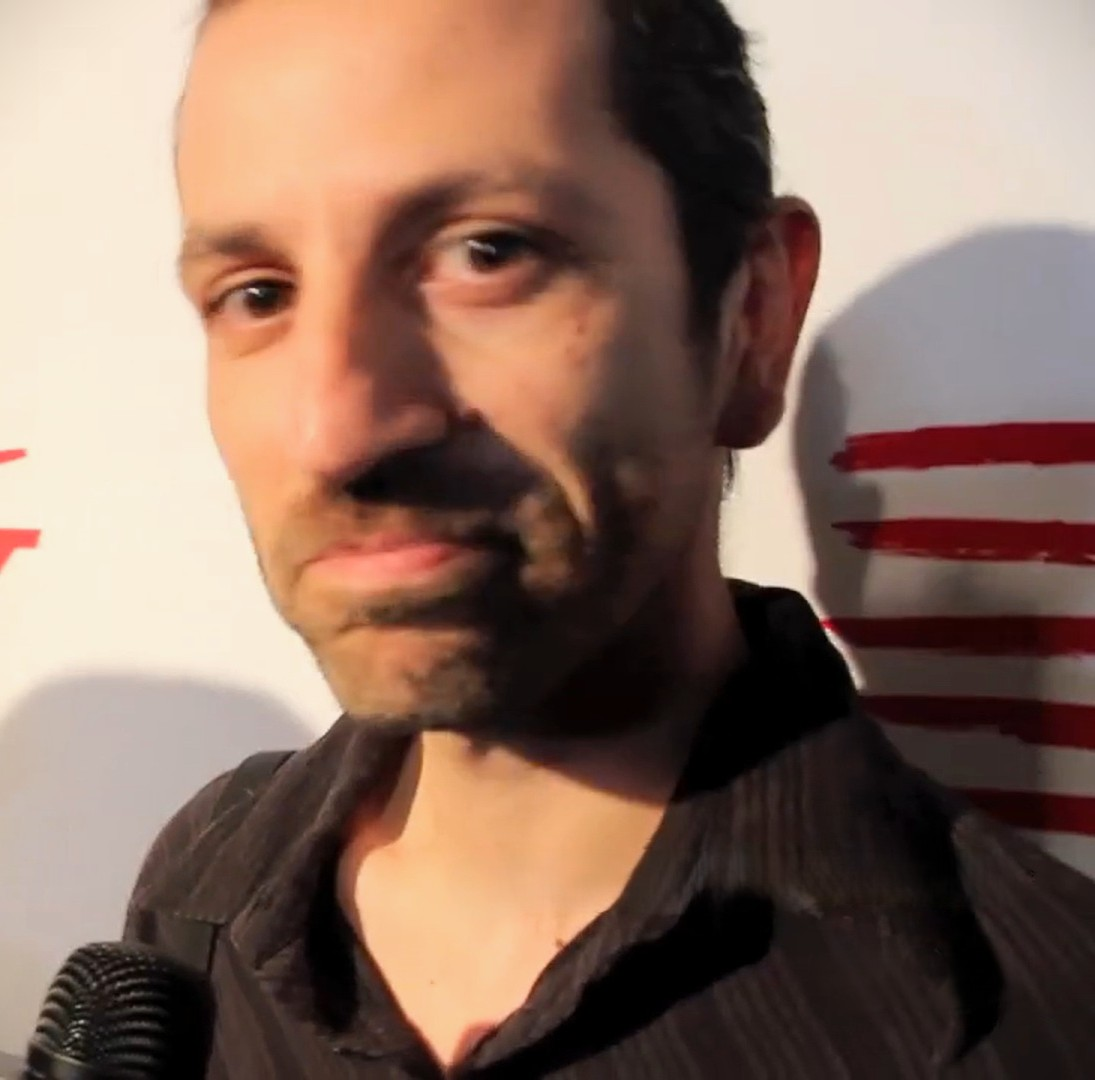
Mullick in 2012

Nirvan Mullick (born April 8, 1975) is a Los Angeles–based filmmaker, writer, speaker, stop motion animator and founder of the Imagination Foundation.

== Career ==
Mullick came into public view after creating The 1 Second Film project, amongst the first crowd-funded films, Mullick began selling $1 Producer credits in 2000 to raise funds for the film's production, with companies and individuals funding the film via donations in exchange for being listed in the film's credits in the order of amount donated. Producer donations from dozens of prominent celebrities helped the film achieve international recognition with over 14,000 producers. The one-second of film consists of animation created by large murals painted collaboratively on March 8, 2001, at California Institute of the Arts, where Mullick studied Experimental Animation. Color design for the animation was created by Jules Engel. From 2015 to 2016, Mullick directed the UN Foundation's #EarthToParis Climate Campaign for COP21 and COP22.

Mullick also directed the opening title-sequence animation to the 2003 film Willard and the stop-motion animated film The Box Man which screened in multiple film festivals, including Cannes Cinefondation, winning the AFI Fest Audience Award, and was nominated for a Student Academy Award. Mullick received an MFA in Experimental Animation from California Institute of the Arts.

He also created a viral short documentary called Caine's Arcade about a nine-year-old boy named Caine Monroy who created a cardboard arcade in his father's used auto parts shop. The short was released on April 9, 2012, and received considerable attention, and launched a movement to foster the creativity of more kids. Mullick's goal of raising a $25,000 college fund for Caine reached $180,000 in on-line PayPal donations by April 20, 2012 (only ten days after the initial release of the video) – eventually raising over $240,000, with over ten million views on YouTube and Vimeo. Five days after the film was posted on-line, the Goldhirsh Foundation awarded Mullick a $250,000 grant to create a non-profit inspired by Caine's Arcade, with a mission to "find, foster, and fund creativity and entrepreneurship in kids worldwide". Mullick made a follow-up film to Caine's Arcade titled Caine's Arcade 2 to launch the first Global Cardboard Challenge in 2012. The Cardboard Challenge has since become a popular activity for kids in schools around the world.
