= Mary Lambert (director) =

American director (born 1951)

- Born: Mary Josephine Lambert; October 13, 1951 (age 75); Helena, Arkansas, U.S.
- Occupation: Film director
- Spouse: Jerome Gary (m. 1991)
- Children: 1
- Relatives: Blanche Lincoln (sister)

Mary Martha Lambert (born October 13, 1951) is an American director. She has directed music videos, television episodes, feature films, a video game, and an audiobook mainly in the horror genre.

== Personal life ==
Lambert was born in Helena, Arkansas, the daughter of Martha Kelly and Jordan Bennett Lambert III, a rice and cotton farmer. Her younger sister is former U.S. Senator Blanche Lincoln of Arkansas. Lambert graduated from the Rhode Island School of Design with a B.F.A.

She is married to Jerome Gary and has a son named Jordan.

== Music videos ==
=== Chris Isaak music video and MTV Award nominations ===
Lambert directed Chris Isaak‘s first music video, “Dancin’,” which earned two nominations at the 1985 MTV Music Video Awards for Most Experimental Video and Best Direction. That same year, she received a third nomination for directing Lone Justice‘s “Ways to Be Wicked,” also in the Most Experimental Video category. Lambert was the only woman nominated at the ceremony and accounted for half of the nominations in that category.

=== Music videos for Madonna ===
Mary Lambert directed several of Madonna's most iconic music videos during the 1980s, contributing significantly to the singer's visual identity and artistic evolution.

Lambert's collaboration with Madonna began by directing the video for "Borderline" (1984), which depicted Madonna torn between love and ambition in Los Angeles. "Borderline" was filmed on location in Los Angeles, California, from January 30 to February 2, 1984. The video, which juxtaposed colorful scenes in the barrio with black-and-white shots in a photography studio, tells the story of a young woman torn between her Hispanic boyfriend and a British photographer.

Lambert described the process as highly improvisational, stating there was "no formula" and that they were "inventing it as we went along”. In describing the video's narrative, Lambert told Rolling Stone: "[A] boy and [a] girl enjoy simple pleasures of barrio love; girl is tempted by fame, boy gets huffy, girl gets famous, but her new beau's out-of-line reaction to a behavioral trifle (all she did was spray-paint his expensive sports car) drives her back to her true love".

"Borderline" premiered on MTV in March 1984 and became one of the videos that helped establish Madonna's early image. Years later, it was included in Madonna's video compilations The Immaculate Collection (1990) and Celebration: The Video Collection (2009).

Lambert went on to direct "Like a Virgin" (1984), filmed in Venice, Italy, and New York. The video, featuring Madonna in a gondola and wearing a wedding dress, incorporated symbolic imagery such as a lion, reflecting Lambert's vision of combining fantasy and reality. The video received 3 MTV Video Music Award Nominations for Best Cinematography, Best Choreography, and Best Art Direction.

In 1985, Lambert directed the "Material Girl" video, paying homage to Marilyn Monroe's performance of "Diamonds Are a Girl's Best Friend" from "Gentlemen Prefer Blondes (1953 film)". The video blended commentary on fame and materialism, becoming one of Madonna's most recognizable works. The Video received two MTV Video Music Award Nominations; Best Female Video and Best Cinematography for Kenny Ortega.

Lambert's direction of "La Isla Bonita" (1987) featured Madonna portraying both a devout Catholic woman and a vibrant Flamenco dancer, exploring Latin influences and religious symbolism.

In 1989, Lambert directed "Like a Prayer," which became one of Madonna's most controversial videos due to its use of religious imagery, including burning crosses and references to stigmata. Lambert aimed to explore themes of sexual and religious ecstasy, sparking widespread debate and cementing Madonna's reputation as a provocative artist. The Video Won the MTV Video Music Award for Viewers Choice, and was Nominated for Video of the Year.

Through these videos, Lambert played a key role in shaping the visual narratives during a time that Madonna was being propelled to global stardom.

=== Music videos for Janet Jackson ===
Mary Lambert directed Janet Jackson‘s iconic music videos for “Nasty” and “Control.” The “Control” video, known for its storyline of Jackson asserting independence from her parents, was filmed at the Grand Olympic Auditorium in Los Angeles – but behind the scenes, the production was fraught with challenges.

Both Lambert and producer Sharon Oreck recall it as a difficult and trying experience; Oreck said in 2011 that it was her "worst nightmare" of the many videos she had produced. The crowd, which had been told that they would see Janet Jackson perform, had expected a free concert. The audience, expecting a free Janet Jackson concert, instead endured 50 takes of Jackson lip-syncing “Control.”

At the time, Jackson was in the process of firing her father, Joe Jackson, as her manager. His presence loomed over the set, with Lambert and Oreck recalling how he angrily demanded $1 million in liability insurance before allowing Janet to sit on a trapeze used in the video. When Lambert and Oreck threatened to walk off the project unless the issue was addressed, the record label reluctantly stepped in, telling them, “We don't say no to Joe Jackson.”

Tensions escalated further when the label requested more white audience members to be visible on camera. Lambert quietly rearranged the crowd, but when they realized what was happening, the crowd grew angry. Lambert told the record company representative that she absolutely could not go on due to the potential for violence, and he went out and explained things to the crowd, which calmed down enough to complete the video.

Despite the difficulties, Lambert successfully directed the video to completion. In 1988, the song won a Soul Train Music Award for Best R&B/Soul or Rap Music Video, beating out her brother Michael, Whitney Houston, and Jody Watley.

"Nasty" won the MTV Video Music Award for Best Choreography by Paula Abdul, and was Nominated for Best Female Video & Best Overall Performance in a Video.

=== Additional collaborations ===
Eurythmics: Mary Lambert directed the music video for "Would I Lie to You," showcasing Annie Lennox confronting a cheating lover as she leaves him for good. The Video received 5 MTV Video Award Nominations: Best Group Video, Best Overall Performance, Best Editing, Best Choreography, and Best Stage Performance.

Mick Jagger: Lambert directed the videos for "Say You Will, and "Throwaway".

The Go-Go's: She directed the videos for "Turn to You," which presents a 1960s prom scenario, aligning with the band's upbeat pop-rock sound, as well as the video for "Yes or Now" and the HBO Concert Special "Wild at the Greek"

Live: Lambert directed the videos for "Turn My Head", "Overcome", and "Forever May Not Be Long Enough" featuring the band's intense performance, mirroring the song's passionate lyrics.

Mötley Crüe: She directed the videos for "Don't Go Away Mad, Just Go Away" and "Without You".

Queensrÿche: Lambert directed the video for "Another Rainy Night, Without You"

Sting: She directed the video for "We'll Be Together, in which Lambert paid homage to Jean Cocteau's Orpheus. The Video Won the MTV Video Music Award for Best Cinematography, and was Nominated for Best Choreography

Debbie Harry: Lambert directed the video for "I Want That Man," showcasing Harry in a stylized, futuristic setting, reflecting the song's pop sensibilities.

Tom Tom Club: She directed the video for "As Above So Below," featuring vibrant, animated sequences that match the song's eclectic style.

== Films ==
Lambert was intended to make her directorial debut with Under the Cherry Moon, starring Prince and Kristen Scott Thomas. She was demoted to an advisory role after just four days of filming, and shortly thereafter left the production. Prince replaced her as director. In the final film, she is credited as a creative consultant. After leaving the production, Lambert released a statement saying she had left under "totally amicable circumstances", and that "Prince has such a strong vision of what this movie should be... that it makes no sense for me to stand between him and the film anymore."

In 1987, she released her first feature film, the stylized and controversial experimental work Siesta, starring Ellen Barkin and Jodie Foster. It was nominated for the IFP Spirit Award for Best First Feature, losing to Dirty Dancing.

She is known to horror fans for directing the 1989 adaptation of Stephen King's novel Pet Sematary and its sequel, Pet Sematary Two.

More recently, Lambert directed 2005's Urban Legends: Bloody Mary and the 2011 Syfy horror film Mega Python vs. Gatoroid. She also directed the 1993 Digital Pictures FMV video game Double Switch.

=== Pet Sematary (1989) ===
In 1989, Mary Lambert directed Pet Sematary, a supernatural horror film based on Stephen King's 1983 novel of the same name, with King himself penning the screenplay. Starring Dale Midkiff, Denise Crosby, Blaze Berdahl, Fred Gwynne, and Miko Hughes as Gage Creed, the film's title uses a sensational spelling of "pet cemetery".

The film premiered on April 21, 1989, and achieved significant box office success, grossing $57.5 million on an $11.5 million budget. The popularity of the film led to a sequel, Pet Sematary Two, which was released in 1992 with Lambert returning as director.

Development for the film began in 1984 when the rights were initially sold to George A. Romero for $10,000. However, Romero was unable to proceed with the project due to scheduling conflicts with Monkey Shines. The project languished until the 1988 Writers Guild of America strike, when Paramount Pictures faced a potential shortage of films for 1989. King's screenplay for Pet Sematary was complete, prompting Paramount to greenlight the project.

When it came to selecting a director, King retained creative control and personally chose Mary Lambert. She won him over with her passion for his work and her dedication to staying true to the novel's tone and themes.

Filming took place on location in Maine, honoring King's stipulation that the film be shot in the same state where the novel is set. Locations included Ellsworth, Bangor, and Mount Hope Cemetery, with King actively involved throughout production. He regularly consulted with Lambert, offering input and collaborating on key decisions to ensure the adaptation preserved the essence of his novel.

During the casting process, Lambert faced resistance from studio executives. She insisted on casting two-year-old Miko Hughes as Gage Creed, despite the studio's preference for using twins, which was the standard cost-effective practice for child roles. Lambert felt Hughes had a natural talent that could not be duplicated. She also fought to cast Fred Gwynne as Jud Crandall, despite concerns that his previous role as Herman Munster would prevent audiences from taking him seriously.

Another creative decision by Lambert involved the character of Zelda, Rachel Creed's sister. Initially, young actresses auditioned for the role, but Lambert ultimately cast Andrew Hubatsek in order to heighten the unsettling nature of the character.

The film's conclusion was changed at Paramount's request. Lambert originally filmed a more ambiguous ending, in which Rachel Creed returns as an undead figure, leaving her husband's fate uncertain. However, the studio wanted a more graphic climax, resulting in reshoots to depict Rachel attacking Louis Creed.

The film's soundtrack included music by the Ramones, one of King's favorite bands. Lambert, having a personal friendship with the band through her work directing music videos, requested they write and perform the track "Pet Sematary," which plays over the closing credits.

== Filmography ==
Short film

Year	Title	Director	Writer	Producer
1977	Rapid Eye Movements	Yes	No	No
2012	Pearl	Yes	Yes	Yes

=== Film ===
Year	Title	Notes
1986	Under the Cherry Moon	Uncredited, listed as Creative Consultant
1987	Siesta	
1989	Pet Sematary	
1991	Grand Isle	
1992	Pet Sematary Two	
1999	Clubland	
2000	The In Crowd	
2001	Halloweentown II: Kalabar's Revenge	
2001	Strange Frequency	
2005	Urban Legends: Bloody Mary	
2007	The Attic	
2014	Presumed Dead in Paradise	
2014	Fishing Pono: Living in Harmony with the Sea	Also writer
2021	A Castle for Christmas	
2023	Best. Christmas. Ever!	

=== Television ===
Year	Title	Director	Writer	Episode	Notes
1992	Red Shoe Diaries	Yes	Yes	"Accidents Happen"	Credited as Alan Smithee
1994	Rebel Highway	Yes	Yes	"Dragstrip Girl"	
2001	Strange Frequency	Yes	Yes	"More Than a Feeling"	
2001	Strange Frequency	Yes	Yes	"Disco Inferno"	
2007	On the Road in America	Yes	Yes	"Mississippi Delta"	
2008	The Dark Path Chronicles	Yes	Yes	"Lost in the Dark Path"	
2008	The Dark Path Chronicles	Yes	Yes	"Searching for Solace"	
2008	The Dark Path Chronicles	Yes	Yes	"Entering the Dark Path"	
2008	The Dark Path Chronicles	Yes	Yes	"Trapped"	
2008	The Dark Path Chronicles	Yes	Yes	"Vampire Temptations"	
2008	The Dark Path Chronicles	Yes	Yes	"A Father's Warning"	
2008	The Dark Path Chronicles	Yes	Yes	"Friday Evening: The Awakening"	
2010	On the Road in America	Yes	No	"Cowboys and Indians"	
2016	The Blacklist	Yes	No	"The Director"	
2017	Arrow	Yes	No	"The Sin-Eater"	
2019	Step Up: High Water	Yes	No	"Splits"	
2021	The Goldbergs	Yes	No	"Daddy Daughter Day 2"	

TV movie

- Dragstrip Girl (1994)
- Face of Evil (1996)
- Love Is Strange (1996)
- My Stepson, My Lover (1997) (a.k.a. Love, Murder and Deceit)
- Mega Python vs. Gatoroid (2011)

TV special

- VH1 Divas 2012 (2012)

=== Documentary works ===
- Bobby Brown: His Prerogative (1989) (Video)

Short films

Year	Title	Director	Writer	Herself
2006	Stephen King's 'Pet Sematary': The Characters	No	No	Yes
2006	Stephen King's 'Pet Sematary': Stephen King Territory	No	No	Yes
2006	Stephen King's 'Pet Sematary': Filming the Horror	No	No	Yes
2011	Miss South Pacific: Beauty and the Sea	Yes	Yes	No

Film

Year	Title	Director	Producer	Herself
2007	14 Women	Yes	Yes	No
2014	Sex & Music	No	No	Yes
2017	Unearthed & Untold: The Path to Pet Sematary	No	No	Yes

TV series appearances

Year	Title	Episode
2017	Soundtracks: Songs That Defined History	"Out, Loud & Proud"
2016	Soundbreaking: Stories from the Cutting Edge of Recorded Music	"Sound and Vision"
2012	Celebrity Ghost Stories	"Bill Bellamy/Dawn Wells/Jack Blades/Mary Lambert"
2012	Inside Horror	"Dead Kids Walking"
2004	The 100 Scariest Movie Moments	Part I: 100-81

TV movies

Year	Title	Director	Herself
1984	The Go-Go's: Wild at the Greek	Yes	No
1998	When You Believe: Music from "The Prince of Egypt"	Yes	No
2004	X-Rated: The Pop Videos They Tried to Ban	Yes	Yes
2005	The 100 Greatest Pop Videos	No	Yes
2008	Dark Path Chronicles: Making Of	No	Yes
2008	Dark Path Chronicles: Behind the Characters	Yes	Yes
2009	Pretty Bloody: The Women of Horror	No	Yes
2011	Chiller 13: Horror's Creepiest Kids	No	Yes

=== Music videos ===
Year	Title	Artist	Director	Writer	Producer	Ref.
1998	"When You Believe" (alternate version)	Whitney Houston, Mariah Carey	Yes	Yes	No	
1997	"Turn My Head"	Live	Yes	Yes	No	
1992	"My Destiny"	Lionel Richie	Yes	Yes	No	
1992	"Empire"	Queensrÿche	No	No	No	
1992	"Another Rainy Night (Without You)" (version 2)	Queensrÿche	Yes	Yes	No	
1990	"Don't Go Away Mad (Just Go Away)"	Mötley Crüe	Yes	Yes	No	
1990	"Without You"	Mötley Crüe	Yes	Yes	No	
1989	"Rock Wit'cha"	Bobby Brown	Yes	Yes	No	
1989	"Jelly Roll"	Blue Murder	Yes	Yes	No	
1989	"Valley of the Kings"	Blue Murder	Yes	Yes	No	
1989	"Like a Prayer"	Madonna	Yes	Yes	No	
1987	"La Isla Bonita"	Madonna	Yes	Yes	No	
1987	"We'll Be Together"	Sting	Yes	Yes	No	
1986	"Nasty"	Janet Jackson	Yes	Yes	No	
1986	"Control"	Janet Jackson	Yes	Yes	No	
1986	"Feel the Heat"	Jean Beauvoir	Yes	Yes	No	
1986	"Love Touch"	Rod Stewart	Yes	No	No	
1985	"Dancin'"	Chris Isaak	Yes	Yes	No	
1985	"Would I Lie to You?"	Eurythmics	Yes	Yes	No	
1985	"Ways to Be Wicked"	Lone Justice	Yes	Yes	No	
1985	"Material Girl"	Madonna	Yes	Yes	No	
1984	"The Glamorous Life"	Sheila E.	Yes	Yes	No	
1984	"Like a Virgin"	Madonna	Yes	Yes	No	
1984	"Borderline"	Madonna	Yes	Yes	Yes	
1984	"Turn to You"	The Go-Go's	Yes	Yes	No	
1984	"Monster"	Fred Schneider	Yes	Yes	No	

=== Video game ===
Director

- Double Switch (1993)

=== Audiobook ===
Director

- Dracula (2026)

== Sources ==
- Fouz-Hernández, Santiago; Jarman-Ivens, Freeya (2004). Madonna's Drowned Worlds. Ashgate Publishing, Ltd. ISBN 0-7546-3372-1.
- Tannenbaum, Rob; Marks, Craig (2011). I Want My MTV: The Uncensored Story of the Music Video Revolution. Penguin Books. ISBN 9781101526415.
