= Pet Sematary =

1983 novel by Stephen King

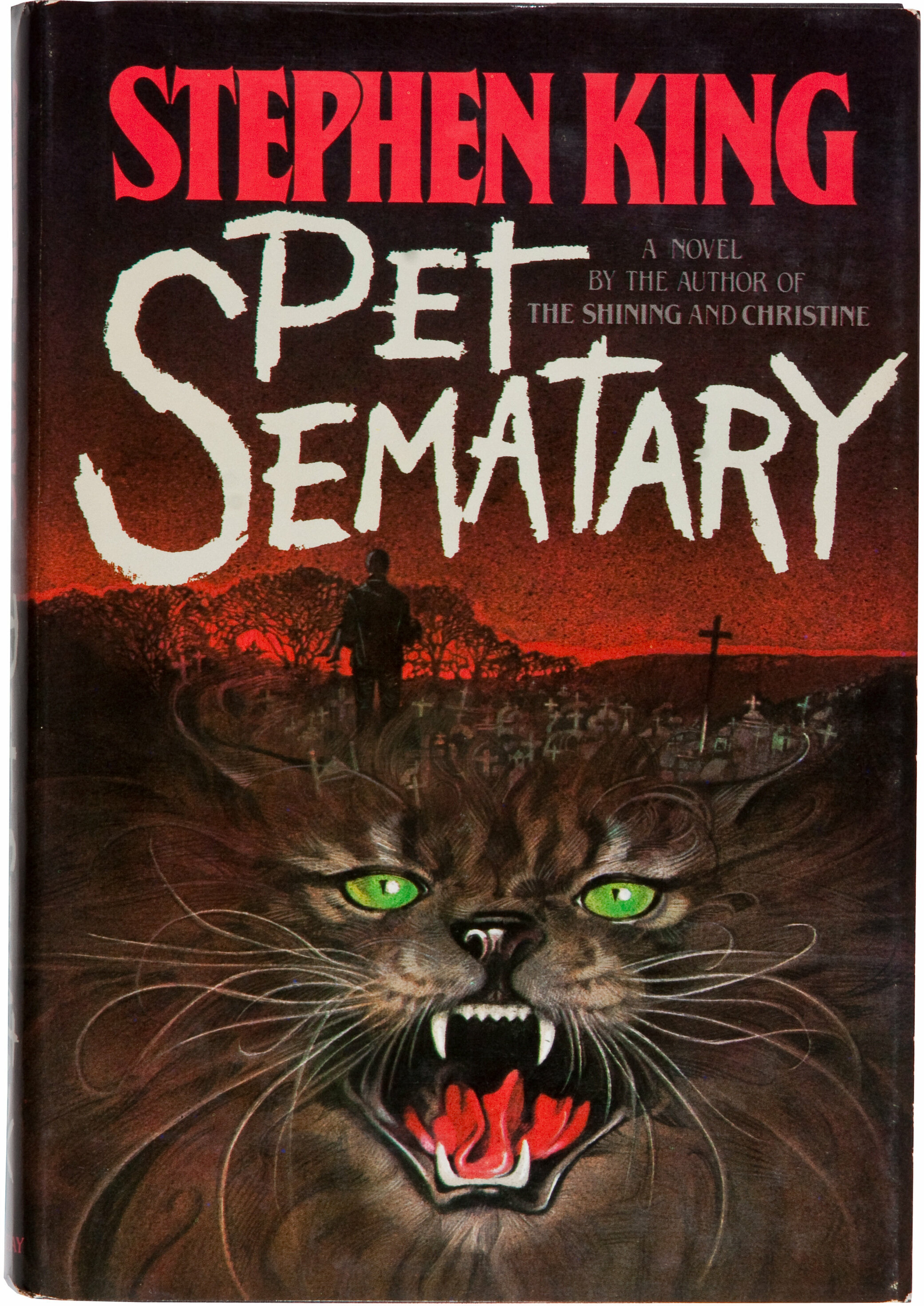
- First edition cover
- Author: Stephen King
- Cover artist: Linda Fennimore
- Language: English
- Genre: Horror
- Publisher: Doubleday
- Publication date: November 14, 1983
- Publication place: United States
- Media type: Print (Hardcover)
- Pages: 374
- ISBN: 978-0-385-18244-7

Pet Sematary is a 1983 horror novel by American writer Stephen King. It tells the story of a family moving to Maine and settling closer to a pet cemetery in the woods, which is home to a terrifying force that brings death and sorrow. The novel was nominated for a World Fantasy Award for Best Novel in 1984, and adapted into two films: one in 1989 and another in 2019 as well as several spinoffs.

== Background ==
In 1979, King was writer-in-residence at the University of Maine and the house his family was renting in Orrington, Maine, was adjacent to a major road where dogs and cats were often killed by oncoming trucks. After his daughter's cat was killed by a truck along that road, he explained the death of the pet to his daughter and buried the cat. Three days later, King imagined what would happen if a family suffered the same tragedy but the cat came back to life. He then imagined what would happen if that family's young son were also killed by a passing truck. He decided to write a book based on these ideas, and that the book would be a re-telling of "The Monkey's Paw" (1902), a short story by W. W. Jacobs about parents whose son resurrects after they wish for that to happen. The first draft was completed in May 1979. In June 1983, King published a short story, "The Return of Timmy Baterman", in the program for the event "Satyricon II" (also known as "DeepSouthCon 21"); this was incorporated into Pet Sematary. King has gone on record stating that of all the novels he has written, Pet Sematary is the one which genuinely scared him the most.

== Plot ==
Louis Creed, a doctor from Chicago, is appointed director of the University of Maine's campus health service. He moves to a house near the town of Ludlow with his wife Rachel, their two young children, Ellie and Gage, and Ellie's cat, Winston Churchill ("Church"). Their elderly neighbor, Jud Crandall, warns Louis and Rachel about the highway that runs past their house, which is frequented by speeding trucks.

Jud and Louis become close friends, with Louis viewing Jud as a kind of surrogate father. Jud takes the family on a walk in the woods behind their home. A well-tended path leads to a pet cemetery (misspelled "sematary" on the sign) maintained by the children of the town. Louis is charmed, but Rachel finds the concept of the pet cemetery disturbing. She finds it difficult to talk about death, following the traumatic death of her sister Zelda when they were both children.

On campus, Louis is called to attend to Victor Pascow, a student who has been mortally injured in an automobile crash. Victor addresses his dying words to Louis, and seems to be warning him of something. The following night, Louis dreams that Victor leads him to the deadfall at the back of the pet cemetery, and warns him not to go beyond that point. Louis wakes to find his feet and bedsheets covered with dried mud and pine needles.

Around Thanksgiving, Ellie's cat, Church, is run over on the highway. Rachel and the children are visiting Rachel's parents in Chicago at the time, and Louis frets over breaking the bad news to Ellie. Jud takes him to the "sematary", supposedly to bury Church, but instead of stopping there, Jud leads Louis beyond the deadfall, to "the real cemetery": an ancient burial ground once used by the Mi'kmaq. Here, Louis buries the cat according to Jud's instructions. The next afternoon, Church returns home, but his whole manner has changed. The once docile cat is now an enthusiastic hunter, leaving the dismembered corpses of his kills for Louis to find. He also smells so bad that Ellie no longer wants him in her room at night. Jud confirms that Church has been resurrected, and admits that as a boy he went through a similar experience with a beloved dog. Louis, deeply disturbed, begins to wish that he had never listened to Jud.

Several months later, two-year-old Gage is killed by a speeding truck on the same highway that caused Church's death. Overcome with despair, Louis considers bringing his son back to life in the same way he resurrected Church. Jud attempts to dissuade him by telling him the story of Timmy Baterman, the last person resurrected in this way. After being killed in action during World War II, Timmy's body was shipped back to the United States, and his grieving father Bill buried Timmy in the secret burial ground. Timmy returned as an altered, malevolent version of himself, terrorizing the people of the town and revealing secrets that he had no way of knowing. Eventually Bill killed Timmy and set their house on fire before shooting himself. Jud believes that whatever came back was not Timmy, but a "demon" in possession of his corpse. He concludes that "sometimes, dead is better" and states that "the place has... its own evil purpose", and that Louis's knowledge of it may even have brought about Gage's death.

Despite Jud's warning and his own reservations, Louis's grief and guilt spur him to act. He arranges for Rachel and Ellie to visit Rachel's parents, while he exhumes Gage's body and re-inters him in the burial ground. While on the way to the site, he encounters a Wendigo, the creature fueling the burial ground. During this time Ellie has prophetic dreams, which spur Rachel to come home early.

The resurrected Gage, who is no longer the child Louis knows, finds one of Louis's scalpels and kills first Jud, then Rachel as she comes home. Aware that he has been manipulated, Louis kills both Church and Gage with lethal injections of morphine.

Louis, driven insane by grief, burns the Crandall house down before returning to the burial ground with his wife's corpse, hoping that if he buries the body immediately, the result may be more favourable. One of his colleagues, Steve Masterton, sees him disappearing into the woods with Rachel's body. In the final scene, Louis sits indoors alone, playing solitaire, when Rachel's reanimated corpse walks up behind him and drops a cold hand on his shoulder.

== Reception ==
The novel received mixed reviews: Kirkus describes it as over-long, and "moving so slowly that every plot-turn becomes lumberingly predictable." By contrast,The Guardian praises the: "subtlety of (the) behind-the-scenes malevolence, constructed slowly and forcefully, and so beautifully paced that you cannot help but be pulled in." The New York Times comments wryly on "the downright silly title", while saying: "if Mr. King's aim in writing ''Pet Sematary'' was not entirely serious... then why, somebody please tell me, was I holding on to his book so hard that my knuckles had begun to turn white?"

== Adaptations ==
=== Films ===
The first film adaptation was released in 1989. Directed by Mary Lambert, it starred Dale Midkiff as Louis, Fred Gwynne as Jud, Denise Crosby as Rachel, Brad Greenquist as Victor, Miko Hughes as Gage, and twins Blaze Berdahl and Beau Berdahl as Ellie. King wrote the screenplay and had a cameo as a minister. Male actor Andrew Hubatsek portrayed Zelda because the filmmakers felt that a grown man playing a disabled, deformed teenage girl would make the character more hideous and frightening. The film received mixed reviews, but it was a commercial success. A sequel, Pet Sematary Two, was released in 1992.

A second film adaptation of the novel was released on April 5, 2019. Directed by Dennis Widmyer and Kevin Kölsch, the film stars Jason Clarke as Louis Creed, Amy Seimetz as Rachel Creed, John Lithgow as Jud Crandall, Jeté Laurence as Ellie Creed, and twins Hugo Lavoie and Lucas Lavoie as Gage Creed. A prequel to the 2019 film was green-lit in February 2021 after producer Lorenzo di Bonaventura laid out plans for a prequel prior to the release of the 2019 film. Pet Sematary: Bloodlines was released on October 6, 2023, as a Paramount+ exclusive release. Taking place fifty years prior, the film follows a young Jud Crandall played by Jackson White.

On December 7, 2021, director Guillermo del Toro said that he would love to make his own version of Pet Sematary, saying, "You know the novel that I would have killed to adapt, and I know there's two versions of it, and I still think maybe in a deranged universe I get to do it again one day is Pet Sematary. Because it not only has the very best final couple of lines, but it scared me when I was a young man. As a father, I now understand it better than I ever would have, and it scares me a hundred times more." Del Toro also pointed out scenes from King's book that were left out of both film versions. "For me, the best scene in that book is when [Louis] opens Gage's coffin, and for a second he thinks the head is gone, because this black fungi from the grave has grown like a fuzz over the kid's face. [...] I think you cannot spare those details and think that you're honoring that book. One of the things I thought about Pet Sematary that we would do in post is when the dead return, when Gage returns, I'd spend an inordinate amount of money taking out the sheen from his eyes. So that the eyes are dull."

=== Radio ===
In 1997, BBC Radio 4 broadcast a dramatization of the story in six half-hour episodes, later re-edited into three hour-long episodes. It was adapted by Gregory Evans and starred John Sharian as Louis Creed, Briony Glassco as Rachel Creed and Lee Montague as Jud Crandall. The production was directed by Gordon House.

=== Music ===
The Ramones recorded a song of the same name as the theme for the 1989 film adaptation. It appeared on their album Brain Drain. It was later covered by the band Starcrawler for the 2019 film.

Ice Nine Kills recorded a song called "Funeral Derangements" based on the book and the movie. A music video was released, being an adaptation of the story.
