= Pet Sematary (1989 film) =

1989 film by Mary Lambert

- Theatrical release poster
- Directed by: Mary Lambert
- Screenplay by: Stephen King
- Based on: Pet Sematary by: Stephen King
- Produced by: Richard P. Rubinstein
- Starring: Dale Midkiff; Fred Gwynne; Denise Crosby; Brad Greenquist; Michael Lombard; Miko Hughes; Blaze Berdahl
- Cinematography: Peter Stein
- Edited by: Daniel P. Hanley; Mike Hill
- Music by: Elliot Goldenthal
- Production company: Paramount Pictures
- Distributed by: Paramount Pictures
- Release date: April 21, 1989
- Running time: 103 minutes
- Country: United States
- Language: English
- Budget: $11.5 million
- Box office: $57.5 million

Pet Sematary is a 1989 American supernatural horror film and the first adaptation of Stephen King's 1983 novel of the same name. Directed by Mary Lambert, with King writing the screenplay, it stars Dale Midkiff, Denise Crosby, Blaze Berdahl, Fred Gwynne and Miko Hughes as Gage Creed. The film follows a doctor named Louis Creed who moves his family to a rural Maine home near a dangerous highway. After their cat dies, a neighbor guides Louis to bury it in an ancient burial ground that brings it back to life evil, leading to disaster when his young son dies and is buried there too.

Pet Sematary was theatrically released in the United States on April 21, 1989, by Paramount Pictures. The film received mixed reviews. It grossed $57.5 million at the box office on a budget of $11.5 million. A sequel, Pet Sematary Two, was released in 1992 and a second film adaptation was released in 2019.

== Plot ==
The Creed family—Louis, Rachel, their children Ellie and Gage and their pet cat Church—move from Chicago to rural Ludlow, Maine, after Louis accepts a job as a local physician. They befriend neighbor Jud Crandall, who takes them to an isolated pet cemetery (misspelled "sematary") in the forest behind the Creeds' home.

Louis encounters Victor Pascow, a jogger who is fatally injured after being hit by a truck. He warns Louis about the pet cemetery before dying, calling Louis by name though they have never met. That night, Pascow's ghost leads Louis to the cemetery and warns him not to cross the barrier. Louis awakens from the supposed dream to find his feet covered in dirt.

During Thanksgiving, while the family is gone, Church is hit by a truck and killed. Realizing Ellie will be devastated, Jud takes Louis beyond the pet cemetery and deep into the woods, to an ancient Miꞌkmaq burial ground. Jud instructs Louis to bury the cat and warns him not to tell anyone about what they have done. The next day, a reanimated Church returns to the house. He now stinks, moves sluggishly, his eyes glow gold and he is vicious toward Louis. Jud explains that as a boy he revived his pet dog and that, although the cat might be different, it will save Ellie the grief of losing her pet.

Sometime later, Gage is killed by a truck along the same highway. Jud anticipates that Louis is considering burying his son in the Miꞌkmaq ground, although Louis denies it. Jud believes that introducing Louis to the ritual ground aroused the malevolent forces present there, which caused Gage's death. He tells Louis the story of a local named Bill Baterman, who buried his young son Timmy in the Miꞌkmaq ground after he was killed near the end of World War II. Timmy returned as a malevolent entity, terrifying the townsfolk. A group of men including Jud tried destroying Timmy by lighting the Baterman house on fire, only for Bill to perish with Timmy. Jud insists that the burial ground is evil and Louis must not bury Gage there, adding that "sometimes, dead is better".

After the funeral, Rachel and Ellie leave for Chicago while Louis stays behind, ostensibly to take care of loose ends. Despite Pascow and Jud's warnings, Louis exhumes Gage's body and buries him at the ritual site. In Chicago, Pascow appears to Ellie in a dream and warns her that Louis is about to do something terrible. Rachel is unnerved by Ellie's dream but can only reach Jud when she calls, who tells her Louis is not home. She decides to return to Maine, much to Jud's alarm.

That night, the reanimated Gage returns home and steals a scalpel from Louis' bag. He taunts Jud before murdering him. Rachel returns home and is lured into Jud's house by the specter of her dead sister Zelda Goldman, only to discover that she is actually seeing Gage, holding a scalpel. In shock and disbelief, Rachel reaches down to hug Gage and he kills her.

Waking up from his sleep, Louis notices Gage's muddy footprints in the house and finds his scalpel missing. Receiving a phone call from Gage that he has "played" with Jud and Rachel, he fills three syringes with morphine and heads to Jud's house. Encountering Church, he kills the cat with an injection before entering the house. After Louis finds Jud's body under his bed, Gage taunts him further and Louis is startled by Rachel's body hanging from the attic before Gage attacks him.

After a brief battle, Louis overpowers Gage and injects him with the morphine syringe. He then lights Jud's house on fire, leaving it to burn as he carries Rachel's body to the burial ground. Pascow appears and warns Louis not to "make it worse", but Louis, grief-stricken to the point of insanity, believes that he waited too long when he buried Gage, but burying Rachel "will work this time". That night, Rachel returns to Louis and they embrace. Rachel takes a large knife from the counter, and the screen cuts to black before Louis screams.

== Cast ==
- Dale Midkiff as Louis Creed
- Fred Gwynne as Jud Crandall
- Denise Crosby as Rachel Goldman-Creed
  - Elizabeth Ureneck as Young Rachel Goldman
- Miko Hughes as Gage Creed
- Blaze Berdahl as Ellen "Ellie" Creed
- Brad Greenquist as Victor Pascow
- Michael Lombard as Irwin Goldman
- Susan Blommaert as Missy Dandridge
- Kavi Raz as Steve Masterton
- Mary Louise Wilson as Dory Goldman
- Andrew Hubatsek as Zelda Goldman
- Stephen King as Minister
- Chuck Courtney as Bill Baterman

== Production ==
=== Development ===
The film rights to Pet Sematary were sold to George A. Romero in 1984 for $10,000. Stephen King had previously declined several other offers for a film adaptation. Romero eventually had to pull out of the production, as he was busy with Monkey Shines. Development executive Lindsay Doran loved the finished script and advocated for it to be made at Embassy Pictures and then at Paramount Pictures, after she became vice president of production there in 1985. She was told each time that there was no more demand for Stephen King films after the slew of adaptations from his novels released in the early '80s.

It was only during the 1988 Writers Guild of America strike that Paramount reconsidered because the studio was facing a possible shortage of new productions for 1989 release. Stephen King's script for Pet Sematary was finished and ready to go, so Doran was given the greenlight to obtain the rights for Paramount and start production. King, who had final say on the choice of a director, met with the studio's first choice of Mary Lambert. She impressed him with her enthusiasm for his novels and her commitment to stay faithful to his source material, which secured her the job.

The original cut of the film delivered to Paramount's executives was judged to be too long, so excess footage had to be removed. The original ending scene was more ambiguous: it showed only the undead Rachel Goldman Creed (Denise Crosby) entering the kitchen where Louis Creed (Dale Midkiff) is playing solitaire, leaving his fate uncertain. Although Lambert called this the "more spooky, sad... tragic" ending, because the audience knows "it's not going to be what he wants. She's not coming back as his wife", the studio decided it was too tame and at their request it was re-shot to be more graphic. Rachel's appearance was made far more gruesome with special prosthetic effects, and she kills Louis at the end as suggested by his screams when the film cuts to black.

=== Casting ===
Initially, Paramount executives wanted a pair of twins to play the role of Gage Creed, which was the more cost-effective option. However, Lambert was very impressed with two-year-old Miko Hughes, who she felt was a natural talent despite his young age, so she lobbied the studio to accept her choice. She also faced resistance from executives over her choice to cast Fred Gwynne, whom the studio believed audiences would not take seriously because of his fame as Herman Munster. After first auditioning girls for the role of Zelda Goldman, Lambert changed course and ended up casting Andrew Hubatsek in the role, because she felt having a grown man playing the role of a teenage girl deformed by spinal meningitis made the character more frightening.

=== Filming ===
As stipulated by King when selling the rights, Pet Sematary was shot in Maine where the story was set and King himself wrote the screenplay. Production was based in Ellsworth and auditions held at The Grand theater, where several hundred locals auditioned to be extras or for small spoken roles. King himself was very involved in the filming process, consulting with Lambert frequently on her ideas for the story and any deviations from the script she wished to make.

The house used for the Creeds' home is a private residence near Hancock, while Jud Crandall (Gwynne)'s house across the street was actually a facade constructed around an existing house that was insulated with fireproof material so that the mock-up could be burned around it. The interiors of the Creed house were recreated on a soundstage in Ellsworth, while the interiors of Jud's house were built inside the Bangor Arsenal. The approach to the Miꞌkmaq burial ground was filmed at an abandoned granite quarry on Mount Desert Island in Acadia National Park, while a hilltop near Sedgwick was the site of the Miꞌkmaq ground itself. Other locations included a forest near Ellsworth for the pet cemetery, Mount Hope Cemetery in Bangor for the graveyard scenes, and Ellsworth Town Hall, which stood in for the hospital of the University of Maine, Orono.

== Music ==
The film's score was written by Elliot Goldenthal. The film features two songs by the Ramones, one of Stephen King's favorite bands: "Sheena Is a Punk Rocker" appears in a scene, and "Pet Sematary", a new track written specially for the picture, plays over the credits.

The song "Pet Sematary" became one of the Ramones' biggest charting hits, reaching number four on Billboard's Modern Rock Tracks chart, despite being, in the words of AllMusic, "reviled by most of the band's hardcore fans".

Lambert was better known for her work directing music videos, especially those for Madonna including "Like a Prayer" and "Material Girl". Through her work in the music industry she was friends with the Ramones. She approached them about recording a song for the film and they agreed to write and perform "Pet Sematary", which is featured in the closing credits.

== Release ==
The Los Angeles Times wrote that the film "defied the critics and opened at blockbuster levels". The film grossed $57 million in the United States.

== Reception ==
=== Critical reception ===
On Metacritic, the film has a weighted average score of 38 out of 100 based on 12 critics, indicating "generally unfavorable reviews". Audiences surveyed by CinemaScore gave the film a grade "B".

Variety called it "undead schlock dulled by a slasher-film mentality". Vincent Canby of The New York Times wrote that the film "has some effectively ghoulish moments" but "fails mostly because it doesn't trust the audience to do any of the work". Gene Siskel of the Chicago Tribune gave the film zero stars out of four and called it "sickening." Kevin Thomas of the Los Angeles Times wrote, "Lambert goes for strong, succinct images and never stops to worry whether there's a lack of credibility or motivation."

Richard Harrington of The Washington Post called it "bland, clichéd, cheap". Harrington criticized Gage's actions as disturbing and the climax as "an ugly payoff to an inept setup". Philip Strick of The Monthly Film Bulletin wrote, "The family feuds and loyalties which lend some coherence to the novel and justify its punchline ... are simply plundered for their shock effect en route to the final bloodletting. Emaciated, then, rather than enhanced by its adaptation, Pet Semetary as a movie is nevertheless strikingly well-told." Film historian Leonard Maltin called the picture a "BOMB" (his lowest possible rating) and declared, "Despite being a box-office smash, this picture's contempt for its audience should be obvious even to undiscriminating moviegoers...Still, vastly superior to its sequel."

Bloody Disgusting rated it 4.5/5 stars and wrote, "The plot alone would make for a scary movie, but by injecting excellent atmosphere, capable acting and generally nightmarish scenes, Pet Sematary is a truly effective horror flick and well worth the price of admission." At Dread Central, Steve Barton rated it 4/5 stars and called it one of the best King adaptations; Jason Jenkins rated it 3.5/5 stars and called it "one of the better King adaptations of the period".

Pet Sematary was ranked #16 on IFC's list of the best Stephen King film and television adaptations, and also placed at 16 on Rolling Stone's Top 30 King adaptations.

Rotten Tomatoes, a review aggregator, reports that 56% of 43 surveyed critics gave the film a positive review; the average rating is 5.8/10. The website's critical consensus reads, "Pet Sematary is a bruising horror flick that wears its quirks on its sleeves, to the detriment of its scare factor."

=== Box office ===
The film grossed $57.5 million in the United States.

== Home media ==
Pet Sematary was a top-renting VHS upon release. Paramount released it on DVD in 2006 and on Blu-ray in 2012. Pet Sematary was released on 4K UHD Blu-ray on March 26, 2019, and grossed $595,254.

== Legacy ==
=== Sequel ===
A sequel, Pet Sematary Two, was released in 1992 to poor reviews and a disappointing box office. Although it references the events of the first film, the sequel focuses on all-new characters.

=== Documentary ===
A documentary, Unearthed & Untold: The Path to Pet Sematary, premiered in September 2014, and was released in January 2017.

=== 2019 film ===
There was intermittent buzz about a possible adaptation of Pet Sematary. Juan Carlos Fresnadillo was announced to direct an adaptation in October 2013, but nothing came of it.

In August 2017, the brother-sister team behind the 2017 adaptation of Stephen King's It, Andy and Barbara Muschietti, told the Toronto Sun that they hoped to adapt Pet Sematary after the sequel to It. Again, there was no further action.

Finally, in December 2017 Paramount Pictures announced that it was remaking the film, with Jeff Buhler penning the script and Kevin Kölsch and Dennis Widmyer set to direct. The new adaptation stars Jason Clarke and Amy Seimetz as Louis and Rachel Creed, with John Lithgow appearing as Jud Crandall. The movie began filming in Montreal, Canada, in June 2018 and was released on April 5, 2019.

=== 2023 spinoff film ===
Another spinoff film was released in 2023, titled Pet Sematary: Bloodlines.
