= Magic Rock =

Magic Rock may refer to:

- Magic Rock Brewing, an English brewing company in Huddersfield, West Yorkshire
- Magic Rock (film), a 2001 comedy-drama film
