= Camp Cody =

Camp Cody may refer to:

- Camp Cody, New Mexico
- Camp Cody (summer camp)
