= She Said =

She Said may refer to:

- She Said (book), a 2019 nonfiction book about the exposure of film producer Harvey Weinstein's sexual abuse
  - She Said (film), a 2022 film based on the nonfiction book
- "She Said" (Plan B song), 2010
- "She Said" (The Pharcyde song),1995
- "She Said" (Collective Soul song), 1998
- "She Said", a song by Barclay James Harvest from the 1971 album Once Again
- "She Said", a song by actor Brie Larson from the 2005 album Finally Out of P.E.
- "She Said", a song by Longpigs from the 1996 album The Sun Is Often Out
- "She Said", a song by Scooter from the 1997 album Age of Love
- She Said (album), an album by Starcrawler

== See also ==
- "She Said She Said", a 1966 song by The Beatles from Revolver
- Leavin' Trunk/She Said, She Said, a limited edition vinyl single by The Black Keys
