= Devour You =

Studio album by Starcrawler
- Released: October 11, 2019
- Recorded: 2018–2019
- Studio: Sunset Studios
- Genre: Alternative rock, punk rock
- Length: 40:00
- Label: Rough Trade
- Producer: Nick Launay

Starcrawler chronology
Starcrawler (2018)	Devour You (2019)	She Said (2022)

Singles from Devour You
- 1. "Hollywood Ending" Released: November 16, 2018; 2. "She Gets Around" Released: February 26, 2019; 3. "Bet My Brains" Released: August 1, 2019; 4. "No More Pennies" Released: September 26, 2019

Devour You is the second studio album by American rock band Starcrawler. The album was released on October 11, 2019 by Rough Trade Records. The record was produced by Nick Launay, who previously worked for bands as Yeah Yeah Yeahs, Arcade Fire and Nick Cave and the Bad Seeds.

== Critical reception ==
Professional ratings
Aggregate scores
Source	Rating
AnyDecentMusic?	6.8/10
Metacritic	72/100
Review scores
Source	Rating
AllMusic	3/5 stars
Under the Radar	6.5/10 stars
The Times	4/5 stars
Exclaim!	3.5/5 stars
DIY	3.5/5 stars
Q	4/5 stars
Louder Than War	8/10
Uncut	3.5/5 stars

Devour You received positive reviews from music critics upon its release. At Metacritic, which assigns a normalized rating out of 100 to reviews from mainstream publications, the album received an average score of 72, based on 7 reviews.

AnyDecentMusic? collated reviews giving the album an average score of 6.8 based upon 7 reviews.

== Track listing ==
All lyrics are written by Starcrawler.

No.	Title	Length
1.	"Lizzy"	2:56
2.	"Bet My Brains"	3:53
3.	"Home Alone"	2:32
4.	"No More Pennies"	3:47
5.	"You Dig Yours"	2:40
6.	"Toy Teenager"	1:07
7.	"Hollywood Ending"	3:25
8.	"She Gets Around"	3:13
9.	"I Don't Need You"	3:05
10.	"Rich Taste"	3:26
11.	"Born Asleep"	5:02
12.	"Tank Top"	1:18
13.	"Call Me a Baby"	3:37
Total length:		40:00

Japanese bonus track
No.	Title	Length
14.	"Pet Sematary" (Ramones cover)	3:23

Notes

- First pressings have a typo of the band's name, with "STARCRAWLER" stylized as "STARCRAWER".
- "Pet Sematary" is a cover version of the Ramones song featured in the motion picture soundtrack for the self-titled film Pet Sematary. The track is included in the album exclusively for Japan.
- The band's label, Rough Trade, also released a limited edition, deluxe version of the album that was pressed on blood-red marbled vinyl, and came in a scratch & sniff sleeve (the rose on the cover can be scratched and it smells like a rose).

== Charts ==
Chart (2019)	Peak position
Scottish Albums (OCC)	74
US Heatseekers Albums (Billboard)	14
US Independent Albums (Billboard)	44
US Top Alternative Albums (Billboard)	25
US Top Rock Albums (Billboard)	49
