= Pet Sematary Two =

1992 film by Mary Lambert

- Theatrical release poster
- Directed by: Mary Lambert
- Written by: Richard Outten
- Based on: Pet Sematary by Stephen King
- Produced by: Ralph S. Singleton; Shashank Shambharkar
- Starring: Edward Furlong; Anthony Edwards; Clancy Brown; Jared Rushton
- Cinematography: Russell Carpenter
- Edited by: Tom Finan
- Music by: Mark Governor
- Production company: Columbus Circle Films
- Distributed by: Paramount Pictures
- Release date: August 28, 1992
- Running time: 100 minutes
- Country: United States
- Language: English
- Budget: $8 million
- Box office: $17.1 million

Pet Sematary Two is a 1992 American supernatural horror film directed by Mary Lambert and written by Richard Outten. It is the sequel to the film Pet Sematary (1989), which was based on Stephen King's 1983 novel of the same name and the second film in the Pet Sematary film series. The film stars Edward Furlong, Anthony Edwards and Clancy Brown. The film follows a L.A. veterinarian and his 13 year-old son move to Ludlow, Maine to rebuild their lives after a family tragedy. When the boy's new friend loses his dog, they conduct a secret burial at an infamous pet cemetery, starting a terrifying chain of events.

Pet Sematary Two was theatrically released in the United States on August 28, 1992, by Paramount Pictures. The film grossed $17.1 million domestically on a budget of $8 million and received mostly negative reviews from critics upon release, however in subsequent years it has developed a cult following.

== Plot ==
A few years after the events of the first film and following the accidental death of his mother Renee Hallow-Matthews, 13-year-old Jeff Matthews and his veterinarian father, Chase, move to Ludlow, Maine, Renee's hometown. He's introduced to the belligerent town sheriff, Gus Gilbert, and his stepson, Drew, whom Gus abuses relentlessly. Jeff also draws the ire of local bully Clyde Parker, who tells him the story of the Creed family and the legend of the Miꞌkmaq Indian burial ground.

One night, Gus shoots and kills Drew's beloved dog Zowie after the dog disturbs him during sex. Drew asks Jeff to help him bury Zowie in the Miꞌkmaq burial ground to see if the rumors are true that it can resurrect the dead. Zowie does indeed return from the dead but is uncharacteristically fierce. Chase treats Zowie for his gunshot wound, which refuses to heal; even more bizarre is the fact that Zowie has no heartbeat. Chase sends a sample of Zowie's blood to a lab. It turns out that Zowie's cells have completely deteriorated and are no different from those of a dead canine.

Jeff and Drew go to the Pet Semetery on Halloween for a night of horror stories with local boys. When Gus finds out that Drew's mother Amanda allowed him to go despite being grounded, he rushes to the cemetery and breaks up the party. He attacks Drew, but just as he is about to hit him with a grave marker, Zowie suddenly appears. Zowie fatally mauls Gus, whom the boys subsequently bury at the Indian burial ground. Gus returns to life; he now moves stiffly and rarely speaks, but treats Drew better. Over time, Gus becomes increasingly crude and sadistic, sexually assaulting Amanda and brutally skinning the pet rabbits for dinner.

Zowie breaks out of the veterinary clinic and kills three kittens before entering Chase's home and attacking him. A day later, Jeff encounters Clyde, who is about to sever Jeff's nose using the wheel spokes of his own bicycle when Gus shows up. He sends Jeff home, then murders Clyde as Drew looks on. Gus then pursues Drew to their house, where he is trapped with the savage Zowie. Drew escapes through a window just as Amanda arrives home in her car, and the two take off. Gus pursues them at high speed in his squad car, eventually killing them both by ramming their car into an oncoming potato truck. Gus then returns to Clyde's body and puts it in a body bag, intending to take it to the burial ground as well.

After Drew's funeral, Jeff decides to reanimate Renee by using the Indian burial ground's power. Gus exhumes her corpse and brings it to Jeff at the burial ground. When Chase hears that Renee's grave has been robbed, he rushes to the Gilbert house. There, he is attacked by Zowie and Gus, and he shoots them both dead.

Upon coming back to life, Renee stabs and kills Marjorie Hargrove, the Matthews' housekeeper. Jeff confronts the undead Renee in the attic, and they embrace. Chase arrives home and urges Jeff to get away from Renee, who says she wants to spend quality time with Chase. An undead Clyde arrives and, after knocking Chase out, tries to kill Jeff — first with an axe and then with an ice skate. Renee locks Chase, Jeff and Clyde in the attic, which she then sets on fire.

Jeff kills Clyde with a severed livewire and then breaks down the attic door to escape. Not letting both Jeff and Chase leave, Renee says that she wants the three of them to work things out. Renee wants Jeff to stay and join her in death, saying she loves him. Jeff drags Chase out of the house as Renee is destroyed by the flames while shrieking "Dead is better!" Later, a recovering Chase locks up his veterinary clinic before he and Jeff leave Ludlow behind.

== Cast ==
- Edward Furlong as Jeff Matthews
- Anthony Edwards as Dr. Chase Matthews
- Clancy Brown as Sheriff Gus Gilbert
- Jared Rushton as Clyde Parker
- Darlanne Fluegel as Renee Hallow-Matthews
- Jason McGuire as Drew Gilbert
- Sarah Trigger as Marjorie Hargrove
- Lisa Waltz as Amanda Gilbert
- Jim Peck as Quentin Yolander
- Wilbur Fitzgerald as Assistant Director
- Robert Easton as Priest
- Joe Dorsey as Caretaker

== Production ==
Paramount was anxious to follow up on the success of Pet Sematary with a sequel and invited Mary Lambert to return and direct. She has stated that her original concept for the film would have involved Ellie Creed (Blaze Berdahl) as the central character, the only survivor from the first film. However, Paramount was not confident in making the film's lead a teenage girl, so the story was written with completely new characters and a male protagonist, Jeff Matthews. Thirteen-year-old Edward Furlong was cast in the lead role, capitalizing on his rise to fame in the previous year's blockbuster Terminator 2: Judgment Day. Shooting took place in Coweta County, Georgia between January 13, 1992 and March 5, 1992.

According to Mary Lambert the MPAA threatened to give the film an NC-17 rating unless she cut out certain scenes: "I had to fight even to get that R rating. I had to take a lot of stuff out that I really liked."

== Release ==
Stephen King, who wrote the novel upon which the first film was based, had his name removed from the film prior to its release. The film debuted at #3.

== Reception ==
=== Box office ===
The film opened in 1,852 theaters on August 28, 1992, and debuted at number three at the box office, grossing $4,825,100 during its opening weekend.

=== Critical response ===
==== Contemporary ====
Stephen Holden of The New York Times wrote that the film "is much better at special effects than at creating characters or telling a coherent story". Kevin Thomas of the Los Angeles Times wrote, "Not nearly as scary as the 1989 original, it nonetheless expresses and attempts to resolve in bold mythological terms the anxieties of being 13." Variety wrote, "Pet Sematary Two is about 50% better than its predecessor, which is to say it's not very good at all." Richard Harrington of The Washington Post likened it to "an elongated Tales from the Crypt" episode and criticized the script as a rehash of the original. Jay Carr of The Boston Globe called it "better entertainment than the first Pet Sematary" but more of a remake than a sequel. Dave Kehr of the Chicago Tribune wrote, "Here is the proof, if any were needed, that a woman can make a movie just as violent, stupid and venal as any man... Although Pet Sematary II appears to have been seriously intended, the audience immediately transforms it into a comedy, roaring with delight over every grisly incident and clumsy line."

In a positive review, Rene Rodriguez of The Miami Herald writes, "There are scenes in this movie that are so crisply edited, so skillfully shot, and so ... so out there, you'll have to fight off the urge to applaud." Rodriguez in particular praised Lambert's direction, noting that halfway through the movie she "begins to indulge in small, wonderfully twisted scenes that are as creepy and unnerving as any horror film in recent memory" and that the film is "gleefully played out with an intelligent sense of wicked humor." Betsy Pickle of the Knoxville News Sentinel wrote that the film "takes all the bad-movie elements of the original and twists them into thrills, chills and fun" and that Outten's screenplay "sorts through real emotions yet doesn't shortchange the action." Pickle also notes Lambert "uses her experience as a video director to pace the film deftly" and that "she makes good use of music."

==== Retrospective ====
Patrick Naugle of DVD Verdict wrote, "Everything about Pet Sematary Two stinks like the dead." Rotten Tomatoes, a review aggregator, reports that 20% of 25 critics gave the film a positive review. The site's consensus reads: "Not realizing that it had no unfinished business, Pet Sematary rises from the grave once more to beat an undead corpse." On Metacritic, the film has a weighted average score of 35 out of 100 based on 11 critics, indicating "generally unfavorable reviews". Audiences polled by CinemaScore gave the film an average grade of "B" on an A+ to F scale.

=== Accolades ===
Clancy Brown was nominated for Best Supporting Actor at the 1993 Fangoria Chainsaw Awards for his portrayal of Gus Gilbert, but lost to Anthony Hopkins for his performance in Bram Stoker's Dracula.

== Home media ==
Paramount Home Video released Pet Sematary Two on VHS on April 21, 1993, and on DVD in September 2001. Shout Factory released it on Blu-ray on February 25, 2020.

The original score / soundtrack album was released on CD as a limited edition from La-La Land Records on August 29, 2019, on limited-edition vinyl on October 11, 2019, and on audio cassette on September 3, 2019, from Terror Vision Records.

== See also ==
- List of films set around Halloween
