= Michael Lombard =

American actor (1934–2020)

- Born: Michael Labombarda; August 8, 1934; Brooklyn, New York City, New York, U.S.
- Died: August 13, 2020 (aged 86)

Michael Lombard born Michael Labombarda (August 8, 1934 – August 13, 2020) was an American actor. His parents, both from Giovinazzo, Bari, Italy, immigrated to America and settled in Gravesend, Brooklyn. In 1977, he was nominated for a Drama Desk Award for his performance in Otherwise Engaged. In 1991, he won an Obie Award for his performance in What's Wrong With This Picture? On television, Lombard portrayed Marshall Beck in all 15 episodes of Filthy Rich (1982-1983). Between 1976 and 2005 he had guest roles in such popular American television series as Kojak (a 2-part episode), The Mary Tyler Moore Hour (9 episodes), The Rockford Files (a 2-part episode), Three’s Company, Riptide, Spenser: For Hire, Miami Vice, The Cosby Show, and 4 episodes of Law & Order and its spinoffs. He played a different character on 4 episodes of Barney Miller.

== Partial filmography ==
- Who? (1974) - Dr. Besser
- Network (1976) - Willie Stein
- Fatso (1980) - Charlie
- So Fine (1981) - Jay Augustine
- Garbo Talks (1984) - Mr. Morganelli
- Prizzi's Honor (1985) - Rosario Filargi / Robert Finlay
- Crocodile Dundee (1986) - Sam Charlton
- Pet Sematary (1989) - Irwin Goldman
- Second Sight (1989) - Bishop O'Linn
- Millions (1991) - Tony Steiner
- The Devil's Advocate (1997) - Judge Poe
- Rounders (1998) - District Attorney Shields
- The Thomas Crown Affair (1999) - Bobby McKinley
- Puppet (1999) - Ulianov
- Dead Canaries (2003) - Mayor
- La Vraie Vie des profs (2013) - Professeur De Dessin (final film role)
- Unearthed & Untold: The Path to Pet Sematary (2017) - Himself (Documentary film)
