= 14 Women =

American film

- Film poster
- Directed by: Mary Lambert
- Produced by: Nicole Boxer; Sharon Oreck
- Starring: Annette Bening, Kay Bailey Hutchison, Blanche Lincoln
- Narrated by: Annette Bening
- Music by: Jamshied Sharifi
- Release date: June 14, 2007 (Silverdocs)
- Running time: 80 minutes
- Country: United States
- Language: English

14 Women is a 2007 documentary film directed by Mary Lambert and narrated by Annette Bening. The film released on June 14, 2007 as part of Silverdocs, and focuses on several female Senators serving in the 109th United States Congress.

== Synopsis ==
The film examines the 109th United States Congress. When it convened, there were fourteen women in the Senate: Barbara Boxer, Maria Cantwell, Hillary Clinton, Susan Collins, Elizabeth Dole, Dianne Feinstein, Kay Bailey Hutchison, Mary Landrieu, Blanche Lincoln (Lambert’s sister), Barbara Mikulski, Lisa Murkowski, Patty Murray, Olympia Snowe, and Debbie Stabenow. The documentary features interviews with several people, including the Senators' family members, Delaware Senator Joe Biden, and singer Alanis Morissette.

== Reception ==
Politico.com and DVD Talk both gave positive reviews for 14 Women, with DVD Talk commented that while it was "far from definitive", the film has "admirable aims and will probably play well with schoolkids." Variety gave a more mixed response to the film, saying that "Political junkies, idealistic schoolgirls and everyone in between will be thrilled to vary-ing degrees" by the film but that it also felt like a "recruitment vid for public service".
