= Gage Creed =

Fictional character from the novel Pet Sematary

- Pet Sematary character
- First appearance: Pet Sematary (1983)
- Last appearance: Pet Sematary (2019)
- Created by: Stephen King
- Portrayed by: Pet Sematary (1989 film) Miko Hughes; 2019 remake Hugo and Lucas Lavoie; The Shining (miniseries) Stephen King

In-universe information
- Occupation: Child
- Family: Louis Creed (father); Rachel Creed (mother); Ellie Creed (sister)
- Relatives: Zelda (aunt; deceased)
- Home: Ludlow, Maine

Gage William Creed is a fictional character created by Stephen King who is the main antagonist of the 1983 novel Pet Sematary. In the novel, Gage is an innocent child who is accidentally killed by a speeding tanker truck. Gage's grieving father Louis brings him back to life by burying him in the titular cemetery, which is possessed by a Wendigo. Once reanimated, Gage is controlled by the Wendigo's evil spirit and murders his mother, Rachel, and their neighbor, Jud Crandall. Gage was portrayed in the 1989 film adaptation of the novel by Miko Hughes. He was portrayed in the 2019 remake by twins Hugo and Lucas Lavoie. Gage was also portrayed in a small cameo appearance by his creator, Stephen King, in the 1997 miniseries adaptation of The Shining. Gage is briefly mentioned in King's 1994 novel Insomnia, though he never makes an appearance.

== Fictional character biography ==
Gage Creed is the 2-year-old son of Louis and Rachel Creed and the younger brother to Ellie Creed. Before his death and eventual resurrection, Gage appears to be a typical toddler. He and his family move to Ludlow, Maine, from Chicago, Illinois, and become friends with their neighbor Jud Crandall. However, the family notices that their new house is located right next to a busy highway and there is a cemetery for animals in their backyard called the "Pet Sematary". One day, the Creeds and Jud are having a picnic in their yard, and Gage is playing with a kite. The kite begins blowing away and Gage starts chasing it, unaware he is heading into the busy highway. His father tries to catch up to him but doesn't make it in time, and Gage is struck and killed by a speeding tanker truck. In his grief, Louis takes his son to the ancient burial ground introduced to him by Jud after their cat, Church, was killed. Louis buries Gage there, and his son is possessed by the spirit of a Wendigo and resurrected.

Once Gage returns to life, he murders Jud and calls for his mother to come to him. He then kills his mother and taunts his father. Louis then puts his son out of his misery and the Wendigo's reign of terror to an end by injecting him with a lethal dose of morphine.

== Inspiration and adaptations ==
The inspiration for the character was King's own son, Owen, who, as a toddler, had been stopped from running into the road while flying a kite. The King family was then staying in a spooky house in Orrington, Maine – a place which had a real pet cemetery.

Gage is portrayed in the 1989 film adaptation by Miko Hughes. While the film itself garnered mixed reviews, Hughes' portrayal of Gage was universally acclaimed for the chilling performance given by such a small child. Two-year old Russell Graves also played the part as a stand-in and double for Hughes. Graves was cast when the film was shot on location in Ellsworth, Maine, and appears as Gage in the kite-flying scene. A mannequin was also used to portray the character in scenes after he has been reanimated.

In the 2019 remake, Gage was portrayed by twins Hugo and Lucas Lavoie. In this adaptation, Gage and Ellie switch roles; Ellie is killed by the tanker, only to be reanimated as a murderous revenant, and tries to kill her entire family. Gage ends up being the only assumed survivor of the story, as each member of the Creed family is killed by Ellie and possessed by the Wendigo. The film ends with Gage safely in a car with the possessed Creed family returning to the car, motioning for Gage to unlock the car door.

Gage was portrayed in a small cameo appearance by his creator, Stephen King, in the 1997 miniseries adaptation of The Shining. In the cameo, Gage appears as an orchestra conductor during one of Jack Torrance's hallucinations.

== Reception ==
The death of Gage in King's original novel was described by many at the time as "shocking" and "heartbreaking". The character's eventual turn into the primary antagonist of the story led to him being considered as one of the best and most terrifying Stephen King characters. The portrayal of the character in the 1989 film by Miko Hughes was widely praised despite the film itself receiving mixed reviews.

=== Literary analysis ===
Gage Creed has also been the subject of scholarly works discussing what he represents. In Frankenstein's Monster: Hubris and Death in Stephen King's Oeuvre, Heidi Strengell draws parallels between Gage Creed and Frankenstein's monster. Both Gage and the Creature suffer the consequences of their father's/creator's hubris when defying God and attempting to create life. The Creature is driven to evil by hardship, whereas Gage has had his soul replaced entirely by evil. According to Steven Bruhm in Nightmare on Sesame Street: or, The Self-Possessed Child, Gage represents the loss of innocence when he is resurrected as a creature wise beyond his years.
