= Starcrawler (album) =

Studio album by Starcrawler
- Released: January 19, 2018
- Recorded: 2016–2017
- Studio: PAX AM, Los Angeles, California
- Genre: Garage rock, punk rock
- Length: 27:55
- Label: Rough Trade
- Producer: Ryan Adams

Starcrawler chronology
Starcrawler (2018)	Devour You (2019)

Singles from Starcrawler
- 1. "Let Her Be" Released: September 6, 2017; 2. "I Love LA" Released: November 13, 2017; 3. "Love's Gone Again" Released: May 1, 2018; 4. "Chicken Woman" Released: June 12, 2018

Starcrawler is the debut studio album by American rock band Starcrawler. The album was released on January 19, 2018 by Rough Trade Records and produced by Ryan Adams.

== Critical reception ==
Professional ratings
Aggregate scores
Source	Rating
Metacritic	71/100
Review scores
Source	Rating
Exclaim!	7/10
The Independent	3/5 stars
Classic Rock	3.5/5 stars

Starcrawler was met with "generally favorable" reviews from critics. At Metacritic, which assigns a weighted average rating out of 100 to reviews from mainstream publications, this release received an average score of 71, based on 7 reviews. Aggregator Album of the Year gave the release a 70 out of 100 based on a critical consensus of 4 reviews.

== Track listing ==
All lyrics are written by Starcrawler.

No.	Title	Length
1.	"Train"	1:22
2.	"Love's Gone Again"	2:26
3.	"I Love LA"	3:18
4.	"Different Angles"	1:58
5.	"Chicken Woman"	3:57
6.	"Pussy Tower"	2:10
7.	"Full of Pride"	1:55
8.	"Let Her Be"	3:46
9.	"Tears"	3:03
10.	"What I Want"	3:56
Total length:		27:55

Japanese bonus tracks
No.	Title	Length
11.	"Used To Know"	2:04
12.	"Castaway"	2:36
13.	"Ants"	1:52
Total length:		34:28

== Personnel ==
Adapted from album booklet and AllMusic.

Starcrawler

- Arrow de Wilde – lead vocals, composition
- Henri Cash – guitar, synthesizer, vocals, composition
- Timothy Franco – bass, composition
- Austin Smith – drums, composition

Additional personnel

- Ryan Adams – production
- Autumn de Wilde – photographer
- Gavin Lurssen – mastering
- Charlie Stavish – engineering, mixing
- Mike Zimmerman – design

== Charts ==
Chart (2018)	Peak position
US Heatseekers Albums (Billboard)	15
US Independent Albums (Billboard)	43
