= Zeus and Roxanne =

1997 film by George T. Miller

- Theatrical release poster
- Directed by: George T. Miller
- Written by: Tom Benedek
- Produced by: Frank Price; Gene Rosow; Ludi Boeken
- Starring: Steve Guttenberg; Kathleen Quinlan; Miko Hughes
- Cinematography: David Connell
- Edited by: Harry Hitner
- Music by: Bruce Rowland
- Production company: Rysher Entertainment
- Distributed by: MGM Distribution Co.
- Release date: January 24, 1997
- Running time: 98 minutes
- Country: United States
- Language: English
- Box office: $7.2 million

Zeus and Roxanne is a 1997 American family adventure film directed by George T. Miller. It revolves around the friendship between a dog, Zeus, and a dolphin, Roxanne, and the relationships between the human characters played by Steve Guttenberg, Kathleen Quinlan, and Miko Hughes.

Produced by Rysher Entertainment, the film released theatrically in the United States on January 24, 1997, by MGM Distribution Co., grossing $7.2 million. The film received mixed reviews from critics.

== Plot ==
One morning, a dog named Zeus goes to the pier, spots a dolphin, and becomes fascinated by its movements. Afterwards, he returns home to his owner, Terry Barnett, an aspiring musician, and his son, Jordan, who appears to be taking care of him. Later that morning, Zeus chases a cat and subsequently destroys the outdoor garden of Mary Beth Dunhill, a marine biologist and the Barnetts' next-door neighbor. Terry calms Zeus down and apologizes to Mary Beth, although she is agitated by him.

Mary Beth later goes to her workplace and is followed by Zeus, who notices her photo of the same dolphin from earlier. Upon arriving, she is met by her research partner, Becky, and her rival, Claude Carver. Mary Beth and Becky travel out to the ocean on a boat to follow the dolphin they are researching, whom they name Roxanne, and Zeus stows away with them. However, while in the middle of the ocean, he slips off. Roxanne saves him from a shark and gives him a ride back to the boat on her back, which surprises and fascinates Mary Beth and Becky, who find that Zeus and Roxanne can do "inter-species communication". While stopping over on the way home with Zeus, Mary Beth spots her two impossible daughters, Judith and Nora, skating against her wishes. Arriving home, she asks Jordan if she could borrow Zeus for her research on Roxanne, who she hopes to release back into the wild. Jordan agrees, and he and Terry accompany her on her research.

During the following days, Terry begins to fall in love with Mary Beth as he manages to find inspiration for his music, while Jordan bonds with Judith and Nora. After Terry saves Judith and Nora while they are skating in a factory, Mary Beth asks him out on a date. After spending the night at a local beachside resort, they awkwardly kiss. Meanwhile, Claude, wanting research grant money to come to his research and not Mary Beth's, tries to steal hers, but winds up getting comically thwarted by Zeus. Then, he tries gaining the lead in her interspecies communication study, although his attempts to have one of his research dolphins bond with another animal fail one after another.

Through the conniving of Jordan, Judith, and Nora, Terry decides to move into Mary Beth's house with Jordan and Zeus, but after seeing a photo of his late wife, he decides to pursue his original plan of traveling to another town to continue writing his music. This causes both Zeus and Roxanne distress. While staying at a hotel with his owners, Zeus runs away back to Mary Beth's research center. Noticing his disappearance and realizing where he was going, Terry and Jordan return to town, while Mary Beth uses a submersible to go down and investigate the seabed after Claude claims Roxanne was caught in an illegal fishing net and killed. Zeus returns to the research center, where he is captured by Claude, who intends to use him as bait to lure out Roxanne, who is in fact alive, and capture her. However, Zeus and Roxanne work together to trap him and his assistant in a net, where they are arrested by police.

While exploring the seabed, Mary Beth's submersible's propeller is tangled in the fishing nets, and when she opens the main hatch thinking she'd escape through it, water begins flooding the interior. Roxanne leads Terry to Mary Beth, and he manages to free her from the trapped submersible. Afterwards, Jordan, Judith, and Nora convince him to marry her. During the wedding, she is given a grant for her research on Zeus and Roxanne. Immediately afterwards, a pod of dolphins appears, and Zeus convinces Roxanne to join them. Zeus watches happily with Terry, Mary Beth, Jordan, Judith, and Nora as Roxanne leaps into the air with the pod.

== Cast ==
- Steve Guttenberg as Terry Barnett
- Kathleen Quinlan as Mary Beth Dunhill
- Arnold Vosloo as Claude Carver
- Dawn McMillan as Becky
- Miko Hughes as Jordan Barnett
- Majandra Delfino as Judith Dunhill
- Jessica Howell as Nora Dunhill
- Tacquira LaTouche as Judith's Friend
- Duchess Tomasello as Mrs. Rice
- Shannon K. Foley as Linda
- Jim R. Coleman as Phil
- Alvin Farmer as Floyd
- Harri James as Airline Attendant
- Justin Humphrey as Craig
- James Stone as Security Guard
- Maury Covington as Reverend
- Michael A. Xynidis as Messenger
- Nathan R. Fitzgerald as Conga Line Dancer
- Benjamin Pettijohn as Additional "Zeus" Vocals
- David Nathaniel Hoyte as Lead Steel Pan Performer
- Jean Gilpin as Neighbor Lady
- Dennis Thomas as Musician #1
- Simeon Rolle as Musician #2
- Vince Strachan as Musician #3
- Michael Hoyte as Musician #4
- Al Guther as Helicopter Pilot

== Reception ==
Critical reception to the film was mixed. Lawrence Van Gelder of The New York Times said that "the tale of friendship between dog and dolphin never reaches the level of enchantment that is the sine qua non of enduring children's fiction. The scenes among the children suffer from the cutes, the scientific conflict remains on the level of a comic strip and the romance between the adults serves only as a reminder that both Ms. Quinlan (Apollo 13) and Mr. Guttenberg (Diner, et al.) have been seen to far better advantage." Kevin Thomas of the Los Angeles Times said the film was "way too contrived and gooey for most grown-ups [but] might well delight youngsters, especially its dramatic underwater sequences." Russell Smith of the Austin Chronicle called it "a bland but semi-palatable trash soup of leftovers from The Parent Trap, Flipper, and Benji." Peter Stack of the San Francisco Chronicle, reviewing the video release of the film, called it "a dopey adventure comedy wasting the talents of Steve Guttenberg and Kathleen Quinlan on an annoyingly preposterous plot about a scruffy dog that carries on meaningful conversations with a squeaky Flipper type." On Rotten Tomatoes, 33% of 9 reviews were positive, with an average rating of 5/10.

=== Box office ===
The film debuted at No. 10.
