= Brad Greenquist =

American actor (born 1959)

- Born: October 8, 1959 (age 66)
- Occupation: Actor
- Website: bradgreenquist.com

Brad Greenquist (born October 8, 1959) is an American actor.

== Career ==
Greenquist appeared in Pet Sematary, the 1989 film adaptation of Stephen King's 1983 novel of the same name, and in films such as The Diary of Ellen Rimbauer. From the 1990s he was seen as a guest star in various American television series, such as Charmed and ER.

Greenquist was director Steven Soderbergh's preferred choice for the role of Graham Dalton in Sex, Lies, and Videotape, after Kyle MacLachlan and Aidan Quinn turned down the role. However, the producers wanted a more well-known actor, so Soderbergh cast James Spader instead.

Greenquist made four appearances on various iterations of Star Trek. On Star Trek: Voyager, Greenquist appeared in the Season 3 episode "Warlord". He played the thief Krit in the Star Trek: Deep Space Nine sixth season episode "Who Mourns for Morn?". He also appeared in two separate Star Trek: Enterprise episodes. In the second season episode "Dawn," he played Khata'n Zshaar, and then in the fourth season, he played an unnamed Rigelian kidnapper. Because of these appearances, as well as others in science fiction, fantasy, and horror themed movies and television shows, Greenquist frequently appears on the convention circuit.

In addition he appeared on Stargate SG1 where, in episode 19 "Resurrection" of season 7, he played the German scientist Dr Keffler.

== Filmography ==
=== Film ===
- Mutants in Paradise (1984): Steve Awesome
- The Bedroom Window (1987): Carl Henderson
- The Chair (1989): 'Mushmouth'
- Pet Sematary (1989): Victor Pascow
- Loose Cannons (1990): Embassy Officer
- Gang Related (1997): Assistant District Attorney Richard Stein
- Inherit the Wind (1999): Tom Davenport
- The Puzzle in the Air (1999): Jeff Swerdling
- Crime and Punishment in Suburbia (2000): Calvin Berry
- Lost Souls (2000): George Viznik
- Ali (2001): Marlin Thomas
- Outside the Law (2002, direct-to-video): Agent McKenzie
- The Diary of Ellen Rimbauer (2003, made-for-TV): Doug Posey
- Momentum (2003, made-for-TV): Martin Elias
- Shiloh Falls (2007): Dalton
- Across the Hall (2009): The Porter
- The Cursed (2010): Fred Belmont
- Water for Elephants (2011): Mr. Robinson
- California Solo (2012): Piper
- The Lone Ranger (2013): Shareholder
- The Trials of Cate McCall (2013): Dr. Ennis
- Reality (2014): Jacques
- Annabelle: Creation (2017): Victor Palmeri
- Unearthed & Untold: The Path to Pet Sematary (2017, documentary film): Himself
- Where Are You (2019): Detective

=== Video games ===
- The Beast Within: A Gabriel Knight Mystery (1995): Georg Immerding
- Wing Commander: Prophecy (1997): Major Karl 'Spyder' Bowen
