= Susan Blommaert =

American actress (born 1947)

- Born: Susan J. Blommaert; October 13, 1947 (age 79); United States
- Occupation: Actress
- Years active: 1987–present

Susan J. Blommaert (born October 13, 1947) is an American actress. She is best known for her role as Mr. Kaplan on the drama series The Blacklist, and for her recurring role as Judge Rebecca Steinman in Law & Order, Law & Order: Special Victims Unit, and Law & Order: Trial by Jury. She has portrayed judges in a number of legal dramas, including Judge Rudy Fox in The Practice, Judge Barbara Burke in Family Law, and Judge Hanlon in Bull.

== Filmography ==
=== Films ===
Year	Title	Role	Ref.
1987	Forever, Lulu	Jackie Coles	
1988	Crossing Delancey	Leslie	
1989	Pet Sematary	Missy Dandridge	
1990	Love or Money	Midge Reed	
1990	The Ambulance	Hospital Receptionist	
1990	Edward Scissorhands	Tinka	
1992	Stay Tuned	Ducker	
1993	For Love or Money	Charlotte	
1994	Guarding Tess	Kimberly Cannon	
1995	The Jerky Boys	Sister Mary	
1997	MouseHunt	Ms. Park Avenue	
1999	Henry Hill	Gertrude Cox Hill	
2000	Down to You	Psychologist	
2000	Clowns	Frances	
2002	Personal Velocity: Three Portraits	Mrs. Toron	
2002	The Empath		
2004	King of the Corner	Gloria	
2004	Kinsey	Staff Secretary	
2006	United 93	Jane Folger	
2006	Love Comes to the Executioner	Nancy Novacelik	
2008	The Loss of a Teardrop Diamond	Addie's Nurse	
2008	Doubt	Mrs. Carson	
2009	Confessions of a Shopaholic	Charity Store Orla	
2009	Happy Tears	Mallory	
2009	The Good Heart	Nurse Nora	
2010	It's Kind of a Funny Story	HS Teacher	
2013	Inside Llewyn Davis	Nurse	
2013	The Double	Liz	
2014	A Good Marriage	Waitress	
2015	Fan Girl	Mrs. Smith	
2017	Unearthed & Untold: The Path to Pet Sematary	Herself	
2019	John Wick: Chapter 3 – Parabellum	The Librarian	
2019	The Kitchen	Mrs. Sullivan	
2026	The Debut	Sybil	

=== Television ===
Year	Title	Role	Notes	Ref.
1990	Tales from the Crypt	Luisa	Episode: "Four-Sided Triangle"	
1991	Murphy Brown		Episode: "On Another Plane: Part 2"	
1991–2004	Law & Order	Judge Rebecca Steinman	8 episodes	
1992	Terror on Track 9	Umbrella	TV film	
1993	L.A. Law	Dr. Janice Scheinbaum	Episode: "Odor in the Court"	
1993–1994	Mad About You	Miss Grundy / Rita, The Cabby	2 episodes	
1994	Grace Under Fire	Katherine Fleiss	2 episodes	
1994	Diagnosis: Murder	Hannah	Episode: "You Can Call Me Johnson"	
1995	The X-Files	Phyllis H. Paddock	Episode: "Die Hand Die Verletzt"	
1996	New York Undercover		Episode: "Fire Show"	
1997	Fame L.A.	Bobbie Bendetti	Episode: "Seize the Day"	
1997	Murder, She Wrote: South by Southwest	Dottie	TV film	
1998	The Drew Carey Show	Judge Oberman	Episode: "The Sex Drug"	
1998–2000	The Brian Benben Show	Beverly Shippel	5 episodes	
1998–2003	The Practice	Judge Rudy Fox	9 episodes	
1999	Ally McBeal	Judge Fox	Episode: "Only the Lonely"	
2000	ER	Sarah McKenzie	Episode: "The Fastest Year"	
2000–2002	Family Law	Judge Barbara Burke	4 episodes	
2001	Angel	Vakma	Episode: "Over the Rainbow"	
2002	The Division	Dana Joyce	Episode: "Long Day's Journey"	
2003	The Guardian	Abbey	Episode: "Let God Sort 'Em Out"	
2004	Law & Order: Special Victims Unit	Judge Rebecca Steinman	Episode: "Ritual"	
2005	Law & Order: Trial by Jury	Judge Rebecca Steinman	Episode: "Vigilante"	
2006	The Sopranos	Betty Wolf	2 episodes	
2007	Guiding Light	Gloria	Episode: "Find Your Light"	
2009	The Good Wife	Ruth	Episode: "Crash"	
2009	Flight of the Conchords	Tour Guide	Episode: "Prime Minister"	
2010	Boardwalk Empire	Irene Davis	Episode: "Nights in Ballygran"	
2011	The Big C	Daisy	Episode: "Crossing the Line"	
2013–2021	The Blacklist	"Mr. Kaplan" / Kathryn Nemec	28 episodes	
2014	Mozart in the Jungle	Karla	Episode: "You Go to My Head"	
2014–2015	Louie	Nurse	2 episodes	
2016	Madoff	Vera Zweig	Miniseries	
2016	Elementary	Dr. Xanthopoulos	Episode: "It Serves You Right to Suffer"	
2017–2018	Bull	Judge Hanlon	2 episodes	
2018	One Dollar		Episode: "Cooper Shaw"	
2020	Blue Bloods	Polly Riley	Episode: "The Puzzle Palace"	
2022	Partner Track	Roberta	6 episodes	
2022	New Amsterdam	"Toots" Cannon	Episode: "Grabby Hands"	
2023	Dead Ringers	Agnes	2 episodes	

=== Video games ===
Year	Title	Role	Notes	Ref.
2006	Bully	Mrs. McRae	Voice	
