= Pet Sematary (2019 film) =

2019 film by Kevin Kölsch and Dennis Widmyer

- Theatrical release poster
- Directed by: Kevin Kölsch; Dennis Widmyer
- Screenplay by: Jeff Buhler
- Story by: Matt Greenberg
- Based on: Pet Sematary by Stephen King
- Produced by: Lorenzo di Bonaventura; Mark Vahradian; Steven Schneider
- Starring: Jason Clarke; Amy Seimetz; John Lithgow
- Cinematography: Laurie Rose
- Edited by: Sarah Broshar
- Music by: Christopher Young
- Production companies: Di Bonaventura Pictures; Room 101, Inc.
- Distributed by: Paramount Pictures
- Release dates: March 16, 2019 (SXSW); April 5, 2019 (United States)
- Running time: 101 minutes
- Country: United States
- Language: English
- Budget: $21 million
- Box office: $113 million

Pet Sematary is a 2019 American supernatural horror film directed by Kevin Kölsch and Dennis Widmyer from a screenplay by Jeff Buhler, based on the 1983 novel of the same name by Stephen King. It is the second film adaptation of the novel, following the 1989 film. It is the third installment in the Pet Sematary film series. The film stars Jason Clarke, Amy Seimetz and John Lithgow, and follows the Creed family, who discover a mysterious graveyard in the woods behind their new home capable of resurrecting the dead.

Talks for a new adaptation of Pet Sematary began in March 2010, with Matt Greenberg initially writing the screenplay. Lorenzo di Bonaventura and Steven Schneider were revealed to be producing the film with Juan Carlos Fresnadillo in talks to direct it. By December 2017, Paramount Pictures had greenlit the new film version of King's novel, with duo filmmakers Kölsch and Widmyer directing. Principal photography commenced in June 2018, in Montreal and Hudson, Quebec, Canada, and wrapped in August.

Pet Sematary premiered at South by Southwest on March 16, 2019, and was released in the United States on April 5, by Paramount Pictures. The film grossed over $113 million worldwide against a production budget of $20 million and received mixed reviews from critics.

A prequel, Pet Sematary: Bloodlines, premiered on October 6, 2023, on Paramount+.

== Plot ==
Louis Creed, an ER doctor from Boston, Massachusetts, moves to the small town of Ludlow, Maine with his wife, Rachel, their two young children, Ellie and Gage, and Ellie's pet cat, Church. Exploring the woods, Rachel and Ellie stumble across a funeral procession of children taking a dead dog to a cemetery called "Pet Sematary". At the university hospital, Louis is left shaken after failing to save the life of Victor Pascow, a student who was fatally injured after being struck and dragged by a vehicle. He later experiences a vivid dream in which Victor leads him to the deadfall at the back of the cemetery and warns him not to "venture beyond". Louis awakens to find his feet and sheets caked in mud, suggesting that the events were more than just a nightmare.

On Halloween, Church is killed by a truck. Jud Crandall, their neighbor who has a soft spot for Ellie, takes Louis past the pet cemetery to an ancient burial ground to bury Church. The next day, Louis is stunned when Church returns home alive, though he is different: aggressive and violent, tearing apart a bird and eating it alive. Jud reveals to Louis that the burial ground brings things back from the dead and is believed to be inhabited by a spirit known as the Wendigo. He apologizes, having thought Church would return the same, and says that "sometimes dead is better". After Church attacks Gage, Louis tries to euthanize him but relents and decides to set him free in the wild.

During her birthday party, Ellie spots Church on the road and excitedly rushes to him but is hit and killed by a derailed tanker truck. The family is devastated, and Rachel and Gage leave to spend a few days with Rachel's parents. Sensing that Louis is planning on resurrecting Ellie, Jud warns the grieving father that Ellie would not be the same person as before. Though Victor's spirit similarly warns him, Louis's grief spurs him to carry out his plan. He drugs Jud, exhumes Ellie's corpse, and reburies her in the animal graveyard as the Wendigo looks on. Ellie rises from the dead but manifests a disturbing demeanor.

Meanwhile, Rachel is frightened by visions of her dead sister Zelda, who suffered from spinal meningitis and died after falling down a dumbwaiter shaft. Gage is also frightened by the ghost of Victor who tries to warn him about going home. Jud wakes up and spots Ellie in the house. He flees home in horror to retrieve his revolver, but Jud, distracted by a growling Church, allows Ellie to surprise him on the stairwell where she proceeds to slice through Jud's Achilles tendon with a scalpel while taunting him with the voice of his dead wife before viciously stabbing him to death.

Rachel and Gage return home and encounter the undead Ellie. Rachel is horrified and flees with Gage to an upstairs bedroom. Ellie, enraged at being rejected by her mother, attacks Rachel as Louis finds Jud's blood-soaked body. Rushing home, Louis manages to save Gage just as Ellie fatally stabs Rachel. He locks Gage in the car, and Rachel begs her husband not to bury her in the Pet Sematary. Ellie knocks Louis unconscious and drags her mother's body to the burial ground. At the pet cemetery, Ellie tries to kill Louis. As Louis prepares to decapitate his daughter, he is impaled from behind by a makeshift grave marker, falling and revealing a reanimated Rachel. Ellie and Rachel silently drag Louis away and he is subsequently buried. Rachel, Ellie, Church, and a resurrected Louis set fire to Jud's house before approaching the car. Louis peers into the car at Gage before a beeping sound of the car door unlocking is heard.

== Cast ==
- Jason Clarke as Louis Creed
- Amy Seimetz as Rachel Creed (nee Goldman), Louis' wife and Ellie and Gage's mother
- John Lithgow as Jud Crandall
- Jeté Laurence as Ellie Creed, Louis and Rachel's daughter and Gage's older sister
- Hugo and Lucas Lavoie as Gage Creed, Louis and Rachel's son and Ellie's younger brother
- Obssa Ahmed as Victor Pascow
- Frank Schorpion as Irwin Goldman,Rachel's father,Louis' father-in-law and Ellie and Gage's grandfather
- Linda E. Smith as Dory Goldman,Rachel's mother,Louis' mother-in-law and Ellie and Gage's grandmother

== Production ==
=== Development ===
On March 5, 2010, Paramount Pictures announced that it was developing a new adaptation of Stephen King's novel Pet Sematary, and that Matt Greenberg had been hired to write the screenplay. Geenberg was later credited with the "screen story". By October 2013, Lorenzo di Bonaventura and Steven Schneider were to serve as producers for the production, and Juan Carlos Fresnadillo was in talks to direct.

In August 2017, Andy Muschietti, director of the 2017 film adaptation of Stephen King's It, said that he and his sister, Barbara Muschietti, wanted to adapt Pet Sematary. On October 30, 2017, it was announced that Paramount Pictures had officially greenlit the film, which was expected to be directed by Kevin Kölsch and Dennis Widmyer, from a screenplay by Jeff Buhler and David Kajganich, though the latter went uncredited. Aside from di Bonaventura and Schneider, Mark Vahradian also produced. Other filmmakers considered were Sean Carter and Johannes Roberts.

=== Casting ===
On April 16, 2018, it was announced that Jason Clarke had been cast in the lead role of Louis Creed. On May 4, 2018, it was reported John Lithgow had joined the cast in the role of Jud Crandall. In June 2018, it was announced that Amy Seimetz would have the film's lead female role, Rachel Creed, along with Jeté Laurence as Creed's daughter Ellie and twins Hugo and Lucas Lavoie as Creed's son Gage. In October 2018, it was reported that Obssa Ahmed had been added as college student Victor Pascow, and Alyssa Brooke Levine as Zelda Goldman. Zelda was previously portrayed by stuntman Andrew Hubatsek in the 1989 film.

=== Filming ===
Principal photography commenced on June 18, 2018, in Hudson, Quebec, Canada. Filming wrapped on August 11, 2018.

== Soundtrack ==
Christopher Young composed the film score. The end credits include a cover version of the Ramones song "Pet Sematary" by American punk rock band Starcrawler. Waxwork Records released the soundtrack on a double LP in 2019 following the release of the film.

=== Track list ===
==== Double LP track list ====
1. "The Wendigo"
2. "The Maine Road"
3. "But the Cat Has No Hat"
4. "Underground Terrors"
5. "Fielding Fine"
6. "Scream for More"
7. "Dead Alive Again"
8. "Church Isn't Church"
9. "Un-Hallowed Even"
10. "Fouled Soil"
11. "Echo Angels"
12. "Just Not the Same"
13. "Watching the Dead Do"
14. "Die Daddy Die"
15. "Wasn't the Beginning?"
16. "Pet Sematary" – Starcrawler

== Release ==
The film had its world premiere at South by Southwest on March 16, 2019, and was theatrically released in the United States on April 5, 2019, by Paramount Pictures. The film was going to be released on April 19, 2019, but was moved two weeks from its original release date of April 19, 2019, to April 5, 2019. The film grossed $6.9 million in home sales.

== Reception ==
=== Box office ===
Pet Sematary grossed $54.7 million in the United States and Canada, and $58.3 million in other territories, for a worldwide total of $113.1 million, against a production budget of $21 million. In the United States and Canada, Pet Sematary was released alongside Shazam! and The Best of Enemies, and was projected to gross $20–30 million from 2,500 theaters in its opening weekend. It made $2.3 million from Thursday night previews. It then grossed $10 million on its first day, including previews. It went on to debut to $24.5 million, finishing second, behind Shazam!. The film fell 60% in its second weekend to $9.7 million, finishing fourth, and then made $4.9 million in its third weekend, finishing seventh.

=== Critical response ===
On review aggregator Rotten Tomatoes, the film holds an approval rating of 57% based on 276 reviews, with an average rating of 5.9/10. The website's critical consensus reads: "Pet Sematary takes its source material in a few different directions, but this remake feels like an exhuming almost as often as it does a revival." On Metacritic, the film has a weighted average score of 57 out of 100, based on 42 critics, indicating "mixed or average reviews". Audiences polled by CinemaScore gave the film an average grade of "C+" on an A+ to F scale, while those at PostTrak gave it an overall positive score of 66% and a 47% "definite recommend".

== Prequel ==
In March 2019, di Bonaventura stated that discussions of the development of a prequel had begun. Buhler reaffirmed this, stating that a continuation would explore "digging into the mythology of the town, these rituals that children present, the mythology of the Miꞌkmaq, the Wendigo, the cemetery, the origins, Jud's life." In February 2021, the film was officially green-lit with Buhler and di Bonaventura returning in their roles as screenwriter and producer, respectively. The prequel, titled Pet Sematary: Bloodlines, premiered at Fantastic Fest on September 23, 2023, and was released via streaming exclusively on Paramount+ on October 6, 2023.
