= Magic Rock (film) =

2001 film by Bradley Gallo

- Directed by: Bradley Gallo; Aditya Chandora
- Written by: Bradley Gallo
- Produced by: Bradley Gallo
- Starring: Bradley Gallo; Adam Busch; Miko Hughes; Joanna Wasick
- Cinematography: Matthew MacCarthy
- Edited by: Dave Hagen
- Music by: Dave Hagen; Mikey Wax
- Production companies: Magic Rock; Reel Life Productions
- Distributed by: Porchlight Entertainment (2002); Questar Home Video (2005)
- Release date: July 18, 2001 (Stony Brook, New York)
- Running time: 94 minutes
- Country: United States
- Language: English

Magic Rock is a 2001 comedy-drama film written by Bradley Gallo and directed by Bradley Gallo and Aditya Chandora.

== Background ==
Gallo wrote the film's screenplay while a psychology student at Pennsylvania State University. Gallo based parts of the Magic Rock on his own 15 Summers spent at Camp Cody For Boys in Freedom, New Hampshire when a boy, and filmed the project on locations in Lake Ossipee, New Hampshire. Prior to its screening at the Stony Brook Film Festival on July 18, 2001, The New York Times wrote that "The idea for Magic Rock was inspired by Mr. Gallo's own experiences at sleep-away camp. The fictitious Camp Kobie was based on Camp Cody, on the shores of Ossipee Lake in New Hampshire, where Mr. Gallo spent 12 summers."

The film won the 'Best Cinematography Award' at the 2001 Angel Citi Film Festival in Los Angeles.

== Plot ==
When a beloved Summer Camp director dies, the popular boys' haven will be closed by the heartless attorney who inherits it unless a dedicated young camp counselor can change his mind over one last summer, with the comic help of his oddball campers.

== Partial cast ==
- Bradley Gallo as T.J.
- Adam Busch as Kyle
- Miko Hughes as Jesse
- Tom Delaney as Bud
- Erik Parillo as Richard
- Kimberly Jay Thomas as Eve
- Edward Winrow as Bob Rosenberg
- Eli Gelb as Mookie
- Jimmy McQuaid as Cody
- Ross Gallo as Blake
- Daryl Wein as Tanner
- Thomas Magnani as Zach

== Recognition ==
=== Awards & nomination ===
- 'Best Cinematography' - 2001 Angel Citi Film Festival
