= Starcrawler =

American rock band

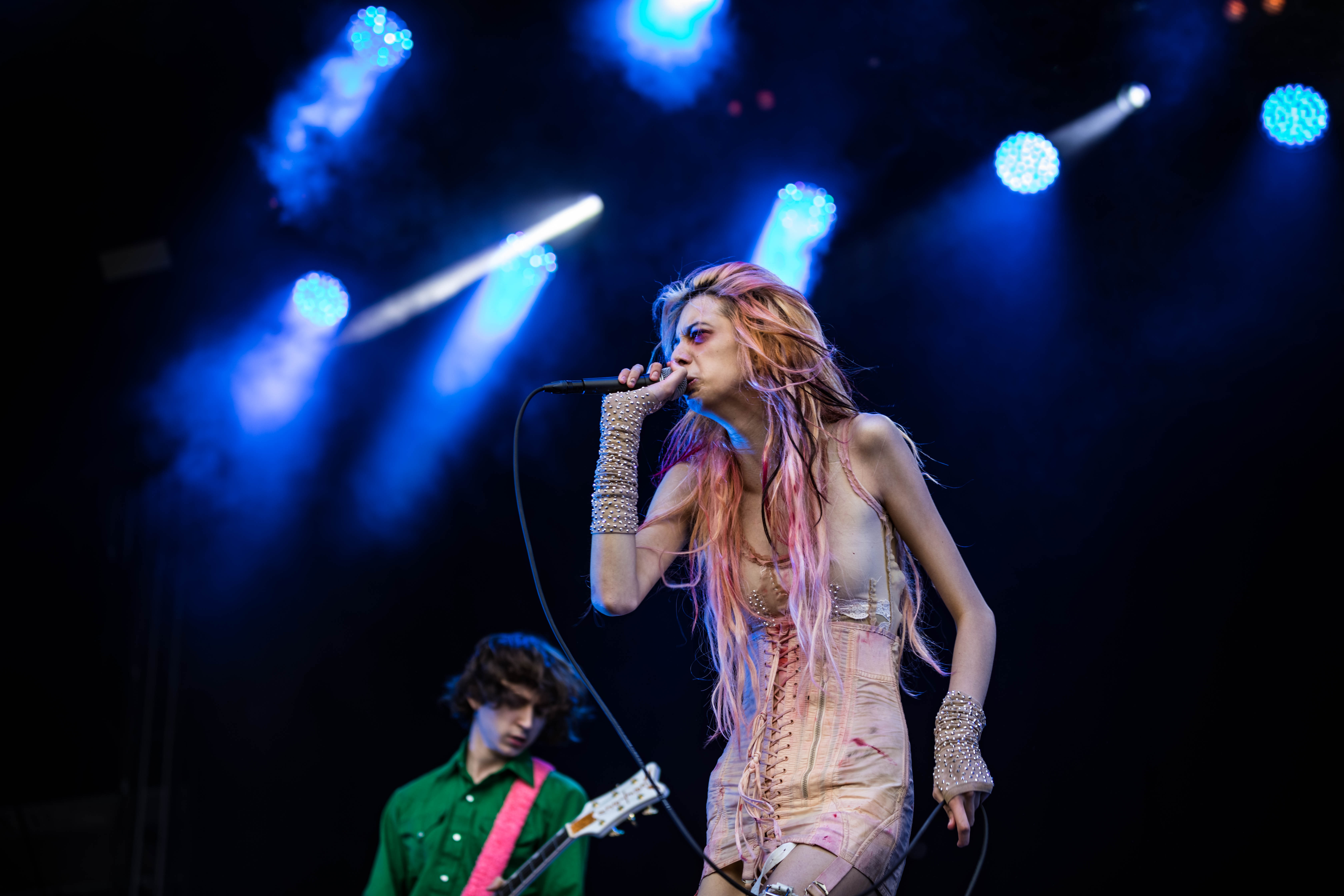
- Henri Cash and Arrow de Wilde performing with Starcrawler at Rock am Ring, 2018.

Background information
- Origin: Los Angeles, California, U.S.
- Genres: Glam rock, pop punk, rock and roll
- Years active: 2015–present
- Labels: Rough Trade, Big Machine
- Members: Arrow de Wilde; Henri Cash; Tim Franco; Seth Carolina; Bill Cash
- Past members: Austin Smith
- Website: starcrawlermusic.com

Starcrawler is an American rock band from Los Angeles, formed in 2015. The band consists of lead singer Arrow de Wilde, guitarist Henri Cash, bassist Tim Franco, drummer Seth Carolina, and pedal steel/guitar player Bill Cash. They have released three studio albums: Starcrawler (2018), Devour You (2019) and She Said (2022).

Their fourth album, Kick Me, is expected on march 26, 2027.

Starcrawler lead singer Arrow de Wilde and guitarist Henri Cash both attended Los Angeles' Grand Arts High School. De Wilde is the child of photographer Autumn de Wilde and drummer Aaron Sperske.

== History ==
=== Origins ===
In the summer of 2015, Arrow de Wilde and Austin Smith came together to collaborate in making music. When the school year began in 2015/2016, the two decided to recruit new members, a guitarist and bassist. One day during school Wilde saw Henri Cash and asked, "You look cool, do you play guitar?" Cash was carrying a tuba at the time. Wilde later recruited bassist Tim Franco. In an interview with FY Magazine when asked about the origins of the name Starcrawler, drummer Austin Smith said, "It’s something I just came up with, random word association." Arrow added, "We got our first show booked and didn't have a name."

=== 2017–2018: Early period and debut album ===
Starcrawler's debut 7", "Ants" / "Used To Know", was released in 2017 on red/white splatter vinyl with a picture sleeve in a limited edition of 500 copies, which sold out quickly. Starcrawler released their first 7" single from their debut album, "I Love LA" / "Castaway", on Rough Trade Records on February 16, 2018. The single features a photo of the band on the front and back labels, and comes in a pink sleeve.

In March 2018, Starcrawler performed a number of shows at the world's biggest music showcase, South By Southwest (SXSW), in Austin, Texas. Their performances gained notoriety for their energy and antics. During their final gig at SXSW, lead singer de Wilde terrorized the crowd by spitting blood in the face of a photographer, hurling attendees' personal possessions into the crowd, and firing a snot rocket into the face of another audience member. Starcrawler won the Grulke Prize for Developing U.S. Act at SXSW for their performances at the festival.

Starcrawler performed their singles "Love's Gone Again" and "I Love LA" live on Later With Jools Holland on May 29, 2018, before the start of their 2018 European Tour. The tour ran from May 30 to June 23 and included concerts in Spain, Luxembourg, Germany, Portugal, the United Kingdom, Austria, France and the Netherlands.

The band's self-titled debut album Starcrawler was released that year by Rough Trade Records on both white and black vinyl. 200 copies were also pressed on white vinyl with an alternate cover.

=== 2018–2020: Devour You ===
Starcrawler released the single "Hollywood Ending" along "Tank Top" as a B-side on November 16, 2018.

On February 26, 2019, Starcrawler released the second single "She Gets Around" that recalls '90s alternative rock bands like Nirvana and The Breeders with heavy power chords and Arrow's vocal performance who snarls the tune's dark lyrics in between growls and howls.

The band contributed a cover of the Ramones song with the same title to the soundtrack of the film Pet Sematary, which was digitally released on April 5, 2019.

On October 11, the band released their second studio album Devour You.

=== 2020–present: She Said ===
On August 2, 2020, de Wilde stated in an Instagram post that she was sexually assaulted in a dressing room by a male stripper in January on a tour stop with The Growlers in Melbourne, Australia. She said her bandmates were locked out of the dressing room while the assault took place, and that while none of the members of The Growlers directly participated in the assault, they laughed and filmed the incident, in which she repeatedly attempted to leave but was held down. Starcrawler guitarist Henri Cash later made a statement backing up de Wilde's claims, stating that the band had tried to enter the room to no avail. Brooks Nielsen, lead singer of The Growlers, who was said to have orchestrated the incident, issued an apology on Instagram and stated that guitarist Matt Taylor had taken temporary leave despite denying the allegations.

On October 8, Austin Smith announced his departure from the band on Instagram, citing his need for time to "[find] the joy of life with family and friends" and for a "much needed break". The band later confirmed Austin's departure, stating he was "no longer playing in Starcrawler", and that they "wish him well in the future."

Starcrawler released their third album, She Said, on September 16, 2022, via Big Machine Records.

== Critical reception ==
In a review in The Guardian the band was described as "Blending the sludgy, doom-laden riffs of Black Sabbath with the urgent pop-punk of The Runaways, the young LA band Starcrawler are a group whose entire DNA seems linked to the 1970s."

== Band members ==
Current members

- Arrow de Wilde - vocals (2015–present)
- Henri Cash - lead guitar (2015–present)
- Tim Franco - bass (2016–present)
- Seth Carolina - drums (2020–present)
- Bill Cash - pedal steel/rhythm guitar (2020–present)

Former members

- Austin Smith - drums (2015 - 2020)

== Discography ==
=== Studio albums ===
- Starcrawler (2018)
- Devour You (2019)
- She Said (2022)
- Kick Me (2027)

=== Extended plays ===
- Acoustic Sessions (2023)

=== Singles ===
- "Ants" / "Used to Know" (2017)
- "Let Her Be" (2017)
- "I Love LA" / "Castaway" (2018)
- "Love's Gone Again" (2018)
- "Chicken Woman" (2018)
- "Hollywood Ending" / "Tank Top" (2018)
- "She Gets Around" (2019)
- "Pet Sematary" (2019)
- "Bet My Brains" (2019)
- "No More Pennies" (2019)
- "Lizzy" / "Bet My Brains" (2020) - Live At Third Man
- "I Need To Know" ft. Mike Campbell (2020)
- "Roadkill" (2022)
- "She Said" (2022)
- "Stranded" (2022)
- "Broken Angels" (2022)
- "Stranded (Acoustic)" (2022)
- "Learn to Say Goodbye" (2024)
- "Baby Let's Play House" / "Blue Moon" (2026) - Record Store Day Limited Edition
- "On 2 U" (2026)
- "Kick Me" (2026)
- "Bedroom Is Haunted" (2026)

=== Music videos ===
List of music videos, showing year released and director
Title	Year	Album	Director(s)
"Ants"	2017	—N/a	Chris Blauvelt & Autumn de Wilde
"Let Her Be"	2017	Starcrawler	J. Casey Modderno
"I Love LA"	2017	Starcrawler	Autumn de Wilde
"Love's Gone Again"	2018	Starcrawler	Autumn de Wilde
"Chicken Woman"	2018	Starcrawler	Gilbert Trejo
"Hollywood Ending"	2019	Devour You	Gilbert Trejo
"She Gets Around"	2019	Devour You	Gilbert Trejo
"Bet My Brains"	2019	Devour You	Jellyclaw
"No More Pennies"	2019	Devour You	Arrow de Wilde & Jonathan King
"I Need to Know" (ft. Mike Campbell)	2020	—N/a	Gilbert Trejo
"Goodtime Girl"	2021	Dark Nights: Death Metal Soundtrack	Gilbert Trejo
"Roadkill"	2022	She Said	Gilbert Trejo
"She Said"	2022	She Said	Gilbert Trejo
"Stranded"	2022	She Said	Gilbert Trejo
"Learn to Say Goodbye"	2024	—N/a	Gilbert Trejo
"On 2 U"	2026	—N/a	Chris Blauvelt
"Kick Me"	2026	Kick Me	Arrow de Wilde
"Bedroom Is Haunted"	2026	Kick Me	Arrow de Wilde

=== Miscellaneous musical appearances and collaborations ===
- Contributed the song "Ants" to Rough Trade Shops: Counter Culture 17 (2017).
- Contributed the song "Pet Sematary" to Pet Sematary Soundtrack (2019).
- Contributed the song "Let Her Be (live)" to City / Valley : a Live Recording of the Brekfest Festival (2019).
- Featured on the track "Turn Over The World" on Perry Farrell's The Glitz; The Glamour Boxset (2021).
- Contributed the song "Goodtime Girl" to Dark Nights: Death Metal Soundtrack (2021).
- Contributed the song "If You're Gonna Be Dumb, You Gotta Be Tough" to Jackass 4.5 (2022).

== Filmography ==
=== Documentary ===
- City / Valley : A Concert Film of The Brekfest Festival (2019)
- What Drives Us (2021)
