= She Said (album) =

Studio album by Starcrawler
- Released: September 16, 2022
- Studio: Sunset Sound
- Genres: Rock, alternative rock
- Label: Big Machine
- Producer: Tyler Bates

Starcrawler chronology
Devour You (2019)	She Said (2022)	Kick Me (2027)

Singles from She Said
- 1. "Road Kill" Released: May 9, 2022; 2. "She Said" Released: June 17, 2022; 3. "Stranded" Released: July 22, 2022; 4. "Broken Angels" Released: September 2, 2022

She Said is the third studio album by American rock band Starcrawler. It was released on September 16, 2022, by Big Machine Records and produced by Tyler Bates.

== Musical style and composition ==
She Said was seen as a departure from the punk roots of Starcrawler's previous records with critics calling the album a "back-and-forth" between faster rock songs and soft country influenced tunes utilizing pedal steel guitars and banjos. Guitarist and founding member Henri Cash has stated that the band wanted to move away from writing punk songs exclusively.

== Critical reception ==
Professional ratings
Aggregate scores
Source	Rating
Metacritic	69/100
Review scores
Source	Rating
Classic Rock	3/5 stars
DIY	3/5 stars
The Line of Best Fit	6/10
Wall of Sound AU	8.5/10

She Said received generally favorable reviews upon release. At Metacritic, which assigns a normalized rating out of 100 to reviews from mainstream publications, the album received an average score of 69, based on 5 reviews.

== Track listing ==
No.	Title	Writer(s)	Length
1.	"Roadkill"	Arrow De Wilde, Henri Cash, Tim Franco
2.	"She Said"	De Wilde, Henri Cash, Franco
3.	"Stranded"	Cash
4.	"Thursday"	De Wilde, Henri Cash, Franco
5.	"Broken Angels"	De Wilde, Henri Cash, Franco
6.	"Jet Black"	De Wilde, Bill Cash, Henri Cash, Franco, Seth Carolina
7.	"True"	De Wilde, Henri Cash, Franco
8.	"Midnight"	De Wilde, Bill Cash, Henri Cash, Franco, Carolina
9.	"Runaway"	De Wilde, Henri Cash, Franco
10.	"Better Place"	Henri Cash

== Charts ==
Chart performance for She Said
Chart (2022)	Peak position
Scottish Albums (Official Charts)	60
UK Rock & Metal Albums (Official Charts)	6
