= Kevin Kölsch and Dennis Widmyer =

American film directors

Kevin Kölsch and Dennis Widmyer are an American filmmaking duo.

== Filmography ==
Documentary film

| Year | Title | Director | Executive Producer | Editor | DoP | Note |
|---|---|---|---|---|---|---|
| 2003 | Postcards from the Future: The Chuck Palahniuk Documentary | Yes | Yes | Yes | Yes | Co-directed with Joshua Chaplinsky |

Short film

| Year | Title | Director | Writer | Producer | Editor | Notes |
|---|---|---|---|---|---|---|
| 2008 | Throwaway | Widmyer | Widmyer | No | No | |
| 2009 | Identical Dead Sisters | Yes | Yes | Widmyer | No | |
| 2010 | Ext. Life | Kölsch | Kölsch | Yes | Kölsch | |
| 2016 | Valentine's Day | Yes | Yes | Yes | Yes | Segment in Holidays |
| 2016 | New Year's Eve | No | Yes | No | No | Segment in Holidays |

Feature film

| Year | Title | Director | Writer | Producer | Editor |
|---|---|---|---|---|---|
| 2009 | Absence | Yes | Yes | Executive | No |
| 2014 | Starry Eyes | Yes | Yes | No | Widmyer |
| 2019 | Pet Sematary | Yes | No | No | No |
| 2026 | The Swallow | Yes | Yes | Yes | No |

Television

| Year | Title | Director | Note |
|---|---|---|---|
| 2016-2019 | Scream (TV series) | Yes | 3 episodes |
