= Ludlow, Maine =

Town in Maine, United States

- Town
- Location of Ludlow, Maine
- Coordinates: 46°09′50″N 68°00′16″W
- Country: United States
- State: Maine
- County: Aroostook

Area
  - Total: 22.02 sq mi (57.03 km^{2})
  - Land: 22.01 sq mi (57.01 km^{2})
  - Water: 0.012 sq mi (0.03 km^{2})
- Elevation: 781 ft (238 m)

Population (2020)
  - Total: 434
  - Density: 20/sq mi (7.6/km^{2})
- Time zone: UTC-5 (Eastern (EST))
  - Summer (DST): UTC-4 (EDT)
- ZIP Code: 04730
- Area code: 207
- FIPS code: 23-41715
- GNIS feature ID: 582571

Ludlow is a town in Aroostook County, Maine, United States. The population was 434 at the 2020 census.

== Geography ==
According to the United States Census Bureau, the town has a total area of 22.02 square miles (57.03 km^{2}), of which 22.01 square miles (57.01 km^{2}) is land and 0.01 square miles (0.03 km^{2}) is water. The northernmost point on Interstate 95 is just before the southbound Exit 291 within the town (the point is roughly fourteen miles from the highway's "northern" terminus).

== Demographics ==
Historical population
Census	Pop.	Note	%±
1860	287		—
1870	371		29.3%
1880	468		26.1%
1890	375		−19.9%
1900	394		5.1%
1910	412		4.6%
1920	375		−9.0%
1930	361		−3.7%
1940	343		−5.0%
1950	361		5.2%
1960	274		−24.1%
1970	259		−5.5%
1980	403		55.6%
1990	430		6.7%
2000	402		−6.5%
2010	404		0.5%
2020	434		7.4%
U.S. Decennial Census

=== 2010 census ===
As of the census of 2010, there were 404 people, 177 households, and 118 families living in the town. The population density was 18.4 inhabitants per square mile (7.1/km^{2}). There were 224 housing units at an average density of 10.2 per square mile (3.9/km^{2}). The racial makeup of the town was 94.8% White, 0.2% African American, 4.2% Native American, 0.5% Asian, and 0.2% from two or more races. Hispanic or Latino of any race were 0.2% of the population.

There were 177 households, of which 23.2% had children under the age of 18 living with them, 53.7% were married couples living together, 10.2% had a female householder with no husband present, 2.8% had a male householder with no wife present, and 33.3% were non-families. 23.7% of all households were made up of individuals, and 9.6% had someone living alone who was 65 years of age or older. The average household size was 2.28 and the average family size was 2.69.

The median age in the town was 47.5 years. 19.8% of residents were under the age of 18; 5.3% were between the ages of 18 and 24; 20.1% were from 25 to 44; 36.2% were from 45 to 64; and 18.8% were 65 years of age or older. The gender makeup of the town was 50.2% male and 49.8% female.

=== 2000 census ===
As of the census of 2000, there were 402 people, 150 households, and 118 families living in the town. The population density was 18.3 inhabitants per square mile (7.1/km^{2}). There were 203 housing units at an average density of 9.2 per square mile (3.6/km^{2}). The racial makeup of the town was 98.01% White, 0.75% Native American, and 1.24% from two or more races. Hispanic or Latino of any race were 0.75% of the population.

There were 150 households, out of which 34.7% had children under the age of 18 living with them, 64.0% were married couples living together, 10.7% had a female householder with no husband present, and 20.7% were non-families. 14.7% of all households were made up of individuals, and 8.0% had someone living alone who was 65 years of age or older. The average household size was 2.68 and the average family size was 2.94.

In the town, the population was spread out, with 23.9% under the age of 18, 5.0% from 18 to 24, 30.6% from 25 to 44, 27.4% from 45 to 64, and 13.2% who were 65 years of age or older. The median age was 40 years. For every 100 females, there were 104.1 males. For every 100 females age 18 and over, there were 100.0 males.

The median income for a household in the town was $23,594, and the median income for a family was $25,750. Males had a median income of $21,625 versus $17,708 for females. The per capita income for the town was $12,130. About 21.0% of families and 21.9% of the population were below the poverty line, including 36.0% of those under age 18 and 8.9% of those age 65 or over.

== In popular culture ==
- Ludlow, Maine is also the setting of the novels Pet Sematary and The Dark Half by Stephen King. This fictional town is based on Orrington, Maine near the cities of Derry and Castle Rock and is across the Penobscot River from the cities of Bangor and Orono.
- The same Ludlow appears in the film adaptation of Pet Sematary, its sequel Pet Sematary Two, the 2019 remake of the first film, and its prequel Pet Sematary: Bloodlines.
