= Sharon Oreck =

American film producer

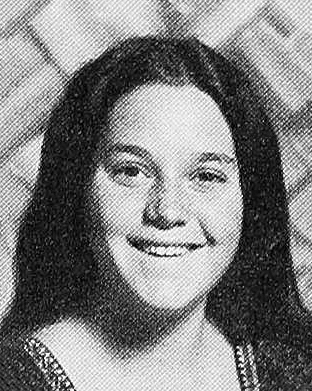
- High school yearbook portrait, 1972
- Born: April 10, 1955 (age 71); Los Angeles, California
- Occupation: Film producer
- Years active: 1972–present
- Spouse: Bill Pope
- Children: 2

Sharon Oreck is an American film, music video and commercial producer. She has Oscar and Grammy nominations in addition to other awards. She is credited with coining the term populence. Oreck has been married to cinematographer Bill Pope since the 1980s. She was a cinema student at Los Angeles City College in Los Angeles.

== Career as a producer ==
Oreck began her production career in 1972, working on low budget genre movies, until she line produced the evacuation of Phnom Penh for The Killing Fields. From 1984 until 2000, she was the owner-operator of O Pictures, which produced many music videos, commercials, short films and documentaries.

Since 1984, she has produced over 600 music videos for performers in different genres including Tony Bennett, Rosanne Cash, Eurythmics, Ice-T, Michael Jackson, Janet Jackson, Mick Jagger, Madonna, Metallica, Bette Midler, Sting and U2.

Oreck is the producer of the 2007 film 14 Women, a documentary that tells the story of 14 women in the United States Senate. The film premiered at the Silverdocs festival in June 2007.

She has written the memoir Video Slut: How I Shoved Madonna Off an Olympic High Dive, Got Prince into a Pair of Tiny Purple Woolen Underpants, Ran Away from Michael Jackson's Dad, and Got a Waterfall to Flow Backward So I Could Bring Rock Videos to the Masses which was published by Faber and Faber in May 2010.

== Filmography ==
- 14 Women – ( Producer / 2007 / Released / )
- Skipped Parts – ( Producer / 2001 / Released / )
- Mugshot – ( Producer / 1996 / Released / )
- Below the Belt – ( Production Assistant / 1980 / Released / Atlantic Releasing Corporation )

== TV credits ==
- Coca-Cola Pop Music "Backstage Pass to Summer" ( 1991 / Released ): Segment Producer
- Imagining America ( 1989 / Released ): Producer

== Selected music videos ==
Year	Title	Artist
1984	"When Doves Cry"	Prince
1984	"The Glamorous Life"	Sheila E.
1984	"Like a Virgin"	Madonna
1985	"Material Girl"	Madonna
1985	"Would I Lie to You?"	Eurythmics
1985	"Sister Fate"	Sheila E.
1986	"Nasty"	Janet Jackson
1986	"Papa Don't Preach"	Madonna
1986	"Open Your Heart"	Madonna
1986	"Control"	Janet Jackson
1987	"Be Still My Beating Heart"	Sting
1987	"La Isla Bonita"	Madonna
1987	"We'll Be Together"	Sting
1987	"Luka"	Suzanne Vega
1988	"In Your Room"	The Bangles
1989	"One"	Metallica
1989	"Like a Prayer"	Madonna
1989	"Cherish"	Madonna
1989	"Opposites Attract"	Paula Abdul
1990	"Without You"	Mötley Crüe
1990	"Don't Go Away Mad (Just Go Away)"	Mötley Crüe
1990	"Love Will Never Do (Without You)"	Janet Jackson
1991	"Wicked Game"	Chris Isaak
1992	"In the Closet"	Michael Jackson
1992	"Who's Gonna Ride Your Wild Horses"	U2

== Awards and honors ==
Sharon Oreck was nominated for an Academy Award in 1985 and a Grammy Award in 1991. She has won two Women in Film Awards (1989 and 1991) and twenty MTV Video Music Awards.

She is credited with coining the term populence, which refers to the way contemporary artists bring together populism and opulence in abstract painting.
