= Unearthed & Untold: The Path to Pet Sematary =

2017 documentary film directed by John Campopiano and Justin White

- Film poster
- Directed by: John Campopiano; Justin White
- Written by: John Campopiano; Justin White
- Produced by: John Campopiano
- Starring: Brad Greenquist; Sean Clark; Susan Blommaert; Denise Crosby; Miko Hughes; Dale Midkiff; Mary Lambert
- Cinematography: Justin White
- Edited by: Brad Geiszler; Justin White
- Music by: Douglas Harper; Kurt Oldman
- Production company: Ocean's Light Productions
- Distributed by: GoDigital; Premiere Digital Services; Synapse Films; Terror Films
- Release date: January 13, 2017
- Running time: 75 minutes
- Country: United States
- Language: English

Unearthed & Untold: The Path to Pet Sematary is a 2017 American documentary film written and directed by John Campopiano and Justin White. The film chronicles the making of Pet Sematary, a 1989 horror film based on Stephen King's eponymous novel.

== Plot ==
Unearthed & Untold shows the making of the 1989 film Pet Sematary. It contains interviews with several cast and crew members who participated, including the main actors, director Mary Lambert and the producers. The film also contains several "behind the stage" scenes.

== Cast ==
- Brad Greenquist as himself
- Sean Clark as himself
- Susan Blommaert as herself
- Denise Crosby as herself
- Miko Hughes as himself
- Dale Midkiff as himself
- Mary Lambert as herself

== Release ==
=== Reception ===
David Andreas from the website Splatter Critic gave it 2^{1/2} out of 4 stars, stating: "Though nothing astounding or ground breaking is ever put forth, this is still an informative look at the creation of a beloved film. Has enough integral players to make up for the inclusion of those whose input isn't required, which helps fuel authenticity." Dave Heath, writing for the website Cryptic Rock gave the film 3^{1/2} out of 5 stars and said: "Ultimately, despite the occasional drags and the lack of King, it remains an interesting insight into how the world got Pet Sematary. Ardent fans of the film are going to get the most out of it, but with nearly everything and the kitchen sink uncovered, newcomers should find enough to keep them intrigued."

The film was nominated for "Best Documentary" at the 2017 Rondo Hatton Classic Horror Awards.
