= Miko Hughes =

American actor

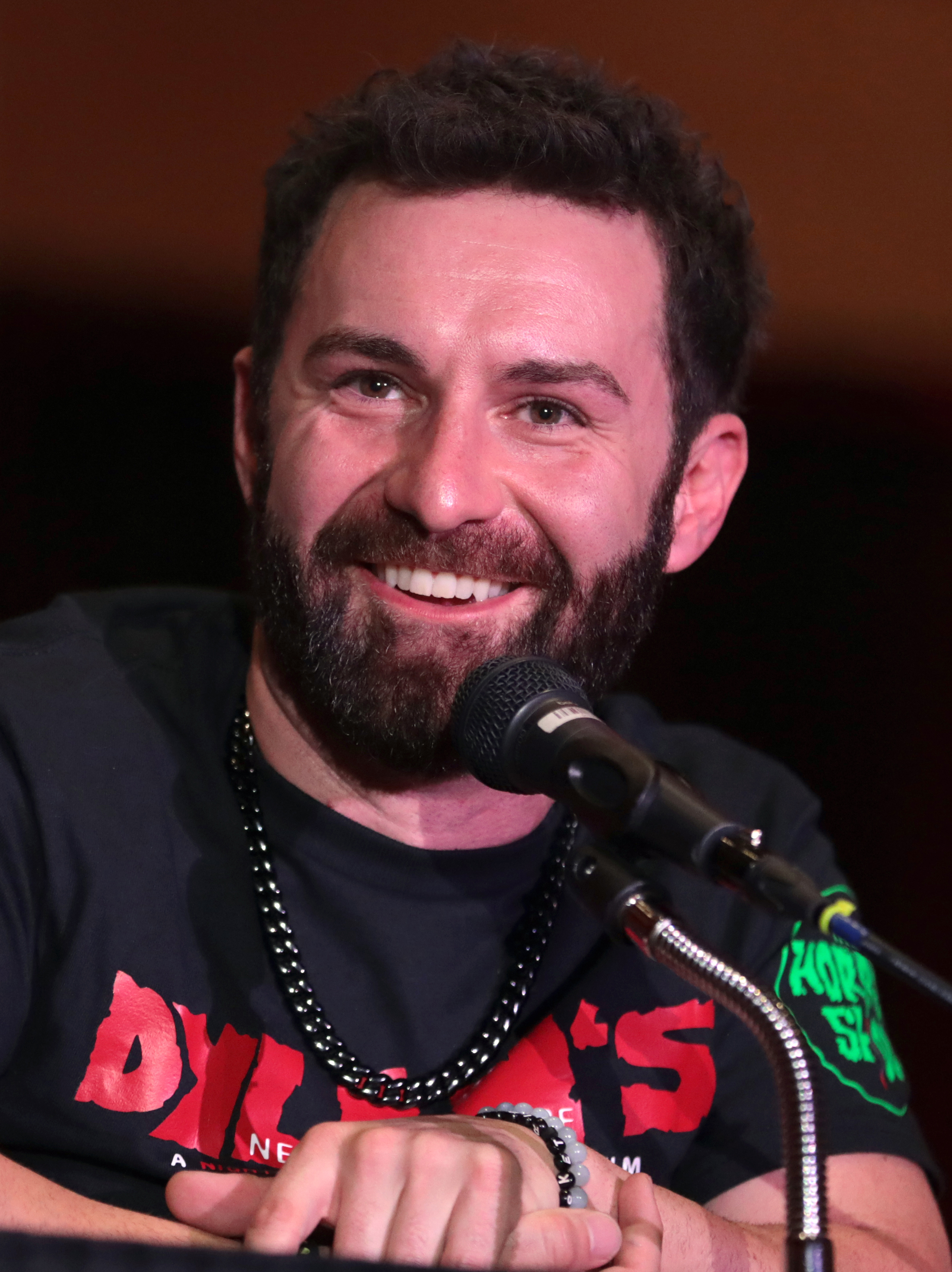
- Hughes in 2023
- Born: Miko John Hughes; February 22, 1986 (age 40); Apple Valley, California, U.S.
- Occupations: Actor, film director, screenwriter
- Years active: 1988–present

Miko John Hughes (born February 22, 1986) is an American actor and filmmaker. He rose to prominence as a child actor in the late 1980s, in film roles such as Gage Creed in Pet Sematary (1989), Kindergarten Cop (1990), Apollo 13 (1995), Spawn (1997), Mercury Rising (1998), and Wes Craven's New Nightmare (1994), as well as his recurring role as Aaron on Full House from 1990 to 1995.

== Early life ==
Hughes was born in Apple Valley, California, the son of Mary (née Phelps) and John Hughes born in Lake Jackson, Texas. He has three older half-siblings. He has English and Chickasaw ancestry.

== Career ==
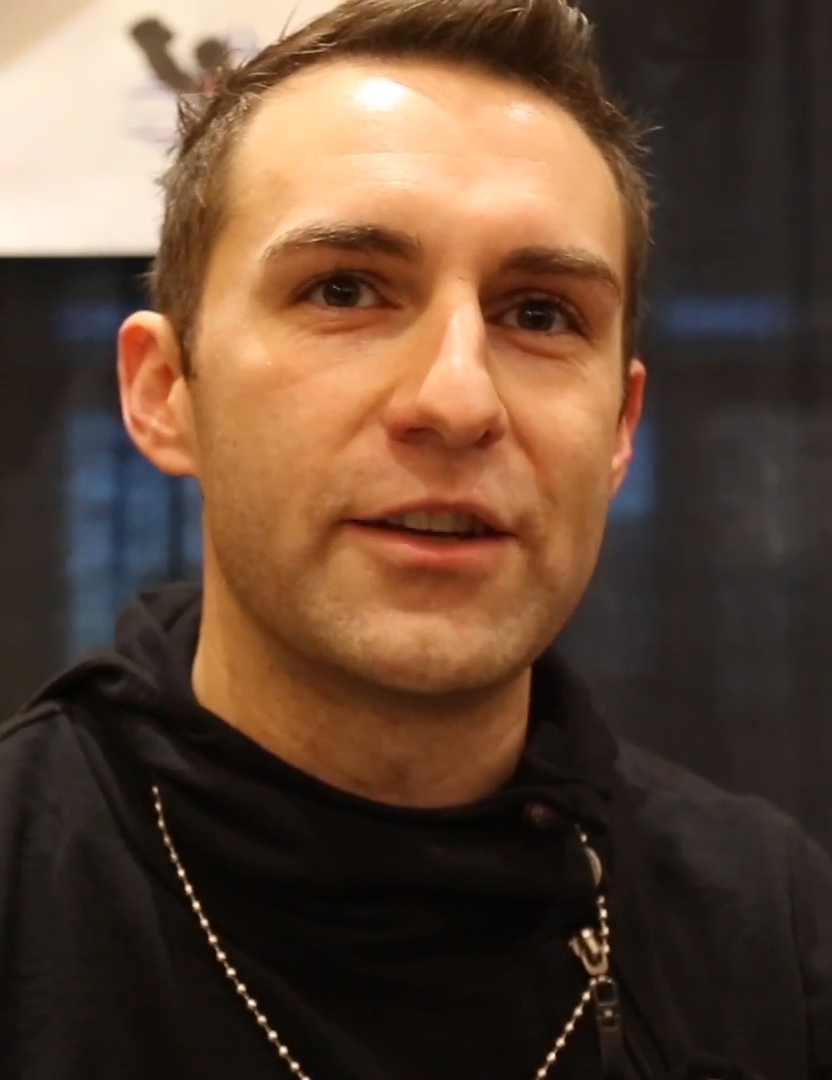
Hughes at the Albuquerque Comic Con in 2018

Hughes started his acting career in a public service announcement when he was 22 months old, and followed that up by appearing in his first feature film five months later. From his years as a child actor, Hughes was consistently one of the busiest young actors in Hollywood. One of his first films was Jack the Bear, opposite Danny DeVito; in addition, he has appeared on film in Pet Sematary (1989), Kindergarten Cop (1990), Wes Craven's New Nightmare (1994), Apollo 13 (1995), Spawn (1997), Zeus and Roxanne (1997) and Mercury Rising (1998).

Hughes has also appeared in numerous television films. He has been a series regular, recurring character or a guest star on several television series. He played Aaron Bailey on Full House from 1990 to 1995. Other appearances have been in Baywatch (1998), Sister Kate (1989–1990), Beverly Hills, 90210 (1991), Melrose Place (1992), Touched by an Angel (1994), and The Nanny (1994). Hughes received an Emmy Award certificate for his participation as the voice of Tommy in the number-one-rated Fox animated television series Life with Louie (1995). His other voice-over credits include twin babies, Sly and Witt, in the feature film Baby Geniuses (1999).

After a break in his career, Hughes re-emerged as a teen in the science-fiction series Roswell. He played a villain who was part of a renegade group of aliens. As a musician, Hughes released two albums in 1995, at the age of nine. One is self-titled and the other is called Halloween Haunts. He wrote songs for both albums. They were recorded and released by his own company, Little Chief Inc. In 2013, Hughes directed the segment "See" in the horror anthology film Chilling Visions: 5 Senses of Fear.

== Filmography ==
=== Film ===
Year	Title	Role	Notes
1989	Pet Sematary	Gage Creed	
1990	Kindergarten Cop	Joseph	
1993	Jack the Bear	Dylan Leary	
1994	Cops & Robbersons	Billy Robberson	
1994	Wes Craven's New Nightmare	Dylan Porter	
1995	Apollo 13	Jeffrey Lovell	
1997	Zeus and Roxanne	Jordan Barnett	
1997	Spawn	Zack	
1998	Mercury Rising	Simon Lynch	
1999	Baby Geniuses	Sly / Whit (voice)	
1999	One Last Flight	Ray	
2001	Magic Rock	Jesse	
2002	Clockstoppers	Young Earl Dopler	
2004	Escape to Grizzly Mountain	Jimmy	
2005	Dogg's Hamlet, Cahoot's Macbeth	Ghost / Gravedigger / Osiric	
2006	Surf School	Taz	
2007	Thou Shalt Not	The Kid	Short
2008	Tropic Thunder	Radio DJ	Uncredited
2011	Steve Niles' Remains	Jensen	
2016	Brody	Brody (voice)	Short
2017	Unearthed & Untold: The Path to Pet Sematary	Himself	Documentary film
2019	The Untold Story	Jeremy	
2023	Dylan's New Nightmare	Dylan Porter	Short
2026	Night of the Living Dead	Ollie	

==== As director/screenwriter ====
Year	Title	Notes
2013	Chilling Visions: 5 Senses of Fear	Segment: "See"

=== Television ===
Year	Title	Role	Notes
1990	Out of This World	Younger Billy	Episode: "Four Men and a Baby"
1990	Unspeakable Acts	Chad Hershel	Film
1990	Sister Kate	Buster	2 episodes
1990	Babes	Billy	Episode: "Rent Strike"
1991	Beverly Hills, 90210	Young Chuckie	Episode: "Chuckie's Back"
1992	Doogie Howser, M.D.	Matthew, Cecilia's Son	Episode: "If This Is Adulthood, I'd Rather Be in Philadelphia"
1992	The Burden of Proof	Sam	Film
1992	A Child Lost Forever: The Jerry Sherwood Story	Robert Jurgens (age 3)	Film
1992	Hangin' with Mr. Cooper	Aaron Bailey	Episode: "Hangin' with Michelle"
1992	Melrose Place	David Patterson	Episode: "Jake vs. Jake"
1993	Shaky Ground	Michael	Episode: "Of Human Bonding"
1993	CBS Schoolbreak Special	Andy Walters	Episode: "Big Boys Don't Cry"
1993	Picket Fences	Elliot Doyle	Episode: "Rights of Passage"
1993	The Town Santa Forgot	Young Jeremy Creek (voice)	Film
1994	Natural Selection	Nick "Nicky" Braden	Film
1994	The Nanny	Frank Bradley Jr.	Episode: "Sunday in the Park with Fran"
1994	Life with Louie: A Christmas Surprise for Mrs. Stillman	Tommy Anderson (voice)	TV short
1990–1995	Full House	Aaron Bailey	13 episodes
1995	Touched by an Angel	Daniel Duncan	Episode: "Sympathy for the Devil"
1995	Trail of Tears	Ethan	Film
1996	The Story of Santa Claus	Clement (voice)	Film
1996	The Parent 'Hood	Arnie	3 episodes
1997	Adventures from the Book of Virtues	Prince Fredolin (voice)	Episode: "Generosity"
1995–1998	Life with Louie	Tommy Anderson (voice)	32 episodes
1998	The Puppies Present Incredible Animal Tales	Bingo	Film
1998	At the End of the Day: The Sue Rodriguez Story	Jesse Rodriguez	Film
1998	Baywatch	Timmy Greyson	Episode: "Dolphin Quest"
1999	Lethal Wows	Graham Farris	Film
2000	Twice in a Lifetime	Max Bogart	Episode: "Curveball"
2000	Roswell	Nicholas Crawford	3 episodes
2002	Hey Arnold!	Alan Redmond (voice)	Episode: "Harold vs. Patty/Rich Guy"
2003	Boston Public	Peter Feldman	3 episodes
2005	Veronica Mars	Stoner Dude #1	Episode: "Driver Ed"
2007	Cavemen	Kyle	Episode: "Nick Get Job"
2014	The New Adventures of Pinkgirl and The Scone	Bastard Steel	Episode: "A Bitch of Bastard"
2025	99 to Beat	Contestant	Eliminated; 31st place

=== Music videos ===
Year	Song	Artist	Role
2021	"Funeral Derangements"	Ice Nine Kills	Truck Driver
