= Camp Cody (summer camp) =

International summer camp in Freedom, New Hampshire, US

Coordinates: 43°48′48″N 71°8′42″W

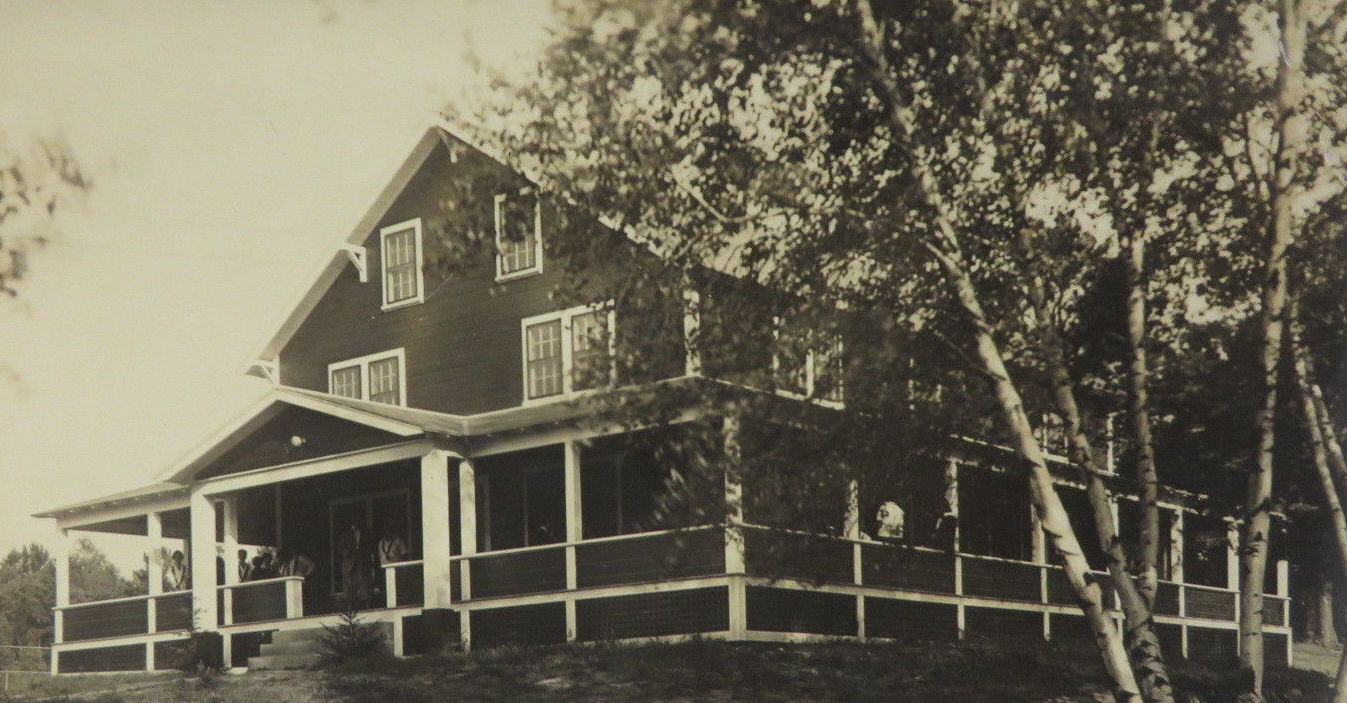
- Camp Cody's administration building (still standing today), early 1920s, when the site was owned by the all girls camp, Camp Adeawonda.
- Interactive map of Camp Cody
- Location: Freedom, New Hampshire
- Type: Summer camp
- Water: Ossipee Lake
- Established: 1926
- Website: campcody.com

Camp Cody in Freedom, New Hampshire, is a traditional, overnight, international, and co-ed summer camp, located along the shore of Ossipee Lake. Established in 1926 by Philip Axman in Cambridge, Maryland, Camp Cody began as a camp for boys, named after William "Buffalo Bill" Cody. It moved to its current site of Freedom, New Hampshire, in 1941, where it remained a boys camp until 2001. Beginning as a camp with just 50 campers enrolled, the camp now serves hundreds of families from all over the US and around the world, with a typical camper stay of two or four weeks. The campus, also referred to as the Cody Outdoor Center, is currently host to weddings, outsourced camp groups, events, conferences, and its own nature education program. The site functions year-round.

== History ==
Philip Axman, the founder of Camp Cody, was the Director of Physical Education and Head Basketball Coach at Baltimore City College. The nickname "Coach" remained in place throughout his ownership of Camp Cody (until about the mid 1950s) and his life, with devoted Cody alumni still referring to him as such, thereafter. Axman founded Camp Cody in Cambridge, Maryland, as an athletics-based summer camp for boys age 5–15. A stay at camp lasted eight weeks, with a fee of $250. Soon, the many mosquitoes and sea nettles caused Axman to relocate the camp to Little Meadows, Pennsylvania. Due to problems related to improper site management on behalf of the facility owner, the camp relocated one final time to its current location in Freedom, New Hampshire, in 1941, after Axman discovered a site for sale on the shores of Ossipee Lake. The site on Ossipee Lake was previously owned and maintained by an all girls camp, Camp Adeawonda. Various original structures remain standing today, such as the original administration building.

Upon Axman becoming ill, family members Louis and Philip Bluefeld helped run the camp for several years until selling it to Dr. Alan J. Stolz and his family in 1960. Throughout Axman's ownership, campers continued coming primarily from Baltimore, Maryland. Stolz pioneered international summer camp exchanges in the United States. Philip Ross joined the operation in 1978, bringing a camp of about 100 campers to 240. In 1982, Camp Cody began being run by the Ross family who, in 2001, turned the camp into a co-ed camp for boys and girls, and began offering two and four week camp sessions.

== Program ==
In Camp Cody's beginnings, there were about 10 primarily sports-based activities. Days focused around swimming in the lake. Today, there are more than 30 activities, both on land and water. There are additional activities offered off-site, such as horseback riding and golf. Trips go out with different age groups daily, including hikes, water parks, amusement parks, city trips, and whitewater rafting. The camp offers tutoring and English as a second language (ESL).
