= Blaze Berdahl =

American actress (born 1980)

- Born: Blaze Autumn Berdahl; September 6, 1980 (age 45); New York City, U.S.
- Occupation: Actress
- Years active: 1989–present
- Website: blazeberdahl.net

Blaze Autumn Berdahl (born September 6, 1980) is an American actress best known for her roles as Lenni Frazier in the children's television series Ghostwriter and Ellie Creed in the film Pet Sematary (1989).

== Early life ==
Berdahl was born on September 6, 1980, in New York City, the youngest daughter of Rita, a teacher, and Roger Berdahl, an actor. She was born just one minute after her twin sister, Beau Dakota Berdahl, a talent agent. She also has an older brother, Sky Ashley Berdahl, a periodontist. Berdahl was a student at Bucknell University in Lewisburg, Pennsylvania.

== Career ==
Berdahl made her film debut in the 1989 Stephen King adaptation of Pet Sematary.

She did voiceover work for Richard Scarry's Best ABC Video Ever! in 1989.

From 1992 to 1995, she played Lenni Frazier on the PBS children's show Ghostwriter. She also appeared on the TV series Aliens in the Family and Third Watch. She was interviewed in a 2017 documentary film Unearthed & Untold: The Path to Pet Sematary.

As an adult, Berdahl is primarily an announcer and narrator.

== Personal life ==
On July 15, 2007, Berdahl married Stephen M. Tvardek of North Potomac, Maryland. Tvardek works at UBS as a Product Manager. The ceremony was held at the Onteora Mountain House in Boiceville, New York.
