= Andrew Hubatsek =

American theatre director

Andrew Hubatsek is an associate ensemble member of Bloomsburg Theatre Ensemble. He is also an actor, who performed in and directed such shows as On the Westward Trail and Y1K, Life in the Year 1000.

He also played the character of Zelda Goldman in the 1989 film Pet Sematary, and a cashier in Blue Steel (1990). He was interviewed in a 2017 documentary film Unearthed & Untold: The Path to Pet Sematary.

Hubatsek along with other people in the community works as a theater teacher in a popular theater group.
