= Fear (1988 film) =

1988 film

- Directed by: Robert A. Ferretti
- Screenplay by: Rick Scarry; Kathryn Connell
- Produced by: Lisa M. Hansen; Paul Hertzberg
- Starring: Cliff DeYoung; Kay Lenz
- Cinematography: Dana Christiaansen
- Edited by: Michael Eliot
- Music by: Alfi Kabiljo
- Production company: CineTel Films
- Distributed by: CineTel Films
- Release date: November 16, 1988
- Language: English

Fear is a 1988 American action-thriller direct-to-video film directed by Robert A. Ferretti and starring Cliff DeYoung and Kay Lenz.

== Cast ==
- Cliff De Young as Don Haden
- Kay Lenz as Sharon Haden
- Zoe Trilling as Jennifer Haden
- Scott Schwartz as Brian Haden
- Robert Factor as Jack Gracie
- Frank Stallone as Armitage
- Charles Meshack as Cyril Ganelle
- Michael Watson as Mitch Barnett
- Brendan Burns as Merle Johnson
- Edward Bunker as Lenny
- Bart Burns as Link Reilley
- Michael B. Christy as Agent Jones
