= Relentless (1989 film) =

1989 American crime film directed by William Lustig

- Theatrical Release Poster
- Directed by: William Lustig
- Written by: Jack T.D. Robinson
- Produced by: Paul Hertzberg; Lisa M. Hansen; Howard W. Koch
- Starring: Judd Nelson; Robert Loggia; Leo Rossi; Meg Foster
- Cinematography: James Lemmo
- Music by: Jay Chattaway
- Distributed by: New Line Cinema; CineTel Films
- Release date: August 30, 1989
- Running time: 92 minutes
- Country: United States
- Language: English
- Budget: $4 million
- Box office: $6.9 million (domestic)

Relentless is a 1989 American crime thriller film directed by William Lustig and starring Judd Nelson, Robert Loggia and Leo Rossi. The film follows two LAPD officers on a hunt for a serial killer.

Relentless was the first in a series of four films starring Leo Rossi as detective Sam Dietz trying to stop a serial killer. The three sequels were all filmed and released straight to video within three consecutive years from 1992 to 1994.

== Plot ==
Sam Dietz is a rookie Los Angeles detective recently transferred from New York City. He is paired up with veteran detective Bill Malloy in order to find and stop a serial killer. The killer is Arthur "Buck" Taylor, the son of a former LAPD cop whose motive for killing is frustration over not having been accepted into the force and a failure in the eyes of his father. Taylor chooses his targets by randomly looking up their names in the phone book and skillfully covering up his tracks by using his skills and knowledge that he learned while on the force. While in pursuit of Taylor, both Dietz and Malloy become his next planned targets for murder.

== Cast ==
- Judd Nelson as Arthur "Buck" Taylor
- Robert Loggia as Bill Malloy
- Leo Rossi as Sam Dietz
- Meg Foster as Carol Dietz
- Patrick O'Bryan as Todd Arthur
- Ken Lerner as Arthur
- Angel Tompkins as Carmen
- Beau Starr as Ike Taylor
- Ron Taylor as Captain Blakely
- Roy Brocksmith as The Coroner

== Production ==
After the success of Maniac Cop, producer Leonard Shapiro of Shapiro-Glickenhaus Entertainment wanted to do another picture with director William Lustig, and presented him with a bunch of scripts that had been submitted to the company. Lustig came across a script by Phil Alden Robinson called "Sunset Slayer" that he thought was especially good, but when Shapiro's company ran into financial problems, Lustig ended up making the film for CineTel Films, and changed the title of the film to Relentless, which was the original title of the 1985 Sam Raimi movie Crimewave. Lustig had contacted Raimi and asked him permission to use the title. Raimi approved, and he was given a special thanks in the film’s end credits.

== Reception ==
The film received mixed reviews. On Rotten Tomatoes the film has an approval rating of 43% based on reviews from 7 critics.

== Sequels ==
Relentless was followed by three direct-to-video sequels, forming the Relentless film series.

- Dead On: Relentless II (1992)
- Relentless 3 (1993)
- Relentless IV: Ashes to Ashes (1994)
