= Ken Lerner =

American actor

- Born: Kenneth Lerner; May 27, 1948 (age 78); Brooklyn, New York, U.S.
- Education: Brooklyn College
- Occupation: Actor
- Years active: 1975–present
- Children: 2 including Sam
- Relatives: Michael Lerner (brother)
- Website: kenlerner.com

Kenneth Lerner (born May 27, 1948) is an American television, stage and film actor and acting coach. He is known for playing Principal Flutie in the first episodes of the television series Buffy the Vampire Slayer, and earlier roles on Happy Days, along with numerous film and television guest-starring roles.

== Early life ==
Lerner was born in Brooklyn, New York, of Romanian-Jewish descent. He is the youngest of three sons of Blanche and George Lerner, who was a fisherman and antiques dealer. His brother was actor Michael Lerner who died in 2023. Originally wanting to be a teacher, he attended Brooklyn college where he obtained a Bachelor’s degree in English.

== Career ==
Lerner first became interested in acting when he was helping his actor brother Michael learn his lines. He took acting lessons from Roy London, who he continued to work with until London's death in 1993.

One of his first roles was as one of the Malachi Brothers in the television series Happy Days in 1975–76. His film debut was as Michael in the 1977 film Hot Tomorrows. Lerner is typically typecast as whiny or unlucky characters, including an agent who is stabbed in the back with a pen by Arnold Schwarzenegger's character Ben Richards in The Running Man. He had a role in the first series of Buffy the Vampire Slayer in 1997, as Principal Robert Flutie, who was killed a few episodes into the show.

Lerner has had parts in shows including The A-Team, The Golden Girls, Friends, Scrubs, NCIS, Desperate Housewives, Two and a Half Men, The Mentalist, and Monster: The Jeffrey Dahmer Story and in films such as Gas Pump Girls, Hit List, RoboCop 2, and The Exorcist III, and voiced Walter Mensch in the 2011 video game L.A. Noire.

In 2011, Lerner was seen in an American nationally televised commercial for Wells Fargo Bank. He played Dr. Schneider in a 2012 episode of The Big Bang Theory. In late 2013, Lerner starred in a commercial for T-Mobile USA. In 2016, Lerner played a small role as a corrupt business manager named Arthur in the HBO television series Silicon Valley. For six years Lerner played a recurring role on the series The Goldbergs, as Lou Schwartz, father to character Geoff Schwartz, who was played by Ken's actual son, Sam.

Lerner is represented by Ellis Talent Group. He also works as an acting teacher in his studio, The Ken Lerner Studio and has also taught at New York Foundation for the Arts.

== Personal life ==
Lerner has two children: Sam and Jennifer, both of whom are also actors.

== Selected filmography ==
- 1975–1983 Happy Days as Frankie / Rocco Malachi / Rocco Baruffi (10 episodes)
- 1977 Hot Tomorrows as Michael
- 1977 Grand Theft Auto as Eagle I
- 1979 Gas Pump Girls as 'Peewee', Member of The Vultures Motorcycle Gang
- 1980 Any Which Way You Can as Tony Paoli Jr.
- 1984 Irreconcilable Differences as Doctor
- 1985 Secret Admirer as Waiter
- 1985 Love on the Run as Aaron
- 1985 The A-Team (TV Series) as Cruise Crew Member
- 1986 Miracles as Stuart
- 1986 Jake Speed as Ken
- 1986 It's a Living as Dr Cutler
- 1987 Project X as Finley
- 1987 The Running Man as Agent
- 1988 Maniac Cop as Mayor Killium (uncredited) (Scenes not present in USA release, added in Japanese version as a subplot)
- 1989 Hit List as Gravenstein
- 1989 Relentless as Arthur
- 1989 The Fabulous Baker Boys as Ray
- 1989 Immediate Family as Josh
- 1990 The Golden Girls as Doctor (Season 6, Episode 1: "Blanche Delivers")
- 1990 RoboCop 2 as Tom Delaney
- 1990 The Exorcist III as Dr. Freedman
- 1991 Fast Getaway as Tony Bush
- 1991 The Doctor as Pete
- 1991 Diary of a Hitman as Optometrist
- 1991 And You Thought Your Parents Were Weird as Matthew Carson, Home Movies
- 1992 Unlawful Entry as Roger Graham
- 1993 Mother's Boys as Jude's Analyst
- 1994 Rave Review as Saul Slobin
- 1994 Fast Getaway II as Tony Bush
- 1994 Relentless IV: Ashes to Ashes as Al Rosenberg
- 1994 ER (TV Series) as Harry Stopek (Season 1, Episode 4)
- 1995 For Better or Worse as Sergeant Moss
- 1995 Bodily Harm as Alex Shaw
- 1995 JAG as James Reid (Season 1, Episode 5)
- 1996 Dead Girl as Producer
- 1997 Buffy the Vampire Slayer (TV Series) as Principal Bob Flutie
- 1997 High Voltage as Justice of The Peace (uncredited)
- 1998 Senseless as Dean Barlow
- 1998 Godzilla as Teacher (uncredited)
- 1999 The Story of Us as Dr. Rifkin
- 2000 Boys Life 3 as Judge Levin (segment "Inside Out")
- 2000 Cousin Skeeter as Security Guard
- 2001 The Woman Every Man Wants as Rosen
- 2001 They Crawl as Glen, The Coroner
- 2001 Mafioso: The Father, the Son as Sid Freeman
- 2002 ER (TV Series) as Mr. Sidell (Season 8, Episode 18)
- 2003 National Security as Hank's Lawyer
- 2003 Friends as Professor Spafford (Season 9, Episode 20: "The One with the Soap Opera Party")
- 2003 Frankie and Johnny Are Married as Rob, Production Manager
- 2004 True Vinyl as Hotel Clerk
- 2005 Scrubs (TV Series) as Charles James
- 2005 Jesus, Mary and Joey as Saulley
- 2006 All In as Rosenbloom
- 2006 NCIS (TV Series, in Bloodbath) as Albert Hencheck (uncredited)
- 2006 Undisputed II: Last Man Standing as Phil Gold
- 2009 Desperate Housewives (TV Series) as Dr. Bernstein
- 2009 Two and a Half Men (TV Series) as Dr. Levine
- 2011 L.A. Noire (Video Game) as Walter Mensch (voice)
- 2011 The Mentalist (TV Series) as Judge Markland
- 2012 The Big Bang Theory (TV Series) as Dr. Schneider (Season 6, Episode 4: "The Re-Entry Minimization")
- 2012 Southland (TV Series) as Mr. Kahan (Season 4, Episode 3: Community)
- 2013 Anger Management (TV Series) as Judge
- 2016 Silicon Valley (TV Series) as Arthur
- 2016 The People v. O.J. Simpson: American Crime Story as Howard Weitzman
- 2017-2023 The Goldbergs (TV Series) as Lou Schwartz
- 2018 Bayou Caviar as Shlomo
- 2022 Dahmer – Monster: The Jeffrey Dahmer Story as Joe Zilber
