= CineTel =

CineTel can refer to:

- CineTel Films, an independent film distributor
- CineTel Productions, which became Scripps Productions after being bought out by E. W. Scripps Company
