= Paul Hertzberg =

American film producer and former actor

- Born: December 7, 1949 (age 76); United States
- Occupations: Film producer, actor

Paul Hertzberg (born December 7, 1949) is an American film producer and former actor. His genres included thrillers, action, drama, and sci-fi. He was the president and chief executive officer of CineTel Films, Inc. Alongside his company's vice president, Lisa M. Hansen, Hertzberg also frequently made cameos in the films he was involved with.

== Career ==
Hertzberg founded Chicago Teleproductions in 1980 and recruited Hansen a year later. They later moved to Los Angeles in 1983 to do sales for the company, which was renamed CineTel Films. Later, during the early 1980s, Hertzberg, along with Hansen, went to Cannes for the first time and attended what would later become MIPCOM. During the festival, the two CineTel executives found themselves with unsalable entertainment shows, with the exception of Hansen's film acquisition The Courier of Death, which sold out quickly. Observing this success, CineTel switched its business focus from television programming to feature film production.

Under Hertzberg's auspices and direct involvement since its founding, CineTel became one of the leading independent production and distribution companies in the entertainment industry. He said, "From the company's inception, we placed a major emphasis on the creation of quality product at reasonable cost. This has remained central to our company's philosophy and has been directly responsible for our success."

He is a member of the Academy of Motion Picture Arts and Sciences-Producers Division, the Screen Actors Guild, and has served as a consultant to the American Film Marketing Association Publications and Research Committee. He served two terms as Chairman of the Independent Film and Television Alliance.

== Filmography ==
Producer
Year	Title	Role	Notes
1986	Say Yes	associate producer	completed in 1982
1986	The Tomb	executive producer	
1986	Armed Response	producer	a.k.a. Jade Jungle
1987	Cyclone	producer	
1987	Cold Steel	executive producer	
1988	Fear	producer	a.k.a. Honor Betrayed
1988	Bulletproof	producer	
1988	976-EVIL	executive producer	
1989	Hit List	producer	
1989	Relentless	executive producer	
1989	Tripwire	executive producer	
1990	Far Out Man	executive producer	a.k.a. Soul Man II
1991	Fast Getaway	producer	direct-to-video
1991	Past Midnight	executive producer	
1991	Where the Day Takes You	producer	
1991	976-Evil II	producer	a.k.a. 976-EVIL 2: The Astral Factor (UK: DVD box title) (US: video box title) and 976 EVIL II: The Return (UK: video title)
1992	Dead On: Relentless II	executive producer	a.k.a. Dead On and Relentless II: Dead On (US: video title); direct-to-video
1992	We're Talking Serious Money	producer	
1993	Relentless 3	producer	a.k.a. Relentless III (US: TV title); direct-to-video
1994	Teresa's Tattoo	executive producer	
1994	Fast Getaway II	executive producer	direct-to-video
1994	Relentless IV: Ashes to Ashes	executive producer	direct-to-video
1995	Dream a Little Dream 2	producer	direct-to-video
1995	Excessive Force II: Force on Force	executive producer	
1996	Vampirella	producer	direct-to-video
1996	Demolition High	executive producer	direct-to-video
1996	Poison Ivy II	producer	a.k.a. Poison Ivy 2 and Poison Ivy II: Lily
1996	Carried Away	producer	a.k.a. Acts of Love
1997	Below Utopia	producer	a.k.a. Body Count (video title)
1998	Butter	producer	a.k.a. Never 2 Big (US: video box title)
1998	The Pandora Project	executive producer	
1999	The Settlement	executive producer	
1999	Supreme Sanction	executive producer	TV film
1999	Judgment Day	producer	direct-to-video
1999	Stealth Fighter	executive producer	
2000	Chain of Command	producer	TV film
2000	Green Sails	executive producer	TV film
2000	Militia	producer	
2000	A Rumor of Angels	producer	a.k.a. A Rumour of Angels (UK)
2001	They Crawl	producer	
2001	Guardian	producer	
2001	Time Lapse	producer	direct-to-video
2002	Project Viper	producer	TV film
2002	Storm Watch	producer	
2002	Malevolent	producer	
2002	Scorcher	producer	
2002	Global Effect	producer	
2002–2003	Hotel Erotica	executive producer	25 episodes
2003	Detonator	producer	a.k.a. Detonator - Spiel gegen die Zeit (Germany)
2003	Lost Treasure	producer	
2003	Momentum	producer	TV film; a.k.a. Momentum - Wenn Gedanken töten können (Germany: DVD title) and Projekt Momentum (Germany)
2003	Devil Winds	executive producer	TV film
2004	Gargoyle	executive producer	direct-to-video; a.k.a. Gargoyles' Revenge (International: English title) and Gargoyle: Wings of Darkness (US: TV title)
2005	Cerberus	executive producer	TV film
2005	Crash Landing	producer	
2005	Komodo vs. Cobra	producer	TV film; a.k.a. KVC: Komodo vs. Cobra (US: DVD box title) and Komodo vs. King Cobra (US: long title)
2006	Caved In	executive producer	TV film; a.k.a. Caved In: Prehistoric Terror (US: long title)
2006	A.I. Assault	producer	direct-to-video; a.k.a. Shockwave (US: DVD title)
2007	Bone Eater	producer	TV film
2008	Sea Beast	executive producer	TV film; a.k.a. Troglodyte (original title)
2009	Ratko: The Dictator's Son	executive producer	a.k.a. National Lampoon's Ratko: The Dictator's Son (US: complete title)
2009	Wyvern	executive producer	TV film
2009	Hydra	producer	TV film
2009	Polar Storm	executive producer	TV film
2009	Ice Twisters	executive producer	
2010	Icarus	executive producer	a.k.a. The Killing Machine (US: working title)
2010	I Spit on Your Grave	producer	
2010	Mongolian Death Worm	executive producer	TV film
2010	Stonehenge Apocalypse	executive producer	TV film
2010	Mandrake	executive producer	TV film
2010	Ice Quake	executive producer	
2011	Iron Invader	executive producer	TV film; a.k.a. Iron Golem (US title) and Metal Shifters (Canada: TV title)
2011	Collision Earth	executive producer	TV film
2011	Doomsday Prophecy	executive producer	TV film
2011	Seeds of Destruction	executive producer	TV film; a.k.a. The Terror Beneath (original title)
2011	Earth's Final Hours	executive producer	TV film
2011	Snowmageddon	executive producer	TV film
2011	End of the Innocents	executive producer	short film
2012	Mega Cyclone	executive producer	TV film
2012	The Philadelphia Experiment	executive producer	TV film
2012	The 12 Disasters of Christmas	executive producer	TV film; a.k.a. The 12 Disasters (US: TV title)
2013	I Spit on Your Grave 2	producer	
2013	Grave Halloween	executive producer	
2014	Zodiac: Signs of the Apocalypse	executive producer	TV film
2014	Christmas Icetastrophe	executive producer	TV film
2015	Earthfall	executive producer	direct-to-video
2015	Fire Twister	executive producer	
2015	LA Apocalypse	executive producer	direct-to-video
2015	Lavalantula	executive producer	TV film
2015	I Spit on Your Grave III: Vengeance Is Mine	executive producer	
2015	Stormageddon	executive producer	
2016	Drone Wars	executive producer	
2016	Dam Sharks	executive producer	TV film
2016	2 Lava 2 Lantula!	executive producer	TV film
2016	Earthtastrophe	executive producer	TV film
2016	Shadows of the Dead	executive producer	TV film
2016	Mind Blown	executive producer	TV film
2017	Global Meltdown	executive producer	TV film
2017	Pandora's Box	executive producer	TV film; a.k.a. Doomsday Device (original title)
2017	Truth or Dare	executive producer	TV film
2019	Kill Chain	producer	
2019	Acceleration	executive producer	

Actor
Year(s)	Title	Role	Notes
1986	Say Yes	Businessman	Finished in 1982
1989	Relentless	Police Photographer	
1990	Far Out Man	Drunk with wine	a.k.a. Soul Man II
1992	976-Evil II	Anchorman	a.k.a. 976-EVIL 2: The Astral Factor (UK: DVD box title) (US: video box title) and 976 EVIL II: The Return (UK: video title)
1992	Dead On: Relentless II	Detective at House	a.k.a. Dead On and Relentless II: Dead On (US: video title)
1992	We're Talking Serious Money	Stiff	
1992	Munchie	Drunk Party Guest	
1993	Little Miss Millions	Delbert Botts	a.k.a. Home for Christmas (US: video title) and ... Little Miss Zillions

Other
Year(s)	Title	Role	Notes
1986	Armed Response	writer (story)	a.k.a. Jade Jungle
1995	Black Scorpion	casting advisor	
1997	Poison Ivy: The New Seduction	special thanks	
