= Leo Rossi =

American actor

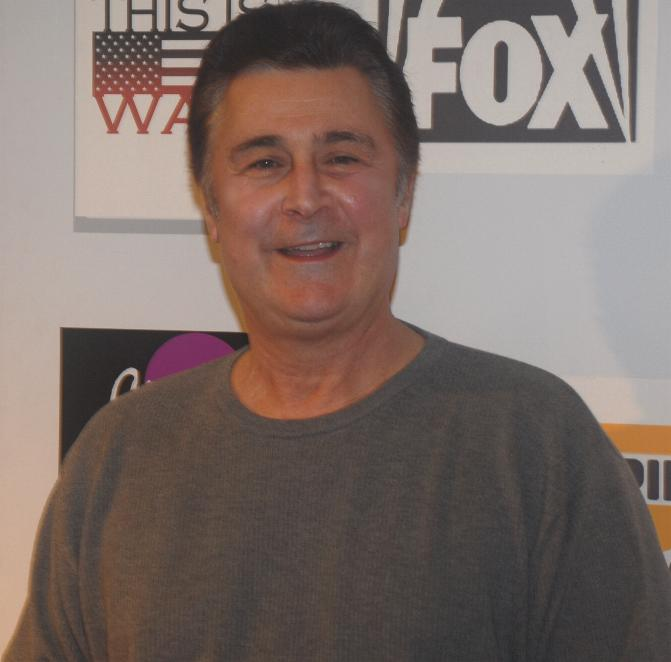
- Rossi at Cinema City film festival in 2008
- Born: June 26, 1946 (age 79); Trenton, New Jersey, U.S.
- Occupations: Actor; producer; screenwriter
- Years active: 1975–present

Leo Rossi (born June 26, 1946) is an American actor, writer and producer. He is a character actor known for his role as foul-mouthed EMT Vincent "Budd" Scarlotti in the 1981 horror film Halloween II, as the serial killer Turkell from the 1990 horror sequel Maniac Cop 2, and as Detective Sam Dietz in the Relentless franchise. His other films include Heart Like a Wheel (1983), River's Edge (1986), The Accused (1988), Analyze This (1999), One Night at McCool's (2001), and 10th & Wolf (2006).

== Career ==
Rossi began his career with small roles in films including the Rick Rosenthal-directed – John Carpenter-scripted – Halloween II (1981) with Jamie Lee Curtis and Donald Pleasence, in which he falls victim to the suburban maniac Michael Myers. Subsequent roles in Jonathan Kaplan's Heart Like a Wheel (1983) opposite Bonnie Bedelia and Beau Bridges, Tim Hunter's River's Edge (1986) with Dennis Hopper and Keanu Reeves, and Bob Rafelson's Black Widow (1987) – also with Hopper, Theresa Russell and Debra Winger – paved the way for a starring role opposite Jodie Foster and Kelly McGillis in Kaplan's The Accused (1988) as the film's central antagonist, Cliff "Scorpion" Albrect. The Accused in turn led to Rossi winning a starring role in William Lustig's Relentless (1989), a serial killer film which co-stars Judd Nelson and Robert Loggia; however, this time Rossi plays the central protagonist – Detective Sam Deitz – a role he would reprise in three sequels. Rossi followed up Relentless with Lustig's Maniac Cop 2 (1990), a horror film sequel starring Bruce Campbell and scripted by Larry Cohen.

During the 1980s, Rossi made guest appearances in the police procedural Hill Street Blues (1982), a recurring role; the science fiction series Amazing Stories by Steven Spielberg (1985); the crime drama 21 Jump Street with Johnny Depp (1988); and the Vietnam War drama Tour of Duty (1989).

Rossi began the 1990s with a performance in the 1991 action comedy Fast Getaway, about a father (Rossi) and son (Corey Haim) who rob banks together until the former is caught and imprisoned, and the latter is forced to break him out. Rossi then took a supporting role in Where the Day Takes You (1992), played a detective in the Pamela Anderson vehicle Raw Justice (1994), a street preacher in the teen comedy Dream a Little Dream 2 (1995) starring Corey Feldman and Corey Haim, and reprised his role opposite Haim in Fast Getaway 2 (1994). Rossi had a supporting role in the Harold Ramis comedy Analyze This (1999), in which he plays the evil cousin to Robert De Niro's character; other co-stars include Billy Crystal, Chazz Palminteri, and Lisa Kudrow.

His television appearances during the 1990s included Murder She Wrote (1992), Frasier (1997), JAG and a recurring role in ER (TV series) (1999). He portrayed a special agent in Kaplan's adaptation of Truman Capote's psychological drama In Cold Blood (1996); the latter – a miniseries set in 1950s America – co-stars Sam Neill and Eric Roberts.

In the 2000s saw Rossi took a supporting role in the Harald Zwart comedy One Night at McCool's (2001), The same year he accepted a role in the mobster thriller One Eyed King (2001). Next came a supporting role in the experimental drama The Business of Fancydancing (2002) and a part in Looney Tunes: Back in Action (2003), a live action-animation comedy directed by Joe Dante. Rossi then both produced and starred in the thriller 10th & Wolf (2006), in which he plays an FBI Agent partnered with Brian Dennehy who attempt to infiltrate a Sicilian Mafia family business. 10th & Wolf is loosely based upon the real-life Philadelphia crime family mafia war in the 1990s.

In TV, Rossi starred in another drama based on the life of Joseph D. Pistone, the 2000 CBS series Falcone, which is based on Pistone and Richard Woodley's book Donnie Brasco: My Undercover Life in the Mafia. He also appeared in Judging Amy (2001) and Without a Trace (2006).

== Filmography ==
=== Films ===
- Alias Big Cherry (1975) – Big Cherry
- Mr. Billion (1977) – Italian Kidnapper
- Grand Theft Auto (1977) – Vegas Muscle Chief
- The Pirate (1978) TV Movie – Shadin
- Circle of Power (1983) – Chris Morris
- Halloween II (1981) – Budd Scarlotti
- Heart Like a Wheel (1983) – Jack Muldowney
- Kids Don't Tell (1985, TV Movie) – Detective Rastelli
- River's Edge (1986) – Jim
- Black Widow (1987) – Detective Ricci
- Russkies (1987) – Keefer
- Leonard Part 6 (1987) – Chef
- Out of Time (1988, TV Movie) – Hawkins
- The Accused (1988) – Cliff Scorpion Albrect
- Maniac Cop (1988) – Mayor's Chief of Staff (uncredited)
- Hit List (1989) – Frank DeSalvo
- Relentless (1989) – Sam Dietz
- Maniac Cop 2 (1990) – Steven Turkell
- Too Much Sun (1990) – George
- Fast Getaway (1991) – Sam Potter
- Where the Day Takes You (1992) – Mr. Burtis
- We're Talkin' Serious Money (1992) – Charlie
- Dead On: Relentless II (1992) – Sam Dietz
- Casualties of Love: The "Long Island Lolita" Story (1993, TV Movie) – Bobby Buttafuoco
- Relentless 3 (1993) – Sam Dietz
- Rave Review (1994) – Brian
- Fast Getaway II (1994) – Sam Potter
- Runaway Daughters (1994) – Deputy 2
- Raw Justice a.k.a. Good Cop Bad Cop (1994) – Lieutenant David Atkins
- Reform School Girl (1994, TV Movie) – Disc Jockey
- Relentless IV: Ashes to Ashes (1994) – Detective Sam Dietz
- The Misery Brothers (1995) – Michael Misery
- Mutant Species (1995) – Hollinger
- Felony (1995) – Detective Kincade
- Dream a Little Dream 2 (1995) – Street Preacher (Uncredited)
- In the Kingdom of the Blind, the Man with One Eye Is King (1995) – Moran
- Beyond Desire (1995) – Frank Zulla
- The Assault (1996) – Zigowski
- Wedding Bell Blues (1996) – Robert
- True Friends (1998) – Carmine
- Unconditional Love (1999) – Martin Ward
- Analyze This (1999) – Carlo Mangano
- The Mating Habits of the Earthbound Human (1999) – Mr. Smith
- Fashionably L.A. (1999) – Acting Teacher
- Fatal Conflict (2000) – Conrad Nash
- Crackerjack 3 (2000) – Ricky Santeria-Ramos
- Separate Ways (2001)
- Road to Redemption (2001) – Sully Santoro
- Sticks (2001) – 'Domino'
- One Night at McCool's (2001) – Joey Dinardo
- One Eyed King (2001) – Joe 'Big Joe' Thomas
- The Syndicate (2002) Short Film – Mr. Gianelli
- Four Deadly Reasons (2002) – Otto
- The Business of Fancydancing (2002) – Mr. Williams
- Deranged (2002) – Artie
- Looney Tunes: Back in Action (2003) – Acme Vice President, Climbing to the Top
- The Last Letter (2004) – Judge
- Mafioso: The Father, the Son (2004) – Vito Lupo
- Shut Up and Kiss Me (2004) – Mario
- Back by Midnight (2004) – 'Rusty'
- Diamond Zero (2005) – Augustine Garza
- All In (2006) – Dr. Hamilton
- 10th & Wolf (2006) – Agent Thornton
- A Modern Twain Story: The Prince and the Pauper (2007) – Officer Harold
- The Nail: Joey Nardone Story (2009) – Petey
- PriMates (2010) – Ray
- Sinatra Club (2010) – Castellano
- Exodus Fall (2011) – Ford Ashworth
- The Unlikely's (2012) – Gerald Maxwell
- The Independents (2013) – David The Barber
- Fragments from Olympus: The Vision of Nikola Tesla (2013) – Henry
- On Painted Wings (2014) – The Boss
- Gotti (2018) – Bobby Boriello

=== TV appearances ===
- Hill Street Blues – Domestic Beef – Season 3, episode 2 (1982) – Jon Gennaro
- Hill Street Blues – Heat Rash – Season 3, episode 3 (1982) – Jon Gennaro
- Hill Street Blues – Rain of Terror – Season 3, episode 4 (1982) – Jon Gennaro
- T.J. Hooker – Lady in Blue – Season 2, episode 22 (1983) – Joe Tate
- Mike Hammer, Private Eye – Satan, Cyanide and Murder – Season 1, episode 10 (1984)
- Partners in Crime – Season 1, episodes 1–13 (1984) – Lieutenant Ed Vronsky
- Cagney & Lacey – Victimless Crime – Season 3, episode 3 (1984) – Moslovsky
- ABC Afterschool Specials – One Too Many – Season 13, episode 7 (1985) – Mr. Jenkins
- Hunter – Case X – Season 2, episode 1 (1985) – Tony Cochran
- Steven Spielberg's Amazing Stories – Mr. Magic – Season 1, episode 8 (1985) – Murray
- Hardcastle and McCormick – In the Eye of the Beholder – Season 3, episode 20 (1986) – Marvin
- T.J. Hooker – Into the Night – Season 5, episode 17 (1986) – Salvatore Martel
- Cagney & Lacey – Role Call – Season 6, episode 5 (1986) – Public Relations Man
- Stingray – Anytime, Anywhere – Season 2, episode 13 (1987) – Johnny
- CBS Summer Playhouse – Reno and Yolanda – Season 1, episode 13 (1987) – Ricky Barron
- A Year in the Life – Goodbye to All That – Season 1, episode 15 (1988) – Mel
- The Bronx Zoo – Career Day – Season 2, episode 5 (1988) – Tauber
- Simon & Simon – Simon & Simon and Associates – Season 8, episode 2 (1988) – Al Krantz
- 21 Jump Street – Slippin' Into Darkness – Season 3, episode 2 – (1988)- Sergeant Walker
- Tour of Duty – Saigon: Part 1 – Season 2, episode 1 (1989) – Jake Bridger
- Tour of Duty – Saigon: Part 2 – Season 2, episode 2 (1989) – Jake Bridger
- Murder, She Wrote – Murder on Madison Avenue – Season 8, episode 22 (1992) – Lieutenant Hornbeck
- Mr. & Mrs. Smith – The Impossible Mission Episode – Season 1, episode 11 (1996) – Shelley
- In Cold Blood (miniseries) (1996) – Agent Harold Nye
- Frasier – Liar! Liar! – Season 4, episode 10 (1997)
- Early Edition – Mob Wife – Season 1, episode 13 (1997) – Frank Pirelli
- JAG – Dungaree Justice – Season 4, episode 12 (1999) – Peter Reardon
- Sons of Thunder – Lost & Found – Season 1, episode 4 (1999) – Anthony Cardone
- ER – Humpty Dumpty – Season 6, episode 7 (1999) – Detective Cruson
- ER – Family Matters – Season 6, episode 10 (2000) – Detective Cruson
- Falcone – Pilot – Season 1, episode 1 (2000) – Noah Dietrich
- Falcone – Double Exposure – Season 1, episode 4 (2000) – Noah Dietrich
- Falcone – But Not Forgotten – Season 1, episode 7 (2000) – Noah Dietrich
- Falcone – Paying the Piper – Season 1, episode 9 (2000) – Noah Dietrich
- Judging Amy – Rights of Passage – Season 3, episode 8 (2001) – Mr. Schmeltzer
- Without a Trace – Candy – Season 5, episode 2 (2006) – Leo

=== Writer ===
- We're Talking Serious (1992) – Writer (also Charlie)
- Mafioso: The Father, the Son (2004) – Writer (also Vito Lupo)
- Gotti (2017) – Writer (also Bobby Boriello)

=== Producer ===
- We're Talkin' Serious (1992) – Co-Producer
- Relentless 3 (1993) – Co-Producer
- Relentless IV: Ashes to Ashes (1994) – Co-Producer
- 10th & Wolf (2006) – Producer
- The Nail: The Story of Joey Nordone (2009) – Producer
- PriMates (2010) – Co-Producer

=== Music department ===
- Project X (1987) – Vocalizations

=== Self ===
- Actors Entertainment (TV series), episode ActorsE Chat with Joe Sabatino and Leo Rossi (2009)
- Actors Reporters Interviews (TV Series), episode Exclusive Interviews with Working Actors Peter Onorati, Leo Rossi, James Quattrochi, Joe Sabatino (2009)
- The Nightmare Isn't Over: The Making of Halloween II (2012)

== Awards and nominations ==
Year	Association	Nominated work	Category	Result	Ref(s)
2019	Golden Raspberry Awards	Gotti	Worst Screenplay	Nominated	
