= Gargoyle: Wings of Darkness =

- Directed by: Jim Wynorski (as Jay Andrews)
- Written by: Ion Ionescu
- Screenplay by: Jay Andrews; Anthony L. Greene; Bill Munroe
- Produced by: Peter Block; Paul Hertzberg; Lisa M. Hansen; Daniel March; Kevin Tannehill (executive producers); Neil Elman; Vicky L. Sawyer (co-producers); Jay Andrews; Michael Derbas; Ion Ionescu
- Starring: Michael Paré; Sandra Hess; Fintan McKeown; Kate Orsini
- Cinematography: Andrea V. Rossotto
- Edited by: Michael Kuge
- Music by: Neal Acree
- Production companies: CineTel Films; Lions Gate Films; Avrio Filmworks
- Distributed by: CineTel Films; Lions Gate Films; Sci Fi Channel (TV)
- Release date: October 30, 2004 (United States)
- Running time: 87 minutes
- Countries: United States; Romania; Canada
- Languages: English; Romanian

Gargoyle: Wings of Darkness (also known as Gargoyles' Revenge) is a 2004 film that was distributed by CineTel Films and Lionsgate. It was first aired on the Sci Fi Channel.

== Plot ==
In 1592 Romania, villagers tormented by an evil demon ultimately succeed in sealing the creature away in a tomb, until a series of earthquakes in 2004 finally unleashes the evil thought to have vanished from the earth forever. Now, two CIA agents Ty 'Griff' Griffin and Jennifer Wells who have been sent to Bucharest to investigate a kidnapping must solve the string of brutal murders that are multiplying rapidly. Unfortunately, they have no idea of the enormity of the evil they face. As their investigation leads them astray, the monster has reproduced, and gargoyle eggs are hatching a reign of terror worldwide. The result is a struggle between good and evil of mythological proportions.

== Cast ==
- Michael Paré as CIA Agent Ty "Griff" Griffin
- Sandra Hess as CIA Agent Jennifer Wells
- Fintan McKeown as Father Nikolai Soren
- Kate Orsini as Dr. Christina Durant
- Tim Abell as Lucian "Lex The Slayer" Slavati, Romanian Club Entertainer & Crime Boss
- William Langlois as Inspector Zev Aslan
- Petri Roega as Father Adrian Bodesti
- Rene Rivera as Gogol Solacka, Romanian Kidnapper
- Arthur Roberts as Bishop At Monastery
- Jason Rohrer as Dr. Richard Barrier
- Mihai Bisericanu as Gregor, Church Grounds Keeper
- Bogdan Uritescu as "Zero", Romanian Crime Boss
- Claudiu Trandafir as Boris, Man On Ferris Wheel
- Cristi Groza as Ionut, Teacher At Zoo
- Lewis Cojocar as Yuri, A Member of Gogol's Gang
- Jim Wynorski as Bogdan, Member of Lex's Gang
- Claudiu Istodor as 1532 Priest, That Captured & Imprisoned The Gargoyle
- Nataliya Zamilatska as Anca, Church Parishioner
- Annie Cerillo as Coroner
- Daniela Nane as Peasant Girl
- Roxana Baches as Lily, Romanian Entertainer At Lex's Club
- Alina Teodorescu as Lara #1, Romanian Entertainer At Lex's Club
- Alexandra Serb as Lara #2, Romanian Entertainer At Lex's Club
- Dan Fintescu as James Sloane, The Son of The U.S. Ambassador
- Alexandru Nicolae as Boy At Amusement Park #1
- Robert Barladeanu as Boy At Amusement Park #2
- Danut Masala as Boy At Amusement Park #3
- Stefan Ioniță as Boy At Amusement Park #4

== See also ==
- List of American films of 2004
