= Too Much Sun =

1991 film by Robert Downey Sr.

- Directed by: Robert Downey Sr.
- Written by: Robert Downey Sr. Laura Ernst; Al Schwartz
- Produced by: Lisa M. Hansen; Paul Hertzberg; Catalaine Knell; Seymour Morgenstern; Al Schwartz; Joe Bilella (co producer)
- Starring: Robert Downey Jr. Laura Ernst; Jim Haynie; Eric Idle; Ralph Macchio; Andrea Martin; Leo Rossi; Howard Duff
- Cinematography: Robert D. Yeoman
- Edited by: Joe D'Augustine
- Music by: David Robbins
- Distributed by: CineTel Films
- Release date: January 25, 1991
- Running time: 97 minutes
- Country: United States
- Language: English
- Budget: $2.25 million

Too Much Sun is a 1991 American comedy film directed by Robert Downey Sr. and starring Robert Downey Jr., Eric Idle, Andrea Martin, Allan Arbus, Ralph Macchio and Howard Duff in his final film appearance. It was filmed in Beverly Hills and Los Angeles, California. The film received generally negative reviews.

== Plot ==
A multimillionaire, O.M. Rivers, has two grown children, Sonny who is gay, and Bitsy who is a lesbian. The father knows that Bitsy is a lesbian, but is unaware that Sonny is gay, until he catches him with his lover. After being caught, Sonny confesses to being gay, and dad has a heart attack.

Shortly before he dies from the effects of the heart attack, he adds a condition to his will, prompted by a devious priest, that will split his $200 million fortune between his two children and the gardener, but there's a catch; Sonny or Bitsy must have a child through heterosexual intercourse in the next year, and if they don't, then the money goes to the church.

== Cast ==
- Allan Arbus as Vincent
- Robert Downey Jr. as Reed Richmond
- Howard Duff as O. M.
- Laura Ernst as Susan
- Lara Harris as Sister Ursula
- Jim Haynie as Father Kelly
- James Hong as Frank Sr.
- John Ide as Yacht Captain
- Eric Idle as Sonny
- Marin Kanter as Tiny Nun
- Jon Korkes as Fuzby Robinson
- Ralph Macchio as Frank Jr.
- Christopher Mankiewicz as the mailman
- Andrea Martin as Bitsy
- Leo Rossi as George
- Jennifer Rubin as Gracia
- Cara Sherman as Waitress
- Heidi Swedberg as Sister Agnes

== Background and production ==
Director Downey said he wanted to make a funny movie that didn't "stoop to cheap shots about gays, but also keep it believable." He recalls one scene that went too far and had to be taken out; "Idle swishes by and tosses off a lewd double entendre about lesbian sex." Downey claimed that at test screenings, gays and lesbians "are happy with the results, and said, thank god, there's some laughter." He also recalled when they were shopping the script around, they met multiple people who believed that with the AIDS crisis going on, a "movie with gays wasn't commercial; we had to have big names to get this film made." According to Downey, one of those big names was Alan Arkin, who was scheduled to play the priest in the film, but he was unavailable to do it. Regardless, he said it was Arkin and his sons name that helped "sell the movie to distributors in the first place."

== Reception ==
Kevin Thomas, reviewing for The Los Angeles Times, gave the film a negative review: "something that might have been made by a band of thumb-nosing high school students... a nasty business that lays waste to its large, gifted and game cast". Peter Travers summed up his review for Rolling Stone, "Downey has become what every true satirist fears most: outdated."

Karl Soehnlein of OutWeek wrote that "gays and lesbians may take the spotlight on the screen, but we seem to have been overlooked as potential audience members." Overall, he concluded that "there's very little a queer viewer will gain from watching this film". Film critic Vincent Canby stated it is a "comedy of loosely strung together farcical situations that, played at half speed, elicit more good will than sustained laughter; much of the comedy, avoids good taste like the plague."

Critic Mick LaSalle said the film "turns out to be more than a disappointment, it's a disaster and a joyless laughless experience." Overall, he opined that "this is a mess, with a group of undefined characters inconsistently following the whims of a confused screenplay." Ralph Novak from People Magazine wrote that it is an "insipid film with a lamebrain script". He went on to say that Ralph Macchio, has a "comedy touch that brings to mind a wrecking ball hitting a tree house; even Idle and Martin seem desperate."

Riese Bernard of Autostraddle was not impressed, writing that "this film is not a hidden gem, it is a shame, and therefore hidden on purpose; it's not simply terrible, it is a stain upon humanity; it is a farce without whimsy, an aggressively unfunny comedy and an allegedly LGBT-inclusive film riddled with really fucked up jokes." Bernard concluded that "its badness is inescapable, like a rotting tuna sandwich in a parked car on a hot day; a day, perhaps, with too much sun."

== See also ==
- List of LGBTQ-related films
- List of films considered the worst
