= Lisa M. Hansen =

American actress

- Born: Lisa Maria Hansen; United States
- Other names: L. M. Hansen; Lisa Hansen
- Occupations: Film producer, actress, screenwriter

Lisa M. Hansen is an American film producer, production manager, former actress, writer, and craft service person. She has worked in various genres, including thriller, action, drama, and science fiction. She once frequently made cameos in the movies she has been involved with.

== Life ==
Lisa Hansen grew up in Chicago, Illinois. She began her career in entertainment as a radio disc jockey in Gillette, Wyoming. Later on, she returned to Chicago to become program manager of Spectrum Pay-TV.

In 1981, Hansen was hired by Chicago Teleproductions, and in 1982, she was recruited by Paul Hertzberg, moving to Los Angeles with him to do sales for a new independent film studio called CineTel Films. Within a year, Hansen was promoted to vice president and then, the following year, to executive vice president.

In the early 1980s, Hansen and Hertzberg went to Cannes for the first time, attending would later become MIPCOM. During the festival, the two CineTel executives found themselves with entertainment shows that they "literally couldn't give away" with the exception of Hansen's film acquisition The Courier of Death, which sold out quickly; observing Hansen's success, CineTel Films switched its business focus from TV programming to feature film production—a turning point in the company's history.

In 1990, she was named president of the newly formed CineTel Pictures, located in Burbank, California. CineTel Pictures was a separate production from CineTel Films.

She was the president of CineTel Pictures, Inc. and executive vice president of CineTel Films, Inc.

== Filmography ==
Year	Film	Role	Notes
1984	E. Nick: A Legend in His Own Mind	executive producer	
1986	Armed Response	executive producer	a.k.a. Jade Jungle
1987	Cold Steel	producer & screenwriter	
1988	Fear	producer & actress	a.k.a. Honor Betrayed – as Belinda
1988	Bulletproof	executive producer	
1988	976-EVIL	producer	
1989	Hit List	executive producer & actress	as Sally, the store clerk
1989	Relentless	executive producer	
1989	Tripwire	co-producer	
1990	Masters of Menace	producer	
1990	Far Out Man	producer & actress	a.k.a. Soul Man II – as Police radio dispatcher
1990	Too Much Sun	producer	
1991	Fast Getaway	producer	direct-to-video
1991	Past Midnight	producer	
1991	Where the Day Takes You	executive producer	
1991	976-Evil II	executive producer	a.k.a. 976-EVIL 2: The Astral Factor (UK: DVD box title) (US: video box title) & a.k.a. 976-EVIL II: The Return (UK: video title)
1992	Dead On: Relentless II	producer, assistant director (second unit), unit production manager, & actress	a.k.a. Dead On & a.k.a. Relentless II: Dead On (US: video title) – as Cop #5; direct-to-video
1992	We're Talking Serious Money	executive producer	
1993	Relentless 3	producer	a.k.a. Relentless III (US: TV title); direct-to-video
1994	Dangerous Touch	producer	
1994	Teresa's Tattoo	producer & actress	as Hooker with Bird
1994	Fast Getaway II	unit production manager	direct-to-video
1994	Relentless IV: Ashes to Ashes	unit production manager	direct-to-video
1995	Black Scorpion	craft service	
1995	Excessive Force II: Force on Force	executive producer	
1996	Dead Girl	executive producer	
1996	Carried Away	producer & unit production manager	a.k.a. Acts of Love
1997	Below Utopia	producer & unit production manager	a.k.a. Body Count (video title)
1999	Judgment Day	producer	direct-to-video
1999	Supreme Sanction	producer	TV film
2000	Chain of Command	executive producer	TV film
2000	A Rumor of Angels	producer & unit production manager	a.k.a. A Rumour of Angels (UK)
2002	Project Viper	producer	
2002	Storm Watch	producer	a.k.a. Code Hunter (UK) (US: video title) & a.k.a. Virtual Storm (UK: DVD title) (US)
2002	Malevolent	producer	
2002	Scorcher	producer	
2002	Global Effect	producer	
2003	Written in Blood	producer	
2003	Detonator	producer	a.k.a. Detonator – Spiel gegen die Zeit (Germany)
2003	Momentum	producer	TV film; a.k.a. Momentum – Wenn Gedanken töten können (Germany: DVD title) & a.k.a. Projekt Momentum (Germany)
2003	Devil Winds	executive producer	TV film
2003	I Accuse	executive producer	a.k.a. J'accuse (Canada: French title); TV film
2004	Snakehead Terror	executive producer	TV film
2004	Gargoyle	executive producer	a.k.a. Gargoyles' Revenge (International: English title) & a.k.a. Gargoyle: Wings of Darkness (US: TV title); direct-to-video
2005	Cerberus	producer	TV film
2005	Descent	executive producer	TV film
2005	Crash Landing	executive producer	direct-to-video
2005	Sub Zero	executive producer	direct-to-video
2005	Premonition	executive producer	TV film; a.k.a. The Psychic (US: video title)
2006	Caved In	producer	TV film; a.k.a. Caved In: Prehistoric Terror (US: long title)
2006	Solar Strike	executive producer	TV film; a.k.a. Solar Attack (US: new title)
2006	Not My Life	executive producer	TV film
2006	Dark Storm	executive producer	TV film
2006	Earthstorm	executive producer	TV film
2007	Termination Point	executive producer	TV film
2007	Fire Serpent	executive producer	TV film
2007	Bone Eater	producer	TV film
2008	Loch Ness Terror	executive producer	a.k.a. Beyond Loch Ness (US: TV title)
2008	Ogre	executive producer	TV film
2008	Storm Cell	executive producer	TV film
2008	Poison Ivy: The Secret Society	executive producer	TV film
2008	Sea Beast	executive producer	TV film; a.k.a. Troglodyte (original title)
2008	Ba'al	executive producer	TV film; a.k.a. Ba'al: The Storm God (US: long title)
2008	Trial by Fire	executive producer	TV film
2009	Ratko: The Dictator's Son	executive producer	a.k.a. National Lampoon's Ratko: The Dictator's Son (US: complete title)
2009	Wyvern	executive producer	TV film
2009	Hydra	producer	TV film
2009	Polar Storm	executive producer	TV film
2009	Ice Twisters	executive producer	TV film
2010	Icarus	executive producer	a.k.a. The Killing Machine (working title)
2010	I Spit on Your Grave	producer	
2010	Ice Quake	executive producer	TV film
2010	Mongolian Death Worm	executive producer	TV film
2010	Stonehenge Apocalypse	executive producer	TV film
2010	Goblin	executive producer	TV film
2010	Mandrake	executive producer	TV film
2010	Ice Quake	executive producer	TV film
2011	Behemoth	executive producer	TV film
2011	Iron Invader	executive producer	TV film; a.k.a. Iron Golem (US title) and Metal Shifters (Canada: TV title)
2011	Collision Earth	executive producer	TV film
2011	Doomsday Prophecy	executive producer	TV film
2011	Seeds of Destruction	executive producer	TV film; a.k.a. The Terror Beneath (original title)
2011	Earth's Final Hours	executive producer	TV film
2011	Snowmageddon	executive producer	TV film
2012	Mega Cyclone	executive producer	TV film
2012	The Philadelphia Experiment	executive producer	TV film
2012	Ghost Storm	executive producer	TV film
2012	The 12 Disasters of Christmas	executive producer	TV film; a.k.a. The 12 Disasters (US: TV title)
2013	End of the World	executive producer	TV film
2013	Independence Daysaster	executive producer	TV film
2013	I Spit on Your Grave 2	producer, production manager, & assistant director	
2013	Embrace of the Vampire	executive producer	direct-to-video
2013	Grave Halloween	executive producer	
2014	Zodiac: Signs of the Apocalypse	executive producer	TV film
2014	Christmas Icetastrophe	executive producer	TV film
2015	Earthfall	executive producer	direct-to-video
2015	LA Apocalypse	executive producer	direct-to-video
2015	Lavalantula	executive producer	TV film
2015	I Spit on Your Grave III: Vengeance Is Mine	executive producer	
2015	Stormageddon	executive producer	
2016	Drone Wars	executive producer	
2016	Dam Sharks	executive producer	TV film
2016	2 Lava 2 Lantula!	producer	TV film
2016	Earthtastrophe	executive producer	TV film
2016	Shadows of the Dead	producer	TV film
2016	Mind Blown	executive producer	TV film
2017	Global Meltdown	executive producer	TV film
2017	Pandora's Box	executive producer	TV film; a.k.a. Doomsday Device (original title)
2017	Truth or Dare	producer	TV film
2018	Karma	producer	TV film
2019	Kill Chain	producer	
