= Jay Arlen Jones =

American film and television actor (1954–2023)

Jay Arlen Jones (March 8, 1954 – February 28, 2023) was an American film and television actor. Born in Los Angeles, California, he was active from the early 1980s. His most recognized role is that of Occam, the African-American slave enlisted as a Patriot fighter by his master, in the Revolutionary War epic The Patriot (2000). After portraying Leon in Eight Legged Freaks (2002), he participated in the short film Nines and the television film The Least Among You (2009). Jones died on February 28, 2023, at the age of 68.

== Filmography ==
=== Films ===
Year	Film	Role	Director	Notes
1986	Club Life	Black Punk	Norman Thaddeus Vane	
1986	Night of the Creeps	Cop at Police Station	Fred Dekker	
1987	No Way Out	Marine Guard #1	Roger Donaldson	
1987	You Talkin' to Me?	Actor #1	Charles Winkler	
1988	Twins	Mover #1	Ivan Reitman	
1989	Satan's Princess	Black Romeo	Bert I. Gordon	Credited as J. Arlen Jones
1990	Vital Signs	Paramedic	Marisa Silver	
1993	Extreme Justice	Nash	Mark L. Lester	
1993	Relentless 3	Angry Man	James Lemmo	Direct-to-video release
1999	Life	Bagman	Ted Demme	
1999	A Texas Funeral	Otis	William Blake Herron	
2000	The Patriot	Occam	Roland Emmerich	
2000	The Secret	Jerry	Virginie Wagon	
2000	The Big Thing	James	Aleks Horvat	
2001	Carman: The Champion	Johnny	Lee Stanley	
2002	Eight Legged Freaks	Leon	Ellory Elkayem	
2003	Nines	Happy	Adrian Fulle	Short film
2009	The Least Among You	Jojo	Mark Young	Direct-to-video release

=== Television ===
Year(s)	Title	Role(s)	Notes
1981	CHiPs	Biker	S4E15 "Ponch's Angels: Part 2"
1983	Dynasty	Desk Clerk #1	S3E23 "The Threat"
1983	The Yellow Rose		S1E10 "Only the Proud"
1985	Scarecrow and Mrs. King	Estoccian Assassin	S3E11 "The Wrong Way Home"
1985	Trapper John, M.D.	Workman #2	S7E9 "Billboard Barney"
1986	Space Baby	Dumping Jack Trash	Television special. Credited as Jay Arlin Jones
1986–1989	L.A. Law	Cop #2; Cop #1	S1E10 "Fry Me to the Moon"; S3E11 "Izzy Ackerman or Is He Not"
1987	Knots Landing	Bank Teller	S8E20 "A Plan of Action"
1987	Dallas		S10E25 "War and Peace"
1987	Max Headroom		S1E3 "Body Banks"
1988	Houston Knights	Jason Culpepper	S3E11 "The Wrong Way Home"
1988	The Diamond Trap	Cop	TV movie
1989	Tour of Duty		S2E11 "Promised Land"
1989	CBS Summer Playhouse		S3E2 "B-Men"
1989	Open House	The Internist	S1E7 "Let's Get Physicals"
1990	Mancuso, F.B.I.	Medic	S1E11 "Shall We Gdansk?"
1990	Gabriel's Fire	Trusty	S1E7 "The Neighborhood"
1991	The Flash	Wayne Cotrell	S1E10 "Beat the Clock"
1991	In the Heat of the Night	Ticket Man	S4E20 "Just a Country Boy"
1991	Beverly Hills, 90210	Bartender	S2E10 "Necessity Is a Mother"
1992	Reasonable Doubts	Baker	S1E14 "The Discomfort Zone"; S1E15 "Fish Out of Water"
1994	The Fresh Prince of Bel-Air	Manager	S4E15 "Who's the Boss?"
1994	Sister, Sister	Preacher	S1E6 "The Pimple"
1995	Night Stand with Dick Dietrick	Jimmy	S1E21 "Mistrial of the Century"
1995–1996	Nowhere Man	Inmate; Joe "J.C." Carter; Dr. Novak	S1E1 "Absolute Zero"; S1E22 "Calaway"
1996	Assault on Dome 4	Goon #1	TV movie
1999	Melrose Place	Detective Pavone; Detective Griffith	S7E21 "I Married a Jock Murderer"; S7E35 "Asses to Ashes"
