= Nicholas Mele =

American actor

Nicholas Mele is an American actor who has starred in many movies and on television. His first movie role was in the 1976 movie The Ritz. Other movie roles include Some Kind of Hero (1982) and Young Doctors in Love (1982). His most well-known film role was in the 1988 hit horror movie A Nightmare on Elm Street 4: The Dream Master as Dennis Johnson. A year later, he reprised his role in the hit sequel A Nightmare on Elm Street 5: The Dream Child. His most recent movie is the 2003 film The Great Gabble.

Mele has made guest appearances in many television series, including The White Shadow, Cagney and Lacey, Melrose Place and NYPD Blue.

== Filmography ==
- 1976 The Ritz as Taxi Driver (uncredited)
- 1977 The Goodbye Girl as Richard III Cast
- 1979 10
- 1980 Wholly Moses as Israeli Photographer
- 1981 All Night Long as Shoplifter
- 1981 Mommie Dearest as Assistant Director #2
- 1982 Some Kind of Hero as Officer
- 1982 Young Doctors in Love as Jerry, The Gangster
- 1984 The Lonely Guy as Maitre D'
- 1984 Unfaithfully Yours as Waiter
- 1985 Torchlight as Dr. Kameraman
- 1988 A Nightmare on Elm Street 4: The Dream Master as Dennis Johnson
- 1989 A Nightmare on Elm Street 5: The Dream Child as Dennis Johnson
- 1990 Impulse as Rossi
- 1991 Going Under as Wimmer
- 1994 Fast Getaway II as Alejandro Mira
- 1995 The Spy Within as Mailman
- 1996 The Last Days of Frankie the Fly as Race Track Man
- 1996 Pie In the Sky
- 1999 Jimmy Zip as Oliver Sandstrom
- 2001 I Am Sam as Booking Cop
- 2003 The Great Gabble as Gordy Gabble
- 2010 The Sinatra Club as Carlo Gamino
