= Relentless 3 =

- Directed by: James Lemmo
- Written by: James Lemmo
- Produced by: Lisa M. Hansen (producer); Paul Hertzberg (producer); Catalaine Knell (co-producer); Leo Rossi (co-producer)
- Starring: Leo Rossi; William Forsythe
- Cinematography: Jacques Haitkin
- Music by: Scott Grusin
- Production company: CineTel Films
- Distributed by: New Line Cinema
- Release date: August 18, 1993
- Running time: 93 minutes
- Country: United States
- Language: English

Relentless 3 is a 1993 crime thriller film written and directed by James Lemmo. The tagline for the film was: "When the fear stops...you're dead!" Relentless 3 was filmed in Los Angeles, California, USA. It is the third installment in the Relentless series.

The film was referenced twice on Saturday Night Live. The first time in 1993 on the Jeff Goldblum, Aerosmith #19.3 episode as a poster on the counter in "Karl’s Video Store" and again on The Best of David Spade in 1995, again a poster on the counter in the same store.

== Plot ==
Sam Dietz returns to Los Angeles from "up North" and agrees to consult on a serial killer case. Not wanting to be more involved changes however, when the killer targets Dietz's latest love interest, thereby, forcing him to become actively involved in the investigation. The killer is someone he's arrested before.

== Cast ==
- Leo Rossi as Sam Dietz
- William Forsythe as Walter Hilderman
- Robert Costanzo as Roy Kalewsky
- Edward Wiley as Lieutenant Muldowney
- Tom Bower as Captain Phelan
- Savannah Smith Boucher as Marianne
- Stacy Edwards as Toni Keely
- Mindy Seeger as Francine
- George Tovar as Detective Santos
- Jack Knight as Detective Schulte
- Felton Perry as Detective Ziskie
- Charles Dennis as Detective Cirrillo
- Signy Coleman as Paula
- Diane Rodrigues as Angry Woman
- Jay Arlen Jones as Angry Man
- Brendan Ryan as Corey Dietz

== Home media ==
The film was released directly to videocassette on August 18, 1993. In 2006, Image Entertainment released a double feature DVD containing this and the fourth film. Both films are presented in widescreen.

== Other films in the series ==
- Relentless (1989)
- Dead On: Relentless II (1992)
- Relentless IV: Ashes to Ashes (1994)
