= We're Talking Serious Money =

We're Talkin' Serious Money
- Video cover
- Directed by: James Lemmo
- Written by: James Lemmo; Leo Rossi
- Produced by: Lisa M. Hansen; Paul Hertzberg; Catalaine Knell; Guy J. Louthan; Leo Rossi; Harold Welb
- Starring: Dennis Farina; Leo Rossi; Fran Drescher; John LaMotta
- Cinematography: Jacques Haitkin
- Release date: October 1992 (American Film Market)
- Running time: 104 minutes
- Country: United States
- Language: English

We're Talkin' Serious Money (1992), also known as Serious Money, is an action comedy film directed by James Lemmo. He also co-wrote the screenplay with Leo Rossi, who also stars in the film. Cinematography by Jacques Haitkin. It also stars: Dennis Farina, Fran Drescher, John LaMotta, Peter Iacangelo. It was produced by: Lisa M. Hansen, Harold Welb, Paul Hertzberg, who makes a small cameo in the film, Catalaine Knell, Guy J. Louthan, co-star Leo Rossi, and Harold Welb. The movie was filmed in Los Angeles, California, and New York City, New York. It was released by Grey Matter Entertainment and CineTel Films in the United States.

== Plot ==
Two misfit men, Sal (Dennis Farina) and his friend Charlie (Leo Rossi), are cheated out of $10,000 that they had borrowed from a Mafia kingpin. They must flee from New York to Los Angeles, only to there get involved in a caper involving a video of Senators in compromising positions. Given a cool million for the video, they are then pursued by the mob and the FBI.

== Cast ==
- Dennis Farina as Sal
- Leo Rossi as Charlie
- Fran Drescher as Valerie
- Cynthia Frost as Connie
- John LaMotta as Gino "The Grocer"
- Peter Iacangelo as Frankie "The Beast"
- Anthony Powers as Joey "Eggs"
- Lou Bonacki as Cop #1
- John Cade as Cop #2
- Catherine Paolone as Rosemarie
- Robert Costanzo as Michael
- Denis Arndt as Jacubick
- John Josef Spencer as Rosemarie's Son
- Maria Cavaiani as Rosemarie's Daughter
- Len Pera as Goon Behind The Counter
- Donna Hardy as Old Lady (credited as Dona Hardy)

== Production credits ==
- James Lemmo - Director / Screenwriter
- Lisa Hansen – Producer
- Paul Hertzberg – Producer
- Catalaine Knell – Producer
- Guy J. Louthan – Producer
- Leo Rossi - Screenwriter / Producer
- Harold Welb – Producer
- Jacques Haitkin – Cinematographer
- Steve Nevius – Editor
- Susan Benjamin - Art Director
- Tom McKinley - Costume Designer

== Availability ==
The movie was released on videocassette in 1992 by Columbia TriStar Home Video. The movie has never been released on DVD, and as of December 26, 2009, Sony Pictures Home Entertainment has not yet announced any plans for a DVD release.
