= Stonehenge Apocalypse =

- DVD cover
- Genre: Science fiction
- Written by: Brad Abraham and Paul Ziller
- Directed by: Paul Ziller
- Starring: Misha Collins; Torri Higginson; Peter Wingfield
- Music by: Michael Neilson
- Country of origin: Canada
- Original language: English

Production
- Executive producers: Josée Bernard; Tom Berry; Lisa M. Hansen; Paul Hertzberg
- Producer: John Prince
- Cinematography: Anthony C. Metchie
- Editor: Christopher A. Smith
- Production companies: CineTel Films; Reel One Entertainment; Corus Entertainment; Movie Central; The Movie Network; Syfy; Super Écran

Original release
- Network: Syfy
- Release: June 12, 2010

Stonehenge Apocalypse is a 2010 Canadian made-for-TV science fiction film starring Misha Collins, Torri Higginson and Peter Wingfield. The movie follows a series of deaths, natural disasters, and strange energy readings that seem to be mysteriously connected to Stonehenge.

== Plot ==
An ancient prophecy comes to pass when archaeologists unearth an Egyptian chamber 10,000 feet below ground in Maine USA, sparking a devastating electromagnetic pulse that triggers Stonehenge and, in turn, sends destructive shockwaves around the globe.

When the Aztec pyramids crumble and the stones take on a life of their own, a renegade radio host, a team of scientists, and a team of British commandos race to prevent the same force responsible for creating life on Earth from cleansing the planet in order to herald the dawn of a new age.

Dr. Jacob Glaser, a scientist once regarded as a prodigy, but now considered a conspiracy theorist, stumbles upon the first electromagnetic pulses erupting from Stonehenge and ends up working with Dr. Kaycee Leeds and the reluctant British team to stop the destruction. Despite their reluctance to work with Glaser due to his background, the team eventually comes around to accept his theories on the underground electromagnetic fields after massive volcanic eruptions in Java and from the Giza pyramid complex.

They discover an ancient artifact that can be used to disable Stonehenge and stop the destruction of the earth, now kept in a museum, but it is intercepted by Glaser's colleague Joseph LeShem, who is amassing a cult to wait out the apocalypse in a temple that arises from the ground in Maine. Glaser retrieves the mechanism after Joseph is killed by the British military, but they plan on nuking Stonehenge before he can deactivate it.

Glaser and Leeds manage to convince the military to let them return to Stonehenge with the mechanism, but due to injuries sustained in the fight with LeShem, Leeds is sent to the hospital instead. Back in England, Glaser struggles with John Trousdale, who has taken the artifact in the name of LeShem's cult, but somehow Glaser overwhelms him and activates the device right before the nuke lands, ending all seismic activity and evaporating the nuke along with Glaser and Trousdale.

Kaycee Leeds is later seen reading a newspaper casting doubt on Glaser's actions. She goes on to start her own conspiracy theory radio show.

== Cast ==
- Misha Collins as Dr. Jacob Glaser, a once-renowned astrophysicist, now written off as a crazed conspiracy theorist by most of the scientific community (possibly because he believes metal can be radio-carbon dated). He runs a radio show called The Real Story in which he discusses unexplained phenomena with his listeners
- Torri Higginson as Dr. Kaycee Leeds
- Peter Wingfield as Dr. John Trousdale
- Hill Harper as Dr. Joseph LeShem, a former friend and colleague of Dr. Glaser's, discoverer of the chamber in Maine

== Reception ==
Stonehenge Apocalypse drew 2.1 million viewers during its premiere. The film was described as "preposterous" in a Dread Central review that gave it 2.5 out of 5 stars.
