= Michael Lerner (actor) =

American actor (1941–2023)

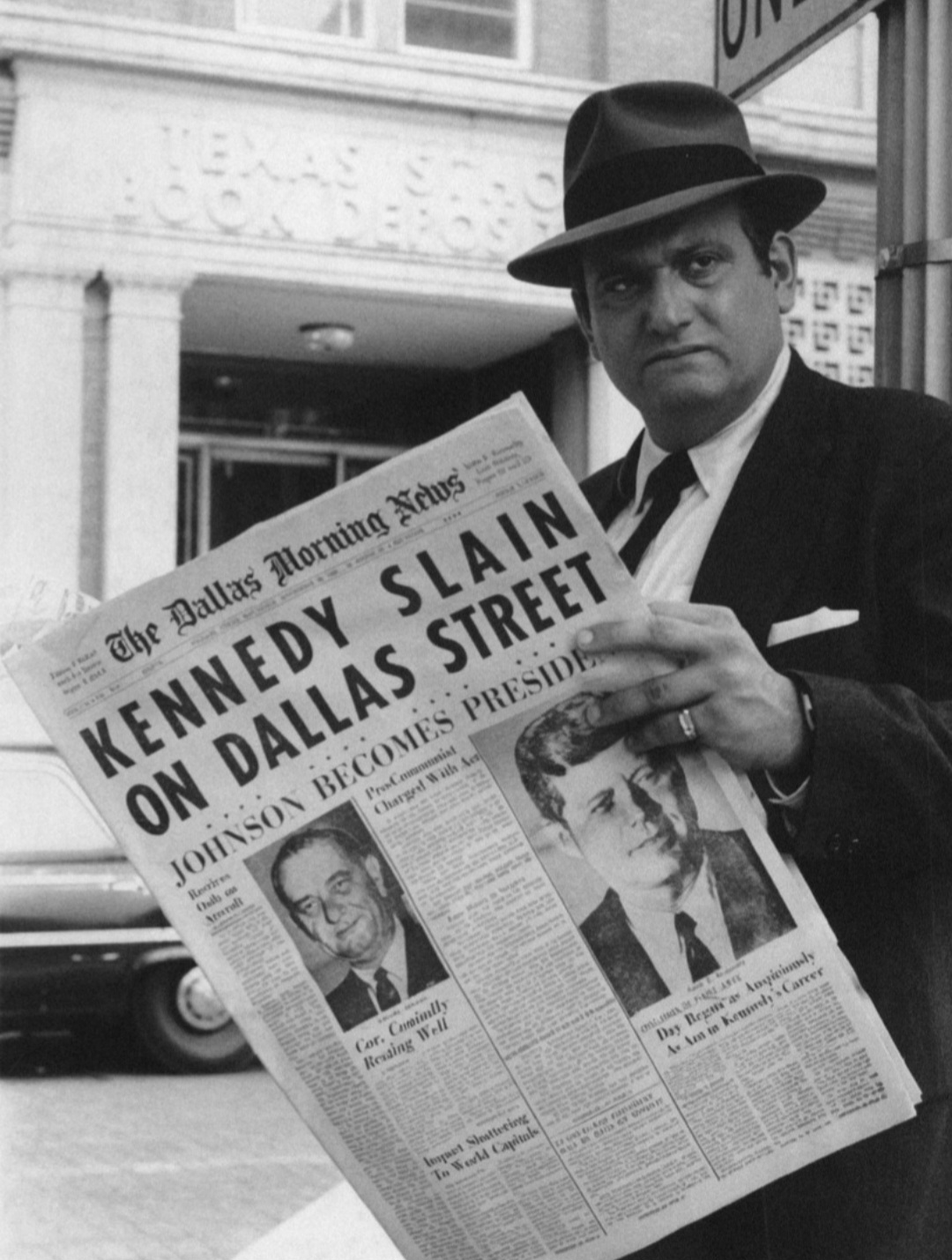
- Lerner in Ruby and Oswald, 1978
- Born: Michael Charles Lerner; June 22, 1941; Brooklyn, New York, U.S.
- Died: April 8, 2023 (aged 81); Burbank, California, U.S.
- Resting place: Hollywood Forever Cemetery
- Education: London Academy of Music and Dramatic Art
- Occupation: Actor
- Years active: 1954–2019
- Relatives: Ken Lerner (brother); Sam Lerner (nephew)

Michael Charles Lerner (June 22, 1941 – April 8, 2023) was an American actor. He was nominated for the Academy Award for Best Supporting Actor for his role as Jack Lipnick in Barton Fink (1991). Lerner also played Arnold Rothstein in Eight Men Out (1988), Bugsy Calhoune in Harlem Nights (1989), Phil Gillman in Amos & Andrew (1993), The Warden in No Escape (1994), Mel Horowitz on the television series Clueless, Jerry Miller in The Beautician and the Beast (1997), Mayor Ebert in Roland Emmerich's Godzilla (1998), Mr. Greenway in Elf (2003), and Senator Brickman in X-Men: Days of Future Past (2014).

== Early life ==
Michael Charles Lerner was born on June 22, 1941, in Brooklyn, New York City, of Romanian-Jewish descent, the second of three sons to Blanche (née Halpern) and George Lerner; according to Lerner, his father "liked to think he was an antiques dealer, but in all actuality he was a junk dealer." He was raised in Red Hook, Brooklyn, and in Solon, Ohio. His younger brother Ken, nephew Sam, and niece Jenny are also actors. His older brother, Arnold, died in 2004.

Lerner attended Lafayette High School, where he acted for the first time, portraying a donkey in a school play. In his teenage years, he worked at a delicatessen in Brighton Beach, owned by his older brother Arnold, which Lerner described as the main source of income by the family.

== Career ==
Lerner made his first television appearance at the age of 13, as a "quiz kid" on a television program hosted by a local sportscaster. He played Willy Loman in a production of Death of a Salesman at Brooklyn College, where Joel Zwick was a classmate. The experience convinced him that he wanted to be an actor, rather than an English professor. He also appeared as Sir Toby Belch in a production of Twelfth Night directed by David Mamet in Greenwich Village; William H. Macy was also in that production. After graduating from Brooklyn College, where he studied acting, he received a scholarship to the University of California, Berkeley, where he earned a master's degree in English drama. Although his then-wife still thought he should become an English professor, Lerner still wanted to be an actor; he received a Fulbright Scholarship to study theater at the London Academy of Music and Dramatic Art for two years. While in London, he lived in a flat with Yoko Ono, before her marriage to John Lennon. In 1968, he appeared in Ono's short experimental film Smile, among other projects. "She made a movie comprised of bare asses walking on a treadmill", he once said. "I’m in it and so is Paul McCartney. Plus I’m doing narration about censorship and all that crap."

Upon returning to the United States, Lerner worked at several delicatessen shops in New York City, regularly getting fired and losing a portion of one index finger in a work accident. In 1968, Lerner returned to the San Francisco Bay Area and joined the American Conservatory Theater (A.C.T.). He taught at San Francisco State University for a year. At the age of 24 he appeared as "Hieronymous the Miser" in a KPFA radio production of Michel de Ghelderode's Breugelesque play, Red Magic.

Lerner moved to Los Angeles in 1969, where he appeared in a production of Little Murders, a play by Jules Feiffer that was later adapted into a film by Alan Arkin. He also began making guest appearances in television shows such as The Brady Bunch, The Odd Couple, M*A*S*H, Banacek and The Rockford Files. In 1969, Lerner appeared on The Doris Day Show, season two episode nine entitled “Singles Only”. In 1974, he appeared in the teleplay The Missiles of October, playing Pierre Salinger.

In 1970, Lerner made his film debut in Alex in Wonderland; director Paul Mazursky had seen his production of Little Murders and enjoyed his performance. He then went on to appear in supporting roles in various Hollywood movies such as The Candidate, St. Ives and the 1981 remake of The Postman Always Rings Twice. In 1991, after co-starring in Harlem Nights, Lerner played film producer Jack Lipnick in Barton Fink, for which he received an Academy Award nomination for Best Supporting Actor. He based the character in part on legendary film mogul Louis B. Mayer; according to his brother Ken, he was working on a screenplay about Mayer when he died.

From 1996 to 1997, Lerner played Mel Horowitz on the television series Clueless. In 1997, he would play Joy Miller's father Jerry in The Beautician and the Beast. In 1998, Lerner portrayed Dr. Lupus in Celebrity, later panning the movie as a "piece of shit" due to conflicts with director and co-star Woody Allen. By 1999, Lerner acknowledged that he was primarily seen as a character actor. Lerner's later projects include the Christmas comedy Elf (2003) and Poster Boy (2004), as well as television programs such as Law & Order: Special Victims Unit and Entourage.

In 2002, he appeared in the West End production of Up for Grabs with Madonna. He also appeared on BBC Radio Four in 2008 as a member of the cast of David Quantick's Radio Four's series One. He portrayed Senator Brickman in the Marvel Comics/Twentieth Century Fox film, X-Men: Days of Future Past (2014). In 2013, Lerner appeared in a Season 4 episode of Glee as Sidney Greene, an investor in the revival of Broadway musical Funny Girl. His character is on the panel of judges, watching the Rachel Berry character audition for the lead role. He reprised his role as Sidney in Season 5 in several New York-based episodes of the series, as Funny Girl opens on Broadway.

== Personal life ==
In addition to his acting career, Lerner was a collector of rare books, an aficionado of Cuban cigars, and—by his own account—a very good poker player. Throughout the 1990s and 2000s, he was in a relationship with actress Diane Baker. Lerner stated that he was briefly married before receiving his Fulbright Scholarship, but that the marriage was not recorded as it was annulled shortly after.

=== Death ===
Lerner died at a hospital in Burbank, California, on April 8, 2023, at the age of 81. His brother Ken attributed Lerner's cause of death to complications with brain seizures he experienced in November 2022.

== Selected filmography ==
=== Films ===
Michael Lerner film credits
Year	Title	Role	Notes
1968	Smile		Short experimental film directed by Yoko Ono
1970	Alex in Wonderland	Leo	
1971	The Ski Bum	Rod	
1972	The Candidate	Paul Corliss	
1974	Busting	Marvin Royce	
1974	Newman's Law	Frank Acker	
1974	Hangup	Fred Richards	
1976	St. Ives	Myron Green	
1977	The Other Side of Midnight	Barbet	
1977	Outlaw Blues	Hatch	
1979	Goldengirl	Sternberg	
1980	The Baltimore Bullet	Paulie	
1980	Coast to Coast	Dr. Frederick Froll	
1980	Borderline	Henry Lydell	
1981	The Postman Always Rings Twice	Mr. Katz	
1981	Threshold	Henry de Vici	
1982	National Lampoon's Class Reunion	Dr. Robert Young	
1983	Strange Invaders	Willie Collings	
1985	Movers & Shakers	Arnie	
1987	Anguish	John Pressman	
1988	Vibes	Burt Wilder	
1988	Eight Men Out	Arnold Rothstein	
1989	Harlem Nights	Bugsy Calhoune	
1990	Maniac Cop 2	Deputy Commissioner Edward Doyle	
1990	Any Man's Death	Herb Denner	
1991	Omen IV: The Awakening	Earl Knight	
1991	Barton Fink	Jack Lipnick	Los Angeles Film Critics Association Award for Best Supporting Actor; Nominated—Academy Award for Best Supporting Actor; Nominated—Chicago Film Critics Association Award for Best Supporting Actor
1992	Newsies	Weasel	
1992	The Comrades of Summer	George	
1993	Amos & Andrew	Phil Gillman	
1994	Blank Check	Biderman	
1994	Radioland Murders	Lieutenant Cross	
1994	The Road to Wellville	Goodloe Bender	
1994	No Escape	The Warden	
1995	No Way Back	Frank Serlano	
1995	A Pyromaniac's Love Story	Perry	
1995	Girl in the Cadillac	Pal	
1997	The Beautician and the Beast	Jerry Miller	
1997	For Richer or Poorer	Phillip Kleinman	
1998	Godzilla	Mayor Ebert	
1998	Safe Men	Big Fat Bernie Gayle	
1998	Celebrity	Dr. Lupus	
1998	Tale of the Mummy	Professor Marcus	
1998	Desperation Boulevard	Manny Green	
1999	The Mod Squad	Howard	
1999	My Favorite Martian	Mr. Channing	
2001	Mockingbird Don't Sing	Dr. Stan York	
2002	101 Dalmatians II: Patch's London Adventure	Producer	Voice
2003	Elf	Mr. Greenway	
2004	The Calcium Kid	Artie Cohen	
2004	Larceny	Pete	
2004	Poster Boy	Jack Kray	
2005	When Do We Eat?	Ira Stuckman	
2006	Love and Other Disasters	Marvin Bernstein	
2006	Art School Confidential	Art Dealer	
2006	The Last Time	Leguzza	
2007	A Dennis the Menace Christmas	Mr. Souse	
2007	Slipstream	Big Mikey	
2008	Yonkers Joe	Stanley	
2009	A Serious Man	Solomon Schlutz	
2009	Life During Wartime	Harvey Wiener	
2010	Pete Smalls Is Dead	Leonard Proval	
2010	Wax On, F*ck Off	Cy Rosenthal	Short film
2011	Atlas Shrugged: Part I	Wesley Mouch	
2012	Mirror Mirror	Baron	
2014	X-Men: Days of Future Past	Senator Brickman	
2015	Ashby	Entwhistle	
2019	Frankenstein's Monster's Monster, Frankenstein	Bobby Fox	Final performance before death

=== Television ===
Michael Lerner television credits
Year	Title	Role	Notes
1963	Dr. Kildare	Dr. Brown	1 episode
1969	The Good Guys	Arthur	2 episodes
1969	Three's a Crowd	Sid Bagby	TV movie
1969	The Brady Bunch	Johnny	1 episode
1970	The Young Lawyers	Anthony Maroni	1 episode
1970	The Doris Day Show	Mr. Murray	2 episodes
1971	That Girl	Charlie	1 episode
1971	The D.A.	Mark Warren	1 episode
1971	What's a Nice Girl Like You...?	Fats Detroit	TV movie
1972	The Bold Ones: The New Doctors	Jack Watson	1 episode
1972	Ironside	Adrian Father	1 episode
1972	Night Gallery	Dr. Burgess	1 episode
1972	The Delphi Bureau	Cy Turrell	1 episode
1972	Banacek	Bartender	1 episode
1972	The Streets of San Francisco	Lou Watkins	1 episode
1973	Bob & Carol & Ted & Alice	Dr. Nasserman	1 episode
1973	Firehouse	Ernie Bush	TV movie
1973	The Bob Newhart Show	Mr. Carolla	1 episode
1973	Emergency!	Martin Noble	1 episode
1973	Love Story	Lou Graham	1 episode
1973	The New Perry Mason	Derek Stocker	1 episode
1974	M*A*S*H	Captain Bernie Futterman	1 episode
1974	The Rockford Files	Dr. Ruben Steelman	1 episode
1974	The Rockford Files	Arnold Love	2 episodes
1974	Love, American Style	Karatz	1 episode
1974	Chase	Cupid	1 episode
1974	The Odd Couple	Sgt. Chomsky	1 episode
1974	Reflections of Murder	Jerry Steele	TV movie
1974	The Missiles of October	Pierre Salinger	TV movie
1975	Sarah T. – Portrait of a Teenage Alcoholic	Dr. Marvin Kittredge	TV movie
1975	The Dream Makers	Mike	TV movie
1975	A Cry for Help	Philip Conover	TV movie
1975	Starsky & Hutch	Fat Rolly	2 episodes
1975	Lucas Tanner	Artie	1 episode
1975	Rhoda	Ralph Bentley	1 episode
1976	Jigsaw John	Arthur Devore	1 episode
1976	Harry O	Wilt Kane	1 episode
1976	Police Woman	Guidera	1 episode
1976	The Rockford Files	Murray Rosner	1 episode
1978	Ruby and Oswald	Jack Ruby	TV movie
1978	Kojak	Dr. Samuel Fine	1 episode
1978	Vegas	Nate Stephenson - pilot episode: 'High Roller'	1 episode
1978	Wonder Woman	Ashton Ripley	1 episode
1979	Hart to Hart	Poker Player	1 episode
1980	Barnaby Jones	Albert Kruger	
1980	This Year's Blonde	Jack L. Warner	TV movie
1982	Hart to Hart	Art Radner	1 episode
1983	Hill Street Blues	Rollie Simone	4 episodes
1983	Blood Feud	Eddie Cheyfitz	TV movie
1983	Rita Hayworth: The Love Goddess	Harry Cohn	TV movie
1985	Hollywood Beat	Pilot	Pilot episode
1985	MacGyver	Gantner	Pilot episode
1985	The A-Team	Jerry	1 episode
1987	Amazing Stories	Mr. Marvin	1 episode
1987	Hands of a Stranger	Capt. Cirrillo	TV movie
1987	The King of Love	Nat Goldberg	TV movie
1988	Great Performances	Oscar Hammerstein	1 episode
1988	The Equalizer	Amar	Episode: "No Place Like Home"
1991	Omen IV: The Awakening	Earl Knight	TV movie
1992	The Comrades of Summer	George	TV movie
1993	Tales from the Crypt	Mr. Byrd	1 episode
1995	Picture Windows	Maestro	1 episode
1995	Courthouse	Judge Myron Winkleman	11 episodes
1996–1997	Clueless	Mel Horowitz	18 episodes
1998–1999	Godzilla: The Series	Mayor Ebert	Voice, 3 episodes
2000	Murder at the Cannes Film Festival	Morrie Borelli	TV movie
2001	Third Watch	Seymour Morgenstern	1 episode
2003–2006	Law & Order: Special Victims Unit	Morty Berger	2 episodes
2004	Kingdom Hospital	Sheldon Fleischer	3 episodes
2007	Entourage	Joe Roberts	1 episode
2008	Dirty Sexy Money	Martin	1 episode
2009	Saving Grace	Rebbe Jory Quecksilber	1 episode
2010	The Bannen Way	The Mensch	Web series; 16 episodes
2012	The Good Wife	Judge Dwight Sobel	1 episode
2012	Suburgatory	Aaron Laynberg	1 episode
2013–2014	Glee	Sidney Greene	5 episodes
2015	Comedy Bang! Bang!	Darren Schlepping	1 episode
2015	Childrens Hospital	Pop	1 episode
2016	Maron	Ralph	1 episode
