= Dead On: Relentless II =

- Directed by: Michael Schroeder
- Written by: Mark Sevi
- Produced by: Paul Hertzberg (executive producer); Lisa M. Hansen; Stu Segall
- Starring: Ray Sharkey; Leo Rossi; Meg Foster
- Cinematography: Jamie Thompson
- Edited by: Alan Baumgarten
- Music by: Paul F. Antonelli
- Distributed by: CineTel Films
- Release date: February 26, 1992
- Running time: 93 minutes
- Country: United States
- Language: English

Dead On: Relentless II is a 1992 thriller film directed by Michael Schroeder. The tagline for the movie was: The first killer was unpredictable. This one is unstoppable. The movie was filmed in Los Angeles, California. It is the second installment in the Relentless series.

== Plot ==
L.A. Detective Sam Dietz (Leo Rossi), struggling to emotionally survive his previous big case (the first Relentless film) is unwillingly paired with a shady FBI agent Kyle Valsone (Ray Sharkey), during a case tracking another serial killer (Miles O'Keeffe), who kills seemingly at random. But every time Dietz gets a lead, Valsone gets in the way and somewhat throws off the investigation. Suspecting more than meets the eye, Dietz goes around the law to learn the identity of the killer and find out what Valsone is hiding and his connection to the killer. Meanwhile, Dietz's wife Carol (a returning Meg Foster), now estranged from him due to his long hours, tries to deal with her current situation and their uncertain future.

== Cast ==
- Ray Sharkey as Kyle Valsone
- Leo Rossi as Sam Dietz
- Meg Foster as Carol Dietz
- Marc Poppel as Paul Taglia
- Dale Dye as Captain Rivers
- Miles O'Keeffe as Gregor
- Allan Rich as Grazinsky
- Cylk Cozart as detective at precinct
- Art Kimbro as Henry
- Sven-Ole Thorsen as Mechanic (Patrick Vergano)
- Dawn Mangrum as reporter
- Leilani Jones as Belinda Belos
- Frank Rossi as cop at Mechanic's apartment
- Mindy Seeger as Francine
- Barbara Anne Klein as the realtor
- Perry Lang as Ralph Boshi

== Other films in the series ==
- Relentless (1989)
- Relentless 3 (1993)
- Relentless IV: Ashes to Ashes (1994)
