= The Settlement (1999 film) =

- Release poster
- Directed by: Mark Steilen
- Screenplay by: Mark Steilen; Lawrence H. Toffler
- Based on: Death Benefits by Lawrence H. Toffler
- Produced by: Todd Hoffman; John Kuyper; Executive producers: John Davis; Paul Hertzberg; Charles "Skip" Yazel; Richard L. Schnakenberg
- Starring: John C. Reilly; William Fichtner; Kelly McGillis
- Cinematography: Judy Irola, ASC
- Edited by: Fabienne Rowley
- Music by: Brian Tyler
- Production companies: CineTel Films; Davis Entertainment; Dogmsile Pictures; JeanRoy Entertainment
- Distributed by: Bedford Entertainment
- Release date: April 1999
- Running time: 101 minutes
- Country: United States
- Language: English

The Settlement is a 1999 film directed by Mark Steilen, starring John C. Reilly, William Fichtner, and Kelly McGillis. The film was screened at the Los Angeles Independent Film Festival in April 1999.

== Plot summary ==
Pat (John C. Reilly) and Jerry (William Fichtner) work on the fringes of the insurance industry in what are called "viatical settlements," which allow terminal patients the option of cashing in their life insurance policies before death for a reduced payment. In the 1980s, with AIDS cutting short what might have been long and healthy lives, business is booming for Pat and Jerry's firm, Viable Settlements, Inc. But a few years later, improved treatments are keeping the terminally ill alive much longer – and that's bad news for Viable Settlements, which is now on the brink of bankruptcy. When Pat and Jerry meet the beautiful and mysterious Barbara (Kelly McGillis), no one's sure if she's good or bad news.

== Cast ==
- John C. Reilly as Pat
- William Fichtner as Jerry
- Kelly McGillis as Fake Barbara / Ellie
- David Rasche as Denny
- Dan Castellaneta as Neal
