= Hot Tomorrows =

- Directed by: Martin Brest
- Produced by: Martin Brest
- Starring: Ken Lerner; Ray Sharkey; Hervé Villechaize; Victor Argo
- Cinematography: Jacques Haitkin
- Edited by: Martin Brest
- Production company: American Film Institute
- Release date: 1977
- Running time: 72 minutes
- Country: United States
- Language: English

Hot Tomorrows is a 1977 feature-length student film, written and directed by Martin Brest. The film includes appearances from actor Hervé Villechaize and the theatre troupe The Mystic Knights of the Oingo Boingo. Orson Welles provides the voice for a radio ad for a funeral home.

Filming was completed in December 1975 by the then 24 year-old Brest while a student at the American Film Institute, however it took an additional two years to raise funds required to complete post-production, for a total final budget of $33,000.

The Washington Post described Hot Tomorrows as "one of the most original and exciting movies of the decade."

== Plot ==
A young New York City writer who has moved to Los Angeles spends his days exploring his obsession with death.

== Cast ==
- Ken Lerner as Michael
- Ray Sharkey as Louis
- Hervé Villechaize as Albert
- Victor Argo as Tony
- George Memmoli as Man in Mortuary
- Donne Daniels as Night Embalmer
- Dr. Rose Marshall as Tante Ethel
- Paul Schumacher as Lecturer
- Stan Laurel as himself
- Oliver Hardy as himself
- Marie Elfman as Singer
- Danny Elfman as Singer
- Dennis Madden as Bartender
- Sandra Lowell as Polly
- Marion Beeler as Waitress
- Shelby Leverington as Hospital Receptionist
- David Garfield as Doctor Stern
- Vince Palmieri as Man in Car
- Janet Brandt as Old Woman at Bus Stop
- Sonya Berman as Old Woman watching TV
- Esther Cohen as Old Woman with Postcard
- Edith Gwinn as Old Woman in Supermarket, Hospital, and Mortuary
- Orson Welles as the Voice of Parklawn Mortuary
