= Jacques Haitkin =

American cinematographer (1950–2023)

- Born: Jacques Adam Haitkin; August 29, 1950; Brooklyn, New York, U.S.
- Died: March 21, 2023 (aged 72); San Francisco, California, U.S.
- Other names: Jacques Haitken
- Occupation: Cinematographer
- Years active: 1972–2023
- Notable work: A Nightmare on Elm Street

Jacques Adam Haitkin (August 29, 1950 – March 21, 2023) was an American cinematographer. He was best known as the cinematographer for Wes Craven's slasher film A Nightmare on Elm Street.

Haitkin studied at the film school of New York University and American Film Institute, and graduated in 1975. He was well-known mainly as a horror film cinematographer, especially on films by Craven and Jack Sholder.

He also worked as additional or second unit director of photography on The Expendables, X-Men: First Class, X-Men: The Last Stand, Furious 7, Teenage Mutant Ninja Turtles: Out of the Shadows, Captain America: Civil War, Kong: Skull Island and The Fate of the Furious.

Haitkin died at his assisted living community in Portola Gardens in San Francisco, California, on March 21, 2023, at the age of 72. He died from complications related to ALS and leukemia.

== Filmography ==
- Hot Dogs for Gauguin (1972)
- Hot Tomorrows (1977)
- They Went That-A-Way & That-A-Way (1978)
- The Prize Fighter (1979)
- The Hitter (1979)
- The Private Eyes (1980)
- The Girl, the Gold Watch & Everything (1980)
- St. Helens (1981)
- Galaxy of Terror (1981)
- The House Where Evil Dwells (1982)
- Last Plane Out (1983)
- Making the Grade (1984)
- A Nightmare on Elm Street (1984)
- The Lost Empire (1984)
- A Nightmare on Elm Street 2: Freddy's Revenge (1985)
- Quiet Cool (1986)
- The Imagemaker (1986)
- The Hidden (1987)
- Cherry 2000 (1988)
- To Die For (1989)
- Cage (1989)
- Shocker (1989)
- The Ambulance (1990)
- Buried Alive (1990)
- Fast Getaway (1991)
- We're Talking Serious Money (1991)
- Mom and Dad Save the World (1992)
- Maniac Cop III: Badge of Silence (1992)
- Relentless 3 (1993)
- The Silence of the Hams (1994)
- Scanner Cop (1994)
- The Force (1994)
- Evolver (1995)
- Fist of the North Star (1995)
- Bloodsport II: The Next Kumite (1996)
- Buried Alive II (1997)
- Wishmaster (1997)
- Team Knight Rider (1997–1998) TV series, 14 episodes
- The Last Man on Planet Earth (1999)
- The Base (1999)
- The Apartment Complex (1999)
- The Chaos Factor (2000)
- Blowback (2000)
- Son of the Beach (2000) TV series, 3 episodes
- Faust: Love of the Damned (2000)
- Rocket's Red Glare (2000)
- A Month of Sundays (2001)
- Storm Watch (2002)
- Bad Karma (2002)
- Shut Up and Kiss Me (2004)
- Art Heist (2004)
- 12 Days of Terror (2004)
- The Curse of El Charro (2005)
- The Haunting Hour: Don't Think About It (2007)
- Clean Break (2008) also story
