= Maniac Cop 2 =

1990 American slasher film directed by William Lustig

- Promotional poster
- Directed by: William Lustig
- Written by: Larry Cohen
- Produced by: Larry Cohen
- Starring: Robert Davi; Claudia Christian; Michael Lerner; Bruce Campbell; Laurene Landon; Robert Z'Dar; Clarence Williams III; Leo Rossi
- Cinematography: James Lemmo
- Edited by: David Kern
- Music by: Jay Chattaway
- Production companies: Fadd Enterprises; Medusa Pictures; The Movie House Sales Company; Overseas FilmGroup
- Distributed by: Live Home Video
- Release date: December 13, 1990
- Running time: 88 minutes
- Country: United States
- Language: English

Maniac Cop 2 is a 1990 American slasher film directed by William Lustig and written by Larry Cohen. It is a sequel to Maniac Cop (1988) and is the second installment in the Maniac Cop film series. It stars Robert Davi, Claudia Christian, Michael Lerner, and Bruce Campbell, with Robert Z'Dar returning as Matthew Cordell, an undead police officer-turned-serial killer following his own murder.

Maniac Cop 2 was released direct-to-video in 1990, and received mixed-to-positive reviews, with many considering it as an improvement over its predecessor. It was followed by Maniac Cop III: Badge of Silence (1993).

== Plot ==
After being impaled by a pipe and plunged into a body of water, the now-undead "Maniac Cop" Matthew Cordell acquires a junked police cruiser and restarts his killing spree through New York City. Finding a convenience store in the middle of a robbery, he kills the clerk; the thief is subsequently killed in a shootout with police. As Cordell stalks the streets, his enemies Officers Jack Forrest and Theresa Mallory are put back on duty by Deputy Commissioner Edward Doyle, who has the two undergo a psychiatric evaluation under Officer Susan Riley. While Jack is content that Cordell is dead, Theresa is convinced that Cordell is still alive and plotting his revenge.

At a newsstand, Jack is fatally stabbed by Cordell. In order to protect the memory of Commissioner Pike, the corrupt official who originally framed Cordell, the police refuse to inform the public of the nature of recent events. This, along with her belief that Cordell is alive and killing, prompts Theresa to appear on a talk show to inform the public about Cordell. A traffic cop is murdered by Cordell later while attempting to tow a man's car. The man who was having his car towed is arrested on suspicion of the cop's murder. While en route to a hotel in a taxi, Theresa is joined by Susan, and the two are attacked by Cordell, who kills the cabbie and forces Susan and Theresa off the road. After handcuffing Susan to the steering wheel of a car and sending her into the busy streets, Cordell kills Theresa by snapping her neck. Gaining control of the car, Susan crashes and is found by authorities.

Elsewhere, a stripper named Cheryl is attacked in her apartment by Steven Turkell, who has strangled at least six other exotic dancers. Cordell arrives, murders two officers whom Cheryl called for, and helps Turkell escape. Turkell befriends Cordell and takes him back to his apartment, where Cordell stays for a short while. After Cordell leaves, Turkell visits a strip club, where he is identified by Cheryl to Susan and Detective Lieutenant Sean McKinney. He is arrested and placed in a holding cell.

Cordell breaks into the police precinct, murders nineteen police officers, and frees Turkell and several unnamed convicts. Using Susan as a hostage, Turkell, Cordell, and another criminal named Joseph Blum hijack a prison bus and head to Sing Sing, where Turkell believes Cordell wants to free all inmates and create an army of criminals. McKinney and Doyle follow, and McKinney convinces Doyle to reopen Cordell's case and rebury his casket with full honors on the assumption that this will appease Cordell.

Cordell gains entry into the prison using Blum's paperwork, and kills a guard for his keys. Shortly after entering death row, Cordell is contacted over the prison PA system by Doyle, who admits to Cordell that he was set up and states that his case has been reopened. After hearing Doyle's announcement, Cordell abandons Turkell, Blum, and Susan and heads deeper into the prison, where he is attacked with a Molotov cocktail by the three inmates who originally mutilated and killed him. While on fire, Cordell kills the three convicts who mutilated him, only to be attacked by Turkell. As Cordell and Turkell fight, the two crash through a wall, fall onto the bus below, and seemingly die when the vehicle explodes.

Some time later, Cordell is buried with full honors alongside 19 other deceased officers he murdered; Susan and McKinney attend his funeral. As Cordell's casket is lowered, McKinney throws Cordell's badge into the grave, leaves with Susan, and monologues about how justice and pressure are the only differences between a cop and a "Maniac Cop". Then the camera slowly and eerily zooms in on Cordell's gravesite. After a few seconds, Cordell's hand unexpectedly bursts through the lid of his casket (in a jump scare) and quickly grabs his badge as the screen cuts to black and the credits roll.

== Cast ==
- Robert Davi as Lieutenant Sean McKinney
- Claudia Christian as Officer Susan Riley
- Robert Z'Dar as Officer Matt Cordell / The Maniac Cop
- Michael Lerner as Deputy Commissioner Ed Doyle
- Bruce Campbell as Officer Jack W. Forrest Jr.
- Laurene Landon as Officer Theresa Mallory
- Clarence Williams III as Joe Blum
- Leo Rossi as Steven Turkell
- Paula Trickey as Cheryl
- Charles Napier as Lew Brady
- Ángel Salazar as Officer Kirby
- Hank Garrett as Tom O'Henton
- Robert Earl Jones as Harry Bergman
- Danny Trejo as Prisoner
- Sam Raimi as News Reporter
- NYPD Detective Bo Dietl as Himself (cameo)

== Release ==
=== Home media ===
Maniac Cop 2 was released direct-to-video in the United States.

Blue Underground gave the film a limited theatrical release in the United States in October 2013, which was followed by the Blu-ray and DVD release on November 19.

=== Trailer ===
The UK video trailer has a different music score than the international trailer and is not featured in the film. Its called Rig-Ram by Anthony Morson and is from the album Industrial Activity, part of the Focus Music Library – FCD 109 collection.

== Reception ==
On Rotten Tomatoes, 56% of 16 critics gave the film a positive review. Variety called Maniac Cop 2 "a thinking man's exploitation film, improving on the 1988 original". TV Guide said the sequel "lacks the element of suspense present in the first film" but "delivers excellent action, [...] some spectacular fire effects and a number of quirky characterizations—a Cohen specialty". Ty Burr rated the film C+ and called it a "brutal, stupid" zombie film in which "the style almost redeems the sleaze". Michael Gingold of Fangoria rated it 3.5/4 stars and called it Lustig's best film. Anthony Arrigo of Dread Central rated it 4/5 stars and wrote, "Maniac Cop 2 embodies all of the excess that made '80s horror sequels so great". Mike Pereira of Bloody Disgusting rated it 4/5 stars and wrote, "Maniac Cop 2 delivers a fresh experience while all along staying true to what fans dig about the original".

Lustig considers Maniac Cop 2 to be his best film, saying that "it was the film [where] I felt as though myself and my crew were really firing on all cylinders. And I think we made a terrific B-movie", and also thinks it's superior to the first Maniac Cop film.
