= Dona Hardy =

American actress

Dona Hardy (December 3, 1912 – February 13, 2011), sometimes misspelled as Donna Hardy, was an American film and television actress.

== Early life ==
Jean Dona Barley was born December 3, 1912 in Los Angeles, California to a single mother, Ethel née MacGillivray, and raised with her mother and maternal grandparents. In the early 1930s she toured the United States with a dance troupe, but left and returned to her native Los Angeles during the Depression. She briefly dated an up-and-coming, but still largely unknown, actor named Anthony Quinn. She was the Executive Director of a United Way affiliate, and retired at age 66, when she looked to begin her acting career.

== Career ==
Hardy began her acting career late in life, usually playing sweet, sometimes deceptively harmless-looking old ladies. During her acting career, Hardy bedded John Ritter, kissed Matthew Perry, and, fitted with a walker, was asked by faux-auteur Jerry Stiller (in an episode of The King of Queens) to consider "some tasteful nudity" for a community theater production of The Gin Game. She worked with Arnold Schwarzenegger and Richard Dawson in her first film credit, the Stephen King-penned thriller, The Running Man, in which she had played "Mrs. McArdle" and had to say the word "motherfucker". "There is nothing that people enjoy so much as hearing old people say dirty words.... I don't know what's so attractive about that, but every old lady knows she is going to be asked to say the 'F' word sooner or later." Her second film credit, When Harry Met Sally..., was her favorite film. Her last role was in 2010.

== Personal life ==
She married Irving Hardekopf in 1946; the couple adopted a son and remained together until his death in 1980. Widowed, she adapted her acting name from a shortened version of her married name. In 2009, she relocated with her son, Bill, a former president/general manager of the Birmingham Barons, to the Birmingham area, where she died on February 13, 2011, aged 98.

== Selected filmography ==
=== Film ===
- The Running Man (1987) - Mrs. McArdle
- When Harry Met Sally... (1989) - Documentary Couple #10
- Shattered (1991) - Pet Shop Woman
- We're Talking Serious Money (1992) - Old Lady
- Universal Soldier (1992) - Old Woman
- Rave Review (1994) - Complaining Patron
- The Cable Guy (1996) - Karaoke Party Guest
- Dogtown (1997) - Other Cast
- The Truman Show (1998) - Senior Citizen
- Civility (2000) - Danni
- Nurse Betty (2000) - Woman Patient
- Sordid Lives (2000) - Mrs. King (Organist)
- Attention Shoppers (2000) - Old Woman
- Serial Killing 4 Dummys (2004) - Rose
- You Did What? (2006) - Neighbor
- Choose Connor (2007) - Old Woman
- Superbad (2007) - Old Lady
- Extreme Movie (2008) - Molly
- Timer (2009) - Sadie
- Spork (2010) - Old Lady
- How to Make Love to a Woman (2010) - Grandma Conners (final film role)

=== Television ===
- Quantum Leap (1989) - Grey Haired Lady
- Designing Women (1990, 1991) - Margaret / Mrs. Chesley
- Night Court (1992) - Margaret Keane
- Hearts Afire (1993, 1994) - Aunt Grace / Elderly Woman / Dorothy Bingham
- ER (1994, 2008) - Freda / Harriet
- The Nanny (1998) - Sister
- Reba (2002) - Mrs. Wolf
- Malcolm in the Middle (2003) - Old Lady
- Charmed (2004) - Old Paige
- The King of Queens (2005) - Minna
- My Name Is Earl (2006) - Hank's Grandmother
- Grey's Anatomy (2006) - Grace Bickham
- It's Always Sunny in Philadelphia (2006) - Old Woman
- Bones (2008) - Nadine Spring
