= Supreme Sanction =

- DVD cover
- Directed by: John Terlesky
- Written by: John Terlesky
- Produced by: Lisa M. Hansen; Paul Hertzberg (executive producer); John Paul Pettinato (co-producer); Hans C. Ritter (line producer)
- Starring: Michael Madsen; Kristy Swanson; David Dukes; Ron Perlman
- Cinematography: Zoran Hochstätter
- Edited by: Daniel Duncan
- Music by: Joseph Stanley Williams
- Production company: CineTel Films
- Distributed by: CineTel Films (non-US); HBO (TV)
- Release date: April 9, 1999
- Running time: 95 min.
- Country: United States
- Language: English

Supreme Sanction is a 1999 action crime thriller film directed by John Terlesky and starring Michael Madsen, Kristy Swanson, and David Dukes. The film premiered on HBO on April 9, 1999. It uses stock footage from a 1998 film Airborne.

== Plot summary ==
A secret government unit, Section Alpha, leads an enemy pilot to attack army helicopters during a patrol, killing a female soldier. A television reporter investigates to uncover the truth but the unit wants him killed too, so it sends a skilled assassin. She deliberately misfires a shot when she sees him with his daughter, making her Alpha's next target, as she recalls the fatal hits on a general who has known all about the attack. After saving his life, she joins him to fight back.

== Cast ==
- Michael Madsen as Dalton
- Kristy Swanson as Jenna
- David Dukes as Jordan McNamara
- Ron Perlman as The Director
- Tommy "Tiny" Lister Jr. as Lester
- Al Sapienza as Holman
- Donald Adeosun Faison as Marcus
- Holliston "Holli" Coleman as Bailey McNamara
- Teo as Ron, The Security Guard
- Dannon Green as Stebbins
- D.J. Berg as Henderson
- Marshall Manesh as Hawk Face Man
