= Komodo vs. Cobra =

2005 film directed by Jim Wynorski

- DVD Cover
- Written by: Jim Wynorski
- Directed by: Jim Wynorski (as Jay Andrews)
- Starring: Michelle Borth; Jerri Manthey; Glori-Anne Gilbert; Ryan McTavish; Ted Monte; Chris Neville; Michael Paré
- Music by: Chuck Cirino
- Country of origin: United States
- Original language: English

Production
- Executive producers: Daniel Gilboy; Michael Paré
- Producer: Paul Hertzberg
- Cinematography: Andrea Rossotto
- Editor: Randy Carter
- Running time: 94 minutes
- Production company: CineTel Films

Original release
- Release: August 19, 2005

Komodo vs. Cobra, also referred to as KVC, is a 2005 American television film directed by Jim Wynorski. It is Wynorski's sequel to his 2004 film Curse of the Komodo. Wynroski says the first film "all turned out rather fun, so much so that they asked me to do a sequel. I said I would do it provided they sent myself and the entire cast to Hawaii to film it… which they did."

== Plot ==
A team of environmentalists, including a reporter, her camera man, and an environmentalist's famous girlfriend charter a boat and with the captain, sail to a military island. They suspect the island is hosting to illegal activities. Upon arrival, however, they find no one. They finally reach a deserted house, where they are confronted Dr. Susan Richardson, who tells them that everyone on the island is dead, including her father. Richardson's team were working on a compound that could make edible plants grow to super size, however the military intervened with plans of their own. They wanted to test the compound's effects on animals, and proceeded to feed it to several Komodo dragons and cobras.

As a result, both species grows to an enormous size and begins to devour everything on the island, including the humans. The group, the doctor, and the boat captain must escape the island, while avoiding Cobra and Komodo. The military finds out that some problems are happening on the island, so they send in troops. One by one the troops are killed by Komodo.

Meanwhile, the group try to escape to the lab, barely escaping both Cobra and Komodo. One environmentalist is killed, and the camera man. In the lab, Richardson tells her flashback of how the military messed things up. Now just wanting to escape the island alive, the group try to get back to the beach. On the beach they try to get to the yacht, but the military drop a bomb on it. Then a cobra comes out the water and eats two more men. The remainder of the group decide to head for a helicopter that was left behind on a mountain by the doctor's father and team. While trying to cross a river to the mountain, one environmentalist is bitten by huge leeches. That is when Dr. Richardson announces that anything that comes into contact with the animal DNA (like saliva) can turn into a huge version of its kind. On the mountaintop, the remaining five run into Komodo, who is blocking the helicopter, the Komodo notices them and begins to attack. Soon, Cobra arrives. The man who was attacked by the leeches weakly makes himself bait. With bullets not penetrating Cobra's skin, only making the giant monster he is devoured.

The military sees footage of the demonic Komodo dragons and the yacht (meaning trespassers) decides to bomb the island, with the Americans still on it.

Soon, Komodo and Cobra begin to fight each other. The boat driver, a retired pilot in air force, flies the three remaining women away. Both Komodo and Cobra are killed in a military bombing on the island, still in mid-battle.

At the end of the film, a scientist, Dr. Michaels, who has escaped the Komodo, reawakens from the dead with reptilian characteristics, such as glowing green eyes and a forked tongue, revealing he is transforming into a Komodo dragon.

== Cast ==
- Michael Paré as Mike A. Stoddard
- Michelle Borth as Dr. Susan Richardson
- Ryan McTavish as Jerry Ryan
- Renee Talbert as Carrie Evans
- Jerri Manthey as Sandra Crescent
- Ted Monte as Ted Marks
- Glori-Anne Gilbert as Darla Marks
- René Rivera as Dirk Preston
- Jay Richardson as Dr. William Richardson
- Rod McCary as General Bradley
- Roark Critchlow as Major Garber
- Paul Logan as Major Frank
- Damian T. Raven as Weeks
- Chris Neville as Lerner
- Del Wills as Marsden
- Mark Mahon as Patterson
- Paul Green as Monroe
- Jordon Krain as Dr. Rhodes
- Dan Golden as Dr. Michaels

== Home media ==
The film was released on DVD on July 25, 2006, by Lionsgate.

== Reception ==
The film received rather negative retrospective reviews.

== Analysis ==
This sequel contains various elements that were part of the first film: experimentation gone awry, father-daughter team, government attempt to bomb things, the ending, Komodo's behaviors, for example.
