= Fast Getaway =

- Directed by: Spiro Razatos
- Written by: James Dixon
- Produced by: Lisa M. Hansen; Paul Hertzberg; Corey Haim
- Starring: Corey Haim; Cynthia Rothrock; Leo Rossi; Ken Lerner; Marcia Strassman
- Cinematography: Jacques Haitkin
- Edited by: David Kern
- Music by: Bruce Rowland
- Production company: CineTel Films
- Distributed by: New Line Cinema
- Release date: April 5, 1991
- Running time: 86 minutes
- Country: United States
- Language: English

Fast Getaway is a 1991 action comedy film, starring Corey Haim, Cynthia Rothrock and Leo Rossi. The film chronicles the adventures of a trio of non-violent bank robbers formed by a teenager (Haim), his immature father (Rossi) and the latter's feisty girlfriend (Rothrock). A sequel, simply titled Fast Getaway II, was released in 1994.

== Plot ==
Sixteen-year-old Nelson Potter is part of a bank robbing team with his father Sam — Nelson scouts targets for the group and acts as a hostage in their endeavors. Their accomplices are Tony and Lilly, the latter a skilled martial artist and Sam's current love interest. Wanting Sam all to herself, Lilly tries to persuade him to cut Nelson from the group, but Sam declines. When she overhears him insulting her afterwards, Lilly refuses to give Nelson his share of the money from their latest heist and viciously attacks Sam, leading Nelson to subdue her at gunpoint. With the partnership dissolved, Tony and Lilly leave the group.

After stealing a new getaway car, Sam and Nelson continue on their own. Sam's goal is to eventually steal enough money to pay for Nelson's college education, although Nelson sees nothing wrong with robbing banks for a living. While robbing yet another bank in Utah, Tony and Lilly tip off the police from their hotel room across the street, and Sam is arrested. With Nelson deemed a runaway, Lilly and Tony rush to claim him at the police station, hoping to utilize him in their own robberies. However, a woman named Lorraine picks up Nelson first after learning about the attempted heist on television. She deftly evades Tony and Lilly in a high-speed chase and takes Nelson back to her home. Impressed with her driving skills, Nelson pleads for her help in breaking his father out of jail.

With Lorraine at the wheel, Nelson successfully retrieves Sam, who reveals that Lorraine is Nelson's biological mother, having lied to his son about her death for years so that Nelson would stay with him after their separation. Feeling betrayed, Nelson tells his father he can no longer trust him. The next evening, Tony and Lilly track down Lorraine at her workplace and follow her back to her home, where they kidnap Nelson.

Using Nelson's maps, atlas, and other resources, Sam and Lorraine deduce that his next target is not a bank, but instead the Salt Lake City Amphitheater. They race to confront Tony and Lilly, who have already robbed the venue by using Nelson as a hostage in a vest loaded with dynamite. After forcing Nelson into the back of their pickup truck at gunpoint, Tony and Lilly attempt to get away with Sam and Lorraine in hot pursuit.

In desperation, Lilly attacks Nelson and throws him from the truck, leaving him dragging precariously behind the vehicle on a strip of chain link fence. With Lilly distracted by a police helicopter, Sam climbs aboard the moving truck and gets the upper hand against Lilly, knocking her onto the highway. He then forces Tony off the road, giving Nelson enough time to remove the bomb and plant it in the truck. While Sam reaches for the detonator, Tony attempts to run him over, but Lorraine rams into the truck with her car at the last second, sending it tumbling down a cliff where it explodes. As the three drive away to seek medical treatment for Nelson, Tony is shown dangling helplessly from the face of the cliff, having survived the ordeal.

Sometime later, Sam, Nelson, and Lorraine embark on a road trip to Canada, where they jokingly make plans for their next bank robbery.

== Cast ==
- Corey Haim as Nelson Potter
- Cynthia Rothrock as Lilly
- Leo Rossi as Sam Potter
- Ken Lerner as Tony Bush
- Marcia Strassman as Lorraine
- Shelli Lether as Honey
- Tabitha Thompson as Girl At Bank
- Jack North as Car Salesman
- Kim Peach as Cissy
- Jeff Olson as Chief Malone
- Richard Jewkes as Sheriff McQuade
- Bernie Pock as Deputy
- Corky Edgar as Bank Teller
- Kelly Ausland as Armored Guard
- Patrick Redford as Officer

== Production ==
The film was a production of Burbank, California-based CineTel, which used a legal entity established in Park City, Utah, called Wasatch Productions, for the shoot. Cynthia Rothrock signed on for the film first, and Haim was later added to the cast. The actor was also named an associate producer on the movie, the first such credit of his career. Rothrock saw the film as crucial to her career, as it was her first not to revolve around martial arts, which she hoped would propel her towards more mainstream roles. It was the main unit directing debut of stunt coordinator and second unit director Spiro Razatos.

Principal photography started on June 6, 1990, and lasted five weeks. While the film is set in Colorado, production spent about three days in that state, and the majority of photography took place in neighboring Utah. The opening robbery is a composite of Provo, for the exteriors, and Salt Lake City for the bank's interior. The post office heist and escape were filmed in Park City. The botched robbery and arrest were actually shot earlier in Lehi. Other spots visited by the shoot included Heber City, Coalville and East Canyon. The film's signature setpiece was shot in Colorado at the Royal Gorge Bridge near Cañon City, and features what was touted by the producers as the highest two-man fall ever recorded in a feature film at the time. In actuality, according to Steve Kelso, one of the stuntmen involved, even the latter part of the 1100-foot descent, a seemingly 400-foot jump towards the river, was controlled by a carefully concealed winch. They still plummeted at a speed of about 40 miles per hour.

While on set, the producers tried to get Rothrock to do frontal nudity, which was more than she had agreed to. She told them to reach out to her agent, after which the demand was not mentioned again. Rothrock also felt that, as a first-time director, Razatos was more prone to asserting his authority towards her, due to her martial arts background, than he was towards the film's seasoned thespians. However, she was allowed to choreograph the hotel room fight scene, and took the opportunity to bring back some acrobatic moves from her Hong Kong films. The fight at the back of the pick up truck was shot as is, with Rothrock's foot being secured by a very small chain preventing her from falling over. When he was supposed to get stomped on by Rothrock, Haim refused to wear padding. The next day, the actress was scolded by the producers and told that filming was suspended, as Haim had complained that she had hurt him. However, when she came back to her hotel, Haim admitted to her that he had invented his injury because he did not want to work that day.

== Release ==
=== Pre-release ===
During production, the film was made with a theatrical release in mind, although its business model was primarily predicted on video sales. At the time, production company CineTel had an agreement with New Line Cinema, which allowed the latter to pick up their products for a theatrical release. To determine its potential, the film was tested in a few markets, and Haim returned to host the trailer in-camera. According to Rothrock, the young actor—dismissing the producers' demand that he remain in character—sported a darker look and chose to rap his lines throughout, which turned off the intended audience and sapped the film's test performance. However, a trailer hosted by Haim can be found online, which shows the actor sticking to his usual look and demeanor.

=== Theatrical ===
Fast Getaway opened at select theaters in Washington state and Oregon on April 5, 1991, with Haim traveling to Portland to promote the film. On June 7, 1991, the film received a second test opening in Iowa. However, it did not garner a positive enough reception to warrant a wider release.

=== Home media ===
The film was released on domestic VHS by RCA Columbia Pictures Home Video on September 18, 1991.

== Reception ==
Fast Getaway received mixed-to-negative reviews from critics. Reviewing the film during its brief theatrical run, Kristin Bell of Vancouver, Washington's The Columbian was most negative, calling it "one of the most idiotic, pointless and awful movies I have ever had the misfortune of watching". She deemed the humor "terrible" and the plot "non existent". Joan Bunke of The Des Moines Register praised the bridge stunt, but found that other setpieces did not stand out enough to compensate for a "dopey script", making the film "a one-stunt flick" rather than the non-stop thrill ride touted by Razatos. TV Guide was more positive, finding that Razatos' shifts from comedy to drama "work surprisingly well" while Rothrock was "sexy, funny and scary", and summing up the movie as "engaging, mindless entertainment with energetic performances and rapid motion".
