= Fire Twister =

- Directed by: George Erschbamer
- Written by: Larry Bain
- Produced by: Kirk Shaw; Stan Spry; Eric Scott Woods
- Starring: Casper Van Dien; Lisa Davis; Johnny Hawkes; Leah Bateman; Jon Mack; Jeff Clarke
- Cinematography: John Murlowski
- Edited by: Helen Tzoutis
- Music by: David Findlay
- Production companies: CineTel Films; Odyssey Media; The Cartel
- Distributed by: CineTel Films
- Release date: June 21, 2015 (Netherlands)
- Running time: 90 minutes
- Countries: United States; Canada
- Language: English

Fire Twister is a 2015 American-Canadian low-budget action-adventure-disaster-sci-fi film directed by George Erschbamer. The film received poor ratings due to poor production quality.

== Plot ==
As part of an eco-group, Scott, an ex-firefighter, Carla, a climate specialist, Barbie, and Jason go to hang up an anti-oil banner on a large storage tank on top of a hill inside a Synco compound. They find a bomb on the tank, planted by the Central Intelligence Agency (CIA), and run away as it explodes. The explosion creates a fire twister which passes down to the town below causing a vast amount of destruction.

Two CIA agents suddenly appear and start shooting at Scott and his companions; they lose their assailants by hiding behind the trees and came across Anthony, a chief engineer at Synco, who confesses they have been making a new hydrogen fuel (MT-11), which was stored in the tank that exploded. He says this fuel burns for a long time and that the twister will keep getting bigger.

Scott's group and Anthony follow the twister in their car into town, which destroys a house and continues through the local town. The group is unhurt, but many other people have been injured. Scott rescues a woman hanging from a tree after being thrown by the twister; she then lets them borrow her car and the group flees just as the CIA agents re-appear. Anthony surmises the twister is attracted to heat. Scott phones a colleague from the fire service and gives him the information on the twister.

Mr. Garber, the Synco CEO, is interviewed by the press and blames the twister on Scott and Carla. A Synco employee speaks out on the news saying the MT-11 fuel was only moved a couple of days ago, and that this tank wasn't rated to safely hold it. Garber speaks to V, one of the CIA agents, on the phone, instructing her to kill Scott.

The twister hits Los Angeles destroying many buildings and incinerating people. Scott follows the twister into the city. They see a car accident and get out to help, but it turns out to be a trap set by the CIA who take the group as hostages. Jason admits that the CEO of Synco paid him to get Scott to put the anti-oil banner on the tank so they could all be framed for the explosion. Seeking redemption, Jason grabs a gun off one of the agents and buys time for the others to escape before he is then killed. Anthony and Scott deduces that Garber may have been placed at Synco by a rival company to sabotage the business.

Anthony hooks up some fuel canisters to the top of a car, and drives toward the twister, planning to destroy it. He sets off an explosion at the base of the twister, killing himself and making it bigger. Scott observes that a large explosion would destroy the twister, so he works out a plan to attract it into an open area and set off a large explosion using C4 and a fire engine full of fuel. They turn the fire hoses into flamethrowers, creating heat to attract the twister.

A news reporter sneaks into the Synco compound and sees the staff clearing everything out. Entering Garber's office, she learns, just before she was killed, that Garber is behind the explosion and creation of the fire twister, and that he has been paid a lot of money to do it.

Scott drives the fire engine toward the twister; Carla and Barbie use the flamethrowers to attract it. They lure the twister to the Synco compound; the CIA agents defend it and shoot at Scott, but he drives straight past them, and the agents are killed by the twister. Garber gets a helicopter to escape, however it's sucked into the twister before it can pick him up. Scott sets up the C4 and jumps out of the fire engine, and it explodes at the base of the twister, destroying it. An axe flies out of the explosion, killing Garber.

== Cast ==
- Casper Van Dien as Scott, an eco-activist, and former firefighter of the Los Angeles Fire Department.
- Lisa Davis as Carla, a climate scientist. (Credited as Lisa Ciara)
- Johnny Hawkes as Jason, Member of The Eco Group
- Leah Bateman as Barbie, Member of The Eco Group
- Jon Mack as CIA Agent "V", one of the assassins ordered by Garber to hunt down Scott
- Jeff Clarke as Anthony, the Chief Engineer at Synco who assists Scott and his companions
- Joe Regalbuto as Mitch Garber, CEO of Synco who was instilled by a rival company.
- Alyvia Alyn Lind as Amber, a little girl

== Reception ==
Letterboxd and The Movie Scene both gave the film a rating of 1/5. Radio Times gave the film a rating of 2/5.
