= Maniac Cop =

1988 American slasher film by William Lustig

- Theatrical release poster
- Directed by: William Lustig
- Written by: Larry Cohen
- Produced by: Larry Cohen
- Starring: Tom Atkins; Bruce Campbell; Laurene Landon; Richard Roundtree; William Smith; Robert Z'Dar; Sheree North
- Cinematography: James Lemmo; Vincent J. Rabe
- Edited by: David Kern
- Music by: Jay Chattaway
- Production company: Shapiro-Glickenhaus Entertainment
- Distributed by: Shapiro-Glickenhaus Entertainment
- Release date: May 13, 1988
- Running time: 85 minutes
- Country: United States
- Language: English
- Budget: $1.1 million
- Box office: $671,382

Maniac Cop is a 1988 American slasher film directed by William Lustig, written and produced by Larry Cohen, and starring Tom Atkins, Bruce Campbell, Laurene Landon, Richard Roundtree, William Smith, Robert Z'Dar, and Sheree North. Z'Dar plays the title character, a murderous former police officer returned from the dead, and seeks revenge on the people who wronged him. The film is the first installment in the Maniac Cop film series.

Maniac Cop was released on May 13, 1988 and grossed $671,382 worldwide on a budget of $1.1 million. The film was followed by two sequels, Maniac Cop 2 (1990) and Maniac Cop III: Badge of Silence (1993).

== Plot ==
In New York City, a waitress on her way home is assaulted by two muggers and seeks aid from a police officer, who breaks her neck. Over the next two nights, this "Maniac Cop" commits more murders, prompting Lieutenant McCrae, who was told by his superiors to suppress eyewitness accounts that the killer was wearing a police uniform, to pass on information to a journalist, in an attempt to protect civilians. This causes panic and dissent among the city, and results in innocent patrolmen either being shot to death by terrified civilians or avoided on the streets by people afraid of them being the Maniac Cop.

Ellen Forrest, suspecting that her husband Jack may be the Maniac Cop, follows him to a motel and catches him in bed with fellow officer Theresa Mallory. Distraught, Ellen runs out of the room, and is slain by the killer. Jack is arrested under suspicion of murder, but McCrae believes Jack has been framed. McCrae gets Jack to tell him about his relationship with Mallory, who is attacked by the Maniac Cop while working undercover as a prostitute. Mallory and McCrae fight off the killer, who is deathly cold through his gloves and does not appear to breathe; when they shoot him several times, the killer appears unfazed.

Mallory hides out in McCrae's apartment while he investigates Sally Noland, the only person Mallory told about her affair. McCrae follows Noland to a warehouse, where she meets with the Maniac Cop and refers to him as "Matt". Returning to police headquarters, McCrae discovers files on Matthew Cordell, an officer who was unjustly put into a maximum-security prison at Sing Sing Correctional Facility in the village of Ossining, New York after being framed for police brutality when he was closing in on corruption in city hall. He was mutilated and killed in a shower room in Sing Sing by other inmates, whom he helped incarcerate.

When McCrae and Mallory visit Jack, they tell him they think Cordell is the real killer and plan to visit the chief medical examiner at Sing Sing. McCrae leaves to go to the clerical room, and he is attacked by Sally, who is convinced that Cordell is going to turn on her. After finding an officer hanging from the ceiling, Sally is beaten to death by Cordell. Hearing the commotion, Jack and Mallory leave the interrogation room and find the corpses of numerous officers strewn about the halls of the building. Mallory goes to McCrae's car while Jack searches for Cordell, who disappears after throwing McCrae out a window, killing him. Jack, who looks like the one responsible for the carnage to responding officers, flees with Mallory.

The two go to see Sing Sing's medical examiner, who admits that while he was preparing to autopsy Cordell, the officer showed faint signs of life. The examiner secretly released Cordell into Sally's care, convinced he was completely brain dead. During the 50th annual St. Patrick's Day Parade, Jack waits outside as Mallory warns Commissioner Pike and Captain Ripley about Cordell, but the two refuse to believe her and have her arrested. Cordell appears and fatally stabs Pike and Ripley, then targets Mallory, knifing the policeman left to guard her. Mallory escapes through a window, while Jack is arrested and placed in a van, which Cordell hijacks.

Mallory and another officer chase the van, which Cordell takes to his warehouse hideout. Cordell attacks Mallory and Jack, kills the other officer, and tries to escape in the van when backup arrives. Jack clings to the side of the van and fights for control of it, causing Cordell to drive into a suspended pipe, which impales him. Cordell loses control of the vehicle, which crashes into the river, and sinks. Afterwards, the van is fished out; as it is searched, Cordell's hand emerges from the water.

=== Alternate ending ===
The extended cut of the film features an additional coda.

The mayor, confident that Cordell is dead, relaxes in his office. After the mayor's assistant leaves the office, Cordell silently appears from behind the curtain and kills the mayor offscreen as revenge for framing him.

== Cast ==
- Bruce Campbell as Officer Jack W. Forrest Jr.
- Tom Atkins as Lieutenant Frank McCrae
- Laurene Landon as Officer Theresa Mallory
- Robert Z'Dar as Officer Matt Cordell / The Maniac Cop
- Richard Roundtree as Commissioner Pike
- William Smith as Captain Ripley
- Victoria Catlin as Ellen Forrest
- Sheree North as Officer Sally Noland
- Rocky Giordani as Officer Fowler
- Nina Arvesen as Regina Sheperd
- Marcia Karr as Nancy
- Jill Gatsby as Cassie Phillips
- Barry Brenner as Police Pathologist
- Sam Raimi as News Reporter
- Jake LaMotta as Detective Motta
- William Lustig as Motel Manager

Uncredited

- Ken Lerner as Mayor Jerry Killium
- Leo Rossi as Mayor's Campaign Manager (extended cut only)

== Production ==
Shooting took place in New York City and Los Angeles. Due to the film's low-budget, only three days of exterior location shooting took place in New York, with the remainder of the film shot in Los Angeles.

Sam Raimi was an uncredited second unit director, mostly contributing to the St. Patrick's Day Parade sequence, which was filmed guerrilla-style during the actual parade.

== Release ==
=== Theatrical ===
Maniac Cop was released by Shapiro-Glickenhaus Entertainment on May 13, 1988. It played in 50 theaters and had a U.S. gross of $671,382.

=== Home media ===
The film was first released on DVD on April 8, 1998, by Elite Entertainment and included a commentary by director William Lustig, writer Larry Cohen, star Bruce Campbell, and composer Jay Chattaway as well as a trailer and deleted scenes. Later, on November 14, 2006, a "special edition" DVD was released by Synapse Films. This version includes the film restored and re-mastered with a DTS soundtrack. In October 2011, Synapse Films released a Blu-ray edition of the film.

== Reception ==
=== Critical response ===
Rotten Tomatoes reports that 53% of 17 surveyed critics gave the film a positive review. Metacritic, which uses a weighted average, assigned the film a score of 40 out of 100, based on 10 critics, indicating "mixed or average" reviews. The film was mostly panned by critics at the time of its release. Variety called it a "disappointing thriller that wastes an oddball premise". Caryn James of The New York Times called it an amateurish film with stiff acting and dialogue. Chris Willman of the Los Angeles Times wrote that film quickly becomes an uninteresting Friday the 13th clone. Time Out London criticized the film as formulaic and said that it might have been better had writer-producer Cohen directed it himself. Richard Harrington of The Washington Post called the script "undernourished and obvious".

Reviewing the Blu-ray release, J. Hurtado of ScreenAnarchy wrote that despite its faults, Maniac Cop deserves mention as one of the last exploitation films set in New York City. Tom Becker of DVD Verdict called it "a fun, mindless gorefest". Bill Gibron of DVD Talk rated it 4.5/5 stars and called it "one of the era's finest forgotten gems", deserving of a critical reappraisal. Noel Murray of The A.V. Club rated it B− and called it a goofy film that was always meant to inhabit the shelves of independent video rental stores. Gareth Jones of Dread Central rated it four out of five stars and called it a cult film that is "amongst the cream of the crop of late-eighties low-budget horror". Bloody Disgusting rated it five out of ten stars and questioned why the film has a cult following when it has a poor script and direction, uneven tone, and boring kills.

Campbell said of the film that it was "not a good movie" when viewed in hindsight, but it initially struck him as "perfectly legit".

== Franchise ==
=== Sequels ===
The film was followed by two sequels, Maniac Cop 2 in 1990, and Maniac Cop III: Badge of Silence in 1993.

=== Remake ===
In 2017, it was rumored that there would be a Maniac Cop remake in the works. As of November 2018, the remake is still being developed and will have a completely different tone from the first film.

In March 2026, it was announced that a Mubi-backed remake of Maniac Cop was to begin shooting in the fall of 2026, according to original director William Lustig, who is executive producing the remake. Nicolas Winding Refn, known for Drive (2011) and The Neon Demon (2016), will direct, after premiering Her Private Hell at Cannes.

=== Potential television series ===
In October 2019, HBO and the French channel Canal+ picked up a Maniac Cop TV series that will be executive produced by Nicolas Winding Refn, through his production company by NWR Originals, and John Hyams, who will also direct the pilot. Screenwriter Ed Brubaker, who worked on the pilot, clarified in 2023 that the project is most likely not going forward.

== See also ==
- Uncle Sam (1996), another Lustig-Cohen slasher film with similar themes about the military
