= Cerberus (film) =

2005 sci-fi/horror television film

- Genre: Horror; Sci-Fi
- Written by: Raul Inglis; John Terlesky
- Directed by: John Terlesky
- Starring: Sebastian Spence; Emmanuelle Vaugier; Greg Evigan
- Music by: Neal Acree; Aldo Shllaku
- Country of origin: United States
- Original language: English

Production
- Producer: Lisa M. Hansen
- Cinematography: Viorel Sergovici
- Editor: Daniel Duncan
- Running time: 92 minutes
- Production company: CineTel Films

Original release
- Network: Sci Fi Channel
- Release: October 29, 2005

Cerberus (also known as Cerberus: The Guardian of Hell), is a 2005 Sci Fi Channel original film, starring Sebastian Spence, Emmanuelle Vaugier, and Greg Evigan. The film was directed by John Terlesky, and was released direct-to-video in 2005.

== Plot ==
Marcus Cutter and a bunch of mercenaries steal Attila the Hun's breastplate from a museum in Bucharest, Romania. They kill the curator Professor Radu before they escape by helicopter.

Meanwhile, Samantha Gaines, Professor Radu's best student, organises an exhibition in New York City. While she awaits the breastplate, her brother Zach is abducted because Cutter and his men need her support. The breastplate is presumed to lead to a legendary Sword of Mars, which makes its owner invincible. Samantha deciphers the inscriptions and finds where the item is hidden. Unfortunately the three–headed dog Cerberus who protects it is more than a legend.

Once Cutter gets his hands on the sword itself he kills everybody who gets in his way, including former Korean general Kul Jae Sung, who originally paid him to deliver the weapon. Samantha has to tackle the momentarily invincible Cutter and the actually immortal beast Cerberus at the same time.

== Cast ==
- Greg Evigan as Marcus Cutter
- Sebastian Spence as Jake Addams
- Emmanuelle Vaugier as Dr. Samantha Gaines
- Brent Florence as Zach Gaines
- Michael Cory Davis as Burke
- John Terlesky as Willis
- Garret Sato as Kul Jae Sung
- K.B. Nau as Knipstrom
- Chuck Caudill Jr. as Reinholdt
- Catalin Paraschiv as Dorsey
- Bogdan Uritescu as Max
- Gelu Nitu as Professor Radu, The Curator
- Florin Busuioc as Lead Villager
- Ilie Gâlea as Bartender
- Alina Dutá as Barmaid
- Gabi Andronache as Attila the Hun
- Mihaela Elena Oros as Romanian Girl
- C. Victor Brynner as Romanian Boy
