= Relentless IV: Ashes to Ashes =

- Directed by: Oley Sassone
- Written by: Mark Sevi
- Produced by: Paul Hertzberg (executive producer); Russell D. Markowitz (producer); Catalaine Knell (co-producer); Leo Rossi (co-producer)
- Starring: Leo Rossi; Famke Janssen; Colleen Coffey
- Cinematography: Russ Brandt
- Music by: Terry Plumeri
- Distributed by: CineTel Films
- Release date: December 21, 1994
- Running time: 95 minutes
- Country: United States
- Language: English

Relentless IV: Ashes to Ashes is a 1994 crime thriller film directed by Oley Sassone. The tagline was: "This time nothing can stop the fear." Relentless IV was filmed in Los Angeles, California. This is the fourth and to date final installment in the Relentless series.

== Synopsis ==
Detective Sam Dietz (Leo Rossi) must yet again find and stop another serial killer who kills women in ritualistic executions. Detective work for Dietz is tough, as he has to juggle two women. One of them is his new female partner Jessica (Colleen Coffey), and the other is psychiatrist Sara Lee Jaffee (Famke Janssen) who holds the key to the case.

== Cast ==
- Leo Rossi as Detective Sam Dietz
- Famke Janssen as Dr. Sara Lee Jaffee
- Colleen Coffey as Detective Jessica Parreti
- John Scott Clough as Martin Trainer
- Christopher Pettiet as Cory Dietz
- Ken Lerner as Al Rosenberg
- Loring Pickering as Detective Keller
- Lisa Robin Kelly as Sherrie
- Rainer Grant as Victim #1 Hairdresser
- Charlene Henryson as Victim #2 Deaf Woman
- Claudette Roche as Victim #3 Grocery Shopper
- John Kelly as Apartment Neighbor
- John Meyers as Murder Suspect

== Home media ==
The film was released directly to videocassette on December 21, 1994 from New Line Home Video.

In 2006, Image Entertainment released a double feature DVD of this and the previous third film, in widescreen.

== Other films in the series ==
- Relentless (1989)
- Dead On: Relentless II (1992)
- Relentless 3 (1993)
