= James Lemmo =

American screenwriter

- Born: James Momel Lemmo; New York City, New York, U.S.
- Other names: Jim Lemmo; James Momel; Jimmy Spears
- Occupations: Photographer; cinematographer; film director; screenwriter

James Momel Lemmo is an American photographer, cinematographer, film director, and screenwriter.

== Biography ==
Prior to dedicating his professional life to photography, Lemmo also worked in film. His genres included thrillers, comedy, action, drama and crime.

Lemmo currently works in advertising photography, commercial photography, all product photography.

== Filmography ==
Director
Year	Title
1987	Heart
1990	Tripwire
1992	We're Talkin' Serious Money
1993	Relentless 3
1994	Dream a Little Dream 2
1995	Bodily Harm
1997	Mike Hammer, Private Eye TV episode (1 episode)
Cinematographer
Year	Title
1981	Ms. 45
1982	One Down, Two to Go
1982	Madman
1983	The Last Fight
1983	Vigilante
1984	Fear City
1988	Maniac Cop
1989	Relentless
1989	Hit List
1989	Easy Wheels
1990	Maniac Cop 2
1994	Dangerous Touch
Screenwriter
Year	Title
1987	Heart
1990	Tripwire
1992	We're Talkin' Serious Money
1993	Relentless 3
1995	Bodily Harm
2000	Nowhere in Sight
