= Fast Getaway II =

- Directed by: Oley Sassone
- Written by: Mark Sevi
- Produced by: Paul Hertzberg; Catalaine Knell; Russell D. Markowitz
- Starring: Corey Haim; Cynthia Rothrock; Leo Rossi; Sarah G. Buxton; Ken Lerner
- Music by: David Robbins
- Production company: CineTel Films
- Distributed by: Live Entertainment
- Release date: December 21, 1994
- Running time: 95 minutes
- Country: United States
- Language: English

Fast Getaway II is a 1994 action comedy film, starring Corey Haim, Cynthia Rothrock and Leo Rossi and Sarah G. Buxton. In it, a reformed bank robber (Haim) is framed for a heist by a vengeful former associate (Rothrock), while his imprisoned father (Rossi) attempts to escape to bring him assistance. It is the sequel to 1991's Fast Getaway.

== Plot ==
Nelson Potter, now retired from bank robbing, runs an insurance business in Tucson, Arizona with his partner Patrice. Their job is to evaluate security measures at local banks by simulating armed robberies. After one such drill, Nelson is confronted and assaulted by a shady FBI agent named Rankin. Later that night, Lilly (a vengeful ex-partner from Nelson's bank robbing days) arrives at the same bank. Faking a flat tire, she tricks the two janitors into opening the door and incapacitates them before sending two of her own men to carry out the robbery. The next morning, Nelson receives a call notifying him of the breach. However, Patrice gets fed up with his immaturity and womanizing and quits the business. Nelson learns that no money was taken from the bank, but instead the thieves were after the contents of a safe deposit box. Nelson brings surveillance photos from the break-in to his father Sam in prison, who quickly identifies Lilly as the culprit.

Meanwhile, Agent Rankin confronts Patrice at Nelson's house. He alleges that Nelson is nothing more than a common criminal, who only escaped justice because his father made a deal with the District Attorney. He also reveals that three of the five banks she and Nelson evaluated for security had been robbed afterwards, and suspects Nelson is responsible. He then manhandles Patrice and threatens her with prosecution if she is involved. Lilly stages a medical emergency at another bank in order to steal a key to the front door. That night, a drunken Nelson returns home from a date to find a burglar lurking within. He chases the man outside, only to be knocked out by Lilly. She then enters the bank with her cohorts and gains access to the vault, where she plants a pocketknife taken from Nelson's home to incriminate him.

Nelson calls Patrice over to his house and the two make amends. While watching his own security footage, Nelson witnesses the encounter between her and Agent Rankin, just before Rankin arrives to arrest him. Nelson flees with Rankin in pursuit, but he eventually manages to get away. At the prison, Sam watches a news broadcast implicating Nelson in the robberies. With the help of Lilly's old partner Tony, Sam escapes the prison and sneaks into Nelson's house, where he runs into Patrice. The two leave together, unaware that Rankin is tailing them. They reunite with Nelson at a laundromat, where Sam reveals Lilly's scheme to replace old money to be taken out of circulation with counterfeit bills. When Rankin arrives, Sam and Nelson barely avoid being captured; Patrice surrenders herself in their stead. With the help of a colleague, she tracks Nelson to the bank where Lilly is predicted to strike next.

Lilly takes Nelson, Sam, and Patrice captive while she robs the bank, but an exploding bundle of money triggers the fire alarm causing everyone to flee. Lilly takes Patrice hostage while Sam and Nelson give chase. When a psychotic Rankin shows up with a grenade launcher, Sam distracts him long enough for Nelson to catch up with Lilly and rescue Patrice. Early the next day, Sam returns to prison just in time for the morning roll call, having smuggled in a bag of money from the previous night's robbery. Outside, Nelson and Patrice share a kiss and discuss renewing their partnership before driving away together.

== Cast ==
- Corey Haim as Nelson Potter
- Leo Rossi as Sam Potter
- Sarah G. Buxton as Patrice
- Cynthia Rothrock as Lilly
- Ken Lerner as Tony Bush
- Anthony T. Pennello as Bruno
- Nicholas Mele as Alejandro Mira
- Peter Liapis as FBI Agent Rankin
- David Alexander Johnston as Dr. Paul Hertz
- Tiffany Grant as Nelson's Date
- Maggie Grant as Bank Teller
- Tina Naughton as Newscaster

== Production ==
Fast Getaway II was shot in and around Tucson, Arizona, where it is set. Other nearby locations visited during the shoot included Saguaro National Park and Sentinel Peak Park. Rothrock mentioned that photography was in progress in a feature published in the Chicago Tribune in early November 1993. The actress acknowledged this film as the first to style her in a manner that strayed from the sports-oriented look associated with her early work. Screenplay duties were entrusted to frequent sequel writer and CineTel collaborator Mark Sevi, who had built a privileged rapport with the company's creative director—and this film's producer—Catalaine Knell.

== Release ==
=== Pre-release ===
The film was screened for industry professionals at the Cannes Film Market on May 13, 1994.

=== Home video ===
Fast Getaway II was released on VHS on December 21, 1994, by Live Home Video in the U.S. and by C/FP Video in Canada. Live also issued a LaserDisc pressing on the same date.

== Reception ==
Fast Getaway II received mixed reviews. Colin Covert of the Minneapolis Star Tribune was positive, noting that "you could do a lot worse than the cheerfully inane Fast Getaway II, featuring bank heists, energetic action sequences, romance and a sense of humor that tells us not to take any of it too seriously". Derek Elley of Variety called the film "a slicker, more technically polished product than the 1991 first entry" and an "OK crimer". However, he noted that "action buffs won't be busting out the doors for this one" as the film mostly "plays on Haim's boyish charm" and "Cynthia Rothrock's fans are likely to feel shortchanged".

The British Film Institute's magazine Sight and Sound deemed it a "very poor" and "unwieldy sequel" that left "Rothrock floundering in unfamiliar surroundings", while "Sassone's direction shows little panache or comic flair". TV Guide criticized the film's unfocused approach, writing that "repartee flies fast and furious in a debased homage to screwball comedy. The anemic martial arts sequences, which rarely involve any of the principals, don't mesh well with the romantic give-and-take. Fast Getaway was barely movie enough the first time around, and the sequel runs out of gas well before the first turn."
