= William Lustig =

American film director and producer

- Born: February 1, 1955 (age 71); New York City, New York, U.S.
- Other name: Billy Bagg
- Education: New York University
- Occupations: Film director; film producer; screenwriter; actor; film distributor
- Notable work: Maniac; Vigilante; Maniac Cop
- Relatives: Jake LaMotta (uncle)

William Lustig (born February 1, 1955) is an American filmmaker and film distributor, known for his work in the horror genre. His best-known films include Maniac (1980), Vigilante (1982), and Maniac Cop (1988) and its sequels. He is also the founder of the boutique home video label Blue Underground.

== Early life and education ==
Lustig was born and raised in New York City. His uncle was middleweight boxing champion Jake LaMotta. He studied filmmaking at New York University while working as a production assistant on the films The Seven-Ups (1973) and Death Wish (1974).

== Career ==
Early in his career, Lustig worked in sexploitation and adult films under the alias "Billy Bagg". He was also the US production manager for the Italian horror films Inferno (1980) and Tenebrae (1982), by Dario Argento.

As a film director, Lustig is best known for his low-budget horror films Maniac (1980), Vigilante (1982), Uncle Sam (1996), Maniac Cop (1988), and its sequels. Lustig has also worked as an actor playing small roles in his own films as well as in films by Sam Raimi, most notably as a fake shemp in Army of Darkness (1992) and a dockworker in Darkman (1990).

He also produced a remake of his film Maniac (2012) and is rumoured to be producing a new upcoming Maniac Cop with Nicolas Winding Refn. In an interview with Vulture in January 2023, Refn, when asked whether the creation of the series was still under discussion, said: "All I can say is, unfortunately, it's not going to happen."

=== Blue Underground ===
Lustig is the founder of Blue Underground, a company specializing in releasing remastered editions of cult, horror, and exploitation movies on DVD and Blu-ray.

== Filmography ==
| Year | Title | Functioned as | | | Notes |
| Year | Title | Director | Writer | Producer | Notes |
|---|---|---|---|---|---|
| 1977 | Hot Honey | Yes | Yes | No | Credited as 'Billy Bagg' |
| 1977 | The Violation of Claudia | Yes | Story | No | Credited as 'Billy Bagg' |
| 1980 | Maniac | Yes | No | Yes | |
| 1982 | Vigilante | Yes | No | Yes | |
| 1988 | Maniac Cop | Yes | No | No | |
| 1989 | Hit List | Yes | No | No | |
| 1989 | Tripwire | No | Story | No | |
| 1989 | Relentless | Yes | No | No | |
| 1990 | Maniac Cop 2 | Yes | No | No | |
| 1993 | Maniac Cop III: Badge of Silence | Yes | No | No | |
| 1995 | The Expert | Yes | No | No | Uncredited; replaced by Rick Avery |
| 1996 | Uncle Sam | Yes | No | No | |
| 2012 | Maniac | No | No | Yes | |

=== Other production credits ===
| Year | Title | Director | Notes |
|---|---|---|---|
| 1973 | The Seven-Ups | Philip D'Antoni | Production assistant |
| 1973 | Hypnorotica | Peter Savage | Production assistant |
| 1974 | Death Wish | Michael Winner | Apprentice editor: New York |
| 1976 | The Zebra Force | Joe Tornatore | Stunt performer |
| 1977 | Sylvia | Peter Savage | Production manager/assistant director |
| 1980 | Bella | Alexander Kubelka | Production manager |
| 1978 | The Squeeze | Antonio Margheriti | Production manager: U.S. |
| 1980 | Inferno | Dario Argento | Production manager: U.S. |
| 1982 | Tenebrae | Dario Argento | Production manager: U.S. |

=== Acting roles ===
| Year | Title | Role | Notes |
|---|---|---|---|
| 1980 | Maniac | Motel Manager | |
| 1982 | Vigilante | Man Exiting Elevator | |
| 1988 | Cameron's Closet | Man Eating Ice Cream | |
| 1989 | Relentless | Cop | |
| 1990 | Darkman | Dockworker | |
| 1992 | Trepanator | Man With Nightmares | |
| 1992 | Army of Darkness | Fake Shemp | |
| 2016 | 222 | Mad Hatter | Short film |
| 2023 | Raven Van Slender Saves Christmas! | Billy | |
