= CineTel Films =

American film production company

- Type: Private
- Industry: Film production, film distributor
- Predecessor: Chicago Teleproductions
- Founded: 1980; 46 years ago (as Chicago Teleproductions); 1983; 43 years ago (as CineTel Films)
- Founder: Paul Hertzberg
- Defunct: 2023
- Fate: Acquired
- Successor: Vision Films
- Headquarters: United States, West Hollywood, California, United States
- Key people: Paul Hertzberg (president)
- Website: cinetelfilms.com

CineTel Films Inc. was an independent film production company and distributor based in West Hollywood, California.

== History ==
In 1980, Paul Hertzberg founded CineTel Films, in Chicago, as Chicago Teleproductions.

In 1981, Lisa Hansen was hired by Chicago Teleproductions, and in 1982, she was recruited by Paul Hertzberg, in 1983, moved to Los Angeles, California with him to do sales for a new independent film studio called CineTel Films. Within a year, Hansen was promoted to vice president and then, the following year, to executive vice president.

CineTel Films put the first direct-to-video film into production on November 30, 1983, which was released in 1984 as E. Nick: A Legend in His Own Mind.

In 1989, the company struck a distribution deal with New Line Cinema to market and distribute the films, and CineTel retained underlying rights to its movies. In 1990, Hansen was named president of the newly formed CineTel Pictures, located in Burbank, California. CineTel Pictures was a separate production from CineTel Films.

Hansen was the president of CineTel Pictures, Inc. and executive vice president of CineTel Films, Inc. In 2001, the company acquired international sales of the PM Entertainment library.

The company was sold to Vision Films in 2023.

== Filmography ==
=== 1980s ===
- E. Nick: A Legend in His Own Mind (1984)
- Screen Test (1985)
- Star Knight (1985)
- Say Yes (1986)
- The Climb (1986)
- Hardbodies 2 (1986)
- Armed Response (1986)
- Captive (1986)
- Cyclone (1987)
- Cold Steel (1987)
- Bulletproof (1987)
- Deadly Illusion (1987)
- Out of the Dark (1988)
- Fear (1988)
- 976-EVIL (1988)
- Hit List (1989)
- Relentless (1989)
- Tripwire (1989)

=== 1990s ===
- Far Out Man (1990)
- Masters of Menace (1990)
- Too Much Sun (1990)
- Fast Getaway (1990)
- Payback (1991)
- Past Midnight (1991)
- 976-Evil II (1991)
- Where the Day Takes You (1992)
- Dead On: Relentless II (1992)
- We're Talking Serious Money (1992)
- Sins of Desire (1993)
- Entangled (1993)
- Relentless 3 (1993)
- Class of 1999 II: The Substitute (1994)
- Teresa's Tattoo (1994)
- Dangerous Touch (1994)
- Fast Getaway II (1994)
- Ghoulies IV (1994)
- Relentless IV: Ashes to Ashes (1994)
- Dream a Little Dream 2 (1995)
- Excessive Force II: Force on Force (1995)
- Carried Away (1996)
- Demolition High (1996)
- Dead Girl (1996)
- Vampirella (1996)
- Sci-Fighters (1996)
- Poison Ivy II (1996)
- Below Utopia (1997)
- Stir (1997)
- Poison Ivy: The New Seduction (1997)
- Demolition University (1997)
- Storm Trooper (1997)
- The Pandora Project (1998)
- Telling You (1998)
- Butter (1998)
- The Assault (1998)
- Out of Control (1998)
- Prague Duet (1998)
- Supreme Sanction (1999)
- The Settlement (1999)
- Judgment Day (1999)

=== 2000s ===
- Chain of Command (2000)
- Meeting Daddy (2000)
- A Rumor of Angels (2000)
- Green Sails (2000)
- They Crawl (2001)
- Guardian (2001)
- The Tracker (2001)
- Time Lapse (2001)
- Project Viper (2002)
- Storm Watch (2002)
- Malevolent (2002)
- Scorcher (2002)
- Con Express (2002)
- Global Effect (2002)
- Hot Desire (2003)
- Detonator (2003)
- Written in Blood (2003)
- Lost Treasure (2003)
- Momentum (2003)
- Deadly Swarm (2003)
- Devil Winds (2003)
- I Accuse (2003)
- Island Rhythms (2003)
- Snakehead Terror (2004)
- Gargoyle (2004)
- Descent (2005)
- Crash Landing (2005)
- Sub Zero (2005)
- Premonition (2005)
- Komodo vs. Cobra (2005)
- Cerberus (2005)
- Caved In: Prehistoric Terror (2006)
- Solar Attack (2006)
- Dark Storm (2006)
- Earthstorm (2006)
- Not My Life (2006)
- A.I. Assault (2006)
- Fire Serpent (2007)
- Termination Point (2007)
- Secrets of an Undercover Wife (2007)
- Judicial Indiscretion (2007)
- Post Mortem (2007)
- Perfect Child (2007)
- Hallowed Ground (2007)
- Bone Eater (2008)
- Beyond Loch Ness (2008)
- Ogre (2008)
- Storm Cell (2008)
- Poison Ivy: The Secret Society (2008)
- Cat City (2008)
- The Secret Lives of Second Wives (2008)
- Sea Beast (2008)
- Ba'al (2008)
- Trial by Fire (2008)
- Kill Switch (2008)
- National Lampoon's Ratko: The Dictator's Son (2009)
- Wyvern (2009)
- Hydra (2009)
- Polar Storm (2009)
- Fire from Below (2009)
- Tommy and the Cool Mule (2009)
- Aussie & Ted's Great Adventure (2009)
- Smile (2009)
- Ice Twisters (2009)

=== 2010s ===
- Icarus (2010)
- I Spit on Your Grave (2010)
- Mongolian Death Worm (2010)
- Stonehenge Apocalypse (2010)
- Goblin (2010)
- Mandrake (2010)
- Ice Quake (2010)
- Behemoth (2011)
- Iron Golem (2011)
- Ghost Storm (2011)
- Camel Spiders (2011)
- Collision Earth (2011)
- Mega Cyclone (2011)
- Doomsday Prophecy (2011)
- Seeds of Destruction (2011)
- Earth's Final Hours (2011)
- Super Shark (2011)
- Snowmageddon (2011)
- The Philadelphia Experiment (2012)
- The Riverbank (2012)
- The 12 Disasters of Christmas (2012)
- End of the World (2013)
- Independence Daysaster (2013)
- I Spit on Your Grave 2 (2013)
- Embrace of the Vampire (2013)
- Grave Halloween (2013)
- The Cure (2014)
- Apocalypse Tomorrow (2014)
- Zodiac: Signs of the Apocalypse (2014)
- Free Fall (2014)
- Christmas Icetastrophe (2014)
- LA Apocalypse (2015)
- Fire Twister (2015)
- Earthfall (2015)
- Lavalantula (2015)
- I Spit on Your Grave III: Vengeance Is Mine (2015)
- They Found Hell (2015)
- Stormageddon (2015)
- Vigilante Diaries (2016)
- Sharkansas Women's Prison Massacre (2016)
- Drone Wars (2016)
- Dam Sharks (2016)
- 2 Lava 2 Lantula! (2016)
- Earthtastrophe (2016)
- Shadows of the Dead (2016)
- Mind Blown (2016)
- All I Wish (2017)
- Global Meltdown (2017)
- Doomsday Device (2017)
- Karma (2018)
- The Amityville Murders (2018)
- Kill Chain (2019)
- Acceleration (2019)
- 2nd Chance for Christmas (2019)
- The Boy, the Dog and the Clown (2019)

=== 2020s ===
- The Penthouse (2021)
