= They Crawl =

2001 film by John Allardice

- Directed by: John Allardyce
- Written by: Curtis Joseph; David Mason
- Produced by: Paul Herzberg (executive producer)
- Starring: Daniel Cosgrove; Tamara Davies; Dennis Boutsikaris; Mickey Rourke
- Cinematography: Maximo Munzi
- Edited by: Craig Kitson
- Music by: Neil Acri
- Production company: CineTel Films
- Release date: March 2001 (Italy)
- Running time: 93 minutes
- Country: United States

They Crawl is a 2001 American science fiction horror film directed by John Allardice, and written by Curtis Joseph and David Mason. The film stars Daniel Cosgrove, Tamara Davies, Dennis Boutsikaris and Mickey Rourke. The film is about giant killer cockroaches and was released in Italian television on March 1, 2001. It was subsequently released directly to video in some other countries.
