= Showbread discography =

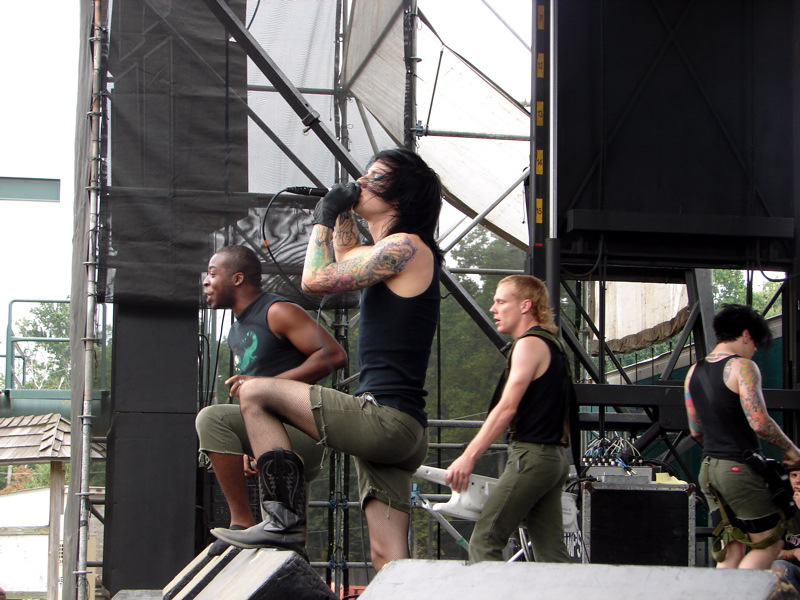
- Studio albums: 12
- Extended plays: 6
- B-sides: 13
- Video albums: 2
- Music videos: 10

The following is a comprehensive listing of releases by Showbread, an American band formed in 1997. Twelve studio albums are listed between 1998 and 2022, along with EPs, compilation appearances, B-sides, DVDs, and music videos.

== Albums ==
=== Studio albums ===
| Year | Title | Label | Chart peaks | | |
| Year | Title | Label | US | US Heat | US Christ |
|---|---|---|---|---|---|
| 1998 | The Dissonance of Discontent | Self-released | — | — | — |
| 1999 | Goodbye is Forever | Self-released | — | — | — |
| 2003 | Life, Kisses, and Other Wasted Efforts | Steel Roots | — | — | — |
| 2004 | No Sir, Nihilism Is Not Practical | Solid State | — | — | — |
| 2006 | Age of Reptiles | Tooth & Nail | 198 | 9 | 14 |
| 2008 | Anorexia | Tooth & Nail | — | 22 | 18 |
| 2008 | Nervosa | Tooth & Nail | — | 23 | 19 |
| 2009 | The Fear of God | Tooth & Nail | — | 12 | 21 |
| 2010 | Who Can Know It? | Come&Live! | — | — | — |
| 2012 | Cancer | Come&Live! | — | — | — |
| 2016 | Showbread Is Showdead | Self-released | — | — | — |
| 2022 | Our Fathers Were Models For God | Self-released | — | — | — |
"—" indicates that the album did not chart

=== EPs ===
| Year | Title | Label |
|---|---|---|
| 1997 | Showbread | Self-released |
| 1998 | Too Much Metal For One Hand | Self-released |
| 2000 | Human Beings are too Shallow to Fall in Love | Coastal Rock Productions |
| 2001 | Goodnight Sweetheart, The Stitches Are Coming Apart | Self-released |
| 2002 | Promotional EP | Self-released |

=== Compilation appearances ===
| Year | Title | Contribution |
|---|---|---|
| 2004 | Solid State Youngbloods Tour 2004 | "Mouth Like a Magazine" "Dead By Dawn" |
| 2004 | This is Solid State, Vol. 5 | "Llama Eats a Giraffe, A (And Vice Versa)" |
| 2005 | You Can't Handle the Tooth | "Dead By Dawn" |
| 2006 | X Worship 2006 | "Matthias Replaces Judas" |
| 2008 | The Ultimate Collection: Tooth & Nail Records | "Mouth Like a Magazine" |
| | A Near Fatal Fall | "Dead By Dawn" |

== B-sides ==
=== Demos ===
| Title | From | Released Through |
|---|---|---|
| "So Selfish It's Funny" | No Sir, Nihilism Is Not Practical | Rare Band Burned Demo/Raw Rock Militia Forum |
| "No Sir Nihilism is Not Practical" (Rough Mix Version) | No Sir, Nihilism Is Not Practical | Raw Rock Militia Forum |
| "Dead By Dawn" | No Sir, Nihilism Is Not Practical | Raw Rock Militia Myspace |
| "And the Smokers and Children Shall Be Cast Down" | No Sir, Nihilism Is Not Practical | Raw Rock Militia Myspace |
| "Your Owls Are Hooting" | Age of Reptiles | Raw Rock Militia Myspace |
| "Sing Me To Sleep" | Age of Reptiles | Raw Rock Militia Forum |
| "The Sky (Alpha)" [Instrumental] | Anorexia | Raw Rock Militia Forum |
| "Nothing Matters Anymore" (20 Second Clip) | The Fear of God | Showbread Forum |
| "Demo Samples" | Who Can Know It? | Raw Rock Militia Forum |
| "I Never Liked Anyone and I'm Afraid of People" (Unmastered) | Who Can Know It? | Raw Rock Militia Forum |

=== Other ===
| Title | Song type | Released through |
|---|---|---|
| Your Owls are Hooting Vs. Luv Addict | Mash-up with Family Force Five | Radio U website |
| Never An Oceanographer | Age of Reptiles b-side | Raw Rock Militia Forum |
| Head Like a Hole (Nine Inch Nails Cover) | Age of Reptiles b-side | Raw Rock Militia Myspace |
| Rudkus | Anorexia Nervosa Clue | Raw Rock Militia Myspace |
| The Truth | Anorexia Nervosa Clue | Raw Rock Militia Myspace |
| F.L.S.P. (Re-Recorded) | Recorded during the Fear of God sessions | Raw Rock Militia Forum |

== DVDs ==
| Year | Title | Label |
|---|---|---|
| 2009 | How Showbread Ruined My Life (DVD) | Self-released |
| 2010 | Nothing Matters Anymore (DVD) | Self- released |

== Music videos ==
| Year | Song | Director |
|---|---|---|
| 2004 | "I Am A Machine Gun (Live)" | Justin Khoo & Robert Pierce |
| 2004 | "Mouth Like a Magazine" | Aquastrada |
| 2006 | "Oh! Emetophobia!" | Shane Drake |
| 2008 | "The Pig (Anorexia)" | The Porter Brothers/In the Boat Productions |
| 2008 | "The Pig (Nervosa)" | The Porter Brothers/In the Boat Productions |
| 2008 | "The Journey (Nervosa)" | The Porter Brothers/In the Boat Productions |
| 2008 | "The Beginning" (seen in concert footage) | The Porter Brothers/In the Boat Productions |
| 2009 | "Vehement" | The Porter Brothers/In the Boat Productions |
| 2009 | "Lost Connection with the Head" | The Porter Brothers/In the Boat Productions |
| 2009 | "I Think I'm Going to See You" | The Porter Brothers/In the Boat Productions |
| 2010 | "I Never Liked Anyone and I'm Afraid of People" | The Porter Brothers/In the Boat Productions |
