= Anorexia (disambiguation) =

Anorexia is an eating disorder of excessive weight loss and usually undue concern about body shape.

Anorexia may also refer to:

== Eating conditions ==
- Anorexia (symptom), the symptom of poor appetite whatever the cause
- Anorexia mirabilis, people who would starve themselves, sometimes to death, for the sake of piety

== Music ==
- Anorexia Nervosa (band), a French symphonic black metal band
- Anorexia Nervosa, a two-part album by the band Showbread
  - Anorexia (album)
  - Nervosa (album)

== Other uses ==
- Sexual anorexia, a lack of "appetite" for romantic-sexual interaction

== See also ==
- Anorectic
- Hunger strike
