= Brundlefly =

Brundlefly or Brundle Fly or variation, can mean:

- Brundlefly (character), the name Seth Brundle (Jeff Goldblum) gives himself in David Cronenberg's 1986 film The Fly

== Music ==
- Brundlefly (band), a Canadian alternative rock band
- "Brundlefly" (song), 1986 instrumental from the soundtrack album for The Fly (1986 film)
- "Brundle Fly" (song), a 2000 song by Usurp Synapse
- "Brundlefly" (song), a 2004 song by Byzantine off the album The Fundamental Component
- "Brundle Fly" (song), a 2009 song by Josh Dies off the EP Talons

== Other uses ==
- Brundle Fly (malware), a Linux ELF-infector virus; see Linux malware

== See also ==
- Brundle (disambiguation)
- Fly (disambiguation)
