= Cancer (Showbread album) =

Studio album by Showbread
- Released: September 25, 2012
- Recorded: May–June 2012
- Genre: Alternative rock, Christian rock
- Length: 49:08
- Label: Come&Live!
- Producer: Rich Veltrop; Showbread

Showbread chronology
| Who Can Know It? (2010) | Cancer (2012) | Showbread Is Showdead (2016) |

Cancer is a science-fiction rock opera and the tenth studio album by American rock band Showbread. The album was released in 2012 through non-profit record label Come&Live!. Cancer was produced by Rich Veltrop, who had previously co-produced Showbread's albums No Sir, Nihilism Is Not Practical, Age of Reptiles, The Fear of God and Who Can Know It?. This is the band's second album to be funded completely by fans and released as a free download without the assistance of a major record label.

== Concept ==
The album and story takes place in the near future, over the years 2014 to 2016, and is told through the journal of main character Kimo which is included in the free download. The journal is divided into four parts, with the story told through entries and clippings.

I: Cycle of Disenchantment (Institution of Principalities) The first part of Kimo's journal outlines history, beginning with a spaceship crashing on earth, then showing pictures of multiple events - including the death of every firstborn in Egypt as told through the Bible, and the Pilgrims' journey to America - with figures shaped as winged and fanged aliens performing actions in those events. Songs in this part: "You Were Born In A Prison" and "Sex with Strangers"

II: Cycle of Oppression and Revolt (Rise of Protozoa) In part two, Kimo is revealed as a member of underground punk rock band The Protozoa, who are an alter ego of Showbread. Pictures of the band performing are that of Showbread performing, and The Protozoa's "anti-music" logo is similar to that of Showbread's. After performing for a long time, The Protozoa are signed to media giant Audio Empire's record label in January 2015. In February, one of the band members leaves, citing Kimo's latest lyrics as "disrespectful, un-american(sic) and sacrilegious". Despite this, the band begins to rise in popularity, revealing a new logo - the "anti-music" logo that, instead of a full circle, is a letter "C", which listeners believe stands for "Cancer", which is a derogatory term for the Principalities, who are the main party in the U.S. government. The band names their newest release "Cancer" in March.

Before the Principality National Convention, graffiti in the shape of the band's logo is discovered on a building in Atlanta. In a response, in April, Audio Empire decides not to release the Protozoa's album on their label or fund their tours. Despite this, Kimo calls his booking agent and books a tour of very small venues to promote their rebellious message, wanting to "keep the label's fingers out of this one". The band tours from July to September, and hides digital copies of their album in each venue, which are discovered and shared online for free.

Songs in this part: "I'm Afraid that I'm Me" and "Anarchy!"

III: Cycle of Inner Grief and Lament (Schism of Kimo) A confused and distressed Kimo makes amends with Audio Empire and performs with the Protozoa on a live broadcast in October after the U.S. Treason of the Arts Act of 2015 is passed and their album is banned. They start promoting a pro-Principality message for the next month, changing their logo to reflect it. Kimo, torn between his beliefs and fame, packs up everything in his house in November and performs one last show with the Protozoa using the old logo and an anti-Principality message. The band is arrested while on stage.

Songs in this part: "Germ Cell Tumor", "Two-Headed Monster", and "Escape From Planet Cancer"

IV: Eschaton Cycle (Glory of the King)

In an Internet chatroom in December, it is revealed that the Protozoa are currently incarcerated by the Principalities. Online, the word "Cancer" has been banned, and users are being forced to use forms such as "c a n c e r" and "ca nc er" to get around it. The chat also reveals that many people believe that the arrest was a marketing gimmick; many others are throwing out all their Protozoa gear in order to break all associations with the band. "Cancer" graffiti with the band's logo is found in an art gallery in a photo taken after the band's arrest.

In January 2016, a man who comes to clean up Kimo's now empty house finds a flash drive, which is thought to contain a copy of "Cancer" on it. The liner notes end here with a "thank-you" section to the fans, who are listed, humorously, as "violators of the Treason of Arts Act". After the credits, one final message is found taped in the journal, that reads: "The cancer of death is defeated by you.", followed by the band's logo.

Songs in this part: "You Will Die In A Prison" and "You Will Not Die In A Prison"

== Track listing ==
1. "I'm Afraid That I'm Me" - 6:56
2. "Sex With Strangers" - 4:30
3. "Anarchy!" - 4:51
4. "You Were Born In A Prison" - 3:52
5. "Germ Cell Tumor" - 4:26
6. "Two-Headed Monster" - 5:55
7. "Escape From Planet Cancer" - 4:02
8. "You Will Die In A Prison" - 9:39
9. "You Will Not Die In A Prison" - 5:01

== Personnel ==
- Josh Dies - story, lyrics and music, art direction, vocals, guitar
- Garrett Holmes - synthesizer, piano, vocals
- Patrick Porter - bass guitar, vocals, additional story development
- Drew Porter - drums
- Rich Veltrop - co-production, engineering, mixing, mastering

== Reception ==
Cancer has received positive reviews. Indie Vision Music said of the album: "'Cancer' is possibly the most refined effort from Showbread to date. Although they span so many genres, most even in the same song, the changes never come off as too much.". Tyler Hess of CMZine wrote: "The music is back to where Showbread belongs, with in your face punk and hardcore inspired raw rock.". Jesus Freak Hideout also wrote a glowing review, saying: "Cancer is Showbread at the top of their game. They've accumulated years of experience in a variety of genres and managed to cram all of that into nine wonderful songs. It's not often you get to listen to an album and feel all the pieces clicking perfectly into place as you do so. That's what Cancer does. The songwriting is flawless and it's fascinating. The instrumentation is diverse and very accomplished. The lyrics are challenging and thoughtful."
