= The Spinal Cord Perception =

2006 novel by Joshua S. Porter

- Author: Joshua S. Porter
- Language: English
- Genre: Novel
- Publication date: 2006
- Publication place: United States
- Media type: Print (Paperback)
- Pages: 321
- ISBN: 1-4276-1129-7

The Spinal Cord Perception is the first novel by Joshua S. Porter, better known by his stage name Josh Dies, the singer/songwriter for the band Showbread. Self-published by Porter in 2006, the book revolves around a small-town substitute teacher named David Rivers, who is haunted by a small black monster which he refers to as the "Llapasllaly". Written in a stream of consciousness narrative, the story is told in a series of bi-polar rants by Rivers, and chronicles his thoughts in non-linear sequences from childhood through his adult life. It depicts his downward spiral into depression, apathy and an apparent anti-social personality disorder. The novel depicts many hallucinations from Rivers' perspective, and the reader is left not knowing which scenes are reality and which are fantasy.

Porter has described the book as "Equal parts black comedy, scathing satire, bleak horror and love story."

== Plot summary ==
David Rivers, a 24-year-old substitute teacher (most likely with anti-social personality disorder) begins the story by moving back to Georgia after spending several months in California fleeing from an undisclosed incident involving a classroom full of children. As the story progresses, we learn that David suffers from visions of a treacherous black creature he calls the Llapasllaly. During these visions terrible things occur, namely the death of his childhood friend, girlfriend and parents among other things. As David becomes increasingly disenchanted with his life in California, his depression culminates with the discovery of his girlfriend's unfaithfulness. After witnessing the Llapasllaly kill her, David returns to his hometown in Georgia and takes another substitute teaching job. He soon meets a woman named Samantha, whom he falls in love with and proposes to. His dark visions seem to subside. Things take a turn for the worse however when David realizes Samantha has a Llapasllaly of her own (who she calls Amelia) and who takes the form of an eating disorder. At the time of this discovery a police investigation into the killing of David's Californian girlfriend finds David in Georgia where a detective issues a warrant for his arrest, believing him to be responsible for the killing. David flees police as Samantha is taken to the hospital for treatment after collapsing. Returning to the elementary school that was the home of the incident that forced David to move to California, David attempts to prove the Llapasllaly's existence by revealing it to a classroom full of special education students. The plan backfires when the Llapasllaly kills a child with Down's syndrome. As David leaves the school, a taxi carrying Samantha arrives and the couple run to reunite before the police car arriving at the scene crashes into Samantha and kills her. David manages to escape the police temporarily and returns to the trailer he was living in. He has a final vision in which the Llapasllaly invites him to commit suicide with sleeping pills. In the final moments before the police arrive to arrest him, David realizes the Llapasllaly exists only in his mind and that the option to live or die is up to him and not the creature.

== Unreliable narrator ==
Several elements throughout the story along with contradictions in David's behavior suggest that he may be the victim of a psychological disorder. Late in the book, we learn that David has been excessively abused by his mother and has largely lied about it. Most likely, David has anti-social personality disorder. David hallucinates a creature called the Llapasllaly doing heinous acts, when in reality he is either responsible for the act himself or the act is simply not what it seems. David is probably a serial killer, beginning with the killing of his childhood friend and leading to the killings of his abusive parents, unfaithful girlfriend and a special education student. By keeping these details hidden from the reader it is easier to sympathize with David, as we see what he sees as a narrator and not necessarily what actually takes place.

== The Llapasllaly ==
The Llapasllaly is a small black creature who stalks David Rivers and has some kind of ghostly ability to speak with no audible voice. Several detailed descriptions are offered to explain the actual appearance of the Llapasllaly, most of which amount to some kind of horrific, gangly monster. It is also compared to an aye-aye, a tarsier, a reptile and a goat. It is unclear whether or not this being actually exists or is a figment of David's imagination. It does seem to steer his perception as well his actions. Several theories exist explaining the truth about the Llapasllaly. Many believe it to be metaphor for sin or evil, and that it is simply a physical manifestation of David's instinctual human evils. It is also possible that certain things the Llapasllaly does, like killing David's girlfriend, aborting a child and choking a small boy with a belt, are actually things that the people are doing themselves because of the evil within and that the Llapasllaly is just a visual reference to that evil. Indications to support this theory other than the fact that most characters cannot see the Llapasllaly are the creatures methods, for instance, the scene in which the Llapasllaly aborts a characters unborn child, it does so using a method almost identical to actual surgical abortion.

== Controversy ==
Porter posted a blog on his website warning readers that The Spinal Cord Perception contained some graphic content that may upset certain fans. He explained briefly his spiritual convictions as an author and contended that everything in the book was included for a specific purpose, and not added for arbitrary shock value. Among these passages are instances in which the Llapasllaly kills certain characters in gruesome ways, David Rivers vaguely details an unfulfilling sexual frustration with a girlfriend he despises, and some graphic scenes dealing with a child who is the victim of molestation.

== First printing typos ==
The original self-publishing of the book contained several typos. Porter joked about this in a 2008 interview when asked if he'd read a book called "The Spinal Cord Perception" saying "I have read it. Very underwhelming. It was a big letdown. You know, all guts and no glory... and lots of misspelled words. Just don't waste your time."

A second printing released in 2009 edited by Paul Bowers corrected these mistakes.
