= James Seale (film director) =

American film director, screenwriter and producer

James Seale is an American director, writer, producer and editor. Born and raised in Philadelphia, Pennsylvania, Seale started shooting short films at the age of twelve and attended Temple University and New York University in their screenwriting and directing programs.

== Career ==
After directing commercials and music videos in Manhattan, Seale moved to Los Angeles to pursue work in film and television. His spec screenplay "Tomorrow Man" was purchased in a preemptive bid by producer Mario Kassar and Paramount Pictures. He wrote the action/comedy “Mama’s Boys” for producer Joel Silver and Warner Bros.

In television, Seale was signed to a blind pilot deal with NBC and producer Warren Littlefield and was hired by showrunner Carlton Cuse to write for the series Black Sash. He has also produced, directed, shot and edited over 75 episodes of Survivor: Ponderosa, a digital companion series to the hit reality show Survivor.

He has written, produced and directed multiple feature films, including the psychological thriller Asylum, starring Robert Patrick and Malcolm McDowell, the sci-fi drama Momentum, with Teri Hatcher and Daniel Dae Kim, and the action thriller Throttle, starring Grayson McCouch, Adrian Paul and Amy Locane.

Seale is the creator, showrunner and director of the supernatural thriller series Safehaven, which is based on his original graphic novel from Michael Bay and his company 451 Media Group.

== Feature Films ==
- Asylum (1997)
- Scorcher (2002)
- Momentum (2003)
- Throttle (2005)
- Juncture (2007)

== Television ==
- Black Sash (2003)
- Survivor: Ponderosa (2015-2021)
- Safehaven (2025)

Seale also directed the short film Post Traumatic, a top five finalist in the Amazon.com/Tribeca Short Film Competition.
