= Who Can Know It? =

Studio album by Showbread
- Released: November 16, 2010
- Recorded: September–October 2010
- Genre: Alternative, Christian rock, piano music, soft rock
- Length: 51:40
- Label: Come&Live!
- Producer: Sylvia Massy, Rich Veltrop, Showbread

Showbread chronology
The Fear of God (2009)	Who Can Know It? (2010)	Cancer (2012)

Professional ratings
Review scores
Source	Rating
Jesus Freak Hideout	4.5/5 stars

Who Can Know It? is the ninth studio album by American rock band Showbread. The album was released on November 16, 2010 through non-profit record label Come&Live!. Who Can Know It? was produced by Sylvia Massy, who had previously produced Showbread's albums No Sir, Nihilism Is Not Practical, Age of Reptiles and The Fear of God. This is the band's first album to be funded completely by fans and released as a free download.

== Track listing ==
1. "A Man with a Hammer"
2. "I Never Liked Anyone and I'm Afraid of People"
3. "Dear Music"
4. "Deliverance"
5. "The Prison Comes Undone"
6. "Hydra"
7. "Myth of a Christian Nation"
8. "You're Like a Taxi"
9. "Time to Go"
10. "The Heart Is Deceitful Above All Things"

=== Bonus tracks ===
1. "Only Jesus Loves You More Than I Do" (demo)
2. "The Drain" (Demo)
3. "Minamata Disease"
4. "Deliverance" (Acoustic)
5. "It Is Well with My Soul"

== Personnel ==
- Josh Dies – lead vocals, guitar, synthesizer, piano, bass, programming
- Garrett Holmes – guitar, synthesizer, piano, bass, vocals
- Patrick Porter – bass guitar, guitar, synthesizer, piano, vocals
- Drew Porter – drums and percussion, synthesizer, guitar
- Rich Veltrop – producer, engineering, mixing, additional harmony arrangements
- Sylvia Massy – producer
