= No Way Up (disambiguation) =

No Way Up is a 2024 thriller film directed by Claudio Fäh.

No Way Up may also refer to

- "No Way Up" (Cro episode), a 1993 episode of the animated series Cro
- Throttle (film), a 2005 thriller also known as No Way Up
