= Age of Reptiles =

Age of Reptiles may refer to:

- The Mesozoic era, a time in geologic history
- Age of Reptiles (comics)
- Age of Reptiles (album), an album by Showbread
- The Age of Reptiles, a large natural history mural
