= Falcon Beach =

- Created by: Shannon Farr; John Murray
- Starring: Steve Byers; Jennifer Kydd; Devon Weigel; Ephraim Ellis; Melissa Elias; Morgan Kelly
- Country of origin: Canada
- Original language: English
- No. of seasons: 2
- No. of episodes: 26

Production
- Production locations: Winnipeg, Manitoba; Winnipeg Beach, Manitoba
- Running time: 60 minutes (approx. 45 min)
- Production companies: Insight Productions; ABC Family Original Productions

Original release
- Network: Global Television Network; ABC Family; YTV; Soapnet
- Release: January 5, 2006 – March 30, 2007

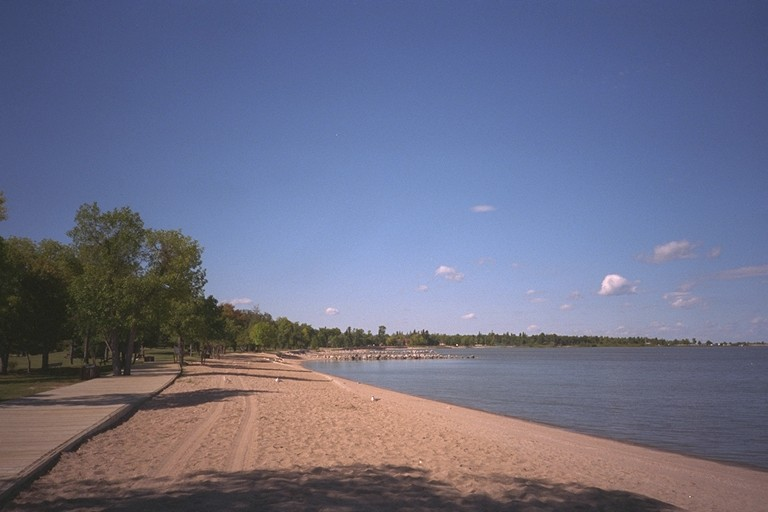
Winnipeg Beach, Manitoba, on Lake Winnipeg

Falcon Beach is a Canadian TV show, filmed in Winnipeg and Manitoba and aired on both Canadian and American networks. It debuted in 2005 as a movie in Canada, but then produced in 2006 as a TV series. It's unique because each episode has two versions: one for Canada with Canadian references and one for the US with American references. The film is set in the resort town of Falcon Beach, Manitoba (New England for U.S. viewers); the program is a teen drama similar in style to The O.C. Despite the decline in rates, the show got renewed for a second season, which aired in 2007.

== Cast and characters ==
=== Main ===
- Steve Byers as Jason Tanner: He is a poor teenager who lives in Falcon Beach with his mother. They own a marina that's barely breaking even. His childhood's friends are Tanya Shedden and Danny Ellis. In the first season of the show, he was a professional wakeboarder and he still loves to do it for fun, even though he doesn't compete anymore. He has dated Tanya Shedden, Paige Bradshaw, and Courtney True. In the last episode he got back together with Paige, his one true love.
- Jennifer Kydd as Paige Bradshaw: She is a pretty, smart and rich girl, the daughter of Trevor and Ginny Bradshaw. She is attending Harvard Business School. She sometimes acts as if she doesn't care about anyone, but she still has feelings for Jason, whom she had been dating. In the last episode the two lovebirds take a trip to Texas.
- Devon Weigel as Tanya Shedden: She is a broke fashion model who moved back to her hometown of Falcon Beach because she was sick of modeling. She was also a drug addict (cocaine, etc.) in the first season and her relationship with town bad-boy Lane Bradshaw didn't help. Tanya got caught with marijuana and went to court and was found guilty. She got back together with Lane Bradshaw (whom she broke up with in the first season) and this relationship has been the only steady relationship with few problems during this season.
- Ephraim Ellis as Danny Ellis: The nice guy. His family runs a local arcade and dance hall. He has many brothers. His parents are dirt poor because they have a lot of kids. He had a major crush on Erin which led to them dating. After they found out that she was pregnant, they moved in with her parents, and when the baby was stillborn, the stress was too much for Erin and they broke up. Now, in the second season his bad side is emerging, in a desperate effort to save the town of Falcon Beach where he grew up, he has done something illegal. Will he get caught? Since Erin left the beach he also seems to be getting closer to a 17-year-old girl who knows his secret, which is that he was planting false artifacts on the digging site for the Bradshaw's resort to stop construction.
- Melissa Elias as Erin Haddad: A lifeguard in Falcon Beach. She has also feelings for Danny, and they dated until their baby was stillborn. She is having a very hard time and is not on the show right now because she left the beach to move in with her parents. She and Danny were like the perfect couple for a while, especially on season 1. She is considered a nice girl.
- Morgan Kelly as Lane Bradshaw: Lane is a troubled young rich boy who is always up to something. He is known as the bad boy. He works for his father, Trevor Bradshaw. He has been dating Tanya Shedden, a former model. He also accidentally kills Mook, the head of the local biker gang and drug dealer. He is son of Trevor and Ginny Bradshaw, and the brother of Paige Bradshaw. In the pilot movie played by Eric Johnson.

=== Recurring ===
- Allison Hossack as Ginny Bradshaw: The mother of Paige and Lane, wife of Trevor Bradshaw. She is a neglected housewife and plans to divorce Trevor. She was dating a man from the country club, even though she is still married to Trevor.
- Ted Whittall as Trevor Bradshaw: A shrewd, previously rich, once powerful business tycoon who started with nothing. He was the president and CEO of the Bradshaw Group until he was unanimously removed by the board of directors because he had made high-risk investments without proper authorization. When he was ousted as CEO he lost everything and he has been trying to rebuild his toppled empire but is consequently on the verge of financial ruin. He married Ginny Bradshaw and is father of Lane and Paige. Now, he is trying to build a resort in Falcon Beach, much to the dismay of the townspeople. His children have recently realized that their father has committed accounting fraud and embezzlement and that the whole resort is actually an illegal setup. Paige then blackmails Trevor into destroying his purchase of the marina because if he doesn't he will face prison time.
- Peter Mooney as Dr. Adrian Keeper: At one point Paige's boyfriend and the new doctor of Falcon Beach. He is single, but seems to have a bit of a crush on Tanya Shedden, who is dating Lane Bradshaw.
- Lynda Boyd as Darlene Shedden: The local hairdresser who is the meddling mother of Tanya Shedden. She is always trying to make Tanya do things that Tanya does not want to do, including stopping seeing Lane Bradshaw, moving back home, and beginning her modeling career again. She had an affair with Trevor Bradshaw in the first season.
- Jill Teed as Peggy Tanner: Jason's mother and former wife of Bobby Tanner. She is very stressed out, especially in the second season, because she owns half of the marina along with her son Jason, and it is not doing too well. In the pilot movie played by Barbara Tyson.
- Stephen Eric McIntyre as Mook: He was the head of the local biker gang and the local drug dealer. Lane Bradshaw accidentally killed him.
- Jeananne Goossen as Courtney True: A rich girl spending the summer away from her parents, she befriends Paige and attracts Jason's attention in the second season. She is a daredevil, living life on the fast lane, but underneath her witty remarks and cool exterior is a lonely and vulnerable person. (season 2)
- Stephen Lobo as Nathan (season 2)

== Episodes ==
=== Pilot movie ===
No.	Title	Original release date	Original airdate (U.S.)
Pilot	"Falcon Beach"	January 29, 2005	June 4, 2006
It's time for summer at Falcon Beach and its May long weekend, you got your town locals Jason, Tanya, and Danny and the out of towners Paige, Lane, and Erin. Tanya comes back to Falcon Beach after a modeling career. Jason can't believe that she came back. Danny runs the arcade with his younger brothers and Danny just can not seem to share his feelings with Erin. Paige gets dragged to Falcon Beach by her mother, whose family had a cottage at Falcon Beach for year and Paige rather be working for her Fathers business. Lane gets into trouble with the local police.

=== Season 1 (2006) ===
No. overall	No. in season	Title	Directed by	Written by	Original release date	Original airdate (U.S.)
1	1	"Starting Over"	Andrew Potter	Elizabeth Stewart	January 5, 2006	June 5, 2006
Tanya is staying with Jason's mom. Then her agent comes to town. Danny's dad is on the edge of losing the arcade. Ginny is forcing Paige to stay in Falcon Beach while everything with her father is getting taken care of.
2	2	"Chemistry Lessons"	Andrew Potter	Therese Beaupre	January 12, 2006	June 12, 2006
Lane comes back to Falcon Beach. A new doctor comes to town. Paige is helping around the arcade. Danny is also trying to see what kind of a relationship he has with Erin. Jason and Tanya go and hang out.
3	3	"Family Portrait"	Bill Corcoran	Sean Jara	January 19, 2006	June 19, 2006
Trevor wants the "perfect family" for the photoshoot and magazine interview; Danny not too happy with what happened between him and Erin; Jason wants to enter the wakeboard competition; Lane makes a deal with Mook.
4	4	"Getting to Know You"	Norma Bailey	Daegan Fryklind	January 25, 2006	June 26, 2006
The Sunset Bar is hosting "Girls Gone Wild" type of Party and Erin really get into it; Jason is getting ready for Wakejam; Danny asks Paige to join on a new project.
5	5	"Summer Solstice"	Norma Bailey	Therese Beaupre	February 1, 2006	July 3, 2006
Paige rents a boat for Jason to use for wakeboarding and causes friction with Tanya and Adrian. Ginny helps Alan prepare for the Summer Solstice festival, while sparks fly between Trevor and Darlene. Joey (played by Brian Robinson) makes his "big splash" in town by opening up the biggest baddest waterpark.
6	6	"Wake Jam"	Unknown	Unknown	February 15, 2006	July 10, 2006
A wakeboarding championship puts pressure on Jason; Ginny's sister visits; Tom gets fired for sexual harassment.
7	7	"Local Heroes"	Unknown	Unknown	February 22, 2006	July 17, 2006
Erin now has to deal with the video on the internet; Ginny heads back to Toronto; the town is working to get the dance hall up again, also the town is hit with something hard.
8	8	"The Blame Game"	Andrew Potter	Stacey Kaser	March 1, 2006	July 24, 2006
Erin is blamed for a drowning tragedy. A social worker visits Zoe after Adrian reports a theft of drugs from the clinic. Tanya tells Jason something devastating about his father.
9	9	"Papa Was a Rolling Stone"	Andrew Potter	Grant Sauve	March 8, 2006	July 31, 2006
Tanya wants Jason to take her back. Danny books Erin's favorite band to open the dance hall. Jason's uncle returns to Falcon Beach for a favor that puts the marina at risk.
10	10	"Trust This"	Norma Bailey	Unknown	March 15, 2006	August 7, 2006
Mook finds out about Lane's on the side dealings. Adrian's wife shows up wanting him back. Jason starts competing, but ends up hurt. Could it be the end of his career?
11	11	"Desperados"	Unknown	Unknown	March 25, 2006	August 14, 2006
Lane is on the run from Mook. Paige tries to get everyone to help him; Trevor is trying to save his marriage but is unaware that Mook is just outside; the Police also discovers something about one of their own.
12	12	"Reckless Love"	Unknown	Unknown	April 1, 2006	August 21, 2006
Tanya gets fired from her job, than gets into an accident. Alex comes onto Jason. Danny and Erin have a life altering decision to make.
13	13	"Summer's Over"	Unknown	Unknown	April 8, 2006	August 28, 2006
With the summer drawing to an end, everyone is discovering where their lives are heading. Jason learns the truth about his father and Paige prepares to leave for Harvard. Ginny discovers her sister sold the cottage under her nose and soon discovers the mysterious buyer is none other than her soon to be ex-husband. Tanya refuses to testify against Lane, even after she learns that without her testimony, she is going to jail.

=== Season 2 ===
No. overall	No. in season	Title	Original release date	Original airdate (U.S.)
14	1	"After the Fall"	January 5, 2007	April 9, 2007
Paige returns to Falcon Beach. Jason tries to make a stand against Lane as he takes claim over the Tanner marina for the new Bradshaw resort.
15	2	"Strawberry Social Reject"	January 12, 2007	April 16, 2007
It's the annual Strawberry Social in Falcon Beach. The battle between the Tanners and Bradshaws continues. While a new girl, Courtney True, comes to town. Danny tries to deal with the loss of the baby, but Erin handles it in a different way.
16	3	"The Spins"	January 19, 2007	April 23, 2007
Nathan represents Tanya in court, but Jason doesn't agree with his aggressive attack plan. Paige gets more involved with the family business. Erin's mood swings reach dangerous levels.
17	4	"Tidal"	January 26, 2007	April 30, 2007
It's Paige's birthday and she's making plans on going back to Boston. Trevor will do anything to make his little girl stay.Lane has plans of his own that involves Mook. Jason and his mom get a new offer on the Marina.
18	5	"Turn Card"	February 2, 2007	May 7, 2007
Paige starts her PR job and is met with public opposition, including Danny. Jason takes big risks to save the Marina, while Lane is haunted by the memory of Mook.
19	6	"The Music Video"	February 9, 2007	May 14, 2007
Lane hits another bump, when Mook's girlfriend comes looking for her share of the money; Paige finds out what Danny has been up to; Tanya's time to shine on a music video. Winnipeg's Paper Moon guest stars as the band.
20	7	"Lost"	February 16, 2007	May 21, 2007
Boat troubles keep Paige from a crucial business meeting, allowing Lane to grab the opportunity. Tanya impresses everyone with her European experience. Sparks fly between Peggy and a Falcon Beach authority figure.
21	8	"Sins of the Father"	February 23, 2007	May 28, 2007
Tanya's former agent tempts her to return to modelling, which upsets Lane. Paige and Nathan have awkward moments in their relationship. Friends and family are concerned as Jason gets in deep stealing a boat for Sinclair.
22	9	"Thirteen Minutes to Midnight"	March 2, 2007	June 4, 2007
Most everyone is at Talent Night at the Sunset Bar when a fight breaks out. The night's events are relived from different view points to uncover how the fight started.
23	10	"Lovers & Cheaters"	March 9, 2007	June 13, 2007
Panic from Mook's death details effects Tanya's health, prompting her to visit Adrian. Jason and Peggy pack up their belongings, while Paige and Lane struggle with the secretly dim financial situation of the Bradshaw development.
24	11	"Permanent Collection"	March 16, 2007	June 20, 2007
While everyone participates in the annual scavenger hunt, Trevor tries to reconnect with Ginny. Tanya, Lane, and Adrian's relationship triangle intensifies, and Jason & Paige attempt to help Danny decide on his future.
25	12	"Vigil"	March 23, 2007	June 27, 2007
Paige feels her values conflicting with everyone at Oasis, including Nathan. Tanya makes up her mind about Adrian, but is busy avoiding Officer Palmer. After finally getting back on his wakeboard, Jason discovers a new opportunity.
26	13	"The Next Life"	March 30, 2007	July 4, 2007
Erin wants another chance with Danny, while Ginny is ready to divorce Trevor. Paige agrees to go to Texas with Jason, but plans change when she discovers Lane's secret about Mook and the marina.

== Cancellation ==
Global TV announced on April 20, 2007, that it was cancelling the series after ABC Family announced they would not be renewing the series for summer of 2008. Fans organized an effort to save the show during mid-2007 that did not succeed. The final episode aired on March 30, 2007; it was broadcast on July 3, 2007, in the United States.

The cancellation of the series was a result of ABC Family's decision to decline bringing it back for a third season. Without the financial support from the U.S. cable channel, continued production of the series was not possible. Executive producer Kim Todd remarked that Global offered to pick the show up for a third season but at a substantially lower cost than the first two seasons.

Falcon Beach's audience was made up of predominantly 12- to 17-year-old girls, among whom the show was popular. However, the series failed to attract many outside that age group and ABC Family wanted a broader demographic – i.e. 18 to 49 viewers.

== Music ==
The music on Falcon Beach is composed by Ari Wise and the music supervisor Sarah Webster. In the movie pilot in 2005, the music was supplied by many Canadian indie acts as well major label Canadian artists.

- Pilate
- Brundlefly
- Doctor
- Paper Moon
- Matt Mays & El Torpedo
- Sam Roberts
- Holly McNarland
- Sloan
- BOY

The title theme song "Beautiful Blue" is sung by Winnipeg-born Holly McNarland.

== DVD release ==
BCI Eclipse released Falcon Beach - The Complete First Season on DVD in the US on September 4, 2007. As of 2009, this release has been discontinued and is out of print as BCI Eclipse ceased operations.
