= James Seale =

James Seale may refer to:

- James Ford Seale (1935–2011), Ku Klux Klan member and murderer
- James Seale (film director) (active since 1997), American writer, director and producer
