= Blue Sky (1994 film) =

- Theatrical poster
- Directed by: Tony Richardson
- Screenplay by: Rama Laurie Stagner; Arlene Sarner; Jerry Leichtling
- Story by: Rama Laurie Stagner
- Produced by: Robert H. Solo
- Starring: Jessica Lange; Tommy Lee Jones
- Cinematography: Steve Yaconelli
- Edited by: Robert K. Lambert
- Music by: Jack Nitzsche
- Distributed by: Orion Pictures
- Release date: September 28, 1994
- Running time: 101 minutes
- Country: United States
- Language: English
- Budget: $16 million
- Box office: $3.4 million (US/Canada)

Blue Sky is a 1994 American comedy-drama film directed by Tony Richardson and written by Rama Laurie Stagner, Arlene Sarner, and Jerry Leichtling. The film stars Jessica Lange and Tommy Lee Jones, with supporting performances from Powers Boothe, Carrie Snodgress, Amy Locane, Chris O'Donnell, and Mitchell Ryan. Set in the 1960s, the story follows a U.S. Army engineer who becomes entangled in a military nuclear cover-up while navigating challenges posed by his wife's volatile behavior.

Rama Laurie Stagner created her screenplay by adapting an unpublished manuscript of her father. He had written about the tensions of his job and family life after resigning from the military in 1964. She also drew from her own memories as the eldest of two daughters.

Blue Sky was Richardson's final film before his death in 1991. Its release was delayed until September 1994 because of the bankruptcy of the distributor Orion. Though a box office disappointment, the film received generally positive reviews.

Lange's performance was highly praised. She won the Academy Award for Best Actress, as well as a Golden Globe Award, becoming the fifth actress to win Oscars for both Best Supporting Actress and Best Actress. The film's score was composed by Jack Nitzsche.

== Plot ==
In 1962, Major Hank Marshall and his wife Carly face marital difficulties due to the pressures of Hank's military career and Carly's mental health issues. Hank is a nuclear engineer who favors underground nuclear testing, an initiative code-named "Blue Sky", rather than above-ground, open-air detonations. Carly is highly volatile, sometimes supercharged with anger or exuberance. Their two daughters: Alex, a teenager, and her younger sister Becky, have gone through many cycles with their mother.

Hank is reassigned from Hawaii to a poorly maintained base in rural Alabama. Carly reacts to the assigned house in fury, attacking leftover furnishings and screaming at Hank. Then she embarks on shopping sprees to fix it up. Her erratic behavior particularly unsettles the eldest daughter Alex.

The day after their arrival, Hank meets with base commander Colonel Vince Johnson. He dismisses Hank's support for underground testing despite the strong scientific evidence presented.

Meanwhile, Vince's wife Vera extends an invitation to Carly and Hank for a social event hosted by the base officers' wives. At the party, Carly becomes intoxicated and dances provocatively with Vince when Hank won't dance. Both Vera and Hank (and other attendees) disapprove of the unseemly display.

Alex and Glenn, son of Vince and Vera, meet at a base get-together and gradually begin to spend secret time together. Glenn takes her to a building in a closed-off area of the base. She opens a box, finds a grenade, and mistakenly pulls the pin. Glenn throws it outside, where it detonates and sets a fire, drawing alarms and troops.

Both sets of parents forbid the relationship. Vince has another reason to get Hank out of the way. Carly is invited by the officers' wives to participate in a dance recital and dedicates herself to rehearsing.

Hank is sent to the Nevada Test Site to oversee the initial underground test under Lieutenant Colonel Robert Jennings. Hank is wary, having seen Vince's designs on Carly and realizes that she depends on him for stability.

During the test, Hank observes two cowboys in the testing area and requests that Robert abort the test, but Robert refuses, disregarding the cowboys' safety and sending Hank back to Alabama. While Hank is away, Alex and Glenn discover that Vince is having an affair with Carly.

Hank learns of the affair after his return on the night of the dance recital. He confronts Vince about the test problems and the affair. The men's physical confrontation results in Carly being pushed out a window that shatters; she is hospitalized for her wounds. Hank is arrested, and Vince presents Carly with a choice: to either have Hank court-martialed or commit him for a period to a psychiatric facility.

When Carly tells him, Hank says he would have chosen the court-martial, to publicize the problems with testing and coverup about the cowboys. He realizes Vince has set him up. Before he can act, military police transport him to the hospital, where he is heavily sedated.

Suspecting foul play, Carly investigates Hank's documents and discovers the report on the cowboys. She drives cross-country with her daughters and finds the cowboys, who now show signs of radiation sickness. The government has abandoned them. She urges them to go to the press with their story, but they refuse.

The morning of the test, Carly steals a horse and enters the test site to attract media attention and prevent the test. As a result of the information she reveals to Robert, he arranges for the protected release of both Carly and Hank.

Carly returns home to find Hank waiting for her, having resigned from the Army. She learns that Vince was relieved of his duties. Hank announces he is going to teach at a college in California, where maybe the society is "a litle looser". Before the move, Carly shows up with a red convertible, and the family departs in optimism.

== Cast ==
- Jessica Lange as Carly Marshall
- Tommy Lee Jones as Hank Marshall, Carly's husband
- Powers Boothe as Vince Johnson
- Carrie Snodgress as Vera Johnson, Vince's wife
- Amy Locane as Alex Marshall, Carly & Hank's first daughter
- Chris O'Donnell as Glenn Johnson, Vince & Vera's son
- Mitchell Ryan as Ray Stevens
- Dale Dye as Col. Mike Anwalt
- Tim Scott as Ned Owens
- Annie Ross as Lydia
- Anna Klemp as Becky Marshall, Carly & Hank's second daughter
- Gary Bullock as Dr. Vankay
- Michael McClendon as Lt. Col. Robert Jennings
- Anthony Rene Jones as Helicopter Pilot
- Jay H. Seidl as Soldier on Island
- David Bradford as Soldier #1
- Rene Rokk as Yves French NATO Officer
- Matt Battaglia as NATO Soldier
- Rod Masterson as Unnamed Reporter

== Production ==
Blue Sky was filmed from May 30 to August 28, 1990. However, due to the bankruptcy of Orion Pictures, the film's release was delayed until 1994.

It also marks the final film of director Tony Richardson, who died on November 14, 1991, prior to the film's release.

== Reception ==
=== Critical response ===
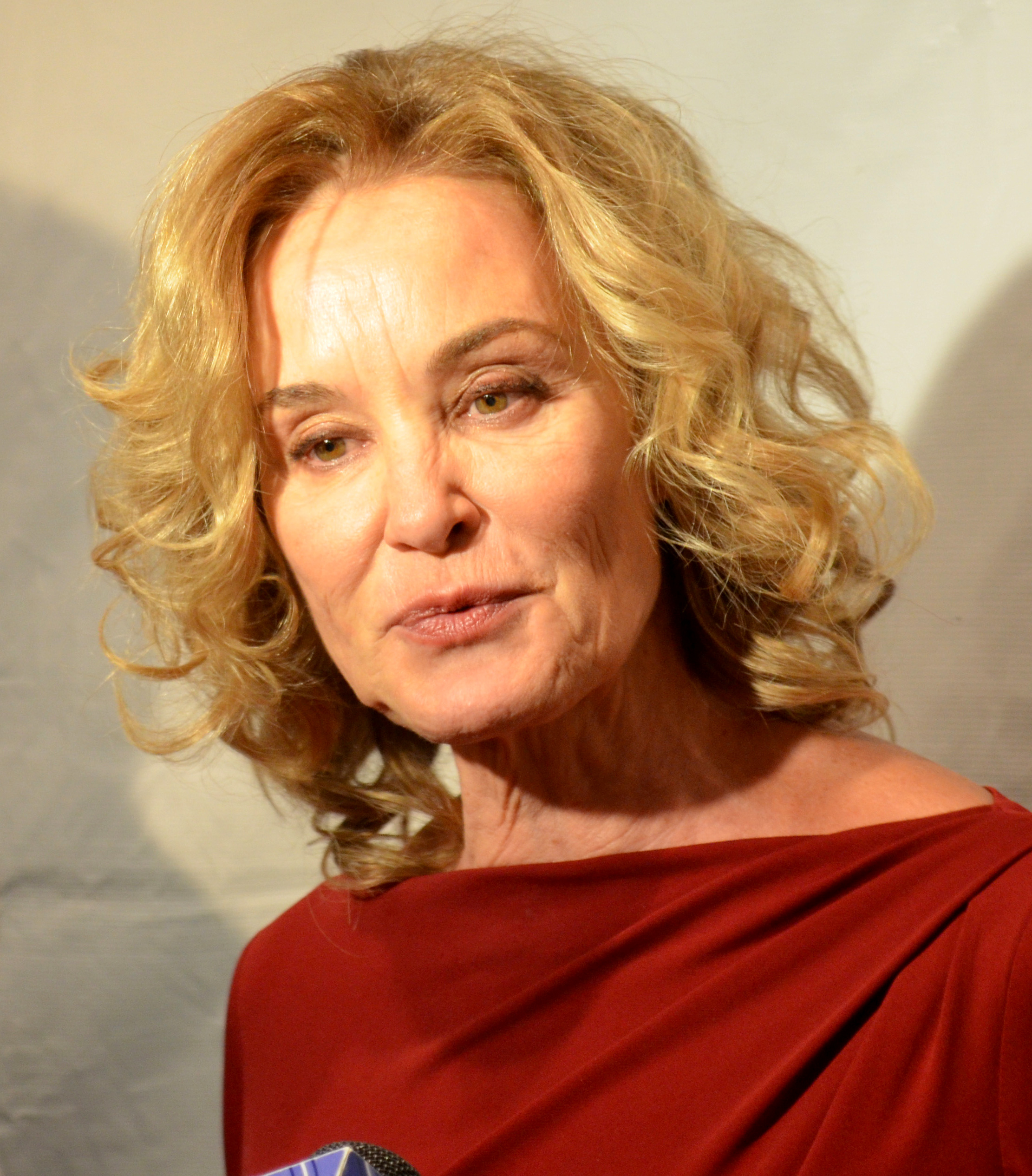
Jessica Lange's performance in the film received critical acclaim and earned her the Academy Award for Best Actress

Blue Sky received generally positive reviews from critics, with Lange's performance receiving critical acclaim. The film holds an 80% approval rating on Rotten Tomatoes, based on 25 reviews, with an average rating of 6.4/10.

The New Yorker praised Lange, describing her role as "a stunning performance—perhaps the best of [her] remarkable career," while Entertainment Weekly described her performance as "a fierce, brave, sexually-charged performance, one of the most convincing portrayals I've seen of someone whose behavior flirts with craziness without quite crossing into it." The Los Angeles Times also lauded her work, calling it "striking" and noting that "Lange's acting in Blue Sky leaves you awestruck. It's a great performance — probably her best." Variety highlighted Lange's "full-blown star turn" as Carly Marshall, observing that "Brigitte Bardot and Marilyn Monroe are about the only other actresses one can imagine pulling off such a role as well as Lange has... [She] has the showy role, with almost unlimited opportunities to emote and strut her stuff, which she does magnificently and with total abandon." The Washington Post described her portrayal as "a plush, platinum star turn," noting, "She is what Carly imagines she might have become if only she hadn't been a military wife: mostly Monroe with a soupçon of Bardot." The New York Times echoed these sentiments, stating, "It is a lavish role for Ms. Lange, and she brings to it fierce emotions and tact. [It] echoes [her] dazzling role in Frances (1982)," while the New York Daily News observed, "Lange smolders, storms, rages and whimpers through Blue Sky, acting with every muscle in her body."

=== Awards and nominations ===
Award	Category	Nominee(s)	Result	Ref.
Academy Awards	Best Actress	Jessica Lange	Won	
Chicago Film Critics Association Awards	Best Actress	Jessica Lange	Nominated	
Golden Globe Awards	Best Actress in a Motion Picture – Drama	Jessica Lange	Won	
Los Angeles Film Critics Association Awards	Best Actress	Jessica Lange	Won	
National Society of Film Critics Awards	Best Actress	Jessica Lange	3rd Place	
Sant Jordi Awards	Best Foreign Actress	Jessica Lange	Won	
Screen Actors Guild Awards	Outstanding Performance by a Female Actor in a Leading Role	Jessica Lange	Nominated	
Young Artist Awards	Best Performance by a Youth Actress Co-Starring in a Motion Picture	Anna Klemp	Nominated	
Young Artist Awards	Best Performance by a Youth Actress Co-Starring in a Motion Picture	Amy Locane	Nominated	

=== Year-end lists ===
- 4th – Peter Rainer, Los Angeles Times
- Honorable mention – David Elliott, The San Diego Union-Tribune

== See also ==
- 1963 Partial Nuclear Test Ban Treaty, a treaty prohibiting all test detonations of nuclear weapons except underground
