= Momentum (2003 film) =

- Movie poster
- Screenplay by: Deverin Karol
- Directed by: James Seale
- Starring: Louis Gossett Jr. Teri Hatcher; Grayson McCouch; Michael Massee; Nicki Aycox
- Music by: Joseph Williams
- Countries of origin: United States; Germany
- Original language: English

Production
- Executive producers: Michael Braun; Jeff Ivers
- Producers: Lisa M. Hansen; Paul Hertzberg
- Cinematography: Maximo Munzi
- Editor: Mark Manos
- Running time: 88 min.
- Production company: CineTel Films

Original release
- Network: Sci Fi Channel
- Release: July 26, 2003

Momentum is an American-German television film that premiered on Sci Fi Channel on July 26, 2003. The film was directed by James Seale.

== Plot ==
Physics professor Zach Shefford (Grayson McCouch) has regarded his telekinetic gifts as a curse rather than a blessing. This sentiment is obviously not shared by ruthless Pentagon agent Raymond Addison (Louis Gossett Jr.), who recruits Shefford for a dangerous mission in which his "second sight" talents will be taxed to the utmost. It seems that, back in 1977, Addison had overseen Project Momentum, wherein dozens of telekinetics were brought together ostensibly for the purpose of benefiting mankind. But the project got out of hand when the participants' powers became too powerful and deadly, forcing Addison to kill them all.

However, one of the participants, Adrian Geiger (Michael Massee), managed to escape, and is now at large, with a vast telekinetic army at his beck and call. It is Shefford's job to infiltrate Geiger's camp and finish the job that Addison had started. Upon falling in love with fellow telekinetic Tristen Geiger (Nicki Aycox), Shefford finds that his loyalties are wavering—and begins to suspect that the villains in this particular melodrama may in fact be the heroes, and vice versa.

FBI agents Jordan Ripps (Teri Hatcher) and Frank McIntyre (Carmen Argenziano), who have been investigating an armored-car hijacking, follow Zach to Geiger. A telekinetic tug-of-war leads to a psychic showdown at the complex where Project Momentum was developed. Zach must finally choose the side to be on when telekinetic war breaks out. With Tristen prepared to follow in her father's footsteps and telekinetic sleeper cells in place across the nation, the momentum is building.

== Cast ==
- Louis Gossett Jr. as Raymond Addison
- Teri Hatcher as FBI Agent Jordan Ripps
- Grayson McCouch as Zachary Shefford
- Michael Massee as Adrian Geiger
- Nicki Aycox as Tristen Geiger
- Carmen Argenziano as FBI Agent Frank McIntyre
- Morocco Omari as Lincoln
- Zahn McClarnon as "Hawk"
- Daniel Dae Kim as FBI Agent Frears
- Alexondra Lee as Brooke
- Zach Galligan as FBI Director Hammond
- Brad Greenquist as Martin Elias
- Sean Blakemore as Floor Cop #2
