= Safehaven =

American supernatural thriller drama television series

- Genre: Supernatural; Thriller; Drama
- Created by: James Seale
- Based on: Safehaven by James Seale
- Starring: Georgie Murphy; Dylan McEwan; Alec Carlos; Bob Frazer; Melissa Marie Elias
- Country of origin: United States
- Original language: English

Production
- Executive producers: James Seale; Kevin V. Duncan; Stan Spry; Nick Maiorano; Eric Scott Woods; Thomas P. Vitale; John Gentile; Anthony Gentile; Jessica Gentile; Douglas Nunes; Eric Birnberg; Thomas Walden
- Producer: Anthony Fankhauser
- Cinematography: Greg Nicod
- Running time: 42-57 minutes
- Production companies: Ravenwood Productions; Cartel Pictures; 451 Media Group

Original release
- Network: Tubi
- Release: December 1, 2025

Safehaven is an American supernatural thriller drama television series created by James Seale, based on his graphic novel of the same name. It stars Georgie Murphy, Dylan McEwan, Alec Carlos, Bob Frazer, and Melissa Marie Elias. The series premiered on December 1, 2025, on Tubi.

== Premise ==
Safehaven tells the story of high school comic artist Jenna Frost, who must uncover the truth after horrifying visions come to life from her creations, threatening to destroy everything around her. Safehaven takes the high school drama into new territory wrapping it in a 70’s style conspiracy thriller of suspense, paranoia, dark humor, and otherworldly horror.

== Cast ==
=== Main ===
- Georgie Murphy as Jenna Frost, a fierce, complicated high school comic book artist.
- Dylan McEwan as Marcus, Devin's boyfriend and Jenna's former love interest.
- Alec Carlos as Ethan, Jenna's best friend.
- Bob Frazer as John Rayburn, a mysterious new school counselor.
- Gino Anania as Will, a busboy helping Jenna navigate in a new, hostile world.
- Melissa Marie Elias as Ellen Harwick, a doctor overseeing Jenna.
- Karl Thordarson as Stuart Frost, Jenna’s estranged father.
- Sophia Carriere as Holly, Jenna's best friend.
- Jerni Stewart as Devin, Jenna's bully.
- Josh Strait as Scylla, a school's villainous security head.
- Aaron Merke as Francis Zelk, a predatory teacher.

=== Recurring ===
- Danika Frederick as Nikki Reeves, a private investigator for Stuart's law firm.
- Jesse Nobess as Chris, Jenna's addict friend.
- Nia Cummins as Dr. Grace Hollister, CEO of Meridian Corp.
- Christin Park as Dr. Riley Cadell, a researcher at Meridian.
- Meredith Rose as Adi Rayburn, John's deceased daughter.
- Chelsea Rankin as Laura Frost, Jenna's mother.
- Stephen Eric McIntyre as Craven, Jenna's tattoo parlor boss.

== Production ==
=== Development and pre-production ===
The comic book and graphic novel Safehaven was revealed by Michael Bay's 451 Media Group at the L.A. Comic Con on October 28, 2017. On July 1, 2020, it was announced that 451 Media Group would adapt the novel into a ten-episode series, working alongside Ravenwood Productions and Cartel Pictures.

=== Filming and design ===
Initial production and filming for Safehaven began in June 2022, having been delayed due to the COVID-19 pandemic. To respect COVID-19 protocols and safety measures, the series was filmed using virtual sets including "" temperature checks ... and full-body scans along with "weekly COVID testing." Additionally, the cast and crew was given on-site "campus-style accommodations", along with a "pod system with departments operating autonomous[ly]." On the subject of filming techniques, executive producers stated that "this production is going to embrace the best of old-world production techniques, including analog film stocks [...] and also cutting edge Virtual Set technologies to create the exciting parallel world in the Safehaven story. We also intend to utilize holograms from Groove Media And Entertainment in both the production and the promotion of Safehaven."

=== Lawsuit ===
In 2024, Ravenwood Productions sued producer David Ozer and Strong Studios for embezzling from the shows production budget. In 2025, David Ozer plead guilty to wire fraud and embezzlement. Original distributor Screen Media Ventures (under the Chicken Soup for the Soul Entertainment banner) filed for bankruptcy in 2024 and was unable to release the series. Ravenwood Productions retained all rights to the series, which was released in December 2025.

== Release ==
Safehaven was released on December 1, 2025, on the free streaming service Tubi. The ten hour-long episodes were released simultaneously.
