= Alien Express =

- Written by: Tom Alexander; Brian Smith
- Directed by: Turi Meyer
- Starring: Lou Diamond Phillips; Amy Locane; Barry Corbin; Todd Bridges
- Theme music composer: Tom Batoy; Franco Tortora
- Country of origin: United States
- Original language: English

Production
- Producers: Terence M. O'Keefe; Scott Vandiver
- Cinematography: Michael G. Wojciechowski
- Editor: Matthew Booth
- Running time: 120 minutes

Original release
- Network: Sci Fi Channel
- Release: August 13, 2005

Alien Express (also known as Dead Rail) is a 2005 television film directed by Turi Meyer and stars Lou Diamond Phillips, Amy Locane, Barry Corbin, and Todd Bridges. The film was released direct-to-video on August 13, 2005, when it was aired on Sci Fi Channel.

== Plot ==
A new super train is speeding passengers to Las Vegas, along with a U.S. Senator from Texas running for president, when a meteorite crashes into a car near the tracks, releasing a tiny creature. The train stops to survey the damage, and the police are called. This stop allows the creature to board the train before it once again speeds off. Once it kills and consumes everyone aboard the train, it begins to grow and multiply into many differing creatures.

== Cast ==
- Lou Diamond Phillips as Vic Holden
- Amy Locane as Rosie Holden
- Barry Corbin as Senator Frank Rawlings
- Todd Bridges as Peter
- Steven Brand as Paul Fitzpatrick
- Joseph Daniel Hamilton as Sam
- Sean Bott as Russell
- Steffanie Sampson as Dispatcher
- Scott Vandiver as Scotter
- Stephen Rippey as Robert
- Dee Macaluso as Martha Rawlings

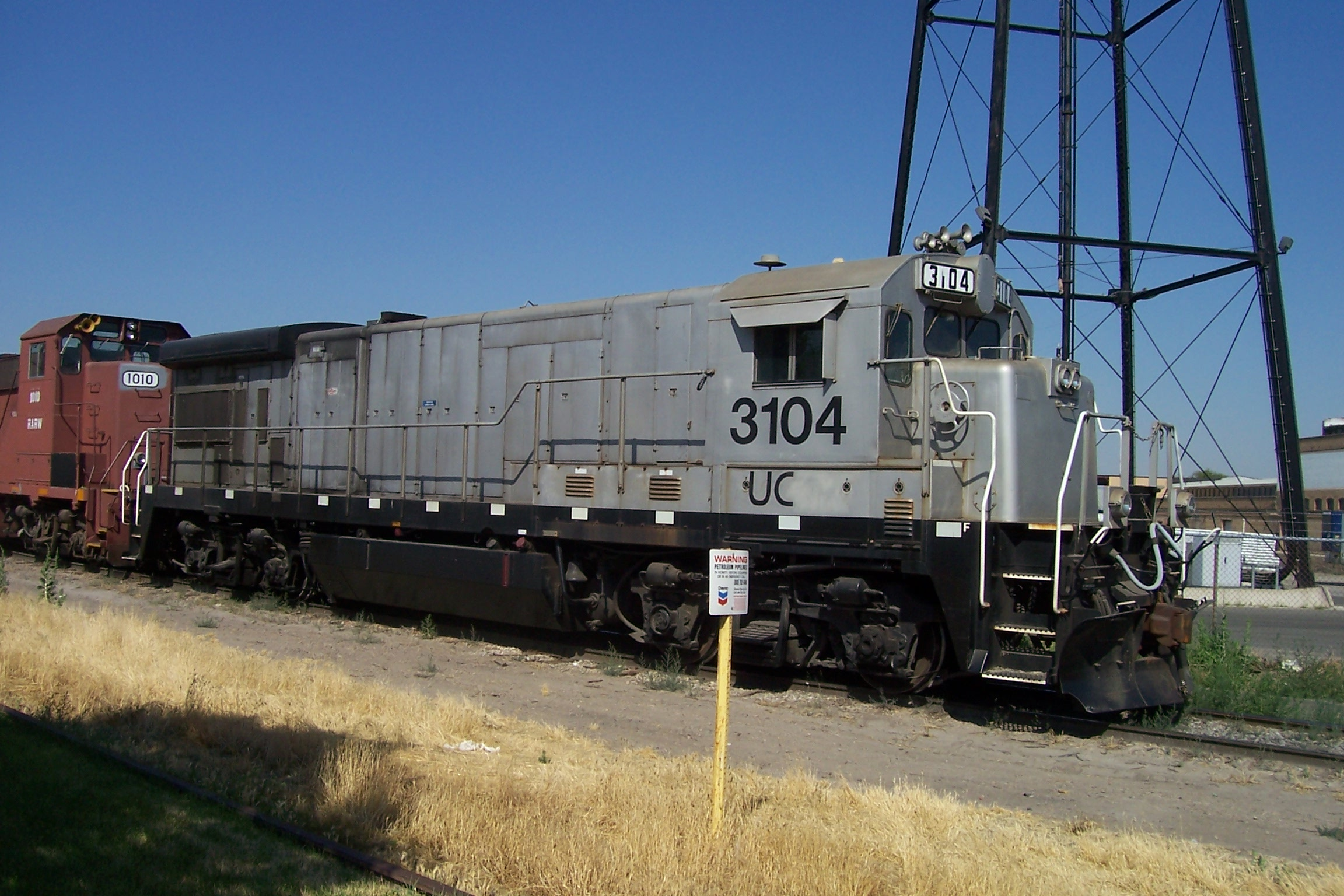
The locomotive used in the film.
