= Ebenezer (1998 film) =

1998 Canadian television film by Ken Jubenvill

- DVD cover
- Genre: Fantasy; Drama; Western
- Based on: A Christmas Carol by Charles Dickens
- Written by: Donald Martin
- Directed by: Ken Jubenvill
- Starring: Jack Palance; Ricky Schroder; Amy Locane; Albert Schultz
- Theme music composer: Bruce Leitl
- Country of origin: Canada
- Original language: English

Production
- Executive producers: Chad Oakes; Barbara Ligeti; Cindy Lamb
- Producers: Michael Frislev; Douglas Berquist
- Cinematography: Henry Lebo
- Editor: Paul Mortimer
- Running time: 89 minutes
- Production companies: Image Organization; Nomadic Pictures

Original release
- Network: TNT
- Release: November 25, 1998

Ebenezer is a 1998 Canadian made-for-television film starring Jack Palance and Ricky Schroder. It is a re-telling of Charles Dickens' classic 1843 novella A Christmas Carol with Jack Palance giving a performance as Ebenezer Scrooge, á la Western genre.

A TV film with high production value, it premiered in the United States on November 25, 1998, on TNT.

== Plot ==
Ebenezer Scrooge is the most greedy, corrupt and mean-spirited crook in the old West and he sees no value in "Holiday Humbug." But when the ghosts of Christmas Past, Present and Yet to Come open his eyes, Scrooge discovers that love and friendships are the greatest wealth of all.

== Featured cast ==
- Jack Palance as Ebenezer Scrooge
- Ricky Schroder as Samuel Benson
- Amy Locane as Erica Marlowe
- Albert Schultz as Bob Cratchit
- Daryl Shuttleworth as Fred, Ebenezer's Nephew
- Richard Comar as Ghost of Christmas Present
- Michelle Thrush as Ghost of Christmas Past
- Richard Halliday as Jacob Marlowe
- Susan Coyne as Clara Cratchit
- Joshua Silberg as Tim Cratchit

== Home media ==
There were at least two DVD pressings produced. One was by Platinum Disc Corporation and the most recent was by Lionsgate Home Entertainment in 2005, but not believed to be in general release at this time. The original VHS version is long out of print.

A DVD copy (Region 4 PAL) was released in Australia by RAAM (a division of Payless Entertainment) by arrangement with Screen Media.

== See also ==
- Adaptations of A Christmas Carol
- List of Christmas films
