= Brundle (disambiguation) =

Brundle may refer to:

- Brundle (surname)
- Brundle (malware), an ELF-infector virus; see Linux malware
- Orangeville/Brundle Field Aerodrome (TC id: COB4), Ontario, Canada; the Brundle airfield serving Orangeville
- Brundle Group, a car sales company from Robin Brundle

== See also ==
- Brundlefly (disambiguation)
