= The Fear of God (Showbread album) =

Studio album by Showbread
- Released: August 11, 2009
- Recorded: April–May 2009
- Genre: Metalcore, Christian metal
- Length: 45:59
- Label: Tooth & Nail
- Producer: Sylvia Massy, Rich Veltrop, Showbread

Showbread chronology
Nervosa (2008)	The Fear of God (2009)	Who Can Know It? (2010)

Professional ratings
Review scores
Source	Rating
Allmusic	4/5 stars
Jesus Freak Hideout	4/5 stars 4.5/5 stars
Bring on Mixed Reviews	3.5/5 stars

The Fear of God is the eighth studio album by American band Showbread. The album was released on August 11, 2009 through Tooth & Nail Records. The Fear of God was produced by Sylvia Massy, who had previously produced Showbread's 2004 and 2006 albums No Sir, Nihilism Is Not Practical and Age of Reptiles respectively. According to lead singer Josh Dies, the album is "hard and it's fast and it's chaotic and it's structured and it's catchy and it's melodic and it's emotional and deep and... it's Raw Rock. Straight up, real as ever Raw Rock."

== Track listing ==
All tracks are written by Josh Dies and Showbread.

No.	Title	Length
1.	"I'm Lost"	1:12
2.	"Nothing Matters Anymore"	4:12
3.	"Lost Connection With the Head"	3:12
4.	"Regret Consumes Me"	3:05
5.	"Out of My Mind"	3:18
6.	"Vehement"	2:40
7.	"The Great Emasculation"	3:11
8.	"Shepherd, No Sheep"	4:07
9.	"Let There Be Raw"	3:18
10.	"I Think I'm Going to See You"	3:52
11.	"Precursor"	2:46
12.	"The Fear of God"	6:20
13.	"Until We Meet Again"	4:51
Total length:		46:04

== Personnel ==
- Josh Dies - Lead vocals, guitar, synthesizer
- Mike Jensen - guitar, vocals
- Landon Ginnings - guitar, vocals
- Patrick Porter - bass, vocals
- Jordan Johnson - drums
- Rich Veltrop - engineering, additional guitar
- Sylvia Massy - mellotron, production
