= Thomas F. Duffy =

American actor (born 1955)

- Born: November 9, 1955 (age 70); Newark, New Jersey, U.S.
- Occupation: Actor

Thomas Francis Duffy (born November 9, 1955) is an American actor. He has appeared as the sadistic rapist Charles Wilson in Death Wish II, the paleontologist Dr. Robert Burke in The Lost World: Jurassic Park, and as the football-loving dad in Varsity Blues.

== Early life ==
Thomas was born in Newark, New Jersey, and was raised in Woodbridge, New Jersey. While attending Woodbridge High School, he played football, ice hockey, tennis, and track and was active in drama and vocal music. He was originally a pre-law student at Ohio University, where he also played football and ice hockey. Duffy auditioned for an opera, was cast, and finally graduated with a BFA in acting. He was a member of Ohio's 1979 MCHL championship hockey team. He also was selected for the 1979 summer company of the Monomoy Theater, in Chatham, Massachusetts, on Cape Cod.

== 1980s ==
Thomas arrived in Hollywood in 1980, and was cast in an episode of CHiPs, which he never filmed, because the next day he was set to co-star as Dave Christian, a member of the 1980 gold medal Olympic hockey team in Miracle on Ice, a mini-series. Duffy made his feature film debut as Nirvana, Charles Bronson's chief nemesis in Death Wish II. He went on to appear in such films as To Live and Die in L.A., The Abyss, Crossroads and State of Grace and guest starred on Night Court, The Fall Guy, The Twilight Zone, MacGyver, and recurred on A Year in the Life on television.

== Career ==
Duffy appeared in the 1992 film The Waterdance, a feature that won the 1992 Sundance Festival Audience award and the 1993 Independent Spirit Best Picture award, with his friend, William Forsythe.

Duffy played the palaeontologist Dr. Robert Burke in Steven Spielberg's 1997 blockbuster, The Lost World: Jurassic Park based on the novel of the same name by Michael Crichton which was a sequel to the book and film Jurassic Park also authored by Crichton and Spielberg respectively. He prepared for the role by watching paleontologist Dr. Robert Bakker (who his character was based on) and traveled to Wyoming to work on a dig with Bakker.

In 1999, Duffy played Sam Moxon in Varsity Blues, a film about Texas high school football. Duffy was almost killed when his car was struck by a hit-and-run driver, while filming in Austin, Texas.

Other films Duffy completed in the 1990s were Independence Day, Mercury Rising, Poodle Springs, The Fan, The River Wild, Wolf, Out for Justice, The Mambo Kings and Let the Devil Wear Black.

He guest starred on The X-Files as Jeffrey Cahn in episode "Alpha", Tales From the Crypt, NYPD Blue, High Incident, The Magnificent Seven, Chicago Hope, Matlock, Chicken Soup for the Soul, TV movies, If Looks Could Kill, Nothing Lasts Forever and White Dwarf and recurring roles on Picket Fences, Days of Our Lives, and In Living Color.

== Personal life ==
His father, Peter T. Duffy, was killed by a drunk driver in his hometown of Woodbridge, New Jersey, in 1992. Thomas was filming The Mambo Kings at the time, and the producers cut a scene so he could return home. His youngest sister, Patricia, was also killed by a drunk driver in Woodbridge, in 1990.

Thomas was filming Wagons East! in 1994 with John Candy in Durango, Mexico, when John died from a heart attack.

== 2000s ==
Thomas appeared in the features Scorcher, The Standard, and World Trade Center for Oliver Stone. Thomas appeared in two roles in WTC, as the Command Center cop, and as the Ground Zero fireman who pulls John McLoughlin (Nicolas Cage) from the rubble.

Guest starring television appearances included Without a Trace, ER and G vs E, recurring roles on Cover Me: Based on the True Life of an FBI Family, The Agency, and Family Law.

== 2010s ==
Thomas appears in the film Rubber, which opened in the US in 2011 from Magnet Releasing. Rubber is a 2010 French horror comedy film about a tire that comes to life and kills people with its psychic powers. It was directed and written by Quentin Dupieux. The film premiered at the 2010 Cannes Film Festival.

Duffy was seen in the Paramount feature Super 8, directed by filmmaker J. J. Abrams, produced by Steven Spielberg, and released on June 10, 2011, in both conventional and IMAX 3D theatres.

On television, Thomas is recurring on the hit ABC comedy series The Middle as Jack Meenahan, the Hecks' neighbor. He also guest starred on Law & Order: Los Angeles, and the Showtime pilot Shameless.

In 2010, Thomas plays the role of executive Whitman Hayes in the film The Candidate, to be released in 2011.

== Filmography ==
- Miracle on Ice (1981, TV Movie) as Dave Christian
- CHiPs (1981, TV) as Nick
- Today's FBI (1981, TV) as Bob Tenner
- Death Wish II (1982) as Charles 'Nirvana' Wilson
- The Fall Guy (1982, TV) as Pump Jockey
- T.J. Hooker (1982, TV) as Morgan
- Baby Sister (1983) as Michael Fancher
- Whiz Kids (1984, TV) as Carter
- Getting Physical (1984, TV Movie) as Killer
- Space (1985, TV Movie) as Brad
- Command 5 (1985, TV Movie) as Lew
- To Live and Die in L.A. (1985) as Credit Card Counterfeiter
- The Twilight Zone (1985, TV) as Businessman (segment "Night of the Meek")
- The Last Precinct (1986, TV) as Harvey
- Casebusters (1986, TV)
- Divorce Court (1986, TV)
- Outlaws (1987, TV) as Gil
- MacGyver (1987, TV) as Corey
- A Year in the Life (1988, TV) as Ross
- Night Court (1989, TV) as Dale Coderko
- Danger Zone II (1989) as Dumptser
- The Abyss (1989) as Construction Worker
- Nasty Boys (1990, TV)
- State of Grace (1990) as Frankie's Man
- Almost an Angel (1990) (uncredited)
- Out for Justice (1991) as O'Kelly
- My Life and Times (1991, TV) as Josh Kincaid
- Guilty as Charged (1991) as Evans
- Matlock (1991, TV) as Bartender
- The Waterdance (1992) as Dr. Harrison
- Two-Fisted Tales (1992, TV Movie) as Scorby (segment "Showdown")
- The Mambo Kings (1992) as Mulligan
- Tales from the Crypt (1992, TV) as Deputy Wilson
- To Protect and Serve (1992) as Stewart
- In Living Color (1992–1993, TV recurring) as Officer Murphy / Senator Watson
- Eye of the Stranger (1993) as Ballack
- Picket Fences (1994, TV) as Deputy Tully
- Wolf (1994) as Tom
- Wagons East! (1994) as Clayton Ferguson
- The River Wild (1994) as Ranger
- White Dwarf (1995, TV Movie) as Fisherman with Parasite
- Chicago Hope (1995, TV) as Ralph King
- Nothing Lasts Forever (1995, TV Movie) as Bill Lomax
- If Looks Could Kill (1996, TV Movie) as Officer Bryant (uncredited)
- Independence Day (1996) as Lieutenant
- The Fan (1996) as Figgy
- High Incident (1997, TV Series) as Billy
- The Lost World: Jurassic Park (1997) as Dr. Robert Burke
- Mercury Rising (1998) as Audey (uncredited)
- Poodle Springs (1998, TV) as Fat Cop
- Let the Devil Wear Black (1999) as Bartender
- NYPD Blue (1999, TV) as Vic's Killer
- Varsity Blues (1999) as Sam Moxon
- The X-Files (1999, TV) as Jeffrey Cahn
- The Magnificent Seven (1999, TV) as Johnson
- Chicken Soup for the Soul (1999, TV) as Paul
- Runaway Virus (2000, TV Movie) as Coyote
- G vs E (2000, TV) as Mr. Burly
- Cover Me: Based on the True Life of an FBI Family (2000, TV) as FBI Superintendent Coswell
- Family Law (2001, TV) as Carl Layton
- Scorcher (2002) as Anderson
- ER (2002, TV) as Detective Henderson
- The Agency (2003, TV) as Chief of Station Cruz
- The Drone Virus (2004) as Russell Wheeler
- Gone But Not Forgotten (2005, TV Movie) as Chief O'Malley
- Without a Trace (2005, TV) as Bob
- The Standard (2006) as Dylan's Father
- World Trade Center (2006) as NYC Command Centre Operator
- Funniest Commercials of the Year: 2008 (2008, TV Movie) as Chainsaw Man
- The Middle (2009-2011) as Jack Meenahan
- Rubber (2010) as Cop Xavier
- Law & Order: Los Angeles (2010, TV) as Mel Wilcox
- The Candidate (2010, Short) as Whitman Hayes
- Shameless (2011, TV) as Tommy
- Super 8 (2011) as Rooney
- Supremacy (2014) as Deputy Lansing
