= Legacy (American TV series) =

1998 western drama series

- Genre: Western drama
- Created by: Chris Abbott
- Written by: Chris Abbott; Joel Blasberg; Heather Conkie; Joel Fields; Philip Gerson; Robert Hamilton; Lauren Levian; Judith McCreary; Paul Perlove; Russell Rotherberg; Jennifer Tait
- Directed by: Bill Duke; Jan Egleson; Arthur Forney; Stuart Gillard; Manfred Guthe; Joe Scanlan; T.J. Scott; Sandy Smolan; David Straiton; Stephen Surjik; Randy Zisk
- Starring: Brett Cullen; Jeremy Garrett; Sharon Leal; Grayson McCouch; Ron Melendez; Lea Moreno; Sarah Rayne
- Composers: Claude Desjardins; Loreena McKennitt; Eric N. Robertson
- Country of origin: United States
- Original language: English
- No. of seasons: 1
- No. of episodes: 18

Production
- Executive producer: Chris Abbott
- Producers: Joe Morton; Sean Ryerson
- Running time: 60 mins. (approx)
- Production company: Atlantis Films

Original release
- Network: UPN
- Release: October 9, 1998 – July 30, 1999

Legacy is an American Western drama television starring Brett Cullen which aired on UPN for eighteen episodes from 1998 to 1999. The series is set on a Kentucky horse farm soon after the American Civil War. Cullen's character of Ned Logan is the 42-year-old widowed patriarch of the family. The series focuses on domestic and romantic crises, such as the arrival of 17-year-old orphan Jeremy, and Sean Logan's interracial affair with the daughter of a former slave.

== Overview ==
A family-run horse farm nestled among the rolling bluegrass country provides the picturesque backdrop for Legacy, a family drama series that chronicles the proud and close-knit Logan family as they struggle to maintain their deep-seated family values of hard work and integrity in a society increasingly driven by money, power, and self-indulgence.

My grandfather came to this country 100 years ago and built an incredible life for his family out of nothing. This land means everything to us... He left us a legacy – to give others less fortunate than we are a chance to turn their lives around." – Ned Logan.

In Legacy, Ned seeks to pass on the "legacy" of his Irish ancestors – to build a solid foundation of love and support for his family while giving others less fortunate a chance to make better lives for themselves. Beyond stables of horses and acres of farmland, Ned must keep sight of his family, whose lofty ambitions, romantic entanglements, and mischievous adventures ensure the Logans notoriety within social circles. Eldest son Sean (Grayson McCouch) is a handsome, charismatic young man with a promising future and a secret love that could threaten his dreams; Clay (Jeremy Vincent Garrett), the passionate, yet hot-tempered son, who often feels that his father's compassion for others does not extend to him; Alice (Lea Moreno), an upright and conflicted teenager forced by her mother's death to play the maternal role in the family, but still searching for her own identity; and Lexy (Sarah Rayne), the youngest and most willful of the offspring, who often demonstrates wisdom beyond her years.

Adding drama to the family's already delicate balance is Jeremy (Ron Melendez), a street-wise and troubled 17 year-old orphan from New York who is taken in by Ned Logan. With a history of dishonesty and petty crime, Jeremy finds himself a fish out of water as he builds both relationships and rifts with the rest of the family.

Legacy ran for 18 episodes before being cancelled. The show was cancelled mid-story, without story resolution.

== Cast ==
=== Main ===
- Brett Cullen as Ned Logan
- Jeremy Garrett as Clay Logan
- Sharon Leal as Marita Peters
- Grayson McCouch as Sean Logan
- Ron Melendez as Jeremy Bradford
- Lea Moreno as Alice Logan
- Sarah Rayne as Lexy Logan

=== Recurring ===
- Lisa Sheridan as Vivian Winters
- Steven Williams as Isaac Peters
- Sean Bridgers as William Winters
- Michele Little as Miss Forrester
- Mark Joy as Col. Harry Griffith
- Casey Biggs as John Haden Turner
- Brigid Brannagh as Molly
- Gabrielle Fitzpatrick as Charlotte Bentley Logan

== Episodes ==
No.	Title	Directed by	Original release date	Prod. code
1	"The Gift"	Unknown	October 9, 1998	101
2	"Tango"	Unknown	October 16, 1998	102
3	"Blood Relative"	Unknown	October 23, 1998	103
4	"Brother Love"	Sandy Smolan	October 30, 1998	106
5	"Emma"	Bill Duke	November 6, 1998	104
6	"The Search Party"	Unknown	November 13, 1998	105
7	"Kind Eye"	Jan Egleson	November 20, 1998	107
8	"The Big Fix"	Sandy Smolan	December 8, 1998	108
9	"Homecoming"	David Straiton	December 18, 1998	109
10	"Winner's Circle"	Unknown	January 1, 1999	110
11	"Full House"	Unknown	February 5, 1999	111
12	"Just Kissed"	Unknown	February 12, 1999	112
13	"The Rivals"	Unknown	February 19, 1999	113
14	"Winter's Storm"	Unknown	February 26, 1999	114
15	"A New Beginning"	Unknown	July 9, 1999	115
16	"A House Divided"	Unknown	July 16, 1999	116
17	"Where the Spirit Lives"	Unknown	July 23, 1999	117
18	"Masquerade"	Unknown	July 30, 1999	118

== Production ==
Though set near Lexington, Kentucky, Legacy was filmed by Atlantis Films Limited near Charles City, Virginia. The theme song for the series is from "The Mummers' Dance" by Loreena McKennitt.

== Awards and nominations ==
Year	Award	Category	Recipient	Result	Refs
1999	Young Artist Awards	Best Performance by a Young Actress in a Drama TV Series	Sarah Rayne	Won	
1999	Young Artist Awards	Best Performance in a TV Drama Series – Supporting Young Actress	Sarah Rayne	Won	
