= Melissa Elias =

Canadian actress

Melissa Elias is a Canadian actress. She stars in the television series Safehaven and Falcon Beach on the Global Television Network and ABC Family. She is in the Lions Gate theatrical picture Tamara (2005). Elias also stars in the dystopian Gen RX distributed by Tricoast Worldwide, winning 2014 California Film Competition at California Film Awards.
