= Scorcher (film) =

- Poster
- Directed by: James Seale
- Written by: Steve Latshaw; Rebecca Morrison
- Produced by: Lisa M. Hansen
- Starring: Mark Dacascos; John Rhys-Davies; Tamara Davies; Mark Rolston; Rutger Hauer
- Music by: Bill Brown
- Production company: CineTel Films
- Distributed by: CineTel Films; Dimension Home Entertainment; Buena Vista Home Entertainment
- Release date: October 4, 2002
- Running time: 87 minutes
- Country: United States
- Language: English

Scorcher is a 2002 science-fiction disaster film directed by James Seale and starring Mark Dacascos, John Rhys-Davies, Jeffrey Johnson, Tamara Davies, Mark Rolston, G.W. Bailey, Thomas F. Duffy, and Rutger Hauer. It was first released in the United States in 2002. It concerns a group of scientists who discover, after a disastrous nuclear accident, that the Earth's tectonic plates are shifting and creating immense pressure that will destroy the Earth in a fiery global eruption, and a few top scientists must find a way to stop it.

== Plot ==
Renegade soldier Colonel Ryan Beckett (Mark Dacascos) is called in by the President of the United States (Rutger Hauer) to save the planet from imminent destruction after a Chinese nuclear-testing accidentally loosens the subterranean plates and exposes the Earth's core, which threatens to bring "Hell on Earth" in just three days.

Beckett assembles a crack team to deliver and detonate not one, but two nuclear bombs that must go off simultaneously in the only place on the planet in which they will do any good at stopping the movement of the plates—Los Angeles. The city is evacuated in a panic, but Beckett's teen daughter (Rayne Marcus) is abducted by a religious-fanatic pyromaniac, and Beckett must save her before he saves the world. Meanwhile, Beckett strikes up a romance with Julie (Tamara Davies), a scientist on his team, who is having a feud with her scientist father (John Rhys-Davies), also on the team.

Also on the squad is the evil Kellaway (Mark Rolston), who hates Beckett so much, he would let the planet blow up just to kill him. In the end, Faith (Beckett's daughter) manages to get her hands on a cell phone and text messages him an SOS. Julie and he head to rescue her, and Beckett kills her insane kidnapper.

They need to find a hole deep enough to drop the device down a few hundred feet, and Faith knows of one in a subway station. They head there, but meanwhile, Kellaway murders the rest of the team (except the pilot, who is waiting at the airport to fly them to safety) and comes to stop them. Beckett ends up throwing him down the shaft with the device.

Beckett, Julie, and Faith head outside and are shocked to find that the pilot of the team has landed a presidential jet in the middle of the road. He was ordered to wait there for Kellaway, and flies them to safety as the two devices go off, destroying Los Angeles and stopping the movement of the plates just before it is too late.

== Cast ==
- Mark Dacascos as Colonel Ryan Beckett
- Tamara Davies as Julie McGrath
- John Rhys-Davies as Dr. Matthew Sallin
- Mark Rolston as Special Agent Kellaway
- Rutger Hauer as President Nelson
- Cathleen Kaelyn as Tara Beckett
- Rayne Marcus as Faith Beckett
- G.W. Bailey as General Timothy Moore
- Thomas F. Duffy as Anderson
- Michael Jace as MacVaughn
- Jeffrey Johnson as Styles
- Billy Maddox as Norris
- Alex Datcher as Janet Hill
- Ivonne Coll as Mayor Salizar
- Josh Hammond as Matt
- Beth Riesgraf as Chrissy
- Sam Lloyd as "Fingers"
- Joel West as "Zero"
