= Jennifer Kydd =

Canadian actress (born 1976)

- Born: 1976 (age 49–50); Halifax, Nova Scotia, Canada
- Years active: 2002-present

Jennifer Kydd (born 1976) is a Canadian actress best known for her role as Paige Bradshaw in the Global series Falcon Beach.

== Biography ==
Kydd was born in 1976 in Halifax, Nova Scotia, grew up in Cole Harbour and later moved to St. Margaret's Bay. She attended Acadia University, where she majored in the Theatre Program. Kydd moved to Toronto in 2002 and then returned to Halifax, Nova Scotia in 2012 where she lives with her husband and 2 kids.

== Filmography ==
- Cry of the Owl (2009) .... Susie Escham (completed)
- The Dresden Files (2 episodes, Unaired Pilot: Storm Front and Storm Front, 2007-2008) .... Grace Cutler
- Falcon Beach (26 episodes, 2006-2007) .... Paige Bradshaw
- General Hospital (1 episode, 2007) .... Lawyer
- Falcon Beach (2005) (TV) .... Paige Bradshaw
- Doc (1 episode, Nip, Tuck and Die, 2004) .... Nurse Carla
- Wild Card (1 episode, Block Party, 2004) .... Woman at Party
- Rush of Fear (2003) (TV) .... Rental Car Agent
- Love That Boy (2003) .... Nikki
- Heart of a Stranger (2002) (TV) .... Waitress
