= Throttle (film) =

- Directed by: James Seale
- Written by: James Seale; Neil Elman
- Produced by: James Seale; Neil Elman
- Starring: Grayson McCouch; Adrian Paul; Amy Locane
- Cinematography: Richard Lerner
- Edited by: James Seale; Peder Morganthaler
- Music by: Neal Acree
- Distributed by: E5 Films LLC
- Release date: August 2, 2005
- Country: United States
- Language: English
- Budget: ~ $50,000
- Box office: ~ $1,000,000

Throttle (also known as No Way Up) is a 2005 American thriller film and a spin-off sequel to Duel (1971). It was directed by James Seale and starring Grayson McCouch. Other cast members include Adrian Paul and Amy Locane. It was filmed entirely in Denver, Colorado.

== Plot ==
Financial analyst Tom Weaver (Grayson McCouch) is a troubled man. He has recently broken off a potential affair with a co-worker named Rebecca. He is also arguing with himself if he wants to continue with a shady ten million dollar business deal with his boss. He has also discovered identical motel keys in his wife, Molly's purse and his boss's car, leading him to believe that she is having an affair. He confronts her about it and she denies this. He lies to her about where he is going and heads to his building to complete the deal to hopefully get himself rich.

Under heavy levels of stress, Tom shouts at the kind old security guard, Eddie, before going into the building. At midnight, Tom goes five levels down in the building's underground parking garage to E-6. Tom argues with his boss about the deal, who tells him that he has gotten in too deep to back out now, as millions would be lost should the process be interrupted. Tom quits the deal and leaves for his car. He tries to call his wife when he discovers that he is too deep in the garage to get service.

Tom discovers that his car has been vandalized and left immobile. He realizes he's not alone. Watching and waiting is a massive, 6000 pound second generation Chevrolet K5 Blazer SUV whose driver sits hidden behind a veil of tinted glass. The driver is a psychotic killer with only one goal: Not letting Tom get out alive. the driver at first taunts him, chasing him, honking the horn, and flashing its lights, and Tom goes to the stairwell. However, it has been chained shut from the inside. Worse yet, the elevators are shut down for the night. Tom finds a co-worker who is leaving and begs for a ride. Frightened, the woman maces him and flees. Armed with only a tire iron, Tom goes into the bathroom to wash the pepper spray out of his eyes, and discovers that the driver has attached a hose to the truck's exhaust pipe, and Tom flees his only safe place, which is quickly filling up with deadly carbon monoxide gas. Tom goes to a nearby truck where the driver appears and tries to mow him down with the truck. He manages to get away from the truck by hiding behind a construction truck. He climbs on top of the construction truck and manages to climb on top of the truck, where he discovers the dead body of the woman who had earlier maced him.

The truck's driver is willing to kill anybody who gets in the way of their goal. Tom realizes that he must outwit his pursuer and escape the garage while trying to figure out who wants him dead before it is too late. The driver realizes that Tom is on top of the car and bucks him into another car, before ramming it into the wall.

Tom manages to flee and discovers a repo man who also sees him as a threat, since he is really a carjacker. The repo man attempts to attack him, but he is thrown onto construction equipment and is impaled on nails. Tom believes the man is the driver, but he was actually the only man who could help him. The carjacker shoots his pistol empty and attempts to tell Tom how he can start the car but he dies before he can get the information out. Tom takes the empty pistol and some other tools and hides in a parked car, which he breaks into using the tools. He then sees Victor, the other security guard who knows his would-be mistress, Rebecca and appears to have a grudge against him. Victor sees the damage and attempts to arrest him, but Tom threatens him, right before Victor is mowed down by the truck. Tom flees and is nearly crushed behind a wall by the truck.

A paranoid and terrified Tom realizes anybody could be a suspect. He escapes and manages to call Eddie on Victor's walkie talkie. He hears a loud crash and the line goes dead, leading him to believe that Eddie too has been killed. He steals a gun from his boss's car and finds his boss, who has been stabbed and tells him that his wife never went through with the affair. He dies right as he tells Tom that he has made sure that he will not be leaving the garage alive. A suspenseful game of cat and mouse ensues as the huge truck chases him through the garage's levels. Tom continues to hide and flee from the truck, before eventually hiding under the truck, which backs into his leg, pinning him to the ground.

The killer is revealed to be Eddie, who realized that Tom was only pretending to like him, when everyone else didn't bother to mask their dislike for him. Combined with his long hours and stress from being lonely, Eddie snapped and killed everyone, saving Tom for last. The garage doors open and Molly comes inside. Tom, despite a broken leg, manages to rescue Molly, who had been bound and gagged inside the toll booth, right before Eddie smashes it with the truck. Eddie is about to run them both down right as the police, whom Tom had called earlier at the top where there was cell phone service, arrive. Tom makes sure Molly is safe before borrowing a police car to finally destroy the truck. He totals the truck, grabs a gun, and prepares to shoot Eddie through the windshield. The police stop this and open the door to discover that Eddie has shot himself. Molly and Tom embrace at the top when Molly asks him, "Where did you park?".
