= Amy Locane =

American actress

- Born: 19 December 1971 (age 54); Trenton, New Jersey, U.S.
- Education: Villa Victoria Academy
- Occupation: Actress
- Years active: 1984–2005; 2009, 2020
- Spouse: Mark Bovenizer (m. 2008; div. 2017)
- Children: 2
- Criminal information
- Status: Released
- Conviction: Vehicular manslaughter
- Penalty: 3 years in prison (released on parole; original sentence); 8 years in prison (eligible for parole after 6 years)

Details
- Date apprehended: December 2010; September 2020

Amy Locane is an American actress known for her role in John Waters' 1990 musical comedy Cry-Baby. In 1992, Locane portrayed Sandy Harling in the first season of the prime time soap opera Melrose Place. She appeared in the 1992 film School Ties alongside Matt Damon and Brendan Fraser, as the object of their affections.

In September 2020, Locane began serving an eight-year sentence for a fatal DUI car crash she caused in 2010. She had previously been sentenced to three years in prison, of which she served two and a half, and was re-sentenced due to the leniency of the original sentence. She was released on December 20, 2024.

== Early life ==
Locane was born in Trenton, New Jersey. The only child of Richard and Helen Locane, Amy was raised by her mother in Lawrence Township, Mercer County, New Jersey. She graduated from Villa Victoria Academy in 1989.

== Career ==
By age 12, she had performed in more than 60 commercials before being cast as a series regular on the sitcom Spencer (1984).

In 1989, Locane made her big screen debut in the independent teen drama film Lost Angels starring opposite Adam Horovitz. The following year, Locane had a lead role opposite Johnny Depp as Allison Vernon-Williams in John Waters' romantic comedy film Cry-Baby. The film was a commercial failure, but has since become a cult classic. She twice played the girlfriend of Brendan Fraser's character, in the films School Ties (1992) and Airheads (1994).

In 1992, Locane was a member of the original cast of the Fox prime time soap opera Melrose Place but left the series after only 13 episodes. She played Jessica Lange's daughter in the 1994 drama film Blue Sky. She played the young lover of Dennis Hopper in the 1996 film Carried Away. In 1997, she starred alongside Ben Affleck and Rose McGowan in Going All the Way and with Jared Leto in Prefontaine. In 1998, she starred in the black comedy Bongwater and fantasy horror Bram Stoker's Legend of the Mummy. Locane returned to television starring in the Christmas movie Ebenezer opposite Jack Palance. Her later credits include The Heist (2001) and Secretary (2002).

== Personal life ==
In 2006, Locane became engaged to businessman Mark Bovenizer and subsequently retired from acting in films. She acted occasionally in local community theater near their Hopewell, New Jersey, home and appeared in two eight-minute shorts released in 2009. They have two daughters, born in 2007 and 2009.

=== DUI car crash and legal issues ===
On June 27, 2010, at 9:05 pm, Locane was involved in a fatal motor vehicle collision in Montgomery, New Jersey. Locane was driving 53 miles per hour (85 km/h) in a 35-mile-per-hour (56 km/h) zone and rapidly closed on the car driven by Fred Seeman, which was traveling at 3 miles per hour (4.8 km/h) as it made a left-hand turn in front of her to enter his driveway. The crash killed Seeman's wife, 60-year-old Helen.

Following the crash, testing revealed Locane's blood alcohol level was .23 percent, nearly three times the limit for legal impairment. In December 2010, Locane was indicted for aggravated manslaughter and assault by automobile. On November 27, 2012, a Somerset County jury convicted Locane of vehicular homicide and assault by auto. On February 14, 2013, she was sentenced to three years in prison for the crime, with Montgomery Superior Court Judge Robert B. Reed imposing less than the minimum five-year sentence due to mitigating factors that included consideration of her children's welfare. Locane served her sentence at Edna Mahan Correctional Facility for Women and was released on parole on June 12, 2015. Late in 2015 following Locane's release from prison, her husband filed for divorce and for custody of their two daughters.

On July 22, 2016, a New Jersey appeals court ruled that the three-year sentencing would be re-reviewed due to what the court felt was an inadequate explanation by Reed for leniency. Upon review, Reed stated in September 2016 that he had erred in his decision and that she should serve an additional six months. On January 13, 2017, however, Reed ruled Locane would not have to go back to prison, saying her conduct since her release indicated she was not a threat to society. Speaking later about the crash and victims, Locane said the memory of Helen Seeman will "be forever in her thoughts." In February 2019, Locane was re-sentenced to five years behind bars but remained free on bail pending an appeal.

On July 22, 2020, an appeals court ruled that a different judge incorrectly re-sentenced Locane in 2019 and sent the case back for another sentencing. The ruling issued also rejected Locane's argument that sentencing her again violates double jeopardy protections since she had already completed her sentence and parole term.

On September 17, 2020, Locane was sentenced to eight years in New Jersey state prison after a judge agreed with prosecutors that Locane's initial sentence was too lenient. New Jersey state law requires Locane to serve more than six years before being eligible for parole. In 2022, Locane lost a federal appeal to have her state prison sentence cut. She was incarcerated at Edna Mahan Correctional Facility for Women. She was released from custody on December 20, 2024. While incarcerated, Ms Locane was able to obtain her Associates Degree from Raritan Valley Community College. According to Remind Magazine, since her release, she currently works at a doctor's office in Princeton, New Jersey.

== Filmography ==
=== Film ===
Year	Title	Role	Notes
1989	Lost Angels	Cheryl Anderson	
1990	Cry-Baby	Allison Vernon-Williams	
1991	No Secrets	Jennifer	
1992	School Ties	Sally Wheeler	
1994	Airheads	Kayla	
1994	Blue Sky	Alex Marshall	Filmed in 1990; Nominated — Young Artist Award for Best Performance by a Young Actress Co-Starring in a Motion Picture
1995	Criminal Hearts	Keli	
1996	Carried Away	Catherine Wheeler	
1997	Going All the Way	Buddy Porter	
1997	Prefontaine	Nancy Alleman	
1997	The Girl Gets Moe	Beth	
1998	Bongwater	Jennifer	
1998	Bram Stoker's Legend of the Mummy	Margaret Trelawny	
1999	Implicated	Ann Campbell	
2001	The Heist	Lucy	
2002	Secretary	Lee's Sister	
2002	Bad Karma	Carly Campbell	
2005	Throttle	Molly Weaver	
2009	Visiting	Julia	Short film
2009	Coffee	Sarah	Short film
2020	Cooties	Christine	Short film

=== Television ===
Year	Title	Role	Notes
1984−1985	Spencer	Andrea Winger	Also known as Under One Roof; Series regular, 13 episodes
1985	Young People's Specials	Karen	Episode: "Narc"
1985	Special Treat	Bridget Frommer	Episode: "Out of Time"
1988	Hothouse	Nancy	3 episodes
1992	Melrose Place	Sandy Louise Harling	Series regular, 13 episodes
1997	End of Summer	Alice	Television film
1998	Ebenezer	Erica Marlowe	Television film
1998	Route 9	Sally Hogan	Television film
1999	Touched by an Angel	Stella	Episode: "The Compass"
2003	Mystery Woman	Tracy Stenning	Television film
2005	Alien Express	Rosie Holden	Television film
