= The Quiet Science =

American Christian music band

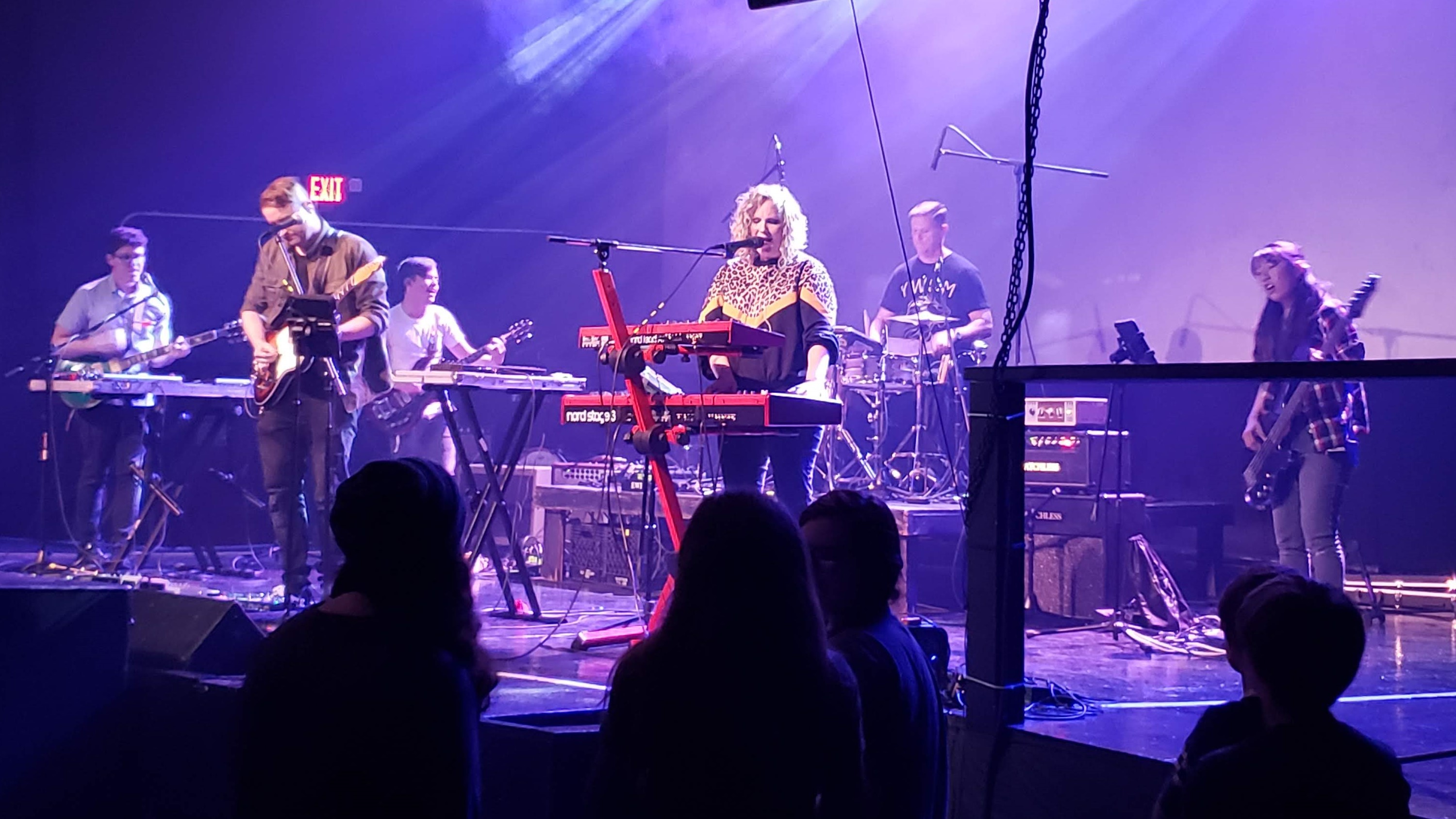
- The Quiet Science at the Murray Hill Theater, Jacksonville, Florida, 2019

Background information
- Origin: Merritt Island, Florida
- Genres: Christian EDM; Christian rock; Christian pop; Christian alternative rock
- Years active: 2008–present
- Members: Nathan Walter; Daisy Walter; Josh Raucci
- Past members: Robert "Robbie" Williamson; Mark Nicks
- Website: thequietscience.com

The Quiet Science are an American Christian music band from Merritt Island, Florida, and they started making music together in 2008. They have released one extended play, He Calls Me Diamonds (2009), and three studio albums, [With/Without] (2010), Dark Words on Dark Wings (2011), and The Rekindling of the Stars (2016).

== Background ==
The band originated in Merritt Island, Florida, in 2008, with the now husband-and-wife centerpiece Mark Nathan Walter and Daisy Elisabeth Walter (née Williamson), and they added two more musicians to the current roster, Mark Nicks and Josh Raucci. Their former band member was Daisy's brother Robert Wesley "Robbie" Williamson.

== Music history ==
Their first extended play, He Calls Me Diamonds, was released on September 2, 2009. The subsequent release, a studio album, [With/Without], was released on May 4, 2010. They released, Dark Words on Dark Wings, on October 25, 2011. The third studio album, The Rekindling of the Stars, was released on May 6, 2016.

== Members ==
=== Current members ===
- Mark Nathan Walter (born January 7, 1980)
- Daisy Elisabeth Walter (born January 10, 1986; née Williamson)
- Josh Raucci

==== Touring members ====
- Joey Osgood (guitar)
- Mark Wallace (drums)
- Rebecca Wallace (bass)

=== Former members ===
- Robert Wesley "Robbie" Williamson (drums)
- Mark Nicks (drums)

==== Former touring members ====
- Joshua Albritton (bass)
- Christopher Calhoun (bass)

== Discography ==
Studio albums

- [With/Without] (May 4, 2010)
- Dark Words on Dark Wings (October 25, 2011)
- The Rekindling of the Stars (May 6, 2016)
- Worship ( April 23, 2021 )

EPs

- He Calls Me Diamonds (September 2, 2009)
