= Showbread Is Showdead =

Studio album by Showbread
- Released: January 8, 2016
- Genre: Christian rock, Christian punk
- Length: 43:19

Showbread chronology
Cancer (2012)	Showbread Is Showdead (2016)	Our Fathers Were Models for God (2023)

Showbread Is Showdead is the eleventh and formerly final studio album from Showbread. They released the album on January 8, 2016.

== Critical reception ==
Professional ratings
Review scores
Source	Rating
HM Magazine	4.5/5 stars
Jesus Freak Hideout	5/5 stars 4/5 stars 4.5/5 stars

Taylor Weston, allotting the album four and a half stars by HM Magazine, recognizes, "Showbread Is Showdead, tips a courteous hat towards the band’s history, before injecting a fresh dose of adrenaline and entering into uncharted territory. Featuring members old, current and new, it’s more than a worthy effort." Awarding the album five stars at Jesus Freak Hideout, Scott Fryberger writes, "Showbread Is Showdead is a stellar way to end a bizarre, yet amazing, career in the music industry". Christopher Smith, rating the album four stars from Jesus Freak Hideout, states, "Showbread may be showdead after 2016, but their raw rock will kill forever and ever." Giving the album four and a half stars for Jesus Freak Hideout, describes, "Showbread's final hurrah is one you'll definitely want to hear."

== Track listing ==
No.	Title	Length
1.	"I Am Horrible at Processing Rejection"	4:03
2.	"January 3, 1889: Nietzsche Witnesses the Flogging of a Horse"	5:43
3.	"Why Shouldn't We Kill Ourselves?"	3:06
4.	"Harry Harlow and the Monkeys of Despair"	1:56
5.	"Raw Rock Theology"	2:48
6.	"My Shadow Is a Bat"	3:23
7.	"Dear John Piper (Stillbirth in Space)"	4:05
8.	"Legacy of Skubalon"	3:33
9.	"Nine Weeks, Four Days: The Fetus Develops Teeth"	3:18
10.	"Showbread Is Showdead"	4:42
11.	"Life After Life After Death"	6:46
Total length:		43:19
