= Nervosa =

Studio album by Showbread
- Released: May 13, 2008
- Recorded: 2007
- Genre: Art rock, electronic rock, industrial, post-hardcore, screamo
- Length: 49:20
- Label: Tooth and Nail
- Producer: Showbread

Showbread chronology
Anorexia (2008)	Nervosa (2008)	The Fear of God (2009)

Professional ratings
Review scores
Source	Rating
AbsolutePunk.net	(83%)
Jesus Freak Hideout	4.5/5 stars

Nervosa is an album by the band Showbread. It was released on May 13, 2008, simultaneously with its companion album Anorexia. Nervosa second in a two-CD collection entitled Anorexia Nervosa, which is an accompaniment to the short story Anorexia Nervosa which comes packaged within the records. The album acts as a soundtrack to a read-along story book that features a chapter for each track. As the reader follows the story, the album reacts to what happens within the text. Taking a drastic new direction from their second album Age of Reptiles, which featured a more straightforward alternative rock sound, the band took "Nervosa" in a much darker, industrial rock tone.

== Story ==
The album and included booklet tell the story of a woman named Nervosa who begins her story by taking a job at The 120 Days Of Sodom (named from the controversial novel of the same name by Marquis de Sade) which is a combination strip club and slaughterhouse. The 120 Days Of Sodom has two floors, a killing floor and a dance floor above it. The dance floor features a transparent bottom so that visitors to the strip club can see through to the killing floor where animals are being slaughtered. Like her sister Anorexia, Nervosa's story takes place within two texts. The first section of each chapter tells Nervosa's story in a more stylized, fairy tale-esque and metaphorical manner. Within this text, Nervosa spends the story laboring to dig a hole as deeply as possible, which parallels her quest to reach the depths of human depravity. The subsequent text in each chapter is narrated by Nervosa herself, and takes place in real time in the actual world. One evening while giving a private dance, Nervosa is assaulted, beaten and raped. She later learns she has become pregnant as a result of the rape and seeks an unsafe abortion. At this point in the story, the real time narrative ceases and the remaining chapters are carried exclusively through metaphorical means. Nervosa, broken and dying within her deep hole she has dug, wakes in a sunlit field and finds that she has been carried to safety by a small lamb who died in the process of rescuing her. The lamb however, resurrects and explains that he had given his life to save Nervosa simply to fulfill his lifelong desire to be with her.

== Track listing ==
All tracks are written by Josh Dies and Showbread, except where noted.

No.	Title	Writer(s)	Length
1.	"The Journey" (featuring Soul Glow Activatur of Family Force 5)		3:36
2.	"The Vulture"		3:35
3.	"The Sky"		3:27
4.	"The Dirt"		4:28
5.	"The Dirt (Alpha)"		4:58
6.	"The Pig"		3:17
7.	"The Flies"		5:07
8.	"The Goat" (featuring Ivory Mobley and Jeff Fortson)		5:53
9.	"The Death"		3:33
10.	"The End"		1:26
11.	"The End (Omega)"		2:21
12.	"The Beginning" (featuring Reese Roper)	Reese Roper	7:38
Total length:			49:19

== Personnel ==
Showbread

- Josh Dies - lead vocals, guitar
- Patrick Porter - bass
- Mike Jensen - guitar
- Matt Davis - guitar
- John Giddens - synthesizer
- Ricky Holbrook - drums

Additional musicians

- Solomon "Soul Glow Activatur" Olds — guest vocals on track 1
- Ivory Mobley — guest vocals on track 8
- Jeff Fortson — guest vocals on track 8
- Reese Roper — guest vocals on track 12
