= Talons (EP) =

EP by DIES
- Released: 2009
- Genre: Raw Rock Industrial Electronic
- Length: 23:00
- Label: Self-released

DIES chronology
Aesthetics of Violence (2007)	Talons (2009)

Talons is the first solo EP recorded by Josh Dies. The album was released under DIES. The EP contains "re-imaginings" of two Showbread songs: "Never An Oceanographer" and "Age of Insects". A cover of the Sullivan song, "Dig Me Up" is also present on the EP.

== Track listing ==
1. "Brundle Fly" 0:44
2. "You're So Stupid" 3:05
3. "Dig Me Up" 4:04
4. "Never An Oceanographer" 4:09
5. "Talons" 4:33
6. "Age of Insects" 4:02
7. "24 Hours" 2:27

== Production mistakes ==
Back Cover of the album, picturing the typo.

On the track listing, "Never An Oceanographer" is misprinted as "Never An Oceangrpaher."
