= Grayson McCouch =

American actor

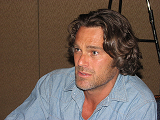
- McCouch at the 2009 As the World Turns fan luncheon in New York City
- Born: October 29, 1968 (age 56); New York City, New York, U.S.
- Education: Hamilton College (BA)
- Occupation: Actor
- Years active: 1993–present

Grayson Jonathan McCouch (born October 29, 1968) is an American actor. He is known for his roles as Morgan Winthrop on the daytime soap opera Another World and Dusty Donovan in the daytime soap opera As the World Turns. He also starred as Don Masters on the Nick at Nite family drama Hollywood Heights.

== Early life and education ==
McCouch was born in New York City and raised in Chappaqua, New York, the son of Rina (Plotnik), a musician, and Donald Grayson McCouch, a banker. His mother is Israeli and served in the Israel Defense Forces.

McCouch graduated from Kent School in Kent, Connecticut, in 1987 and received his Bachelor of Arts degree in theater from Hamilton College. He later studied at the British American Drama Academy through a Yale University-sponsored study abroad program.

== Career ==
McCouch spent four seasons with the Williamstown Theater Festival where he performed in Arturo UI, The Visit, Threepenny Opera, A Midsummer Night's Dream, Inherit the Wind and The Moon Stone. While in London, he performed in Electra at the Almeida Theater and Women Beware Women at the Royal Court.

McCouch got his start on television as Dr. Morgan Winthrop on Another World in 1993. After moving to Los Angeles, the actor starred as Sean Logan on Legacy (1998–99). He played Dr. Mitchell Grace on All Souls (April 2001 – August 2001). Other appearances include Beverly Hills, 90210, The Cosby Mysteries, and The Agency. In 2003, McCouch landed the role as Dusty Donovan on As the World Turns, a role for which he earned a Daytime Emmy nomination for in 2006 for the Supporting Actor category.

His film credits include the role of Gruber in Armageddon (1998), Airtight (1999), and Momentum (2003). In 2014, McCouch portrayed the doomed Thomas Wayne in the pilot episode of Gotham. He currently resides in New York City.

== Filmography ==
Film
Year	Title	Role	Notes
1998	Armageddon	Gruber	
2005	Throttle	Tom Weaver	

Television
Year	Title	Role	Notes
1992–1996	Another World	Dr. Morgan Winthrop	50 episodes
1994	Related by Birth	Henry	Television film
1995	The Cosby Mysteries	Felix Cross	Episode: "Comic Book Murder"
1997	Sins of the Mind	Roger	Television film
1997	Beverly Hills, 90210	Larry Lincoln	Episode: "Phantom of CU"
1998–1999	Legacy	Sean Logan	18 episodes
1999	Forbidden Island	—	Episode: "Pilot"
1999	Airtight	Rat Lucci	Television film
2001	All Souls	Dr. Mitchell Grace	5 episodes
2002	The Agency	Omar	Episode: "The Plague Year"
2003	Momentum	Zachary Shefford	Television film
2003–2010	As the World Turns	Dusty Donovan	612 episodes
2008	The Apostles	Iron Mike Brinjak	Television film
2012	Hollywood Heights	Don Masters	20 episodes
2014–2019	Gotham	Dr. Thomas Wayne	4 episodes
2015	General Hospital	Kyle Sloane	20 episodes
