= Anorexia (album) =

Studio album by Showbread
- Released: May 13, 2008
- Recorded: 2007
- Genre: Art rock, electronic, industrial, post-hardcore, screamo
- Length: 42:38
- Label: Tooth and Nail
- Producer: Randy Torres

Showbread chronology
| Age of Reptiles (2006) | Anorexia (2008) | Nervosa (2008) |

Professional ratings
Review scores
| Source | Rating |
|---|---|
| AbsolutePunk.net | (84%) |
| Jesus Freak Hideout | 4.5/5 stars |

Anorexia is an album by the band Showbread. It was released on May 13, 2008 simultaneously with its companion album Nervosa. Anorexia is the first of a two-CD collection entitled Anorexia Nervosa, which is an accompaniment to the short story Anorexia Nervosa which comes packaged with the records. The album acts as a soundtrack to a read-along story book that features a chapter for each track. As the reader follows the story, the album reacts to what happens within the text. Taking a drastic new direction from their second album Age of Reptiles, which featured a more straightforward alternative rock sound, the band took "Anorexia" in a much darker, Industrial rock tone.

== Story ==
The album and included booklet tell the story of a woman named Anorexia who begins her story by opening a center for sick and dying children. Like her sister Nervosa, Anorexia's story takes place within two texts. The first section of each chapter tells Anorexia's story in a more stylized, fairy tale-esque and metaphorical manner. Within this text, Anorexia spends the story laboring to build a tower to Heaven which parallels her quest to be remembered for her children's hospital. The subsequent text in each chapter is narrated by Anorexia herself, and takes place in real time in the actual world. While Anorexia's motives seem noble, we learn as the story continues that she is driven by a sinister, selfish desire to become immortalized and praised for her "good deeds". One night while treating a child with an unnamed illness (presumably the HIV virus), Anorexia is stabbed with a dirty syringe and infected with the same illness. As Anorexia is weakened by the disease, she becomes more infamous and her tower to Heaven becomes taller. But on her death bed she finds no solace and realizes that her great tower is merely a shallow bed of stones only feet from the ground. At this point in the story, the real time narrative ceases and the remaining chapters are carried exclusively through metaphorical means. Anorexia, dying on her bed of stones, wakes in a sunlit field and finds that she has been carried to safety by a small lamb who died in the process of rescuing her. The lamb however, resurrects and explains that he had given his life to save Anorexia simply to fulfill his lifelong desire to be with her.

== Track listing ==
All songs written by Josh Dies.

1. "The Journey" - 3:34
2. "The Vulture" - 3:49
3. "The Sky" - 3:18
4. "The Sky (Alpha)" - 3:22
5. "The Dirt" - 2:38
6. "The Pig" - 4:58
7. "The Flies" - 3:11
8. "The Goat" - 3:43
9. "The Death" - 4:15
10. "The End" - 3:56 (featuring Ivory Mobley)
11. "The End (Omega)" - 1:04
12. "The Beginning" - 4:51

== Personnel ==
- Josh Dies - Lead Vocals, Guitar, programming
- Patrick Porter - Bass
- Mike Jensen - Guitar
- Matt Davis - Guitar
- John Giddens - Synthesizer, programming
- Ricky Holbrook - Drums

Production

- Randy Torres - producer, engineering
- Steven Dail - engineering
- Ulrich Wild - mixing, mastering
- Ryan Clark (musician) - design

Additional musicians

- Aaron Miasko - drum technical, percussion
- Lori Gerlach - string arrangements, piano
- Randy Torres - piano
