= Brundlefly (band) =

Canadian alternative rock/pop band

- Origin: Vancouver, British Columbia, Canada
- Genres: Alternative rock, Pop music
- Years active: 1996–2002
- Members: Ian Somers; Shane Turner; Glenn Delukas; Chris Copeland; Graham Tuson; Jeff Dawson

Brundlefly was a Canadian alternative rock and pop music band active from 1996 to 2002.

== History ==
Brundlefly was formed by Ian Somers (vocals, guitar), Shane Turner (bass), Glenn Delukas (guitar), and Chris Copeland (drums). Turner and Delukas would leave the band and be replaced by guitarist Jeff Dawson and bassist and vocalist Graham Tuson. The band played in local clubs for four years before independently releasing an album, Locked in this House, in 2000.

The band toured around Canada, then, in 2002, released a second album, By the Way, on the Tonic label. Two of the band's recordings were produced by Todd Simko. The band broke up that same year.

== Discography ==
- Locked in this House (1999)
- By the Way (2002)
