= Showbread (band) =

American Christian hardcore band

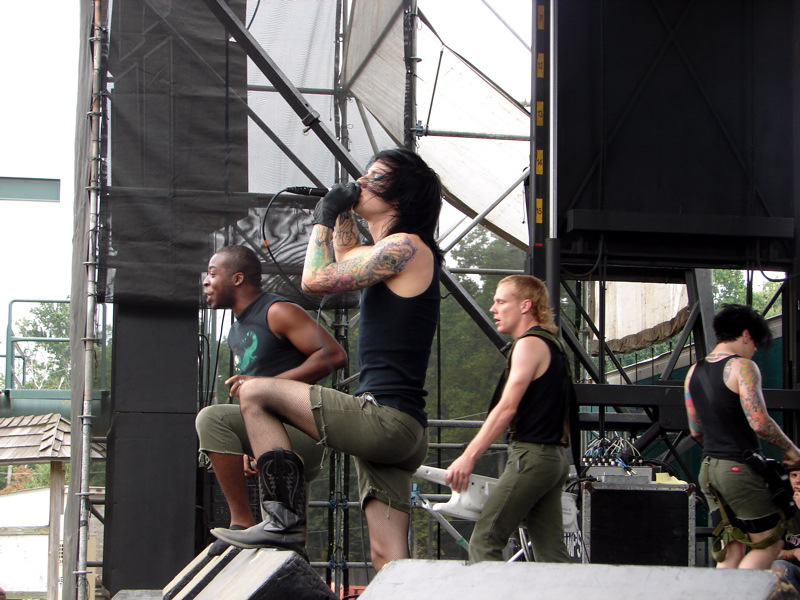
- Showbread performing in 2006

Background information
- Origin: Guyton, Georgia, U.S.
- Genres: Screamo; hardcore punk; alternative rock; post-hardcore; metalcore; sass
- Years active: 1997–2016, 2020–present
- Labels: Come&Live!, Tooth & Nail, Steel Roots, Coastal Rock
- Members: Josh Dies; Ivory Mobley; John Giddens; Matt Davis; Mike Jensemble; Patrick Porter; Marvin Reilly
- Past members: Drew Porter; Garret Holmes; Landon Ginnings; Ryan Peterson; Travis Riner
- Website: showbread.net

Showbread is an American Christian hardcore band formed in Guyton, Georgia, in 1997. The group has gone through a number of lineup changes since its initial formation, but maintains its two core members, Josh Dies and Patrick Porter. The group built an underground fanbase in the late 1990s and early 2000s through word-of-mouth exposure and frequent touring. In 2004, the band signed with Tooth & Nail Records and released their major-label debut, No Sir, Nihilism Is Not Practical. In 2010, the band left Tooth & Nail and joined Come&Live!, an independent record label that releases music via free downloads.

Throughout their career, the band has been subject to much controversy among Christian listeners, over their lyrical themes and personal lifestyles. The members of Showbread have labeled their musical sound as "Raw Rock". According to former guitarist Matt Davis, the band's name comes from "a biblical reference that Jesus used to show how Christianity isn't so much about rules but about love."

Showbread released their final album, Our Fathers Were Models For God, on November 15, 2022.

== History ==
The band was formed in 1997 by Patrick Porter and Travis Riner, as a worship band for the Southern Baptist church they attended. Their church ultimately asked them to leave when they started playing music the church viewed as Satanic. Eventually, Patrick's younger brother Josh joined the band, serving as the lead vocalist and primary songwriter after starting as the drummer.

The band went through line-up changes, including the addition of Eddie Ortiz as vocalist, and began playing local and regional shows, which garnered the attention of musicians in other Georgia-based Christian rock bands. It was through these meetings that the additions of Mike Jensen (guitar), Matt Davis (guitar), and John Giddens (synthesizer) took place. Ortiz left the group in 2001 but does appear as vocalist, and is credited, on the independently produced and released record The Dissonance of Discontent and plays guitars on the album "Goodbye Is Forever", he returned briefly to tour and run merchandise for the band in 2004. With their new line-up, Showbread toured independent of management, booking agents, and record labels for two years before signing to Tooth & Nail / Solid State Records in 2004.

=== Tooth & Nail Records and No Sir, Nihilism Is Not Practical (2004–2005) ===
Bassist Patrick Porter with Showbread in concert at the Roxy in Atlanta on August 10, 2005

Showbread played at the Cornerstone Festival in summer of that year and quickly gained a strong following. In fall 2004, they released their debut album for Tooth & Nail Records, titled No Sir, Nihilism Is Not Practical. No Sir was produced by Sylvia Massy, who has also worked with Prince, Tool, and Johnny Cash.

=== Age of Reptiles (2006) ===
Showbread's Age of Reptiles, was released on August 1, 2006. On this album, Showbread departed drastically from the spastic, screeching style of their previous albums, to a more alternative rock sound, while keeping with their trademark lyrical style and keytar. Also produced by Sylvia Massy, it was recorded in Weed, California at RadioStar Studios.

=== Ivory's departure and Anorexia Nervosa (2007–2008) ===
On March 4, 2007, Showbread posted on their official website that they would be writing a new record in the spring that they hope to record in the fall and release in 2008. This would later be known as a tease for Anorexia and Nervosa.

Showbread announced on April 2, 2007, that Ivory Mobley would be leaving the band in May, his last show being Cornerstone Florida. Ivory then later rejoined the band several times. Two months later, on July 13, 2007, they announced that they asked drummer Justin Oblinger to step down from the band. Oblinger was replaced by Ricky Holbrook, the former drummer of Our Heart's Hero.

On May 1, 2007, the band's blog became home to bizarre videos and messages filled with codes and hidden messages leading to more clues and hidden messages about the band's new record. Fans worked together to connect the puzzle pieces that they believe coincide with the new album. Anorexia Nervosa was announced by the band to be released May 13, 2008. The "album" was released as two separate albums, one called Anorexia and the other Nervosa.

Soon after the joint-release of Anorexia and Nervosa and shortly before the start of the band's "You Can't Save Yourself Tour", John "JG" Giddens, the keytar player, left the band to pursue other interests. Guitarist Matt Davis also left around this time, however Josh decided against announcing his departure. Matt Davis's guitar role was replaced by Landon Ginnings, also known by Landon D. Mise (formerly of The Wedding) for the tour and JG's by Garrett Holmes. Both members were released after they completed the tour, but returned in 2009.

=== The Fear of God (2009) ===
On August 11, 2009, Showbread released the album The Fear of God. Recording began in April at RadioStar Studios in Weed, California. Frontman Josh Dies said:

This is a record we've wanted to make for a long time but in the past we've had so many opinions in the band that made it difficult. It's about energy, and passion, and aggression. It has a punk rock spirit to it ... There are elements of all the Showbread styles involved, but put together in a new and interesting way ... It isn't about trying to be anything but raw and just letting it all come out.

=== Come&Live! and Who Can Know It? (2010–2011) ===
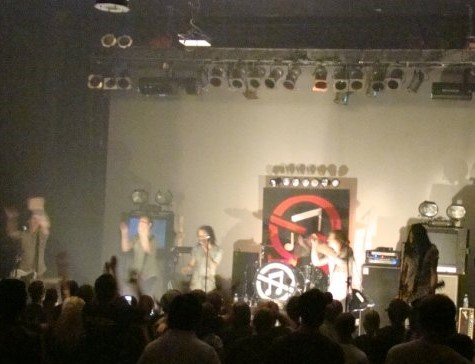
Showbread in Jacksonville, Florida.

On March 29, 2010, Showbread announced signing with independent label Come&Live!. The band stated, "At this point in our lives as Showbread, we have decided to withdraw from many elements of the industry that have been a part of our band for years, sign with Come&Live! and trust God to provide ways for us to offer our music and our performances as free gifts in order to expand the scope of our ministry." As "musicinaries" the band relies completely on donations from supporters to fund recordings, tours, and basic sustenance.

2010 also marked the departure of guitarists Mike Jensen and Landon Ginnings, with the band continuing as a four-piece.

Showbread created a Kickstarter account for the purpose of funding the debut Come&Live! album on May 17. Their original goal was to raise $13,000 by August 14, so they could record the album. On May 26, they made that goal. By the end of the fundraiser, they raised $33,322. The rest of the money was used for other purposes, such as the upcoming free tour.

On September 21, 2010, Showbread headed down to Weed, California to record the album with Rich Veltrop and Sylvia Massy Shivy at Radio Star Studios. During the recording session, August 10, Showbread announced on their website that the album was going to be titled, "Who Can Know It?". The band shot a lot of footage from this recording session. They compiled all of the videos and released it as a DVD titled it "Showbread: An Awful Void". This video also available to stream on the band's official YouTube channel, as of March 2014.

"Who Can Know It?" was released on November 16, 2010, through Come&Live!. The album was released in multiple versions. Besides the free digital download through the Come&Live! website, they put out three different physical copies, the standard edition, the special edition, and the vinyl edition.

In February 2011, Josh Dies released a book titled "The Joke That We Play on the World." The book is a biography of the band's history from their beginnings up until the end of 2010. The book contains makings of albums, tours, faith, funny moments, biographies of each band member, past and present, some interviews and articles. The book also contained a digital photo album, which has photos of the band past and present, such as photos of the original lineup.

Showbread were a part of four tours in 2011. From mid-February to April 2011, Showbread went on their first free national tour, "Raw Rock Theology 2011". At the beginning of the summer Showbread hopped on the second leg of the "Ad Astra Per Aspera Record Release Tour" with Abandon Kansas, Quiet Science, and The Wedding. In mid-summer, the band was a part of "Arrows Are Deadly: Missional Tour" with Ascend the Hill, White Collar Sideshow, and The Ember Days. In the fall, Showbread embarked on a headlining European tour called "Showbread Goes To Europe" with Safemode and The Spirit That Guides Us.

On November 12, 2011, Showbread released their debut remix album titled "Who Can Unknow It?" which is only available as a digital copy through their online store.

=== Cancer (2011–2015) ===
During the month of September 2011, there were posts on Showbread's Formspring talking about plans for a new concept album. On October 25, 2011, an article from Radio U came out giving small detail regarding a new album. In the interview Josh Dies stated, "[The album is] in developmental stages right now... But what we're doing is a science fiction concept album called Cancer."

Showbread is planning to commemorate the 10th anniversary of their debut album, No Sir, Nihilism is Not Practical, with a live performance of the album on August 9, 2014, in Portland, Oregon, with the 2004 album lineup: Matt Davis, Josh Dies, John Giddens, Mike Jensen, Ivory Mobley, Patrick Porter, and Marvin Reilly.

On June 3, 2015, Josh Dies appeared on the Broken Light podcast to discuss Showbread, his writing, and church planting. He discussed the history of the band within the changing landscape of the music industry, and lamented over the ambitious approach to Cancer, and a film that was supposed to accompany the album. While happy with the album itself, he remarked on how the attempt at fulfilling an overly ambitious vision with the movie had stagnated the band's ability to tour or create further albums and left them in a perpetual limbo. He also hinted that the end of Showbread would be coming once the Cancer film fiasco had come to a close, and that the band hopes to release at least one more album before calling it quits.

=== Showbread Is Showdead (2016) ===
Showbread's next album, Showbread Is Showdead, was released on January 8, 2016, with the original lineup from No Sir, Nihilism is Not Practical. The only physical edition of the album was released in vinyl. Along with the album release, Showbread also released a documentary entitled The Music Is Dead and the Cancer movie.

On June 21, 2016, the band announced their final show as Showbread.

=== Post-Breakup (2020-present) ===
On March 7, 2021, the band announced a reunion show to be played at Furnace Fest on September 26.

In November 2022, Showbread released a new album, Our Fathers Were Models For God, in concert with Josh Dies's new book Death To Deconstruction: Reclaiming Faithfulness as an Act of Rebellion.

In February 2023, Furnace Fest announced that Showbread will be playing their music festival on September 22, 2023.

== Traits ==
Showbread is known for giving ridiculous statements in the press and in interviews. Most interviews, regardless of purpose, vary from light hearted nonsense to outright absurdity, becoming serious only when answering questions dealing with their faith. They have made multiple absurd claims, ranging from the accusations that Blindside's members are vampire, werewolf, and zombie hunters, to accusations that Pillar's band members are made of grass clippings. Despite the nature of a number of these statements, it appears they were meant to be taken in a light-hearted manner.

Very open with their Christianity, the group has even been known to point out that the only serious things they will say during their set are those that deal with their beliefs. Showbread also gives whimsical names to their headlining tours like "Kings Of Krunk" and "To'...Fo' Sho'" and even reportedly suggested that their 2006 tour with the band Roses Are Red be titled "Dookie Eaters Anonymous," due to a recurring joke between vocalists Mobley and Porter.

They are known for wearing matching outfits when performing to promote their albums, such as red and black for No Sir, Nihilism Is Not Practical, black and green for Age of Reptiles, Doctor and Nurse outfits for Anorexia and Nervosa, and army shirts for The Fear of God.

== Ideological views ==
Showbread openly advocate Christian pacifism and anarchism, criticize patriotism as idolatry, boycott all companies that use sweatshops, all members are freewill theists, some subscribe to open theism and all members are teetotalers.

== Controversies ==
Despite their open statements concerning their Christian faith, Showbread has endured intense criticism from some Christians who feel certain aspects of their music to be offensive and repugnant in terms of Christian morality.

In 2006, a fan-made video for the song "Dead By Dawn", featured on YouTube, was seen by the band and posted on their own site. In turn, this video was misinterpreted by some as an actual Showbread music video which brought attention to the subject matter and lyrics of "Dead By Dawn". Certain Christian groups retaliated on web forums calling the band "satanic" and insisting that "the only reason these degenerates should be allowed in a church is if it is to get them saved". The album, No Sir, Nihilism Is Not Practical, was even briefly pulled from some Christian music retailers in the wake of the backlash. However, upon further investigation of the accusations and those that made them, the album was restocked and the controversy dismissed. After a period of silence, on September 7, 2006, the band reposted (after their website crashed) a statement on their site discussing the debate between Christian morality and secular media in defense of their music and the beliefs they stand for. From the statement, Josh Porter concluded with:

Showbread is a Christian band. As I tell you from the stage in dark musty concert venues each night, dressed in silly outfits, covered in sweat and in a tired voice. This means that we as a band believe in Jesus Christ, we believe the Bible to be the living word of God, we believe in love.

Despite their blatant evangelical and biblical messages, Showbread's albums Anorexia and Nervosa were banned from Christian retail outlets because of the overall "dark" nature of much of the story and scenes involving rape, animal cruelty and abortion.

In late July/August 2009, not long before the release of The Fear of God, the band was the subject of controversy among certain Catholics who found the band's depiction of a pope on the album cover to be offensive. Josh Dies addressed these concerns on the band's Wordpress blog.

== Side projects ==
Members of the band, both past and present, are involved in different side projects.

- Current vocalist Josh Dies has a solo career under the name DIES, which focuses on industrial music. He has three releases: Aesthetics of Violence (2007), Talons EP (2009), and Scalene (2011).
- Current vocalist Josh Dies and bassist Patrick Porter are involved in a side project with Five Iron Frenzy vocalist Reese Roper entitled "The Thieves Guild". The group has not released any known albums, nor have they performed any live shows.
- Current and former members are involved in a horror punk band named "Knife to Meet You". They released a demo entitled Three Track Demo Tape in 2009.
- Josh Dies is involved in another side project called The Bell Jar.
- Josh Dies formed a new project, after the disbanding of Showbread, called Church of Agony, who have released a Christmas EP.

== Band members ==
Current members

- Josh Dies – vocals (1998–2016, 2020–present), guitar (1997–2008, 2009–2016), synthesizer (1997–2016),) drums (1997–1998, 2012–2016)
- Ivory Mobley – vocals (1997–2008; 2016, 2020–present)
- Mike Jensen – guitar (2001–2010; 2016)
- Landon Ginnings – guitar (2008–2009; 2016, 2020–present)
- Patrick Porter – bass (1997–2016, 2020–present), guitar (1997–2001, 2010–2016)
- John Giddens – Keytar (2003–2008, 2020–present)
- Marvin Reilly – drums (1997–2005, 2020–present)

Former members

- Emmett Belagorska – vocals (1997)
- Casey Belagorska – vocals (1997)
- Eddie Ortiz – vocals and guitar (1997–2001)
- Travis Riner – guitar (1997–2001)
- Matt Davis – guitar (2001–2008)
- Garrett Holmes – guitar, synthesizer (2008–2016)
- Davy Minor – bass (1997)
- Chris Nunnaly – synthesizer (1997–2003)
- Frank Charles Lipari - drums (2002 - 2004)
- Justin "Big O" Oblinger – drums (2006–2007)
- Ricky Holbrook – drums (2007–2009)
- Drew Porter – drums (2009–2012)
- Ryan Peterson – drums (2016)

Timeline

== Discography ==
Studio albums

- The Dissonance of Discontent (1998)
- Goodbye is Forever (1999)
- Life, Kisses, and Other Wasted Efforts (2003)
- No Sir, Nihilism Is Not Practical (2004)
- Age of Reptiles (2006)
- Anorexia/Nervosa (2008)
- The Fear of God (2009)
- Who Can Know It? (2010)
- Cancer (2012)
- Showbread Is Showdead (2016)
- Our Fathers Were Models for God (2023)
