= No Sir, Nihilism Is Not Practical =

Studio album by Showbread
- Released: October 19, 2004
- Recorded: 2004
- Genres: Alternative rock, emo, hardcore punk, screamo, sass
- Length: 54:17
- Label: Solid State
- Producer: Sylvia Massy

Showbread chronology
Life, Kisses, and other Wasted Efforts (2003)	No Sir, Nihilism Is Not Practical (2004)	Age of Reptiles (2006)

Professional ratings
Review scores
Source	Rating
AbsolutePunk.net	(76%)
Allmusic	3/5 stars
Jesus Freak Hideout	4/5 stars

No Sir, Nihilism Is Not Practical is the fourth album by the band Showbread. A music video was made for the song "Mouth Like A Magazine".

== Track listing ==
All songs written by Josh Dies.

1. "A Llama Eats a Giraffe (And Vice Versa)" – 3:51
2. "Dead By Dawn" – 3:54
3. "Mouth Like a Magazine" – 4:12
4. "If You Like Me Check Yes, If You Don't I'll Die" – 3:20
5. "Sampsa Meets Kafka" – 1:10
6. "So Selfish It's Funny" – 4:28
7. "The Missing Wife" – 4:47
8. "Welcome to Plainfield Tobe Hooper" – 3:17
9. "And the Smokers And Children Shall Be Cast Down" – 5:07
10. "Stabbing Art To Death" (featuring Reese Roper) – 6:46
11. "The Dissonance of Discontent" 3:00
12. "Matthias Replaces Judas" (featuring Reese Roper) – 5:03
13. "The Bell Jar" – 5:19

== Personnel ==
Showbread

- Matt Davis – guitar
- Josh Dies – lead vocals, guitar, synthesizer, programming
- John Giddens – synthesizer
- Mike Jensen – guitar
- Ivory Mobley – lead vocals
- Patrick Porter – bass
- Marvin Reilly – drums

Additional musicians

- Reese Roper – vocals
- Sylvia Massy Shivy – vocals, Mellotron, theremin

Production:

- Troy Glessner – mastering
- Sylvia Massy Shivy – producer, mixing
- David Stuart – photography
- Rich Veltrop – engineering

== Reception ==
In 2004, Revolver Magazine called No Sir, Nihilism Is Not Practical, "Best Post-Hardcore Album of the Year".
