= Age of Reptiles (album) =

Studio album by Showbread
- Released: August 1, 2006
- Recorded: 2006
- Genre: Electronic rock, hard rock, pop rock, post-punk, post-grunge, Southern rock
- Length: 42:52
- Label: Tooth & Nail
- Producer: Sylvia Massy

Showbread chronology
No Sir, Nihilism Is Not Practical (2004)	Age of Reptiles (2006)	Anorexia (2008)

Professional ratings
Review scores
Source	Rating
AllMusic	3.5/5 stars
Jesus Freak Hideout	4/5 stars
Cross Rhythms	9/10 stars

Age of Reptiles is an album by the band Showbread. It was released on August 1, 2006. It sold over 4,000 copies in its first week making it the first, and so far only, Showbread album to chart on the Billboard 200, peaking at position #198. The album was recorded in Weed, California at RadioStar Studios with producer Sylvia Massy and engineer Rich Veltrop.

== Reaction of Fans ==
Upon its release, the album ignited a controversy among fans of Showbread's previous record, "No Sir, Nihilism Is Not Practical." The songs containing less of a "spastic" sound and less screaming vocals left fans of the hardcore music genre disappointed. Other Showbread fans maintain that it is their best work to date. On August 8, 2006, the band responded with a statement on their official website. Oh! Emetophobia! was first performed at the Underground Cafe in Roseville, California sometime in March 2006.

== Track listing ==
All songs written by Josh Dies.

1. "Naked Lunch" 2:59
2. "Pachycephalosaurus" 4:04
3. "Your Owls Are Hooting" 3:57
4. "Oh! Emetophobia!" 3:29
5. "Sing Me To Sleep" 4:07
6. "George Romero Will Be At Our Wedding" 3:22
7. "The Jesus Lizard" 3:22
8. "Centipede Sisters" 2:32
9. "Dinosaur Bones"4:24
10. "Age of Reptiles" 10:36
- The song "Age of Reptiles" ends at minute 6:38. After 10 seconds of waning sound, begins at 6:48 the hidden track "Age of Insects". This hidden song ends at minute 10:26 and other 10 seconds of waning sound close the album.

== Personnel ==
- Josh Dies - Lead Vocals, Guitar
- Ivory Mobley - Lead Vocals
- Patrick Porter - Bass
- Mike Jensen - Guitar
- Matt Davis - Guitar
- John Giddens - Synthesizer
- Marvin Reilly - Drums

== Production Mistakes ==
On the lyrics section, the lyrics to "George Romero Will Be At Our Wedding" are printed twice.

On the track listing, 'The Jesus Lizard' and 'Centipede Sisters' are switched in order.

On iTunes, many of the tracks are mislabeled—the titles for "Oh! Emetophobia!" and "Sing Me To Sleep" are switched, track 7 is incorrectly labeled as "Mouth Like A Magazine" (a song from the band's previous album), and the tracks after track 7 are mislabeled as "The Jesus Lizard", "Centipede Sisters", and "Dinosaur Bones."
