= Clover Roscoe =

American screenwriter and newspaper editor

Clover Roe Roscoe (pen name Clover Leist; October 8, 1880 - February 24, 1944) was an American screenwriter, fiction writer, and newspaper editor.

== Biography ==
Born in Detroit, Michigan, Roscoe was the daughter of writer Grace Duffie Boylan and the half-sister of screenwriter Malcolm Stuart Boylan. She married Howard D. Smiley in 1899, divorcing in 1901.

Roscoe died at the age of 64 of cerebral arteriosclerosis in Manor Hall, a sanitarium formerly located in the Harvard Heights neighborhood of Los Angeles.

== Career ==
=== Society reporting ===
Under the name "Clover Leist", Roscoe wrote and illustrated "My Painted Thoughts of Glad, Sad, Bad New York" for the Chicago Examiner, published 7 August 1910, an example of her society reporting during the era.

"And now comes Miss Clover Leist--yes, that's her real name--with her "Painted Thoughts." Miss Leist paints her thoughts at a very small wages in a New York business house. Soon she will issue a book full of them." (from "My Painted Thoughts...")

=== Screenwriting ===
Roscoe worked as a scenario writer on a number of silent films.

==== Features ====
- Her Wayward Parents (1917)
- With Davy Crockett at the Fall of the Alamo (1926)
- Detective K-9 (1926)

=== Fiction ===
As Clover Leist, Roscoe published several short stories: "The Blue Ring" in the February 1908 issue of The Scrap Book magazine, "The Class Pin" in the May 1909 issue of the stage picture magazine People's, and "The Little Red Lark" for the August 1909 issue of People's.
