= Grace Duffie Boylan =

American writer

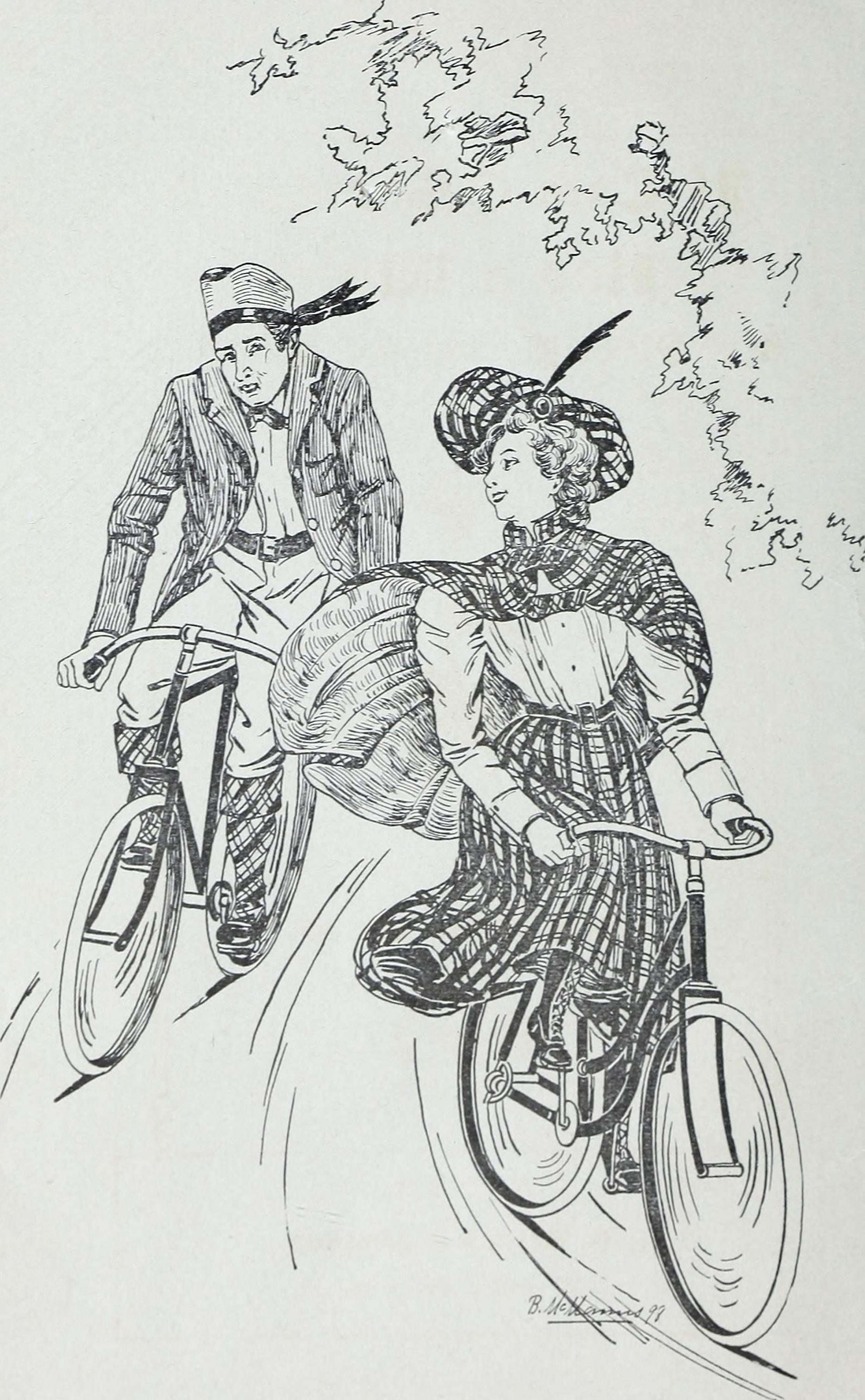
Drawing from If Tam O'Shanter'd had a wheel, and other poems and sketches (1898).

Grace Duffie Boylan (February 9, 1861 – March 24, 1935) was an American writer. She wrote many children's books, often dealing with diverse races and cultures, like Uncle Tom's Cabin (not to be confounded with the same title by Harriet Beecher Stowe). Other titles include: Young Folks, Our Little Eskimo Kiddies: Kids of Many Colors, Yama Yama Land, and Our Little Cuban Kiddies.

Her Thy Son Liveth: Messages From A Soldier To His Mother appeared in 1918 anonymously. It is her account (the following editions were published under her name) of what her son communicated to her about death using morse code and automatic writing after his death on the battlefield in France during World War I.

This novel served Director Peter O'Fallon as the base for his movie A Rumor of Angels (2001), starring Vanessa Redgrave. Transposed to our times, the plot is about a boy who learns to cope with the death of his mother by befriending a grumpy old lady.

Boylan was mother to American screenwriter and U.S. Coast Guard Auxiliary founder Malcolm Stuart Boylan and the writer and editor Clover Roscoe.

== Selected publications ==
- The Old House and Other Poems and Sketches (1897)
- Thy Son Liveth: Messages From a Soldier to His Mother (1918)
