= May Birkhead =

American fashion and society reporter (1882–1941)

May Rule Birkhead
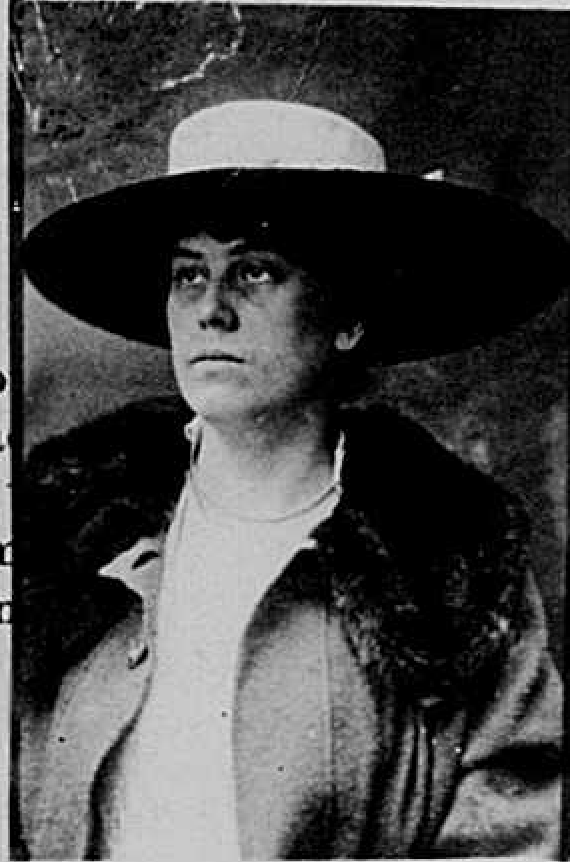
- Birkhead's 1916 passport photo
- Born: March 14, 1882; Louisiana, Missouri, U.S.
- Died: October 27, 1941 (aged 59)
- Resting place: Riverview Cemetery, Louisiana, Missouri
- Known for: Journalism

May Rule Birkhead (1882–1941) was an American fashion and society reporter who reported from Paris between 1913 and 1941. She wrote primarily for the Paris editions of the New York Herald and the Chicago Tribune, and also contributed to the New York Times and as a radio correspondent for NBC News.

Birkhead launched her career as a journalist when, as a passenger on the RMS Carpathia, the ship came to the sinking Titanic's rescue in 1912. She gathered accounts of Titanic passengers' experiences for the New York Herald, and was shortly thereafter offered a position at the Herald's Paris newspaper, commonly known as the Paris Herald. Birkhead's reporting on American society in Europe drew so much attention that she was at one point referred to as "the society empress of the American press in Europe".

== Biography ==
May Rule Birkhead was born in 1882 in Louisiana, Missouri, north of St. Louis. Her father was a dentist, and her mother came from a family with long Missouri roots. The family was close friends with that of James Beauchamp "Champ" Clark.

Birkhead was embarking on her first visit to Europe when she had her encounter with the Titanic, and after the Carpathia returned the Titanic's survivors to New York, she reembarked for Paris, arriving in 1912. She resided in Paris from 1912 until 1940, when she fled the Nazi-occupied city.

She died in New York in 1941, following "a long illness".

== Career ==
Birkhead's amateur reporting on the Titanic disaster so impressed James Gordon Bennett Jr - owner of the New York Herald and the Paris Herald - that when she arrived in Paris in 1912 he immediately offered her a job as society columnist for the paper. She reported on the activities of Americans not just in Paris, but in the French Riviera and other popular destinations for Anglophone residents and visitors across Europe.

When World War I began, Birkhead began covering the activities of General Pershing, her fellow Missourian, for the paper, as well as becoming one of the few female reporters to visit battlefields (albeit after the armistice). After the war she returned to reporting on fashion and society news.

In 1926, Birkhead left the Paris Herald to become a society columnist for the Herald's rival Paris American newspaper: the Paris Tribune. At the Tribune, Birkhead's column appeared on the front page of the paper six days a week, until the newspaper was bought by the Herald in 1934, becoming the International Herald Tribune. After this she wrote as a special correspondent for the New York Times, and a radio correspondent for NBC radio.

Birkhead retains a reputation as one of the most famous society columnists of all time—appearing as one of only five society columnists named in the Encyclopedia of American Journalism's list that spans two centuries.

== See also ==
- Bernice Palmer, fellow passenger aboard Carpathia
- Louis Ogden, fellow passenger aboard Carpathia
