= Society reporting =

Newspaper section

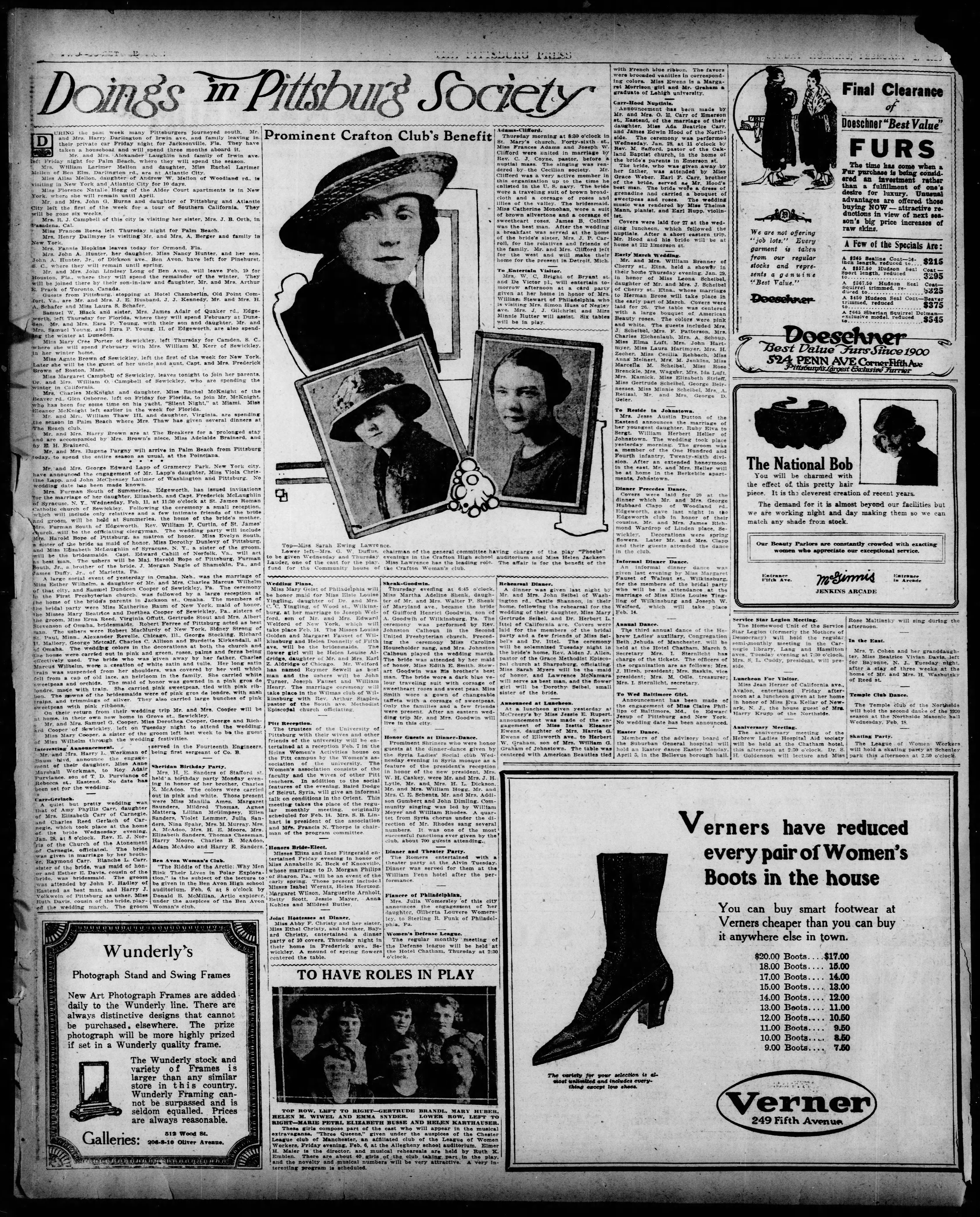
"Doings in Pittsburg Society," the society page of The Pittsburg Press, on February 1, 1920

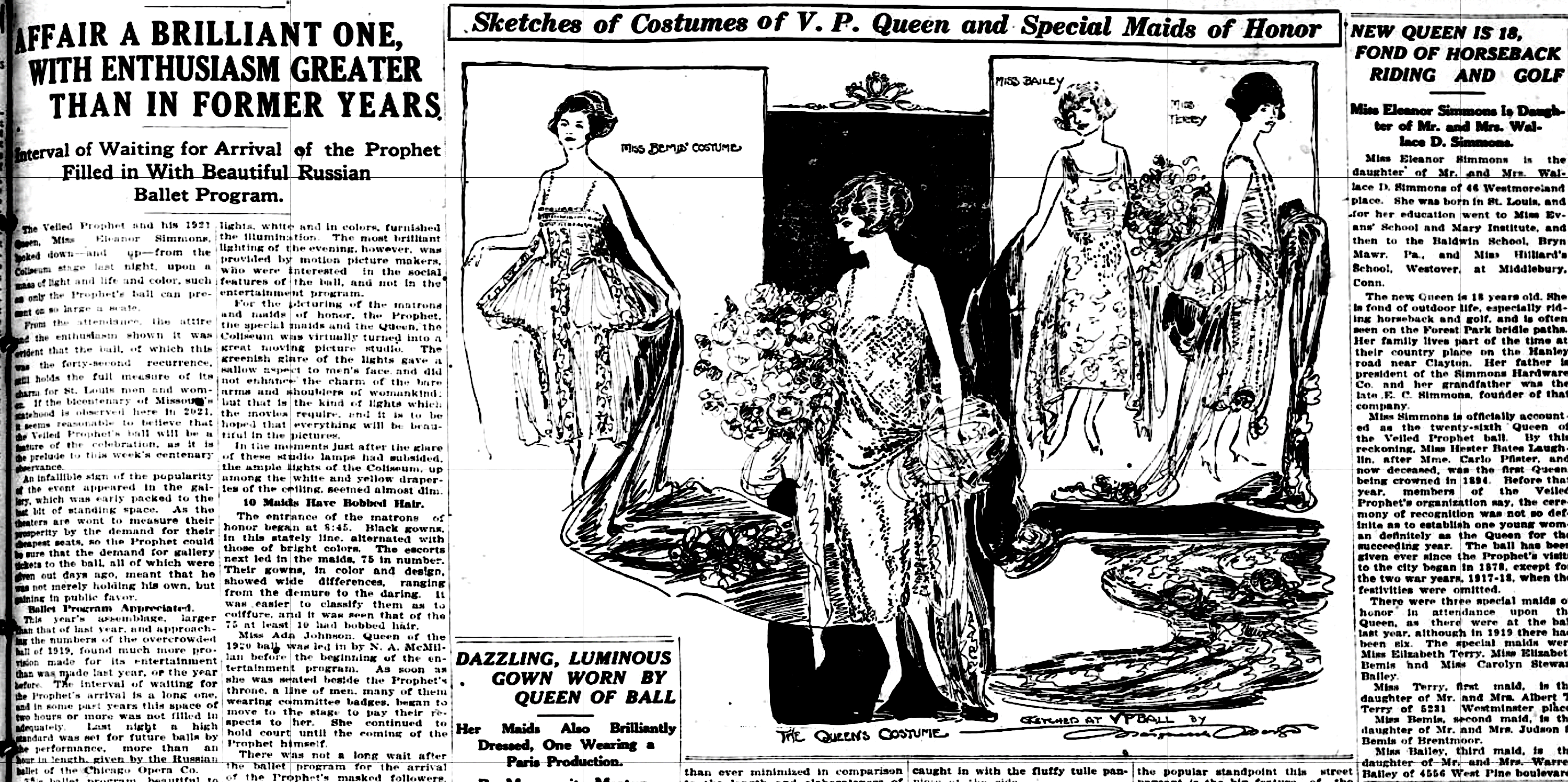
This 1921 clipping, with story and drawings by St. Louis Post-Dispatch reporter Marguerite Martyn, represents the saturation newspaper coverage given to fashionable society women at the Veiled Prophet Ball in that city.

In journalism, the society page of a newspaper is largely or entirely devoted to the social and cultural events and gossip of the location covered. Other features that frequently appear on the society page are a calendar of charity events and pictures of locally, nationally and internationally famous people. Society pages expanded to become women's page sections.

== History ==
The first true society page in the United States was the invention of newspaper owner James Gordon Bennett Sr., who created it for the New York Herald in 1840. His reportage centred upon the lives and social gatherings of the rich and famous, with names partially deleted by dashes and reports mildly satirical. Mott et al. record that "Society was at first aghast, then amused, then complacent, and finally hungry for the penny-press stories of its own doings." Bennett had in fact been reporting such news since 1827, with articles in the New York Enquirer. In the period after the United States Civil War, there were many newly rich people in the country, and reportage of their antics, sometimes tasteless and gauche, was of considerable entertainment value. By 1885, Ward McAllister had been recruited to report on society news for the New York World by Joseph Pulitzer, and it was around that time that society reporting, both on dedicated society pages and in the new Sunday supplements, became very popular.

Society pages and society reporting were prevalent in the New York daily newspapers from the winter of 1880 onward. The previous year, Pearl Rivers had transplanted the notion to New Orleans, where she had begun the Society Bee, a local society column, on March 16, 1879. Again, the initial reaction was shock. Rivers reported, in the Society Bee itself, of course, the reaction of one woman who was, "opposed to print on principle". Print applied to persons is her special horror and abomination ... poison only fit for politics, Associated Press dispatches, and police reports. She thought me very wrong to mention any ladies' names in a newspaper. She said [that] it was 'shabby' and 'shoddy' and 'shameful'." But Rivers persevered, and a decade later, on November 2, 1890, the column, now simply titled Society, was the largest part of the Sunday paper carrying it.

By 1900, most daily newspapers had a women's page that covered local high society as well as fashion. The goal in any case was to attract women as readers and attract subscribers by promising a new audience for consumer advertising. Women's pages in general covered issues intended to attract the readership of the stereotypical American housewife of the time: society news, fashion, food, relationships, etiquette, health, homemaking, interior decorating, and family issues. One of the most prominent leaders was Marjorie Paxson. She began her career in a wire service during World War I when male reporters were scarce. When they returned she went to the women's page in Houston, Texas. In the 1950s she moved to the women's section of the Miami Herald, Which was nationally renowned for its women's page. She became women's page editor at the St. Petersburg Times in 1969. She was elected national president of Theta Sigma Phi, now Association for Women in Communications, in 1963. She went on to become the fourth female publisher in the Gannett newspaper chain. After 1970, however, gender segregation faded and the term "woman's page" fell out of fashion. Women in journalism then moved from covering teas and bridal veils to abortion, abuse and feminism.

In Britain, society news was at the same time emerging in the British press as part of "women's journalism", again aimed at attracting a female readership. It was also, in both the U.S. and Britain, largely the province of women journalists, and considered subordinate.

For example, Society news, in the late 19th century, was not sent to the newspapers by reporters via the telegraph, as other news was because that was considered too expensive for mere society reporting. Society journalists instead sent their reports by ordinary mail. Dix Harwood, author of the 1927 journalism textbook Getting and Writing News, stated that society reporting rarely enjoyed much dignity.

Despite the growth in popularity in the 1880s, many "serious" newspapers were initially cautious about society reporting. For example, the Ottawa Journal didn't permit Florence Randal, its first society reporter, to do anything but recite simple chronicles of the dowagers and debutantes of the city. The staff at the Globe, whose society column began in 1893, considered society news to be "horrid vulgar stuff", according to the Globe's editor Melville Hammond and its publication was not well received by its subjects: "High Society matrons [who were] unused to the publicizing of private life".

Mrs. Willoughby Cummings (née Emily Ann McCausland Shortt), worked as a press journalist and the first society editor of the Toronto Globe under the pen name of "Sama". Under her stewardship, the Toronto Globe expanded its society coverage from weekly notes to a daily column in three years. In 1900, she became editor of "Woman's Sphere", a department of the Canadian Magazine. She worked on behalf of the poor and afflicted and served as an official of various societies. In 1902, for example, she became the corresponding secretary for the National Council of Women of Canada.

In the 19th and early 20th centuries, society reporting was seen as largely the province of female journalists. The "women's pages" were written by women. Indeed, in the 19th century in many newspapers, particularly smaller ones, the only women on the paper's staff at all were those who covered society news. Dix Harwood claimed that the society desk, and the woman who ran it, was nonetheless important:

Too often this department has [a] little dignity, but it may be made into a highly respectable source for covering local happenings; and the society desk is oftentimes one of the most valuable offices on the paper if the occupant [should] be a woman of high intelligence with a nose for news ... and a woman of poise and dignity—a women [sic] whom hostesses will be forced to treat as equal.

— Dix Harwood, Getting and Writing News, 1927, pp. 148–149

Typical topics were "Miss Emily Bissell as a Turkish Girl", Chicago Tribune, Jan 1, 1900 or "Maryland Society Belle Was Fair Senorita at Ball", Times-Picayune, Feb 7, 1916.

Male reporters were unwilling to cover such things. As Morton Sontheimer stated in 1941, "The women's department jobs almost invariably go to women, not because men can't do them but because they won't." (Newspaperman, pp. 228). One such reporter who refused to do the job even though it had been handed to him was Gordon Sinclair, of the Toronto Star.

Sinclair got the job of woman's page editor after Clifford Wallace, its previous editor, had begged to be relieved of the job. Wallace, the first male woman's page editor of the Star and nicknamed "Nellie" because of that, had been given the job as the result of the proprietor's wife, Mrs Atkinson, regarding the women who had previously run the women's desk as "a menace". In 1922, the managing editor reassigned the position from Wallace to Sinclair. Sinclair treated the position with utter contempt. He later wrote:

From the beginning I never took the job seriously, expecting [that] I would either be fired or soon moved to other work. As a consequence I used to come in at eight in the morning and, except on Saturdays, quit for the day about eleven. I shamelessly clipped most of my material from other newspapers, and stuck to the job for about fourteen months until young Joe Atkinson, who was at that time a proof reader, noticed that all my stuff had previously been published in some other paper.

— Gordon Sinclair

In 1936, journalist Ishbel Ross declared that "No society writer is more widely known on both sides of the Atlantic than May Birkhead." Birkhead wrote society columns for the Paris editions of the New York Herald and the Chicago Tribune (which merged into the International Herald Tribune) throughout the 1920s and 1930s.

== See also ==
- High society (social class)
- Socialite
- Women in journalism
