= Malcolm Stuart Boylan =

American screenwriter

Commodore/Lieutenant Commander Malcolm Stuart Boylan
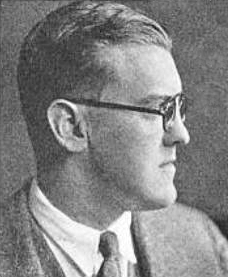
- Born: April 13, 1897; Chicago, Illinois, US
- Died: April 3, 1967 (aged 69); Hollywood, California, US
- Education: Private Tutors, Bermuda Education System
- Occupations: Writer, Coast Guard auxiliarist
- Spouses: Josephine Fountaine; Ladessa Gibson
- Children: Grace Boylan; Mary Boylan
- Relatives: Robert J. Boylan (father); Grace Duffie Boylan (mother)
- Writing career
- Language: English

Malcolm Stuart Boylan (April 13, 1897 – April 3, 1967) was an American screenwriter, writer, and founder of the U.S. Coast Guard Auxiliary.

== Screenwriting ==
Boylan entered the entertainment industry as a stage actor while working as a newspaper reporter and publicist at the Los Angeles Express Tribune. He became acquainted with the business of film in the early 1920s when he took the position of director of publicity for Universal and First National. He began supervising a weekly newsreel for Universal. In the early 1920s, he wrote the story line for three short films. Boylan became editorial supervisor for Fox Pictures and, in 1925, he began to create silent-film screen titles for fun. He made a name for himself by writing titles for the 1926 silent version of What Price Glory. The quality of his work was so good that he was soon listed in credits as "Title Designer" in The Great K&A Train Robbery with Tom Mix. With the advent of talkies, Boylan entered the realm of screenwriting in which he, primarily, worked as a script doctor. Though some of Boylan's screenplays were produced, he mainly contributed dialogue to scripts needing polish. His work creating additional dialogue started at Fox Pictures. Boylan later used his wordsmith skills at Columbia as well as at other studios such as Disney. Though much of his work was unbilled, Boylan contributed to/wrote more than 90 screenplays and teleplays between 1921 and 1963.

== Author ==
Boylan wrote three novels between 1950 and 1961:

- Tin Sword (1950), Little Brown Publishing, ASIN: B001IP8SXC
- Gold Pencil (1953), Boston Little Publishing, ASIN: B001NY1W72
- The Passion of Gabrielle, (1961), Crown Publishers, ASIN: B001MQNIEG

In addition, he contributed three short stories to the Saturday Evening Post in the late 1950s:

- The Chivalrous Challenger, October 19, 1957
- Crisis on Blue Beach, June 27, 1959
- Whistle-Buoy Brady, October 4, 1958

== Yachting and Coast Guard ==
Having been surrounded by Lake Michigan while growing up in Chicago, as well as by the Atlantic Ocean while he was educated in Bermuda, Boylan was interested in sea-going and its vessels. The 1932 Olympic Games in Los Angeles sparked enthusiasm for small boat racing in the area. Actors and athletes founded their own Yacht Clubs. In 1933, writers in the Los Angeles area banded together to form their own yacht club with membership exclusive to writers. Boylan was the original Vice-Commodore of this organization which was named the Pacific Writer's Yacht Club. In 1934, after having been elected Commodore of the Yacht Club, Boylan invited Lt. Francis C. Pollard (commander of the US Coast Guard Cutter Aurora stationed in the Los Angeles Harbor) to join him on a voyage being conducted by the Yacht Club after Pollard donated his time to inspect the seaworthiness of club vessels. During the trip from Los Angeles to Catalina Island, discussions between the two men resulted in the formation of the United States Coast Guard Reserve and the U.S. Coast Guard Auxiliary. After the U.S. Coast Guard Auxiliary and Reserves were founded by an act of Congress on June 23, 1939, Boylan rose to the office of Commodore in the Auxiliary (11th District); in addition, he retired with the rank of Lt. Commander in the Reserves.

== Personal ==
Boylan was the son of American writer Grace Duffie Boylan and newspaper reporter/horse racing expert, Robert J. Boylan. He was educated via a tutor as well as in the education system in Bermuda. His older, half-sister, Clover Roe Roscoe, was also a screen titlist in the movie industry. Boylan was married twice. He wed Josephine Fountaine (sometimes spelled "Fontaine") when he was 21 years old. Josephine, the daughter of Colbert Fountaine, came from a large Quebecois-American family with many siblings including Frances Fountaine Frakes and Colbert D. Fountaine, a World War II bombardier Josephine and Malcolm had two children, Grace and Mary Boylan. Boylan's grandson, Hon. Anthony Boylan Drewry, served as a Los Angeles County Court Commissioner for many years. Boylan was married a second time when he wed Ladessa Gibson Boylan in 1947. Malcolm Stuart Boylan was born in Chicago, Illinois, lived in Los Angeles, California, during his writing career, and died in Hollywood, California.

== Selected filmography ==
- The Magnificent Brute (1921)
- The Fate of a Flirt (1925)
- Wild Papa (1925)
- What Price Glory? (1926)
- 3 Bad Men (1926)
- The Blue Eagle (1926)
- Hands Across the Border (1926)
- The Great K&A Train Robbery (1926)
- The Joy Girl (1927)
- Pajamas (1927)
- The Wizard (1927)
- Sharp Shooters (1928)
- News Parade (1928)
- Woman Wise (1928)
- Road House (1928)
- Hangman's House (1928)
- Strong Boy (1929)
- Fugitives (1929)
- Trent's Last Case (1929)
- Shipmates (1931)
- Madame Racketeer (1932)
- O'Shaughnessy's Boy (1935)
- A Yank at Oxford (1938)
- The Lady's from Kentucky (1938)
- The Devil Pays Off (1941)
- Mercy Island (1941)
- Red River Valley (1941)
- Sailors on Leave (1941)
- Remember Pearl Harbor (1942)
- Alaska (1944)
- The Man Who Dared (1946)
- Alias Mr. Twilight (1946)
- For the Love of Rusty (1947)
- The Son of Rusty (1947)
- Keeper of the Bees (1947)
- Customs Agent (1950)
- Soldiers Three (1951)
- Magic Fountain (1963)
