= A Rumor of Angels =

2002 American film directed by Peter O'Fallon

- Directed by: Peter O'Fallon
- Written by: Peter O'Fallon; James Eric; Jamie Horton
- Produced by: Lisa M. Hansen; Paul Hertzberg; Peter O'Fallon; John Hamilton; Brad Krevoy
- Starring: Vanessa Redgrave; Ray Liotta; Trevor Morgan
- Cinematography: Roy H. Wagner
- Edited by: Louise Rubacky
- Music by: Tim Simonec
- Production companies: CineTel Films; MPCA; Rumor Productions; Rumor of Angels Inc.
- Distributed by: Metro-Goldwyn-Mayer
- Release date: February 1, 2002 (U.S.)
- Running time: 105 minutes
- Country: United States
- Language: English

A Rumor of Angels is a 2002 American film directed by Peter O'Fallon, starring Vanessa Redgrave, Trevor Morgan and Ray Liotta. The story is based upon the 1918 novel Thy Son Liveth: Messages From a Soldier to His Mother by Grace Duffie Boylan. Although the novel tells the story of what a mother learned from her son about death after he dies in a French battlefield during World War I, the movie is set in the latter part of the 20th century.

== Plot ==
A twelve-year-old boy James (Trevor Morgan) lives with his father Nathan (Ray Liotta) and stepmother Mary (Catherine McCormack). He lost his mother in a car accident two years earlier. The memories of the accident still haunt him and make him freeze with panic. He has not been able to talk about his feelings about the accident and the death of his mother because his father is always away from home and he does not want to talk to his stepmother.

One day playing an imaginary game behind the house of Maddy Bennet (Vanessa Redgrave), he breaks her fence. Maddy demands that he fix it. Soon the two become good friends. Maddy also lost her son Bobby in 1974 in the Vietnam War. She tells her experiences of losing her son to James. She forces James to talk about his mother and face his fears. She tells him that her son Bobby talks to her.

James's parents do not like the stories Maddy tells James and forbid him from seeing her. James becomes distraught at the "loss" of his friend. Meanwhile, Maddy has a heart attack, and James's parents permit him to nurse her back to health. Soon after her recovery, though, she dies. James becomes reconciled with his father, who now talks to him more, and with his stepmother.

== Cast ==
- Maddy Bennett - Vanessa Redgrave
- Nathan Neubauer - Ray Liotta
- Mary Neubauer - Catherine McCormack
- James Neubauer - Trevor Morgan
- Lillian Neubauer - Michelle Grace
- Uncle Charlie - Ron Livingston
- Dr Sam Jenkins - George Coe

== Production ==
Set on the Maine coast, the movie was filmed in mid-1999 in Nova Scotia, Canada, at Lunenburg and Crystal Crescent Beach. It debuted in September 2000 at the Toronto International Film Festival, but was not released in the U.S. until 2002.
