= Kodak Brownie =

Series of photo cameras

Brownie
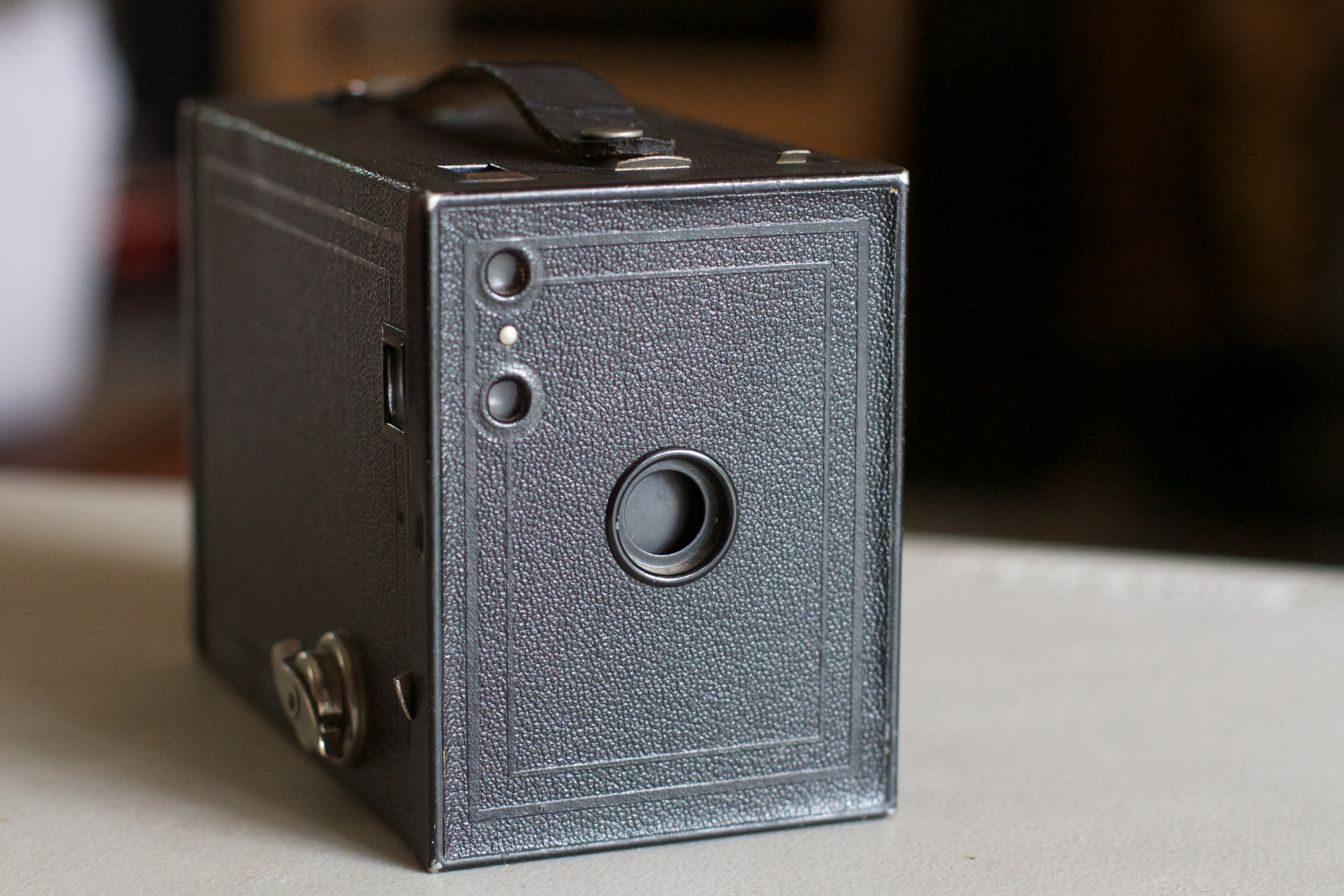
- Kodak Brownie No.2 Model F (1924)

Overview
- Maker: Eastman Kodak
- Type: box camera
- Released: February 1900
- Production: 1900–1986
- Intro price: $1 (equivalent to $39 in 2025)

Lens
- Lens: Meniscus Achromat lens

Sensor/medium
- Film format: Eastman No. 117 rollfilm
- Film size: 2 1/4-inch square

Shutter
- Shutter: Rotary, 1/40 second

General
- Body features: Leatherette covered cardboard
- Made in: Rochester, New York

Chronology
- Successor: No. 2 Brownie (1901)

References
- Brownie (original model)

The Brownie was a series of camera models made by Eastman Kodak and first released in 1900.

It introduced the snapshot to the masses by addressing the cost factor that had kept amateur photography beyond many people's means; the Pocket Kodak, for example, cost most families in Britain nearly a whole month's wages.

The Brownie was a basic cardboard box camera with a simple convex-concave lens that took 2 1/4-inch square pictures on No. 117 roll film. It was conceived and marketed for the sale of Kodak roll films. Because of its simple controls and initial price of US$1 (equivalent to $39 in 2025) and the low price of Kodak roll film and processing, the Brownie surpassed its marketing goal.

== Invention and etymology ==
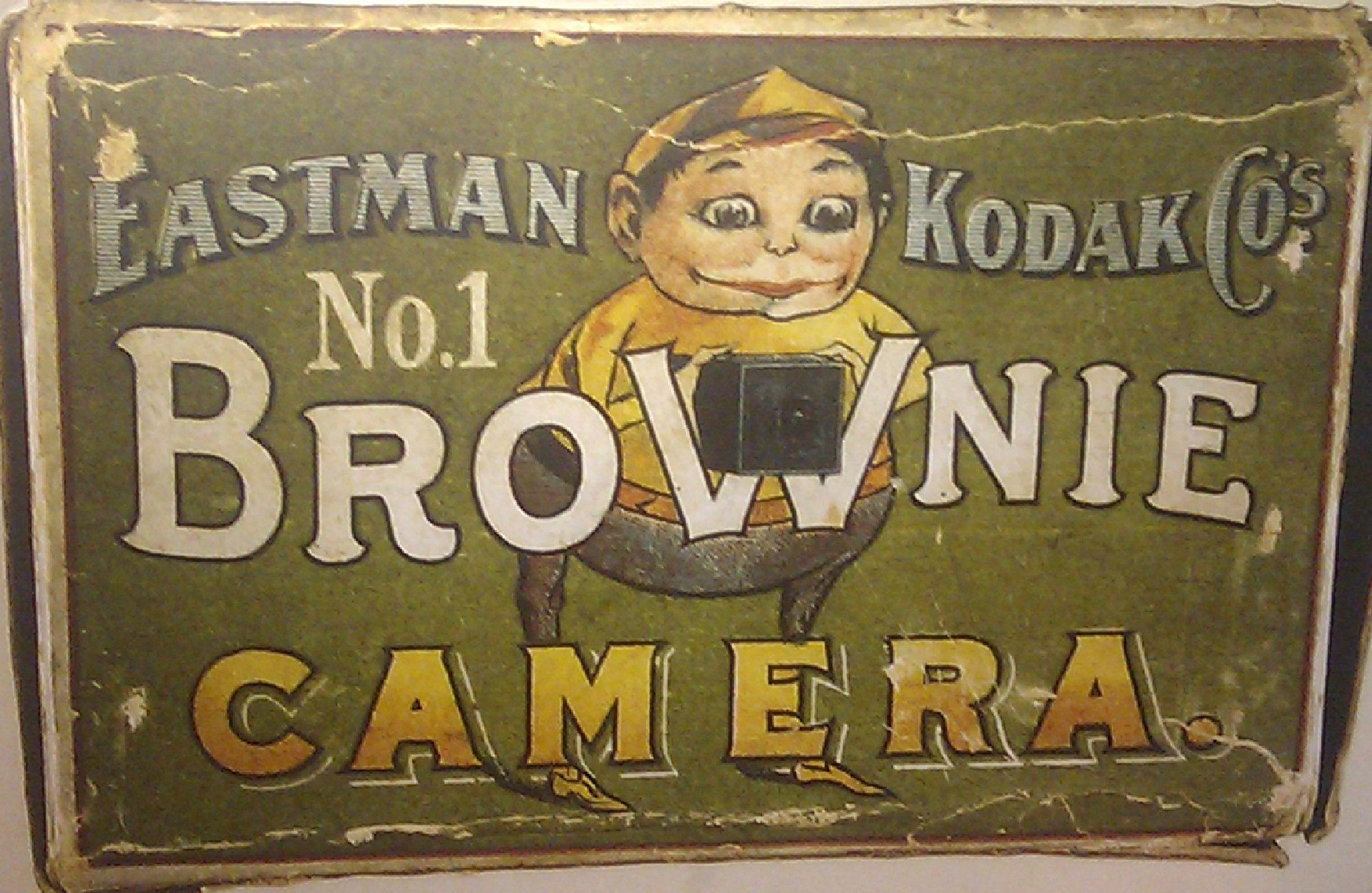
Kodak Brownie advertisement

Frank A. Brownell invented the Brownie for the Eastman Kodak Company. Named after The Brownies, characters popularised by the Canadian writer Palmer Cox, the camera was initially aimed at children. More than 150,000 Brownie cameras were shipped in the first year of production, and cost a mere 5 shillings in the United Kingdom. An improved model, No. 2 Brownie, came in 1901, which produced larger 3.25-by-2.25-inch (1.44:1 aspect ratio) photos, cost $2, and was also a huge success.

The Brownie gained broader appeal as people realized that, although very simple in design and operation, it could produce very good results under the right conditions.

As they were ubiquitous, many iconic shots were taken on Brownies; on 15 April 1912, Bernice Palmer used a Kodak Brownie 2A, Model A to photograph the Titanic survivors on deck of the RMS Carpathia, on which Palmer was travelling. Soldiers took Brownies to war, but by World War I the more compact Vest Pocket Kodak Camera and Kodak's Autographic Camera were the most frequently used.

Known for its large photo archive is Czar Nicholas II of Russia's family, especially his four daughters (known as the OTMA sisters). They too made Brownie models of them to produce panoramic 4:1 photos (see Gallery).

Having written an article in the 1940s for amateur photographers suggesting an expensive camera was unnecessary for quality photography, Picture Post photographer Bert Hardy used a Brownie camera to stage a carefully posed snapshot of 17-year-old Pat Stewart, a Tiller Girls dancer, with her friend, Wendy Clarke, sitting on railings of North Pier, Blackpool, for the cover of Picture Post.

== Varieties ==
The Kodak Brownie Number 2 is a box camera manufactured by the Eastman Kodak Company from 1901 to 1935. There were five models, A through F, and it was the first camera to use 120 film. It also came with a viewfinder and a handle. The Brownie Number 2 was made of a choice of three materials: cardboard, costing US$2, aluminum, costing US$2.75, and a color model, which cost US$2.50. It was a very popular and affordable camera, and many are still in use by film photographers.

The cameras remained popular and spawned a wide variety, including a Boy Scout edition in the 1930s. In 1940, Kodak released the Six-20 Flash Brownie, Kodak's first internally synchronized flash camera, using General Electric bulbs. In 1957, Kodak produced the Brownie Starflash, Kodak's first camera with a built-in flash.

The Brownie 127 was popular, selling in the millions between 1952 and 1967. It was a bakelite camera with a simple meniscus lens and a curved film plane to compensate for the lens's deficiencies. Another model was the Brownie Cresta, sold between 1955 and 1958. It used 120 film and had a fixed-focus lens.

The last Brownie camera made was the Brownie II, a 110 cartridge film model produced in Brazil for one year, 1986.

== Gallery ==
=== The camera models ===
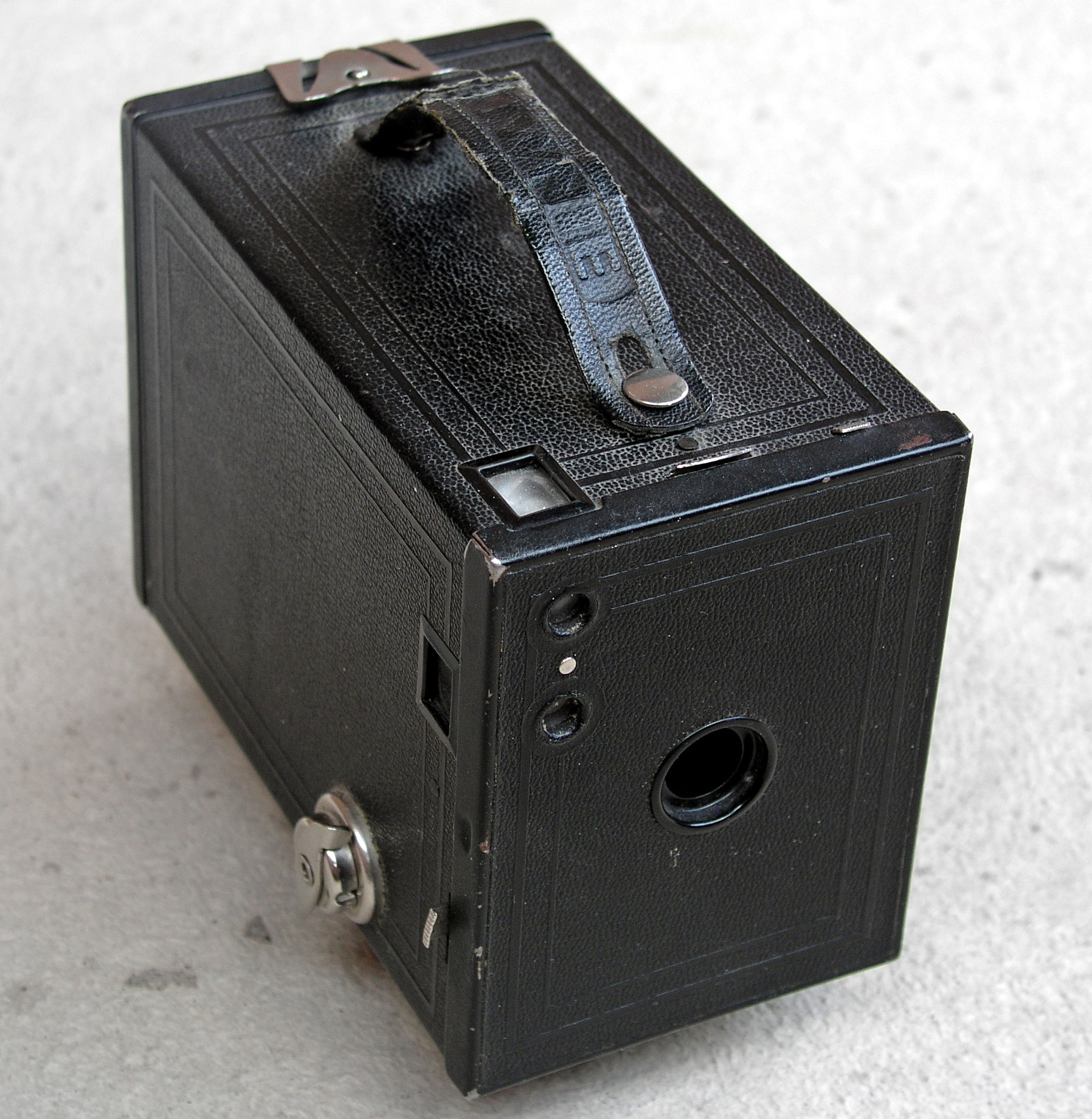
Brownie No. 2 (1901–1935)

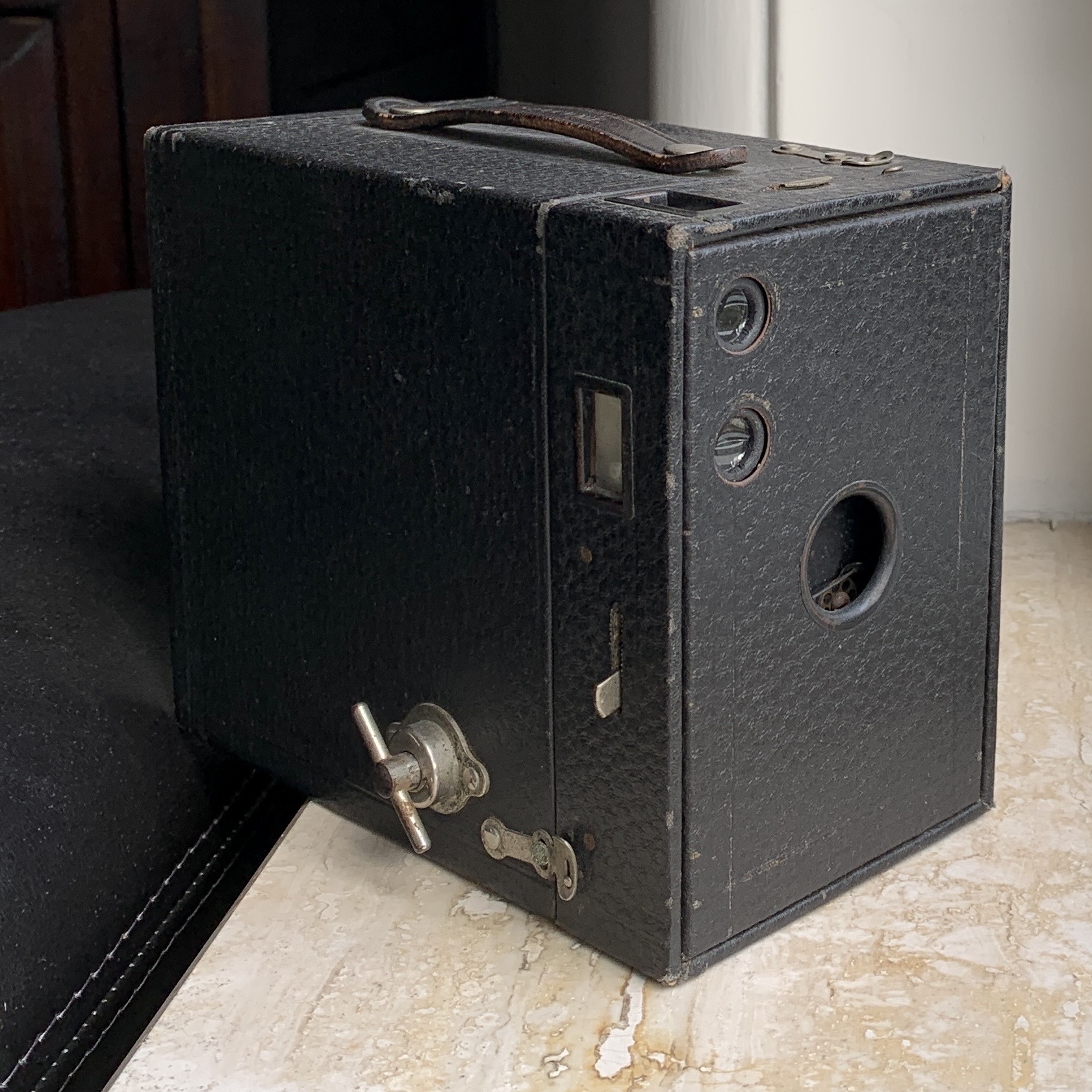
Kodak Brownie No. 2A, Model A (1909-1911), used by Bernice Palmer aboard RMS Carpathia

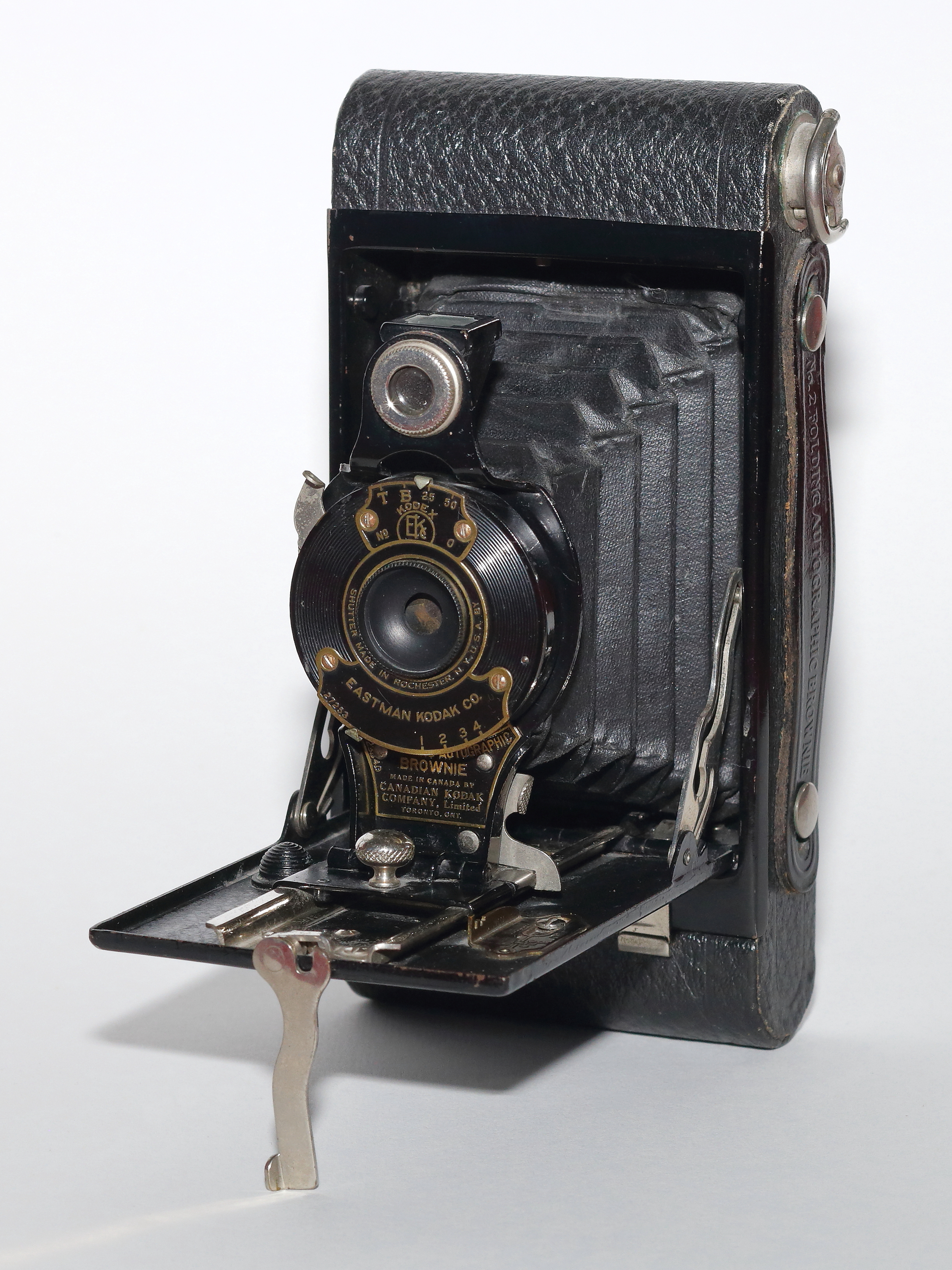
No. 2 Folding Autographic Brownie (1915–1926)

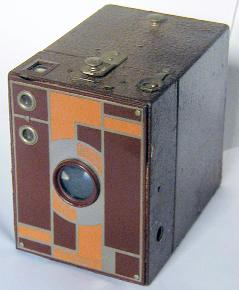
Beau Brownie camera (1930–1933)

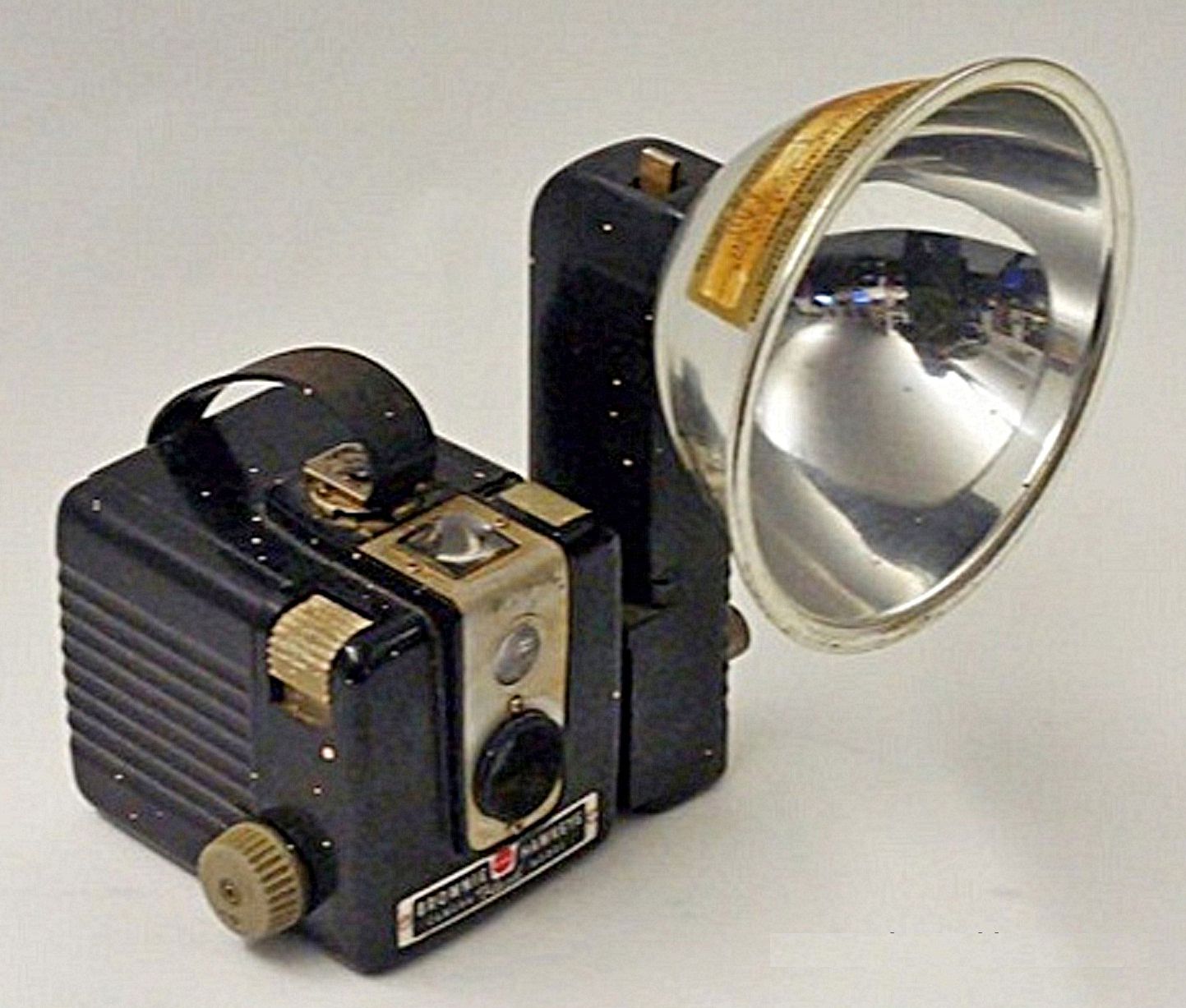
Hawkeye Brownie Flash Model (1950–1961)

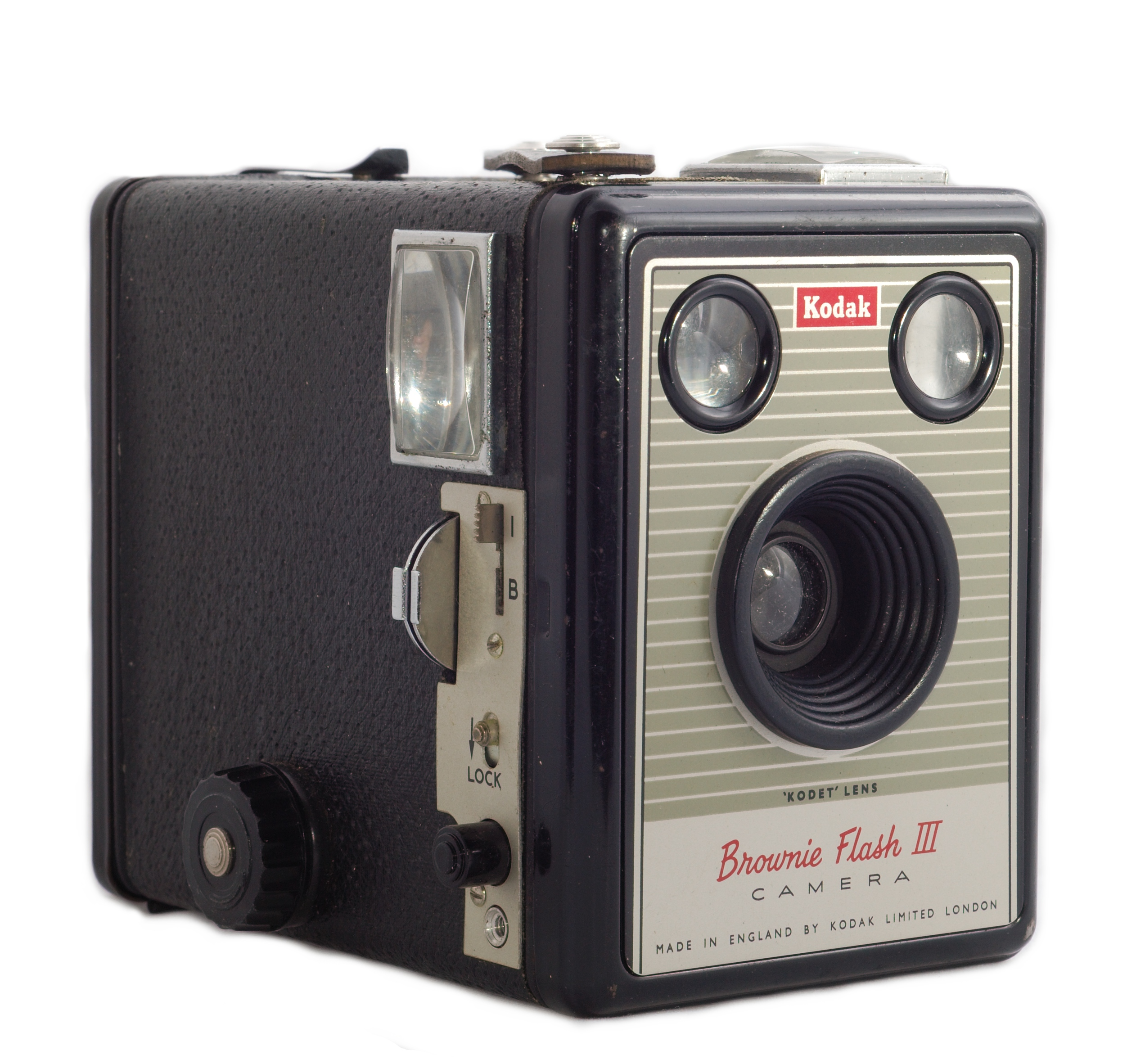
Brownie Flash III (1957–1960)

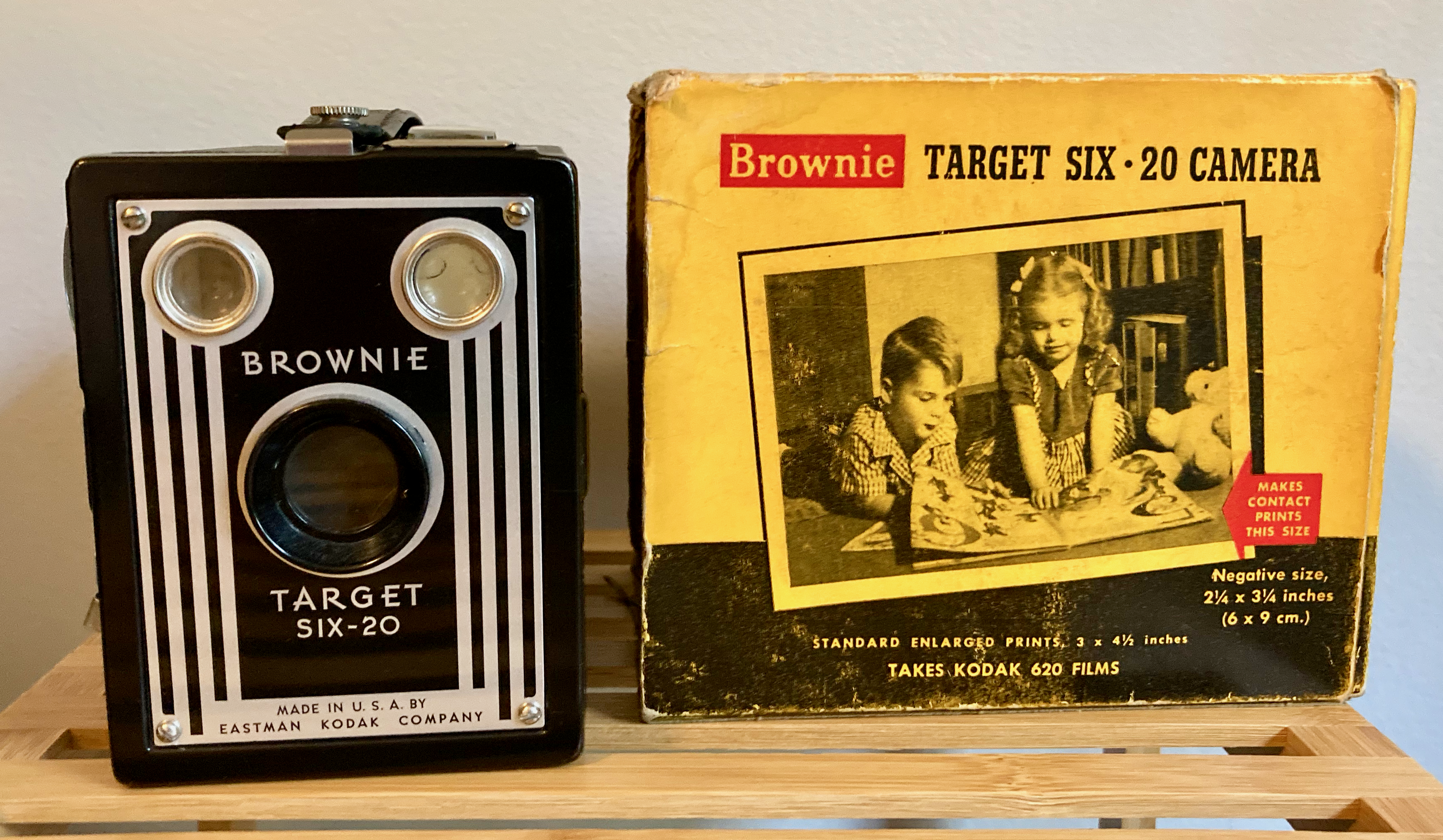
A Kodak Brownie Target Six-20 camera with its original box

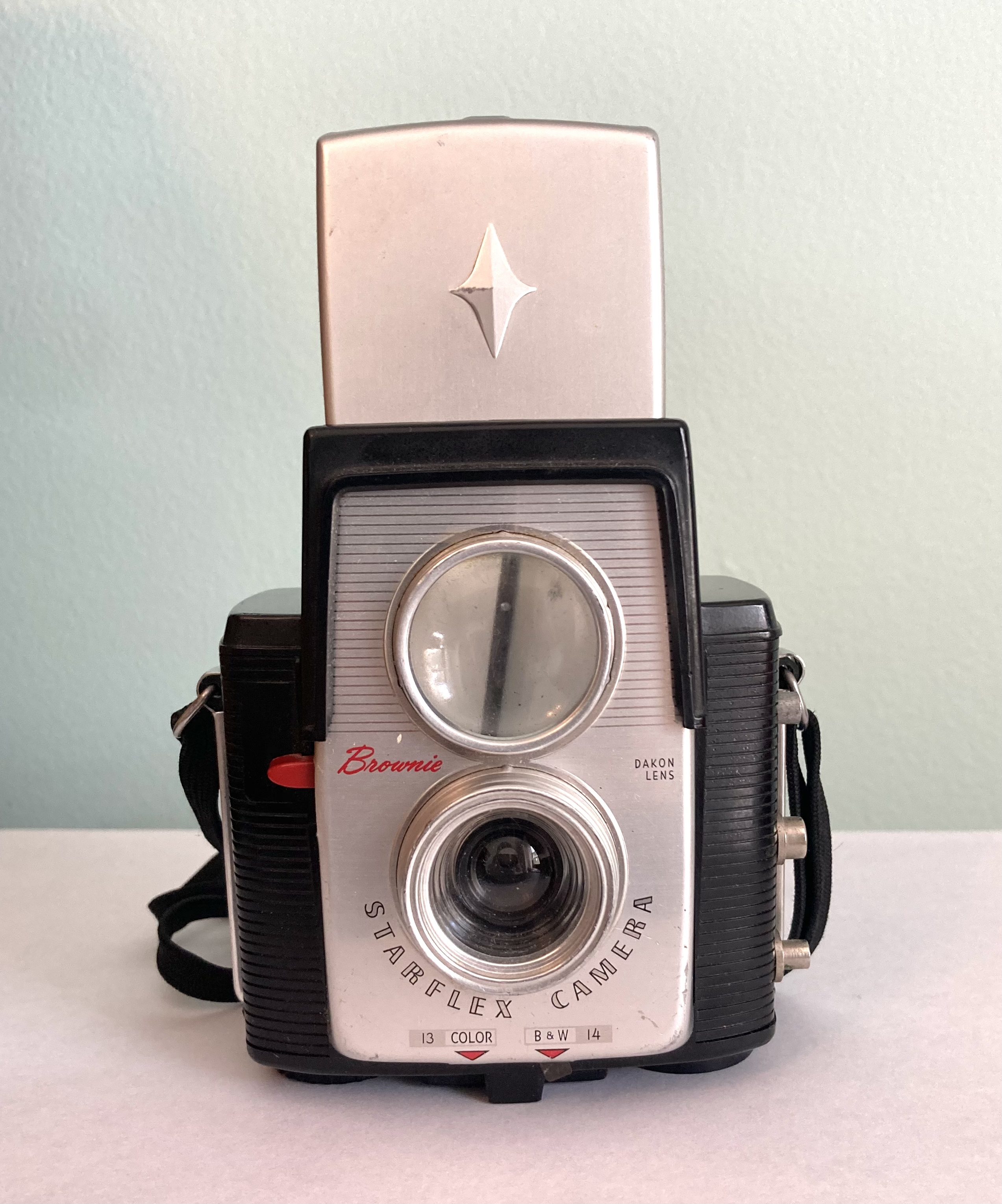
A Brownie Starflex camera with the cover for its finder window popped up.

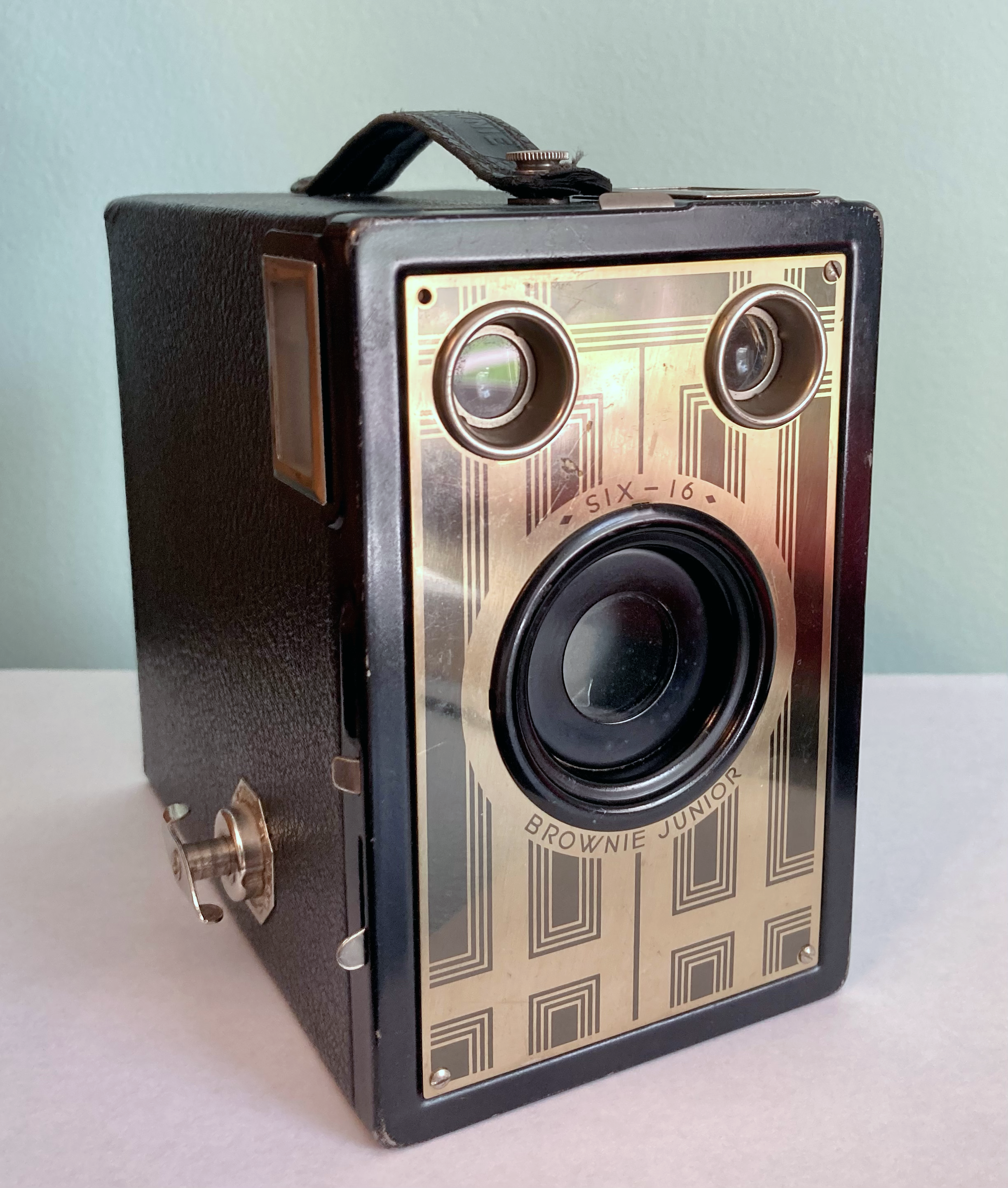
A Kodak Six-16 Brownie Junior box camera

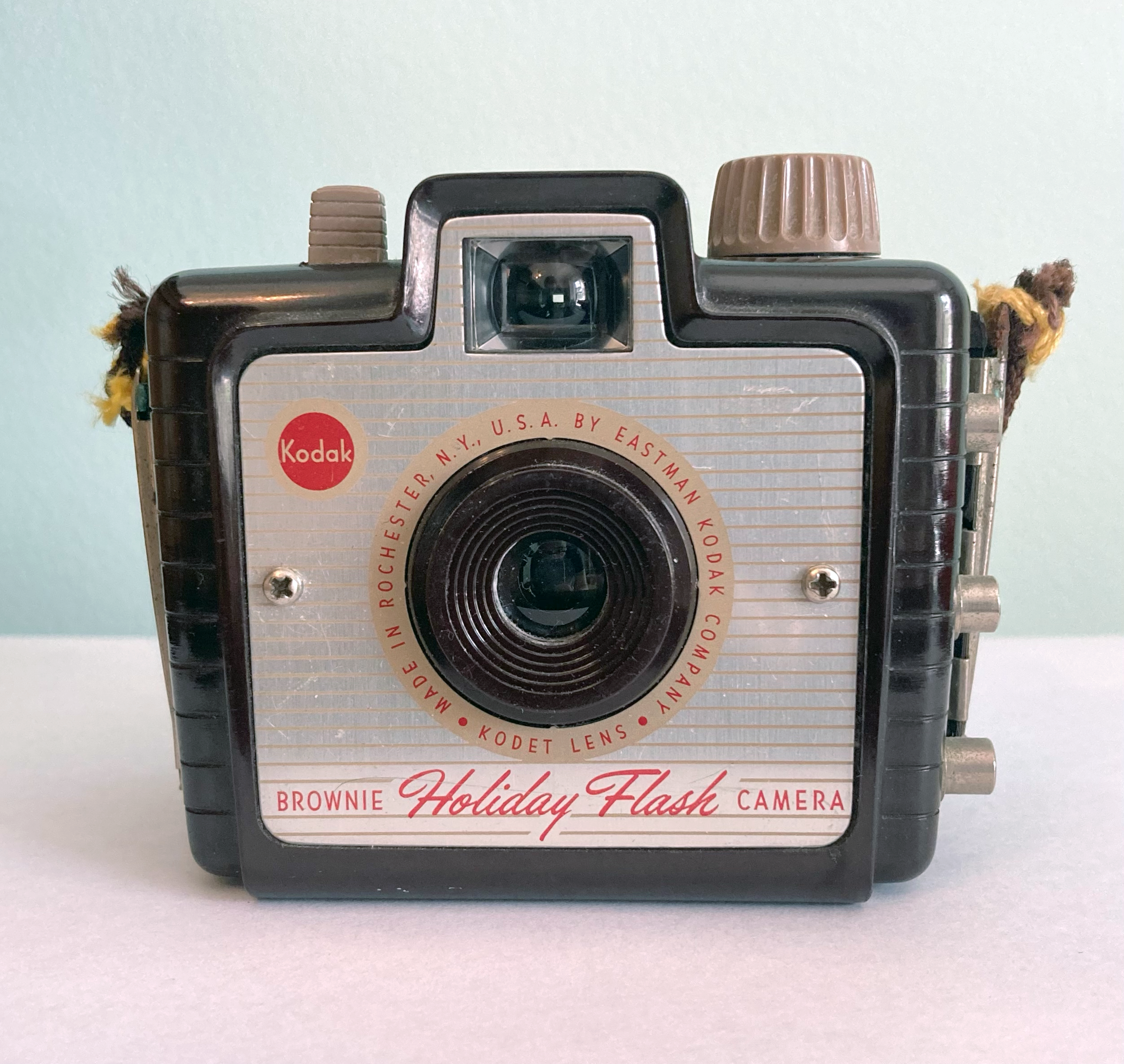
A Kodak Brownie Holiday Flash box camera

=== Portrait photos ===
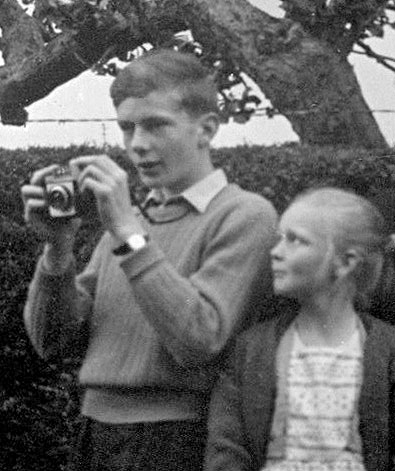
Young photographer using a Brownie 127

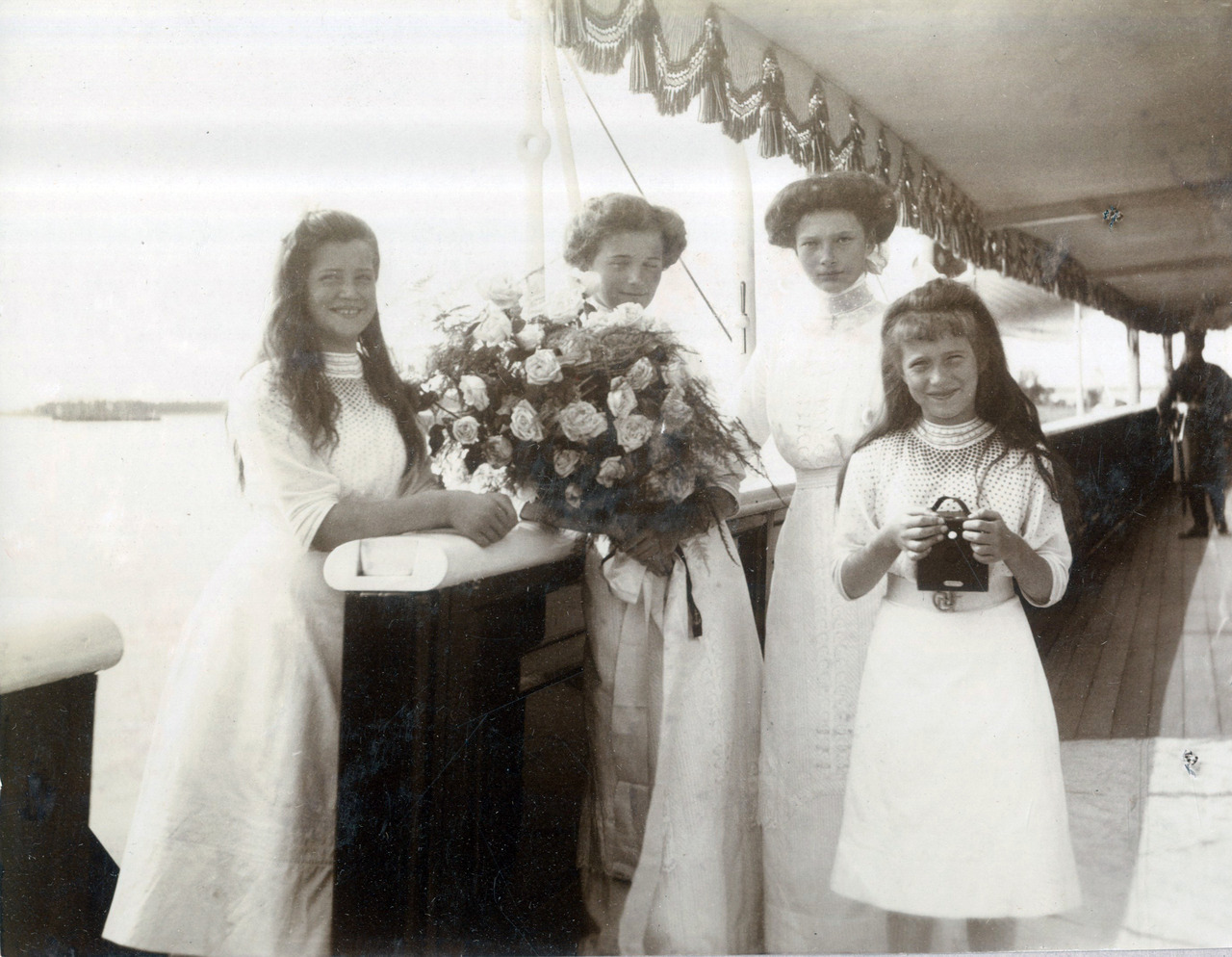
A photo shot by the OTMA sisters on 12 July 1912. Notice the Brownie no. 2 in the grand duchess Anastasia's hands.

=== Panoramic photos ===
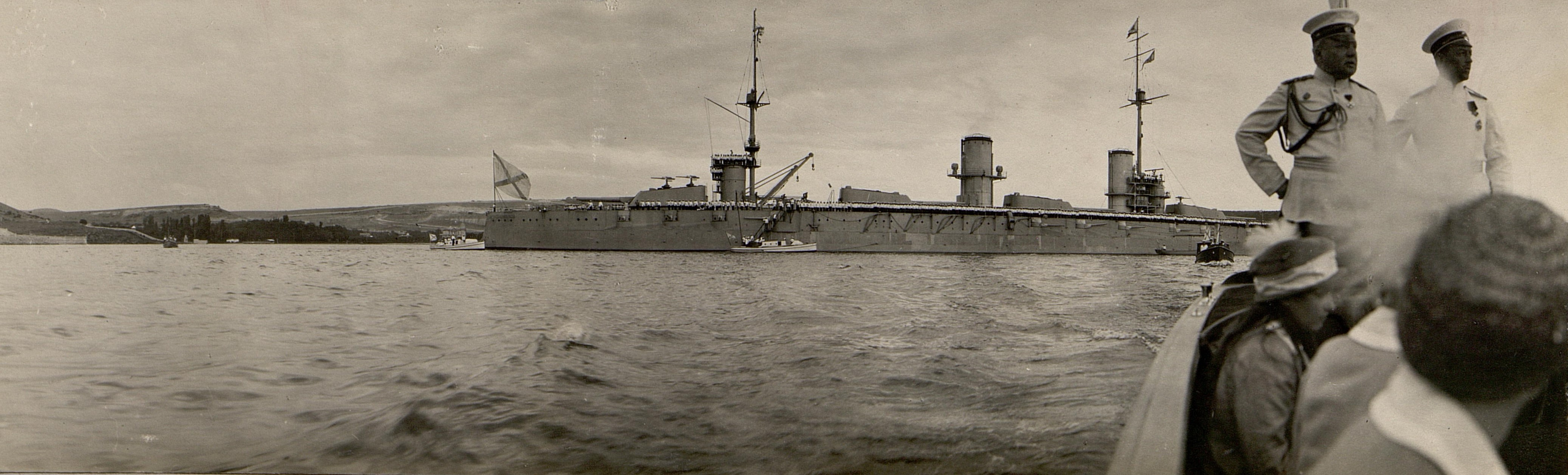
A panoramic photo shot with a Brownie no. 2 (perhaps with a wide-angle lens) by the Romanov family in the port of Sevastopol, inspecting the Russian battleship Imperatritsa Mariya (27 May 1916). The grand duchess Anastasia is clearly visible on the right.

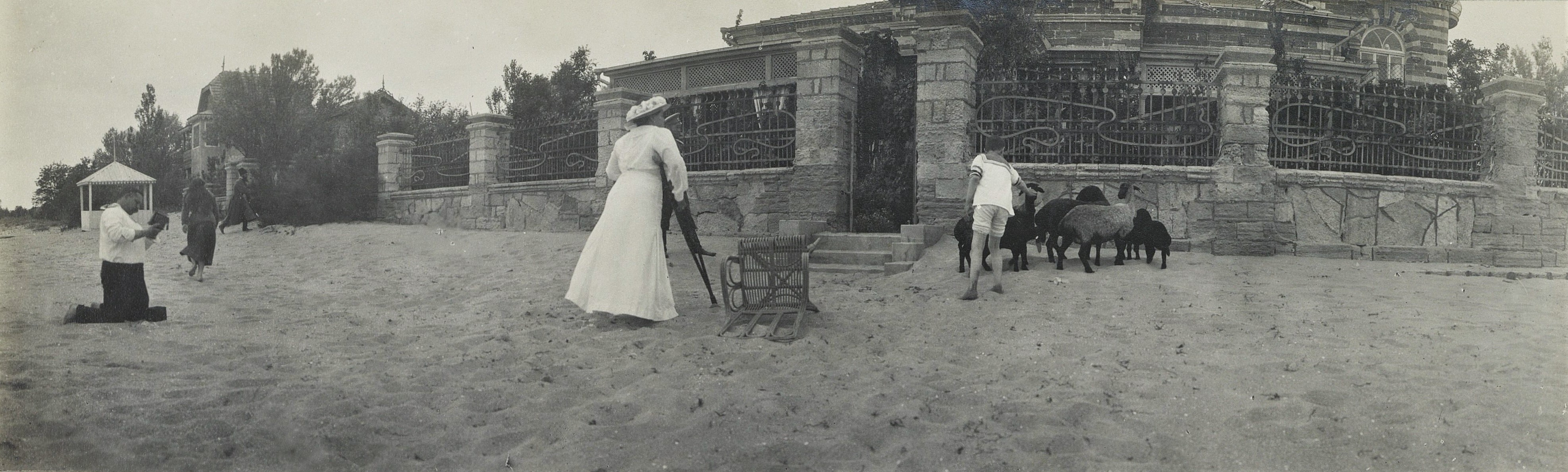
Another panoramic photo—a close-up one-shot with a Brownie no. 2 by the Romanov family in Crimea, at the summer residence of countess Anna Vyrubova in Yevpatoria (29 May 1916).

== See also ==
- The Diana camera was a low-cost "toy" camera introduced in the 1960s.
- Holga cameras were manufactured from 1982 to 2015 and 2017-present.
