= Henry S. Harper =

American businessman (1864–1944)

- Born: Henry Sleeper Harper; March 11, 1864; New York City, US
- Died: March 1, 1944 (aged 79)
- Education: Columbia University (BA)
- Occupation: Publisher
- Employer(s): Director, Harper & Brothers
- Known for: Titanic survivor, forest conservation
- Board member of: The Association for the Protection of the Adirondacks
- Spouse(s): Myra Raymond (Haxtun) Harper, m. 28 Feb 1889; Anne Waterman (Hopson) Harper
- Children: 1

Henry Sleeper Harper (11 March 1864 – 1 March 1944) was an American businessman. He was an incorporator of Harper & Brothers when the firm became a corporation in 1896. Harper is remembered as a passenger on the RMS Titanic when it sank on April 15, 1912, particularly because his Pekingese Sun Yat-sen was one of three dogs to survive the sinking of the Titanic, and also for his work to save the Adirondack forests from logging.

== Early life and education ==
The son of Joseph Wesley Harper Jr. and Abigail Payson Sleeper, Henry graduated from Columbia University in 1888.

== Career ==
Henry was a director of the Harper & Brothers Publishing House. Henry's grandfather, Joseph Wesley Harper, had founded the firm Harper & Brothers, which gave way in 1900 to the publishing house.

== Personal life ==
He was married to Myra Raymond Haxtun on February 28, 1889. They would have one child early in their marriage, who died in infancy. In 1911, he purchased a home at 133 E. 21st St., overlooking Gramercy Park from the north. After Myra's death on November 27, 1923, he was remarried to Anne Waterman Hopson, a niece of his first wife, and they had a son, Henry Sleeper Harper Jr. In 1926 he moved to 38th and Lexington Avenue into a mansion that exists today.

Harper was a guest at Mark Twain's 67th birthday, held November 28, 1902, at the Metropolitan Club in New York.

He was a member of the University Club of New York and the Century Association. Additionally, he owned a camp at Buck Mountain Point, on Long Lake, in the Adirondacks, and served as secretary for The Association for the Protection of the Adirondacks.

== R.M.S. Titanic ==
Henry and his wife Myra Raymond Harper (née Haxtun) boarded the Titanic at Cherbourg while returning from a five-month-long tour of Egypt and Sudan. Accompanying the Harpers was Hammad Hassab Bureik, an Egyptian dragoman, or interpreter, whom Henry had hired at the Shepheard's Hotel during their stop in Cairo because Hassab joked to Harper that "he wanted to see the country all the crazy Americans came from". Also with them was Mrs. Harper's prize Pekingese, coined Sun Yat-sen in honor of the first president of the Republic of China. Onboard Mr. and Mrs. Henry S. Harper occupied the First Class stateroom D-33, while Hassab was booked in D-49. Shortly after boarding the ship, Henry fell ill with tonsillitis and therefore spent much of his time in the cabin.

On the night of the sinking Henry and Myra Harper were fast asleep in their stateroom. Henry was awakened by a grinding noise, and looked out of his porthole to see an "iceberg only a few feet away, apparently racing aft at high speed and crumbling as it went." Having narrowly escaped the sinking of the SS Canima of the Cromwell Line in 1883, he knew the danger this incident put their ship in and insisted that Myra dressed at once and went upstairs. The ship's surgeon, Dr. William Francis Norman O'Loughlin, who visited Harper prior, first told him to undress and return to his bed, but soon returned to tell him that the "trunks were floating around" in the cargo hold and that they "may as well go on deck". Henry donned an overcoat while his wife put on a fur coat, and together with Hassab and their pet Pekingese they went on deck, on their way there stopping at the ship's Gymnasium. In his account published in Harper's Weekly, Harper described the confusion in the gymnasium as "rather like a stupid picnic, where you don't know anybody and wonder how soon you can get away from such a boresome place." Once on deck, Harper observed that Lifeboat 3 would float the longest out of the boats in the vicinity, so he allowed his wife and dragoman to step onto the craft, following shortly after seeing how there were no more women wishing to board.

Harper described the crew rowing and steering his lifeboat as "the young man who hires a boat on Central Park lake on Sunday and tries to show off." He remembered that seconds before the ship had sunk "there rose in the air a sort of wild maniacal chorus, a mingling of cries and yells in which I could distinguish voices of different tones. Many of the people, I fear, had gone mad as they felt the ship settle for her final plunge to the depths". Lifeboat 3, on which Mr. and Mrs. Harper, Hassab, and their dog were rescued on was picked up by the RMS Carpathia in the early hours of the morning on April 15, 1912. On board Harper was met by his old acquaintance, Louis Ogden. RMS Carpathia, with the Harpers on board, docked in New York City on April 18, 1912.

For the documentary Ghosts of the Abyss (2003), James Cameron sent a robot into the Harper's cabin and found Henry's bowler hat sitting on top of the remains of the wardrobe.

== In popular culture ==
- Henry S. Harper was portrayed by Anthony Kemble-Cooper in the TV series Kraft Television Theatre: Season 9: Episode 25: A Night to Remember (1965).
