= Wild Papa =

1925 film

- Directed by: Nicholas T. Barrows; J.A. Howe
- Written by: Malcolm Stuart Boylan; H. M. Walker
- Produced by: Hal Roach
- Starring: Oliver Hardy
- Cinematography: Robert Doran; Frank Young
- Edited by: Richard C. Currier
- Release date: May 17, 1925
- Country: United States
- Languages: Silent film English intertitles

Wild Papa is a 1925 American silent comedy film featuring Oliver Hardy.

== Plot ==
This plot summary comes from The Moving Picture World for May 16, 1925:

Brothers-in-law as business partners in a cloak and suit establishment with a ravishing model as go-between start off "Wild Papa," a Hal Roach comedy featuring the "Spat Family," with much hilarity. The comedy is just as "meaty" throughout with a great concoction of laugh punch at the end in the guise of a breach of promise suit. The married member of the firm scoffs at his partner's declaration that the beautiful model is in love with him. He proves otherwise when she enters the room. But she entwines her arms about his neck just as his wife appears on the scene. Much amusing slapstick stuff thereafter prevails. In the courtroom the plaintiff's version of the story is introduced on the screen. It shows her as an unsophisticated maiden romping about in the land of cows and grass. The defendant takes the stand and is about to tell the true story when he is instructed to read the defense concocted by his lawyer. In this he is pictured as the possessor of a lap dog and roller skates. The attorney releases a swarm of bees and the defendant is acquitted on the grounds of being "bughouse."

== Cast ==
- Frank Butler as Tewksbury Spat
- Laura Roessing as Mrs. Tewksbury
- Sidney D'Albrook as Ambrose
- Katherine Grant as The model
- George Rowe
- Jules Mendel
- Oliver Hardy as The model's brother (as Babe Hardy)

== See also ==
- List of American films of 1925
- Oliver Hardy filmography
