= Suicide Kings =

- Theatrical release poster
- Directed by: Peter O'Fallon
- Screenplay by: Josh McKinney; Gina Goldman; Wayne Rice
- Based on: The Hostage by Don Stanford
- Produced by: Morrie Eisenman; Wayne Rice
- Starring: Christopher Walken; Denis Leary; Sean Patrick Flanery; Johnny Galecki; Jay Mohr; Jeremy Sisto; Henry Thomas; Cliff DeYoung; Laura San Giacomo
- Cinematography: Christopher Baffa
- Edited by: Chris Peppe
- Music by: Graeme Revell
- Production company: Eyes 'n Rice
- Distributed by: Artisan Entertainment
- Release dates: September 6, 1997 (Toronto International Film Festival); April 17, 1998 (United States)
- Running time: 106 minutes
- Country: United States
- Language: English
- Budget: $5 million
- Box office: $1.7 million (US)

Suicide Kings is a 1997 American crime thriller black comedy film directed by Peter O'Fallon, and starring Christopher Walken, Denis Leary, Sean Patrick Flanery, Johnny Galecki, Jay Mohr, Jeremy Sisto and Henry Thomas. Based on Don Stanford's short story "The Hostage", the film follows the group of students who kidnap a respected former Mafia figure.

== Plot ==
Charlie Barret walks to his private table in a restaurant, only to see a group of young men sitting at his table – Avery, Max, and Brett. Charlie happens to know Avery's father, and, after an initial reluctance, is willing to go with the boys for a "night on the town". When they go out, the young men knock out Charlie and kidnap him.

When Charlie wakes up, he sees himself surrounded by the three men, and a fourth friend, T. K., who checks his vital signs. It is revealed that Charlie is Carlo Bartolucci, a former mob figure. The boys explain that Avery's sister, Elise, has been kidnapped, and that the kidnappers are demanding a $2 million ransom for her release. Unable to come up with the money on such short notice, they figure Charlie still has connections to get the money and set up an exchange. To ensure that Charlie knows how serious they are, Charlie is shown his cut-off finger, still wearing his signet ring, and is told that the same was done to Elise.

As Charlie requests continual alcoholic drinks and his blood does not properly clot, T. K., a medical student, explains that Charlie's alcoholism may cause him to die of blood loss if he is not taken to a hospital. Charlie contacts his lawyer, who in turn contacts Lono, Charlie's bodyguard, and asks him to track Charlie down. Lono goes about his own investigation, often using violent means. Meanwhile, Charlie seems to take perverse pleasure in playing mind games with his kidnappers. During the course of these conversations, Charlie unnerves the friends with stories of his early years as a gangster, especially concerning some former neighbors of his that he had killed and then fed their remains to their Dobermans. Another story was how he got his signet ring.

Meanwhile Marty, Charlie's attorney, conducts his own investigation. He speaks to Lydia, a successful madam, whose life Charlie had saved, many years ago, from her former lover and pimp. Lydia gives Marty a list of contacts.

As Lono searches for Charlie, Charlie takes advantage of the boys' naïveté. A fifth friend, Ira, shows up unexpectedly and demands an explanation. They tell him they are using his house under the cover story of a poker game. Ira is flustered by their carelessness in his parents' house and becomes even more worried when he realizes they have kidnapped a major figure in the mob.

Charlie plays the friends against each other, slowly getting information out of them and using it to his advantage. After much cajoling and piecing information together, Charlie identifies Max, Elise's boyfriend, as an inside man in front of the others. As his enraged friends plan to cut off his finger, Avery stops them by admitting that it was actually his plan, and says he recruited Max to help him. Avery had made several unlucky bets, could not pay off his debts, and was approached by mobsters who had purchased his debt. They offered him a way out: Become an inside man in his own sister's kidnapping.

Lono eventually makes his way to Ira's house and forces the young men to remove Charlie from his restraints. Around the same time, the money is sent to the two thugs who are demanding the ransom and they agree that Elise will be dropped off at a nearby hospital. Lono and Charlie drive away and Avery rushes to meet his sister at the appointed drop-off, but she does not appear.

Charlie and Lono track down the two kidnappers and demand the money back, who do not have the full amount. When Charlie and Lono demand to know where Elise is, they insist that they never kidnapped her, before Lono shoots them dead. It is revealed that Max and Elise set the whole thing up, splitting the ransom between them and the thugs. Charlie and Lono track Max and Elise to a boat off a tropical island where Lono shoots them both dead.

== Cast ==
- Christopher Walken as Carlo Bartolucci / Charlie Barret
- Denis Leary as Lono Veccio
- Henry Thomas as Avery Chasten
- Sean Patrick Flanery as Max Minot
- Jay Mohr as Brett Campbell
- Jeremy Sisto as T.K.
- Johnny Galecki as Ira Reder
- Frank Medrano as Heckle
- Brad Garrett as Jeckyll
- Louis Lombardi as Mickey
- Laura San Giacomo as Lydia
- Laura Harris as Elise Chasten
- Nina Siemaszko as Jennifer
- Cliff DeYoung as Marty

== Production ==
Suicide Kings was shot in Los Angeles.

The film also features two alternate endings. In one of them, Charlie allows Max and Elise to live, but reclaims the $1 million, giving them a small amount of the money back. In the other ending, Charlie allows them to live, but takes his money, after which Lono shoots holes in the boat, causing it to slowly sink. However, test audiences didn't like these endings as much, feeling that Max and Elise needed to pay for the betrayal of their friends and grief they had caused.

== Reception ==
Rotten Tomatoes, a review aggregator, reports that 34% of 32 surveyed critics gave the film a positive review; the average rating is 5.4/10. Metacritic, which uses a weighted average, assigned the film a score of 43 out of 100, based on 15 critics, indicating "mixed or average" reviews.

Joe Leydon of Variety wrote, "With a nod toward Quentin Tarantino and an appreciative wink at Lyle Kessler's Orphans, Suicide Kings is a smart and snappy drama tinged with dark humor and brimming with self-confidence." James Berardinelli of ReelViews wrote "while the narrative is a little too erratic to ascend to the Pulp Fiction level, the tone and style are on target. For those who aren't offended by extreme profanity and violence, Suicide Kings offers a kinetic and surprisingly funny two hours." David Luty of Film Journal International called it "a convoluted, senseless mess" that borrows too much from Tarantino. Stephen Holden of The New York Times wrote that the film will entertain those unconcerned about plot holes or credibility. Kevin Thomas of the Los Angeles Times called it "a smart B-picture with lots of A-pluses". Owen Gleiberman of Entertainment Weekly rated it C− and called it "another imitation of early Quentin Tarantino", as did Gene Siskel and Roger Ebert on their show.

== See also ==
- Tarantinoesque film
