= Peter O'Fallon =

American television director

- Born: Denver, Colorado, United States
- Education: University of Colorado Boulder
- Occupations: Television director, television writer, television producer, film director
- Years active: 1989–present

Peter O’Fallon is an American director, writer and Peter O’Fallon and show runner whose work moves effortlessly between cult films, edgy television, and award-winning commercials. He broke out with the pilot for American Gothic. then the indie crime cult favorite Suicide Kings and followed it with writing and directing, A Rumor of Angels, a feature starring Vanessa Redgrave and Ray Liotta. On TV, he created Mysterious Ways NBC, co-created Legit FX with Jim Jefferies, and The Flannerys for ABC. He helped launch a long run of character-driven series with directing 18 pilots and executive producing on shows like FIrefly Lane, The Riches, UnREAL, American Soul, Agent X, The Protector, and The Glades, and Eureka . He has also directed standout episodes of acclaimed series including House, Northern Exposure, Party of Five, Pushing Daisies .

== Biography ==
O’Fallon was born and raised in Colorado, and earned a degree in film studies from the University of Colorado Boulder. He began his career in commercials winning several Clio awards.

After directing the independent cult feature film Suicide Kings, starring Christopher Walken and Denis Leary, and co-writing and directing A Rumor of Angels for MGM, starring Vanessa Redgrave and Ray Liotta, O'Fallon created, directed the pilot, and show ran 'Mysterious Ways" 2000 NBC and Pax TV for 2 seasons. Then went on to direct 15 television pilots: American Gothic for CBS, That Was Then for ABC, Eureka for Syfy, The Flannerys (2003), Blade for Spike, and The Riches with Eddie Izzard and Minnie Driver for FX, for which O’Fallon also served as executive producer, and The Protector EP for lifetime, The Glades pilot and EP for A&E ., O’Fallon also co-created and directed Legit, pilot and series for FX a TV starring comedian Jim Jefferies. O’Fallon co-wrote all 26 episodes and directed 24 of them. He directed several episodes (including the pilot) of Agent X was an EP for TNT starring Sharon Stone. He worked as executive producer and director for Lifetime's pilot Unreal starring Constance Zimmer and Shiri Appleby. Directed the pilot and EP for Firefly Lane starring Kathrine Hiegl at Netflix. Directed the Pilot and EP for American Soul BET. EP for The Game Paramount +

== Filmography ==
Peter O'Fallon filmography
Film	Release year
Dead Silence	1991
Suicide Kings	1997
Odd Jobs	1997
A Rumor of Angels	2000

Television

=== Film ===
- 1997: Suicide Kings – Director
- 1998: A Rumor of Angels – Co-writer, Director

=== Television ===
- 1989–1990: Midnight Caller – Director (3 episodes)
- 1990–1991: Quantum Leap – Co-executive producer (24 episodes); Director (9 episodes)
- 1995–1996: American Gothic – Director (pilot)
- 1996–1998: JAG – Co-executive producer (7 episodes); Director (2 episodes)
- 1996–1997: Men Behaving Badly – Director (16 episodes)
- 1999–2002: Everybody Loves Raymond – Director (5 episodes)
- 1999–2004: The Practice – Director (8 episodes)
- 2000–2002: Mysterious Ways – Creator; Director (pilot); Showrunner
- 2000: That Was Then – Director (pilot)
- 2003: The Flannerys – Director (pilot)
- 2003–2009: Monk – Director (5 episodes)
- 2005: The Good Wife – Director (1 episode)
- 2006: Eureka – Director (pilot)
- 2006: Blade – Director (pilot)
- 2007–2008: The Riches – Executive producer; Director (pilot)
- 2010: The Glades – Executive producer; Director (pilot)
- 2011: The Protector – Executive producer (pilot)
- 2013–2014: Legit – Co-creator; Co-writer (26 episodes); Director (24 episodes)
- 2016: Agent X – Executive producer; Director (pilot)
- 2018: UnREAL – Executive producer; Director (pilot)
- 2019: American Soul – Executive producer; Director (pilot)
- 2021: Firefly Lane – Executive producer; Director (pilot)
- 2021: The Game – Executive producer

Pilots

American Gothic, Prey, Mysterious ways, That was Then, The Flannerys, Blade, Eureka, The Riches, The Glades, The Protector, Legit, Agent X, Unreal, American soul.

100 episodes of first 8 episodes of television series
