= Louis Ogden =

American lawyer (1867–1946)

- Born: January 12, 1867; Jersey City, New Jersey, U.S.
- Died: July 17, 1946 (aged 79); Sarasota, Florida, U.S.
- Occupation: Lawyer
- Known for: Taking photographs of Titanic lifeboats during rescue by Carpathia
- Spouse: Augusta McKim Davies
- Relatives: Alexander H. Rice (grandfather-in-law)

Louis Mansfield Ogden (January 12, 1867 – July 17, 1946) was an American lawyer who was a first-class passenger aboard the RMS Carpathia when the Titanic sank on April 14, 1912. Ogden and his wife Augusta were on deck during the rescue operation. He took a series of photographs of the lifeboats as they approached the rescue ship the following morning, the only known photographs on the rescue operation.

== Aboard the Carpathia ==
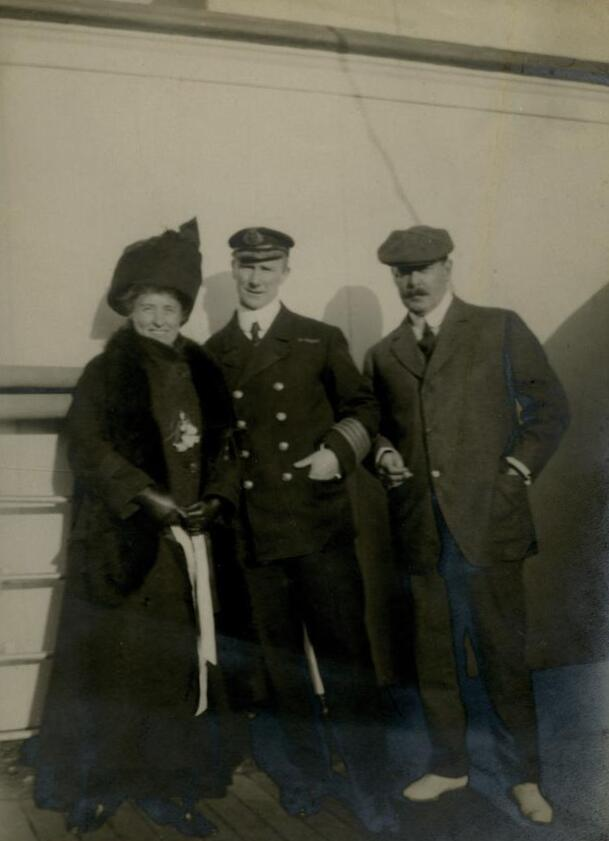
Ogden (right), with Captain Arthur Rostron (center) and his wife Augusta, one week after the Titanic disaster

Ogden was travelling aboard the Carpathia with his wife Augusta to the Mediterranean in April 1912. During the early hours of April 15, he was woken up by his wife Augusta who herself was woken up by noises outside. Recognizing the sound as lifeboats being swung out, Ogden got up to see what the issue was and was told by a quartermaster that the Titanic was in distress and "we are going north like hell."

According to his wife, Ogden did not believe the quartermaster's claim that Titanic was in distress but believed it was Carpathia in danger. He told his wife to dress warmly and they both got on deck. Though the pair eventually realized the ship was safe, they remained on deck. Augusta Ogden went and got their camera and, as the Titanic lifeboats approached Carpathia, Ogden took a series of photographs. He also took a photograph of the SS Californian as it approached the ship and wrecksite.

Afterwards, the Ogdens helped out the survivors as best as they could. Ogden was recognized by one of the survivors who turned out to be his friend Henry S. Harper who quipped, "Louis, how do you keep yourself looking so young?" They also helped out the Spedden family by giving them their cabin. At one point, he reportedly tried to offer help to some women who told him to "Go away. We just saw our husbands drown!"

Later on, Ogden assisted Archibald Gracie IV with his book The Truth about the Titanic. He also provided surviving Titanic officer Herbert Pitman with copies of his photographs which Pitman wished to have as keepsakes.

=== Photographs ===
Ogden's photographs are now preserved at the Royal Museums Greenwich.

Some of the photographs taken by Ogden

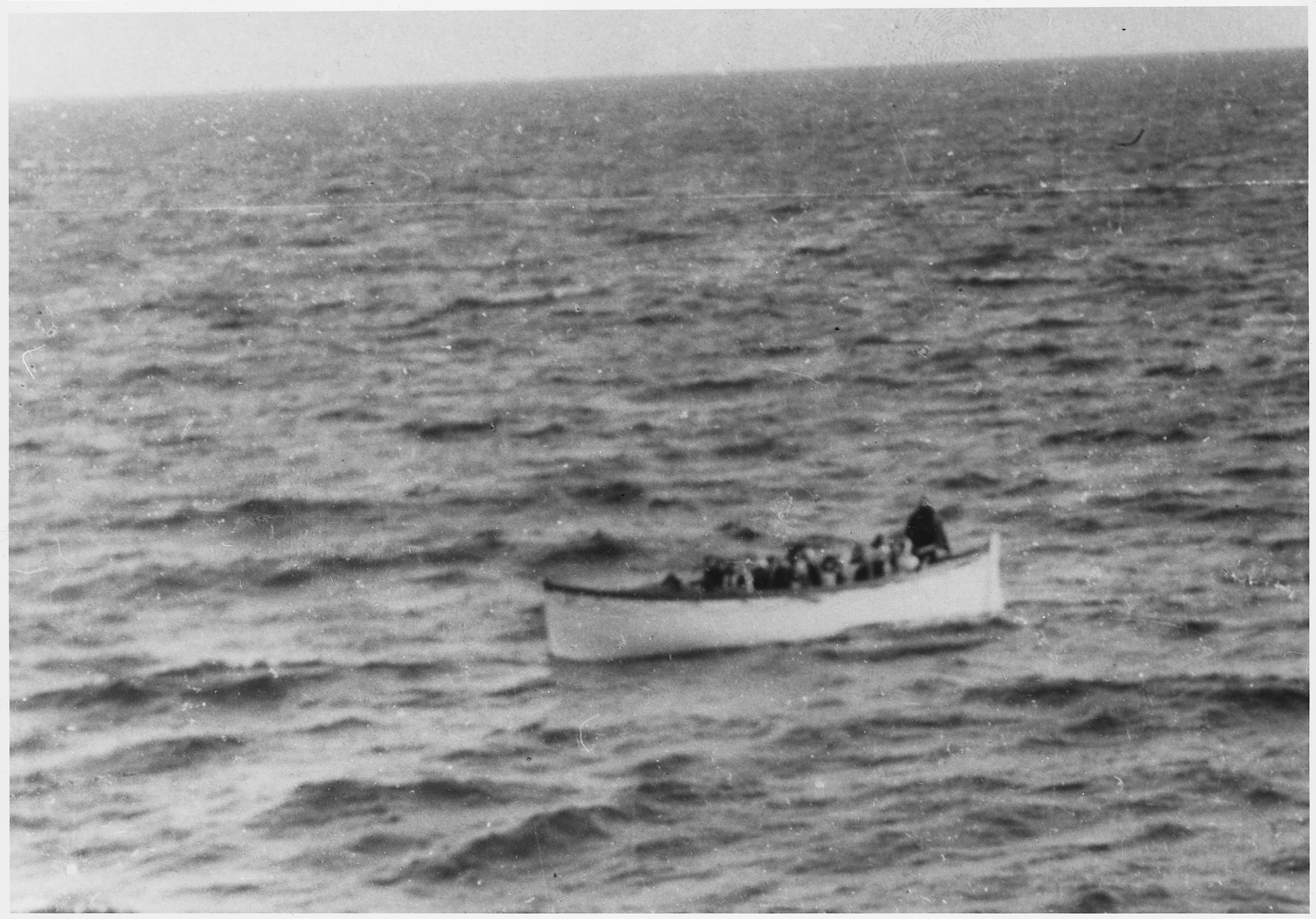
Titanic Lifeboat No. 6 at distance.

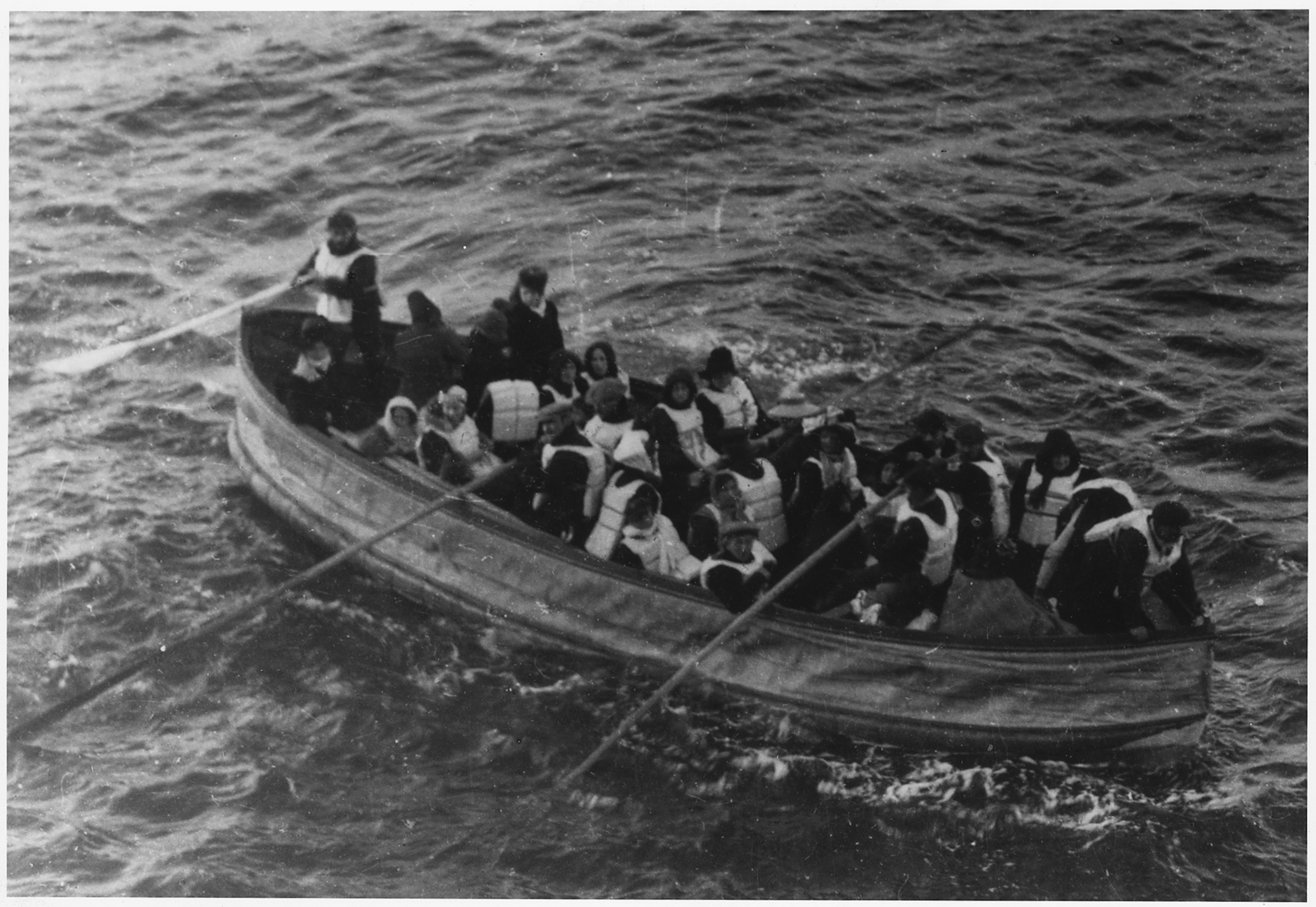
Collapsible Boat D approaching Carpathia.

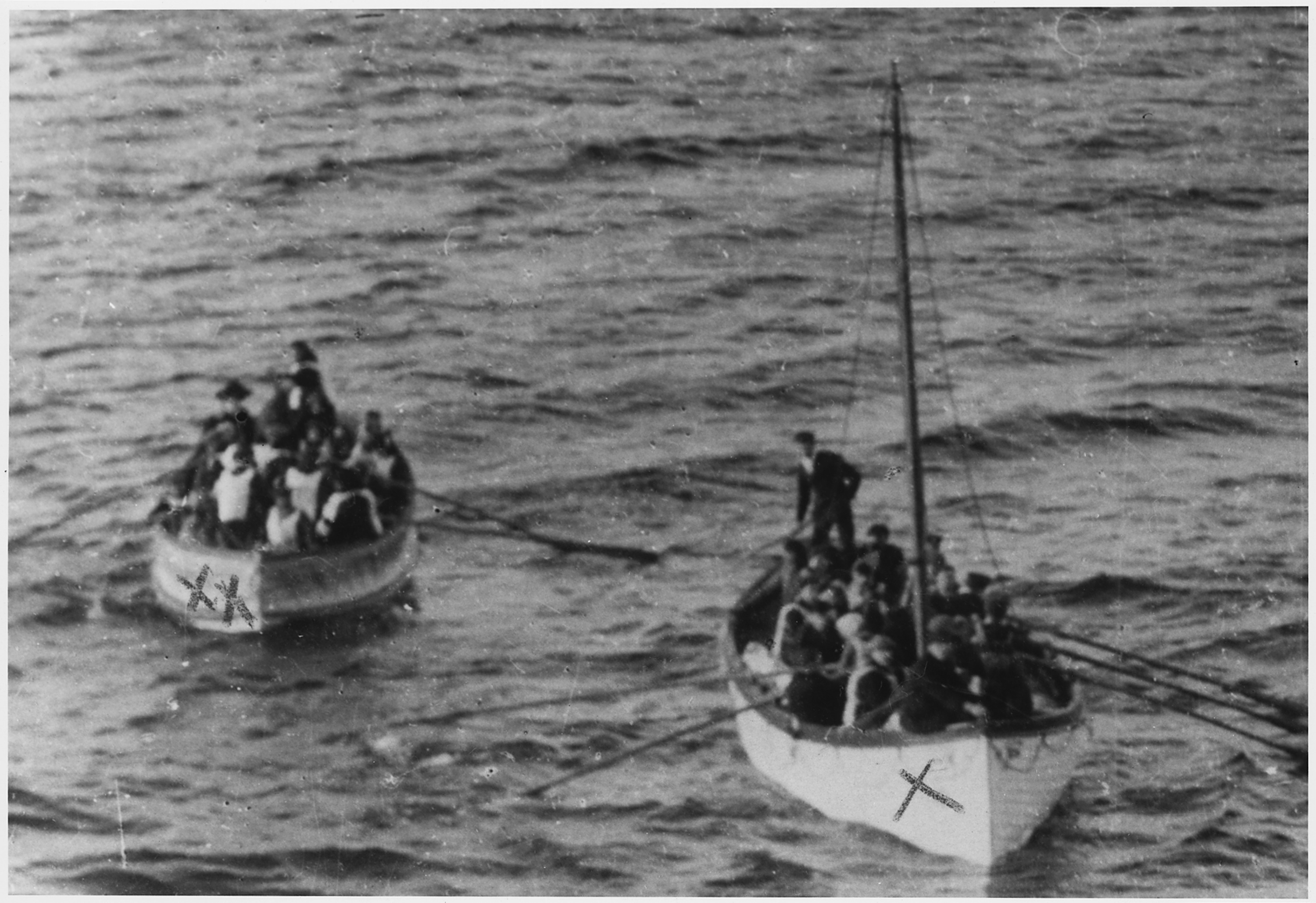
Lifeboat No. 14, with fifth officer Harold Lowe in charge, towing Boat D to Carpathia.

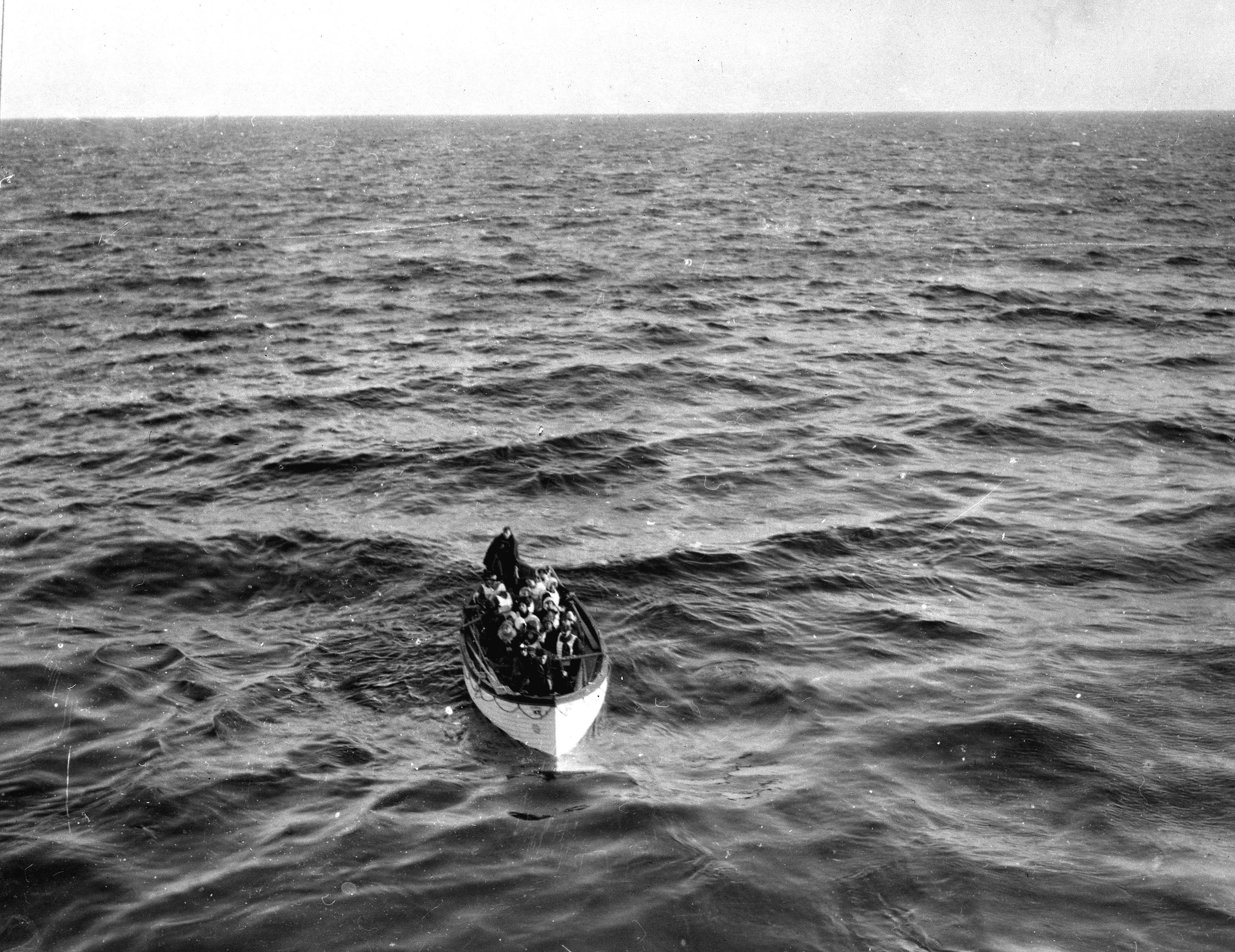
Titanic Lifeboat No. 6 approaching Carpathia.

== Personal life ==
Ogden was born in Jersey City, New Jersey in 1867 but spent most of his life in New York. He was married to August McKim Davies until his death in 1946, in Sarasota, Florida, where he and his wife had retired to. Augusta later spoke about their experience aboard RMS Carpathia with author Walter Lord for his book A Night to Rememeber, and provided a few photographs of Titanic's lifeboats Louis Ogden had taken.

Ogden and his wife are buried in St. Mary's-In-Tuxedo Church Cemetery, in Tuxedo Park, Orange County, New York.

== See also ==
- Bernice Palmer, fellow Carpathia passenger who took photographs of survivors on deck
- Francis Browne, RMS Titanic passenger who took some of the only known surviving photographs of the ship during the voyage; got off at Queenstown, Ireland
