= Bernice Palmer =

Canadian RMS Titanic photographer (1893–1989)

- Born: January 10, 1893; Waterloo, Ontario, Canada
- Died: February 11, 1989 (aged 96); Los Angeles, California, U.S
- Other name: Bernie
- Known for: Taking photographs of Titanic survivors aboard Carpathia
- Spouse: Bradford Hale Ellis (m. 1920; died 1932)
- Children: 1

Bernice "Bernie" Ellis (née Palmer; January 10, 1893 – February 11, 1989) was a Canadian woman who became known for taking the photographs of the Titanic disaster survivors and the iceberg believed to have caused the sinking of the ship in April 1912. Palmer captured photographs of Titanic survivors on the RMS Carpathia using a Kodak Brownie box camera she received as a gift.

== Early life ==
Born in Waterloo, Ontario, to Frederick Douglas Palmer, a US-born bookkeeper of English descent, and Florence Cleugh Brydon, a Scottish immigrant's daughter, Palmer grew up in Galt, Waterloo, Ontario. She had an elder brother named Douglas.

== Titanic disaster photographs ==
In April 1912, Palmer and her mother embarked on a Mediterranean cruise aboard the Cunard liner RMS Carpathia. Shortly after departing New York, Carpathia responded to the Titanic's distress call, rescuing over 700 survivors from the icy North Atlantic. Palmer used her Kodak Brownie camera to take photographs of the iceberg suspected of sinking the Titanic and snapshots of the survivors aboard the Carpathia.

Upon Carpathia's return to New York, a news blackout was imposed until all Titanic survivors had disembarked. Palmer sold the rights to her photographs to Underwood & Underwood for $10, not realizing their future value. These images became some of the only existing photographs documenting the aftermath of the Titanic disaster. In 1986, she donated her camera, the photographs, and other materials to the Smithsonian Institution.

== Legacy ==
Palmer married Bradford Hale Ellis on July 14, 1920, and had a daughter, Cara, in 1922. After being widowed in July 1932, Palmer never remarried. She became involved with the Titanic survivor community and formed a friendship with survivor Edwina Troutt Mackenzie. Palmer died in Los Angeles at the age of 96.

Her photographs remain a valuable historical record of the Titanic disaster, offering a unique perspective on one of the 20th century's most tragic maritime incidents.

== See also ==
- Louis Ogden, fellow Carpathia passenger who took photographs of Titanic's lifeboats during the rescue mission.
