= Heidemarie Fuentes =

American actress and producer

- Born: Germany
- Citizenship: United States
- Occupations: Actress, producer
- Known for: Mrs. Harris

Heidemarie Fuentes is an American actress and producer.

Fuentes is best known for such films as Hey DJ, Opie Gets Laid, Mrs. Harris and La Femme Vampir.
