= The Girl with the Hungry Eyes =

The Girl with the Hungry Eyes may refer to:

- "The Girl with the Hungry Eyes", a 1949 short story by Fritz Leiber about a pin-up girl as psychic vampire
- The Girl with the Hungry Eyes (anthology), a 1950s science fiction anthology published by Donald A. Wollheim
- "The Girl with the Hungry Eyes", a 1972 episode of the TV series Night Gallery adapted from the 1949 short story
- The Girl with the Hungry Eyes (1967 film), a 1967 film directed by William Rotsler
- The Girl with the Hungry Eyes (1995 film), directed by Jon Jacobs, adapted from the 1949 short story
- "Girl with the Hungry Eyes", a song from the 1979 Jefferson Starship album Freedom at Point Zero
