= Tina Wiseman =

American actress

- Born: Tina Leiu Wiseman; September 26, 1965; Honolulu, Hawaii, U.S.
- Died: February 20, 2005 (aged 39); Freeport, Bahamas
- Occupation: Actress
- Partner: Jon Jacobs
- Children: 1

Tina Wiseman (September 26, 1965 – February 20, 2005), also known as Tina Leiu, was an American actress.

Wiseman was born in Honolulu, Hawaii and is best known as the host of the Cinemax television series Hotel Erotica and films such as Kickboxing Academy, Chained Heat 3: Hell Mountain, Dark Confessions and Hey DJ.

Wiseman was also an accomplished singer. Her song "To The Club" was released in 2004 and quickly topped dance charts worldwide, and was in magazines as the club track of the year. She also performed additional songs with Spankox like "Telekinetic", "Storm Track", "Best Trouble" and "Island Girl" for the Hey DJ movie soundtrack, and afterwards the single "Anime Girl". She also inspired Jon 'Neverdie' Jacobs (later her fiancée) to make the song "Gamer Chick" and her avatar 'Island Girl' was seen in that video.

Wiseman died in the Bahamas on February 20, 2005, from pulmonary edema due to influenza. Her death inspired the developers of the game Entropia Universe to create 'Memorial Island', a virtual monument was placed on the island.
