= RevoLOUtion: The Transformation of Lou Benedetti =

- Directed by: Bret Carr
- Written by: Bret Carr; Quinn Redeker; Mary Shashy
- Produced by: Bret Carr; Noah Berlow; Alice Shashy; Mary Helen Shashy; Michael Kastenbaum
- Starring: Bret Carr; Burt Young; Ernest Mingione; Jon Jacobs; Kumar Pallana
- Edited by: Noah Berlow Bret Carr
- Music by: Bill Conti; Ashly Irwin; Dan Newman
- Release date: 2006
- Country: United States
- Language: English

RevoLOUtion: The Transformation of Lou Benedetti, also known as Revoloution, is a fictional dramedy co-written by Deer Hunter writer Quinn Redeker, with a theme by Rocky composer Bill Conti.

Directed, co-written by and starring Bret Carr, the film also features Burt Young, Starla Benford, Ernest Mingione, Freedom Williams, Suzanne Didonna, Jon Jacobs and Kumar Pallana. The film was produced by, Noah Berlow, Quinn Redeker, David Hausen, Helen Shashy, and Stephen Polk.

== Plot ==
RevoLOUtion is the fictional story of Lou, a stuttering ex-boxer who can only speak normally when starting trouble protecting the Brooklyn neighborhood in which he lives. Lou transforms from violent, extreme stutterer into a great, powerful communicator.

== Production and release ==
Carr shot additional scenes for the film every to two years since 1996, and having been rejected 5 years in a row from major film festivals, he eventually won or was nominated for Jury Prize and/or special distinctions at 14 of the top festivals such as Best Picture at Malibu Film Festival, Best Picture at San Francisco World Film Festival, Jury Prize Nomination at Slamdance Film Festival and others.

Quoting from Awareness Magazine, "the viewer so identifies with Carr's Oscar Caliber performance, that they are taken on a near death psychological journey with "Lou", and come out having had their own awakening."

Intent on reaching a wider audience, Vividas, the technology partners behind the documentary The Secret made RevoLOUtion their first dramatic film to be streamed online.
