= Opie Gets Laid =

2005 film by James Ricardo

- Film poster
- Directed by: James Ricardo
- Written by: James Ricardo
- Produced by: Heidemarie Fuentes; Christopher Gosch; James Ricardo; Rogina
- Starring: James Ricardo; April Wade; Ute Werner; Jesselynn Desmond
- Cinematography: Christopher Gosch
- Edited by: Thom Obarski; Christopher Gosch
- Production company: The Company Pictures
- Distributed by: Vivendi Entertainment
- Release dates: March 4, 2005 (Cinequest Film Festival); January 13, 2009 (United States)
- Running time: 75 minutes
- Country: United States
- Language: English
- Budget: US$100,000

Opie Gets Laid, originally titled Sunnyvale for its film festival submissions, is a 2005 American independent romantic comedy film written, directed and led by James Ricardo, also starring April Wade, Ute Werner and Jesselynn Desmond.

== Plot ==
At 30 years old, Opie (James Ricardo) is a virgin whose existence is made up of watching pornography and eating junk food. One day a drug dealer named Thai (April Wade) mistakenly comes to his door. She decides to help Opie by finding him a good woman, initially (and unsuccessfully) by online personal ads. Thai and Opie end up sleeping together while high on marijuana, then end up seeing each other regularly. Opie starts having sex with other women, including Thai's lesbian lover Dakota (Ute Werner) and a "gun-toting" nymphomaniac named Rain (Jesselynn Desmond).

== Cast ==
- James Ricardo as Opie
- April Wade as Thai
- Ute Werner as Dakota
- Jesselynn Desmond as Rain
- Gina DeVettori as Alicia
- Samantha Turk as Randi
- Heidemarie Fuentes as Jackie
- Mark Wood as Travis
- Hutchi Hancock as Kimmy
- Ellen Hughes as Mom
- Peder Fedde as Dad
- Michael L. Connelly as Mike

== Background ==
The film was shot at the Higgins Building in Los Angeles and in a New York City–style loft and is partly autobiographical. According to writer/director James Ricardo, it was [originally] called Sunnyvale because he "didn't know what else to call it": "Much like movie titles like Eraserhead. Sunnyvale is a comedic sounding title. It's a city that could only be in California." Under its new title it is distributed by Vivendi Entertainment.

== Critical response ==
The film was titled Sunnyvale during its film festival run and was the winner of the William Shatner Golden Groundhog Award for 'Best Underground Movie' of 2005. The award was described by critic Joshua Taylor as "maybe... just a veiled promotional tool for William Shatner's new DVD of the month club."

SFist wrote that "...writer/director James Ricardo also starred in the movie and he was definitely the weakest of the actors. So it was hard to tell if it was just wooden acting that make Ricardo, the character, so passive or if he was intended to be. Talking to other filmgoers about it afterward, we all seemed confused. No one really disliked it but everyone seemed unsure if they liked it really, or if they just wanted to like it."

DVD Talk offered that the film is "a lowbrow talking head comedy with a wittier than average script," and for "a first time director, Ricardo could have done much worse. His script is good, and he gets good performances from his three lead actresses." In making comparisons between Ricardo and directors such as Woody Allen and Clint Eastwood who have acted in films they were also directing, they made note that Ricardo's own lead performance as a deadpan Opie was serviceable, but had a stiffness that a director not himself in front of the camera might have caught. They summarized by stating the film "is a quirky romantic comedy about sex that has no sex and stars a cast of unknowns. But if you can get past that, you should be entertained."

DVD Verdict noted that the title and packaging led to expectations of a cheapo sex comedy featuring "clichéd plot developments and plenty of gratuitous nudity," but that the film "feels more like a stage adaptation than anything else", with sexual content only alluded to by dialogue scenes serving "as the 'before' and 'after' for dozens of brief but apparently successful sexual encounters". They commented that the "editing is tight, the dialogue is occasionally quite amusing, and the film rarely becomes terribly boring", noting "many individual attributes of merit here, so it's a little disappointing that the film as a whole doesn't quite gel". They commented that the character of Opie as written by Ricardo had much potential, but that as played by the director just was not interesting. They noted a paradox in that "Ricardo's performance suggests that he knows his writing is good," in that he "delivers the dialogue with a sort of smug assurance that feels more like a tell than like a natural extension of the character's personality". They concluded that the film "wins points for breaking some genre conventions" and that Ricardo and some of the other cast have potential for future films.
