= Ivelin Giro =

Cuban American actress

- Born: Cuba
- Occupation: Actress
- Years active: 2003–present

Ivelin Giro is a Cuban American actress best known for her role as Viviana Altamira de Rincón in the Spanish language telenovela ¿Dónde está Elisa?.

She appeared in the films Bad Boys II and Hey DJ, as well as the telenovela Valeria.
