= Navajo Blues =

- Directed by: Joey Travolta
- Written by: Richard Dillon
- Produced by: Joey Travolta; Ed O'Ross
- Starring: Steven Bauer; Irene Bedard; Charlotte Lewis
- Cinematography: Dan Heigh
- Music by: Scott Haynes
- Release date: 1996
- Country: United States
- Language: English

Navajo Blues is a 1996 American crime-action film produced and directed by Joey Travolta and starring Steven Bauer, Irene Bedard and Charlotte Lewis.

== Plot ==
A Las Vegas police detective hides out from the Mafia on a Navajo reservation overrun by ritualistic murders.

== Cast ==
- Steven Bauer as Nick Epps / John Cole
- Irene Bedard as Audrey Wyako
- Charlotte Lewis as Elizabeth Wyako
- Barry Donaldson as Robert
- Ed O'Ross as Not Lightning Struck
- George Yager as Stevens
- Tom Fridley as Toby Jr.
- Jack Bannon as Captain Hansen
- Michael Horse as Begay
- Billy Daydoge as Grandfather Wyako
- Israel Gonzales as John
- Heather Black as Amy
- Kenneth McCabe as Kincaid
- Addison Randall as Quimbly
