= Emotional Backgammon =

2003 film by Leon Herbert

- DVD cover
- Directed by: Leon Herbert
- Written by: Leon Herbert; Matthew Hope
- Produced by: Matthew Hope; Harry F. Rushton
- Starring: Leon Herbert; Wil Johnson; Daniela Lavender; Jacqueline de Peza; Tracey Vanessa Brown; Bob Mercer; Steve Weston; Steve Edwin
- Cinematography: Koutaiba Al-Janabi
- Edited by: Christopher Bird
- Music by: Paul Foss; Chris Nicolaides
- Distributed by: Odeon/Buccaneer
- Release dates: 29 August 2003; 14 December 2004 (DVD)
- Running time: 93 minutes
- Country: United Kingdom
- Language: English
- Budget: £6,000

Emotional Backgammon is a 2003 British independent comedy-drama about couples strategizing to repair relationships, with unexpected results. The film was written by Leon Herbert and Matthew Hope, directed by Herbert, and stars Herbert, Wil Johnson, Daniela Lavender, and Jacqueline de Peza. It is Herbert's first feature-length film. During its development it was featured on UK Channel 4's Movie Virgins series; upon its release, it received mixed reviews.

== Plot ==
John is crushed when his girlfriend, Mary, announces that she's leaving him to "find herself", at the very moment John was about to ask her to marry him. John seeks out advice from his best friend Steve on strategies to win her back. Steve uses backgammon as a metaphor for approaches to take, telling John to "roll the dice, for love is a game." At the same time, Mary begins taking advice from her best friend, also employing complicated strategies. It is revealed that both John and Jane share a bitter, complicated past.

== Cast ==
- Leon Herbert as Steve
- Wil Johnson as John
- Daniela Lavender as Mary
- Jacqueline de Peza as Jane
- Bob Mercer as Paul
- Steve Weston as Cab driver
- Steve Edwin as Psychiatrist
- Dee Cannon as Theatre Director

== Production ==
Herbert and Hope stated that, "The script idea was drawn from countless conversations with friends in problematic relationships. It is a story about emotional black-mail, but also an analysis of insecurities, and the charged and complex control tactics we resort to in the game of love." The film's production was featured on UK Channel 4's series Movie Virgins. With a budget of £6,000, it was shot on location in London, England "in a total of 18 days in July 1999" in 35mm by award-winning cinematographer Koutaiba Al-Janabi. Soundtrack artists included Kelly Le Roc, Lamarr, Incognito, David Lynden Hall, Fierce and Shola Ama (title track).

== Reception ==
The film was met with very mixed reviews. The BBC review called it neither "a diamond hiding in the rough, or even a half decent feature", referring to the acting as "woeful", the soundtrack "cloyingly overbearing", which "deadens each scene", and the films sexual politics "dubious, unironic, and completely uninterrogated." According to the reviewer, the film's lack of understanding of sexual politics is illustrated by Steve's taking a role in Shakespeare's Taming of the Shrew, and the film is a "clunking, and offensive, drama."

Rich Cline called the film an "enjoyable low-budget British relationship comedy [which] has a serious sting in its tale at the end that almost undoes it altogether." Cline enjoyed the film's "style and substance", "visuals" and acting, but found the plot to be similar to Two Can Play That Game. He appreciated the use of London locations, intercut with "witty fantasy sequences" for character point of view, but found the film to take "seriously disturbing turns" in which misogyny, "rape, murder, and homosexuality" are introduced at the climax of the film, and "seriously weaken the clever and funny film that went before."

Angela Swift wrote that even though she hoped it would succeed, and was prepared to grant considerable latitude for any faults, the film "unfortunately, does not measure up to our hopes or expectations." Some of the "admirable work" includes the nearly all-black cast, portraying "unabashed ethnicity" and the film's "almost clever" idea with "a few good twists". Swift found the backgammon-human-relationship simile to be overused, though visually interesting: "overkill drowns out any notion of ingenuity", and the film's repeated use of a pun on "Taming of the shrew" to be "without subtlety or insight." Overall, the film is "relatively unfunny and unsophisticated".

The Time Out reviewer wondered "Are Steve and Jane to blame for what ensues? Or [...] Shakespeare [...]?", and found that, although model/actor Johnson "manages to cut an intriguing figure, the film leaves the viewer perplexed. Is Herbert just playing with his audience? If so, it's a dangerous game."

According to The Guerrilla Film Maker's Handbook, the film grossed £1056, for 209 tickets sold.
