= Jackeline Olivier =

Brazilian actress (born 1977)

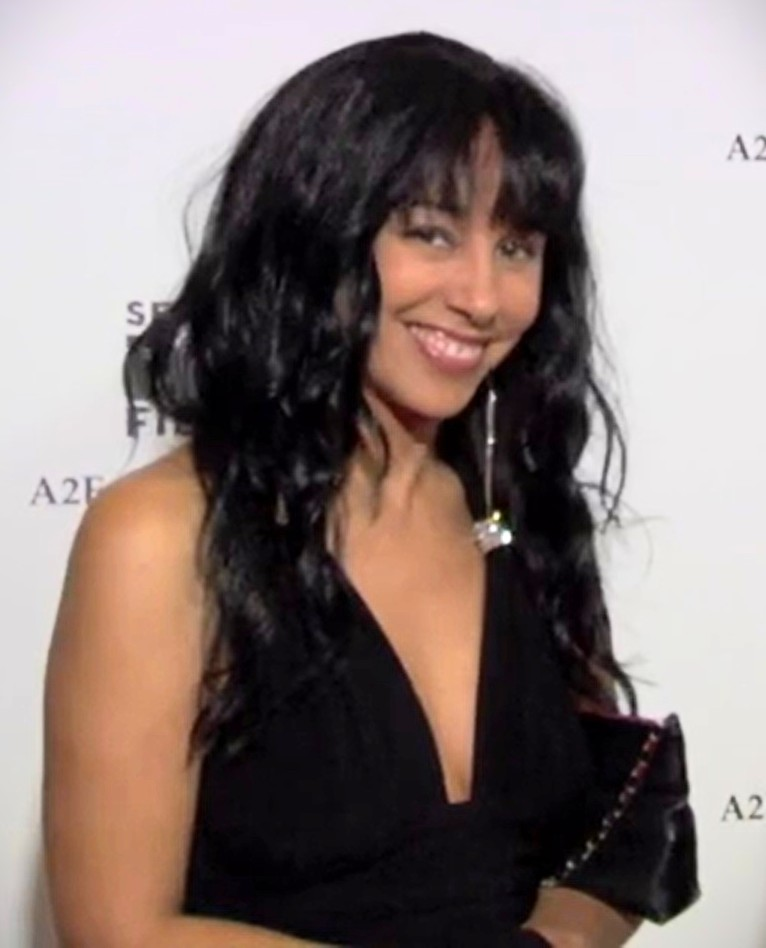
- Olivier in 2014
- Born: Jaqueline Cardoso de Oliveira; 29 September 1977 (age 48); Porto Alegre, Brazil
- Occupation: Actress
- Years active: 1999–present

Jackeline Olivier (born 29 September 1977) is a Brazilian actress. She has worked in such films as Fast Five and Rio 2.

Her other roles include the horror film Day of the Dead 2: Contagium and as Chi Chi in the ensemble romantic-comedy, Flick's Chicks.

== Early life ==
Jackeline Olivier was born in Porto Alegre. She was raised Catholic. She began her career early acting in school plays and appeared in some commercials. Olivier's first commercial, at 17, was modeling for a clothing store. When she was 22, she moved to São Paulo to pursue acting. She speaks fluent Portuguese and English.

== Filmography ==
Year	Film	Role	Notes
1993	Alma Corsária	Paula Nelson	
2003	SOCOM II U.S. Navy SEALs (video game)	Lianor the Interrogator	Voice
2003	Spy Kids 3-D: Game Over		Voice
2005	Day of the Dead 2: Contagium	Vicky	
2006	Legion: The Final Exorcism	Vanessa	
2006	Apartment 6	Agent Lowres	
2006	Hotel Erotica Cabo	Teena	
2006	Slip	Maria Vierra	
2006	Werewolf in a Women's Prison	Rita	
2008	Blood Scarab	Elana	
2008	In with Thieves	Eva	
2009	Junkie Nurse	Lida	
2010	Flick's Chicks	Chi Chi	
2011	The Lady and the Taxi Driver	Lucy	
2011	Fast Five		Voice
2014	Rio 2		Voice
