= Lucinda's Spell =

- Film poster
- Directed by: Jon Jacobs
- Written by: Jon Jacobs
- Produced by: Joe Chavez; Michael Kastenbaum; Jana Pasek; Tarwyn Tattersall; Truman Weatherly
- Starring: Christina Fulton; Jon Jacobs; Leon Herbert
- Cinematography: Jaime Reynoso
- Edited by: Clayton Halsey
- Music by: Nicki Jack
- Distributed by: Golden Shadow Pictures
- Release date: 1998
- Running time: 105 minutes
- Country: United States
- Language: English

Lucinda's Spell is a 1998 American fantasy film starring Christina Fulton, Jon Jacobs, and written and directed by Jon Jacobs.

== Plot ==
A wizard returns to Earth and lands in New Orleans in search of a mate. He runs into a call girl he slept with years which, unbeknownst to him, had resulted in her giving birth to his son.

== Critical reception ==
Lucinda's Spell received mixed reviews from critics. In Variety, Leonard Klady described the film as "a ribald saga with supernatural underpinnings" that was "equal parts comedy and social drama," calling it a "puzzling, if entertaining, whole." The film was also reviewed by Anita Gates of The New York Times.

== Home video ==
ADV Films released the film on DVD and VHS in October 2000.
