= Decoy (1995 film) =

1995 film by Vittorio Rambaldi

- Directed by: Vittorio Rambaldi
- Written by: Robert Sarno
- Produced by: Antonio F. Cortese; Gary D. Kaufman
- Starring: Peter Weller; Robert Patrick; Charlotte Lewis; Darlene Vogel
- Edited by: Frank Irvine; Jay Miracle
- Music by: Mark Adler
- Production companies: F.Y.D.O.E. Films; Floyd Group; Minds Eye Pictures
- Distributed by: Mind's Eye Pictures (Canada, limited); Prism Entertainment (U.S.)
- Release dates: August 3, 1995 (U.S.); December 2, 1995 (Regina, Sask.)
- Running time: 90 minutes
- Countries: Canada; United States
- Language: English
- Budget: CAD$2–3 million

Decoy is a 1995 Canadian–American action film directed by Vittorio Rambaldi and starring Peter Weller, Robert Patrick, Charlotte Lewis and Darlene Vogel.

== Plot ==
When a rival businessman, Jenner, threatens his daughter, Diana, tycoon John Wellington hires Secret Serviceman Jack Travis to protect her. In turn, Travis hires the eccentric mercenary Baxter, also a former Secret Service agent, to assist. So, Travis and Baxter are hired to protect his daughter. It all seems simple enough at the beginning, but shortly after the bodyguards meet Diana they quickly find themselves in an increasingly complex and deadly situation in which almost no one is exactly who she or he seems to be.

== Cast ==
- Peter Weller as Baxter
- Robert Patrick as Jack Travis
- Charlotte Lewis as Katya
- Darlene Vogel as Diana Wellington
- Peter Breck as John Wellington
- Scott Hylands as Jenner
- Vladimir Kulich as Daniel
- Zoltan Buday as Gunther
- Blaine Hart as Spence
- Patricia Drake as Madelaine
- Phil Hayes as Mick
- Brian Ludwig as Archer

== Production ==
=== Development ===
The movie was originally called Hunted. It was going to be shot in Mexico, but due to what was described as an "Indian rebellion" in Chiapas in winter 1993 (likely the Zapatista uprising), its completion guarantor blocked filming. Canadian Antonio Cortese, a partner in one of the film's Los Angeles-based production houses, Gary Kaufman's Buffalo Films, sent feelers to his country's film officials in February 1994. SaskFilm, Saskatchewan's film agency at the time, stepped in and brokered a co-production agreement with Kevin DeWalt's Mind's Eye Pictures of Regina, who was looking for a better deal than the production service contracts Canadian outfits usually received from their American counterparts. Rob King, De Walt's partner at Mind's Eye, scouted various locations in the province, before traveling to L.A. to rewrite the script with U.S. writer Robert Sarno, and inject it with Saskatchewan flavor.

The revamped project was pitched to distributor Prism Entertainmeny at the March 1994 American Film Market, and its boss Barry Collier pre-bought international rights, providing the biggest piece of financing. Through Lloyd Martell, a Cree from Waterhen Lake that Mind's Eye was mentoring as an associate producer, an agreement was found with the Kitsaki Development Corporation, a La Ronge aboriginal company. It invested CAD$250,000, which entailed filming on nearby tribal lands and hiring local residents as part of the crew. The project was billed as both the first international co-production and the first action film shot in the province.

Renowned effects specialist Carlo Rambaldi, the director's father, designed some of the film's more exotic weapons. Assembling a crew proved difficult as the Saskatchewan industry's small resources were stretched by the concurrent filming of a television film for CanWest, so technicians with local connections had to be lured back from larger production centers. The title Hunted was changed to Decoy during pre-production after receiving a cease and desist letter from the backers of the similarly named The Hunted, against whom a legal battle would have been too costly. The collaboration between the Canadian and American sides was reportedly so good that a press conference was organized during filming in Regina to announce a new six-picture, CAD$20 million co-production agreement. As part of the deal, a Regina warehouse would have been refurbished as a movie studio, which the province then did not yet have. However, there is no indication that the planned films entered production.

=== Casting ===
The two stars, Peter Weller and Robert Patrick, signed on in May 1994. Weller was swayed by his interest in aboriginal cultures. Patrick also indicated an interest in working with natives communities due to his partial Cherokee ancestry. From the producers' standpoint, the hiring of Weller and Patrick aimed to appeal to international buyers by pairing iconic actors from the RoboCop and Terminator franchises.

Auditions for the local supporting cast were held in June, right before filming. Blaine Hart, a high school acting teacher from Saskatoon, and Patricia Drake led the local cast. The part of Charlotte Lewis' sidekick Archer was going to be played by an experienced actor brought in from Vancouver, but he dropped out for a better offer in the U.S., and the role was recast with a newcomer from Regina. The producers reached out to the Saskatchewan Roughriders, Regina's professional gridiron football team, looking for big men to portray enforcers in the film. Four were selected: Peter Miller (who had some acting training), Ron Goetz, Gary Lewis and retired player turned radio analyst Carmelo Carteri. However, the latter three's scenes were scheduled for a Friday, which conflicted with the CFL calendar, so only Miller could appear.

=== Filming and post-production ===
Principal photography was scheduled between July 19 and August 17, 1994. The first part of filming took place in the Regina area, visiting such places as Wascana Centre and the Assiniboia Club. On July 28, the crew relocated to the Lac la Ronge region for the rest of the schedule. Their arrival generated great excitement in the small tribal community, particularly that of Carlo Rambaldi, due to his association with E.T.. The shoot employed 125 Saskatchewanians out of a 220-man payroll. According to DeWalt, natives amounted to 20 percent of on-screen performers and 20 percent of the crew. According to Martell, 70 percent of trainees were natives. Due to the unusually large distance between Regina and La Ronge, two production offices and two art departments had to be set up.

Weller practiced method acting, demanding to be called by his character name and being the only one on set to refuse ear plugs during gunfire sequences. Patrick was more laid back and would easily break character to chat with the locals. A bar brawl against a group of lumberjacks was planned but dropped from the script. On August 15, 1994, the crew had to suspend filming due to a sudden wildfire. Although the equipment suffered little damage, they lost several days. As a result, the film's wrap was delayed to August 24, although it still finished on budget. DeWalt refused to disclose specific numbers, only mentioning that the film's cost was "substantially into the seven figures." Local journalists estimated it between CAD$2 million and 3 million.

=== Post-production ===
The film was edited in Regina by veteran Vancouver editor Frank Irvine, although the audio part of post production was done in San Francisco. The score was also composed by San Francisco-based Mark Adler, and recorded by a local orchestra. The finished film was delivered on January 15, 1995, in line with projections.

== Release ==
=== Theatrical ===
Originally, it was announced that the film would open in Regina, Saskatoon, Prince Albert and Yorkton, in October 1995 with eyes on a possible touring release across Canada. In actuality, the film received an industry-only screening in Regina on December 1, 1995, which was inaccurately billed as its North American premiere (see Television below). The next day, it opened for the city's general public courtesy of local company Mind's Eye Pictures, a partner in the production. The release was originally billed as a one-week engagement, but was extended for a second week.

=== Television ===
In the U.S., the film was picked up by HBO for broadcast as part of its "World Premiere" collection, and debuted on August 3, 1995.

=== Home media ===
In Canada, the tape arrived through CFP Video in the week of December 12, 1995. CFP also issued a French tape under the title Piège de glace ('Ice Trap'). In the U.S., the film was released by Prism Entertainment, through their output deal with Turner Home Video, on December 19, 1995.

== Reception ==
Decoy has received mixed to moderately positive reviews. Patrick Davitt of the Regina Leader-Post criticized "a heavily-padded, below average action thriller, that manages to be cliched at its best and downright silly at its worst." He panned the gunplay as "ritualistic and uninteresting" with unscathed characters that stand out in the open. Conversely, Rich Ryan of the Staten Island Advance and the Newhouse News Service praised "a tense game of cat-and-mouse, with plenty of surprises and a great plot twist. All told, this is a cut above the average made-for-video movie." Ballantine Books' Video Movie Guide was mostly favorable, finding that while it was an "otherwise average kill-or-be-killed saga", it was "highlighted by its unusual characters, notably Peter Weller as a bald disciple of Cree mysticism." Writing for sister publications TV Guide and The Motion Picture Guide, Robert Pardi assessed: "Better acted than most routine bonebusters, Decoy gets less mileage out of its central trumped-up plot reversal than it does out of the bloodbrother relationship of principals Peter Weller and Robert Patrick.

== Lawsuit ==
In July 1996, stuntwoman Kathy Laloudakis filed suit against Weller and the film's producers, alleging that the star failed to pull a punch during the filming of a fight scene, resulting in a broken nose. The outcome of the case is unknown.
