= April Showers (2009 film) =

- Directed by: Andrew Robinson
- Written by: Andrew Robinson
- Based on: Columbine High School shootings 1999 shooting by Andrew Robinson
- Produced by: Jenna Edwards; April Wade
- Starring: Kelly Blatz; Daryl Sabara; Ellen Woglom; Illeana Douglas; Janel Parrish; Tom Arnold
- Distributed by: Indieflix
- Release date: April 24, 2009
- Running time: 94 minutes
- Country: United States
- Language: English

April Showers is a 2009 American independent drama film written and directed by Andrew Robinson. It stars Kelly Blatz, Daryl Sabara, Ellen Woglom, Illeana Douglas, Janel Parrish, and Tom Arnold. It is based on the Columbine High School shootings, of which Robinson is a survivor. The film was shot at Plattsmouth High School in Plattsmouth, Nebraska, in May 2008.

== Plot ==
In the aftermath of a school shooting, several survivors have evacuated to the elementary school to wait for more survivors to arrive. A senior named Sean Ryan calls his friend Vicki at a coffee shop, who tells him that the shooter is Ben Harris, a friend of Sean's. Sean is left speechless.

That morning, before the massacre begins, a student named Jason is being bullied and is struggling to pick up his books, but then Sean helps him. Sean reminds Jason that school is almost over and that he shouldn't let the bullying get to him. The two then go into their school, Jefferson High School; both are seniors there. It is a Monday, and Sean, his best friend Nick, and a few other students, are working on the school play. Sean learns that his friend Ben Harris, who works the lights, is absent, so Jason substitutes for him.

Later, during a lunch period, Sean talks to his math teacher, Martin Blackwell, about the crush he has on his friend, April Lauren. Mr. Blackwell tells him to let her know how he feels about her. Suddenly, the fire alarm rings, and everyone assumes that it is a senior prank. However, as they leave, they hear low rumbling. Mr. Blackwell and Sean then see a group of students, running for their lives and screaming. Three gunshots are heard, and everyone immediately realizes that someone is shooting a gun inside the school. Mr. Blackwell takes a group of students back into his classroom to hide, while Sean and Nick decide to flee for their lives, taking a panicked girl named Samantha ("Sam") with them.

Meanwhile, Jason is left to fend for himself, but he does manage to make it out of the school, carrying out the body of a dead girl in the process. Mr. Blackwell eventually decides to take his group of students and flee, but as they do, the shooter shoots him in the back from behind. Mr. Blackwell tells the students to run, but one student, Jonathan, instead drags Mr. Blackwell back into the math classroom. Jonathan attempts to save his life, but after several minutes, Mr. Blackwell tells him to wait in the closet until help arrives. Sean, Nick, Sam, and a few other students including their friend Mike, stumble upon a suburban area where the injured have evacuated. While searching for April, Sean runs into April's best friend, Jessica, who tells him that the police are having survivors congregate at an elementary school. Sean, Nick, and Mike then decide to go with Jessica.

Meanwhile, a SWAT team enters the school through the main entrance. A single gunshot is then heard, implying that the shooter has committed suicide. While searching, the police find Jonathan, but Jonathan is shocked to learn that Mr. Blackwell has died of his wounds. Jonathan goes into hysterics and blames himself for not doing anything to save him. The film then returns to the beginning scene, where Sean learns that the shooter is Ben. Sean is shocked after learning this, but Nick takes it the hardest, refusing to believe that Ben would cause any trouble. The last group of survivors then arrives, and Sean searches frantically for April. However, a teacher, Sally Reedman, comes in and informs Sean that April is dead.

Sean struggles to cope with April's death, and Jason learns that the security cameras at school captured him carrying the dead girl out, and that he is being hailed as a hero. Later, Sean learns that fourteen people, including Mr. Blackwell, April, and Ben, are dead. April's car is turned into a memorial, and a TV executive, Helen Mann, tries to help Jason cope with his dilemma by introducing him to Sam, believing she was the girl that Jason carried out, but Jason says that it wasn't her. The next night, as everyone learns Ben's motives for the shooting, Sean has a flashback about how he was unable to tell April about his feelings for her. This flashback causes him to break a mirror, cutting his hand in the process. Sean's father later takes him home.

Meanwhile, Jason's situation spirals out of control, causing him to have a mental breakdown in the middle of a grocery store. He later reveals to Sean that he doesn't believe himself to be a hero because he feels that he is responsible for the death of Matt, a student who bullied him. Later, Nick is released from police custody after falsely being suspected of helping Ben plan the shooting. He says goodbye to Sean and he and his family move away. Meanwhile, Jason commits suicide, unable to take any more of his "fame".

At April's funeral, Jessica gives Sean April's diary. After Sally, Jessica, and Sean perform eulogies for their fallen friend, Sean goes to April's grave and starts crying.

== Production notes ==
During the credits, the list of several school shootings from the past (including Columbine and Virginia Tech) are shown, along with the victims of the massacres. A message is then displayed about how officers are now trained to set up a perimeter and move toward gunfire in a school shooting situation since Columbine.

== Cast ==
- Kelly Blatz as Sean Ryan
- Daryl Sabara as Jason Gates
- Ellen Woglom as April Lauren
- Janel Parrish as Vicki
- Illeana Douglas as Sally Reedman
- Tom Arnold as Martin Blackwell
- Rachel Lien as Jessica
- Sean Durrie as Nick
- Bryan McClure as Jonathan
- Nina Rausch as Sam
- Mark Arnold as Sean's father
- Brenda O’Brien as Helen Mann
- William Grennan as Mike
- Ben Chrystak as Benjamin Harris
- April Wade as Relief Worker
