= Ellen Woglom =

American actress (born 1987)

- Born: Ellen Davis Woglom; April 18, 1987 (age 39)
- Occupation: Actress
- Years active: 2005–present

Ellen Woglom (born 1987) is an American actress best known for such films and television series as Crash, Outlaw, Wendy Wu: Homecoming Warrior, Hated, April Showers and Californication.

In 2017, she joined the cast of Inhumans.

== Filmography ==
=== Film ===
| Year | Title | Role | Notes |
|---|---|---|---|
| 2006 | Wendy Wu: Homecoming Warrior | Jessica Dawson | Disney Channel Original Movie |
| 2007 | Nameless | Sunset Vixen 1 | |
| 2007 | Dead Tone | Becky | |
| 2009 | April Showers | April | |
| 2010 | Privileged | Cara | |
| 2012 | Hated | Arryn | |
| 2012 | The Truth in Being Right | Julie | Short film |
| 2012 | A Little Something on the Side | Nikki | Short film |
| 2014 | Just Like Starting Over | Elise Chapman | |

=== Television ===
| Year | Title | Role | Notes |
|---|---|---|---|
| 2005 | The Bernie Mac Show | Saleswoman | Episode: "Wrestling with a Sticky Situation" |
| 2005 | CSI: NY | Briana Freemont | Episode: "Zoo York" |
| 2005 | Criminal Minds | Cherish Hanson | Episode: "The Popular Kids" |
| 2007 | The O.C. | Brynn | Episode: "The French Connection" |
| 2007 | Cold Case | Kim Jacobi | Episode: "Stalker" |
| 2007 | Viva Laughlin | Cheyenne Holden | Episodes: "Pilot", "What a Whale Wants" |
| 2008 | Ghost Whisperer | Jordan Lucas | Episode: "Heart & Soul" |
| 2009 | Law & Order: Special Victims Unit | Heather Hallander / Kristen Vucelik | Episode: "Stranger" |
| 2009 | Californication | Chelsea Koons | Recurring role (8 episodes) |
| 2009 | Crash | Lily | Recurring role (4 episodes) |
| 2010 | Outlaw | Mereta Stockman | Main role (8 episodes) |
| 2011 | The Defenders | Lona | Episode: "Nevada v. Wayne" |
| 2011 | Mr. Sunshine | Brooke | Episode: "The Best Man" |
| 2011 | Suburgatory | Aimee Ainsley | Episode: "The Nutcracker" |
| 2011 | My Freakin' Family | Anna | TV film |
| 2012 | Breakout Kings | Lorraine Hamilton | Episode: "Ain't Love (50) Grand?" |
| 2012 | Scandal | Helen Fisher | Episode: "Hell Hath No Fury" |
| 2013 | Untitled Greg Daniels & Robert Padnick | Maggie | Unsold TV pilot |
| 2013 | The Glades | Maddy Malone | Episode: "Civil War" |
| 2014 | Sullivan & Son | Nicolette | Episodes: "Luck of the Half Irish", "Open Mic Night" |
| 2015 | Chicago Fire | Megan | Episodes: "Three Bells" |
| 2015 | Chicago P.D. | Megan | Episodes: "A Little Devil Complex" |
| 2016 | Castle | Rachel Decker | Episodes: "Fidelis Ad Mortem" |
| 2017 | Inhumans | Louise Fisher | Main role |
| 2017 | Love at Sunset Terrace | Sophie | TV film |
