= Outlaw (TV series) =

American legal drama television series

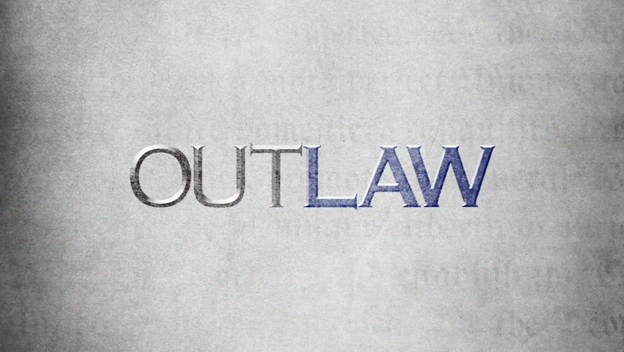
- Genre: Legal drama
- Created by: John Eisendrath
- Starring: Jimmy Smits; David Ramsey; Ellen Woglom; Carly Pope; Jesse Bradford
- Composer: James S. Levine
- Country of origin: United States
- Original language: English
- No. of seasons: 1
- No. of episodes: 8

Production
- Executive producers: Conan O'Brien; Jimmy Smits; John Eisendrath; Richard Schwartz; David Kissinger; Marcos Siega; Amanda Green; Lukas Reiter; Peter Elkoff
- Editor: Lauren A. Schaffer
- Running time: 43 minutes
- Production companies: Thanksgiving Day Productions; Conaco Productions; Universal Media Studios

Original release
- Network: NBC
- Release: September 15 – November 13, 2010

Outlaw is an American legal drama television series created by John Eisendrath that aired on NBC. The one-hour courtroom drama stars Jimmy Smits as a Supreme Court Justice, Cyrus Garza, who resigns from the bench and returns to private practice in an elite law firm where Claire Sax, love interest to Garza, is a powerful senior partner. As part of the deal, the firm has an ex–Supreme Court Justice on their staff of lawyers and Garza is allowed to pick his team and the cases he works.

The series premiered on Wednesday, September 15, 2010 (a day earlier in Canada), and began airing on Fridays beginning September 24. On October 11, 2010, NBC canceled the series after only four episodes had aired, due to low ratings. The series finale later aired on November 13, 2010.

== Development and production ==
The series was originally titled Rough Justice, and then briefly Garza. NBC green-lit the pilot, which was written by John Eisendrath, in late January 2010. In mid February, Terry George signed on to direct the pilot.

Jesse Bradford was the first actor cast in early March. Jimmy Smits was cast next to headline the drama. Carly Pope and David Ramsey came on board a few days later. Filming for the pilot took place in late March and April, with some exterior shots done in Philadelphia, Pennsylvania and neighboring Bensalem, Atlantic City, New Jersey, and in the Arlington, Virginia area.

NBC announced in mid-May 2010 that the network had picked up the pilot for the 2010–11 season. The series was expected to be produced in Los Angeles.

On October 6, NBC announced it had placed production of the series on hiatus due to low ratings for the first three episodes. The hiatus became permanent after ratings failed to improve for the October 8 broadcast. Eight of the planned thirteen episodes have been produced.

Four episodes had aired when NBC announced Outlaw's cancellation. The remaining four were burned off on Saturdays through November 13.

== Cast and characters ==
- Jimmy Smits as Cyrus Garza
- David Ramsey as Al Druzinsky
- Ellen Woglom as Mereta Stockman
- Carly Pope as Lucinda Pearl
- Jesse Bradford as Eddie Franks
- Melora Hardin as Claire Sax (recurring)

== Reception ==
As of September 15, 2010, Outlaw has an average score of 36/100 on Metacritic based on 23 reviews from television critics. Barry Garron of The Hollywood Reporter appreciated the potential of Outlaw though he called the premise preposterous and likened it to a fairy tale. John Doyle of The Globe and Mail said that Outlaw is "not the best advertisement for quality TV drama." Doyle concluded by saying the show is "for fans of melodramatic legal shows only."

In its first airing against CBS's new drama Blue Bloods, on September 24, 2010, Outlaw was watched by roughly 4.893 million viewers, while Blue Bloods was watched by 13.013 million.

== Episodes ==
The series premiered September 14, 2010 on Global in Canada and debuted in the U.S. on NBC on September 15, 2010. Though NBC moved Outlaw to Saturdays when they canceled the show Global continued to broadcast the remaining episodes on Fridays. All episodes of this show (apart from "Pilot") start with the phrase "In Re:".

| No. | Title | Directed by | Written by | Original release date | U.S. viewers (millions) |
|---|---|---|---|---|---|
| 1 | "Pilot" | Terry George | John Eisendrath | September 14, 2010 (Global); September 15, 2010 (NBC) | 10.68 |
When presented with being the deciding vote in a death penalty case Supreme Court Justice Cyrus Garza reflects on things his late father had said and his own conflicted life. After deciding in favor of a new trial Justice Garza announces his resignation from the Supreme Court and becomes the defense attorney for the convicted cop killer whom he had just granted a new trial. Garza's team have some uncertainties about the transition from the Supreme Court to private practice and the addition of a private investigator to the team. When Lucinda mentions the distinct lack of evidence in the case they begin to look into why there is so little evidence and find what they need to save a man's life.
| 2 | "In Re: Officer Daniel Hale" | Timothy Busfield | Lukas Reiter | September 24, 2010 | 4.893 |
An immigration stop that ends with a policeman shooting an American citizen leads Garza and the team to Arizona. However, the client Garza takes on is a shock to the entire team. While Eddie agrees the team should take the controversial case, Al doubts his decision to join Garza in the first place. On a personal front, Mereta finds an ally in Lucinda, who encourages her to make a move on Garza.
| 3 | "In Re: Jessica Davis" | Peter O'Fallon | Stephanie Sengupta | October 1, 2010 | 4.720 |
Garza and the team find themselves trapped in a difficult situation after an infant dies from exposure in a hot car, and the mother shows no emotion. Taking the case under the Equal Protection Clause, Garza needs Mereta and Al to help prove her innocence. Eddie and Lucinda have trials of their own covering one of Al's former clients.
| 4 | "In Re: Curtis Farwell" | Marcos Siega | John Eisendrath | October 8, 2010 | 4.096 |
Garza and his team go head to head against a car manufacturer to prove that the company is knowingly putting lives at risk by not recalling cars with a dangerous flaw. This case hits a personal note with the former justice who was involved in a car accident of his own.
| 5 | "In Re: Tracy Vidalin" | Liz Friedlander | Jorge Zamacona | October 15, 2010 (Global); October 16, 2010 (NBC) | 3.4 |
When a confession is entered as proof that the girlfriend of a police killer is guilty of the murder, Garza and Al must find out if a Miranda Rights violation occurred. The violation would disregard the confession and protect the girl's right to remain silent. Further complicating the incident is the fact that this defendant is the daughter of Cyrus' nemesis Senator Sidney Vidalin. Eddie and Mereta follow their own investigation when they dig into Lucinda's past and discover something shocking.
| 6 | "In Re: Tyler Banks" | Steve Shill | Michael Reisz | October 22, 2010 (Global); October 23, 2010 (NBC) | 3.2 |
Garza fights to save the life of a foster kid, who needs a liver transplant but—as is the case all over the country—has been dumped off the transplant list just because he is in care.
| 7 | "In Re: Kelvin Jones" | Tim Hunter | Lukas Reiter, John Eisendrath, Adam Armus, & Kay Foster | November 5, 2010 (Global); November 6, 2010 (NBC) | 3.5 |
Kelvin Jones, an ambitious student who started many programs to improve his school and was wanting to go to Duke University, is killed in a gang shooting in the courtyard of the Cyrus Garza School in Hastings, Alabama. After visiting the school and seeing the systemic neglect Garza files a lawsuit against the school and the school district for the wrongful death of Kelvin Jones. When the wrongful death suit fails Garza amends the filing to a class action suit against the entire county "for the willful and deliberate segregation of the public schools in violation of the Fourteenth Amendment". Lucinda becomes the prime suspect in the murder of the man who had been stalking her, trying to get her to tell him where his daughter is.
| 8 | "In Re: Tony Mejia" | Marcos Siega | Peter Elkoff | November 12, 2010 (Global); November 13, 2010 (NBC) | 3.390 |
The White House asks Garza to go to Mexico to extradite the brutal murderer of a California school teacher. With the victim's father present in court, the killer is sentenced by a Mexican court to 25 years in their prison. Later, the father finds the murderer in a bar and, in a fit of rage, grabs a police officer's gun and kills him, then flees back to Los Angeles. To avoid a diplomatic crisis, Garza must now return the father to Mexico to stand trial for murder.

== International broadcasts ==
- Australia: Will begin airing after November 28, 2010 on Seven Network at 9:30 p.m., and it has been confirmed the entire season will air during the summer non-ratings period.

== Home releases ==
On January 24, 2011, in conjunction with Amazon.com's manufactured-on-demand (MOD) program, a DVD of all eight episodes of the series was released. The cover art consists of the promotional poster, with a Universal logo and border around it.

== See also ==
- Supreme Court of the United States in fiction
