= Lost Angelas =

- Film poster
- Directed by: William Wayne
- Written by: William Wayne; Jen Zias
- Starring: Korrina Rico; Jon Jacobs; William Wayne; Charlotte Lewis
- Release date: 2019
- Running time: 88 minutes
- Country: United States
- Language: English

Lost Angelas is a 2019 American neo-noir psychological thriller film about the search for a missing actress directed by William Wayne.

The film was shown at Method Fest Independent Film Festival 2019.

Jon Jacobs won the Outstanding Performance Award at the Method Fest for his performance as Walt Warshaw, the nefarious and notorious filmmaker.

The US release date was June 14, 2019, in Los Angeles at the Laemmle Playhouse 7.

Lost Angelas played for one week at the Grand Illusion Theater in Seattle

At Film Threat Magazine's 2020 Award this! William Wayne won for best Director and Lost Angelas won for Indie made for less than the contents of an Oscar gift Bag ($100K)
