= Terry Camilleri =

Maltese-born Australian actor (born 1949)

- Born: Terrance Camilleri; 7 November 1949 (age 76); British Malta
- Occupation: Actor
- Years active: 1971–2019
- Known for: Bill & Ted's Excellent Adventure

Terrance Camilleri (born 7 November 1949) is a Maltese-born Australian actor who has performed actively in both the United Kingdom and United States. He is best recognised for portraying Emperor Napoleon I in the blockbuster comedy film Bill & Ted's Excellent Adventure (1989).

== Biography ==
Camilleri was born in British Malta, and made his feature film debut in Peter Weir's 1974 film The Cars That Ate Paris. He appeared in the 1983 film Superman III. He also had a role in Peter Weir's The Truman Show.

Other appearances include as Special Branch Investigator Hemmings in the science fiction film Incident at Raven's Gate.

In 2003, he appeared in the American film Hey DJ.

In 2006, as part of the World Cup campaign in Australia, Camilleri played the character of "History" for the Nike "Stuff History" advertisements, which was part of Nike's soccer Joga Bonito adverts.

In 2009, Camilleri appeared as a cashier in the science fiction-thriller film Knowing.

In 2015, Camilleri co-starred in the family film Oddball.

== Filmography ==
=== Film ===
Year	Titie	Role	Type
1974	The Cars That Ate Paris	Arthur Waldo	Feature film
1976	God Knows Why, But It Works	Gree Miner	Film
1977	Out of It	Jacko	
1977	Backroads	Jean Claude	Feature film
1978	The Death Train	Taxi Driver (uncredited)	TV movie
1978	The Night the Prowler	The Prowler	Feature film
1978	Cass	Roger, an editor	TV movie
1978	Money Movers	Dino	Feature film
1978	Blue Fin	Truckie	Feature film
1982	Ginger Meggs	Mr. Crackett	Feature film
1982	Kitty and the Bagman	Railway detective	Feature film
1983	Midnite Spares	Harry Diaz	Feature film
1983	Superman III	Delivery Man	Feature film
1986	Let's Get Harry	Mercenary	Feature film
1987	Dutch Treat	Morris Klaverman the Booking Agent	Feature film
1987	In the Mood	Mr Browning, Judy's Lawyer	Feature film
1988	Incident at Raven's Gate	Special Branch Investigator Hemmings	Feature film
1989	Bill & Ted's Excellent Adventure	Napoleon	Feature film
1994	Witch Hunt	Minister	TV movie
1996	Split Milk	Sparky	Film
1998	The Truman Show	Man in Bathtub	Feature film
1998	Inferno	Harry	TV movie
1999	The Invisibles	Le Pizza Guy	Feature film
1999	Evicted	Colonel Perry	Feature film
1999	Here Lies Lonely	Archie	Feature film
2001	Foolish Minds	Tony	Feature film
2002	Pizza Wars: The Movie	Voice	Animated feature film
2003	7 Songs	Kato - Chauffeur	Feature film
2003	Henry X	General Jean Jacques Ramond	Feature film
2003	Paris	Poker Player #2	Feature film
2003	Gigli	Man in Dryer	Feature film
2003	Hey DJ	Johnson	Feature film
2006	The Virgin of Juarez	Man in Brothel	Feature film
2006	Wil	Reuben Schindel	Feature film
2009	Knowing	Cashier	Feature film
2009	Coffin Rock	Tony	Feature film
2011	A Heartbeat Away	Gino	Feature film
2015	Oddball	Judge Burns	Feature film
2016	The Death and Life of Otto Bloom	Bob Simkin	Feature film
2017	Limestone Cowboy	Mr. Charles Hancock	Feature film

=== Television ===
Year	Titls	Role	Type
1971	Division 4	Neighbour	TV series
1972	The Aunty Jack Show		TV series
1974	Class of '75	Carlo Soporetti	TV series
1974	Silent Number	Lewis	TV series
1976	Luke's Kingdom	Trigger	TV miniseries
1976	The Emigrants	Angelo	TV series
1977	Chopper Squad	Bill Cox	TV series
1980	King's Men	Johnny Dollar	TV series
1985	George Burns Comedy Week	Suitcase Man	TV series
1986	Hill Street Blues	Tenant	TV series
1995	Love and War	Poker Player	TV series
1995–96	Renegade	Tony O'Malley	TV series
1997	NYPD Blue	Super	TV series
1998	Pacific Blue	Hot Dog Man	TV series
2000	JAG	Sheriff's Officer	Episode: "Boomerang, Part II"
2000	18 Wheels of Justice	Benn the Bailer	TV series
2003	The District	Jerry	TV series
2005	Blue Heelers	Ted Garnett	TV series
2009	Carla Cametti PD	Mr. Tinti	TV miniseries
2015 / 2017	Longmire	Theo / Bank Customer	TV series
2019	Preacher	Old Man	TV series
