= Kee Nang =

Character from The Golden Child

- Charlotte Lewis as Kee Nang
- Created by: Dennis Feldman
- Portrayed by: Charlotte Lewis

In-universe information
- Occupation: Priestess
- Family: The Old Man (father)
- Significant other: Chandler Jarrell
- Home: Tibet

Kee Nang is a fictional character who appears in Michael Ritchie's 1986 film The Golden Child. She is portrayed by English actress Charlotte Lewis.

== Character arc ==
Kee Nang is a young Tibetan priestess who tries to recruit social worker and private investigator Chandler Jarrell (Eddie Murphy) in hope of finding and rescuing a mystical Tibetan boy. The boy, who is only known as "The Golden Child" (J.L. Reate), has been kidnapped by an evil sorcerer (Charles Dance) named Sardo Numspa.

Kee tells a skeptical Chandler that it is his destiny (as it was written in a Tibetan scroll 400-years prior) to find the Golden Child. Chandler at first, plays along but mainly to get close and flirt with Kee, only to soon realize that not only is otherworldly magic real, but so is his destiny.

Chandler was already working on a case involving a missing and eventually murdered girl named Cheryll Mosley, when Kee saw him on television. Sardo Numpa's forces drained Cheryll of blood in order to try and fool the Golden Child into consuming the blood, thus weakening his powers. These powers in particular, consists of telekinesis and the ability to bring dead animals back to life.

When Chandler asks Kee why they were trying to feed the child blood-soaked oatmeal, she responds by saying that she doesn't know but that “There is somebody we could ask about the blood.” This leads the two to an apothecary-type store run by Doctor Hong (James Hong). Downstairs into the brick basement, they meet a mysterious librarian behind a three-paned screen named Kala (Shakti Chen). She tells Chandler that Sardo wants the Golden Child to eat blood because if he polluted himself with anything impure, he would become vulnerable.

Sardo Numpsa later enters Chandler makes a deal with Chandler via a dream sequence, that he will give over the Golden Child if he can retrieve the Ajanti Dagger. Kee Nang meanwhile, is tied-up with toilet paper while wearing a black leather bodice. Unbeknownst to Chandler and Kee, is that Sardo needs the dagger to kill the Golden Child.

So Chandler and Kee jet off to Nepal in order to find the dagger. After Chandler succeeds in solving a mythical task of carefully carrying a cup of water while traversing through a dangerous cave, a high priest says to Kee that magnificent Americans have so much power but also, so little understanding of what to do with them. While in Katmandu, Chandler asks Kee's father, the Old Man for some love advice. The Old Man soon gives his blessing to Kee to marry Chandler.

Back in Los Angeles, Chandler and Kee are taken to a safe house. After initially resisting his advances, Kee Nang finally decides to invite Chandler into her bed only for him to decline in favor of sleeping on the couch.

But soon, Sardo and his men arrive and take out the guards. Kee ultimately gives her life to save Chandler from Sardo's crossbow bolt, but not before telling him that she loves him. Doctor Hong and Kala tell Chandler that he has until sundown to rescue the Golden Child in order to bring Kee back to life.

After locating the Golden Child's location, which is an empty mansion, they are chased by the Sardo, who has transformed into a winged demon. On the way back to the basement of Doctor Hong's shop, where Kee's body is resting, Chandler is able to kill Sardo with the Ajanti Dagger and the Golden Child is able to restore Kee back to life by lifting her foot of into a beam of sunlight, where it touches her toes.

The film concludes with Chandler, Kee, and the Golden Child taking a walk while discussing the child’s return to Tibet and (as Chandler jokingly suggests) the boy’s prospective fame as a stage magician.

== Development and background ==
Kee Nang initially appears as a mysterious, stoic, non-observant, Westernized woman. Kee is the daughter of “The Old Man” from Tibet (Victor Wong) and she enjoys respect from the secluded Tibetan monks.

Kee is also an expert in kung fu and saves Chandler from a gang of bikers after initially being told to wait in his car. Chandler in return, erotically dreams of saving her instead and becoming her hero. She is soon left to question her beliefs as she begins to fall for Chandler.

Kee Nang as a character, arguably represents the Lotus Blossom image, with her sexual availability and idea of exoticism. She in particular, is on the surface, very quiet and meek, yet also holds characteristics of being subservient, and willing to sacrifice herself for Chandler.

Ken Chase was the makeup designer and creator and Steve La Porte was the key makeup artist for Charlotte Lewis in The Golden Child. Lewis is in actuality, primary of white ethnic background being born in the United Kingdom, and her father being half Chilean and half Iraqi. Producer David Kirkpatrick would later write that he nervous about the romantic scene between Charlotte Lewis and Eddie Murphy in The Golden Child. Kirkpatrick added that Lewis was a lovely British actress with a dark complexion. She as previously noted, was Irish, Chilean, and Iranian. And when there was a kiss between her and Murphy, no one, according to Kirkpatrick ripped up the seats. So he felt that they he had found the right girl to kiss the black star.

Charlotte Lewis was at the time, an 18-year-old model-turned-actress. A Los Angeles Daily News article dated on March 25, 1986, announced Charlotte Lewis as the final choice for the role of Kee Nang and claimed it would be the “first time Eddie Murphy has been romantically involved on screen.” The casting director for Pirates recommended her The Golden Child. Lewis was selected from over 500 applicants. Lewis was paid $150,000 (a little under £100,000) for The Golden Child.

Eddie Murphy when describing the film said that “It’s about this guy who was living his normal life and this person comes and says, ‘You are the chosen one. You’ve been chosen to save the world.’ He's like, ‘Really?’ My character throughout the whole picture is reluctant to go on this journey. He starts to slowly believe what this woman is telling him. There are strong contrasts in the film. Charlotte's character, Kee Nang, is a mystical, magical person. My character is this guy with strong common sense solving an illogical thing with logic. It's a nice contrast.”

Meanwhile, Lewis said that she actually thought that she was going to Tibet since that was where The Golden Child was set. In actuality, the Tibet as seen in The Golden Child was to be a set at Paramount, with a little location shooting at a ski resort called Mammoth Mountain five hours from Los Angeles. According to Lewis, so much money was spent re-creating Tibet in California that it would have been cheaper to actually fly to the country.

Karen Elaina Price was Charlotte Lewis' stunt double for The Golden Child, mainly providing Kee Nang's flips. Otherwise, Lewis would claim that did all of her character's fight scenes herself. Yūko Mizutani did the Japanese dubbing for Charlotte Lewis. In the scene where Sardo is the aiming the crossbow at Chandler as he's running, Kee can be spotted hiding behind a post, seemingly looking to the side and waiting for her turn to get into the shot.

== Legacy and allusions ==
Aiden Mason of TV Overmind suggested that Kee Nang bore similarities to Chun-Li from Capcom's Street Fighter video game series. In August 2020, Lovell Porter from the website Blaque Rabbit, suggested that Jessica Henwick should play Kee Nang in a hypothetical remake of The Golden Child.

== Reception ==
Dave Kehr of the Chicago Tribune said that Eddie Murphy's companion as played by Charlotte Lewis, is a beautiful Eurasian woman who leaps, chops and backflips with all the unflappable springiness of Bruce Lee, but director Michael Ritchie employs her chiefly as cheesecake. Kehr particularly made note that when Lewis bounds through the air, it's merely an excuse to look up her dress.

Michael Wilmington of the Los Angeles Times wrote that as the inscrutable kung fu princess Kee Nang, the fetching Charlotte Lewis hardly qualifies as a straight woman to Eddie Murphy.

Roger Ebert of the Chicago Sun-Times said that Lewis as the preternaturally beautiful heroine Kee Nang, won her an audience of dozens in Roman Polanski's Pirates and that The Golden Child will likely do a lot better. Ebert added that Lewis looks very beautiful, and because that is her role in this movie, she fulfills it flawlessly. Lewis also according to Ebert, succeeds in keeping a straight face while Eddie Murphy uses her as the subject of speculation, rejection, romance and betrayal, and while she uses her effortless mastery of kung fu to protect him.

Candice Russell of the South Florida Sun-Sentinel believed that the love that Eddie Murphy's Chandler Jarrell feels for Kee Nang is perplexing. Russell went further by saying that she may be an exotic full-lipped beauty but she has the demeanor of an ice princess who doesn't thaw out or even kiss him till the final scene. Russell believed that the scantiest credibility of their romance is hurt because she treats Jarrell like a dimwitted servant.

Leonard Maltin in his review of The Golden Child, simply wrote that Charlotte Lewis was more wooden than most ex-models. Meanwhile, Paul Attanasio of the Washington Post wrote that Lewis is simply a prop in an affair that is less a romance than an a' la carte order of Murph 'n' Turf.

Janet Maslin of the New York Times said that Charlotte Lewis, who would be better off left to simply stand by and look statuesque, is forced to simulate some exceptionally fake-looking gymnastics. And she according to Maslin, is no less credible doing back-flips than Eddie Murphy is talking to a character who's supposed to be half-dragon.

Nadia Ramoutar in a 2006 study from the University of Florida noted that Charlotte Lewis' character in The Golden Child can leap over tall walls or from high buildings, usually just wearing Eddie Murphy’s shirt and her underwear.

Liz Bourke of Tor.com complained that Kee Nang's role in the film represents a really specific yet irritatingly common brand of seemingly-progressive-but-actually-sexist portrayals of female characters that in her mind, no one seems to have named yet. Bourke said that it's a slightly more evolved modern version of the trope in which exactly one female is allowed per a giant cast of males. Not only that, but Bourke questioned why Kee wasn't actually the hero of the film instead of the supposed "Chosen One" in Chandler Jarrell.
