= Jon Jacobs =

English actor and director (born 1966)

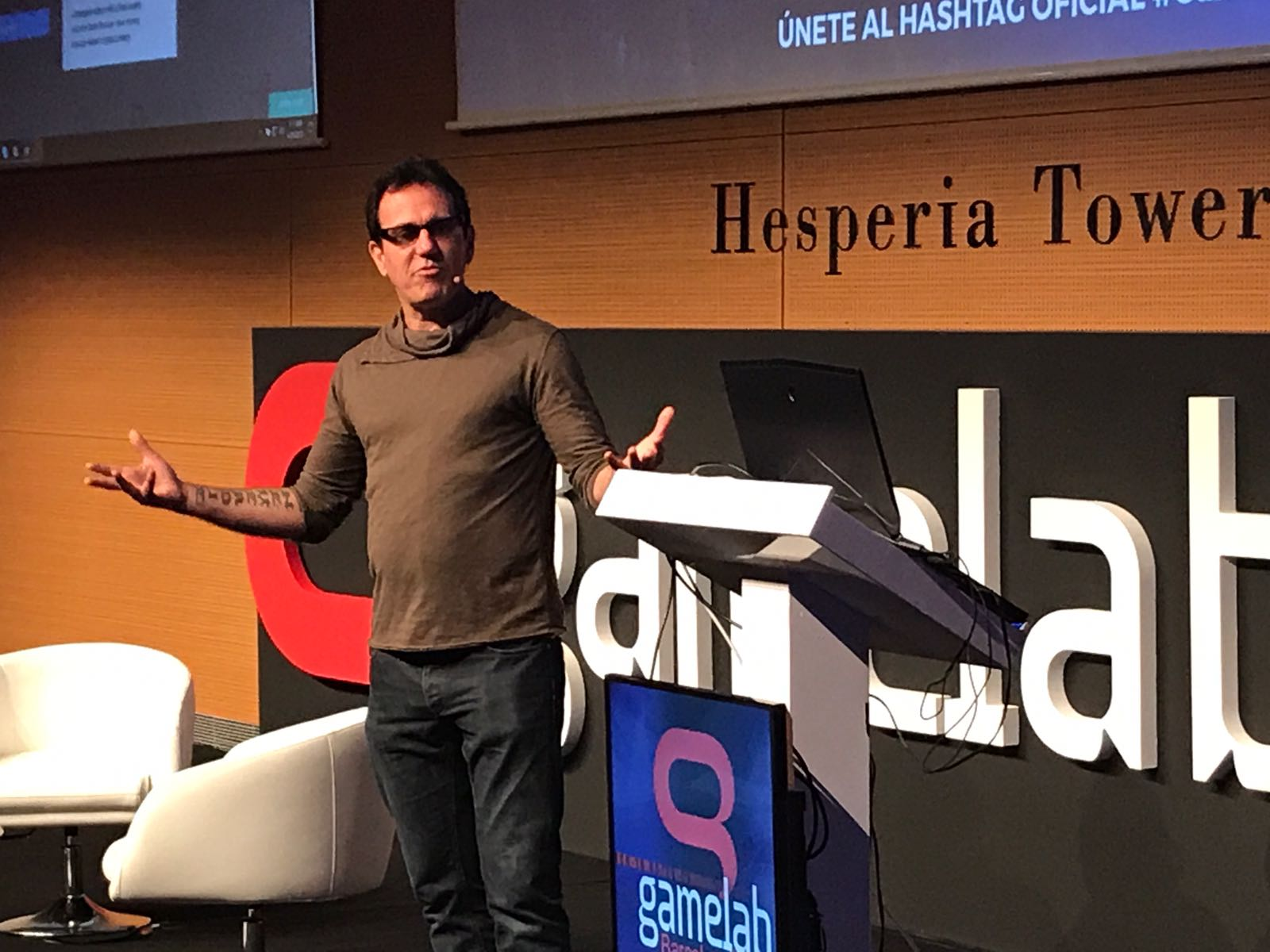
- Jacobs in 2017
- Born: 10 September 1966 (age 60); Derbyshire, England, UK
- Occupations: Actor, entrepreneur, director, producer, writer
- Known for: Lucinda's Spell; Hey DJ
- Spouse: Cheri London (m. 3 August 2006)
- Partner(s): Tina Wiseman ( – 20 February 2005)
- Children: 3
- Website: neverdie.com

Jon Jacobs (born 10 September 1966 in Derbyshire, England) is an English actor, entrepreneur, director, producer, writer, and creator of the avatar Neverdie from the virtual world Entropia Universe.

As a film actor, director, and producer, Jacobs is best known for films such as The Girl with the Hungry Eyes, Lucinda's Spell, Charlotte Sometimes, Hey DJ, and RevoLOUtion.

== Biography ==
Jon Jacobs grew up in London. His mother, Jackie White, was Miss United Kingdom in 1962. His father, Adrian Jacobs, was a financier. Jacobs was expelled from the British stage school Sylvia Young's in 1981. In 1986 he made his screen debut in the short film Salette. Jon followed up by directing and acting in Metropolis Apocalypse and Moonlight Resurrection. Metropolis Apocalypse was an official selection in the Semaine de' la critique at the Cannes Film Festival 1988. Jacobs's first lead role in a feature film was Welcome Says the Angel. He played the lead in the films Johnny Famous, and Lucinda's Spell.

In 1992, Jacobs wrote and directed The Girl with the Hungry Eyes, which was executive produced by Cassian Elwes. In 1995, Jacobs wrote, directed, and starred in the micro-budget feature The Wooden Gun, a period black and white Western.

In 2002, Jacobs created the "Neverdie" avatar inside the Entropia Universe. In 2005, he co-directed and starred as DJ Hound Dog in the electronic dance movie Hey DJ.

In 2005, Jacobs mortgaged his home to buy a virtual asteroid for US$100,000, being the most valuable virtual item ever sold at that time. In 2010 Jon Jacobs sold the Asteroid Space Resort to various other Entropia Universe participants for a total of US$635,000.

Jacobs's avatar subsequently appeared in the Discovery Channel documentaries Gamer Generation and I, Videogame, it also appeared in the Canal+ documentary La Vraie vie des mondes virtuels.

In 2008, Jacobs founded NEVERDIE Studios to create entertainment-driven virtual worlds on the Entropia Platform. Planets produced by NEVERDIE Studios have included Rocktropia and Next Island.

Also in 2011, NEVERDIE Studios started working with Universal Pictures; the first title to launch was Hunt The Thing, a film-length MMO inspired by both John Carpenter's 1982 version of The Thing and the 2011 prequel.

In 2015, NEVERDIE Studios announced the launch of a new virtual King Kong trilogy in collaboration with Universal Licensing and Partnerships, set in the ROCKtropia virtual world and based on the 2005 film King Kong, directed by Peter Jackson. The first title in the trilogy, Zombie King, features the tagline "King Kong is Back! ...From the Dead!"

In April 2016, Jon Jacobs revealed his plan to create three million jobs in virtual reality by 2030 through the privatization of teleportation, the primary public transport system in the MMO Entropia Universe.

In 2019, Jacobs acted in the role of Walt Warshaw in the psychological thriller Lost Angelas. Jacobs won the Outstanding Performance Award at Method Fest Independent Film Festival.

In 2023, Jon Jacobs won the "Seymour Cassel Award for Best Actor" at the Oldenburg International Film Festival for his portrayal of indie film producer Cassian Elwes in Elwes' directorial debut Passenger C.

== See also ==
- Entropia Universe
- Anshe Chung
