= Hotel Erotica =

American softcore porn anthology TV show

- Genre: Softcore pornography
- Written by: A. G. Lawrence
- Starring: Tina Wiseman; Lauren Hays
- Country of origin: United States
- Original language: English
- No. of seasons: 2
- No. of episodes: 26

Production
- Running time: 29 minutes
- Production companies: Blue Hotel Productions; HBO Entertainment

Original release
- Network: Cinemax
- Release: October 4, 2002 – December 26, 2003

Hotel Erotica is a softcore porn anthology television show that was broadcast on the Cinemax cable television channel. It was also broadcast in the after hours timeslot on The Movie Network.

The show format usually involved the hotel's proprietor reading a letter from a former guest talking about their adventure at the hotel. The episode would then be a flashback of the guest coming to the hotel and falling in love with someone. The hotel proprietor was initially Chloe Wilson (played by Lauren Hays) in the first season. In the second season it was Jenny (played by Tina Wiseman). Three years later, the show was relaunched as Hotel Erotica Cabo, which followed a similar format.

Many notable softcore and hardcore porn stars appeared on the show, such as Beverly Lynne, Monique Parent, Angela Davies, Jenna Jameson, Ron Jeremy, and future WWE wrestler Candice Michelle. Hotel Erotica was created, produced, and directed by Gary Orona.

Several episodes were filmed at the Sorrel River Ranch Resort in Moab, Utah.

== Episodes ==
=== Season 1 (2002) ===
1. "X-Treme Sports" – October 4, 2002
2. "Model Behavior" – October 11, 2002
3. "The Fast and the Curious" – October 18, 2002
4. "Chat Room" – October 25, 2002
5. "She's the Boss" – November 1, 2002
6. "Chasing Jamie" – November 8, 2002
7. "Falling in Lust Again" – November 15, 2002
8. "Blue Plate Special" – November 22, 2002
9. "Legally Yours" – November 29, 2002
10. "Heart's Desire" – December 6, 2002
11. "The Competition" – December 13, 2002
12. "Lust Takes a Holiday" – December 20, 2002
13. "Love Potion No. 10" – December 27, 2002

=== Season 2 (2003) ===
1. "Maid Service" – October 3, 2003
2. "Talking Dirty" – October 10, 2003
3. "Stakeout" – October 17, 2003
4. "Lisa Comes Out" – October 24, 2003
5. "Opposites Attract" – October 31, 2003
6. "High School Crush" – November 7, 2003
7. "Bewitched & Bewildered" – November 14, 2003
8. "The Hookup" – November 21, 2003
9. "Kat & Mouse" – November 28, 2003
10. "Screwed Up" – December 5, 2003
11. "Layover" – December 12, 2003
12. "Hot and Bothered" – December 19, 2003
13. "Secret Admirer" – December 26, 2003
