= Christina Fulton =

American actress (born 1967)

- Born: Boise, Idaho, U.S.
- Occupation: Actress
- Children: 1

Christina Fulton is an American actress.

== Career ==
Fulton has worked as a model with Elite Model Management and with LA Models. She was the face of Farlow Jeans and modeled for the "Too Cute" campaign.

Fulton has had roles in such films as Oliver Stone's The Doors as Velvet Underground singer Nico, Bram Stoker's Dracula, Dangerous Game, The Girl with the Hungry Eyes, Enemies of Laughter, Lucinda's Spell and Snake Eyes.

Fulton hosts a weekly online show, Playing It Forward.

In 2006, Fulton directed and produced the documentary When Giants Collide about the plight of Beverly Hills High School's wrestling program being on the brink of extinction.

== Personal life ==
Fulton has a son, Weston Coppola Cage (born 1990), with actor Nicolas Cage.

Fulton was engaged to Shagrath, vocalist of the black metal band Dimmu Borgir, in 2008.

In July 2024, Weston was arrested following an incident which involved assaulting numerous people, including his mother, with a deadly weapon at a party which occurred over two months beforehand; he would be released on a $150,000 bond.
