= Daniela Lavender =

Brazilian actress

- Born: Daniela Barbosa de Carneiro; 14 December 1974 (age 51); Bahia, Brazil
- Other name: Daniela Kingsley
- Occupation: Actress
- Years active: 2000–present
- Spouses: Ben Lavender (m. 1996; div. 2003) Ben Kingsley (m. 2007)

Daniela Lavender, Lady Kingsley (née Barbosa de Carneiro; 14 December 1974) is a Brazilian actress, appearing on Brazilian television and on English-language television, film and stage, including touring with the British Shakespeare Company.

== Early life ==
Lavender was born in Bahia, Brazil, daughter of a policeman father and English teacher mother. At the age of eight, Lavender began training in ballet, jazz and contemporary dance. Lavender studied Flamenco dancing under Roberto Amaral and received a journalism degree from Pontifical Catholic University of Rio de Janeiro. She studied drama at Dirceu de Mattos school in Rio de Janeiro, studied English for a year and traveled to London. She auditioned for the London International School of Performing Arts, playing Queen Anne from Shakespeare's Richard III, and passed the audition in spite of the language barrier.

== Acting career ==
Lavender appeared in the low budget independent film Emotional Backgammon (2003) and was awarded "Best Actress" at the Denver Film Festival. She appeared in Ali G Indahouse and the BBC series Longitude, EastEnders, and Casualty. Lavender toured with the British Shakespeare Company production of A Midsummer Night's Dream in 2009, playing Hippolyta and Titania. She made her theatre debut at London's Tabard Theatre in March 2011 in A Woman Alone (produced by Jason Greer).

== Other work ==
Lavender has supported Action for Brazil's Children Trust (ABC) as an ambassador, to raise awareness and funding to assist the disadvantaged.

== Personal life ==
In her professional life, Lavender uses the surname of her first husband, Ben Lavender, to whom she was married from 1996 to 2003. Her second husband is actor Ben Kingsley, whom she married on 3 September 2007.

== Filmography ==
=== Film and television ===
Year	Title
2000	Longitude
2001	Down to Earth
2001	Casualty
2002	Ali G Indahouse
2002	Manchild
2003	Emotional Backgammon
2003	EastEnders
2004	Paixão Crua
2009	Midsummer Night's Dream
2009	Precious
2010	The Scientist
2013	A Birder's Guide to Everything
2015	Tut
2018	Backstabbing for Beginners
2018	Paper Year
2018	Intrigo: Death of an Author
2018	Night Hunter
2019	A Dog's Journey

=== Theatre ===
Year	Title	Venue
2011	A Woman Alone	Tabard Theatre
	Viva Maria	Ovalhouse
	The Beelzebub Sonata	Gate Theatre
	Steel Magnolias	The Troubadour
	Tartuffe	The Troubadour
	Sexual Perversity in Chicago	The Troubadour
	Lysistrata	The Troubadour
	A Voice Screaming to Heaven	The Troubadour
	Viva O Povo Brasileiro	Shanty Towns
	Lanterna De Fogo	Princesa Isabel
	Trouser Press	Independent
	Nick Cave	
	Mulheres De Areia	
