= Day of the Dead 2: Contagium =

- DVD cover
- Directed by: Ana Clavell; James Dudelson
- Written by: Ryan Carrassi; Ana Clavell
- Produced by: James Glenn Dudelson
- Starring: Justin Ipock; Laurie Maria Baranyay; John F. Henry III
- Cinematography: James M. LeGoy
- Edited by: Ana Clavell
- Music by: Chris Anderson
- Production company: Taurus Entertainment Company
- Distributed by: Anchor Bay Entertainment
- Release date: October 18, 2005
- Running time: 103 minutes
- Country: United States
- Languages: English; Russian
- Budget: $1 million

Day of the Dead 2: Contagium is a 2005 horror film written by Ana Clavell and directed by Clavell and James Dudelson, starring Justin Ipock, Laurie Maria Baranyay and John F. Henry III. It was unofficially marketed as a prequel and sequel to 1985's Day of the Dead. The film was released direct-to-video in the United States on October 18, 2005.

== Plot ==
In 1968, an infected Soviet man, Rubinsky, is being operated on at a military hospital when soldiers arrive and begin to shoot all of those who are in the building. One of the hospital students steals a strange vial, enclosing it in his thermos. He is later shot by the soldiers as he attempts to escape through the woods and the thermos is dropped. The soldiers in the hospital continue to kill any one that has been in contact with the infected man. The zombies are killed when explosives are detonated by sharpshooters outside the hospital.

Thirty-seven years later, a group of patients at the same hospital, consisting of Boris, Jackie, Isaac, Sam, and their doctor, Donwynn, uncover a strange thermos buried in the soil in the yard of a hospital. Sam attempts to open it, but they are unable due to it being rusted shut. Donwynn entrusts Sam with keeping it safe, but Isaac feels that something bad will happen if the thermos is opened. While Sam and Boris are distracted with watching a movie, Jackie sneaks away with the thermos and runs to the bathroom to open it. Sam discovers that Jackie stole the thermos, and with Boris, Isaac, and Emma, they go to the bathroom to talk him out of opening it. Jackie opens the thermos, and a strange object falls from it, unknowingly releasing a virus, infecting the entire group. Doctor Heller talks to Donwynn about his patients’ behavior and claims that Jackie and the other patients are breaking the rules of the hospital. That night, those who were in the bathroom begin to show signs of sickness. Donwynn contacts a friend about the item that was in the thermos.

The next day, Donwynn awakes to discover Sam having a seizure and the rest discover that they all have skin on their bodies that is dead and peeling. Emma has tests run on her, and she is told that she is pregnant. Emma attacks Marshall when he keeps bothering her about the results of her test, and she bites him on the arm, infecting him. Sam, Jackie and Boris begin to show advanced signs of infection, including rotting flesh, varicose veins, and coughing up blood. Marshall is quarantined because of the infection from the bite. Dr. Heller puts the hospital under a full quarantine and gives the doctors the right to bear arms, along with orders to shoot anyone from Dorm 1 in the head that attacks them. Donwynn receives a video from his friend who says not to open the thermos because it contains a deadly virus that mutates human DNA. Donwynn informs Sam that he plans to visit the hospital the next day. Marshall dies of his infection that night.

The next morning, everyone is called to the front desk of the hospital to receive a vial of medicine. Ava informs Donwynn that the virus is flesh-eating and kills its host. Patty and Vicky get into a fight, which is broken up by Derber after Patty removed Vicky's wig hair piece. Pete senses that Donwynn smells dead, and goes crazy. This gives Patty a chance to steal one of Derber's handguns, and escape to see Emma. Patty shoots and kills one of the security guards in order to open Emma's room. Marshall reanimates as a zombie and kills Dr. Heller, who has stopped in to study the advancement of the infection. Donwynn has jumped out of a window to try to find out why the hospital is quarantined, and observes the killing of Heller. While trying to find Emma, Patty shoots Isaac, but he revives and is unharmed. Marshall breaks free from his cell and kills a security guard.

Donwynn's friend arrives at the hospital just as Donwynn returns to the hospital, and informs the patients of what the virus truly is, and how it works. He also reveals that each of them are dead “by human standards.” He also reveals that those infected with the virus are highly contagious, and informs the patients of how the virus was first released. The zombified Marshall is shot at by the hospital's police force to no avail, and he kills several of them. Jackie attacks Donwynn's friend and slams his head into the door, opening a wound. Boris, no longer able to contain his blood lust, mutates into a zombie, and bites him, causing Jackie and Sam to attack him as well. The three devour him while Isaac, Donwynn and Emma run to the doctor's office, outside of the dorm. Jackie, Sam and Boris have completely turned to zombies and they taunt the surviving patients from inside the dorm.

Early the next morning, Dr. Heller has reanimated as a zombie. He enters the room where Vicky is hiding, but he is distracted by the infected Charlie who he chases away. The patients in the dining room all reanimate as zombies and begin to devour the police officers. The survivors escape into the kitchen of the hospital, but are forced to retreat into the back hallway. Patty finds Vicky in the medical room, and kills her while searching for Emma. The majority of the zombies escape from the hospital and head out into the city. The survivors manage to reach the medical room, where Emma goes into labor and the last police officer is killed. The zombies begin to kill people in the city, Charlie among the victims. Boris, Jackie and Sam break into the room, attacking Isaac, Emma and Donwynn, trying to convince them that they do not want to hurt any of them, they just want them to turn and be a family. Boris kills Ava, and Isaac commits suicide with the last round of a pistol. The movie ends with the zombies attacking a camera crew recording the carnage.

== Cast ==
- Justin Ipock as Isaac
- Laurie Maria Baranyay as Emma
- John F. Henry III as Jackie
- Julian Thomas as Sam Hovawitz
- Stephan Wolfert as Dr. Donwynn
- Steve Colosi as Boris
- Samantha Clarke as Ava Flories
- April Wade as Patty
- Joe C. Marino as Marshall
- Jackeline Olivier as Vicky
- Andreas van Ray as Dr. Heller
- Kevin Wetmore, Jr. as Jerry
- Simon Burzynski as Rubinsky
- Mike Dalager as Derber
- Christopher Estes as Charlie
- Rebuka Hoye as Linda
- Nazerine Capellini as Zombie
- Devaughn Graham as Zombie
- Brooke Hogan as Nurse
- Timothy Busfield as Mel

== Production ==
Day of the Dead 2: Contagium completed shooting in Los Angeles in April 2004. The co-directors said that production had been kept quiet in order to avoid media attention while filming due to Brooke Hogan's involvement.

== Release ==
A ten-minute promotional reel screened at the 2004 Fantasia International Film Festival, where it was not well received. It played at the 2005 London FrightFest Film Festival, after which Starz and Anchor Bay Entertainment released a special edition DVD on October 18, 2005.

== Reception ==
Writing in The Zombie Movie Encyclopedia, Volume 2, academic Peter Dendle called it a "boring, transparent feature" that was "forgotten almost as soon as it was released". Steve Barton of Dread Central rated it 0/5 stars and wrote, "This is a sequel in name only, created solely to generate revenue from ill informed fans." Joseph Savitski of Beyond Hollywood wrote that the film "is not only an exercise in incompetence, but also a blatant attempt at false advertising." Dennis Prince of DVD Verdict wrote, "There is no warning too strong that would urge you to avoid this DVD at all costs."
