= Leon Herbert =

British actor

- Born: 18 June 1955 (age 71); Georgetown, Guyana
- Occupation: Actor

Leon Herbert is a British actor. Herbert is known for appearances in films including Salome's Last Dance (1988), Scandal (1989), Batman (1989), Alien 3 (1992), Double X: The Name of the Game (1992), Point of No Return (1993), The Girl with the Hungry Eyes (1995), Fierce Creatures (1997), Lucinda's Spell (1998), South West 9 (2001), 9 Dead Gay Guys (2002) and Dark Floors (2008).

Herbert made his directorial debut with the 2003 film Emotional Backgammon. He also appeared on the television series Come Dine with Me, as well as an episode of the BBC soap opera Doctors as Lenny Rutter. He also played Errol Cooper in Ghosts, the father of Mike Cooper in the 2020 Christmas special, who constantly wants to help his son, and the doctor in the Inside No. 9 eighth series episode "Paraskevidekatriaphobia".
