= James Ricardo =

American film director

- Born: United States
- Occupations: Film director, screenwriter, producer

James Ricardo is an American film director, screenwriter and producer known for films including Hey DJ (2003), Opie Gets Laid (2009), Guillotine Guys (2010) and New Guy in Town (2012).

== Filmography ==
Year	Film	Director	Writer	Producer	Notes
2003	Hey DJ		check	check	
2009	Opie Gets Laid	check	check	check	
2010	Guillotine Guys	check	check	check	
2012	New Guy in Town	check	check	check	
