= Hey DJ (film) =

2003 film by Migel Delgado and Jon Jacobs

- Directed by: Miguel Delgado; Jon Jacobs; Agostino Carollo
- Written by: James Ricardo; Jon Jacobs; Agostino Carollo
- Produced by: Agostino Carollo; Joe Chavez; Jon Jacobs; James Ricardo
- Starring: Jon Jacobs; Charlotte Lewis; Tina Wiseman; Ivelin Giro; Terry Camilleri
- Cinematography: Edgar Cabral
- Edited by: Miguel Delgado; Agostino Carollo
- Music by: Agostino Carollo
- Release date: 2003
- Running time: 81 minutes
- Country: United States
- Language: English

Hey DJ, also released as DJ Hound Dog, is a 2003 American film directed by Miguel Delgado and Jon Jacobs, produced by Agostino Carollo and Joe Chavez and starring Jon Jacobs, Charlotte Lewis, Tina Wiseman, Ivelin Giro and Terry Camilleri. It features the appearances of superstar DJs Carl Cox, Tiësto, Bob Sinclar, Ferry Corsten, Marco V, Pete Tong and many others. The original movie soundtrack is by Agostino Carollo.

== Plot ==
Hey DJ chronicles the journeys of DJ Hound Dog. From Miami to Ibiza he struggles to break into the club scene. With the support and advice of some of the best DJs in the world he tries to find the night (and the love) of his life. The movie, filmed in and around such clubs as Space Miami and Pacha Ibiza features the appearances of Carl Cox, Tiësto, Judge Jules, Eddie Halliwell, Bob Sinclar, Pete Tong, Spankox, Anne Savage, Marc Aurel, Kai Tracid, Lisa Lashes, Chris Cox, Robbie Rivera, Kevens, Ferry Corsten, Junior Jack, Marco V, and 1980s rock star Annabella Lwin from Bow Wow Wow.

== Critical reception ==
Alan Ng of Film Threat wrote in his review, "DJ Hound Dog tells a good story about an emerging DJ looking for his break and the women he leaves along the way. While I wanted to get right into the middle of the action, I felt like I was a wallflower at a nightclub watching the cool stuff happen from a distance."

Andrew Wright of The Stranger said, "The stunningly photographed, cheerfully moronic DJ Hound Dog, about a mutton-chopped, tequila-chugging platter spinner (co-director Jon Jacobs) whose rise to the top of the Miami music scene includes plenty of medium-core nookie with a slew of ridiculously attractive women. Think of it as a Clambake or Harum Scarum for the new raved-up millennium, and know that somewhere, Col. Tom Parker is drooling.

== Aftermath ==
Hey DJ lead actor Jon Jacob's former fiancée, actress Tina Lieu (credited in Hey DJ as Tina Wiseman) who played the role of Cat in Hey DJ, passed away in 2005, leaving behind a son she had with Jacobs. In 2011, Jacobs paid tribute to Lieu by basing a multiplayer video game avatar on her called, "Island Girl."
