= The Golden Child =

1986 dark fantasy action comedy film by Michael Ritchie

- Theatrical release poster by John Alvin
- Directed by: Michael Ritchie
- Written by: Dennis Feldman
- Produced by: Edward S. Feldman; Robert D. Wachs
- Starring: Eddie Murphy; Charlotte Lewis; Charles Dance
- Cinematography: Donald E. Thorin
- Edited by: Richard A. Harris
- Music by: Michel Colombier; John Barry
- Production company: Paramount Pictures
- Distributed by: Paramount Pictures
- Release date: December 12, 1986
- Running time: 94 minutes
- Country: United States
- Language: English
- Budget: $12-24.5 million
- Box office: $149.4 million

The Golden Child is a 1986 American dark fantasy action comedy film directed by Michael Ritchie. The film stars Eddie Murphy as Chandler Jarrell, a Los Angeles social worker who is informed that he is "The Chosen One", and is destined to save "The Golden Child", a kidnapped Tibetan boy with mystical powers who is said to be the savior of all humankind. Alongside Murphy, the film's cast includes Charlotte Lewis and Charles Dance.

The Golden Child was produced and distributed by Paramount Pictures and grossed a total of $79,817,937 at the United States domestic box office.

== Plot ==
In a remote temple in Tibet, a young boy – the Golden Child – demonstrates his mystical powers to the monks of the temple by reviving a dead eastern rosella, which becomes a constant companion and familiar. A mysterious man, Sardo Numspa, has his men break into the temple, slaughter the monks, and abduct the boy.

A young woman, Kee Nang, watches a Los Angeles TV show in which independent social worker and private detective Chandler Jarrell talks about a missing girl named Cheryll Mosley. Kee informs him of the kidnapping of the Golden Child and that he is the "chosen one" who will save the Child. Chandler does not take this seriously, even after a bird begins following him and he sees an astral projection of the Child. The next day, Cheryll is found dead near an abandoned house smeared with Tibetan graffiti and a pot full of blood-soaked oatmeal. Kee reveals to Chandler that this house was a holding place for the Child and introduces him to Doctor Hong, a mystic expert, and Kala (a creature half dragon, half woman).

Chandler and Kee track down a motorcycle gang, the Yellow Dragons, which Cheryll had joined, and Chinese restaurant owner Tommy Tong, a henchman of Numspa, to whom Cheryll had been "sold" for her blood, a way to make the Child vulnerable to earthly harm. However, Tong is killed by Numspa as a potential traitor. Still not taking the case too seriously, Chandler is drawn by Numspa into a controlled dream. Numspa presents his demands: the Ajanti Dagger (a mystic weapon capable of killing the Child) in exchange for the boy. Chandler agrees to help, and he and Kee spend the night together.

Chandler and Kee travel to Tibet, where Chandler is swindled by an amulet seller, later revealed as the High Priest of the temple where the dagger is kept hidden (and, subsequently, Kee's father). To obtain the knife, Chandler has to pass a test: an obstacle course in a bottomless cavern whilst carrying a glass of water without spilling a drop. With luck and wits, he recovers the blade and brings it into the United States.

That night, Numspa and his henchmen attack Chandler and Kee. The Ajanti Dagger is lost to the villains, and Kee takes a crossbow bolt meant for Chandler, dying in his arms while confessing her love for him. Doctor Hong and Kala offer him hope: as long as the sun shines upon Kee, the Child might be able to save her. With the help of the Child's familiar, Chandler locates Numspa's hideout, retrieves the dagger with the help of Til, one of Numspa's men converted to good by the Child, and frees the boy. When Chandler confronts Numspa, he reveals himself as a winged demon. Chandler and the Child escape, only to be trapped inside a warehouse. Chandler loses the dagger when the warehouse collapses.

Chandler and the Child head to Doctor Hong's shop, where Kee is being kept. Numspa attacks Chandler, but the amulet the Old Man sold Chandler protects him, then blasts the dagger from Numspa's hand. The Child uses his magic to place the dagger back into Chandler's hands, and Chandler stabs Numspa, destroying him. The Child then uses the last rays of sunlight and his powers to bring Kee back from the dead. The three later take a walk discussing the Child's return to Tibet.

== Cast ==
- Eddie Murphy as Chandler Jarrell
- Charles Dance as Sardo Numspa
- Charlotte Lewis as Kee Nang
- Victor Wong as Old Goupa
- J. L. Reate as The Golden Child
- Randall "Tex" Cobb as Til
- James Hong as Dr. Hong
- Shakti Chen as Kala
- Tau Logo as Yu
- Tiger Chung Lee as Khan
- Pons Maar as Fu
- Peter Kwong as Tommy Tong
- Wally Taylor as Detective Boggs
- Eric Douglas as Yellow Dragon
- Charles Levin as TV Host
- Marilyn Schreffler as the voice of Kala
- Frank Welker as the voice of the Thing

== Production ==
Dennis Feldman, a professional photographer whose only writing credit was Just One of the Guys, wrote a script called The Rose of Tibet, which he planned as "a Raymond Chandler movie with supernatural elements." It attracted Hollywood's attention and after a bidding war Paramount Pictures purchased the script for $330,000. Feldman had intended it to be a detective story rather than a comedy and thought of Mel Gibson for the lead role. John Carpenter was offered the chance to direct the film, but he preferred to instead work on Big Trouble in Little China (1986) starring Kurt Russell. Murphy met with George Miller to direct the film.

J. L. Reate, the actor who played the Golden Child, the male titular character, was actually a girl: Jasmine Lauren Reate, who was six years old when filming began. This was her only theatrical performance, but she wound up in the movie industry anyway: as of 2019, Reate was executive director of events at the Toronto International Film Festival.

For special effects, the team used CGI, as well as traditional stop motion and go motion.

== Music ==
=== Score ===
The Golden Child: Music from the Motion Picture

Film score by John Barry, Michel Colombier, and others
- Released: July 12, 2011
- Recorded: 1986
- Genres: Film score; synthpop; R&B; soft rock; classic rock
- Length: 2:45:38
- Labels: La-La Land Records; Capitol
- Producer: Lukas Kendall

Alan Silvestri (Back to the Future) was originally sought to provide the film's score, but turned the project down. Paramount then turned to John Barry, who had just come off his award-winning score for Out of Africa. Barry composed a score for the film. However, during post-production, Barry also left the project, when both differences with the producers and test screening feedback presented considerable challenges for the composer. The test audience reaction led the producers to replace Barry's score with a second score, by Michel Colombier that, in contrast to Barry's work, was mostly "synthpop" (although there were some brief orchestral passages throughout). Some of Barry's musical cues remain in the final cut of the film and one track, "Wisdom of the Ages", appeared on the first soundtrack release issued by Capitol Records.

In 2011, La-La Land Records released a limited-edition 3-CD soundtrack set containing the entirety of both Barry's mostly unused score (on disc one), and Colombier's final theatrical score (on disc two), in addition to an exclusive Barry-composed song, sung by emerging composer Randy Edelman. The songs that had been released on Capitol's first soundtrack in 1986 were also featured in the set. A stand-alone release of only Barry's original score was issued by La-La Land in 2026.

=== Soundtrack ===
The following pieces of music appear on the soundtrack or in the film alongside Colombier's score:

- Ann Wilson - "The Best Man in the World" (Music by John Barry; lyrics by Wilson, Nancy Wilson and Sue Ennis)
- Meli'sa Morgan - "Deeper Love" (Composed by Diane Warren)
- Ashford & Simpson - "Love Goes On (Love Theme from The Golden Child)" (Composed by Colombier, Nicholas Ashford and Valerie Simpson)
- Martha Davis - "Shame On You" (Composed by Danny Chang and Michael Price)
- Ratt - "Body Talk" (Composed by Stephen Pearcy, Warren DeMartini and Juan Croucier)
- Marlon Jackson - "(Let Your Love Find) The Chosen One" (Composed by Jackson and Kathy Wakefield)
- Robbie Buchanan - "The Chosen One" (Composed by Colombier)
- John Barry - "Wisdom of the Ages" (Composed and conducted by Barry)
- "Puttin' on the Ritz" (Composed by Irving Berlin)
- "Another Day's Life" (Composed by David Wheatley)

== Reception ==
=== Box office ===
Released in December 1986, The Golden Child was a box office success. It earned US$79,817,937 in the United States alone, making it the eighth biggest film of the year. "My pictures make their money back," Eddie Murphy remarked in 1989. "No matter how I feel, for instance, about The Golden Child – which was a piece of shit – the movie made more than $100 million. So who am I to say it sucks?" After The Golden Child, Murphy would participate in the writing of many of his films.

Despite its commercial success, the film did not meet Paramount's expectations when compared to Murphy's previous film, Beverly Hills Cop (1984), which grossed $234,760,478 at the US box office.

=== Critical response ===
On Rotten Tomatoes, the film has an approval rating of 21% based on 28 reviews, with an average rating of 4.4/10. On Metacritic, the film has a score of 37 out of 100, based on reviews from 12 critics, indicating "generally unfavorable reviews". Audiences surveyed by CinemaScore gave the film an average grade of "B" on an A+ to F scale.

Roger Ebert of Chicago Sun-Times gave the film three out of four stars, and stated: "The Golden Child may not be the Eddie Murphy movie we were waiting for, but it will do. It is funnier, more assured and more tailored to Murphy than Beverly Hills Cop and it shows a side of his comic persona that I don't think has been much appreciated: his essential underlying sweetness. Murphy's comedy is not based on hurt and aggression, but on affection and an understanding that comes from seeing right through the other characters."

In his TV Movies and Video Guide, Leonard Maltin cited the film as a BOMB (his lowest possible rating): "A top candidate for the worst megahit of all time...Charlotte Lewis gives a wooden performance even for an ex-model; entire reels go by with hardly a chuckle. A box-office smash - but have you ever met anyone who says they liked it?" Janet Maslin of The New York Times seemed to agree, describing the picture as a "comedy without laughs".

Writer Dennis Feldman was disappointed with the film and thought they should have taken the script more seriously "but instead, everybody wanted to make an Eddie Murphy comedy" and was critical of director Michael Ritchie "it's not what the director should have done—and he didn't even do it that well, either." Charles Dance (who played the villain Sardo Numspa) said: "I thought I'd quite like to do a film with Eddie Murphy because he makes me laugh. The character was villainous, but he was a comic villain as far as I was concerned, and I hadn't done a film like that before. I don't think as an actor you should back off from any experience, so I thought, 'OK, we'll try this.' And I did it, and I know that it's played over and over again and a lot of devotees of that kind of thing say it's their favorite film. It was fun. I enjoyed doing it."

The film was nominated for best fantasy film at the Saturn Awards.
