= Enemies of Laughter =

- Directed by: Joey Travolta
- Screenplay by: Glen Merzer
- Produced by: Joey Travolta; Richard Salvatore
- Starring: David Paymer; Judge Reinhold; Rosalind Chao; Marilu Henner; Bea Arthur; Peter Falk
- Cinematography: Kristian Bernier
- Edited by: Will Wuorinen
- Production company: Sferrazza Productions
- Distributed by: Outrider Pictures
- Release date: November 9, 2000 (Fort Lauderdale International Film Festival)
- Running time: 90 minutes
- Country: United States
- Language: English

Enemies of Laughter is a 2000 American romantic comedy film directed by Joey Travolta and starring David Paymer, Judge Reinhold, Rosalind Chao, Marilu Henner, Bea Arthur and Peter Falk. This was Arthur's final film.

== Plot ==
The story of a playwright and screenwriter named Paul whose story is told by enemies. Paul is shy about returning to the theater since his last play bombed and would rather devote time to romancing his girlfriend Carla.

== Cast ==
- David Paymer as Paul
- Judge Reinhold as Sam
- Rosalind Chao as Carla
- Bea Arthur as Paul's Mother
- Peter Falk as Paul's Father
- Vanessa Angel as Jennifer
- Christina Fulton as Regina
- Kathy Griffin as Cindy
- Marilu Henner as Dani
- Paul Sampson as The Waiter
- Daphne Zuniga as Judy
- Glen Merzer as Josh

== Reception ==
The film has a 57% rating on Rotten Tomatoes. On Metacritic, the film has a score of 47 out of 100, based on four critics, indicating "mixed or average" reviews.
