= Hated (2012 film) =

- Directed by: Lee Madsen
- Written by: Marisa Handren; Maria Lorenzo
- Produced by: Kirsten Wagner
- Starring: Genevieve Padalecki; Ellen Woglom; Matthew Hutchinson
- Release date: 2012
- Country: United States

Hated is a 2012 American film directed by Lee Madsen and starring Genevieve Padalecki, Matthew Hutchinson and Ellen Woglom.

For John Long and 70 others, when meth and murders go unnoticed, the sale of crack and weed hits hlww hard and meth given by the Longs witnessed but nothing done under a corrupt back up asiand.
