= Charlotte Lewis =

English actress

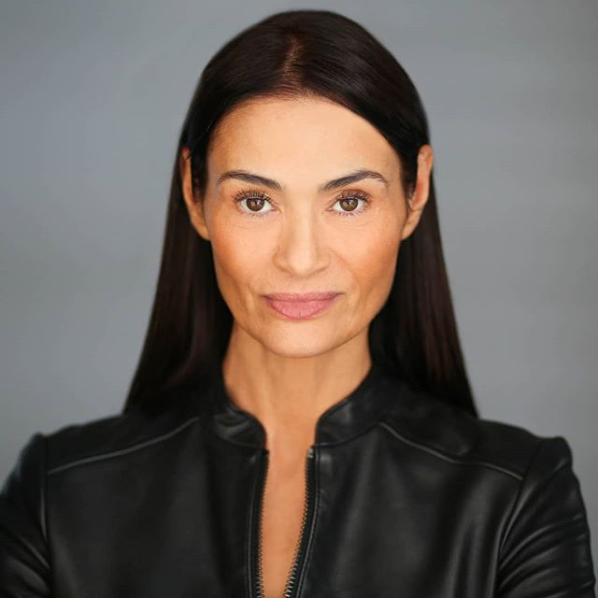
- Lewis in 2018
- Born: 7 August 1967 (age 58); Kensington, London, England, United Kingdom
- Occupation: Actress
- Years active: 1984–2003, 2019-present

Charlotte Lewis (born 7 August 1967) is an English actress. She is best known as Kee Nang in the 1986 film The Golden Child. She retired from acting after an appearance in the 2003 film Hey DJ, briefly returning to appear in the 2019 art film, Lost Angelas, which received a limited theatrical release.

== Early life ==
Lewis attended Bishop Douglass School in Finchley. Her mother is Irish-English, and her father is half-Chilean and half-Iraqi.

== Career ==
Lewis made her film debut as a teenager in the 1986 Roman Polanski film Pirates. She followed it that same year with the co-lead in The Golden Child alongside Eddie Murphy. Later appearances include the film Tripwire (1990) and Storyville (1992), opposite James Spader. She had a co-starring role in Men of War (1994), alongside Dolph Lundgren, and in the 1995 film Decoy. Lewis appeared in the 2003 film Hey DJ.

Lewis also appeared in a cover-featured pictorial in the July 1993 issue of Playboy magazine.

In 1995, Lewis appeared in the direct-to-video erotic horror film Embrace of the Vampire (starring Alyssa Milano) and guest-starred in an episode of the sitcom Seinfeld as George Costanza's seemingly-bulimic girlfriend.

Lewis acted in the 2019 film Lost Angelas playing Angie Malone, one of the title roles.

== Accusation against Roman Polanski ==
On 14 May 2010, Lewis and her Los Angeles-based attorney Gloria Allred accused Roman Polanski of having sexually assaulted Lewis when she was 16 years old, while the two were working on Pirates. Prosecutors in Los Angeles confirmed that they interviewed Lewis in connection with the allegations. According to Lewis, the incident occurred at Polanski's Paris apartment in 1983.

On 17 May 2010, an article called into question Lewis' testimony by referencing an account of events she gave in an interview with the UK's News of the World, in which she had spoken of a relationship with Polanski, along with several other actors. Later, in December 2019, French magazine L’Obs came back to the News of the World story, relating a "violent campaign to discredit her" in the media. Charlotte Lewis said: "I was completely alone in 2010. No one believed me. They said I was a prostitute, a liar. I'm a little anxious to talk. The media got me so depressed."

Lewis filed a claim for defamation, and Polanski was charged under French law. She told the court, which specialised in media cases, and was concerned with the defamation and not the rape allegation, that she had become the victim of a "smear campaign" that "nearly destroyed" her life. Polanski did not attend any of the hearings, including the verdict given in his favour in May 2024, when he was acquitted of the defamation.

== Filmography ==
=== Film ===
Year	Title	Role	Notes
1986	Pirates	María-Dolores de la Jenya de la Calde	
1986	The Golden Child	Kee Nang	
1988	Dial: Help	Jenny Cooper	
1989	Tripwire	Trudy	
1989	The Legend of the Emerald Princess	Emerald Princess	Short film
1990	Stranger in the House	Unknown	
1991	Healing Hurts	Unknown	
1992	Storyville	Lee Tran	
1993	Excessive Force	Anna Gilmour	
1994	Lipstick Camera	Roberta Dailey	
1994	Men of War	Loki	
1995	Embrace of the Vampire	Sarah	
1995	Decoy	Katya	
1996	The Glass Cage	Jacqueline	
1996	Navajo Blues	Elizabeth Wyako	
1997	Mutual Needs	Louise Collier	
1999	Every Dog Has Its Day	Jill	
2003	Henry X	Mrs. Morgan	
2003	Hey DJ	Tai	
2019	Lost Angelas	Angie Malone	

=== Television ===
Year	Title	Role	Notes
1988	Crime Story	Mai Lan	"Femme Fatale"
1990–1991	Broken Bridges	Priscilla Mather	Recurring role
1991	Bare Essentials	Tarita	TV film
1992	Sketch Artist	Leese	TV film
1993	Red Shoe Diaries	Claire	"Midnight Bells"
1995	Seinfeld	Nina	"The Switch"
1996	Viper	Evangeline Raines	"White Fire"
1996	Renegade	Kate	"The Pipeline"
1999	Highlander: The Raven	Jade	"The Frame"
