= April Wade =

American actress

- Born: United States
- Occupations: Actress, film producer, screenwriter
- Known for: Opie Gets Laid; Day of the Dead 2: Contagium

April Wade is an American actress, film producer and screenwriter.

Wade is best known for films and television series such as April Showers, Happy Endings, Creepshow III, Day of the Dead 2: Contagium, Opie Gets Laid and Junction.
