= Tripwire (film) =

- Directed by: James Lemmo
- Produced by: Paul Hertzberg; Lisa M. Hansen; Jefferson Richard
- Starring: Terence Knox; David Warner; Isabella Hoffmann; Charlotte Lewis; Yaphet Kotto; Tommy Chong; Meg Foster
- Cinematography: Igor Sunar
- Music by: Richard Stone
- Production company: CineTel Films
- Distributed by: New Line Cinema
- Release date: November 30, 1989 (UK)
- Running time: 91 min.
- Country: United States
- Language: English

Tripwire is a 1989 American film directed by James Lemmo.

It is an action/adventure film about a terrorist and government secret agent personal vendetta that began when a train hijacking goes badly awry and the terrorist's son is accidentally killed. The original music score was composed by Richard Stone. Although Tripwire enjoyed a theatrical release in Europe in 1989, the film was released directly to video and laserdisc on March 21, 1990 in the U.S. by RCA/Columbia and in Canada by Cineplex Odeon. The movie has not been released on DVD and as of December 26, 2009, Sony has not announced any plans to release the movie on DVD.

== Plot ==
A band of ruthless international terrorists led by Josef Szabo (David Warner) hijack a speeding railroad train loaded with a full arsenal of powerful military weaponry capable of threatening world peace. The only hero who can stop the terrorists' scheme for world domination is Jack DeForest (Terence Knox). During the battle between good and evil the hero DeForest accidentally kills the son of the Szabo. Seeking revenge Szabo locates DeForest’s family, murders his wife and kidnaps their teenage son thereby turning their fight it into a personal vendetta.

So, DeForest must fight not only to save the world, but for his only remaining family.

== Cast ==
- Terence Knox as Jack DeForest
- David Warner as Josef Szabo
- Meg Foster as Julia
- Yaphet Kotto as Lee Pitt
- Isabella Hofmann as Annie
- Charlotte Lewis as Trudy
- Sy Richardson as "Turbo"
- Andras Jones as Rick DeForest
- Marco Rodriguez as "El Tigre"
- Viggo Mortensen as Hans
- Tommy Chong as Merle Shine
- Richard Stay as Jeff Szabo
- Lou Bonacki as Reese
- Dean Tokuno as Mizoguchi
- Jon Richard Platten as Major Riley

== Production ==
Parts of the film were shot in Park City, Utah.
