= The Girl with the Hungry Eyes (1995 film) =

- Film poster
- Directed by: Jon Jacobs
- Written by: Fritz Leiber (story); Jon Jacobs; Christina Fulton
- Produced by: Michael Kastenbaum; Seth Kastenbaum; Jon Jacobs
- Starring: Christina Fulton; Leon Herbert; Jon Jacobs; Isaac Turner
- Cinematography: Gary Tieche
- Distributed by: Columbia Pictures
- Release date: 1995
- Country: United States
- Language: English

The Girl with the Hungry Eyes is a 1995 American horror film starring Christina Fulton, Leon Herbert, Jon Jacobs and Isaac Turner. Loosely based on Fritz Leiber's 1949 story of the same name, about a pinup girl as a psychic vampire, it was written and directed by Jacobs.

== Plot ==
A fashion model in the 1930s, who owns an Art Deco Miami hotel, kills herself when her fiancé is unfaithful to her. Sixty years later she returns to life as a vampire.
