= Agostino Carollo =

Italian DJ and producer

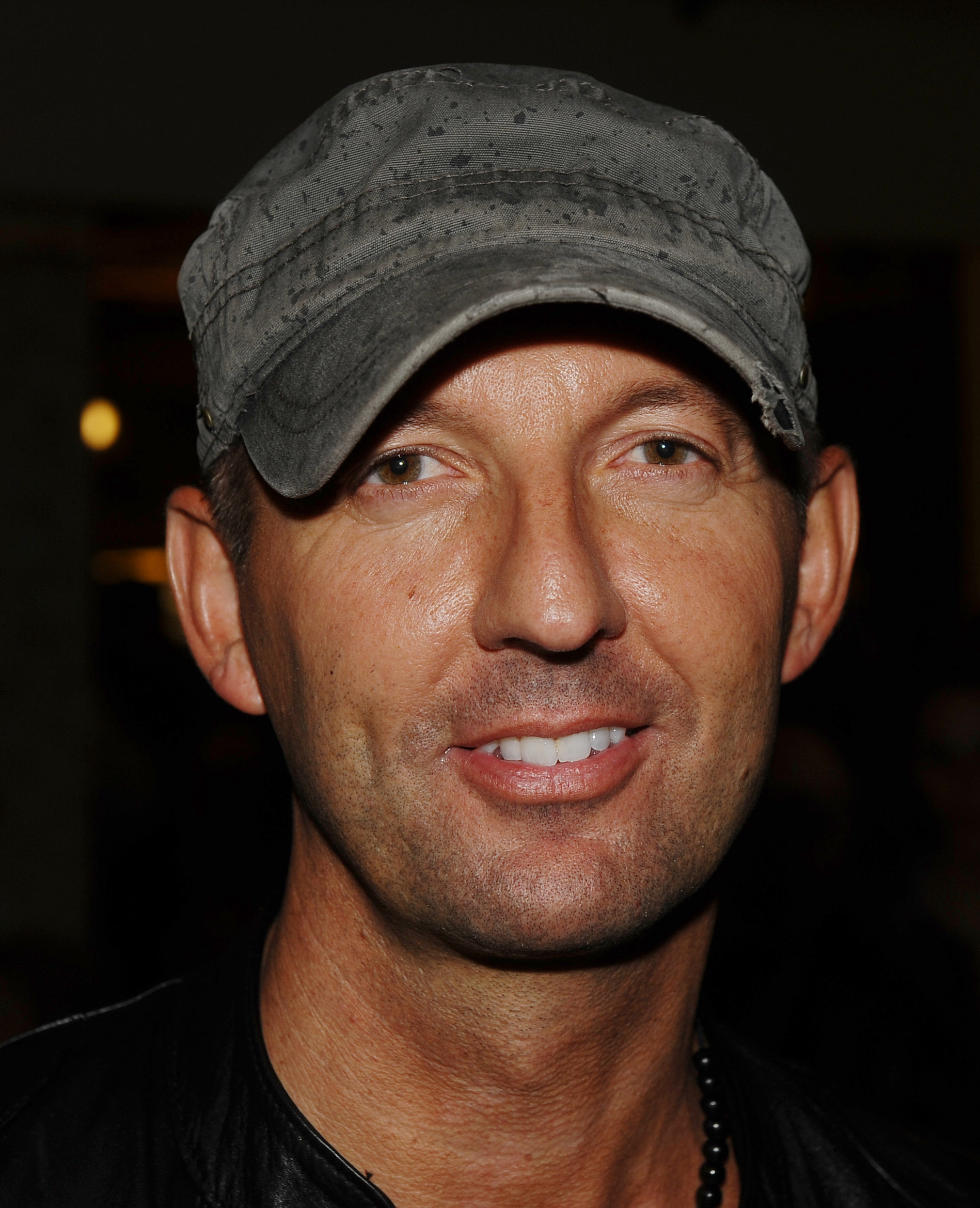
- Carollo in 2013

Background information
- Born: June 8, 1966 (age 60); Rovereto, Trentino, Italy
- Genres: Pop, dance
- Occupations: Disc jockey, musician, singer, producer
- Website: agocarollo.com

Agostino Carollo, also known as Spankox, is an Italian musician, disc jockey, singer and producer who is currently signed with EMI. Originally a classical violinist, he specializes in pop and dance music, including remixes of songs such as KC and the Sunshine Band's That's the Way. He has also released such records as X-Treme, Eyes Cream, Ago, K-Roll, Tino Augusto DJ, DJ B3LFAST, DJ Rikituki and Spankox. Several of his songs have appeared in the Dancemania compilation series and Dance Dance Revolution video game series under the name X-Treme.

== Discography ==
=== Charted singles ===
List of charted singles, with selected chart positions
Title	Year	Peak chart positions			
Title	Year	AUS	FIN	NLD	UK
"To the Club"	2004	85	13	45	69
"Baby Let's Play House (Spankox Re:Version)" (Elvis Presley)	2008	—	—	—	84
"Pocketful of Rainbows (Spankox Remix)" (Elvis Presley)	2011	—	—	32	—

=== Remixes ===
- Stars (Remixes), 1999
- Dancemania 21, 2001

=== Other songs ===
- 1992
- A Minute
- Another One Bites the Dust
- Come Vasco Rossi
- Dancing
- Deeboudaebeedoee
- Everything
- Fly Away (Bye Bye)
- Fly High
- Happy Children
- Hip Whoop
- Hypnotika
- I'm Your Boogie Man
- It's Smoke on the Water
- Jumpin
- Let's All Get Up!
- Livin in a Disco
- Long Train Running
- Love Is Your Name
- Love Song
- Love You Too
- Magdalena
- Mas Que Nada
- My Fire
- Michael Jackson Is Not Dead
- No Corrida
- No Satisfaction
- On A Day
- Open Up Your Mind
- Perchon vi tappate la bocca
- Put on Your Red Shoes
- Qui Ritornera
- September
- Sleep All Day All Night
- So True
- Soul Bossa Nova
- Take Me Higher
- Take the Record, Daddy!
- Tell Me
- Tell Me Where You Are
- That's The Way
- The Love Album
- This Is the Voice!
- Up, Side, Jump!
- Viva La Discoteca
- Welcome You
- What Do You Feel Now?
- What Time Is It?
- What You Dream
- Wonderland Bee
- Work Your Body
- X-Treme
- Yo Quiero Un Chico
- Your Love Is Coming Down Over Me
- Your Night
